= 1959 World Series =

1959 Major League Baseball championship series

Team (Wins)	Managers	Season
Los Angeles Dodgers (4)	Walter Alston	88–68, .564, GA: 2
Chicago White Sox (2)	Al López	94–60, .610, GA: 5
- Dates: October 1–8
- Venue(s): Comiskey Park (Chicago); Los Angeles Memorial Coliseum (Los Angeles)
- MVP: Larry Sherry (Los Angeles)
- Umpires: Bill Summers (AL), Frank Dascoli (NL), Eddie Hurley (AL), Frank Secory (NL), Johnny Rice (AL: outfield only), Hal Dixon (NL: outfield only)
- Hall of Famers: Dodgers: Walt Alston (manager); Don Drysdale; Gil Hodges; Sandy Koufax; Duke Snider; White Sox: Al López (manager); Luis Aparicio; Nellie Fox; Early Wynn

Broadcast
- Television: NBC
- TV announcers: Jack Brickhouse and Vin Scully
- Radio: NBC
- Radio announcers: Mel Allen and By Saam

The 1959 World Series was the championship series of Major League Baseball's (MLB) 1959 season. The 56th edition of the World Series, it was a best-of-seven playoff that matched the National League (NL) champion Los Angeles Dodgers against the American League (AL) champion Chicago White Sox. The Dodgers won in six games to earn the second championship in their history and their first since moving to Los Angeles from Brooklyn the season before. Each of the three games played at the Los Angeles Memorial Coliseum drew record crowds, Game 5's attendance of 92,706 continues to be a World Series record, and one that cannot feasibly be broken in any current baseball-specific park.

This was the first World Series played on the West Coast, outside Major League Baseball's traditional territory that stretched from Boston to Washington, D.C., in the East and to St. Louis in the Midwest from 1876 through 1955, which ended when the Philadelphia Athletics moved to Kansas City. A West Coast World Series had become a possibility only a year before, when the Dodgers and the Giants relocated to Los Angeles and San Francisco (from Brooklyn and Manhattan, respectively) prior to the 1958 season.

For the White Sox, who had last won a championship in 1917, it was their first World Series appearance since 1919, when the team's unexpected loss to the Cincinnati Reds coincided with the Black Sox Scandal. This was the only World Series to be played in the City of Chicago between the Cubs' loss in 1945 and the White Sox win in 2005.

The Dodgers won their first National League pennant since moving from Brooklyn after the 1957 season by defeating the Milwaukee Braves (another franchise that had relocated from their original city, Boston, in 1953) 2–0 in a best-of-three tie breaker series. The Dodgers' first world championship in Los Angeles, the win was their second World Series victory in franchise history and their second in five seasons, after beating the New York Yankees in 1955. This was also the Dodgers' only win as a tenant of the Coliseum; their next World Series victories would come when playing in Dodger Stadium.

1955 was their first win in the Fall Classic after seven consecutive losses between 1916 and 1953. While the Brooklyn Dodgers had gone 1–8 in the World Series, the Los Angeles Dodgers have gone 8-6 through their 14 appearances between 1959 and 2025.

It was the first championship for a West Coast team, and it was the first World Series in which no pitcher for either side pitched a complete game. As Vin Scully remarked in his narration for the official World Series film, "What a change of scenery!" This was the only Fall Classic played during the period from 1949 through 1964 in which no games were played in New York City.

== Route to the World Series ==
=== Dodgers ===
After finishing seventh in 1958, the Dodgers rebounded in 1959. The National League pennant race was a season-long three-way battle between the Dodgers, the two-time defending N.L. champion Milwaukee Braves and the San Francisco Giants. The Dodgers never led by more than two games (and that was at the end of a tie-breaker) and never trailed by more than five. On September 20, the Dodgers completed a three-game sweep in San Francisco so that, with five games to play, they had a 1/2 game lead on the Braves and a one-game lead over the Giants. Going into the final day, the Dodgers and Braves were tied for first and the Giants were 1 1/2 games back; the Giants needed to sweep a doubleheader from the Cardinals and have the Dodgers and Braves both lose to force a three-way tie. But the Dodgers won in Chicago 7–1 and the Braves won at home against the Phillies 5–2; this made the fact that the Giants lost both games of their doubleheader irrelevant.

In Game 1 of the best-of-three playoff in Milwaukee, the Dodgers took a 3–2 lead in the top of the sixth inning. Dodger reliever Larry Sherry then retired 12 of the last 13 Braves hitters to secure the win.

Games 2 and 3 (if necessary) were scheduled for Los Angeles. In Game 2, the Dodgers trailed 5–2 in the ninth inning, but rallied to tie the game with five singles and a sacrifice fly. In the top of the 11th, the Braves loaded the bases with two out, but Stan Williams got pinch hitter Joe Adcock to ground out to end the threat. In the bottom of the 12th, Gil Hodges drew a walk with two out and nobody on. Joe Pignatano singled Hodges to second. Carl Furillo hit a ground ball to shortstop Félix Mantilla; Mantilla's throw to first base was in the dirt and skipped past Frank Torre, allowing Hodges to score all the way from second with the pennant-clinching run.

=== White Sox ===
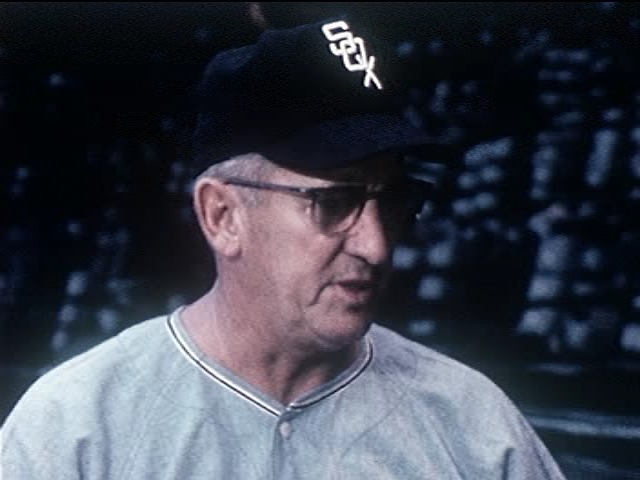
Manager Al Lopez

Managed by Al López, the White Sox were built on pitching, speed and defense. Nicknamed the "Go-go Sox", they were last in the A.L. in home runs but led the league in stolen bases, fielding percentage, and lowest team ERA. They battled the Cleveland Indians for the American League pennant, and after a close race, the White Sox built a 6 1/2 game lead in early September. The Indians could get no closer than 3 1/2 games, and when the White Sox beat Cleveland 4–2 on September 22, they clinched the pennant with three games to play. The White Sox were only the second team besides the Yankees to win the A.L. pennant between 1949 and 1964 inclusive; the other was the 1954 Indians, also managed by Al López.

== Summary ==
NL Los Angeles Dodgers (4) vs. AL Chicago White Sox (2)

Game	Date	Score	Location	Time	Attendance
1	October 1	Los Angeles Dodgers – 0, Chicago White Sox – 11	Comiskey Park	2:35	48,013
2	October 2	Los Angeles Dodgers – 4, Chicago White Sox – 3	Comiskey Park	2:21	47,368
3	October 4	Chicago White Sox – 1, Los Angeles Dodgers – 3	Los Angeles Memorial Coliseum	2:33	92,394
4	October 5	Chicago White Sox – 4, Los Angeles Dodgers – 5	Los Angeles Memorial Coliseum	2:30	92,650
5	October 6	Chicago White Sox – 1, Los Angeles Dodgers – 0	Los Angeles Memorial Coliseum	2:28	92,706
6	October 8	Los Angeles Dodgers – 9, Chicago White Sox – 3	Comiskey Park	2:33	47,653

== Matchups ==
=== Game 1 ===
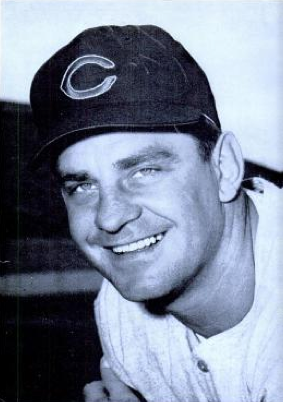
Ted Kluszewski

Thursday, October 1, 1959 1:00 pm (CT) at Comiskey Park in Chicago, Illinois
Team	1	2	3	4	5	6	7	8	9	R	H	E
Los Angeles	0	0	0	0	0	0	0	0	0	0	8	3
Chicago	2	0	7	2	0	0	0	0	X	11	11	0
WP: Early Wynn (1–0) LP: Roger Craig (0–1) Sv: Gerry Staley (1); Home runs: LAD: None; CWS: Ted Kluszewski 2 (2)

Historic Comiskey Park hosted a crowd of 48,103 that included Hollywood's Joan Crawford and Orson Welles and former Illinois governor Adlai Stevenson, the 1952 and 1956 Democratic presidential candidate for president.

Game 1 was the first championship game in 40 years for the White Sox as well as the first postseason game in Chicago in 14 years, when the Chicago Cubs lost to the Detroit Tigers in Game 7 of 1945 World Series.

On the pitching mound, Early Wynn of the White Sox faced Roger Craig of the Dodgers. After scoring twice in the first inning on back-to-back RBI singles by Ted Kluszewski and Sherm Lollar after a walk and single, the Sox pounded across seven runs in the third. Nellie Fox doubled with one out and scored on Jim Landis's single before Kluszewski's two-run home run knocked Craig out of the game. Lollar reached second on an error off of Chuck Churn and scored on Billy Goodman's single. Then RBI doubles by Al Smith and Early Wynn and fielder's choice by Jim Rivera aided by two more errors made it 9–0 White Sox. Ted Kluszewski's second home run of the game off of Churn next inning capped the game's scoring as the Sox routed the Dodgers 11–0.

=== Game 2 ===
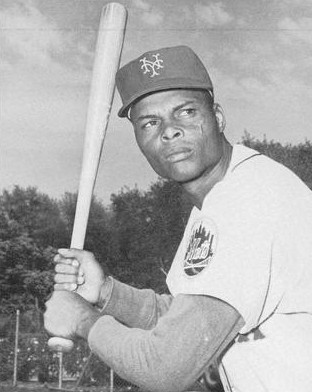
Charlie Neal

Friday, October 2, 1959 1:00 pm (CT) at Comiskey Park in Chicago, Illinois
Team	1	2	3	4	5	6	7	8	9	R	H	E
Los Angeles	0	0	0	0	1	0	3	0	0	4	9	1
Chicago	2	0	0	0	0	0	0	1	0	3	8	0
WP: Johnny Podres (1–0) LP: Bob Shaw (0–1) Sv: Larry Sherry (1); Home runs: LAD: Charlie Neal 2 (2), Chuck Essegian (1); CWS: None

Game 2 featured Bob Shaw of the White Sox face Johnny Podres of the Dodgers. Once again, the Sox jumped out to a quick 2–0 lead in the first inning on Ted Kluszewski's RBI groundout with runners on first and third followed by Sherm Lollar's RBI single. In the fifth, Charlie Neal homered for the first Dodger run of the series. Chuck Essegian's two-out home run tied the game tied 2–2 in the seventh, then after a walk, Neal hit his second home run of the day to put the Dodgers ahead for the first time, 4–2. During a Sox uprising in the eighth against Larry Sherry, Al Smith doubled to left with two men on, cutting the lead to 4–3. However, Sherm Lollar was thrown out by a mile at the plate trying to score due to Wally Moon faking a catch that fooled Lollar. Sherry pitched a perfect ninth to notch a save and give the Dodgers the win.

=== Game 3 ===
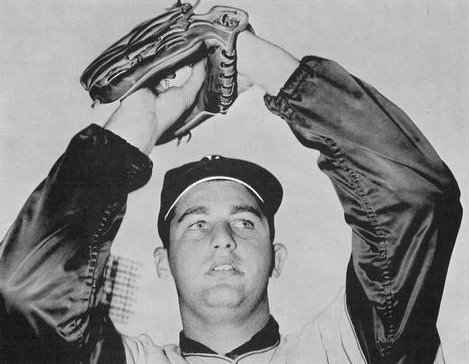
Larry Sherry

Sunday, October 4, 1959 2:00 pm (PT) at Los Angeles Memorial Coliseum in Los Angeles, California
Team	1	2	3	4	5	6	7	8	9	R	H	E
Chicago	0	0	0	0	0	0	0	1	0	1	12	0
Los Angeles	0	0	0	0	0	0	2	1	X	3	5	0
WP: Don Drysdale (1–0) LP: Dick Donovan (0–1) Sv: Larry Sherry (2)

In contrast to the crowd of 36,528 for the tie-breaker playoff game at the Los Angeles Coliseum, 92,394 showed up for the first World Series game ever played on the West Coast. Dick Donovan faced off against the host team's Don Drysdale in Game 3. Six scoreless innings were thrown by the two, with Donovan giving up only one hit. However, Donovan would load the bases in the seventh inning on two walks and a single before being replaced by Gerry Staley. A single by Carl Furillo scored two runs. Drysdale allowed two singles and Larry Sherry hit a batter to load the bases with no outs in the eighth, but gave up just a run on Al Smith's double play. The Dodgers got that run back in the bottom half when Maury Wills hit a leadoff single off of Gerry Staley and scored on Charlie Neal's double. Sherry shut down the Sox in the ninth as the Dodgers won, 3–1 despite being outhit 12–5. The White Sox stranded 11 runners and were 0–for–7 with them in scoring position.

=== Game 4 ===
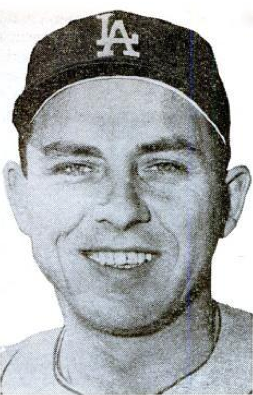
Gil Hodges

Monday, October 5, 1959 2:00 pm (PT) at Los Angeles Memorial Coliseum in Los Angeles, California
Team	1	2	3	4	5	6	7	8	9	R	H	E
Chicago	0	0	0	0	0	0	4	0	0	4	10	3
Los Angeles	0	0	4	0	0	0	0	1	X	5	9	0
WP: Larry Sherry (1–0) LP: Gerry Staley (0–1); Home runs: CWS: Sherm Lollar (1); LAD: Gil Hodges (1)

Early Wynn and Roger Craig faced off against each other once again before a crowd of 92,650. Wynn was knocked out by a four-run Dodger third inning. Wally Moon singled with two outs and scored on Norm Larker's single. Larker, who moved to second on an error, scored on Gil Hodges's single. Hodges moved to third on a Don Demeter single and scored on a passed ball, then John Roseboro's RBI single capped the inning's scoring. The Sox tied the game in the seventh on Ted Kluszewski's RBI single with two on followed by Sherm Lollar socking a three-run home run, but Gil Hodges blasted one over the fence in the next inning off of Gerry Staley to give the Dodgers a 5–4 lead, then Larry Sherry pitched a scoreless ninth to put the Dodgers a win away from the World Series championship.

=== Game 5 ===
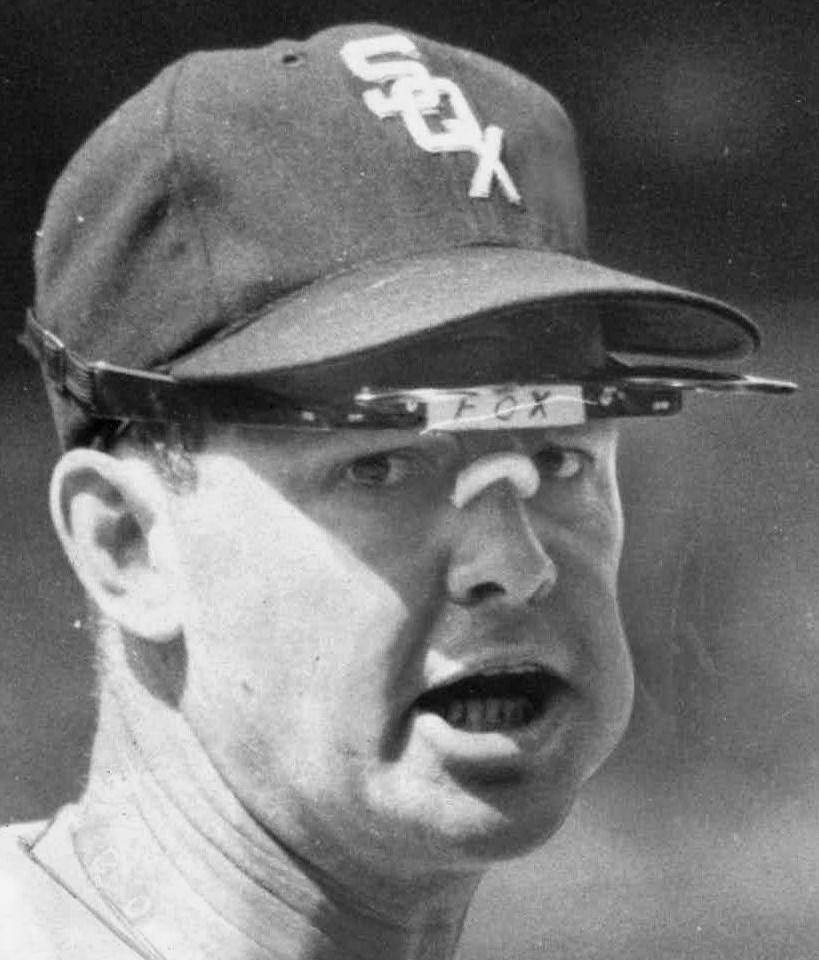
Nellie Fox

Tuesday, October 6, 1959 2:00 pm (PT) at Los Angeles Memorial Coliseum in Los Angeles, California
Team	1	2	3	4	5	6	7	8	9	R	H	E
Chicago	0	0	0	1	0	0	0	0	0	1	5	0
Los Angeles	0	0	0	0	0	0	0	0	0	0	9	0
WP: Bob Shaw (1–1) LP: Sandy Koufax (0–1) Sv: Dick Donovan (1)

A record-breaking crowd of 92,706 turned out, a majority hoping to celebrate a Los Angeles championship. For the first time in World Series history, however, three pitchers combined for a shutout, as Bob Shaw, Billy Pierce and Dick Donovan quieted the Dodgers and their fans 1–0 in Game 5, sending the series back to Chicago. The game's only run scored in the fourth off starter Sandy Koufax, coming when Nellie Fox scored as Lollar grounded into a double play. To date, this remains the largest crowd in World Series history.

=== Game 6 ===
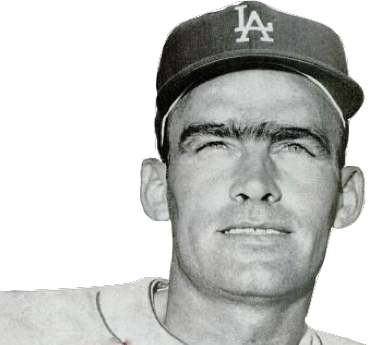
Wally Moon

Thursday, October 8, 1959 1:00 pm (CT) at Comiskey Park in Chicago, Illinois
Team	1	2	3	4	5	6	7	8	9	R	H	E
Los Angeles	0	0	2	6	0	0	0	0	1	9	13	0
Chicago	0	0	0	3	0	0	0	0	0	3	6	1
WP: Larry Sherry (2–0) LP: Early Wynn (1–1); Home runs: LAD: Duke Snider (1), Wally Moon (1), Chuck Essegian (2); CWS: Ted Kluszewski (3)

The victory in Game 5 gave the Sox hope, heading back home to a "real ballpark," as opposed to L.A.'s converted football stadium. But the change in scenery was no help. Early Wynn started with only two days rest, and after surrendering two runs in the third inning on Duke Snider's home run after a walk, the Dodgers broke open the game with six more in the fourth. Norm Larker hit a leadoff single, moved to second on a sacrifice bunt, and scored on Maury Wills's single. Wills scored on Johnny Podres's double to knock Wynn out of the game. Dick Donovan walked Jim Gilliam before allowing a two-run double to Charlie Neal and two-run home run to Wally Moon to make it 8–0 Dodgers. Starter Podres was also knocked out in the fourth by Chicago's last gasp, another towering three-run home run by the hottest Sox hitter, Ted Kluszewski, after a walk and hit-by-pitch. In the ninth inning, Chuck Essegian set a World Series record with his second pinch-hit home run of the Series off of Ray Moore, and the Dodgers captured their first championship as a Los Angeles team. Relief pitcher Larry Sherry was voted Most Valuable Player of the Series after finishing with a 2–0 record, two saves, five strikeouts, and a 0.71 ERA, allowing only one earned run off eight hits in 12 2/3 innings pitched.

== Composite line score ==
1959 World Series (4–2): Los Angeles Dodgers (N.L.) over Chicago White Sox (A.L.)

Team	1	2	3	4	5	6	7	8	9	R	H	E
Los Angeles Dodgers	0	0	6	6	1	0	5	2	1	21	53	4
Chicago White Sox	4	0	7	6	0	0	4	2	0	23	52	4
Total attendance: 420,784 Average attendance: 70,131; Winning player's share: $11,231 Losing player's share: $7,257

== Records and unique characteristics ==
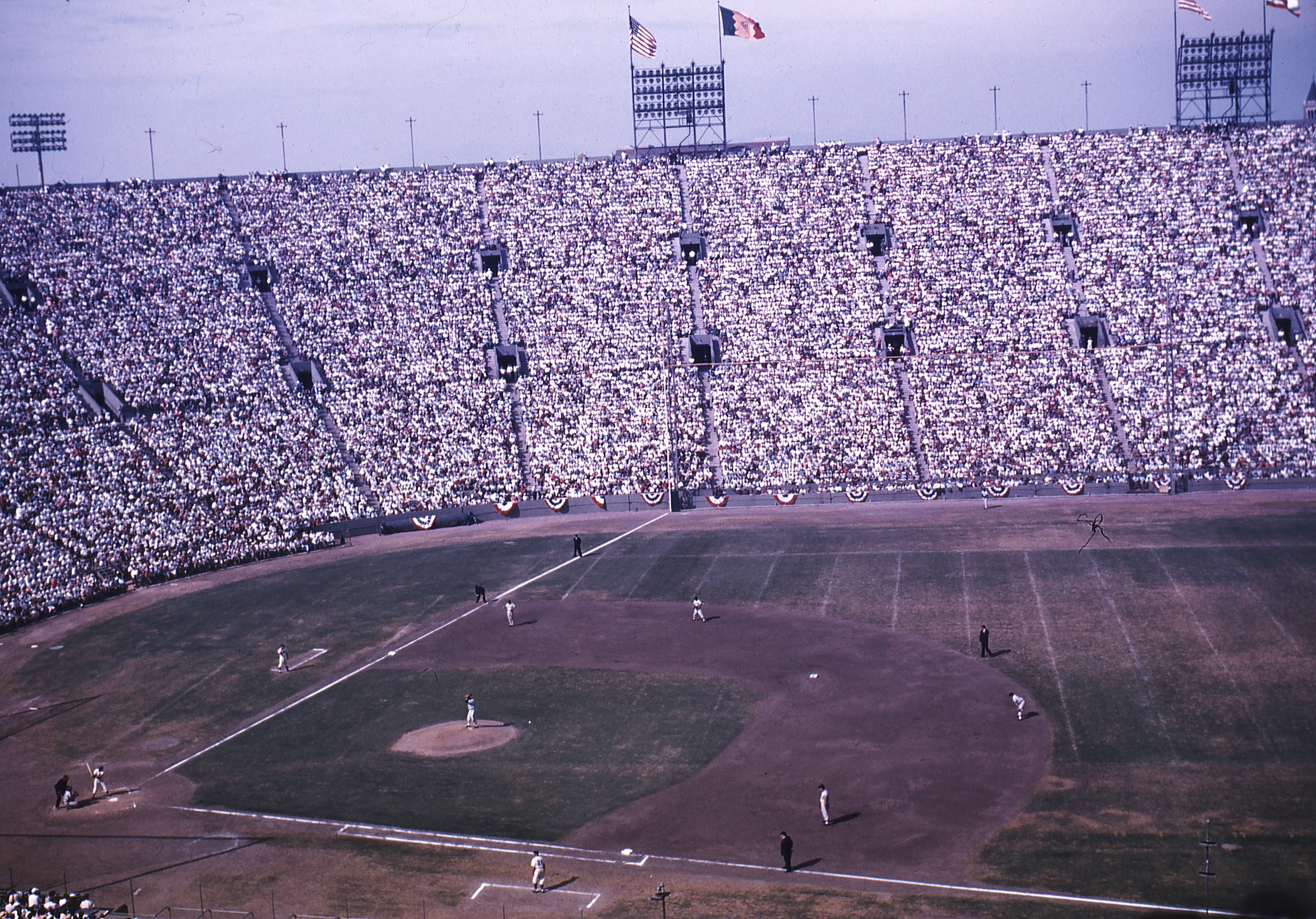
World Series action at the Los Angeles Memorial Coliseum

The Dodgers found an unlikely hero when Chuck Essegian, who hit only one home run in 1959 and had only six in his career to that point, set a World Series record with two pinch-hit home runs.

Due to the best-of-three N.L. playoff, Game 1 was deferred from Wednesday, September 30, to Thursday, October 1. The normal travel days were retained between Games 2 and 3, and Games 5 and 6, resulting in the rare event of a Series with no Saturday game scheduled.

Games 3, 4 and 5 were:

- The first World Series games ever played on the West Coast;
- The first and only played in the Los Angeles Memorial Coliseum;
- The only games in World Series history to exceed 90,000 in attendance: Game 5 drew 92,706 fans (a major league record unlikely to be broken under current arrangements, as no current MLB stadium has a capacity of even 60,000 – Dodger Stadium currently has the largest capacity in the MLB with a little over 54,000)

This was the first World Series to draw more than 400,000 fans.

Larry Sherry of the Dodgers was the fifth consecutive pitcher to win the World Series Most Valuable Player Award (in only the fifth year it was awarded), following Johnny Podres (Brooklyn, 1955), Don Larsen (New York, 1956), Lew Burdette (Milwaukee, 1957), and Bob Turley (New York, 1958). Sherry, who had been born with club feet, finished all four games the Dodgers won, winning two and saving two. His brother Norm was the Dodgers' backup catcher.

Although he was not voted MVP, Dodger second baseman Charlie Neal batted .370 for the Series, and his two-homer performance in Game 2 came after Chicago's pitching had held L.A. scoreless for 13 consecutive innings.

Ted Kluszewski played for the losing "Pale Hose" but still managed to drive in a World Series record-tying ten runs, joining Yogi Berra, who drove in ten in the 1956 World Series. "Big Klu" did so in just six games, and his 10 RBIs in the 1959 World Series remain a record for a 6-game World Series, as Berra's 10 RBIs in 1956 came in a 7-game World Series. (However, Bobby Richardson would break the record for RBIs in a World Series, regardless of length, the next year with 12 against the Pittsburgh Pirates in the 1960 World Series.)

The Dodgers became the second National League team to win a World Series after relocating (the 1957 Milwaukee Braves being the first).

The Dodgers became the first team to go from 7th place in one season to World Champion the next.

The 1959 World Series was the last one for Comiskey Park, and the only one for Los Angeles Memorial Coliseum. The White Sox would move into Rate Field, originally "New Comiskey", in 1991; the Dodgers moved into Dodger Stadium in 1962. This was the last World Series to host the final World Series games of both its host venues until 2003, as the original Yankee Stadium closed following the 2008 Major League Baseball season and the Florida Marlins moved out of Sun Life Stadium after the 2011 season.

== Aftermath ==
The victory over the White Sox marked the start of a new era of Dodger baseball, as the Dodgers would experience sustained championship success that they never experienced in Brooklyn. The Dodgers would return to the World Series in 1963, and swept their archrival in the New York Yankees for their next championship. The Dodgers would then go on to win six more World Series championships in Los Angeles afterwards.

As of 2025, this is the last time that either the Cubs or White Sox lost in the World Series. The White Sox returned to the postseason in 1983, but lost in the ALCS to the eventual World Series champion Baltimore Orioles in four games. The White Sox would eventually return to the World Series in 2005, sweeping the Houston Astros to end an 88-year championship drought.

This was the last meeting between teams from Chicago and Los Angeles for a major professional sports championship until the 1991 NBA Finals.

== See also ==
- 1959 Japan Series
- Curse of the Black Sox

== Sources ==
- Cohen, Richard M.; Neft, David S. (1990). The World Series: Complete Play-By-Play of Every Game, 1903–1989. New York: St. Martin's Press. pp. 275–280. ISBN 0-312-03960-3.
- Reichler, Joseph (1982). The Baseball Encyclopedia (5th ed.). Macmillan Publishing. p. 2167. ISBN 0-02-579010-2.
