= 1959 National League tie-breaker series =

1959 best-of-three tie-breaker series in Major League Baseball

Team (Wins)	Manager(s)	Season
Los Angeles Dodgers (2)	Walter Alston	86–68 (.558)
Milwaukee Braves (0)	Fred Haney	86–68 (.558)
- Dates: September 28–29, 1959
- Venue: Los Angeles Memorial Coliseum (Los Angeles); Milwaukee County Stadium (Milwaukee)
- Umpires: Al Barlick, Augie Donatelli, Dusty Boggess, Jocko Conlan, Bill Jackowski, Tom Gorman
- Hall of Famers: Dodgers: Don Drysdale; Sandy Koufax; Duke Snider; Gil Hodges; Braves: Hank Aaron; Eddie Mathews; Red Schoendienst; Enos Slaughter; Warren Spahn

Broadcast
- Television: ABC
- TV announcers: George Kell and Bob DeLaney
- Radio: ABC
- Radio announcers: Bob Finnegan and Tony Flynn

The 1959 National League tie-breaker series was a best-of-three playoff series that extended Major League Baseball's (MLB) 1959 regular season to decide the winner of the National League (NL) pennant. The tiebreaker series was necessary after the Los Angeles Dodgers and Milwaukee Braves finished the season with identical win–loss records of 86–68 (.558) on September 27, three games ahead of the San Francisco Giants. It was the first tie-breaker in the majors in eight years, also in the National League.

The tie-breaker games were played on September 28 and 29. All the games were scheduled as day games, the opener on Monday was at Milwaukee County Stadium and the second on Tuesday at Los Angeles Memorial Coliseum. The Dodgers won a coin flip late in the season that gave them home field advantage for the series (games two and three). If needed, the third game was scheduled for Wednesday, September 30. The Dodgers had hoped for night games in Los Angeles to take advantage of the Coliseum's seating capacity. The series was broadcast nationally by ABC television, with George Kell and Bob DeLaney announcing, and ABC radio, with Bob Finnegan and Tony Flynn announcing.

Following a rain-delayed start in Milwaukee, the Dodgers won the first game 3–2, with a solo home run in the sixth by John Roseboro breaking a 2–2 tie and providing the margin of victory. The next day in Los Angeles, the Dodgers took the series and the pennant with another one-run win; they rallied for three runs in the bottom of the ninth to tie and prevailed 6–5 in extra innings. This victory advanced the Dodgers to the World Series, in which they defeated the Chicago White Sox in six games.

In baseball statistics, the tie-breaker series counted as the 155th and 156th regular season games for both teams.

== Background ==
A year earlier in 1958, their first in Los Angeles, the Dodgers posted a 71–83 (.461) win–loss record for seventh place in the eight-team NL, and never held a lead. By contrast, the Braves repeated as NL champions that year with a 92–62 (.597) record and returned to the World Series, where the New York Yankees turned the tables and defeated them in seven games. Despite their success, the Braves made several changes leading into the 1959 season. First, they selected Jim Pisoni in the Rule 5 draft from the Yankees in December 1958, although he returned to the Yankees by May 1959. The Braves then traded with the Philadelphia Phillies for Ted Kazanski, Stan Lopata, and Johnny O'Brien just prior to the season. Finally, the Braves traded for Mickey Vernon from the Cleveland Indians and selected Bobby Ávila, Ray Boone, and Enos Slaughter off of waivers during the 1959 season. The Dodgers traded for Rip Repulski and Wally Moon during the offseason and then acquired Chuck Churn, Solly Drake, and Chuck Essegian during the year.

The NL race was tight throughout the 1959 season between the Braves, Dodgers, and Giants. Neither the Giants nor the Braves ever fell five or more games back of the league leader, and the Dodgers never faced a deficit of six or more. The Dodgers had the best record in games played amongst the three, posting a combined 26–18 record against the other two before the tie-breaker. However, the Dodgers spent just 21 days with at least a share of the lead while the Braves and Giants each led the league for 86 days.

With eight games remaining on Friday morning, September 18, the Giants were at 82–64 (.562) with a two-game lead over the Dodgers and Braves. However, the visiting Dodgers swept the next three games at Seals Stadium, including a Saturday doubleheader which the Los Angeles Times described as a "breeze" for Los Angeles. Giants' starting pitcher Sam Jones threw a no-hitter on Saturday, September 26, which was cut short by rain in the eighth inning for his 21st win of the season. The Giants had considered pitching Jack Sanford in that game due to Jones' recent heavy pitching workload. Because the game was shortened to less than nine innings it is no longer considered an official no-hitter. The rain also forced the second game of the Giants' scheduled doubleheader that day to be moved, leaving them with two games to play on the final day of the season. The Giants needed to win both games and have the Braves and Dodgers both lose to tie for the lead, but the Giants lost both. Jones' no-hitter was the Giants' only win for the season after September 17 as the team went 1–7 in their final eight games, going from a two-game lead to a three-game deficit. The Braves and Dodgers both went 6–2 in that span to maintain their tie. This included a five-hit complete game by Warren Spahn to win the Braves' final game of the season 3–2. This was Spahn's 21st win of the season and 267th of his career, breaking Eppa Rixey's record for most wins by a left-handed pitcher.

Both the Dodgers and Braves finished the regularly scheduled 154-game season tied with records of 86–68, forcing a tie-breaker to decide the pennant winner. The two teams' managers flipped a coin to decide home field advantage and Dodgers' manager Walt Alston won. The Dodgers opted to play the second and third (if necessary) games at home, choosing to play Game 1 in Milwaukee. The tie-breaker was scheduled for the 28th, 29th, and the 30th if necessary, which required moving the start of the World Series from September 30 to October 1. The Giants' falling out of the pennant race avoided a potentially disruptive situation involving their home field. Candlestick Park was under construction during the 1959 season and the Giants did not play there until 1960. However, Giants vice president Chub Feeney had said earlier in the season that if the Giants won the pennant they would play their World Series home games in Candlestick. Several potential problems were suggested with this move including a lack of seating, lack of toilet facilities, and insufficient access roads to the stadium.

The Dodgers were 12–10 against the Braves overall for the season, though the Braves outscored them by a single run (96–95) in those games. The Braves were a 5–8 betting favorite in Las Vegas on September 25 to win the pennant while the Dodgers had 6–5 odds. The World Series odds were evenly split, with 11–10 odds available at that time for either the Chicago White Sox (the American League champion) or the eventual NL pennant winner.

== Series summary ==
=== Game 1 ===
Monday, September 28, 1959 2:17 pm (CT) at Milwaukee County Stadium in Milwaukee, Wisconsin
Team	1	2	3	4	5	6	7	8	9	R	H	E
Los Angeles	1	0	1	0	0	1	0	0	0	3	10	1
Milwaukee	0	2	0	0	0	0	0	0	0	2	6	0
WP: Larry Sherry (7–2) LP: Carl Willey (5–9); Home runs: LAD: John Roseboro (10); MIL: None; Attendance: 18,297

Chicago White Sox manager Al López watched the game along with his pitching coach to scout their potential NL opponents for the World Series. The start was delayed 45 minutes due to rain, leaving only 18,297 fans in the stadium once the game was underway. The Dodgers opened the game quickly as Charlie Neal singled with one out, advanced to second base on a ground out, and scored on a single by Norm Larker to give the Dodgers an early 1–0 lead. Dodgers starter Danny McDevitt held the Braves scoreless in the first inning, but was driven from the game in the second. After a line out to open the inning Johnny Logan walked, Del Crandall singled, and Bill Bruton singled to bring home Logan and tie the game at 1. Larry Sherry entered in relief of McDevitt, who pitched just 1 1/3 innings. Carl Willey, the Braves' pitcher, reached base on an error to load the bases. Crandall then scored on a ground out by Bobby Ávila to give the Braves a 2–1 lead before Sherry finished out the second.

The Dodgers re-tied the game the next inning, however. Neal singled with one out and Wally Moon grounded into a force out at second base. Moon then advanced to second on a Larker single and scored on a Gil Hodges single to tie it at 2. Don Demeter hit a single, the third consecutive and fourth of the inning, to load the bases but John Roseboro flew out to end the inning without further scoring. Sherry held the Braves scoreless in the bottom of the third, opening the inning with a walk but then inducing a double play and a foul out to quickly close it. Sherry and Willey traded scoreless innings in the fourth and fifth although the Braves threatened against Sherry in both innings, allowing two base-runners each time but escaping with no runs. Roseboro led off the top of the sixth inning with a home run to give the Dodgers a 3–2 lead. Roseboro had also hit a home run the day before against the Chicago Cubs, a game the Dodgers won to force the tie-breaker. Willey put out the next three batters to quickly end the inning, but the damage had been done.

Sherry pitched a perfect top of the sixth and Don McMahon relieved Willey in the bottom of the frame. The Dodgers could not add to their lead in facing McMahon, he held their run total at three. Sherry, however, was nearly perfect for the remainder of the game, allowing just one single to the Braves over the final three innings. The Los Angeles Times labeled Sherry and Roseboro the "heroes" of the game. Sherry's only "horrible moment", according to the Times, was a long fly ball by Bill Bruton to the deepest part of center field which Demeter managed to haul in for the first out of the bottom of the ninth.

=== Game 2 ===
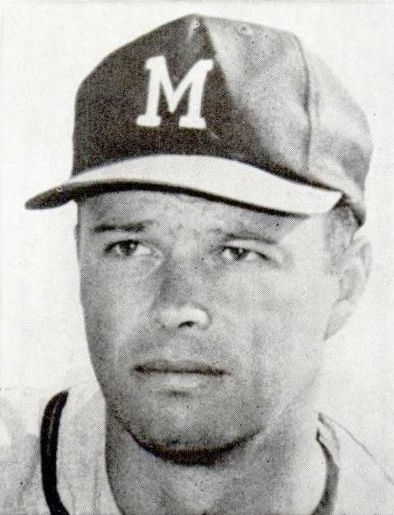
Eddie Mathews scored the first run of the game and later hit his league-leading 46th home run, but his Braves ultimately lost the game and the pennant 6–5 in extra innings.

Tuesday, September 29, 1959 2:00 pm (PT) at Los Angeles Memorial Coliseum in Los Angeles, California
Team	1	2	3	4	5	6	7	8	9	10	11	12	R	H	E
Milwaukee	2	1	0	0	1	0	0	1	0	0	0	0	5	10	2
Los Angeles	1	0	0	1	0	0	0	0	3	0	0	1	6	15	2
WP: Stan Williams (5–5) LP: Bob Rush (5–6); Home runs: MIL: Eddie Mathews (46); LAD: Charlie Neal (19); Attendance: 36,528

The Dodgers had proposed playing Game 2 at night to allow a longer rest period following the travel from Milwaukee to southern California. The Braves took issue with this prior to the start of the series, however, and NL president Warren Giles insisted that all the games were to be played during the day. The afternoon crowd was 36,528, well below the seating capacity of the Coliseum, which exceeded 90,000.

The Braves opened the scoring in the top of the first inning. Eddie Mathews drew a one out walk and Hank Aaron followed that with a double. Aaron's double drew some argument, however, as outfielder Duke Snider recovered Aaron's ball quickly and threw to second. Dodgers' second baseman Charlie Neal believed he had easily tagged out Aaron, but umpire Augie Donatelli said Neal had missed the tag entirely. Frank Torre then singled to score the two runners and give the Braves the early 2–0 lead. The Dodgers responded in their half of the inning, however. Neal hit a deep fly ball to right center field with one out, reaching third base "easily" for a triple as outfielder Bill Bruton missed catching the ball on a difficult play. Wally Moon then singled to score Neal, but was caught stealing for the second out and Snider struck out to end the first inning. Johnny Logan led off the second for the Braves with a single. Then, after two outs, Logan scored on an odd error charged to Snider in center field. The Braves' starting pitcher Lew Burdette hit a single up the middle and Logan had attempted to advance from first to third base on the play. Snider threw the ball in from center to third baseman Jim Gilliam, but Gilliam's vision was "obstructed" and the throw "escaped" him, allowing Logan to score and Burdette to advance to third. Bruton grounded out to end the inning with the Braves in a 3–1 lead.

The game went scoreless in the third inning, but Neal led off the bottom of the fourth with a home run to make it 3–2. The Dodgers threatened further that inning, getting runners on first and second base, though did not score additional runs. Dodgers' starter Don Drysdale recorded the first out of the top of the fifth but then gave up a home run to Mathews and walked Aaron before being relieved by Johnny Podres. Podres escaped without further scoring, putting out Torre and Andy Pafko who pinch hit for Lee Maye. The sixth inning was uneventful, though the Braves then threatened in the top of the seventh. After the first out Mathews singled to start the offense. Aaron followed that with a single, Mathews was put out trying to advance to third base on a "brilliant throw" by Moon, and Aaron moved to second on the throw. Then Podres threw a wild pitch as Torre batted, allowing Aaron to move to third. Finally, Podres walked Torre and was replaced by Chuck Churn. Enos Slaughter pinch hit for Pafko but hit a flyout to end the threat and the inning. John DeMerit then replaced Slaughter defensively in the bottom of the seventh and Norm Larker singled leading off. However, John Roseboro hit into a ground ball double play to end that threat. Larker crashed into Logan, the Braves' shortstop, trying to break up the double play and Logan had to be carried from the field on a stretcher. Félix Mantilla, the second baseman, moved to play shortstop and Red Schoendienst entered to play second. Finally Churn struck out Burdette to end the seventh.

The Braves scored their fifth run in the eighth as Del Crandall hit a one-out triple and then scored on a sacrifice fly by Mantilla. Don Demeter pinch hit for Churn, the pitcher, in the bottom half of the inning but the Dodgers were put out in order. Sandy Koufax pitched the top of the ninth for the Dodgers and though he loaded the bases with three successive walks to Aaron, Torre, and DeMerit he did not allow any runs. Moon and Snider led off the bottom of the frame with successive singles. Bob Lillis pinch ran for Snider and Gil Hodges hit another single to load the bases. Don McMahon relieved Burdette, but allowed a fourth consecutive single to Norm Larker which scored Moon, Lillis, and advanced Hodges to third leaving it 5–4. Warren Spahn relieved McMahon, Carl Furillo pinch hit for Roseboro, and Joe Pignatano pinch ran for Larker. Furillo tied the game, hitting a sacrifice fly which scored Hodges. Spahn allowed a single to Wills and was pulled in favor of Joey Jay. Ron Fairly grounded out as a pinch hitter and Gilliam flew out, leaving the game tied at five runs apiece and forcing extra innings.

Following the heavy substitutions in the bottom of the ninth the Dodgers made several defensive moves in the top of the tenth. Stan Williams entered as the pitcher, Pignatano came in as the catcher, Moon moved from right to left field, and Fairly and Furillo took over center and right field respectively. The tenth went by quickly with only a single baserunner, but both teams threatened in the eleventh. Mathews was walked with one out in the top half. Aaron grounded into a force out at second, then advanced to second on a passed ball to Torre. The Dodgers intentionally walked Torre. Al Spangler then drew a pinch hit walk to load the bases, but Joe Adcock grounded out to end the half-inning. Pignatano was hit by a pitch and Furillo walked to open the bottom half. After two flyball outs Joey Jay walked Gilliam, loading the bases, but Bob Rush relieved him and got Neal to ground out ending the inning. The Braves went quickly again in the twelfth, retired in order. Rush recorded the first two outs of the twelfth, but then walked Hodges. Hodges then advanced to second on a Pignatano single. Finally, he scored on a single by Furillo followed by a throwing error by the shortstop Mantilla to give the Dodgers a 6–5 walk-off victory and the National League pennant.

The miscue was Mantilla's second since he had replaced shortstop Johnny Logan, who was shaken up on a double play in the seventh inning. The Chicago Tribune noted the impact of Logan's injury as it was his replacement who made the costly final error. Mantilla was "close to tears" after the game, saying the ball "took a crazy bounce... before I got it." However, Braves' manager Fred Haney insisted Mantilla "didn't make a bad play," that he was "lucky to stop the ball at all," and that the run would have scored even if Mantilla had delivered a perfect throw.

== Aftermath ==
The Dodgers' win earned the franchise its tenth playoff berth, the first since the team moved to Los Angeles the previous year. In the playoffs they faced the Chicago White Sox in the 1959 World Series which they won in six games. The Dodgers faced another tie-breaker in 1962, but lost to the Giants, who would lose to the New York Yankees in the 1962 World Series in seven games. The Dodgers have appeared in six of the ten NL tie-breakers, more tie-breaker appearances than any franchise in either league.

The Braves' high-water mark while in Milwaukee had been their World Series win in 1957. They had also appeared in the 1958 Series, losing to the Yankees. After failing to win the pennant in 1959, the Braves would not play for a championship again until they moved to Atlanta. They next returned to post-season play in 1969, their fourth season in Atlanta, where they were swept in the League Championship Series. The Braves returned to the World Series again in the 1990s, losing the 1991, 1992, 1996, and 1999 World Series but winning in 1995.

In baseball statistics tie-breakers counted as regular season games, with all events in them added to regular season statistics. For example, Eddie Mathews overtook Ernie Banks of the Chicago Cubs for the league lead in home runs, hitting his 46th of the season in Game 2. Banks won the NL Most Valuable Player Award but Mathews, Hank Aaron, and Wally Moon finished 2nd, 3rd, and 4th respectively in the voting. Aaron, Del Crandall, Gil Hodges, and Charlie Neal all won Gold Gloves for their fielding ability. MLB played two All-Star Games in 1959. Five Braves and two Dodgers were named to the first while six Braves and four Dodgers played in the second. Five future Hall of Famers were on the Braves roster in 1959 (Aaron, Mathews, Schoendienst, Slaughter, Spahn) while the Dodgers had four (Drysdale, Koufax, Snider, Hodges). Dodgers' manager Walt Alston was also inducted to the Hall as a manager in 1983.
