= Ron Hansen (baseball) =

American baseball player (born 1938)

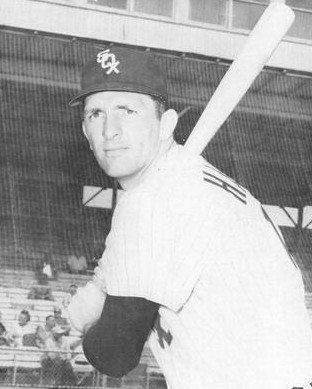
- Shortstop
- Born: April 5, 1938 (age 88); Oxford, Nebraska, U.S.
- Batted: Right Threw: Right

MLB debut
- April 15, 1958, for the Baltimore Orioles

Last MLB appearance
- June 20, 1972, for the Kansas City Royals

MLB statistics
- Batting average: .234
- Home runs: 106
- Runs batted in: 501
- Stats at Baseball Reference

Teams
- Baltimore Orioles (1958–1962); Chicago White Sox (1963–1967); Washington Senators (1968); Chicago White Sox (1968–1969); New York Yankees (1970–1971); Kansas City Royals (1972)

Career highlights and awards
- 2× All-Star (1960, 1960²); AL Rookie of the Year (1960)

Ronald Lavern Hansen (born April 5, 1938) is an American former shortstop in Major League Baseball who played for the Baltimore Orioles (1958–1962), Chicago White Sox (1963–1967, 1968–1969), Washington Senators (1968), New York Yankees (1970–1971) and Kansas City Royals (1972). He batted and threw right-handed. In a 15-season career, Hansen was a .234 hitter with 106 home runs and 501 RBI in 1384 games.

Hansen's career was hampered throughout and was eventually cut short by chronic back ailments and other injuries. Despite being a tall shortstop at 6 ft 3 in (1.91 m), 190 lb (86 kg), Hansen was fluid and smooth in the field. He was a competent hitter as well.

Hansen was born in Oxford, Nebraska, on April 5, 1938, and moved with his family to Albany, California, when he was age 2. He was a three-sport star in baseball, basketball and football at Albany High School where he graduated in 1955. He signed with the Orioles on April 7, 1956, after declining a scholarship to the University of California, Berkeley.

A case of sciatica forced him to miss the entire 1957 season, costing him his first chance to make the Orioles. His major-league debut came in a 6–1 win over the Washington Senators in the 1958 season opener at Memorial Stadium on April 15. His first hit in the majors was a single to center field off Pedro Ramos in the sixth inning of another season-opening victory over the Senators in the same ballpark two years later on April 19, 1960. Between the two milestones, he appeared in only 14 games in the majors and established an Orioles record among position players by going hitless in his first 25 at-bats to begin his career with the ballclub.

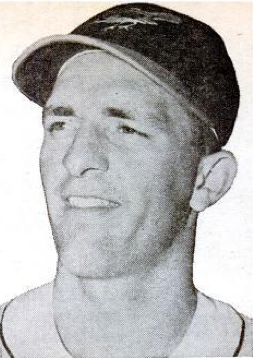
Hansen in 1960

Hansen surpassed all expectations by turning in a solid, injury-free 1960 season, filling the Orioles urgent need for a quality shortstop. He appeared in 153 games, and finished with 22 home runs, 86 RBI, 22 doubles, five triples, a .255 batting average and a .342 on-base percentage, batting from the eight spot.

When Hansen was named the starting shortstop for the American League team in the 1960 Major League Baseball All-Star Game, he became only the seventh rookie player in MLB history to start in an All-Star Game and one of only 27 rookies overall. He also earned American League Rookie of the Year honors, getting 22 of 24 votes, as well as the TSN Rookie of the Year Award.

Hansen led AL shortstops in double plays in 1961, hitting 12 home runs with 51 RBI in 155 games. In the fall of 1961, Hansen was recalled for military service. Before the 1963 season, he was sent to the White Sox along with knuckleballer Hoyt Wilhelm in the same trade that brought Luis Aparicio to the Orioles.

With Chicago, Hansen led the AL twice more in double plays and four times in assists. During a doubleheader in 1965, he tied an AL record with 18 total chances in the first game and added 10 more in the second for a total of 28, to set a major league record for a doubleheader.

In 1964, Hansen posted career-highs in batting average (.261), runs (85), hits (160) and doubles (25), and belted 20 home runs with 68 RBI. In 1965 he led the league with 162 games played, but was out again with back problems in 1966, appearing in only 23 games. He underwent surgery for a ruptured spinal disc and returned in 1967, playing in 157 games.

In February 1968, Hansen was sent to the Senators as part of a six-player trade, with infielder Tim Cullen being one of the players received by the White Sox. On July 30, while playing for the Senators in a game against the Cleveland Indians, Hansen turned the eighth unassisted triple play in major league history and the first in 41 years. In the bottom of the first inning, Hansen caught a line drive off the bat of Joe Azcue, touched second base to put out Dave Nelson, then tagged Russ Snyder coming from first base. In the at-bats following the triple play, Hansen struck out six consecutive times – four times on July 30, and twice more on July 31. On August 1 he hit a grand slam home run, and the following day, batting .185, was traded back to the White Sox. Hansen was exchanged for Cullen, the first time in MLB history where two players were traded for each other twice in the same season.

Again with the White Sox, Hansen served in a backup role for the rest of the 1968 season, and again in 1969. He then finished his career as a utility infielder with the New York Yankees and the Kansas City Royals. After retiring as a player, he stayed involved with baseball, serving at different times as a major league coach and minor league manager, and also as an advance scout for the Yankees and then the Philadelphia Phillies, until retiring in 2010. During his work with the Phillies, Hansen was in the stands at Progressive Field in Cleveland on May 12, 2008, when Indians second baseman Asdrúbal Cabrera made his unassisted triple play, against the Toronto Blue Jays.
