= 1960 Major League Baseball All-Star Game =

1960 Major League Baseball All-Star Game may refer to:

- The 1960 Major League Baseball All-Star Game (first game), a 5–3 victory for the National League over the American League
- The 1960 Major League Baseball All-Star Game (second game), a 6–0 victory for the National League over the American League
