= Charlie Neal =

American baseball player (1931–1996)

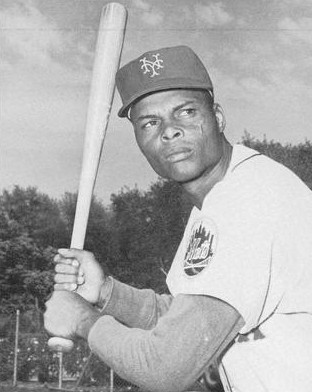
- Second baseman
- Born: January 30, 1931; Longview, Texas, U.S.
- Died: November 18, 1996 (aged 65); Dallas, Texas, U.S.
- Batted: Right Threw: Right

MLB debut
- April 17, 1956, for the Brooklyn Dodgers

Last MLB appearance
- September 29, 1963, for the Cincinnati Reds

MLB statistics
- Batting average: .259
- Home runs: 87
- Runs batted in: 391
- Stats at Baseball Reference

Teams
- Brooklyn / Los Angeles Dodgers (1956–1961); New York Mets (1962–1963); Cincinnati Reds (1963)

Career highlights and awards
- 3× All-Star (1959²–1960²); World Series champion (1959); Gold Glove Award (1959)

Charles Lenard Neal (January 30, 1931 – November 18, 1996) was an American professional baseball player, a second baseman and shortstop who had an eight-season career (1956–1963) in Major League Baseball.

Signed by the Brooklyn Dodgers as an amateur in 1950, Neal helped the Los Angeles Dodgers win the 1959 World Series just one year after the team moved to Southern California in 1958. His two home runs off Bob Shaw of the Chicago White Sox in Game 2 at Comiskey Park were keys to turning the tide of the 1959 Series. Chicago had won Game 1, 11–0, and held a 2–0 lead in the fifth inning of the second game when Neal connected for a solo homer, accounting for the Dodgers' first run of the Fall Classic. Two innings later, after pinch hitter Chuck Essegian had tied the contest at two with another solo home run, Neal belted his second long ball of the game, a two-run blast with Jim Gilliam on base. That homer was the winning blow in a 4–3 Dodger victory; Los Angeles went on to take Games 3, 4 and 6 to win the world championship.

== Early baseball career ==
Neal was born in Longview, Texas. While still in high school, he played for the Negro league Atlanta Black Crackers. He threw and batted right-handed and was listed as 5 feet 10 inches (1.78 m) tall and 165 pounds (75 kg), but despite his slight stature, Neal was a productive power hitter during his 14-year professional career, notching 151 home runs at the major and minor-league levels. As a 23-year-old prospect in the Triple-A American Association in 1954, Neal hit 18 homers and batted .274. During the 1954–55 offseason, the Boston Red Sox reportedly offered the Dodgers $100,000 for Neal's contract, but were rebuffed; had the deal materialized, Neal would likely have become the Red Sox' first African-American player.

Neal joined the Dodgers at the start of the 1956 season and batted .287 in 62 games played, largely as a backup second baseman behind Gilliam. He started Game 3 of the 1956 World Series, going hitless in four at bats against Whitey Ford and making an error in the field, which led to an unearned run. In 1957, the Dodgers' last year in Brooklyn, Neal enjoyed an outstanding sophomore campaign, getting into 128 games and starting 100 at shortstop, with future Baseball Hall of Famer Pee Wee Reese shifting to third base. He batted .270 with 12 home runs. In 1958, he belted 22 home runs, 14 at his new home field, the Los Angeles Memorial Coliseum, as the Dodgers' starting second baseman.

== Standout 1959 season ==
Then, in 1959, Neal had his finest and most memorable season. He collected 177 hits, with 83 runs batted in, 17 stolen bases, and a .287 batting average, all career highs. He also hit 19 home runs. Neal led the National League in sacrifice hits and triples. In the field, he won a Gold Glove at second base. After helping the Dodgers tie the defending NL champion Milwaukee Braves by the close of the 154-game, regular-season schedule, Neal played a key role in sweeping the Braves in the 1959 National League tie-breaker series with five hits in 12 at bats, including a home run in the clinching Game 2. He earned his world championship ring by hitting .370 with ten hits in the six-game World Series victory over the White Sox. In that series, he played before the largest crowd in World Series history, 92,706, in Game 5 at the Los Angeles Coliseum. (His 1956 World Series appearance in Game 3 came before a Yankee Stadium throng of 73,977, which is still one of the ten biggest crowds in Fall Classic history.) Neal also appeared in the second 1959 All-Star Game, played at the Coliseum on August 3.

Neal was the Dodgers' starting second baseman in both 1960 and 1961 and played in each of 1960's MLB All-Star games, but his production declined; he hit .256 and .235 with only 18 total home runs in 247 games played. After the 1961 season, the Dodgers traded him to the New York Mets, then a first-year expansion team, for outfielder Lee Walls and cash. Neal was the regular second baseman for the Mets' maiden 1962 team that lost 120 games, the most by a team in a single season since the 19th Century. He was in the inaugural Met starting lineup on April 11, 1962, at St. Louis, batting third, going 3-for-4 and getting the first RBI in the team's history.

Neal remained a Met until July 1, 1963, when he was traded to the Cincinnati Reds. After he hit just .156 for the rest of that season, Neal was released by the Reds in spring training of 1964, his career over at age 33. As a major leaguer, Neal appeared in 970 games and batted .259 lifetime with 858 hits, 113 doubles, 38 triples, 87 home runs, and 391 runs batted in. He was hitless in two at-bats in All-Star competition.

Charlie Neal died in Dallas of heart failure at age 65.

== See also ==
- List of Major League Baseball annual triples leaders
- List of Negro league baseball players who played in Major League Baseball
