= Stan Williams (baseball) =

American baseball player (1936–2021)

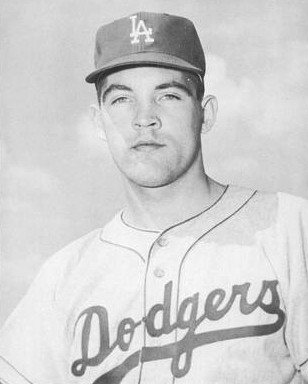
- Pitcher
- Born: September 14, 1936; Enfield, New Hampshire, U.S.
- Died: February 20, 2021 (aged 84); Laughlin, Nevada, U.S.
- Batted: Right Threw: Right

MLB debut
- May 17, 1958, for the Los Angeles Dodgers

Last MLB appearance
- August 1, 1972, for the Boston Red Sox

MLB statistics
- Win–loss record: 109–94
- Earned run average: 3.48
- Strikeouts: 1,305
- Stats at Baseball Reference

Teams
- As player: Los Angeles Dodgers (1958–1962); New York Yankees (1963–1964); Cleveland Indians (1965, 1967–1969); Minnesota Twins (1970–1971); St. Louis Cardinals (1971); Boston Red Sox (1972); As coach: Boston Red Sox (1975–1976); Chicago White Sox (1977–1978); New York Yankees (1980–1982); Cincinnati Reds (1984); New York Yankees (1987–1988); Cincinnati Reds (1990–1991); Seattle Mariners (1998–1999)

Career highlights and awards
- 2× All-Star (1960, 1960²); 2× World Series champion (1959, 1990)

Stanley Wilson Williams (September 14, 1936 – February 20, 2021), nicknamed "Big Daddy" and "the Big Hurt", was an American professional baseball pitcher who played 14 seasons in Major League Baseball (MLB). He stood 6 feet 5 inches (1.96 m) tall and weighed 230 pounds (100 kg) during an active career spent with the Los Angeles Dodgers, New York Yankees, Cleveland Indians, Minnesota Twins, St. Louis Cardinals and Boston Red Sox between 1958 and 1972. He batted and threw right-handed and was a two-time World Series champion. After his playing days, Williams was a pitching coach for another 14 seasons for five Major League teams.

== Early life ==
Williams was born in Enfield, New Hampshire, on September 14, 1936. He was the youngest of four children of Irving, a construction worker, and Evelyn. The Williams family moved to Denver when he was three years old. He attended East High School, where he played baseball and football. He was signed as an amateur free agent by the Brooklyn Dodgers before the 1954 season.

== Professional career ==
Williams played in the minor leagues from the 1954 to 1958 seasons. He made his MLB debut on May 17, 1958, at the age of 21, relieving Sandy Koufax and giving up three earned runs and striking out one over 3 innings in a 10–1 loss to the St. Louis Cardinals. He finished his rookie year with a 9–7 win–loss record, 4.01 earned run average (ERA), and 80 strikeouts over 119 innings pitched.

Williams had a significant impact in two Dodgers playoff series. After finishing in a tie for first place with the Milwaukee Braves in 1959, the teams met in a best-of-three playoff. After winning the first game, the Dodgers rallied with three runs in the bottom of the ninth inning to tie game 2 at 5–5. Williams came on in the 10th inning and tossed three scoreless innings without allowing a hit; he was the winning pitcher as the Dodgers scored in the bottom of the 12th to win the pennant.

In the 1962 best-of-three playoff against the San Francisco Giants, Williams was not as successful. In game 2, he blew the save as the Giants tied the game with two runs in the eighth inning, but earned the win when the Dodgers scored in the bottom of the ninth to win 8–7. In the decisive third game, the Dodgers were leading in the top of the ninth 4–2. Williams entered the game with the score 4–3, bases loaded, and one out. Williams gave up a sacrifice fly to Orlando Cepeda that tied the game, then threw a wild pitch and issued an intentional walk that re-loaded the bases. He then walked Jim Davenport to force in what turned out to be the series winning run before he gave way to Ron Perranoski.

Williams, a 1960 All-Star, built a career record of 109–94 in 482 games and 208 starts. He got the majority of his wins with the Dodgers in the early stages of his 14-year career. He was traded from the Dodgers to the New York Yankees for Bill Skowron at the Winter Meetings on November 26, 1962. He compiled a career ERA of 3.48 and had 42 career complete games with 11 shutouts; he was credited with 42 saves as a relief pitcher. Williams gave up 682 earned runs in 1,7641/3 innings pitched, with 1,305 career strikeouts. Williams won a World Series with the Dodgers in 1959, his second year in the big leagues.

Although his control often kept him from being a top pitcher, Williams' presence on the mound was huge, and many batters around the league feared the six-foot, five-inch right-hander, who had a blistering fastball and was not afraid to pitch inside. In 1961, Williams finished second in the National League in strikeouts with 205, behind teammate Sandy Koufax (269). Yet another Dodger pitcher, Don Drysdale, finished third that year (182).

Williams was a key member of the Indians' pitching staff from 1967 to 1969. He had a 13–11 record in 1968, and led the Indians' staff in appearances in 1969. In 1970, he went 10–1 on the season in relief, with a 1.99 ERA, for the Twins. Williams played his final major league game on August 1, 1972, just over a month before his 36th birthday. He finished his final season with a 6.23 ERA and three strikeouts in just three games for the Boston Red Sox.

Williams appeared in two World Series as a player. In 1959, facing the Chicago White Sox, he threw two hitless innings in relief of Koufax in Game 5. Chicago won that game, 1–0, but the Dodgers took the next game to win the world championship. Williams later played as a Yankee against the Dodgers in the 1963 series. In Game 1, he came in for Whitey Ford, with Los Angeles leading 5–0. Williams allowed only one hit over three innings, but the Dodgers prevailed 5–2 behind Koufax' 15 strikeouts. They eventually swept the Yankees in four straight games.

== Pitching coach ==
After retiring from playing, Williams served as a pitching coach for 14 MLB seasons, with the Red Sox, Yankees, White Sox, Seattle Mariners and Cincinnati Reds. More recently he was an advance scout for the Tampa Bay Devil Rays until he was let go at the end of the 2006 season. He was an advance scout for the Washington Nationals in 2010, before retiring from baseball altogether.

Tommy John observed that Williams did not relate well to sinkerball pitchers, like John, because Williams's style of pitching had been to throw hard. However, John respected Williams for his work ethic and noted that he was a great pitching coach for pitchers like Ron Guidry.

== Later life ==
Williams was inducted into the Colorado Sports Hall of Fame in April 2013. He resided in Lakewood, California, before relocating to Nevada in December 2020. He died on February 20, 2021, at his home in Laughlin, Nevada. He was 84, and suffered from cardio-pulmonary illness prior to his death.

Sporting positions
| Preceded by Lee Stange | Boston Red Sox pitching coach 1975–1976 | Succeeded by Al Jackson |
| Preceded by Ken Silvestri | Chicago White Sox pitching coach 1977–1978 | Succeeded by Fred Martin |
| Preceded by Art Fowler | New York Yankees pitching coach 1980–1981 | Succeeded by Clyde King |
| Preceded by Bill Fischer; Scott Breeden | Cincinnati Reds pitching coach 1984; 1990–1991 | Succeeded by Jim Kaat; Larry Rothschild |
| Preceded by Nardi Contreras | Seattle Mariners pitching coach 1998–1999 | Succeeded by Bryan Price |
