= Vern Law =

American baseball player (born 1930)

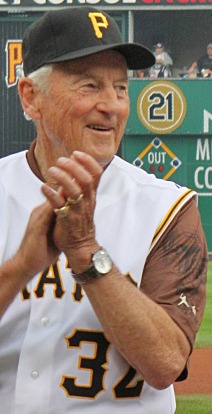
- Law at PNC Park in 2010
- Pitcher
- Born: March 12, 1930 (age 96); Meridian, Idaho, U.S.
- Batted: Right Threw: Right

MLB debut
- June 11, 1950, for the Pittsburgh Pirates

Last MLB appearance
- August 20, 1967, for the Pittsburgh Pirates

MLB statistics
- Win–loss record: 162–147
- Earned run average: 3.77
- Strikeouts: 1,092
- Stats at Baseball Reference

Teams
- Pittsburgh Pirates (1950–1951, 1954–1967)

Career highlights and awards
- 2× All-Star (1960, 1960²); World Series champion (1960); Cy Young Award (1960); Pittsburgh Pirates Hall of Fame

Vernon Sanders Law (born March 12, 1930) is an American former professional baseball pitcher who played sixteen seasons in Major League Baseball (MLB) for the Pittsburgh Pirates. He batted and threw right-handed and was listed at 6 feet 2 inches (1.88 m) and 195 pounds (88 kg). Law signed for the Pirates as an amateur free agent in 1948 and made his major-league debut in 1950; he served in the Korean War in 1952 and 1953 before returning to the majors in 1954. In 1960, he won both the Cy Young Award and a World Series ring as a member of the Pirates; he was the first Pirate to win the Cy Young Award. He is currently the oldest living Cy Young Award winner. In 1965, he won the Lou Gehrig Award and the Associated Press's National League Comeback Player of the Year Award. A control pitcher, he finished among the top three National League pitchers in bases on ball per nine innings pitched in multiple seasons. Law was inducted into the Pirates Hall of Fame in August 2025. At the time, he was the 11th oldest living Major League player.

== Early life ==
Law was born on March 12, 1930, in Meridian, Idaho. Law attended Meridian High School, where he pitched on the baseball team. As a senior in 1948, he pitched three no-hit, no-run games, and was one of the top pitching prospects in the country. Toward the end of his high school pitching career in 1948, the largest crowd in Meridian High history came to watch the 6 ft 2 in (1.88 m) 195 lb. (88.5 kg) or 6 ft 3 in (1.91 m) 190 lb. (86.2 kg) Law pitch against another Border League high school team.

Law's brother Evan Law was a catcher at Boise Junior College when Law was a senior in high school. Within a day of graduating high school, Law and his brother were pursued by scouts from 10 different MLB teams, including former MLB player Floyd "Babe" Herman, who scouted the brothers for the Pittsburgh Pirates. Pirates scout Bill Posedel was also involved in recruiting the Laws.

Popular singer, radio star and movie star Bing Crosby was part owner of the Pirates at the time. Crosby called the Laws' parents, encouraging them to have their sons join the Pirates. Herman Welcker, who was later a United States senator from Idaho, had recommended Law to Crosby. Welcker and Crosby were friends and had attended Gonzaga University together in Spokane, Washington. Vern and Evan both signed identical contracts in late May 1948 to join the Pirates organization.

== Professional career and military service ==
=== Minor leagues ===
The Pirates originally assigned Law to the Class D Santa Rosa Pirates of the Far West League in 1948. Herman said at the time one benefit of assignment to Santa Rosa was that Posedel, a former Major League pitcher who was based in Vallejo, California, would instruct law with the Santa Rosa, California team. Law had an 8–5 win–loss record with Santa Rosa and 4.66 earned run average (ERA). He struck out 126 batters in 110 innings pitched.

In 1949, Law was assigned to the Class B Davenport Pirates of the Illinois-Indiana-Iowa (Triple-I) League. Evan was assigned to the Greenville Pirates of the Class D Alabama State League, where he played his only season of professional baseball. Law had a 5–11 record, but a 2.94 ERA, with 123 strikeouts in 144 innings pitched. In 1950, Vern was assigned to the Double-A New Orleans Pelicans. He was 6–4, with a 2.67 ERA in 12 games.

=== Pittsburgh Pirates ===
==== 1950–1956 ====
The 20-year old Law was called up to the Pirates in June 1950. He pitched in 27 games for the Pirates, starting 17 games. Law had a 7–9 record, with a 4.92 ERA, for a team with a 57–96 record. In 1951, he pitched in 28 games for the Pirates, starting 14. He had a 6–9 record, with a 4.50 ERA, and one shutout, for the 64–90 1951 Pirates. He injured his right rotator cuff pitching before and after a rain delay in a game against the Chicago Cubs that season. Without proper knowledge of how to treat the injury, Law was subjected to having his tonsils removed as one means to deal with the pain, instead of therapeutic techniques that would actually have a benefit.

Law voluntarily enlisted in the United States Army during the Korean War, and he did not play Major League Baseball in 1952 and 1953. The arm soreness he had during the 1951 season was no longer a problem going into the 1954 season. In 1954, Law returned to the Pirates and pitched in 39 games, starting 18. He had 7 complete games, and three saves, with a 5.51 ERA. He had 56 bases on balls and 57 strikeouts in 161.2 innings pitched. The Pirates finished the season 53–101. In mid-June, the Chicago Cubs and St. Louis Cardinals had shown some interest in trading for Law, but no trade occurred.

Law improved in 1955, with a 3.81 ERA and 10–10 record, pitching in 43 games and starting 24. This was the first time in his Major League career that his ERA was below 4.00. He also pitched over 200 innings for the first time (200.2), with 81 strikeouts and 62 bases on balls. The team finished 60–94, but Law was 23rd in NL Most Valuable Player voting.

On July 19, 1955, Law started a game against the Milwaukee Braves that went 19 innings. Law pitched the first 18 innings of the game. He did not allow a run from the fourth inning through the 18th inning, and struck out 12 batters and walked only two. Manager Fred Haney pinch hit for Law in the 18th inning, fearing Law might get a sore arm. Bob Friend pitched the 19th inning for the Pirates and gave up a run. The Pirates scored two runs in the bottom of the 19th inning, however, winning the game; with the victory going to Friend. Five days later, Haney let Law pitch a 10-inning complete game four-hitter against the Chicago Cubs, winning 3–2. The effect of pitching 28 innings in five days showed over the rest of the season, with Law losing six of his last nine games in 1955.

Bobby Bragan replaced Haney as the Pirates' manager in 1956. Going into the season, Bragan considered Law part of his nucleus of starting pitchers. The Pirates had a 66–88 record. Law started 32 of the 39 games in which he pitched, going 8–16, with a 4.32 ERA, 60 strikeouts and 49 walks in 195.2 innings pitched. Law was eighth in the National League in bases on balls per nine innings pitched (2.254).

Bragan continued using Law as a starter in 1957. Law started 25 of the 31 games in which he pitched, and had his first winning record (10–8) in Pittsburgh. Law also had his first below 3.00 ERA season (2.87), and was third in the National League in bases on balls per nine innings pitched (1.668) and fifth in the NL in ERA. The team had a 62–92 season, but Danny Murtaugh replaced Bragan as manager in early August and led the team to a 26–25 record for the remainder of the season.

==== 1958–1967 ====
Murtaugh had been coaching for the Pirates before he replaced Bragan, and at the time was named a temporary replacement as manager. Murtaugh went on to manage the Pirates in over 2,000 more games (1958–1964, 1967, 1970–71, 1973–76). In his first full season, the Pirates were 84–70, their first winning season in 10 years. In 1958, Murtaugh continued using Law primarily as a starter, and Law had another winning season (14–12). Law had a 3.96 ERA in 202.1 innings pitched, giving up 235 hits, with 56 strikeouts and 39 walks. He was again third in the National League in bases on balls per nine innings pitched (1.735).

In 1959 Law was 18–9, with a 2.98 ERA in 266 innings pitched. He started 33 games (with only one relief appearance), completing a career-high 20 games, with two shutouts; striking out 110 batters while walking only 53. He was tied for 19th in NL Most Valuable Player voting. He shared the NL Player of the Month award in August 1959 (4–0, 1.94 ERA, 25 strikeouts) with Willie McCovey. He was second in the National League in WAR for pitchers (6.5), third in win-loss percentage (.667), fifth in ERA and bases on balls per nine innings pitched (1.793); and ninth in strikeouts to bases on balls. He defeated every National League team at least once during the 1959 season.

In 1960, Law won the Cy Young Award, when only one such award was given between both leagues. He helped lead the Pirates to a World Series victory over the New York Yankees, winning two games in the series. He was selected to play on the NL All-Star team in both 1960 All-Star Games, and was the starting and winning pitcher in the July 13 All-Star Game. Law started all 35 games in which he pitched during the season, with a win–loss record of 20–9, and a 3.08 earned run average. His 18 complete games was tied for best among all Major League pitchers. He was second in the National League in WHIP (walks and hits per inning pitched) (1.126); third in wins, winning percentage (.690) and bases on balls per nine innings pitched (1.325); fourth in strikeouts to bases on balls; and seventh in ERA.

Murtaugh chose Law to pitch in Game 1 of the World Series. Law was the winning pitcher in a 6–4 Pirates' victory. He gave up only two runs on 10 hits over seven innings, including a home run to Roger Maris. The Yankees won the next two games, scoring 26 total runs. Law won Game 4, 3–2, giving up two runs on eight hits in 6.2 innings; with reliever Roy Face earning a save. Law started Game 7, giving up three runs on four hits over five innings. The Pirates won in the bottom of the ninth inning on Bill Mazeroski's home run, with Harvey Haddix earning the win for Pittsburgh.

Law had pitched the entire World Series on a bad ankle. When the Pirates clinched the National League pennant on September 25 against the Milwaukee Braves, Law quickly left the locker room and was the first player on the team bus. In light of his practices as a member of The Church of Jesus Christ of the Latter-day Saints, in which he was an elder, Law wanted to avoid the boisterous celebration in the locker room, which included champagne and beer. When some of his teammates joined him on the bus they began what they saw as celebratory horseplay with Law. This included one teammate attempting to pull off Law's tied shoe, twisting Law's ankle as Law tried to resist.

The ankle injury bothered Law throughout the World Series. He was forced to change his natural pitching style and pitched in pain for the rest of the season and the World Series. Because of his weak ankle, and pitching in an unnatural manner to compensate, he tore some rotator muscles in the back of his pitching shoulder during the Series. He thought the injury would heal over the winter, but suffered with shoulder problems and a sore arm by the following season, and he was not the same for several seasons.

In 1961, he pitched only 59.1 innings in 11 games, with a 3–4 record and 4.70 ERA. His shoulder and arm problems kept him from pitching after mid-July. The Pirates fell from World Series winner in 1960, to sixth place in 1961. Murtaugh believed Law's problems were the main cause of the Pirates decline, saying "'Where would any team be if they lost their best pitcher?'"

He improved in 1962, starting 20 games, and pitching 139.1 innings, with a 10–7 record and 3.94 ERA. In April 1963, while trying to get him ready to pitch that season, the Pirates sent the sore armed Law to pitch in warmer weather with the Single-A Kinston Eagles of the Carolina League. He pitched two complete games wins for the Eagles, with a 1.50 ERA, before returning to the Pirates. Law regressed in 1963, however, pitching only 76.2 innings, with a 4–5 record and 4.93 ERA. Murtaugh suggested to Law that rather than lose the respect and dignity he had earned with the team over the years, that Law consider retirement. At the time, Law had employment as a banker. Rather than retire, in January 1964 Law decided to come back the following season.

Whereas he could not pinch without arm soreness in 1963, by early April 1964 he could pitch without pain. In 1964, he had his best season since 1960, starting 29 games and pitching 192 innings. He was 12–13, with a 3.61 ERA. He also returned to the top three in the National League for bases on balls per nine innings pitched (1.500).

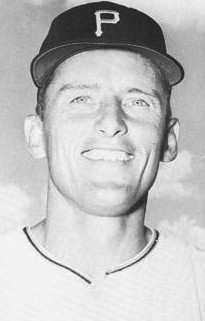
Law in 1965

In 1965, Law returned to his 1959-1960 form. He had a 17–9 record, and a 2.15 ERA in 29 games (28 starts). This was the lowest ERA of his career. He pitched over 200 innings (217.1) for the first time since 1960. He was second in the NL in bases on ball per nine innings pitched (1.449), third in ERA and WHIP (0.998), and eighth in WAR for pitchers, winning percentage and strikeouts to bases on balls. He shared the NL Player of the Month award in June of that year (with Willie Stargell), with a 6–1 record, 0.87 ERA, and 32 strikeouts. He was 17th in NL Most Valuable Player voting.

Law pitched without pain in 1965. He derived a great deal of personal satisfaction from his accomplishments that season because his ability to pitch had fallen into question in the recent past. He also had a greater knowledge of how to pitch in 1965 than he did in 1960, and felt his 1965 season was his best year as a pitcher. After the season, the Associated Press selected Law as the 1965 NL Comeback Player of the Year. In December 1965, Law was unanimously selected by the Phi Delta Theta fraternity to receive the 11th annual Lou Gehrig Award for his 1965 season, based on his contributions both on and off the field. He was selected to receive the award "'on the basis of his indomitable competitive spirit, great strength of character and because, as a man, he commands the respect of his teammates, his competitors and baseball fans everywhere'".

Law started 28 games again in 1966, with a 12–8 record and 4.05 ERA in 177.2 innings pitched. He was second in the NL in bases on balls per nine innings pitched (1.216) and seventh in strikeouts to bases on balls. In his final season, 1967, the 37-year old Law pitched in 25 games, starting in 10. He threw 97 innings, with a 4.18 ERA and 2–6 record.

Law finished his career with a record of 162–147. As a hitter, Law posted a .216 batting average (191-for-883) with 96 runs, 35 doubles, 7 triples, 11 home runs, 90 RBI and drawing 41 bases on balls. In the 1960 World Series, he batted .333 (2-for-6) with a run scored and one RBI. He was better than average defensively, recording a .972 fielding percentage, which was 16 points higher than the league average at his position.

== Coaching career ==
Following his retirement, Law served as the Pirates’ pitching coach for two seasons before becoming an assistant baseball coach at Brigham Young University (BYU), in which capacity he served for nine years, mentoring Jack Morris, among others. In December 1978, he accepted a position as pitching coach for the Seibu Lions of the Nippon Professional Baseball (NPB). Three years later, Law returned to the United States as a coach for the Portland Beavers of the Pacific Coast League, moving in 1983 to the Denver Bears of the American Association, where he would remain for one season before being handed the team's managerial reins in 1984. An extended midseason slump led to his dismissal on July 3, replaced by coach Adrian Garrett.

== Legacy and honors ==
In August 2025, Law was inducted into the Pittsburgh Pirates Hall of Fame, along with Kiki Cuyler and Al Oliver. He was the first Pirate to win a Cy Young Award (1960), and remains one of only three Pirates to do so, along with Doug Drabek (1990) and Paul Skenes (2025). In 1965, he also won the Lou Gehrig Award and Associated Press NL Comeback Player of the Year Award. On being inducted into the Pirates Hall of Fame, the 95-year old Law called it "'the capstone of my career'". At the time of his induction, he was the 11th oldest living Major League player.

After winning the World Series in 1960, a parade was held in Law's honor in Boise, Idaho. There was also a "Vern Law Appreciation Dinner" that day, and Idaho Governor Robert E. Smylie proclaimed it "Vern Law Day in Idaho". Team owner Bing Crosby sent a message to be read to the crowd that day, "'Bless the deacon for me and tell him all walks are forgiven. Wish I could be there. Bing.'"

Law was known as a "control pitcher", who carefully studied opposing hitters and relied on a good sinker and changeup. He is 106th in Major League history in bases on balls per nine innings (2.0109) (through the 2025 season). He was an above-average hitting pitcher. He had a career lifetime batting average of .216, with 11 home runs, 35 doubles, 7 triples, 90 runs batted in (RBI), 96 runs scored, 191 hits, 41 bases on balls and a .563 OPS. He struck out 179 times in 1,003 plate appearances. He hit .344 in 1951 (32 at bats) and .311 in 1962 and 1964 (45 and 61 at bats respectively). In 1958, he had two home runs and 12 RBI; and five doubles and 13 RBI in 1954.

Law was known to his teammates to be a devout member of The Church of Jesus Christ of Latter-day Saints, and they nicknamed him “Deacon” and “Preacher”. Law's Pirates teammates respected him and his adherence to his religious beliefs. In the locker room, he was located near pitcher Bob Veale and catcher Del Crandall, who were more likeminded with Law in how they lived their lives than the rowdier players on the team. National League umpire Stan Landes once ejected Law from a game, while Law was sitting on the Pirates' bench. In his later reporting the basis for this ejection, Landes made clear it was not because Law was participating with his teammates in using abusive language toward Landes, but because Landes wanted to prevent Law from having to hear such language.

== Personal life ==
Law was made a Deacon in the Church of Jesus Christ of Latter-day Saints at the age of 12, became a teacher two years later and was ordained a priest at 17. He tithed 10% of his salary to the Church during his career. During his 1960 season, as an Elder in his Church Law addressed 3,500 people at the end of August in Oakland, California. During the offseasons, Law worked in banking. He became well known as a frequent public speaker nationally, without asking for speaking fees.

One of his five sons, Vance Law, also played in the Major Leagues for 11 seasons (mostly as an infielder), and coached baseball at Brigham Young University. Law coached under his son at BYU for a time. His grandson Adam Law played minor league baseball for the Los Angeles Dodgers and Seattle Mariners. Law's wife VaNita, with whom he had six children and numerous grandchildren, great-grandchildren and great-great-grandchildren, died in 2023; they had been married for 73 years.

== See also ==
- List of Major League Baseball players who spent their entire career with one franchise

Awards and achievements
Preceded by Don Drysdale; Joe Torre	Major League Player of the Month; August 1959 (with Willie McCovey); June 1965 (with Willie Stargell)	Succeeded by Eddie Mathews; Pete Rose
Sporting positions
Preceded by Clyde King	Pittsburgh Pirates pitching coach 1968–1969	Succeeded by Don Osborn
