= Norm Sherry =

American baseball player and manager (1931–2021)

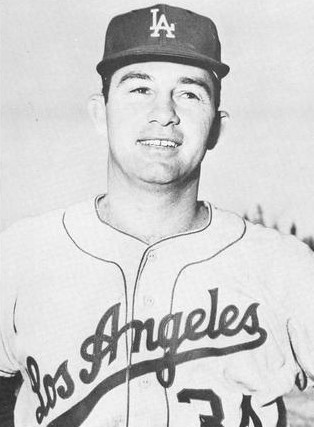
- Catcher / Manager / Coach
- Born: July 16, 1931; New York City, U.S.
- Died: March 8, 2021 (aged 89); San Juan Capistrano, California, U.S.
- Batted: Right Threw: Right

MLB debut
- April 12, 1959, for the Los Angeles Dodgers

Last MLB appearance
- September 26, 1963, for the New York Mets

MLB statistics
- Batting average: .215
- Home runs: 18
- Runs batted in: 69
- Managerial record: 76–71
- Winning %: .517
- Stats at Baseball Reference
- Managerial record at Baseball Reference

Teams
- As player: Los Angeles Dodgers (1959–1962); New York Mets (1963); As manager: California Angels (1976–1977); As coach: California Angels (1970–1971; 1976); Montreal Expos (1978–1981); San Diego Padres (1982–1984); San Francisco Giants (1986–1991)

Norman Burt Sherry (July 16, 1931 – March 8, 2021) was an American professional baseball catcher, manager, and coach who played five seasons in Major League Baseball (MLB). He played for the Los Angeles Dodgers and New York Mets from 1959 to 1963. Sherry went on to coach and manage the California Angels, and also served as coach of the Montreal Expos, San Diego Padres and San Francisco Giants.

Sherry was noted for helping future Hall of Fame pitcher Sandy Koufax with his pitching control, his advice during a spring training game in 1961 being one of reasons for Koufax turning around his career and becoming one of the most dominating pitchers in baseball history. Years later, he also mentored a young Gary Carter and helped him turn into a Hall of Fame catcher.

== Early life ==
Sherry was born in New York City on July 16, 1931. He was the second of four sons of Harry Scharaga Sherry and Mildred "Minnie" (Walman) Sherry. His father worked in the dry cleaning business, while his mother was employed as a seamstress and milliner. Both sides of the family were Jewish immigrants from Russia, and his maternal great-grandfather was a rabbi. The families escaped separately from antisemitic pogroms. Some of his relatives who settled in Europe were killed in the Holocaust. His paternal grandparents, Max and Sarah Scharaga, came to the United States in 1898, and around 1920 his father changed their surname to Sherry. The Sherry family moved to Los Angeles during the early 1930s.

Sherry attended Fairfax High School, graduating in 1950. He was initially intending to study at the University of Southern California, having been awarded a full baseball scholarship.

He was signed as an amateur free agent by the Brooklyn Dodgers before the 1950 season. His brother Larry Sherry also played in Major League Baseball (MLB). The two played together on the Los Angeles Dodgers from 1959 to 1962, and occasionally formed a battery, with Larry pitching and Norm catching.

== Professional career ==
A right-handed hitter who stood 5 feet 11 inches (1.80 m) tall and weighed 180 pounds (82 kg), Sherry spent seven years working his way up through the Dodger farm system. He spent another two years in military service with the US Army in the 4th Infantry Division.

By the time he reached the Dodgers, in 1959 for a two-game "cup of coffee," he was 28 years of age and the team had moved to his home city of Los Angeles. He made the team as second-string backstop (behind John Roseboro) from 1960 through 1962.

In 1961, Sherry's advice contributed to the career turnaround of future Hall of Fame pitcher Sandy Koufax, who was his during his time with the Dodgers. Before a B-squad game against the Minnesota Twins in Orlando, Florida, Sherry told Koufax: "If you get behind the hitters, don't try to throw so hard." Koufax had a tendency to lose control of his temper and throw hard when he got into trouble. The strategy worked initially before Koufax temporarily reverted to throwing hard and walked the bases loaded with no out in the fifth. Sherry reminded Koufax of their discussion, advising him to settle down and throw to his glove and to throw more breaking pitches. The advice worked; Koufax struck out the side and then went on to pitch seven no-hit innings.

As for Sherry, he batted .283 with eight home runs in a part-time role in 1960, a career high. His average then dropped to .256 (1961) and .182 (1962). The Dodgers sold Sherry's contract to the New York Mets on October 14, 1962. He batted only .136 in a career-high 63 games played (and 147 at-bats) in New York in 1963, and his major league playing career ended.

In his overall career, Sherry played in 194 games over parts of five seasons, batting .215 with 18 home runs, and .288 with runners in scoring position. He collected 107 total hits.

== Manager and coach ==
In 1965, Sherry began his managerial career in the Dodger organization, scouted for a year with the New York Yankees, and returned to managing in the California Angels' system in 1969. He coached for the Angels in 1970 and 1971 under skipper Lefty Phillips, and returned to the minor leagues to manage their Double-A and Triple-A affiliates from 1972 through 1975 before rejoining the California coaching staff for 1976 under Dick Williams. Williams had been extremely successful in his previous terms with the Boston Red Sox and Oakland Athletics, but his cold and hard-edged demeanor did not go over well with a losing Angels club. The Halos were 18 games under the .500 mark on July 23, 1976, when Williams was given his walking papers.

Sherry, named his replacement, salvaged the season somewhat with a 37–29 record as skipper. That winter, the Angels signed high-profile free agents such as Bobby Grich and Joe Rudi and expected to contend in the American League West in 1977. But the team struggled and was only 39–42 and in fifth place on July 11 when Sherry was released in favor of his third-base coach, Dave Garcia. The firing marked the end of his major league managing career, with a career ledger of 76 wins and 71 defeats (.517). Through 2018, he was one of nine Jewish managers in MLB history. The others were Gabe Kapler, Brad Ausmus, Jeff Newman, Lipman Pike, and Lefty Phillips. However, Sherry returned to the coaching ranks, ultimately as an "official" pitching coach, working with Williams with the Montreal Expos and San Diego Padres, and with another ex-Dodger, Roger Craig, with the San Francisco Giants.

Sherry's brothers, George and Larry Sherry, were pitchers in professional baseball. Larry had an 11-season MLB career as a relief pitcher and was the Most Valuable Player of the 1959 World Series; he was Norm's teammate from 1959 through 1962, and on May 7, 1960, they became the first Jewish brothers to be Major League Baseball batterymates.

== Later life ==
After retiring from baseball, Sherry returned to San Diego. He underwent open heart surgery in November 1978, and had a heart attack less than three years later in March 1981. He was inducted into the Southern California Jewish Sports Hall of Fame in 1994.

Sherry addressed the San Diego Jewish Film Festival as a guest speaker when it screened Jews and Baseball: An American Love Story in February 2011. He often went to Padres games, and was present in 2014 for the 30th anniversary celebration of the team's first championship.

Sherry died on March 8, 2021, at an assisted living facility in San Juan Capistrano, California. He was 89, and died of natural causes.

== See also ==
- List of Jewish Major League Baseball players

Sporting positions
Preceded by Chuck Estrada	San Diego Padres pitching coach 1982–1984	Succeeded by Galen Cisco
Preceded by Bob Miller	San Francisco Giants pitching coach 1986–1992	Succeeded by Carlos Alfonso
