= 1960 Major League Baseball All-Star Game (first game) =

1960 American baseball competition

	1	2	3	4	5	6	7	8	9	R	H	E
National League	3	1	1	0	0	0	0	0	0	5	12	4
American League	0	0	0	0	0	1	0	2	0	3	6	1
- Date: July 11, 1960
- Venue: Municipal Stadium
- City: Kansas City, Missouri
- Managers: Walt Alston (LAD); Al López (CWS)
- Attendance: 30,619
- Television: NBC
- TV announcers: Curt Gowdy and Russ Hodges
- Radio: NBC
- Radio announcers: Merle Harmon and Jack Quinlan

The 1960 Major League Baseball All-Star Game was the 28th playing of the midsummer classic between the all-stars of the American League (AL) and National League (NL), the two leagues comprising Major League Baseball. The game was held on July 11, 1960, at Municipal Stadium in Kansas City, Missouri, the home of the Kansas City Athletics of the American League. The game resulted in the National League defeating the American League 5–3.

A second all-star game was played two days later on July 13 at Yankee Stadium in New York City.

== Rosters ==
Players in italics have since been inducted into the National Baseball Hall of Fame.

=== American League ===
Starters
Position	Player	Team	All-Star Games
P	Bill Monbouquette	Red Sox	1
C	Yogi Berra	Yankees	14
1B	Bill Skowron	Yankees	4
2B	Pete Runnels	Red Sox	3
3B	Frank Malzone	Red Sox	5
SS	Ron Hansen	Orioles	1
OF	Mickey Mantle	Yankees	10
OF	Roger Maris	Yankees	2
OF	Minnie Miñoso	White Sox	8

Pitchers
Position	Player	Team	All-Star Games
P	Gary Bell	Indians	1
P	Jim Coates	Yankees	1
P	Bud Daley	Athletics	3
P	Chuck Estrada	Orioles	1
P	Whitey Ford	Yankees	6
P	Frank Lary	Tigers	1
P	Camilo Pascual-x	Senators	2
P	Gerry Staley	White Sox	3
P	Dick Stigman	Indians	1
P	Early Wynn	White Sox	8

Reserves
Position	Player	Team	All-Star Games
C	Elston Howard	Yankees	4
C	Sherm Lollar	White Sox	8
1B	Jim Gentile	Orioles	1
1B	Vic Power	Indians	5
2B	Nellie Fox	White Sox	11
3B	Brooks Robinson	Orioles	1
SS	Luis Aparicio	White Sox	4
OF	Al Kaline	Tigers	7
OF	Harvey Kuenn	Indians	9
OF	Jim Lemon-y	Senators	1
OF	Al Smith	White Sox	2
OF	Ted Williams	Red Sox	18

=== National League ===
Starters
Position	Player	Team	All-Star Games
P	Bob Friend	Pirates	3
C	Del Crandall	Braves	8
1B	Joe Adcock	Braves	1
2B	Bill Mazeroski	Pirates	4
3B	Eddie Mathews	Braves	8
SS	Ernie Banks	Cubs	7
OF	Hank Aaron	Braves	7
OF	Willie Mays	Giants	8
OF	Bob Skinner	Pirates	2

Pitchers
Position	Player	Team	All-Star Games
P	Bob Buhl	Braves	1
P	Roy Face	Pirates	3
P	Bill Henry	Reds	1
P	Larry Jackson	Cardinals	3
P	Vern Law	Pirates	1
P	Mike McCormick	Giants	1
P	Lindy McDaniel	Cardinals	1
P	Johnny Podres	Dodgers	2
P	Stan Williams	Dodgers	1

Reserves
Position	Player	Team	All-Star Games
C	Ed Bailey	Reds	3
C	Smoky Burgess	Pirates	5
1B	Norm Larker	Dodgers	1
1B	Bill White	Cardinals	2
2B	Charlie Neal	Dodgers	2
2B	Tony Taylor	Phillies	1
3B	Ken Boyer	Cardinals	4
SS	Dick Groat	Pirates	3
OF	Orlando Cepeda	Giants	3
OF	Roberto Clemente	Pirates	1
OF	Stan Musial	Cardinals	18
OF	Vada Pinson	Reds	3

  - -x – Injured and could not play
  - -y – Injury replacement

== Game ==
Umpires: Jim Honochick, Home Plate (AL); Tom Gorman, First Base (NL); Nestor Chylak, Second Base (AL); Dusty Boggess, Third Base (NL); Johnny Stevens, Left Field (AL); Vinnie Smith, Right Field (NL)

=== Starting lineups ===
American League				National League			
Order	Player	Team	Position	Order	Player	Team	Position
1	Minnie Miñoso	White Sox	LF	1	Willie Mays	Giants	CF
2	Frank Malzone	Red Sox	3B	2	Bob Skinner	Pirates	LF
3	Roger Maris	Yankees	RF	3	Eddie Mathews	Braves	3B
4	Mickey Mantle	Yankees	CF	4	Hank Aaron	Braves	RF
5	Bill Skowron	Yankees	1B	5	Ernie Banks	Cubs	SS
6	Yogi Berra	Yankees	C	6	Joe Adcock	Braves	1B
7	Pete Runnels	Red Sox	2B	7	Bill Mazeroski	Pirates	2B
8	Ron Hansen	Orioles	SS	8	Del Crandall	Braves	C
9	Bill Monbouquette	Red Sox	P	9	Bob Friend	Pirates	P

=== Game summary ===
Monday, July 11, 1960 2:00 pm (CT) at Municipal Stadium in Kansas City, Missouri
Team	1	2	3	4	5	6	7	8	9	R	H	E
National League	3	1	1	0	0	0	0	0	0	5	12	4
American League	0	0	0	0	0	1	0	2	0	3	6	1
WP: Bob Friend (1–0) LP: Bill Monbouquette (0–1); Home runs: NL: Ernie Banks (1), Del Crandall (1); AL: Al Kaline (1)
