= Jack Quinlan =

American sports announcer (1927-1965)

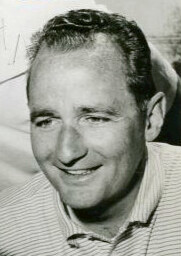
- Quinlan in 1958.
- Born: John Charles Quinlan; January 23, 1927; Peoria, Illinois, U.S.
- Died: March 19, 1965 (aged 38); Scottsdale, Arizona, U.S.
- Sports commentary career
- Team: Chicago Cubs (1955–64)
- Genre: Play-by-play
- Sport: Major League Baseball

John Charles Quinlan (January 23, 1927 – March 19, 1965) was an American sportscaster. He was best known for doing radio play-by-play for the Chicago Cubs, first on WIND (1955–56) and then on WGN (1957–64). His broadcast partners were Lou Boudreau (1957–April 1960, 1961–64) and Charlie Grimm April–October 1960).

Quinlan was killed in an auto accident after leaving a golf outing during spring training of 1965. He was an avid golfer, and a charity golf tournament in his name has been held in the Chicago area ever since.

Quinlan's classic call of the final out of Don Cardwell's no-hitter on May 15, 1960, transcribed from a phonograph record of Cubs history issued in 1971, is quoted below. The batter for the opposing St. Louis Cardinals is Joe Cunningham. The Cubs left fielder is Walt "Moose" Moryn. (See also Jack Brickhouse for TV-vs.-radio style comparison.)

Ball 3, strike 1 on Cunningham... Here's the pitch... Strike 2! (Wrigley Field crowd roars) ... Cunningham's arguing now... he's back here barkin' at Tony Venzon, the plate umpire... he's really sore... he is really peeved at that strike two, that was called... One more pitch could end it... You know what kind of a pitch we're hopin' for: The dark one! Blow it past him Don! ... Here comes the biggest pitch of this ballgame... Lined into left field... (crowd gasps) ... Here's Moryn comin' ... (crowd roars) ... HE CAUGHT IT! He caught it! A no-hitter! A no-hitter for Cardwell! Moryn made a great game-saving catch! It's a no-hitter for Cardwell... his teammates are mobbin' him... Cardwell's teammates are poundin' him to death!

Quinlan was named Illinois Sportscaster of the Year by the National Sportscasters and Sportswriters Association four straight years from 1961 to 1964. Nationally, he broadcast the first 1960 All-Star Game and the 1960 World Series for NBC Radio. He also called Big Ten football on WGN and broadcast the 1963 NFL Championship Game locally as a substitute for regular Bears radio announcer Brickhouse, who was calling the game on NBC television.
