= 1959 Major League Baseball All-Star Game =

1959 Major League Baseball All-Star Game may refer to:

- The 1959 Major League Baseball All-Star Game (first game), a 5–4 victory for the National League over the American League, which was played in Pittsburgh.
- The 1959 Major League Baseball All-Star Game (second game), a 5–3 victory for the American League over the National League, which was played in Los Angeles.
