= Larry Sherry =

American baseball player (1935–2006)

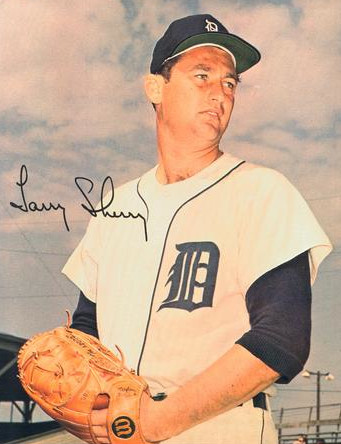
- Pitcher
- Born: July 25, 1935; Los Angeles, California, U.S.
- Died: December 17, 2006 (aged 71); Mission Viejo, California, U.S.
- Batted: Right Threw: Right

MLB debut
- April 17, 1958, for the Los Angeles Dodgers

Last MLB appearance
- July 7, 1968, for the California Angels

MLB statistics
- Win–loss record: 53–44
- Earned run average: 3.67
- Strikeouts: 606
- Saves: 82
- Stats at Baseball Reference

Teams
- Los Angeles Dodgers (1958–1963); Detroit Tigers (1964–1967); Houston Astros (1967); California Angels (1968)

Career highlights and awards
- World Series champion (1959); World Series MVP (1959)

Lawrence Sherry (July 25, 1935 – December 17, 2006) was an American professional baseball player and coach. He played in Major League Baseball (MLB) as a right-handed relief pitcher from 1958 to 1968, most prominently as a member of the Los Angeles Dodgers and Detroit Tigers. He was named the Most Valuable Player of the 1959 World Series as the Dodgers won their first championship since relocating from Brooklyn just two years earlier. After his playing career, Sherry managed in the minor leagues before serving as a major league coach for the Pittsburgh Pirates and the California Angels.

== Early life ==
Sherry was born into a Jewish family in Los Angeles, California. His parents, Harry Scharaga Sherry and Mildred "Minnie" (Walman) Sherry, were children of Russian Jewish immigrants who escaped separately from antisemitic pogroms. Some of his relatives who settled in Europe were killed in the Holocaust. His paternal grandparents, Max and Sarah Scharaga, came to the United States in 1898, and around 1920, his father changed their surname to Sherry.

Larry was born with clubfeet, for which he needed surgery as an infant and wore special shoes. He attended Fairfax High School in Los Angeles. His brother Norm Sherry also played in Major League Baseball (MLB). The two played together on the Los Angeles Dodgers from 1959 to 1962, and occasionally formed a battery, with Larry pitching and Norm catching.

== Baseball career ==
From Los Angeles, Sherry made his debut with his hometown Dodgers on April 17, 1958 – just their third game after moving west. Adding to the pressure, the game was played on the road against their hated rivals, the San Francisco Giants, who had also relocated from New York City. Sherry had a brief outing, facing four batters without recording an out, and appeared in only four more games all year.

But he returned with a solid season in 1959, winning 7 games with only two losses, with an earned run average of 2.19. He was named MVP of the 1959 World Series, in which the Dodgers defeated the Chicago White Sox in 6 games, and also received the Babe Ruth Award. Sherry completed all four Dodger victories during the Series, winning two of them and saving the two others, and had a 0.71 ERA in 12 2/3 innings.

In 1960 he won a career-high 14 games, finished 38 games (4th in the league), pitched in 57 games (6th in the league), and even received support for MVP, coming in 20th in the voting.

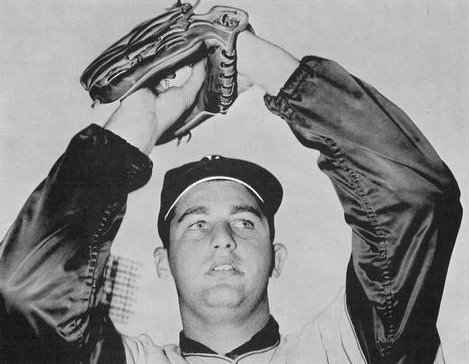
Sherry in 1961

In 1961 he was 5th in the NL in saves (15) and games finished (34), and 9th in games pitched (53). In 1962 he was 7th in saves (11) and games pitched (58).

He was traded to the Tigers for Lou Johnson and cash just before the 1964 season, and spent three and a half years with his new club, earning a career-best 20 saves in 1966, 3rd-best in the AL.

He was traded to the Houston Astros for Jim Landis for the second half of the 1967 season, and ended his career with three games for the California Angels in 1968.

Sherry retired with a record of 53–44, 606 strikeouts, 82 saves and a 3.67 ERA in 416 games and 799 1/3 innings.

Through 2010, he was 5th all-time in career games (directly behind Dave Roberts), 8th in strikeouts (directly behind Barney Pelty), and 9th in wins (directly behind Barry Latman) among Jewish major league baseball players.

== Coaching career ==
After his pitching career, Sherry managed in the farm systems of the White Sox (1970–1972) and Pittsburgh Pirates and coached in the Dodgers' minor league organization. He was the Pirates' MLB pitching coach in 1977 and 1978, then held the same post with the California Angels in 1979 and 1980.

== Accolades ==
In 1993 Sherry was inducted into the Southern California Jewish Sports Hall of Fame. Sherry marketed a popular 'Larry Sherry Pitch Back' in the early 1960's that returned a pitched ball.

== Death ==
On December 17, 2006, Sherry died at his home in Mission Viejo, California, after a long battle with cancer.

== See also ==
- List of Jewish Major League Baseball players

Sporting positions
Preceded by Don Osborn	Pittsburgh Pirates pitching coach 1977–1978	Succeeded by Harvey Haddix
Preceded by Marv Grissom	California Angels pitching coach 1979–1980	Succeeded by Tom Morgan
