= Gerry Staley =

American baseball player (1920–2008)

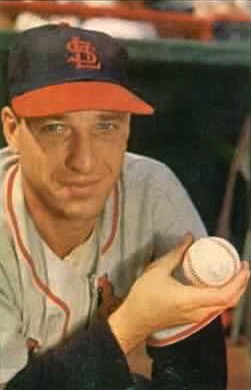
- Staley, c. 1953
- Pitcher
- Born: August 21, 1920; Brush Prairie, Washington, U.S.
- Died: January 2, 2008 (aged 87); Vancouver, Washington, U.S.
- Batted: Right Threw: Right

MLB debut
- April 20, 1947, for the St. Louis Cardinals

Last MLB appearance
- September 25, 1961, for the Detroit Tigers

MLB statistics
- Win–loss record: 134–111
- Earned run average: 3.70
- Strikeouts: 727
- Saves: 61
- Stats at Baseball Reference

Teams
- St. Louis Cardinals (1947–1954); Cincinnati Redlegs (1955); New York Yankees (1955–1956); Chicago White Sox (1956–1961); Kansas City Athletics (1961); Detroit Tigers (1961)

Career highlights and awards
- 4× All-Star (1952, 1953, 1960, 1960²)

Gerald Lee Staley (August 21, 1920 – January 2, 2008) was an American right-handed pitcher in Major League Baseball. He was drafted by the St. Louis Cardinals in the 1942 Minor League draft. He pitched regularly from 1947 on, then was traded to Cincinnati for the 1955 season. In 1955 and 1956, he pitched for three teams, including the Yankees, before ending up with the Chicago White Sox, whom he helped to the 1959 American League pennant as a reliever.

Staley was named to the 1952 and 1953 National League All-Star teams and the 1960 American League All-Star team. He finished 28th in voting for the AL's 1959 Most Valuable Player Award after leading the league in games with 67 and games finished with 37, and had an 8–5 record, 14 saves in 116 1/3 innings, 54 strikeouts, and a 2.24 earned run average.

He finished 23rd in voting for the 1960 Most Valuable Player Award for having a 13–8 record in 64 games and 115 1/3 innings, with 10 saves, 14 blown saves, 52 strikeouts and a 2.42 earned run average. The 14 blown saves was a single-season record, matched by only four other pitchers.

He led the National League in hits allowed per 9 innings pitched (8.09) in 1949, and led the National League in hit batsmen in 1952 (7) and 1953 (17).

In 15 years, he had a 134–111 record in 640 games, 186 games started, 58 complete games, 9 shutouts, 246 games finished, 61 saves, 1,981 2/3 innings, 2,070 hits allowed, 946 runs allowed (814 earned), 187 home runs allowed, 529 walks (37 intentional), 727 strikeouts, 63 hit batsmen, 27 wild pitches, 8,398 batters faced, 2 balks and a 3.70 earned run average.

He died at his home in Vancouver, Washington, of natural causes at the age of 87.
