= Johnny Podres =

American baseball player (1932–2008)

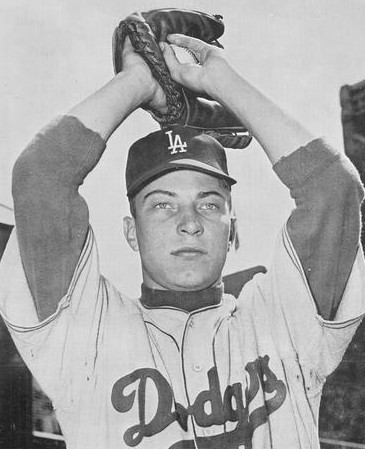
- Podres with the Los Angeles Dodgers in 1961
- Pitcher
- Born: September 30, 1932; Witherbee, New York, U.S.
- Died: January 13, 2008 (aged 75); Glens Falls, New York, U.S.
- Batted: Left Threw: Left

MLB debut
- April 7, 1953, for the Brooklyn Dodgers

Last MLB appearance
- June 21, 1969, for the San Diego Padres

MLB statistics
- Win–loss record: 148–116
- Earned run average: 3.68
- Strikeouts: 1,435
- Stats at Baseball Reference

Teams
- Brooklyn / Los Angeles Dodgers (1953–1966); Detroit Tigers (1966–1967); San Diego Padres (1969)

Career highlights and awards
- 4× All-Star (1958, 1960, 1960², 1962²); 4× World Series champion (1955, 1959, 1963, 1965); World Series MVP (1955); NL ERA leader (1957)

John Joseph Podres (/ˈpɑːdreɪz/ PAH-drayz; September 30, 1932 – January 13, 2008) was an American left-handed pitcher in Major League Baseball (MLB). He played in the majors from 1953 to 1969, spending most of his career with the Brooklyn/Los Angeles Dodgers. Podres won four World Series titles with the Dodgers. He is best known for pitching a shutout in game 7 of the 1955 World Series to give the Dodgers their first championship.

== Professional baseball career ==
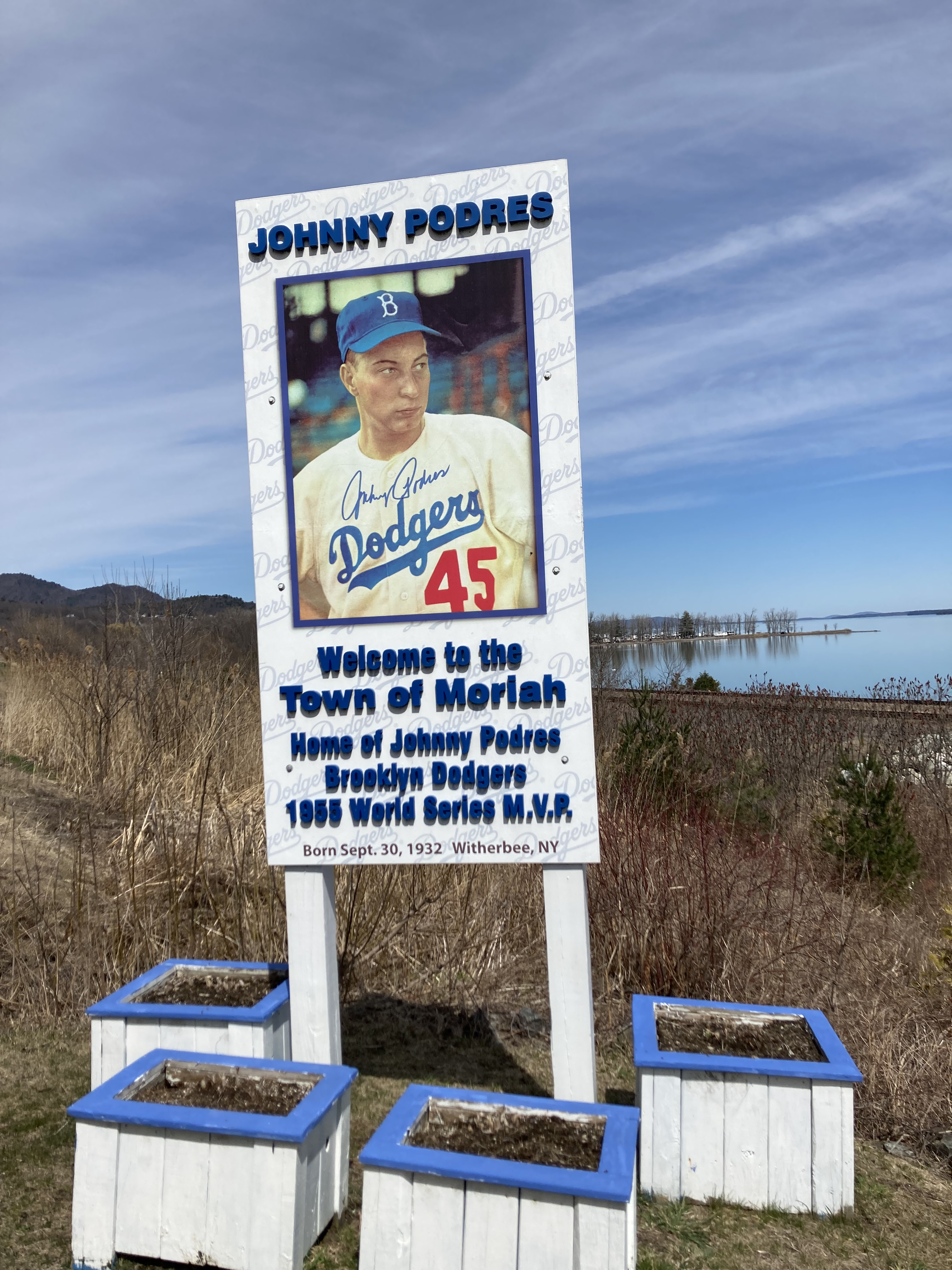
Monument to the birthplace of the baseball player Johnny Podres

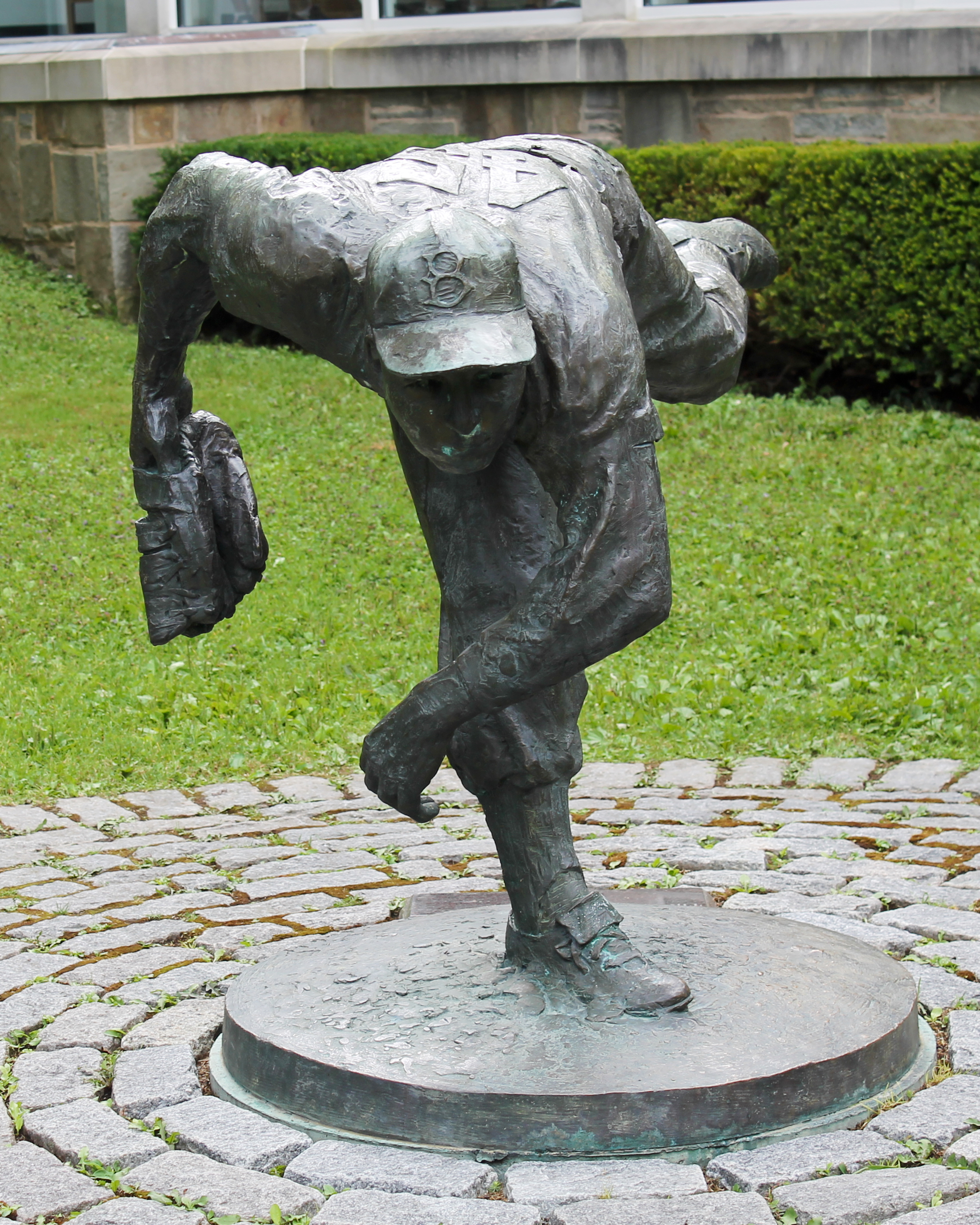
Bronze sculpture of Podres at the Baseball Hall of Fame

Podres was born in Witherbee, New York, in 1932. He was of Lithuanian–Polish descent.

Podres was signed by the Brooklyn Dodgers as an amateur free agent before the 1951 season. He started his professional baseball career that year with the Hazard Bombers of the Mountain States League. With the Bombers, he had a 21–9 win–loss record and a 1.67 earned run average (ERA), leading the league in wins and ERA.

After spending one more season in the minors in 1952, Podres made his major league debut with the Dodgers in 1953. He went 9–4 and helped the Dodgers win the National League (NL) championship. In the 1953 World Series, he made one start, taking the loss, and the Dodgers lost the series. Podres then went 11–7 in 1954.

In 1955, Podres went 9–10, and the Dodgers won the NL pennant. After the Dodgers lost the first two games of the 1955 World Series to the New York Yankees, Podres pitched a complete game, seven-hit victory on his 23rd birthday in game 3. The series went to a deciding seventh game, with Podres getting the start. Considered one of the most unlikely game 7 starters in World Series history because of his regular season record, Podres pitched a 2–0 shutout to help the Dodgers win their first and only World Series title in Brooklyn. For his performance in the World Series, he was given the first-ever World Series Most Valuable Player Award and was presented with a red two-seater Corvette. He also won the Babe Ruth Award and was later named the Sportsman of the Year by Sports Illustrated.

Podres was out of baseball in 1956 due to military service. He returned to the Dodgers in 1957 and had his best season, going 12–9 and leading the NL with a 2.66 ERA, 155 ERA+, 1.082 WHIP, and six shutouts.

In 1958, after the Dodgers moved to Los Angeles, Podres went 13–15 and was an All-Star for the first time. In 1959, he went 14–9, helping the Dodgers win the NL. He made two starts in the 1959 World Series, going 1–0, and the Dodgers won the series.

In 1960, Podres went 14–12 and made both of the All-Star teams that year. In 1961, he went 18–5, setting his major league career-high in wins.

In 1962, Podres went 15–13 and was an All-Star for the fourth and final time. In 1963, he went 14–12, and the Dodgers won the NL. He made one start in the 1963 World Series, winning it, and the Dodgers won the series. From 1957 to 1963, Podres pitched over 180 innings and won over 10 games every year.

Podres' play then started to decline. He went 0–2 in limited action in 1964. In 1965, he went 7–6, and the Dodgers won the NL. Podres did not play in the 1965 World Series, which the Dodgers won.

In 1966, the Dodgers traded Podres to the Detroit Tigers, for whom he played through the 1967 season. He spent 1968 in the minors and then came back for one season with the San Diego Padres in 1969 before retiring as a player.

In his 15-year MLB career, Podres had a 148–116 record, a 3.68 ERA, 1,435 strikeouts, and a 105 ERA+. He was at his best in the World Series; in four World Series, he went 4–1 with a 2.11 ERA and 18 strikeouts. As a hitter, Podres had a .190 career regular season batting average and a .313 batting average in the World Series.

== Later life ==
After his playing career ended, Podres served as the pitching coach for the Padres, Boston Red Sox, Minnesota Twins, and Philadelphia Phillies for 23 seasons between 1973 and 1996. Among the pitchers he worked with were Frank Viola and Curt Schilling.

In 2002, Podres was inducted into the National Polish-American Sports Hall of Fame.

Podres later settled in Queensbury, New York. He died in Glens Falls, New York, in 2008 at age 75 after being hospitalized for heart and kidney ailments and a leg infection. Podres was survived by his wife of 41 years, the former Joni Taylor of Ice Follies fame, and his two sons, Joe and John Jr. He is interred at St. Peter and Paul Cemetery in Moriah, New York, which is in the Adirondack Park.

== See also ==
- List of Major League Baseball annual ERA leaders
- List of Major League Baseball annual shutout leaders
- Los Angeles Dodgers all-time roster

Awards and achievements
Preceded by Don Drysdale	Los Angeles Dodgers' Opening Day starting pitcher 1962	Succeeded by Don Drysdale
Sporting positions
Preceded by Roger Craig	San Diego Padres pitching coach 1973	Succeeded by Bill Posedel
Preceded by Al Jackson	Boston Red Sox pitching coach 1980	Succeeded by Lee Stange
Preceded by Camilo Pascual	Minnesota Twins pitching coach 1981–1985	Succeeded by Dick Such
Preceded by Darold Knowles	Philadelphia Phillies pitching coach 1991–1996	Succeeded by Galen Cisco
