= Joe Adcock =

American baseball player and manager (1927–1999)

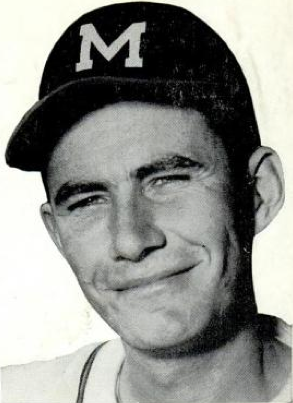
- Adcock in 1954 with the Milwaukee Braves
- First baseman / Outfielder / Manager
- Born: October 30, 1927; Coushatta, Louisiana, U.S.
- Died: May 3, 1999 (aged 71); Coushatta, Louisiana, U.S.
- Batted: Right Threw: Right

MLB debut
- April 23, 1950, for the Cincinnati Reds

Last MLB appearance
- October 1, 1966, for the California Angels

MLB statistics
- Batting average: .277
- Home runs: 336
- Runs batted in: 1,122
- Managerial record: 75–87
- Winning %: .463
- Stats at Baseball Reference

Teams
- As player: Cincinnati Reds (1950–1952); Milwaukee Braves (1953–1962); Cleveland Indians (1963); Los Angeles / California Angels (1964–1966); As manager: Cleveland Indians (1967)

Career highlights and awards
- 2× All-Star (1960, 1960²); World Series champion (1957); Hit four home runs in one game on July 31, 1954; Braves Hall of Fame; American Family Field Walk of Fame

Joseph Wilbur Adcock (October 30, 1927 – May 3, 1999) was an American professional baseball player and manager. He played in Major League Baseball as a first baseman from 1950 to 1966, most prominently as a member of the Milwaukee Braves teams that won two consecutive National League pennants and the 1957 World Series.

A two-time All-Star player, Adcock was known for his long distance home runs, including hitting four in one game in 1954. Adcock ranks third in Milwaukee Braves history in hits, home runs, runs batted in and total bases. A sure-handed defensive player, at the time of his retirement in 1966, he had the third-highest career fielding percentage by a major league first baseman (.994). During his major league tenure, he also played for the Cincinnati Reds, Cleveland Indians and the Los Angeles / California Angels.

His nickname "Billy Joe" derived from Vanderbilt University basketball star "Billy Joe Adcock" and was popularized by Vin Scully. Adcock was inducted into the Braves Hall of Fame in 2022.

== Early life ==
Adcock was born in Coushatta, Louisiana. He attended Louisiana State University in Baton Rouge, playing on its ballclub as the first organized baseball of his life.

== Baseball career ==
=== As player ===
He was signed by the Cincinnati Reds; however, All-Star slugger Ted Kluszewski had a firm hold on the team's first base slot. Adcock played in left field from 1950 to 1952, but was extremely unhappy, demanding a trade, which he received.

His first season with the Milwaukee Braves was capped by a mammoth home run into the center-field bleachers at the Polo Grounds on April 29, 1953, a feat which had never been done before in an official MLB game and would only be accomplished twice more, by Hank Aaron and Lou Brock. Actually, on July 18, 1948, Luke Easter of the Homestead Grays of the Negro Leagues was the first player ever to hit a home run into the center field bleachers at the Polo Grounds. Easter would join the Cleveland Indians in 1949.

On July 31, 1954, Adcock became only the seventh player in Major League Baseball history to hit four home runs in a game. He did so against the Brooklyn Dodgers at their home ballpark, Ebbets Field, also hitting a double off the top of the wall to set a record for most total bases in a game (18) which stood for 48 years, until broken on May 23, 2002 by Shawn Green. whose record was tied by Nick Kurtz on July 25, 2025. Of note, the four home runs were hit off four different Dodger pitchers.

Another notable home run ended the epic duel between Lew Burdette and Harvey Haddix on May 26, 1959, in which Haddix took a perfect game into the 13th inning. Adcock did not get credit for a home run, however, because Aaron – who was on first base – saw Félix Mantilla, the runner ahead of him, score the winning run and thought the hit had only been a double and walked back to the dugout, causing Adcock to be called out for passing him on the base paths. (Eventually, the ruling was that instead of a 3-run home run for a 3–0 Braves victory, Adcock got a double and 1 RBI, and the Braves won 1–0.)

Adcock was often overshadowed both by his own teammates, future baseball Hall of Famers Aaron and Eddie Mathews, and by the other slugging first basemen in the league, Kluszewski and Gil Hodges, although he did make one All-Star team (1960) and was regularly among the league leaders in home runs. In 1956, he finished second in the National League in home runs, runs batted in, and slugging average.

As a pinch-hitter, Adcock was a threat, hitting 12 home runs with 37 RBI and batting .267 (40-for-150) in his MLB career, including 3 homers and 10 RBI in a pinch-hitting role in his last season with the 1966 California Angels.

=== Career statistics ===
Years	G	AB	R	H	2B	3B	HR	RBI	BB	AVG	OBP	SLG	OPS	FLD%
17	1,959	6,606	823	1,832	295	35	336	1,122	594	.277	.337	.485	.822	.993

=== As manager ===
After concluding his playing career with the Cleveland Indians (1963) and Los Angeles/California Angels (1964–1966), Adcock managed the Indians for one year (1967), with the team registering its worst percentage finish in 21 years (.463, vs. .442 in 1946), finishing eighth in a ten-team league. Following the season he was replaced as Cleveland manager by Alvin Dark. Adcock managed two more years in the minor leagues before settling down at his 288-acre (1.2 km^{2}) ranch in Coushatta, Louisiana, to raise horses.

==== Managerial record ====
Team	Year	Regular season					Postseason			
Team	Year	Games	Won	Lost	Win %	Finish	Won	Lost	Win %	Result
CLE	1967	162	75	87	.463	8th in AL	–	–	–	–
Total		162	75	87	.463		0	0	–	

== Death ==
He later died in Coushatta, Louisiana, at age 71 in 1999 as a result of Alzheimer's disease. He is buried in Social Springs cemetery in Red River parish, 15 miles (24 km) from Coushatta.

== See also ==
- List of Major League Baseball career home run leaders
- List of Major League Baseball career runs batted in leaders
- List of Major League Baseball single-game home run leaders

Awards and achievements
Preceded by Gil Hodges	Batters with 4 home runs in one game July 31, 1954	Succeeded by Rocky Colavito
