= List of Major League Baseball attendance records =

H

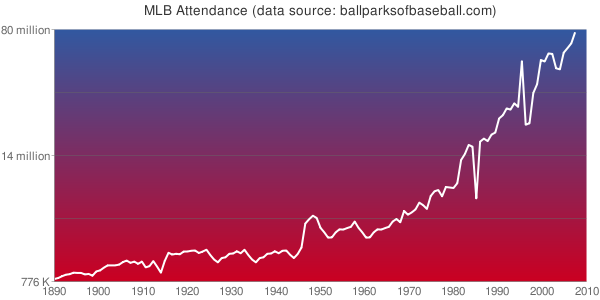
Attendance for all teams 1890–2008 (updated)

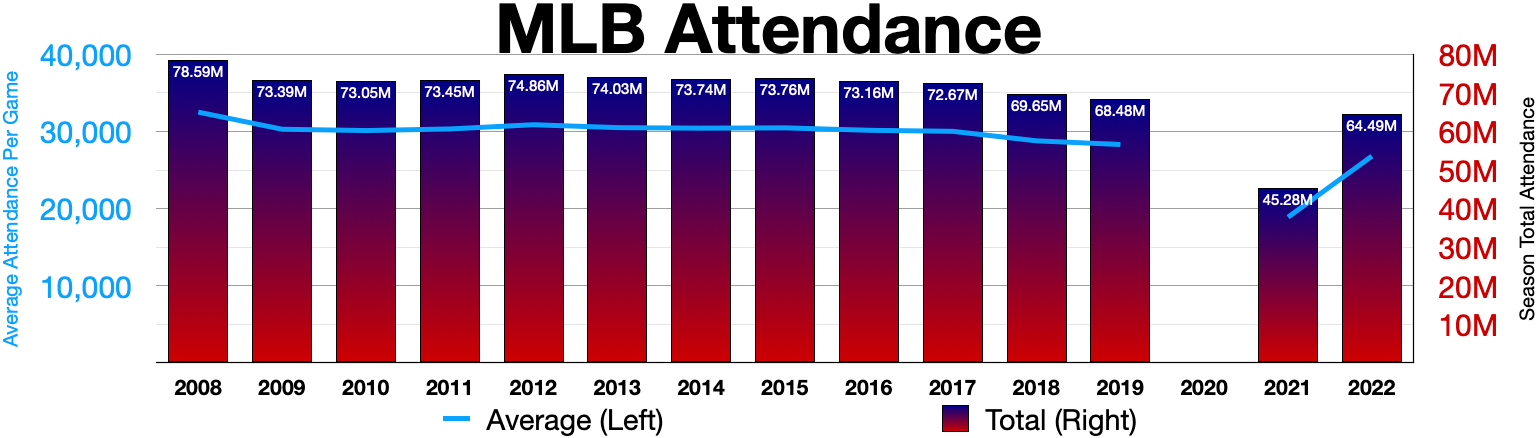
MLB attendance 2008-2022 Total attendance for the season (right) Average attendance per game (left)

== Most attended game in history ==
The all-time attendance record of 115,300 was set at a preseason game between the defending champions Boston Red Sox and Los Angeles Dodgers on March 29, 2008, at the Los Angeles Memorial Coliseum. According to the National Baseball Hall of Fame, this is the only baseball game where the 100,000 figure has been definitively exceeded. (Note: Other games thought to have exceeded 100,000 spectators include two amateur games at Cleveland's Brookside Park, on September 20, 1914 and October 12, 1915, and two exhibition games at the 1936 and 1956 Summer Olympics. However, none of the four claims are considered provable or definitively supported by hard evidence.)

== Least attended game in history ==
The record was set on September 28, 1882, in game between the Troy Trojans and the Worcesters in Worcester, Massachusetts, which some reports had only six spectators attend. As both clubs had been notified that they were being dropped from the National League, fans had very little interest in watching the lame-duck teams, especially on a day which the Boston Globe described as "bleak, cold and windy".

This record does not count games played behind closed doors by governmental authority. Games that were played as such included the April 29, 2015 game between the Baltimore Orioles and the Chicago White Sox at Oriole Park at Camden Yards, which was closed because of safety concerns surrounding the 2015 Baltimore protests, and the majority of the 2020 season (only the NLCS and World Series had spectators) which was closed to fans due to the COVID-19 pandemic in 2020.

== Highest and lowest season home totals, by team ==
The following shows the highest and lowest season home totals by team since 1903, excluding the 1918, 1981, 2020, and 2021 seasons.

Team name	Season	Highest attendance	Per game average	Ballpark	Season	Lowest attendance	Per game average	Ballpark
Arizona Diamondbacks	1998	3,610,290	44,571	Bank One Ballpark	2016	2,036,216	25,138	Chase Field
Athletics	1990	2,900,217	35,805	Oakland Coliseum	1915	146,223	1,976	Shibe Park
Atlanta Braves	1993	3,884,720	47,960	Atlanta–Fulton County Stadium	1911	116,000	1,547	South End Grounds III
Baltimore Orioles	1997	3,711,132	45,816	Oriole Park at Camden Yards	1935	80,922	1,065	Sportsman's Park III
Boston Red Sox	2009	3,062,699	37,811	Fenway Park	1932	182,150	2,366	Fenway Park and Braves Field
Chicago Cubs	2008	3,300,200	40,743	Wrigley Field	1914	202,516	2,665	West Side Grounds
Chicago White Sox	2006	2,957,414	36,511	U.S. Cellular Field	1932	233,198	3,029	Comiskey Park I
Cincinnati Reds	1976	2,629,708	32,466	Riverfront Stadium	1914	100,791	1,309	Redland Field
Cleveland Guardians	1999	3,468,456	42,820	Jacobs Field	1915	159,285	2,069	League Park II
Colorado Rockies	1993	4,483,350	55,350	Mile High Stadium	2005	1,914,389	23,634	Coors Field
Detroit Tigers	2008	3,202,645	39,539	Comerica Park	1906	174,043	2,231	Bennett Park
Houston Astros	2004	3,087,872	38,122	Minute Maid Park	1963	719,502	8,883	Colt Stadium
Kansas City Royals	2015	2,708,549	33,439	Kauffman Stadium	1970	693,047	8,773	Municipal Stadium
Los Angeles Angels	2006	3,406,790	42,059	Angel Stadium of Anaheim	1965	566,727	7,064	Dodger Stadium
Los Angeles Dodgers	2026	4,034,219	49,805	Dodger Stadium	1914	122,671	1,553	Ebbets Field
Miami Marlins	1993	3,064,847	37,838	Joe Robbie Stadium	2018	811,104	10,014	Marlins Park
Milwaukee Brewers	2011	3,071,373	37,918	Miller Park	1972	600,440	7,601	County Stadium
Minnesota Twins	2010	3,223,640	39,798	Target Field	1903	128,878	1,815	American League Park I
New York Mets	2008	4,042,045	49,902	Shea Stadium	1979	788,905	9,621	Shea Stadium
New York Yankees	2008	4,298,655	53,070	Yankee Stadium	1903	211,808	3,161	Hilltop Park
Philadelphia Phillies	2011	3,680,718	45,440	Citizens Bank Park	1914	138,474	1,775	Baker Bowl
Pittsburgh Pirates	2015	2,498,596	30,847	PNC Park	1914	139,620	1,813	Forbes Field
Seattle Mariners	2002	3,542,938	43,740	Safeco Field	1983	813,537	10,044	Kingdome
St. Louis Cardinals	2007	3,552,180	43,854	Busch Stadium	1919	167,059	2,421	Robison Field
San Diego Padres	2025	3,437,201	42,434	Petco Park	1969	512,970	6,333	San Diego Stadium
San Francisco Giants	2011	3,387,303	41,819	AT&T Park	1914	364,313	4,554	Polo Grounds V
Tampa Bay Rays	1998	2,506,293	30,942	Tropicana Field	2025	786,750	9,713	George M. Steinbrenner Field
Texas Rangers	2012	3,460,280	42,720	The Ballpark in Arlington	1963	535,604	6,695	D.C. Stadium
Toronto Blue Jays	1993	4,057,947	50,098	SkyDome	1982	1,275,978	15,753	Exhibition Stadium
Washington Nationals	2005	2,731,993	33,728	R.F.K. Stadium	2001	642,745	7,935	Olympic Stadium

The highest per game attendance average is held by the Colorado Rockies in 1994 with 57,570 for 57 home games at Mile High Stadium during the strike shortened season.

The 1918 season is excluded as it was shortened due to travel restrictions caused by World War I.

The 1981 season is excluded due to the players' strike that cancelled almost two months' worth of games.

The 2020 and 2021 seasons are excluded due to the COVID-19 pandemic that caused restrictions on public gatherings.

== 4 million or more home attendance totals ==
Toronto Blue Jays became the first team in baseball history to draw 4 million mark in attendance in 1991 season.

Team name	Season	Home attendance	Per game	Ballpark
Colorado Rockies	1993	4,483,350	55,350	Mile High Stadium
New York Yankees	2008	4,298,655	53,070	Yankee Stadium
New York Yankees	2007	4,271,867	52,739	Yankee Stadium
New York Yankees	2006	4,248,067	52,445	Yankee Stadium
New York Yankees	2005	4,090,696	50,502	Yankee Stadium
Toronto Blue Jays	1993	4,057,947	50,098	SkyDome
New York Mets	2008	4,042,045	49,902	Shea Stadium
Los Angeles Dodgers	2026	4,034,219	49,805	UNIQLO Field at Dodger Stadium
Toronto Blue Jays	1992	4,028,318	49,732	SkyDome
Los Angeles Dodgers	2025	4,012,470	49,537	Dodger Stadium
Toronto Blue Jays	1991	4,001,527	49,402	SkyDome

== Progression of home field attendance record ==
Season	Team	Home attendance	Per game	Ballpark
1993	Colorado Rockies	4,483,350	55,350	Mile High Stadium
1992	Toronto Blue Jays	4,028,318	49,732	SkyDome
1991	Toronto Blue Jays	4,001,527	49,402	SkyDome
1990	Toronto Blue Jays	3,885,284	47,966	SkyDome
1982	Los Angeles Dodgers	3,608,881	44,554	Dodger Stadium
1978	Los Angeles Dodgers	3,347,845	41,331	Dodger Stadium
1977	Los Angeles Dodgers	2,955,087	36,483	Dodger Stadium
1962	Los Angeles Dodgers	2,755,184	33,195	Dodger Stadium
1948	Cleveland Indians	2,620,627	33,172	Cleveland Stadium
1946	New York Yankees	2,265,512	29,422	Yankee Stadium
1929	Chicago Cubs	1,485,166	19,041	Wrigley Field
1920	New York Yankees	1,289,422	16,746	Polo Grounds IV
1908	New York Giants	910,000	11,375	Polo Grounds III
1905	Chicago White Sox	687,419	8,383	South Side Park II
1904	Boston Americans	623,295	7,695	Huntington Avenue Grounds
1903	New York Giants	579,530	8,279	Polo Grounds III
1895	Philadelphia Phillies	474,971	7,142	Baker Bowl
1894	New York Giants	387,000	5,650	Polo Grounds III
1888	New York Giants	305,455	4,663	Polo Grounds II
1887	New York Giants	270,945	4,406	Polo Grounds II
1883	St. Louis Browns (AA)	243,000	4,959	South End Grounds

== Highest and lowest attendance by season ==
Season	Team with highest attendance	High attendance	Team with lowest attendance	Low attendance
2026	Los Angeles Dodgers	4,034,219	Athletics	799,240
2025	Los Angeles Dodgers	4,012,470	Athletics	768,464
2024	Los Angeles Dodgers	3,941,521	Oakland Athletics	922,286
2023	Los Angeles Dodgers	3,837,079	Oakland Athletics	832,352
2022	Los Angeles Dodgers	3,861,408	Oakland Athletics	787,902
2021	Los Angeles Dodgers	2,804,693	Miami Marlins	642,617
2020 (Note: All games with paid attendance were played at Globe Life Field in Arlington, Texas, based on MLB standards for games with listed team as home team for playoff games. Only three teams played with paid attendance (Atlanta Braves in NLCS and Tampa Bay Rays, which had 34,325 attendance in the World Series games as the designated home team). 27 teams played all games behind closed doors under MLB regulations because of COVID-19. Only the National League Championship Series and World Series were played with spectators.)	Los Angeles Dodgers	77,407	Atlanta Braves	32,827
2019	Los Angeles Dodgers	3,974,309	Miami Marlins	811,302
2018	Los Angeles Dodgers	3,857,500	Miami Marlins	811,104
2017	Los Angeles Dodgers	3,765,856	Tampa Bay Rays	1,253,619
2016	Los Angeles Dodgers	3,703,312	Tampa Bay Rays	1,286,163
2015	Los Angeles Dodgers	3,764,815	Tampa Bay Rays	1,287,054
2014	Los Angeles Dodgers	3,782,337	Cleveland Indians	1,437,393
2013	Los Angeles Dodgers	3,743,527	Tampa Bay Rays	1,510,300
2012	Philadelphia Phillies	3,565,718	Tampa Bay Rays	1,559,681
2011	Philadelphia Phillies	3,680,718	Oakland Athletics	1,476,791
2010	Philadelphia Phillies	3,777,322	Cleveland Indians	1,391,644
2009	Los Angeles Dodgers	3,761,655	Oakland Athletics	1,408,783
2008	New York Yankees	4,298,655	Florida Marlins	1,335,076
2007	New York Yankees	4,271,083	Florida Marlins	1,370,511
2006	New York Yankees	4,248,067	Florida Marlins	1,164,134
2005	New York Yankees	4,090,696	Tampa Bay Devil Rays	1,141,669
2004	New York Yankees	3,775,292	Montreal Expos	749,550
2003	New York Yankees	3,465,600	Montreal Expos	1,025,639
2002	Seattle Mariners	3,542,938	Montreal Expos	812,045
2001	Seattle Mariners	3,507,326	Montreal Expos	642,745
2000	Cleveland Indians	3,456,278	Montreal Expos	926,272
1999	Colorado Rockies	3,481,065	Montreal Expos	773,277
1998	Colorado Rockies	3,792,683	Montreal Expos	914,909
1997	Colorado Rockies	3,888,453	Oakland Athletics	1,264,218
1996	Colorado Rockies	3,891,014	Oakland Athletics	1,148,380
1995	Colorado Rockies	3,390,037	Pittsburgh Pirates	905,517
1994	Colorado Rockies	3,281,511	San Diego Padres	953,857
1993	Colorado Rockies	4,483,350	San Diego Padres	1,375,432
1992	Toronto Blue Jays	4,028,318	Houston Astros	1,211,412
1991	Toronto Blue Jays	4,001,527	Montreal Expos	934,742
1990	Toronto Blue Jays	3,885,284	Atlanta Braves	980,129
1989	Toronto Blue Jays	3,375,883	Atlanta Braves	984,930
1988	New York Mets	3,055,445	Atlanta Braves	848,089
1987	St. Louis Cardinals	3,072,122	Cleveland Indians	1,077,898
1986	Los Angeles Dodgers	3,023,208	Pittsburgh Pirates	1,000,917
1985	Los Angeles Dodgers	3,264,593	Cleveland Indians	655,181
1984	Los Angeles Dodgers	3,134,824	Cleveland Indians	734,079
1983	Los Angeles Dodgers	3,510,313	Cleveland Indians	768,941
1982	Los Angeles Dodgers	3,608,881	Minnesota Twins	921,186
1981	Los Angeles Dodgers	2,381,292	Minnesota Twins	469,090
1980	Los Angeles Dodgers	3,249,287	Minnesota Twins	769,206
1979	Los Angeles Dodgers	2,860,954	Oakland Athletics	306,763
1978	Los Angeles Dodgers	3,347,845	Oakland Athletics	526,999
1977	Los Angeles Dodgers	2,955,087	Oakland Athletics	495,599
1976	Cincinnati Reds	2,629,708	San Francisco Giants	626,868
1975	Los Angeles Dodgers	2,539,349	San Francisco Giants	522,919
1974	Los Angeles Dodgers	2,632,474	San Francisco Giants	519,987
1973	Los Angeles Dodgers	2,136,192	San Diego Padres	611,826
1972	New York Mets	2,134,185	Milwaukee Brewers	600,440
1971	New York Mets	2,266,680	San Diego Padres	557,513
1970	New York Mets	2,697,479	Chicago White Sox	495,355
1969	New York Mets	2,175,373	San Diego Padres	512,970
1968	Detroit Tigers	2,031,847	Washington Senators	546,661
1967	St. Louis Cardinals	2,090,145	Cleveland Indians	662,980
1966	Los Angeles Dodgers	2,617,029	Washington Senators	576,260
1965	Los Angeles Dodgers	2,553,577	Kansas City Athletics	528,344
1964	Los Angeles Dodgers	2,228,751	Washington Senators	600,106
1963	Los Angeles Dodgers	2,538,602	Washington Senators	535,604
1962	Los Angeles Dodgers	2,755,184	Chicago Cubs	609,802
1961	Los Angeles Dodgers	1,804,250	Philadelphia Phillies	590,039
1960	Los Angeles Dodgers	2,253,887	Cincinnati Reds	663,486
1959	Los Angeles Dodgers	2,071,045	Washington Senators	615,372
1958	Milwaukee Braves	1,971,101	Washington Senators	475,288
1957	Milwaukee Braves	2,215,404	Washington Senators	457,079
1956	Milwaukee Braves	2,046,331	Washington Senators	431,647
1955	Milwaukee Braves	2,005,836	Washington Senators	425,238
1954	Milwaukee Braves	2,131,388	Philadelphia Athletics	304,666
1953	Milwaukee Braves	1,826,397	St. Louis Browns	297,238
1952	New York Yankees	1,629,665	Boston Braves	281,278
1951	New York Yankees	1,950,107	St. Louis Browns	293,790
1950	New York Yankees	2,081,380	St. Louis Browns	247,131
1949	New York Yankees	2,283,676	St. Louis Browns	270,936
1948	Cleveland Indians	2,620,627	St. Louis Browns	335,564
1947	New York Yankees	2,178,937	St. Louis Browns	320,474
1946	New York Yankees	2,265,512	St. Louis Browns	526,435
1945	Detroit Tigers	1,280,341	Philadelphia Phillies	285,057
1944	Detroit Tigers	923,176	Boston Braves	208,691
1943	Brooklyn Dodgers	661,739	St. Louis Browns	214,392
1942	Brooklyn Dodgers	1,037,765	Philadelphia Phillies	230,183
1941	Brooklyn Dodgers	1,214,910	St. Louis Browns	176,240
1940	Detroit Tigers	1,112,693	Philadelphia Phillies	207,177
1939	Cincinnati Reds	981,443	St. Louis Browns	109,159
1938	New York Yankees	970,916	St. Louis Browns	130,417
1937	Detroit Tigers	1,072,276	St. Louis Browns	123,121
1936	New York Yankees	976,913	St. Louis Browns	93,267
1935	Detroit Tigers	1,034,929	St. Louis Browns	80,922
1934	Detroit Tigers	919,161	St. Louis Browns	115,305
1933	New York Yankees	728,014	St. Louis Browns	88,113
1932	Chicago Cubs	974,688	St. Louis Browns	112,558
1931	Chicago Cubs	1,086,422	St. Louis Browns	179,126
1930	Chicago Cubs	1,463,624	St. Louis Browns	152,088
1929	Chicago Cubs	1,485,166	St. Louis Browns	280,697
1928	Chicago Cubs	1,143,740	Philadelphia Phillies	182,168
1927	New York Yankees	1,164,015	St. Louis Browns	247,879
1926	New York Yankees	1,027,675	Philadelphia Phillies	240,600
1925	Philadelphia Athletics	869,703	Boston Red Sox	267,782
1924	New York Yankees	1,053,533	Boston Braves	177,478
1923	New York Yankees	1,007,066	Boston Braves	227,802
1922	New York Yankees	1,026,134	Boston Braves	167,965
1921	New York Yankees	1,230,696	Philadelphia Phillies	273,961

== Largest crowds at a World Series game ==
Attendance	Opponents	Game number	Date	Stadium	Ref.
92,706	Chicago White Sox at Los Angeles Dodgers	Game 5	October 6, 1959	Los Angeles Memorial Coliseum	
92,650	Chicago White Sox at Los Angeles Dodgers	Game 4	October 5, 1959	Los Angeles Memorial Coliseum	
92,394	Chicago White Sox at Los Angeles Dodgers	Game 3	October 4, 1959	Los Angeles Memorial Coliseum	
86,288	Boston Braves at Cleveland Indians	Game 5	October 10, 1948	Cleveland Stadium	
81,897	Boston Braves at Cleveland Indians	Game 4	October 9, 1948	Cleveland Stadium	
78,102	New York Giants at Cleveland Indians	Game 4	October 2, 1954	Cleveland Stadium	
74,065	Brooklyn Dodgers at New York Yankees	Game 6	October 5, 1947	Yankee Stadium	
73,977	Brooklyn Dodgers at New York Yankees	Game 3	October 6, 1956	Yankee Stadium	
73,365	Brooklyn Dodgers at New York Yankees	Game 1	September 30, 1947	Yankee Stadium	
71,787	Brooklyn Dodgers at New York Yankees	Game 4	October 4, 1952	Yankee Stadium	
67,498	Cleveland Indians at Florida Marlins	Game 6	October 25, 1997	Hard Rock Stadium	
