= 1960 Major League Baseball All-Star Game (second game) =

1960 American baseball competition

	1	2	3	4	5	6	7	8	9	R	H	E
National League	0	2	1	0	0	0	1	0	2	6	10	0
American League	0	0	0	0	0	0	0	0	0	0	8	0
- Date: July 13, 1960
- Venue: Yankee Stadium
- City: Bronx, New York
- Managers: Walter Alston (LAD); Al López (CWS)
- Attendance: 38,362
- Television: NBC
- TV announcers: Mel Allen and Vin Scully
- Radio: NBC
- Radio announcers: Bob Elson and Waite Hoyt

The second 1960 Major League Baseball All-Star Game was the 29th playing of Major League Baseball's annual midsummer exhibition game. The game took place at Yankee Stadium in New York City, home of the American League's New York Yankees. The National League won the game by a score of 6–0. The National League hit four home runs, tying an All-Star Game record.

== Rosters ==
Players in italics have since been inducted into the National Baseball Hall of Fame.

=== American League ===
Starters
Position	Player	Team	All-Star Games
P	Whitey Ford	Yankees	7
C	Yogi Berra	Yankees	15
1B	Bill Skowron	Yankees	5
2B	Pete Runnels	Red Sox	4
3B	Frank Malzone	Red Sox	6
SS	Ron Hansen	Orioles	2
OF	Mickey Mantle	Yankees	11
OF	Roger Maris	Yankees	3
OF	Minnie Miñoso	White Sox	9

Pitchers
Position	Player	Team	All-Star Games
P	Gary Bell	Indians	2
P	Jim Coates	Yankees	2
P	Bud Daley	Athletics	4
P	Chuck Estrada	Orioles	2
P	Frank Lary	Tigers	2
P	Bill Monbouquette	Red Sox	2
P	Camilo Pascual-x	Senators	3
P	Gerry Staley	White Sox	4
P	Dick Stigman	Indians	2
P	Early Wynn	White Sox	9

Reserves
Position	Player	Team	All-Star Games
C	Elston Howard	Yankees	5
C	Sherm Lollar	White Sox	9
1B	Jim Gentile	Orioles	2
1B	Vic Power	Indians	6
2B	Nellie Fox	White Sox	12
3B	Brooks Robinson	Orioles	2
SS	Luis Aparicio	White Sox	5
OF	Al Kaline	Tigers	8
OF	Harvey Kuenn	Indians	10
OF	Jim Lemon-y	Senators	2
OF	Al Smith	White Sox	3
OF	Ted Williams	Red Sox	19

=== National League ===
Starters
Position	Player	Team	All-Star Games
P	Vern Law	Pirates	2
C	Del Crandall	Braves	9
1B	Joe Adcock	Braves	2
2B	Bill Mazeroski	Pirates	5
3B	Eddie Mathews	Braves	9
SS	Ernie Banks	Cubs	8
OF	Hank Aaron	Braves	8
OF	Willie Mays	Giants	9
OF	Bob Skinner	Pirates	3

Pitchers
Position	Player	Team	All-Star Games
P	Bob Buhl	Braves	2
P	Roy Face	Pirates	4
P	Bob Friend	Pirates	4
P	Bill Henry	Reds	2
P	Larry Jackson	Cardinals	4
P	Mike McCormick	Giants	2
P	Lindy McDaniel	Cardinals	2
P	Johnny Podres	Dodgers	3
P	Stan Williams	Dodgers	2

Reserves
Position	Player	Team	All-Star Games
C	Ed Bailey	Reds	4
C	Smoky Burgess	Pirates	6
1B	Norm Larker	Dodgers	2
1B	Bill White	Cardinals	3
2B	Charlie Neal	Dodgers	3
2B	Tony Taylor	Phillies	2
3B	Ken Boyer	Cardinals	5
SS	Dick Groat	Pirates	4
OF	Orlando Cepeda	Giants	4
OF	Roberto Clemente	Pirates	2
OF	Stan Musial	Cardinals	19
OF	Vada Pinson	Reds	4

  - -x – Injured and could not play
  - -y – Injury replacement

== Game ==
For many local New York fans, the second All-Star Game marked the return of Willie Mays to New York. Against starting pitcher Whitey Ford, Mays led off the game with a single, then homered in the third. Eddie Mathews and Stan Musial also hit home runs in the game. The All-Star game also marked the nineteenth and final All-Star appearance of Ted Williams, who left the competition with a .304 average, four home runs, twelve runs batted in and ten runs scored.

Umpires: Nestor Chylak, Home Plate (AL); Dusty Boggess, First Base (NL); Jim Honochick, Second Base (AL); Tom Gorman, Third Base (NL); Johnny Stevens, Left Field (AL); Vinnie Smith, Right Field (NL)

=== Starting lineups ===
National League				American League			
Order	Player	Team	Position	Order	Player	Team	Position
1	Willie Mays	Giants	OF	1	Minnie Miñoso	White Sox	OF
2	Bob Skinner	Pirates	OF	2	Pete Runnels	Red Sox	2B
3	Hank Aaron	Braves	OF	3	Roger Maris	Yankees	OF
4	Ernie Banks	Cubs	SS	4	Mickey Mantle	Yankees	OF
5	Joe Adcock	Braves	1B	5	Bill Skowron	Yankees	1B
6	Eddie Mathews	Braves	3B	6	Yogi Berra	Yankees	C
7	Bill Mazeroski	Pirates	2B	7	Frank Malzone	Red Sox	3B
8	Del Crandall	Braves	C	8	Ron Hansen	Orioles	SS
9	Vern Law	Pirates	P	9	Whitey Ford	Yankees	P

=== Game summary ===
Wednesday, July 13, 1960 1:00 pm (ET) at Yankee Stadium in Bronx, New York
Team	1	2	3	4	5	6	7	8	9	R	H	E
National League	0	2	1	0	0	0	1	0	2	6	10	0
American League	0	0	0	0	0	0	0	0	0	0	8	0
WP: Vern Law (1–0) LP: Whitey Ford (0–1); Home runs: NL: Eddie Mathews (1), Willie Mays (1), Stan Musial (1), Ken Boyer (1); AL: None
