= 1963 Philadelphia Phillies season =

Major League Baseball season

1963 Philadelphia Phillies
- League: National League
- Ballpark: Connie Mack Stadium
- City: Philadelphia
- Record: 87–75 (.537)
- League place: 4th
- Owner: R. R. M. Carpenter, Jr.
- General manager: John J. Quinn
- Manager: Gene Mauch
- Television: WFIL
- Radio: WFIL (By Saam, Bill Campbell, Richie Ashburn)

The 1963 Philadelphia Phillies season was the 81st in franchise history. The 87 wins and 75 losses Phillies finished the season in 4th place in the National League, 12 games behind the National League and World Series Champion Los Angeles Dodgers.

== Offseason ==
- November 21, 1962: Jimmie Coker purchased from the Phillies by the Baltimore Orioles.
- November 26, 1962: Bob Lipski was drafted from the Phillies by the Cleveland Indians in the 1962 rule 5 draft.
- December 11, 1962: Jacke Davis was traded by the Phillies to the Los Angeles Angels for Earl Averill, Jr.

== Regular season ==
On May 17, 1963, Don Nottebart pitched the first no-hitter for an expansion team when the Houston Colt .45s defeated Philadelphia by a score of 4–1.

The Phillies 1950 pennant winning team was honored with a parade through Center City, Philadelphia on June 5, 1963 and luncheon at the Warwick Hotel with Philadelphia Mayor James Tate, MLB Commission Ford Frick, and National League President Warren Giles. That evening the 1950 players faced the 1963 Phillies in an exhibition at Connie Mack Stadium prior to the game against the St. Louis Cardinals.

=== Season standings ===
National League
Team	W	L	Pct.	GB	Home	Road
Los Angeles Dodgers	99	63	.611	—	50‍–‍31	49‍–‍32
St. Louis Cardinals	93	69	.574	6	53‍–‍28	40‍–‍41
San Francisco Giants	88	74	.543	11	50‍–‍31	38‍–‍43
Philadelphia Phillies	87	75	.537	12	45‍–‍36	42‍–‍39
Cincinnati Reds	86	76	.531	13	46‍–‍35	40‍–‍41
Milwaukee Braves	84	78	.519	15	45‍–‍36	39‍–‍42
Chicago Cubs	82	80	.506	17	43‍–‍38	39‍–‍42
Pittsburgh Pirates	74	88	.457	25	42‍–‍39	32‍–‍49
Houston Colt .45s	66	96	.407	33	44‍–‍37	22‍–‍59
New York Mets	51	111	.315	48	34‍–‍47	17‍–‍64

=== Record vs. opponents ===
1963 National League record Sources:
Team	CHC	CIN	HOU	LAD	MIL	NYM	PHI	PIT	SF	STL
Chicago	—	9–9	9–9	7–11	12–6	11–7	9–9	8–10	10–8	7–11
Cincinnati	9–9	—	11–7	8–10	10–8	10–8	8–10	11–7	8–10	11–7
Houston	9–9	7–11	—	5–13	5–13	13–5	8–10	6–12	8–10	5–13
Los Angeles	11–7	10–8	13–5	—	8–10–1	16–2	7–11	13–5	9–9	12–6
Milwaukee	6–12	8–10	13–5	10–8–1	—	12–6	10–8	7–11	10–8	8–10
New York	7–11	8–10	5–13	2–16	6–12	—	8–10	4–14	6–12	5–13
Philadelphia	9–9	10–8	10–8	11–7	8–10	10–8	—	13–5	8–10	8–10
Pittsburgh	10–8	7–11	12–6	5–13	11–7	14–4	5–13	—	5–13	5–13
San Francisco	8–10	10–8	10–8	9–9	8–10	12–6	10–8	13–5	—	8–10
St. Louis	11–7	7–11	13–5	6–12	10–8	13–5	10–8	13–5	10–8	—

=== Notable transactions ===
- June 12, 1963: Darrell Sutherland was signed as an amateur free agent by the Phillies.
- August 24, 1963: Dwight Siebler was purchased from the Phillies by the Minnesota Twins.

=== Game log ===
Legend
	Phillies win
	Phillies loss
	Postponement
**Bold**	Phillies team member

1963 Game Log
Overall Record: 87–75
April (8–10)

#	Date	Opponent	Score	Win	Loss	Save	Attendance	Record
1	April 9	Reds	2–1	**Art Mahaffey** (1–0)	Joey Jay (0–1)	None	28,291	1–0
2	April 10	Reds	10–7	**Ray Culp** (1–0)	Bill Henry (0–1)	**Jack Baldschun** (1)	6,065	2–0
3	April 13	@ Cardinals	0–7	Curt Simmons (1–0)	**Art Mahaffey** (1–1)	None	22,050	2–1
4	April 14 (1)	@ Cardinals	4–3 (10)	**Jack Baldschun** (1–0)	Bobby Shantz (0–1)	**Jack Hamilton** (1)	see 2nd game	3–1
5	April 14 (2)	@ Cardinals	5–4	**Jack Baldschun** (2–0)	Ron Taylor (0–1)	None	19,257	4–1
6	April 16	@ Braves	0–8	Warren Spahn (2–0)	**Cal McLish** (0–1)	None	4,098	4–2
7	April 17	@ Braves	5–6	Lew Burdette (2–0)	**Paul Brown** (0–1)	Claude Raymond (1)	10,569	4–3
8	April 18	@ Braves	5–6	Claude Raymond (2–0)	**Ray Culp** (1–1)	None	4,256	4–4
9	April 19	Cardinals	1–5	Curt Simmons (2–0)	**Chris Short** (0–1)	None	14,712	4–5
10	April 20	Cardinals	6–2	**Marcelino López** (1–0)	Ray Sadecki (0–1)	**Jack Baldschun** (2)	5,353	5–5
11	April 21 (1)	Cardinals	4–3 (10)	**Dallas Green** (1–0)	Ed Bauta (0–1)	None	see 2nd game	6–5
12	April 21 (2)	Cardinals	5–10	Harry Fanok (2–0)	**Art Mahaffey** (1–2)	None	23,187	6–6
13	April 22	Mets	8–6	**Ray Culp** (2–1)	Tracy Stallard (0–2)	**Jack Baldschun** (3)	3,716	7–6
14	April 24	Pirates	4–6	Bob Friend (3–0)	**Chris Short** (0–2)	Roy Face (3)	4,485	7–7
15	April 26	@ Cubs	5–2	**Art Mahaffey** (2–2)	Glen Hobbie (1–2)	None	4,093	8–7
16	April 27	@ Cubs	2–4	Larry Jackson (3–2)	**Ray Culp** (2–2)	None	10,204	8–8
17	April 28	@ Cubs	1–4	Bob Buhl (2–2)	**Chris Short** (0–3)	Don Elston (2)	11,135	8–9
18	April 29	Giants	3–4	Jack Fisher (1–2)	**Cal McLish** (0–2)	None	8,233	8–10
–	April 30	Giants	Postponed (rain); Makeup: July 10					

May (14–15)

#	Date	Opponent	Score	Win	Loss	Save	Attendance	Record
–	May 1	Dodgers	Postponed (rain); Makeup: September 13 as a traditional double-header					
19	May 2	Dodgers	2–3	Ron Perranoski (3–1)	**Art Mahaffey** (2–3)	None	11,288	8–11
20	May 3	Colt .45s	4–3	**Jack Hamilton** (1–0)	Bob Bruce (1–2)	**Jack Baldschun** (4)	5,843	9–11
21	May 4	Colt .45s	7–0	**Ray Culp** (3–2)	Ken Johnson (1–4)	None	3,361	10–11
22	May 5 (1)	Colt .45s	6–5	**Jack Hamilton** (2–0)	Hal Woodeshick (1–1)	None	see 2nd game	11–11
23	May 5 (2)	Colt .45s	2–6	Turk Farrell (2–3)	**Johnny Klippstein** (0–1)	None	11,185	11–12
24	May 7	@ Mets	1–3	Al Jackson (3–2)	**Art Mahaffey** (2–4)	None	8,962	11–13
25	May 8	@ Mets	2–3	Jay Hook (1–4)	**Jack Baldschun** (2–1)	None	4,237	11–14
26	May 9	@ Mets	2–3	Ken MacKenzie (3–0)	**Jack Baldschun** (2–2)	None	3,435	11–15
27	May 10	Braves	1–4 (7)	Denny Lemaster (1–1)	**Chris Short** (0–4)	None	11,904	11–16
28	May 11	Braves	8–5	**Ryne Duren** (1–0)	Hank Fischer (0–2)	None	3,192	12–16
29	May 12 (1)	Braves	4–3 (11)	**Jack Baldschun** (3–2)	Tony Cloninger (0–2)	None	see 2nd game	13–16
30	May 12 (2)	Braves	6–5 (12)	**Johnny Klippstein** (1–1)	Lew Burdette (3–4)	None	9,836	14–16
31	May 14	@ Dodgers	5–1	**Cal McLish** (1–2)	Don Drysdale (3–4)	None	19,294	15–16
32	May 15	@ Dodgers	2–3 (12)	Sandy Koufax (5–1)	**Johnny Klippstein** (1–2)	None	20,512	15–17
33	May 16	@ Colt .45s	5–2	**Ray Culp** (4–2)	Dick Drott (1–1)	**Jack Baldschun** (5)	7,027	16–17
34	May 17	@ Colt .45s	1–4	Don Nottebart (5–1)	**Jack Hamilton** (2–1)	None	8,223	16–18
35	May 18	@ Colt .45s	2–3	Ken Johnson (2–6)	**Jack Baldschun** (3–3)	None	5,409	16–19
36	May 19 (1)	@ Giants	3–0	**Cal McLish** (2–2)	Jack Fisher (3–4)	None	see 2nd game	17–19
37	May 19 (2)	@ Giants	5–6	Bobby Bolin (2–0)	**Ryne Duren** (1–1)	None	37,632	17–20
38	May 21	@ Giants	2–3	Billy O'Dell (6–0)	**Ray Culp** (4–3)	None	7,556	17–21
39	May 22	@ Giants	2–10	Jack Sanford (7–3)	**Dallas Green** (1–1)	None	6,501	17–22
40	May 24	@ Reds	5–1	**Cal McLish** (3–2)	Bob Purkey (1–1)	None	9,367	18–22
41	May 25	@ Reds	2–5	Joe Nuxhall (4–2)	**Art Mahaffey** (2–5)	None	5,419	18–23
42	May 26 (1)	@ Reds	10–4	**Chris Short** (1–4)	Jim Maloney (6–2)	**Jack Baldschun** (6)	see 2nd game	19–23
43	May 26 (2)	@ Reds	3–0	**Ray Culp** (5–3)	Joey Jay (1–8)	None	14,417	20–23
44	May 28	@ Pirates	5–1	**Cal McLish** (4–2)	Bob Friend (5–4)	None	8,497	21–23
45	May 30 (1)	@ Pirates	1–7	Don Cardwell (2–6)	**Art Mahaffey** (2–6)	None	see 2nd game	21–24
46	May 30 (2)	@ Pirates	6–5	**Ray Culp** (6–3)	Joe Gibbon (2–3)	**Johnny Klippstein** (1)	19,039	22–24
47	May 31	Cubs	1–2	Bob Buhl (4–4)	**Chris Short'** (1–5)	Lindy McDaniel (9)	10,717	22–25

June (13–16)

#	Date	Opponent	Score	Win	Loss	Save	Attendance	Record
48	June 1	Cubs	0–2	Dick Ellsworth (7–3)	**John Boozer** (0–1)	None	3,902	22–26
49	June 2 (1)	Cubs	5–2	**Cal McLish** (5–2)	Jim Brewer (2–1)	None	see 2nd game	23–26
50	June 2 (2)	Cubs	2–3^{^{[a]}}	Barney Schultz (1–0)	**Art Mahaffey** (2–7)	Lindy McDaniel (10)	8,009	23–27
51	June 5	Cardinals	6–0	**Ray Culp** (7–3)	Curt Simmons (6–2)	None	35,621	24–27
52	June 6	Cardinals	4–5	Bob Gibson (4–3)	**Chris Short** (1–6)	Ray Sadecki (1)	8,280	24–28
–	June 7	Reds	Postponed (rain); Makeup: August 6 as a traditional double-header					
53	June 8	Reds	0–1	Jim O'Toole (10–3)	**Art Mahaffey** (2–8)	None	4,519	24–29
54	June 9 (1)	Reds	8–7 (10)	**Johnny Klippstein** (2–2)	Dom Zanni (0–1)	None	see 2nd game	25–29
55	June 9 (2)	Reds	1–3	John Tsitouris (1–1)	**John Boozer** (0–2)	None	14,289	25–30
56	June 10	Braves	6–2 (6)	**Ray Culp** (8–3)	Bob Hendley (4–4)	None	9,404	26–30
57	June 11	Braves	8–7 (10)	**Jack Baldschun** (4–3)	Bob Shaw (2–4)	None	11,107	27–30
58	June 12	@ Cardinals	6–2	**Art Mahaffey** (3–8)	Ron Taylor (3–2)	**John Boozer** (1)	11,738	28–30
59	June 13	@ Cardinals	3–7 (6)	Ernie Broglio (7–2)	**Chris Short** (1–7)	None	7,600	28–31
60	June 14	@ Braves	0–3	Warren Spahn (9–3)	**Ray Culp** (8–4)	None	10,937	28–32
61	June 15	@ Braves	3–5	Tony Cloninger (1–3)	**Johnny Klippstein** (2–3)	None	6,855	28–33
62	June 16 (1)	@ Braves	3–5	Frank Funk (2–2)	**Cal McLish** (5–3)	Claude Raymond (4)	see 2nd game	28–34
63	June 16 (2)	@ Braves	7–4 (11)	**Jack Baldschun** (5–3)	Claude Raymond (4–4)	**Dallas Green** (1)	16,326	29–34
64	June 17	@ Reds	4–2	**Ryne Duren** (2–1)	John Tsitouris (2–2)	**Jack Baldschun** (7)	6,093	30–34
65	June 18	@ Reds	1–2	Al Worthington (2–1)	**Ray Culp** (8–5)	None	6,646	30–35
66	June 19	@ Reds	5–6 (10)	Dom Zanni (1–1)	**Chris Short** (1–8)	None	7,237	30–36
67	June 20	@ Reds	1–11	Jim O'Toole (13–3)	**Art Mahaffey** (3–9)	Jim Owens (2)	7,077	30–37
68	June 21	@ Mets	1–3	Al Jackson (6–7)	**Cal McLish** (5–4)	None	11,047	30–38
69	June 22	@ Mets	2–0	**Ray Culp** (9–5)	Roger Craig (2–11)	None	16,791	31–38
70	June 23 (1)	@ Mets	0–5	Carl Willey (6–6)	**Dallas Green** (1–2)	None	see 2nd game	31–39
71	June 23 (2)	@ Mets	1–4	Tracy Stallard (3–4)	**Ryne Duren** (2–2)	Al Jackson (1)	19,901	31–40
72	June 25	@ Pirates	5–4 (10)	**Johnny Klippstein** (3–3)	Harvey Haddix (2–3)	**Dennis Bennett** (1)	12,365	32–40
73	June 26	@ Pirates	6–2	**Cal McLish** (6–4)	Bob Friend (9–6)	None	9,153	33–40
74	June 27	@ Pirates	13–4	**Ray Culp** (10–5)	Don Cardwell (3–9)	**Johnny Klippstein** (2)	9,576	34–40
75	June 28	Cubs	3–4 (11)	Dick Ellsworth (10–6)	**Jack Baldschun** (5–4)	None	9,653	34–41
–	June 29	Cubs	Postponed (rain); Makeup: August 14 as a traditional double-header					
76	June 30	Cubs	3–2	**Art Mahaffey** (4–9)	Larry Jackson (9–7)	**Johnny Klippstein** (3)	6,006	35–41

July (21–10)

#	Date	Opponent	Score	Win	Loss	Save	Attendance	Record
77	July 1 (1)	Pirates	1–2	Don Cardwell (4–9)	**Ray Culp** (10–6)	None	see 2nd game	35–42
78	July 1 (2)	Pirates	8–1	**Cal McLish** (7–4)	Earl Francis (3–3)	None	21,661	36–42
79	July 2	Pirates	2–3	Vern Law (2–3)	**Dallas Green** (1–3)	Al McBean (4)	6,844	36–43
80	July 4 (1)	Pirates	1–0 (10)	**Art Mahaffey** (5–9)	Bob Friend (10–7)	None	see 2nd game	37–43
81	July 4 (2)	Pirates	5–1	**Ryne Duren** (3–2)	Joe Gibbon (3–6)	None	16,198	38–43
82	July 5	@ Cubs	2–3 (11)	Lindy McDaniel (5–2)	**Johnny Klippstein** (3–4)	None	17,395	38–44
83	July 6	@ Cubs	6–0	**Cal McLish** (8–4)	Bob Buhl (7–6)	None	16,348	39–44
84	July 7	@ Cubs	3–2	**Jack Baldschun** (6–4)	Lindy McDaniel (5–3)	**Dallas Green** (2)	18,277	40–44
–	July 9	**1963 Major League Baseball All-Star Game at Cleveland Stadium in Cleveland**						
85	July 10	Giants	10–2	**Cal McLish** (9–4)	Billy O'Dell (10–5)	**Johnny Klippstein** (4)	12,240	41–44
86	July 11	Giants	3–4	Juan Marichal (14–4)	**Ray Culp** (10–7)	Bobby Bolin (7)	26,303	41–45
87	July 12	Giants	7–5	**Art Mahaffey** (6–9)	Jack Sanford (9–9)	**Jack Baldschun** (8)	22,496	42–45
88	July 13	Giants	4–3	**Ryne Duren** (4–2)	Billy Pierce (3–6)	**Jack Baldschun** (9)	10,453	43–45
89	July 14	Dodgers	2–3 (6)	Johnny Podres (8–6)	**Cal McLish** (9–5)	None	23,542	43–46
90	July 15	Dodgers	5–4 (11)	**Jack Baldschun** (7–4)	Ed Roebuck (2–4)	None	19,488	44–46
91	July 16 (1)	Dodgers	2–5	Sandy Koufax (16–3)	**Art Mahaffey** (6–10)	None	see 2nd game	44–47
92	July 16 (2)	Dodgers	10–2	**Dallas Green** (2–3)	Nick Willhite (2–3)	None	35,353	45–47
93	July 17	Colt .45s	10–9 (10)	**Dennis Bennett** (1–0)	Jim Dickson (0–1)	None	5,796	46–47
94	July 18	Colt .45s	5–1	**John Boozer** (1–2)	Ken Johnson (5–13)	None	5,646	47–47
95	July 19	Mets	2–1	**Jack Baldschun** (8–4)	Roger Craig (2–16)	None	10,754	48–47
96	July 20	Mets	5–1	**Dallas Green** (3–3)	Al Jackson (6–11)	None	3,440	49–47
97	July 21 (1)	Mets	8–0	**Chris Short** (2–8)	Carl Willey (7–9)	None	see 2nd game	50–47
98	July 21 (2)	Mets	7–2	**Dennis Bennett** (2–0)	Tracy Stallard (3–8)	**Johnny Klippstein** (5)	14,372	51–47
99	July 23	@ Colt .45s	5–6 (15)	Turk Farrell (7–8)	**Johnny Klippstein** (3–5)	None	8,553	51–48
100	July 24	@ Colt .45s	6–3	**Cal McLish** (10–5)	Ken Johnson (5–14)	**Jack Baldschun** (10)	6,879	52–48
101	July 25	@ Colt .45s	0–3	Hal Brown (4–5)	**Ray Culp** (10–8)	None	5,357	52–49
102	July 26	@ Dodgers	6–5	**Chris Short** (3–8)	Bob Miller (7–6)	**Jack Baldschun** (11)	30,589	53–49
103	July 27	@ Dodgers	4–1	**Dennis Bennett** (3–0)	Johnny Podres (10–7)	**Johnny Klippstein** (6)	36,262	54–49
104	July 28	@ Dodgers	7–4	**John Boozer** (2–2)	Don Drysdale (13–11)	None	32,996	55–49
105	July 29	@ Dodgers	2–6	Sandy Koufax (17–4)	**Cal McLish** (10–6)	None	32,835	55–50
106	July 30	@ Giants	0–5	Billy O'Dell (11–6)	**Ray Culp** (10–9)	None	20,686	55–51
107	July 31	@ Giants	7–3 (14)	**Jack Baldschun** (9–4)	Bobby Bolin (6–4)	**Johnny Klippstein** (7)	17,927	56–51

August (16–13)

#	Date	Opponent	Score	Win	Loss	Save	Attendance	Record
108	August 2	@ Cardinals	2–3	Ray Sadecki (7–7)	**Dennis Bennett** (3–1)	Bobby Shantz (9)	20,025	56–52
109	August 3	@ Cardinals	0–7	Ernie Broglio (12–7)	**Cal McLish** (10–7)	None	11,417	56–53
110	August 4 (1)	@ Cardinals	7–3	**Ray Culp** (11–9)	Lew Burdette (8–9)	**Jack Baldschun** (12)	see 2nd game	57–53
111	August 4 (2)	@ Cardinals	5–2	**Dallas Green** (4–3)	Bob Gibson (12–6)	**Jack Baldschun** (13)	26,039	58–53
112	August 6 (1)	Reds	4–6 (10)	Bill Henry (1–2)	**Jack Baldschun** (9–5)	None	see 2nd game	58–54
113	August 6 (2)	Reds	7–1	**Dennis Bennett** (4–1)	Joey Jay (4–16)	None	32,761	59–54
114	August 7	Reds	2–1	**Cal McLish** (11–7)	Jim Maloney (17–4)	None	9,964	60–54
115	August 8	Reds	3–6	John Tsitouris (8–5)	**Chris Short** (3–9)	Bill Henry (9)	15,058	60–55
116	August 9	Giants	0–4	Juan Marichal (18–5)	**Ray Culp** (11–10)	None	27,145	60–56
117	August 10	Giants	6–7	Bobby Bolin (7–4)	**Dennis Bennett** (4–2)	Billy Hoeft (2)	11,012	60–57
118	August 11	Giants	1–5	Jack Sanford (11–12)	**Cal McLish** (11–8)	Don Larsen (4)	15,874	60–58
119	August 12	Giants	3–1	**Chris Short** (4–9)	Jim Duffalo (4–1)	None	20,671	61–58
120	August 14 (1)	Cubs	7–2	**Johnny Klippstein** (4–5)	Larry Jackson (13–11)	None	see 2nd game	62–58
121	August 14 (2)	Cubs	9–3	**Dennis Bennett** (5–2)	Paul Toth (3–8)	None	22,553	63–58
122	August 15	Cubs	4–3	**Cal McLish** (12–8)	Bob Buhl (9–11)	**Jack Baldschun** (14)	13,403	64–58
123	August 16	@ Pirates	3–0	**Chris Short** (5–9)	Joe Gibbon (5–8)	None	12,031	65–58
124	August 17	@ Pirates	5–3	**Ryne Duren** (5–2)	Bob Friend (14–11)	None	7,881	66–58
125	August 18	@ Pirates	3–1	**Johnny Klippstein** (5–5)	Don Schwall (6–8)	None	10,696	67–58
126	August 19	Mets	1–0	**Dennis Bennett** (6–2)	Galen Cisco (7–13)	None	7,980	68–58
127	August 20 (1)	Mets	0–4	Grover Powell (1–0)	**Cal McLish** (12–9)	None	see 2nd game	68–59
128	August 20 (2)	Mets	2–1 (12)	**Ryne Duren** (6–2)	Larry Bearnarth (2–5)	None	24,923	69–59
–	August 21	Mets	Postponed (rain); Makeup: September 9					
129	August 23	Pirates	4–2	**Dennis Bennett** (7–2)	Don Schwall (6–9)	**Jack Baldschun** (15)	18,126	70–59
130	August 24	Pirates	0–7	Don Cardwell (12–12)	**Chris Short** (5–10)	None	18,276	70–60
131	August 25	Pirates	4–2 (11)	**Jack Baldschun** (10–5)	Roy Face (3–7)	None	10,183	71–60
132	August 27	@ Cubs	3–4	Lindy McDaniel (9–6)	**Jack Baldschun** (10–6)	None	11,785	71–61
133	August 28	@ Cubs	8–7	**Dallas Green** (5–3)	Paul Toth (5–9)	**Ryne Duren** (1)	6,113	72–61
134	August 29	@ Cubs	1–2	Dick Ellsworth (19–7)	**John Boozer** (2–3)	None	10,954	72–62
135	August 30	Cardinals	6–11	Ray Sadecki (8–8)	**Ray Culp** (11–11)	Ron Taylor (8)	26,988	72–63
136	August 31	Cardinals	5–7 (11)	Bobby Shantz (5–3)	**Johnny Klippstein** (5–6)	None	11,382	72–64

September (15–11)

#	Date	Opponent	Score	Win	Loss	Save	Attendance	Record
137	September 1	Cardinals	3–7	Curt Simmons (12–7)	**Chris Short** (5–11)	None	17,575	72–65
138	September 2	@ Braves	9–4	**Cal McLish** (13–9)	Tony Cloninger (9–9)	None	13,654	73–65
139	September 3	@ Braves	2–0	**Ray Culp** (12–11)	Denny Lemaster (11–9)	None	4,949	74–65
140	September 4	@ Reds	3–2	**Dennis Bennett** (8–2)	Jim O'Toole (17–12)	None	4,906	75–65
141	September 6	Braves	0–5	Bob Shaw (6–10)	**Cal McLish** (13–10)	None	10,767	75–66
142	September 7	Braves	4–6 (10)	Bobby Tiefenauer (1–1)	**Jack Baldschun** (10–7)	None	11,589	75–67
143	September 8	Braves	2–3	Warren Spahn (20–5)	**Dallas Green** (5–4)	None	8,807	75–68
144	September 9	Mets	3–6	Roger Craig (5–20)	**Dennis Bennett** (8–3)	None	3,232	75–69
145	September 10	Colt .45s	16–0	**Chris Short** (6–11)	Don Nottebart (9–7)	None	3,645	76–69
146	September 11	Colt .45s	2–4	Turk Farrell (12–13)	**Cal McLish** (13–11)	None	3,412	76–70
147	September 12	Colt .45s	4–1	**Ray Culp** (13–11)	Hal Brown (5–11)	None	2,849	77–70
148	September 13 (1)	Dodgers	3–2	**Chris Short** (7–11)	Larry Sherry (2–6)	None	see 2nd game	78–70
149	September 13 (2)	Dodgers	1–2	Ron Perranoski (15–3)	**Dennis Bennett** (8–4)	None	26,024	78–71
150	September 14	Dodgers	1–5	Pete Richert (5–1)	**John Boozer** (2–4)	None	10,410	78–72
151	September 15	Dodgers	6–1	**Dallas Green** (6–4)	Don Drysdale (17–17)	None	16,796	79–72
152	September 17	@ Mets	8–6	**Ray Culp** (14–11)	Tracy Stallard (6–16)	**Johnny Klippstein** (8)	2,047	80–72
153	September 18	@ Mets	5–1	**Chris Short** (8–11)	Craig Anderson (0–1)	None	1,752	81–72
154	September 20	@ Colt .45s	2–3	Ken Johnson (10–17)	**Dennis Bennett** (8–5)	None	4,039	81–73
155	September 21	@ Colt .45s	4–3	**Dallas Green** (7–4)	Hal Woodeshick (11–9)	None	2,231	82–73
156	September 22	@ Colt .45s	1–2	Turk Farrell (14–13)	**Chris Short** (8–12)	None	3,493	82–74
157	September 24	@ Giants	5–4	**Jack Baldschun** (11–7)	Don Larsen (7–7)	None	8,360	83–74
158	September 25	@ Giants	6–4	**Art Mahaffey** (7–10)	Billy Pierce (3–11)	**Jack Baldschun** (16)	4,360	84–74
159	September 26	@ Giants	0–10	Billy O'Dell (14–10)	**Dallas Green** (7–5)	None	3,691	84–75
160	September 27	@ Dodgers	5–3	**John Boozer** (3–4)	Pete Richert (5–2)	**Ryne Duren** (2)	34,689	85–75
161	September 28	@ Dodgers	12–3	**Dennis Bennett** (9–5)	Johnny Podres (14–12)	None	37,212	86–75
162	September 29	@ Dodgers	3–1	**Chris Short** (9–12)	Pete Richert (5–3)	None	19,237	87–75

^{^[a]}The June 2, 1963 (game 2), game was protested by the Phillies in the bottom of the third inning. The protest was later denied.

=== Roster ===
1963 Philadelphia Phillies
**Roster**
**Pitchers**: 27 Jack Baldschun; 23 Dennis Bennett; 29 John Boozer; 39 Paul Brown; 37 Ray Culp; 18 Ryne Duren; 46 Dallas Green; 48 Jack Hamilton; 45 Johnny Klippstein; 34 Bobby Locke; 44 Marcelino López; 28 Art Mahaffey; 26 Cal McLish; 41 Chris Short	**Catchers**: 17 Earl Averill; 11 Clay Dalrymple; 10 Bob Oldis; **Infielders**: 20 Rubén Amaro; 9 Cal Emery; 12 Don Hoak; 32 Billy Klaus; 16 Cookie Rojas; 5 Roy Sievers; 8 Tony Taylor; 14 Frank Torre; 7 Bobby Wine	**Outfielders**: 32 Dick Allen; 6 Johnny Callison; 43 Wes Covington; 24 Don Demeter; 25 Tony González; 34 Wayne Graham; 44 John Herrnstein; 9 Jim Lemon; **Other batters**: 9 Mickey Harrington	**Manager**: 4 Gene Mauch; **Coaches**: 3 Peanuts Lowrey; 1 Al Vincent; 2 Al Widmar

== Player stats ==
=== Batting ===
==== Starters by position ====
Note: Pos = Position; G = Games played; AB = At bats; H = Hits; Avg. = Batting average; HR = Home runs; RBI = Runs batted in

Pos	Player	G	AB	H	Avg.	HR	RBI
C	Clay Dalrymple	142	452	114	.252	10	40
1B	Roy Sievers	138	450	108	.240	19	82
2B	Tony Taylor	157	640	180	.281	5	49
SS	Bobby Wine	142	418	90	.215	6	44
3B	Don Hoak	115	377	87	.231	6	24
LF	Wes Covington	119	353	107	.303	17	64
CF	Tony González	155	555	170	.306	4	66
RF	Johnny Callison	157	626	178	.284	26	78

==== Other batters ====
Note: G = Games played; AB = At bats; H = Hits; Avg. = Batting average; HR = Home runs; RBI = Runs batted in

Player	G	AB	H	Avg.	HR	RBI
Don Demeter	154	515	133	.258	22	83
Rubén Amaro	115	217	47	.217	2	19
Frank Torre	92	112	28	.250	1	10
Bob Oldis	47	85	19	.224	0	8
Cookie Rojas	64	77	17	.221	1	2
Earl Averill	47	71	19	.268	3	8
Jim Lemon	31	59	16	.271	2	6
Dick Allen	10	24	7	.292	0	2
Wayne Graham	10	22	4	.182	0	0
Cal Emery	16	19	3	.158	0	0
Billy Klaus	11	18	1	.056	0	0
John Herrnstein	15	12	2	.167	1	1
Mickey Harrington	1	0	0	----	0	0

=== Pitching ===
==== Starting pitchers ====
Note: G = Games pitched; IP = Innings pitched; W = Wins; L = Losses; ERA = Earned run average; SO = Strikeouts

Player	G	IP	W	L	ERA	SO
Cal McLish	32	209.2	13	11	3.26	98
Ray Culp	34	203.1	14	11	2.97	176
Chris Short	38	198.0	9	12	2.95	160
Art Mahaffey	26	149.0	7	10	3.99	97
Dennis Bennett	23	119.1	9	5	2.64	82

==== Other pitchers ====
Note: G = Games pitched; IP = Innings pitched; W = Wins; L = Losses; ERA = Earned run average; SO = Strikeouts

Player	G	IP	W	L	ERA	SO
Dallas Green	40	120.0	7	5	3.23	68
Ryne Duren	33	87.1	6	2	3.30	84
John Boozer	26	83.0	3	4	2.93	69
Paul Brown	6	15.1	0	1	4.11	11
Marcelino López	4	6.0	1	0	6.00	2

==== Relief pitchers ====
Note: G = Games pitched; W = Wins; L = Losses; SV = Saves; ERA = Earned run average; SO = Strikeouts

Player	G	W	L	SV	ERA	SO
Jack Baldschun	65	11	7	16	2.30	89
Johnny Klippstein	49	5	6	8	1.93	86
Jack Hamilton	19	2	1	1	5.40	23
Bobby Locke	9	0	0	0	5.91	7

== Awards and honors ==
All-Star Game

- Ray Culp, reserve

== Farm system ==
Level	Team	League	Manager
AAA	Arkansas Travelers	International League	Frank Lucchesi
AA	Chattanooga Lookouts	Sally League	Jack Phillips
A	Bakersfield Bears	California League	Bob Wellman
A	Miami Marlins	Florida State League	Andy Seminick
A	Magic Valley Cowboys	Pioneer League	Moose Johnson
A	Spartanburg Phillies	Western Carolinas League	Lou Kahn
