= Major League Baseball on television in the 1960s =

Sports broadcasting

In 1960, ABC returned to baseball broadcasting with a series of late-afternoon Saturday games. Jack Buck and Carl Erskine were the lead announcing crew for this series, which lasted one season. ABC typically did three games a week. Two of the games were always from the Eastern or Central Time Zone. The late games (no doubleheaders) were usually San Francisco Giants or Los Angeles Dodgers' home games. However, the Milwaukee Braves used to start many of their Saturday home games late in the afternoon. So if the Giants and Dodgers were both the road at the same time, ABC still would be able to show a late game.

== Year-by-year breakdown ==
=== 1960 ===
In 1957, NBC started airing weekend Game of the Week telecasts (Sunday telecasts were added in 1959) with Lindsey Nelson and Leo Durocher calling the action. During this period, NBC (as rival CBS had the rights to broadcast at least eight teams) typically broadcast from Pittsburgh's Forbes Field, Chicago's Wrigley Field or Milwaukee's County Stadium. NBC purchased the rights to 11 Milwaukee Braves games, 11 Pittsburgh Pirates games, two Washington Senators games, and two Chicago Cubs games. Leo Durocher was succeeded as color commentator by Fred Haney in 1960, and Joe Garagiola in 1961, while Bob Wolff replaced Nelson on play-by-play in 1962.

From 1958 to 1960, NBC aired a special regional feed of its games in the southeast, where the network had a different sponsor (such as National Bohemian beer) than for the rest of the country. This feed featured its own announcing team, with Chuck Thompson calling the games with Bill Veeck (1958) and Al Rosen (1959–60). NBC never had a true backup game until 1966, when the network got exclusivity for the Game of the Week. In the process, NBC brought in Curt Gowdy and Pee Wee Reese for the primary game, and Jim Simpson and Tony Kubek for the alternate game (which was always shown in the markets of teams playing in the primary game).

Jack Whitaker and Frankie Frisch announced the backup games on CBS from 1959 to 1961. They usually did games that took place in Philadelphia, New York City, Washington, D.C. or Baltimore. Whitaker once said in three years, he would only broadcast three innings because CBS would not switch away from Dizzy Dean. However, he said that he learned a lot of baseball just sitting next to Frisch. CBS had other backup crews for games featuring the Chicago Cubs and White Sox, Cleveland Indians and Cincinnati Reds. In these cases, Bob Finnegan would handle the play-by-play duties with various analysts depending on the city. CBS did not have Game of the Week rights from any other ballparks in those years.

Pee Wee Reese replaced Blattner as Dean's partner in 1960. That year, Jerry Coleman hosted the pregame show for CBS' Game of the Week broadcasts. A rather embarrassing incident for Coleman occurred when he was interviewing Cookie Lavagetto when the "Star-Spangled Banner" started. Coleman later said, "Believe me, when the Anthem starts, I stop, whether I'm taping, talking, or eating a banana."

=== 1961 ===
One other note about ABC baseball coverage during this period. Despite temporarily losing the Game of the Week package in 1961, ABC still televised several games in prime time (with Jack Buck returning to call the action). This occurred as Roger Maris was poised to tie and subsequently break Babe Ruth's regular season home run record of 60. As with all Major League Baseball games in those days, the action was totally blacked out of major league markets. As a matter of fact, as documented in the HBO film 61*, the Maris family was welcomed into ABC's Kansas City, Missouri affiliate KMBC-TV so they could watch the in-house feed of the game, which was blacked out of Kansas City.

=== 1962 ===
In 1962, CBS dropped the Sunday baseball Game of the Week once the NFL season started, dropping the option clause for affiliates to carry baseball or football in place since 1957.

=== 1963 ===
In 1963 and 1964, viewers in San Francisco were unable to see certain baseball telecasts aired by CBS on KPIX-TV locally, although the games aired on stations in markets adjacent to the Bay Area. In 1963, KPIX pre-empted the July 13 game between the San Francisco Giants–Philadelphia Phillies (at 10:15 a.m.), and the Los Angeles Dodgers-Phillies game on July 14 (at 9:30 a.m.); in 1964, the station pre-empted the Kansas City Athletics–New York Yankees game on May 16 (at 10:45) and the Milwaukee Braves–St. Louis Cardinals game on May 17. All four games did air on NBC affiliate KSBW in Salinas, KXTV in Sacramento and ABC affiliate KHSL-TV in Chico (the games also aired on KOLO-TV in Reno, Nevada, however it joined the two July 1963 games in progress, at 10:25 and 9:55 a.m. on the respective dates).

=== 1964 ===
By 1964, CBS' Dean and Reese called games from Yankee Stadium, Wrigley Field, St. Louis, Philadelphia and Baltimore. The New York Yankees got a $550,000 share of CBS' $895,000. Six clubs that exclusively played nationally televised games on NBC were paid $1.2 million. The theme music used on the CBS telecasts during this era was a Dixieland styled rendition of "Take Me Out to the Ballgame".

On July 17, 1964, a game out of Los Angeles between the Chicago Cubs and Los Angeles Dodgers contest became the first Pay TV baseball game. Subscription television offered the cablecast to subscribers for money. (The Dodgers beat the Cubs by the score of 3–2, with Don Drysdale collecting 10 strikeouts.)

=== 1965 ===
In 1965, ABC provided the first-ever nationwide baseball coverage with weekly Saturday broadcasts on a regional basis. ABC paid $5.7 million for the rights to the 28 Saturday/holiday Games of the Week. ABC's deal covered all of the teams except the New York Yankees and Philadelphia Phillies (who had their own television deals) and called for two regionalized games on Saturdays, Independence Day, and Labor Day. Each Saturday, ABC broadcast two 2 p.m. games and one 5 p.m. game for the Pacific Time Zone. ABC blacked out the games in the home cities of the clubs playing those games. Major League Baseball however, had a TV deal with NBC for the All-Star Game and World Series. At the end of the season, ABC declined to exercise its $6.5 million option for 1966, citing poor ratings, especially in New York.

According to ABC announcer Merle Harmon's profile in Curt Smith's book Voices of Summer, in 1965, CBS' Yankee Game of the Week beat ABC in the ratings in at least Dallas and Des Moines. To make matters worse, local television split the big-city audience. Therefore, ABC could show the Cubs vs. the Cardinals in the New York market, yet the Mets would still kill them in terms of viewership. Harmon, Chris Schenkel, Keith Jackson, and (on occasion) Ken Coleman served as ABC's principal play-by-play voices for this series. Also on the network's announcing team were pregame host Howard Cosell and color commentators Leo Durocher, Tommy Henrich, Warren Spahn (who worked with Chris Schenkel on a July 17 Baltimore-Detroit contest), and Hall of Fame Brooklyn Dodger great Jackie Robinson (who, on April 17, 1965, became the first black network broadcaster for Major League Baseball). According to ABC Sports producer Chuck Howard, "(Robinson) had a high, stabbing voice, great presence, and sharp mind. All he lacked was time."

=== 1966 ===
The New York Yankees, which, the year before, had played 21 Games of the Week for CBS, joined NBC's package in 1966. The new package under NBC called for 28 games, as compared to the 123 combined among three networks during the 1960s. On October 19, 1966, NBC signed a three-year contract with Major League Baseball. As previously mentioned, the year before, Major League Baseball sold an exclusive league-wide television package for the rights to the Saturday-Sunday Game of the Week to ABC. NBC covered only the All-Star Game and World Series in 1965. In addition, a previous deal limited CBS to covering only twelve weekends when its new subsidiary, the New York Yankees, played at home. As previously mentioned, before 1965, NBC aired a slate of Saturday afternoon games beginning in 1957.

Under the new deal, NBC paid roughly US$6 million per year for the 25 Games of the Week, $6.1 million for the 1967 World Series and All-Star Game, and $6.5 million for the 1968 World Series and 1968 All-Star Game. This brought the total value of the contract (which included three Monday night telecasts such as a Labor Day 1966 contest between the San Francisco Giants and Los Angeles Dodgers) up to $30.6 million.

On April 16, 1966, in New York City, about 50 baseball, network, and advertising officials discussed NBC's first year with the Game of the Week. New York could not get a primary match-up between the Detroit Tigers and New York Yankees with Curt Gowdy and Pee Wee Reese calling the action because of local blackout rules. Instead, that market received a backup game (or "'B' game") featuring Tony Kubek and Jim Simpson calling a game between the Cincinnati Reds and Chicago Cubs. That rule would be eliminated after the 1983 season.

In replacing CBS, NBC traded a circus for a seminar. Reese said "Curt Gowdy was its guy (1966–75), and didn't want Dizzy Dean – too overpowering. Curt was nice, but worried about mistakes. Diz and I just laughed." Falstaff Brewery hyped Dean as Gowdy in return said "I said, 'I can't do "Wabash Cannonball." Our styles clash --" then came Pee Wee Reese. Gowdy added by saying about the pairing between him and Reese, "They figured he was fine with me, and they'd still have their boy." To many, baseball meant CBS's 1955–64 Game of the Week thoroughbred. A year later, NBC bought ABC's variant of a mule so to speak. "We had the Series and All-Star Game. 1966–1968's Game meant exclusivity", said NBC Sports head Carl Lindemann, who added that "[Colleague] Chet Simmons and liked him [Gowdy] with the Sox and football" also, getting two network sports for the price of one. As his analyst, Gowdy wanted his friend Ted Williams. NBC's lead sponsor, Chrysler declined the idea when Williams, a Sears spokesman, was pictured putting stuff in a Ford truck.

Before 1966, local announcers exclusively called the World Series. Typically, the Gillette Company, the Commissioner of Baseball and NBC television would choose the announcers, who would represent each of the teams that were in the World Series for the respective year. For the 1966 World Series, Curt Gowdy called half of each game before ceding the microphone to Vin Scully in Los Angeles, and Chuck Thompson in Baltimore. Scully was not satisfied with the arrangement as he said "What about the road? My fans won't be able to hear me." In Game 1 of the 1966 World Series, Scully called the first 4 1/2 innings. When Gowdy inherited the announcing reins, Scully was so upset that he refused to say another word.

As previously mentioned, before 1966, NBC typically paired the top announcers for the respective World Series teams to alternate play-by-play during each game's telecast. For example, if the Yankees played the Dodgers in the World Series, Mel Allen (representing the Yankees) would call half the game and Vin Scully (representing the Dodgers) would call the other half of the game. However, in 1966, NBC wanted its regular network announcer, Curt Gowdy, to call most of the play-by-play at the expense of the top local announcers. So instead of calling half of every World Series game on television (as Vin Scully had done in 1953, 1955, 1956, 1959, 1963 and 1965) they would only get to call half of all home games on TV, providing color commentary while Gowdy called play-by-play for the remaining half of each game. The visiting teams' announcers would participate in the NBC Radio broadcasts. In broadcasts of Series-clinching (or potentially Series-clinching) games on both media, NBC would send the announcer for whichever team was ahead in the game to that team's clubhouse in the ninth inning in order to help cover the trophy presentation and conduct postgame interviews.

=== 1967 ===
In 1967, main Game of the Week broadcasts were blacked-out in the cities of the two participating teams. In some cases, those games were aired by way of the teams' respective local flagship stations, with their local announcing crews – for example, the May 27, Dodgers–Giants contest in San Francisco was not carried by either KRON-TV in the originating city or KNBC in Los Angeles. The game was, however, telecast in Los Angeles over the Dodgers' flagship station KTTV, with Jerry Doggett and Vin Scully providing play-by-play. At the time, Dodgers' broadcasts over KTTV were limited to road games in San Francisco. Conversely the Giants' broadcast partner, KTVU, did not broadcast the team's home games in 1967. Viewers in the San Francisco Bay Area may have been able to view this game on one of two NBC affiliates from nearby areas, KSBW-TV in Salinas and KCRA-TV in Sacramento, California.

=== 1968 ===
The June 8, 1968 Game of the Week broadcast was cancelled due to coverage of the funeral/burial of Robert F. Kennedy. Cleveland at Detroit and Atlanta at Chicago Cubs were the games scheduled to air on that date. Both games were canceled as well, due to Kennedy assassination.

Tony Kubek initially had trouble adjusting to the world of broadcasting. Although he had a lot to say, he was gangling, he tended to stutter, and he talked too fast. Curt Gowdy soon suggested to Kubek that he should work in the off-season to improve his delivery. Kubek bought a tape recorder and took to reading poetry aloud for 20 minutes a day. In 1968, Kubek wowed as a World Series field reporter. Pee Wee Reese, who was soon fired by NBC (and replaced by Kubek as the top analyst) said of Kubek "He wormed his way around, but I wasn't bitter. I just think if you don't have anything to say, you should shut your mouth."

=== 1969 ===
In the early years of the League Championship Series, NBC typically televised a doubleheader on the opening Saturday, followed by a single game on Sunday (because of NFL coverage). They then covered the weekday games with a 1.5 hour overlap, joining the second game in progress when the first one ended. NBC usually swapped announcer crews after Game 2. From 1969 to 1983, the Major League Baseball television contract allowed a local TV station in the market of each competing team to also carry the LCS games. So in 1969, for example, Mets fans in New York could choose to watch either the NBC telecast or Lindsey Nelson, Bob Murphy and Ralph Kiner on WOR-TV.

Games 3, 4, and 5 of the 1969 World Series are believed to be the oldest surviving color television broadcasts of World Series games (even though World Series telecasts have aired in color since 1955). However, they were "truck feeds" in that they do not contain the original commercials, but show a static image of the Shea Stadium field between innings. Games 1 and 2 were saved only as black-and-white kinescopes provided by the CBC. CBC also preserved all seven games of the 1965 and 1968 World Series (plus the 1968 All-Star Game) in black-and-white kinescope.
