= 1963 Milwaukee Braves season =

1963 Milwaukee Braves
- League: National League
- Ballpark: Milwaukee County Stadium
- City: Milwaukee, Wisconsin
- Record: 84–78 (.519)
- League place: 6th
- Owners: William Bartholomay (chairman)
- General managers: John McHale
- Managers: Bobby Bragan
- Television: WTMJ-TV (Mike Walden, Blaine Walsh)
- Radio: WEMP (Earl Gillespie, Tom Collins)

The 1963 Milwaukee Braves season was the 11th in Milwaukee and the 93rd overall season of the franchise.

The sixth-place Braves finished the season with an 84–78 (.519) record, fifteen games behind the National League and World Series champion Los Angeles Dodgers. The season's home attendance was 773,018, ninth in the ten-team National League. This was the first season that the players last names appeared on the jerseys.

== Offseason ==
- October 11, 1962: Ron Hunt was purchased from the Braves by the New York Mets.
- November 26, 1962: Ellis Burton was drafted from the Braves by the Houston Colt .45s in the 1962 rule 5 draft.
- November 26, 1962: 1962 first-year draft
  - Hal Haydel was drafted from the Braves by the Houston Colt .45s.
  - Don Taussig was drafted by the Braves from the Houston Colt .45s.
- November 30, 1962: Jim Bolger, Don Nottebart, and Connie Grob were traded by the Braves to the Houston Colt .45s for Norm Larker.
- Prior to 1963 season: Lou Klimchock was acquired from the Braves by the Washington Senators.

== Ownership change and managerial turnover ==
On November 16, 1962, the 17-year tenure of Louis Perini as owner of the Braves ended when the Boston construction magnate sold the team to a Chicago-based group of investors led by William Bartholomay. The Braves' home attendance had been declining since its 1957 high-water mark of over 2.2 million fans to 767,000 in five short years, due to a drop-off in on-field success since its last postseason appearance (the 1959 NL playoff) and a ban on "bringing your own" food and beer to County Stadium. Within two years of buying the Braves, the Bartholomay group would be negotiating with Atlanta, in a successful bid to move the club to the Southeast as early as 1965.

The change in owners overshadowed the Braves' continued turbulence in the managerial chair. On October 5, 1962, Birdie Tebbetts, in office for only 13 months, resigned to join the Cleveland Indians in the American League. His successor, Bobby Bragan, 45, was the team's fourth manager in five seasons. He had been a coach with the expansion Houston Colt .45s in 1962 and had previously been fired from managing posts with the Pittsburgh Pirates (1956–1957) and the Indians (1958).

In a 1976 memoir, longtime Dodger executive Harold Parrott would claim that the Braves' hiring of Bragan after the 1962 season was orchestrated by Branch Rickey to thwart a plan by Dodger owner Walter O'Malley to replace his manager, eventual Hall of Famer Walter Alston, with Leo Durocher. O'Malley was strongly considering firing Alston, but only if he could find a suitable "soft landing spot" for him. He chose the Braves, looking to replace Tebbetts, as Alston's ideal destination. But, according to Parrott, Rickey—in semi-retirement but still O'Malley's bitter enemy—discovered the scheme and brokered the marriage between Bragan and the Braves' ownership before O'Malley's plan could materialize. Bragan served as the Braves' last manager in Milwaukee in 1965, and their first in Atlanta in 1966, although he was fired on August 9 of that year, after guiding the team to an overall record of 310–287 (.519) in over 3 1/2 seasons.

== Regular season ==
- April 16, 1963: Eddie Mathews hit the 400th home run of his career. Along with Duke Snider, Mathews became part of the first duo to reach the 400 plateau in the same season.

=== Season standings ===
National League
Team	W	L	Pct.	GB	Home	Road
Los Angeles Dodgers	99	63	.611	—	50‍–‍31	49‍–‍32
St. Louis Cardinals	93	69	.574	6	53‍–‍28	40‍–‍41
San Francisco Giants	88	74	.543	11	50‍–‍31	38‍–‍43
Philadelphia Phillies	87	75	.537	12	45‍–‍36	42‍–‍39
Cincinnati Reds	86	76	.531	13	46‍–‍35	40‍–‍41
Milwaukee Braves	84	78	.519	15	45‍–‍36	39‍–‍42
Chicago Cubs	82	80	.506	17	43‍–‍38	39‍–‍42
Pittsburgh Pirates	74	88	.457	25	42‍–‍39	32‍–‍49
Houston Colt .45s	66	96	.407	33	44‍–‍37	22‍–‍59
New York Mets	51	111	.315	48	34‍–‍47	17‍–‍64

=== Record vs. opponents ===
1963 National League record Sources:
Team	CHC	CIN	HOU	LAD	MIL	NYM	PHI	PIT	SF	STL
Chicago	—	9–9	9–9	7–11	12–6	11–7	9–9	8–10	10–8	7–11
Cincinnati	9–9	—	11–7	8–10	10–8	10–8	8–10	11–7	8–10	11–7
Houston	9–9	7–11	—	5–13	5–13	13–5	8–10	6–12	8–10	5–13
Los Angeles	11–7	10–8	13–5	—	8–10–1	16–2	7–11	13–5	9–9	12–6
Milwaukee	6–12	8–10	13–5	10–8–1	—	12–6	10–8	7–11	10–8	8–10
New York	7–11	8–10	5–13	2–16	6–12	—	8–10	4–14	6–12	5–13
Philadelphia	9–9	10–8	10–8	11–7	8–10	10–8	—	13–5	8–10	8–10
Pittsburgh	10–8	7–11	12–6	5–13	11–7	14–4	5–13	—	5–13	5–13
San Francisco	8–10	10–8	10–8	9–9	8–10	12–6	10–8	13–5	—	8–10
St. Louis	11–7	7–11	13–5	6–12	10–8	13–5	10–8	13–5	10–8	—

=== Notable transactions ===
- May 6, 1963: Lou Klimchock was returned to the Braves by the Washington Senators.
- May 8, 1963: Lou Johnson and cash were traded by the Braves to the Detroit Tigers for Chico Fernández.
- May 8, 1963: Chico Fernández was traded by the Braves to the New York Mets for Larry Foss.
- August 8, 1963: Norm Larker was purchased from the Braves by the San Francisco Giants.

=== Roster ===
1963 Milwaukee Braves
Roster
Pitchers: 22 Wade Blasingame; 33 Lew Burdette; 40 Tony Cloninger; 34 Hank Fischer; 32 Frank Funk; 36 Bob Hendley; 23 Denny Lemaster; 38 Ron Piché; 35 Claude Raymond; 37 Bob Sadowski; 25 Dan Schneider; 26 Bob Shaw; 21 Warren Spahn; 18 Bobby Tiefenauer	Catchers: 1 Del Crandall; 15 Joe Torre; 8 Bob Uecker; Infielders: 28 Tommie Aaron; 2 Frank Bolling; 16 Lou Klimchock; 9 Norm Larker; 41 Eddie Mathews; 11 Roy McMillan; 19 Denis Menke; 12 Gene Oliver; 27 Amado Samuel; 14 Woody Woodward	Outfielders: 44 Hank Aaron; 31 Ty Cline; 42 Don Dillard; 43 Len Gabrielson; 30 Mack Jones; 24 Lee Maye; 31 Bubba Morton; 29 Hawk Taylor; Other batters: 20 Gus Bell; 7 Rico Carty	Manager: 10 Bobby Bragan; Coaches: 3 Ken Silvestri; 6 Dixie Walker; 4 Jo-Jo White; 5 Whit Wyatt

== Player stats ==
=== Batting ===
==== Starters by position ====
Note: Pos = Position; G = Games played; AB = At bats; H = Hits; Avg. = Batting average; HR = Home runs; RBI = Runs batted in

Pos	Player	G	AB	H	Avg.	HR	RBI
C	Joe Torre	142	501	147	.293	14	71
1B	Gene Oliver	95	296	74	.250	11	47
2B	Frank Bolling	142	542	132	.244	5	43
SS	Roy McMillan	100	320	80	.250	4	29
3B	Eddie Mathews	158	547	144	.263	23	84
LF	Don Dillard	67	119	28	.235	1	12
CF	Lee Maye	124	442	120	.271	11	34
RF	Hank Aaron	161	631	201	.319	44	130

==== Other batters ====
Note: G = Games played; AB = At bats; H = Hits; Avg. = Batting average; HR = Home runs; RBI = Runs batted in

Player	G	AB	H	Avg.	HR	RBI
Denis Menke	146	518	121	.234	11	50
Del Crandall	86	259	52	.201	3	28
Mack Jones	93	228	50	.219	3	22
Ty Cline	72	174	41	.236	0	10
Norm Larker	64	147	26	.177	1	14
Tommie Aaron	72	135	27	.200	1	15
Len Gabrielson	46	120	26	.217	3	15
Lou Klimchock	24	46	9	.196	0	1
Hawk Taylor	16	29	2	.069	0	0
Bubba Morton	15	28	5	.179	0	4
Amado Samuel	15	17	3	.176	0	0
Bob Uecker	13	16	4	.250	0	0
Gus Bell	3	3	1	.333	0	0
Woody Woodward	10	2	0	.000	0	0
Rico Carty	2	2	0	.000	0	0

=== Pitching ===
==== Starting pitchers ====
Note: G = Games pitched; IP = Innings pitched; W = Wins; L = Losses; ERA = Earned run average; SO = Strikeouts

Player	G	IP	W	L	ERA	SO
Warren Spahn	33	259.2	23	7	2.60	102
Denny Lemaster	46	237.0	11	14	3.04	190
Bob Sadowski	19	116.2	5	7	2.62	72
Lew Burdette	15	84.0	6	5	3.64	28

==== Other pitchers ====
Note: G = Games pitched; IP = Innings pitched; W = Wins; L = Losses; ERA = Earned run average; SO = Strikeouts

Player	G	IP	W	L	ERA	SO
Bob Hendley	41	169.1	9	9	3.93	105
Bob Shaw	48	159.0	7	11	2.66	105
Tony Cloninger	41	145.1	9	11	3.78	100
Hank Fischer	31	74.1	4	3	4.96	72

==== Relief pitchers ====
Note: G = Games pitched; W = Wins; L = Losses; SV = Saves; ERA = Earned run average; SO = Strikeouts

Player	G	W	L	SV	ERA	SO
Claude Raymond	45	4	6	5	5.40	44
Ron Piché	37	1	1	0	3.40	40
Dan Schneider	30	1	0	0	3.09	19
Frank Funk	25	3	3	0	2.68	19
Bobby Tiefenauer	12	1	1	2	1.21	22
Wade Blasingame	2	0	0	0	12.00	6

== Awards and honors ==
All-Star Game

- Hank Aaron, outfield, starter
- Warren Spahn, reserve
- Joe Torre, reserve

== Farm system ==
Level	Team	League	Manager
AAA	Toronto Maple Leafs	International League	Bill Adair
AAA	Denver Bears	Pacific Coast League	Jack Tighe
AA	Austin Senators	Texas League	Jimmy Brown
A	Waycross Braves	Georgia–Florida League	Bill Steinecke
A	Yakima Bears	Northwest League	Buddy Hicks
A	Boise Braves	Pioneer League	Billy Smith
A	Greenville Braves	Western Carolinas League	Jim Fanning and Paul Snyder

LEAGUE CHAMPIONS: Yakima, Greenville
