= 1963 Cincinnati Reds season =

1963 Cincinnati Reds
- League: National League
- Ballpark: Crosley Field
- City: Cincinnati
- Owners: Bill DeWitt
- General managers: Bill DeWitt
- Managers: Fred Hutchinson
- Television: WLWT (Ed Kennedy, Frank McCormick)
- Radio: WKRC (Waite Hoyt, Gene Kelly)

The 1963 Cincinnati Reds season consisted of the Cincinnati Reds finishing in fifth place in the National League with a record of 86–76, 13 games behind the NL and World Series Champion Los Angeles Dodgers. The Reds were managed by Fred Hutchinson and played their home games at Crosley Field.

== Offseason ==
- November 26, 1962: Brant Alyea was drafted from the Reds by the Washington Senators in the 1962 first-year draft.
- January 24, 1963: Don Zimmer was traded by the Reds to the Los Angeles Dodgers for Scott Breeden (minors).
- Prior to 1963 season: Stan Swanson was signed as an amateur free agent by the Reds.

== Regular season ==
1963 was Pete Rose's rookie season. He made his major league debut on Opening Day, April 8, against the Pittsburgh Pirates. He had three at bats without a hit, but did draw a walk. Rose started his career 0-for-11 before getting his first major league hit on April 13, a triple off Pittsburgh's Bob Friend.

=== Season standings ===
National League
Team	W	L	Pct.	GB	Home	Road
Los Angeles Dodgers	99	63	.611	—	50‍–‍31	49‍–‍32
St. Louis Cardinals	93	69	.574	6	53‍–‍28	40‍–‍41
San Francisco Giants	88	74	.543	11	50‍–‍31	38‍–‍43
Philadelphia Phillies	87	75	.537	12	45‍–‍36	42‍–‍39
Cincinnati Reds	86	76	.531	13	46‍–‍35	40‍–‍41
Milwaukee Braves	84	78	.519	15	45‍–‍36	39‍–‍42
Chicago Cubs	82	80	.506	17	43‍–‍38	39‍–‍42
Pittsburgh Pirates	74	88	.457	25	42‍–‍39	32‍–‍49
Houston Colt .45s	66	96	.407	33	44‍–‍37	22‍–‍59
New York Mets	51	111	.315	48	34‍–‍47	17‍–‍64

=== Record vs. opponents ===
1963 National League record Sources:
Team	CHC	CIN	HOU	LAD	MIL	NYM	PHI	PIT	SF	STL
Chicago	—	9–9	9–9	7–11	12–6	11–7	9–9	8–10	10–8	7–11
Cincinnati	9–9	—	11–7	8–10	10–8	10–8	8–10	11–7	8–10	11–7
Houston	9–9	7–11	—	5–13	5–13	13–5	8–10	6–12	8–10	5–13
Los Angeles	11–7	10–8	13–5	—	8–10–1	16–2	7–11	13–5	9–9	12–6
Milwaukee	6–12	8–10	13–5	10–8–1	—	12–6	10–8	7–11	10–8	8–10
New York	7–11	8–10	5–13	2–16	6–12	—	8–10	4–14	6–12	5–13
Philadelphia	9–9	10–8	10–8	11–7	8–10	10–8	—	13–5	8–10	8–10
Pittsburgh	10–8	7–11	12–6	5–13	11–7	14–4	5–13	—	5–13	5–13
San Francisco	8–10	10–8	10–8	9–9	8–10	12–6	10–8	13–5	—	8–10
St. Louis	11–7	7–11	13–5	6–12	10–8	13–5	10–8	13–5	10–8	—

=== Notable transactions ===
- May 5, 1963: Jim Brosnan was traded by the Reds to the Chicago White Sox for Dom Zanni.
- July 1, 1963: Jesse Gonder was traded by the Reds to the New York Mets for Charlie Neal and Sammy Taylor.

=== Roster ===
1963 Cincinnati Reds
Roster
Pitchers: 42 Jim Brosnan; 47 Jim Coates; 44 Bill Henry; 30 Joey Jay; 46 Jim Maloney; 41 Joe Nuxhall; 31 Jim O'Toole; 48 Jim Owens; 37 Bob Purkey; 38 John Tsitouris; 33 Al Worthington; 43 Dom Zanni	Catchers: 6 Johnny Edwards; 9 Hank Foiles; 7 Jesse Gonder; 9 Gene Green; 7 Sammy Taylor; Infielders: 19 Don Blasingame; 11 Harry Bright; 16 Leo Cárdenas; 18 Gordy Coleman; 12 Gene Freese; 10 Eddie Kasko; 25 Marty Keough; 19 Charlie Neal; 8 Don Pavletich; 14 Pete Rose; 9 Daryl Spencer	Outfielders: 17 Tommy Harper; 24 Jerry Lynch; 28 Vada Pinson; 29 Wally Post; 20 Frank Robinson; 24 Bob Skinner; 21 Ken Walters	Manager: 1 Fred Hutchinson; Coaches: 4 Reggie Otero; 36 Ray Shore; 2 Dick Sisler; 3 Jim Turner

== Player stats ==
=== Batting ===
==== Starters by position ====
Note: Pos = Position; G = Games played; AB = At bats; H = Hits; Avg. = Batting average; HR = Home runs; RBI = Runs batted in

Pos	Player	G	AB	H	Avg.	HR	RBI
C	Johnny Edwards	148	495	128	.259	11	67
1B	Gordy Coleman	123	365	90	.247	14	59
2B	Pete Rose	157	623	170	.273	6	41
SS	Leo Cárdenas	158	565	133	.235	7	48
3B	Gene Freese	66	217	53	.244	6	26
LF	Frank Robinson	140	482	125	.259	21	91
CF	Vada Pinson	162	652	204	.313	22	106
RF	Tommy Harper	129	408	106	.260	10	37

==== Other batters ====
Note: G = Games played; AB = At bats; H = Hits; Avg. = Batting average; HR = Home runs; RBI = Runs batted in

Player	G	AB	H	Avg.	HR	RBI
Eddie Kasko	76	199	48	.241	3	10
Bob Skinner	72	194	49	.253	3	17
Don Pavletich	71	183	38	.208	5	18
Marty Keough	95	172	39	.227	6	21
Daryl Spencer	50	155	37	.239	1	23
Ken Walters	49	75	14	.187	1	7
Charlie Neal	34	64	10	.156	0	3
Jesse Gonder	31	32	10	.313	3	5
Jerry Lynch	22	32	8	.250	2	9
Don Blasingame	18	31	5	.161	0	0
Gene Green	15	31	7	.226	1	3
Wally Post	5	7	0	.000	0	0
Sammy Taylor	3	6	0	.000	0	0
Hank Foiles	1	3	0	.000	0	0
Harry Bright	1	1	0	.000	0	0

=== Pitching ===
==== Starting pitchers ====
Note: G = Games pitched; IP = Innings pitched; W = Wins; L = Losses; ERA = Earned run average; SO = Strikeouts

Player	G	IP	W	L	ERA	SO
Jim Maloney	33	250.1	23	7	2.77	265
Jim O'Toole	33	234.1	17	14	2.88	146
Joe Nuxhall	35	217.1	15	8	2.61	169
John Tsitouris	30	191.0	12	8	3.16	113
Joey Jay	30	170.0	7	18	4.29	116
Bob Purkey	21	137.0	6	10	3.55	55

==== Other pitchers ====
Note: G = Games pitched; IP = Innings pitched; W = Wins; L = Losses; ERA = Earned run average; SO = Strikeouts

Player	G	IP	W	L	ERA	SO
Jim Owens	19	42.1	0	2	5.31	29

==== Relief pitchers ====
Note: G = Games pitched; W = Wins; L = Losses; SV = Saves; ERA = Earned run average; SO = Strikeouts

Player	G	W	L	SV	ERA	SO
Bill Henry	47	1	3	14	4.15	45
Al Worthington	50	4	4	10	2.99	55
Dom Zanni	31	1	1	5	4.19	40
Jim Coates	9	0	0	0	5.51	11
Jim Brosnan	6	0	1	0	7.71	4

== Awards and honors ==
Rookie of the Year Award

- Pete Rose

Gold Glove Award

- Johnny Edwards, catcher

=== All-Stars ===
All-Star Game

- Jim O'Toole, starter, pitcher
- Johnny Edwards, reserve

== Farm system ==
Level	Team	League	Manager
AAA	San Diego Padres	Pacific Coast League	Don Heffner
AA	Macon Peaches	Sally League	Dave Bristol
A	Rocky Mount Leafs	Carolina League	Red Davis
A	Tampa Tarpons	Florida State League	Hersh Freeman
A	Cedar Rapids Red Raiders	Midwest League	Mike Ryba
