= 1963 Chicago Cubs season =

1963 Chicago Cubs
- League: National League
- Ballpark: Wrigley Field
- City: Chicago
- Record: 82–80 (.506)
- League place: 7th
- Owners: Philip K. Wrigley
- General managers: John Holland
- Managers: Bob Kennedy
- Television: WGN-TV (Jack Brickhouse, Vince Lloyd)
- Radio: WGN (Jack Quinlan, Lou Boudreau)

The 1963 Chicago Cubs season was the 92nd season of the Chicago Cubs franchise, the 88th in the National League, and the 48th at Wrigley Field. The Cubs finished seventh in the National League with a record of 82–80, marking their first winning season since 1946.

== Offseason ==
- October 17, 1962: Don Cardwell, George Altman and Moe Thacker were traded by the Cubs to the St. Louis Cardinals for Larry Jackson, Lindy McDaniel, and Jimmie Schaffer.
- November 26, 1962: Curt Motton was drafted from the Cubs by the Baltimore Orioles in the 1962 minor league draft.
- November 26, 1962: Glenn Beckert was drafted by the Cubs from the Boston Red Sox in the 1962 first-year draft.
- March 28, 1963: Dave Gerard and Danny Murphy were traded by the Cubs to the Houston Colt .45s for Hal Haydel, Dick LeMay and Merritt Ranew.

== Regular season ==
=== Season standings ===
National League
Team	W	L	Pct.	GB	Home	Road
Los Angeles Dodgers	99	63	.611	—	50‍–‍31	49‍–‍32
St. Louis Cardinals	93	69	.574	6	53‍–‍28	40‍–‍41
San Francisco Giants	88	74	.543	11	50‍–‍31	38‍–‍43
Philadelphia Phillies	87	75	.537	12	45‍–‍36	42‍–‍39
Cincinnati Reds	86	76	.531	13	46‍–‍35	40‍–‍41
Milwaukee Braves	84	78	.519	15	45‍–‍36	39‍–‍42
Chicago Cubs	82	80	.506	17	43‍–‍38	39‍–‍42
Pittsburgh Pirates	74	88	.457	25	42‍–‍39	32‍–‍49
Houston Colt .45s	66	96	.407	33	44‍–‍37	22‍–‍59
New York Mets	51	111	.315	48	34‍–‍47	17‍–‍64

=== Record vs. opponents ===
1963 National League record Sources:
Team	CHC	CIN	HOU	LAD	MIL	NYM	PHI	PIT	SF	STL
Chicago	—	9–9	9–9	7–11	12–6	11–7	9–9	8–10	10–8	7–11
Cincinnati	9–9	—	11–7	8–10	10–8	10–8	8–10	11–7	8–10	11–7
Houston	9–9	7–11	—	5–13	5–13	13–5	8–10	6–12	8–10	5–13
Los Angeles	11–7	10–8	13–5	—	8–10–1	16–2	7–11	13–5	9–9	12–6
Milwaukee	6–12	8–10	13–5	10–8–1	—	12–6	10–8	7–11	10–8	8–10
New York	7–11	8–10	5–13	2–16	6–12	—	8–10	4–14	6–12	5–13
Philadelphia	9–9	10–8	10–8	11–7	8–10	10–8	—	13–5	8–10	8–10
Pittsburgh	10–8	7–11	12–6	5–13	11–7	14–4	5–13	—	5–13	5–13
San Francisco	8–10	10–8	10–8	9–9	8–10	12–6	10–8	13–5	—	8–10
St. Louis	11–7	7–11	13–5	6–12	10–8	13–5	10–8	13–5	10–8	—

=== Notable transactions ===
- May 27, 1963: Ellis Burton was purchased by the Cubs from the Cleveland Indians.

=== Roster ===
1963 Chicago Cubs
Roster
Pitchers: 41 Tom Baker; 38 Jim Brewer; 31 Bob Buhl; 42 Freddie Burdette; 37 Dick Ellsworth; 36 Don Elston; 40 Glen Hobbie; 46 Larry Jackson; 34 Cal Koonce; 30 Dick LeMay; 43 Lindy McDaniel; 33 Phil Mudrock; 41 Barney Schultz; 39 Paul Toth; 33 Jack Warner	Catchers: 9 Cuno Barragan; 6 Dick Bertell; 7 Merritt Ranew; 5 Jimmie Schaffer; Infielders: 15 Ken Aspromonte; 14 Ernie Banks; 22 John Boccabella; 17 Steve Boros; 15 Leo Burke; 11 Alex Grammas; 16 Ken Hubbs; 18 Andre Rodgers; 10 Ron Santo; 19 Jimmy Stewart; 28 Bob Will	Outfielders: 24 Lou Brock; 21 Ellis Burton; 20 Billy Cowan; 27 Don Landrum; 23 Nelson Mathews; 26 Billy Williams	Head coach: 61 Bob Kennedy; Coaches College of Coaches

== Player stats ==
= Indicates team leader

=== Batting ===
==== Starters by position ====
Note: Pos = Position; G = Games played; AB = At bats; H = Hits; Avg. = Batting average; HR = Home runs; RBI = Runs batted in

Pos	Player	G	AB	H	Avg.	HR	RBI
C	Dick Bertell	100	322	75	.233	2	14
1B	Ernie Banks	130	432	98	.227	18	64
2B	Ken Hubbs	154	566	133	.235	8	47
SS	Andre Rodgers	150	516	118	.229	5	33
3B	Ron Santo	162	630	187	.297	25	99
LF	Billy Williams	161	612	175	.286	25	95
CF	Ellis Burton	93	322	74	.230	12	41
RF	Lou Brock	148	547	141	.258	9	37

==== Other batters ====
Note: G = Games played; AB = At bats; H = Hits; Avg. = Batting average; HR = Home runs; RBI = Runs batted in

Player	G	AB	H	Avg.	HR	RBI
Don Landrum	84	227	55	.242	1	10
Nelson Mathews	61	155	24	.155	4	10
Merritt Ranew	78	154	52	.338	3	15
Jimmie Schaffer	57	142	34	.239	7	19
Steve Boros	41	90	19	.211	3	7
John Boccabella	24	74	14	.189	1	5
Leo Burke	27	49	9	.184	2	7
Jimmy Stewart	13	37	11	.297	0	1
Billy Cowan	14	36	9	.250	1	2
Ken Aspromonte	20	34	5	.147	0	4
Alex Grammas	16	27	5	.185	0	0
Bob Will	23	23	4	.174	0	1
Cuno Barragan	1	1	0	.000	0	0

=== Pitching ===
= Indicates team leader

= Indicates league leader

==== Starting pitchers ====
Note: G = Games pitched; IP = Innings pitched; W = Wins; L = Losses; ERA = Earned run average; SO = Strikeouts

Player	G	IP	W	L	ERA	SO
Dick Ellsworth	37	290.2	22	10	2.11	185
Larry Jackson	37	275.0	14	18	2.55	153
Bob Buhl	37	226.0	11	14	3.38	108

==== Other pitchers ====
Note: G = Games pitched; IP = Innings pitched; W = Wins; L = Losses; ERA = Earned run average; SO = Strikeouts

Player	G	IP	W	L	ERA	SO
Glen Hobbie	36	165.1	7	10	3.92	94
Paul Toth	27	130.2	5	9	3.10	66
Cal Koonce	21	72.2	2	6	4.58	44

==== Relief pitchers ====
Note: G = Games pitched; W = Wins; L = Losses; SV = Saves; ERA = Earned run average; SO = Strikeouts

Player	G	W	L	SV	ERA	SO
Lindy McDaniel	57	13	7	22	2.86	75
Don Elston	51	4	1	4	2.83	41
Jim Brewer	29	3	2	0	4.89	35
Barney Schultz	15	1	0	2	3.62	18
Tom Baker	10	0	1	0	3.00	14
Dick LeMay	9	0	1	0	5.28	10
Jack Warner	8	0	1	0	2.78	7
Freddie Burdette	4	0	0	0	3.86	1
Phil Mudrock	1	0	0	0	9.00	0

== Awards and honors ==
All-Star Game

- Larry Jackson, reserve
- Ron Santo, reserve

== Farm system ==
Level	Team	League	Manager
AAA	Salt Lake City Bees	Pacific Coast League	El Tappe
AA	Amarillo Gold Sox	Texas League	Joe Macko
A	St. Cloud Rox	Northern League	Walt Dixon
A	Wenatchee Chiefs	Northwest League	George Freese
A	Pocatello Chiefs	Pioneer League	Frank Calo
Rookie	Middlesboro Cubsox	Appalachian League	Ripper Collins, Hugh Mulcahy and George Noga

Middlesboro affiliation shared with Chicago White Sox
