= 1963 Pittsburgh Pirates season =

1963 Pittsburgh Pirates
- League: National League
- Ballpark: Forbes Field
- City: Pittsburgh, Pennsylvania
- Owners: John W. Galbreath (majority shareholder); Bing Crosby, Thomas P. Johnson (minority shareholders)
- General managers: Joe L. Brown
- Managers: Danny Murtaugh
- Television: KDKA-TV; Bob Prince, Jim Woods
- Radio: KDKA; Bob Prince, Jim Woods, Claude Haring

The 1963 Pittsburgh Pirates season was the 82nd season of the Pittsburgh Pirates franchise; the 77th in the National League. The Pirates finished eighth in the league standings with a record of 74–88.

== Offseason ==
- November 19, 1962: Dick Groat and Diomedes Olivo were traded by the Pirates to the St. Louis Cardinals for Don Cardwell and Julio Gotay.

== Regular season ==
On April 8, Pete Rose made his major league debut for the Cincinnati Reds in a game against the Pirates. He had three at bats without a hit.

=== Season standings ===
National League
Team	W	L	Pct.	GB	Home	Road
Los Angeles Dodgers	99	63	.611	—	50‍–‍31	49‍–‍32
St. Louis Cardinals	93	69	.574	6	53‍–‍28	40‍–‍41
San Francisco Giants	88	74	.543	11	50‍–‍31	38‍–‍43
Philadelphia Phillies	87	75	.537	12	45‍–‍36	42‍–‍39
Cincinnati Reds	86	76	.531	13	46‍–‍35	40‍–‍41
Milwaukee Braves	84	78	.519	15	45‍–‍36	39‍–‍42
Chicago Cubs	82	80	.506	17	43‍–‍38	39‍–‍42
Pittsburgh Pirates	74	88	.457	25	42‍–‍39	32‍–‍49
Houston Colt .45s	66	96	.407	33	44‍–‍37	22‍–‍59
New York Mets	51	111	.315	48	34‍–‍47	17‍–‍64

=== Record vs. opponents ===
1963 National League record Sources:
Team	CHC	CIN	HOU	LAD	MIL	NYM	PHI	PIT	SF	STL
Chicago	—	9–9	9–9	7–11	12–6	11–7	9–9	8–10	10–8	7–11
Cincinnati	9–9	—	11–7	8–10	10–8	10–8	8–10	11–7	8–10	11–7
Houston	9–9	7–11	—	5–13	5–13	13–5	8–10	6–12	8–10	5–13
Los Angeles	11–7	10–8	13–5	—	8–10–1	16–2	7–11	13–5	9–9	12–6
Milwaukee	6–12	8–10	13–5	10–8–1	—	12–6	10–8	7–11	10–8	8–10
New York	7–11	8–10	5–13	2–16	6–12	—	8–10	4–14	6–12	5–13
Philadelphia	9–9	10–8	10–8	11–7	8–10	10–8	—	13–5	8–10	8–10
Pittsburgh	10–8	7–11	12–6	5–13	11–7	14–4	5–13	—	5–13	5–13
San Francisco	8–10	10–8	10–8	9–9	8–10	12–6	10–8	13–5	—	8–10
St. Louis	11–7	7–11	13–5	6–12	10–8	13–5	10–8	13–5	10–8	—

=== Game log ===
1963 Game Log: 74–88 (Home: 42–39; Away: 32–49)
April: 11–5 (Home: 7–2; Away: 4–3)

#	Date	Opponent	Score	Win	Loss	Save	Attendance	Record
1	April 8	@ Reds	2–5	O'Toole	**Francis** (0–1)	—	28,896	0–1
2	April 9	Braves	3–2	**Face** (1–0)	Hendley	—	29,615	1–1
3	April 10	Braves	3–2	**Cardwell** (1–0)	Shaw	**Veale** (1)	3,601	2–1
4	April 13	@ Reds	12–4	**Friend** (1–0)	O'Toole	—	4,481	3–1
5	April 14	@ Reds	1–0	**McBean** (1–0)	Jay	—	4,864	4–1
6	April 16	@ Cardinals	3–4	Fanok	**Face** (1–1)	—	8,301	4–2
7	April 17	@ Cardinals	3–7	Washburn	**Cardwell** (1–1)	—	7,481	4–3
8	April 18	@ Cardinals	3–2	**Schwall** (1–0)	Olivo	**Face** (1)	6,497	5–3
9	April 20	Reds	4–2	**Friend** (2–0)	Jay	—	12,235	6–3
10	April 21	Reds	3–8	Maloney	**McBean** (1–1)	—	18,070	6–4
11	April 22	Cubs	2–0	**Francis** (1–1)	Hobbie	**Face** (2)	5,289	7–4
12	April 23	Cubs	2–7	Jackson	**Cardwell** (1–2)	—	968	7–5
13	April 24	@ Phillies	6–4	**Friend** (3–0)	Short	**Face** (3)	4,485	8–5
14	April 26	Mets	5–2	**Haddix** (1–0)	Jackson	**Sisk** (1)	10,531	9–5
15	April 27	Mets	2–1	**Gibbon** (1–0)	Hook	—	8,011	10–5
16	April 28	Mets	3–2	**Face** (2–1)	Stallard	—	12,057	11–5

May: 12–17 (Home: 6–7; Away: 6–10)

#	Date	Opponent	Score	Win	Loss	Save	Attendance	Record
17	May 1	Giants	1–5	Sanford	**Friend** (3–1)	—	6,122	11–6
18	May 2	Giants	1–2	Marichal	**Cardwell** (1–3)	—	9,563	11–7
19	May 3	Dodgers	13–2	**McBean** (2–1)	Sherry	—	16,960	12–7
20	May 4	Dodgers	5–0	**Schwall** (2–0)	Miller	—	12,037	13–7
21	May 5	Dodgers	3–7	Perranoski	**Law** (0–1)	—	18,743	13–8
22	May 6	Dodgers	7–4	**Gibbon** (2–0)	Drysdale	**Face** (4)	5,376	14–8
23	May 7	@ Cubs	4–5	Jackson	**Cardwell** (1–4)	—	6,012	14–9
24	May 8	@ Cubs	5–9	Elston	**Face** (2–2)	—	6,350	14–10
25	May 9	@ Cubs	1–3	Ellsworth	**Schwall** (2–1)	—	5,961	14–11
26	May 10	Cardinals	0–1	Simmons	**Friend** (3–2)	—	16,739	14–12
27	May 11	Cardinals	3–2	**Law** (1–1)	Washburn	**Face** (5)	7,743	15–12
28	May 12	Cardinals	1–2 (12)	Taylor	**Face** (2–3)	Shantz		15–13
29	May 12	Cardinals	4–3	**McBean** (3–1)	Sadecki	—	22,280	16–13
30	May 14	@ Giants	1–3	Sanford	**Friend** (3–3)	Bolin	14,847	16–14
31	May 15	@ Giants	3–4	Marichal	**Cardwell** (1–5)	Bolin	10,386	16–15
32	May 16	@ Dodgers	0–1	Podres	**Schwall** (2–2)	—	21,287	16–16
33	May 17	@ Dodgers	3–9	Miller	**Gibbon** (2–1)	Scott	34,216	16–17
34	May 18	@ Dodgers	4–6	Drysdale	**Law** (1–2)	—	21,140	16–18
35	May 19	@ Colt .45s	5–0	**Friend** (4–3)	Farrell	—	8,847	17–18
36	May 20	@ Colt .45s	0–2	Drott	**Cardwell** (1–6)	—	5,281	17–19
37	May 21	@ Colt .45s	6–5	**McBean** (4–1)	Umbricht	**Face** (6)	6,329	18–19
38	May 22	@ Colt .45s	4–3	**Francis** (2–1)	Nottebart	**Face** (7)	5,577	19–19
39	May 24	@ Braves	7–2	**Friend** (5–3)	Spahn	—	7,731	20–19
40	May 25	@ Braves	0–1	Shaw	**Gibbon** (2–2)	—	7,981	20–20
41	May 26	@ Braves	5–2 (11)	**McBean** (5–1)	Funk	**Veale** (2)	9,794	21–20
42	May 28	Phillies	1–5	McLish	**Friend** (5–4)	—	8,497	21–21
43	May 30	Phillies	7–1	**Cardwell** (2–6)	Mahaffey	—		22–21
44	May 30	Phillies	5–6	Culp	**Gibbon** (2–3)	Klippstein	19,039	22–22
45	May 31	@ Mets	2–0	**Schwall** (3–2)	Willey	—	16,236	23–22

June: 13–17 (Home: 7–8; Away: 6–9)

#	Date	Opponent	Score	Win	Loss	Save	Attendance	Record
46	June 1	@ Mets	10–1	**Friend** (6–4)	Cisco	—	11,800	24–22
47	June 2	@ Mets	1–2 (10)	Bearnarth	**Face** (2–4)	—		24–23
48	June 2	@ Mets	3–4 (10)	Hook	**Face** (2–5)	—	18,844	24–24
49	June 5	Reds	5–4	**Veale** (1–0)	Tsitouris	**Haddix** (1)		25–24
50	June 5	Reds	4–3	**Friend** (7–4)	Purkey	**Veale** (3)	11,855	26–24
51	June 6	Reds	5–7	Maloney	**Gibbon** (2–4)	Henry		26–25
52	June 6	Reds	5–10	Jay	**Schwall** (3–3)	—	12,309	26–26
53	June 7	Braves	5–9	Funk	**Haddix** (1–1)	Hendley	15,084	26–27
54	June 8	Braves	6–4	**McBean** (6–1)	Cloninger	—	9,650	27–27
55	June 9	Braves	4–0	**Friend** (8–4)	Lemaster	—		28–27
56	June 9	Braves	3–5	Spahn	**Cardwell** (2–7)	Shaw	18,209	28–28
57	June 11	Cardinals	1–3	Gibson	**Schwall** (3–4)	—	17,098	28–29
58	June 12	@ Reds	0–3	O'Toole	**Francis** (2–2)	—	8,472	28–30
59	June 13	@ Reds	2–4	Tsitouris	**Cardwell** (2–8)	—	7,053	28–31
60	June 14	@ Cardinals	2–5	Sadecki	**Friend** (8–5)	Shantz	20,874	28–32
61	June 16	@ Cardinals	4–3 (12)	**McBean** (7–1)	Bauta	—		29–32
62	June 16	@ Cardinals	7–11	Simmons	**Law** (1–3)	Taylor	26,020	29–33
63	June 17	@ Braves	9–3	**Cardwell** (3–8)	Cloninger	—	8,631	30–33
64	June 18	@ Braves	5–7 (10)	Shaw	**McBean** (7–2)	—	7,397	30–34
65	June 19	@ Braves	6–2	**Francis** (3–2)	Sadowski	**Gibbon** (1)	6,715	31–34
66	June 20	@ Braves	1–2	Lemaster	**Haddix** (1–2)	—	6,496	31–35
67	June 21	@ Cubs	5–6 (10)	Elston	**Gibbon** (2–5)	—	13,321	31–36
68	June 22	@ Cubs	3–0	**Friend** (9–5)	Ellsworth	—	20,761	32–36
69	June 23	@ Cubs	7–6	**Haddix** (2–2)	Hobbie	**McBean** (1)	26,158	33–36
70	June 25	Phillies	4–5 (10)	Klippstein	**Haddix** (2–3)	Bennett	12,365	33–37
71	June 26	Phillies	2–6	McLish	**Friend** (9–6)	—	9,153	33–38
72	June 27	Phillies	4–13	Culp	**Cardwell** (3–9)	Klippstein	9,576	33–39
73	June 28	Mets	3–1	**Gibbon** (3–5)	Craig	**McBean** (2)	10,073	34–39
74	June 29	Mets	4–3	**McBean** (8–2)	Bearnarth	—	13,846	35–39
75	June 30	Mets	3–0	**Friend** (10–6)	Stallard	**McBean** (3)	12,429	36–39

July: 16–14 (Home: 8–5; Away: 8–9)

#	Date	Opponent	Score	Win	Loss	Save	Attendance	Record
76	July 1	@ Phillies	2–1	**Cardwell** (4–9)	Culp	—		37–39
77	July 1	@ Phillies	1–8	McLish	**Francis** (3–3)	—	21,661	37–40
78	July 2	@ Phillies	3–2	**Law** (2–3)	Green	**McBean** (4)	6,844	38–40
79	July 4	@ Phillies	0–1 (10)	Mahaffey	**Friend** (10–7)	—		38–41
80	July 4	@ Phillies	1–5	Duren	**Gibbon** (3–6)	—	16,198	38–42
81	July 5	@ Mets	3–1	**Cardwell** (5–9)	Stallard	**McBean** (5)	6,779	39–42
82	July 6	@ Mets	11–3	**Schwall** (4–4)	Jackson	**Face** (8)	22,698	40–42
83	July 7	@ Mets	11–5	**Law** (3–3)	Hook	**McBean** (6)	9,741	41–42
84	July 10	Colt .45s	0–2	Johnson	**Friend** (10–8)	Woodeshick	6,517	41–43
85	July 11	Colt .45s	3–0	**Cardwell** (6–9)	Farrell	—	6,896	42–43
86	July 12	Colt .45s	2–1	**Schwall** (5–4)	Bruce	**Face** (9)	8,997	43–43
87	July 13	Colt .45s	3–0	**Law** (4–3)	Drott	—	6,775	44–43
88	July 15	Giants	2–1	**McBean** (9–2)	Marichal	—		45–43
89	July 15	Giants	4–1	**Gibbon** (4–6)	O'Dell	—	24,357	46–43
90	July 16	Giants	2–3	Fisher	**Cardwell** (6–10)	Pierce		46–44
91	July 16	Giants	3–2	**Schwall** (6–4)	Sanford	**McBean** (7)	23,251	47–44
92	July 17	Dodgers	2–3	Miller	**Law** (4–4)	Perranoski	16,658	47–45
93	July 18	Dodgers	5–10	Podres	**Francis** (3–4)	Sherry	15,883	47–46
94	July 19	Cubs	9–4	**Friend** (11–8)	Ellsworth	**McBean** (8)	13,670	48–46
95	July 21	Cubs	1–5	Toth	**Cardwell** (6–11)	—		48–47
96	July 21	Cubs	6–5 (14)	**Cardwell** (7–11)	Warner	—	21,576	49–47
97	July 23	@ Dodgers	0–6	Podres	**Friend** (11–9)	—	33,167	49–48
98	July 24	@ Dodgers	1–5	Drysdale	**Francis** (3–5)	—	30,462	49–49
99	July 25	@ Dodgers	6–2	**Sisk** (1–0)	Koufax	—	41,154	50–49
100	July 26	@ Giants	4–6	Fisher	**Face** (2–6)	—	27,017	50–50
101	July 27	@ Giants	1–3	Marichal	**McBean** (9–3)	—	23,021	50–51
102	July 28	@ Giants	1–3	Sanford	**Schwall** (6–5)	—	32,412	50–52
103	July 29	@ Giants	4–5	Duffalo	**Law** (4–5)	Pierce	12,089	50–53
104	July 30	@ Colt .45s	8–1	**Gibbon** (5–6)	Brown	—	6,976	51–53
105	July 31	@ Colt .45s	6–3	**Friend** (12–9)	Woodeshick	**Face** (10)	6,093	52–53

August: 15–13 (Home: 9–7; Away: 6–6)

#	Date	Opponent	Score	Win	Loss	Save	Attendance	Record
106	August 2	@ Reds	0–3	Maloney	**Cardwell** (7–12)	—	14,807	52–54
107	August 3	@ Reds	5–4	**McBean** (10–3)	Tsitouris	—	7,157	53–54
108	August 4	@ Reds	2–5	Purkey	**Friend** (12–10)	—		53–55
109	August 4	@ Reds	1–4	Nuxhall	**Gibbon** (5–7)	—	18,380	53–56
110	August 6	Braves	3–0	**Cardwell** (8–12)	Lemaster	**McBean** (9)	9,992	54–56
111	August 7	Braves	5–4	**McBean** (11–3)	Raymond	—	8,124	55–56
112	August 8	Braves	1–0	**Friend** (13–10)	Sadowski	—	9,110	56–56
113	August 9	Colt .45s	6–7 (15)	Woodeshick	**Schwall** (6–6)	—		56–57
114	August 9	Colt .45s	7–6 (11)	**McBean** (12–3)	Drott	—	9,420	57–57
115	August 10	Colt .45s	3–2	**Cardwell** (9–12)	Nottebart	**Face** (11)	7,951	58–57
116	August 11	Colt .45s	2–1	**Face** (3–6)	Brown	—	8,093	59–57
117	August 12	Colt .45s	4–2	**Friend** (14–10)	Farrell	**Face** (12)	7,240	60–57
118	August 14	@ Mets	2–4	Jackson	**Schwall** (6–7)	Bearnarth	9,406	60–58
119	August 15	@ Mets	8–2	**Cardwell** (10–12)	Cisco	—	7,822	61–58
120	August 16	Phillies	0–3	Short	**Gibbon** (5–8)	—	12,031	61–59
121	August 17	Phillies	3–5	Duren	**Friend** (14–11)	—	7,881	61–60
122	August 18	Phillies	1–3	Klippstein	**Schwall** (6–8)	—	10,696	61–61
123	August 20	@ Cubs	5–3	**Cardwell** (11–12)	Buhl	**Face** (13)	15,161	62–61
124	August 21	@ Cubs	7–6	**McBean** (13–3)	McDaniel	**Face** (14)	15,341	63–61
125	August 22	@ Cubs	9–3	**Friend** (15–11)	Jackson	**McBean** (10)	9,310	64–61
126	August 23	@ Phillies	2–4	Bennett	**Schwall** (6–9)	Baldschun	18,126	64–62
127	August 24	@ Phillies	7–0	**Cardwell** (12–12)	Short	—	18,276	65–62
128	August 25	@ Phillies	2–4 (11)	Baldschun	**Face** (3–7)	—	10,183	65–63
129	August 27	Mets	2–1	**Friend** (16–11)	Cisco	—	7,819	66–63
130	August 28	Mets	7–2	**Cardwell** (13–12)	Jackson	**Face** (15)	6,123	67–63
131	August 29	Mets	4–7	Craig	**Gibbon** (5–9)	Bearnarth	10,148	67–64
132	August 30	Reds	1–2	Nuxhall	**Schwall** (6–10)	Henry	10,924	67–65
133	August 31	Reds	0–6	O'Toole	**Friend** (16–12)	Zanni	7,759	67–66

September: 7–22 (Home: 5–10; Away: 2–12)

#	Date	Opponent	Score	Win	Loss	Save	Attendance	Record
134	September 1	Reds	6–4	**Francis** (4–5)	Worthington	—	8,820	68–66
135	September 2	@ Cardinals	1–6	Gibson	**Veale** (1–1)	—		68–67
136	September 2	@ Cardinals	2–6	Taylor	**Gibbon** (5–10)	—	22,458	68–68
137	September 3	@ Cardinals	5–10	Shantz	**Face** (3–8)	—	3,925	68–69
138	September 4	@ Braves	0–1	Spahn	**Friend** (16–13)	—	6,219	68–70
139	September 5	@ Braves	0–8	Sadowski	**Parsons** (0–1)	—	4,699	68–71
140	September 6	Cardinals	1–5	Gibson	**Cardwell** (13–13)	—		68–72
141	September 6	Cardinals	5–0	**Veale** (2–1)	Taylor	—	11,825	69–72
142	September 7	Cardinals	5–6	Schultz	**Haddix** (2–4)	Burdette	8,427	69–73
143	September 8	Cardinals	2–3	Broglio	**Friend** (16–14)	Taylor	14,866	69–74
144	September 10	Dodgers	2–4	Koufax	**Cardwell** (13–14)	—	11,152	69–75
145	September 11	Dodgers	4–9	Richert	**Veale** (2–2)	Perranoski	8,514	69–76
146	September 12	Dodgers	3–5	Podres	**Friend** (16–15)	Perranoski	2,644	69–77
147	September 13	Giants	5–4 (13)	**Friend** (17–15)	Garibaldi	—	6,100	70–77
148	September 14	Giants	3–7	Sanford	**Cardwell** (13–15)	Pierce	5,489	70–78
149	September 15	Giants	5–13	O'Dell	**Schwall** (6–11)	—	18,916	70–79
150	September 16	Cubs	1–0	**Veale** (3–2)	Jackson	—	2,917	71–79
151	September 17	Cubs	1–3	Buhl	**Friend** (17–16)	McDaniel		71–80
152	September 17	Cubs	4–3	**Haddix** (3–4)	McDaniel	**McBean** (11)	5,160	72–80
153	September 18	Cubs	1–2	Elston	**Gibbon** (5–11)	—	5,891	72–81
154	September 20	@ Dodgers	0–2	Drysdale	**Schwall** (6–12)	—	40,476	72–82
155	September 21	@ Dodgers	3–5	Miller	**Sisk** (1–1)	—	48,038	72–83
156	September 22	@ Dodgers	4–0	**Veale** (4–2)	Podres	**Face** (16)	36,878	73–83
157	September 24	@ Colt .45s	2–3	Zachary	**Francis** (4–6)	Woodeshick	3,144	73–84
158	September 25	@ Colt .45s	1–2	Johnson	**Sisk** (1–2)	Farrell	3,118	73–85
159	September 26	@ Colt .45s	4–5 (11)	McMahon	**Face** (3–9)	—	2,782	73–86
160	September 27	@ Giants	8–3	**Veale** (5–2)	Bolin	—	10,725	74–86
161	September 28	@ Giants	2–3	Marichal	**Gibbon** (5–12)	—	10,332	74–87
162	September 29	@ Giants	2–4	Sanford	**Sisk** (1–3)	O'Dell	33,301	74–88

Legend: = Win = Loss
Bold = Pirates team member

=== Notable transactions ===
- April 4, 1963: Howie Goss and cash were traded by the Pirates to the Houston Colt .45s for Manny Mota.

=== Roster ===
1963 Pittsburgh Pirates
**Roster**
**Pitchers**: 32 Tom Butters; 30 Don Cardwell; 26 Roy Face; 27 Earl Francis; 19 Bob Friend; 22 Joe Gibbon; 31 Harvey Haddix; 32 Vern Law; 34 Al McBean; 35 Tom Parsons; 29 Don Schwall; 25 Tommie Sisk; 15 Tom Sturdivant; 39 Bob Veale	**Catchers**: 16 Ron Brand; 6 Smoky Burgess; 3 Jim Pagliaroni; 2 Elmo Plaskett; **Infielders**: 12 Gene Alley; 7 Bob Bailey; 17 Donn Clendenon; 16 Julio Gotay; 23 Johnny Logan; 9 Bill Mazeroski; 11 Dick Schofield	**Outfielders**: 21 Roberto Clemente; 5,24 Jerry Lynch; 15 Manny Mota; 2,14 Ted Savage; 4 Bob Skinner; 8 Willie Stargell; 18 Bill Virdon; **Other batters**: 5 Larry Elliot	**Manager**: 40 Danny Murtaugh; **Coaches**: 47 Gene Baker; 45 Lenny Levy; 43 Sam Narron; 42 Ron Northey; 44 Frank Oceak; 41 Don Osborn; 10 Virgil Trucks

== Statistics ==
Batting

Note: G = Games played; AB = At bats; H = Hits; Avg. = Batting average; HR = Home runs; RBI = Runs batted in

Regular Season
Player	G	AB	H	Avg.	HR	RBI
J. Gotay	4	2	1	0.500	0	0
T. Butters	6	3	1	0.333	0	1
R. Clemente	152	600	192	0.320	17	76
E. Francis	34	26	8	0.308	0	3
R. Brand	46	66	19	0.288	1	7
S. Burgess	91	264	74	0.280	6	37
D. Clendenon	154	563	155	0.275	15	57
B. Skinner	34	122	33	0.270	0	8
M. Mota	59	126	34	0.270	0	7
B. Virdon	142	554	149	0.269	8	53
J. Lynch	88	237	63	0.266	10	36
R. Face	56	8	2	0.250	0	1
D. Schofield	138	541	133	0.246	3	32
B. Mazeroski	142	534	131	0.245	8	52
W. Stargell	108	304	74	0.243	11	47
J. Logan	81	181	42	0.232	0	9
J. Pagliaroni	92	252	58	0.230	11	26
B. Bailey	154	570	130	0.228	12	45
V. Law	21	23	5	0.217	0	0
G. Alley	17	51	11	0.216	0	0
T. Savage	85	149	29	0.195	5	14
A. McBean	59	31	6	0.194	1	3
H. Haddix	50	11	2	0.182	0	2
D. Schwall	33	50	8	0.160	0	1
E. Plaskett	10	21	3	0.143	0	2
B. Friend	39	86	9	0.105	0	2
J. Gibbon	40	43	4	0.093	0	0
B. Veale	35	23	2	0.087	0	0
D. Cardwell	33	71	6	0.085	0	2
T. Sisk	57	16	1	0.063	0	0
L. Elliot	4	4	0	0.000	0	0
T. Parsons	1	2	0	0.000	0	0
T. Sturdivant	3	2	0	0.000	0	0
Team totals	162	5,536	1,385	0.250	108	523

Pitching

Note: G = Games pitched; IP = Innings pitched; W = Wins; L = Losses; ERA = Earned run average; SO = Strikeouts

Regular Season
Player	G	IP	W	L	ERA	SO
B. Veale	34	77 2/3	5	2	1.04	68
B. Friend	39	268 2/3	17	16	2.34	144
A. McBean	55	122 1/3	13	3	2.57	74
T. Sisk	57	108	1	3	2.92	73
D. Cardwell	33	213 2/3	13	15	3.07	112
R. Face	56	69 2/3	3	9	3.23	41
J. Gibbon	37	147 1/3	5	12	3.30	110
D. Schwall	33	167 2/3	6	12	3.33	86
H. Haddix	49	70	3	4	3.34	70
T. Butters	6	16 1/3	0	0	4.41	11
E. Francis	33	97 1/3	4	6	4.53	72
V. Law	18	76 2/3	4	5	4.93	31
T. Sturdivant	3	8 8 1/3	0	0	6.48	6
T. Parsons	1	4 4 1/3	0	1	8.31	2
Team totals	162	1448	74	88	3.10	900

== Awards and honors ==
All-Star Game

- Bill Mazeroski, second base, (selected as starter but did not play due to injury)
- Roberto Clemente, reserve

== Farm system ==
Level	Team	League	Manager
AAA	Columbus Jets	International League	Larry Shepard
AA	Asheville Tourists	Sally League	Ray Hathaway
A	Reno Silver Sox	California League	Tom Saffell
A	Kinston Eagles	Carolina League	Harding "Pete" Peterson
A	Batavia Pirates	New York–Penn League	Buddy Hancken
A	Gastonia Pirates	Western Carolinas League	Bob Clear
Rookie	Kingsport Pirates	Appalachian League	Al Kubski

LEAGUE CHAMPIONS: Batavia
