= 1963 San Francisco Giants season =

1963 San Francisco Giants
- League: National League
- Ballpark: Candlestick Park
- City: San Francisco
- Record: 88–74 (.543)
- League place: 3rd
- Owners: Horace Stoneham
- General managers: Chub Feeney
- Managers: Alvin Dark
- Television: KTVU (Russ Hodges, Lon Simmons)
- Radio: KSFO (Russ Hodges, Lon Simmons)

The 1963 San Francisco Giants season was the Giants' 81st year in Major League Baseball, their sixth year in San Francisco since their move from New York following the 1957 season, and their fourth at Candlestick Park. The team finished in third place in the National League with an 88–74 record, 11 games behind the Los Angeles Dodgers.

== Offseason ==
- November 30, 1962: Manny Mota and Dick LeMay were traded by the Giants to the Houston Colt .45s for Joey Amalfitano.
- December 15, 1962: Stu Miller, Mike McCormick, and John Orsino were traded by the Giants to the Baltimore Orioles for Jack Fisher, Jimmie Coker and Billy Hoeft.

== Regular season ==
=== Season standings ===
National League
Team	W	L	Pct.	GB	Home	Road
Los Angeles Dodgers	99	63	.611	—	50‍–‍31	49‍–‍32
St. Louis Cardinals	93	69	.574	6	53‍–‍28	40‍–‍41
San Francisco Giants	88	74	.543	11	50‍–‍31	38‍–‍43
Philadelphia Phillies	87	75	.537	12	45‍–‍36	42‍–‍39
Cincinnati Reds	86	76	.531	13	46‍–‍35	40‍–‍41
Milwaukee Braves	84	78	.519	15	45‍–‍36	39‍–‍42
Chicago Cubs	82	80	.506	17	43‍–‍38	39‍–‍42
Pittsburgh Pirates	74	88	.457	25	42‍–‍39	32‍–‍49
Houston Colt .45s	66	96	.407	33	44‍–‍37	22‍–‍59
New York Mets	51	111	.315	48	34‍–‍47	17‍–‍64

=== Record vs. opponents ===
1963 National League record Sources:
Team	CHC	CIN	HOU	LAD	MIL	NYM	PHI	PIT	SF	STL
Chicago	—	9–9	9–9	7–11	12–6	11–7	9–9	8–10	10–8	7–11
Cincinnati	9–9	—	11–7	8–10	10–8	10–8	8–10	11–7	8–10	11–7
Houston	9–9	7–11	—	5–13	5–13	13–5	8–10	6–12	8–10	5–13
Los Angeles	11–7	10–8	13–5	—	8–10–1	16–2	7–11	13–5	9–9	12–6
Milwaukee	6–12	8–10	13–5	10–8–1	—	12–6	10–8	7–11	10–8	8–10
New York	7–11	8–10	5–13	2–16	6–12	—	8–10	4–14	6–12	5–13
Philadelphia	9–9	10–8	10–8	11–7	8–10	10–8	—	13–5	8–10	8–10
Pittsburgh	10–8	7–11	12–6	5–13	11–7	14–4	5–13	—	5–13	5–13
San Francisco	8–10	10–8	10–8	9–9	8–10	12–6	10–8	13–5	—	8–10
St. Louis	11–7	7–11	13–5	6–12	10–8	13–5	10–8	13–5	10–8	—

=== Opening Day starters ===
- Felipe Alou
- Orlando Cepeda
- Jim Davenport
- Tom Haller
- Chuck Hiller
- Willie Mays
- Willie McCovey
- José Pagán
- Jack Sanford

=== Notable transactions ===
- August 8, 1963: Norm Larker was purchased by the Giants from the Milwaukee Braves.

=== Roster ===
1963 San Francisco Giants
Roster
Pitchers: 42 Bobby Bolin; 34 Jim Constable; 45 Jim Duffalo; 22 Jack Fisher; 28 Bob Garibaldi; 34 Ron Herbel; 20 Billy Hoeft; 18 Don Larsen; 36 Frank Linzy; 27 Juan Marichal; 31 Billy O'Dell; 35,36 Gaylord Perry; 19 Billy Pierce; 40 John Pregenzer; 33 Jack Sanford; 48 Al Stanek	Catchers: 6 Ed Bailey; 2 Jimmie Coker; 5 Tom Haller; Infielders: 14 Joey Amalfitano; 21 Ernie Bowman; 30 Orlando Cepeda; 12 Jim Davenport; 16 Jim Ray Hart; 26 Chuck Hiller; 16 Norm Larker; 15 José Pagán; 17 Cap Peterson	Outfielders: 23 Felipe Alou; 14 Jesús Alou; 41 Matty Alou; 10 José Cardenal; 7 Harvey Kuenn; 24 Willie Mays; 44 Willie McCovey	Manager: 1 Alvin Dark; Coaches: 46 Larry Jansen; 3 Whitey Lockman; 9 Wes Westrum

== Season summary ==
- July 2: A four-hour and ten minute pitching duel between Juan Marichal and Warren Spahn ends with Willie Mays hitting a home run in the bottom of the 16th inning, the SF Giants winning 1-0.

== Game log ==
=== Regular season ===
Legend
	Giants win
	Giants loss
	Postponement
	Eliminated from playoff race
**Bold**	Giants team member

1963 regular season game log: 88–74 (Home: 50–31; Away: 38–43)
April: 11–9 (Home: 8–8; Away: 5–1)

#	Date	Time (PT)	Opponent	Score	Win	Loss	Save	Time of Game	Attendance	Record	Box/ Streak

May: 19–9 (Home: 9–3; Away: 10–6)

#	Date	Time (PT)	Opponent	Score	Win	Loss	Save	Time of Game	Attendance	Record	Box/ Streak
30	May 10	8:00 p.m. PDT	@ Dodgers	L 1–2	Drysdale (3–3)	**Sanford** (5–2)	—	2:00	50,407	19–11	L1
31	May 11	8:00 p.m. PDT	@ Dodgers	L 0–8	Koufax (4–1)	**Marichal** (4–3)	—	2:13	49,807	19–12	L2
32	May 12	1:00 p.m. PDT	@ Dodgers	L 5–6	Calmus (1–0)	**Fisher** (3–3)	Perranoski (2)	2:38	43,964	19–13	L3
42	May 24	8:15 p.m. PDT	Dodgers	**W** 7–1	**Marichal** (6–3)	Koufax (6–2)	—	2:05	40,676	27–15	W4
43	May 25	1:00 p.m. PDT	Dodgers	**W** 6–2	**O'Dell** (7–0)	Podres (3–4)	**Larsen** (1)	2:13	39,858	28–15	W5
44	May 26	1:00 p.m. PDT	Dodgers	L 3–4 (10)	Drysdale (6–4)	**Larsen**(0–2)	—	2:50	41,668	28–16	L1

June: 14–15 (Home: 9–3; Away: 5–12)

#	Date	Time (PT)	Opponent	Score	Win	Loss	Save	Time of Game	Attendance	Record	Box/ Streak
58	June 10	8:00 p.m. PDT	@ Dodgers	**W** 7–3	**Larsen** (1–3)	Perranoski (7–2)	—	3:12	52,993	32–26	W1
59	June 11	8:00 p.m. PDT	@ Dodgers	**W** 3–0	**Marichal** (9–3)	Drysdale (7–7)	—	2:10	53,436	33–26	W2
66	June 17	8:15 p.m. PDT	Dodgers	L 0–2	Koufax (10–3)	**O'Dell** (9–3)	—	2:13	36,818	38–28	L1
67	June 18	8:15 p.m. PDT	Dodgers	**W** 9–3	**Sanford** (9–5)	Miller (4–4)	—	2:21	37,780	39–28	W1
68	June 19	1:00 p.m. PDT	Dodgers	**W** 8–3	**Marichal** (11–3)	Drysdale (8–8)	**Pierce** (3)	2:32	41,384	40–28	W2

July: 16–14 (Home: 12–5; Away: 4–9)

#	Date	Time (PT)	Opponent	Score	Win	Loss	Save	Time of Game	Attendance	Record	Box/ Streak
—	July 9	10:00 a.m. PDT	34th All-Star Game	National League vs. American League (Cleveland Municipal Stadium, Cleveland, Ohio)							

August: 14–14 (Home: 5–5; Away: 9–9)

#	Date	Time (PT)	Opponent	Score	Win	Loss	Save	Time of Game	Attendance	Record	Box/ Streak
133	August 29	8:00 p.m. PDT	@ Dodgers	L 1–11	Koufax (20–5)	**Pierce** (3–10)	—	2:38	54,978	73–60	L1
134	August 30	8:00 p.m. PDT	@ Dodgers	L 1–3	Drysdale (17–15)	**Marichal** (19–8)	—	2:34	54,843	73–61	L2
135	August 31	8:00 p.m. PDT	@ Dodgers	**W** 4–3 (12)	**Larsen** (6–5)	Sherry (2–5)	—	3:25	54,858	74–61	W1

September: 14–13 (Home: 9–8; Away: 5–5)

#	Date	Time (PT)	Opponent	Score	Win	Loss	Save	Time of Game	Attendance	Record	Box/ Streak
136	September 1	1:00 p.m. PDT	@ Dodgers	L 3–5	Calmus (3–1)	**Larsen** (6–6)	Podres (1)	3:42	54,263	74–62	L1
142	September 6	8:15 p.m. PDT	Dodgers	L 2–5	Koufax (22–5)	**O'Dell** (12–7)	Perranoski (15)	2:35	38,161	76–66	L2
143	September 7	1:00 p.m. PDT	Dodgers	**W** 5–3	**Marichal** (21–8)	Drysdale (17–16)	—	2:04	36,879	77–66	W1
144	September 8	1:00 p.m. PDT	Dodgers	**W** 5–4	**Larsen** (7–6)	Perranoski (14–3)	—	2:45	38,569	78–66	W2

=== Detailed records ===
**National League**
Opponent	Home	Away	Total	Pct.	Runs scored	Runs allowed
Los Angeles Dodgers	6–3	3–6	9–9	.500	70	68
**San Francisco Giants**	—	—	—	—	—	—
	**50–31**	**38–43**	**88–74**	**.543**	**725**	**641**

== Player stats ==
=== Batting ===
==== Starters by position ====
Note: Pos = Position; G = Games played; AB = At bats; H = Hits; Avg. = Batting average; HR = Home runs; RBI = Runs batted in

Pos	Player	G	AB	H	Avg.	HR	RBI
C	Ed Bailey	105	308	81	.263	21	68
1B	Orlando Cepeda	156	579	183	.316	34	97
2B	Chuck Hiller	111	417	93	.223	6	33
SS	José Pagán	148	483	113	.234	6	39
3B	Jim Davenport	147	460	116	.252	4	36
LF	Willie McCovey	152	564	158	.280	44	102
CF	Willie Mays	157	596	187	.314	38	103
RF	Felipe Alou	157	565	159	.281	20	82

==== Other batters ====
Note: G = Games played; AB = At bats; H = Hits; Avg. = Batting average; HR = Home runs; RBI = Runs batted in

Player	G	AB	H	Avg.	HR	RBI
Harvey Kuenn	120	417	121	.290	6	31
Tom Haller	98	298	76	.255	14	44
Joey Amalfitano	54	137	24	.175	1	7
Ernie Bowman	81	125	23	.184	0	4
Matty Alou	63	76	11	.145	0	2
Cap Peterson	22	54	14	.259	1	2
Jesús Alou	16	24	6	.250	0	5
Jim Ray Hart	7	20	4	.200	0	2
Norm Larker	19	14	1	.071	0	0
José Cardenal	9	5	1	.200	0	2
Jimmie Coker	4	5	1	.200	0	0

=== Pitching ===
==== Starting pitchers ====
Note: G = Games pitched; IP = Innings pitched; W = Wins; L = Losses; ERA = Earned run average; SO = Strikeouts

Player	G	IP	W	L	ERA	SO
Juan Marichal	41	321.1	25	8	2.41	248
Jack Sanford	42	284.1	16	13	3.51	158
Billy O'Dell	36	222.1	14	10	3.16	116

==== Other pitchers ====
Note: G = Games pitched; IP = Innings pitched; W = Wins; L = Losses; ERA = Earned run average; SO = Strikeouts

Player	G	IP	W	L	ERA	SO
Bobby Bolin	47	137.1	10	6	3.28	134
Jack Fisher	36	116.0	6	10	4.58	57
Billy Pierce	38	99.0	3	11	4.27	52
Gaylord Perry	31	76.0	1	6	4.03	52
Jim Duffalo	34	75.1	4	2	2.87	55
Frank Linzy	8	16.2	0	0	4.86	14

==== Relief pitchers ====
Note: G = Games pitched; W = Wins; L = Losses; SV = Saves; ERA = Earned run average; SO = Strikeouts

Player	G	W	L	SV	ERA	SO
Don Larsen	46	7	7	4	3.05	44
Billy Hoeft	23	2	0	4	4.44	8
Al Stanek	11	0	0	0	4.73	5
John Pregenzer	6	0	0	1	4.82	5
Bob Garibaldi	4	0	1	1	1.13	4
Jim Constable	4	0	0	0	3.86	1
Ron Herbel	2	0	0	0	6.75	1

== Awards and honors ==
- Willie Mays, All-Star Game Most Valuable Player

All-Star Game

- Ed Bailey, catcher, starter
- Willie Mays, outfield, starter
- Orlando Cepeda, reserve
- Juan Marichal, reserve
- Willie McCovey, reserve

== Farm system ==
Level	Team	League	Manager
AAA	Tacoma Giants	Pacific Coast League	Andy Gilbert
AA	Springfield Giants	Eastern League	Buddy Kerr
AA	El Paso Sun Kings	Texas League	George Genovese
A	Fresno Giants	California League	Bill Werle
A	Decatur Commodores	Midwest League	Richie Klaus
A	Lexington Giants	Western Carolinas League	Max Lanier
Rookie	Salem Rebels	Appalachian League	Alex Cosmidis
