= Tom Parsons (baseball) =

American baseball player (born 1939)

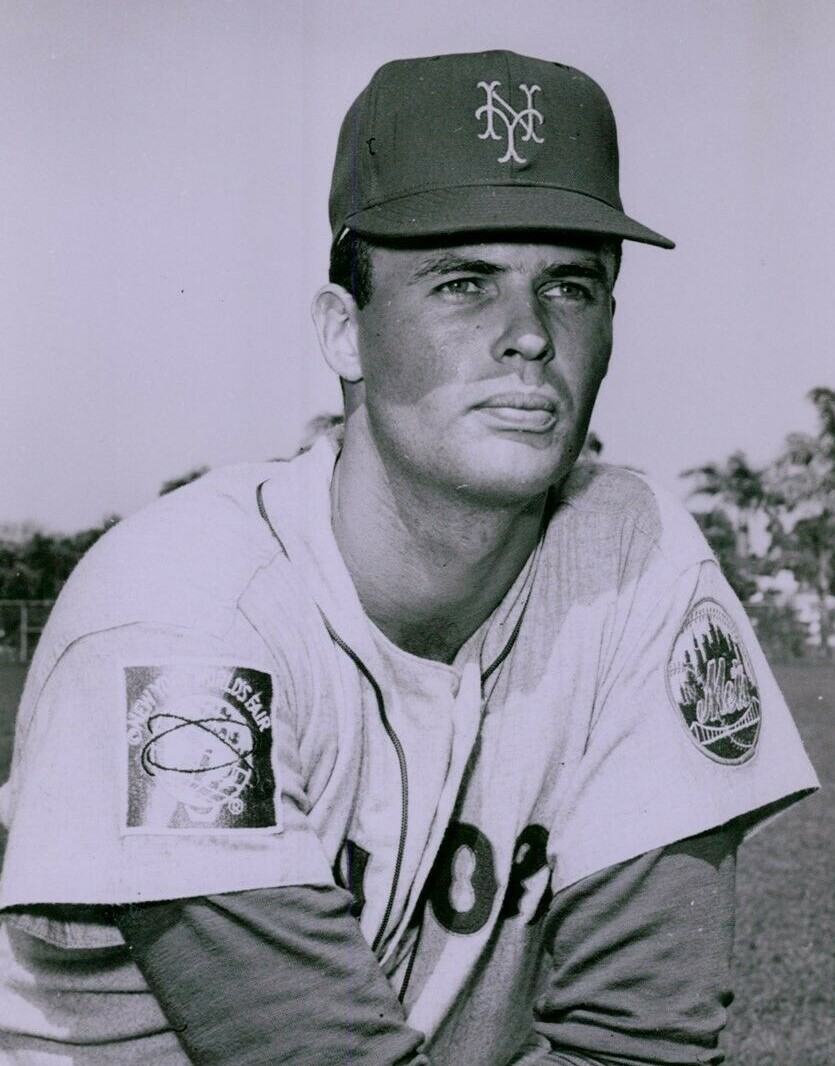
- Pitcher
- Born: September 13, 1939 (age 86); Lakeville, Connecticut, U.S.
- Batted: Right Threw: Right

MLB debut
- September 5, 1963, for the Pittsburgh Pirates

Last MLB appearance
- September 9, 1965, for the New York Mets

MLB statistics
- Win–loss record: 2–13
- Earned run average: 4.72
- Strikeouts: 70
- Stats at Baseball Reference

Teams
- Pittsburgh Pirates (1963); New York Mets (1964–1965)

Thomas Anthony Parsons (born September 13, 1939) is an American former Major League Baseball pitcher who played for the Pittsburgh Pirates (1963) and New York Mets (1964–65). The native of Lakeville, Connecticut, was listed as 6 feet 7 inches (2.01 m) tall and 210 pounds (95 kg).

Parsons' professional career lasted for 13 seasons (1957–69). After he signed with Pittsburgh, the right-hander spent seven full years in their farm system, but he would make only one appearance in a Pirate uniform, as the starting pitcher in an 8–0 defeat in his debut against the Milwaukee Braves on September 5, 1963. The following year was chaotic. Parsons began the 1964 season pitching at Triple-A Columbus, then was traded by Pittsburgh to the Houston Colt .45s in June. After he got into 19 games for Houston's Triple-A affiliate, the Oklahoma City 89ers, the June trade was cancelled and Parsons returned to the Pirates, who in turn sold his contract to the Mets. Parsons then worked in four September 1964 games, including a September 20 start against his former organization, Houston; Parsons went the distance and gave up only six hits but lost, 1–0.

His only full year in the majors came in 1965, for the last-place Mets. Parsons appeared in 35 games, with 11 starting assignments. He lost ten of 11 decisions but his lone win was a complete game shutout against the Chicago Cubs July 5 at Shea Stadium in the second game of a doubleheader. He also registered his only MLB save that season; that came June 3 against his original team, the Pirates. His final appearance came in relief on September 9 at Cincinnati's Crosley Field.

Parsons compiled a 2–13 (.133) record and a 4.72 earned run average during his MLB career. In 40 games pitched (14 career starts), he allowed 135 hits and 25 bases on balls in 1141/3 innings pitched. He struck out 70 hitters.

He pitched four more seasons of minor league baseball, returning to the Houston organization from 1966–68 before concluding his career in 1969 in his native New England in the Boston Red Sox organization.
