= John Pregenzer =

American baseball player (1932–2024)

- Pitcher
- Born: August 2, 1932; Burlington, Wisconsin, U.S.
- Died: January 31, 2024 (aged 91); Paris, Missouri, U.S.
- Batted: Right Threw: Right

MLB debut
- April 20, 1963, for the San Francisco Giants

Last MLB appearance
- September 7, 1964, for the San Francisco Giants

MLB statistics
- Win–loss record: 2–0
- Earned run average: 4.88
- Innings pitched: 27 2/3
- Stats at Baseball Reference

Teams
- San Francisco Giants (1963–1964)

John Arthur Pregenzer (August 2, 1932 – January 31, 2024) was an American professional baseball pitcher who appeared in parts of two Major League Baseball seasons (1963–64) for the San Francisco Giants. The right-hander stood 6 feet 5 inches (1.96 m) tall and weighed 220 pounds (100 kg).

== Biography ==
Born in Burlington, Wisconsin, Pregenzer graduated from Antioch Community High School, in Illinois, and attended Illinois Wesleyan University. He was initially signed by the Pittsburgh Pirates before being acquired by the Giants as a minor leaguer during the 1960–61 offseason. That everyday baseball transaction would contribute to Pregenzer's fame during his brief Major League career. When Pregenzer made the Giants' roster at the outset of 1963, he came to the attention of Novella O'Hara, a baseball fan who wrote the "Question Man" column for the San Francisco Chronicle.

According to the journalist's 1997 obituary: "Miss O'Hara organized in 1963 the remarkable John Pregenzer Fan Club, after hearing that the Giants had acquired a rookie relief pitcher of that name for the waiver fee of $100. Miss O'Hara was fascinated with the idea that a baseball player could be acquired for such an affordable sum, and she asked the Giants if she could buy one, too. The fan club lasted longer than Pregenzer, who pitched in 19 games before being booted to the minors. Before Pregenzer's departure, however, Miss O'Hara had arranged for him to receive a baked pheasant testimonial dinner, a quality transistor radio and a scroll naming him honorary mayor of Fresno." At its peak, the John Pregenzer Fan Club attracted 3,000 members.

In Pregenzer's 19 games for the Giants, he went undefeated in two decisions. In 27 2/3 innings pitched, he allowed 29 hits and 19 bases on balls. He recorded 13 strikeouts and one save. He was a successful minor league pitcher; over eight campaigns, he won 66 games, losing 49 with an earned run average of 3.67.

Pregenzer later lived in Puyallup, Washington. He died in Paris, Missouri, on January 31, 2024, at the age of 91.
