= Phil Mudrock =

American baseball player (born 1937)

- Pitcher
- Born: June 12, 1937 (age 89); Louisville, Colorado, U.S.
- Batted: Right Threw: Right

MLB debut
- April 19, 1963, for the Chicago Cubs

Last MLB appearance
- April 19, 1963, for the Chicago Cubs

MLB statistics
- Win–loss record: 0–0
- Earned run average: 9.00
- Innings pitched: 1
- Stats at Baseball Reference

Teams
- Chicago Cubs (1963)

Philip Ray Mudrock (born June 12, 1937) is an American former professional baseball player. Mudrock was a right-handed pitcher who spent a decade (1956–1965) as a professional, but who appeared in only one inning of one Major League game on April 19, 1963.

Mudrock batted right-handed, stood 6 feet 1 inch (1.85 m) tall and weighed 190 pounds (86 kg). Originally signed by the New York Yankees, he never rose above the Class A Eastern League as a member of the Yankee farm system, and was acquired by the Chicago Cubs after the 1960 minor league baseball season. Listed on the Cubs' 40-man spring training roster for 1963, Mudrock began the National League season with Chicago and made his debut at Candlestick Park against the defending NL champion San Francisco Giants. He entered the game in relief of starting pitcher Larry Jackson in the eighth inning, with the Cubs trailing 4–0. In his one inning of relief, he surrendered a lead-off double to Jim Davenport and an RBI hit to Willie McCovey. He also committed a balk; at the time, National League umpires were instructed to enforce the balk rule, and an abnormally high number of balk calls were made in the early weeks of the season. (The Giants' starter, Juan Marichal, was also cited in the same game). The Giants eventually won, 5–1.

In the minor leagues, Mudrock compiled a 58–74 won–lost record and a 4.68 earned run average in 241 games.
