= Mickey Harrington =

American baseball player (1934-2017)

- Pinch runner
- Born: October 8, 1934; Hattiesburg, Mississippi, U.S.
- Died: September 20, 2017 (aged 82); Hattiesburg, Mississippi, U.S.
- Batted: Right Threw: Right

MLB debut
- July 10, 1963, for the Philadelphia Phillies

Last MLB appearance
- July 10, 1963, for the Philadelphia Phillies

MLB statistics
- Games played: 1
- At bats: 0
- Hits: 0
- Stats at Baseball Reference

Teams
- Philadelphia Phillies (1963)

Charles Michael "Mickey" Harrington (October 8, 1934 – September 20, 2017) was an American professional baseball player who appeared in one game in Major League Baseball (MLB) for the Philadelphia Phillies. Born in Hattiesburg, he attended the University of Southern Mississippi. He threw and batted right-handed, stood 6 feet 4 inches (1.93 m) tall and weighed 205 pounds (93 kg).

Although Harrington played in only one MLB game, as a pinch-runner, his professional career spanned 1957–1966 as an outfielder, first baseman and third baseman in minor league action. After signing with the Phillies' organization, he was recalled from Triple-A in the midst of his seventh pro season.

His MLB appearance came on July 10, 1963, at Connie Mack Stadium, when he was called upon to pinch run following first baseman Roy Sievers' single; it was the eighth inning and the Phils led the San Francisco Giants, 10–2. Harrington advanced to second base one out later, following Don Hoak's single. But the inning ended when Clay Dalrymple grounded into a double play. Harrington did not stay in the game on defense, as veteran Frank Torre took Sievers' post at first base in the ninth.

Harrington died on September 20, 2017, in Hattiesburg, Mississippi.
