= Frank Funk (baseball) =

American baseball player (born 1935)

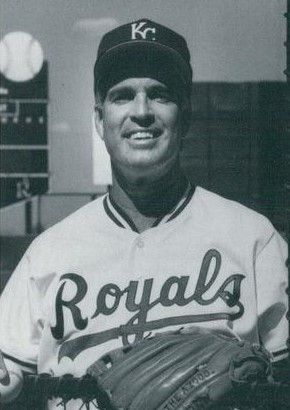
- Pitcher
- Born: August 30, 1935 (age 90); Washington, D.C., U.S.
- Batted: Right Threw: Right

MLB debut
- September 3, 1960, for the Cleveland Indians

Last MLB appearance
- September 22, 1963, for the Milwaukee Braves

MLB statistics
- Win–loss record: 20–17
- Earned run average: 3.01
- Strikeouts: 150
- Stats at Baseball Reference

Teams
- Cleveland Indians (1960–1962); Milwaukee Braves (1963)

Franklin Ray Funk (born August 30, 1935) is an American former professional baseball pitcher and coach. He pitched in Major League Baseball (MLB) from 1960 to 1963 for the Cleveland Indians and Milwaukee Braves. During a four-year MLB career, he compiled 20 wins, 150 strikeouts, and a 3.01 ERA. He was an MLB coach for four teams from 1976 to 1998.

Born in Washington, D.C., he was signed by the New York Giants as an amateur free agent in 1954. Funk was acquired by Cleveland's Triple-A International League Toronto Maple Leafs prior to the 1959 season. He made the most of his debut after a September call-up from the Maple Leafs in 1960, finishing with a 4–2 record, a 1.99 earned run average, and 1 save in just nine games for Cleveland.

Funk's best season was 1961, when he posted a win-loss record of 11–11 and led Cleveland with 11 saves and an ERA of 3.31, appearing in 56 games. Two of his victories in May involved pitching over seven innings in relief during 15-inning games against the Baltimore Orioles and Minnesota Twins, respectively.

After a 2–1 season with a 3.24 ERA and six saves in 1962 over 47 games, Funk was traded to the Milwaukee Braves along with outfielders Don Dillard and Ty Cline for first baseman Joe Adcock and pitcher Jack Curtis. Funk pitched one season for the Braves, posting a record of 3–3 over 25 games, with an ERA of 2.68 in 1963. Funk continued to pitch in the minor leagues through 1969.

After his playing career, Funk served as a minor league manager and pitching coach. He coached in the major leagues with the San Francisco Giants, Seattle Mariners, Kansas City Royals, and Colorado Rockies.

Preceded by Ozzie Virgil Sr.	San Francisco Giants bullpen coach 1976	Succeeded by Tom Haller
Preceded by Don Bryant	Seattle Mariners bullpen coach 1980–1981	Succeeded by Bill Plummer
Preceded by Dave Duncan	Seattle Mariners pitching coach 1983–1984	Succeeded by Phil Regan
Preceded by Gary Blaylock	Kansas City Royals pitching coach 1988–1990	Succeeded by Pat Dobson
Preceded by Larry Bearnarth	Colorado Rockies pitching coach 1996–1998	Succeeded by Milt May
