= Bob Purkey =

American baseball player (1929–2008)

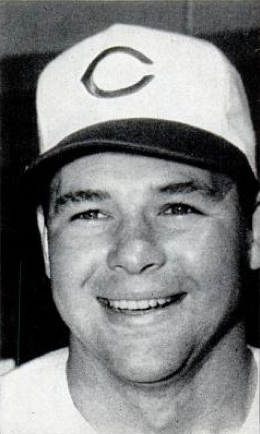
- Purkey in 1958
- Pitcher
- Born: July 14, 1929; Pittsburgh, Pennsylvania, U.S.
- Died: March 16, 2008 (aged 78); Pittsburgh, Pennsylvania, U.S.
- Batted: Right Threw: Right

MLB debut
- April 14, 1954, for the Pittsburgh Pirates

Last MLB appearance
- July 26, 1966, for the Pittsburgh Pirates

MLB statistics
- Win–loss record: 129–115
- Earned run average: 3.79
- Strikeouts: 793
- Stats at Baseball Reference

Teams
- Pittsburgh Pirates (1954–1957); Cincinnati Redlegs / Reds (1958–1964); St. Louis Cardinals (1965); Pittsburgh Pirates (1966)

Career highlights and awards
- 5× All-Star (1958, 1961–1962²); Cincinnati Reds Hall of Fame

Robert Thomas Purkey (July 14, 1929 – March 16, 2008) was an American right-handed pitcher in Major League Baseball known for his use of the knuckleball. From 1954 through 1966, Purkey played for the Pittsburgh Pirates, Cincinnati Reds / Redlegs, and St. Louis Cardinals. In 1974 he was elected to the Cincinnati Reds Hall of Fame.

== Early life ==
Purkey was born on July 14, 1929, in Pittsburgh, Pennsylvania. His father Edward was in the insurance business, and had played semi-professional baseball. Purkey attended South Hills High School, graduating in 1947.

== Minor leagues and military ==
Leo Mackey, a scout for the Pirates who had played semi-pro baseball with Edward Purkey, signed Purkey as an amateur free agent in 1948. He was assigned to the Class D Greenville Pirates in 1948, under manager and former major league pitcher Walter Tauscher. Purkey had a 19–8 won–loss record, with a 3.01 earned run average (ERA). He pitched a no-hitter for Greenville.

In 1949, he moved up to the Class B Davenport Pirates. He was 17–6, with a 2.94 ERA, 15 complete games and three shutouts. He was 12–12 in 1950 for the Double-A New Orleans Pelicans, with a 4.78 ERA. He began the season 7–1, but then missed a month of play with a sprained wrist, and did not regain his earlier form after returning.

Purkey was drafted into military service with the United States Army in the spring of 1951, and did not play professional baseball in 1951-52. Before being drafted, he had refused to sign the contract offered by the Pirates as he thought the money offered was too low; but this was mooted by the military draft.

Purkey returned to the Pelicans for the 1953 season, with an 11–13 record and 3.41 ERA, while starting 27 of the 30 games in which he appeared.

== Major league ==
=== Pittsburgh Pirates ===
He reached the major leagues in 1954. As a rookie with the Pirates, he started 11 of the 36 games in which he appeared, with a 3–8 record and 5.07 ERA. In 1955, he suffered from a sore arm, and split time between the Pelicans and the Pirates. As a Pirate he started 10 games, with a 2–7 record and 5.32 ERA. In 1956, he played most of the season with the Hollywood Stars of the Pacific Coast League, starting 14 games with a 6–8 record and 3.36 ERA; appearing in only two games in relief for the Pirates. He pitched the full season for the Pirates in 1957, both starting (21 games) and pitching in relief (27 games), with an 11–14 record, two saves and a 3.86 ERA.

In four seasons with the Pirates, he started 42 of 100 games in which appeared, posting a combined record of 16–29. During his four years with the Pirates, the team was either in last place or second-to-last place. Purkey was traded in December 1957 to the Cincinnati Reds for left-hander Don Gross.

=== Cincinnati Reds ===
After being traded to the Reds, he was used almost exclusively as a starting pitcher for the next seven years in Cincinnati. Purkey enjoyed a great deal of success over that time, going 103–76 with a 3.49 ERA for the Reds. In his first year with the Reds, Purkey had a 17–11 record and 3.60 ERA. He was selected to the 1958 National League (NL) All-Star team, and was 19th in voting for NL Most Valuable Player (MVP).

After a down year in 1959, Purkey was 17–11 with a 3.60 ERA in 1960, and 16–12 with a 3.73 ERA in 1961. He was selected to both 1961 All-Star Teams. In the July 11 All-Star game, he pitched the fourth and fifth innings without giving up a hit. He started the July 31 game, pitching two innings. He gave up one run in a game ending in a 1–1 tie, the first All-Star game ever to end in a tie.

The Reds won the NL title in 1961, but lost in the 1961 World Series to the New York Yankees. He started Game 3 of the 1961 World Series, and pitched a complete game but took the 3–2 loss after allowing solo home runs to Johnny Blanchard and Roger Maris in the 8th and 9th innings. Maris had been hitless in the World Series before the game-winning home run. He was one of eight pitchers used by the Reds in a 13–5 loss in Game 5, pitching the 5th and 6th innings and allowing two unearned runs, as the Yankees took the Series four games to one. He had a 1.64 ERA in 11 innings pitched during the World Series.

Purkey peaked with a 23–5 season in 1962, with a 2.81 ERA (3rd best in the NL), while leading all NL pitchers with a 7.3 WAR (wins above replacement), and leading all major league pitchers with an .821 winning percentage. He also led the league in hitting batters with pitches (14). He finished 8th in voting for the National League's Most Valuable Player Award, and third in voting for the Cy Young Award. He was again named to both NL All-Star Teams in 1962, pitching two innings in the July 10 game, though not appearing in the July 30 game. The Reds finished 98–64, five games better than their 1961 pennant winning record, but still ended up 3.5 games behind the first place San Francisco Giants.

Purkey went into the 1963 season with a sore arm. He started 37 games in 1962 (the most of his career), completing 18; and had started 33 or 34 games every season for the Reds from 1958-1961. He pitched between 218-289 innings a year from 1958-62 (over 1,200 innings in total). In 1963, he started only 21 games, completing just four, with a 6–10 record and 3.55 ERA, pitching in only 137 innings.

Purkey improved in 1964, finishing 11–9 with a 3.04 ERA, starting 25 games and pitching 195.2 innings. After starting the season 4–6, he went 7–3 between August 4 and September 25, with five complete games and a shutout, during a heated pennant race between the Reds, Phillies and Cardinals which went down to the season's last game (the Cardinals winning the title when the Reds lost 10–0 to the Phillies). However, he was traded that December to the Cardinals in exchange for Roger Craig and outfielder Charlie James.

=== St. Louis and Pittsburgh ===
Purkey alternated between starting and relieving in 1965 (17 starts in 32 games), finishing the year with a 10–9 mark, but a team-worst 5.79 ERA, far above the league average 3.54 ERA. In April of 1966, the Cardinals sold his contract to the Pirates a few days before the 1966 season began. He ended his career that season with 10 relief appearances for Pittsburgh before being released in August. He roomed with rookie Steve Blass in his final season.

=== Career ===
Over a 13-season career, Purkey posted a 129-115 record with 793 strikeouts and an ERA of 3.79 in 386 appearances, including 276 starts, 92 complete games, 13 shutouts, 9 saves, and 2114 2/3 innings of work. Purkey was also known for throwing a knuckleball.

== Legacy and honors ==
In 1974, Purkey was inducted into the Reds Hall of Fame. Pirates pitcher Steve Blass reported that Hall of Fame hitter Roberto Clemente said Purkey was the toughest pitcher he ever faced. Blass himself said of Purkey "'I don't know a soul who didn't think the world of Bob Purkey. He was just really a gentleman who made friends with everybody.'"

== Personal life ==
Following his baseball career, Purkey worked briefly as a sportscaster for KDKA-TV in Pittsburgh, then opened a successful insurance business. Purkey had two children, Robert Jr. and Candy. Robert Jr. was pursuing his own baseball career in 1973, when he died of an undetected heart ailment at age 18.

== Death ==
Purkey died on March 16, 2008, at the age of 78 in his hometown of Pittsburgh, Pennsylvania following a battle with Alzheimer's disease. His wife Joan and son Robert Jr. predeceased him, and he was survived by his daughter Candy Holland. His wife Joan died in the same nursing home where Purkey resided, less than two months earlier on February 12, 2008.

== See also ==
- List of knuckleball pitchers

Awards and achievements
Preceded by Jim O'Toole	NL Player of the Month; May 1962	Succeeded by Sandy Koufax
