= Ellis Burton =

American baseball player (1936–2013)

- Outfielder
- Born: August 12, 1936; Los Angeles, California, U.S.
- Died: October 1, 2013 (aged 77); Fontana, California, U.S.
- Batted: Switch Threw: Right

MLB debut
- September 18, 1958, for the St. Louis Cardinals

Last MLB appearance
- September 4, 1965, for the Chicago Cubs

MLB statistics
- Batting average: .216
- Home runs: 17
- Runs batted in: 59
- Stats at Baseball Reference

Teams
- St. Louis Cardinals (1958, 1960); Cleveland Indians (1963); Chicago Cubs (1963–1965)

Ellis Narrington Burton (August 12, 1936 – October 1, 2013) was an American professional baseball center fielder who played for the St. Louis Cardinals, Cleveland Indians and Chicago Cubs over parts of five Major League Baseball (MLB) seasons. A switch-hitter who threw right-handed, Burton stood 5 feet 11 inches (1.80 m) tall and weighed 160 pounds (73 kg). He was born in Los Angeles, California.

He was selected in the Rule 5 draft by the Houston Colt .45s from the Toronto Maple Leafs on November 26, 1962.

Burton posted a .216 average with 17 home runs and 59 runs batted in in 215 Major League games, scoring 79 runs while stealing six bases.

During an eleven-year minor league career, he hit .274 and 169 home runs in 1,213 games, while playing from 1955 through 1965 for 10 different teams at four different levels.

== See also ==
- List of Major League Baseball ultimate grand slams
