= Bobby Tiefenauer =

American baseball player (1929–2000)

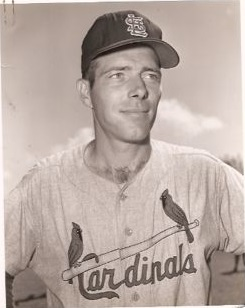
- Tiefenauer in 1961
- Pitcher
- Born: October 10, 1929; Desloge, Missouri, U.S.
- Died: June 13, 2000 (aged 70); Desloge, Missouri, U.S.
- Batted: Right Threw: Right

MLB debut
- July 14, 1952, for the St. Louis Cardinals

Last MLB appearance
- September 21, 1968, for the Chicago Cubs

MLB statistics
- Win–loss record: 9–25
- Earned run average: 3.84
- Strikeouts: 204
- Stats at Baseball Reference

Teams
- St. Louis Cardinals (1952, 1955); Cleveland Indians (1960); St. Louis Cardinals (1961); Houston Colt .45s (1962); Milwaukee Braves (1963–1965); New York Yankees (1965); Cleveland Indians (1965, 1967); Chicago Cubs (1968)

Bobby Gene Tiefenauer (October 10, 1929 – June 13, 2000) was an American professional baseball player and coach. A knuckleball relief pitcher, he pitched for six Major League teams during a ten-year MLB career that stretched between 1952 and 1968: the St. Louis Cardinals (1952, 1955, 1961), Cleveland Indians (1960, 1965–67), Houston Colt .45s (1962), Milwaukee Braves (1963–65), New York Yankees (1965) and Chicago Cubs (1968). Tiefenauer was born in Desloge, Missouri; he threw and batted right-handed and was listed as 6 feet 2 inches (1.88 m) tall and 190 pounds (86 kg).

Tiefenauer signed with the Cardinals in 1948, beginning his 21-year pitching career, but spent only two full seasons (1962 and 1964) on a major league roster. In 1964, with the Milwaukee Braves, he had one of his better seasons, saving 13 games (eighth best in the National League) with an earned run average of 3.21. All told, Tiefenauer worked in 179 MLB games pitched, exclusively as a relief pitcher. He posted a 9–25 won–lost mark, with 23 career saves. In 316 innings pitched, he allowed 312 hits and 87 bases on balls, with 212 strikeouts. His career ERA was 3.84.

Tiefenauer collected only one hit in 39 at-bats for a career batting average of .026. The hit occurred in the fourth inning of the game between the Houston Colt .45s and the San Francisco Giants on September 29, 1962, and it was an extra base hit, a double, struck off one of the best pitchers in baseball that year, Jack Sanford, who would win 24 games for the pennant-winning 1962 Giants. Tiefenauer pitched six innings in relief that day, and also came up to bat in the sixth inning when he grounded out to shortstop.

After his active career, Tiefenauer joined the Philadelphia Phillies' organization as a minor league pitching coach from 1970 into the 1980s, and served one year, 1979, as the bullpen coach on the Phils' MLB staff.

Tiefenauer enjoyed multiple brilliant seasons in the Triple-A International League during the late 1950s and early 1960s, posting a composite won–lost record of 49–15 over four seasons between 1958 and 1963. He was posthumously elected to the International League Hall of Fame in 2008.
