= Jim O'Toole =

American baseball player (1937–2015)

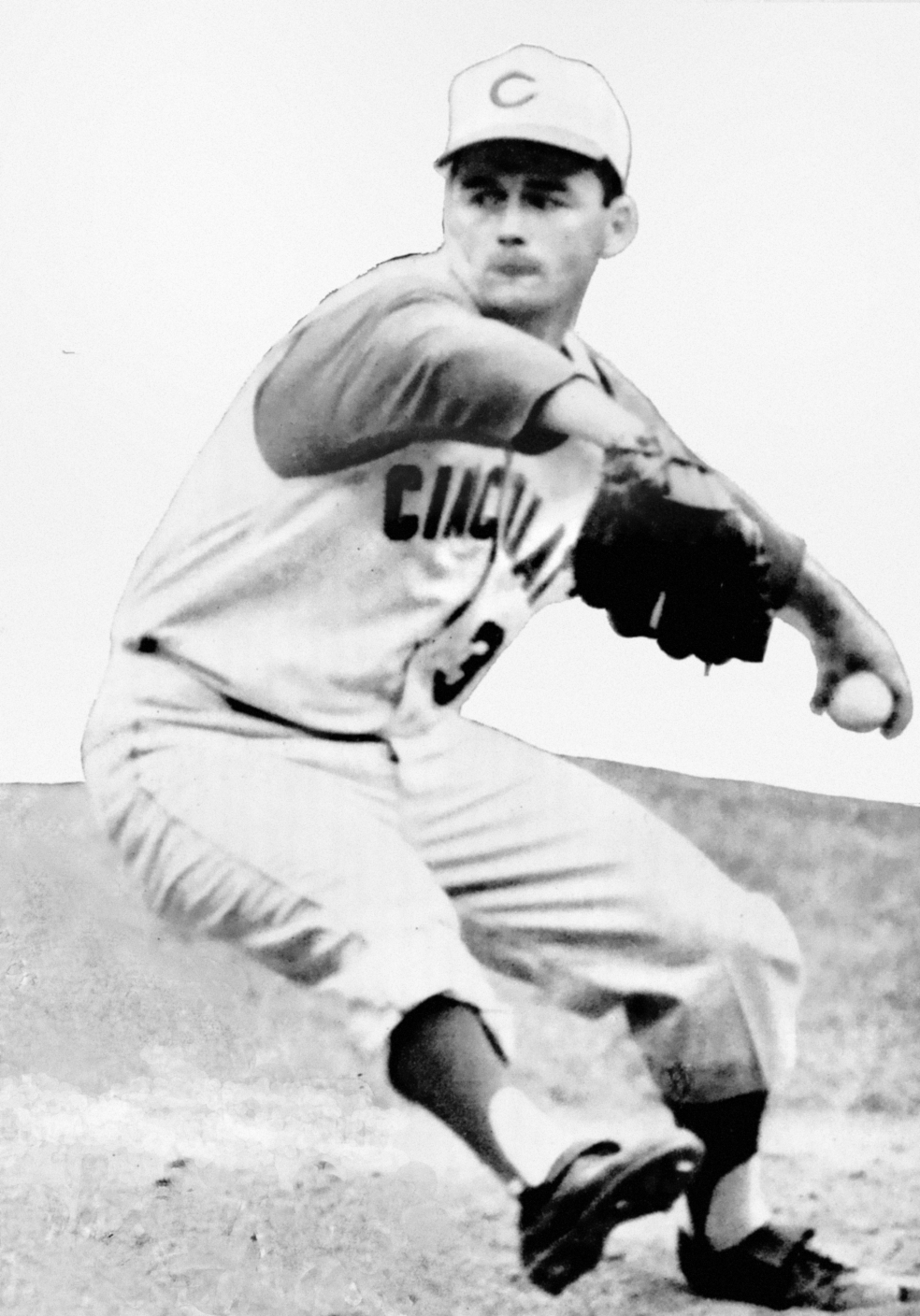
- Pitcher
- Born: January 10, 1937; Chicago, Illinois, U.S.
- Died: December 26, 2015 (aged 78); Cincinnati, Ohio, U.S.
- Batted: Switch Threw: Left

MLB debut
- September 26, 1958, for the Cincinnati Reds

Last MLB appearance
- July 22, 1967, for the Chicago White Sox

MLB statistics
- Win–loss record: 98–84
- Earned run average: 3.57
- Strikeouts: 1,039
- Stats at Baseball Reference

Teams
- Cincinnati Reds (1958–1966); Chicago White Sox (1967)

Career highlights and awards
- All-Star (1963); Cincinnati Reds Hall of Fame

James Jerome O'Toole (January 10, 1937 – December 26, 2015) was an American professional baseball pitcher. He played in Major League Baseball (MLB) for the Cincinnati Reds and Chicago White Sox during his 10-year career.

== Early life ==
O'Toole was born on January 10, 1937, on Chicago's South Side. His father was a Chicago policeman, who taught O'Toole how to box at a young age, and O'Toole eventually became a Golden Gloves boxer. He attended Chicago's Leo High School, which did not have a baseball team, and he played sandlot baseball as a teen. One of five children, his younger brother Denny O'Toole had a short major league baseball career.

== College and minor league ==
After graduating from Leo High School in 1955, O'Toole attended the University of Wisconsin–Madison on a baseball scholarship. After one year at Wisconsin, he had an 0–3 record. In the summer of 1957, he played semi-pro baseball in the Basin League for the Mitchell Kerns, where he had a 9–1 record. He was scouted by the Cincinnati Reds, and signed to play professional baseball for the Reds, including a $50,000 bonus.

In 1958, the Reds assigned him to the minor league Nashville Vols, where he led the Double-A Southern Association in wins (20), innings pitched, strikeouts and bases on balls. He had a 2.44 earned run average (ERA), and a 20–8 record in 280 innings pitched, with 189 strikeouts. He completed 21 of his 33 starts, with four shutouts. He was a starting pitcher in the Southern League All-Star Game.

== Cincinnati Reds ==
O'Toole was called up to the Reds at the end of September, 1958, and made his pitching debut on September 26, 1958. He was the starting pitcher against the Milwaukee Braves, in a 2–1 loss. (Less than one week later, the Braves were in the World Series against the New York Yankees.) He pitched seven innings, giving up only one earned run on four hits, against a lineup that included future Hall of Famers Hank Aaron, Eddie Mathews, and Red Schoendienst.

The Braves played their regular players to help pitcher Lew Burdette win his 20th game of the season. The young O’Toole pitched so well against the Braves that he was invited to appear on The Ed Sullivan Show to give the Yankees advice on how to pitch to the Braves in the World Series.

In 1959, he became a full-time player for the Reds after only one season of minor league baseball. He pitched in 28 games with 19 starts. O'Toole had 5–8 record with a 5.15 ERA his rookie year. He improved in 1960, with a 12–12 record in 38 starts, and 3.80 ERA.

The height of O'Toole's career fell between 1961-64, starting at least 30 games and pitching at least 220 innings in each of those years. From 1961–64, he won 19 (3.10 ERA), 16 (3.50 ERA), 17 (2.88 ERA) and 17 (2.66 ERA) games respectively for the Reds. In 1961, he was second in both wins (behind Warren Spahn and teammate Joey Jay) and ERA (behind Spahn) in the National League, fourth in strikeouts and pitchers WAR, and fifth in innings pitched. In 1962, he was 10th in wins, and 9th in wins in 1963. In 1964, he was 3rd in win-loss percentage (behind only future Hall of Fame pitchers Sandy Koufax and Juan Marichal), 6th in ERA, and 10th in WHIP and WAR for pitchers.

The Reds won the National League pennant in 1961, and met the Yankees in the 1961 World Series (losing 4–1). O'Toole was the opening day starter in the 1961 season. He played a crucial role in Cincinnati's 1961 National League championship. He, Jay and Bob Purkey led the starting pitching staff. O'Toole had a 19–9 record, the highest winning percentage among the three, and the lowest ERA at 3.10. Jay was 21–10 with a 3.53 ERA and Purkey was 16–12 with a 3.73 ERA. He was named Player of the Month for September with a 5–0 record, 2.53 ERA, and 37 strikeouts. He finished 10th in Most Valuable Player (MVP) voting.

Manager Fred Hutchison chose O'Toole to pitch Game 1 of the World Series. Though pitching effectively in the World Series, with an earned run average of 3.00, O'Toole lost his two decisions to Whitey Ford in games 1 and 4, as the New York Yankees bested the Reds in five games. Future Hall of Famer Ford was O'Toole's idol. He pitched seven innings in the first game, giving up only two runs, but Ford pitched a two-hit shutout. In Game 4, O'Toole pitched five innings, giving up two runs, but again the Reds were shut out.

In 1963, he was the starting pitcher for the National League in the Major League Baseball All-Star Game (his only appearance at the Summer Classic), pitching 2 innings and allowing 1 earned run, but was not involved in the decision. O'Toole later said that being selected as the starting pitcher by San Francisco Giants manager Alvin Dark was one of the proudest moments of his career.

In 1970, he was inducted into the Reds Hall of Fame.

== Chicago White Sox ==
O'Toole played in Cincinnati until his final season, 1967, spent with his hometown team, the Chicago White Sox, but was ineffective due to arm troubles. O'Toole tried to return with a 1969 expansion team, the Seattle Pilots, but was cut in spring training before the season began. Also on that new Pilots team was fellow pitcher and author Jim Bouton, who would describe how he was inspired by O'Toole's devotion to the game. Because after his major-league career was cut short, O'Toole went on to pitch for the Ross Eversoles team in the Kentucky Industrial League. "Would I do that?" Bouton wrote. "When it's over for me, would I be hanging with the Ross Eversoles?...and the answer I came up with was yes."

== Personal life ==
O'Toole married Betty Jane Wall, his high school sweetheart, on July 2, 1960. They had 11 children. At the time of his death, O'Toole had 33 grandchildren.

After his baseball career ended, O'Toole had a successful second career in Cincinnati real estate sales and remained active in the community, supporting charities and participating in local events including the 2015 St. Patrick's Day parade where he served as the grand marshal.

O'Toole died on December 26, 2015, from cancer in Cincinnati, Ohio at the age of 78.

Preceded by Warren Spahn	Major League Player of the Month; September, 1961	Succeeded by Bob Purkey
