= Juan Marichal =

Dominican baseball player (born 1937)

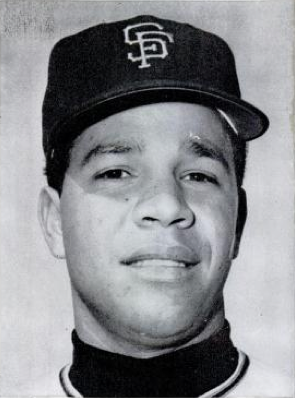
- Marichal with the San Francisco Giants in 1962
- Pitcher
- Born: October 20, 1937 (age 89); Laguna Verde, Dominican Republic
- Batted: Right Threw: Right

MLB debut
- July 19, 1960, for the San Francisco Giants

Last MLB appearance
- April 16, 1975, for the Los Angeles Dodgers

MLB statistics
- Win–loss record: 243–142
- Earned run average: 2.89
- Strikeouts: 2,303
- Stats at Baseball Reference

Teams
- San Francisco Giants (1960–1973); Boston Red Sox (1974); Los Angeles Dodgers (1975)

Career highlights and awards
- 10× All-Star (1962–1969, 1971); 2× NL wins leader (1963, 1968); MLB ERA leader (1969); Pitched a no-hitter on June 15, 1963; San Francisco Giants No. 27 retired; San Francisco Giants Wall of Fame

Member of the National

Baseball Hall of Fame
- Induction: 1983
- Vote: 83.7% (third ballot)

Juan Antonio Marichal Sánchez (born October 20, 1937), nicknamed "the Dominican Dandy", is a Dominican former right-handed pitcher who played 16 seasons in Major League Baseball (MLB) from 1960 to 1975, mostly with the San Francisco Giants. Known for his high leg kick, variety of pitches, arm angles and deliveries, pinpoint control, and durability, Marichal won 18 games to help the Giants reach the 1962 World Series, and went on to earn 191 victories in the 1960s, the most of any major league pitcher. He won over 20 games six times, on each occasion posting an earned run average (ERA) below 2.50 and striking out more than 200 batters, and became the first right-hander since Bob Feller to win 25 games three times. His 26 wins in 1968 remain a San Francisco era record.

Marichal led the National League (NL) in wins, innings pitched, complete games and shutouts twice each. He was often overshadowed by his contemporaries Sandy Koufax and Bob Gibson; in each of Marichal's four best seasons, either Koufax or Gibson won the Cy Young Award, always by unanimous vote. He pitched a no-hitter in June 1963, and two weeks later outdueled Warren Spahn for a 1–0 victory in 16 innings; Marichal also had three one-hitters–including one in his major league debut–and six two-hitters. One of the most outstanding performers in All-Star history, he was named to the team in nine seasons, recording an ERA of 0.50 in eight appearances and being named Most Valuable Player of the 1965 contest.

On August 22, 1965, Marichal was one of the principal figures in one of the most violent incidents in major league history. While batting in a heated game against the archrival Los Angeles Dodgers, he struck catcher John Roseboro in the head with his bat after Roseboro had thrown the ball back to the mound, brushing past Marichal's face; the blow opened a gash in Roseboro's head that required stitches, and set off a huge brawl between the teams. Marichal was suspended and received a then-record fine, also paying a financial settlement, but the two players later reconciled, and eventually became close friends. Roseboro would later lobby to get Marichal elected to the Baseball Hall of Fame after he failed to get elected on his first two ballots due to this incident. Marichal would later become a pallbearer at Roseboro's funeral.

Marichal's 243 wins, 2.84 ERA, 244 complete games and 3,444 innings pitched with the Giants are San Francisco team records; his 2,281 strikeouts, 446 games started and 52 shutouts with the club place him behind only Christy Mathewson in franchise history. At the time of his retirement, he ranked sixth in National League history in strikeouts (2,282) and shutouts (52); his 244 complete games ranked ninth among NL pitchers active after 1920. Marichal was inducted into the Baseball Hall of Fame in 1983; he was the first Dominican player and the first foreign-born player ever elected.

== Early life ==
Juan Antonio Marichal Sánchez was born on October 20, 1937, in the small farming village of Laguna Verde, Dominican Republic, the youngest of Francisco and Natividad Marichal's four children. He has two brothers, Gonzalo and Rafael, and a sister, Maria. His father died of an unknown illness when Marichal was three years old. His house did not have electricity, but food was plentiful since his family owned a farm. As a child, Marichal worked on the farm daily and was responsible for taking care of his family's horses, donkeys, and goats. He lived near the Yaque del Norte River and often spent time swimming and fishing. One day, while Marichal was playing by the river, he fell unconscious owing to poor digestion and was in a coma for nine days. Doctors did not expect him to survive, but he slowly regained consciousness after his family gave him steam baths under doctor's orders.

His older brother Gonzalo instilled a love of baseball in young Marichal and taught him the fundamentals of pitching, fielding, and batting. Every weekend, Marichal played the sport with his brother and friends. For their games, they found golf balls and paid the local shoemaker one peso to sew thick cloth around the ball to make it the proper size.They employed branches from a wassama tree for bats and canvas tarps for gloves. Among his childhood playmates were the Alou brothers, Felipe, Jesús, and Matty, who all later played with Marichal on the San Francisco Giants. From the age of six, Marichal aspired to become a professional baseball player, but his mother discouraged this, instead urging him to get an education. At the time, there were no players from the Dominican Republic in the major leagues, and his goal was viewed to be unrealistic. At age 11, he briefly held a job cutting sugarcane for the J.W. Tatem Shipping conglomerate.

In 1954, sixteen-year-old Marichal joined a summer league in Monte Cristi, playing for a team called Las Flores. Although he began as a shortstop, Marichal switched to pitching after taking inspiration from Bombo Ramos of the Dominican national team. He left high school after being recruited to play for the United Fruit Company team in 1956.

== Professional career ==
Marichal was discovered by Ramfis Trujillo, the son of late Dominican dictator Rafael Leónidas Trujillo. Ramfis was the primary sponsor of the Dominican Air Force Baseball Team (Aviación Dominicana), against which Marichal pitched a 2–1 victory in his native Monte Cristi. From the moment the game ended, Marichal was a member of Aviación Dominicana team, enlisted to the Air Force right on the spot by Ramfis's orders. He made his professional debut in 1958 with the Michigan City White Caps of the Midwest League and was named an all-star and the rookie of the year. He pitched his first season in the Dominican Professional Baseball League in 1958–59 for the Leones del Escogido and was named the rookie of the year. Marichal started and won the first game at Cheney Stadium in 1960, home of the new Tacoma Giants, the Giants AAA affiliate.

=== San Francisco Giants (1960–1973) ===
Marichal was promoted to the major leagues for the first time in July 1960. He entered the major leagues on July 19 as the second native pitcher to come from the Dominican Republic. He made an immediate impression: in his debut against the Philadelphia Phillies, he struck out Rubén Amaro to begin the game and retired the first 19 batters, then took a no-hitter into the eighth inning only to surrender a two-out single to Clay Dalrymple. He ended up with a one-hit shutout, walking one and striking out 12; his game score of 96 was the highest for any pitcher in his major league debut. He started 10 more games that season, finishing at 6–2 with a 2.66 ERA.

Injuries affected him in 1961, but he still made 27 starts and won 13 games for the Giants. On August 2, he threw another one-hitter, a 6-0 win at Dodger Stadium in which he struck out 11, allowing only a Tommy Davis single to lead off the fifth. In 1962, the Giants and Dodgers battled each other in a tight pennant race. A sprained ankle kept Marichal out of action between September 5 and 22, and the Giants lost his last two regularly scheduled starts of the year. The teams finished the season tied and faced off in a best-of-three tiebreaker series to determine the league champion. Starting the decisive Game 3, Marichal held the Dodgers to one run until the sixth, when Tommy Davis hit a two-run home run to give Los Angeles a 3–2 lead. When Marichal exited to start the bottom of the eighth, the Dodgers led 4–2, but San Francisco rallied in the ninth to win the game 6–4. In the World Series, Marichal started Game 4 with the Giants down 2 games to 1, and had a 2-0 lead through four innings. But while attempting to bunt in the top of the fifth, he smashed the thumb on his pitching hand, and was placed on the disabled list for the remainder of the Series. The Giants went on to win the game 7–3, but lost the Series in seven games.

After his 18-win campaign in 1962, Marichal finally cracked the 20-victory plateau in 1963, when he went 25–8 with 248 strikeouts and a 2.41 ERA. He appeared in every All-Star game of the 1960s beginning in 1962. On August 4, 1965, Marichal had a career-high 14 strikeouts in a 4-3, 10-inning road win over the Cincinnati Reds. In May 1966, he was named NL Player of the Month with a 6–0 record, a 0.97 ERA, and 42 strikeouts; he had pitched 31 consecutive scoreless innings between May 17 and May 31, including a 14-inning 1-0 shutout of the Phillies on May 26. On September 21 of that year, Marichal had perhaps the most remarkable moment of his batting career, hitting a walk-off home run off ace Pittsburgh Pirates reliever Roy Face for a 6-5 win; it was just the second of his four career home runs. On July 14, 1967, he surrendered the 500th home run of Eddie Mathews' career. On September 12, 1969, Marichal pitched his third one-hitter, a 1-0 win over the Reds in which the only hit was Tommy Helms' single to lead off the third; Helms was then caught stealing, with the only other baserunner being a sixth-inning walk.

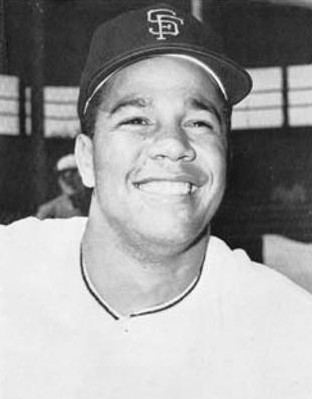
Marichal in 1965

From 1963 through 1969, Marichal had more than 20 victories in every season except 1967 and never posted an ERA higher than 2.76, which author James S. Hirsch calls one "of the finest pitching performances in history." He led the league in victories in 1963 and 1968, when he won 26 games. His 30 complete games paced the league, the most thrown by any pitcher in a season in the decade. In 1968, he also earned the highest position of his career in MVP voting, finishing fifth behind Bob Gibson, Pete Rose, Willie McCovey, and Curt Flood. He and Sandy Koufax were the only two major league pitchers in the post-war era (1946–present) to have more than one season of 25 or more wins, each having three.

Marichal won more games during the 1960s (191) than any other major league pitcher, but did not receive any votes for the Cy Young Award until 1970, when baseball writers started voting for the top three pitchers in each league rather than one per league (or, until 1967, only the top pitcher in the major leagues). Marichal finished in the top 10 in ERA seven consecutive years, from 1963 to 1969, in which year he led the league. During his career, he also finished in the top 10 in strikeouts six times, top 10 in innings pitched eight times (leading the league twice), and top 10 in complete games 10 times, with a career total of 244. He led the league twice in shutouts, throwing 10 of them in 1965.

Marichal exhibited exceptional control. He had 2,303 strikeouts with only 709 walks, a strikeout-to-walk ratio of 3.25. This ranks among the top 20 pitchers of all time, ahead of such notables as Bob Gibson, Steve Carlton, Sandy Koufax, Don Drysdale, Walter Johnson and Roger Clemens, who each have strikeout-to-walk ratios of less than 3:1. Over his career, Marichal led the league in the fewest walks per nine innings four times, and finished second three times – totaling eleven years in which he finished in the top 10, while also finishing in the top 10 for strikeouts six years.

=== Pitching duel with Spahn ===
Marichal dueled Warren Spahn, the 42-year-old Milwaukee Braves future Hall of Fame pitcher, in a night contest on July 2, 1963, at Candlestick Park in San Francisco, and the two great pitchers matched scoreless innings until Willie Mays homered off Spahn to win the game 1–0 in the 16th inning.

Both Spahn and Marichal tossed 15-plus inning complete games, something that had not happened before or since in the major leagues. Marichal allowed eight hits (all singles except for a double hit by Spahn) in the 16 innings, striking out 10, and saddling eventual career home run king Hank Aaron with an 0-for-6 collar. Spahn gave up nine hits in 15.1 innings, walking just one (Mays intentionally in the 14th, after Harvey Kuenn's leadoff double) and striking out two.

According to Marichal, manager Alvin Dark offered to take him out twice once the game reached the 12th inning. The second time, Marichal told Dark, "Do you see that man on the mound? That man is forty-two, and I'm twenty-five. I'm not ready for you to take me out." The game, almost the innings-duration of two contests, lasted only 4 hours, 10 minutes. By coincidence, future baseball commissioner Bud Selig attended the game as a fan.

=== Roseboro-Marichal incident ===
Marichal is also remembered for a notorious incident that occurred with John Roseboro during a game between the Giants and Los Angeles Dodgers at Candlestick Park on August 22, 1965. The Giants-Dodgers rivalry was, at the time, the fiercest in baseball — a rivalry that began when both teams still played in New York City.

As the 1965 season neared its climax, the Giants were involved in a tight pennant race, entering the game trailing the Dodgers by a game and a half while the Braves were one game behind the Dodgers. During the second game of the series two days earlier, Maury Wills was awarded first base after umpire Al Forman ruled that Giants catcher Tom Haller interfered with his swing; Haller claimed the Dodgers were holding their bats farther back than usual, and Matty Alou responded by doing the same, receiving a warning from Roseboro after his bat actually made contact with the Dodger catcher.

Wills led off the game with a bunt single off Marichal and scored on Ron Fairly's double. Marichal, a fierce competitor, viewed the bunt as a cheap way to get on base and took umbrage with Wills. When Wills came up to bat in the second inning, Marichal threw a pitch directly at him, sending him sprawling to the ground. Willie Mays then led off the bottom of the second inning for the Giants, and Dodgers pitcher Sandy Koufax threw a pitch over Mays' head as a token form of retaliation. In the top of the third inning with two out, Marichal threw a fastball that came close to hitting Fairly, prompting him to dive to the ground. Marichal's act angered the Dodgers, and home plate umpire Shag Crawford warned both teams that any further retaliations would not be tolerated.

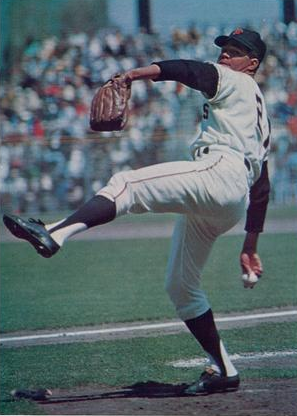
Marichal warming before a game, c. 1967

Marichal came to bat in the third inning expecting Koufax to throw at him. Instead, he was startled when, after the second pitch, Roseboro's return throw to Koufax either brushed his ear or came close enough for Marichal to feel the breeze off the ball. Marichal screamed "Why did you do that?" to Roseboro, who came out of his crouch with his fists clenched. Marichal later said he thought Roseboro was about to attack him. Giants captain Mays said Roseboro "brushed [Marichal]. Maybe it was a swing." Marichal raised his bat, striking Roseboro at least twice on the head, opening a two-inch gash that sent blood flowing down the catcher's face. Koufax raced in from the mound to attempt to separate them and was joined by the umpires, players and coaches from both teams.

A 14-minute brawl ensued on the field before Koufax, Mays and other peacemakers restored order. Marichal was ejected from the game, and afterwards, National League president Warren Giles suspended him for eight games (two starts), fined him a then-NL record US$1,750 (equivalent to $17,880 in 2025), and also forbade him from traveling to Dodger Stadium for the final, crucial two-game series of the season. Roseboro, who required 14 stitches for his wound, filed a $110,000 damage suit against Marichal one week after the incident, but eventually settled out of court for $7,500.

Many people thought Marichal's punishment was too lenient, since it would cost him only two starts. Fans booed him for the rest of the season whenever he pitched a road game. The Giants were in a tight pennant race with the Dodgers (as well as the Pirates, Reds and Braves) and the race was decided with only two games to play. The Giants, who ended up winning the August 22 game and were trailing by only a half-game afterward, eventually lost the pennant to the Dodgers by two games. Ironically, the Giants went on a 14-game win streak that started during Marichal's absence, and by then it was a two-team race as the Pirates, Reds and Braves fell further behind. But then the Dodgers won 15 of their final 16 games (after Marichal had returned) to win the pennant. Marichal won in his first game back, 2–1 vs. the Houston Astros on September 9 (the same day Koufax pitched his perfect game vs. the Chicago Cubs), but lost his last three decisions as the Giants slumped in the season's final week. "Marichal's actions might have cost us the pennant," Mays speculated, noting that the relief pitchers had to work more in the absence of Marichal, who usually completed his starts.

Marichal didn't face the Dodgers again until spring training on April 3, 1966. In his first at bat against Marichal since the incident, Roseboro hit a three-run home run. Later on, Giants general manager Chub Feeney approached Dodgers general manager Buzzie Bavasi to attempt to arrange a handshake between Marichal and Roseboro. However, Roseboro declined the offer.

Years later, in his memoirs, Roseboro stated that he was retaliating for Marichal's having thrown at Wills. He took matters into his own hands as he did not want to risk Koufax being ejected and possibly being suspended for retaliating while the Dodgers were in the middle of a close pennant race. He stated that his throwing close to Marichal's ear was "standard operating procedure", as a form of retribution. After years of bitterness, Roseboro and Marichal became close friends in the 1980s, getting together occasionally at old-timers' games, golf tournaments and charity events.

=== 1970–1975 ===
In 1970, Marichal experienced a severe reaction to penicillin which led to back pain and chronic arthritis. His career stumbled that year, as he only posted 12 wins and his ERA shot up to 4.12; he did, however, pick up his 200th career victory on August 28 with a 5-1 win over the Pirates, evening his record at 9-9 with his sixth straight win. He recovered with a stellar 1971 season in which he won 18 games and his ERA again dropped below 3.00; he recorded his 2,000th strikeout on May 10 in a 3-2 win over the Reds, retiring Lee May in the ninth inning. It was the only season in which Marichal earned any consideration for the Cy Young Award, finishing in 8th place. The Giants returned to the playoffs for the first time since 1962, winning the NL West division and facing the Pirates in the NL Championship Series. Marichal started the third game in Pittsburgh with the series tied at one game each; he pitched well, limiting Pittsburgh's offense to solo home runs by Bob Robertson and Richie Hebner. However, the Giants managed only one unearned run, losing the game 2–1 before losing the series three games to one.

1971 would turn out to be Marichal's final strong season and the last time he would be selected to the All-Star Game. In 1972, he got off to a 1–6 start, finishing the year with a 6–16 record, his first losing season.

=== Boston Red Sox (1974) ===
After posting an 11–15 record in 1973, Marichal's contract was sold to the Boston Red Sox on December 8.

Marichal had some success in 1974; he started the season with a 2-1 record but an ERA of 7.16 in mid-May before arm and back problems sidelined him. He returned in August, winning three more games and lowering his ERA to 4.12, but could not make it past the third inning in his two September starts; he was released after the season with a 5–1 record and 4.87 ERA in 11 starts, his last win being a 2-1 road victory over the Oakland Athletics on August 11.

=== Los Angeles Dodgers (1975) ===
Marichal then signed with the Dodgers as a free agent.

Dodger fans had never forgiven Marichal for his attack on Roseboro 10 years earlier, and it took a personal appeal from Roseboro to calm them down. However, Marichal's 1975 didn't last long; he was lit up for nine runs, 11 hits and a 13.50 ERA in only two starts, again not making it past the fourth inning, before retiring less than two weeks into the season. He finished his career with 243 victories, 142 losses, 244 complete games, 2,303 strikeouts and a 2.89 ERA over 3,507 innings pitched. His 243 wins were the most by a foreign-born pitcher in over half a century, and he held virtually every career record for Latin American pitchers before most of them were broken by Luis Tiant and Dennis Martínez. He played in the 1962 World Series against the New York Yankees (one start, with no decision) and the 1971 National League Championship Series against the Pirates (losing his only start). Between 1962 and 1971, the Giants averaged 90 wins a season, and Marichal averaged 20 wins a year.

=== No-hitter and All-Star performances ===
Marichal pitched a no-hitter on June 15, 1963, a 1-0 shutout of the Houston Colt .45s; he retired the first 14 hitters, allowing only a pair of walks, and struck out Brock Davis to close out the win. Chuck Hiller's eighth-inning RBI double provided the game's only scoring.

He was named to nine All-Star teams, and was voted the Most Valuable Player of the 1965 game in Minneapolis, in which he pitched three shutout innings to begin the game and faced the minimum nine batters, giving up one hit before a double play. His overall All-Star Game record was 2–0 with a 0.50 ERA in eight appearances, facing 62 batters in 18 total innings, second-most in innings pitched only to Don Drysdale (19.1 innings; 2–1, 1.40 ERA and 69 batters faced).

==== Career statistics ====
Category	W	L	ERA	GS	CG	SHO	SV	IP	HR	BB	IBB	SO	HBP	WHIP	FIP	ERA+	Ref.
Total	243	142	2.89	457	244	52	2	3,507	320	709	82	2,303	40	1.101	3.04	123	

== Pitching style ==
Unlike Koufax and Gibson, both of whom were power pitchers, Marichal was a finesse pitcher who developed pinpoint control early in his career. He threw five pitches – fastball, slider, changeup, curveball, and screwball – for strikes in three different angles: over the top, three-quarters, or sidearm, giving him a wide-ranging repertoire.

Marichal was known for his high leg kick delivery which allowed him to conceal the type of pitch until it was delivered. The high left leg kick went nearly vertical (even more so than Warren Spahn's delivery). He maintained this delivery his entire career, the kick only slightly diminished as he neared retirement.

== Honors ==
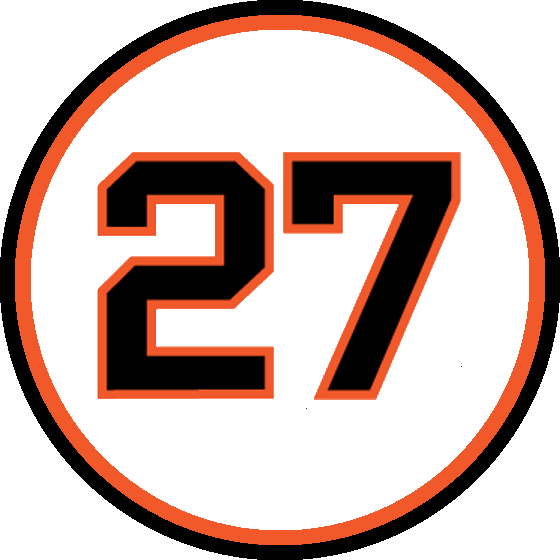
Juan Marichal's number 27 was retired by the San Francisco Giants in 1975.

Marichal fell short of election to the Baseball Hall of Fame during his first two years of eligibility, coming within seven votes in 1982, by all accounts because the Baseball Writers' Association of America voters still held his attack on Roseboro against him. However, after a personal appeal by Roseboro, Marichal was elected in 1983, and thanked Roseboro in his induction speech. When Roseboro died in 2002, Marichal served as an honorary pallbearer at his funeral and told the gathered, "Johnny's forgiving me was one of the best things that happened in my life. I wish I could have had John Roseboro as my catcher."

In 1975, the Giants retired Marichal's uniform number 27. In 1999, he ranked #71 on The Sporting News' list of the 100 Greatest Baseball Players, and was a finalist for the Major League Baseball All-Century Team.

In 2005, Marichal was honored before a game with a statue outside SBC Park's (as it was known then) "Lefty O'Doul" entrance. The Giants also honored him by wearing jerseys that said "Gigantes", the Spanish word for "Giants" during the series.

On July 20, 2003, Marichal was inducted into the Hispanic Heritage Baseball Museum Hall of Fame in a pregame on-field ceremony at Pac Bell Park. In 2005, he was named one of the three starting pitchers on Major League Baseball's Latino Legends Team.

In 2015, the Estadio Quisqueya in his home country was renamed Estadio Quisqueya Juan Marichal after him. The following year, a statue of Marichal was unveiled outside the stadium.

== Personal life ==
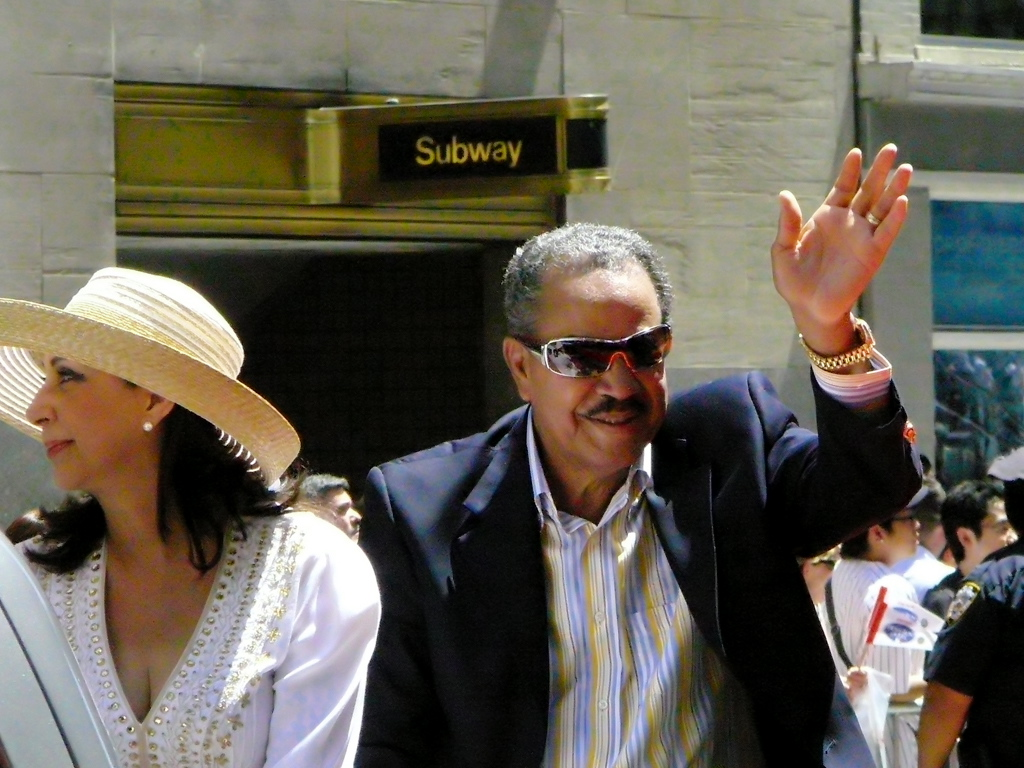
Marichal at the 2008 MLB All-Star Game Parade.

In the early 1960s, Marichal became engaged to Alma Rosa Carvajal. Following the assassination of Rafael Trujillo in 1961, the Dominican Republic was thrown into chaos and conditions became dangerous. Marichal, in spring training at the time, sought to return to his home country in order to bring Alma back with him to the United States. His manager, Alvin Dark, not only consented to Marichal leaving camp, but even gave the pitcher two plane tickets.

Upon returning to the States with his fiancé, Marichal married Carvajal in March 1962. Together, they had six children: Rosie, Elsie, Yvette, Ursula Raquel, Charlene, and Juan Antonio.

Since retirement, Marichal lives in the Dominican Republic where he owns a farm. He travels frequently to the United States and has worked in baseball in various capacities. From 1996 to 2000, he served in the cabinet of Dominican Republic President Leonel Fernández as Minister of Sports and Physical Education.

== See also ==
- List of Afro-Latinos
- List of Major League Baseball annual ERA leaders
- List of Major League Baseball annual wins leaders
- List of Major League Baseball annual shutout leaders
- List of Major League Baseball career wins leaders
- List of Major League Baseball career strikeout leaders
- List of Major League Baseball career WHIP leaders
- List of Major League Baseball career shutout leaders
- List of Major League Baseball career putouts as a pitcher leaders
- List of Major League Baseball no-hitters
- List of Major League Baseball retired numbers
- List of Major League Baseball players from the Dominican Republic

== Book sources ==
- Hirsch, James S. (2010). Willie Mays: The Life, the Legend. Scribner. ISBN 978-1-4165-4790-7.
- Marichal, Juan; Freedman, Lew (2011). Juan Marichal: My Journey from the Dominican Republic to Cooperstown. MVP Books. ISBN 978-0-7603-4059-2.
- Rosengren, John (2014). The Fight of Their Lives: How Juan Marichal and John Roseboro Turned Baseball's Ugliest Brawl into a Story of Forgiveness and Redemption. Lyons Press. ISBN 978-0-7627-8847-7.

Awards and achievements
Preceded by Sam Jones; Jack Sanford	San Francisco Giants Opening Day; Starting pitcher 1962; 1964–1969	Succeeded by Jack Sanford; Gaylord Perry
Preceded by Don Nottebart	No-hitter pitcher June 15, 1963	Succeeded by Ken Johnson
Preceded by Willie Mays	Major League Player of the Month; May 1966	Succeeded by Gaylord Perry
