= Pee Wee Reese =

American baseball player (1918–1999)

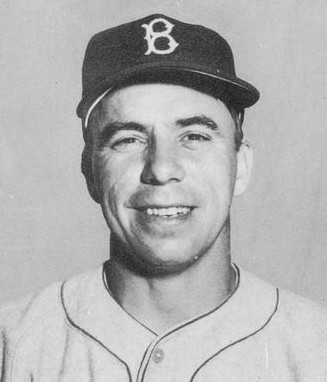
- Reese with the Brooklyn Dodgers in 1956
- Shortstop
- Born: July 23, 1918; Ekron, Kentucky, U.S.
- Died: August 14, 1999 (aged 81); Louisville, Kentucky, U.S.
- Batted: Right Threw: Right

MLB debut
- April 23, 1940, for the Brooklyn Dodgers

Last MLB appearance
- September 26, 1958, for the Los Angeles Dodgers

MLB statistics
- Batting average: .269
- Hits: 2,170
- Home runs: 126
- Runs batted in: 885
- Stats at Baseball Reference

Teams
- Brooklyn / Los Angeles Dodgers (1940–1942, 1946–1958)

Career highlights and awards
- 10× All-Star (1942, 1946–1954); 2× World Series champion (1955, 1959); NL stolen base leader (1952); Los Angeles Dodgers No. 1 retired

Member of the National

Baseball Hall of Fame
- Induction: 1984
- Vote: Veterans Committee

Harold Peter Henry "Pee Wee" Reese (July 23, 1918 – August 14, 1999) was an American professional baseball player. He played in Major League Baseball (MLB) as a shortstop for the Brooklyn / Los Angeles Dodgers from 1940 to 1958. A ten-time All-Star, Reese contributed to seven National League championships for the Dodgers and was inducted into the Baseball Hall of Fame in 1984.

Reese is well known for his support of his teammate Jackie Robinson, the first Black player in the major leagues' modern era, who faced widespread racist backlash upon being promoted from the Negro leagues to the major leagues. This support is commonly exemplified with a story of Reese's response to escalating harassment of Robinson that had been taking place during a pre-game warmup in 1947. In this story, Reese walked from his standard position on the field to Robinson's position in the infield and put his arm around Robinson's shoulder. While the details of the incident are possibly apocryphal, it is considered representative of Reese's pattern of public acts of camaraderie towards Robinson, which gestured inclusion and acceptance of his teammate within a prejudiced societal context.

== Early life ==
Reese's nickname originated in his childhood, as he was a champion marbles player (a "pee wee" is a small marble). Reese was born in Ekron, Meade County, Kentucky, and raised there until he was nearly eight years old, when his family moved to Louisville. In high school, Reese was so small that he did not play baseball until his senior year, at which time he weighed only 120 pounds and played just six games as a second baseman. He graduated from duPont Manual High School in 1935, where he played for a legendary coach, Ralph Kimmel. He worked as a cable splicer for the Louisville phone company, only playing amateur baseball in a church league. When Reese's team reached the league championship, the minor league Louisville Colonels allowed them to play the championship game on their field. Reese impressed Colonels owner Cap Neal, who signed him to a contract for a $200 bonus. While playing for the Colonels, he was affectionately referred to by his teammates as "The Little Colonel".

== Baseball career ==
By 1938, Reese was the Colonels' regular shortstop and one of the top prospects in the minors; Boston Red Sox farm director Billy Evans was so impressed by Reese that he recommended the Red Sox buy the team. Evans and owner Tom Yawkey both knew that Boston's regular shortstop, Joe Cronin, was nearing the end of his career.

However, Cronin was also the team's manager, and still thought of himself as a regular shortstop. When Yawkey sent Cronin to Louisville to scout Reese, Cronin realized that he was scouting his own replacement. Cronin deliberately downplayed Reese's talent and suggested Reese be traded. It took a while to find a buyer, since the other teams assumed something had to be wrong with Reese if the Red Sox wanted to get rid of him. However, on July 18, 1939, Reese was sent to Brooklyn for $35,000 and four players to be named later. This trade is now considered one of the most lopsided deals in baseball history. As it turned out, Cronin was only a part-time player after 1941.

Reese stayed in Louisville for the rest of the 1939 season, and was called up to Brooklyn in time for the 1940 season. In an ironic twist, he walked into a situation where his manager was also the regular shortstop—in this case, Leo Durocher. Unlike Cronin, however, Durocher was willing to give up his spot in the lineup to Reese.

=== Early playing career ===
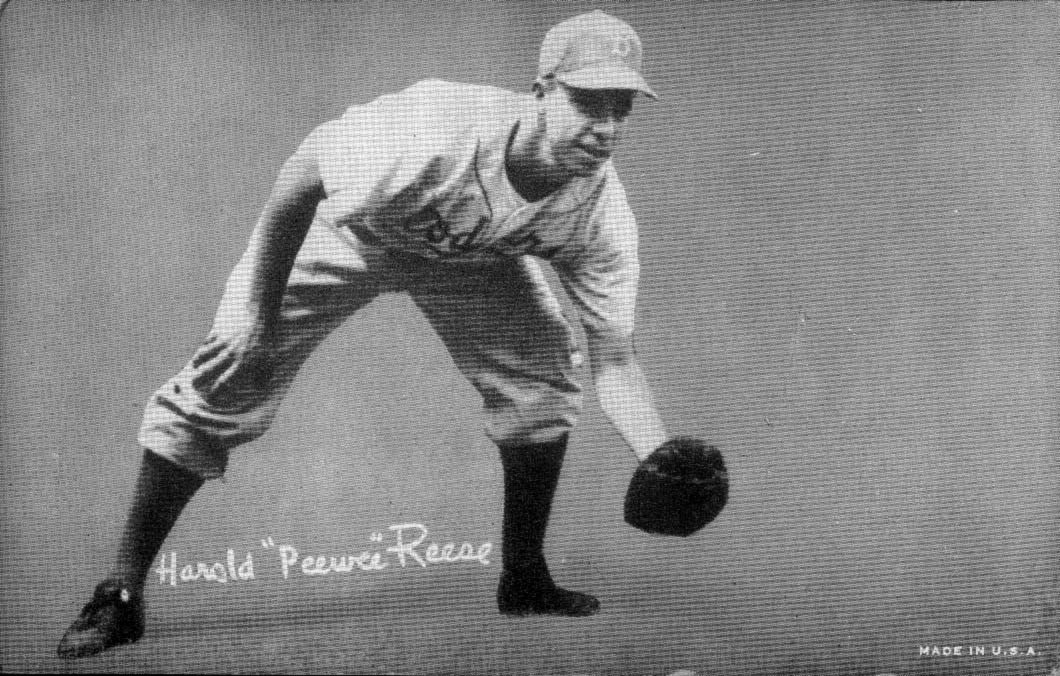
Reese with the Dodgers

Reese's rookie season in 1940 was curtailed by a broken heel bone that limited him to 84 games in what had looked to be a promising season (.272 batting average with 58 runs scored). He had a thrilling moment that year, hitting a grand slam in the bottom of the ninth inning to beat the New York Giants. In 1941, he hit .229 and led the league with 47 errors. Even playing in the World Series that year was a forgettable experience for Reese, as he batted .200 and made three errors in the five-game Yankee win. It was in the 1942 campaign that he truly established himself, making the National League All-Star team for the first of ten consecutive years and leading National League shortstops in both putouts and assists.

Like many players of his era, he missed three seasons due to military service. Reese enlisted in the United States Navy in 1943 and shipped out to fight in the Pacific theater of World War II. He played on the Aiea Naval Hospital baseball team while stationed in Hawaii. With Reese in the service, the Dodgers languished, finishing no better than third place and as poorly as 42 games out (in seventh place) in 1943. Upon his return in 1946, Reese immediately righted the ship as the Dodgers battled the St. Louis Cardinals in a tight pennant race. The two teams ended the season tied for first place and met in the 1946 National League tie-breaker series. It was the first playoff tiebreaker in Major League Baseball history. The Cardinals won the first two games of the best-of-three-game series to capture the National League pennant.

=== Jackie Robinson ===
In 1947, some Dodgers players began circulating a petition when word spread that Brooklyn intended to bring Jackie Robinson up from their farm team in Montreal. The players assumed that Reese, who grew up in Louisville, Kentucky, would sign. According to sportswriter Roger Kahn, who later became close friends with Reese, the petition essentially said, "If you bring up the nigger, trade us. We won't play." However, the popular Reese refused to sign the petition and it died. When a sportswriter asked Reese if he felt threatened by Robinson taking his position of shortstop, Reese simply responded, "If he can take my job, he's entitled to it."

Reese was one of the few welcoming to Robinson, who endured horrible abuse from the crowds and fellow players, including pitchers who threw directly at his head and players who berated him with racial slurs. After spending a day with the Dodgers in 1947, sportswriter Jimmy Cannon concluded that, "Robinson is the loneliest man I have ever seen in sports."

When Robinson joined the Dodgers in 1947 and traveled with them during their first road trip, he was heckled by fans in Cincinnati. During pre-game infield practice at Crosley Field (the then-home of the Cincinnati Reds), Reese, the captain of the team, went over to Robinson, engaged him in conversation, and put his arm around his shoulder in a gesture of support that silenced the crowd. (According to a 2013 article on ESPN, Brian Cronin argues that the incident actually occurred in 1948 in Boston.)

In response to Dodgers teammate Pete Reiser's comment about how democracy technically means that everybody's equal, Reese said "Well that's true, but Jackie is catching special hell because he's the only black player. Maybe we ought to do something to make it more equal.” According to American journalist Lester Rodney, the moment of solidarity between Robinson and Reese in Cincinnati sparked a gradual decline in vile fan behavior by 1948. Rodney reported "You began to get that feeling that the racists knew they were in the minority, and they may still be racist to the core but at least their mouths were shut! And you never heard them again."

The gesture is depicted in a bronze sculpture of Reese and Robinson, created by sculptor William Behrends, which was placed at MCU Park in Brooklyn and unveiled on November 1, 2005. In a 2005 article, New York Times columnist Bob Herbert highlighted Kahn's statement that Reese's gesture to Jackie Robinson is "Baseball's finest moment".

Throughout that difficult first year in the major leagues, Reese helped keep Robinson's morale up amid all the abuse. As the 1947 season wore on, there was tacit acceptance of the fact that Black players would now have an active, permanent presence in big league baseball. Reese became good friends with Robinson and was able to use humor to alleviate some of the tension and make Robinson laugh. Robinson still got pitches thrown at him, but, as Reese recounted to Kahn, "I told him, 'You know Jack, some of these guys are throwing at you because you're Black. But others are doing it just because they plain don't like you.'" His role in nurturing Jackie Robinson aside, 1947 was a superb year for Reese, as he batted .284 with a league-leading 104 walks. He also had a career best slugging average of .426. Their rapport soon led shortstop Reese and second baseman Robinson to become one of the most effective defensive pairs in the sport's history. The friendship between Reese and Robinson is prominent in Roger Kahn's classic 1972 work, The Boys of Summer.

The reason behind Reese's passive attitude towards race is not entirely known, though some stories suggest that he was taught about the evils of racism at a young age when his father took him to a tree where a lynching had occurred.

When Robinson died in 1972, Reese was one of the pallbearers at his funeral.

=== Later career ===
Pee Wee helped make my boyhood dream come true to play in the majors, the World Series. When Pee Wee reached out to Jackie, all of us in the Negro League smiled and said it was the first time that a white guy had accepted us. When I finally got up to Brooklyn, I went to Pee Wee and said, "Black people love you. When you touched Jackie, you touched all of us." With Pee Wee, it was No. 1 on his uniform and No. 1 in our hearts.

— Joe Black, another Black major league baseball pioneer, at Reese's funeral.

In 1949, Reese had his only league lead in a significant batting category, topping all National Leaguers with 132 runs scored. The Dodgers won the pennant again that year, but the Yankees continued to dominate in the World Series, winning in five games despite Reese's .316 Series average and team-leading five hits.

Reese became the Dodgers' team captain in 1950. In 1951, he had his career high in RBI, with 84. In 1952, he led the National League in stolen bases with 30. That year, Reese had his best Series, batting .345 with 10 hits, one home run and four RBI. In Game 3, Robinson and Reese pulled off a double steal; both later scored on a passed ball.

The 1953 Dodgers won the National League pennant with a mark of 105–49 for a .682 winning percentage. Reese was a mainstay for the team, with 108 runs scored and a .271 batting average. The Yankees, however, again defeated the Dodgers in the 1953 World Series, four games to two. After the season, the Dodgers offered Reese the position of manager; when Reese declined the promotion, the Dodgers hired Walter Alston, who remained manager for more than two decades.

In 1954, Reese batted .309, the only season he hit over .300. Though 36 years old, he was still going strong during the 1955 season, scoring 99 runs. In that year, the Dodgers won their first World Series. Reese had two RBI in Game 2. In Game 7, he singled and scored an insurance run. While on the field, he doubled Gil McDougald off first base after Sandy Amorós made a sensational catch of a Yogi Berra fly ball in left field and relayed the throw to Reese to help preserve the victory.

In 1957, Reese yielded his starting role to another Black ballplayer, Charlie Neal. As the Dodgers moved west in 1958, Reese joined them as a backup infielder, retiring that year after batting .224 in 59 games. He coached for the Dodgers in the 1959 season, earning a second World Series ring.

== Career statistics ==
In a 16-year major league career, Reese played in 2,166 games, accumulating 2,170 hits in 8,058 at bats for a .269 career batting average along with 126 home runs, 885 runs batted in and an on-base percentage of .366. He retired with a .962 fielding percentage. In 44 World Series games, he batted .272 (46-for-169) with 20 runs, two home runs and 16 RBI.

Other than his Navy time between 1943 and 1945, Reese had no breaks in service and played at least 140 games in every year from 1941 to 1956. Consistently productive, he scored at least 75 runs from 1942 through 1956 and amassed 1,338 lifetime, best of any Dodger. Though he never won a Most Valuable Player Award, eight times he ranked in the top ten of the Most Valuable Player Award balloting. He also was a home run threat during a time when shortstops seldom hit home runs. Reese amassed 252 stolen bases in a period when steals were not an integral part of the game. Defensively, he was an outstanding gloveman, leading National League shortstops four times in putouts and ranking in the top 10 all-time in putouts and double plays.

One of the most popular players with both his teammates and the fans, the "Little Colonel" was the Dodgers' team captain, and he, not the manager, brought out the line-up card at the start of their games. Reese and Elston Howard have the dubious distinction of playing on the most losing World Series teams (six each). Reese's only World Series win as a player, with the Dodgers in the 1955 World Series, occurred against Howard's New York Yankees during Howard's first World Series. No other non-Yankee ballplayer has appeared in that many World Series for the same team.

== Broadcasting career ==
Reese, with Roy Campanella and Don Zimmer in a television commercial for Gillette razors, ca. 1956

Following his retirement as a player, Reese enjoyed considerable success as a baseball play-by-play announcer and color commentator. He called Game of the Week telecasts on CBS from 1960 to 1965 (with Dizzy Dean) and for NBC from 1966 to 1968 (with Curt Gowdy). Reese also broadcast the 1967 and 1968 World Series for NBC Radio, called Cincinnati Reds telecasts in 1969–1970, and served as a part-time television analyst for the Montreal Expos in 1972.

== Later life and death ==
In his later years, Reese was employed at Hillerich & Bradsby, makers of Louisville Slugger baseball bats. He battled prostate and lung cancer during the final years of his life, and died on August 14, 1999, at his Louisville home. He is interred at Resthaven Memorial Park Cemetery in Louisville.

== Awards and honors ==
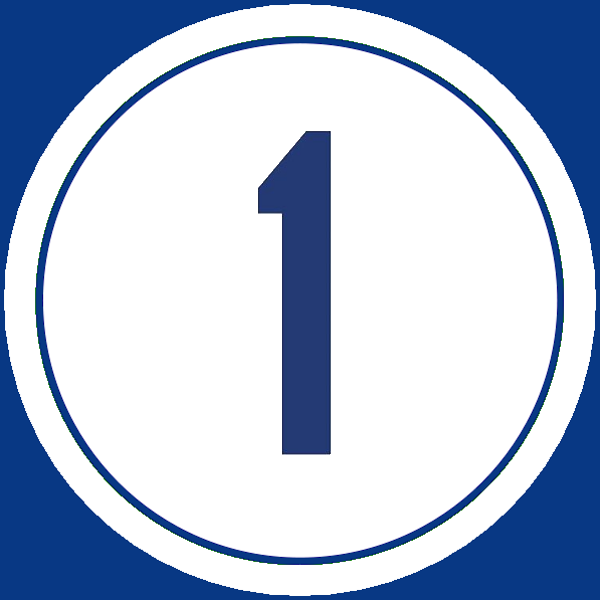
Pee Wee Reese's number 1 was retired by the Los Angeles Dodgers in 1984.

In 1984, Reese was inducted into the National Baseball Hall of Fame and Museum along with Rick Ferrell. On his entry, his support of Jackie Robinson was cited as well as his playing performance as a testament to his worthiness of the Hall.

A statue of Reese was erected in front of the main entrance of Louisville Slugger Field in 2000 and his number was retired by the Louisville Bats.

A statue of Reese and Jackie Robinson was erected in Brooklyn, New York in November 2005, in front of KeySpan Park (now Maimonides Park) where the Brooklyn Cyclones (high-A affiliate of the New York Mets) play. Their widows both attended the ceremony for the statue which memorializes the gesture of Reese and his teammates overcoming the racial barrier.

Reese was presented with the "SABR Hero of Baseball Award" at the Society for American Baseball Research's June 1997 national convention at Louisville, Kentucky.

In 2013, the Bob Feller Act of Valor Award honored Reese as one of 37 Baseball Hall of Fame members for his service in the United States Navy during World War II.

== Personal life ==
Reese married Dorothy "Dottie" Walton on March 29, 1942; she outlived him by nearly 13 years. They had two children. Dottie died on March 7, 2012, just 22 days away from what would have been the couple's Platinum wedding anniversary. His son, Mark, has made sports documentaries in Los Angeles over the past 25 years.

== In popular culture ==
- In the 1987 movie The Brave Little Toaster, Radio mentions him in a line of dialogue.
- In the 2013 film 42, Reese is played by Lucas Black. The moment when he put his arm around Robinson is also depicted.
- Comics – The Chabad Lubavitch Hasidic movement commissioned a comic strip featuring a character based on Pee Wee Reese, the style of the strip was in the visual style of Chester Gould's Dick Tracy.

== See also ==
- List of Major League Baseball career hits leaders
- List of Major League Baseball career runs scored leaders
- List of Major League Baseball career stolen bases leaders
- List of Major League Baseball annual runs scored leaders
- List of Major League Baseball annual stolen base leaders
- List of Major League Baseball players who spent their entire career with one franchise
- List of people from the Louisville metropolitan area

Preceded by Joe Garagiola	Lead color commentator, Major League Baseball on NBC; 1966–1968	Succeeded by Tony Kubek
