= Statue of Willie McCovey =

Statue in San Francisco, California, USA

Coordinates: 37.77659°N 122.38755°W

- The statue in 2024
- Artist: William Behrends
- Year: 2003
- Subject: Willie McCovey
- Location: Oracle Park San Francisco, California, U.S.

A statue of Baseball Hall of Fame player Willie McCovey was installed in McCovey Cove, San Francisco. It was unveiled in 2003 and was created by sculptor William Behrends.

The statue was removed by San Francisco Giants and put into storage in July 2020 to keep it safe from any possible damage from construction work going on nearby. It was put back on display at a new location just before the 2024 season.
