= Oracle Park =

Baseball park in San Francisco, United States

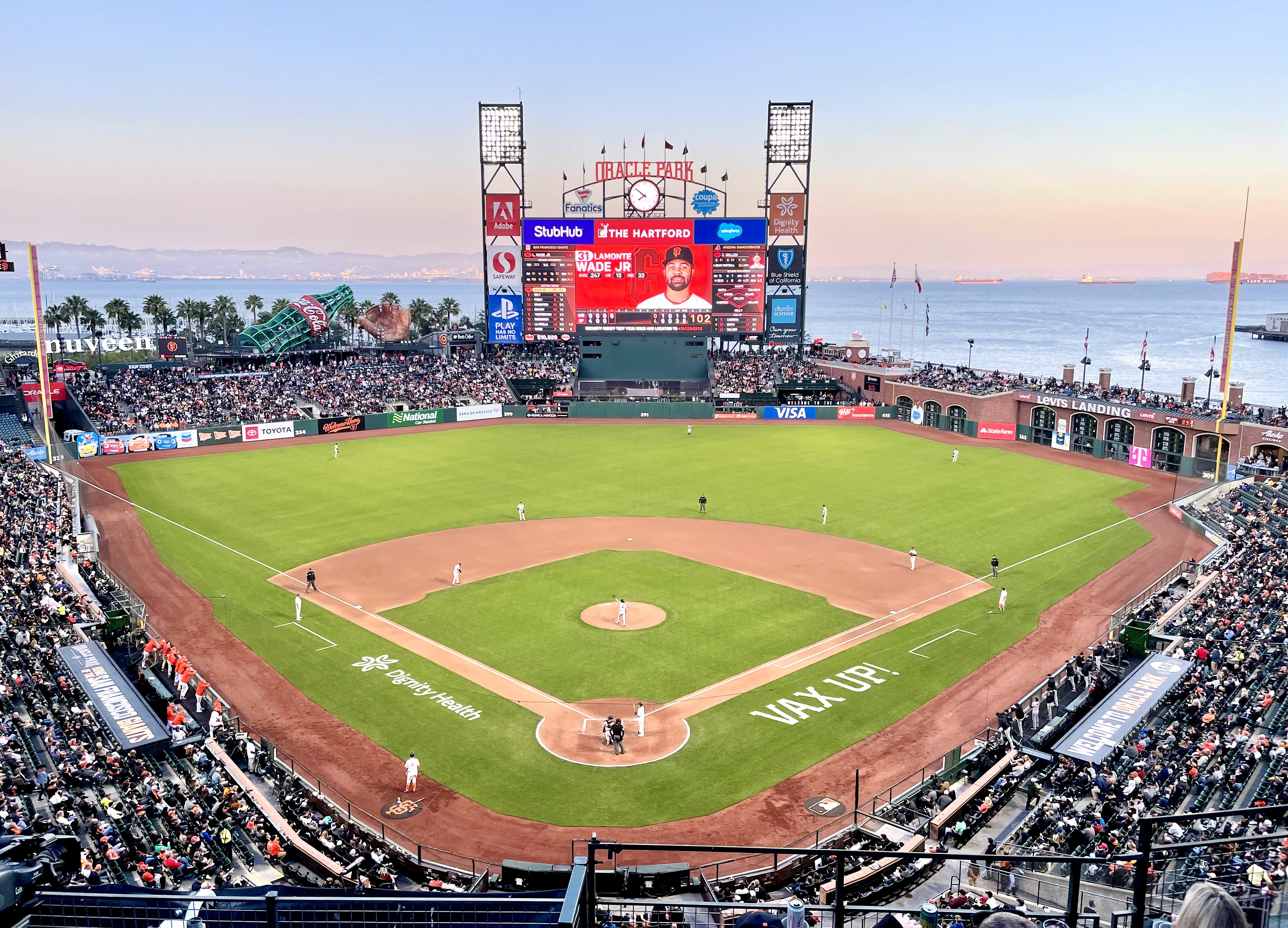
- Oracle Park in 2021

- Location in San Francisco Location in California Location in the United States
- Former names: Pacific Bell Park (2000–2003); SBC Park (2004–2005); AT&T Park (2006–2018)
- Address: 24 Willie Mays Plaza
- Location: San Francisco, California, U.S.
- Coordinates: 37°46′43″N 122°23′21″W
- Owner: Port of San Francisco
- Operator: San Francisco Baseball Associates LP
- Capacity: Baseball: 41,331 (2021–present); 41,314 (2020); 41,915 (2007–2019); 41,606 (2006); 41,584 (2005); 41,503 (2003–2004); 41,059 (2001–2003); 40,930 (2000); 1,500 standing-room capacity NCAA Football: 45,000 (2011) Rugby sevens: 42,000
- Surface: Tifway 419 Bermuda Grass
- Record attendance: 44,046 (2010 NLDS Game 2)
- Field size: Left field line – 339 feet (103 m); Left field – 354 feet (108 m); Left-center field – 399 feet (122 m); Center field – 391 feet (119 m); Right-center field – 415 feet (126 m); Right field – 365 feet (111 m); Right field line – 309 feet (94 m); Backstop – 48 feet (15 m) Fence height Left Field – 8 feet (2 m); Center Field – 7 feet (2 m); Dead Center Field – 10 feet (3 m); Right-Center Field – 20 feet (6 m); Right Field – 24 feet (7 m)
- Public transit: 2nd and King; 4th and King; San Francisco; Golden Gate Ferry: Larkspur; San Francisco Bay Ferry: Alameda, Oakland, Vallejo

Construction
- Groundbreaking: December 11, 1997
- Opened: March 31, 2000
- Renovated: October 2019 – June 2020
- Cost: US$357 million (US$667 million in 2025 dollars)
- Architect: HOK Sport
- Project manager: Alliance Building Partners
- Structural engineer: Thornton Tomasetti
- Services engineers: M-E Engineers, Inc.
- General contractor: Hunt–Kajima Consortium

Tenants
- San Francisco Giants (MLB) (2000–present); San Francisco Demons (XFL) (2001); Kraft Fight Hunger Bowl (NCAA) (2002–2013); California Redwoods (UFL) (2009); California Golden Bears (NCAA) (2011)

Website
- mlb.com/giants/ballpark

Oracle Park is a ballpark in the South Beach neighborhood of San Francisco, California, United States. Since 2000, it has been the home of the San Francisco Giants of Major League Baseball (MLB). The stadium stands along San Francisco Bay; the section of the bay beyond Oracle Park's right field wall is unofficially known as McCovey Cove, in honor of former Giants player Willie McCovey. Previously named Pacific Bell Park, SBC Park, and AT&T Park, the stadium's existing name was purchased by Oracle Corporation in 2019.

Oracle Park has also hosted professional and college football games. The stadium was the home of the annual college postseason bowl game now known as the Redbox Bowl from its inaugural playing in 2002 until 2013, and also served as the temporary home for the California Golden Bears football team in 2011. Professionally, it was the home of the San Francisco Demons of the XFL and the California Redwoods of the United Football League.

Public transit access to the stadium is provided within San Francisco by Muni Metro or Muni Bus, from the Peninsula and Santa Clara Valley via Caltrain, and from parts of the Bay Area across the water via various ferries of San Francisco Bay. The Muni 2nd and King Station is directly outside the ballpark, the 4th and King Caltrain station is 1.5 blocks from the stadium, and the Oracle Park ferry terminal is outside the eastern edge of the ballpark beyond the center field bleachers.

== History ==
=== Design and construction ===
Originally designed to be a 42,000-seat stadium, there were slight modifications before the final design was complete. When the ballpark was brought to the ballot box in the fall of 1996 for voter approval, the stadium was 15° clockwise from its current position. The center-field scoreboard was atop the right-field wall, with the Giants Pavilion Building being in two separate buildings. Groundbreaking on the ballpark began on December 11, 1997, in the industrial waterfront area of San Francisco known as China Basin in the up-and-coming neighborhoods of South Beach and Mission Bay. The stadium cost $357 million to build and supplanted the Giants' former home, Candlestick Park, a multi-use stadium in southeastern San Francisco that was also home to the NFL's San Francisco 49ers until 2014, when they relocated to Levi's Stadium in Santa Clara. A team of engineers from UC Davis was consulted in the design process of the park, resulting in wind levels that are approximately half those at Candlestick. But due to Oracle Park's location at San Francisco Bay, cold fog and temperatures in summer months are still not unusual at Giants games, despite reduced wind levels.

When it opened on March 31, 2000, the ballpark was the first MLB ballpark built without public funds since the completion of Dodger Stadium in 1962. However, the Giants did receive a $10 million tax abatement from the city and $80 million for upgrades to the local infrastructure (including a connection to the Muni Metro). The Giants have a 66-year lease on the 12.5-acre (51,000 m^{2}) ballpark site, paying $1.2 million in rent annually to the San Francisco Port Commission. The park opened with a seating capacity of 40,800, but this has increased over time as seats have been added. In April 2010, the stadium became the first MLB ballpark to receive LEED Silver Certification for Existing Buildings, Operations and Maintenance.

Following the 2019 season, the organization began the process of relocating the bullpens from the first and third base foul lines to behind the outfield walls in center and right-centerfield. The motivation was two-fold: to address player safety issues that had arisen over the years by having the bullpen mounds in the field of play, and to slightly alter the dimensions of the park to perhaps increase, if ever-so-slightly, the potential for home runs in certain areas of the outfield, most notably in right-center field, affectionately known as Triples Alley (a design feature meant as an homage to the centerfield depth of the Giants former home in New York, The Polo Grounds). Prior to these modifications, multiple players both home and away had experienced various levels of injury sustained by tripping over the bullpen mounds while chasing foul balls. Most notably, former Giants outfield prospect Mac Williamson sustained a concussion during such a play that significantly altered his season.

=== Naming rights ===
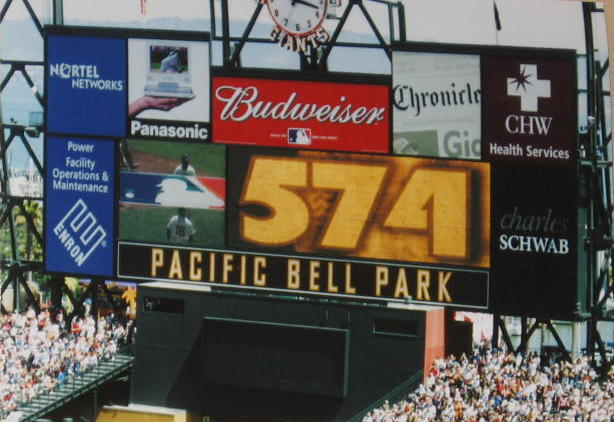
Barry Bonds passes Harmon Killebrew for seventh on the all-time home run list on May 13, 2002.

On April 3, 1996, Pacific Bell, a telephone company serving California based in San Francisco, purchased the naming rights for the planned ballpark for $50 million for 24 years. The stadium was named Pacific Bell Park, or Pac Bell Park for short.

Just days before the sponsorship was announced, SBC Communications had announced their intention to acquire Pacific Bell's parent company, Pacific Telesis, a deal which closed in April 1997. SBC eventually stopped using the Pacific Bell name for marketing, and reached an agreement with the Giants to change the stadium's name to SBC Park on January 1, 2004.

After SBC bought AT&T Corporation on November 18, 2005, the name of the merged company became AT&T Inc. As a result, in 2006 the stadium was given its third name in six years: AT&T Park.

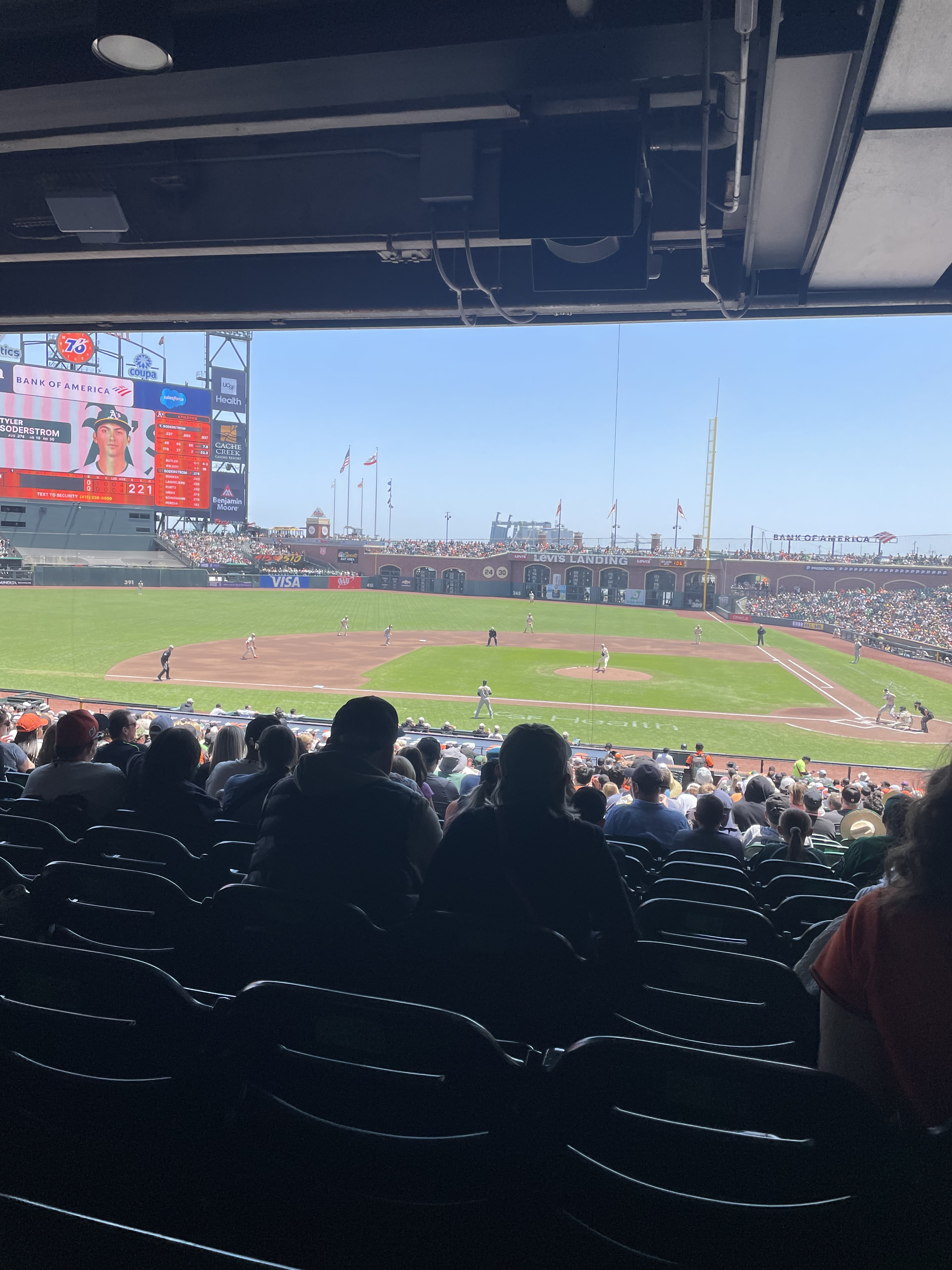
A Giants' day game on May 18, 2025, vs. the Athletics from a lower-level view at Oracle Park

On January 9, 2019, it was reported that AT&T had given the Giants the option of ending the naming deal a year early, if the team could quickly find a new partner. The Giants and Redwood Shores based Oracle Corporation came to a rapid agreement, with the old AT&T Park signs being replaced with temporary Oracle Park banners on January 10.

=== 2020 renovations ===
The Giants renovated the center field section of Oracle Park between October 2019 and June 2020. The bullpens were moved from foul territory into center field, so the Giants decided to make their garden smaller to fit the bullpens behind the center-field wall. With this renovation, the dimensions of the park have slightly shrunk. Left-center was trimmed down from 404 feet to 399 feet, right-center (known as Triples Alley) was trimmed down from 421 feet to 415 feet (to represent the San Francisco area code), and dead-center was trimmed down from 399 feet to 391 feet, making it the second shortest dead-center field distance in MLB, behind Fenway Park in Boston. With this renovation, approximately 650 bleacher seats had to be removed, so the two terraces could be built for fans to watch the relief pitchers warm-up from up close. The center field wall shortened from eight feet to seven feet, but after the Giants first exhibition of the 2020 season, the dead-center field part of the wall (covering the garden) was raised from seven feet to ten feet to improve visibility to the hitter.

Despite having the distinction of being the least home-run friendly field in the Major Leagues over several seasons prior to the renovations, it is believed that these renovations were made to increase home run output from the Giants. MLB has seen a surge in home run production in recent years, and the Giants consistently ranked well towards the bottom in this category in large part because of Oracle Park's extreme advantage to pitchers. This hurt the run production of Giants players and also discouraged power hitters from wanting to play for the Giants. From 2017 to 2019, one of the common criticisms of the Giants was their lack of offensive output and unwillingness to adjust to a home run-heavy offense. However, the Giants significantly improved in 2020, the first year the dimensions were moved in. Things would trend upward with a massive bounce-back season in 2021; several Giants such as Brandon Belt and Mike Yastrzemski fueled the offense with more home runs, especially to a shortened triple's alley (which was infamous for turning what would be a long HR in several ballparks into deep 420-foot+ flyouts, killing several promising San Francisco scoring opportunities in the past). Oracle Park still ranks towards the bottom of the home run category, but this designation is not as consistent anymore.

During the 2023–24 offseason, the Giants installed new programmable LED lighting technology providing full color spectrum capabilities and motion lighting effects for Giants home runs, wins and other special occasions. Oracle Park became the first MLB ballpark to have spotlights, in the form of 12 advanced moving light features. Speaker upgrades were also done with the addition of subwoofers, allowing a more immersive audio experience.

== Features ==
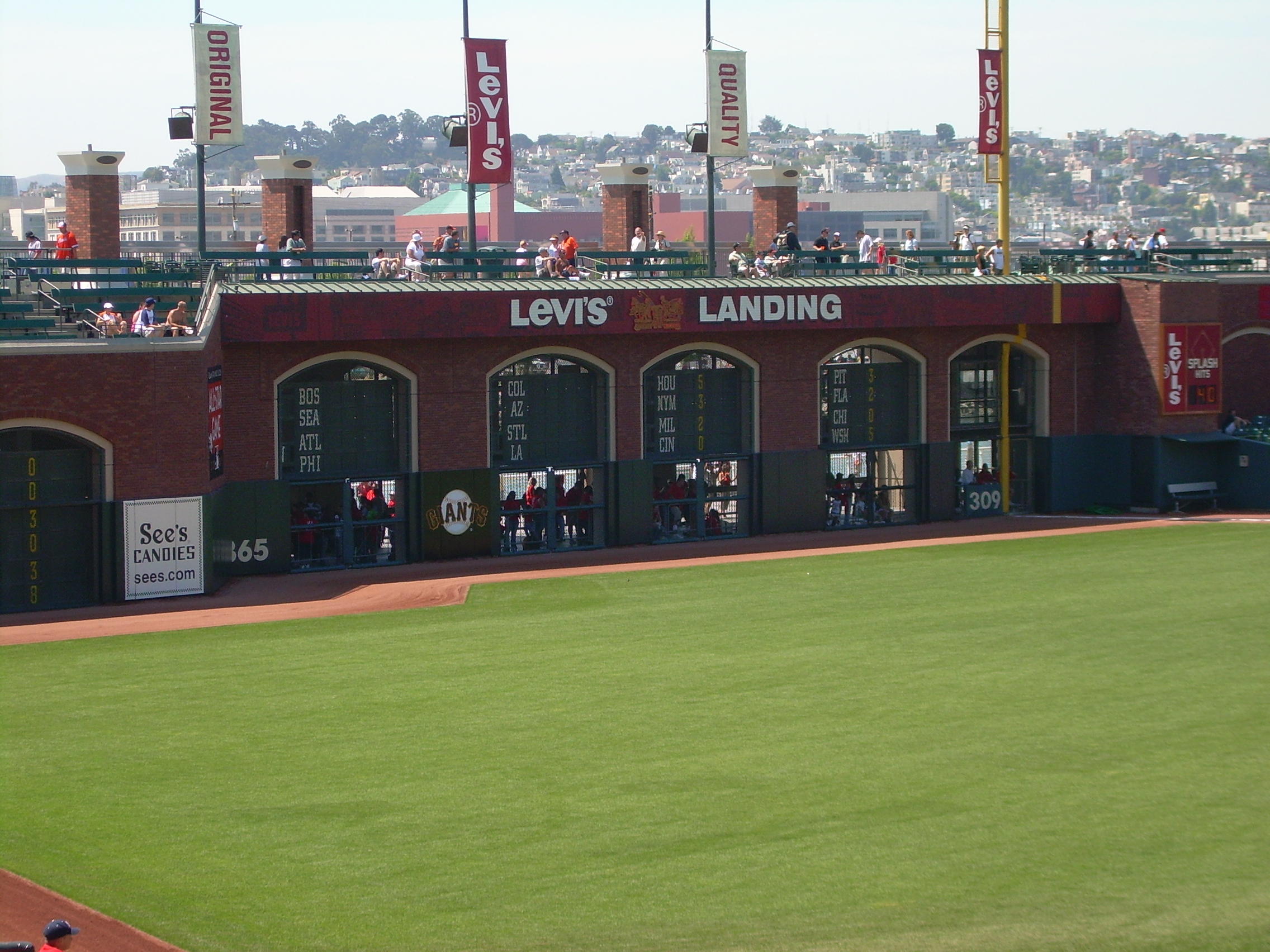
The 24-foot (7.3 m) high wall in right field

The stadium contains 68 luxury suites, 5,200 club seats on the club level, and an additional 1,500 club seats at the field level behind home plate.

On the facing of the upper deck along the left-field line are the retired numbers of Bill Terry, Mel Ott, Carl Hubbell, Monte Irvin, Will Clark, Willie Mays, Barry Bonds, Juan Marichal, Orlando Cepeda, Jackie Robinson, Willie McCovey, and Gaylord Perry, as well as the retired uniforms, denoted "NY", of Christy Mathewson and John McGraw who played or managed in the pre-number era. These two pre-number–era retired uniforms are among only six such retired uniforms in all of the Major Leagues.

Oracle Park has a reputation of being a pitcher's park and the most pitcher-friendly ballpark in the National League. According to MLB's Statcast data, Oracle Park is slightly hitter friendly for singles and doubles and a very strong park for triples, but strongly suppresses home runs. In 2025, Oracle Park was 15th of 30 MLB stadiums in overall Park Factor at an almost-neutral 99, but ranked 25th of 30 in home runs.

=== Right field and McCovey Cove ===
The prominent feature of the ballpark is the right-field wall, which is 24 feet (7.3 m) high, which honors former Giants player Willie Mays. Because of the proximity to the San Francisco Bay, the right-field foul pole is only 309 feet (94.2 m) from home plate, the shortest in the NL [only AL Fenway Park's is shorter, at 302 feet (92.0 m)]. The wall is made of brick, with fenced-off archways opening to the Cove beyond, above which are several rows of arcade seating. The fence angles quickly away from home plate; right-center field extended out to 421 feet (128.3 m) from home plate (changed with the 2020 renovations to 415 feet). Atop the fence are four fountain pillars. Jets of water burst from the four pillars at the end of the National Anthem, as well as when the Giants hit a home run or win a game.

The right field area was designed to resemble the Polo Grounds. This deep corner of the ballpark has been dubbed "Death Valley" and "Triples Alley". Like its Polo Grounds counterpart, it is very difficult to hit a home run to this area, and a batted ball that finds its way into this corner often results in a triple. It is 415 feet (126.49 m). Triples Alley is also infamous for bad bounces, most notably when Ichiro Suzuki hit the first-ever inside-the-park home run in an All-Star Game in 2007, by lining the ball off one of the archways and sideways past the outfielders. Nate Schierholtz performed the same feat in the 2009 season as a pinch hitter. Aubrey Huff did it again in the 2010 season, as did Conor Gillaspie in 2011. Ángel Pagán ended a game in May 2013 with a two-run walk-off (extra-inning, come-from-behind) inside-the-park home run, the first of its kind at the then-named AT&T Park.

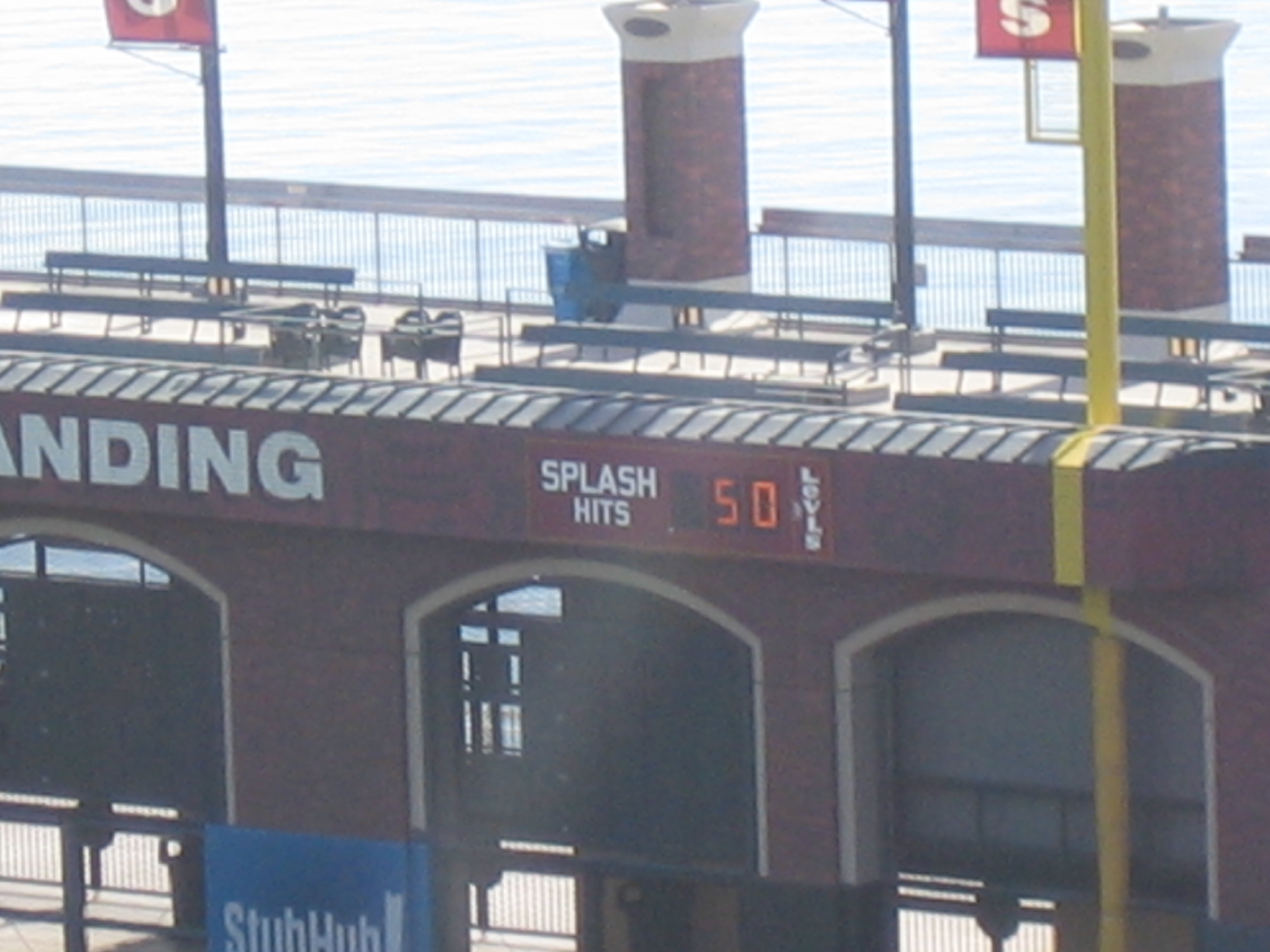
The "Splash Hit" counter

Beyond right field is China Basin, a section of San Francisco Bay, which is dubbed McCovey Cove after famed Giants first baseman and left-handed slugger Willie McCovey, and into which a number of home runs have been hit on the fly. As of August 16, 2026, 110 "splash hits" have been knocked into the Cove by Giants players since the park opened; 35 of those were hit by Barry Bonds, who remains the only player to record two splash hits in the same game. On September 15, 2024, Heliot Ramos became the first right-handed batter to record a "splash hit", as all 104 previous hits were done by left-handed batters. These hits are tallied on an electronic counter on the right field wall. Opponents have hit the water on the fly 57 times; Todd Hundley of the Los Angeles Dodgers was the first visitor to do so on June 30, 2000. Curtis Granderson, Luis Gonzalez, Cliff Floyd, and Max Muncy are the only visiting players to do so twice. Carlos Delgado and Adam LaRoche have performed the feat thrice. Ronny Mauricio is the most recent visiting player to record a splash hit, doing so in July of 2025. On June 27, 2010, David Ortiz became the first American League player to hit a splash hit. Since then, the only other AL players who have are Mitch Moreland, Adam Dunn, Rougned Odor, and Shin-Soo Choo.

Behind the scoreboard in center field is a pier where ferries let fans off at the park. On game days, fans take to the water of McCovey Cove in boats often with fishing nets in the hope of collecting a home run ball. Just beyond the wall, behind the King Street ballpark, is a public waterfront promenade. Across the cove from the ballpark are McCovey Point and China Basin Park, featuring monuments to past Giants legends.

List of Home Team Splash Hits

#	Player	Date	Opponent	Pitcher
1	Barry Bonds	May 1, 2000	New York Mets	Rich Rodriguez
2	Barry Bonds	May 10, 2000	St. Louis Cardinals	Andy Benes
3	Barry Bonds	May 10, 2000	St. Louis Cardinals	Heathcliff Slocumb
4	Barry Bonds	May 24, 2000	Montreal Expos	Mike Thurman
5	Barry Bonds	July 19, 2000	San Diego Padres	Brian Meadows
6	Barry Bonds	September 20, 2000	Cincinnati Reds	Steve Parris
7	Barry Bonds	April 17, 2001	Los Angeles Dodgers	Terry Adams
8	Barry Bonds	April 18, 2001	Los Angeles Dodgers	Chan Ho Park
9	Barry Bonds	May 24, 2001	Colorado Rockies	John Thomson
10	Felipe Crespo	May 28, 2001	Arizona Diamondbacks	Bret Prinz
11	Barry Bonds	May 30, 2001	Arizona Diamondbacks	Robert Ellis
12	Barry Bonds	June 12, 2001	Anaheim Angels	Pat Rapp
13	Felipe Crespo	July 8, 2001	Milwaukee Brewers	Curtis Leskanic
14	Barry Bonds	August 4, 2001	Philadelphia Phillies	Nelson Figueroa
15	Barry Bonds	August 14, 2001	Florida Marlins	Ricky Bones
16	Barry Bonds	August 31, 2001	Colorado Rockies	John Thomson
17	Barry Bonds	September 29, 2001	San Diego Padres	Chuck McElroy
18	Barry Bonds	May 13, 2002	Atlanta Braves	Kevin Millwood
19	Barry Bonds	May 18, 2002	Florida Marlins	Brad Penny
20	Barry Bonds	May 18, 2002	Florida Marlins	Vic Darensbourg
21	Barry Bonds	September 8, 2002	Arizona Diamondbacks	Brian Anderson
22	Barry Bonds	September 28, 2002	Houston Astros	Jeriome Robertson
23	Barry Bonds	October 12, 2002	St. Louis Cardinals	Chuck Finley
24	Barry Bonds	April 14, 2003	Houston Astros	Wade Miller
25	Barry Bonds	April 30, 2003	Chicago Cubs	Matt Clement
26	J. T. Snow	June 5, 2003	Minnesota Twins	Kyle Lohse
27	Barry Bonds	June 27, 2003	Oakland Athletics	Ted Lilly
28	Jose Cruz Jr.	July 8, 2003	St. Louis Cardinals	Dan Haren
29	Barry Bonds	August 8, 2003	Philadelphia Phillies	Jose Mesa
30	Barry Bonds	August 19, 2003	Atlanta Braves	Ray King
31	Barry Bonds	September 13, 2003	Milwaukee Brewers	Doug Davis
32	Barry Bonds	April 12, 2004	Milwaukee Brewers	Matt Kinney
33	Barry Bonds	April 13, 2004	Milwaukee Brewers	Ben Ford
34	Michael Tucker	May 30, 2004	Colorado Rockies	Joe Kennedy
35	A. J. Pierzynski	July 6, 2004	Colorado Rockies	Denny Stark
36	Barry Bonds	July 30, 2004	St. Louis Cardinals	Chris Carpenter
37	Barry Bonds	August 3, 2004	Cincinnati Reds	Cory Lidle
38	Michael Tucker	April 9, 2005	Colorado Rockies	Scott Dohmann
39	Randy Winn	September 14, 2005	San Diego Padres	Woody Williams
40	Barry Bonds	September 18, 2005	Los Angeles Dodgers	Hong-Chih Kuo
41	Barry Bonds	August 21, 2006	Arizona Diamondbacks	Livan Hernandez
42	Barry Bonds	April 18, 2007	St. Louis Cardinals	Ryan Franklin
43	Ryan Klesko	May 21, 2007	Houston Astros	Trever Miller
44	Ryan Klesko	June 29, 2007	Arizona Diamondbacks	Livan Hernandez
45	Barry Bonds	August 8, 2007	Washington Nationals	Tim Redding
46	Fred Lewis	April 26, 2008	Cincinnati Reds	Matt Belisle
47	John Bowker	July 2, 2008	Chicago Cubs	Ryan Dempster
48	Andres Torres	June 15, 2009	Los Angeles Angels of Anaheim	John Lackey
49	Pablo Sandoval	July 30, 2009	Philadelphia Phillies	Rodrigo Lopez
50	Pablo Sandoval	August 29, 2009	Colorado Rockies	Jason Marquis
51	Aubrey Huff	May 1, 2010	Colorado Rockies	Rafael Betancourt
52	Aubrey Huff	June 16, 2010	Baltimore Orioles	Jeremy Guthrie
53	Andres Torres	July 28, 2010	Florida Marlins	Jorge Sosa
54	Pablo Sandoval	August 12, 2010	Chicago Cubs	Randy Wells
55	Pablo Sandoval	September 30, 2010	Arizona Diamondbacks	Barry Enright
56	Pablo Sandoval	July 4, 2011	San Diego Padres	Ernesto Frieri
57	Nate Schierholtz	July 8, 2011	New York Mets	R. A. Dickey
58	Pablo Sandoval	August 31, 2011	Chicago Cubs	Rodrigo Lopez
59	Carlos Beltran	September 14, 2011	San Diego Padres	Mat Latos
60	Brandon Belt	September 27, 2011	Colorado Rockies	Alex White
61	Brandon Belt	June 14, 2012	Houston Astros	Wandy Rodriguez
62	Brandon Belt	September 4, 2012	Arizona Diamondbacks	Ian Kennedy
63	Pablo Sandoval	May 12, 2013	Atlanta Braves	Kris Medlen
64	Brandon Crawford	April 13, 2014	Colorado Rockies	Rex Brothers
65	Tyler Colvin	May 12, 2014	Atlanta Braves	Gavin Floyd
66	Brandon Crawford	May 14, 2014	Atlanta Braves	David Carpenter
67	Travis Ishikawa	September 12, 2014	Los Angeles Dodgers	Kevin Correia
68	Brandon Belt	September 25, 2014	San Diego Padres	Andrew Cashner
69	Brandon Belt	June 8, 2016	Boston Red Sox	David Price
70	Denard Span	June 13, 2016	Milwaukee Brewers	Chase Anderson
71	Denard Span	August 20, 2016	New York Mets	Bartolo Colón
72	Brandon Belt	May 13, 2017	Cincinnati Reds	Lisalverto Bonilla
73	Brandon Belt	June 10, 2017	Minnesota Twins	Jose Berrios
74	Denard Span	July 7, 2017	Miami Marlins	Dan Straily
75	Denard Span	July 19, 2017	Cleveland Indians	Carlos Carrasco
76	Denard Span	September 11, 2017	Los Angeles Dodgers	Kenta Maeda
77	Pablo Sandoval	April 4, 2018	Seattle Mariners	Félix Hernández
78	Brandon Belt	May 15, 2018	Cincinnati Reds	Tyler Mahle
79	Stephen Vogt	August 9, 2019	Philadelphia Phillies	Drew Smyly
80	Scooter Gennett	August 11, 2019	Philadelphia Phillies	Ranger Suárez
81	Brandon Belt	August 29, 2019	San Diego Padres	Chris Paddack
82	Mike Yastrzemski	July 29, 2020	San Diego Padres	Matt Strahm
83	Mike Yastrzemski	September 25, 2020	San Diego Padres	Chris Paddack
84	Mike Yastrzemski	April 24, 2021	Miami Marlins	Yimi García
85	Brandon Crawford	April 27, 2021	Colorado Rockies	Daniel Bard
86	Steven Duggar	June 15, 2021	Arizona Diamondbacks	Alex Young
87	Mike Yastrzemski	June 15, 2021	Arizona Diamondbacks	Humberto Castellanos
88	Brandon Belt	June 19, 2021	Philadelphia Phillies	Aaron Nola
89	LaMonte Wade Jr.	July 31, 2021	Houston Astros	Zack Greinke
90	Alex Dickerson	August 11, 2021	Arizona Diamondbacks	Tyler Clippard
91	LaMonte Wade Jr.	September 17, 2021	Atlanta Braves	Ian Anderson
92	Jason Vosler	April 30, 2022	Washington Nationals	Erasmo Ramírez
93	Mike Yastrzemski	May 8, 2022	St. Louis Cardinals	Génesis Cabrera
94	Joc Pederson	May 24, 2022	New York Mets	Drew Smith
95	LaMonte Wade Jr.	July 17, 2022	Milwaukee Brewers	Jason Alexander
96	Joc Pederson	August 30, 2022	San Diego Padres	Nick Martinez
97	Joc Pederson	September 2, 2022	Philadelphia Phillies	Kyle Gibson
98	LaMonte Wade Jr.	April 8, 2023	Kansas City Royals	Brady Singer
99	Brandon Crawford	April 22, 2023	New York Mets	David Peterson
100	Lamonte Wade Jr.	June 2, 2023	Baltimore Orioles	Dean Kremer
101	Joc Pederson	June 11, 2023	Chicago Cubs	Hayden Wesneski
102	Mike Yastrzemski	June 19, 2023	San Diego Padres	Ray Kerr
103	Patrick Bailey	April 20, 2024	Arizona Diamondbacks	Zac Gallen
104	LaMonte Wade Jr.	September 4, 2024	Arizona Diamondbacks	Kevin Ginkel
105	Heliot Ramos	September 15, 2024	San Diego Padres	Robert Suarez
106	Mike Yastrzemski	April 9, 2025	Cincinnati Reds	Emilio Pagán
107	Dominic Smith	August 29, 2025	Baltimore Orioles	Corbin Martin
108	Rafael Devers	September 24, 2025	St. Louis Cardinals	Sonny Gray
109	Bryce Eldridge	July 9, 2026	Colorado Rockies	Ryan Feltner

=== Rusty, the Coke bottle, and the glove ===
When the park opened in 2000, taking residence on the right field wall was Rusty the Mechanical Man, a two-dimensional, robotic baseball player that stood 14 feet (4.3 m) tall and weighed 5 1/2 tons. The Santa Clarita-based firm Technifex engineered, fabricated and programmed Rusty to appear after major plays during games as a fully animated giant 1920s-era tin toy. After technical problems arose with Rusty, it was removed from the wall, though the enclosure that housed him remained for years. In 2008, the enclosure was removed to make way for luxury boxes.

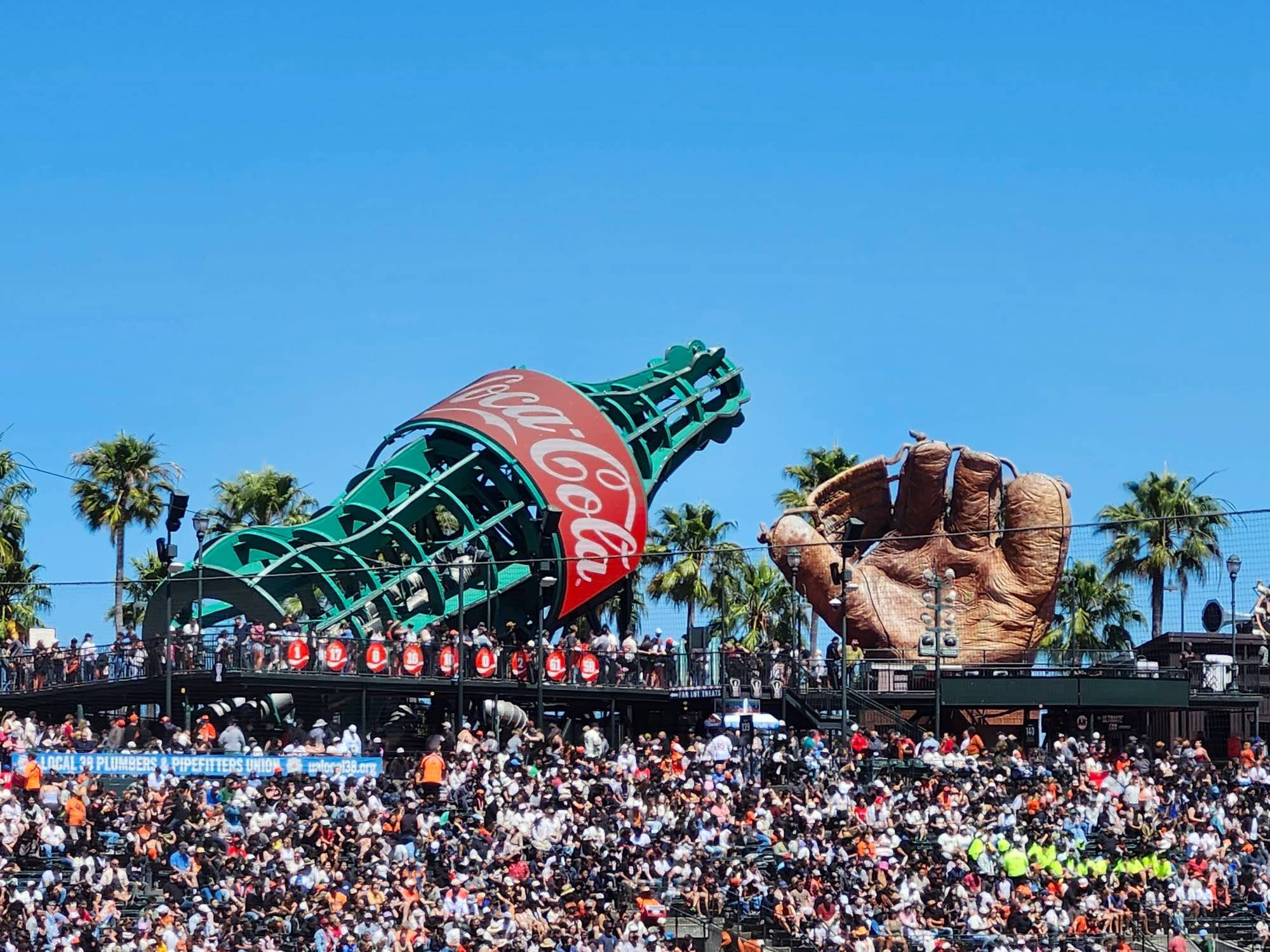
Coca Cola and Glove at Oracle Park

Behind the left field bleachers is "The Coca-Cola Fan Lot". The ballpark features an 80-foot (24 m) long Coca-Cola bottle with playground slides that light up with every Giants home run, and a miniature version of the stadium. Bubbles originally accompanied the bottle, but never worked as intended and were removed. Directly to the bottle's right from home plate is another oversized representation of a ballpark stalwart, the "Giant 1927 Old-Time Four-Fingered Baseball Glove"—this particular one is made of steel and fiberglass, which is behind the 501 ft (152.7 m) sign. Behind and farther to the left is "The Little Giants Park", a miniature baseball diamond.

To the right of the glove sculpture is a large plaza area for functions and parties to be held during games. It is also the site of "Orlando's", the concessions stand of Giants great Orlando Cepeda. Right-center field features a retired San Francisco cable car numbered 44 (retired cable car #4, formerly #504) in honor of Giants great Willie McCovey. Originally, the cable car had a label that stated "No Dodgers Fans Allowed", as well as one end of the car numbered 24 in honor of Willie Mays and the other end numbered 44 in honor of Willie McCovey. The foghorn—a feature introduced at Candlestick Park by the current Giants ownership group – was transferred to Oracle and hung underneath the scoreboard. It blows when a Giants player hits a home run or at the conclusion of a Giants win.

=== @Café ===
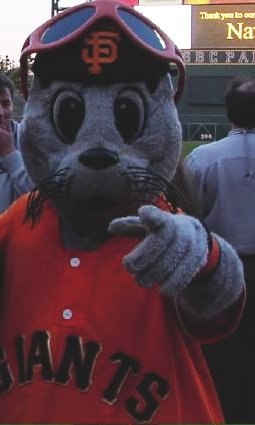
Lou Seal has served as mascot of the San Francisco Giants since 1996.

Located behind the centerfield bleachers, the ballpark features the @Café, a social media café, which opened in the 2013 season. The cafe serves Peet's Coffee and features large screens that show off fans' social media posts from Facebook, Twitter, and Instagram, which are curated by the Giants organization.

The cafe replaced a team-themed Build-A-Bear Workshop store, where fans could build their own stuffed Giants' mascot, Lou Seal, or create other Giants-themed stuffed animals.

=== Scoreboards ===
In addition to the automated scoreboards, which now include a new HD videoboard by Mitsubishi, the park has a manually operated scoreboard on the right field wall, which displays all the scores of Major League Baseball games being played elsewhere. The manual scoreboards are operated by three employees, whose work on game days starts at least two hours before the first pitch. A members-only bar, Gotham Club, is located behind the manual scoreboard, complete with a bowling alley and pool tables. Former players and VIPs are the only patrons of this exclusive area. Four other ballparks also use hand-operated out-of-town scoreboards: Coors Field, Fenway Park, Daikin Park, and Wrigley Field.

=== Wireless internet ===
Starting in 2004, the Giants installed 122 wireless internet access points, covering all concourses and seating areas, creating one of the largest public hotspots in the world at the time.

=== San Francisco Giants Wall of Fame ===
On September 23, 2008, the Giants Wall of Fame was unveiled on the King Street side of the ballpark, as part of the 50th-anniversary celebration of the Giants' move to San Francisco. 48 retired players were inducted, based on longevity and achievement. Eligibility requirements for players to be on the Wall are either a minimum of three seasons with three MLB All-Star selections in every season, five years as a San Francisco Giant with an MLB All-Star Game selection, nine seasons played with the team, or any player with three World Series rings as a Giant. Rich Aurilia and Shawn Estes were added in 2010. Jason Schmidt and Marvin Benard were added in 2011, and Barry Bonds was added in 2017.

Giants Home Attendance at Oracle Park
Season	Attendance	Avg./Game	Rank
2000	3,318,800	40,973	2nd
2001	3,311,958	40,888	1st
2002	3,253,203	40,163	1st
2003	3,264,898	40,307	1st
2004	3,256,854	39,718	3rd
2005	3,181,023	39,272	3rd
2006	3,130,313	38,646	4th
2007	3,223,215	39,793	5th
2008	2,863,837	35,356	7th
2009	2,862,110	35,335	7th
2010	3,037,443	37,499	5th
2011	3,387,303	41,819	2nd
2012	3,377,371	41,696	2nd
2013	3,369,106	41,593	3rd
2014	3,368,697	41,589	3rd
2015	3,375,882	41,678	3rd
2016	3,365,256	41,546	3rd
2017	3,303,652	40,785	3rd
2018	3,156,185	38,965	3rd
2019	2,707,760	33,429	7th
2020	0	0	—
2021	1,679,484	20,734	8th
2022	2,482,686	30,650	8th
2023	2,500,153	30,866	10th
2024	2,647,736	32,688	7th
2025	2,925,823	36,121	6th	Source:

=== Statues ===
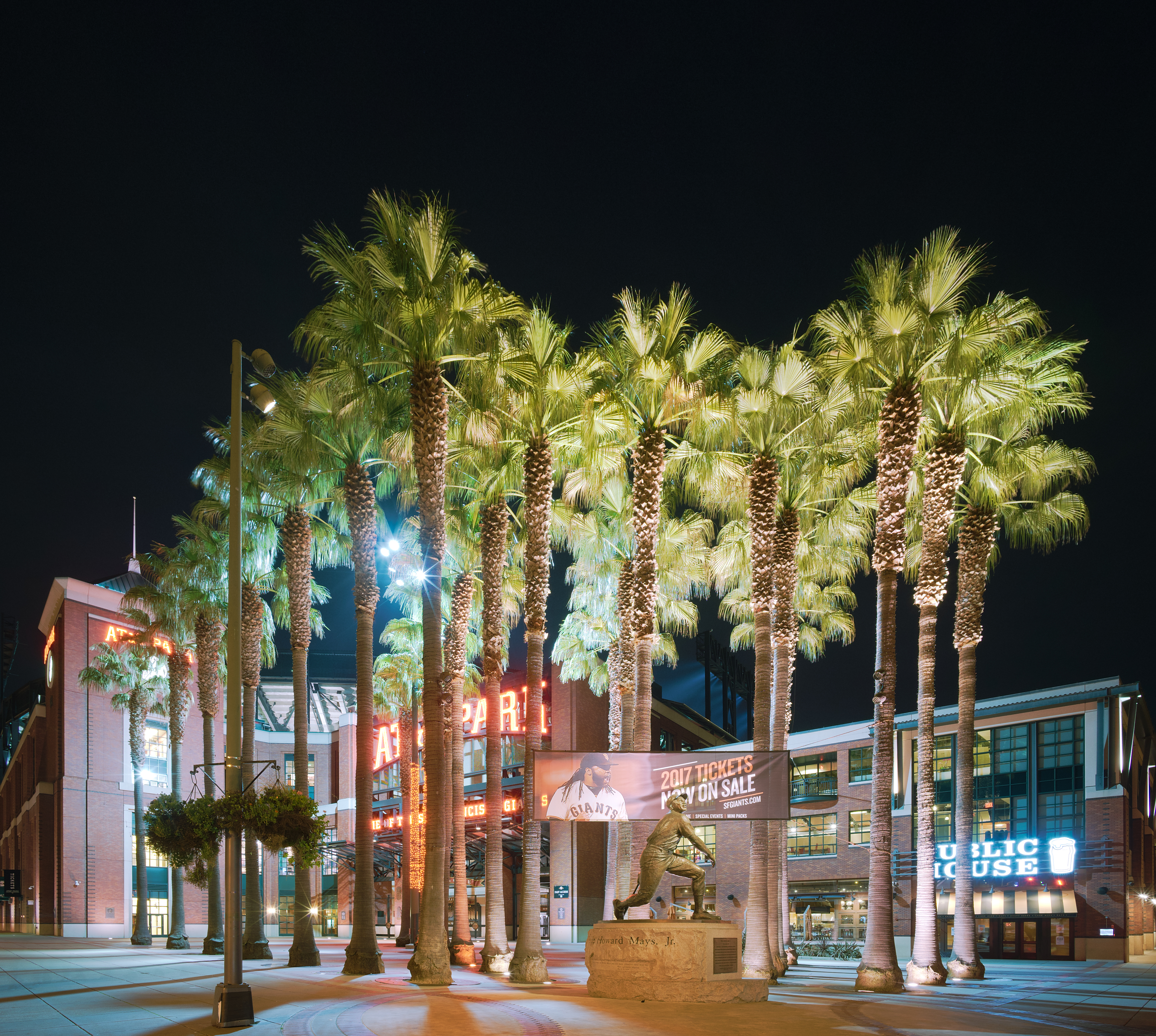
Main entrance with Willie Mays statue and 24 palm trees

Outside the ballpark are six statues, five of which are dedicated to San Francisco Giants all-time greats.

The Willie Mays statue is located in front of the ballpark entrance at 24 Willie Mays Plaza and is surrounded with 24 palm trees, in honor of his number 24 uniform, retired by the Giants. It was dedicated at noon on March 31, 2000, prior to the opening of the ballpark and was commissioned by Giants Managing Partner Peter Magowan.

Another statue was dedicated to Willie McCovey in 2003, and is located at McCovey Point across McCovey Cove. Around the statue are a number of plaques that celebrate the winners of the Willie Mac Award. The statue is located at China Basin Park next to the Barry Bonds Junior Giants Field, a T-ball park. Also located on the sea wall promenade are plaques showing the Opening Day roster of every Giants team from 1958 through 1999. Giants fans who contributed funds to China Basin Park had their own tiles with their own inscriptions set into the wall.

A third statue, dedicated in 2005, honors former Giants pitcher Juan Marichal, and is located outside the ballpark at the Lefty O'Doul Gate entrance.

The fourth and only non-human statue is located at the park's ferry plaza behind center field, also known as Seals Plaza. A statue of a seal bobbing a baseball on its nose honors the memory of the San Francisco Seals, the minor league baseball club that played before the arrival of the Giants in 1958.

On September 6, 2008, during a series against the Pittsburgh Pirates, a fifth statue depicting Giants great Orlando Cepeda was dedicated at the corner of 2nd Street and King Street, next to the ballpark. A sixth statue, dedicated on August 13, 2016, honors former Giants pitcher Gaylord Perry in the same location. All five player statues were created by sculptor William Behrends of North Carolina.

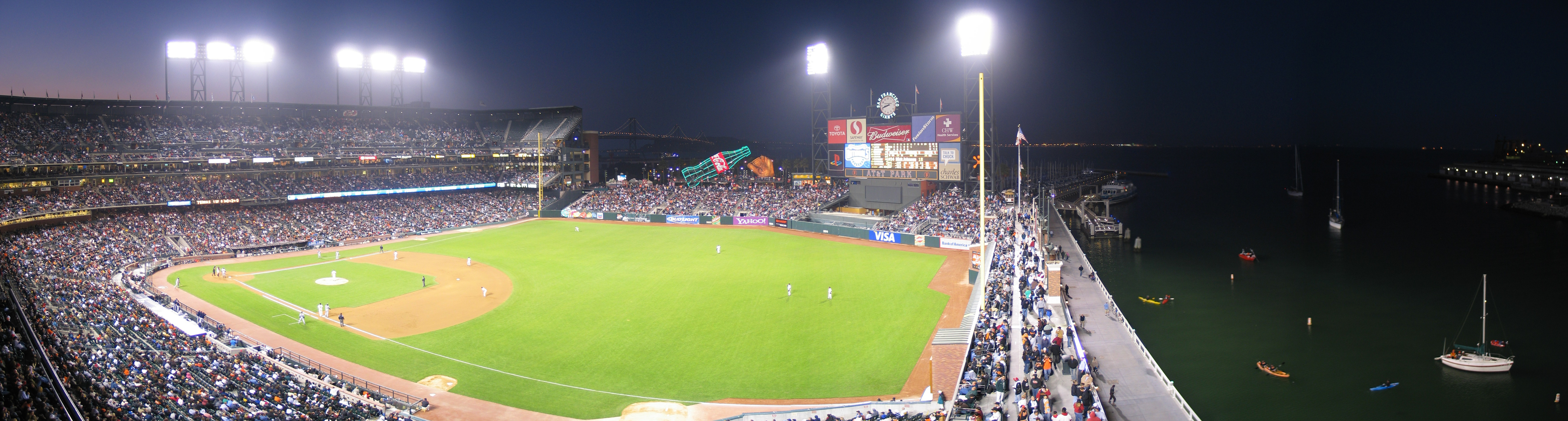
Oracle Park, with the Bay Bridge in the background and McCovey Cove on the right

=== Left field Chevron banner and ground rule issues ===
One feature of the ballpark is the long-running Chevron advertisement located in left field, featuring an outline of the company's claymation Chevron Cars. The top 'roofs' of the cars (along with a dog and a surfboard hanging out a car window) are extended out, rendering it several inches higher than the wall base, creating a ground rules issue. Several instances where potential over-the-wall catches to take away home runs were thwarted have occurred because of the advertisement's top dimensions. One notable example of this occurred during Game 3 of the 2016 NLDS against the Chicago Cubs. Kris Bryant hit a ball well into left field, with Giants left fielder Gregor Blanco attempting a catch. The ball landed on the roof of one of the cars, past the wall, and out of his reach, rendering it a home run and tying the game in the top of the ninth inning (though the Giants would win the game in extra innings for their only win in the series).

=== Climate ===
Oracle Park

Climate chart (precipitation, max. and min. temperature)
J	F	M	A	M	J	J	A	S	O	N	D
111 14 8	102 16 9	85 17 10	36 17 10	12 18 11	4 19 12	1 19 12	5 20 13	29 21 13	35 21 13	76 18 11	105 14 8
- █ Average max. and min. temperatures in °C
- █ Precipitation totals in mm
Imperial conversion
J	F	M	A	M	J	J	A	S	O	N	D
4.4 57 46	4 61 48	3.3 63 50	1.4 63 50	0.5 64 52	0.2 66 54	0 66 54	0.2 68 55	1.1 70 55	1.4 70 55	3 64 52	4.1 57 46
- █ Average max. and min. temperatures in °F
- █ Precipitation totals in inches

== Notable events ==
=== 2000s ===
The opening series took place April 11–13, 2000, against the Los Angeles Dodgers (the team the Giants faced in their final series at Candlestick Park), and the Giants were swept in three games. In the first game of that series, the Giants lost 6–5, highlighted by three home runs from the Dodgers' Kevin Elster. On May 1, 2000, Barry Bonds became the first player to hit a "splash hit" home run into McCovey Cove.

In just its first few years of existence, the ballpark saw its share of historic events primarily due to veteran Giants outfielder Barry Bonds. On April 17, 2001, Bonds hit his 500th career home run at then-Pacific Bell Park. Later that year, he set the single season home run record when he hit home runs number 71, 72, and 73 over the weekend of October 5 to close the season. On August 9, 2002, Bonds hit his 600th career home run at the park. On April 12, 2004, Bonds hit career home run 660 at SBC Park to tie Willie Mays for third on the all-time list and on the next night, he hit number 661 to move into sole possession of third place. On September 17, 2004, Bonds hit his 700th career home run at the park to become just the third member of baseball's 700 club. On May 28, 2006, Bonds hit his 715th home run at the park to pass Babe Ruth for second place on the all-time list. On August 7, 2007, Bonds hit his 756th home run, breaking Hank Aaron's record.

The park hosted games three through five of the 2002 World Series against the Anaheim Angels, which the Giants lost four games to three. It also hosted the 2007 MLB All-Star Game, which the American League won 5–4 over the National League.

On July 10, 2009, the Giants' Jonathan Sánchez pitched the first no-hitter.

=== 2010s ===
"This place has enriched our lives with friendships, experiences and memories beyond what words can express."

— Bruce Bochy remarks made towards the end of his farewell speech after his final game as San Francisco Giants manager on September 29, 2019

On October 27 and 28, 2010, the Giants hosted the first two games of the World Series, beating the Texas Rangers in both games. They ultimately went on to win the series four games to one, their first championship since the team moved to San Francisco in 1958, though the clinching game was played at Rangers Ballpark in Arlington rather than at Oracle Park.

On June 13, 2012, Matt Cain threw the 22nd perfect game in MLB history—and first in Giants history—against the Houston Astros.

Oracle Park hosted Games 1 and 2 of the 2012 World Series on October 24 and 25. The Giants beat the Detroit Tigers twice, 8–3 and 2–0 respectively. The Giants would go on to win the 2012 World Series in a four-game sweep at Comerica Park.

The stadium hosted the semifinal and final rounds of the 2013 World Baseball Classic on March 17–19.

On July 23, 2013, due to a previous rain-out in Cincinnati, Oracle Park served as the "home" venue of the Cincinnati Reds for the second game of a doubleheader against the Giants. Giants manager Bruce Bochy won his 1,500th career game.

On June 25, 2014, Tim Lincecum pitched the 3rd no-hitter at Oracle Park against the San Diego Padres in a 4–0 win. It was his 2nd no-hitter of his career, with both of them coming against the Padres.

Oracle Park hosted Games 3, 4, and 5 of the 2014 World Series on October 24, 25 and 26. The Giants beat the Kansas City Royals 2 out of the 3 games played at Oracle Park, losing Game 3, 3–2, before winning Games 4 and 5, 11–4 and 5–0 respectively. They ultimately went on to win the series in seven games, with the clinching game played at Kauffman Stadium rather than at Oracle Park. As of 2019, the Giants have not hosted a World Series clincher at Oracle Park, but they did host two at Candlestick Park: the first being in 1962, which was won by the New York Yankees, and the second in 1989, which the Oakland Athletics won in a four-game sweep.

On June 15, 2015, the Giants set a record for most consecutive home losses at Oracle Park at nine straight games with a 5–1 loss to the Seattle Mariners. This losing streak was the Giants' longest since an 11-game home loss streak at the Polo Grounds in New York in 1940.

From October 1, 2010, to July 18, 2017, Oracle Park recorded 530 consecutive sellouts, the second longest in Major League history behind Fenway Park's 794 consecutive sellouts from 2003 to 2013.

=== 2020s ===
Oracle Park will host the 2028 Major League Baseball All-Star Game, its first time hosting since 2007.

== Non-baseball events ==
Giants Enterprises, a wholly owned subsidiary of the San Francisco Giants created and headed by longtime team executive Pat Gallagher, brings non-baseball events to Oracle Park on days when the Giants do not play. Prominent among these has been the usage of the stadium for football. It has also hosted a range of other sporting and musical events.

=== Football ===
The park was home to the XFL's San Francisco Demons in 2001, the East–West Shrine Game (until 2006), and the California Redwoods of the UFL in 2009.

From 2002 to 2013, it was also home to college football's Redbox Bowl when the game was known as the San Francisco Bowl, Emerald Bowl, and Fight Hunger Bowl. In 2011, Oracle Park became the temporary home football stadium for the California Golden Bears while Cal's on-campus stadium, California Memorial Stadium, underwent renovation.

Oracle Park also hosted its first high school football game in 2011, the Central Coast Section Division III football championship game between long-time San Francisco rivals St. Ignatius College Preparatory and Sacred Heart Cathedral Preparatory.

In January 2019, it was reported that the Oakland Raiders had considered temporarily moving to Oracle Park for the 2019 NFL season, as an interim measure before construction of the Allegiant Stadium in their new home city of Las Vegas was complete for 2020. However, the 49ers refused to waive their territorial rights, and the Raiders would ultimately reach an agreement with the Oakland-Alameda County Coliseum Authority to return to the Oakland Coliseum for the 2019 season with a provision for the 2020 season should construction of the stadium be delayed.

=== Soccer ===
On February 10, 2006, the U.S. men's soccer team defeated Japan 3–2 at Oracle in a friendly.

A match of the 2011 World Football Challenge between Manchester City and Club America was held at Oracle, drawing a crowd of 11,250.

On March 17, 2012, the Houston Dynamo defeated the San Jose Earthquakes 1–0 in a regular season Major League Soccer match at Oracle.

On July 31, 2013, Everton defeated Juventus 6–5 on penalties after ending regulation tied 1–1 as part of the 2013 International Champions Cup.

On August 23, 2025, Bay FC of the National Women's Soccer League played a game at Oracle Park against the Washington Spirit, the first professional women's sporting event at the stadium, losing 2–3 in front of 40,091 fans, an NWSL attendance record.

Date	Winning Team	Result	Losing Team	Tournament	Spectators
February 10, 2006	United States	3–2	Japan	International Friendly	37,365
July 16, 2011	(England) Manchester City	2–0	(Mexico) Club América	2011 World Football Challenge	11,250
March 17, 2012	(United States) Houston Dynamo	1–0	(United States) San Jose Earthquakes	Major League Soccer	21,816
July 31, 2013	(England) Everton	1–1 (6–5 pen.)	(Italy) Juventus	2013 International Champions Cup	22,208
July 26, 2022	(Spain) Real Madrid	2–2	(Mexico) Club América	Club Friendly	40,630
August 5, 2023	(Spain) Atlético Madrid	1–1	(Spain) Sevilla	Club Friendly	12,000
August 5, 2023	(Spain) Real Sociedad	0–1	(Spain) Real Betis	Club Friendly	12,000
August 23, 2025	(United States) Bay FC	2–3	(United States) Washington Spirit	National Women's Soccer League	40,091

=== Rugby ===
The stadium hosted the 2018 Rugby World Cup Sevens from July 20 to 22.

=== Monster Jam ===
Monster Jam attended the venue from 2004 to 2007 and returned for the first time in 17 years in January 2024.

=== Other events ===
The stadium hosted an AMA Supercross Championship round from 2003 to 2010. Supercross returned for the first time in 14 years in January 2024.

The Mavericks big-wave surfing contest is broadcast live on the giant video display at Oracle Park when the event is held. In 2006, the park hosted ICER AIR the first stadium big-air ski and snowboard competition to be held in the United States.

San Francisco Opera partnered with Giants Enterprises to do three broadcasts, most recently Tosca, in June and September 2009.

In summer 2010, the park hosted an audition stop for the 2011 (10th) season of American Idol.

In October 2013, rapper Kanye West rented out the stadium and the scoreboard for a private event, which turned out to be an elaborate marriage proposal to his girlfriend, reality personality Kim Kardashian.

Starting in 2015, the stadium began hosting commencement exercises for San Francisco State University.

During the finale of The Amazing Race 30, the park was the first location visited by teams after they arrived in San Francisco, with teams having to find a clue next to the Willie Mays Statue and then kayaking for baseballs in McCovey Cove.

American singer-songwriter and actress Lady Gaga headlined Oracle Park on two occasions, in August 2017 on her Joanne World Tour, and once again in September 2022 during The Chromatica Ball. The latter concert became the highest grossing show in the stadium's history.

South Korean female group BLACKPINK headlined Oracle Park on August 22, 2023, for their Born Pink World Tour making them the first female Korean group to sell out an MLB Stadium.

South Korean boy band Stray Kids headlined Oracle Park on May 28, 2025 for their Dominate World Tour, becoming the first South Korean boy band to sell out an MLB Stadium.

Colombian singer-songwriter Shakira performed in the stadium on June 30, 2025 as part of her Las Mujeres Ya No Lloran World Tour. She was the first Latin act to headline a concert.

== See also ==
- 49-Mile Scenic Drive
- Sports in the San Francisco Bay Area
- Chase Center

Events and tenants
Preceded by first stadium	Home of the Fight Hunger Bowl; 2002–2013	Succeeded by Levi's Stadium
Preceded by PNC Park	Host of the MLB All-Star Game; 2007	Succeeded by Yankee Stadium
Preceded by Dodger Stadium	World Baseball Classic; Final Venue; 2013	Succeeded by Dodger Stadium
Preceded by Luzhniki Stadium; Russia	Rugby World Cup Sevens; Venue; 2018	Succeeded by TBA
