= Reese and Robinson Monument =

Statue of Jackie Robinson and Pee Wee Reese in Brooklyn, New York

- Artist: William Behrends
- Year: 2005
- Medium: Bronze
- Subject: Jackie Robinson; Pee Wee Reese
- Location: Maimonides Park, Coney Island, Brooklyn; New York City, U.S.; 40°34′28″N 73°59′03″W

The Reese and Robinson Monument is a bronze statue created by William Behrends which is located in at Maimonides Park in Brooklyn, New York, home field of the minor league Brooklyn Cyclones. The monument depicts Baseball Hall of Famers Jackie Robinson and Pee Wee Reese, both of whom played for the Brooklyn Dodgers.

The statue is a memorial to an incident that is alleged to have occurred during Robinson's rookie year, where Reese, in response to racist heckles against his teammate in Cincinnati against the Cincinnati Reds, went over to him and put his arm around Robinson's shoulder. The scene was also depicted in 42, a biopic about Robinson. However, it is disputed whether this event occurred or whether it happened as it was told. Regardless, Reese was Robinson's ally and friend during their time as teammates and stood by him.

Robinson's widow, Rachel Robinson, at the dedication of the statue, called it: "It's a historic symbol of a wonderful legacy of friendship, of teamwork, of courage – of a lot of things we hope we will be able to pass on to young people. And we hope they will be motivated by it, be inspired by it, and think about what it would be like to stand up, dare to challenge the status quo, and find a friend there who will come over and support you."

In 2013, the statue was defaced with racist and antisemitic graffiti.
