= Statue of Juan Marichal =

Statue in San Francisco, California, USA

- Statue of Marichal outside Lefty O'Doul gate, Oracle Park
- Artist: William Behrends
- Year: 2005
- Subject: Juan Marichal
- Location: Oracle Park San Francisco, California, U.S.; 37.77659°N 122.38755°W

A bronze statue of San Francisco Giants pitcher Juan Marichal was unveiled outside the main entrance of Oracle Park, in San Francisco, California on May 22, 2005. The Dominican-born Marichal is considered to be one of the greatest pitchers in the history of baseball, and was the winningest pitcher of the 1960s.

The statue is located in front of the "Lefty O'Doul" entrance. The statue was dedicated in 2005 at SBC Park (as it was known at the time). It depicts Marichal's signature high kick.
