= Statue of Tony Gwynn =

Statue in San Diego, California, U.S.

Tony Gwynn
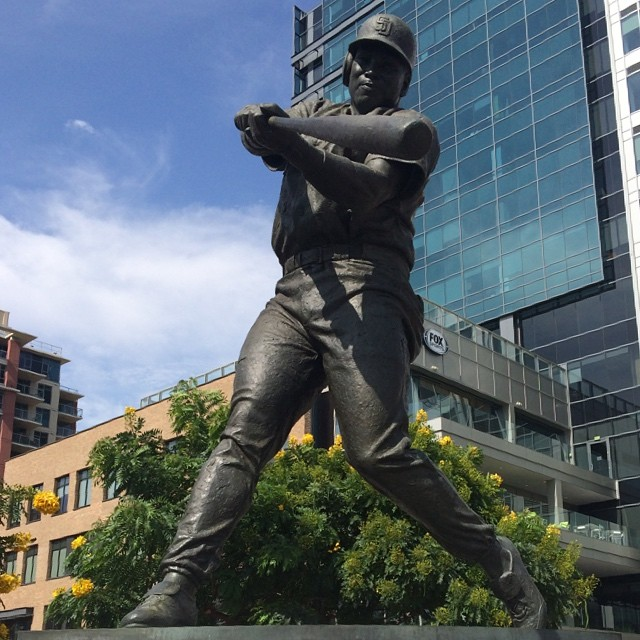
- The statue in 2014
- Artist: William Behrends
- Year: 2007
- Medium: Bronze sculpture
- Subject: Tony Gwynn
- Location: San Diego, California, U.S.; 32°42′32″N 117°09′24″W

Tony Gwynn is a bronze sculpture by William Behrends depicting the baseball player Tony Gwynn, installed outside San Diego's Petco Park, in the U.S. state of California.

== Description ==
The bronze statue is 9.5 feet tall. An inscription on the front of the statue's base reads, "Tony Gwynn, Mr. Padre". The reverse side of the base has an inscription by Gwynn's father: "If you work hard, good things will happen."

== History ==
- The sculpture was installed in 2007.
- Fans gathered at the sculpture to pay tribute to Gwynn, following his death in 2014.

== See also ==
- 2007 in art
