= Statue of Tom Seaver =

Sculpture in Queens, New York City

Coordinates: 40°45′25″N 73°50′45″W

- Artist: William Behrends
- Year: 2022
- Medium: Bronze sculpture
- Subject: Tom Seaver
- Location: Citi Field Queens, New York, U.S.

On April 15, 2022, at their season home opener, the New York Mets unveiled a statue of Baseball Hall of Fame pitcher Tom Seaver. Created by sculptor William Behrends, the statue is located just outside Citi Field.

The statue is notably the first one to be erected outside one of New York City's major sports stadiums in honor of one of the city's iconic sports figures.

== Background ==
The statue was announced in June 2019, a few months after it was revealed that Seaver was withdrawing from public life due to dementia. The Wilpons, then owner of the Mets, also announced that the address for Citi Field was being changed to 41 Seaver Way. Initially meant to be unveiled in 2020, the COVID-19 pandemic delayed the ceremony. In August 2020, Seaver died due to complications from dementia and COVID-19, much to the dismay of fans who had long asked for Seaver to be honored during his lifetime.

Being on the most iconic figures in New York City sports, and arguably the greatest player in New York Mets history, there was considerable push for Seaver to be honored during his life. The announcement of the statue only after Seaver's diagnosis caused disappointment and arguments that the event should have taken place a lot sooner. Seaver's ex-teammates Ed Kranepool and Ron Swoboda both noted it should have been done sooner: "It's good that it was finally done. We could say it should've been done years before that."

== Unveiling ceremony ==
The ceremony was held on April 15, 2022 – coinciding with Jackie Robinson Day – with Seaver's widow Nancy and his daughters Sarah and Annie in attendance. Speaking at the unveiling was Mets Hall of Famer Mike Piazza, Queens borough president Donovan Richards, and new Mets owner Steve Cohen. Speaking at the ceremony, Cohen said:

"There is a reason he was called 'The Franchise.' You can't measure what Tom Seaver meant to this organization. This magnificent statue will be a wonderful daily reminder to Mets fans coming to Citi Field that Tom Seaver is forever a Mets legend."

== Description ==
The statue, created by William Behrends who has made statues of other baseball greats, is made of bronze and stands 10 feet high from the granite base which is molded to look like a pitcher's mound. It weighs around 2,000 lbs with an additional 1,200 lbs of stainless steel.

It is located next to the old Home Run Apple from Shea Stadium just outside the home plate entrance of Citi Field and depicts Seaver striding towards homeplate in his iconic drop-and-drive delivery.

The inscription on the base of the statue says:

GEORGE THOMAS SEAVER.

41.

"THE FRANCHISE"
NY METS 1967-1977, 1983

TOM SEAVER ARRIVED IN QUEENS AND TURNED AROUND THE FORTUNES OF THE NEW YORK METS, LEADING TO THE NICKNAME "THE FRANCHISE".
NAMED THE 1967 NATIONAL LEAGUE ROOKIE OF THE YEAR, SEAVER LED THE MIRACLE METS TO CLUB'S FIRST WORLD SERIES CHAMPIONSHIP IN 1969.
ONE OF THE MOST DOMINANT PITCHERS IN MAJOR LEAGUE HISTORY, SEAVER WAS A THREE-TIME CY YOUNG AWARD WINNER AND A MEMBER OF THE EXCLUSIVE 300-WIN CLUB, FINISHING HIS CAREER WITH 311 WINS.
HE SET FRANCHISE RECORDS FOR WINS (198), STRIKEOUTS (2,541) AND COMPLETE GAMES (171) AND WAS HONORED BY THE METS IN 1988 WITH HIS INDUCTION INTO THE METS HALL OF FAME AND THE RETIREMENT OF HIS UNIFORM NUMBER 41.
SEAVER WAS INDUCTED INTO THE NATIONAL BASEBALL HALL OF FAME IN 1992.

The statue has a notable error with regards to the number on the jersey. The font used on the back of the jersey is incorrect: the No. 41 on the back of the statue features the incorrect font for the number 4, not matching the font the Mets have used since 1962. Behrends admitted to the error, calling it an "embarrassment" and overlooked detail on his part.
