= Statue of Willie Mays =

Statue in San Francisco, California, USA

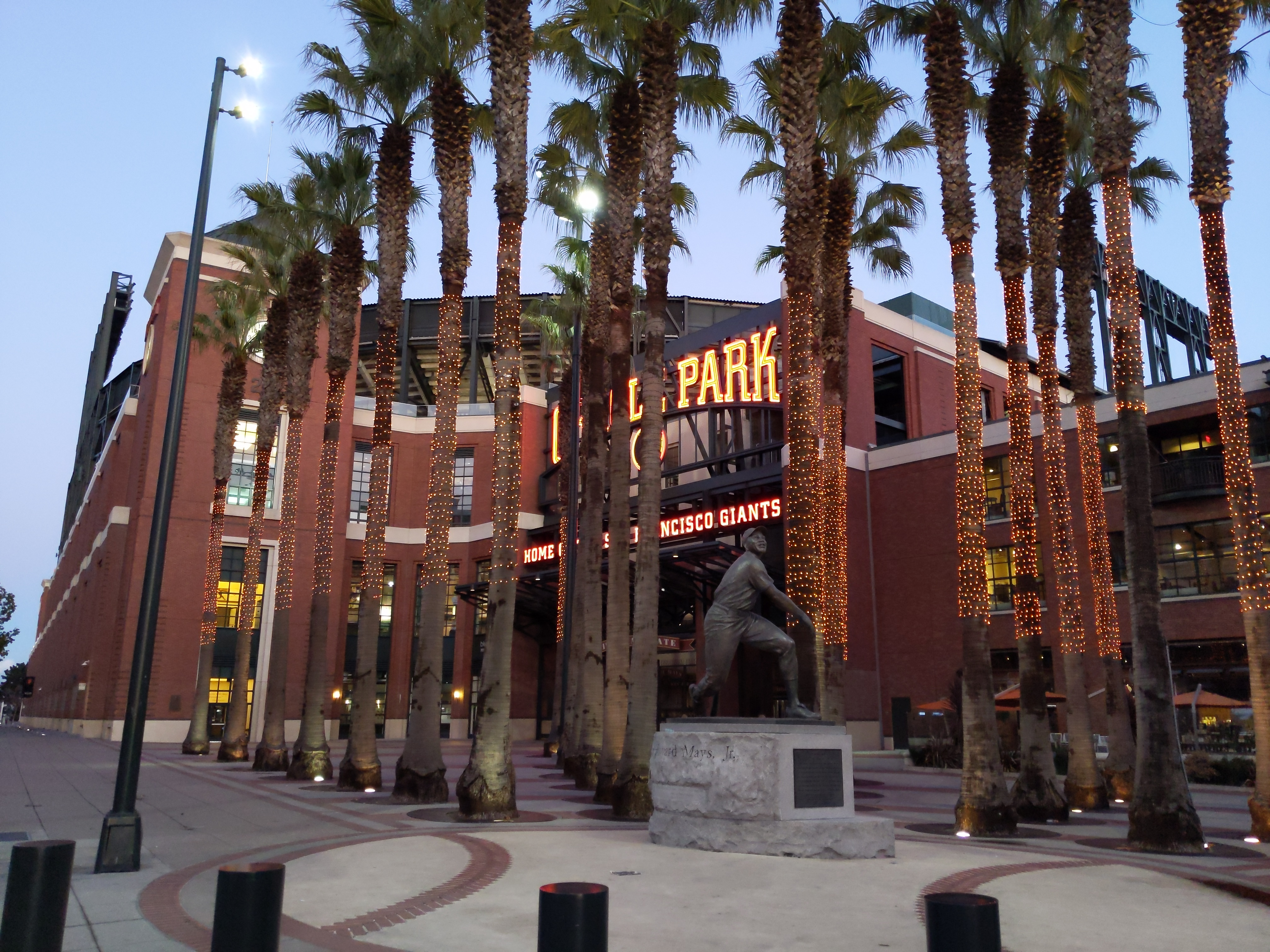
- Statue of Mays outside the "Willie Mays Gate" at Oracle Park
- Artist: William Behrends
- Year: 2000
- Subject: Willie Mays
- Location: Oracle Park San Francisco, California, U.S.; 37.77659°N 122.38755°W

A bronze statue of baseball player Willie Mays was unveiled outside the main entrance of Oracle Park, in San Francisco, California on March 31, 2000. A native of Westfield, Alabama, Mays is considered to be one of the greatest players in the history of baseball.

The statue is located in front of the ballpark entrance at 24 Willie Mays Plaza and is surrounded with 24 palm trees, in honor of his uniform number 24 which was retired by the San Francisco Giants. The statue was dedicated prior to the opening of the Pacific Bell Park (as it was known at the time).

== Information ==
The statue was commissioned by Giants managing partner Peter Magowan in 1997 when ground was broken for the new ballpark for the San Francisco Giants. It was sculpted by William Behrends.

Initially, Magowan wanted to depict Mays' famous catch in Game 1 of the 1954 World Series but Mays objected, later telling the San Francisco Chronicle that if the statue were to be accurately positioned in relation to the field, the "back end is going to be sticking out coming into the ballpark." Instead, the nine-foot-tall statue depicts Mays at bat, following through on his swing.

Since the dedication, the phrase "Meet me at Willie" has become an unofficial motto for Giants' fans meeting at Oracle Park.

Upon Mays' death on June 18, 2024, baseball fans left tributes and paid their respects at the base of the statue which became an informal memorial.
