= William Behrends =

American sculptor

- Born: c. 1946; Tryon, North Carolina, U.S.
- Education: North Carolina State University (B.A.); University of North Carolina at Chapel Hill (M.F.A.)
- Known for: Sculpting statues of baseball players
- Website: williambehrendssculpture.com

William Frederick Behrends (born 1946) is an American sculptor who is best known for creating statues of iconic American sports figures, notably baseball players.

== Notable works ==
Behrends created all the statues for the San Francisco Giants at Oracle Park:

- Statue of Willie Mays (created 2000)
- Statue of Willie McCovey (created 2003)
- Statue of Juan Marichal (created 2005)
- Statue of Orlando Cepeda (created 2008)
- Statue of Gaylord Perry (created 2016)

He also created the statue of Tom Seaver at Citi Field, the statue of Tony Gwynn at Petco Park, the statues of Hank Aaron and Buck O'Neil at the National Baseball Hall of Fame and Museum, and a statue of Pee Wee Reese and Jackie Robinson in MCU Park in Brooklyn.

He also created the busts of Spiro Agnew, Al Gore, and Dick Cheney for the U.S. Senate's vice presidential bust collection.

Additionally, Behrands annually sculpts the faces of winners of the Indianapolis 500 race onto the Borg-Warner Trophy.

== Personal life ==
A native of North Carolina, Behrends maintains a studio in Tryon, North Carolina. He studied architecture at North Carolina State University and earned a master's degree in fine arts and sculpture at the University of North Carolina at Chapel Hill.
