= 1963 Los Angeles Dodgers season =

Major League Baseball season

1963 Los Angeles Dodgers
- World Series champions National League champions
- League: National League
- Ballpark: Dodger Stadium
- City: Los Angeles
- Record: 99–63 (.611)
- League place: 1st
- Owners: Walter O'Malley, James & Dearie Mulvey
- President: Walter O'Malley
- General managers: Buzzie Bavasi
- Managers: Walter Alston
- Television: KTTV–TV 11 (Vin Scully, Jerry Doggett)
- Radio: KFI–AM 640 (Vin Scully, Jerry Doggett); KWKW–AM 1330 (Jose Garcia, Jaime Jarrín)

The 1963 Los Angeles Dodgers season was the 74th season for the Los Angeles Dodgers franchise in Major League Baseball (MLB), their 6th season in Los Angeles, California, and their 2nd season playing their home games at Dodger Stadium in Los Angeles California. The Dodgers were led by pitcher Sandy Koufax, who won both the Cy Young Award and the Most Valuable Player Award. The team went 99–63 to win the National League title by six games over the runner-up St. Louis Cardinals and beat the New York Yankees in four games to win the World Series, marking the first time that the Yankees were ever swept in the postseason.

== Offseason ==
- October 14, 1962: Norm Sherry and Dick Smith was purchased from the Dodgers by the New York Mets.
- November 26, 1962: Stan Williams was traded by the Dodgers to the New York Yankees for Bill Skowron.
- November 30, 1962: Tim Harkness and Larry Burright were traded by the Dodgers to the New York Mets for Bob Miller.
- January 24, 1963: Scott Breeden (minors) was traded by the Dodgers to the Cincinnati Reds for Don Zimmer.
- April 1, 1963: Duke Snider was purchased from the Dodgers by the New York Mets.

== Regular season ==
=== Season standings ===
National League
Team	W	L	Pct.	GB	Home	Road
Los Angeles Dodgers	99	63	.611	—	50‍–‍31	49‍–‍32
St. Louis Cardinals	93	69	.574	6	53‍–‍28	40‍–‍41
San Francisco Giants	88	74	.543	11	50‍–‍31	38‍–‍43
Philadelphia Phillies	87	75	.537	12	45‍–‍36	42‍–‍39
Cincinnati Reds	86	76	.531	13	46‍–‍35	40‍–‍41
Milwaukee Braves	84	78	.519	15	45‍–‍36	39‍–‍42
Chicago Cubs	82	80	.506	17	43‍–‍38	39‍–‍42
Pittsburgh Pirates	74	88	.457	25	42‍–‍39	32‍–‍49
Houston Colt .45s	66	96	.407	33	44‍–‍37	22‍–‍59
New York Mets	51	111	.315	48	34‍–‍47	17‍–‍64

=== Record vs. opponents ===
1963 National League record Sources:
Team	CHC	CIN	HOU	LAD	MIL	NYM	PHI	PIT	SF	STL
Chicago	—	9–9	9–9	7–11	12–6	11–7	9–9	8–10	10–8	7–11
Cincinnati	9–9	—	11–7	8–10	10–8	10–8	8–10	11–7	8–10	11–7
Houston	9–9	7–11	—	5–13	5–13	13–5	8–10	6–12	8–10	5–13
Los Angeles	11–7	10–8	13–5	—	8–10–1	16–2	7–11	13–5	9–9	12–6
Milwaukee	6–12	8–10	13–5	10–8–1	—	12–6	10–8	7–11	10–8	8–10
New York	7–11	8–10	5–13	2–16	6–12	—	8–10	4–14	6–12	5–13
Philadelphia	9–9	10–8	10–8	11–7	8–10	10–8	—	13–5	8–10	8–10
Pittsburgh	10–8	7–11	12–6	5–13	11–7	14–4	5–13	—	5–13	5–13
San Francisco	8–10	10–8	10–8	9–9	8–10	12–6	10–8	13–5	—	8–10
St. Louis	11–7	7–11	13–5	6–12	10–8	13–5	10–8	13–5	10–8	—

=== Opening Day lineup ===
Opening Day starters
Name	Position
Maury Wills	Shortstop
Nate Oliver	Second baseman
Willie Davis	Center fielder
Tommy Davis	Left fielder
Bill Skowron	First baseman
John Roseboro	Catcher
Ron Fairly	Right fielder
Ken McMullen	Third baseman
Don Drysdale	Starting pitcher

=== Notable transactions ===
- June 24, 1963: Don Zimmer was purchased from the Dodgers by the Washington Senators.
- July 20, 1963: Ed Roebuck was traded by the Dodgers to the Washington Senators for Marv Breeding.

=== Roster ===
1963 Los Angeles Dodgers
Roster
Pitchers: 34 Dick Calmus; 53 Don Drysdale; 32 Sandy Koufax; 15 Bob Miller; 17 Phil Ortega; 16 Ron Perranoski; 22 Johnny Podres; 45 Pete Richert; 37 Ed Roebuck; 39 Ken Rowe; 20 Dick Scott; 51 Larry Sherry; 41 Jack Smith; 28 Nick Willhite	Catchers: 35 Doug Camilli; 8 John Roseboro; Infielders: 23 Marv Breeding; 6 Ron Fairly; 19 Jim Gilliam; 26 Derrell Griffith; 11 Ken McMullen; 5 Dick Nen; 29 Nate Oliver; 14 Bill Skowron; 20 Daryl Spencer; 44 Dick Tracewski; 30 Maury Wills; 23 Don Zimmer	Outfielders: 12 Tommy Davis; 3 Willie Davis; 20 Al Ferrara; 25 Frank Howard; 9 Wally Moon; 7 Lee Walls; Other batters: 36 Roy Gleason	Manager: 24 Walter Alston; Coaches: 33 Joe Becker; 2 Leo Durocher; 31 Greg Mulleavy; 27 Pete Reiser

== Game log ==
=== Regular season ===
Legend
	Dodgers win
	Dodgers loss
	Postponement
	Clinched pennant
**Bold**	Dodgers team member

1963 regular season game log: 99–63–1 (Home: 50–31; Away: 49–32–1)
April: 10–11 (Home: 7–7; Away: 3–4)

#	Date	Time (PT)	Opponent	Score	Win	Loss	Save	Time of Game	Attendance	Record	Box/ Streak
1	April 9	11:30 a.m. PST	@ Cubs	**W** 5–1	**Drysdale** (1–0)	Jackson (0–1)	—	2:29	18,589	1–0	W1
2	April 10	11:30 a.m. PST	@ Cubs	**W** 2–1	**Koufax** (1–0)	Buhl (0–1)	—	2:20	2,673	2–0	W2
3	April 11	11:30 a.m. PST	@ Cubs	L 0–2	Ellsworth (1–0)	**Podres** (0–1)	—	1:59	3,735	2–1	L1
4	April 12	7:00 p.m. PST	@ Colt .45s	L 1–2 (12)	Farrell (1–1)	**Roebuck** (0–1)	—	3:09	12,044	2–2	L2
5	April 13	7:00 p.m. PST	@ Colt .45s	**W** 3–1	**Drysdale** (2–0)	Brunet (0–1)	—	2:13	15,164	3–2	W1
6	April 14	1:30 p.m. PST	@ Colt .45s	L 4–5	Nottebart (1–0)	**Koufax** (1–1)	McMahon (1)	2:31	10,180	3–3	L1
7	April 16	8:00 p.m. PST	Cubs	L 1–2 (12)	McDaniel (1–0)	**Roebuck** (0–2)	Schultz (1)	2:43	33,758	3–4	L1
8	April 17	8:00 p.m. PST	Cubs	**W** 1–0 (10)	**Perranoski** (1–0)	Ellsworth (1–1)	—	2:32	15,617	4–4	W1
9	April 18	8:00 p.m. PST	Cubs	L 1–5	Hobbie (1–0)	**Drysdale** (2–1)	Elston (1)	2:40	16,412	4–5	L1
10	April 19	8:00 p.m. PST	Colt .45s	**W** 2–0	**Koufax** (2–1)	Farrell (1–2)	—	1:48	15,654	5–5	W1
11	April 20	1:00 p.m. PST	Colt. 45s	L 6–9	Nottebart (2–0)	**Podres** (0–2)	McMahon (3)	2:44	17,110	5–6	L1
12 (1)	April 21	1:00 p.m. PST	Colt .45s	**W** 11–3	**Miller** (1–0)	Cardinal (0–1)	**Perranoski** (1)	3:02	—	6–6	W1
13 (2)	April 21	4:37 p.m. PST	Colt .45s	**W** 6–5	**Roebuck** (1–2)	Brunet (0–3)	—	2:54	33,196	7–6	W2
14	April 22	8:00 p.m. PST	Braves	L 2–10	Hendley (2–1)	**Drysdale** (2–2)	—	2:42	18,795	7–7	L1
15	April 23	8:00 p.m. PST	Braves	**W** 2–1	**Perranoski** (2–0)	Raymond (2–2)	—	2:15	20,298	8–7	W1
16	April 24	8:00 p.m. PST	Reds	**W** 7–0	**Podres** (1–2)	Owens (0–1)	—	2:30	19,089	9–7	W2
17	April 25	8:00 p.m. PST	Reds	**W** 7–1	**Miller** (2–0)	Jay (0–4)	—	2:23	17,067	10–7	W3
18	April 26	8:00 p.m. PST	Cardinals	7–8	Bauta (1–1)	**Perranoski** (2–1)	Shantz (1)	2:41	24,959	10–8	L1
19	April 27	8:00 p.m. PST	Cardinals	0–3	Washburn (4–0)	**Sherry** (0–1)	—	2:15	33,949	10–9	L2
20	April 28	1:00 p.m. PDT	Cardinals	5–9	Broglio (3–0)	**Podres** (1–3)	Taylor (1)	2:56	36,245	10–10	L3
21	April 29	5:00 p.m. PDT	@ Mets	L 2–4	Craig (2–2)	**Miller** (2–1)	—	2:46	23,494	10–11	L4
—	April 30		@ Mets	Postponed (rain); Makeup: July 10							

May: 17–9–1 (Home: 11–1; Away: 6–8–1)

#	Date	Time (PT)	Opponent	Score	Win	Loss	Save	Time of Game	Attendance	Record	Box/ Streak
—	May 1	5:05 p.m. PDT	@ Phillies	Postponed (rain); Makeup: September 13							
22	May 2	5:05 p.m. PDT	@ Phillies	**W** 3–2	**Perranoski** (3–1)	Mahaffey (2–3)	—	2:16	11,288	11–11	W1
23	May 3	5:15 p.m. PDT	@ Pirates	L 2–13	McBean (2–1)	**Sherry** (0–2)	—	2:21	16,960	11–12	L1
24	May 4	10:35 a.m. PDT	@ Pirates	L 0–5	Schwall (2–0)	**Miller** (2–2)	—	2:05	12,037	11–13	L2
25	May 5	11:05 a.m. PDT	@ Pirates	**W** 7–3	**Perranoski** (4–1)	Law (0–1)	—	2:21	18,743	12–13	W1
26	May 6	10:35 a.m. PDT	@ Pirates	L 4–7	Gibbon (2–0)	**Drysdale** (2–3)	Face (4)	2:41	5,376	12–14	L1
27	May 7	6:00 p.m. PDT	@ Cardinals	11–1	**Koufax** (3–1)	Washburn (5–1)	**Rowe** (1)	2:23	16,609	13–14	W1
28	May 8	6:00 p.m. PDT	@ Cardinals	11–5	**Perranoski** (5–1)	Shantz (1–2)	**Scott** (1)	2:50	10,918	14–14	W2
29	May 9	6:00 p.m. PDT	@ Cardinals	7–10	Gibson (1–1)	**Richert** (0–1)	Fanok (1)	2:56	10,762	14–15	L1
30	May 10	8:00 p.m. PDT	Giants	**W** 2–1	**Drysdale** (3–3)	Sanford (5–2)	—	2:00	50,407	15–15	W1
31	May 11	8:00 p.m. PDT	Giants	**W** 8–0	**Koufax** (4–1)	Marichal (4–3)	—	2:13	49,807	16–15	W2
32	May 12	1:00 p.m. PDT	Giants	**W** 6–5	**Calmus** (1–0)	Fisher (3–3)	**Perranoski** (2)	2:38	43,964	17–15	W3
33	May 14	8:00 p.m. PDT	Phillies	L 1–5	McLish (1–2)	**Drysdale** (3–4)	—	2:34	19,294	17–16	L1
34	May 15	8:00 p.m. PDT	Phillies	**W** 3–2 (12)	**Koufax** (5–1)	Klippstein (1–2)	—	3:08	20,512	18–16	W1
35	May 16	8:00 p.m. PDT	Pirates	**W** 1–0	**Podres** (2–3)	Schwall (2–2)	—	1:50	21,287	19–16	W2
36	May 17	8:00 p.m. PDT	Pirates	**W** 9–3	**Miller** (3–2)	Gibbon (2–1)	**Scott** (2)	2:39	34,216	20–16	W3
37	May 18	1:00 p.m. PDT	Pirates	**W** 6–4	**Drysdale** (4–4)	Law (1–2)	—	2:31	21,140	21–16	W4
38 (1)	May 19	1:00 p.m. PDT	Mets	**W** 1–0	**Koufax** (6–1)	Craig (2–6)	—	1:57	—	22–16	W5
39 (2)	May 19	3:32 p.m. PDT	Mets	**W** 4–2 (13)	**Perranoski** (6–1)	MacKenzie (3–1)	—	3:45	42,541	23–16	W6
40	May 21	8:00 p.m. PDT	Mets	**W** 4–2	**Podres** (3–3)	Cisco (1–4)	—	2:17	21,108	24–16	W7
41	May 22	8:00 p.m. PDT	Mets	**W** 7–3	**Drysdale** (5–4)	Willey (4–3)	—	2:10	22,714	25–16	W8
42	May 24	8:15 p.m. PDT	@ Giants	L 1–7	Marichal (6–3)	**Koufax** (6–2)	—	2:05	40,676	25–17	L1
43	May 25	1:00 p.m. PDT	@ Giants	L 2–6	O'Dell (7–0)	**Podres** (3–4)	Larsen (1)	2:13	39,858	25–18	L2
44	May 26	1:00 p.m. PDT	@ Giants	**W** 4–3 (10)	**Drysdale** (6–4)	Larsen (0–2)	—	2:50	41,668	26–18	W1
45	May 28	6:00 p.m. PDT	@ Braves	**W** 7–0	**Koufax** (7–2)	Lemaster (2–3)	—	2:33	4,573	27–18	W2
46	May 29	6:00 p.m. PDT	@ Braves	T 3–3 (7)	—	—	—	2:02	11,968	27–18–1	T1
47	May 30	6:00 p.m. PDT	@ Braves	L 4–7	Spahn (7–3)	**Drysdale** (6–5)	Raymond (3)	2:32	12,403	27–19–1	L1
48	May 31	6:05 p.m. PDT	@ Reds	L 4–7	Maloney (7–2)	**Roebuck** (1–3)	Worthington (4)	2:45	14,171	27–20–1	L2

June: 16–12 (Home: 5–6; Away: 11–6)

#	Date	Time (PT)	Opponent	Score	Win	Loss	Save	Time of Game	Attendance	Record	Box/ Streak
49	June 1	6:05 p.m. PDT	@ Reds	L 0–1	Jay (2–8)	**Koufax** (7–3)	—	2:16	23,737	27–21–1	L3
50	June 2	11:30 a.m. PDT	@ Reds	L 2–5	O'Toole (9–3)	**Podres** (3–5)	Henry (5)	2:30	18,682	27–22–1	L4
51	June 3	7:00 p.m. PDT	@Colt .45s	L 1–2	Farrell (5–6)	**Drysdale** (6–6)	—	1:57	15,659	27–23–1	L5
52	June 4	7:00 p.m. PDT	@ Colt. 45s	**W** 2–1	**Miller** (4–2)	Drott (2–3)	**Perranoski** (3)	2:21	10,429	28–23–1	W1
53	June 5	7:00 p.m. PDT	@ Colt. 45s	**W** 5–1	**Koufax** (8–3)	Johnson (3–8)	—	2:24	15,365	29–23–1	W2
54	June 7	11:30 a.m. PDT	@ Cubs	**W** 4–1	**Drysdale** (7–6)	Toth (1–3)	—	2:02	12,741	30–23–1	W3
55	June 8	11:30 a.m. PDT	@ Cubs	**W** 9–5	**Perranoski** (7–1)	Elston (2–1)	—	2:36	26,577	31–23–1	W4
56	June 9	11:30 a.m. PDT	@ Cubs	**W** 11–8	**Sherry** (1–2)	Ellsworth (8–4)	—	2:44	35,743	32–23–1	W5
57	June 10	8:00 p.m. PDT	Giants	**W** 7–3	Larsen (1–3)	**Perranoski** (7–2)	—	3:12	52,993	32–24–1	L1
58	June 11	8:00 p.m. PDT	Giants	**W** 3–0	Marichal (9–3)	**Drysdale** (7–7)	—	2:10	53,436	32–25–1	L2
59	June 12	8:00 p.m. PDT	Colt .45s	**W** 9–1	**Podres** (4–5)	Nottebart (5–4)	—	2:08	17,389	33–25–1	W1
60	June 13	8:00 p.m. PDT	Colt .45s	**W** 3–0	**Koufax** (9–3)	Bruce (3–4)	—	2:07	21,873	34–25–1	W2
61	June 14	8:00 p.m. PDT	Cubs	L 1–4	Hobbie (2–5)	**Miller** (4–3)	—	2:36	32,648	34–26–1	L1
62	June 15	1:00 p.m. PDT	Cubs	**W** 4–1	**Drysdale** (8–7)	Jackson (7–6)	—	1:59	22,179	35–26–1	W1
63 (1)	June 16	1:00 p.m. PDT	Cubs	L 3–8	Buhl (6–5)	**Podres** (4–6)	—	2:17	—	35–27–1	L1
64 (2)	June 16	3:52 p.m. PDT	Cubs	**W** 2–0	**Willhite** (1–0)	Toth (1–4)	—	1:54	45,239	36–27–1	W1
65	June 17	8:15 p.m. PDT	@ Giants	**W** 2–0	**Koufax** (10–3)	O'Dell (9–3)	—	2:13	36,818	37–27–1	W2
66	June 18	8:15 p.m. PDT	@ Giants	L 3–9	Sanford (9–5)	**Miller** (4–4)	—	2:21	37,780	37–28–1	L1
67	June 19	1:00 p.m. PDT	@ Giants	L 3–8	Marichal (11–3)	**Drysdale** (8–8)	Pierce (3)	2:32	41,384	37–29–1	L2
68	June 21	6:00 p.m. PDT	@ Cardinals	5–3	**Koufax** (11–3)	Simmons (7–3)	**Perranoski** (4)	2:32	28,423	38–29–1	W1
69	June 22	11:30 a.m. PDT	@ Cardinals	1–2	Gibson (6–3)	**Willhite** (1–1)	Taylor (4)	2:32	20,875	38–30–1	L1
70	June 23	11:30 a.m. PDT	@ Cardinals	4–3	**Miller** (5–4)	Broglio (8–3)	**Perranoski** (5)	2:41	26,553	39–30–1	W1
71	June 24	6:05 p.m. PDT	@ Reds	**W** 5–4	**Drysdale** (9–8)	Jay (3–11)	**Perranoski** (6)	2:35	17,273	40–30–1	W2
72	June 25	6:05 p.m. PDT	@ Reds	**W** 4–1	**Koufax** (12–3)	O'Toole (13–4)	—	2:22	22,831	41–30–1	W3
73	June 26	6:05 p.m. PDT	@ Reds	**W** 5–2	**Perranoski** (8–2)	Maloney (11–3)	—	2:32	19,122	42–30–1	W4
74	June 28	8:00 p.m. PDT	Braves	L 0–1	Spahn (11–3)	**Drysdale** (9–9)	—	2:02	44,894	42–31–1	L1
75	June 29	8:00 p.m. PDT	Braves	**W** 6–5 (11)	**Perranoski** (9–2)	Shaw (3–6)	—	3:06	44,075	43–31–1	W1
76	June 30	1:00 p.m. PDT	Braves	L 0–7	Cloninger (4–4)	**Willhite** (1–2)	—	2:04	29,953	43–32–1	L1

July: 21–10 (Home: 11–6; Away: 10–4)

#	Date	Time (PT)	Opponent	Score	Win	Loss	Save	Time of Game	Attendance	Record	Box/ Streak
77	July 1	8:00 p.m. PDT	Braves	**W** 2–1	**Podres** (5–6)	Sadowski (0–2)	—	1:58	21,603	44–32–1	W1
78	July 2	8:00 p.m. PDT	Cardinals	1–0	**Drysdale** (10–9)	Simmons (7–4)	—	1:48	39,824	45–32–1	W2
79	July 3	8:00 p.m. PDT	Cardinals	5–0	**Koufax** (13–3)	Gibson (7–4)	—	1:53	51,898	46–32–1	W3
80	July 4	8:00 p.m. PDT	Cardinals	10–7	**Roebuck** (2–3)	Broglio (9–4)	**Perranoski** (7)	3:02	30,726	47–32–1	W4
81	July 5	8:00 p.m. PDT	Reds	**W** 1–0	**Podres** (6–6)	O'Toole (13–6)	—	1:35	35,536	48–32–1	W5
82	July 6	1:00 p.m. PDT	Reds	L 1–3	Maloney (13–3)	**Drysdale** (10–10)	—	2:23	27,793	48–33–1	L1
83 (1)	July 7	1:00 p.m. PDT	Reds	**W** 4–0	**Koufax** (14–3)	Purkey (3–5)	—	2:02	—	49–33–1	W1
84 (2)	July 7	3:37 p.m. PDT	Reds	**W** 3–1	**Willhite** (2–2)	Tsitouris (4–3)	**Perranoski** (8)	2:07	53,856	50–33–1	W2
—	July 9	10:00 a.m. PDT	34th All-Star Game	National League vs. American League (Cleveland Municipal Stadium, Cleveland, Ohio)							
85	July 10	5:00 p.m. PDT	@ Mets	**W** 1–0	**Podres** (7–6)	Willey (6–8)	—	1:45	17,106	51–33–1	W3
86	July 11	5:00 p.m. PDT	@ Mets	**W** 4–3	**Drysdale** (11–10)	Craig (2–14)	**Perranoski** (9)	2:16	23,890	52–33–1	W4
87	July 12	5:00 p.m. PDT	@ Mets	**W** 6–0	**Koufax** (15–3)	Jackson (6–10)	—	2:19	34,889	53–33–1	W5
88	July 13	11:00 a.m. PDT	@ Mets	**W** 11–2	**Miller** (6–4)	Stallard (3–7)	—	2:51	21,461	54–33–1	W6
89	July 14	10:35 a.m. PDT	@ Phillies	**W** 3–2 (6)	**Podres** (8–6)	McLish (9–5)	—	1:37	23,542	55–33–1	W7
90	July 15	5:05 p.m. PDT	@ Phillies	L 4–5 (11)	Baldschun (7–4)	**Roebuck** (2–4)	—	3:01	19,488	55–34–1	L1
91 (1)	July 16	3:05 p.m. PDT	@ Phillies	**W** 5–2	**Koufax** (16–3)	Mahaffey (6–10)	—	2:11	—	56–34–1	W1
92 (2)	July 16	5:51 p.m. PDT	@ Phillies	L 2–10	Green (2–3)	**Willhite** (2–3)	—	2:18	35,353	56–35–1	L1
93	July 17	5:15 p.m. PDT	@ Pirates	**W** 3–2	**Miller** (7–4)	Law (4–4)	**Perranoski** (10)	2:39	16,658	57–35–1	W1
94	July 18	5:15 p.m. PDT	@ Pirates	**W** 10–5	**Podres** (9–6)	Francis (3–4)	**Sherry** (1)	3:03	15,883	58–35–1	W2
95	July 19	6:00 p.m. PDT	@ Braves	**W** 4–2	**Drysdale** (12–10)	Hendley (5–6)	—	2:13	18,547	59–35–1	W3
96	July 20	11:30 a.m. PDT	@ Braves	**W** 5–4	**Perranoski** (10–2)	Raymond (4–5)	—	2:42	11,804	60–35–1	W4
97 (1)	July 21	11:00 a.m. PDT	@ Braves	L 2–7	Sadowski (1–4)	**Miller** (7–5)	Shaw (7)	2:30	—	60–36–1	L1
98 (2)	July 21	2:05 p.m. PDT	@ Braves	L 7–13	Cloninger (7–6)	**Sherry** (1–3)	—	3:07	28,534	60–37–1	L2
99	July 23	8:00 p.m. PDT	Pirates	**W** 6–0	**Podres** (10–6)	Friend (11–9)	—	2:26	33,167	61–37–1	W1
100	July 24	8:00 p.m. PDT	Pirates	**W** 5–1	**Drysdale** (13–10)	Francis (3–5)	—	2:09	30,462	62–37–2	W2
101	July 25	8:00 p.m. PDT	Pirates	L 2–6	Sisk (1–0)	**Koufax** (16–4)	—	2:19	41,154	62–38–1	L1
102	July 26	8:00 p.m. PDT	Phillies	L 5–6	Short (3–8)	**Miller** (7–6)	Baldschun (11)	2:48	30,589	62–39–1	L2
103	July 27	8:00 p.m. PDT	Phillies	L 1–4	Bennett (3–0)	**Podres** (10–7)	Klippstein (6)	2:26	36,262	62–40–1	L3
104	July 28	1:00 p.m. PDT	Phillies	L 4–7	Boozer (2–2)	**Drysdale** (13–11)	—	2:38	32,996	62–41–1	L4
105	July 29	8:00 p.m. PDT	Phillies	**W** 6–2	**Koufax** (17–4)	McLish (10–6)	—	2:14	32,835	63–41–1	W1
106	July 30	8:00 p.m. PDT	Mets	L 1–5	Stallard (4–9)	**Miller** (7–7)	—	2:21	24,515	63–42–1	L1
107	July 31	8:00 p.m. PDT	Mets	**W** 5–3	**Richert** (1–1)	Craig (2–19)	**Perranoski** (11)	2:20	24,589	64–42–1	W1

August: 16–12 (Home: 6–6; Away: 10–6)

#	Date	Time (PT)	Opponent	Score	Win	Loss	Save	Time of Game	Attendance	Record	Box/ Streak
108	August 2	7:00 p.m. PDT	@ Colt .45s	L 1–4	Farrell (9–8)	**Drysdale** (13–12)	—	1:55	13,054	64–43–1	L1
109	August 3	7:00 p.m. PDT	@ Colt .45s	**W** 2–0	**Koufax** (18–4)	Bruce (5–8)	—	2:00	25,473	65–43–1	W1
110	August 4	1:30 p.m. PDT	@ Colt .45s	**W** 4–0	**Podres** (11–7)	Johnson (6–15)	**Sherry** (2)	2:09	14,237	66–43–1	W2
111	August 6	11:30 a.m. PDT	@ Cubs	**W** 4–1	**Drysdale** (14–12)	Jackson (12–10)	—	1:58	15,276	67–43–1	W3
112	August 7	11:30 a.m. PDT	@ Cubs	**W** 3–1 (11)	**Perranoski** (11–2)	McDaniel (7–5)	—	2:53	27,184	68–43–1	W4
113	August 8	11:30 a.m. PDT	@ Cubs	L 4–5 (10)	McDaniel (8–5)	**Sherry** (1–4)	—	2:18	16,408	68–44–1	L1
114	August 9	6:05 p.m. PDT	@ Reds	L 4–8	Nuxhall (10–5)	**Podres** (11–8)	Worthington (7)	2:50	18,178	68–45–1	L2
115	August 10	6:05 p.m. PDT	@ Reds	**W** 10–3	**Drysdale** (15–12)	Purkey (5–8)	—	2:47	29,034	69–45–1	W1
116	August 11	12 Noon PDT	@ Reds	L 4–9	O'Toole (15–9)	**Koufax** (18–5)	Worthington (8)	2:25	26,195	69–46–1	L1
117	August 13	6:00 p.m. PDT	@ Braves	L 3–4	Spahn (14–5)	**Miller** (7–8)	—	2:13	13,529	69–47–1	L1
118	August 14	6:00 p.m. PDT	@ Braves	L 3–5	Sadowski (2–5)	**Drysdale** (15–13)	Lemaster (1)	2:32	13,429	69–48–1	L2
119	August 15	6:00 p.m. PDT	@ Braves	**W** 7–5	**Perranoski** (12–2)	Fischer (4–3)	—	2:43	13,425	70–48–1	W1
120	August 16	5:00 p.m. PDT	@ Mets	**W** 9–7	**Perranoski** (13–2)	Bearnarth (2–4)	**Miller** (1)	2:53	31,405	71–48–1	W2
121	August 17	11:00 a.m. PDT	@ Mets	**W** 3–2	**Koufax** (19–5)	Stallard (6–11)	**Perranoski** (12)	2:45	21,841	72–48–1	W3
122 (1)	August 18	11:05 a.m. PDT	@ Mets	**W** 7–0	**Drysdale** (16–13)	Jackson (8–15)	—	2:25	—	73–48–1	W4
123 (2)	August 18	2:05 p.m. PDT	@ Mets	**W** 3–2	**Calmus** (2–0)	Willey (7–11)	—	2:36	46,184	74–48–1	W5
124	August 20	8:00 p.m. PDT	Cardinals	7–5	**Miller** (8–8)	Burdette (8–10)	—	2:45	50,122	75–48–1	W6
125	August 21	8:00 p.m. PDT	Cardinals	2–1 (16)	**Sherry** (2–4)	Taylor (7–5)	—	3:48	54,125	76–48–1	W7
126	August 22	8:00 p.m. PDT	Cardinals	2–3	Broglio (14–8)	**Drysdale** (16–14)	Jones (2)	2:32	48,569	76–49–1	L1
127	August 23	8:00 p.m. PDT	Braves	L 1–6	Spahn (16–5)	**Calmus** (2–1)	—	2:30	36,013	76–50–1	L2
128	August 24	8:00 p.m. PDT	Braves	L 1–2	Lemaster (10–8)	**Podres** (11–9)	Shaw (12)	2:34	36,479	76–51–1	L3
129	August 25	1:00 p.m. PDT	Braves	**W** 2–1	**Miller** (9–8)	Shaw (5–10)	—	2:29	32,137	77–51–1	W1
130	August 26	8:00 p.m. PDT	Reds	L 1–3	O'Toole (16–11)	**Drysdale** (16–15)	—	2:09	36,694	77–52–1	L1
131	August 27	8:00 p.m. PDT	Reds	**W** 3–2	**Richert** (2–1)	Purkey (6–9)	**Perranoski** (13)	2:14	28,070	78–52–1	W1
132	August 28	8:00 p.m. PDT	Reds	L 5–9	Maloney (19–6)	**Podres** (11–10)	Jay (1)	2:32	28,921	78–53–1	L1
133	August 29	8:00 p.m. PDT	Giants	**W** 11–1	**Koufax** (20–5)	Pierce (3–10)	—	2:38	54,978	79–53–1	W1
134	August 30	8:00 p.m. PDT	Giants	**W** 3–1	**Drysdale** (17–15)	Marichal (19–8)	—	2:34	54,843	80–53–1	W2
135	August 31	8:00 p.m. PDT	Giants	L 3–4 (12)	Larsen (6–5)	**Sherry** (2–5)	—	3:25	54,858	80–54–1	L1

September: 19–9 (Home: 10–5; Away: 9–4)

#	Date	Time (PT)	Opponent	Score	Win	Loss	Save	Time of Game	Attendance	Record	Box/ Streak
136	September 1	1:00 p.m. PDT	Giants	**W** 5–3	**Calmus** (3–1)	Larsen (6–6)	**Podres** (1)	3:42	54,263	81–54–1	W1
137 (1)	September 2	1:00 p.m. PDT	Colt .45s	**W** 7–3	**Koufax** (21–5)	Farrell (10–12)	—	2:16	—	82–54–1	W2
138 (2)	September 2	3:51 p.m. PDT	Colt .45s	**W** 7–1	**Podres** (12–10)	Zachary (0–2)	**Perranoski** (14)	2:14	39,378	83–54–1	W3
139	September 3	8:00 p.m. PDT	Colt .45s	**W** 4–3 (10)	**Perranoski** (14–2)	Farrell (10–13)	—	2:24	23,235	84–54–1	W4
140	September 4	8:00 p.m. PDT	Cubs	L 1–2 (11)	McDaniel (11–6)	**Rowe** (0–1)	—	3:23	21,840	84–55–1	L1
141	September 5	8:00 p.m. PDT	Cubs	**W** 4–0	**Richert** (3–1)	Buhl (9–13)	**Sherry** (3)	2:23	35,256	85–55–1	W1
142	September 6	8:15 p.m. PDT	@ Giants	**W** 5–2	**Koufax** (22–5)	O'Dell (12–7)	**Perranoski** (15)	2:35	38,161	86–55–1	W2
143	September 7	1:00 p.m. PDT	@ Giants	L 3–5	Marichal (21–8)	**Drysdale** (17–16)	—	2:04	36,879	86–56–1	L1
144	September 8	1:00 p.m. PDT	@ Giants	L 4–5	Larsen (7–6)	**Perranoski** (14–3)	—	2:45	38,569	86–57–1	L2
145	September 10	5:15 p.m. PDT	@ Pirates	**W** 4–2	**Koufax** (23–5)	Cardwell (13–14)	—	2:19	11,152	87–57–1	W5
146	September 11	5:15 p.m. PDT	@ Pirates	**W** 9–4	**Richert** (4–1)	Veale (2–2)	**Perranoski** (16)	2:32	8,514	88–57–1	W6
147	September 12	5:15 p.m. PDT	@ Pirates	**W** 5–3	**Podres** (13–10)	Friend (16–15)	**Perranoski** (17)	2:04	2,644	89–57–1	W7
148 (1)	September 13	3:05 p.m. PDT	@ Phillies	L 2–3	Short (7–11)	**Sherry** (2–6)	—	2:21	—	89–58–1	L1
149 (2)	September 13	6:01 p.m. PDT	@ Phillies	**W** 2–1	**Perranoski** (15–3)	Bennett (8–4)	—	2:32	26,024	90–58–1	W1
150	September 14	10:35 a.m. PDT	@ Phillies	**W** 5–1	**Richert** (5–1)	Boozer (2–4)	—	2:24	10,410	91–58–1	W2
151	September 15	10:35 a.m. PDT	@ Phillies	L 1–6	Green (6–4)	**Drysdale** (17–17)	—	2:09	16,796	91–59–1	L1
152	September 16	6:00 p.m. PDT	@ Cardinals	3–1	**Podres** (14–10)	Shantz (6–4)	**Perranoski** (18)	2:34	32,442	92–59–1	W1
153	September 17	6:00 p.m. PDT	@ Cardinals	4–0	**Koufax** (24–5)	Simmons (15–8)	—	1:51	30,450	93–59–1	W2
154	September 18	6:00 p.m. PDT	@ Cardinals	6–5 (13)	**Perranoski** (16–3)	Burdette (9–12)	—	3:44	25,975	94–59–1	W3
155	September 20	8:00 p.m. PDT	Pirates	**W** 2–0	**Drysdale** (18–17)	Schwall (6–12)	—	2:17	40,476	95–59–1	W4
156	September 21	8:00 p.m. PDT	Pirates	**W** 5–3	**Miller** (10–8)	Sisk (1–1)	—	2:44	48,038	96–59–1	W5
157	September 22	1:00 p.m. PDT	Pirates	L 0–4	Veale (4–2)	**Podres** (14–11)	Face (16)	2:20	36,878	96–60–1	L1
158	September 24	8:00 p.m. PDT	Mets	**W** 4–1	**Drysdale** (19–17)	Stallard (6–17)	**Perranoski** (19)	2:26	27,988	97–60–1	W1
159	September 25	8:00 p.m. PDT	Mets	**W** 1–0	**Koufax** (25–5)	Craig (5–22)	**Perranoski** (20)	2:08	24,181	98–60–1	W2
160	September 26	8:00 p.m. PDT	Mets	**W** 5–4	**Rowe** (1–1)	Cisco (7–15)	**Perranoski** (21)	2:15	18,546	99–60–1	W3
161	September 27	8:00 p.m. PDT	Phillies	L 3–5	Boozer (3–4)	**Richert** (5–2)	Duren (2)	2:40	34,689	99–61–1	L1
162	September 28	8:00 p.m. PDT	Phillies	L 3–12	Bennett (9–5)	**Podres** (14–12)	—	2:21	37,212	99–62–1	L2
163	September 29	1:00 p.m. PDT	Phillies	L 1–3	Short (9–12)	**Richert** (5–3)	—	2:31	19,237	99–63–1	L3

=== Detailed records ===
**National League**
Opponent	Home	Away	Total	Pct.	Runs scored	Runs allowed
Chicago Cubs	4–5	7–2	11–7	.611	60	47
Cincinnati Reds	6–3	4–5	10–8	.556	70	59
Houston Colt .45s	8–1	5–4	13–5	.722	78	41
**Los Angeles Dodgers**	—	—	—	—	—	—
Milwaukee Braves	4–5	4–5	8–10	.444	61	84
New York Mets	8–1	8–1	16–2	.889	78	40
Philadelphia Phillies	2–7	5–4	7–11	.389	54	78
Pittsburgh Pirates	7–2	6–3	13–5	.722	80	65
San Francisco Giants	6–3	3–6	9–9	.500	68	70
St. Louis Cardinals	5–4	7–2	12–6	.667	91	66
	**50–31**	**49–32**	**99–63**	**.611**	**640**	**550**

==== Month-by-Month ====
Month	Games	Won	Lost	Win %	RS	RA
April	21	10	11	0.476	75	72
May	27	17	9	0.654	122	106
June	28	16	12	0.571	97	93
July	31	21	10	0.677	129	103
August	28	16	12	0.571	112	94
September	28	19	9	0.679	105	82
Total	163	99	63	0.611	640	550

	Games	Won	Lost	Win %	RS	RA
Home	81	51	30	0.630	296	248
Road	82	48	33	0.593	344	302
Total	163	99	63	0.611	640	550

=== Composite Box ===
1963 Los Angeles Dodgers Inning–by–Inning Boxscore
Team	1	2	3	4	5	6	7	8	9	10	11	12	13	14	15	16	R	H	E
Opponents	71	53	54	55	58	94	61	60	36	3	2	3	0	0	0	0	550	1329	158
Dodgers	77	65	74	84	64	59	65	75	54	5	3	1	3	0	0	1	640	1361	159

=== Postseason Game log ===
1963 Postseason game log: 4–0 (Home: 2–0; Away: 2–0)
World Series vs. New York Yankees 4–0 (Home: 2–0; Away: 2–0)

#	Date	Time (PT)	Opponent	Score	Win	Loss	Save	Time of Game	Attendance	Series	Box/ Streak
1	October 2	10:00 a.m. PDT	@ Yankees	5–2	**Koufax** (1–0)	Ford (0–1)	—	2:09	69,000	LAN 1–0	W1
2	October 3	10:00 a.m. PDT	@ Yankees	4–1	**Podres** (1–0)	Downing (0–1)	**Perranoski** (1)	2:13	66,455	LAN 2–0	W2
3	October 5	1:00 p.m. PDT	Yankees	1–0	**Drysdale** (1–0)	Bouton (0–1)	—	2:05	55,912	LAN 3–0	W3
4	October 6	1:00 p.m. PDT	Yankees	2–1	**Koufax** (2–0)	Ford (0–2)	—	1:50	55,912	LAN 4–0	W4

== Starting Lineups ==
=== Regular Season ===
==== Batting Order ====
1963 Regular Season Batting Order game log
April

#	Date	Opponent	1st	2nd	3rd	4th	5th	6th	7th	8th	9th
18	April 26	STL									#53; Drysdale (SP)
19	April 27	STL									#51; Sherry (SP)
20	April 28	STL									#22; Podres (SP)

May

#	Date	Opponent	1st	2nd	3rd	4th	5th	6th	7th	8th	9th
27	May 7	@ STL									#32; Koufax (SP)
28	May 8	@ STL									#15; Miller (SP)
29	May 9	@ STL									#45; Richert (SP)

June

#	Date	Opponent	1st	2nd	3rd	4th	5th	6th	7th	8th	9th
68	June 21	@ STL									#32; Koufax (SP)
69	June 22	@ STL									#28; Willhite (SP)
70	June 23	@ STL									#22; Podres (SP)

July

#	Date	Opponent	1st	2nd	3rd	4th	5th	6th	7th	8th	9th
78	July 2	STL									#53; Drysdale (SP)
79	July 3	STL									#32; Koufax (SP)
80	July 4	STL									#15; Miller (SP)

August

#	Date	Opponent	1st	2nd	3rd	4th	5th	6th	7th	8th	9th
124	August 20	STL									#22; Podres (SP)
125	August 21	STL									#32; Koufax (SP)
126	August 22	STL									#53; Drysdale (SP)

September

#	Date	Opponent	1st	2nd	3rd	4th	5th	6th	7th	8th	9th
152	September 16	@ STL									#22; Podres (SP)
153	September 17	@ STL									#32; Koufax (SP)
154	September 18	@ STL									#45; Richert (SP)

==== Defensive Lineup ====
1963 Regular Season Defensive Lineup game log
April

#	Date	Opponent	C	1B	2B	3B	SS	LF	CF	RF	P
18	April 26	STL									#53; Drysdale
19	April 27	STL									#51; Sherry
20	April 28	STL									#22; Podres

May

#	Date	Opponent	C	1B	2B	3B	SS	LF	CF	RF	P
27	May 7	@ STL									#32; Koufax
28	May 8	@ STL									#15; Miller
29	May 9	@ STL									#45; Richert

June

#	Date	Opponent	C	1B	2B	3B	SS	LF	CF	RF	P
68	June 21	@ STL									#32; Koufax
69	June 22	@ STL									#28; Willhite
70	June 23	@ STL									#22; Podres

July

#	Date	Opponent	C	1B	2B	3B	SS	LF	CF	RF	P	
78	July 2	STL									#53; Drysdale (SP)	#53; Drysdale
79	July 3	STL									#32; Koufax	
80	July 4	STL									#15; Miller	

August

#	Date	Opponent	C	1B	2B	3B	SS	LF	CF	RF	P
124	August 20	STL									#22; Podres
125	August 21	STL									#32; Koufax
126	August 22	STL									#53; Drysdale

September

#	Date	Opponent	C	1B	2B	3B	SS	LF	CF	RF	P
152	September 16	@ STL									#22; Podres
153	September 17	@ STL									#32; Koufax
154	September 18	@ STL									#45; Richert

=== World Series ===
==== Batting Order ====
1963 Postseason Batting Order game log
World Series: vs. New York Yankees

#	Date	Opponent	1st	2nd	3rd	4th	5th	6th	7th	8th	9th
1	October 2	@ NYY	#30; Wills (SS)	#19; Gilliam (3B)	#3; W. Davis (CF)	#12; T. Davis (LF)	#25; Howard (RF)	#14; Skowron (1B)	#44; Tracewski (2B)	#8; Roseboro (C)	#32; Koufax (SP)
2	October 3	@ NYY	#30; Wills (SS)	#19; Gilliam (3B)	#3; W. Davis (CF)	#12; T. Davis (LF)	#25; Howard (RF)	#14; Skowron (1B)	#44; Tracewski (2B)	#8; Roseboro (C)	#22; Podres (SP)
3	October 5	NYY	#30; Wills (SS)	#19; Gilliam (3B)	#3; W. Davis (CF)	#12; T. Davis (LF)	#6; Fairly (RF)	#14; Skowron (1B)	#44; Tracewski (2B)	#8; Roseboro (C)	#53; Drysdale (SP)
4	October 6	NYY	#30; Wills (SS)	#19; Gilliam (3B)	#3; W. Davis (CF)	#12; T. Davis (LF)	#25; Howard (RF)	#14; Skowron (1B)	#44; Tracewski (2B)	#8; Roseboro (C)	#32; Koufax (SP)

==== Defensive Lineup ====
1963 Postseason Defensive Lineup game log
World Series: vs. New York Yankees

#	Date	Opponent	C	1B	2B	3B	SS	LF	CF	RF	P
1	October 2	@ NYY	#8; Roseboro	#14; Skowron	#44; Tracewski	#19; Gilliam	#30; Wills	#12; T. Davis	#3; W. Davis	#25; Howard	#32; Koufax
2	October 3	@ NYY	#8; Roseboro	#14; Skowron	#44; Tracewski	#19; Gilliam	#30; Wills	#12; T. Davis	#3; W. Davis	#25; Howard	#22; Podres
3	October 5	NYY	#8; Roseboro	#14; Skowron	#44; Tracewski	#19; Gilliam	#30; Wills	#12; T. Davis	#3; W. Davis	#6; Fairly	#53; Drysdale
4	October 6	NYY	#8; Roseboro	#14; Skowron	#44; Tracewski	#19; Gilliam	#30; Wills	#12; T. Davis	#3; W. Davis	#25; Howard	#32; Koufax

== Game Umpires ==
=== Regular Season ===
1963 Regular Season Umpire game log
April

#	Date	Opponent	HP	1B	2B	3B
18	April 26	STL	Mel Steiner	Augie Donatelli (crew chief)	Shag Crawford	Tony Venzon
19	April 27	STL	Augie Donatelli (crew chief)	Shag Crawford	Tony Venzon	Mel Steiner
20	April 28	STL	Shag Crawford	Tony Venzon	Mel Steiner	Augie Donatelli (crew chief)

May

#	Date	Opponent	HP	1B	2B	3B
27	May 7	@ STL	Vinnie Smith	Paul Pryor	(none)	Bill Jackowski (crew chief)
28	May 8	@ STL	Paul Pryor	Frank Secory (crew chief)	Bill Jackowski	Vinnie Smith
29	May 9	@ STL	Frank Secory (crew chief)	Bill Jackowski	Vinnie Smith	Paul Pryor

June

#	Date	Opponent	HP	1B	2B	3B
68	June 21	@ STL	Shag Crawford	Tony Venzon	Mel Steiner	Augie Donatelli (crew chief)
69	June 22	@ STL	Tony Venzon	Mel Steiner	Augie Donatelli (crew chief)	Shag Crawford
70	June 23	@ STL	Mel Steiner	Augie Donatelli (crew chief)	Shag Crawford	Tony Venzon

July

#	Date	Opponent	HP	1B	2B	3B
78	July 2	STL	Mel Steiner	Augie Donatelli (crew chief)	Shag Crawford	Tony Venzon
79	July 3	STL	Augie Donatelli (crew chief)	Shag Crawford	Tony Venzon	Mel Steiner
80	July 4	STL	Shag Crawford	Tony Venzon	Mel Steiner	Augie Donatelli (crew chief)

August

#	Date	Opponent	HP	1B	2B	3B
124	August 20	STL	Stan Landes	Ed Sudol	Al Forman	Tom Gorman (crew chief)
125	August 21	STL	Ed Sudol	Al Forman	Tom Gorman (crew chief)	Stan Landes
126	August 22	STL	Al Forman	Tom Gorman (crew chief)	Stan Landes	Ed Sudol

September

#	Date	Opponent	HP	1B	2B	3B
152	September 16	@ STL	Stan Landes	Ed Sudol	Tom Gorman (crew chief)	Al Forman
153	September 17	@ STL	Ed Sudol	Tom Gorman (crew chief)	Al Forman	Stan Landes
154	September 18	@ STL	Tom Gorman (crew chief)	Al Forman	Stan Landes	Ed Sudol

=== World Series ===
1963 Postseason Umpire game log
World Series: vs. New York Yankees

#	Date	Opponent	HP	1B	2B	3B	LF	RF
1	October 2	@ NYY	Joe Paparella (AL) (crew chief)	Tom Gorman (NL)	Larry Napp (AL)	Shag Crawford (NL)	Tony Venzon (NL)	John Rice (AL)
2	October 3	@ NYY	Tom Gorman (NL)	Larry Napp (AL)	Shag Crawford (NL)	Joe Paparella (AL) (crew chief)	Tony Venzon (NL)	John Rice (AL)
3	October 5	NYY	Larry Napp (AL)	Shag Crawford (NL)	Joe Paparella (AL) (crew chief)	Tom Gorman (NL)	John Rice (AL)	Tony Venzon (NL)
4	October 6	NYY	Shag Crawford (NL)	Joe Paparella (AL) (crew chief)	Tom Gorman (NL)	Larry Napp (AL)	John Rice (AL)	Tony Venzon (NL)

== Player stats ==
=== Batting ===
Stats in bold are the team leaders.

==== Starters by position ====
Note: Pos = Position; G = Games played; PA = Plate appearances; AB = At bats; R = Runs scored; H = Hits; 2B = Doubles hit; 3B = Triples hit; HR = Home runs; RBI = Runs batted in; SB = Stolen bases; CS = Caught stealing; BB = Walks; SO = Strikeouts; Avg. = Batting average; OBP = On-base percentage; SLG = Slugging; OPS = On Base + Slugging; TB = Total bases; GDP = Grounded into double play; HBP = Hit by pitch; SH = Sacrifice hits; SF = Sacrifice flies; IBB = Intentional base on balls

Pos	Player	G	PA	AB	R	H	2B	3B	HR	RBI	SB	CS	BB	SO	Avg.	OBP	SLG	OPS	TB	GDP	HBP	SH	SF	IBB
C	John Roseboro	135	518	470	50	111	13	7	9	49	7	6	36	50	.236	.291	.351	.642	165	9	3	2	**7**	3
1B	Ron Fairly	152	564	490	62	133	21	0	12	77	5	2	58	69	.271	.347	.388	.735	190	12	1	11	4	**7**
2B	Jim Gilliam	148	**605**	525	77	148	**27**	4	6	49	19	5	**60**	28	.282	.354	.383	.737	201	11	2	**12**	6	2
3B	Ken McMullen	79	259	233	16	55	9	0	5	28	1	2	20	46	.236	.297	.339	.636	79	9	1	3	2	2
SS	Maury Wills	134	580	527	**83**	159	19	3	0	34	**40**	**19**	44	48	.302	.355	.349	.704	184	3	1	5	3	0
LF	Tommy Davis	146	597	**556**	69	**181**	19	3	16	**88**	15	10	29	59	**.326**	**.359**	**.457**	**.816**	**254**	**17**	**4**	1	**7**	5
CF	Willie Davis	**156**	555	515	60	126	19	**8**	9	60	25	11	25	61	.245	.281	.365	.646	188	9	3	6	6	6
RF	Frank Howard	123	459	417	58	114	16	1	**28**	64	1	2	33	**116**	.273	.330	.518	.848	216	7	**4**	2	3	4

==== Other batters ====
Note: G = Games played; PA = Plate appearances; AB = At bats; R = Runs scored; H = Hits; 2B = Doubles hit; 3B = Triples hit; HR = Home runs; RBI = Runs batted in; SB = Stolen bases; CS = Caught stealing; BB = Walks; SO = Strikeouts; Avg. = Batting average; OBP = On-base percentage; SLG = Slugging; OPS = On Base + Slugging; TB = Total bases; GDP = Grounded into double play; HBP = Hit by pitch; SH = Sacrifice hits; SF = Sacrifice flies; IBB = Intentional base on balls

Player	G	PA	AB	R	H	2B	3B	HR	RBI	SB	CS	BB	SO	Avg.	OBP	SLG	OPS	TB	GDP	HBP	SH	SF	IBB
Wally Moon	122	398	343	41	90	13	2	8	48	5	5	45	43	.262	.345	.382	.727	131	12	1	4	5	5
Bill Skowron	89	256	237	19	48	8	0	4	19	0	1	13	49	.203	.252	.287	.539	68	10	3	2	1	4
Dick Tracewski	104	240	217	23	49	2	1	1	10	2	3	19	39	.226	.287	.248	.545	56	3	0	3	1	1
Nate Oliver	65	178	163	23	39	2	3	1	9	3	4	13	25	.239	.298	.307	.605	50	3	1	0	1	0
Doug Camilli	49	130	117	9	19	1	1	3	10	0	0	11	22	.162	.234	.265	.499	31	4	0	2	0	6
Lee Walls	64	94	86	12	20	1	0	3	11	0	0	7	25	.233	.290	.349	.639	30	4	0	1	0	1
Al Ferrara	21	52	44	2	7	0	0	1	1	0	0	6	9	.159	.275	.227	.502	10	0	1	1	0	0
Marv Breeding	20	40	36	6	6	0	0	0	1	1	0	2	5	.167	.211	.167	.377	6	0	0	2	0	0
Don Zimmer	22	26	23	4	5	1	0	1	2	0	0	3	10	.217	.308	.391	.699	9	1	0	0	0	0
Daryl Spencer	7	13	9	0	1	0	0	0	0	0	0	3	2	.111	.333	.111	.444	1	1	0	1	0	0
Dick Nen	7	11	8	2	1	0	0	1	1	0	0	3	3	.125	.364	.500	.864	4	1	0	0	0	1
Derrell Griffith	1	2	2	0	0	0	0	0	0	0	0	0	0	.000	.000	.000	.000	0	0	0	0	0	0
Roy Gleason	8	1	1	3	1	1	0	0	0	0	0	0	0	1.000	1.000	2.000	3.000	2	0	0	0	0	0

==== Pitchers batting ====
Note: G = Games played; PA = Plate appearances; AB = At bats; R = Runs scored; H = Hits; 2B = Doubles hit; 3B = Triples hit; HR = Home runs; RBI = Runs batted in; SB = Stolen bases; CS = Caught stealing; BB = Walks; SO = Strikeouts; Avg. = Batting average; OBP = On-base percentage; SLG = Slugging; OPS = On Base + Slugging; TB = Total bases; GDP = Grounded into double play; HBP = Hit by pitch; SH = Sacrifice hits; SF = Sacrifice flies; IBB = Intentional base on balls

Player	G	PA	AB	R	H	2B	3B	HR	RBI	SB	CS	BB	SO	Avg.	OBP	SLG	OPS	TB	GDP	HBP	SH	SF	IBB
Sandy Koufax	40	124	110	3	7	0	0	1	7	0	0	6	51	.064	.111	.091	.202	10	2	0	7	1	0
Don Drysdale	42	114	96	5	16	1	1	0	5	0	0	9	35	.167	.241	.198	.439	19	3	1	6	2	0
Johnny Podres	37	71	64	6	9	2	0	1	8	0	0	1	11	.141	.147	.219	.366	14	0	0	3	3	0
Bob Miller	42	65	57	1	4	0	0	0	2	0	0	2	24	.070	.100	.070	.170	4	0	0	5	1	0
Ron Perranoski	69	28	24	1	3	0	0	0	0	0	0	2	15	.125	.192	.125	.317	3	0	0	2	0	0
Pete Richert	20	25	22	1	4	1	0	0	1	0	0	1	9	.182	.217	.227	.445	5	0	0	2	0	0
Larry Sherry	36	12	9	1	1	1	0	0	0	0	0	2	3	.111	.273	.222	.495	2	0	0	1	0	0
Nick Willhite	8	11	10	2	3	1	0	0	0	0	0	0	1	.300	.300	.400	.700	4	0	0	1	0	0
Dick Calmus	21	6	6	0	0	0	0	0	0	0	0	0	5	.000	.000	.000	.000	0	0	0	0	0	0
Ken Rowe	14	5	5	0	0	0	0	0	0	0	0	0	3	.000	.000	.000	.000	0	0	0	0	0	0
Ed Roebuck	29	4	4	1	1	0	0	0	0	0	0	0	0	.250	.250	.250	.500	1	0	0	0	0	0
Jack Smith	4	2	2	0	0	0	0	0	0	0	0	0	1	.000	.000	.000	.000	0	0	0	0	0	0
Phil Ortega	1	0	0	0	0	0	0	0	0	0	0	0	0	----	----	----	----	0	0	0	0	0	0
Dick Scott	9	0	0	0	0	0	0	0	0	0	0	0	0	----	----	----	----	0	0	0	0	0	0

=== Pitching ===
List does not include position players. Stats in bold are the team leaders.

==== Starting pitchers ====
Note: W = Wins; L = Losses; W-L% = Win-Loss Percentage; ERA = Earned run average; G = Games pitched; GS = Games started; GF = Games finished; CG = Complete game; SHO = Shutouts; SV = Saves; IP = Innings pitched; HA = Hits allowed; RA = Runs allowed; ER = Earned runs allowed; HRA = Home runs allowed; BB = Base on Balls; IBB = Intentional base on balls; SO = Strikeouts; HBP = Times hit by a pitch; BK = Balks; WP = Wild pitches; BF = Batters faced

Player	W	L	W-L%	ERA	G	GS	GF	CG	SHO	SV	IP	HA	RA	ER	HRA	BB	IBB	SO	HBP	BK	WP	BF
Don Drysdale	19	**17**	.528	2.63	42	**42**	0	17	3	0	**315.1**	**287**	**114**	**92**	**25**	57	13	251	**10**	0	4	**1266**
Sandy Koufax	**25**	5	.833	**1.88**	40	40	0	**20**	**11**	0	311.0	214	68	65	18	58	7	**306**	3	1	6	1210
Johnny Podres	14	12	.538	3.54	37	34	3	10	5	1	198.1	196	91	78	16	64	13	134	3	**4**	5	845
Nick Willhite	2	3	.400	3.79	8	8	0	1	1	0	38.0	44	19	16	5	10	2	28	0	**4**	1	165

==== Other pitchers ====
Note: W = Wins; L = Losses; W-L% = Win-Loss Percentage; ERA = Earned run average; G = Games pitched; GS = Games started; GF = Games finished; CG = Complete game; SHO = Shutouts; SV = Saves; IP = Innings pitched; HA = Hits allowed; RA = Runs allowed; ER = Earned runs allowed; HRA = Home runs allowed; BB = Base on Balls; IBB = Intentional base on balls; SO = Strikeouts; HBP = Times hit by a pitch; BK = Balks; WP = Wild pitches; BF = Batters faced

Player	W	L	W-L%	ERA	G	GS	GF	CG	SHO	SV	IP	HA	RA	ER	HRA	BB	IBB	SO	HBP	BK	WP	BF
Bob Miller	10	8	.556	2.89	42	23	10	2	0	1	187.0	171	71	60	7	**65**	9	125	3	0	**12**	781
Pete Richert	5	3	.625	4.50	20	12	1	1	0	0	78.0	80	40	39	7	28	3	54	1	1	3	336

==== Relief pitchers ====
Note: W = Wins; L = Losses; W-L% = Win-Loss Percentage; ERA = Earned run average; G = Games pitched; GS = Games started; GF = Games finished; CG = Complete game; SHO = Shutouts; SV = Saves; IP = Innings pitched; HA = Hits allowed; RA = Runs allowed; ER = Earned runs allowed; HRA = Home runs allowed; BB = Base on Balls; IBB = Intentional base on balls; SO = Strikeouts; HBP = Times hit by a pitch; BK = Balks; WP = Wild pitches; BF = Batters faced

Player	W	L	W-L%	ERA	G	GS	GF	CG	SHO	SV	IP	HA	RA	ER	HRA	BB	IBB	SO	HBP	BK	WP	BF
Ron Perranoski	16	3	**.842**	1.67	**69**	0	**47**	0	0	**21**	129.0	112	30	24	7	43	**14**	75	4	0	4	541
Larry Sherry	2	6	.250	3.73	36	3	18	0	0	3	79.2	82	43	33	8	24	4	47	4	0	3	349
Dick Calmus	3	1	.750	2.66	21	1	9	0	0	0	44.0	32	14	13	3	16	1	25	0	0	1	173
Ed Roebuck	2	4	.333	4.24	29	0	14	0	0	0	40.1	54	25	19	4	21	5	26	2	2	1	197
Ken Rowe	1	1	.500	2.93	14	0	4	0	0	1	27.2	28	16	9	2	11	3	12	1	0	2	122
Dick Scott	0	0	—	6.75	9	0	5	0	0	2	12.0	17	10	9	6	3	0	6	0	0	0	54
Jack Smith	0	0	—	7.56	4	0	1	0	0	0	8.1	10	7	7	2	2	0	5	2	0	3	39
Phil Ortega	0	0	—	18.00	1	0	0	0	0	0	1.0	2	2	2	1	0	0	1	0	0	0	5

=== Fielding ===
Note: G = Games played; GS = Games started; CG = Complete game; Inn = Innings played in field; Ch = Defensive Chances; PO = Putouts; A = Assists; E = Errors committed; DP = Double plays turned; Fld% = Fielding percentage; PB = Passed balls; WP = Wild pitches; SB = Stolen bases; CS = Caught stealing; CS% = Caught stealing percentage; PO = Pickoffs; Pos Summary = Positions played

Player	G	GS	CG	Inn	Ch	PO	A	E	DP	Fld%	PB	WP	SB	CS	CS%	PO	Pos Summary
Marv Breeding	19	8	6	94.0	37	15	21	1	0	.973							2B–SS–3B
Dick Calmus	21	1	0	44.0	7	1	6	0	0	1.000		1	1	1	50%	0	P
Doug Camilli	47	35	29	325.1	307	285	15	7	1	.977	1	6	14	3	18%	0	C
Tommy Davis	143	143	101	1265.1	287	205	67	15	10	.948							LF–3B–CF–RF
Willie Davis	153	139	127	1248.0	359	336	15	8	3	.978							CF
Don Drysdale	42	42	17	315.1	85	19	62	4	7	.953		4	11	8	42%	4	P
Ron Fairly	149	133	112	1209.2	1002	947	48	7	74	.993							1B–CF–LF–RF
Al Ferrara	11	9	8	92.1	20	18	1	1	0	.950							LF–RF
Jim Gilliam	141	137	85	1192.2	623	267	343	13	67	.979							2B–3B
Derrell Griffith	1	0	0	4.0	0	0	0	0	0								2B
Frank Howard	111	107	84	947.1	201	189	4	8	0	.960							RF–LF
Sandy Koufax	40	40	20	311.0	41	4	34	3	1	.927		6	11	1	8%	0	P
Ken McMullen	72	67	50	596.0	195	48	134	13	8	.933							3B–LF–2B
Bob Miller	42	23	2	187.0	71	15	54	2	5	.972		12	5	8	62%	0	P
Wally Moon	96	90	55	779.2	127	120	2	5	0	.961							RF–LF–CF
Dick Nen	5	0	0	16.0	22	22	0	0	0	1.000							1B
Nate Oliver	57	40	35	389.2	234	111	114	9	26	.962							2B–SS
Phil Ortega	1	0	0	1.0	0	0	0	0	0			0	0	0		0	P
Ron Perranoski	69	0	0	129.0	31	6	24	1	0	.968		4	0	0		0	P
Johnny Podres	37	34	10	198.1	35	3	32	0	1	1.000		5	7	3	30%	0	P
Pete Richert	20	12	1	78.0	11	3	8	0	0	1.000		3	5	2	29%	0	P
Ed Roebuck	29	0	0	40.1	13	1	11	1	0	.923		1	2	3	60%	0	P
John Roseboro	134	128	116	1144.1	982	908	66	8	6	.992	14	39	36	27	43%	2	C
Ken Rowe	14	0	0	27.2	9	0	6	3	1	.667		2	4	1	20%	0	P
Dick Scott	9	0	0	12.0	3	0	3	0	0	1.000		0	0	0		0	P
Larry Sherry	36	3	0	79.2	17	1	15	1	1	.941		3	1	3	75%	1	P
Bill Skowron	67	60	39	509.2	557	518	34	5	44	.991							1B–3B
Jack Smith	4	0	0	8.1	3	0	3	0	0	1.000		3	1	0	0%	0	P
Daryl Spencer	3	2	2	21.0	5	2	3	0	0	1.000							3B
Dick Tracewski	100	64	51	623.2	335	105	216	14	34	.958							SS–2B
Lee Walls	24	8	7	112.0	68	55	12	1	3	.985							1B–LF–3B–RF
Nick Willhite	8	8	1	38.0	5	1	3	1	0	.800		1	2	0	0%	1	P
Maury Wills	134	131	104	1143.1	604	197	381	26	54	.957							SS–3B
Don Zimmer	12	3	3	43.1	19	3	14	2	0	.895							3B–SS–2B

== 1963 World Series ==
=== Game 1 ===
October 2, 1963, at Yankee Stadium in New York

Team	1	2	3	4	5	6	7	8	9	R	H	E
Los Angeles (N)	0	4	1	0	0	0	0	0	0	5	9	0
New York (A)	0	0	0	0	0	0	0	2	0	2	6	0
W: Sandy Koufax (1–0) L: Whitey Ford (0–1)
HR: LAD – John Roseboro (1) NYY – Tom Tresh (1)

=== Game 2 ===
October 3, 1963, at Yankee Stadium in New York

Team	1	2	3	4	5	6	7	8	9	R	H	E
Los Angeles (N)	2	0	0	1	0	0	0	1	0	4	10	1
New York (A)	0	0	0	0	0	0	0	0	1	1	7	0
W: Johnny Podres (1–0) L: Al Downing (0–1) S: Ron Perranoski (1)
HR: LAD – Bill Skowron (1)

=== Game 3 ===
October 5, 1963, at Dodger Stadium in Los Angeles

Team	1	2	3	4	5	6	7	8	9	R	H	E
New York (A)	0	0	0	0	0	0	0	0	0	0	3	0
Los Angeles (N)	1	0	0	0	0	0	0	0	x	1	4	1
W: Don Drysdale (1–0) L: Jim Bouton (0–1)

=== Game 4 ===
October 6, 1963, at Dodger Stadium in Los Angeles

Team	1	2	3	4	5	6	7	8	9	R	H	E
New York (A)	0	0	0	0	0	0	1	0	0	1	6	1
Los Angeles (N)	0	0	0	0	1	0	1	0	0	2	2	1
W: Sandy Koufax (2–0) L: Whitey Ford (0–2)
HR: NYY – Mickey Mantle (1) LAD – Frank Howard (1)

== Awards and honors ==
Hall of Famer Sandy Koufax

- National League Most Valuable Player
  - Sandy Koufax
- National League Cy Young Award
  - Sandy Koufax
- World Series Most Valuable Player
  - Sandy Koufax
- Associated Press Athlete of the Year
  - Sandy Koufax

=== All-Stars ===
- 1963 Major League Baseball All-Star Game
  - Tommy Davis starter
  - Don Drysdale reserve
  - Sandy Koufax reserve
  - Maury Wills reserve

=== Sporting News ===
- TSN Major League Manager of the Year Award
  - Walter Alston
- TSN Pitcher of the Year Award
  - Sandy Koufax
- TSN Major League Player of the Year Award
  - Sandy Koufax
- TSN National League All-Star
  - Tommy Davis
  - Sandy Koufax
  - Jim Gilliam

== Farm system ==
Level	Team	League	Manager
AAA	Spokane Indians	Pacific Coast League	Danny Ozark
AA	Albuquerque Dukes	Texas League	Clay Bryant
A	Great Falls Electrics	Pioneer League	Al Ronning
A	Salem Dodgers	Northwest League	Stan Wasiak
A	Salisbury Dodgers	Western Carolinas League	George Scherger
A	Santa Barbara Rancheros	California League	James B. Williams
A	St. Petersburg Saints	Florida State League	Roy Hartsfield
