= Battle of Candlestick =

Infamous baseball brawl between the San Francisco Giants and Los Angeles Dodgers

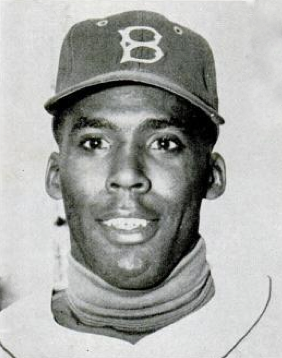
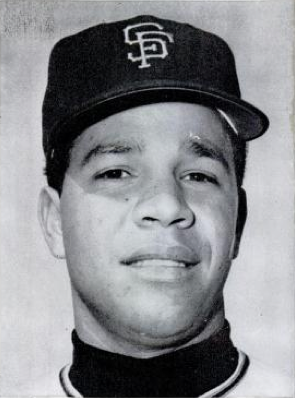
- John Roseboro (left) and Juan Marichal (right)
Los Angeles Dodgers	San Francisco Giants
3	4
	1	2	3	4	5	6	7	8	9	R	H	E
Los Angeles Dodgers	1	1	0	0	0	0	0	0	1	3	8	2
San Francisco Giants	0	1	3	0	0	0	0	0	-	4	4	1
- Date: August 22, 1965
- Venue: Candlestick Park
- City: San Francisco, California, U.S.
- Managers: Walter Alston (Los Angeles Dodgers); Herman Franks (San Francisco Giants)
- Umpires: HP: Shag Crawford; 1B: Tony Venzon; 2B: Al Forman; 3B: Doug Harvey
- Attendance: 42,807
- Time of game: 2:18

The "Battle of Candlestick", also called the "Battle of San Francisco" or simply the "Marichal–Roseboro brawl", was a bench-clearing brawl which took place on August 22, 1965, at Candlestick Park in San Francisco, California, United States. In what is considered to be one of the most violent on-field brawls in sports history, pitcher Juan Marichal of the San Francisco Giants hit catcher John Roseboro of the Los Angeles Dodgers on the head with a bat, opening a gash on Roseboro's head and starting a fourteen-minute brawl between the teams in the middle of a heated pennant race.

The brawl had short-term and long-term consequences. Marichal's subsequent suspension likely contributed to the Giants losing the pennant race that season. He received a then-record fine, also paying a financial settlement. Due to the incident, Marichal failed to get elected on his first two ballots to the Baseball Hall of Fame. However, Roseboro and Marichal later reconciled, eventually becoming close friends. Roseboro would later lobby to get Marichal elected to the Hall of Fame, while Marichal would later become a pallbearer at Roseboro's funeral.

== Background ==
The 1965 National League pennant chase was a close and heated contest between the Dodgers and the Giants, who had shared an intense rivalry dating back to their days in New York City that carried over after their move to the West Coast. The Milwaukee Braves, Pittsburgh Pirates, and Cincinnati Reds were also involved.

Entering the August 22 game against San Francisco, Los Angeles was in first place in the National League with a 72–52 record, leading the Braves by half a game and the Giants by one and a half games. The game took place in a tense atmosphere, as emotions were raw due to previous minor altercations between the teams. Additionally, the game took place in the aftermath of the Watts riots near the home of Dodger catcher Roseboro, and during the Dominican Civil War raging in the home country of Giants pitcher Marichal.

== Incident ==
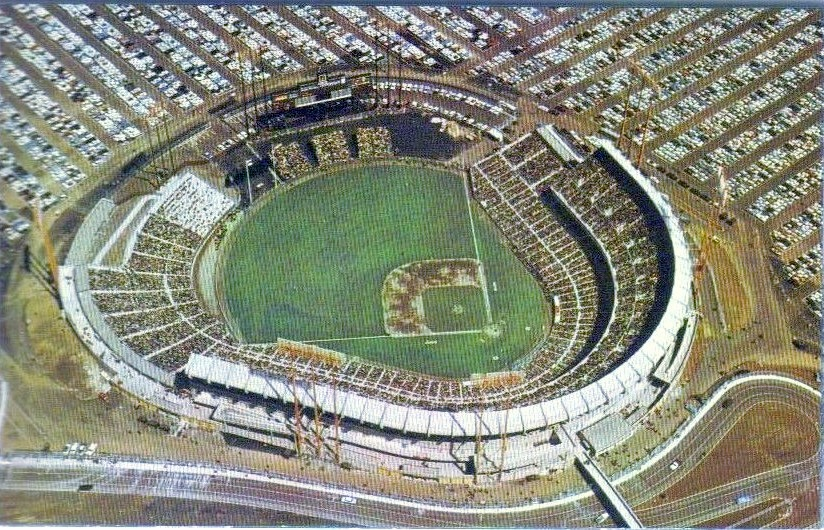
Candlestick Park, the location of the infamous brawl

The game featured a pitching matchup between two aces and future Hall of Famers: Marichal for the Giants and Sandy Koufax for the Dodgers, both favorites to win the Cy Young Award that season. It drew a sold-out crowd at San Francisco's Candlestick Park.

Los Angeles shortstop Maury Wills led off the game with a bunt single off Marichal, and eventually scored a run when Ron Fairly hit a double. Marichal, a fierce competitor, viewed the bunt as a cheap way to get on base and took umbrage with Wills. When Wills came to bat in the second inning, Marichal threw a brushback pitch at him, sending him sprawling to the ground. Willie Mays then led off the bottom of the second inning for the Giants, and Koufax threw a pitch over Mays' head as a token form of retaliation. In the top of the third inning with two outs, Marichal threw a fastball that came close to hitting Fairly, prompting him to dive to the ground. Marichal's act angered the Dodgers sitting in the dugout, and home plate umpire Shag Crawford warned both teams that any further retaliation would not be tolerated.

In the Dodgers dugout, despite the bench warnings, Koufax asked Roseboro, "Who do you want me to get?" Not wanting Koufax ejected in the middle of a crucial game, Roseboro replied, "I'll handle it." Marichal himself came up to bat in the third inning, expecting Koufax to retaliate further against him. Instead, he was startled when Roseboro's return throw to Koufax after the second pitch either brushed his ear or came close enough for him to feel the breeze off the ball. When Marichal confronted Roseboro about the proximity of his throw, Roseboro came out of his crouch with his fists clenched. Marichal afterwards stated that he thought Roseboro was about to attack him and raised his bat, striking Roseboro at least twice over the head with it, opening a two-inch gash that sent blood flowing down the catcher's face and required fourteen stitches.

Koufax raced in from the mound attempting to separate the two and was joined by the umpires, players, and coaches from both teams. A fourteen-minute brawl ensued on the field before Koufax, Mays, and other peacemakers restored order. Marichal was ejected from the game and Roseboro was taken to the clubhouse for medical treatment.

After play resumed, a shaken-up Koufax walked two batters before giving up a three-run home run to Mays. The remainder of the game went without further incident, with the Dodgers eventually losing 4–3.

== Aftermath ==
Following the game, NL president Warren Giles suspended Marichal for eight games (two starts), fined him a then-NL record $1,750 (equivalent to $18,000 in 2025) and forbade him from traveling to Dodger Stadium for the final, key two-game series of the season. Roseboro filed a lawsuit against Marichal seeking $110,000 in damages one week after the incident, but eventually settled out of court for $7,500.

Many people thought Marichal's punishment was too lenient, since it would cost him only two starts, and fans booed him for the rest of the season whenever he pitched a road game. The Giants were in a tight pennant race with the Dodgers (as well as the Pirates, Reds, and Braves) and the race was decided with only two games to play. The Giants, who ended up winning the August 22 game and were trailing by only a half-game afterward, eventually lost the pennant to the Dodgers by two games.

Ironically, the Giants went on a fourteen-game winning streak that started during Marichal's absence, and by then it was a two-team race as Pittsburgh, Cincinnati, and Milwaukee fell further behind. However, the Dodgers then won fifteen of their final sixteen games (after Marichal had returned) to win the pennant. Marichal defeated the Houston Astros 2–1 in his first game back on September 9 – the same day Koufax pitched his perfect game against the Chicago Cubs – but lost his last three decisions as the Giants slumped in the season's final week. "Marichal's actions might have cost us the pennant," Mays speculated, noting that the relief pitchers had to work more in the absence of Marichal, who usually completed his starts.

Marichal did not face the Dodgers again until a spring training game on April 3, 1966. In his first at bat against Marichal since the incident, Roseboro hit a three-run home run. Later on, Giants general manager Chub Feeney approached Dodgers general manager Buzzie Bavasi to attempt to arrange a handshake between Marichal and Roseboro. However, Roseboro declined the offer.

=== Relationship between Roseboro and Marichal ===
Years later, in his memoirs, Roseboro admitted that he was retaliating for Marichal's having thrown at Wills. In his telling, Roseboro took matters into his own hands as he did not want to risk Koufax being ejected and possibly being suspended for retaliating while the Dodgers were in the middle of a close pennant race. He stated that his throwing close to Marichal's ear was "standard operating procedure", as a form of retribution.

After years of bitterness, Roseboro and Marichal became close friends in the 1980s, getting together occasionally at old-timers' games, golf tournaments, and charity events. Dodger fans remained angry with Marichal for several years after the altercation and reacted unfavorably when the Dodgers signed him in 1975. Roseboro, who had forgiven Marichal, would personally appeal to fans to do the same.

When Marichal failed to get elected to the Baseball Hall of Fame in his first two years of eligibility, Roseboro appealed to the Baseball Writers' Association of America not to hold the incident against Marichal. Thanks in part to the appeal, Marichal was finally elected to the Hall of Fame in 1983, and would thank Roseboro during his induction speech. Marichal later recalled that Koufax approached him after his induction ceremony in order to clear up what had happened that day: "Sandy talked to me after I was inducted into the Hall of Fame. I felt so good about what he had to say. I couldn't live with that inside of me. He told me all the details about what happened. It took some of the pressure off. I really regret what happened because I used that bat. I'm not the type of person who would do that."

Roseboro later stated: "There were no hard feelings on my part and I thought if that was made public, people would believe that this was really over with. So I saw him at a Dodger old-timers' game, and we posed for pictures together, and I actually visited him in the Dominican. The next year, he was in the Hall of Fame. Hey, over the years, you learn to forget things."

When Roseboro died, Marichal served as an honorary pallbearer at his funeral. "Johnny's forgiving me was one of the best things that happened in my life," he said, at the service. "I wish I could have had John Roseboro as my catcher."
