= 1959 Major League Baseball All-Star Game (first game) =

1959 American baseball competition

	1	2	3	4	5	6	7	8	9	R	H	E
American League	0	0	0	1	0	0	0	3	0	4	8	0
National League	1	0	0	0	0	0	2	2	X	5	9	0
- Date: July 7, 1959
- Venue: Forbes Field
- City: Pittsburgh, Pennsylvania
- Managers: Casey Stengel (NYY); Fred Haney (MIL)
- Attendance: 35,277
- Ceremonial first pitch: Vice President Richard Nixon
- Television: NBC
- TV announcers: Mel Allen and Curt Gowdy
- Radio: NBC
- Radio announcers: Jack Brickhouse and Bob Prince

The 1959 Major League Baseball All-Star Game was the 26th edition of the midsummer classic between the all-stars of the American League (AL) and National League (NL), the two leagues composing Major League Baseball. The game was played on Tuesday, July 7, at Forbes Field in Pittsburgh, Pennsylvania, home of the Pittsburgh Pirates of the NL, and was a 5–4 victory for the National League. An unprecedented second game was played four weeks later in Los Angeles, California.

== Background ==
In a break from tradition, the league scheduled a "doubleheader" as part of an effort to boost the players' pension fund. The first game was held on Tuesday, July 7, at Forbes Field in Pittsburgh, Pennsylvania, the home of the Pittsburgh Pirates of the National League. The second game was on Monday, August 3, at the Los Angeles Memorial Coliseum in Los Angeles, California, the home of the Los Angeles Dodgers, also of the NL.

The first game resulted in a 5–4 victory for the NL. and the AL won the second game 5–3 for a split. The experiment of two All-Star Games continued for four seasons; the tradition of just one annual game resumed in 1963.

== Rosters ==
Players in italics have since been inducted into the National Baseball Hall of Fame.

=== American League ===
Starters
Position	Player	Team	All-Star Games
P	Early Wynn	White Sox	6
C	Gus Triandos	Orioles	3
1B	Bill Skowron	Yankees	3
2B	Nellie Fox	White Sox	9
3B	Harmon Killebrew	Senators	1
SS	Luis Aparicio	White Sox	2
OF	Rocky Colavito	Indians	1
OF	Al Kaline	Tigers	5
OF	Minnie Miñoso	Indians	6

Pitchers
Position	Player	Team	All-Star Games
P	Jim Bunning	Tigers	2
P	Bud Daley	Athletics	1
P	Ryne Duren	Yankees	2
P	Whitey Ford	Yankees	5
P	Billy Pierce	White Sox	6
P	Hoyt Wilhelm	Orioles	2

Reserves
Position	Player	Team	All-Star Games
C	Yogi Berra	Yankees	12
C	Sherm Lollar	White Sox	6
1B	Vic Power	Indians	3
1B	Roy Sievers	Senators	3
2B	Pete Runnels	Red Sox	1
3B	Frank Malzone	Red Sox	3
SS	Gil McDougald	Yankees	5
OF	Harvey Kuenn	Tigers	7
OF	Mickey Mantle	Yankees	8
OF	Ted Williams	Red Sox	16

=== National League ===
Starters
Position	Player	Team	All-Star Games
P	Don Drysdale	Dodgers	1
C	Del Crandall	Braves	6
1B	Orlando Cepeda	Giants	1
2B	Johnny Temple	Reds	3
3B	Eddie Mathews	Braves	6
SS	Ernie Banks	Cubs	5
OF	Hank Aaron	Braves	5
OF	Willie Mays	Giants	6
OF	Wally Moon	Dodgers	2

Pitchers
Position	Player	Team	All-Star Games
P	Johnny Antonelli	Giants	5
P	Lew Burdette	Braves	2
P	Gene Conley	Phillies	3
P	Don Elston-y	Cubs	1
P	Roy Face	Pirates	1
P	Vinegar Bend Mizell-x	Cardinals	1
P	Warren Spahn	Braves	11

Reserves
Position	Player	Team	All-Star Games
C	Smoky Burgess	Pirates	3
C	Hal Smith	Cardinals	2
1B	Stan Musial	Cardinals	16
1B	Frank Robinson	Reds	3
2B	Bill Mazeroski	Pirates	2
3B	Ken Boyer	Cardinals	2
SS	Dick Groat	Pirates	1
OF	Joe Cunningham	Cardinals	1
OF	Vada Pinson	Reds	1
OF	Bill White	Cardinals	1

  - -x – Injured and could not play
  - -y – Injury replacement

== Game ==
Umpires: Al Barlick, Home Plate (NL); Ed Runge, First Base (AL); Augie Donatelli, Second Base (NL); Joe Paparella, Third Base (AL); Shag Crawford, Left Field (NL); Johnny Rice, Right Field (AL)

=== Starting lineups ===
American League				National League			
Order	Player	Team	Position	Order	Player	Team	Position
1	Minnie Miñoso	Indians	LF	1	Johnny Temple	Reds	2B
2	Nellie Fox	White Sox	2B	2	Eddie Mathews	Braves	3B
3	Al Kaline	Tigers	CF	3	Hank Aaron	Braves	RF
4	Bill Skowron	Yankees	1B	4	Willie Mays	Giants	CF
5	Rocky Colavito	Indians	RF	5	Ernie Banks	Cubs	SS
6	Gus Triandos	Orioles	C	6	Orlando Cepeda	Giants	1B
7	Harmon Killebrew	Senators	3B	7	Wally Moon	Dodgers	LF
8	Luis Aparicio	White Sox	SS	8	Del Crandall	Braves	C
9	Early Wynn	White Sox	P	9	Don Drysdale	Dodgers	P

=== Game summary ===
Tuesday, July 7, 1959 1:00 pm (ET) at Forbes Field in Pittsburgh, Pennsylvania
Team	1	2	3	4	5	6	7	8	9	R	H	E
American League	0	0	0	1	0	0	0	3	0	4	8	0
National League	1	0	0	0	0	0	2	2	X	5	9	1
WP: Johnny Antonelli (1–0) LP: Whitey Ford (0–1); Home runs: AL: Al Kaline (1); NL: Eddie Mathews (2)
