= Hal R. Smith =

American baseball player (1931–2014)

Hal Smith
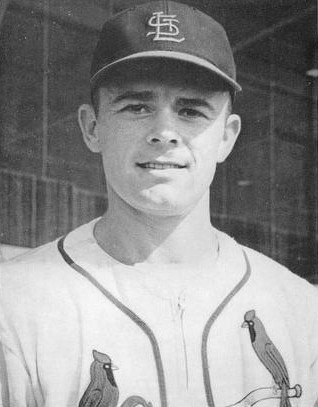
- Smith with the St. Louis Cardinals in 1957
- Catcher
- Born: June 1, 1931; Barling, Arkansas, U.S.
- Died: April 12, 2014 (aged 82); Fort Smith, Arkansas, U.S.
- Batted: Right Threw: Right

MLB debut
- May 2, 1956, for the St. Louis Cardinals

Last MLB appearance
- July 8, 1965, for the Pittsburgh Pirates

MLB statistics
- Batting average: .258
- Home runs: 23
- Runs batted in: 132
- Stats at Baseball Reference

Teams
- St. Louis Cardinals (1956–1961); Pittsburgh Pirates (1965)

Career highlights and awards
- 3× All-Star (1957, 1959, 1959²)

Harold Raymond Smith (June 1, 1931 – April 12, 2014) was an American professional baseball player, coach, scout and manager. He played in Major League Baseball as a catcher for the St. Louis Cardinals (1956–61) and Pittsburgh Pirates (1965). Born in Barling, Arkansas, Smith batted and threw right-handed; he stood 5 feet 10 1/2 inches (1.8 m) tall and weighed 186 pounds (84 kg). After Smith's playing career was curtailed by a heart ailment during the 1961 season, he became a longtime employee of the Cardinals' organization as Major League coach, minor league manager and scout. He also served as a coach for the Pirates (1965–67), Cincinnati Reds (1968–69) and Milwaukee Brewers (1976–77).

== Career ==
Smith was a standout catcher for the Cardinals during his six years with them. He was the club's regular receiver from 1956 until his forced retirement. Before the 1957 season, Cardinal manager Fred Hutchinson said "Hal Smith looks like a better catcher." He was selected a National League All-Star in 1957 and 1959. Smith led NL catchers in throwing out would-be base-stealers in both 1959 and 1960, and in caught stealing percentage in 1960.

On Opening Day (April 11), 1961, with the Cardinals trailing the Milwaukee Braves 1–0 going to the eighth inning, Smith got the team's third hit of the game against Warren Spahn, a leadoff triple. He scored on a Bob Nieman single to tie the game, and the Cardinals eventually won 2–1 after Daryl Spencer hit a home run in the 10th inning. On June 10, 1961, after starting 42 of the Cardinals' first 48 games—and shortly after he celebrated his 30th birthday—Smith complained of chest and upper abdominal pains. He was admitted to Jewish Hospital, St. Louis, where he was diagnosed with a "coronary artery condition." Smith was forced to immediately retire from playing baseball, and was the Cardinals' bullpen coach in 1962. His disability eventually cleared the way for Tim McCarver to become the Cardinals' new regular catcher.

Four years after his illness forced him to the sidelines, Smith was able to appear in four games in July 1965 for the Pirates as a player-coach on an emergency basis, when Jim Pagliaroni, Del Crandall and Ozzie Virgil were injured. Smith started one game (July 1 against the Cardinals), and was a defensive replacement in his three remaining appearances, catching for 12 total innings. He then returned to the coaching ranks on Harry Walker's staff.

In a seven-season career, Smith was a .258 hitter with 437 hits, including 63 doubles, eight triples and 23 home runs and 172 RBI in 570 games. As a catcher, he appeared in 548 games and recorded 2,810 putouts, 247 assists, and only 33 errors in 2,890 total chances for a .989 fielding percentage.

From 1956 through 1961, Smith was one of two Hal Smiths catching in Major League Baseball; the other, Harold Wayne Smith, played for the Kansas City Athletics (1956–59) and Pirates (1960–61). Since the Cardinals and Athletics were in two different leagues, the two did not play against each other until 1960, but they met for the first time in 1957 spring training.

Smith is the subject of a biography, The Barling Darling: Hal Smith In American Baseball, written by Billy D. Higgins.

In 2003, McCarver ranked Smith third on a list of the Cardinals' greatest catchers, praising the player's defensive skills. "He could really catch, with soft, pliable hands, and he could throw lasers. He was a lot like Jerry Grote on the Mets, who was the best defensive catcher I ever saw," McCarver said. "All pitchers loved Hal Smith."

== Personal life ==
Smith was good friends with teammate Vinegar Bend Mizell. Both players lived in Florissant, Missouri, and would carpool to Busch Stadium together, often with Wally Moon. Smith and Mizell both attended Florissant Valley Baptist Church, going to the early service so they could make it to Busch Stadium in time for the games. They stayed close friends after their careers had ended.

A United States Air Force veteran during the Korean War, Smith was buried at the Fort Smith National Cemetery.

== Other Appearances ==
In 2006, Hal Smith appeared as the [only] great grandfather alongside his wife, Carolyn, in the reality TV show Supernanny in The Williams Family (U.S.)

== See also ==
- List of St. Louis Cardinals coaches
