= Ken Rowe (baseball) =

American baseball player (1933–2012)

- Pitcher
- Born: December 31, 1933; Ferndale, Michigan, U.S.
- Died: November 22, 2012 (aged 78); Dallas, Georgia, U.S.
- Batted: Right Threw: Right

MLB debut
- April 14, 1963, for the Los Angeles Dodgers

Last MLB appearance
- May 4, 1965, for the Baltimore Orioles

MLB statistics
- Win–loss record: 2–1
- Earned run average: 3.57
- Strikeouts: 19
- Stats at Baseball Reference

Teams
- Los Angeles Dodgers (1963); Baltimore Orioles (1964–1965)

Career highlights and awards
- World Series champion (1963)

Kenneth Darrell Rowe (December 31, 1933 – November 22, 2012) was an American professional baseball player and coach whose career spanned 60 seasons. The native of Ferndale, Michigan, was a veteran of minor league baseball who appeared in 26 games over parts of three Major League seasons as a middle-relief pitcher for the Los Angeles Dodgers (1963) and Baltimore Orioles (1964–1965). He also spent all but two seasons of his coaching career in the minors; the exceptions came in 1985 and 1986 when he was the big-league pitching coach of the Orioles under managers Joe Altobelli and Earl Weaver.

Rowe batted and threw right-handed and was listed as 6 feet 2 inches (1.88 m) tall and 185 pounds (84 kg). He signed with his hometown Detroit Tigers in 1953 and bounced among five Detroit farm teams in the lower minors until November 1955, when he was drafted by the Dodgers, still in Brooklyn. He became a relief pitcher in 1962 with the Spokane Indians, appearing in 70 games, and then received his first MLB trial with the 1963 Dodgers. After a six-game, early season stint in Los Angeles, which netted Rowe his only MLB save (May 7 against the St. Louis Cardinals), he returned to Spokane until late July when the Dodgers recalled him. He then appeared in eight more games during the year's final three months, as the Dodgers successfully fended off the Cardinals to win the National League championship. He won his first MLB game September 26 with three innings of shutout relief against the New York Mets, but did not appear in the 1963 World Series, won by the Dodgers in a four-game sweep over the New York Yankees.

In 1964, Rowe found himself back in Spokane, where he worked in 88 games, all in relief, and posted a 16–11 record and sparkling 1.77 earned run average in 137 innings pitched. The performance impressed the Orioles, who were locked in a three-way struggle with the Yankees and Chicago White Sox for the American League pennant. They purchased Rowe's contract from Spokane September 10 and, four days later, called upon Rowe to take over for starting pitcher Milt Pappas in the ninth inning of a 3–3 tie at Memorial Stadium against the Minnesota Twins. Rowe retired the Twins in order and then was credited with the victory when the Orioles pushed across the winning run in the home half of the ninth. Rowe worked in five more games for Baltimore and was effective until his final two outings, as the Orioles finished third, only two games behind the Yankees.

He then made six early-season appearances for the 1965 Orioles before returning to the minors for the rest of his active career. In his brief MLB career, Rowe posted a 2–1 record with a 3.21 ERA and one save in 26 games pitched, including nine games finished, 19 strikeouts, 14 walks, and 45 1/3 innings. He allowed 55 hits.

His acquisition by Baltimore in late 1964 marked a long association with the Orioles, whom he served as a minor league manager, pitching coach and pitching coordinator, and MLB pitching coach through 1986. After working in the Yankees' and Philadelphia Phillies' systems, he joined the Cleveland Indians in 1991 as a minor league pitching coach, working with the Triple-A Buffalo Bisons and the Short-season Mahoning Valley Scrappers, among other assignments, for 22 seasons until his death in 2012.

== Notes ==
Preceded by Ray Miller	Baltimore Orioles pitching coach 1985–1986	Succeeded by Mark Wiley
