= 1959 Major League Baseball All-Star Game (second game) =

1959 American baseball competition

	1	2	3	4	5	6	7	8	9	R	H	E
American League	0	1	2	0	0	0	1	1	0	5	6	0
National League	1	0	0	0	1	0	1	0	0	3	6	3
- Date: August 3, 1959
- Venue: Los Angeles Memorial Coliseum
- City: Los Angeles, California
- Managers: Casey Stengel (NYY); Fred Haney (MIL)
- Attendance: 55,105
- Ceremonial first pitch: none
- Television: NBC
- TV announcers: Mel Allen and Vin Scully
- Radio: NBC
- Radio announcers: Bob Neal and Russ Hodges

The second 1959 Major League Baseball All-Star Game was the 27th edition of the midsummer classic between the all-stars of the American League (AL) and National League (NL), the two leagues composing Major League Baseball. It was played on Monday, August 3, at the Los Angeles Memorial Coliseum in Los Angeles, California, home of the Los Angeles Dodgers of the NL, and was a 5–3 victory for the American League. This was the second of two All-Star Games played in 1959, the first was on Tuesday, July 7, in Pittsburgh, Pennsylvania, also an NL city.

The first Midsummer Classic held on the West Coast, it was also the first of only two All-Star Games not played in July; the other was in 1981 following a lengthy players' strike.

== Rosters ==
Players in italics have since been inducted into the National Baseball Hall of Fame.

=== American League ===
Starters
Position	Player	Team	All-Star Games
P	Jerry Walker	Orioles	1
C	Yogi Berra	Yankees	13
1B	Pete Runnels	Red Sox	2
2B	Nellie Fox	White Sox	10
3B	Frank Malzone	Red Sox	4
SS	Luis Aparicio	White Sox	3
OF	Mickey Mantle	Yankees	9
OF	Roger Maris	Athletics	1
OF	Ted Williams	Red Sox	17

Pitchers
Position	Player	Team	All-Star Games
P	Bud Daley	Athletics	2
P	Ryne Duren	Yankees	3
P	Cal McLish	Indians	1
P	Billy O'Dell	Orioles	2
P	Camilo Pascual-x	Senators	1
P	Pedro Ramos-y	Senators	1
P	Hoyt Wilhelm	Orioles	3
P	Early Wynn	White Sox	7

Reserves
Position	Player	Team	All-Star Games
C	Elston Howard	Yankees	3
C	Sherm Lollar	White Sox	7
1B	Vic Power	Indians	4
1B	Roy Sievers	Senators	4
2B	Bobby Richardson	Yankees	2
3B	Harmon Killebrew	Senators	2
SS	Tony Kubek	Yankees	2
OF	Bob Allison	Senators	1
OF	Rocky Colavito	Indians	2
OF	Al Kaline	Tigers	6
OF	Minnie Miñoso	Indians	7
OF	Gene Woodling	Orioles	1

=== National League ===
Starters
Position	Player	Team	All-Star Games
P	Don Drysdale	Dodgers	2
C	Del Crandall	Braves	7
1B	Stan Musial	Cardinals	17
2B	Johnny Temple	Reds	4
3B	Ken Boyer	Cardinals	3
SS	Ernie Banks	Cubs	6
OF	Hank Aaron	Braves	6
OF	Willie Mays	Giants	7
OF	Wally Moon	Dodgers	3

Pitchers
Position	Player	Team	All-Star Games
P	Johnny Antonelli	Giants	6
P	Lew Burdette	Braves	3
P	Gene Conley	Phillies	4
P	Don Elston	Cubs	2
P	Roy Face	Pirates	2
P	Sam Jones	Giants	2
P	Vinegar Bend Mizell-x	Cardinals	2
P	Warren Spahn	Braves	12

Reserves
Position	Player	Team	All-Star Games
C	Smoky Burgess	Pirates	4
C	Hal Smith	Cardinals	3
1B	Orlando Cepeda	Giants	2
1B	Frank Robinson	Reds	4
2B	Bill Mazeroski	Pirates	3
3B	Eddie Mathews	Braves	7
SS	Dick Groat	Pirates	2
SS	Johnny Logan	Braves	4
SS	Charlie Neal	Dodgers	1
OF	Joe Cunningham	Cardinals	2
OF	Jim Gilliam	Dodgers	2
OF	Vada Pinson	Reds	2

  - -x – Injured and could not play
  - -y – Injury replacement

== Game ==
Umpires: Bill Jackowski, Home Plate (NL); Charlie Berry, First Base (AL); Tony Venzon, Second Base (NL); Bill Summers Third Base (AL); Ken Burkhart, Left Field (NL); Hank Soar, Right Field (AL)

=== Starting lineups ===
American League				National League			
Order	Player	Team	Position	Order	Player	Team	Position
1	Pete Runnels	Red Sox	1B	1	Johnny Temple	Reds	2B
2	Nellie Fox	White Sox	2B	2	Ken Boyer	Cardinals	3B
3	Ted Williams	Red Sox	LF	3	Hank Aaron	Braves	RF
4	Yogi Berra	Yankees	C	4	Willie Mays	Giants	CF
5	Mickey Mantle	Yankees	CF	5	Ernie Banks	Cubs	SS
6	Roger Maris	Athletics	RF	6	Stan Musial	Cardinals	1B
7	Frank Malzone	Red Sox	3B	7	Wally Moon	Dodgers	LF
8	Luis Aparicio	White Sox	SS	8	Del Crandall	Braves	C
9	Jerry Walker	Orioles	P	9	Don Drysdale	Dodgers	P

=== Game summary ===
Monday, August 3, 1959 4:00 pm (PT) at Los Angeles Memorial Coliseum in Los Angeles, California
Team	1	2	3	4	5	6	7	8	9	R	H	E
American League	0	1	2	0	0	0	1	1	0	5	6	0
National League	1	0	0	0	1	0	1	0	0	3	6	3
WP: Jerry Walker (1–0) LP: Don Drysdale (0–1); Home runs: AL: Frank Malzone (1), Yogi Berra (1), Rocky Colavito (1); NL: Frank Robinson (1), Jim Gilliam (1)
