= Marv Breeding =

American baseball player (1934–2006)

- Topps baseball card, 1961 Series #321.
- Second baseman
- Born: March 8, 1934; Decatur, Alabama, U.S.
- Died: December 31, 2006 (aged 72); Decatur, Alabama, U.S.
- Batted: Right Threw: Right

MLB debut
- April 19, 1960, for the Baltimore Orioles

Last MLB appearance
- September 29, 1963, for the Los Angeles Dodgers

MLB statistics
- Batting average: .250
- Home runs: 7
- Runs batted in: 92
- Stats at Baseball Reference

Teams
- Baltimore Orioles (1960–1962); Washington Senators (1963); Los Angeles Dodgers (1963)

Marv Eugene Breeding (March 8, 1934 – December 31, 2006) was an American professional baseball second baseman who played four seasons in Major League Baseball (MLB) for the Baltimore Orioles, Washington Senators and Los Angeles Dodgers between 1960 and 1963. He batted and threw right-handed and was listed as 6 feet (1.8 m) tall and 175 pounds (79 kg).

Breeding graduated from Decatur High School in his native city, and played for the baseball team at Samford University. His slick fielding abilities and a quick bat prompted him to sign with the Baltimore Orioles in 1955.

Breeding reached the major leagues in 1960 with the Orioles, spending three years with them before moving to the Washington Senators and Los Angeles Dodgers. His most productive season came in 1960 as the regular second baseman for Baltimore, when he posted career-highs in batting average (.267), home runs (3), runs (69), RBI (43), hits (147), doubles (25), stolen bases (10) and games played (152), including seven three-hits games. His 117 singles ranked him ninth in the American League.

Before the 1963 season Breeding was sent to the new Washington Senators in a five-players deal, playing at third and second bases. Then, in the midseason he was traded to the Dodgers. While in Los Angeles, Breeding served as a backup for injured Jim Gilliam (2B) and Maury Wills (SS). He sat the bench as a member of the Dodgers in their four-game sweep over the New York Yankees during the 1963 World Series.

In a four-season majors career, Breeding was a .250 hitter with seven home runs and 92 RBI in 415 games. After 1963, he played in the minor leagues for five more seasons at the Triple-A level.

Following his baseball retirement in 1968, Breeding worked as a manufacturer's representative and eventually started Marve Breeding Enterprises, which included M&B Industries machine shop in Decatur. In February 2006, he was selected to the Samford Baseball Hall of Fame.

Breeding died in his home at the age of 72.
