= Joe Paparella =

American baseball umpire (1909-1994)

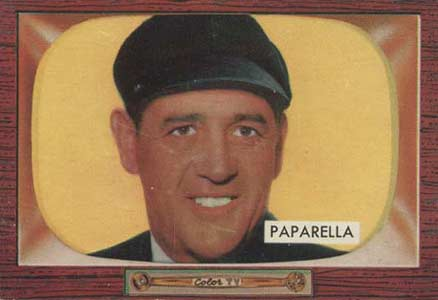
- Paparella's 1955 baseball card
- Born: Joseph James Paparella; March 9, 1909; Eynon, Pennsylvania, US
- Died: October 17, 1994 (aged 85); Sebastian, Florida, US
- Resting place: St. Francis Church Cemetery, (Eynon, Pennsylvania)
- Occupation: Umpire
- Years active: 1946–1965
- Employer: American League

Joseph James Paparella (March 9, 1909 – October 17, 1994) was an American professional baseball umpire who worked in the American League from 1946 to 1965. Paparella umpired 3,142 major league games in his 20-year career. He umpired in four World Series (1948, 1951, 1957 and 1963) and four All-Star Games (1948, 1954, 1959 and 1964).
