= Cal McLish =

American baseball player (1925–2010)

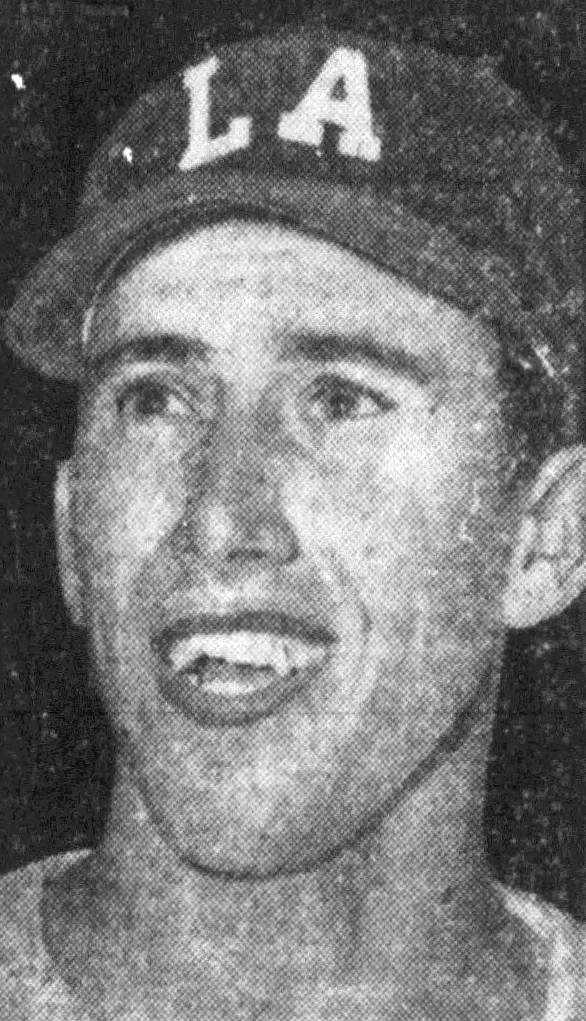
- McLish, circa 1954
- Pitcher
- Born: December 1, 1925; Anadarko, Oklahoma, U.S.
- Died: August 26, 2010 (aged 84); Edmond, Oklahoma, U.S.
- Batted: Switch Threw: Right

MLB debut
- May 13, 1944, for the Brooklyn Dodgers

Last MLB appearance
- July 14, 1964, for the Philadelphia Phillies

MLB statistics
- Win–loss record: 92–92
- Earned run average: 4.01
- Strikeouts: 713
- Stats at Baseball Reference

Teams
- As player: Brooklyn Dodgers (1944, 1946); Pittsburgh Pirates (1947–1948); Chicago Cubs (1949, 1951); Cleveland Indians (1956–1959); Cincinnati Reds (1960); Chicago White Sox (1961); Philadelphia Phillies (1962–1964); As coach: Philadelphia Phillies (1965–1966); Montreal Expos (1969–1975); Milwaukee Brewers (1976–1982)

Career highlights and awards
- All-Star (1959²)

Calvin Coolidge Julius Caesar Tuskahoma McLish (December 1, 1925 – August 26, 2010), nicknamed "Bus", was an American professional baseball pitcher and coach, who played in Major League Baseball (MLB) between 1944 and 1964 for seven different teams including four seasons with the Cleveland Indians and three seasons with the Philadelphia Phillies. He was a switch hitter and threw right-handed. In a 15-season major-league career, McLish posted a 92–92 win–loss record, with 713 strikeouts, and a 4.01 earned run average (ERA), in 1,609 innings pitched. His coaching career spanned 1965 to 1982.

== Background ==
McLish was born in Anadarko, Oklahoma, on December 1, 1925. McLish's parents were John E. and Lula McLish. His father is listed as "Choctaw by Blood" with a blood quantum of 1/8th on the Dawes Rolls. He was the seventh of eight children. He was named for Calvin Coolidge, Julius Caesar, and Tuskahoma, Oklahoma. He stated that the origin of his lengthy name is that his father was given permission to name the newborn, after not getting to name his previous six children, and he took full advantage of the opportunity. He was raised in Oklahoma City, and went to its Central High School.

== Playing career ==
McLish signed with the Brooklyn Dodgers before the 1944 season. He made his Major League Baseball debut with the Dodgers that year, the first time he played organized baseball. He spent 1945 in the United States Army, and was deployed in the Western Front of World War II. He returned to baseball in 1946, playing for the Dodgers.

On May 3, 1947, the Dodgers traded McLish, Hank Behrman, Kirby Higbe, Dixie Howell, and Gene Mauch to the Pittsburgh Pirates for Al Gionfriddo and $100,000 ($1,441,878 in current dollar terms). In addition to pitching for Pittsburgh in 1948, he also pitched for the Indianapolis Indians of the Class AAA American Association (AA). With McLish, the Indians won the AA pennant. After the 1948 season, the Pirates traded McLish and Frankie Gustine to the Chicago Cubs for Cliff Chambers and Clyde McCullough. He played in the minor leagues for the Los Angeles Angels of the Class AAA Pacific Coast League (PCL) in 1949.

McLish won 20 games for the Angels during the 1950 season. The Cubs sold McLish to the San Diego Padres, also in the PCL, in 1955. In 1956, McLish returned to MLB, pitching for the Cleveland Indians. He had a 16-8 win–loss record for Cleveland during the 1958 season, with a 2.99 earned run average (ERA). In the 1958 and 1959 seasons, McLish set a major league record with 16 consecutive wins in road games. This was later surpassed by Greg Maddux. In 1959, McLish had a 19–8 win–loss record with a 3.62 earned run average. He appeared in the 1959 MLB All-Star Game, earning the save for the American League. Despite having a chance for his 20th win, Indians management asked McLish to forgo his final start of the season so that Herb Score could pitch, as he returned from injury.

After the 1959 season, the Indians traded McLish with Gordy Coleman and Billy Martin to the Cincinnati Redlegs for Johnny Temple. Disappointed by the trade, McLish said that Indians' general manager Frank Lane "never did like me". McLish played for the Redlegs in 1960. After the season, they traded McLish and Juan Pizarro to the Chicago White Sox for Gene Freese. Before the 1962 season, the White Sox sent McLish to the Philadelphia Phillies when Andy Carey, who they had traded to Philadelphia, refused to report. Carey instead went to the Dodgers, and McLish was sent to the Phillies. In 1963, McLish had a 13–11 win–loss record in 211 innings pitched, the most on the team. He suffered from an injured shoulder the next season, and the Phillies released McLish in July 1964.

McLish also pitched for the Leones del Caracas of the Venezuelan Professional Baseball League, posting a 14–12 record with a 2.69 ERA and 147 strikeouts in parts of two seasons spanning 1953–1956. He also helped himself with the bat, hitting .358 (54-for-151) with three home runs and 14 runs batted in, being used occasionally as a pinch hitter.

== Coaching and scouting career ==
After his playing career, McLish became a major league pitching coach for the Phillies, under Mauch, the Phillies' manager. He coached for the Phillies in 1965 and 1966, and then spent the next two years scouting for the Phillies. He then followed Mauch to the expansion Montreal Expos in 1969, where he served as pitching coach and developed pitchers Bill Stoneman, Carl Morton, Steve Renko, and Ernie McAnally. He was ill in 1973 with bronchial pneumonia, and team doctors sent him home to recuperate.

The Expos fired Mauch and McLish after the 1975 season. He was soon thereafter hired to coach the Milwaukee Brewers. He coached the Brewers from 1976 through 1982. He then served as a scout for the Brewers. He worked in professional baseball through 2005, when he was an instructor for the Seattle Mariners.

== Personal life ==
McLish was inducted to the Oklahoma Sports Hall of Fame in 2009.

McLish and his wife, Ruth, were married for 60 years. He had a daughter, three sons, and thirteen grandchildren. McLish died of leukemia at his home in Edmond, Oklahoma.

== See also ==
- List of baseball players who went directly to Major League Baseball

Sporting positions
Preceded by Al Widmar	Philadelphia Phillies pitching coach 1965–1966	Succeeded by Larry Shepard
Preceded by Franchise created	Montreal Expos pitching coach 1969–1975	Succeeded by Larry Bearnarth
Preceded by Ken McBride	Milwaukee Brewers pitching coach 1976–1982	Succeeded by Pat Dobson
