= Don Elston =

American baseball player (1929–1995)

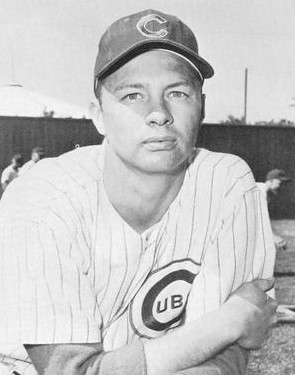
- Pitcher
- Born: April 6, 1929; Campbellstown, Ohio, U.S.
- Died: January 2, 1995 (aged 65); Arlington Heights, Illinois, U.S.
- Batted: Right Threw: Right

MLB debut
- September 17, 1953, for the Chicago Cubs

Last MLB appearance
- October 2, 1964, for the Chicago Cubs

MLB statistics
- Win–loss record: 49–54
- Earned run average: 3.69
- Strikeouts: 519
- Saves: 64
- Stats at Baseball Reference

Teams
- Chicago Cubs (1953); Brooklyn Dodgers (1957); Chicago Cubs (1957–1964)

Career highlights and awards
- 2× All-Star (1959, 1959²)

Donald Ray Elston (April 6, 1929 – January 2, 1995) was an American relief pitcher who appeared in 450 games in Major League Baseball, all but one of them as a member of the Chicago Cubs (1953, 1957–1964). Elston batted and threw right-handed, stood 6 feet (1.8 m) tall and weighed 165 pounds (75 kg). He was born in Campbellstown, Ohio, and attended Camden High School. His 18-season professional baseball career began in the Cub farm system in 1948.

A hard thrower, Elston played for perennially weak Cubs teams over the course of his nine-year major league tenure. After a brief late-season trial with the 1953 Cubs, when he was treated rudely by the Philadelphia Phillies and St. Louis Cardinals, he was sent back to the minor leagues for the next two campaigns. Chicago included him in a December 1955 trade with the defending world champion Brooklyn Dodgers that was headlined by veterans Randy Jackson, Don Hoak, Russ Meyer and Walt Moryn, but Elston remained in the minors for all of 1956. He made the Dodgers' 1957 early-season roster and worked in one game. throwing one inning of shutout relief on May 5 against the Milwaukee Braves. He was traded back to the Cubs 18 days later for pitchers Jackie Collum and Vito Valentinetti.

The Cubs first used him as a swingman: in 1957, after his re-acquisition, he began as a reliever, then, beginning June 30, he made 14 appearances as a starter through September 13. But on September 18, he moved back to the bullpen, where he would spend the rest of his career. Elston became one of the best relief pitchers in the National League. He led the league with 69 games pitched in 1958, setting a club mark. Then, in 1959, he tied teammate Bill Henry for the league lead in appearances, with 65. That season, Elston won a career-high ten games and was selected to the 1959 National League All-Star team. He came on in the ninth inning of the first of 1959's two All-Star tilts and earned a save to preserve a 5–4 victory over the American League at Forbes Field, Pittsburgh, on July 7. His 14 saves in 1959, third in the league, also was a career high. He was one of the Senior Circuit's top five relief pitchers for five straight years in saves (1957–1961) and games pitched (1958–1962). He posted sub-3.00 earned run averages in 1958, 1962 and 1963.

In 450 career MLB games, Elston compiled a 49–54 won–lost record with a 3.69 ERA and 64 saves. In 7552/3 innings pitched, he allowed 702 hits and 327 bases on balls. He struck out 519. During his brief career as a starting pitcher, he registered two complete games.

In 1995, Elston died in Arlington Heights, Illinois, at the age of 65.
