= Dick Scott (left-handed pitcher) =

American baseball player (1933–2020)

- Pitcher
- Born: March 15, 1933; Portsmouth, New Hampshire, U.S.
- Died: February 10, 2020 (aged 86); Carrollton, Georgia, U.S.
- Batted: Right Threw: Left

MLB debut
- May 8, 1963, for the Los Angeles Dodgers

Last MLB appearance
- July 10, 1964, for the Chicago Cubs

MLB statistics
- Win–loss record: 0–0
- Earned run average: 8.27
- Strikeouts: 7
- Stats at Baseball Reference

Teams
- Los Angeles Dodgers (1963); Chicago Cubs (1964)

Richard Lewis Scott (March 15, 1933 – February 10, 2020) was an American professional baseball pitcher who appeared in 12 games, all in relief, in Major League Baseball for the Los Angeles Dodgers and Chicago Cubs in 1963–1964. Scott threw left-handed, batted right-handed, and was listed as 6 feet 2 inches (1.88 m) tall and 185 pounds (84 kg). Born in Portsmouth, New Hampshire, he attended Robert William Traip Academy in nearby Kittery, Maine.

== Career ==
Scott signed as an amateur free agent with the Brooklyn Dodgers on August 18, 1953, but entered the United States Army afterward and did not make his professional baseball debut until 1956. He spent seven full campaigns in the Dodger farm system until receiving his first MLB opportunity at age 30 on May 8, 1963. Called into a game at Busch Stadium with Los Angeles leading the St. Louis Cardinals 10–5 in the eighth inning, Scott threw two scoreless frames and was credited with a save. A rough outing against the Cardinals one day later inflated his earned run average to 13.50, and he would appear in only nine total games as a Dodger, the last on July 21. He also spent part of 1963 at Triple-A Spokane.

On December 13, 1963, Los Angeles traded Scott to the Chicago Cubs in exchange for veteran southpaw relief pitcher Jim Brewer and catcher Cuno Barragan. It was a shrewd deal for the Dodgers: Brewer would pitch for them into 1975 as a key member of their bullpen. Scott, meanwhile, appeared in only three midsummer 1964 games for the Cubs, spent most of the season at Triple-A Salt Lake City, and left baseball at the end of the campaign.

In his 12 MLB games, Scott did not record a decision but earned two saves. He permitted 27 hits, four bases on balls, and 15 earned runs in 161/3 innings pitched, with seven strikeouts. His career ERA was 8.27.

A longtime resident of Thomasville, Georgia, Scott died February 10, 2020, at age 86 in Carrollton, Georgia.
