= Al Forman =

American baseball umpire (1928–2013)

- Born: Allen Sanford Forman; July 7, 1928; Morristown, New Jersey, U.S.
- Died: November 23, 2013 (aged 85); Norfolk, Virginia, U.S.
- Occupation: Umpire
- Years active: 1961–1965 (NL), 1978–1979 (AL)
- Employer(s): National League, American League

Allen Sanford Forman (July 7, 1928 – November 23, 2013) was an American professional baseball umpire. Forman worked in the National League from 1961 to 1965. He also served as a replacement umpire in the American League in 1978 and 1979 for a total of four games. Forman umpired 778 major league games in his seven-year career. He also umpired in the 1962 MLB All-Star Game.

== Early life ==
Forman served as a parachute rigger in the Navy and was stationed in Norfolk. While in the military, Forman umpired his first baseball game. Upon his discharge in 1954, he attended Fairleigh Dickinson University for two years and then completed the Al Somers Umpire School in 1956.

== Umpiring career ==
Forman umpired in the Florida State League, Northwest League, Texas League and International League before his major league promotion. He worked in the National League from 1961 through 1965. League officials elected not to renew Forman's contract for the 1966 season, saying simply that "we thought someone else could do a better job."

For brief work stoppages in 1978 and 1979, Forman was a fill-in umpire. In his only game in 1978, he ejected Oakland's Dave Revering after Revering threw a helmet while disputing a call. Forman umpired three games in 1979. By this time, Forman's umpiring work was in the Eastern College Athletic Conference and he worked full-time in sales for a distillery.

== Notable games ==
Forman was the second base umpire for the Dodgers-Giants game on August 22, 1965, when Juan Marichal struck John Roseboro with a baseball bat. Forman had been behind the plate two days prior, when Marichal said that he was threatened by Roseboro. Marichal claimed that Forman had overheard the threatening statements.

== Later life ==
As of 2010, Forman was still involved with baseball, evaluating umpires in the Coastal Plain League. He died in 2013.
