= Roy Gleason =

American baseball player (born 1943)

- Pinch hitter/Pinch runner
- Born: April 9, 1943 (age 83); Melrose Park, Illinois
- Batted: Switch Threw: Left

MLB debut
- September 3, 1963, for the Los Angeles Dodgers

Last MLB appearance
- September 28, 1963, for the Los Angeles Dodgers

MLB statistics
- Batting average: 1.000
- Home runs: 0
- Runs scored: 3
- Stats at Baseball Reference

Teams
- Los Angeles Dodgers (1963)

Roy William Gleason (born April 9, 1943) is an American former professional baseball player who appeared in eight games in Major League Baseball for the Los Angeles Dodgers late in the 1963 season. An outfielder by trade, he was a switch hitter who threw right-handed. He was listed as 6 feet 5 inches (1.96 m) tall and 220 pounds (100 kg).

Gleason was born in Melrose Park, Illinois, but grew up in Garden Grove, California, in Orange County.

He signed with the Los Angeles Dodgers in June 1961. In 1963, after spending the minor-league campaign with Class A Salem of the Northwest League, he was recalled by the Dodgers in September when rosters expanded to 40 players. In his eight games, Gleason was used primarily as a pinch runner, although he had one official at bat on September 28, 1963. In the eighth inning of a game against the Philadelphia Phillies at Dodger Stadium, pinch hitting for pitcher Phil Ortega, Gleason, batting right-handed, hit a double down the left-field line against left-hander Dennis Bennett and eventually scored a run. The Dodgers won the 1963 World Series, earning him a World Series ring, but that ring was eventually lost during his time in Vietnam.

In 1967, he was drafted into the United States Army and later served in the Vietnam War with the 9th Infantry Division (Old Reliables) and earned a Purple Heart when he was wounded by enemy forces while on patrol. He achieved the rank of sergeant and was also entitled to wear the Combat Infantryman Badge.

After his return from Vietnam, he again played in the Dodgers' farm system in 1969 and 1970, although his war injuries had impaired his baseball skills, so he never made it back to the major leagues.

In September 2003, he was invited to throw out the first pitch before a Dodgers game to commemorate the 40th anniversary of his only career plate appearance where he was stopped by Vin Scully while walking off the field and presented with a new 1963 World Series championship ring by the Dodgers to replace the one he lost in Vietnam.

He became a car salesman, married twice, and had two sons.

Gleason remains the only US combat veteran and former Major League Baseball player to receive "Special Congressional Recognition" for being awarded a Purple Heart, a World Series Ring, and holding a "perfect" lifetime Major League batting average. He also remains the only professional baseball player who, after first playing in the major leagues, was drafted into the US Army and sent to the front lines in the Vietnam War.

== TV and movie career ==
Gleason appeared in the TV series Branded, alongside Chuck Connors, and as "Gotham 100" race car driver Grimaldi Smith in the Batman episode "Come Back, Shame" [S2, E25, series episode 59].

Gleason was considered for the lead role in the film Doubles Brigade.
