= Dick Calmus =

American baseball player (born 1944)

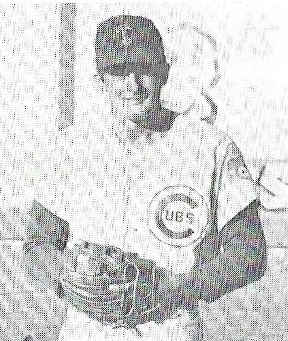
- Pitcher
- Born: January 7, 1944 (age 82); Los Angeles, California, U.S.
- Batted: Right Threw: Right

MLB debut
- April 22, 1963, for the Los Angeles Dodgers

Last MLB appearance
- September 2, 1967, for the Chicago Cubs

MLB statistics
- Win–loss record: 3-1
- Earned run average: 3.17
- Strikeouts: 26
- Stats at Baseball Reference

Teams
- Los Angeles Dodgers (1963); Chicago Cubs (1967)

Richard Lee Calmus (born January 7, 1944) is an American former pitcher in Major League Baseball. He attended Webster High School in Tulsa, Oklahoma, where he was the Tulsa World's Oklahoma basketball player of the year in 1962. He played baseball on the same high school team as fellow future major leaguer Carl Morton and won two state titles.

Signed as a "bonus baby" by the Los Angeles Dodgers (and thus required to stay on the major league roster for his first season), he posted a 3–1 record and 2.66 ERA in 1963 but then developed arm trouble in the minor leagues. He was later traded to the Chicago Cubs, he never won another game in the majors.

He is the uncle of Rocky Calmus, who played in the NFL after winning the Butkus Award in 2001 as a linebacker for the University of Oklahoma.
