= Al Ferrara =

American baseball player (1939–2024)

- Outfielder
- Born: December 22, 1939; Brooklyn, New York, U.S.
- Died: November 15, 2024 (aged 84)
- Batted: Right Threw: Right

MLB debut
- July 30, 1963, for the Los Angeles Dodgers

Last MLB appearance
- September 1, 1971, for the Cincinnati Reds

MLB statistics
- Batting average: .259
- Home runs: 51
- Runs batted in: 198
- Stats at Baseball Reference

Teams
- Los Angeles Dodgers (1963, 1965–1968); San Diego Padres (1969–1971); Cincinnati Reds (1971)

Career highlights and awards
- World Series champion (1963)

Alfred John Ferrara Jr. (December 22, 1939 – November 15, 2024), nicknamed "the Bull", was an American Major League Baseball outfielder who played from 1963 to 1971.

== Early life ==
Alfred Ferrara Jr. was born on December 22, 1939, in Brooklyn, New York, to Al Ferrara Sr. and his wife Adele. Al Sr. was a New York City fireman for 20 years who later was an air conditioning technician for Chase Bank before working the gate at Jackie Gleason's Inverrary Country Club in Florida in his retirement. Adele Ferrara, a homemaker, died when Al Jr. was 17, leaving her mother, Assunta Paulucci, in charge of Al and his twin siblings Frank and Theodora, who were 12 at the time.

As a youth he was also an accomplished piano player. "I never wanted to play the piano, I wanted to play baseball," Ferrara said. "But a first-generation Italian woman like my grandmother didn't know anything about baseball, so I had to play the piano, starting at age eight. I learned the classics. Mr. Morvillo insisted that I read music and play the pieces as they were written by Beethoven and Bach. I got pretty good and I learned to use piano to do what I wanted to do. I had a deal with my grandmother that after playing for an hour she would give me a quarter to go to the Bat Away at Coney Island. In those days you could hit about 25 balls for a quarter. After a while I got a reputation as a pretty good hitter and men would come around when I was hitting and put more quarters in the machine so I could hit for maybe a half-hour. Finally, I got my grandmother to agree that if I were to become Mr. Morvillo's number one student I could give up piano and play baseball. He would have showcase recitals at Carnegie Hall, and the number one student would play last. When I was 16, I went on last as the number one student, kissed my grandmother, and never touched the piano again." Ferrara attended Lafayette High School (New York City) where he was a high school classmate of Bob Aspromonte and played sandlot baseball with Joe Torre and Joe Pepitone. The summer of 1957 was a turning point for Ferrara. He did well enough for the amateur traveling team Dodger Rookies that Dodgers' scout Buck Lai, who was also the athletic director at Long Island University, arranged for Ferrara to get a baseball scholarship to LIU. After a successful season there, he signed a $9,000 bonus contract with the Los Angeles Dodgers in 1958.

== Major league career ==
Ferrara made his major league debut at age 23 on July 23, 1963, in a 5–1 Dodgers' loss to the New York Mets at Dodger Stadium. His first hit was in his third game, off Dick Ellsworth. His first homer the next day, off Bob Buhl, was one of three hit by the Dodgers in the fifth inning of a 5–4 loss to the Cubs.

He did not play in the 1963 World Series. He came up again in 1965 for 41 games but again saw no action in the 1965 World Series.

In 1966, he had one of his best seasons. He played in 63 games with 129 plate appearances, hitting .270, and playing in the 1966 World Series, in which he had one hit in one at bat, a pinch-hit single in the ninth inning of Game 4 off of Dave McNally.

In 1967 he had his most productive season to-date. In 384 plate appearances, he hit 16 home runs (a career high) with 50 runs batted in and a .277 average. He was voted Dodger of the Year. "I was young, fun and wacky, and I had L.A. in my hands," he said. Ferrara appeared on episodes of Gilligan’s Island and Batman through connections with fans in show business and through former teammate Lee Walls, who had become a talent agent. "That all came from being a player. I wasn't willing to put in the effort to pursue a real acting career."

He played in only two games in 1968. In the Dodgers' second game of the season, he was chasing down a line drive to the outfield by the Mets' Tommie Agee when he caught a spike in a sprinkler and broke his ankle, ending his season and his Dodgers' career.

He was picked by the San Diego Padres in the 1969 expansion draft, becoming one of the original Padres in 1969. In 1969, he hit .260 with 14 home runs and 56 RBIs, and followed that up with another good season in 1970, hitting .277 with 13 home runs and 51 RBIs.

Ferrara had a notable effort in a 2-1 loss to Tom Seaver and the Mets on April 22, 1970. Ferrara hit a 2nd inning home run to account for the Padres lone run. However, Seaver fanned 19 Padres, tying a record at the time (since broken). Seaver's performance included getting the last 10 batters in a row. Ferrara served as both the first and last victim of the streak, striking out swinging to end the game.

In 1971, after playing 17 games with the Padres, he was traded to the Cincinnati Reds, appearing in 32 games almost exclusively as a pinch-hitter. His final major league game was on September 1, 1971.

== After baseball ==
In 1974 Ferrara appeared as a contestant on Match Game '74, listing his profession as a "freelance piano buyer." Ferrara played to a zero-zero tie against defending champion Marlena Crews; Ferrara lost the game in a tiebreaker match.

After leaving baseball, he spent four years as a greeter at the Martoni Marquis on Sunset Strip in Los Angeles before going into sales for various home-improvement companies, eventually starting his own company, Major League Construction. That work lasted 30 years; Ferrara sold his business and retired in 2005 at age 65. Then, the recession of 2008 occurred and Ferrara lost about a quarter of his retirement savings. “Going back into sales or getting a job would have been rough at my age, so I decided to go back home . . . and called the Dodgers.”

The Dodgers put Ferrara to work in their community relations department in July 2009. He visited elementary schools and read Dr. Seuss books to the kids; he cautioned teens about the evils of alcohol, tobacco and drugs; and he entertained guests at some Dodger home games. He at one point lived with Kay Donno, who by 2013 was his companion of over 35 years.

Ferrara was previously married twice, once at age 20 and again at age 30. He had a son, Al Ferrara III of West Islip, New York, a daughter-in-law Maureen, and two grandchildren, Alfred IV and Samantha.

Ferrara died from pneumonia on November 15, 2024, at the age of 84.
