= Shag Crawford =

American baseball umpire (1916-2007)

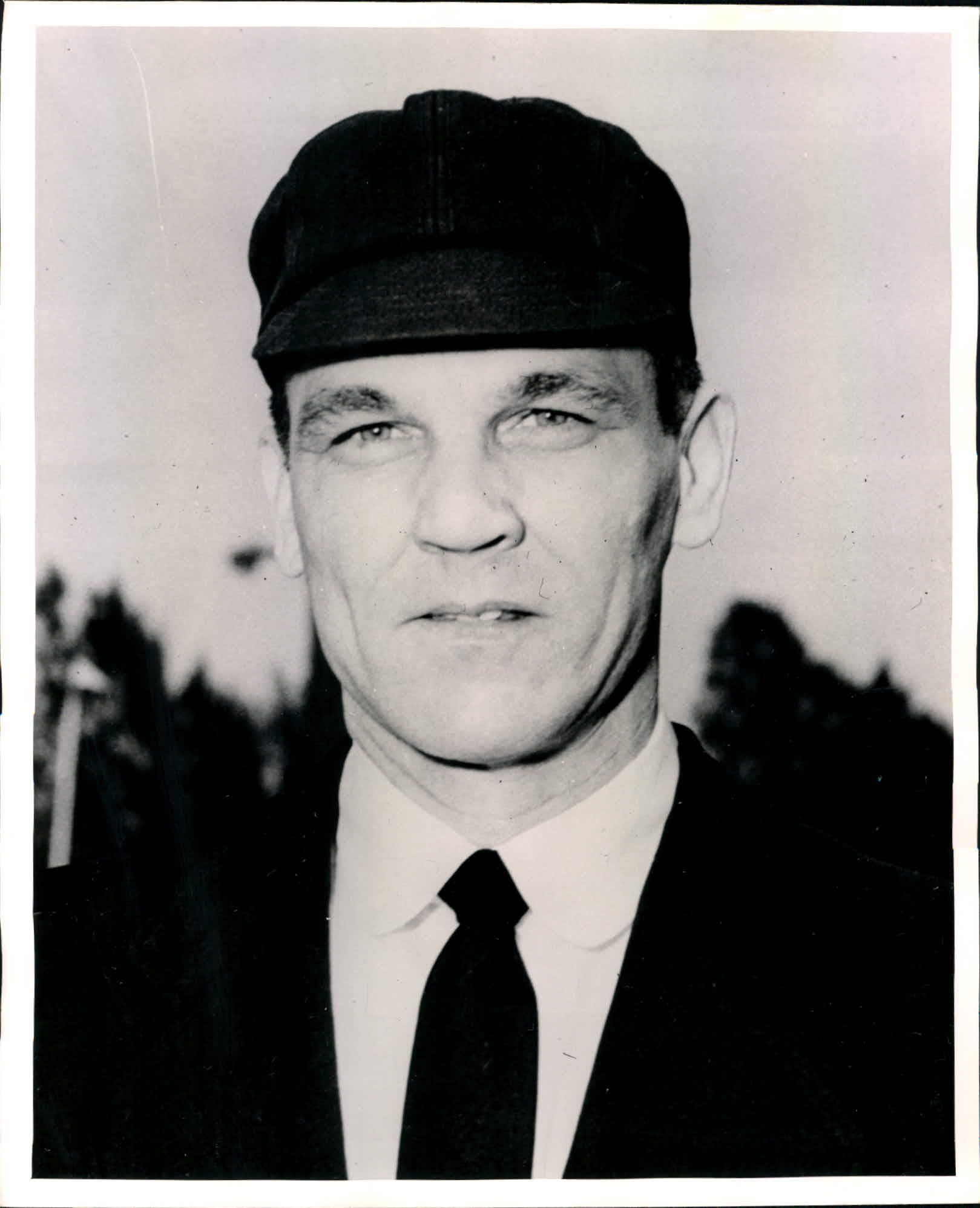
- Born: August 30, 1916; Philadelphia, Pennsylvania, U.S.
- Died: July 11, 2007 (aged 90); Glen Mills, Pennsylvania, U.S.
- Occupation: MLB umpire
- Years active: 1956–1975
- Spouse: Vivian Gallagher (m. 1940)
- Children: 4

Henry Charles "Shag" Crawford (August 30, 1916 – July 11, 2007) was an American professional umpire in Major League Baseball who worked in the National League from 1956 to 1975. During his twenty seasons in the National League, Crawford worked more than 3,100 games and as a home plate umpire was notable for getting in a low crouch and resting his hands on the back of the catcher in front of him. Crawford wore number 2 after the National League adopted numbers for its umpires, which was then transferred to his son Jerry Crawford, who wore it from 1976 until his 2010 retirement.

== Early life ==
Crawford was born in Philadelphia, Pennsylvania in the Overbrook section. Originally given the nickname of Shaggy, it was shortened to Shag as he got older. Other boys in the neighborhood earned similar nicknames such as "Doc" "Sheik" "Whitey" and "Shadow". Growing up, he played baseball and football and was involved in boxing, and later played in the minor leagues as a catcher in the Philadelphia Phillies' system. Crawford married Vivian Gallagher on November 2, 1940, and they had three sons and a daughter, residing in Havertown, Pennsylvania.

He served in the United States Navy during World War II, and was on the destroyer USS Walke (DD-723) when its bridge was struck by a Japanese kamikaze on January 6, 1945, during the invasion of Luzon, in which commanding officer George Fleming Davis suffered fatal injuries and was awarded the Medal of Honor.

== Baseball career ==
Crawford became a minor league umpire in 1950, working for two months in the Canadian–American League before moving to the Eastern League from 1951 to 1953 and the American Association from 1954 to 1955; his contract was purchased by the National League in November 1955.

Crawford was the third base umpire for Sandy Koufax's third no-hitter on June 4, 1964.

=== Marichal-Roseboro bat incident ===
He was the home plate umpire when one of the most violent brawls in baseball history occurred during a game between the Los Angeles Dodgers and the San Francisco Giants at Candlestick Park on August 22, 1965. The incident occurred between Giants pitcher Juan Marichal and Dodgers catcher John Roseboro in the aftermath of the Watts riots near Roseboro's Los Angeles home and while the Dominican Civil War raged in Marichal's home country so emotions were raw. The Dodgers' Maury Wills led off the game with a bunt single off Giants pitcher Marichal and eventually scored a run. Marichal, a fierce competitor, viewed the bunt as a cheap way to get on base and took umbrage with Wills. When Wills came up to bat in the second inning, Marichal threw a pitch directly at Wills sending him sprawling to the ground. Willie Mays then led off the bottom of the second inning for the Giants and Dodgers' pitcher Sandy Koufax threw a pitch over Mays' head as a token form of retaliation. In the top of the third inning with two outs, Marichal threw a fastball that came close to hitting Ron Fairly, prompting him to dive to the ground. Marichal's act angered the Dodgers sitting in the dugout and, Crawford then warned both teams that any further retaliations would not be tolerated. When Marichal came to bat in the third inning, he was expecting Koufax to take further retaliation against him but instead, he was startled when Roseboro's return throw to Koufax after the second pitch either brushed his ear or came close enough for him to feel the breeze off the ball. When Marichal confronted Roseboro about the closeness of his throw, Roseboro came out of his crouch with his fists clenched. Marichal stated afterwards that he thought Roseboro was about to attack him and raised his bat, striking Roseboro at least twice over the head with his bat, opening a two-inch gash that sent blood flowing down the catcher's face that required 14 stitches. Koufax ran in from the mound to attempt to separate them and was joined by the umpires, players and coaches from both teams. Crawford attempted to step between the two players in an effort to defuse the situation. When Marichal stumbled, Crawford saw his opportunity and wrapped both of his arms around Marichal and the two men fell to the ground. A 14-minute brawl ensued on the field before Koufax, Giants captain Willie Mays and other peacemakers restored order. Crawford ejected Marichal from the game and afterwards, National League president Warren Giles suspended Marichal for eight games (two starts), fined him a then-NL record US$1,750 (equivalent to $17,879 in 2025), and also forbade him from traveling to Dodger Stadium for the final, crucial two-game series of the season. Roseboro filed a $110,000 damage suit against Marichal one week after the incident but, eventually settled out of court for $7,500.

=== Other incidents ===
Crawford was also the umpire during a game between the Cubs and Cardinals on September 22, 1974. Crawford told the Cardinals’ Al Hrabosky to pitch while Chicago's manager and two of his players attempted to argue with Crawford. The Cubs in question then entered the batter's box in anger and were nearly struck by a pitch, and a brawl commenced.

During Crawford's career, he officiated three World Series (1961, 1963, 1969), ejecting Baltimore manager Earl Weaver in Game 4 of the 1969 Series for arguing balls and strikes, the first managerial ejection in World Series competition since 1935. Crawford also worked two National League Championship Series (1971, 1974) and All-Star Games in 1959 (first game), 1961 (first game), and 1968, working behind the plate for the latter game.

=== Career end ===
Crawford was relieved of his duties in 1975 for refusing to work the World Series that year in protest of a rotational system implemented for selection of World Series umpires, over the traditional assignment by merit.

Two of Crawford's sons, Jerry Crawford and Joey Crawford, also became sports officials. Jerry was a National League umpire from 1976 until 2010, and Joey was a National Basketball Association referee from 1977 to 2016. Shag Crawford worked the first game at Philadelphia's Veterans Stadium in 1971 and stood with Jerry at home plate when the lineup cards were presented before the final game at the ballpark in 2003.

== See also ==
- List of Major League Baseball umpires (disambiguation)
