= John Rice (umpire) =

American baseball umpire (1918-2011)

- Born: April 27, 1918; Homestead, Pennsylvania, U.S.
- Died: January 1, 2011 (aged 92); Chicago, Illinois, U.S.
- Occupation: Former MLB umpire
- Years active: 1955–1973
- Height: 5 ft 10 in (178 cm)

John LaClaire Rice (April 27, 1918 – January 1, 2011) was an American umpire in Major League Baseball who worked in the American League for nineteen seasons. Rice umpired in three All-Star Games and four World Series.

== Early life ==
Rice was born in Homestead, Pennsylvania. He played semi-professional baseball in Chicago before joining the United States Marine Corps during World War II, serving from 1942 to 1943 in Guadalcanal and Peleliu.

== Umpiring career ==
Following his honorable military discharge, Rice began his umpiring career in the Illinois State League in 1948. He later worked in the Middle Atlantic League (1949), California League (1950), Western League (1951–1952) and in the American Association (1953–1954).

Rice umpired in the American League from 1955 through 1973, appearing in three All-Star Games and four World Series, including the 1959 Chicago White Sox bid.

Rice was behind the plate in Game 3 of the 1971 World Series when Bob Robertson of the Pittsburgh Pirates hit a three-run home run off Baltimore Orioles 20-game winner Mike Cuellar after missing a bunt sign. The home run proved to be a turning point as Pittsburgh rallied from down 2 games to 0 to win Game 3 and the World Series in seven games.

In the decisive fifth of the 1972 American League Championship Series, Rice, umpiring at first base, made a controversial call in the top of the fourth inning that was hotly disputed by the Detroit Tigers. George Hendrick of the Oakland A's was called safe on a play where the ball clearly beat him to first base, but Rice ruled that first baseman Norm Cash's foot had come off the bag. Hendrick ended up scoring the game-winning run that sent Oakland to the World Series.

During the off-season, Rice worked in the Cook County Recorders Office and with the Metropolitan Water Reclamation District.

Rice also served as President of the Pitch and Hit Club and the Old Timers Baseball Association of Chicago.

Rice was a guest on the TV program What's My Line? on June 23, 1957.

== Later life ==
Rice was inducted into the Chicago Sports Hall of Fame in 1999. He died in Chicago at the age of 92.

== See also ==
- List of Major League Baseball umpires (disambiguation)
