= Tony Venzon =

American baseball umpire (1915–1971)

- Born: Antonio Venzon; June 4, 1915; Thurber, Texas, U.S.
- Died: September 20, 1971 (aged 56); Pittsburgh, Pennsylvania, U.S.
- Occupation: Umpire
- Years active: 1957–1971
- Employer: National League
- Spouse: Kay Phillips

Anthony Venzon (June 4, 1915 – September 20, 1971) was an American professional baseball umpire who worked in the National League (NL) from 1957 to 1971. Venzon umpired 2,226 major league games. He umpired in three World Series and three All-Star Games.

== Biography ==
Anthony Venzon was born in Thurber, Texas on June 4, 1915. His family later relocated to Pennsylvania and he attended Muhlenberg College. Venzon played in the minor leagues from 1937 to 1940 as an outfielder. He served in World War II and then umpired minor league baseball for seven seasons before being called up to the NL in 1957. NL veteran umpire Artie Gore was dismissed to make room for Venzon and Ken Burkhart.

Venzon umpired 2,226 games between 1957 and 1971. He worked as home plate umpire during four MLB no-hit games between 1960 and 1970. He umpired in the 1963, 1965 and 1970 World Series. He also called the 1959, 1962, and 1969 All-Star Games.

Venzon was home plate umpire when Dock Ellis of the Pittsburgh Pirates threw a no-hitter vs. the San Diego Padres in the first game of a June 12, 1970 doubleheader. Ellis claimed to be under the influence of the psychedelic drug LSD while pitching.

Venzon died in September 1971 after open heart surgery in Pennsylvania. He had been out of baseball with health problems since that April.

== See also ==
- List of Major League Baseball umpires (disambiguation)
