= Wally Moon =

American baseball player (1930–2018)

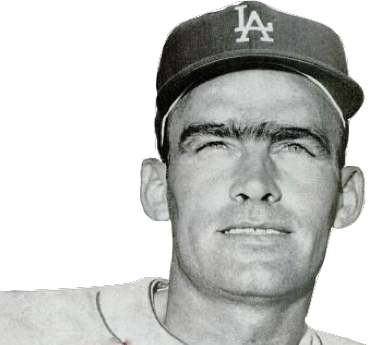
- Moon in 1961
- Outfielder
- Born: April 3, 1930; Bay, Arkansas, U.S.
- Died: February 9, 2018 (aged 87); Bryan, Texas, U.S.
- Batted: Left Threw: Right

MLB debut
- April 13, 1954, for the St. Louis Cardinals

Last MLB appearance
- September 12, 1965, for the Los Angeles Dodgers

MLB statistics
- Batting average: .289
- Home runs: 142
- Runs batted in: 661
- Stats at Baseball Reference

Teams
- St. Louis Cardinals (1954–1958); Los Angeles Dodgers (1959–1965)

Career highlights and awards
- 3× All-Star (1957, 1959, 1959²); 3× World Series champion (1959, 1963, 1965); NL Rookie of the Year (1954); Gold Glove Award (1960)

Wallace Wade Moon (April 3, 1930 – February 9, 2018) was an American professional baseball outfielder in Major League Baseball. Moon played his 12-year career in the major leagues for the St. Louis Cardinals (1954–1958) and Los Angeles Dodgers (1959–1965). He batted left-handed and threw right-handed.

Moon was the 1954 National League Rookie of the Year. He was an All-Star for two seasons and a Gold Glove winner one season. Moon batted .295 or more for seven seasons. He led the National League in triples in 1959 and in fielding percentage as a left fielder in 1960 and 1961.

Moon was a three-time World Series champion with the Los Angeles Dodgers in 1959, 1963, and 1965.

== Youth ==
Moon was named after Wallace Wade, a former college football coach at the University of Alabama and Duke University. From a family of educators, he earned a master's degree in administrative education from Texas A&M University in College Station while he was still in the minor leagues. He coached from 1953 to 1954 at Lake City, also in Craighead County, Arkansas.

== Major league career ==
In the spring of 1954, the Cardinals told Moon to report to their minor league spring training camp. He ignored the order and reported instead to St. Petersburg with the Cardinals. He said that he would make the team or quit baseball. They let him stay, and by the end of the spring training he replaced Enos Slaughter in the outfield. To make room for him on the roster, St. Louis sent Slaughter to the New York Yankees.

Moon made his major league debut on April 13, 1954. In his first at-bat, despite chants of "We want Slaughter", he belted a home run against the Chicago Cubs. Moon finished his rookie season with a .304 batting average, 12 home runs, 76 runs batted in, and career-high numbers in runs (106), hits (193), doubles (29), and stolen bases (18) in 151 games. He earned both the MLB Rookie of the Year and The Sporting News Rookie of the Year honors. Earning 17 out of 24 first-place votes, Moon won easily over Ernie Banks, Gene Conley and Hank Aaron.

A fine left fielder with a good arm, Moon also played right field and center as well as first base. He hit a career-high 24 homers in 1957, and made the All-Star team in 1957 and 1959 (two games were played). Twice in his career, Moon compiled double figures in doubles, triples, home runs and stolen bases: 22, 11, 16, 12 in 1956, and 26, 11, 19, 15 in 1959, his first year with the Dodgers.

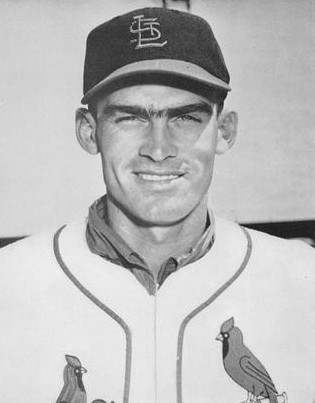
Moon in 1957

After the 1958 season, the Cardinals traded Moon to the Dodgers for outfielder Gino Cimoli. Both players were coming off years when they batted below .250; the Cardinals also sent pitcher Phil Paine, who never played for the Dodgers. Moon was initially concerned about batting in the converted Los Angeles Memorial Coliseum because right field was 440 feet (130 m) away, making it difficult for a left-handed batter. However, the left field seats were only 251 feet (77 m) away, protected by a 42-foot-high (13 m) screen. After consulting with friend and mentor Stan Musial, Moon adjusted his batting stance to emphasize hitting to left. The results were very successful. In his first season with the Dodgers, the team won the World Championship. Moon provided support in the lineup for Duke Snider, Gil Hodges and Don Demeter. He gained quick public acclaim in 1959 for the "Moon shots" that he hit over the high left field screen. Moon hit a home run in the sixth and final game of that World Series, which the Dodgers won over the Chicago White Sox. He also caught Luis Aparicio's fly ball for the final out of the Series.

Moon was a Gold Glove Award winner for left field in 1960 leading National League left fielders in assists, double plays, and fielding percentage. He had another good season in 1961, batting .328 with 17 home runs and 88 runs batted in while leading National League left fielders in fielding percentage.

A career .289 hitter, Moon hit 142 home runs with 661 runs batted in during 1457 games, with a .371 on-base percentage and a .445 slugging average for a combined .816 on-base plus slugging percentage. His career fielding percentage at all three outfield positions and first base was .980. He also scored the last run ever in the Coliseum. He retired as a player after the 1965 season.

== Post-playing career ==
In 1969, Moon was a batting coach for the San Diego Padres, joining manager Preston Gómez and pitching coach and former teammate Roger Craig.

In the mid-70s Moon was an instructor at the Sho-Me baseball camp owned by the Kansas City Royals, located in Branson, Missouri.

Moon went on to become athletic director and baseball coach at John Brown University, and a coach and minor league manager and owner of the San Antonio Dodgers for four years beginning in the late 1970s.

Moon managed the minor-league Frederick Keys, a Carolina League affiliate of the Baltimore Orioles, in 1990 and 1991.

Moon moved to Bryan, Texas, where he lived for over 25 years. He retired in 1998. He was married to Bettye and had five children and seven grandchildren.

Moon is featured on many websites featuring baseball cards, as he sported a prominent unibrow.

The January 27, 1960, episode ("The Larry Hanify Story") of the popular TV western Wagon Train featured Moon in a brief role. The end credits included: "And Introducing Wally Moon as Sheriff Bender." There was no baseball tie-in with his character, but the sheriff was hit by a bullet during a shoot-out with Tommy Sands' bad guy.

Moon died on February 9, 2018, at the age of 87.

== See also ==
- Home run in first Major League at-bat
- List of Gold Glove Award winners at outfield
- MLB Rookie of the Year Award
- Sporting News Rookie of the Year Award
- List of Major League Baseball annual triples leaders
