= Ed Bailey =

American baseball player (1931–2007)

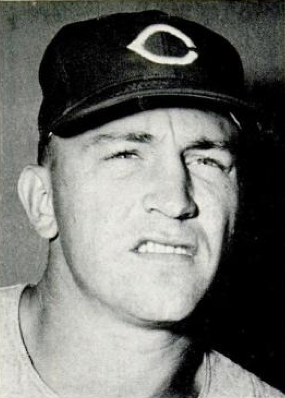
- Bailey in 1956
- Catcher
- Born: April 15, 1931; Strawberry Plains, Tennessee, U.S.
- Died: March 23, 2007 (aged 75); Knoxville, Tennessee, U.S.
- Batted: Left Threw: Right

MLB debut
- September 26, 1953, for the Cincinnati Redlegs

Last MLB appearance
- April 26, 1966, for the California Angels

MLB statistics
- Batting average: .256
- Home runs: 155
- Runs batted in: 540
- Stats at Baseball Reference

Teams
- Cincinnati Redlegs / Reds (1953–1961); San Francisco Giants (1961–1963); Milwaukee Braves (1964); San Francisco Giants (1965); Chicago Cubs (1965); California Angels (1966)

Career highlights and awards
- 6× All-Star (1956, 1957, 1960, 1960², 1961², 1963)

Lonas Edgar Bailey, Jr. (April 15, 1931 – March 23, 2007) was an American professional baseball player and later served on the Knoxville, Tennessee city council. He played as a catcher in Major League Baseball from 1953 through 1966. A six-time All-Star, Bailey was one of the top catchers in the National League in the late 1950s and early 1960s.

Born in Strawberry Plains in Jefferson County, Tennessee, Bailey batted left-handed, threw right-handed and was listed as 6 feet 2 inches (1.88 m) tall and 205 pounds (93 kg). A younger brother, Jim, was a left-handed pitcher who had a brief big-league trial as Ed's teammate on the 1959 Cincinnati Reds.

== Major League career ==
Ed Bailey signed with the Reds in 1950 as an amateur free agent. He reached the Majors in 1953 and in 1955 he was given a chance as the Redlegs' (the Cincinnati team's nickname from 1953 to 1958) starting catcher, replacing Andy Seminick. When his offensive production floundered, the Redlegs traded Seminick for catcher Smoky Burgess and Bailey was sent down to the San Diego Padres of the Pacific Coast League. With the help of some batting advice from Redlegs manager and former catcher Birdie Tebbetts, his hitting improved in the minor leagues and continued to improve in the Venezuelan Winter League.

Bailey began the 1956 season as the backup catcher to Burgess, but when the team faltered early in the season, Tebbetts decided to shake things up and named Bailey as the Redlegs' starting catcher. By mid-season, he was the leading hitter in the National League with a .335 batting average, helping to spur the Redlegs into first place. His hitting performance earned him a place as the starting catcher for the National League in the 1956 All-Star Game. The Redlegs stayed in the pennant race until the last day of the season, ending up with a 91–63 record, two games behind the Brooklyn Dodgers. Bailey ended the 1956 season with career-highs in batting average (.300), home runs (28), runs batted in (75), and led the league in baserunners caught stealing (23).

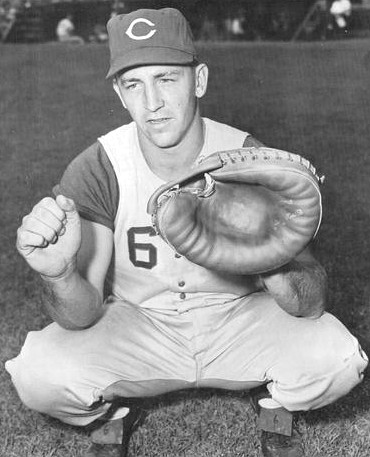
Bailey in 1961

In 1957, the Redlegs were once again in first place at mid-season, but faltered to finish the season in fourth place. Bailey earned his second consecutive start for the National League All-Star Team, led National League catchers with a 46.2 Caught Stealing percentage and finished second to Roy Campanella with a .992 fielding percentage. He remained as the Reds' starting catcher for the rest of the 1950s up until 12 games into the 1961 season, when he was traded to the San Francisco Giants for second baseman Don Blasingame and catcher Bob Schmidt.

In 1962, Bailey platooned with catcher Tom Haller, as the two players—both left-handed hitters—combined to give the Giants 35 home runs and 100 runs batted in from the catcher's position. In June of that year, Bailey had a streak of 3 clutch home runs in four games that propelled the Giants into first place. The Giants battled the Los Angeles Dodgers in a tight pennant race as the two teams ended the season tied for first place and met in the 1962 National League tie-breaker series. The Giants won the three-game series to clinch the National League championship. Bailey appeared in six games of the 1962 World Series, hitting a home run in Game 3 as the Giants lost to the New York Yankees in seven games. He had another strong year in 1963, hitting 21 home runs with 68 runs batted in, earning his fifth and final All-Star berth.

In December 1963, Bailey was traded along with Felipe Alou and Billy Hoeft to the Milwaukee Braves for Del Crandall, Bob Hendley and Bob Shaw. He served as Joe Torre's back up for two seasons with the Braves before being traded back to the Giants in February 1965. After just fourteen games of the 1965 season, he was traded again, this time to the Chicago Cubs, where he served as a backup catcher to Vic Roznovsky. On July 22, 1965, Bailey hit a grand slam home run, a three-run home run and a run-scoring single to drive home eight runs during a game against the Philadelphia Phillies. After the 1965 season, he was traded to the California Angels and was released after appearing in only five games of the 1966 season.

== Career statistics ==
In a fourteen-season major league career, Bailey played in 1,212 games with 915 hits in 3,581 at bats for a .256 batting average along with 155 home runs and 540 runs batted in, including 423 runs, a .355 on-base percentage and a .986 fielding percentage. He was a six-time All-Star and led National League catchers in baserunners caught stealing and caught stealing percentage once each. At the time of his retirement, he ranked 11th overall for career home runs by a catcher. His younger brother, pitcher Jim Bailey, also played in the Major Leagues. When his brother joined the Reds in 1959, the Bailey brothers became one of the few brother-batteries in Major League history.

In between, Bailey guided both the Lácteos de Pastora and Industriales de Valencia to Venezuela League championship titles, and later played with them in the Caribbean Series tournament in 1954 and 1956, respectively.

== 1957 All-Star Game ballot stuffing controversy ==
In 1957, Bailey and six of his Redleg teammates—Roy McMillan, Johnny Temple, Don Hoak, Gus Bell, Wally Post and Frank Robinson—were voted into the National League All-Star starting lineup, the result of a ballot stuffing campaign by Redlegs fans. Major League Baseball Commissioner Ford Frick intervened, removing Bell and Post from the starting line up and replacing them with Hank Aaron and Willie Mays. Frick allowed Bell to remain on the team as a reserve while Post was removed from the team altogether. The Commissioner also transferred the responsibility for All-Star voting to the players, managers and coaches the following year.

== On television ==
- In 1956 appeared as a Mystery Guest in a What's My Line? episode, along with Cincinnati teammates Gus Bell, Smoky Burgess, Ray Jablonski, Johnny Klippstein, Ted Kluszewski, Roy McMillan, Joe Nuxhall, Wally Post, Frank Robinson, and Johnny Temple.

== Later life ==
Bailey later served for 12 years on the Knoxville, Tennessee city council from 1983 to 1995 and, worked for United States Congressman Jimmy Duncan. He died in Knoxville in 2007, following a battle with throat cancer.

== Highlights ==
- Made the National League All-Star team in 1956–57, 1960–61, and 1963.
- Hit double figures in home runs in eight of his 14 ML seasons.
- Hit three home runs in one 1956 game.
- Had eight pinch-hit homers, including two grand slams.
- Hit a two-run homer in Game 3 of the 1962 World Series.
- Collected eight RBI in a 1965 game.
- Made two unassisted double plays in 1963 and 1965.
- Caught Juan Marichal's no-hitter on June 15, 1963.
