= Larry Jackson (baseball) =

American baseball player (1931–1990)

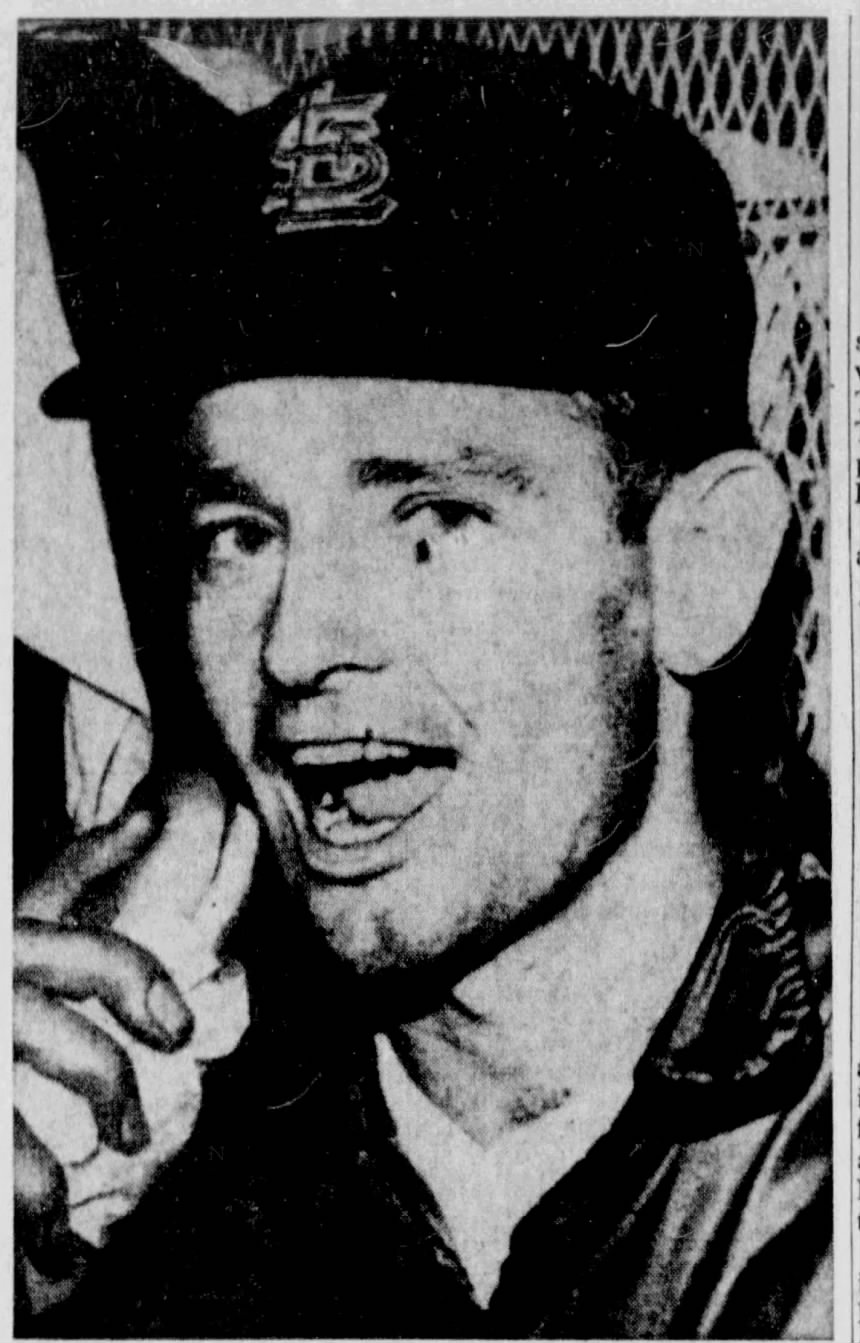
- Jackson in 1961
- Pitcher
- Born: June 2, 1931; Nampa, Idaho, U.S.
- Died: August 28, 1990 (aged 59); Boise, Idaho, U.S.
- Batted: Right Threw: Right

MLB debut
- April 17, 1955, for the St. Louis Cardinals

Last MLB appearance
- September 20, 1968, for the Philadelphia Phillies

MLB statistics
- Win–loss record: 194–183
- Earned run average: 3.40
- Strikeouts: 1,709
- Stats at Baseball Reference

Teams
- St. Louis Cardinals (1955–1962); Chicago Cubs (1963–1966); Philadelphia Phillies (1966–1968)

Career highlights and awards
- 5× All-Star (1957, 1958, 1960, 1960², 1963); MLB wins leader (1964)

Lawrence Curtis Jackson (June 2, 1931 – August 28, 1990) was an American right-handed professional baseball pitcher, who played in Major League Baseball (MLB) for the St. Louis Cardinals, Chicago Cubs, and Philadelphia Phillies from 1955 to 1968. In 1964, Jackson led the National League (NL) with 24 wins (playing for the eighth-place Cubs), and was runner-up in the Cy Young Award voting; he also led the NL in innings pitched and shutouts, once each.

Jackson's 194 career NL victories are the most in the league since 1900 by any right-hander who never played for a first-place team. A model of reliability, he won at least 13 games in each of his last 12 seasons. His 141 wins in the 1960s was sixth most among all pitchers.

He later served four terms in the Idaho Legislature.

== Early years ==
Born in Nampa, Idaho, Jackson graduated from Boise High School in 1949. He attended Boise Junior College and played both football and baseball for the Broncos; he was a junior college All-American halfback on the 1950 team that played in the Junior Rose Bowl in December.

He signed with the Cardinals in 1951 and was 3–11 with Pocatello in the Class C Pioneer League. In 1952, he led the California League with 351 strikeouts and a 28–4 record for the pennant-winning Fresno Cardinals.

== Major league career ==
He broke into the majors with St. Louis in 1955, posting a 9–14 record, and gradually worked his way into the starting rotation by 1958. He was named to the NL All-Star team in 1957, 1958, and 1960 while with the Cardinals, and allowed only two hits and no runs in 3 2/3 innings in the three appearances; the 1957 game was played at Sportsman's Park in St. Louis. In 1960 he led the NL with 282 innings and 38 games started, also winning 18 games, but he missed the first four weeks of the 1961 season after having his jaw broken in a late spring training game by a flying piece of Duke Snider's broken bat.

After the 1962 season, Jackson was traded to the Cubs along with Lindy McDaniel in a six-player deal; the Cardinals received three players including Don Cardwell. Jackson was again an All-Star in 1963, and earned the win despite it being his least effective appearance in the Midsummer Classic; after entering with a 3–1 lead in the third inning, he allowed the tying runs, but the NL again took a 4–3 lead in the top of the fifth as he departed.

He enjoyed his best season the following year; despite the Cubs' 76–86 record, Jackson was 24–11 with 148 strikeouts and a 3.14 earned run average. He also set a major league record for pitchers with 109 total chances without an error, breaking the mark of 108 shared by Three Finger Brown (1908) and Eppa Rixey (1917); Randy Jones broke his record with 112 for the San Diego Padres in 1976. With only one Cy Young Award for both leagues at that time, Dean Chance of the American League's Los Angeles Angels won the award with 17 of the 20 votes; Jackson received two votes, while Sandy Koufax of the Dodgers received one. Jackson lost 21 games in 1965, the first since Murry Dickson in 1951–52 to have twenty wins and twenty losses in consecutive seasons. One of those losses was 1–0 in ten innings to Jim Maloney of the Cincinnati Reds, who threw a no-hitter with 187 pitches.

In early 1966 he was traded to the Phillies in the deal which brought Ferguson Jenkins to Chicago, and he ended the season as one of six pitchers tied for the league shutout lead with five. In 1967, he won his 171st game to pass Bill Doak, who had previously been the winningest NL right-hander of the 20th century to never play for a pennant winner. On June 20 of that year, he pitched a one-hitter against the New York Mets.

After a 13–17 season with a 2.77 ERA in 1968, Jackson was selected by the Montreal Expos in the October 1968 expansion draft, but chose to retire rather than join the team; Bobby Wine was sent from the Phillies to the Expos the following April as compensation. In a 14-season career, Jackson posted a 194–183 (.515) record with 1,709 strikeouts, 37 shutouts, and a 3.40 ERA in 558 games and 3,262 2/3 innings. He tied a record held by Claude Passeau by four times having the most total chances among pitchers with a perfect 1.000 fielding percentage (1957, 1964, 1965, 1968).

== After baseball ==
Jackson returned to Boise and was an insurance agent and a lobbyist for Boise Cascade. He served four terms as a Republican from Ada County in the Idaho House of Representatives, became executive director of the Republican State Committee. He ran for governor in 1978, but was fourth in the six-man GOP primary in August, won by Allan Larsen, who lost the general election to incumbent John Evans. Jackson later served on the state industrial commission and the centennial commission; he died of cancer in Boise at the age of 59.

== See also ==
- List of Major League Baseball annual wins leaders
