= 1965 Pittsburgh Pirates season =

1965 Pittsburgh Pirates
- League: National League
- Ballpark: Forbes Field
- City: Pittsburgh, Pennsylvania
- Owners: John W. Galbreath (majority shareholder); Bing Crosby, Thomas P. Johnson (minority shareholders)
- General managers: Joe L. Brown
- Managers: Harry Walker
- Television: KDKA-TV; Bob Prince, Jim Woods
- Radio: KDKA; Bob Prince, Jim Woods, Don Hoak

The 1965 Pittsburgh Pirates season was the 84th season of the Pittsburgh Pirates franchise; their 79th in the National League. The Pirates finished third in the league standings with a record of 90–72.

== Regular season ==
=== Season standings ===
National League
Team	W	L	Pct.	GB	Home	Road
Los Angeles Dodgers	97	65	.599	—	50‍–‍31	47‍–‍34
San Francisco Giants	95	67	.586	2	51‍–‍30	44‍–‍37
Pittsburgh Pirates	90	72	.556	7	49‍–‍32	41‍–‍40
Cincinnati Reds	89	73	.549	8	49‍–‍32	40‍–‍41
Milwaukee Braves	86	76	.531	11	44‍–‍37	42‍–‍39
Philadelphia Phillies	85	76	.528	11½	45‍–‍35	40‍–‍41
St. Louis Cardinals	80	81	.497	16½	42‍–‍39	38‍–‍42
Chicago Cubs	72	90	.444	25	40‍–‍41	32‍–‍49
Houston Astros	65	97	.401	32	36‍–‍45	29‍–‍52
New York Mets	50	112	.309	47	29‍–‍52	21‍–‍60

=== Record vs. opponents ===
1965 National League record Sources:
Team	CHC	CIN	HOU	LAD	MIL	NYM	PHI	PIT	SF	STL
Chicago	—	7–11	8–10	8–10	9–9	11–7–1	8–10	5–13	6–12	10–8–1
Cincinnati	11–7	—	12–6	6–12	12–6	11–7	13–5	8–10	6–12	10–8
Houston	10–8	6–12	—	5–13	4–14	14–4	6–12	8–10	3–15	9–9
Los Angeles	10–8	12–6	13–5	—	10–8	12–6	9–9	9–9	10–8	12–6
Milwaukee	9–9	6–12	14–4	8–10	—	13–5	6–12	9–9	10–8	11–7
New York	7–11–1	7–11	4–14	6–12	5–13	—	7–11–1	4–14	5–13	5–13
Philadelphia	10–8	5–13	12–6	9–9	12–6	11–7–1	—	8–10	8–10	10–7
Pittsburgh	13–5	10–8	10–8	9–9	9–9	14–4	10–8	—	11–7–1	4–14
San Francisco	12–6	12–6	15–3	8–10	8–10	13–5	10–8	7–11–1	—	10–8
St. Louis	8–10–1	8–10	9–9	6–12	7–11	13–5	7–10	14–4	8–10	—

=== Game log ===
1965 Game Log: 90–72 (Home: 49–32; Away: 41–40)
April: 6–9 (Home: 4–2; Away: 2–7)

#	Date	Opponent	Score	Win	Loss	Save	Attendance	Record
1	April 12	Giants	1–0 (10)	**Veale** (1–0)	Marichal	—	28,189	1–0
2	April 13	Giants	5–2	**Friend** (1–0)	Sanford	**McBean** (1)	4,444	2–0
3	April 14	Dodgers	1–3	Osteen	**Gibbon** (0–1)	—	7,770	2–1
4	April 17	Astros	3–2 (10)	**Face** (1–0)	Owens	—	6,129	3–1
5	April 18	Astros	1–3	Bruce	**Law** (0–1)	—		3–2
6	April 18	Astros	5–4	**McBean** (1–0)	MacKenzie	—	7,176	4–2
7	April 20	@ Giants	3–1	**Friend** (2–0)	Bolin	**McBean** (2)	37,784	5–2
8	April 21	@ Giants	2–3	Marichal	**Gibbon** (0–2)	—	12,022	5–3
9	April 23	@ Astros	3–4 (12)	Giusti	**McBean** (1–1)	—	25,399	5–4
10	April 24	@ Astros	0–5	Farrell	**Law** (0–2)	—	30,736	5–5
11	April 25	@ Astros	4–5 (11)	Raymond	**Face** (1–1)	—	19,116	5–6
12	April 26	@ Astros	0–2	Giusti	**Friend** (2–1)	—	15,053	5–7
13	April 27	@ Dodgers	4–5	Reed	**Gibbon** (0–3)	Miller	17,630	5–8
14	April 28	@ Dodgers	2–0	**Veale** (2–0)	Osteen	—	17,464	6–8
15	April 30	@ Cardinals	2–3	Washburn	**Law** (0–3)	—	20,401	6–9

May: 14–15 (Home: 5–8; Away: 9–7)

#	Date	Opponent	Score	Win	Loss	Save	Attendance	Record
16	May 1	@ Cardinals	2–3	Stallard	**Cardwell** (0–1)	—	9,689	6–10
17	May 2	@ Cardinals	5–9	Gibson	**Friend** (2–2)	Taylor		6–11
18	May 2	@ Cardinals	4–5	Washburn	**McBean** (1–2)	—	23,630	6–12
19	May 4	@ Cubs	6–3	**McBean** (2–2)	Broglio	—	1,527	7–12
20	May 5	@ Cubs	1–3	Buhl	**Law** (0–4)	—	2,093	7–13
21	May 6	@ Cubs	3–5	Jackson	**Schwall** (0–1)	Abernathy	1,471	7–14
22	May 7	Reds	5–4	**Sisk** (1–0)	Craig	—	9,052	8–14
23	May 8	Reds	1–10	Maloney	**Veale** (2–1)	—	5,790	8–15
24	May 9	Reds	3–5	Arrigo	**McBean** (2–3)	McCool	6,858	8–16
25	May 11	Braves	4–3	**Cardwell** (1–1)	Blasingame	**McBean** (3)	4,694	9–16
26	May 12	Braves	4–5	Lemaster	**Butters** (0–1)	O'Dell	4,464	9–17
27	May 13	Braves	4–5	Niekro	**Schwall** (0–2)	—	4,165	9–18
28	May 14	Cardinals	7–8	Schultz	**McBean** (2–4)	Purkey	9,986	9–19
29	May 15	Cardinals	1–5	Stallard	**Law** (0–5)	—	5,148	9–20
30	May 16	Cardinals	3–6	Gibson	**Cardwell** (1–2)	—		9–21
31	May 16	Cardinals	1–5	Washburn	**Veale** (2–2)	Purkey	11,081	9–22
32	May 19	@ Reds	1–3	McCool	**Gibbon** (0–4)	—	6,743	9–23
33	May 20	@ Reds	3–11	Ellis	**Friend** (2–3)	—	5,209	9–24
34	May 21	@ Braves	6–1	**Law** (1–5)	Lemaster	**McBean** (4)	2,679	10–24
35	May 22	@ Braves	9–4	**Sisk** (2–0)	Cloninger	**McBean** (5)	2,662	11–24
36	May 23	@ Braves	10–1	**Veale** (3–2)	Sadowski	—	2,053	12–24
37	May 24	Cubs	6–4	**Schwall** (1–2)	Broglio	**McBean** (6)	5,360	13–24
38	May 25	Cubs	7–6 (12)	**Carpin** (1–0)	Warner	—	6,403	14–24
39	May 26	@ Phillies	5–3	**Sisk** (3–0)	Mahaffey	—	10,212	15–24
40	May 28	@ Mets	6–1	**Veale** (4–2)	Spahn	—	32,011	16–24
41	May 29	@ Mets	7–4	**Schwall** (2–2)	Lary	**McBean** (7)	11,297	17–24
42	May 30	@ Mets	9–1	**Friend** (3–3)	Jackson	—		18–24
43	May 30	@ Mets	12–0	**Law** (2–5)	Parsons	—	41,552	19–24
44	May 31	Phillies	5–2	**Cardwell** (2–2)	Short	**McBean** (8)	16,366	20–24

June: 19–11 (Home: 11–5; Away: 8–6)

#	Date	Opponent	Score	Win	Loss	Save	Attendance	Record
45	June 1	Phillies	4–0	**Veale** (5–2)	Mahaffey	—	10,478	21–24
46	June 3	Mets	6–8	Cisco	**Gibbon** (0–5)	Parsons	9,169	21–25
47	June 4	Mets	1–2	Fisher	**Friend** (3–4)	—	11,026	21–26
48	June 5	Mets	9–0	**Law** (3–5)	Kroll	—	6,581	22–26
49	June 6	Mets	5–3	**Cardwell** (3–2)	Jackson	—		23–26
50	June 6	Mets	3–0	**Veale** (6–2)	Spahn	—	16,387	24–26
51	June 8	Astros	7–6 (11)	**Gibbon** (1–5)	Woodeshick	—	8,084	25–26
52	June 9	Astros	11–3	**Law** (4–5)	Nottebart	—	9,412	26–26
53	June 10	Astros	4–2	**Veale** (7–2)	Bruce	—	9,839	27–26
54	June 11	Giants	5–3	**Cardwell** (4–2)	Hands	**Carpin** (1)	24,708	28–26
55	June 12	Giants	0–4	Shaw	**Friend** (3–5)	Linzy	12,213	28–27
56	June 13	Giants	2–1	**Law** (5–5)	Perry	—	20,091	29–27
57	June 14	@ Cardinals	2–5	Taylor	**Veale** (7–3)	—	5,265	29–28
58	June 15	@ Cardinals	10–6	**Carpin** (2–0)	Stallard	**McBean** (9)	10,428	30–28
59	June 16	@ Cardinals	10–9	**Schwall** (3–2)	Schultz	—	10,480	31–28
60	June 17	@ Cardinals	4–1	**Law** (6–5)	Gibson	—	11,905	32–28
61	June 18	@ Astros	1–5	Bruce	**Veale** (7–4)	—	24,286	32–29
62	June 19	@ Astros	5–3 (11)	**Gibbon** (2–5)	Nottebart	**Carpin** (2)	27,785	33–29
63	June 20	@ Giants	3–4 (15)	Herbel	**McBean** (2–5)	—		33–30
64	June 20	@ Giants	3–7	Bolin	**Schwall** (3–3)	Linzy	39,757	33–31
65	June 22	@ Giants	6–0	**Law** (7–5)	Perry	—	10,537	34–31
66	June 23	@ Giants	1–6	Herbel	**Veale** (7–5)	Linzy	8,209	34–32
67	June 24	@ Dodgers	13–3	**Cardwell** (5–2)	Drysdale	—	28,867	35–32
68	June 25	@ Dodgers	1–4	Koufax	**Friend** (3–6)	—	32,060	35–33
69	June 26	@ Dodgers	6–1	**Law** (8–5)	Osteen	—	21,769	36–33
70	June 27	@ Dodgers	10–2	**Veale** (8–5)	Podres	—	33,161	37–33
71	June 28	Reds	5–4	**Cardwell** (6–2)	O'Toole	**McBean** (10)	15,302	38–33
72	June 29	Reds	2–1 (16)	**Schwall** (4–3)	McCool	—		39–33
73	June 29	Reds	5–7	Nuxhall	**Gibbon** (2–6)	Craig	28,589	39–34
74	June 30	Cardinals	1–7	Washburn	**Law** (8–6)	Woodeshick	15,369	39–35

July: 13–18 (Home: 6–10; Away: 7–8)

#	Date	Opponent	Score	Win	Loss	Save	Attendance	Record
75	July 1	Cardinals	6–7	Woodeshick	**Gibbon** (2–7)	Sadecki	11,920	39–36
76	July 2	Braves	8–3	**Cardwell** (7–2)	Cloninger	**Schwall** (1)	12,352	40–36
77	July 3	Braves	9–5	**Friend** (4–6)	Sadowski	**Carpin** (3)	9,460	41–36
78	July 4	Braves	2–5	Fischer	**Law** (8–7)	—	16,145	41–37
79	July 5	@ Phillies	1–3	Bunning	**Veale** (8–6)	—		41–38
80	July 5	@ Phillies	2–6	Roebuck	**Wood** (0–1)	Wagner	25,330	41–39
81	July 6	@ Phillies	8–4	**Cardwell** (8–2)	Culp	—	17,357	42–39
82	July 7	@ Phillies	0–1	Short	**Friend** (4–7)	—	16,632	42–40
83	July 8	Dodgers	4–9	Reed	**Law** (8–8)	—	22,247	42–41
84	July 9	Dodgers	4–1	**Veale** (9–6)	Willhite	—	16,284	43–41
85	July 10	Dodgers	4–8	Drysdale	**Cardwell** (8–3)	Perranoski	14,880	43–42
86	July 11	Dodgers	2–4	Koufax	**Gibbon** (2–8)	—		43–43
87	July 11	Dodgers	4–3 (10)	**Carpin** (3–0)	Miller	—	37,631	44–43
88	July 15	@ Braves	6–9	Johnson	**Law** (8–9)	Osinski	5,180	44–44
89	July 16	@ Braves	2–12	Blasingame	**Veale** (9–7)	—	6,090	44–45
90	July 17	@ Braves	5–6	O'Dell	**Carpin** (3–1)	—	4,518	44–46
91	July 18	@ Reds	6–5	**Schwall** (5–3)	Craig	—		45–46
92	July 18	@ Reds	4–8	Jay	**Gibbon** (2–9)	McCool	25,637	45–47
93	July 19	@ Reds	3–1	**Law** (9–9)	Nuxhall	—	11,096	46–47
94	July 20	@ Reds	8–6	**Veale** (10–7)	Ellis	**McBean** (11)	9,669	47–47
95	July 21	Mets	0–1	Jackson	**Cardwell** (8–4)	—	22,670	47–48
96	July 23	@ Cubs	6–0	**Friend** (5–7)	Ellsworth	—	5,288	48–48
97	July 24	@ Cubs	8–5	**Law** (10–9)	Jackson	**McBean** (12)	9,578	49–48
98	July 25	@ Cubs	3–2 (13)	**Law** (11–9)	McDaniel	—		50–48
99	July 25	@ Cubs	0–5	Faul	**Cardwell** (8–5)	—	20,777	50–49
100	July 27	Phillies	1–3	Wagner	**Friend** (5–8)	Baldschun		50–50
101	July 27	Phillies	3–2 (10)	**Schwall** (6–3)	Wagner	—	21,832	51–50
102	July 28	Phillies	0–1 (14)	Baldschun	**Schwall** (6–4)	—	13,207	51–51
103	July 29	Phillies	0–5	Culp	**Veale** (10–8)	—	10,160	51–52
104	July 30	Cubs	3–1	**Cardwell** (9–5)	Broglio	—	11,382	52–52
105	July 31	Cubs	6–7	Buhl	**Sisk** (3–1)	Abernathy	7,431	52–53

August: 19–9 (Home: 10–2; Away: 9–7)

#	Date	Opponent	Score	Win	Loss	Save	Attendance	Record
106	August 1	Cubs	8–2	**McBean** (3–5)	Ellsworth	**Schwall** (2)		53–53
107	August 1	Cubs	3–1	**Gibbon** (3–9)	Jackson	**Schwall** (3)	14,741	54–53
108	August 3	@ Mets	7–0	**Law** (12–9)	Cisco	—	24,597	55–53
109	August 4	@ Mets	3–0	**Veale** (11–8)	Fisher	**Schwall** (4)	20,703	56–53
110	August 5	@ Mets	11–3	**Cardwell** (10–5)	Jackson	—	19,374	57–53
111	August 6	@ Phillies	0–4	Bunning	**Friend** (5–9)	—	22,155	57–54
112	August 7	@ Phillies	4–3	**McBean** (4–5)	Culp	—	8,204	58–54
113	August 8	@ Phillies	7–1	**Veale** (12–8)	Short	—		59–54
114	August 8	@ Phillies	2–5	Herbert	**Sisk** (3–2)	—	29,260	59–55
115	August 10	@ Giants	3–4	Marichal	**Cardwell** (10–6)	—	14,457	59–56
116	August 12	@ Giants	3–4	Linzy	**Schwall** (6–5)	—		59–57
117	August 12	@ Giants	5–2	**Law** (13–9)	Perry	—	20,435	60–57
118	August 13	@ Dodgers	1–3	Osteen	**Veale** (12–9)	—	32,551	60–58
119	August 14	@ Dodgers	0–1 (10)	Koufax	**Cardwell** (10–7)	—	29,237	60–59
120	August 15	@ Dodgers	4–2	**Sisk** (4–2)	Drysdale	**McBean** (13)	25,175	61–59
121	August 16	@ Astros	0–3	Roberts	**Friend** (5–10)	—	26,549	61–60
122	August 17	@ Astros	8–6	**Law** (14–9)	Farrell	**McBean** (14)	24,863	62–60
123	August 18	@ Astros	8–7	**Veale** (13–9)	Nottebart	**McBean** (15)	30,470	63–60
124	August 20	Braves	3–4	Blasingame	**Cardwell** (10–8)	—	18,653	63–61
125	August 21	Braves	3–0	**Friend** (6–10)	Lemaster	—	10,259	64–61
126	August 22	Braves	5–4 (11)	**Schwall** (7–5)	Osinski	—	14,112	65–61
127	August 23	Giants	6–2	**Law** (15–9)	Spahn	—	15,016	66–61
128	August 24	Giants	5–2	**Cardwell** (11–8)	Shaw	—	15,497	67–61
129	August 25	Giants	3–3			—	13,348	67–61
130	August 26	Giants	8–0	**Veale** (14–9)	Herbel	—		68–61
131	August 26	Giants	6–5	**Sisk** (5–2)	Perry	**McBean** (16)	18,893	69–61
132	August 27	Astros	10–9 (11)	**McBean** (5–5)	Cuellar	—	12,917	70–61
133	August 28	Astros	6–9	Dierker	**Schwall** (7–6)	Giusti	7,051	70–62
134	August 29	Astros	4–2	**Wood** (1–1)	Nottebart	**Gibbon** (1)	30,002	71–62

September: 16–10 (Home: 10–5; Away: 6–5)

#	Date	Opponent	Score	Win	Loss	Save	Attendance	Record
135	September 1	Dodgers	3–2 (11)	**Gibbon** (4–9)	Koufax	—		72–62
136	September 1	Dodgers	2–1	**Law** (16–9)	Drysdale	—	26,394	73–62
137	September 2	Dodgers	1–7	Osteen	**Veale** (14–10)	Perranoski	29,200	73–63
138	September 3	@ Braves	3–4	Johnson	**Cardwell** (11–9)	Osinski	5,349	73–64
139	September 4	@ Braves	3–8 (8)	Cloninger	**Friend** (6–11)	O'Dell	2,471	73–65
140	September 5	@ Braves	2–1	**Sisk** (6–2)	Sadowski	**McBean** (17)	20,409	74–65
141	September 6	@ Reds	3–1	**Veale** (15–10)	Jay	—		75–65
142	September 6	@ Reds	4–2	**McBean** (6–5)	Maloney	—	16,323	76–65
143	September 7	@ Reds	0–5	Ellis	**Cardwell** (11–10)	—	7,153	76–66
144	September 8	@ Cardinals	2–1	**Friend** (7–11)	Sadecki	—	9,714	77–66
145	September 10	Reds	7–0	**Veale** (16–10)	Jay	—	20,694	78–66
146	September 11	Reds	2–3	Maloney	**Sisk** (6–3)	—	9,570	78–67
147	September 13	Reds	8–4	**Law** (17–9)	Ellis	—	1,299	79–67
148	September 14	Cardinals	2–3	Gibson	**Friend** (7–12)	Woodeshick	8,224	79–68
149	September 15	Cardinals	3–7	Sadecki	**Veale** (16–11)	Briles	6,725	79–69
150	September 16	Cardinals	1–2	Stallard	**McBean** (6–6)	Woodeshick	4,788	79–70
151	September 17	Phillies	4–0	**Cardwell** (12–10)	Culp	—	8,987	80–70
152	September 18	Phillies	4–3	**Face** (2–1)	Steevens	—	5,313	81–70
153	September 19	Phillies	1–0 (10)	**Veale** (17–11)	Baldschun	—	10,026	82–70
154	September 20	Mets	10–0	**Sisk** (7–3)	Fisher	—	3,892	83–70
155	September 21	Mets	6–5	**Face** (3–1)	Eilers	—	4,660	84–70
156	September 22	Mets	6–2	**Friend** (8–12)	McGraw	—	4,964	85–70
157	September 25	@ Cubs	3–6	Hendley	**Veale** (17–12)	Abernathy	2,903	85–71
158	September 26	@ Cubs	5–3 (10)	**Schwall** (8–6)	Abernathy	—	2,097	86–71
159	September 28	@ Mets	0–1 (12)	Sutherland	**Face** (3–2)	—	6,995	86–72
160	September 29	@ Mets	4–2	**Schwall** (9–6)	Selma	**McBean** (18)	2,807	87–72

October: 3–0 (Home: 3–0; Away: 0–0)

#	Date	Opponent	Score	Win	Loss	Save	Attendance	Record
161	October 1	Cubs	2–1	**Face** (4–2)	Ellsworth	—	3,441	88–72
162	October 2	Cubs	3–0	**Cardwell** (13–10)	Jackson	—	3,626	89–72
163	October 3	Cubs	6–3	**Face** (5–2)	Abernathy	**McBean** (19)	26,527	90–72

Legend: = Win = Loss = Tie
Bold = Pirates team member

=== Notable transactions ===
- June 8, 1965: Tom Dettore was drafted by the Pirates in the 26th round of the 1965 Major League Baseball draft, but did not sign.
- June 20, 1965: Don Money was signed as an amateur free agent by the Pirates.
- July 6, 1965: Woodie Fryman was signed as an amateur free agent by the Pirates.

=== Roster ===
1965 Pittsburgh Pirates
**Roster**
**Pitchers**: 31 Tom Butters; 43 Don Cardwell; 20 Frank Carpin; 26 Roy Face; 19 Bob Friend; 22 Joe Gibbon; 32 Vern Law; 34 Al McBean; 29 Don Schwall; 25 Tommie Sisk; 39 Bob Veale; 31 Luke Walker; 35 Wilbur Wood	**Catchers**: 16 Del Crandall; 12 Jerry May; 10 Jim Pagliaroni; 2 Hal Smith; 28 Ozzie Virgil; **Infielders**: 14 Gene Alley; 7 Bob Bailey; 17 Donn Clendenon; 12 Gene Freese; 9 Bill Mazeroski; 11 José Pagán; 30 Andre Rodgers; 11 Dick Schofield	**Outfielders**: 21 Roberto Clemente; 24 Jerry Lynch; 15 Manny Mota; 27 Bob Oliver; 23 George Spriggs; 8 Willie Stargell; 18 Bill Virdon	**Manager**: 3 Harry Walker; **Coaches**: 5 Alex Grammas (Third base); 6 Clyde King (Pitching); 4 Johnny Pesky (First base); 2 Hal Smith (Bullpen)

== Statistics ==
Batting

Note: G = Games played; AB = At bats; H = Hits; Avg. = Batting average; HR = Home runs; RBI = Runs batted in

Regular Season
Player	G	AB	H	Avg.	HR	RBI
Jerry May	4	2	1	0.500	0	1
George Spriggs	9	2	1	0.500	0	0
Roberto Clemente	152	589	194	0.329	10	65
Donn Clendenon	162	612	184	0.301	14	96
Andre Rodgers	75	178	51	0.287	2	25
Jerry Lynch	73	121	34	0.281	5	16
Manny Mota	121	294	82	0.279	4	29
Bill Virdon	135	481	134	0.279	4	24
Willie Stargell	144	533	145	0.272	27	107
Bill Mazeroski	130	494	134	0.271	6	54
Jim Pagliaroni	134	403	108	0.268	17	65
Ozzie Virgil	39	49	13	0.265	1	5
Gene Freese	43	80	21	0.263	0	8
Bob Bailey	159	626	160	0.256	11	49
Gene Alley	153	500	126	0.252	5	47
Vern Law	34	82	20	0.244	1	6
Jose Pagan	42	38	9	0.237	0	1
Dick Schofield	31	109	25	0.229	0	6
Al McBean	62	27	6	0.222	0	2
Del Crandall	60	140	30	0.214	2	10
Don Cardwell	37	74	12	0.162	2	10
Joe Gibbon	31	26	3	0.115	0	0
Bob Veale	39	93	8	0.086	0	3
Tommie Sisk	39	33	2	0.061	0	1
Bob Friend	34	71	3	0.042	0	1
Tom Butters	5	1	0	0.000	0	0
Frank Carpin	39	1	0	0.000	0	0
Roy Face	16	1	0	0.000	0	0
Bob Oliver	3	2	0	0.000	0	0
Don Schwall	43	15	0	0.000	0	0
Hal Smith	4	3	0	0.000	0	0
Wilbur Wood	34	6	0	0.000	0	0
Luke Walker	2	0	0	—	0	0
Team totals	163	5,686	1,506	0.265	111	631

Pitching

Note: G = Games pitched; IP = Innings pitched; W = Wins; L = Losses; ERA = Earned run average; SO = Strikeouts

Regular Season
Player	G	IP	W	L	ERA	SO
Luke Walker	2	5	0	0	0.00	5
Vern Law	29	217 1/3	17	9	2.15	101
Al McBean	62	114	6	6	2.29	54
Roy Face	16	20 1/3	5	2	2.66	19
Bob Veale	39	266	17	12	2.84	276
Don Schwall	43	77	9	6	2.92	55
Wilbur Wood	34	51 1/3	1	1	3.16	29
Frank Carpin	39	39 2/3	3	1	3.18	27
Don Cardwell	37	240 1/3	13	10	3.18	107
Bob Friend	34	222	8	12	3.24	74
Tommie Sisk	38	111 1/3	7	3	3.40	66
Joe Gibbon	31	105 2/3	4	9	4.51	63
Tom Butters	5	9	0	1	7.00	6
Team totals	163	1479	90	72	3.01	882

== Farm system ==
Level	Team	League	Manager
AAA	Columbus Jets	International League	Larry Shepard
AA	Asheville Tourists	Southern League	Harding "Pete" Peterson
A	Kinston Eagles	Carolina League	Bob Clear
A	Batavia Pirates	New York–Penn League	Tom Saffell
A	Gastonia Pirates	Western Carolinas League	Clyde Sukeforth and Don Osborn
Rookie	Salem Pirates	Appalachian League	George Detore

LEAGUE CHAMPIONS: Salem
