= 1965 St. Louis Cardinals season =

Major League Baseball season

1965 St. Louis Cardinals
- League: National League
- Ballpark: Busch Stadium I
- City: St. Louis, Missouri
- Record: 80–81 (.497)
- League place: 7th
- Owners: August "Gussie" Busch
- General managers: Bob Howsam
- Managers: Red Schoendienst
- Television: KSD-TV
- Radio: KMOX (Harry Caray, Jack Buck, Jerry Gross)

The 1965 St. Louis Cardinals season was the team's 84th season in St. Louis, Missouri and its 74th season in the National League. The Cardinals went 80–81 during the season and finished seventh in the National League, 16 1/2 games behind the eventual World Series champion Los Angeles Dodgers. It was also the last full season for the original Busch Stadium.

== Offseason ==
- October 15, 1964: Pedro Borbón was signed as an amateur free agent by the St. Louis Cardinals.
- November 30, 1964: Chris Krug was drafted from the Cardinals by the Chicago Cubs in the 1964 minor league draft.
- December 7, 1964: Gordie Richardson and Johnny Lewis were traded by the Cardinals to the New York Mets for Tracy Stallard.
- March 1, 1965: Willie Montañez was signed as an amateur free agent by the Cardinals.

== Regular season ==
The mid-1960s saw changes both on the field and off – all while retaining the core of a remarkable successful franchise and its renewed popularity in St. Louis. Schoendienst's replacement of Keane had been preceded a few weeks earlier by general manager Bing Devine's firing, the redemption of the final pennant drive having come too late to assuage owner August Busch's dwindling patience. Devine was replaced by Bob Howsam, who made a number of moves to shore up a talented but aging team which struggled through the 1965 campaign, finishing mired in 7th place at 80–81. A capable GM if not Devine's equal, Howsam made some moves that worked – and some that did not. Howsam traded aging veterans Bill White, Dick Groat, and utility catcher Bob Uecker to Philadelphia in return for Pat Corrales, Art Mahaffey, and Alex Johnson. Popular third baseman Ken Boyer was dispatched to the Mets in exchange for pitcher Al Jackson. Finally, pitcher Ray Sadecki was traded to the Giants for first baseman Orlando Cepeda in 1966. The latter moves worked better than the former, but the Cardinals still finished in 6th place in 1966, resulting in Howsam's replacement by none other than Cardinals legend Stan Musial. Musial's most notable move was to acquire Yankees' star Roger Maris.

Pitcher Bob Gibson, first baseman Bill White, and outfielder Curt Flood won Gold Gloves this year.

=== Season standings ===
National League
Team	W	L	Pct.	GB	Home	Road
Los Angeles Dodgers	97	65	.599	—	50‍–‍31	47‍–‍34
San Francisco Giants	95	67	.586	2	51‍–‍30	44‍–‍37
Pittsburgh Pirates	90	72	.556	7	49‍–‍32	41‍–‍40
Cincinnati Reds	89	73	.549	8	49‍–‍32	40‍–‍41
Milwaukee Braves	86	76	.531	11	44‍–‍37	42‍–‍39
Philadelphia Phillies	85	76	.528	11½	45‍–‍35	40‍–‍41
St. Louis Cardinals	80	81	.497	16½	42‍–‍39	38‍–‍42
Chicago Cubs	72	90	.444	25	40‍–‍41	32‍–‍49
Houston Astros	65	97	.401	32	36‍–‍45	29‍–‍52
New York Mets	50	112	.309	47	29‍–‍52	21‍–‍60

=== Record vs. opponents ===
1965 National League record Sources:
Team	CHC	CIN	HOU	LAD	MIL	NYM	PHI	PIT	SF	STL
Chicago	—	7–11	8–10	8–10	9–9	11–7–1	8–10	5–13	6–12	10–8–1
Cincinnati	11–7	—	12–6	6–12	12–6	11–7	13–5	8–10	6–12	10–8
Houston	10–8	6–12	—	5–13	4–14	14–4	6–12	8–10	3–15	9–9
Los Angeles	10–8	12–6	13–5	—	10–8	12–6	9–9	9–9	10–8	12–6
Milwaukee	9–9	6–12	14–4	8–10	—	13–5	6–12	9–9	10–8	11–7
New York	7–11–1	7–11	4–14	6–12	5–13	—	7–11–1	4–14	5–13	5–13
Philadelphia	10–8	5–13	12–6	9–9	12–6	11–7–1	—	8–10	8–10	10–7
Pittsburgh	13–5	10–8	10–8	9–9	9–9	14–4	10–8	—	11–7–1	4–14
San Francisco	12–6	12–6	15–3	8–10	8–10	13–5	10–8	7–11–1	—	10–8
St. Louis	8–10–1	8–10	9–9	6–12	7–11	13–5	7–10	14–4	8–10	—

=== Opening Day starters ===
- Ken Boyer
- Lou Brock
- Curt Flood
- Dick Groat
- Julián Javier
- Bob Purkey
- Dave Ricketts
- Bob Skinner
- Bill White

=== Notable transactions ===
- June 8, 1965: Rich Hacker was drafted by the Cardinals in the 39th round of the 1965 Major League Baseball draft, but did not sign.

=== Roster ===
1965 St. Louis Cardinals
Roster
Pitchers: 35 Dennis Aust; 34 Nelson Briles; 32 Steve Carlton; 29 Don Dennis; 36 Earl Francis; 45 Bob Gibson; 39 Larry Jaster; 28 Bob Purkey; 37 Ray Sadecki; 33 Barney Schultz; 31 Curt Simmons; 40 Tracy Stallard; 39 Ron Taylor; 44 Ray Washburn; 46 Hal Woodeshick	Catchers: 15 Tim McCarver; 10 Dave Ricketts; 9 Bob Uecker; Infielders: 14 Ken Boyer; 11 Jerry Buchek; 16 Phil Gagliano; 24 Dick Groat; 25 Julián Javier; 30 George Kernek; 27 Dal Maxvill; 26 Ed Spiezio; 12 Bill White	Outfielders: 20 Lou Brock; 21 Curt Flood; 23 Tito Francona; 22 Ted Savage; 18 Mike Shannon; 19 Bob Skinner; 17 Bobby Tolan; 17 Carl Warwick	Manager: 2 Red Schoendienst; Coaches: 4 Joe Becker; 8 Bob Milliken; 3 Joe Schultz; 7 Mickey Vernon

== Player stats ==
=== Batting ===
==== Starters by position ====
Note: Pos = Position; G = Games played; AB = At bats; H = Hits; Avg. = Batting average; HR = Home runs; RBI = Runs batted in

Pos	Player	G	AB	H	Avg.	HR	RBI
C	Tim McCarver	113	409	113	.276	11	48
1B	Bill White	148	543	157	.289	24	73
2B	Julián Javier	77	229	52	.227	2	23
SS	Dick Groat	153	587	149	.254	0	52
3B	Ken Boyer	144	535	139	.260	13	75
LF	Lou Brock	155	631	182	.288	16	69
CF	Curt Flood	156	617	191	.310	11	83
RF	Mike Shannon	124	244	54	.221	3	25

==== Other batters ====
Note: G = Games played; AB = At bats; H = Hits; Avg. = Batting average; HR = Home runs; RBI = Runs batted in

Player	G	AB	H	Avg.	HR	RBI
Phil Gagliano	122	363	87	.240	8	53
Tito Francona	81	174	45	.259	5	19
Jerry Buchek	55	166	41	.247	3	21
Bob Skinner	80	152	47	.309	5	26
Bob Uecker	53	145	33	.228	2	10
Dal Maxvill	68	89	12	.135	0	10
Carl Warwick	50	77	12	.156	0	6
Bobby Tolan	17	69	13	.188	0	6
Ted Savage	30	63	10	.159	1	4
George Kernek	10	31	9	.290	0	3
Dave Ricketts	11	29	7	.241	0	0
Ed Spiezio	10	18	3	.167	0	5

=== Pitching ===
==== Starting pitchers ====
Note: G = Games pitched; IP = Innings pitched; W = Wins; L = Losses; ERA = Earned run average; SO = Strikeouts

Player	G	IP	W	L	ERA	SO
Bob Gibson	38	299.0	20	12	3.07	270
Curt Simmons	34	203.0	9	15	4.08	96
Ray Sadecki	36	172.2	6	15	5.21	122
Larry Jaster	4	28.0	3	0	1.61	10

==== Other pitchers ====
Note: G = Games pitched; IP = Innings pitched; W = Wins; L = Losses; ERA = Earned run average; SO = Strikeouts

Player	G	IP	W	L	ERA	SO
Tracy Stallard	40	194.1	11	8	3.38	99
Bob Purkey	32	124.1	10	9	5.79	39
Ray Washburn	28	119.1	9	11	3.62	67

==== Relief pitchers ====
Note: G = Games pitched; W = Wins; L = Losses; SV = Saves; ERA = Earned run average; SO = Strikeouts

Player	G	W	L	SV	ERA	SO
Hal Woodeshick	51	3	2	15	1.81	37
Don Dennis	41	2	3	6	2.29	29
Nelson Briles	37	3	3	4	3.50	52
Barney Schultz	34	2	2	2	3.83	38
Ron Taylor	25	2	1	1	4.53	26
Steve Carlton	15	0	0	0	2.52	21
Dennis Aust	6	0	0	1	4.91	7
Earl Francis	2	0	0	0	5.06	3

== Awards and honors ==
=== League leaders ===
- Lou Brock, National League leader, stolen bases, 63

== Farm system ==
Level	Team	League	Manager
AAA	Jacksonville Suns	International League	Grover Resinger
AA	Tulsa Oilers	Texas League	Vern Rapp
A	Raleigh Cardinals	Carolina League	Ray Hathaway
A	Cedar Rapids Cardinals	Midwest League	Ron Plaza
A	Rock Hill Cardinals	Western Carolinas League	Sparky Anderson
Rookie	FRL Cardinals	Florida Rookie League	George Kissell

LEAGUE CHAMPIONS: Rock Hill
