= Jim Maloney =

American baseball player (born 1940)

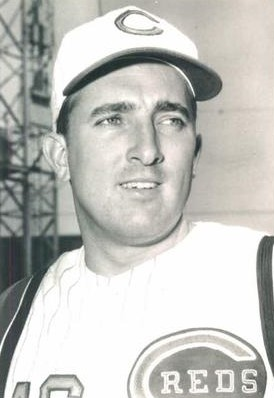
- Pitcher
- Born: June 2, 1940 (age 86); Fresno, California, U.S.
- Batted: Left Threw: Right

MLB debut
- July 27, 1960, for the Cincinnati Reds

Last MLB appearance
- September 21, 1971, for the California Angels

MLB statistics
- Win–loss record: 134–84
- Earned run average: 3.19
- Strikeouts: 1,605
- Stats at Baseball Reference

Teams
- Cincinnati Reds (1960–1970); California Angels (1971)

Career highlights and awards
- All-Star (1965); Pitched two no-hitters (1965, 1969); Cincinnati Reds Hall of Fame

James William Maloney (born June 2, 1940) is an American former professional baseball pitcher who played in Major League Baseball for the Cincinnati Reds (1960–1970) and California Angels (1971). One of the hardest-throwing pitchers of the 1960s, Maloney threw two no-hitters, won ten or more games from 1963 to 1969, and recorded over 200 strikeouts for four consecutive seasons.

== Early years ==
Maloney was born and raised in Fresno, California. His parents were Earl and Marjorie (née Kickashear) Maloney, and he has a sister, Jeanne. His father was a sandlot and semi-professional baseball player on the West Coast in the 1930s, who later opened one of the largest used car dealerships in Fresno.

After playing Little League and Babe Ruth baseball, Maloney earned a reputation as one of the finest athletes in the history of Fresno High School.

Though he starred on the basketball and football teams, his passion was baseball. As a shortstop, he batted .310, .340, and .500 in his sophomore through senior seasons, while leading the team to three consecutive undefeated seasons and Northern Yosemite League championships from 1956 to 1958. He was scouted by all 16 Major League teams as a shortstop. After briefly attending UC Berkeley, Maloney attended Fresno City College, where he pitched for the baseball team at the urging of scout Bobby Mattick. He signed with the Cincinnati Reds in 1959 for a reported $100,000.

== Career ==
At age 21 in 1961, Maloney had one appearance in relief in the World Series, hurling 2/3 of an inning early in the fifth and final game as the Reds fell to the New York Yankees.

In 1963, Maloney was 23–7 and struck out 265 batters; in 1965, he was 20–9 and struck out 244; in 1966, he was 16–8 and struck out 216; and in 1968, he was 16–10 and struck out 181.

Injuries shortened his career, robbing him of the chance to pitch for the "Big Red Machine"—the fabled Cincinnati NL dynasty from 1970–79. Maloney ruptured his Achilles tendon in the 1970 preseason and tried to pitch through it, but was ineffective. He pitched in only seven games for the Reds and he was winless in three starts. He was traded to the Angels for Greg Garrett on December 15, 1970. He was winless in four starts and nine appearances in relief in 1971, then retired.

Over his career, he won 134 games and lost 84, with an ERA of 3.19. In 1973, he was elected to the Cincinnati Reds Hall of Fame. As a hitter, Maloney was better than average, posting a .201 batting average (126-for-628) with 7 home runs, 53 RBI, 51 runs, and 33 bases on balls. Defensively, he was about average, recording a .957 fielding percentage.

== No-hitters ==
Maloney pitched two no-hitters by then-current rules (in which he gave up no hits through nine innings) in 1965, while going on to win 20 games that year. His first hitless nine-inning performance was on June 14 against the New York Mets. This Monday night game lasted through ten scoreless innings, with Maloney striking out 18 with just one walk. But rookie right fielder Johnny Lewis led off with a home run to center in the top of the 11th and Maloney lost the game 1–0. At the time, that game was officially recognized as a no-hitter, but the rules were later changed to omit no-hit games that were broken up in extra innings. Maloney had given up a second hit in the 11th inning; at the time he had three one-hitters to his credit.

His second no-hitter (and first official no-hitter under current rules), was two months later on August 19 and also required ten innings, but he won that one 1–0 over the Chicago Cubs. In the first game of a Thursday doubleheader, Maloney out-dueled Larry Jackson, with the Reds winning on a Leo Cárdenas home run with one out in the top of the tenth, which struck the left field foul pole. This was only the third no-hitter since 1901 in which the pitcher who threw it went more than nine innings. Maloney gave up 10 walks and hit a batter, the most baserunners allowed in a no-hitter since 1901. He threw 187 pitches in the game while striking out 12. With the win, he got another raise of a thousand dollars.

His second currently official no-hitter was on April 30, 1969, in which he beat the Houston Astros 10–0 at Crosley Field in Cincinnati, caught by 21-year-old Johnny Bench. He struck out 13 batters and issued five walks.

The next night Don Wilson of the Astros pitched his second career no-hitter in a 4–0 Astros victory. Back-to-back no-hitters had only been thrown once before in major league history, with Gaylord Perry and Ray Washburn doing so in September 1968.

== Personal life ==
Maloney and his wife Lyn reside in Fresno, where he served as director of the city's Alcoholism and Drug Abuse Council. He has three children with his first wife Carolyn.

== See also ==
- List of Major League Baseball no-hitters

Awards and achievements
Preceded by Jim Bunning; Bill Stoneman	No-hitter pitcher August 19, 1965; April 30, 1969	Succeeded by Sandy Koufax; Don Wilson
