= 1965 Milwaukee Braves season =

1965 Milwaukee Braves
- League: National League
- Ballpark: Milwaukee County Stadium
- City: Milwaukee, Wisconsin
- Record: 86–76 (.531)
- League place: 5th
- Owners: William Bartholomay (chairman)
- General managers: John McHale
- Managers: Bobby Bragan
- Television: WSB-TV (Atlanta) (Mel Allen, Ernie Johnson, Hank Morgan)
- Radio: WEMP (Merle Harmon, Blaine Walsh); WSB (Atlanta) (Mel Allen, Ernie Johnson, Hank Morgan)

The 1965 Milwaukee Braves season was the 13th and final season for the franchise in Milwaukee along with the 95th season overall. The Braves finished the season with an 86–76 (.531) record, 11 games behind the eventual World Series champion Los Angeles Dodgers. The Braves were managed by Bobby Bragan and played their home games at County Stadium.

It was the thirteenth consecutive winning season for the Braves, who never had a losing season during their time in Milwaukee. The final home game was on September 22 and the season's home attendance sank to 555,584. The franchise had attempted to move to Atlanta shortly after the 1964 season; it was delayed a year, and the team relocated for the 1966 season.

The Milwaukee Braves compiled a 1,146-890 won-loss record for a .563 winning percentage in 2,036 games. They averaged 88.2 wins per season.

Milwaukee went four seasons without major league baseball (1966–1969); the expansion Seattle Pilots of the American League played just one season in 1969 and became the Milwaukee Brewers in April 1970.

After only three seasons, this was the final season to feature names on the back of the uniforms. It wouldn't be until 1977 when the names would return this time permanently.

== Offseason ==
- October 14, 1964: Phil Roof and Ron Piché were traded by the Braves to the California Angels for a player to be named later. The Angels completed the deal by sending Dan Osinski to the Braves on November 29.
- December 22, 1964: Bobby Del Greco was purchased from the Braves by the Philadelphia Phillies.
- Prior to 1965 season: Merritt Ranew was acquired from the Braves by the San Francisco Giants.

== Regular season ==
=== Season standings ===
National League
Team	W	L	Pct.	GB	Home	Road
Los Angeles Dodgers	97	65	.599	—	50‍–‍31	47‍–‍34
San Francisco Giants	95	67	.586	2	51‍–‍30	44‍–‍37
Pittsburgh Pirates	90	72	.556	7	49‍–‍32	41‍–‍40
Cincinnati Reds	89	73	.549	8	49‍–‍32	40‍–‍41
Milwaukee Braves	86	76	.531	11	44‍–‍37	42‍–‍39
Philadelphia Phillies	85	76	.528	11½	45‍–‍35	40‍–‍41
St. Louis Cardinals	80	81	.497	16½	42‍–‍39	38‍–‍42
Chicago Cubs	72	90	.444	25	40‍–‍41	32‍–‍49
Houston Astros	65	97	.401	32	36‍–‍45	29‍–‍52
New York Mets	50	112	.309	47	29‍–‍52	21‍–‍60

=== Record vs. opponents ===
1965 National League record Sources:
Team	CHC	CIN	HOU	LAD	MIL	NYM	PHI	PIT	SF	STL
Chicago	—	7–11	8–10	8–10	9–9	11–7–1	8–10	5–13	6–12	10–8–1
Cincinnati	11–7	—	12–6	6–12	12–6	11–7	13–5	8–10	6–12	10–8
Houston	10–8	6–12	—	5–13	4–14	14–4	6–12	8–10	3–15	9–9
Los Angeles	10–8	12–6	13–5	—	10–8	12–6	9–9	9–9	10–8	12–6
Milwaukee	9–9	6–12	14–4	8–10	—	13–5	6–12	9–9	10–8	11–7
New York	7–11–1	7–11	4–14	6–12	5–13	—	7–11–1	4–14	5–13	5–13
Philadelphia	10–8	5–13	12–6	9–9	12–6	11–7–1	—	8–10	8–10	10–7
Pittsburgh	13–5	10–8	10–8	9–9	9–9	14–4	10–8	—	11–7–1	4–14
San Francisco	12–6	12–6	15–3	8–10	8–10	13–5	10–8	7–11–1	—	10–8
St. Louis	8–10–1	8–10	9–9	6–12	7–11	13–5	7–10	14–4	8–10	—

=== Notable transactions ===
- May 23, 1965: Lee Maye was traded by the Braves to the Houston Astros for Ken Johnson and Jim Beauchamp.
- June 8, 1965: Duffy Dyer was drafted by the Braves in the 38th round of the 1965 Major League Baseball draft, but did not sign.
- July 21, 1965: Gary Kolb was traded by the Braves to the New York Mets for Jesse Gonder.
- August 5, 1965: Billy Cowan was traded by the New York Mets to the Milwaukee Braves for players to be named later. The Braves completed the deal by sending Lou Klimchock and Ernie Bowman to the Mets on September 25.
- September 1, 1965: The Braves traded a player to be named later to the Houston Astros for Frank Thomas. The Braves completed the deal by sending Mickey Sinnerud (minors) to the Astros on September 11.

=== Roster ===
1965 Milwaukee Braves
Roster
Pitchers: 36 Wade Blasingame; 20 Clay Carroll; 40 Tony Cloninger; 39 Dave Eilers; 34 Hank Fischer; 30 Ken Johnson; 22 Dick Kelley; 23 Denny Lemaster; 35 Phil Niekro; 33 Billy O'Dell; 30,38 Chi-Chi Olivo; 26 Dan Osinski; 37 Bob Sadowski; 18 Bobby Tiefenauer	Catchers: 28 Jesse Gonder; 12 Gene Oliver; 15 Joe Torre; Infielders: 28 Tommie Aaron; 16 Sandy Alomar Sr.; 32 Jim Beauchamp; 2 Frank Bolling; 7 Mike de la Hoz; 11 Lou Klimchock; 41 Eddie Mathews; 19 Denis Menke; 39 Frank Thomas; 14 Woody Woodward	Outfielders: 44 Hank Aaron; 29 Felipe Alou; 18 Johnny Blanchard; 43 Rico Carty; 31 Ty Cline; 27 Billy Cowan; 42 Don Dillard; 48 Mack Jones; 27 Gary Kolb; 24 Lee Maye	Manager: 10 Bobby Bragan; Coaches: 3 Ken Silvestri; 6 Dixie Walker; 4 Jo-Jo White; 5 Whit Wyatt

== Player stats ==
=== Batting ===
==== Starters by position ====
Note: Pos = Position; G = Games played; AB = At bats; H = Hits; Avg. = Batting average; HR = Home runs; RBI = Runs batted in

Pos	Player	G	AB	H	Avg.	HR	RBI
C	Joe Torre	148	523	152	.291	27	80
1B	Felipe Alou	143	555	165	.297	23	78
2B	Frank Bolling	148	535	141	.264	7	50
SS	Woody Woodward	112	265	55	.208	0	11
3B	Eddie Mathews	156	546	137	.251	32	95
LF	Rico Carty	83	271	84	.310	10	35
CF	Mack Jones	143	504	132	.262	31	75
RF	Hank Aaron	150	570	181	.318	32	89

==== Other batters ====
Note: G = Games played; AB = At bats; H = Hits; Avg. = Batting average; HR = Home runs; RBI = Runs batted in

Player	G	AB	H	Avg.	HR	RBI
Gene Oliver	122	392	106	.270	21	58
Ty Cline	123	220	42	.191	0	10
Denis Menke	71	181	44	.243	4	18
Mike de la Hoz	81	176	45	.256	2	11
Sandy Alomar Sr.	67	108	26	.241	0	8
Jesse Gonder	31	53	8	.151	1	5
Lee Maye	15	53	16	.302	2	7
Lou Klimchock	34	39	3	.077	0	3
Frank Thomas	15	33	7	.212	0	1
Gary Kolb	24	27	7	.259	0	1
Billy Cowan	19	27	5	.185	0	0
Don Dillard	20	19	3	.158	1	3
Tommie Aaron	8	16	3	.188	0	1
Johnny Blanchard	10	10	1	.100	1	2
Jim Beauchamp	4	3	0	.000	0	0

=== Pitching ===
==== Starting pitchers ====
Note: G = Games pitched; IP = Innings pitched; W = Wins; L = Losses; ERA = Earned run average; SO = Strikeouts

Player	G	IP	W	L	ERA	SO
Tony Cloninger	40	279.0	24	11	3.29	211
Wade Blasingame	38	224.2	16	10	3.77	117
Ken Johnson	29	179.2	13	8	3.21	123

==== Other pitchers ====
Note: G = Games pitched; IP = Innings pitched; W = Wins; L = Losses; ERA = Earned run average; SO = Strikeouts

Player	G	IP	W	L	ERA	SO
Denny Lemaster	32	146.1	7	13	4.43	111
Bob Sadowski	34	123.0	5	9	4.32	78
Hank Fischer	31	122.2	8	9	3.89	79
Dick Kelley	21	45.0	1	1	3.00	31

==== Relief pitchers ====
Note: G = Games pitched; W = Wins; L = Losses; SV = Saves; ERA = Earned run average; SO = Strikeouts

Player	G	W	L	SV	ERA	SO
Billy O'Dell	62	10	6	19	2.18	78
Dan Osinski	61	0	3	6	2.82	54
Phil Niekro	41	2	3	6	2.89	49
Clay Carroll	19	0	1	1	4.41	16
Chi-Chi Olivo	8	0	1	0	1.38	11
Bobby Tiefenauer	6	0	1	0	7.71	7
Dave Eilers	6	0	0	0	12.27	1

== Farm system ==
Level	Team	League	Manager
AAA	Atlanta Crackers	International League	Bill Adair
AA	Austin Braves	Texas League	Buddy Hicks
A	West Palm Beach Braves	Florida State League	Andy Pafko
A	Yakima Braves	Northwest League	Hub Kittle
Rookie	FRL Braves	Florida Rookie League	Paul Snyder

- Home games for spring training in Florida in 1965 were held at Municipal Stadium in West Palm Beach.
