= Bob Schroder =

American baseball player (born 1944)

- Second baseman/Shortstop
- Born: December 30, 1944 (age 81); Ridgefield, New Jersey, U.S.
- Batted: Left Threw: Right

MLB debut
- April 20, 1965, for the San Francisco Giants

Last MLB appearance
- September 29, 1968, for the San Francisco Giants

MLB statistics
- Batting average: .217
- Home runs: 0
- Runs batted in: 12
- Stats at Baseball Reference

Teams
- San Francisco Giants (1965–1968)

Robert James Schroder (born December 30, 1944) is an American former professional baseball player. He appeared in 138 games, largely as a second baseman and shortstop, over four seasons (1965–1968) for the San Francisco Giants of Major League Baseball (MLB). He batted left-handed, threw right-handed, and was listed at 6 feet (1.8 m) tall and 175 pounds (79 kg).

Schroder signed with the Giants in 1964 after attending Loyola University New Orleans. After a partial rookie pro season spent in the low minor leagues, Schroder was promoted to San Francisco's 40-man roster for 1965 and stayed with the MLB team all season. Under the amended 1962 bonus rule, Major League clubs were compelled to keep players like Schroder on their 25-man roster for their first full season in baseball or risk losing them to another team. Schroder, 20, got into only 31 games and had only ten plate appearances for the contending 1965 Giants. He then split the 1966–1968 campaigns between San Francisco and the Triple-A Phoenix Giants. In 1967, he played in 62 games for San Francisco and logged 135 at bats, his MLB career highs. All told, he batted .217 during his time with the Giants; his 48 hits included five doubles and one triple.

Schroder pinch-hit for Juan Marichal after Marichal was ejected for hitting Los Angeles Dodgers catcher John Roseboro with a bat in the infamous Dodgers-Giants brawl on August 22, 1965.
