= 1965 New York Mets season =

1965 New York Mets
- League: National League
- Ballpark: Shea Stadium
- City: New York
- Record: 50–112 (.309)
- League place: 10th
- Owners: Joan Whitney Payson
- General manager: George Weiss
- Managers: Casey Stengel, Wes Westrum
- Television: WOR-TV
- Radio: WHN (Ralph Kiner, Lindsey Nelson, Bob Murphy)

The 1965 New York Mets season was the fourth regular season for the Mets. They went 50–112 and finished tenth and last in the National League. They were managed by Casey Stengel and Wes Westrum. They played home games at Shea Stadium, where they drew 1.77 million paying fans, third in the National League (and over 500,000 more fans than the New York Yankees).

As WOR-TV, the team' television broadcaster, began to be broadcast on cable starting that year via microwave relay thru the WWOR EMI Service throughout much of the Northeastern United States, it made the Mets the first major league team to broadcast its games via satellite to viewers outside its home city. Home and away games were aired on cable to regional viewers in this part of the country. This is the first season to feature numbers on the front of both home and away jerseys.

== Offseason ==
- November 23, 1964: Warren Spahn was purchased by the Mets from the Milwaukee Braves.
- November 30, 1964: Duke Carmel was drafted from the Mets by the New York Yankees in the 1964 rule 5 draft.
- December 7, 1964: Tracy Stallard and Elio Chacón were traded by the Mets to the St. Louis Cardinals for Gordie Richardson and Johnny Lewis.
- January 15, 1965: George Altman was traded by the Mets to the Chicago Cubs for Billy Cowan.
- April 27, 1965: Yogi Berra signed as a free agent by the Mets.

== Regular season ==
Former Yankee great Yogi Berra, fired as manager of the Bombers even after he had led them to the American League pennant and into the seventh game of the 1964 World Series, signed with the Mets as player–coach during the off-season. Before managing the 1964 Yankees, his last appearance in a game had been as a pinch hitter in Game 3 of the 1963 World Series on October 5; batting for Jim Bouton, Berra lined out to right field off Don Drysdale. With the 1965 Mets, Berra appeared in only four games, with two starts at catcher, and made two hits in nine at bats. On May 9, 1965, he appeared in his final game as a player, three days shy of his 40th birthday. He then served as the Mets' first-base coach through the 1971 season and proved to be a valuable asset to the team, especially with young talent like Jerry Grote coming up.

Following the 1964 season, the Milwaukee Braves sold pitcher Warren Spahn to the Mets. Braves manager Bobby Bragan predicted, "Spahnie won't win six games with the Mets." Spahn took on the dual role of pitcher and pitching coach in New York but won only four and lost twelve. Spahn was put on waivers on July 15, 1965, and released on July 22, 1965. He immediately signed with the San Francisco Giants, with whom he finished the season.

Wes Westrum had joined the Mets as a coach in 1964 and became pitching coach on July 14, 1965, after Spahn's release. When manager Casey Stengel fell and broke his hip on July 25 while celebrating his upcoming 75th birthday at Toots Shor's in Manhattan, Westrum was named interim manager, a position in which he served until Stengel formally retired on August 30, when Westrum became the Mets' official manager, the second in their four-year history.

=== Season standings ===
National League
Team	W	L	Pct.	GB	Home	Road
Los Angeles Dodgers	97	65	.599	—	50‍–‍31	47‍–‍34
San Francisco Giants	95	67	.586	2	51‍–‍30	44‍–‍37
Pittsburgh Pirates	90	72	.556	7	49‍–‍32	41‍–‍40
Cincinnati Reds	89	73	.549	8	49‍–‍32	40‍–‍41
Milwaukee Braves	86	76	.531	11	44‍–‍37	42‍–‍39
Philadelphia Phillies	85	76	.528	11½	45‍–‍35	40‍–‍41
St. Louis Cardinals	80	81	.497	16½	42‍–‍39	38‍–‍42
Chicago Cubs	72	90	.444	25	40‍–‍41	32‍–‍49
Houston Astros	65	97	.401	32	36‍–‍45	29‍–‍52
New York Mets	50	112	.309	47	29‍–‍52	21‍–‍60

=== Record vs. opponents ===
1965 National League record Sources:
Team	CHC	CIN	HOU	LAD	MIL	NYM	PHI	PIT	SF	STL
Chicago	—	7–11	8–10	8–10	9–9	11–7–1	8–10	5–13	6–12	10–8–1
Cincinnati	11–7	—	12–6	6–12	12–6	11–7	13–5	8–10	6–12	10–8
Houston	10–8	6–12	—	5–13	4–14	14–4	6–12	8–10	3–15	9–9
Los Angeles	10–8	12–6	13–5	—	10–8	12–6	9–9	9–9	10–8	12–6
Milwaukee	9–9	6–12	14–4	8–10	—	13–5	6–12	9–9	10–8	11–7
New York	7–11–1	7–11	4–14	6–12	5–13	—	7–11–1	4–14	5–13	5–13
Philadelphia	10–8	5–13	12–6	9–9	12–6	11–7–1	—	8–10	8–10	10–7
Pittsburgh	13–5	10–8	10–8	9–9	9–9	14–4	10–8	—	11–7–1	4–14
San Francisco	12–6	12–6	15–3	8–10	8–10	13–5	10–8	7–11–1	—	10–8
St. Louis	8–10–1	8–10	9–9	6–12	7–11	13–5	7–10	14–4	8–10	—

=== Notable transactions ===
- April 27, 1965: Yogi Berra was signed as a free agent by the Mets.
- May 17, 1965: Yogi Berra was released as a player by the Mets.
- June 8, 1965: 1965 Major League Baseball draft
  - Nolan Ryan was drafted by the Mets in the 12th round.
  - Don Shaw was drafted by the Mets in the 35th round.
- July 17, 1965: Warren Spahn was released by the Mets.
- July 21, 1965: Jesse Gonder was traded by the Mets to the Milwaukee Braves for Gary Kolb.
- August 5, 1965: Billy Cowan was traded by the Mets to the Milwaukee Braves for players to be named later. The Braves completed the deal by sending Lou Klimchock and Ernie Bowman to the Mets on September 25.

== Roster ==
1965 New York Mets
Roster
Pitchers: 31 Larry Bearnarth; 41,42 Jim Bethke; 26 Galen Cisco; 38 Dave Eilers; 22 Jack Fisher; 29 Rob Gardner; 15 Al Jackson; 25 Gary Kroll; 17 Frank Lary; 45 Tug McGraw; 16,35 Larry Miller; 21 Bob Moorhead; 34,36 Dennis Musgraves; 27 Tom Parsons; 18 Dennis Ribant; 41 Gordie Richardson; 45 Dick Selma; 21 Warren Spahn; 43 Darrell Sutherland; 28 Carl Willey	Catchers: 8 Yogi Berra; 5 Chris Cannizzaro; 12 Jesse Gonder; 10 Greg Goossen; 17 Jimmie Schaffer; 49 John Stephenson; 19 Hawk Taylor; Infielders: 10 Kevin Collins; 3 Bud Harrelson; 2 Chuck Hiller; 33 Ron Hunt; 6 Bobby Klaus; 7 Ed Kranepool; 11 Roy McMillan; 1 Charley Smith	Outfielders: 23 Joe Christopher; 3 Billy Cowan; 9 Jim Hickman; 21,34 Cleon Jones; 18 Gary Kolb; 24 Johnny Lewis; 16,48 Danny Napoleon; 14 Ron Swoboda	Manager: 37 Casey Stengel; 51 Wes Westrum; Coaches: 8 Yogi Berra; 52 Don Heffner; 53 Sheriff Robinson; 21 Warren Spahn; 51 Wes Westrum

== Player stats ==
= Indicates team leader

=== Batting ===
==== Starters by position ====
Note: Pos = Position; G = Games played; AB = At bats; R = Runs scored; H = Hits; Avg. = Batting average; HR = Home runs; RBI = Runs batted in; SB = Stolen bases

Pos	Player	G	AB	R	H	Avg.	HR	RBI	SB
C	Chris Cannizzaro	114	251	17	46	.183	0	7	0
1B	Ed Kranepool	153	525	44	133	.253	10	53	1
2B	Chuck Hiller	100	286	24	68	.238	5	21	1
3B	Charley Smith	135	499	49	122	.244	16	62	2
SS	Roy McMillan	157	528	44	128	.242	1	42	1
LF	Ron Swoboda	135	399	52	91	.228	19	50	2
CF	Jim Hickman	141	369	32	87	.236	15	40	3
RF	Johnny Lewis	148	477	64	117	.245	15	45	4

==== Other batters ====
Note: G = Games played; AB = At bats; R = Runs scored; H = Hits; Avg. = Batting average; HR = Home runs; RBI = Runs batted in; SB = Stolen bases

Player	G	AB	R	H	Avg.	HR	RBI	SB
Joe Christopher	148	437	38	109	.249	5	40	4
Bobby Klaus	119	288	30	55	.191	2	12	1
Ron Hunt	57	196	21	47	.240	1	10	2
Billy Cowan	82	156	16	28	.179	3	9	3
John Stephenson	62	121	9	26	.215	4	15	0
Jesse Gonder	53	105	6	25	.238	4	9	0
Danny Napoleon	68	97	5	14	.144	0	7	0
Gary Kolb	40	90	8	15	.167	1	7	3
Cleon Jones	30	74	2	11	.149	1	9	1
Hawk Taylor	25	46	5	7	.152	4	10	0
Bud Harrelson	19	37	3	4	.108	0	0	0
Jimmie Schaffer	24	37	0	5	.135	0	0	0
Greg Goossen	11	31	2	9	.290	1	2	0
Kevin Collins	11	23	3	4	.174	0	0	0
Yogi Berra	4	9	1	2	.222	0	0	0

=== Pitching ===
= Indicates league leader

==== Starting pitchers ====
Note: G = Games pitched; IP = Innings pitched; W = Wins; L = Losses; ERA = Earned run average; SO = Strikeouts

Player	G	IP	W	L	ERA	BB	SO
Jack Fisher	43	253.2	8	24	3.94	68	116
Al Jackson	37	205.1	8	20	4.34	61	120
Warren Spahn	20	126.0	4	12	4.36	35	56
Rob Gardner	5	28.0	0	2	3.21	7	19
Dick Selma	4	26.2	2	1	3.71	9	26

==== Other pitchers ====
Note: G = Games pitched; IP = Innings pitched; W = Wins; L = Losses; ERA = Earned run average; SO = Strikeouts

Player	G	IP	W	L	ERA	SO
Galen Cisco	35	112.1	4	8	4.49	58
Tug McGraw	37	97.2	2	7	3.32	57
Gary Kroll	32	87.0	6	6	4.45	62
Tom Parsons	35	90.2	1	10	4.67	58
Frank Lary	14	57.1	1	3	2.98	23
Carl Willey	13	28.0	1	2	4.18	13
Dennis Musgraves	5	16.0	0	0	0.56	11

==== Relief pitchers ====
Note: G = Games pitched; W = Wins; L = Losses; SV = Saves; ERA = Earned run average; SO = Strikeouts

Player	G	W	L	SV	ERA	SO
Larry Bearnarth	40	3	5	1	4.60	16
Gordie Richardson	35	2	2	2	3.78	43
Larry Miller	28	1	4	0	5.02	36
Jim Bethke	25	2	0	0	4.28	19
Dennis Ribant	19	1	3	3	3.82	13
Darrell Sutherland	18	3	1	0	2.81	16
Dave Eilers	11	1	1	2	4.00	9
Bob Moorhead	9	0	1	0	4.40	5

== Farm system ==
Level	Team	League	Manager
AAA	Buffalo Bisons	International League	Sheriff Robinson and Kerby Farrell
AA	Williamsport Mets	Eastern League	Kerby Farrell and Bunky Warren
A	Auburn Mets	New York–Penn League	Clyde McCullough
A	Greenville Mets	Western Carolinas League	Ken Deal
Rookie	Marion Mets	Appalachian League	Pete Pavlick
