= George Kernek =

American baseball player (1940–2022)

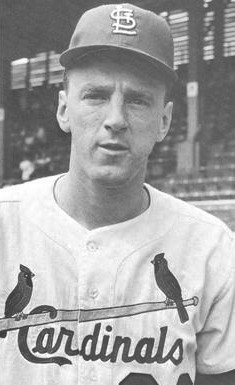
- Kernek in 1965
- First baseman
- Born: January 12, 1940; Holdenville, Oklahoma, U.S.
- Died: August 14, 2022 (aged 82); Purcell, Oklahoma, U.S.
- Batted: Left Threw: Left

MLB debut
- September 5, 1965, for the St. Louis Cardinals

Last MLB appearance
- May 8, 1966, for the St. Louis Cardinals

MLB statistics
- Batting average: .259
- Home runs: 0
- Runs batted in: 6
- Stats at Baseball Reference

Teams
- St. Louis Cardinals (1965–1966)

George Boyd Kernek (January 12, 1940 – August 14, 2022) was an American professional baseball player who appeared in 30 games in Major League Baseball as a first baseman and pinch hitter for the 1965–1966 St. Louis Cardinals. Born in Holdenville, Oklahoma, he threw and batted left-handed, stood 6 feet 3 inches (1.91 m) tall and weighed 170 pounds (77 kg) during his active career.

Kernek attended the University of Oklahoma, where he played baseball and basketball, and joined the Cardinals' minor league organization in 1961. After hitting .295 with 17 home runs and 86 runs batted in in the Triple-A International League in 1965, Kernek was recalled in September; he got into ten games and batted .290 in 31 at bats with four extra-base hits. That winter, the Redbirds traded their veteran All-Star first baseman, Bill White, to the Philadelphia Phillies, opening up his position for competition among younger players like the 26-year-old Kernek. He was St. Louis' Opening Day first baseman (against White's Phillies) and went on to start 14 more games for the Cardinals through May 1. But despite two three-hit games, he was hitting only .239 with one extra-base hit when he lost his starting job. A week later, future Baseball Hall of Fame first baseman Orlando Cepeda was acquired from the San Francisco Giants. That same day, Kernek struck out as a pinch hitter against the Giants' Lindy McDaniel. It was his last MLB appearance.

Kernek returned to the minors for 41/2 more seasons, retiring at the end of 1970. In the majors, he collected 21 hits in 81 official at-bats, including three doubles and two triples, batting .259 with six career runs batted in.

Kernek died on August 14, 2022.
