= Jim Bailey (baseball) =

American baseball player (1934–2022)

- Pitcher
- Born: December 16, 1934; Strawberry Plains, Tennessee, U.S.
- Died: October 12, 2022 (aged 87); Ten Mile, Tennessee, U.S.
- Batted: Left Threw: Left

MLB debut
- September 10, 1959, for the Cincinnati Reds

Last MLB appearance
- September 20, 1959, for the Cincinnati Reds

MLB statistics
- Win–loss record: 0–1
- Earned run average: 6.17
- Strikeouts: 7
- Stats at Baseball Reference

Teams
- Cincinnati Reds (1959)

James Hopkins Bailey (December 16, 1934 – October 12, 2022) was an American professional baseball player. A left-handed pitcher, Bailey played briefly in Major League Baseball for the Cincinnati Reds during the 1959 season. He was the younger brother of the late catcher Ed Bailey, who was his teammate (and batterymate) on the Reds. The Baileys were natives of Strawberry Plains, Tennessee.

Listed as 6 feet 2 inches (1.88 metres) tall and 190 pounds (86 kilograms), Jim Bailey attended Lincoln Memorial University and signed with Cincinnati in 1956. He was recalled by the Reds after spending four seasons in their farm system.

In three MLB games pitched, Bailey posted a 0–1 record with seven strikeouts and a 6.17 ERA, allowing 17 hits and six bases on balls in 11 2/3 innings, including one start. The start coincided with his MLB debut, September 10, 1959, at Wrigley Field against the Chicago Cubs. With brother Ed catching for him, the rookie southpaw pitched well into the eighth inning, with only three earned runs allowed, but then surrendered three more runs to Chicago, pinning him with the 6–3 loss.

Bailey retired from pro ball in 1961 after a six-year career.

He died on October 12, 2022, at the age of 87.
