= Frank Carpin =

American baseball player (born 1938)

- Pitcher
- Born: September 14, 1938 (age 87); Brooklyn, New York, U.S.
- Batted: Left Threw: Left

MLB debut
- May 25, 1965, for the Pittsburgh Pirates

Last MLB appearance
- September 3, 1966, for the Houston Astros

MLB statistics
- Win–loss record: 4–1
- Earned run average: 3.74
- Strikeouts: 29
- Stats at Baseball Reference

Teams
- Pittsburgh Pirates (1965); Houston Astros (1966)

Frank Dominic Carpin (born September 14, 1938) is an American former professional baseball pitcher, who played in Major League Baseball (MLB) for the Pittsburgh Pirates and Houston Astros. Before the 1959 season, Carpin was signed by the New York Yankees as an amateur free agent. On November 30, 1964, he was drafted by the Pittsburgh Pirates from the New York Yankees in the 1964 minor league draft. A year later, on November 29, 1965, he was drafted by the Houston Astros from the Pittsburgh Pirates in the 1965 rule 5 draft.
