= Del Crandall =

American baseball player and manager (1930–2021)

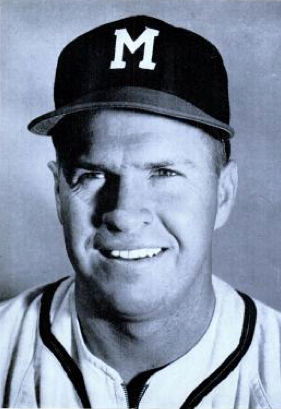
- Crandall in 1955
- Catcher / Manager
- Born: March 5, 1930; Ontario, California, U.S.
- Died: May 5, 2021 (aged 91); Mission Viejo, California, U.S.
- Batted: Right Threw: Right

MLB debut
- June 17, 1949, for the Boston Braves

Last MLB appearance
- September 14, 1966, for the Cleveland Indians

MLB statistics
- Batting average: .254
- Home runs: 179
- Runs batted in: 657
- Managerial record: 364–469
- Winning %: .437
- Stats at Baseball Reference

Teams
- As player: Boston / Milwaukee Braves (1949–1963); San Francisco Giants (1964); Pittsburgh Pirates (1965); Cleveland Indians (1966); As manager: Milwaukee Brewers (1972–1975); Seattle Mariners (1983–1984)

Career highlights and awards
- 11× All-Star (1953–1956, 1958–1960², 1962, 1962²); World Series champion (1957); 4× Gold Glove Award (1958–1960, 1962); Braves Hall of Fame

Delmar Wesley Crandall (March 5, 1930 – May 5, 2021) was an American professional baseball player and manager. Crandall played as a catcher in Major League Baseball from 1949 to 1966, most prominently as a member of the Boston / Milwaukee Braves where, he was an 11-time All-Star player and was a member of the 1957 World Series winning team.

A four-time Gold Glove Award winner, Crandall was the top defensive catcher of his era, leading the National League in assists a record-tying six times, in fielding percentage four times and in putouts three times. Crandall was the last living player to have played for the Boston Braves. In 2003, Crandall was inducted into the Braves Hall of Fame.

== Early life ==
Crandall was born in Ontario, California, on March 5, 1930. He was the second of three children of Richard and Nancy Crandall, who were both employed in the citrus-packaging industry. He was raised in Fullerton and attended Fullerton Union High School. Crandall played catcher for the school team and for the local American Legion Baseball team. He was signed as an amateur free agent by the Boston Braves before the 1948 season.

== Playing career ==
Crandall played less than two seasons in the minor leagues from 1948 to 1949. He made his MLB debut on June 17, 1949, at the age of 19, entering as a pinch runner in the final inning of a 7–2 loss to the Cincinnati Reds. Crandall appeared in 146 games for Boston in 1949 and 1950, before entering military service during the Korean War. When his two-year hitch was over in March 1953, the Braves departed Boston for Milwaukee, where they benefited from an offense featuring Hank Aaron, Eddie Mathews and Joe Adcock. Crandall seized the regular catcher's job from Walker Cooper in 1953 and held it for eight years, handling Braves pitchers such as left-hander Warren Spahn and right-handers Lew Burdette and Bob Buhl. From 1953 to 1959, the Braves' pitching staff finished either first or second in the National League in team earned run average every year except 1955. Burdette credited Crandall for some of his success, saying, "I never—well hardly ever—have to shake him off. He knows the job like no one else, and you can have faith in his judgment". On September 11, 1955, with the Braves trailing the Philadelphia Phillies, 4–1, with two outs and a 3–2 count in the ninth inning, Crandall hit a grand slam to win the game. The Braves won National League (NL) pennants in 1957 and 1958, also finishing in second place five times between 1953 and 1960, and captured the 1957 World Series championship—the franchise's first title since 1914. Though he batted .211 in the 1957 series against the New York Yankees, Crandall had a solo home run for the Braves' final run in a 5–0 win in the deciding Game 7.

Though rarely among the league leaders in offensive categories, he finished 10th in the 1958 Most Valuable Player Award voting after hitting .272, tying his best mark to that point, with career highs in doubles and walks; Crandall also led the league in putouts, assists and fielding average, and won his first Gold Glove. In the 1958 World Series, again against the Yankees, he hit .240; he slugged another Game 7 solo home run, tying the score, 2–2, in the sixth inning, though the Yankees went on to score four more runs to win the game and the title.

Crandall averaged 125 games caught during the peak of his career but missed most of the 1961 season with a shoulder injury, which gave Joe Torre his opportunity to break in. While Crandall did come back to catch 90 games in 1962—hitting a career-high .297, making his final NL All-Star squad and winning his last Gold Glove; he was soon replaced by Torre as the Braves' regular catcher. In 1962, Crandall also moved ahead of Roy Campanella, setting the NL record for career fielding percentage; however, John Roseboro would edge ahead of him before his career ended. After 1963, Crandall was traded by the Braves to the San Francisco Giants in a seven-player deal; he played a backup role in his final three major league seasons with the Giants in 1964, Pittsburgh Pirates in 1965, and Cleveland Indians in 1966.

== Career statistics and legacy ==
In 1,573 games over 16 seasons, Crandall finished with a batting average of .254 with 179 home runs; his 175 homers in the National League (NL) trailed only Campanella (242), Gabby Hartnett (236), and Ernie Lombardi (190) among the league's catchers when he retired. His 1,430 games caught in the NL trailed only Al López, Hartnett, and Lombardi. His career .404 slugging average also placed him among the league's top ten receivers. He was selected as an All-Star eight times during his career: 1953–1956, 1958–1960, 1962. A powerful right-handed hitter, Crandall topped 20 home runs in three seasons.

Crandall was a superb defender with a strong arm; he threw out 45.44% of the base runners who tried to steal a base on him, ranking in the top 100 all-time. Crandall ended his career among the major league career leaders in putouts (4th, 7,352), total chances (8th, 8,200) and fielding percentage (5th, .989) behind the plate, and ranked fourth in NL history in games caught. Crandall won four of the first five Gold Glove Awards given to a NL catcher and tied another record by catching three no-hitters (later surpassed by Jason Varitek). After having caught Jim Wilson's no-hitter on June 12, 1954, he added another pair in 1960—by Burdette on August 18, and by Spahn a month later on September 16; all three were against the Philadelphia Phillies. Richard Kendall of the Society for American Baseball Research devised a study that ranked Crandall as the fourth most dominating fielding catcher in major league history. The youngest battery to play in the major leagues was Boston's battery of Crandell catching and Johnny Antonnelli pitching, both were 19 years old on June 24, 1949.

Crandall and pitcher Warren Spahn started 316 games as a battery, a record that lasted from 1963 until 1975. Spahn and Crandall currently rank as the third-most starts by a battery since 1900.

Crandall was the last living Boston Brave, following the death of Bert Thiel on July 31, 2020.

Crandall was inducted into the Braves Hall of Fame in 2003 and was added to the Milwaukee Braves Wall of Honor.

== Post-playing career ==
=== Managing and coaching career ===
Crandall piloted two American League clubs, the Milwaukee Brewers (1972–75) and the Seattle Mariners (1983–84). In each case, he was hired to try to right a losing team in mid-season, but he never enjoyed a winning campaign with either team and finished with a managing record of 364–469 (.437). In between those American League stints, he was a successful manager of the Los Angeles Dodgers' top farm club, the Albuquerque Dukes of the Triple-A Pacific Coast League, and also managed the Class A San Bernardino Stampede from 1995 to 1997. He remained in the Dodger organization as a special catching instructor well into his 60s.

=== Broadcasting career ===
Crandell worked as a sports announcer with the Chicago White Sox radio team from 1985 through 1988 and with the Brewers from 1992 to 1994.

== Personal life ==
Crandall married Frances Sorrells in 1951, one day before he reported for military service. Together, they had six children who survived him, in addition to Ronnie, who died when he was 7 years old from complications of cerebral palsy. The family relocated to Brookfield, Wisconsin in 1959. After he retired, he moved to Brea, California.

Crandall died on May 5, 2021 at his home in Mission Viejo, California. He was 91 and had Parkinson's disease, heart disease, and suffered several strokes prior to his death.

== See also ==
- List of Major League Baseball ultimate grand slams
