= 1965 Chicago Cubs season =

1965 Chicago Cubs
- League: National League
- Ballpark: Wrigley Field
- City: Chicago
- Record: 72–90 (.444)
- League place: 8th
- Owners: Philip K. Wrigley
- General managers: John Holland
- Managers: Bob Kennedy, Lou Klein
- Television: WGN-TV (Jack Brickhouse, Lloyd Pettit)
- Radio: WGN (Vince Lloyd, Lou Boudreau)

The 1965 Chicago Cubs season was the 94th season of the Chicago Cubs franchise, the 90th in the National League and the 50th at Wrigley Field. The Cubs finished eighth in the National League with a record of 72–90.

The 1965 Cubs tied a major league record by turning three triple plays. Bill Faul was on the mound on each occasion.

== Offseason ==
- November 30, 1964: 1964 minor league draft
  - Bobby Cox was drafted by the Cubs from the Los Angeles Dodgers.
  - Chris Krug was drafted by the Cubs from the St. Louis Cardinals.
- January 15, 1965: Billy Cowan was traded by the Cubs to the New York Mets for George Altman.

== Regular season ==
=== Season standings ===
National League
Team	W	L	Pct.	GB	Home	Road
Los Angeles Dodgers	97	65	.599	—	50‍–‍31	47‍–‍34
San Francisco Giants	95	67	.586	2	51‍–‍30	44‍–‍37
Pittsburgh Pirates	90	72	.556	7	49‍–‍32	41‍–‍40
Cincinnati Reds	89	73	.549	8	49‍–‍32	40‍–‍41
Milwaukee Braves	86	76	.531	11	44‍–‍37	42‍–‍39
Philadelphia Phillies	85	76	.528	11½	45‍–‍35	40‍–‍41
St. Louis Cardinals	80	81	.497	16½	42‍–‍39	38‍–‍42
Chicago Cubs	72	90	.444	25	40‍–‍41	32‍–‍49
Houston Astros	65	97	.401	32	36‍–‍45	29‍–‍52
New York Mets	50	112	.309	47	29‍–‍52	21‍–‍60

=== Record vs. opponents ===
1965 National League record Sources:
Team	CHC	CIN	HOU	LAD	MIL	NYM	PHI	PIT	SF	STL
Chicago	—	7–11	8–10	8–10	9–9	11–7–1	8–10	5–13	6–12	10–8–1
Cincinnati	11–7	—	12–6	6–12	12–6	11–7	13–5	8–10	6–12	10–8
Houston	10–8	6–12	—	5–13	4–14	14–4	6–12	8–10	3–15	9–9
Los Angeles	10–8	12–6	13–5	—	10–8	12–6	9–9	9–9	10–8	12–6
Milwaukee	9–9	6–12	14–4	8–10	—	13–5	6–12	9–9	10–8	11–7
New York	7–11–1	7–11	4–14	6–12	5–13	—	7–11–1	4–14	5–13	5–13
Philadelphia	10–8	5–13	12–6	9–9	12–6	11–7–1	—	8–10	8–10	10–7
Pittsburgh	13–5	10–8	10–8	9–9	9–9	14–4	10–8	—	11–7–1	4–14
San Francisco	12–6	12–6	15–3	8–10	8–10	13–5	10–8	7–11–1	—	10–8
St. Louis	8–10–1	8–10	9–9	6–12	7–11	13–5	7–10	14–4	8–10	—

=== Notable transactions ===
- April 9, 1965: Don Elston was released by the Cubs.
- May 29, 1965: Len Gabrielson and Dick Bertell were traded by the Cubs to the San Francisco Giants for Ed Bailey, Bob Hendley and Harvey Kuenn.
- June 8, 1965: 1965 Major League Baseball draft
  - Ken Rudolph was drafted by the Cubs in the 2nd round.
  - Ken Holtzman was drafted by the Cubs in the 4th round.
- September 11, 1965: Ellis Burton was released by the Cubs.

=== Roster ===
1965 Chicago Cubs
Roster
Pitchers: 39 Ted Abernathy; 48 Frank Baumann; 32 Ernie Broglio; 31 Bob Buhl; 33 Lew Burdette; 37 Dick Ellsworth; 13 Bill Faul; 33 Bob Hendley; 40 Billy Hoeft; 30 Ken Holtzman; 36,39 Bob Humphreys; 46 Larry Jackson; 34 Cal Koonce; 43 Lindy McDaniel; 40 Jack Warner	Catchers: 6 Ed Bailey; 6 Dick Bertell; 15 Leo Burke; 25 Chris Krug; 8 Vic Roznovsky; Infielders: 17 Joey Amalfitano; 14 Ernie Banks; 18 Glenn Beckert; 22 John Boccabella; 11 Don Kessinger; 7,28,41 Roberto Peña; 10 Ron Santo	Outfielders: 21 George Altman; 29 Byron Browne; 24 Ellis Burton; 27 Doug Clemens; 12 Len Gabrielson; 7 Harvey Kuenn; 20 Don Landrum; 19 Jimmy Stewart; 26 Billy Williams; 23 Don Young; Other batters: 29 Harry Bright; 15 Ron Campbell; 42 Chuck Hartenstein	Head coach: 61 Bob Kennedy; 60 Lou Klein; Coaches College of Coaches

== Player stats ==
= Indicates team leader

=== Batting ===
==== Starters by position ====
Note: Pos = Position; G = Games played; AB = At bats; H = Hits; Avg. = Batting average; HR = Home runs; RBI = Runs batted in

Pos	Player	G	AB	H	Avg.	HR	RBI
C	Vic Roznovsky	71	172	38	.221	3	15
1B	Ernie Banks	163	612	162	.265	28	106
2B	Glenn Beckert	154	614	147	.239	3	30
SS	Don Kessinger	106	309	62	.201	0	14
3B	Ron Santo	164	608	173	.285	33	101
LF	George Altman	90	196	46	.235	4	23
CF	Don Landrum	131	425	96	.226	6	34
RF	Billy Williams	164	645	203	.315	34	108

==== Other batters ====
Note: G = Games played; AB = At bats; H = Hits; Avg. = Batting average; HR = Home runs; RBI = Runs batted in

Player	G	AB	H	Avg.	HR	RBI
Doug Clemens	128	340	75	.221	4	26
Jimmy Stewart	116	282	63	.223	0	19
Roberto Peña	51	170	37	.218	2	12
Chris Krug	60	169	34	.201	5	24
Ed Bailey	66	150	38	.253	5	23
Harvey Kuenn	54	120	26	.217	0	6
Joey Amalfitano	67	96	26	.271	0	8
Dick Bertell	34	84	18	.214	0	7
Len Gabrielson	28	48	12	.250	3	5
Ellis Burton	17	40	7	.175	0	4
Donald Young	11	35	2	.057	1	2
Harry Bright	27	25	7	.280	0	4
John Boccabella	6	12	4	.333	2	4
Leo Burke	12	10	2	.200	0	0
Byron Browne	4	6	0	.000	0	0
Ron Campbell	2	2	0	.000	0	0
Chuck Hartenstein	1	0	0	----	0	0

=== Pitching ===
==== Starting pitchers ====
Note: G = Games pitched; IP = Innings pitched; W = Wins; L = Losses; ERA = Earned run average; SO = Strikeouts

Player	G	IP	W	L	ERA	SO
Larry Jackson	39	257.1	14	21	3.85	131
Dick Ellsworth	36	222.1	14	15	3.81	130
Bob Buhl	32	184.1	13	11	4.39	92
Bill Faul	17	96.2	6	6	3.54	59

==== Other pitchers ====
Note: G = Games pitched; IP = Innings pitched; W = Wins; L = Losses; ERA = Earned run average; SO = Strikeouts

Player	G	IP	W	L	ERA	SO
Cal Koonce	38	173.0	7	9	3.69	88
Bob Hendley	18	62.0	4	4	4.35	38
Ernie Broglio	26	50.2	1	6	6.93	22
Lew Burdette	7	20.1	0	2	5.31	5

==== Relief pitchers ====
Note: G = Games pitched; W = Wins; L = Losses; SV = Saves; ERA = Earned run average; SO = Strikeouts

Player	G	W	L	SV	ERA	SO
Ted Abernathy	84	4	6	31	2.57	104
Lindy McDaniel	71	5	6	2	2.59	92
Bob Humphreys	41	2	0	0	3.15	38
Billy Hoeft	29	2	2	1	2.81	44
Jack Warner	11	0	1	0	8.62	7
Frank Baumann	4	0	1	0	7.36	2
Ken Holtzman	3	0	0	0	2.25	3

== Awards and honors ==
All-Star Game

- Ernie Banks, First Base, Reserve
- Ron Santo, Third Base, Reserve
- Billy Williams, Outfield, Reserve

== Farm system ==
Level	Team	League	Manager
AAA	Salt Lake City Bees	Pacific Coast League	Stan Hack
AA	Dallas-Fort Worth Spurs	Texas League	Whitey Lockman
A	Quincy Cubs	Midwest League	Walt Dixon
A	Wenatchee Chiefs	Northwest League	Les Peden
A-Short Season	Duluth–Superior Dukes	Northern League	Doc Daugherty
Rookie	Treasure Valley Cubs	Pioneer League	George Freese

LEAGUE CHAMPIONS: Treasure Valley
Duluth-Superior affiliation shared with Detroit Tigers
