= 1965 San Francisco Giants season =

1965 San Francisco Giants
- League: National League
- Ballpark: Candlestick Park
- City: San Francisco, California
- Record: 95–67 (.586)
- League place: 2nd
- Owners: Horace Stoneham
- General managers: Chub Feeney
- Managers: Herman Franks
- Television: KTVU (Russ Hodges, Lon Simmons)
- Radio: KSFO (Russ Hodges, Lon Simmons, Bill Thompson)

The 1965 San Francisco Giants season was the Giants' 83rd year in Major League Baseball, their eighth year in San Francisco since their move from New York following the 1957 season, and their sixth at Candlestick Park. The team finished in second place in the National League with a 95–67 record, 2 games behind the Los Angeles Dodgers.

== Offseason ==
- Prior to 1965 season: Merritt Ranew was acquired by the Giants from the Milwaukee Braves.

== Regular season ==
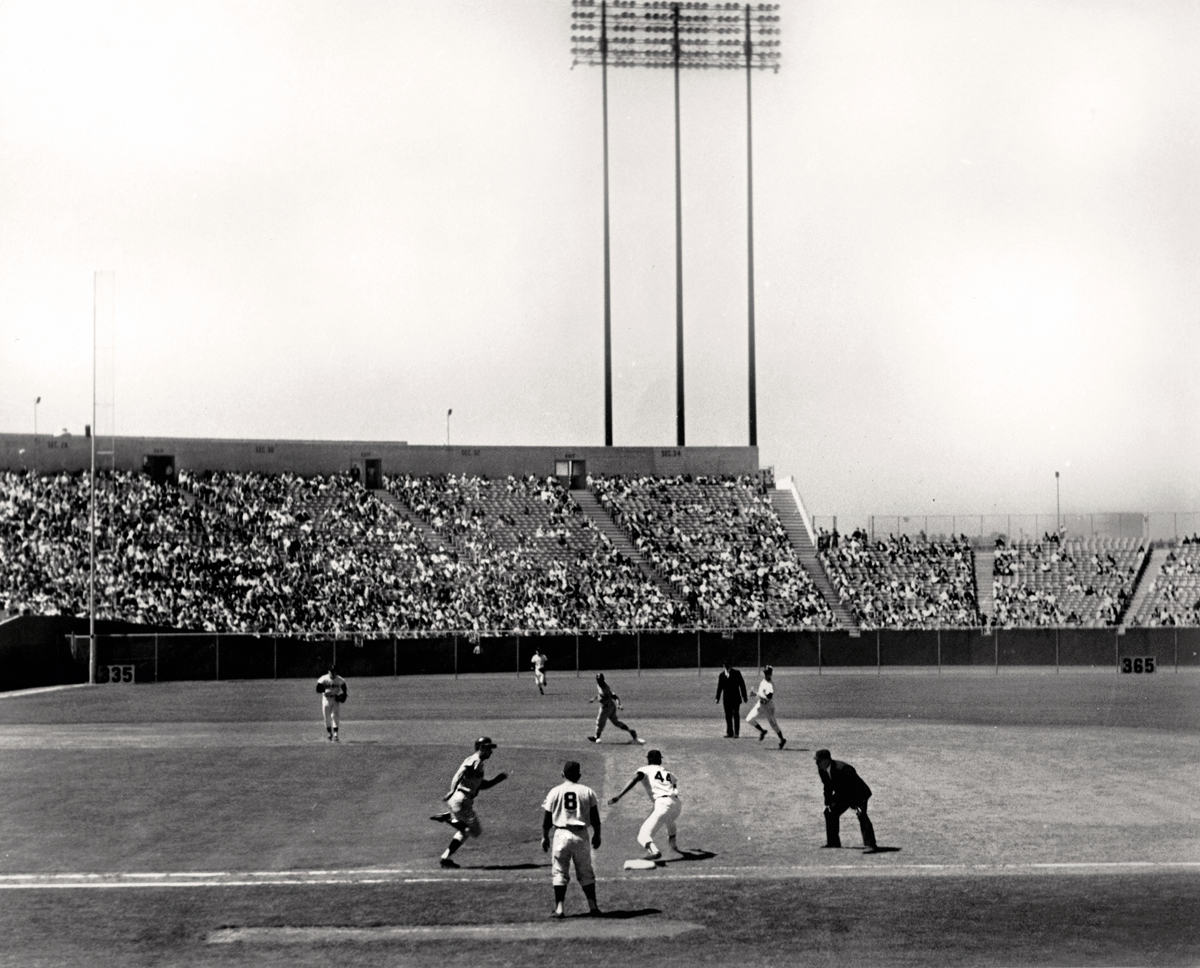
The Giants play at Candlestick Park, 1965.

=== Season standings ===
National League
| Team | W | L | Pct. | GB | Home | Road |
|---|---|---|---|---|---|---|
| Los Angeles Dodgers | 97 | 65 | .599 | — | 50‍–‍31 | 47‍–‍34 |
| San Francisco Giants | 95 | 67 | .586 | 2 | 51‍–‍30 | 44‍–‍37 |
| Pittsburgh Pirates | 90 | 72 | .556 | 7 | 49‍–‍32 | 41‍–‍40 |
| Cincinnati Reds | 89 | 73 | .549 | 8 | 49‍–‍32 | 40‍–‍41 |
| Milwaukee Braves | 86 | 76 | .531 | 11 | 44‍–‍37 | 42‍–‍39 |
| Philadelphia Phillies | 85 | 76 | .528 | 11½ | 45‍–‍35 | 40‍–‍41 |
| St. Louis Cardinals | 80 | 81 | .497 | 16½ | 42‍–‍39 | 38‍–‍42 |
| Chicago Cubs | 72 | 90 | .444 | 25 | 40‍–‍41 | 32‍–‍49 |
| Houston Astros | 65 | 97 | .401 | 32 | 36‍–‍45 | 29‍–‍52 |
| New York Mets | 50 | 112 | .309 | 47 | 29‍–‍52 | 21‍–‍60 |

=== Record vs. opponents ===
1965 National League record Sources:
| Team | CHC | CIN | HOU | LAD | MIL | NYM | PHI | PIT | SF | STL |
|---|---|---|---|---|---|---|---|---|---|---|
| Chicago | — | 7–11 | 8–10 | 8–10 | 9–9 | 11–7–1 | 8–10 | 5–13 | 6–12 | 10–8–1 |
| Cincinnati | 11–7 | — | 12–6 | 6–12 | 12–6 | 11–7 | 13–5 | 8–10 | 6–12 | 10–8 |
| Houston | 10–8 | 6–12 | — | 5–13 | 4–14 | 14–4 | 6–12 | 8–10 | 3–15 | 9–9 |
| Los Angeles | 10–8 | 12–6 | 13–5 | — | 10–8 | 12–6 | 9–9 | 9–9 | 10–8 | 12–6 |
| Milwaukee | 9–9 | 6–12 | 14–4 | 8–10 | — | 13–5 | 6–12 | 9–9 | 10–8 | 11–7 |
| New York | 7–11–1 | 7–11 | 4–14 | 6–12 | 5–13 | — | 7–11–1 | 4–14 | 5–13 | 5–13 |
| Philadelphia | 10–8 | 5–13 | 12–6 | 9–9 | 12–6 | 11–7–1 | — | 8–10 | 8–10 | 10–7 |
| Pittsburgh | 13–5 | 10–8 | 10–8 | 9–9 | 9–9 | 14–4 | 10–8 | — | 11–7–1 | 4–14 |
| San Francisco | 12–6 | 12–6 | 15–3 | 8–10 | 8–10 | 13–5 | 10–8 | 7–11–1 | — | 10–8 |
| St. Louis | 8–10–1 | 8–10 | 9–9 | 6–12 | 7–11 | 13–5 | 7–10 | 14–4 | 8–10 | — |

=== Opening Day lineup ===
- Jesús Alou
- Tom Haller
- Jim Ray Hart
- Harvey Kuenn
- Hal Lanier
- Juan Marichal
- Willie Mays
- Willie McCovey
- José Pagán

=== Notable transactions ===
- May 13, 1965: Merritt Ranew was purchased from the Giants by the California Angels.
- May 29, 1965: Ed Bailey, Bob Hendley and Harvey Kuenn were traded by the Giants to the Chicago Cubs for Len Gabrielson and Dick Bertell.
- June 8, 1965: Rich Robertson was drafted by the Giants in the 5th round of the 1965 Major League Baseball draft.
- July 19, 1965: Warren Spahn was signed as a free agent by the Giants.

== Game log and schedule ==
Legend
| | Giants win |
| | Giants loss |
| | Postponement |
| **Bold** | Giants team member |

1965 Game Log (95–67) (Home: 51–30; Road: 44–37)
April (7–9) (Home: 4–4; Road: 3–5)

| # | Date | Opponent | Score | Win | Loss | Save | Stadium | Attendance | Record | Report |

May (19–11) (Home: 12–6; Road: 7–5)

| # | Date | Opponent | Score | Win | Loss | Save | Stadium | Attendance | Record | Report |

June (14–13) (Home: 8–6; Road: 6–7)

| # | Date | Opponent | Score | Win | Loss | Save | Stadium | Attendance | Record | Report |

July (15–10) (Home: 8–4; Road: 7–6)

| # | Date | Opponent | Score | Win | Loss | Save | Stadium | Attendance | Record | Report |

August (17–14) (Home: 8–5; Road: 9–9)

| # | Date | Opponent | Score | Win | Loss | Save | Stadium | Attendance | Record | Report |

September (21–9) (Home: 9–4; Road: 12–5)

| # | Date | Opponent | Score | Win | Loss | Save | Stadium | Attendance | Record | Report |

October (2–1) (Home: 2–1)

| # | Date | Opponent | Score | Win | Loss | Save | Stadium | Attendance | Record | Report |

=== Roster ===
1965 San Francisco Giants
**Roster**
| **Pitchers**: 42 Bobby Bolin; 45 Jim Duffalo; 38 Dick Estelle; 32 Bill Hands; 38 Bob Hendley; 45 Bill Henry; 34 Ron Herbel; 35 Frank Linzy; 27 Juan Marichal; 37 Masanori Murakami; 36 Gaylord Perry; 47 Bob Priddy; 33 Jack Sanford; 29 Bob Shaw; 21 Warren Spahn | **Catchers**: 6 Ed Bailey; 1 Bob Barton; 6 Dick Bertell; 5 Tom Haller; 2 Jack Hiatt; 1 Randy Hundley; **Infielders**: 25 Bob Burda; 30 Orlando Cepeda; 12 Jim Davenport; 23 Tito Fuentes; 16 Jim Ray Hart; 26 Chuck Hiller; 22 Hal Lanier; 44 Willie McCovey; 15 José Pagán; 15 Dick Schofield; 10 Bob Schroder | **Outfielders**: 14 Jesús Alou; 41 Matty Alou; 48 Ollie Brown; 7,21 Len Gabrielson; 23 Ken Henderson; 7 Harvey Kuenn; 24 Willie Mays; 17 Cap Peterson | **Manager**: 3 Herman Franks; **Coaches**: 9 Charlie Fox; 46 Larry Jansen; 8 Cookie Lavagetto |

=== Juan Marichal bat incident ===
On August 22, 1965, Giants pitcher Juan Marichal was involved in a notorious incident that occurred in a game played against the Los Angeles Dodgers. Batting against Sandy Koufax, Marichal felt that Dodger catcher Johnny Roseboro's return throws had flown too close to his head. Words were exchanged, and Roseboro, throwing off his catcher's helmet and mask, rose to continue the argument. Marichal responded by hitting Roseboro's unprotected head with his bat. The benches cleared into a 14-minute brawl, while Giant captain Willie Mays escorted the bleeding Roseboro (who would require 14 stitches) back to the clubhouse. Marichal was ejected, suspended for nine days and fined US$1,750. Roseboro filed a lawsuit, but eventually settled out of court, supposedly for $7,000. Marichal and Roseboro would eventually go on to become close friends, reconciling any personal animosity and even autographing photographs of the brawl.

The image of Marichal raising his bat over his head to deliver a blow to Roseboro was carried in practically every newspaper in the nation and re-printed in Life magazine. Many people protested the apparently light punishment meted out, but as it was it hurt the Giants considerably. They were in a neck-and-neck pennant race with the Dodgers and the race was decided with only two games to play. Marichal's nine-day suspension cost him two pitching turns, and the Giants lost the pennant by two games.

== Player stats ==
| = Indicates team leader |

| = Indicates league leader |

=== Batting ===
==== Starters by position ====
Note: Pos = Position; G = Games played; AB = At bats; H = Hits; Avg. = Batting average; HR = Home runs; RBI = Runs batted in

| Pos | Player | G | AB | H | Avg. | HR | RBI |
|---|---|---|---|---|---|---|---|
| C | Tom Haller | 134 | 422 | 106 | .251 | 16 | 49 |
| 1B | Willie McCovey | 160 | 540 | 149 | .276 | 39 | 92 |
| 2B | Hal Lanier | 159 | 522 | 118 | .226 | 0 | 39 |
| SS | Dick Schofield | 101 | 379 | 77 | .203 | 2 | 19 |
| 3B | Jim Ray Hart | 160 | 591 | 177 | .299 | 23 | 96 |
| LF | Len Gabrielson | 88 | 269 | 81 | .301 | 4 | 26 |
| CF | Willie Mays | 157 | 558 | 177 | .317 | 52 | 112 |
| RF | Jesús Alou | 143 | 543 | 162 | .298 | 9 | 52 |

==== Other batters ====
Note: G = Games played; AB = At bats; H = Hits; Avg. = Batting average; HR = Home runs; RBI = Runs batted in

| Player | G | AB | H | Avg. | HR | RBI |
|---|---|---|---|---|---|---|
| Matty Alou | 117 | 324 | 75 | .231 | 2 | 18 |
| Jim Davenport | 106 | 271 | 68 | .251 | 4 | 31 |
| Cap Peterson | 63 | 105 | 26 | .248 | 3 | 15 |
| José Pagán | 26 | 83 | 17 | .205 | 0 | 5 |
| Ken Henderson | 63 | 73 | 14 | .192 | 0 | 7 |
| Tito Fuentes | 26 | 72 | 15 | .208 | 0 | 1 |
| Jack Hiatt | 40 | 67 | 19 | .284 | 1 | 7 |
| Harvey Kuenn | 23 | 59 | 14 | .237 | 0 | 6 |
| Dick Bertell | 22 | 48 | 9 | .188 | 0 | 3 |
| Orlando Cepeda | 33 | 34 | 6 | .176 | 1 | 5 |
| Ed Bailey | 24 | 28 | 3 | .107 | 0 | 3 |
| Bob Burda | 31 | 27 | 3 | .111 | 0 | 5 |
| Randy Hundley | 6 | 15 | 1 | .067 | 0 | 0 |
| Ollie Brown | 6 | 10 | 2 | .200 | 0 | 0 |
| Bob Schroder | 31 | 9 | 2 | .222 | 0 | 1 |
| Bob Barton | 4 | 7 | 4 | .571 | 0 | 1 |
| Chuck Hiller | 7 | 7 | 1 | .143 | 1 | 1 |

=== Pitching ===
==== Starting pitchers ====
Note: G = Games pitched; IP = Innings pitched; W = Wins; L = Losses; ERA = Earned run average; SO = Strikeouts

| Player | G | IP | W | L | ERA | SO |
|---|---|---|---|---|---|---|
| Juan Marichal | 39 | 295.1 | 22 | 13 | 2.13 | 240 |
| Bob Shaw | 42 | 235.0 | 16 | 9 | 2.64 | 148 |
| Gaylord Perry | 47 | 195.2 | 8 | 12 | 4.19 | 170 |
| Jack Sanford | 23 | 91.0 | 4 | 5 | 3.96 | 43 |
| Warren Spahn | 16 | 71.2 | 3 | 4 | 3.39 | 34 |

==== Other pitchers ====
Note: G = Games pitched; IP = Innings pitched; W = Wins; L = Losses; ERA = Earned run average; SO = Strikeouts

| Player | G | IP | W | L | ERA | SO |
|---|---|---|---|---|---|---|
| Ron Herbel | 47 | 170.2 | 12 | 9 | 3.85 | 106 |
| Bobby Bolin | 45 | 163.0 | 14 | 6 | 2.76 | 135 |
| Bob Hendley | 8 | 15.0 | 0 | 0 | 12.60 | 8 |
| Dick Estelle | 6 | 11.1 | 0 | 0 | 3.97 | 6 |
| Bill Hands | 4 | 6.0 | 0 | 2 | 16.50 | 5 |

==== Relief pitchers ====
Note: G = Games pitched; W = Wins; L = Losses; SV = Saves; ERA = Earned run average; SO = Strikeouts

| Player | G | W | L | SV | ERA | SO |
|---|---|---|---|---|---|---|
| Frank Linzy | 57 | 9 | 3 | 20 | 1.43 | 35 |
| Masanori Murakami | 45 | 4 | 1 | 8 | 3.75 | 85 |
| Bill Henry | 35 | 2 | 2 | 4 | 3.64 | 35 |
| Bob Priddy | 8 | 1 | 0 | 0 | 1.74 | 7 |
| Jim Duffalo | 2 | 0 | 1 | 0 | 27.00 | 0 |

== Awards and honors ==
- Willie Mays, National League Most Valuable Player

=== All-Stars ===
All-Star Game

- Juan Marichal, All-star Game MVP
- Juan Marichal, Pitcher, Starter
- Willie Mays, Outfield, Starter

== Farm system ==
| Level | Team | League | Manager |
|---|---|---|---|
| AAA | Tacoma Giants | Pacific Coast League | Bill Werle |
| AA | Springfield Giants | Eastern League | Andy Gilbert |
| A | Fresno Giants | California League | Ed Fitz Gerald |
| A | Decatur Commodores | Midwest League | Richie Klaus |
| A | Lexington Giants | Western Carolinas League | Max Lanier |
| Rookie | Magic Valley Cowboys | Pioneer League | Dick Wilson |
