= Vic Roznovsky =

American baseball player (1938–2022)

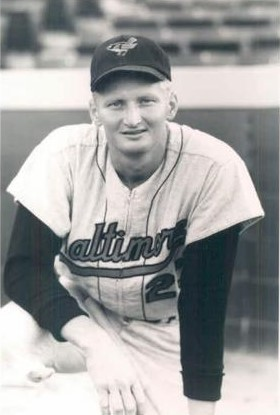
- Catcher
- Born: October 19, 1938; Shiner, Texas, U.S.
- Died: January 18, 2022 (aged 83); Fresno, California, U.S.
- Batted: Left Threw: Right

MLB debut
- June 28, 1964, for the Chicago Cubs

Last MLB appearance
- October 1, 1969, for the Philadelphia Phillies

MLB statistics
- Batting average: .218
- Home runs: 4
- Runs batted in: 38
- Stats at Baseball Reference

Teams
- Chicago Cubs (1964–1965); Baltimore Orioles (1966–1967); Philadelphia Phillies (1969)

Victor Joseph Roznovsky (October 19, 1938 – January 18, 2022) was an American professional baseball catcher who played in Major League Baseball (MLB) for the Chicago Cubs, Baltimore Orioles, and Philadelphia Phillies, from 1964 to 1969. During his playing days, Roznovsky stood 6 feet 1 inch (1.85 m) tall, weighing 180 pounds (82 kg). He batted left-handed and threw right-handed.

The most big league action Roznovsky saw in any one season was with the 1965 Cubs, when he appeared in 71 games with 193 plate appearances. He was acquired by the Orioles from the Cubs for Carl Warwick on March 31, 1966. He was on the Orioles' roster for the 1966 World Series but did not appear in any games. Roznovsky was traded to the Phillies on April 12, 1969, ending his career there.

Roznovsky died in Fresno, California on January 18, 2022, at the age of 83.
