= Dave Eilers =

American baseball player (born 1936)

- Pitcher
- Born: December 3, 1936 (age 89); Oldenburg, Texas, U.S.
- Batted: Right Threw: Right

MLB debut
- July 27, 1964, for the Milwaukee Braves

Last MLB appearance
- September 26, 1967, for the Houston Astros

MLB statistics
- Win–loss record: 8–6
- Earned run average: 4.45
- Strikeouts: 52
- Stats at Baseball Reference

Teams
- Milwaukee Braves (1964–1965); New York Mets (1965–1966); Houston Astros (1967)

David Louis Eilers (born December 3, 1936) is an American former professional baseball pitcher who worked in 81 games—all in relief—for the Milwaukee Braves, New York Mets and Houston Astros of Major League Baseball between 1964 and 1967. A right-hander, he was born in Oldenburg, Texas, stood 5 feet 11 inches (1.80 m) tall and weighed 188 pounds (85 kg).

Eilers began his professional career in the Braves' organization in 1959. Highly successful in the minor leagues, where he would register a stellar 97–50 won–lost record in 424 appearances over 11 seasons, he got into 12 games during 1964 and 1965 for Milwaukee before his contract was sold to the Mets in August 1965. He went 2–2 in 34 games with the Mets in 1965 and 1966, and earned his first two MLB saves.

He was selected in the 1966 minor league draft by Houston, and in 1967, his last season in the majors, he worked in 35 games, most of his big-league career. He also set personal bests in games won (6), innings pitched (591/3), earned run average and strikeouts (27). He retired from pro baseball in 1969.

In his 81-game major league career, Eilers won eight games, lost six, and saved three. He allowed 146 hits and 29 bases on balls in 1231/3 innings pitched, and was credited with 37 games finished. He had 52 strikeouts.
