= Jim Bethke =

American baseball player (born 1946)

- Pitcher
- Born: November 5, 1946; Falls City, Nebraska, U.S.
- Died: June 19, 2025 (aged 78); St. Louis, Missouri, U.S.
- Batted: Right Threw: Right

MLB debut
- April 12, 1965, for the New York Mets

Last MLB appearance
- September 11, 1965, for the New York Mets

MLB statistics
- Win–loss record: 2–0
- Earned run average: 4.28
- Strikeouts: 19
- Stats at Baseball Reference

Teams
- New York Mets (1965)

James Charles Bethke (November 5, 1946 – June 19, 2025) was an American former Major League Baseball pitcher.

He was signed by the New York Mets in 1964. He only played one season in his career, which was 1965 with the Mets. His career statistics are 25 games played (all of which he entered in relief and 12 of which he finished), 19 strikeouts, a 4.28 earned run average, and a 2–0 win–loss record.

He was the youngest player in the major leagues at the time in 1965 at age 18. He died on June 19, 2025.
