= 1965 Cincinnati Reds season =

1965 Cincinnati Reds
- League: National League
- Ballpark: Crosley Field
- City: Cincinnati
- Record: 89–73 (.549)
- Owner: Bill DeWitt
- General manager: Bill DeWitt
- Manager: Dick Sisler
- Television: WLWT (Ed Kennedy, Frank McCormick)
- Radio: WCKY (Waite Hoyt, Claude Sullivan)

The 1965 Cincinnati Reds season was the 96th season for the franchise in Major League Baseball. The Reds finished in fourth place in the National League with a record of 89–73, eight games behind the NL and World Series champion Los Angeles Dodgers. The Reds were managed by Dick Sisler and played their home games at Crosley Field.

The Reds led the major leagues in most offensive categories. They recorded the most runs scored (825), hits (1,544), doubles (268), triples (61), RBI (776), batting average (.273), on-base percentage (.339) and slugging percentage (.439). They were second in home runs in the majors with 183, behind the Milwaukee Braves.

Sisler had served as acting manager during the final quarter of the previous season, and was formally promoted two weeks later.

== Regular season ==
Jim Maloney became the fourth pitcher in major league history to throw two no-hitters in one season.

=== Season standings ===
National League
Team	W	L	Pct.	GB	Home	Road
Los Angeles Dodgers	97	65	.599	—	50‍–‍31	47‍–‍34
San Francisco Giants	95	67	.586	2	51‍–‍30	44‍–‍37
Pittsburgh Pirates	90	72	.556	7	49‍–‍32	41‍–‍40
Cincinnati Reds	89	73	.549	8	49‍–‍32	40‍–‍41
Milwaukee Braves	86	76	.531	11	44‍–‍37	42‍–‍39
Philadelphia Phillies	85	76	.528	11½	45‍–‍35	40‍–‍41
St. Louis Cardinals	80	81	.497	16½	42‍–‍39	38‍–‍42
Chicago Cubs	72	90	.444	25	40‍–‍41	32‍–‍49
Houston Astros	65	97	.401	32	36‍–‍45	29‍–‍52
New York Mets	50	112	.309	47	29‍–‍52	21‍–‍60

=== Record vs. opponents ===
1965 National League record Sources:
Team	CHC	CIN	HOU	LAD	MIL	NYM	PHI	PIT	SF	STL
Chicago	—	7–11	8–10	8–10	9–9	11–7–1	8–10	5–13	6–12	10–8–1
Cincinnati	11–7	—	12–6	6–12	12–6	11–7	13–5	8–10	6–12	10–8
Houston	10–8	6–12	—	5–13	4–14	14–4	6–12	8–10	3–15	9–9
Los Angeles	10–8	12–6	13–5	—	10–8	12–6	9–9	9–9	10–8	12–6
Milwaukee	9–9	6–12	14–4	8–10	—	13–5	6–12	9–9	10–8	11–7
New York	7–11–1	7–11	4–14	6–12	5–13	—	7–11–1	4–14	5–13	5–13
Philadelphia	10–8	5–13	12–6	9–9	12–6	11–7–1	—	8–10	8–10	10–7
Pittsburgh	13–5	10–8	10–8	9–9	9–9	14–4	10–8	—	11–7–1	4–14
San Francisco	12–6	12–6	15–3	8–10	8–10	13–5	10–8	7–11–1	—	10–8
St. Louis	8–10–1	8–10	9–9	6–12	7–11	13–5	7–10	14–4	8–10	—

=== Notable transactions ===
- June 8, 1965: 1965 Major League Baseball draft
  - Bernie Carbo was drafted by the Reds in the 1st round.
  - Johnny Bench was drafted by the Reds in the 2nd round.
  - Paul Reuschel was drafted by the Reds in the 26th round, but did not sign.

=== Roster ===
1965 Cincinnati Reds
Roster
Pitchers: 35 Gerry Arrigo; 37 Roger Craig; 56 Ted Davidson; 44 Jim Duffalo; 32 Sammy Ellis; 44 Bill Henry; 30 Joey Jay; 39 Bobby Locke; 46 Jim Maloney; 42 Billy McCool; 41 Joe Nuxhall; 31 Jim O'Toole; 54 Darrell Osteen; 38 John Tsitouris; 33 Dom Zanni	Catchers: 7 Jimmie Coker; 6 Johnny Edwards; 8 Don Pavletich; Infielders: 10 Steve Boros; 16 Leo Cárdenas; 18 Gordy Coleman; 19 Tommy Helms; 11 Deron Johnson; 25 Marty Keough; 24 Tony Pérez; 14 Pete Rose; 15 Chico Ruiz	Outfielders: 17 Tommy Harper; 26 Charlie James; 28 Vada Pinson; 22 Mel Queen; 20 Frank Robinson; 12 Art Shamsky; Other batters: 23 Lee May	Manager: 2 Dick Sisler; Coaches: 5 Frank Oceak; 4 Reggie Otero; 36 Ray Shore; 3 Jim Turner

== Player stats ==
=== Batting ===
==== Starters by position ====
Note: Pos = Position; G = Games played; AB = At bats; H = Hits; Avg. = Batting average; HR = Home runs; RBI = Runs batted in

Pos	Player	G	AB	H	Avg.	HR	RBI
C	Johnny Edwards	114	371	99	.267	17	51
1B	Gordy Coleman	108	325	98	.302	14	57
2B	Pete Rose	162	670	209	.312	11	81
SS	Leo Cárdenas	156	557	160	.287	11	57
3B	Deron Johnson	159	616	177	.287	32	130
LF	Tommy Harper	159	646	166	.257	18	64
CF	Vada Pinson	159	669	204	.305	22	94
RF	Frank Robinson	156	582	172	.296	33	113

==== Other batters ====
Note: G = Games played; AB = At bats; H = Hits; Avg. = Batting average; HR = Home runs; RBI = Runs batted in

Player	G	AB	H	Avg.	HR	RBI
Tony Pérez	104	281	73	.260	12	47
Don Pavletich	68	191	61	.319	8	32
Art Shamsky	64	96	25	.260	2	10
Jimmie Coker	24	61	15	.246	2	9
Marty Keough	62	43	5	.116	0	3
Tommy Helms	21	42	16	.381	0	6
Charlie James	26	39	8	.205	0	2
Chico Ruiz	29	18	2	.111	0	1
Lee May	5	4	0	.000	0	0
Mel Queen	5	3	0	.000	0	0
Steve Boros	2	0	0	----	0	0

=== Pitching ===
==== Starting pitchers ====
Note: G = Games pitched; IP = Innings pitched; W = Wins; L = Losses; ERA = Earned run average; SO = Strikeouts

Player	G	IP	W	L	ERA	SO
Sammy Ellis	44	263.2	22	10	3.79	183
Jim Maloney	33	255.1	20	9	2.54	244
Jim O'Toole	29	127.2	3	10	5.92	71

==== Other pitchers ====
Note: G = Games pitched; IP = Innings pitched; W = Wins; L = Losses; ERA = Earned run average; SO = Strikeouts

Player	G	IP	W	L	ERA	SO
Joey Jay	37	155.2	9	8	4.22	102
Joe Nuxhall	32	148.2	11	4	3.45	117
John Tsitouris	31	131.0	6	9	4.95	91
Gerry Arrigo	27	54.0	2	4	6.17	43

==== Relief pitchers ====
Note: G = Games pitched; W = Wins; L = Losses; SV = Saves; ERA = Earned run average; SO = Strikeouts

Player	G	W	L	SV	ERA	SO
Billy McCool	62	9	10	21	4.27	120
Roger Craig	40	1	4	3	3.64	30
Ted Davidson	24	4	3	1	2.23	54
Jim Duffalo	22	0	1	0	3.45	34
Bobby Locke	11	0	1	0	5.71	8
Dom Zanni	8	0	0	0	1.35	10
Bill Henry	3	2	0	0	0.00	5
Darrell Osteen	3	0	0	0	0.00	1

== Awards and honors ==
Gold Glove Award

- Leo Cárdenas

=== All-Stars ===
All-Star Game

- Pete Rose, second baseman, starter
- Leo Cárdenas, reserve
- Johnny Edwards, reserve
- Sammy Ellis, reserve
- Frank Robinson, reserve

== Farm system ==
Level	Team	League	Manager
AAA	San Diego Padres	Pacific Coast League	Dave Bristol
AA	Knoxville Smokies	Southern League	Red Davis
A	Peninsula Grays	Carolina League	Jack Cassini and Pinky May
A	Tampa Tarpons	Florida State League	Pinky May and Jack Cassini
