= 1965 Major League Baseball season =

1965 MLB season
- League: American League (AL); National League (NL)
- Sport: Baseball
- Duration: Regular season: April 12 – October 3, 1965; World Series: October 6–14, 1965
- Games: 162
- Teams: 20 (10 per league)
- TV partner(s): NBC, CBS, ABC

Draft
- Top draft pick: Rick Monday
- Picked by: Kansas City Athletics

Regular season
- Season MVP: AL: Zoilo Versalles (MIN); NL: Willie Mays (SF)
- AL champions: Minnesota Twins
- AL runners-up: Chicago White Sox
- NL champions: Los Angeles Dodgers
- NL runners-up: San Francisco Giants

World Series
- Champions: Los Angeles Dodgers
- Runners-up: Minnesota Twins
- World Series MVP: Sandy Koufax (LAD)

MLB seasons
- ← 1964 1966 →

Locations of teams for the 1965 American League season
American League
Locations of teams for the 1965 National League season
National League

The 1965 major league baseball season began on April 12, 1965. The regular season ended on October 3, with the Los Angeles Dodgers and Minnesota Twins as the regular season champions of the National League and American League, respectively. The postseason began with Game 1 of the 62nd World Series on October 6 and ended with Game 7 on October 14. The Dodgers defeated the Twins, four games to three, capturing their fourth championship in franchise history, since their previous in 1963. Going into the season, the defending World Series champions were the St. Louis Cardinals from the 1964 season.

The 36th All-Star Game was held on July 13 at Metropolitan Stadium in Bloomington, Minnesota, home of the Minnesota Twins. The National League won, 6–5.

The Houston Colt .45s became the Houston Astros, as they moved from Colt Stadium to the new Astrodome, becoming the first team to play their home games indoors, rather than outdoors. It was also the final season for the Milwaukee Braves, before relocating to Atlanta, Georgia and becoming the Atlanta Braves for the 1966 season. The Los Angeles Angels officially changed their name to California Angels on September 2, 1965, with only 28 games left in the season, in advance of their pending 1966 move to a new stadium in Anaheim, California.

In June, the first Major League Baseball draft was held in New York City. Teams chose players in reverse order of the previous season's standings, with picks alternating between American League and National League teams. With the first pick of the 1965 MLB draft, the Kansas City Athletics took Rick Monday, an outfielder from Arizona State University.

This was Ford Frick's last season of his 14-year tenure as Commissioner of Baseball, as he resigned following the season's end on November 16. US Army LTG William Eckert was elected and took office on November 17.

== Schedule ==
The 1965 schedule consisted of 162 games for all teams in the American League and National League, each of which had 10 teams. Each team was scheduled to play 18 games against the other nine teams of their respective league. This continued the format put in place by the American League since the 1961 season and by the National League since the 1962 season, and would be used until 1969.

Opening Day took place on April 12, featuring 16 teams. The final day of the regular season was on October 3, which saw all 20 teams play. The World Series took place between October 6 and October 14.

== Rule changes ==
The 1965 season saw the following rule changes:

- The size of the catcher's mitt was regulated to be that of a leather mitt, not more than 15½ from top the bottom and not more than 38 inches in circumference.
- The 1964 rule allowing expansion teams (Houston Astros, Los Angeles Angels, New York Mets, and Washington Senators) to farm out four first-year players was ended.
- The Commissioner of Baseball had the power to veto any action by owners that were determined to be detrimental to baseball reinstated (having previously been stripped of said power following the death of commissioner Kenesaw Mountain Landis in 1944).
- If team owners disagreed with the Commissioner of Baseball, the commissioner was granted immunity from legal actions.
- In June 1965, the bonus rule was permanently rescinded, and in its place, the Rule 4 draft was introduced. This draft would take place three times per year, with the January draft intended for high-school midyear graduates, junior college players, and players who had dropped out of four-year colleges. Junior college players were required to wait until their current season was completed before they could sign. the June draft was for high-school and college graduates in spring, and a September draft for players from amateur leagues.

== Teams ==
League	Team	City	Ballpark	Capacity	Manager
American League	Baltimore Orioles	Baltimore, Maryland	Baltimore Memorial Stadium	52,184	Hank Bauer
American League	Boston Red Sox	Boston, Massachusetts	Fenway Park	33,524	Billy Herman
American League	Chicago White Sox	Chicago, Illinois	White Sox Park	46,550	Al López
American League	Cleveland Indians	Cleveland, Ohio	Cleveland Stadium	73,811	Birdie Tebbetts
American League	Detroit Tigers	Detroit, Michigan	Tiger Stadium	53,089	Bob Swift
American League	Detroit Tigers	Detroit, Michigan	Tiger Stadium	53,089	Chuck Dressen
American League	Kansas City Athletics	Kansas City, Missouri	Municipal Stadium	34,165	Mel McGaha
American League	Kansas City Athletics	Kansas City, Missouri	Municipal Stadium	34,165	Haywood Sullivan
American League	Los Angeles / California Angels	Los Angeles, California	Dodger Stadium (Note: Dodger Stadium was referred to as "Chavez Ravine Stadium" by the Angels during their tenure.)	56,000	Bill Rigney
American League	Minnesota Twins	Bloomington, Minnesota	Metropolitan Stadium	45,182	Sam Mele
American League	New York Yankees	New York, New York	Yankee Stadium	67,000	Johnny Keane
American League	Washington Senators	Washington, D.C.	District of Columbia Stadium	43,500	Gil Hodges
National League	Chicago Cubs	Chicago, Illinois	Wrigley Field	36,644	Bob Kennedy
National League	Chicago Cubs	Chicago, Illinois	Wrigley Field	36,644	Lou Klein
National League	Cincinnati Reds	Cincinnati, Ohio	Crosley Field	29,603	Dick Sisler
National League	Houston Astros	Houston, Texas	Houston Astrodome	42,217	Lum Harris
National League	Los Angeles Dodgers	Los Angeles, California	Dodger Stadium	56,000	Walter Alston
National League	Milwaukee Braves	Milwaukee, Wisconsin	Milwaukee County Stadium	43,768	Bobby Bragan
National League	New York Mets	New York, New York	Shea Stadium	55,300	Casey Stengel
National League	New York Mets	New York, New York	Shea Stadium	55,300	Wes Westrum
National League	Philadelphia Phillies	Philadelphia, Pennsylvania	Connie Mack Stadium	33,608	Gene Mauch
National League	Pittsburgh Pirates	Pittsburgh, Pennsylvania	Forbes Field	35,500	Harry Walker
National League	San Francisco Giants	San Francisco, California	Candlestick Park	42,500	Herman Franks
National League	St. Louis Cardinals	St. Louis, Missouri	Busch Stadium	30,500	Red Schoendienst

== Standings ==
=== American League ===
American League
Team	W	L	Pct.	GB	Home	Road
Minnesota Twins	102	60	.630	—	51‍–‍30	51‍–‍30
Chicago White Sox	95	67	.586	7	48‍–‍33	47‍–‍34
Baltimore Orioles	94	68	.580	8	46‍–‍33	48‍–‍35
Detroit Tigers	89	73	.549	13	47‍–‍34	42‍–‍39
Cleveland Indians	87	75	.537	15	52‍–‍30	35‍–‍45
New York Yankees	77	85	.475	25	40‍–‍43	37‍–‍42
Los Angeles / California Angels	75	87	.463	27	46‍–‍34	29‍–‍53
Washington Senators	70	92	.432	32	36‍–‍45	34‍–‍47
Boston Red Sox	62	100	.383	40	34‍–‍47	28‍–‍53
Kansas City Athletics	59	103	.364	43	33‍–‍48	26‍–‍55

=== National League ===
National League
Team	W	L	Pct.	GB	Home	Road
Los Angeles Dodgers	97	65	.599	—	50‍–‍31	47‍–‍34
San Francisco Giants	95	67	.586	2	51‍–‍30	44‍–‍37
Pittsburgh Pirates	90	72	.556	7	49‍–‍32	41‍–‍40
Cincinnati Reds	89	73	.549	8	49‍–‍32	40‍–‍41
Milwaukee Braves	86	76	.531	11	44‍–‍37	42‍–‍39
Philadelphia Phillies	85	76	.528	11½	45‍–‍35	40‍–‍41
St. Louis Cardinals	80	81	.497	16½	42‍–‍39	38‍–‍42
Chicago Cubs	72	90	.444	25	40‍–‍41	32‍–‍49
Houston Astros	65	97	.401	32	36‍–‍45	29‍–‍52
New York Mets	50	112	.309	47	29‍–‍52	21‍–‍60

=== Tie games ===
4 tie games (0 in AL, 4 in NL), which are not factored into winning percentage or games behind (and were often replayed again) occurred throughout the season.

==== National League ====
The Chicago Cubs and New York Mets had two tie games each. The Philadelphia Phillies, Pittsburgh Pirates, San Francisco Giants, and St. Louis Cardinals had one each.

- April 12, Chicago Cubs vs. St. Louis Cardinals, tied at 10 after 11 innings on account of darkness.
- May 31 (game 2), Chicago Cubs vs. New York Mets, tied at 3 after nine innings on account of darkness.
- August 25, Pittsburgh Pirates vs. San Francisco Giants, tied at 3 after nine innings on account of rain. Game rained out in the bottom of the 10th inning and the entire inning was negated. Rescheduled the following day.
- October 2 (game 2), New York Mets vs. Philadelphia Phillies, scoreless tie after 18 innings on account of curfew.

== Postseason ==
The postseason began on October 6 and ended on October 14 with the Los Angeles Dodgers defeating the Minnesota Twins in the 1965 World Series in seven games.

=== Bracket ===
World Series
AL	Minnesota Twins	3
NL	Los Angeles Dodgers	4

== Managerial changes ==
=== Off-season ===
Team	Former Manager	New Manager	Notes
Cleveland Indians	George Strickland	Birdie Tebbetts	
Detroit Tigers	Chuck Dressen	Bob Swift	Dressen replaced temporarily by Swift while recovering from a heart attack.
New York Yankees	Yogi Berra	Johnny Keane	
Pittsburgh Pirates	Danny Murtaugh	Harry Walker	
San Francisco Giants	Alvin Dark	Herman Franks	
St. Louis Cardinals	Johnny Keane	Red Schoendienst	

=== In-season ===
Team	Former Manager	New Manager
Chicago Cubs	Bob Kennedy	Lou Klein
Detroit Tigers	Bob Swift	Chuck Dressen
Kansas City Athletics	Mel McGaha	Haywood Sullivan
New York Mets	Casey Stengel	Wes Westrum

== League leaders ==
=== American League ===
Hitting leaders
Stat	Player	Total
AVG	Tony Oliva (MIN)	.321
OPS	Carl Yastrzemski (BOS)	.932
HR	Tony Conigliaro (BOS)	32
RBI	Rocky Colavito (CLE)	108
R	Zoilo Versalles (MIN)	126
H	Tony Oliva (MIN)	185
SB	Bert Campaneris (KCA)	51

Pitching leaders
Stat	Player	Total
W	Mudcat Grant (MIN)	21
L	Bill Monbouquette (BOS)	18
ERA	Sam McDowell (CLE)	2.18
K	Sam McDowell (CLE)	325
IP	Mel Stottlemyre (NYY)	291.0
SV	Ron Kline (WSH)	29
WHIP	Eddie Fisher (CWS)	0.974

Hall of Famer Sandy Koufax

=== National League ===
Hitting leaders
Stat	Player	Total
AVG	Roberto Clemente (PIT)	.329
OPS	Willie Mays (SF)	1.043
HR	Willie Mays (SF)	52
RBI	Deron Johnson (CIN)	130
R	Tommy Harper (CIN)	126
H	Pete Rose (CIN)	209
SB	Maury Wills (LAD)	94

Pitching leaders
Stat	Player	Total
W	Sandy Koufax^{1} (LAD)	26
L	Jack Fisher (NYM)	24
ERA	Sandy Koufax^{1} (LAD)	2.04
K	Sandy Koufax^{1} (LAD)	382
IP	Sandy Koufax (LAD)	335.2
SV	Ted Abernathy (CHC)	31
WHIP	Sandy Koufax (LAD)	0.855

^{1} National League Triple Crown pitching winner

== Milestones ==
=== Batters ===
==== Cycles ====
- Carl Yastrzemski (BOS):
  - Yastrzemski hit for his first cycle and 14th in franchise history, on May 14 against the Detroit Tigers.

==== Other batting accomplishments ====
- Willie Mays (SF):
  - Became the fifth player in Major League history to hit 500 home runs in the fourth inning against the Houston Astros on September 13.
- Ernie Banks (CHC):
  - Became the 11th player in Major League history to hit 400 home runs in the third inning against the St. Louis Cardinals on September 2.

=== Pitchers ===
==== Perfect games ====
- Sandy Koufax (LAD)
  - Pitched the eighth perfect game in major league history and the first in franchise history on September 9 against the Chicago Cubs. Koufax threw 113 pitches, 79 for strikes, and struck out 14 in the 1–0 victory.

==== No-hitters ====
- Jim Maloney (CIN):
  - Maloney threw his first career no-hitter and the 10th no-hitter in franchise history, by defeating the Chicago Cubs 1–0 in game one of a doubleheader on August 19. He walked 10, hit one by pitch, and struck out 12, throwing 187 pitches.
- Dave Morehead (BOS):
  - Morehead threw his first career no-hitter and the 14th no-hitter in franchise history, by defeating the Cleveland Indians 2–0 on September 16. He walked one and struck out eight.

==== Other pitching accomplishments ====
- Jim Maloney (CIN):
  - Tied a modern National League record (when including extra inning games) for most strikeouts in a single game, throwing 18 strikeouts in 11 innings in a 1–0 loss to the New York Mets on June 14.
- Chris Short (PHI):
  - Tied a modern National League record (when including extra inning games) for most strikeouts in a single game, throwing 18 strikeouts in 15 innings in an 18-inning game in a scoreless tie against the New York Mets in game two of a doubleheader on October 2.
- Sandy Koufax (LAD)
  - Set a modern Major League record by striking out 382 batters, breaking the previous modern record of 349 set by Rube Waddell.

=== Miscellaneous ===
- Chicago Cubs / Los Angeles Dodgers:
  - In Sandy Koufax's perfect game on September 9, both teams set several combined Major League records, including least combined hits in a game at one, least combined runners left on base at one, and least total base runners at two in a single game.
- Bert Campaneris (KCA):
  - Becomes the first player to play all nine positions in the same game on September 8 against the California Angels, as part of a special promotion. He begins the game at shortstop and plays, in order for the next eight innings, second base, third base, left field, center field, right field, first base, pitcher (he gives up a run on a hit and two walks) and catcher. He is replaced following a collision at the end of the ninth inning.

== Awards and honors ==
=== Regular season ===
Baseball Writers' Association of America Awards
BBWAA Award	National League	American League
Rookie of the Year	Jim Lefebvre (LAD)	Curt Blefary (BAL)
Cy Young Award	Sandy Koufax (LAD)	—
Most Valuable Player	Willie Mays (SF)	Zoilo Versalles (MIN)
Babe Ruth Award (World Series MVP)	Sandy Koufax (LAD)	—
Gold Glove Awards
Position	National League	American League
Pitcher	Bob Gibson (STL)	Jim Kaat (MIN)
Catcher	Joe Torre (MIL)	Bill Freehan (DET)
1st Base	Bill White (STL)	Joe Pepitone (NYY)
2nd Base	Bill Mazeroski (PIT)	Bobby Richardson (NYY)
3rd Base	Ron Santo (CHC)	Brooks Robinson (BAL)
Shortstop	Leo Cárdenas (CIN)	Zoilo Versalles (MIN)
Outfield	Roberto Clemente (PIT)	Al Kaline (DET)
Outfield	Curt Flood (STL)	Tom Tresh (NYY)
Outfield	Willie Mays (SF)	Carl Yastrzemski (BOS)

=== Other awards ===
- Hutch Award: Mickey Mantle (NYY)
- Sport Magazine's World Series Most Valuable Player Award: Sandy Koufax (LAD)

The Sporting News Awards
Award	National League	American League
Player of the Year	Sandy Koufax (LAD)	—
Pitcher of the Year	Sandy Koufax (LAD)	Mudcat Grant (MIN)
Fireman of the Year (Relief pitcher)	Ted Abernathy (CHC)	Eddie Fisher (CWS)
Rookie Player of the Year	Joe Morgan (HOU)	Curt Blefary (BAL)
Rookie Pitcher of the Year	Frank Linzy (SF)	Marcelino López (LAA)
Comeback Player of the Year	Vern Law (PIT)	Norm Cash (DET)
Manager of the Year	—	Sam Mele (MIN)
Executive of the Year	—	Calvin Griffith (MIN)

=== Monthly awards ===
==== Player of the Month ====
Month	National League
May	Joe Torre (MIL)
June	Vern Law (PIT); Willie Stargell (PIT)
July	Pete Rose (CIN)
August	Willie Mays (SF)

=== Baseball Hall of Fame ===
- Pud Galvin

== Home field attendance ==
Team name	Wins	%±	Home attendance	%±	Per game
Los Angeles Dodgers	97	21.3%	2,553,577	14.6%	31,526
Houston Astros	65	−1.5%	2,151,470	196.4%	26,561
New York Mets	50	−5.7%	1,768,389	2.1%	21,566
San Francisco Giants	95	5.6%	1,546,075	2.8%	19,087
Minnesota Twins	102	29.1%	1,463,258	21.2%	18,065
St. Louis Cardinals	80	−14.0%	1,241,201	8.6%	15,323
New York Yankees	77	−22.2%	1,213,552	−7.1%	14,621
Philadelphia Phillies	85	−7.6%	1,166,376	−18.2%	14,580
Chicago White Sox	95	−3.1%	1,130,519	−9.6%	13,957
Cincinnati Reds	89	−3.3%	1,047,824	21.5%	12,936
Detroit Tigers	89	4.7%	1,029,645	26.2%	12,712
Cleveland Indians	87	10.1%	934,786	43.1%	11,400
Pittsburgh Pirates	90	12.5%	909,279	19.7%	11,089
Baltimore Orioles	94	−3.1%	781,649	−30.0%	9,894
Boston Red Sox	62	−13.9%	652,201	−26.2%	8,052
Chicago Cubs	72	−5.3%	641,361	−14.7%	7,727
Los Angeles / California Angels	75	−8.5%	566,727	−25.5%	7,084
Washington Senators	70	12.9%	560,083	−6.7%	6,915
Milwaukee Braves	86	−2.3%	555,584	−39.0%	6,859
Kansas City Athletics	59	3.5%	528,344	−17.8%	6,523

== Venues ==
The Houston Colt .45s open the Houston Astrodome (and aptly rename as the Houston Astros) after playing at Colt Stadium for three seasons. The team would play at the Houston Astrodome for 35 seasons through 1999.

The Milwaukee Braves would play their final game at Milwaukee County Stadium on September 22 against the Los Angeles Dodgers, relocating to Atlanta, Georgia at Atlanta Stadium as the Atlanta Braves for the start of the 1966 season.

The California Angels would play their final two games at Dodger Stadium on September 22 in a doubleheader against the Boston Red Sox, moving into Anaheim Stadium for the start of the 1966 season.

== Media ==
=== Television ===
In 1965, ABC provided the first-ever nationwide baseball coverage with weekly Saturday broadcasts on a regional basis. ABC paid $5.7 million for the rights to the 28 Saturday/holiday Games of the Week. ABC's deal covered all of the teams except the New York Yankees and Philadelphia Phillies (who had their own television deals) and called for two regionalized games on Saturdays, Independence Day, and Labor Day. Each Saturday, ABC broadcast two 2 p.m. ET games and one game for the Pacific Time Zone at 5 p.m. ET/2 p.m local time.

Although MLB ended the Game of the Week blackouts in cities with MLB clubs, ABC blacked out the games in the home cities of the clubs playing those games.

Meanwhile, CBS continued to air its own slate of Games of the Week with the rights to individual teams, with its New York Yankees games in particular beating ABC in the ratings. At the end of the season, ABC declined to exercise its $6.5 million option for 1966, citing poor ratings, especially in New York.

Although it did not air Games of the Week this season, NBC continued to air the All-Star Game and World Series.

== Retired numbers ==
- Jim Umbricht had his No. 32 retired by the Houston Astros on April 12. This was the first number retired by the team.
- Casey Stengel had his No. 37 retired by the New York Mets on September 2. This was the first number retired by the team.
- Warren Spahn had his No. 21 retired by the Atlanta Braves on December 11. This was the first number retired by the team.

== See also ==
- 1965 in baseball (Events, Births, Deaths)
- 1965 Nippon Professional Baseball season
