= 1965 Los Angeles Dodgers season =

Major League Baseball season

1965 Los Angeles Dodgers
- World Series champions National League champions
- League: National League
- Ballpark: Dodger Stadium
- City: Los Angeles
- Record: 97–65 (.599)
- League place: 1st
- Owners: Walter O'Malley, James & Dearie Mulvey
- President: Walter O'Malley
- General managers: Buzzie Bavasi
- Managers: Walter Alston
- Television: KTTV–TV 11 (Vin Scully, Jerry Doggett)
- Radio: KFI–AM 640 (Vin Scully, Jerry Doggett); KWKW–AM 1330 (Jose Garcia, Jaime Jarrín)

The 1965 Los Angeles Dodgers season was the 76th season for the Los Angeles Dodgers franchise in Major League Baseball (MLB), their 8th season in Los Angeles, California, and their 4th season playing their home games at Dodger Stadium in Los Angeles California. The Dodgers finished the regular-season with a 97–65 record, which earned them the NL pennant by two games over their arch-rivals, the San Francisco Giants. The Dodgers went on to win the World Series in seven games over the Minnesota Twins.

== Offseason ==
- October 15, 1964: Nick Willhite was purchased from the Dodgers by the Washington Senators.
- October 15, 1964: Larry Miller was traded by the Dodgers to the New York Mets for Dick Smith.
- November 30, 1964: Doug Camilli was purchased from the Dodgers by the Washington Senators.
- December 4, 1964: Frank Howard, Phil Ortega, Pete Richert and a player to be named later were traded by the Dodgers to the Washington Senators for Claude Osteen, John Kennedy and cash. The Dodgers completed the deal by sending Dick Nen to the Senators on December 15.

== Regular season ==
=== Season recap ===
The Dodgers won the World Series in 1963, but injuries and poor play saw them fall to 6th place in 1964. Despite their weak offense and the trade of power hitting Frank Howard for Claude Osteen during the off season, they were expected to contend in 1965 with their strong pitching. However, one month into the season, they lost their best hitter Tommy Davis when he fractured his ankle sliding into second base. Most experts thought this ended any hope the Dodgers had of winning the pennant. To replace Davis, the club called up journeyman Lou Johnson; his infectious cheerful attitude and knack for timely hitting helped keep the club in contention.

The National League pennant race was a thriller, with 6 teams (the Dodgers, Giants, Pirates, Reds, Braves, and Phillies) in contention throughout a summer that saw the Dodgers, Giants, Braves, and Reds all take their turns in first place. With these 6 teams tightly bunched heading into September, the Giants went on a 14-game winning streak to take a 4 1/2-game lead with two weeks to play. Then the Dodgers went on a 13-game winning streak, and won 15 of their last 16 games to win the pennant by 2 games over the Giants.

The Dodgers were led by shortstop Maury Wills with 94 stolen bases, Sandy Koufax (26–8, 2.04 E.R.A. and a then record 382 strikeouts), and Don Drysdale (23–12, 2.77 E.R.A.) Drysdale also chipped in with 7 home runs and was the club's only .300 hitter.

=== Season standings ===
National League
Team	W	L	Pct.	GB	Home	Road
Los Angeles Dodgers	97	65	.599	—	50‍–‍31	47‍–‍34
San Francisco Giants	95	67	.586	2	51‍–‍30	44‍–‍37
Pittsburgh Pirates	90	72	.556	7	49‍–‍32	41‍–‍40
Cincinnati Reds	89	73	.549	8	49‍–‍32	40‍–‍41
Milwaukee Braves	86	76	.531	11	44‍–‍37	42‍–‍39
Philadelphia Phillies	85	76	.528	11½	45‍–‍35	40‍–‍41
St. Louis Cardinals	80	81	.497	16½	42‍–‍39	38‍–‍42
Chicago Cubs	72	90	.444	25	40‍–‍41	32‍–‍49
Houston Astros	65	97	.401	32	36‍–‍45	29‍–‍52
New York Mets	50	112	.309	47	29‍–‍52	21‍–‍60

=== Record vs. opponents ===
1965 National League record Sources:
Team	CHC	CIN	HOU	LAD	MIL	NYM	PHI	PIT	SF	STL
Chicago	—	7–11	8–10	8–10	9–9	11–7–1	8–10	5–13	6–12	10–8–1
Cincinnati	11–7	—	12–6	6–12	12–6	11–7	13–5	8–10	6–12	10–8
Houston	10–8	6–12	—	5–13	4–14	14–4	6–12	8–10	3–15	9–9
Los Angeles	10–8	12–6	13–5	—	10–8	12–6	9–9	9–9	10–8	12–6
Milwaukee	9–9	6–12	14–4	8–10	—	13–5	6–12	9–9	10–8	11–7
New York	7–11–1	7–11	4–14	6–12	5–13	—	7–11–1	4–14	5–13	5–13
Philadelphia	10–8	5–13	12–6	9–9	12–6	11–7–1	—	8–10	8–10	10–7
Pittsburgh	13–5	10–8	10–8	9–9	9–9	14–4	10–8	—	11–7–1	4–14
San Francisco	12–6	12–6	15–3	8–10	8–10	13–5	10–8	7–11–1	—	10–8
St. Louis	8–10–1	8–10	9–9	6–12	7–11	13–5	7–10	14–4	8–10	—

=== Opening Day lineup ===
Opening Day starters
Name	Position
Maury Wills	Shortstop
Wes Parker	First baseman
Willie Davis	Center fielder
Tommy Davis	Left fielder
John Roseboro	Catcher
Jim Lefebvre	Second baseman
Ron Fairly	Right fielder
John Kennedy	Third baseman
Don Drysdale	Starting pitcher

=== Notable transactions ===
- May 11, 1965: Nick Willhite was purchased by the Dodgers from the Washington Senators.
- December 15, 1965: Dick Tracewski was traded by the Dodgers to the Detroit Tigers for Phil Regan.

=== Roster ===
1965 Los Angeles Dodgers
Roster
Pitchers: 21 Jim Brewer; 53 Don Drysdale; 37 Mike Kekich; 32 Sandy Koufax; 15 Bob Miller; 23 Claude Osteen; 16 Ron Perranoski; 22 Johnny Podres; 35 John Purdin; 39 Howie Reed; 40 Bill Singer; 45 Nick Willhite	Catchers: 8 John Roseboro; 10 Jeff Torborg; 17 Héctor Valle; Infielders: 19 Jim Gilliam; 11 John Kennedy; 5 Jim Lefebvre; 31 Don LeJohn; 29 Nate Oliver; 28 Wes Parker; 44 Dick Tracewski; 14 Johnny Werhas; 30 Maury Wills	Outfielders: 43 Willie Crawford; 12 Tommy Davis; 3 Willie Davis; 6 Ron Fairly; 20 Al Ferrara; 26 Derrell Griffith; 41 Lou Johnson; 9 Wally Moon; 25 Dick Smith	Manager: 24 Walter Alston; Coaches: 19 Jim Gilliam; 18 Preston Gómez; 33 Danny Ozark; 36 Lefty Phillips

== Game log ==
=== Regular season ===
Legend
	Dodgers win
	Dodgers loss
	Postponement
	Clinched pennant
**Bold**	Dodgers team member

1965 regular season game log: 97–65 (Home: 50–31; Away: 47–34)
April: 10–5 (Home: 7–4; Away: 3–1)

#	Date	Time (PT)	Opponent	Score	Win	Loss	Save	Time of Game	Attendance	Record	Box/ Streak
1	April 12	11:00 a.m. PST	@ Mets	**W** 6–1	**Drysdale** (1–0)	Jackson (0–1)	—	2:23	37,999	1–0	W1
2	April 14	5:15 p.m. PST	@ Pirates	**W** 3–1	**Osteen** (1–0)	Gibbon (0–1)	—	1:58	7,770	2–0	W2
—	April 15	5:15 p.m. PST	@ Pirates	Postponed (rain); Makeup: July 11							
3	April 17	5:05 p.m. PST	@ Phillies	L 2–3	Short (2–0)	**Drysdale** (1–1)	Baldschun (1)	2:23	17,021	2–1	L1
4	April 18	10:35 a.m. PST	@ Phillies	**W** 6–2	**Koufax** (1–0)	Belinsky (0–1)	—	2:43	11,107	3–1	W1
5	April 20	8:00 p.m. PST	Mets	L 2–3	Spahn (1–0)	**Osteen** (1–1)	—	2:37	36,161	3–2	L1
6	April 21	8:00 p.m. PST	Mets	**W** 5–1	**Drysdale** (2–1)	Willey (0–1)	**Miller** (1)	3:09	18,134	4–2	W1
7	April 22	8:00 p.m. PST	Mets	**W** 2–1	**Koufax** (2–0)	Fisher (0–1)	—	2:12	20,888	5–2	W2
8	April 23	8:00 p.m. PST	Phillies	**W** 4–0	**Podres** (1–0)	Bunning (1–2)	—	1:58	29,120	6–2	W3
9	April 24	8:00 p.m. PST	Phillies	**W** 9–3	**Osteen** (2–1)	Belinsky (0–2)	—	2:47	36,500	7–2	W4
10	April 25	1:00 p.m. PDT	Phillies	L 4–6	Herbert (1–0)	**Drysdale** (2–2)	Baldschun (2)	2:42	25,766	7–3	L1
11	April 26	8:00 p.m. PDT	Phillies	L 3–4	Short (3–1)	**Koufax** (2–1)	Baldschun (3)	3:00	24,703	7–4	L2
12	April 27	8:00 p.m. PDT	Pirates	**W** 5–4	**Reed** (1–0)	Gibbon (0–3)	**Miller** (2)	2:54	17,630	8–4	W1
13	April 28	8:00 p.m. PDT	Pirates	L 0–2	Veale (2–0)	**Osteen** (2–2)	—	2:05	17,464	8–5	L1
14	April 29	8:00 p.m. PDT	Giants	**W** 2–1	**Drysdale** (3–2)	Marichal (3–2)	—	2:13	30,219	9–5	W1
15	April 30	8:00 p.m. PDT	Giants	**W** 6–3	**Miller** (1–0)	Bolin (0–3)	—	3:02	48,586	10–5	W2

May: 19–12 (Home: 11–8; Away: 8–4)

#	Date	Time (PT)	Opponent	Score	Win	Loss	Save	Time of Game	Attendance	Record	Box/ Streak
16	May 1	8:00 p.m. PDT	Giants	**W** 4–2	**Purdin** (1–0)	Perry (1–2)	**Brewer** (1)	2:27	49,758	11–5	W3
17	May 2	1:00 p.m. PDT	Giants	L 2–4 (10)	Sanford (2–1)	**Miller** (1–1)	Linzy (1)	2:43	40,439	11–6	L1
18	May 4	6:05 p.m. PDT	@ Reds	**W** 8–6	**Brewer** (1–0)	Jay (1–1)	—	2:30	9,767	12–6	W1
19	May 5	6:05 p.m. PDT	@ Reds	**W** 4–2	**Koufax** (3–1)	O'Toole (0–4)	—	2:38	9,753	13–6	W2
20	May 6	6:05 p.m. PDT	@ Reds	**W** 4–3	**Podres** (2–0)	Tsitouris (2–2)	**Miller** (3)	2:20	7,821	14–6	W3
21	May 7	8:15 p.m. PDT	@ Giants	**W** 4–3	**Osteen** (3–2)	Henry (2–1)	—	2:26	33,977	15–6	W4
22	May 8	1:00 p.m. PDT	@ Giants	**W** 9–0	**Drysdale** (4–2)	Herbel (1–2)	—	2:22	37,548	16–6	W5
23	May 9	1:00 p.m. PDT	@ Giants	L 3–6	Marichal (5–2)	**Koufax** (3–2)	—	2:48	40,596	16–7	L1
24	May 10	8:00 p.m. PDT	Astros	**W** 3–2 (10)	**Miller** (2–1)	Woodeshick (1–2)	—	2:44	22,535	17–7	W1
25	May 11	8:00 p.m. PDT	Astros	L 1–2	Giusti (6–0)	**Osteen** (3–3)	—	1:57	21,086	17–8	L1
26	May 12	8:00 p.m. PDT	Astros	**W** 4–2	**Drysdale** (5–2)	Nottebart (0–2)	—	2:06	19,302	18–8	W1
27	May 13	8:00 p.m. PDT	Astros	**W** 3–0	**Koufax** (4–2)	Bruce (1–4)	—	2:05	20,963	19–8	W2
28	May 14	8:00 p.m. PDT	Cubs	L 1–2	Buhl (4–2)	**Purdin** (1–1)	Abernathy (8)	2:23	26,356	19–9	L1
29	May 15	1:00 p.m. PDT	Cubs	**W** 3–1	**Miller** (3–1)	Ellsworth (3–3)	**Brewer** (2)	2:02	22,047	20–9	W1
30 (1)	May 16	1:00 p.m. PDT	Cubs	L 3–5 (10)	Jackson (3–3)	**Perranoski** (0–1)	—	2:38	—	20–10	L1
31 (2)	May 16	4:13 p.m. PDT	Cubs	**W** 3–2	**Drysdale** (6–2)	McDaniel (0–1)	—	2:22	45,739	21–10	W1
32	May 17	5:30 p.m. PDT	@ Astros	**W** 5–3 (11)	**Koufax** (5–2)	Bruce (1–5)	**Miller** (4)	2:59	40,858	22–10	W2
33	May 18	5:30 p.m. PDT	@ Astros	L 1–4	Johnson (3–1)	**Brewer** (1–1)	Woodeshick (2)	2:07	22,220	22–11	L1
34	May 19	5:30 p.m. PDT	@ Astros	**W** 4–2 (14)	**Purdin** (2–1)	MacKenzie (0–2)	**Drysdale** (1)	4:04	30,885	23–11	W1
35	May 21	11:30 a.m. PDT	@ Cubs	L 3–4	Ellsworth (4–3)	**Drysdale** (6–3)	—	2:22	4,716	23–12	L1
36	May 22	11:30 a.m. PDT	@ Cubs	**W** 3–1	**Koufax** (6–2)	Koonce (3–2)	—	2:30	17,922	24–12	W1
37	May 23	11:30 a.m. PDT	@ Cubs	L 2–3 (16)	Ellsworth (5–3)	**Reed** (1–1)	—	4:09	17,139	24–13	L1
38	May 24	8:00 p.m. PDT	Cardinals	L 4–6	Stallard (3–1)	**Osteen** (3–4)	Schultz (1)	3:11	22,987	24–14	L2
39	May 25	8:00 p.m. PDT	Cardinals	**W** 2–0	**Drysdale** (7–3)	Gibson (8–1)	—	1:41	28,515	25–14	W1
40	May 26	8:00 p.m. PDT	Cardinals	L 1–2	Simmons (3–5)	**Koufax** (6–3)	—	2:26	30,794	25–15	L1
41	May 27	8:00 p.m. PDT	Braves	**W** 3–2	**Podres** (3–0)	Lemaster (2–5)	—	2:02	19,001	26–15	W1
42	May 28	8:00 p.m. PDT	Braves	L 4–5	O'Dell (3–2)	**Osteen** (3–5)	—	2:20	30,107	26–16	L1
43	May 29	2:15 p.m. PDT	Braves	**W** 5–3	**Drysdale** (8–3)	Carroll (0–1)	—	2:28	23,707	27–16	W1
44	May 30	1:00 p.m. PDT	Reds	**W** 12–5	**Koufax** (7–3)	Ellis (7–2)	—	2:43	36,309	28–16	W2
45 (1)	May 31	1:00 p.m. PDT	Reds	**W** 4–3	**Perranoski** (1–1)	Maloney (5–1)	—	2:44	—	29–16	W3
46 (2)	May 31	4:19 p.m. PDT	Reds	L 1–6	Jay (3–1)	**Osteen** (3–6)	—	2:14	50,997	29–17	L1

June: 17–14 (Home: 6–7; Away: 11–7)

#	Date	Time (PT)	Opponent	Score	Win	Loss	Save	Time of Game	Attendance	Record	Box/ Streak
47	June 2	6:00 p.m. PDT	@ Cardinals	**W** 4–1	**Drysdale** (9–3)	Washburn (3–3)	**Perranoski** (1)	2:46	17,560	30–17	W1
48	June 3	6:00 p.m. PDT	@ Cardinals	**W** 11–10	**Brewer** (2–1)	Schultz (1–1)	**Miller** (5)	3:19	19,946	31–17	W2
49	June 4	6:00 p.m. PDT	@ Braves	L 2–5	Blasingame (6–4)	**Miller** (3–2)	—	2:50	5,760	31–18	L1
50	June 5	11:30 a.m. PDT	@ Braves	L 1–9	Cloninger (7–4)	**Podres** (3–1)	—	2:20	4,116	31–19	L2
51 (1)	June 6	11:00 a.m. PDT	@ Braves	**W** 4–0	**Drysdale** (10–3)	Kelley (0–1)	—	2:20	—	32–19	W1
52 (2)	June 6	1:50 p.m. PDT	@ Braves	L 4–5	Lemaster (3–5)	**Reed** (1–2)	O'Dell (6)	2:35	17,175	32–20	L1
53	June 7	5:05 p.m. PDT	@ Phillies	**W** 14–3	**Koufax** (8–3)	Burdette (0–3)	—	3:02	23,345	33–20	W1
54	June 8	5:05 p.m. PDT	@ Phillies	**W** 2–1	**Osteen** (4–6)	Bunning (5–5)	**Perranoski** (2)	2:49	14,975	34–20	W2
55	June 9	5:05 p.m. PDT	@ Phillies	L 3–7	Short (5–6)	**Kekich** (0–1)	—	3:01	16,241	34–21	L1
56	June 10	5:05 p.m. PDT	@ Phillies	L 0–4	Herbert (3–3)	**Podres** (3–2)	—	1:58	19,467	34–22	L2
57	June 11	5:00 p.m. PDT	@ Mets	**W** 2–1	**Drysdale** (11–3)	Spahn (4–7)	—	2:16	55,023	35–22	W1
58	June 12	11:15 a.m. PDT	@ Mets	**W** 5–0	**Koufax** (9–3)	Jackson (2–8)	—	2:50	38,915	36–22	W2
59 (1)	June 13	10:00 a.m. PDT	@ Mets	**W** 5–2	**Osteen** (5–6)	Fisher (5–6)	**Miller** (6)	2:41	—	37–22	W3
60 (2)	June 13	1:16 p.m. PDT	@ Mets	**W** 4–3	**Perranoski** (2–1)	Kroll (3–5)	**Podres** (1)	3:25	57,175	38–22	W4
61	June 15	8:00 p.m. PDT	Giants	L 1–2	Marichal (10–5)	**Drysdale** (11–4)	—	2:16	52,357	38–23	L1
62	June 16	8:00 p.m. PDT	Giants	**W** 2–1	**Koufax** (10–3)	Shaw (6–4)	—	2:36	44,499	39–23	W1
63	June 17	8:00 p.m. PDT	Giants	**W** 3–0	**Osteen** (6–6)	Perry (6–6)	—	2:24	40,707	40–23	W2
64	June 18	8:00 p.m. PDT	Phillies	L 2–4	Short (7–6)	**Podres** (3–3)	—	2:23	30,401	40–24	L1
65	June 19	8:00 p.m. PDT	Phillies	**W** 4–0	**Willhite** (1–0)	Herbert (3–4)	**Perranoski** (3)	2:19	20,518	41–24	W1
66 (1)	June 20	1:00 p.m. PDT	Mets	**W** 2–1	**Koufax** (11–3)	Spahn (4–9)	—	1:52	—	42–24	W2
67 (2)	June 20	3:27 p.m. PDT	Mets	L 2–3	Miller (1–0)	**Drysdale** (11–5)	—	2:30	52,248	42–25	L1
68	June 21	8:00 p.m. PDT	Mets	L 0–1	Jackson (3–9)	**Osteen** (6–7)	—	1:54	18,867	42–26	L2
69	June 22	8:00 p.m. PDT	Mets	**W** 4–2	**Reed** (2–2)	Parsons (0–4)	**Perranoski** (4)	2:18	20,633	43–26	W1
70	June 24	8:00 p.m. PDT	Pirates	L 3–13	Cardwell (5–2)	**Drysdale** (11–6)	—	2:33	28,867	43–27	L1
71	June 25	8:00 p.m. PDT	Pirates	**W** 4–1	**Koufax** (12–3)	Friend (3–6)	—	2:04	32,060	44–27	W1
72	June 26	1:00 p.m. PDT	Pirates	L 1–6	Law (8–5)	**Osteen** (6–8)	—	2:28	21,769	44–28	L1
73	June 27	1:00 p.m. PDT	Pirates	L 2–10	Veale (8–5)	**Podres** (3–4)	—	2:39	33,161	44–29	L2
74	June 28	8:15 p.m. PDT	@ Giants	L 0–5	Marichal (12–6)	**Drysdale** (11–7)	—	2:38	36,702	44–30	L3
75	June 29	1:00 p.m. PDT	@ Giants	**W** 9–3	**Koufax** (13–3)	Shaw (7–5)	—	2:45	29,380	45–30	W1
76 (1)	June 30	11:00 a.m. PDT	@ Cubs	L 1–4	Ellsworth (9–3)	**Osteen** (6–9)	—	2:03	—	45–31	L1
77 (2)	June 30	1:38 p.m. PDT	@ Cubs	**W** 4–3	**Miller** (4–2)	Hoeft (0–1)	—	2:38	17,950	46–31	W1

July: 15–13 (Home: 9–5; Away: 6–8)

#	Date	Time (PT)	Opponent	Score	Win	Loss	Save	Time of Game	Attendance	Record	Box/ Streak
78	July 1	11:30 a.m. PDT	@ Cubs	L 3–6	McDaniel (3–3)	**Podres** (3–5)	Abernathy (16)	2:34	7,420	46–32	L1
79	July 2	5:30 p.m. PDT	@ Astros	L 3–4	Cuellar (1–1)	**Drysdale** (11–8)	—	2:35	33,044	46–33	L2
80	July 3	5:30 p.m. PDT	@ Astros	**W** 3–1	**Koufax** (14–3)	Dierker (2–4)	—	2:10	50,136	47–33	W1
81	July 4	12:30 p.m. PDT	@ Astros	L 1–3	Raymond (5–3)	**Osteen** (6–10)	—	2:04	47,642	47–34	L1
82	July 5	6:05 p.m. PDT	@ Reds	L 4–7	Maloney (9–4)	**Miller** (4–3)	McCool (8)	2:29	29,047	47–35	L1
83	July 6	6:05 p.m. PDT	@ Reds	**W** 11–7	**Drysdale** (12–8)	O'Toole (1–8)	**Perranoski** (5)	2:54	18,833	48–35	W1
84	July 7	6:05 p.m. PDT	@ Reds	L 6–7	Nuxhall (4–2)	**Miller** (4–4)	—	2:58	25,785	48–36	L1
85	July 8	4:30 p.m. PDT	@ Pirates	**W** 9–4	**Reed** (3–2)	Law (8–8)	—	2:59	22,247	49–36	W1
86	July 9	5:15 p.m. PDT	@ Pirates	L 1–4	Veale (9–6)	**Willhite** (1–1)	—	2:29	16,284	49–37	L1
87	July 10	11:15 a.m. PDT	@ Pirates	**W** 8–4	**Drysdale** (13–8)	Cardwell (8–3)	**Perranoski** (6)	2:57	14,880	50–37	W1
88 (1)	July 11	10:00 a.m. PDT	@ Pirates	**W** 4–2	**Koufax** (15–3)	Gibbon (2–8)	—	2:29	—	51–37	W2
89 (2)	July 11	1:04 p.m. PDT	@ Pirates	L 3–4 (10)	Carpin (3–0)	**Miller** (4–5)	—	2:42	37,631	51–38	L1
—	July 13	11:00 a.m. PDT	36th All-Star Game	National League vs.American League (Metropolitan Stadium, Bloomington, Minnesota)							
90	July 15	8:00 p.m. PDT	Cubs	**W** 5–0	**Drysdale** (14–8)	Ellsworth (10–5)	—	2:19	25,538	52–38	W1
91	July 16	8:00 p.m. PDT	Cubs	**W** 3–0	**Koufax** (16–3)	Jackson (8–11)	—	2:20	47,947	53–38	W2
92	July 17	8:00 p.m. PDT	Cubs	**W** 7–2	**Osteen** (7–10)	Koonce (7–8)	—	2:21	31,228	54–38	W3
93	July 18	1:00 p.m. PDT	Cubs	**W** 4–3 (11)	**Reed** (4–2)	Hendley (0–2)	—	3:05	27,508	55–38	W4
94	July 19	8:00 p.m. PDT	Astros	**W** 8–3	**Drysdale** (15–8)	Nottebart (1–7)	—	2:34	22,756	56–38	W5
95	July 20	8:00 p.m. PDT	Astros	**W** 3–2	**Koufax** (17–3)	Taylor (2–4)	—	2:15	30,937	57–38	W6
96	July 21	8:00 p.m. PDT	Braves	L 4–6	Blasingame (11–7)	**Osteen** (7–11)	O'Dell (10)	3:05	28,721	57–39	L1
97	July 22	8:00 p.m. PDT	Braves	L 2–5	Cloninger (12–8)	**Miller** (4–6)	O'Dell (11)	2:24	27,179	57–40	L2
98	July 23	8:00 p.m. PDT	Cardinals	L 3–4 (12)	Washburn (6–7)	**Willhite** (1–2)	—	3:48	40,286	57–41	L3
99	July 24	8:00 p.m. PDT	Cardinals	L 2–3 (10)	Dennis (2–1)	**Perranoski** (2–2)	Woodeshick (12)	3:04	48,998	57–42	L4
100	July 25	1:00 p.m. PDT	Cardinals	**W** 5–1	**Osteen** (8–11)	Simmons (6–10)	—	2:44	31,710	58–42	W1
101	July 26	8:00 p.m. PDT	Reds	**W** 5–4	**Podres** (4–5)	Maloney (11–5)	**Perranoski** (7)	2:20	39,978	59–42	W2
102	July 27	8:00 p.m. PDT	Reds	**W** 9–7	**Perranoski** (3–2)	Jay (8–3)	—	3:25	46,537	60–42	W3
103	July 28	8:00 p.m. PDT	Reds	L 1–4	Ellis (14–6)	**Koufax** (17–4)	—	2:00	53,604	60–43	L1
104	July 30	6:00 p.m. PDT	@ Cardinals	**W** 4–2	**Miller** (5–6)	Dennis (2–2)	**Perranoski** (8)	2:39	29,497	61–43	W1
105	July 31	6:00 p.m. PDT	@ Cardinals	L 3–4	Gibson (13–8)	**Perranoski** (3–3)	—	2:31	30,109	61–44	L1

August: 14–13 (Home: 5–3; Away: 9–10)

#	Date	Time (PT)	Opponent	Score	Win	Loss	Save	Time of Game	Attendance	Record	Box/ Streak
106	August 1	11:15 a.m. PDT	@ Cardinals	**W** 3–2	**Koufax** (18–4)	Sadecki (2–9)	—	2:29	30,605	62–44	W1
107	August 2	6:00 p.m. PDT	@ Cardinals	L 5–6	Stallard (8–4)	**Perranoski** (3–4)	Dennis (6)	2:34	20,518	62–45	L1
—	August 3	5:30 p.m. PDT	@ Braves	Postponed (inclement weather); Makeup: August 4							
108 (1)	August 4	4:00 p.m. PDT	@ Braves	L 3–4	Fischer (5–5)	**Drysdale** (15–9)	O'Dell (15)	2:44	—	62–46	L2
109 (2)	August 4	7:14 p.m. PDT	@ Braves	**W** 3–2	**Osteen** (9–11)	Lemaster (4–9)	**Miller** (7)	2:25	19,950	63–46	W1
110	August 5	5:30 p.m. PDT	@ Braves	**W** 6–3	**Koufax** (19–4)	Blasingame (13–8)	—	2:46	18,368	64–46	W2
111	August 6	6:05 p.m. PDT	@ Reds	L 4–5 (11)	McCool (7–6)	**Perranoski** (3–5)	—	3:26	25,668	64–47	L1
112	August 7	5:05 p.m. PDT	@ Reds	**W** 5–3	**Reed** (5–2)	Ellis (14–7)	**Perranoski** (9)	2:37	27,844	65–47	W1
113	August 8	10:30 a.m. PDT	@ Reds	L 0–18	Maloney (13–5)	**Drysdale** (15–10)	—	2:20	28,335	65–48	L1
114	August 10	8:00 p.m. PDT	Mets	**W** 4–3	**Koufax** (20–4)	Jackson (5–16)	—	2:07	36,815	66–48	W1
115	August 11	8:00 p.m. PDT	Mets	**W** 1–0	**Drysdale** (16–10)	Richardson (0–1)	—	2:34	23,376	67–48	W2
116	August 13	8:00 p.m. PDT	Pirates	**W** 3–1	**Osteen** (10–11)	Veale (12–9)	—	2:21	32,551	68–48	W3
117	August 14	8:00 p.m. PDT	Pirates	**W** 1–0 (10)	**Koufax** (21–4)	Cardwell (10–7)	—	2:43	29,237	69–48	W4
118	August 15	1:00 p.m. PDT	Pirates	L 2–4	Sisk (4–2)	**Drysdale** (16–11)	McBean (13)	3:02	25,175	69–49	L1
119	August 16	8:00 p.m. PDT	Phillies	L 1–6	Short (14–8)	**Podres** (4–6)	—	2:47	22,611	69–50	L2
120	August 17	8:00 p.m. PDT	Phillies	**W** 4–2	**Osteen** (11–11)	Herbert (5–6)	**Perranoski** (10)	2:31	23,144	70–50	W1
121	August 18	8:00 p.m. PDT	Phillies	L 3–6 (12)	Wagner (5–3)	**Brewer** (2–2)	—	4:05	38,267	70–51	L1
122	August 19	8:15 p.m. PDT	@ Giants	**W** 8–5 (15)	**Perranoski** (4–5)	Perry (8–11)	—	4:11	35,901	71–51	W1
123	August 20	8:15 p.m. PDT	@ Giants	**W** 5–1	Shaw (14–6)	**Reed** (5–3)	—	2:38	41,858	71–52	L1
124	August 21	1:00 p.m. PDT	@ Giants	**W** 6–4 (11)	**Podres** (5–6)	Henry (3–2)	—	3:27	42,283	72–52	W1
125	August 22	1:00 p.m. PDT	@ Giants	L 3–4	Herbel (8–6)	**Koufax** (21–5)	Murakami (5)	2:18	42,807	72–53	L1
126	August 23	5:00 p.m. PDT	@ Mets	**W** 8–4	**Drysdale** (17–11)	Miller (1–3)	**Miller** (8)	2:59	33,393	73–53	W1
127	August 24	5:00 p.m. PDT	@ Mets	L 3–4	Eilers (1–0)	**Miller** (5–7)	—	2:34	37,023	73–54	L1
128	August 25	5:00 p.m. PDT	@ Mets	L 5–7	Richardson (2–1)	**Osteen** (11–12)	—	2:38	32,432	73–55	L2
129	August 26	5:00 p.m. PDT	@ Mets	L 2–5	McGraw (2–2)	**Koufax** (21–6)	Fisher (1)	2:24	45,950	73–56	L3
130	August 27	5:05 p.m. PDT	@ Phillies	**W** 9–8	**Drysdale** (18–11)	Herbert (5–7)	**Reed** (1)	3:16	26,740	74–56	W1
131	August 28	5:05 p.m. PDT	@ Phillies	**W** 8–4	**Brewer** (3–2)	Short (14–9)	**Koufax** (1)	3:16	27,439	75–56	W2
132	August 29	10:35 a.m. PDT	@ Phillies	L 3–13	Culp (9–9)	**Osteen** (11–13)	—	2:39	21,744	75–57	L1
—	August 31	5:15 p.m. PDT	@ Pirates	Postponed (rain); Makeup: September 1							

September: 20–7 (Home: 10–3; Away: 10–4)

#	Date	Time (PT)	Opponent	Score	Win	Loss	Save	Time of Game	Attendance	Record	Box/ Streak
133 (1)	September 1	2:30 p.m. PDT	@ Pirates	L 2–3 (11)	Gibbon (4–9)	**Koufax** (21–7)	—	3:00	—	75–58	L2
134 (2)	September 1	6:05 p.m. PDT	@ Pirates	L 1–2	Law (16–9)	**Drysdale** (18–12)	—	2:18	26,394	75–59	L3
135	September 2	5:15 p.m. PDT	@ Pirates	**W** 7–1	**Osteen** (12–13)	Veale (14–10)	**Perranoski** (11)	2:38	29,200	76–59	W1
136	September 3	5:30 p.m. PDT	@ Astros	**W** 3–0	**Willhite** (2–2)	Nottebart (4–13)	**Perranoski** (12)	2:14	31,154	77–59	W2
137	September 4	11:15 a.m. PDT	@ Astros	**W** 5–0	**Podres** (6–6)	Bruce (9–17)	**Perranoski** (13)	2:13	41,951	78–59	W3
138	September 5	12:30 p.m. PDT	@ Astros	**W** 4–2	**Reed** (4–2)	Roberts (4–1)	—	2:05	49,442	79–59	W4
139	September 6	1:00 p.m. PDT	Giants	L 6–7 (12)	Linzy (7–2)	**Reed** (6–4)	—	3:43	53,581	79–60	L1
140	September 7	6:00 p.m. PDT	Giants	L 1–3	Shaw (15–8)	**Osteen** (12–14)	Murakami (7)	2:48	48,586	79–61	L2
141	September 9	8:00 p.m. PDT	Cubs	**W** 1–0	**Koufax** (22–7)	Hendley (2–3)	—	1:43	29,139	80–61	W1
142	September 10	8:00 p.m. PDT	Astros	**W** 5–2	**Drysdale** (19–12)	Roberts (4–2)	**Perranoski** (14)	2:00	30,200	81–61	W2
143	September 11	8:00 p.m. PDT	Astros	**W** 8–3	**Osteen** (13–14)	Farrell (10–10)	**Perranoski** (15)	2:32	30,278	82–61	W3
144	September 12	1:00 p.m. PDT	Astros	L 2–3	Owens (6–4)	**Perranoski** (4–6)	Raymond (4)	2:40	21,918	82–62	L1
145	September 14	11:30 a.m. PDT	@ Cubs	L 1–2	Hendley (3–3)	**Koufax** (22–8)	—	1:57	6,220	82–63	L2
146	September 15	11:30 a.m. PDT	@ Cubs	L 6–8	Ellsworth (14–14)	**Reed** (6–5)	Hoeft (1)	2:45	1,886	82–64	L3
147	September 16	11:30 a.m. PDT	@ Cubs	**W** 2–0	**Osteen** (14–14)	Faul (5–5)	**Koufax** (2)	2:15	550	83–64	W1
148	September 17	6:00 p.m. PDT	@ Cardinals	**W** 3–2	**Drysdale** (20–12)	Simmons (9–15)	**Perranoski** (16)	2:36	19,042	84–64	W2
149	September 18	6:00 p.m. PDT	@ Cardinals	**W** 1–0	**Koufax** (23–8)	Washburn (9–11)	—	2:11	29,063	85–64	W3
150	September 19	11:15 a.m. PDT	@ Cardinals	**W** 5–0	**Osteen** (15–14)	Gibson (18–11)	**Perranoski** (17)	2:33	23,941	86–64	W4
151	September 21	5:30 p.m. PDT	@ Braves	**W** 3–1	**Drysdale** (21–12)	Lemaster (6–13)	—	2:30	5,169	87–64	W5
152	September 22	6:00 p.m. PDT	@ Braves	**W** 7–6 (11)}	**Perranoski** (5–6)	Olivo (0–1)	**Miller** (9)	3:38	12,577	88–64	W6
153	September 24	8:00 p.m. PDT	Cardinals	**W** 4–3	**Perranoski** (6–6)	Gibson (18–12)	—	2:38	37,450	89–64	W7
154	September 25	1:00 p.m. PDT	Cardinals	**W** 2–0	**Koufax** (24–8)	Briles (2–3)	—	2:10	31,532	90–64	W8
155	September 26	1:00 p.m. PDT	Cardinals	**W** 1–0	**Drysdale** (22–12)	Sadecki (6–14)	—	2:18	40,317	91–64	W9
156	September 27	8:00 p.m. PDT	Reds	**W** 6–1	**Podres** (7–6)	Ellis (21–10)	**Perranoski** (18)	2:31	32,593	92–64	W10
157	September 28	8:00 p.m. PDT	Reds	**W** 2–1 (12)	**Reed** (7–5)	Jay (9–8)	—	3:52	38,424	93–64	W11
158	September 29	6:00 p.m. PDT	Reds	**W** 5–0	**Koufax** (25–8)	Maloney (20–9)	—	2:20	52,312	94–64	W12
159	September 30	8:00 p.m. PDT	Braves	**W** 4–0	**Drysdale** (23–12)	Fischer (8–9)	—	2:18	36,006	95–64	W13

October: 2–1 (Home: 2–1; Away: 0–0)

#	Date	Time (PT)	Opponent	Score	Win	Loss	Save	Time of Game	Attendance	Record	Box/ Streak
160	October 1	8:00 p.m. PDT	Braves	L 0–2	Lemaster (7–13)	**Osteen** (15–15)	—	2:19	50,813	95–65	L1
161	October 2	2:15 p.m. PDT	Braves	**W** 3–1	**Koufax** (26–8)	Cloninger (24–11)	—	2:42	41,574	96–65	W1
162	October 3	1:00 p.m. PDT	Braves	**W** 3–0	**Miller** (6–7)	Sadowski (5–9)	**Willhite** (1)	2:01	39,922	97–65	W2

=== Detailed records ===
**National League**
Opponent	Home	Away	Total	Pct.	Runs scored	Runs allowed
Chicago Cubs	7–2	3–6	10–8	.556	55	46
Cincinnati Reds	7–2	5–4	12–6	.667	91	89
Houston Astros	7–2	6–3	13–5	.722	66	38
**Los Angeles Dodgers**	—	—	—	—	—	—
Milwaukee Braves	5–4	5–4	10–8	.556	61	60
New York Mets	6–3	6–3	12–6	.667	62	42
Philadelphia Phillies	4–5	5–4	9–9	.500	81	76
Pittsburgh Pirates	4–5	5–4	9–9	.500	59	66
San Francisco Giants	5–4	5–4	10–8	.556	70	58
St. Louis Cardinals	6–3	6–3	12–6	.667	91	66
	**50–31**	**47–34**	**97–65**	**.599**	**608**	**521**

==== Month-by-Month ====
Month	Games	Won	Lost	Win %	RS	RA
April	15	10	5	0.667	59	35
May	31	19	12	0.613	113	91
June	31	17	14	0.548	105	111
July	28	15	13	0.536	124	103
August	27	14	13	0.519	104	128
September	27	20	7	0.741	97	50
October	3	2	1	0.667	6	3
Total	162	97	65	0.599	608	521

	Games	Won	Lost	Win %	RS	RA
Home	81	50	31	0.617	268	218
Road	81	47	34	0.580	340	303
Total	162	97	65	0.599	608	521

=== Composite Box ===
1965 Los Angeles Dodgers Inning–by–Inning Boxscore
Team	1	2	3	4	5	6	7	8	9	10	11	12	13	14	15	16	R	H	E
Opponents	68	56	56	47	64	61	50	62	39	8	4	5	0	0	0	1	521	1223	155
Dodgers	84	62	56	70	71	66	75	57	49	4	8	1	0	2	3	0	608	1329	134

=== Postseason Game log ===
1965 Postseason game log: 4–3 (Home: 3–0; Away: 1–3)
World Series vs. Minnesota Twins 4–3 (Home: 3–0; Away: 1–3)

#	Date	Time (PT)	Opponent	Score	Win	Loss	Save	Time of Game	Attendance	Series	Box/ Streak
1	October 6	12 Noon PDT	@ Twins	2–8	Grant (1–0)	**Drysdale** (0–1)	—	2:29	47,797	MIN 1–0	L1
2	October 7	12 Noon PDT	@ Twins	1–5	Kaat (1–0)	**Koufax** (0–1)	—	2:13	48,700	MIN 2–0	L2
3	October 9	1:00 p.m. PDT	Twins	4–0	**Osteen** (1–0)	Pascual (0–1)	—	2:06	55,934	MIN 2–1	W1
4	October 10	1:00 p.m. PDT	Twins	7–2	**Drysdale** (1–1)	Grant (1–1)	—	2:15	55,920	TIE 2–2	W2
5	October 11	1:00 p.m. PDT	Twins	7–0	**Koufax** (1–1)	Kaat (1–1)	—	2:34	55,801	LAN 3–2	W3
6	October 13	12 Noon PDT	@ Twins	1–5	Grant (2–1)	**Osteen** (1–1)	—	2:16	49,578	TIE 3–3	L1
7	October 14	12 Noon PDT	@ Twins	2–0	**Koufax** (2–1)	Kaat (1–2)	—	2:27	50,976	LAN 4–3	W1

== Starting Lineups ==
=== Regular Season ===
==== Batting Order ====
1965 Regular Season Batting Order game log
April

#	Date	Opponent	1st	2nd	3rd	4th	5th	6th	7th	8th	9th
14	April 29	SF									#53; Drysdale (SP)
15	April 30	SF									#32; Koufax (SP)

May

#	Date	Opponent	1st	2nd	3rd	4th	5th	6th	7th	8th	9th
16	May 1	SF									#22; Podres (SP)
17	May 2	SF									#23; Osteen (SP)
21	May 7	@ SF									#23; Osteen (SP)
22	May 8	@ SF									#53; Drysdale (SP)
23	May 9	@ SF									#32; Koufax (SP)

June

#	Date	Opponent	1st	2nd	3rd	4th	5th	6th	7th	8th	9th
61	June 15	SF									#53; Drysdale (SP)
62	June 16	SF									#32; Koufax (SP)
63	June 17	SF									#23; Osteen (SP)
74	June 28	@ SF									#53; Drysdale (SP)
75	June 29	@ SF									#32; Koufax (SP)

July

#	Date	Opponent	1st	2nd	3rd	4th	5th	6th	7th	8th	9th

August

#	Date	Opponent	1st	2nd	3rd	4th	5th	6th	7th	8th	9th
122	August 19	@ SF									#53; Drysdale (SP)
123	August 20	@ SF									#39; Reed (SP)
124	August 21	@ SF									#23; Osteen (SP)
125	August 22	@ SF									#32; Koufax (SP)

September

#	Date	Opponent	1st	2nd	3rd	4th	5th	6th	7th	8th	9th
139	September 6	SF									#53; Drysdale (SP)
140	September 7	SF									#23; Osteen (SP)

October

#	Date	Opponent	1st	2nd	3rd	4th	5th	6th	7th	8th	9th

==== Defensive Lineup ====
1965 Regular Season Defensive Lineup game log
April

#	Date	Opponent	C	1B	2B	3B	SS	LF	CF	RF	P
14	April 29	SF									#53; Drysdale
15	April 30	SF									#32; Koufax

May

#	Date	Opponent	C	1B	2B	3B	SS	LF	CF	RF	P
16	May 1	SF									#22; Podres
17	May 2	SF									#23; Osteen
21	May 7	@ SF									#23; Osteen
22	May 8	@ SF									#53; Drysdale
23	May 9	@ SF									#32; Koufax

June

#	Date	Opponent	C	1B	2B	3B	SS	LF	CF	RF	P
61	June 15	SF									#53; Drysdale
62	June 16	SF									#32; Koufax
63	June 17	SF									#23; Osteen
74	June 28	@ SF									#53; Drysdale
75	June 29	@ SF									#32; Koufax

July

#	Date	Opponent	C	1B	2B	3B	SS	LF	CF	RF	P

August

#	Date	Opponent	C	1B	2B	3B	SS	LF	CF	RF	P
122	August 19	@ SF									#53; Drysdale
123	August 20	@ SF									#39; Reed
124	August 21	@ SF									#23; Osteen
125	August 22	@ SF									#32; Koufax

September

#	Date	Opponent	C	1B	2B	3B	SS	LF	CF	RF	P
139	September 6	SF									#53; Drysdale
140	September 7	SF									#23; Osteen

October

#	Date	Opponent	C	1B	2B	3B	SS	LF	CF	RF	P

=== World Series ===
==== Batting Order ====
1965 Postseason Batting Order game log
World Series: vs. Minnesota Twins

#	Date	Opponent	1st	2nd	3rd	4th	5th	6th	7th	8th	9th
1	October 6	@ MIN	#30; Wills (SS)	#19; Gilliam (3B)	#3; W. Davis (CF)	#6; Fairly (RF)	#41; Johnson (LF)	#5; Lefebvre (2B)	#28; Parker (1B)	#8; Roseboro (C)	#53; Drysdale (SP)
2	October 7	@ MIN	#30; Wills (SS)	#19; Gilliam (3B)	#3; W. Davis (CF)	#41; Johnson (LF)	#6; Fairly (RF)	#5; Lefebvre (2B)	#28; Parker (1B)	#8; Roseboro (C)	#32; Koufax (SP)
3	October 9	MIN	#30; Wills (SS)	#19; Gilliam (3B)	#3; W. Davis (CF)	#6; Fairly (RF)	#41; Johnson (LF)	#5; Lefebvre (2B)	#28; Parker (1B)	#8; Roseboro (C)	#23; Osteen (SP)
4	October 10	MIN	#30; Wills (SS)	#19; Gilliam (3B)	#3; W. Davis (CF)	#6; Fairly (RF)	#41; Johnson (LF)	#28; Parker (1B)	#8; Roseboro (C)	#44; Tracewski (2B)	#53; Drysdale (SP)
5	October 11	MIN	#30; Wills (SS)	#19; Gilliam (3B)	#3; W. Davis (CF)	#41; Johnson (LF)	#6; Fairly (RF)	#28; Parker (1B)	#44; Tracewski (2B)	#8; Roseboro (C)	#32; Koufax (SP)
6	October 13	@ MIN	#30; Wills (SS)	#19; Gilliam (3B)	#3; W. Davis (CF)	#6; Fairly (RF)	#41; Johnson (LF)	#28; Parker (1B)	#8; Roseboro (C)	#44; Tracewski (2B)	#23; Osteen (SP)
7	October 14	@ MIN	#30; Wills (SS)	#19; Gilliam (3B)	#3; W. Davis (CF)	#41; Johnson (LF)	#6; Fairly (RF)	#28; Parker (1B)	#44; Tracewski (2B)	#8; Roseboro (C)	#32; Koufax (SP)

==== Defensive Lineup ====
1965 Postseason Defensive Lineup game log
World Series: vs. Minnesota Twins

#	Date	Opponent	C	1B	2B	3B	SS	LF	CF	RF	P
1	October 6	@ MIN	#8; Roseboro	#28; Parker	#5; Lefebvre	#19; Gilliam	#30; Wills	#41; Johnson	#3; W. Davis	#6; Fairly	#53; Drysdale
2	October 7	@ MIN	#8; Roseboro	#28; Parker	#5; Lefebvre	#19; Gilliam	#30; Wills	#41; Johnson	#3; W. Davis	#6; Fairly	#32; Koufax
3	October 9	MIN	#8; Roseboro	#28; Parker	#5; Lefebvre	#19; Gilliam	#30; Wills	#41; Johnson	#3; W. Davis	#6; Fairly	#23; Osteen
4	October 10	MIN	#8; Roseboro	#28; Parker	#44; Tracewski	#19; Gilliam	#30; Wills	#41; Johnson	#3; W. Davis	#6; Fairly	#53; Drysdale
5	October 11	MIN	#8; Roseboro	#28; Parker	#44; Tracewski	#19; Gilliam	#30; Wills	#41; Johnson	#3; W. Davis	#6; Fairly	#32; Koufax
6	October 13	@ MIN	#8; Roseboro	#28; Parker	#44; Tracewski	#19; Gilliam	#30; Wills	#41; Johnson	#3; W. Davis	#6; Fairly	#23; Osteen
7	October 14	@ MIN	#8; Roseboro	#28; Parker	#44; Tracewski	#19; Gilliam	#30; Wills	#41; Johnson	#3; W. Davis	#6; Fairly	#32; Koufax

== Game Umpires ==
=== Regular Season ===
1965 Regular Season Umpire game log
April

#	Date	Opponent	HP	1B	2B	3B
14	April 29	SF	Al Barlick (crew chief)	Augie Donatelli	Stan Landes	Mel Steiner
15	April 30	SF	Augie Donatelli	Stan Landes	Mel Steiner	Al Barlick (crew chief)

May

#	Date	Opponent	HP	1B	2B	3B
16	May 1	SF	Stan Landes	Mel Steiner	Al Barlick (crew chief)	Augie Donatelli
17	May 2	SF	Mel Steiner	Al Barlick (crew chief)	Augie Donatelli	Stan Landes
21	May 7	@ SF	Bill Jackowski (crew chief)	Ed Vargo	Chris Pelekoudas	Paul Pryor
22	May 8	@ SF	Ed Vargo	Chris Pelekoudas	Paul Pryor	Bill Jackowski (crew chief)
23	May 9	@ SF	Chris Pelekoudas	Paul Pryor	Bill Jackowski (crew chief)	Ed Vargo

June

#	Date	Opponent	HP	1B	2B	3B
61	June 15	SF	Ken Burkhart	Lee Weyer	John Kibler	Frank Secory (crew chief)
62	June 16	SF	Lee Weyer	John Kibler	Frank Secory (crew chief)	Ken Burkhart
63	June 17	SF	John Kibler	Frank Secory (crew chief)	Ken Burkhart	Lee Weyer
74	June 28	@ SF	Al Barlick (crew chief)	Augie Donatelli	Stan Landes	Mel Steiner
75	June 29	@ SF	Augie Donatelli	Stan Landes	Mel Steiner	Al Barlick (crew chief)

July

#	Date	Opponent	HP	1B	2B	3B

August

#	Date	Opponent	HP	1B	2B	3B
122	August 19	@ SF	Tony Venzon	Al Forman	Doug Harvey	Shag Crawford (crew chief)
123	August 20	@ SF	Al Forman	Doug Harvey	Shag Crawford (crew chief)	Tony Venzon
124	August 21	@ SF	Doug Harvey	Shag Crawford (crew chief)	Tony Venzon	Al Forman
125	August 22	@ SF	Shag Crawford (crew chief)	Tony Venzon	Al Forman	Doug Harvey

September

#	Date	Opponent	HP	1B	2B	3B
139	September 6	SF	Tom Gorman (crew chief)	Bill Williams	Ed Sudol	Bob Engel
140	September 7	SF	Bill Williams	Paul Pryor	Bob Engel	Tom Gorman (crew chief)

October

#	Date	Opponent	HP	1B	2B	3B

=== World Series ===
1965 Postseason Umpire game log
World Series: vs. Minnesota Twins

#	Date	Opponent	HP	1B	2B	3B	LF	RF
1	October 6	@ MIN	Eddie Hurley (AL) (crew chief)	Tony Venzon (NL)	Red Flaherty (AL)	Ed Sudol (NL)	Bob Stewart (AL)	Ed Vargo (NL)
2	October 7	@ MIN	Tony Venzon (NL)	Red Flaherty (AL)	Ed Sudol (NL)	Bob Stewart (AL)	Ed Vargo (NL)	Eddie Hurley (AL) (crew chief)
3	October 9	MIN	Red Flaherty (AL)	Ed Sudol (NL)	Bob Stewart (AL)	Ed Vargo (NL)	Eddie Hurley (AL) (crew chief)	Tony Venzon (NL)
4	October 10	MIN	Ed Sudol (NL)	Bob Stewart (AL)	Ed Vargo (NL)	Eddie Hurley (AL) (crew chief)	Tony Venzon (NL)	Red Flaherty (AL)
5	October 11	MIN	Bob Stewart (AL)	Ed Vargo (NL)	Eddie Hurley (AL) (crew chief)	Tony Venzon (NL)	Red Flaherty (AL)	Ed Sudol (NL)
6	October 13	@ MIN	Ed Vargo (NL)	Eddie Hurley (AL) (crew chief)	Tony Venzon (NL)	Red Flaherty (AL)	Ed Sudol (NL)	Bob Stewart (AL)
7	October 14	@ MIN	Eddie Hurley (AL) (crew chief)	Tony Venzon (NL)	Red Flaherty (AL)	Ed Sudol (NL)	Bob Stewart (AL)	Ed Vargo (NL)

== Player stats ==
Note: Team batting and pitching leaders are in bold.

=== Batting ===
==== Starters by position ====
Note: Pos = Position; G = Games played; PA = Plate appearances; AB = At bats; R = Runs scored; H = Hits; 2B = Doubles hit; 3B = Triples hit; HR = Home runs; RBI = Runs batted in; SB = Stolen bases; CS = Caught stealing; BB = Walks; SO = Strikeouts; Avg. = Batting average; OBP = On-base percentage; SLG = Slugging; OPS = On Base + Slugging; TB = Total bases; GDP = Grounded into double play; HBP = Hit by pitch; SH = Sacrifice hits; SF = Sacrifice flies; IBB = Intentional base on balls

Pos	Player	G	PA	AB	R	H	2B	3B	HR	RBI	SB	CS	BB	SO	Avg.	OBP	SLG	OPS	TB	GDP	HBP	SH	SF	IBB
C	John Roseboro	136	480	437	42	102	10	0	8	57	1	6	34	51	.233	.289	.311	.601	136	5	2	3	4	7
1B	Wes Parker	154	644	542	80	129	24	**7**	8	51	13	7	75	**95**	.238	.334	.352	.687	191	6	5	**19**	3	1
2B	Jim Lefebvre	157	631	544	57	136	21	4	**12**	69	3	5	71	92	.250	.337	.369	.706	201	**8**	2	10	4	7
SS	Maury Wills	**158**	**711**	**650**	**92**	**186**	14	**7**	0	33	**94**	**31**	40	64	**.286**	.330	.329	.660	214	6	4	14	2	2
3B	Jim Gilliam	111	432	372	54	104	19	4	4	39	9	5	53	31	.280	.374	.384	.758	143	1	4	1	2	5
LF	Lou Johnson	131	518	468	57	121	24	1	**12**	58	15	6	24	81	.259	.315	**.391**	.706	183	7	**16**	7	3	8
CF	Willie Davis	142	595	558	52	133	24	3	10	57	25	9	14	81	.238	.263	.346	.609	193	7	7	9	**7**	3
RF	Ron Fairly	**158**	654	555	73	152	**28**	1	9	**70**	2	0	**76**	72	.274	**.361**	.377	**.738**	**209**	7	3	14	6	**11**

==== Other batters ====
Note: G = Games played; AB = At bats; H = Hits; Avg. = Batting average; HR = Home runs; RBI = Runs batted in

Player	G	AB	H	Avg.	HR	RBI
Dick Tracewski	78	186	40	.215	1	20
Jeff Torborg	56	150	36	.240	3	13
John Kennedy	104	105	18	.171	1	5
Wally Moon	53	89	18	.202	1	11
Al Ferrara	41	81	17	.210	1	10
Don LeJohn	34	78	20	.256	0	7
Tommy Davis	17	60	15	.250	0	9
Derrell Griffith	22	41	7	.171	1	2
Willie Crawford	52	27	4	.148	0	0
Hector Valle	9	13	4	.308	0	2
Dick Smith	10	6	0	.000	0	1
Johnny Werhas	4	3	0	.000	0	0
Nate Oliver	8	1	1	1.000	0	0

=== Pitching ===
= Indicates league leader

==== Starting pitchers ====
Note: G = Games pitched; IP = Innings pitched; W = Wins; L = Losses; ERA = Earned run average; SO = Strikeouts

Player	G	IP	W	L	ERA	SO
Sandy Koufax	43	**335.2**	**26**	8	**2.04**	**382**
Don Drysdale	44	308.1	23	12	2.77	210
Claude Osteen	40	287.0	15	**15**	2.79	162
Johnny Podres	27	134.0	7	6	3.43	63

==== Other pitchers ====
Note: G = Games pitched; IP = Innings pitched; W = Wins; L = Losses; ERA = Earned run average; SO = Strikeouts

Player	G	IP	W	L	ERA	SO
Howie Reed	38	78.0	7	5	3.12	47
Nick Willhite	15	42.0	2	2	5.36	28
Mike Kekich	5	10.1	0	1	9.58	9

==== Relief pitchers ====
Note: G = Games pitched; W = Wins; L = Losses; SV = Saves; ERA = Earned run average; SO = Strikeouts

Player	G	W	L	SV	ERA	SO
Ron Perranoski	59	6	6	**18**	2.24	53
Bob Miller	**61**	6	7	9	2.97	77
Jim Brewer	19	3	2	2	1.82	31
John Purdin	11	2	1	0	6.75	16
Bill Singer	2	0	0	0	0.00	1

== 1965 World Series ==
=== Game 1 ===
October 6, 1965, at Metropolitan Stadium in Bloomington, Minnesota

Team	1	2	3	4	5	6	7	8	9	R	H	E
Los Angeles (N)	0	1	0	0	0	0	0	0	1	2	10	1
Minnesota (A)	0	1	6	0	0	1	0	0	x	8	10	0
W: Mudcat Grant (1–0) L: Don Drysdale (0–1)
HR: LAD – Ron Fairly (1) MIN – Don Mincher (1), Zoilo Versalles (1)

=== Game 2 ===
October 7, 1965, at Metropolitan Stadium in Bloomington, Minnesota

Team	1	2	3	4	5	6	7	8	9	R	H	E
Los Angeles (N)	0	0	0	0	0	0	1	0	0	1	7	3
Minnesota (A)	0	0	0	0	0	2	1	2	x	5	9	0
W: Jim Kaat (1–0) L: Sandy Koufax (0–1)

=== Game 3 ===
October 9, 1965, at Dodger Stadium in Los Angeles

Team	1	2	3	4	5	6	7	8	9	R	H	E
Minnesota (A)	0	0	0	0	0	0	0	0	0	0	5	0
Los Angeles (N)	0	0	0	2	1	1	0	0	x	4	10	1
W: Claude Osteen (1–0) L: Camilo Pascual (0–1)

=== Game 4 ===
October 10, 1965, at Dodger Stadium in Los Angeles

Team	1	2	3	4	5	6	7	8	9	R	H	E
Minnesota (A)	0	0	0	1	0	1	0	0	0	2	5	2
Los Angeles (N)	1	1	0	1	0	3	0	1	x	7	10	0
W: Don Drysdale (1–1) L: Mudcat Grant (1–1)
HR: MIN – Harmon Killebrew (1), Tony Oliva (1) LAD – Wes Parker (1), Lou Johnson (1)

=== Game 5 ===
October 11, 1965, at Dodger Stadium in Los Angeles

Team	1	2	3	4	5	6	7	8	9	R	H	E
Minnesota (A)	0	0	0	0	0	0	0	0	0	0	4	1
Los Angeles (N)	2	0	2	1	0	0	2	0	x	7	14	0
W: Sandy Koufax (1–1) L: Jim Kaat (1–1)

=== Game 6 ===
October 13, 1965, at Metropolitan Stadium in Bloomington, Minnesota

Team	1	2	3	4	5	6	7	8	9	R	H	E
Los Angeles (N)	0	0	0	0	0	0	1	0	0	1	6	1
Minnesota (A)	0	0	0	2	0	3	0	0	x	5	6	1
W: Mudcat Grant (2–1) L: Claude Osteen (1–1)
HR: LAD – Ron Fairly (2) MIN – Bob Allison (1), Mudcat Grant (1)

=== Game 7 ===
October 14, 1965, at Metropolitan Stadium in Bloomington, Minnesota

Team	1	2	3	4	5	6	7	8	9	R	H	E
Los Angeles (N)	0	0	0	2	0	0	0	0	0	2	7	0
Minnesota (A)	0	0	0	0	0	0	0	0	0	0	3	1
W: Sandy Koufax (2–1) L: Jim Kaat (1–2)
HR: LAD – Lou Johnson (2)

== Awards and honors ==
Hall of Famer Sandy Koufax

- National League Cy Young Award
  - Sandy Koufax
- National League Rookie of the Year
  - Jim Lefebvre
- World Series Most Valuable Player
  - Sandy Koufax
- Associated Press Athlete of the Year
  - Sandy Koufax
- TSN Pitcher of the Year Award
  - Sandy Koufax
- TSN Major League Player of the Year Award
  - Sandy Koufax

=== All-Stars ===
- 1965 Major League Baseball All-Star Game
  - Maury Wills starter
  - Don Drysdale reserve
  - Sandy Koufax reserve
- TSN National League All-Star
  - Sandy Koufax
  - Maury Wills

== Farm system ==
Level	Team	League	Manager
AAA	Spokane Indians	Pacific Coast League	Bill Brenzel; Duke Snider; Pete Reiser
AA	Albuquerque Dodgers	Texas League	Roy Hartsfield
A	Santa Barbara Dodgers	California League	Norm Sherry
A	St. Petersburg Saints	Florida State League	George Scherger
A	Salem Dodgers	Northwest League	Stan Wasiak
Rookie	Pocatello Chiefs	Pioneer League	Tommy Lasorda

LEAGUE CHAMPIONS: Albuquerque

== 1965 Major League Baseball draft ==
This was the first Major League Baseball draft. The Dodgers drafted 30 players this year in the June draft and an additional two in the August Legion draft. The first player the Dodgers ever drafted was a shortstop from Bakersfield High School named John Wyatt. He played in the teams farm system through 1970 but never advanced past Class-A. Five players from this draft class eventually played in Major League Baseball.

The most notable player drafted this year was Tom Seaver, who was picked in the 10th round from the University of Southern California, but he did not sign with the team and re-entered the draft the following year, where he was selected by the New York Mets.

1965 draft picks

=== June draft ===
Round	Name	Position	School	Signed	Career span	Highest level
1	John Wyatt	SS	Bakersfield High School	Yes	1965–1970	A
2	Alan Foster	RHP	Los Altos High School	Yes	1965–1976	MLB
3	Michael Criscione	C	Syracuse University	Yes	1965–1967	A
4	George Mercado	OF	Bishop Dubois High School	Yes	1965–1967	A-
5	John Radosevich	LHP	West Virginia University	Yes	1965–1968	A
6	Peter Barnes	OF	Southern University and A&M College	No		
7	Larry Griffith	RHP	Anadarko High School	Yes	1965–1967	AA
8	James Johnson	OF	Las Vegas High School	Yes	1965–1970	A
9	Paul Dennenbaum	1B	Syracuse University	No		
10	Tom Seaver	RHP	University of Southern California	No; Mets −1966	1966–1986	MLB
11	Joseph Austin	1B	University of Southern California	Yes	1965–1966	A
12	Richard Binder	LHP	Waterloo High School	No		
13	Terrance Derringer	RHP	Southwest Miami High School	No		
14	Stephen McGreevy	1B	University of Kansas	Yes	1965–1967	A
15	Leon Everitt	RHP	Pemberton High School	Yes	1965–1969	MLB
16	Michael McCall	SS	Greenville High School	No; Red Sox −1965	1967–1970	A
17	Johnny Alexander	INF	Whitmire High School	No		
18	Rod Austin	OF	Santa Clara University	No		
19	George Lewark	SS	University of Colorado	No		
20	William Maxwell	RHP	Central High School	No		
21	Daro Quiring	RHP	Stanford University	No		
22	Eric Krumlauf	3B	Shaker Heights High School	No		
23	Rich Hinton	LHP	Marana High School	No; White Sox −1969	1969–1979	MLB
24	Frederick Moulder	SS	Oklahoma State University	Yes	1967–1972	AAA
25	Jon Keirns	OF	Edmond High School	No		
26	Robert Harvey	3B	John Marshall High School	Yes	1966–1968	A
27	Rhett Thompson	3B	Del Mar High School	Yes	1965–1967	A-
28	Gary Moore	OF	University of Texas at Austin	Yes	1967–1971	MLB
29	Kyle Carlin	RHP	Sulphur High School	Yes	1965–1969	AA
30	Dennis Jensen	SS	Jacksonville University	Yes	1965	A

=== August Legion draft ===
The August Legion draft was for college players who had participated in summer amateur leagues.

Round	Name	Position	School	Signed	Career span	Highest level
1	Barry Snyder	C		No		
2	Frank Stanek	1B		No		
