= Howie Reed =

American baseball player (1936–1984)

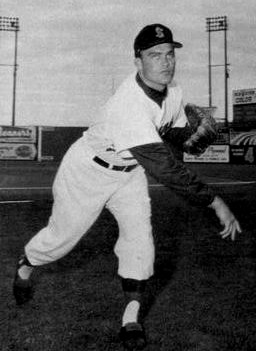
- Pitcher
- Born: December 21, 1936; Dallas, Texas, U.S.
- Died: December 7, 1984 (aged 47); Corpus Christi, Texas, U.S.
- Batted: Right Threw: Right

MLB debut
- September 13, 1958, for the Kansas City Athletics

Last MLB appearance
- September 17, 1971, for the Montreal Expos

MLB statistics
- Win–loss record: 26–29
- Earned run average: 3.72
- Strikeouts: 268
- Stats at Baseball Reference

Teams
- Kansas City Athletics (1958–1960); Los Angeles Dodgers (1964–1966); California Angels (1966); Houston Astros (1967); Montreal Expos (1969–1971)

Career highlights and awards
- World Series champion (1965)

Howard Dean Reed (December 21, 1936 – December 7, 1984) was an American professional baseball player, a right-handed pitcher who appeared in 229 Major League games over ten seasons (1958–60; 1964–67; 1969–71) for the Kansas City Athletics, Los Angeles Dodgers, California Angels, Houston Astros and Montreal Expos. Listed at 6 feet 1 inch (1.85 m) tall and 195 pounds (88 kg), Reed was born in Dallas, Texas, and attended Woodrow Wilson High School and the University of Texas at Austin.

== Early baseball career ==
Reed signed with the Athletics in September 1957 and made his pro debut the following year. He spent most of the 1958 minor league season with the Albany Senators of the Class A Eastern League, winning ten games for a last-place team with a solid 3.14 earned run average. Recalled by the Athletics in September 1958, he was unscored upon in two relief appearances and was rewarded with his first big-league start on September 27 against the Chicago White Sox. Reed proceeded to throw a five-hit, complete game victory, winning 2–1 and gaining the decision over eventual Hall of Famer Early Wynn.

== Member of 1965 world champions ==
Reed failed to stick with Kansas City in both 1959 and 1960, getting into only seven total games and going winless in three decisions. He did post winning campaigns at the Triple-A level, however, and at the close of spring training in 1961, the Dodgers acquired him for right-hander Ed Rakow. Reed then spent almost 3 1/2 seasons pitching for the Dodgers' Triple-A affiliate, the Spokane Indians of the Pacific Coast League, winning 45 games—including 19 in 1963. The Dodgers recalled him in June 1964 and used him in 26 games, including seven starting assignments, through the rest of the season. He wore No. 39 during his Dodger tenure, the number made famous by (and eventually retired to honor) Baseball Hall of Fame catcher Roy Campanella.

Reed won a spot on the 1965 Dodgers' roster and contributed to their National League pennant-winning season. He appeared in 38 games, five as a starter. He won a career-high seven contests (losing five), picked up a save and registered a 3.12 earned run average. He then pitched in two games against the Minnesota Twins during the 1965 World Series; he hurled 1 1/3 scoreless innings in Game 1, but was treated roughly in Game 6 when he allowed a three-run home run to the opposing pitcher, Mudcat Grant. The Dodgers prevailed in seven games, earning Reed a World Series ring.

The following May, however, he was traded to the Dodgers' American League neighbors, the California Angels. He worked in only 20 big-league games (19 with the Angels), and spent part of 1966 in the minor leagues. Traded to the Astros during the off-season, Reed was assigned to the Triple-A Oklahoma City 89ers and in 1967 he notched another 19-game-winning season. The Astros auditioned him in four September 1967 games, but sent him back to Oklahoma City for 1968, when he won another 15 games for the 89ers.

== Late career with Expos ==
The following season, 1969, saw four expansion teams enter the Major Leagues, two in each circuit. Houston sold Reed and two other pitchers to the fledgling Montreal Expos on April 3. Although Reed began the year back in the Pacific Coast League, he was recalled to Montreal in June and spent the next 2 1/2 seasons on the Expos' big-league roster, getting into 131 games, 115 in relief, winning 14 games and saving six more. He played one more year, 1972, in the minor leagues before retiring from baseball.

As a Major Leaguer, Reed allowed 510 hits and 208 bases on balls in 515 1/3 innings pitched, with 268 strikeouts. He added nine saves to his 26–29 lifetime win–loss record. He won 127 games in the minor leagues.

== Later life ==
Reed remained in Montréal for two seasons after his playing retirement, working for Seagram's and hosting Expos-related radio and television shows.

Reed began to experience heart troubles and returned to his farm in Mathis, Texas, where he raised cotton and grain, and where he died due to heart failure at age 47 in 1984.
