= Jim Brewer (baseball) =

American baseball player (1937–1987)

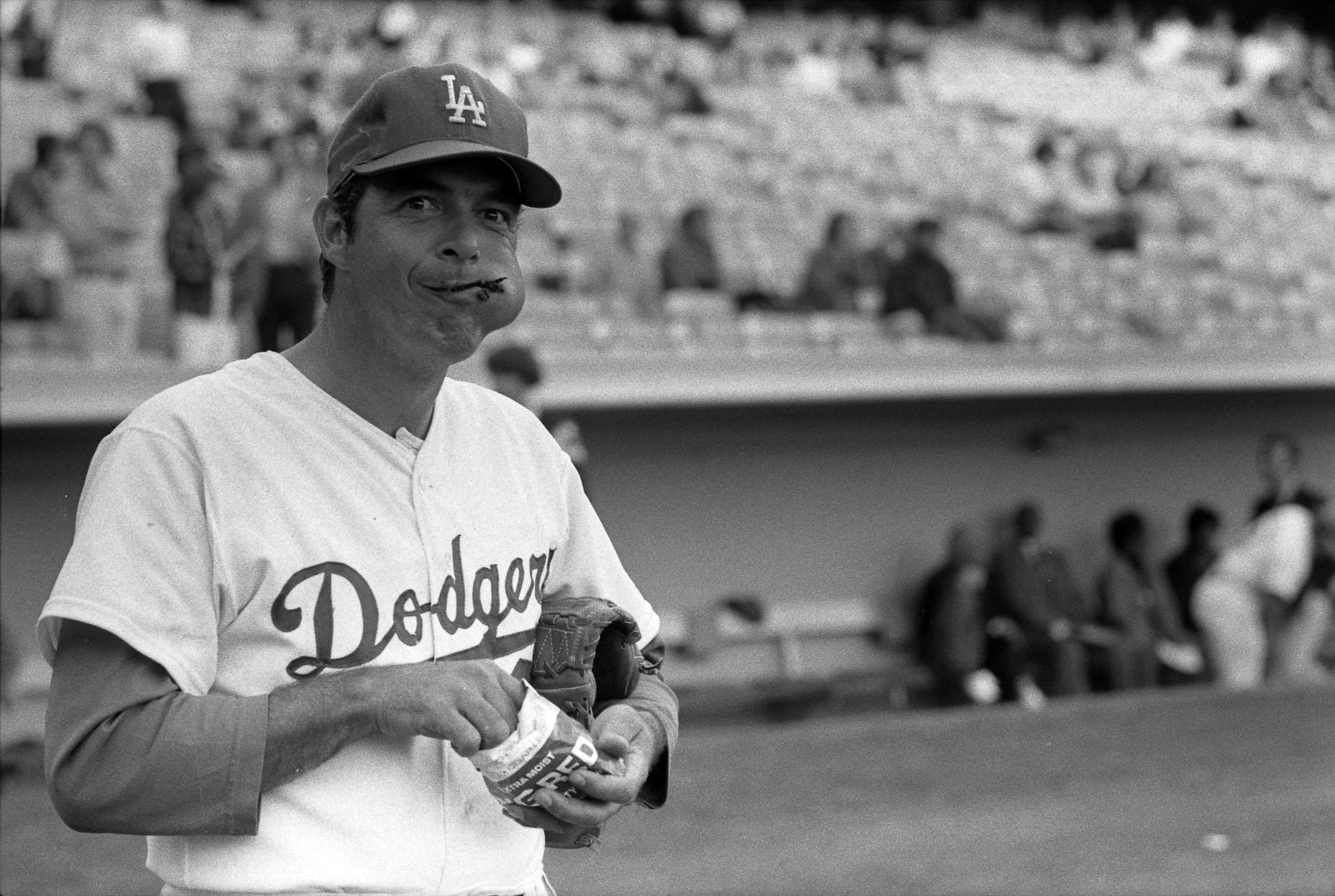
- Brewer in 1974
- Pitcher
- Born: November 14, 1937; Merced, California, U.S.
- Died: November 16, 1987 (aged 50); Tyler, Texas, U.S.
- Batted: Left Threw: Left

MLB debut
- July 17, 1960, for the Chicago Cubs

Last MLB appearance
- May 24, 1976, for the California Angels

MLB statistics
- Win–loss record: 69–65
- Earned run average: 3.07
- Strikeouts: 810
- Saves: 133
- Stats at Baseball Reference

Teams
- As player: Chicago Cubs (1960–1963); Los Angeles Dodgers (1964–1975); California Angels (1975–1976); As coach: Montreal Expos (1977–1979)

Career highlights and awards
- All-Star (1973); World Series champion (1965)

James Thomas Brewer (November 14, 1937 – November 16, 1987) was an American professional baseball relief pitcher and coach. He played in Major League Baseball (MLB) from 1960 through 1976 for the Chicago Cubs, Los Angeles Dodgers, and California Angels. He batted and threw left-handed.

Following the advice of Warren Spahn, Brewer developed a screwball to become one of the most successful relievers in the National League in the 1960s and 1970s.

== Career ==
A graduate of Broken Arrow Senior High in Broken Arrow, Oklahoma, Brewer compiled a 69–65 record with 810 strikeouts and a 3.07 earned run average in a 17-year career that began with the Cubs and ended with the Angels, and in between spent twelve seasons with the Dodgers.

In his career, Brewer recorded 133 saves, 126 with the Dodgers, appearing in 474 games for the club. Only two Dodgers pitchers, Don Sutton and Don Drysdale, have more appearances—550 and 518, respectively. As a Dodger, Brewer appeared in the 1973 All-Star Game and in three World Series (1965, 1966, and 1974). From 1968 to 1973 he averaged 20 saves a season, with a career-high 24 in 1970, and in 1972, he posted a 1.26 earned run average, allowing only 4.7 hits per nine innings.

Brewer was involved in an on-field altercation with Billy Martin on August 4, 1960. Brewer, then with the Cubs, brushed back Martin, then with the Cincinnati Reds, with a pitch in the second inning of a game at Wrigley Field. Martin threw his bat at Brewer, who picked it up and started to hand it to Martin as Martin approached. Martin punched Brewer in the right eye, breaking his cheekbone. Brewer was twice operated on for his injuries, and Martin served a five-day suspension. The Cubs and Brewer sued Martin for over $1 million for the loss of Brewer's services, but later dropped their case. Brewer, however, pursued his, and in 1969 a judge ordered Martin to pay $10,000 in damages.

Immediately after his playing career, Brewer became pitching coach of the Montreal Expos, serving for three seasons (1977–79) on the staff of future Hall of Fame manager Dick Williams.

== Death ==
Brewer died in Tyler, Texas, of injuries suffered in an automobile accident at the age of 50.

== Sources ==
- Career statistics from MLB · Baseball Reference · Fangraphs · Baseball Reference (Minors) · Retrosheet · Baseball Almanac
- Jim Brewer at the Society for American Baseball Research (SABR BioProject)

Sporting positions
Preceded by Larry Bearnarth	Montreal Expos pitching coach 1977–1979	Succeeded by Galen Cisco
