= Nick Willhite =

American baseball player (1941–2008)

- Pitcher
- Born: January 27, 1941; Tulsa, Oklahoma, U.S.
- Died: December 14, 2008 (aged 67); Alpine, Utah, U.S.
- Batted: Left Threw: Left

MLB debut
- June 16, 1963, for the Los Angeles Dodgers

Last MLB appearance
- June 23, 1967, for the New York Mets

MLB statistics
- Win–loss record: 6–12
- Earned run average: 4.55
- Strikeouts: 118
- Stats at Baseball Reference

Teams
- Los Angeles Dodgers (1963–1964); Washington Senators (1965); Los Angeles Dodgers (1965–1966); California Angels (1967); New York Mets (1967)

Jon Nicholas Willhite (January 27, 1941 – December 14, 2008) was an American professional baseball player, a left-handed pitcher. Born in Tulsa, Oklahoma, Willhite grew up in Denver, Colorado and graduated from South High School in 1959. He was signed by the Los Angeles Dodgers in 1959 and was called up to Major League Baseball in 1963 and pitched from 1963 to 1967 for the Dodgers, Washington Senators, California Angels and New York Mets.

Willhite was with the Dodgers when they won the 1965 World Series, but he did not pitch in the series. He was out of baseball by age 26, with an overall record of 6–12 and a 4.55 ERA.

Willhite later worked as a pitching coach at Brigham Young University and in the Milwaukee Brewers and New York Yankees organizations.

Willhite was an alcoholic by the time he was 22 years old and was sometimes drunk on the field. Willhite was married and divorced three times and later became addicted to drugs as well as alcohol. In 1989, he hit rock bottom after selling his World Series ring. He then reached out to another former Dodger pitcher, Stan Williams, for help. He ultimately received that help from the Baseball Assistance Team, which assists former baseball players in need. Willhite entered a treatment center in Fort Collins, Colorado in 1989 and later became an addictions counselor after graduating from the University of Utah.

Willhite died of cancer at his son's home in Alpine, Utah.
