= Bob Stewart (umpire) =

American baseball umpire (1915-1981)

- Born: Robert William Stewart; June 24, 1915; Blackstone, Massachusetts, U.S.
- Died: December 20, 1981 (aged 66); Woonsocket, Rhode Island, U.S.
- Occupation: Umpire
- Years active: 1958-1970
- Employer: American League

Robert William Stewart (June 24, 1915 – December 20, 1981) was an American professional baseball umpire who worked in the American League from 1958 to 1970. Stewart umpired 1,958 major league games in his 13-year career. He umpired in three World Series (1961, 1965 and 1970), two All-Star Games (1962 and 1969) and the 1969 American League Championship Series.

Steward served as a police officer for the Woonsocket, Rhode Island Police Department from 1943 to 1945.
