= Al Barlick =

American baseball umpire (1915-1995)

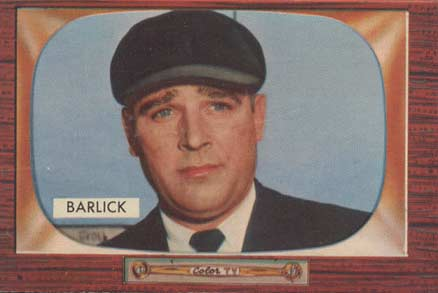
- Born: May 2, 1915; Springfield, Illinois, U.S.
- Died: December 27, 1995 (aged 80); Springfield, Illinois, U.S.
- Occupation: National League Umpire
- Years active: 1940–1943, 1946–1955, 1958–1971
- Spouse: Jennie Marie Leffell (m. 1941)
- Children: Marlene, Kathleen
- Baseball career

Member of the National

Baseball Hall of Fame
- Induction: 1989
- Election method: Veterans Committee

Albert Joseph Barlick (April 2, 1915 – December 27, 1995) was an American umpire in Major League Baseball who worked in the National League for 28 seasons (1940–1943, 1946–1955, 1958–1971). Barlick missed two seasons (1944–45) due to service in the United States Coast Guard and two seasons (1956–57) due to heart problems. He umpired seven World Series and seven All-Star Games.

Barlick was known for a strong voice and for booming strike calls. After he left active umpiring in 1971, Barlick became an umpire scout and supervisor. He was elected to the Baseball Hall of Fame in 1989.

== Early life ==
Barlick was born in Springfield, Illinois. His father, an Austrian immigrant, worked for 50 years at a Peabody coal mine. Barlick dropped out of high school after two years to support his family. He joined the Civilian Conservation Corps, and spent six months in Washington and six months in Wisconsin. When Barlick's brother died, he returned to the coal mine to assist his father.

Barlick said that he did not play much baseball as a youngster, but that he often watched the game. During a coal mine strike, a 19-year-old Barlick was offered $1 ($24) to umpire his first game. He played outfield in semi-pro baseball, but he was described as "mediocre." In August 1936, the Class-D Northeast Arkansas League, in need of a replacement umpire, hired Barlick for the last four weeks of the season. In 1937, Barlick was hired by the Class-B Piedmont League, moved to the Eastern League in 1939, and was promoted to the International League later that season.

== MLB career ==
=== Early career ===
Late in the 1940 season, NL umpire Bill Klem was unable to work due to an ankle injury, so Barlick was hired as a replacement. He made his debut in a doubleheader at Shibe Park on September 8. Barlick was offered a contract for the 1941 season, and was 26 years old at the start of the season, making him one of the youngest MLB umpires in history. Before the 1941 season, Klem had strongly endorsed Barlick, saying, "He's going to be the greatest umpire in baseball history. He has a love of his work, a pride in it and the physical qualifications. Young? Certainly. But there's something wrong with an umpire who serves a long time in the minors."

Barlick made his first ejection on July 27 of that year, when Brooklyn Dodgers catcher Herman Franks objected to Barlick's strike zone. Barlick was selected as an umpire for the 1942 All-Star Game at the Polo Grounds.

Barlick joined the Coast Guard in November 1943, during World War II. He spent most of the next two years assigned to an 83-foot cutter based at the Coast Guard Academy in New London, Connecticut. He was discharged in 1945, having earned the rank of Seaman First Class.

=== Return from the Coast Guard ===
Barlick returned to umpiring in 1946, when he umpired his first World Series. Klem repeated his endorsement of Barlick that year. "There's a fellow who's going to be one of the great all-time umpires. He's got everything and knows how to handle himself. Before I saw him, I predicted he'd be a great umpire just from what I heard about him." In 1947, Barlick was the first base umpire during Jackie Robinson's MLB debut. In 1949, Barlick was again chosen as an umpire for the 1949 All-Star Game. He began the game at home plate, although when it became time for the umpires to rotate, as was customary during All-Star games, Barlick left the game, leaving the right field line uncovered; no reason was given for his departure.

In August 1949, Barlick ruled a forfeit at Shibe Park in a game between the Philadelphia Phillies and New York Giants. Fans had become irate over a call made by Barlick's crew member George Barr, and they littered the field with fruit, soda bottles and paper. The ruling constituted the first major league forfeit since 1942.

Before the 1956 season, Barlick was hospitalized in Illinois for treatment of a heart problem. League president Warren Giles characterized the issue as a minor heart ailment, but newspaper reports held that Barlick would not be ready for opening day that year. After he sat out the entire 1956 season, a March 1957 article reported that the heart issue would probably cause him to miss that season as well. He returned to the field for the 1958 season.

=== Later career ===
In 1961, the Sporting News polled managers and coaches to determine the best umpires in the major leagues. Barlick was voted as the most respected umpire in the National League, as well as the best caller of balls and strikes, best on the bases, best knowledge of rules, best at being in the right position and most serious-minded. Barlick stated that the poll was a disgrace due to the lack of qualifications of the writers and the nature of the categories, which included "most sarcastic", "hardest to talk to", "biggest grandstander", and "worst pop-off".

In 1963, the league instructed umpires to crack down on balks by pitchers. A few weeks after ejecting pitcher Bob Shaw due to an argument about balks, Barlick called Fred Fleig, the secretary of the National League, and said, “I'm fed up with the whole thing and I am going to quit and go home.” On June 17, 1963, Giles announced that there had been a "misunderstanding" and that Barlick would relax at his home for a few days before rejoining his umpire crew.

After the 1963 season, Barlick took a job as a public relations representative at Springfield's City Water, Light & Power utility. However, he returned as an umpire for the 1964 season. Barlick's crew worked the first game at the Houston Astrodome in 1965. In 1966, Barlick missed nine games after his mother, Louise, died in Springfield. He missed the last two weeks of the 1966 season due to high blood pressure. After the 1968 season, Barlick accompanied the St. Louis Cardinals on a five-week tour of Japan. In 1969, Barlick was the crew chief for the first-ever National League Championship Series. In late 1970, he umpired the final game at Forbes Field in Pittsburgh as well as the first game at Riverfront Stadium in Cincinnati.

In 1971, Barlick was awarded the Umpire of the Year Award at the Al Somers Umpire School, which was based on a poll of other MLB umpires. He stated that the award was "very special," and that it was "a true, honorable, sincere award because it is given to an umpire by umpires." The 1971 season was Barlick's final year of umpiring, and he skipped the final series of the season at the advice of his fellow umpires. Barlick retired with seven All-Star Game appearances (1942, 1949, 1952, 1955, 1959, 1966, 1970) as well as seven World Series (1946, 1950, 1951, 1954, 1958, 1962, 1967).

Barlick had been known for his very loud calls behind home plate. Subsequent MLB officials, including Dusty Boggess and Dutch Rennert, said that they tried to imitate him when they became umpires.

=== Supervisor and scout ===
After retiring from umpiring, Barlick was hired by the league to supervise and scout umpires, a job he held for 22 years. Barlick scouted many umpires who wound up having long careers, and was, according to Bruce Froemming, “very proud of the staff he built.” Sportswriter Jerome Holtzman wrote that Barlick was outspoken when defending the league's umpires to NL president Warren Giles and baseball commissioner Ford Frick. When the umpires went on strike at the conclusion of the 1984 regular season, Barlick and fellow supervisor Ed Vargo were located in the dugouts during the playoffs to assist the replacement umpires with questions over rules.

== Later life ==
In 1989, he was elected to the Baseball Hall of Fame by the Veterans Committee. Manager Leo Durocher and umpire Bill McGowan were also considered by the committee that year, but the group could only vote in one non-player per year. Barlick had been under consideration by the committee for several years before his election. In his induction speech, Barlick said, "My dreams are fulfilled far beyond my expectations."

Barlick wore uniform number 1 when the NL adopted them for its umpires in 1970; however, the league retired number 3 in Barlick's honor after his induction into the Baseball Hall of Fame in 1989.

On December 27, 1995, Barlick collapsed at his home. He was taken to Memorial Medical Center in Springfield, where he died. His wife, Jennie, and two children survived him. He was cremated.

In 2013, the Bob Feller Act of Valor Award honored Barlick as one of 37 Baseball Hall of Fame members for his service in the Coast Guard during World War II.
