= Don Dennis =

American baseball player (1942–2007)

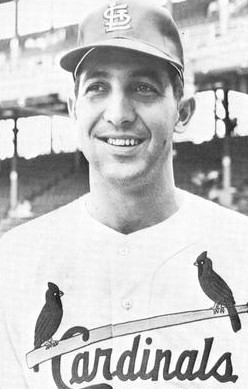
- Dennis in 1965
- Pitcher
- Born: March 3, 1942; Uniontown, Kansas, U.S.
- Died: March 22, 2007 (aged 65); Fort Scott, Kansas, U.S.
- Batted: Right Threw: Right

MLB debut
- June 18, 1965, for the St. Louis Cardinals

Last MLB appearance
- September 17, 1966, for the St. Louis Cardinals

MLB statistics
- Win–loss record: 6–5
- Earned run average: 3.69
- Innings pitched: 114 2/3
- Stats at Baseball Reference

Teams
- St. Louis Cardinals (1965–1966)

Donald Ray Dennis (March 3, 1942 – March 22, 2007) was an American middle relief pitcher in Major League Baseball who played in 1965 and 1966 for the St. Louis Cardinals. Dennis batted and threw right-handed. He was born in Uniontown, Kansas.

A hard-throwing fastballer, Dennis recorded a 1.47 earned run average for the Triple-A Jacksonville Suns in 1965 before being called up to the Cardinals in the midseason. He ended the year with a 2–3 mark, six saves, and a 2.29 ERA in 41 appearances, on a team whose collective ERA was 3.77. His efforts gained him St. Louis Rookie of the Year honors. The next year he went 4–2 in 38 games, including one emergency start, but his ERA dipped to 4.98. He has the distinction of winning the first game in Busch Stadium II on May 12, 1966. Before the 1967 season, he was sent by St. Louis along with Walt Williams to the Chicago White Sox in exchange for Johnny Romano and a minor leaguer, but he never appeared in the majors for Chicago.

In a two-season career, Dennis posted a 6–5 record with a 3.69 ERA and eight saves in 79 games. Dennis died of cancer in Fort Scott, Kansas, at age 65.
