= Red Flaherty =

American baseball umpire (1917-1999)

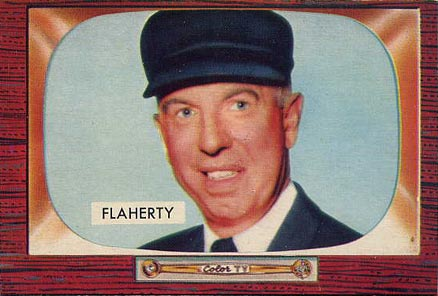
- Born: John Francis Flaherty; April 25, 1917; Maynard, Massachusetts, U.S.
- Died: April 1, 1999 (aged 81); Falmouth, Massachusetts, U.S.
- Occupation: Umpire
- Years active: 1953-1973
- Employer: American League

John Francis "Red" Flaherty (April 25, 1917 – April 1, 1999) was an American professional baseball umpire who worked in the American League from 1953 to 1973. Flaherty umpired 3,208 major league games in his 21-year career. He umpired in four World Series (1955, 1958, 1965, and 1970), two League Championship Series (1969 and 1972) and three All-Star Games (1956, 1961 and 1969).

In 1936, Flaherty played for Falmouth in the Cape Cod Baseball League.

== Death ==
Flaherty died on April 1, 1999, at his home in Falmouth, MA. His death resulted from stroke-related complications.
