= Wes Parker =

American baseball player (born 1939)

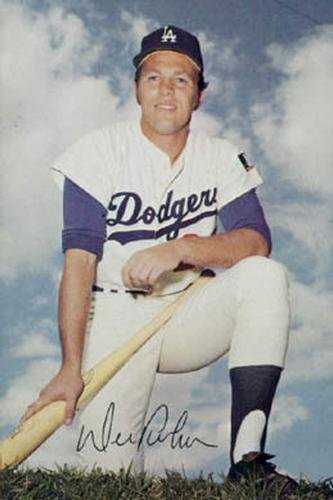
- First baseman
- Born: November 13, 1939 (age 86); Evanston, Illinois, U.S.
- Batted: Switch Threw: Left

Professional debut
- MLB: April 19, 1964, for the Los Angeles Dodgers
- NPB: April 6, 1974, for the Nankai Hawks

Last appearance
- MLB: October 1, 1972, for the Los Angeles Dodgers
- NPB: September 28, 1974, for the Nankai Hawks

MLB statistics
- Batting average: .267
- Home runs: 64
- Runs batted in: 470

NPB statistics
- Batting average: .301
- Home runs: 14
- Runs batted in: 59
- Stats at Baseball Reference

Teams
- Los Angeles Dodgers (1964–1972); Nankai Hawks (1974)

Career highlights and awards
- World Series champion (1965); 6× Gold Glove Award (1967–1972); Diamond Glove Award (1974)

Maurice Wesley Parker III (born November 13, 1939) is an American former first baseman in Major League Baseball who played for the Los Angeles Dodgers from 1964 to 1972. He also played one season in Japan for the Nankai Hawks in 1974.

As of 2009, Parker has been a member of the Los Angeles Dodgers organization serving as a representative of the Dodgers Legend Bureau.

== Biography ==
=== Major League playing career ===
Parker was part of the Dodgers' 1965 and 1966 World Series teams. Known as one of the slickest fielding first basemen of all time, he won the National League Gold Glove Award for first base every year from 1967 to 1972. In 1970, Parker posted a career high batting average of .319 and performed the unusual feat of driving in over 100 runs in a season while hitting no more than 10 home runs.

In a game against the New York Mets on May 7, 1970, Parker hit for the cycle. He was the last Los Angeles Dodger to accomplish that feat until Orlando Hudson did so against the San Francisco Giants on April 13, 2009.

On August 21, 2007, Parker was voted the best defensive first baseman in baseball since the inception of the Gold Glove award in 1957, and named to the Major League Baseball All-time Gold Glove Team. He is the only member of the team who is not in the Baseball Hall of Fame (Parker is not eligible to enter the Hall of Fame as a player because he played in only nine seasons, one fewer than the minimum required for consideration).

Parker is the only Dodger to have received the All-Time Gold Glove Team award.

After Sunday home games in the final years of his career, Parker would hit fly balls to local kids outside Dodger Stadium, then drive as many as would fit into his car for ice cream and sodas. He said that he enjoyed his interactions with the kids more than he did playing the games for which he was paid.

=== Career statistics ===
In nine seasons and 1,288 games played, Parker compiled a .267 batting average (1110-4157), with 548 runs scored, 64 home runs, 470 RBI, 532 walks, .351 on-base percentage and .375 slugging percentage. In 11 World Series games (1965 and '66) he hit .278 (10-36). At 1,108 games at first base, his primary position, his fielding percentage was .996. He also played at all three outfield positions.

=== Labor issues ===
Major League Baseball had its first ever work stoppage with a strike at the beginning of the 1972 season, which lasted 13 days. The player representatives voted 47–0, with one abstention, in favor of the strike. The abstention was Parker, who felt a deep appreciation for everything the Dodgers had done for him.

=== Other endeavors ===
Parker retired from Major League Baseball after the 1972 season. He worked as a television color analyst for the Cincinnati Reds in 1973.

In 1974, he signed with the Nankai Hawks of Nippon Professional Baseball's Pacific League. He would win the Diamond Glove Award as the best defensive first baseman in the Pacific League (the award is now called the Golden Glove), making him one of only four players to win Gold Gloves in both MLB and NPB.

Parker subsequently pursued an acting career, and appeared in a number of television roles in the 1970s. His most famous role came in episode #17 of The Brady Bunch, "The Undergraduate" (January 23, 1970), as the fiancée of Greg Brady's math teacher, on whom Greg has such a huge crush that it distracts him from his studies. Parker promises Greg two tickets to opening day if he earns an A in the class. Parker eventually gave up acting, saying it did not fit his introverted personality.

Parker also was a baseball broadcaster for NBC in 1978–79 and for USA Network in 1980–83.

== Personal life ==
Born in Evanston, Illinois, Parker grew up in West Los Angeles, in the affluent neighborhood of Brentwood. His mother was Mary (nee Joslyn), and his father was Maurice Wesley Parker Jr., president of the Parker Manufacturing Company and son of Maurice W. Parker Sr. Parker had an older sister named Celia and a younger brother named Lyn.

He attended Claremont Men's College, transferred to USC, graduating from USC with a B.A. in history.

Beginning in 2001, Parker began as a volunteer teacher of a weekly sports class at the Braille Institute in Los Angeles.

=== Religious views ===
Parker served as a voice of faith for the ministry of television preacher Dr. Gene Scott. During a 1982 broadcast (index number S-1086-3), Parker spoke with Scott publicly for over twenty minutes, stating that before coming across Dr. Scott's television program, he had never understood or felt drawn toward Christianity. He explained that it was Scott's intelligent and fact-based approach to teaching that earned his respect and allowed him to build faith. He stated that his earlier exposures to Christianity had no effect, because they were mostly based on simplistic platitudes such as "God is love" which he found unconvincing.

== See also ==
- List of Major League Baseball annual doubles leaders
- List of Major League Baseball players to hit for the cycle

Achievements
Preceded by Jim Fregosi	Hitting for the cycle May 7, 1970	Succeeded by Rod Carew
