= Ed Sudol =

American baseball umpire (1920-2004)

- Born: Edward Lawrence Sudol; September 13, 1920; Passaic, New Jersey, U.S.
- Died: December 10, 2004 (aged 84); Daytona Beach, Florida, U.S.
- Occupation: Umpire
- Years active: 1957–1977
- Employer: National League

Edward Lawrence Sudol (September 13, 1920 – December 10, 2004) was an American baseball umpire who worked in the National League from 1957 to 1977. Sudol umpired 3,247 major league games in his 21-year career, wearing uniform number 16 for most of his career. He umpired in three World Series (1965, 1971, and 1977), three League Championship Series (1969, 1973, and 1976) and three All-Star Games (1961, 1964 and 1974). Sudol was also the home plate umpire for Jim Bunning's perfect game in 1964, as well as Bill Singer's no-hitter in 1970. In 1974, he was the second base umpire when Hank Aaron broke Babe Ruth's career home run record.

Sudol played in the minor leagues from 1940 to 1953, mainly as a first baseman. As Sudol realized his playing career was drawing to a close, he enrolled in an umpiring school in Daytona Beach, and after umpiring in the minor leagues for multiple years, was called up to the National League in 1957.

Sudol died on December 10, 2004, in Daytona Beach; he had been suffering from Alzheimer's disease.

== See also ==
- List of Major League Baseball umpires (disambiguation)
