= 1965 World Series =

1965 Major League Baseball championship series

| Team (Wins) | Managers | Season |
|---|---|---|
| Los Angeles Dodgers (4) | Walter Alston | 97–65, .599, GA: 2 |
| Minnesota Twins (3) | Sam Mele | 102–60, .630, GA: 7 |
- Dates: October 6–14
- Venue(s): Metropolitan Stadium (Minnesota); Dodger Stadium (Los Angeles)
- MVP: Sandy Koufax (Los Angeles)
- Umpires: Eddie Hurley (AL), Tony Venzon (NL), Red Flaherty (AL), Ed Sudol (NL), Bob Stewart (AL), Ed Vargo (NL)
- Hall of Famers: Dodgers: Walt Alston (manager); Don Drysdale; Sandy Koufax; Twins: Jim Kaat; Harmon Killebrew; Tony Oliva

Broadcast
- Television: NBC
- TV announcers: Ray Scott and Vin Scully
- Radio: NBC
- Radio announcers: By Saam and Joe Garagiola

The 1965 World Series was the championship series of Major League Baseball's (MLB) 1965 season. The 62nd edition of the World Series, it was a best-of-seven playoff that matched the National League (NL) champion Los Angeles Dodgers against the American League (AL) champion Minnesota Twins. The Dodgers won in seven games.

The series is best remembered for the heroics of pitcher Sandy Koufax, who was named the World Series Most Valuable Player, following a regular season of 26 wins, 8 losses and a 2.04 earned run average. Koufax did not pitch in Game 1, as it fell on the Jewish holy day of Yom Kippur. He pitched well but lost Game 2 before going on to toss shutouts in Games 5 and 7 (with only two days of rest in between) to win the championship.

The Twins had won their first pennant in Minnesota and the franchise’s first since 1933 when the team was known as the Washington Senators. The Dodgers won their second title in three years, and their third since moving to Los Angeles in 1958.

== Background ==
Both teams improved from sixth-place finishes in 1964; the Twins won the A.L. pennant with relative ease while the Dodgers were locked in a season-long five-way battle in the N.L. among themselves, the Giants, Pirates, Reds, and Braves. After the Giants won their 14th-consecutive game to take a 4 1/2-game lead on September 16, the Dodgers went on a 13-game winning streak over the final two weeks of the season to clinch the pennant on the next to last day of the season over the second place rival Giants.

During the 1965 season, the Dodgers relied heavily on the arms of Sandy Koufax and Don Drysdale, and would rely on them even more in the World Series, as the Dodgers only used seven pitchers. The Dodgers' strong core of pitchers, which also included Claude Osteen and Ron Perranoski, kept them in the pennant race and into the Series. Koufax, surviving on a steady diet of cortisone and pain killers for his arthritic left elbow, pitched five times in 15 days down the stretch, winning four (three shutouts), including 13 strikeouts in the pennant winner against Milwaukee.

Dodger hitting however remained strictly popgun, especially after Tommy Davis went down in late April for the season with a broken ankle. Manager Walter Alston promptly called up 12-year minor league veteran Lou Johnson from Spokane. Johnson led the Dodgers, along with ROY Jim Lefebvre, in home runs with just 12.

The Twins, managed by Sam Mele, had a more balanced attack, equally strong in pitching and hitting, although their defense committed 173 errors including 39 by shortstop Zoilo Versalles. Despite that, he was named AL Most Valuable Player, and won a Gold Glove Award for his defensive play. He led the team with 126 runs scored. Offensively Mele again had balance with good hitting, power and speed up and down his lineup that included the AL's leading hitter (Tony Oliva, at .321), and 20-plus home runs from five different players. Top-level slugger Harmon Killebrew, normally good for 40+ HR per year, was limited to 113 games by injuries, but still hit 25 HR and 75 RBI. Pitching was spearheaded by 21-game winner Mudcat Grant, Jim Kaat, and Camilo Pascual.

This was only the second World Series where both teams were located west of the Mississippi River. The first occurred in 1944, when the St. Louis Browns faced their Sportsman's Park tenants, the St. Louis Cardinals.

This was the first of 11 consecutive World Series that did not have the New York Yankees playing in it.

It was also the first series in which both teams had had losing records the previous year. This has since been repeated two other times, both times also involving the Twins—in their championship seasons of 1987 and 1991.

This World Series was the first in which all games were played in cities that did not have National League or American League teams in 1903, the year of the first modern World Series.

Also, it is the earliest World Series whose telecasts are known to survive in their entirety; the CBC has complete kinescopes of all seven games in its archives.

== Summary ==
The Twins won the first two games of the series against Don Drysdale and Sandy Koufax, but once Claude Osteen shut out the Twins in Game 3, things turned around. Willie Davis of The Dodgers tied a World Series record stealing 3 bases in one Game, game 5; the record was set by Honus Wagner in 1909. The Dodgers proceeded to win the three middle games at Dodger Stadium and Koufax would pitch two shutouts including a three-hitter with ten strikeouts to clinch. Ron Fairly hit two home runs for the Dodgers, both in losing efforts.

NL Los Angeles Dodgers (4) vs. AL Minnesota Twins (3)

| Game | Date | Score | Location | Time | Attendance |
|---|---|---|---|---|---|
| 1 | October 6 | Los Angeles Dodgers – 2, Minnesota Twins – 8 | Metropolitan Stadium | 2:29 | 47,797 |
| 2 | October 7 | Los Angeles Dodgers – 1, Minnesota Twins – 5 | Metropolitan Stadium | 2:13 | 48,700 |
| 3 | October 9 | Minnesota Twins – 0, Los Angeles Dodgers – 4 | Dodger Stadium | 2:06 | 55,934 |
| 4 | October 10 | Minnesota Twins – 2, Los Angeles Dodgers – 7 | Dodger Stadium | 2:15 | 55,920 |
| 5 | October 11 | Minnesota Twins – 0, Los Angeles Dodgers – 7 | Dodger Stadium | 2:34 | 55,801 |
| 6 | October 13 | Los Angeles Dodgers – 1, Minnesota Twins – 5 | Metropolitan Stadium | 2:16 | 49,578 |
| 7 | October 14 | Los Angeles Dodgers – 2, Minnesota Twins – 0 | Metropolitan Stadium | 2:27 | 50,596 |

== Matchups ==
=== Game 1 ===
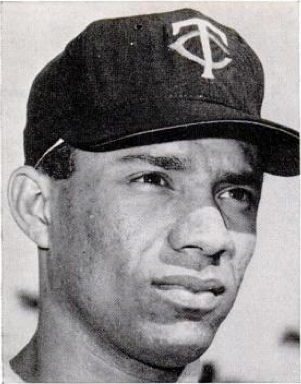
Zoilo Versalles

Wednesday, October 6, 1965 2:00 pm (CT) at Metropolitan Stadium in Bloomington, Minnesota
| Team | 1 | 2 | 3 | 4 | 5 | 6 | 7 | 8 | 9 | R | H | E |
|---|---|---|---|---|---|---|---|---|---|---|---|---|
| Los Angeles | 0 | 1 | 0 | 0 | 0 | 0 | 0 | 0 | 1 | 2 | 10 | 1 |
| Minnesota | 0 | 1 | 6 | 0 | 0 | 1 | 0 | 0 | X | 8 | 10 | 0 |
WP: Mudcat Grant (1–0) LP: Don Drysdale (0–1); Home runs: LAD: Ron Fairly (1); MIN: Don Mincher (1), Zoilo Versalles (1)

Game 1 was set to be a pitching duel between Dodgers' Don Drysdale (23-12, 2.77 ERA on the year) and the Twins' Mudcat Grant (21–7, 3.30). Drysdale was starting because the game fell on Yom Kippur, the holiest day of the year in the Jewish calendar. Dodger ace Sandy Koufax, who is Jewish, stated he would not pitch that day.

In the Twins' third inning any thought of a pitchers' duel was put to rest. Going into that inning, it was 1–1. Coming out, it was 7–1. It started with a Frank Quilici double to left field, followed by an error by Jim Lefebvre, allowing the bunting pitcher Grant to reach. Then, shortstop Zoilo Versalles stepped to the plate. He had hit 19 home runs in the regular season and would later win the AL MVP Award for that year. He crushed a pitch from Drysdale for a three-run home run to make the score, 4–1. However, the Twins' scoring wasn't over. With still no one out, left fielder Sandy Valdespino began things again with a double. One out later, Harmon Killebrew singled, then Don Mincher walked to load the bases. With two out, Earl Battey bloop singled in two unearned runs, and Quilici then singled in another to chase Drysdale. The Twins had jumped out to a six-run lead and would never look back, winning the game 8–2.

Frank Quilici set a World Series record with his two hits in the third inning. Mudcat Grant was the first black World Series game-winner for an American League team.

The Dodgers had scored their runs on a Ron Fairly homer and a Maury Wills bunt single that scored Lefebvre. Grant received the win while Drysdale took the loss.

=== Game 2 ===
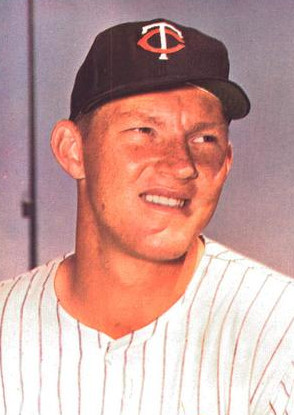
Jim Kaat

Thursday, October 7, 1965 1:00 pm (CT) at Metropolitan Stadium in Bloomington, Minnesota
| Team | 1 | 2 | 3 | 4 | 5 | 6 | 7 | 8 | 9 | R | H | E |
|---|---|---|---|---|---|---|---|---|---|---|---|---|
| Los Angeles | 0 | 0 | 0 | 0 | 0 | 0 | 1 | 0 | 0 | 1 | 7 | 3 |
| Minnesota | 0 | 0 | 0 | 0 | 0 | 2 | 1 | 2 | X | 5 | 9 | 0 |
WP: Jim Kaat (1–0) LP: Sandy Koufax (0–1)

In Game 2, the Twins this time got to Dodger ace Sandy Koufax. Minnesota's pitcher, this time Jim Kaat, again shut down the Dodgers' weak offense. A heavy rain storm soaked Metropolitan Stadium overnight, and the two teams slogged their way through the first five innings. In the top of the fifth, Ron Fairly singled, then left-fielder Bob Allison made a diving, sliding catch of a fly ball off the bat of Jim Lefebvre, preventing a run. Aided by an error, the Twins broke the scoreless tie in the sixth, Versalles hit a missile shot and when Jim Gilliam bobbled the ball at third base, the ball ricocheted off Gilliam and into left field. Versalles reached on the two-base error, then scored on a Tony Oliva double. Killebrew followed with a single, plating Oliva. That is all the runs the Twins would need, though Kaat added insurance in the eighth with a two-run base hit of his own. The Twins went up 2–0 in the Series.

=== Game 3 ===
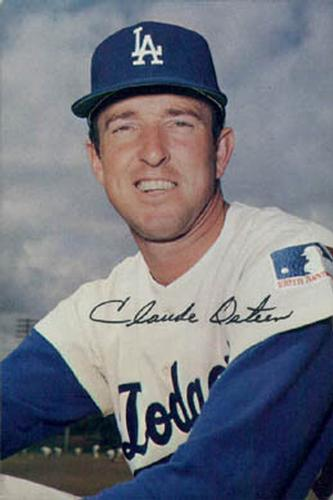
Claude Osteen

Saturday, October 9, 1965 1:00 pm (PT) at Dodger Stadium in Los Angeles, California
| Team | 1 | 2 | 3 | 4 | 5 | 6 | 7 | 8 | 9 | R | H | E |
|---|---|---|---|---|---|---|---|---|---|---|---|---|
| Minnesota | 0 | 0 | 0 | 0 | 0 | 0 | 0 | 0 | 0 | 0 | 5 | 0 |
| Los Angeles | 0 | 0 | 0 | 2 | 1 | 1 | 0 | 0 | X | 4 | 10 | 1 |
WP: Claude Osteen (1–0) LP: Camilo Pascual (0–1)

In Game 3, pressure was on Claude Osteen to have a good start so Los Angeles would not go down 0–3. He faced Camilo Pascual, who had a quality (though somewhat injury plagued) year (9–3, 3.35 ERA). Dodger Stadium was filled to capacity and fans were treated to an appearance from Casey Stengel, a member of the 1916 Dodgers World Series team. Stengel, sans his cane despite a broken hip, hobbled on to the field and threw out the first pitch.

In the first inning, Versalles led off with a double. But with two men on, Versalles was caught stealing home on the front end of an attempted double steal. In the fourth, John Roseboro put the Dodgers on the board with a two-run single. The play cost the Dodgers dearly, Jim Lefebvre bruising his heel crossing the plate with the second of the two runs. The Dodgers, already short on hitting (Lefebvre was batting .400 at the time), went with Dick Tracewski (.118 for the Series) at second base the rest of the way. The Twins received a scare of their own in the seventh inning. Catcher Earl Battey, chasing a popup, collided full speed with the railing used to cover sub-field level "dugout seats" next to the Twins dugout. Battey crumpled in a heap holding his neck and was replaced by Jerry Zimmerman. Los Angeles continued to score runs on a Willie Davis single and a Lou Johnson double in the fifth, then a Wills double in the sixth.

Osteen, who as a pitcher for the Senators had had a perfect 5–0 record against the Twins, completed the game by getting Zimmerman to ground into a double play. He allowed only five hits, succeeding where the Dodger aces hadn't in Games 1 and 2.

=== Game 4 ===
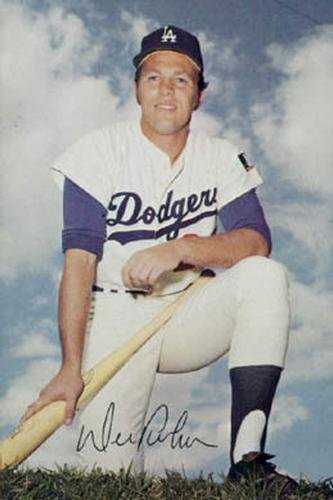
Wes Parker

Sunday, October 10, 1965 1:00 pm (PT) at Dodger Stadium in Los Angeles, California
| Team | 1 | 2 | 3 | 4 | 5 | 6 | 7 | 8 | 9 | R | H | E |
|---|---|---|---|---|---|---|---|---|---|---|---|---|
| Minnesota | 0 | 0 | 0 | 1 | 0 | 1 | 0 | 0 | 0 | 2 | 5 | 2 |
| Los Angeles | 1 | 1 | 0 | 1 | 0 | 3 | 0 | 1 | X | 7 | 10 | 0 |
WP: Don Drysdale (1–1) LP: Mudcat Grant (1–1); Home runs: MIN: Harmon Killebrew (1), Tony Oliva (1); LAD: Wes Parker (1), Lou Johnson (1)

In a rematch of Game 1 pitchers Drysdale and Grant, the Dodgers ace prevailed, allowing only two runs on five hits. He had eleven strikeouts, fanning Jimmie Hall and Don Mincher three times each. Grant gave up three runs in the first five innings, then was removed in the sixth, when the Dodgers got three more.

The Twins opened the game with aggression when Sandy Valdespino tried to stretch a single into a double. Lou Johnson, not known as a great fielder, gunned down Valdespino at second. The Dodgers scored twice without getting the ball out of the infield. Maury Wills collided at first base with Twins second baseman Frank Quilici on an infield single as pitcher Grant was slow to cover the bag. The play cartwheeled Wills backwards, but the Dodger dusted himself off and promptly stole second. Wills went to third on another infield single, this time by the speedy Willie Davis, as Grant was again slow to cover. Wills scored when Ron Fairly beat out a potential double-play grounder.

In the bottom of the second, Dodger speed made up for what seemed a lack of power. Parker bunted a single, then stole second and took third when Grant's throw went wild. Parker scored when Roseboro's grounder to second got through Quilici.

The Dodgers then showed power with Parker and Johnson home runs. The Twins had scored their two runs on home runs from Killebrew and Oliva. Back in form, Drysdale evened the series as L.A. won, 7–2.

=== Game 5 ===
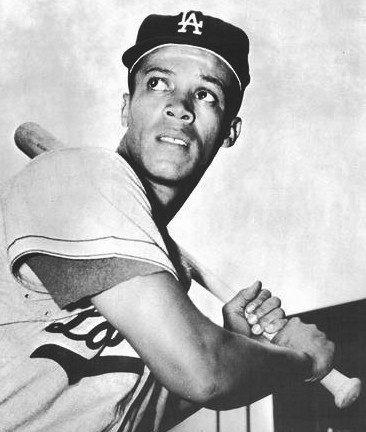
Maury Wills

Monday, October 11, 1965 1:00 pm (PT) at Dodger Stadium in Los Angeles, California
| Team | 1 | 2 | 3 | 4 | 5 | 6 | 7 | 8 | 9 | R | H | E |
|---|---|---|---|---|---|---|---|---|---|---|---|---|
| Minnesota | 0 | 0 | 0 | 0 | 0 | 0 | 0 | 0 | 0 | 0 | 4 | 1 |
| Los Angeles | 2 | 0 | 2 | 1 | 0 | 0 | 2 | 0 | X | 7 | 14 | 0 |
WP: Sandy Koufax (1–1) LP: Jim Kaat (1–1)

In Game 5, the Minnesota pitcher who had done so well in Game 2, Jim Kaat, did not do as well this time, as the Dodgers won their third straight. Koufax gave up only four hits and one walk, striking out ten. Kaat gave up two runs quickly in the first inning, then again in the third. Dave Boswell came in to attempt to stop the bleeding and Jim Perry did the same. Koufax basically put the game out of reach in the seventh, when he helped himself out with an RBI single to score Fairly. The Dodger's win put them up 3–2 in the series.

In the first inning, Dodger speed forced the Twins into fielding mishaps. Wills doubled and Gilliam singled in the run. Willie Davis bunted and third-baseman Killebrew's hurried throw to first went high, enabling the streaking Davis to make it all the way to third and plating Gilliam. The Dodgers collected 14 hits and four stolen bases, while Koufax steadily kept the Twins in check for the shutout.

=== Game 6 ===
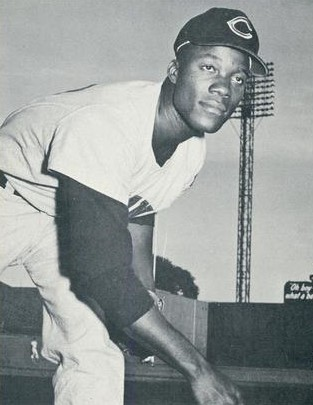
Mudcat Grant

Wednesday, October 13, 1965 2:00 pm (CT) at Metropolitan Stadium in Bloomington, Minnesota
| Team | 1 | 2 | 3 | 4 | 5 | 6 | 7 | 8 | 9 | R | H | E |
|---|---|---|---|---|---|---|---|---|---|---|---|---|
| Los Angeles | 0 | 0 | 0 | 0 | 0 | 0 | 1 | 0 | 0 | 1 | 6 | 1 |
| Minnesota | 0 | 0 | 0 | 2 | 0 | 3 | 0 | 0 | X | 5 | 6 | 1 |
WP: Mudcat Grant (2–1) LP: Claude Osteen (1–1); Home runs: LAD: Ron Fairly (2); MIN: Bob Allison (1), Mudcat Grant (1)

In Game 6, Osteen did not fare as well as he had in his last start. In the fourth inning, Battey reached on an error by Dick Tracewski, followed by a Bob Allison two-run home run. Grant, for the Twins, was on his game once again. He also helped himself, as had Koufax for L.A. the game before, but in this case with a towering three-run home run, after Quilici was intentionally walked to get to Grant. A Fairly home run, his second of the series, put the Dodgers on the board to make the score 5–1, but that's all they would get as Grant pitched a complete game.

Twins manager Sam Mele chose to leave veteran pitchers Camilo Pascual and Jim Perry and youngster Jim Merritt in the bullpen, instead going with Grant on two days' rest. Twins catcher Earl Battey brought the nearly 50,000 Metropolitan Stadium fans to their feet by leading off the second inning with a triple past a diving Willie Davis in center. Battey showed no outward ill-effects of his collision with the railing in Game 3, diving headfirst into third base on the play. However, he didn´t score, as Osteen struck out Allison and Quilici. Battey continued his fine play in the fourth by hustling to first when Tracewski booted his groundball, and Allison followed with a home run. Grant pitched solidly and the Twins tied the series at 3–3.

In this game, Mudcat Grant became just the seventh pitcher to homer in a World Series game.

=== Game 7 ===
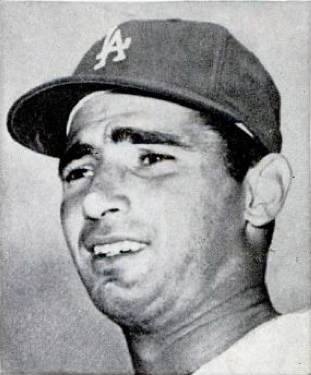
Sandy Koufax

Thursday, October 14, 1965 2:00 pm (CT) at Metropolitan Stadium in Bloomington, Minnesota
| Team | 1 | 2 | 3 | 4 | 5 | 6 | 7 | 8 | 9 | R | H | E |
|---|---|---|---|---|---|---|---|---|---|---|---|---|
| Los Angeles | 0 | 0 | 0 | 2 | 0 | 0 | 0 | 0 | 0 | 2 | 7 | 0 |
| Minnesota | 0 | 0 | 0 | 0 | 0 | 0 | 0 | 0 | 0 | 0 | 3 | 1 |
WP: Sandy Koufax (2–1) LP: Jim Kaat (1–2); Home runs: LAD: Lou Johnson (2); MIN: None

Dodger manager Walt Alston was torn between starting Drysdale on normal rest or Koufax with only two days' rest. He decided on the left-handed Koufax, figuring if needed he would use the right-handed Drysdale in relief, then go back to his left-handed relief ace Ron Perranoski. Koufax told announcer Vin Scully in a post-game interview that he and Drysdale had come to the ballpark not knowing which one would be on the mound (though other sources indicated that Alston had informed Koufax the day before but asked him to keep it a secret). According to Koufax, the manager announced the decision purely in strategic terms regarding lefty vs. righty, saying he worded his announcement without even using the pitchers' names, saying only that he thought he'd "like to start the left-hander." The Twins went with Jim Kaat, also starting on two days' rest after losing game 5. Both managers had relief pitchers warming up as their starters began the game.

Koufax had trouble throwing his curveball for strikes but escaped a couple of early jams, including two walks in the first inning and an unusual incident in the third inning when Zoilo Versalles appeared to have stolen second base with one out, but was ordered back to first after batter Joe Nossek was ruled out for interference. Koufax effectively gave up on his curveball and pitched the late innings almost exclusively with fastballs, still baffling the hard-hitting Twins. In the fourth inning, Dodger left fielder Lou Johnson told Koufax that he would get him the only run he would need. Johnson promptly hit a home run off the left-field foul pole to give the Dodgers a 1–0 lead. Ron Fairly followed with a double and scored on a Wes Parker single. The two runs came on three consecutive pitches.

Knowing Kaat was on short rest, manager Sam Mele pulled him quickly. Al Worthington, Johnny Klippstein, Jim Merritt, and Jim Perry combined to shut out the Dodgers for the rest of the game. The Twins threatened again in the fifth inning when they had runners on first and second with only one out. Versalles hit a hard grounder down the third base line that appeared to be going for a game-tying double. This could have ended Koufax's day as Drysdale was warming up in the bullpen and ready to go. But third baseman Jim Gilliam (who was often replaced late in games for defensive reasons) made a diving, backhanded stop and stepped on third for a force. Koufax bore down and got the third out. He ended up tossing a three-hit shutout, striking out ten in one of the greatest Game 7 pitching performances ever.

"Sweet Lou" Johnson hit two home runs, including the game-winner in the clinching Game 7.

No relief pitchers were used by the winning team in any game of this series; the winning starting pitcher went the distance in all seven games. This had not happened since 1940, and has never been repeated since.

The Twins' loss in Game 7 remains the only World Series game the Twins have lost at home, having later won all their home games in 1987 and 1991. Through 2026, the Twins have never won a road World Series Game (not including when the franchise was the original Washington Senators).

The National League won its third consecutive World Series (Dodgers in 1963, St. Louis Cardinals in 1964). The Senior Circuit would not claim back-to-back titles again until 1975 and 1976, when the Cincinnati Reds won both.

Although the Dodgers had played the maximum seven games in four best-of-seven World Series when they were located in Brooklyn (in 1947, 1952, 1955, and 1956), 1965 marked the first time they had done so when located in Los Angeles. It did not happen again until 2017, and again in 2025. The Brooklyn Dodgers had also played seven games in the 1920 World Series when it was a best-of-nine series, losing to Cleveland five games to two.

This was the third World Series involving the Dodgers where the home team won the first six games before the visiting team won the seventh. It occurred in 1955 and 1956 vs. the Yankees, with the Dodgers winning the former at Yankee Stadium and losing the latter at Ebbets Field. The pattern repeated in 1971, when the Pittsburgh Pirates prevailed over the Baltimore Orioles.

== Composite line score ==
1965 World Series (4–3): Los Angeles Dodgers (N.L.) over Minnesota Twins (A.L.)

| Team | 1 | 2 | 3 | 4 | 5 | 6 | 7 | 8 | 9 | R | H | E |
|---|---|---|---|---|---|---|---|---|---|---|---|---|
| Los Angeles Dodgers | 3 | 2 | 2 | 6 | 1 | 4 | 4 | 1 | 1 | 24 | 64 | 6 |
| Minnesota Twins | 0 | 1 | 6 | 3 | 0 | 7 | 1 | 2 | 0 | 20 | 42 | 5 |
Total attendance: 364,326 Average attendance: 52,047; Winning player's share: $10,297 Losing player's share: $6,634

== Aftermath ==
The Dodgers would return to the World Series the following year, only to be swept in four straight games by the Baltimore Orioles. The Dodgers scored twice in Game 1, but those would be only runs they would score in the entire series. Despite being at the peak of his career, Sandy Koufax retired after the series at age 30, due to chronic arthritis and bursitis in his pitching elbow. The Dodgers would win their next championship in 1981 over their archrival in the New York Yankees in six games after overcoming a two-games-to-none series deficit.

The Twins would make the inaugural MLB Postseason field in 1969, but were swept by the Baltimore Orioles in the first ALCS. They would return to the World Series in 1987, and won their first championship since 1924 (known then as the Washington Senators) over the St. Louis Cardinals in seven games after being five innings away from elimination in Game 7. That series was the first series in which the home team won all games, a feat Sandy Koufax prevented in Game 7 of this series. Since the 1987 Series, that feat has been successfully accomplished twice more in 1991 (also involving the Twins, this time defeating the Atlanta Braves) and 2001 (In which the Arizona Diamondbacks defeated the New York Yankees).

This would be the final World Series where both teams' uniforms only featured numbers. All World Series since 1966 have featured at least one team with names on the uniform.

Umpire Eddie Hurley, who worked home plate in games 1 and 7, was forced to retire following the Series by American League president Joe Cronin due to having surpassed the new mandatory retirement age of 55. Hurley was the home plate umpire when St. Louis Browns owner Bill Veeck sent 3-foot-7 midget Eddie Gaedel to bat in a 1951 game vs. the Detroit Tigers.

Three umpires in this series—American League's Red Flaherty, Bob Stewart and National League's Tony Venzon—all worked the 1969 Major League Baseball All-Star Game, and the 1970 World Series; while the other two National League umpires Ed Sudol and Ed Vargo were both on the crew for the 1969 National League Championship Series, the 1971 World Series, the 1973 National League Championship Series, and the 1974 Major League Baseball All-Star Game.

This would also be the final World Series where Ford Frick was the commissioner of baseball.

== See also ==
- 1965 Japan Series
