= Ed Vargo =

American baseball umpire (1928-2008)

- Ed Vargo
- Born: September 17, 1928; Butler, Pennsylvania, U.S.
- Died: February 2, 2008 (aged 79); Butler, Pennsylvania, U.S.

Edward Paul Vargo (September 17, 1928 – February 2, 2008) was an American umpire in Major League Baseball who worked in the National League from 1960 to 1983. He officiated in the World Series, National League Championship Series and All-Star Game four times each, and also worked a number of other historic games. His 3,555 total games ranked ninth in NL history when he retired. During most of his career, Vargo wore uniform number 20.

Vargo, of Hungarian and Ukrainian descent, was born the youngest son of Alex and Mary Vargo in the Pittsburgh suburb of Butler, Pennsylvania, where he continued to live throughout his life. In his youth he worked as a batboy and equipment manager with the Butler Yankees of the Class-D Pennsylvania State Association. After briefly playing as a catcher in the St. Louis Cardinals system, he served five years in the Army, where he began umpiring, and began his professional career in the Georgia–Florida League (1953–54, 1956), Piedmont League (1955), Eastern League (1957) and International League (1957–59). In his second year in the NL, he was rated the neatest umpire in the league in a Sporting News poll of writers, managers and coaches. He married Elizabeth Joan (Betty) Hunter on February 9, 1963; they had four children, sons Edward and David and daughters Karen and Kristin.

Vargo officiated in the World Series in 1965, 1971, 1978 and 1983, serving as crew chief in 1978. He worked the NLCS in 1969 (the first NLCS), 1973, 1976 and 1980, and the All-Star Game in 1961 (first game), 1966, 1974 and 1981. He was the home plate umpire for Game 4 of the 1971 World Series, the Fall Classic's first night game.

He officiated in eight no-hitters, calling three of them from behind the plate: Don Nottebart's 4–1 win for the Houston Colt .45s over the Philadelphia Phillies on May 17, 1963; Sandy Koufax's record-tying third no-hitter on June 4, 1964, a 3–0 Los Angeles Dodgers win over the Phillies; and Koufax's perfect game on September 9, 1965, a 1–0 win over the Chicago Cubs. Vargo is the only umpire to call no-hitters in three consecutive seasons, and one of only two umpires to call a no-hitter and perfect game by the same pitcher. (Eric Cooper has since joined him, calling balls and strikes for Mark Buehrle's two no-hitters; the perfect game was the latter of the two.) Vargo was also behind the plate on April 4, 1974, when Hank Aaron tied Babe Ruth's record of 714 career home runs. The jacket he wore for Koufax's perfect game, Aaron's record-tying game and the first World Series night game in 1971 was donated to the Baseball Hall of Fame by amateur umpire Ray Gouley, to whom Vargo had given it, once Gouley learned of its significance.

After retiring from umpiring, Vargo became a National League supervisor until 1997; he was inducted into the Western Pennsylvania Sports Hall of Fame in 1994. He died at his home in Butler at age 79, and was buried in Butler County Memorial Park Cemetery.

== See also ==
- List of Major League Baseball umpires (disambiguation)
