= 1969 Major League Baseball All-Star Game =

1969 American baseball competition

	1	2	3	4	5	6	7	8	9	R	H	E
National League	1	2	5	1	0	0	0	0	0	9	11	0
American League	0	1	1	1	0	0	0	0	0	3	6	2
- Date: July 23, 1969
- Venue: Robert F. Kennedy Memorial Stadium
- City: Washington, D.C.
- Managers: Red Schoendienst (STL); Mayo Smith (DET)
- MVP: Willie McCovey (SF)
- Attendance: 45,259
- Ceremonial first pitch: Vice President Spiro Agnew
- Television: NBC
- TV announcers: Curt Gowdy, Tony Kubek, and Mickey Mantle
- Radio: NBC
- Radio announcers: Jim Simpson and Sandy Koufax

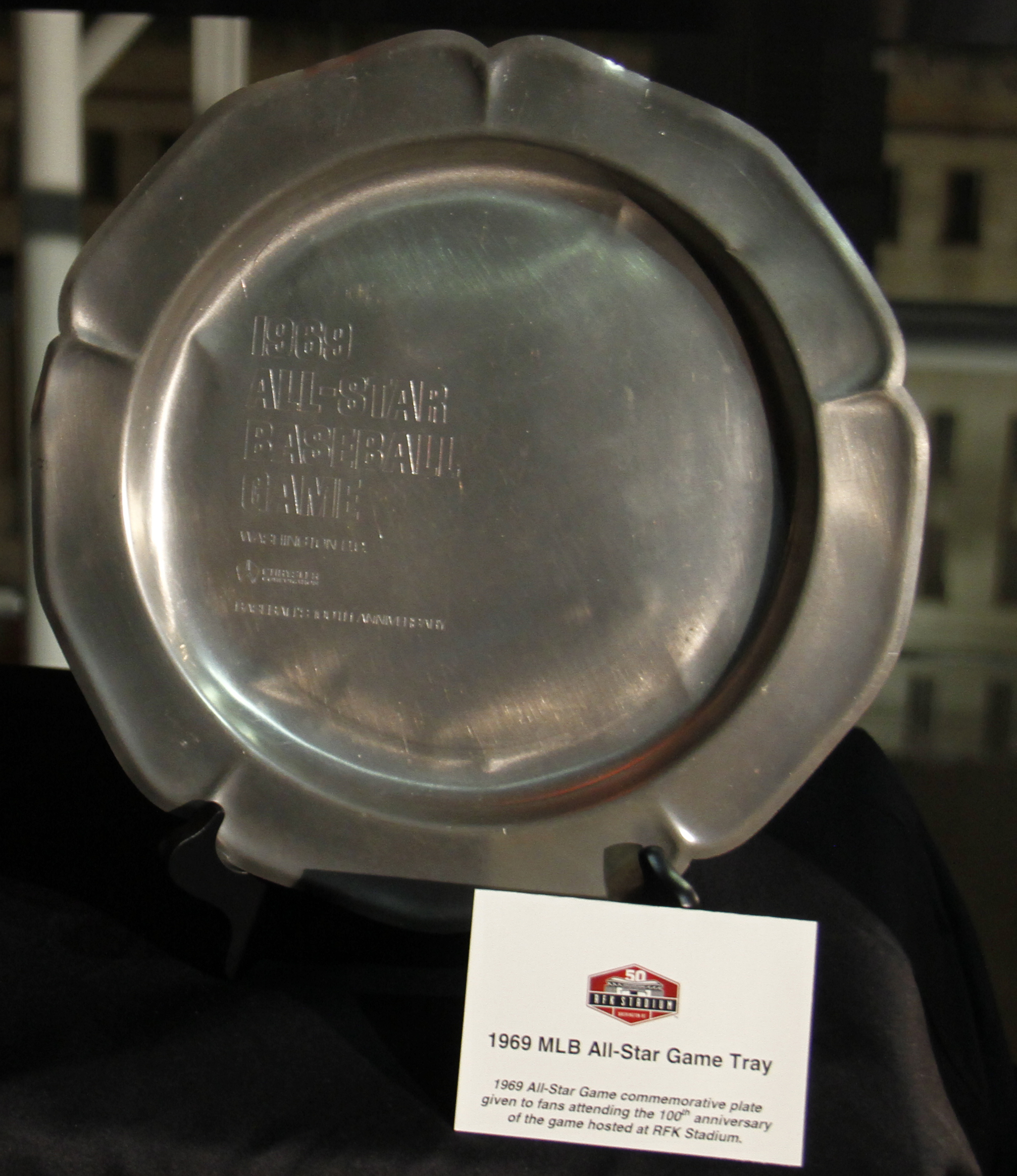
Souvenir tray commemorating the game

The 1969 Major League Baseball All-Star Game was the 40th midseason exhibition between the all-stars of the American League (AL) and the National League (NL), the two leagues comprising Major League Baseball. The game was played in the afternoon on Wednesday, July 23, at Robert F. Kennedy Memorial Stadium in Washington, D.C., and resulted in a 9–3 victory for the National League. Steve Carlton was the winning pitcher while Mel Stottlemyre was the losing pitcher.

The game was originally scheduled for the evening of Tuesday, July 22, but heavy rains forced its postponement to the following afternoon. The 1969 contest remains the last All-Star Game to date to be played earlier than prime time in the Eastern United States.

President Richard Nixon originally planned to attend the Tuesday night game and throw out the first ball, and then depart for the splashdown of Apollo 11 in the Pacific Ocean. But with the game's postponement until Wednesday afternoon, Nixon missed the game altogether and Vice President Spiro Agnew attended instead.

== Game summary ==
After scoring in the first inning on an error, the National League made it 3–0 in the second inning against AL starter Mel Stottlemyre on a two-run homer by Reds' catcher Johnny Bench. Denny McLain was scheduled as the American League starter, but was late arriving to the stadium (via his own airplane) and pitched later in the game.

Five more runs came across for the NL in the third inning, Blue Moon Odom of Oakland surrendering all. Willie McCovey's two-run homer and back-to-back doubles by Félix Millán and pitcher Steve Carlton were the key blows.

McCovey added another home run in the fourth, and was voted the game's most valuable player.

== Starting lineup ==
National League				American League			
Order	Player	Team	Position	Order	Player	Team	Position
1	Matty Alou	Pirates	OF	1	Rod Carew	Twins	2B
2	Don Kessinger	Cubs	SS	2	Reggie Jackson	Athletics	OF
3	Hank Aaron	Braves	OF	3	Frank Robinson	Orioles	OF
4	Willie McCovey	Giants	1B	4	Boog Powell	Orioles	1B
5	Ron Santo	Cubs	3B	5	Frank Howard	Senators	OF
6	Cleon Jones	Mets	OF	6	Sal Bando	Athletics	3B
7	Johnny Bench	Reds	C	7	Rico Petrocelli	Red Sox	SS
8	Félix Millán	Braves	2B	8	Bill Freehan	Tigers	C
9	Steve Carlton	Cardinals	P	9	Mel Stottlemyre	Yankees	P

== Reserves ==
=== American League ===
==== Pitchers ====
Throws	Pitcher	Team	Notes
RH	Ray Culp	Boston Red Sox
LH	Darold Knowles	Washington Senators
LH	Mickey Lolich	Detroit Tigers	Did not pitch
LH	Sam McDowell	Cleveland Indians
RH	Denny McLain	Detroit Tigers
LH	Dave McNally	Baltimore Orioles
RH	Blue Moon Odom	Oakland Athletics

==== Position players ====
Position	Player	Team	Notes
C	Ellie Rodríguez	Kansas City Royals	Did not play
C	John Roseboro	Minnesota Twins
1B	Don Mincher	Seattle Pilots	Replaced Mike Hegan
1B	Harmon Killebrew	Minnesota Twins
2B	Mike Andrews	Boston Red Sox	Replaced Davey Johnson
2B	Davey Johnson	Baltimore Orioles	Injured, did not play
3B	Brooks Robinson	Baltimore Orioles
SS	Jim Fregosi	California Angels
OF	Paul Blair	Baltimore Orioles
OF	Mike Hegan	Seattle Pilots	Injured, did not play
OF	Carlos May	Chicago White Sox
OF	Tony Oliva	Minnesota Twins	Injured, did not play
OF	Reggie Smith	Boston Red Sox
OF	Roy White	New York Yankees
OF	Carl Yastrzemski	Boston Red Sox

=== National League ===
==== Pitchers ====
Throws	Pitcher	Team	Notes
RH	Larry Dierker	Houston Astros
RH	Bob Gibson	St. Louis Cardinals
LH	Grant Jackson	Philadelphia Phillies	Did not pitch
RH	Jerry Koosman	New York Mets
RH	Juan Marichal	San Francisco Giants	Did not pitch
RH	Phil Niekro	Atlanta Braves
RH	Tom Seaver	New York Mets	Did not pitch
RH	Bill Singer	Los Angeles Dodgers

==== Position players ====
Position	Player	Team	Notes
C	Chris Cannizzaro	San Diego Padres	Did not play
C	Randy Hundley	Chicago Cubs
1B	Ernie Banks	Chicago Cubs
1B	Lee May	Cincinnati Reds
2B	Glenn Beckert	Chicago Cubs
3B	Tony Pérez	Cincinnati Reds
SS	Denis Menke	Houston Astros
OF	Roberto Clemente	Pittsburgh Pirates
OF	Willie Mays	San Francisco Giants
OF	Pete Rose	Cincinnati Reds
OF	Rusty Staub	Montreal Expos	Did not play

== Umpires ==
Position	Umpire
Home Plate	Red Flaherty (AL)
First Base	Augie Donatelli (NL)
Second Base	Bob Stewart (AL)
Third Base	Tom Gorman (NL)
Left Field	Marty Springstead (AL)
Right Field	Tony Venzon (NL)

== Line score ==
Wednesday, July 23, 1969 1:45 pm (ET) at Robert F. Kennedy Memorial Stadium in Washington, D.C.
Team	1	2	3	4	5	6	7	8	9	R	H	E
National League	1	2	5	1	0	0	0	0	0	9	11	0
American League	0	1	1	1	0	0	0	0	0	3	6	2
WP: Steve Carlton (1-0) LP: Mel Stottlemyre (0-1) Sv: Phil Niekro (1)
