= 1965 in baseball =

The following are the baseball events of the year 1965 throughout the world.

== Champions ==
=== Major League Baseball ===
- World Series: Los Angeles Dodgers over Minnesota Twins (4–3); Sandy Koufax, MVP
- All-Star Game, July 13 at Metropolitan Stadium: National League, 6–5; Juan Marichal, MVP

=== Other champions ===
- College World Series: Arizona State
- Japan Series: Yomiuri Giants over Nankai Hawks (4–1)
- Little League World Series: Windsor Locks, Connecticut
- Senior League World Series: Monterrey, Mexico

== Awards and honors ==
- Baseball Hall of Fame
  - Pud Galvin

Baseball Writers' Association of America Awards
| BBWAA Award | National League | American League |
|---|---|---|
| Rookie of the Year | Jim Lefebvre (LAD) | Curt Blefary (BAL) |
| Cy Young Award | Sandy Koufax (LAD) | — |
| Most Valuable Player | Willie Mays (SF) | Zoilo Versalles (MIN) |
Gold Glove Awards
| Position | National League | American League |
| Pitcher | Bob Gibson (STL) | Jim Kaat (MIN) |
| Catcher | Joe Torre (MIL) | Bill Freehan (DET) |
| 1st Base | Bill White (STL) | Joe Pepitone (NYY) |
| 2nd Base | Bill Mazeroski (PIT) | Bobby Richardson (NYY) |
| 3rd Base | Ron Santo (CHC) | Brooks Robinson (BAL) |
| Shortstop | Leo Cárdenas (CIN) | Zoilo Versalles (MIN) |
| Outfield | Roberto Clemente (PIT) | Al Kaline (DET) |
| Outfield | Curt Flood (STL) | Tom Tresh (NYY) |
| Outfield | Willie Mays (SF) | Carl Yastrzemski (BOS) |

== Statistical leaders ==
Hall of Famer Sandy Koufax

| | American League | | National League | |
| Stat | Player | Total | Player | Total |
|---|---|---|---|---|
| AVG | Tony Oliva (MIN) | .321 | Roberto Clemente (PIT) | .329 |
| HR | Tony Conigliaro (BOS) | 49 | Willie Mays (SF) | 52 |
| RBI | Rocky Colavito (CLE) | 108 | Deron Johnson (CIN) | 130 |
| W | Mudcat Grant (MIN) | 21 | Sandy Koufax^{1} (LAD) | 26 |
| ERA | Sam McDowell (CLE) | 2.18 | Sandy Koufax^{1} (LAD) | 2.04 |
| K | Sam McDowell (CLE) | 325 | Sandy Koufax^{1} (LAD) | 382 |

^{1}Major league Triple Crown pitching winner

== Major league baseball final standings ==
=== American League final standings ===
American League
| Team | W | L | Pct. | GB | Home | Road |
|---|---|---|---|---|---|---|
| Minnesota Twins | 102 | 60 | .630 | — | 51‍–‍30 | 51‍–‍30 |
| Chicago White Sox | 95 | 67 | .586 | 7 | 48‍–‍33 | 47‍–‍34 |
| Baltimore Orioles | 94 | 68 | .580 | 8 | 46‍–‍33 | 48‍–‍35 |
| Detroit Tigers | 89 | 73 | .549 | 13 | 47‍–‍34 | 42‍–‍39 |
| Cleveland Indians | 87 | 75 | .537 | 15 | 52‍–‍30 | 35‍–‍45 |
| New York Yankees | 77 | 85 | .475 | 25 | 40‍–‍43 | 37‍–‍42 |
| Los Angeles / California Angels | 75 | 87 | .463 | 27 | 46‍–‍34 | 29‍–‍53 |
| Washington Senators | 70 | 92 | .432 | 32 | 36‍–‍45 | 34‍–‍47 |
| Boston Red Sox | 62 | 100 | .383 | 40 | 34‍–‍47 | 28‍–‍53 |
| Kansas City Athletics | 59 | 103 | .364 | 43 | 33‍–‍48 | 26‍–‍55 |

Locations of teams for the 1965 American League season
American League

=== National League final standings ===
National League
| Team | W | L | Pct. | GB | Home | Road |
|---|---|---|---|---|---|---|
| Los Angeles Dodgers | 97 | 65 | .599 | — | 50‍–‍31 | 47‍–‍34 |
| San Francisco Giants | 95 | 67 | .586 | 2 | 51‍–‍30 | 44‍–‍37 |
| Pittsburgh Pirates | 90 | 72 | .556 | 7 | 49‍–‍32 | 41‍–‍40 |
| Cincinnati Reds | 89 | 73 | .549 | 8 | 49‍–‍32 | 40‍–‍41 |
| Milwaukee Braves | 86 | 76 | .531 | 11 | 44‍–‍37 | 42‍–‍39 |
| Philadelphia Phillies | 85 | 76 | .528 | 11½ | 45‍–‍35 | 40‍–‍41 |
| St. Louis Cardinals | 80 | 81 | .497 | 16½ | 42‍–‍39 | 38‍–‍42 |
| Chicago Cubs | 72 | 90 | .444 | 25 | 40‍–‍41 | 32‍–‍49 |
| Houston Astros | 65 | 97 | .401 | 32 | 36‍–‍45 | 29‍–‍52 |
| New York Mets | 50 | 112 | .309 | 47 | 29‍–‍52 | 21‍–‍60 |

Locations of teams for the 1965 National League season
National League

== Nippon Professional Baseball final standings ==
=== Central League final standings ===
| Central League | G | W | L | T | Pct. | GB |
|---|---|---|---|---|---|---|
| Yomiuri Giants | 140 | 91 | 47 | 2 | .659 | — |
| Chunichi Dragons | 140 | 77 | 59 | 4 | .566 | 13.0 |
| Hanshin Tigers | 140 | 71 | 66 | 3 | .518 | 19.5 |
| Taiyo Whales | 140 | 68 | 70 | 2 | .493 | 23.0 |
| Hiroshima Carp | 140 | 59 | 77 | 4 | .434 | 31.0 |
| Sankei Swallows | 140 | 44 | 91 | 5 | .326 | 45.5 |

=== Pacific League final standings ===
| Pacific League | G | W | L | T | Pct. | GB |
|---|---|---|---|---|---|---|
| Nankai Hawks | 140 | 88 | 49 | 3 | .642 | — |
| Toei Flyers | 140 | 76 | 61 | 3 | .555 | 12.0 |
| Nishitetsu Lions | 140 | 72 | 64 | 4 | .529 | 15.5 |
| Hankyu Braves | 140 | 67 | 71 | 2 | .486 | 21.5 |
| Tokyo Orions | 140 | 62 | 74 | 4 | .456 | 25.5 |
| Kintetsu Buffaloes | 140 | 46 | 92 | 2 | .333 | 42.5 |

== Events ==
=== January ===
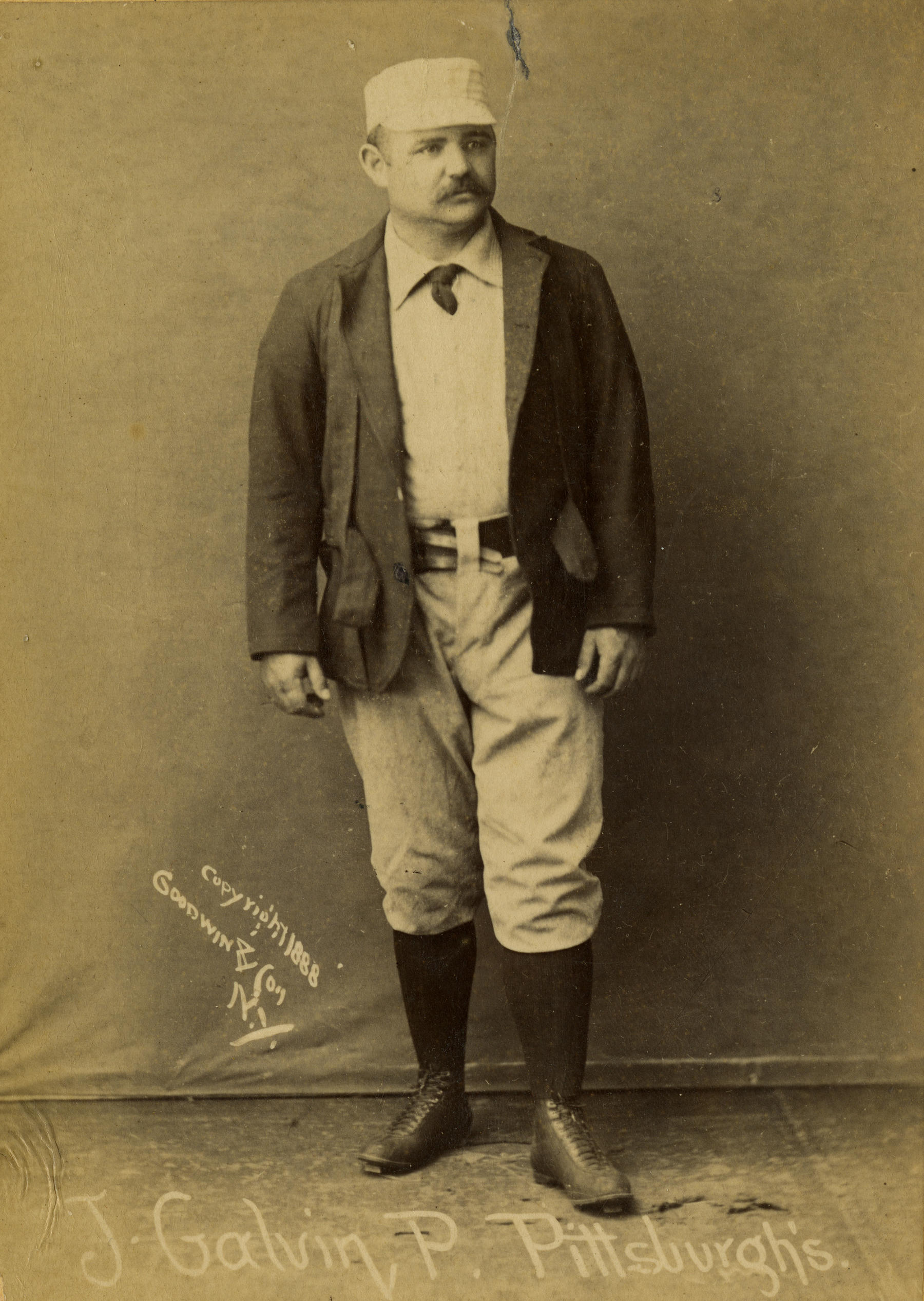
James "Pud" Galvin

- January 3 – As he enters his 14th and final year as Commissioner, Ford Frick warns that "Organized Baseball" must confront four serious issues: the "problem of television," the disparity in revenues between rich and poor clubs, orderly expansion, and the corporate ownership of MLB teams. Frick, 70, became Commissioner in September 1951 and has presided over seven franchise relocations, expansion from 16 to 20 teams, and MLB's evolution from a "relatively simple operation" to "big business."
- January 8 – Two feuding executives, Kansas City Athletics owner Charles O. Finley and his long-ago-ousted general manager (GM), "Frantic Frank" Lane, reach a $113,000 settlement in Lane's breach-of-contract lawsuit against Finley. Lane had been summarily fired in August 1961, seven months after Finley, in his first month as owner of the Athletics, signed him to an eight-year contract to head the club's baseball operations. His legal victory also enables Lane, 69, to return to baseball; he becomes a "superscout" for the Baltimore Orioles.
- January 15 – The Chicago Cubs reacquire former National League All-Star outfielder George Altman from the New York Mets for outfielder Billy Cowan.
- January 16 – Willie Mays remains baseball's highest-paid player when the San Francisco Giants sign the 33-year-old, future Hall of Famer to a $105,000 contract for the coming season. In 1964, Mays led the National League in home runs (47), was named an All-Star for the 11th consecutive season, and won his eighth straight Gold Glove Award.
- January 20
  - Rocky Colavito, the slugging outfielder whose April 1960 trade from the Cleveland Indians was decried by fans and media in that city, returns to the Tribe as the centerpiece of a three-team, eight-player trade also involving the Kansas City Athletics and Chicago White Sox. He will put up strong numbers for Cleveland in 1965 (.287, 26 HR, and an American League-best 108 RBI in 162 games played); the Indians improve by eight games to an 87–75 record, and home attendance (934,786) is their largest since 1960.
    - In the complicated, multi-player transaction, Kansas City trades Colavito to Cleveland and receives pitcher Fred Talbot (as a "player to be named later" or PTBNL) and outfielders Mike Hershberger and Jim Landis from the White Sox; and Chicago gains pitcher Tommy John, catcher John Romano and outfielder Tommie Agee from Cleveland in exchange for catcher Cam Carreon.
    - In Chicago, both John, 21, and Agee, 22, will blossom into MLB stars. John, only 2–11 (3.61) in 31 games with the Indians, becomes a top-of-the-rotation starting pitcher en route to a 26-year, 288-win MLB career, and the namesake for groundbreaking elbow surgery performed by Dr. Frank Jobe in 1974. Agee wins the 1966 American League Rookie of the Year Award and etches his name in New York Mets history for his brilliant defense in the 1969 World Series.
- January 26 – Demolition begins on Griffith Stadium, which had been the home to the American League's two Washington Senators franchises from 1911 through 1961.
- January 31
  - Pitcher Pud Galvin is chosen for Hall of Fame induction by the Special Veterans Committee. Galvin (1856–1902) won 365 games in four different "major" leagues between 1875 and 1892.
  - The newly-renamed Houston Astros sign future All-Star first baseman and front-office executive Bob Watson, 18, as an amateur free-agent.

=== February ===
- February 1 – The San Francisco Giants reacquire catcher Ed Bailey from the Milwaukee Braves for left-hander Billy O'Dell. The left-handed-hitting Bailey is a six-time former NL All-Star.
- February 10 – The government of Colombia touches off an international incident when it excludes defending champion Cuba from the 1965 Amateur World Series to be held in Cartagena and Barranquilla. The government of Fidel Castro denounces Colombia's denial of visas to Cuban players as a "counter-revolutionary plot." Colombia will win the competition February 27 by defeating Mexico, two games to one, in the championship round.
- February 11 – The San Francisco Giants send another veteran catcher, right-handed-hitting Del Crandall, an 11× All-Star and 4× Gold Glove Award winner, to the Pittsburgh Pirates for pitcher Bob Priddy and first baseman Bob Burda.

=== March ===
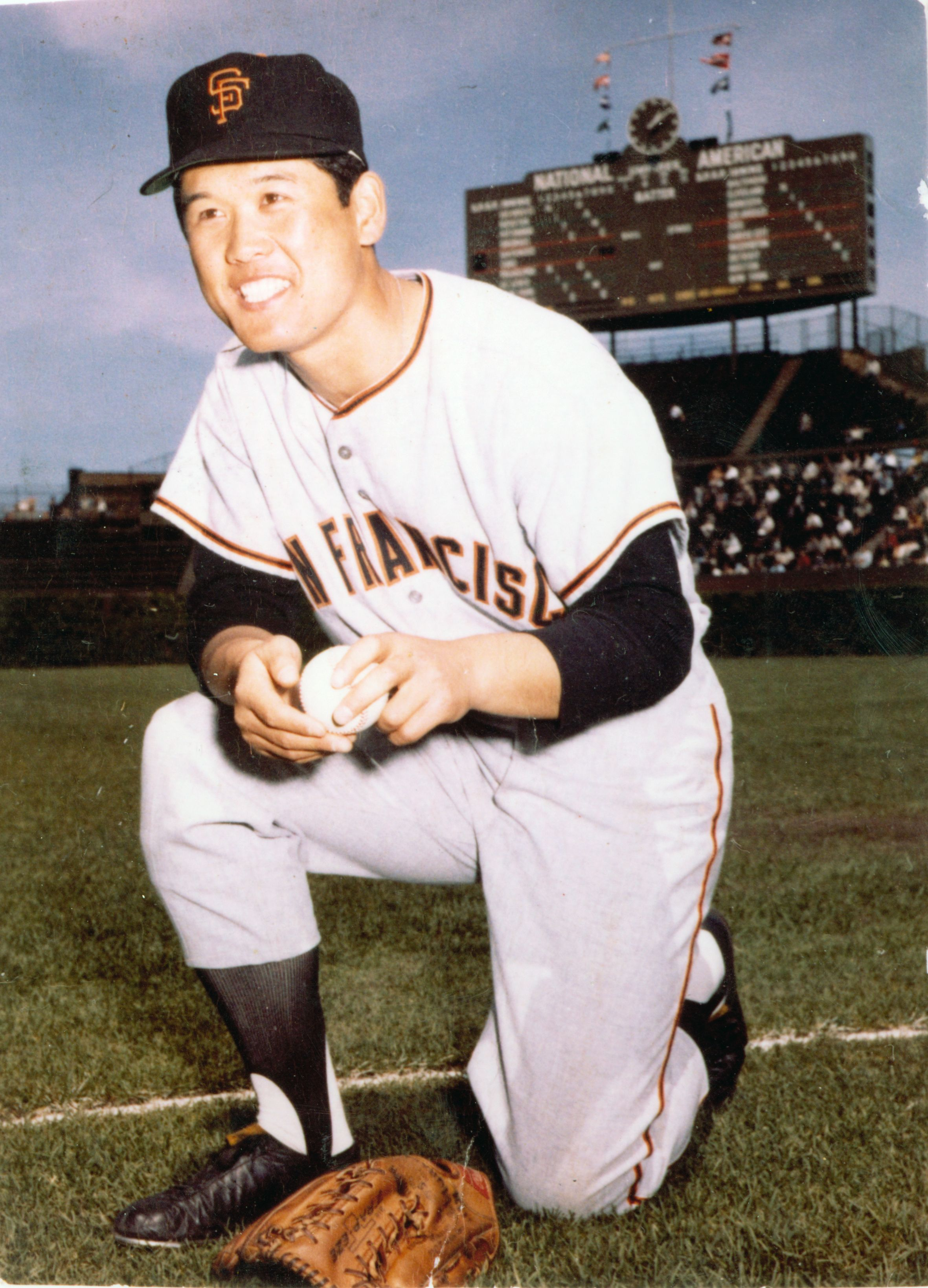
Masanori Murakami

- March 1 – The 1965 season marks a new era in Major League Baseball's relationship with television, with income from local and network broadcasts exceeding $25 million, a 39% increase compared to 1964. Eighty percent of the new revenue comes from a new, national "Game of the Week" contract with ABC Sports, with the broadcasts set to debut in April.
- March 9
  - Detroit Tigers manager Chuck Dressen, 70, suffers a heart attack at the Tigers' spring training camp in Lakeland, Florida; third-base coach Bob Swift takes the reins as interim pilot until Dressen is able to return to the dugout May 31.
  - Legendary Mel Allen, fired as the "Voice of the New York Yankees" last December, is named lead announcer for a special radio and television team that will broadcast 73 Milwaukee Braves games to Atlanta fans during the upcoming season. The Braves are entering what appears to be their lame-duck campaign in Wisconsin before moving to Georgia—pending the outcome of a legal battle.
- March 16 – The commissioners of "Organized Baseball" and Nippon Professional Baseball resolve a dispute over the services of Masanori Murakami when it's agreed that the 20-year-old southpaw, the first Japanese player to appear in the major leagues, will pitch for the San Francisco Giants in 1965, but rejoin the Nankai Hawks for 1966. Murakami will go 4–1 (3.75) with eight saves in 45 games for the 1965 Giants before returning to Japan for the remainder of his active career. It will be 29 years before Hideo Nomo becomes the next Japanese pitcher to hurl in the North American majors.
- March 21 – At spring training, New York Mets pitchers Gary Kroll and Gordie Richardson combine for a nine-inning no-hitter during a 6–0 win over the Pittsburgh Pirates in St. Petersburg.
- March 30 – In need of a centerfielder, the Boston Red Sox purchase the contract of nine-year AL veteran Lenny Green from the Baltimore Orioles.

=== April ===
- April 2 – Dr. Robert Kerlan, orthopaedic surgeon and team physician of the Los Angeles Dodgers, reveals that Sandy Koufax suffers from a "traumatic arthritic condition of his left [pitching] elbow". The news stirs speculation that the Hall-of-Fame-bound superstar won't be ready to start the Dodgers' Opening Day game, April 12 at Shea Stadium against the New York Mets. Noting the "incurable" nature of arthritis, Kerlan says: "We will try to get him to the point where he can play with this condition."
  - Koufax, 29, indeed misses the Dodgers' opener—Don Drysdale starts and gets the win—but he makes his first 1965 appearance at Connie Mack Stadium on April 18 in his club's fourth game, and throws a complete-game, 6–2 victory over the Philadelphia Phillies. He goes on to start 40 more games—going 26–8 (2.04), hurling a personal-best 3352/3 innings pitched and 27 total complete games (including a perfect game), and setting a new MLB strikeout record (382).
- April 4 – The Washington Senators acquire left-hander Mike McCormick from the Baltimore Orioles for a minor-league pitcher and $20,000. Former bonus baby McCormick, 26, led the National League in ERA in 1960, but has struggled with shoulder problems since 1962. Given a new chance in Washington, he will reinvent himself during 1965 and 1966; then, he'll be traded back to the NL and his original team, the San Francisco Giants, for whom he'll win 22 games in 1967 and his circuit's Cy Young Award.
- April 9 – U. S. President Lyndon Johnson is on hand for an exhibition game between the New York Yankees and recently renamed Houston Astros. It is the first game to be played indoors at the new Harris County Domed Stadium, which will soon be called the Astrodome.
- April 11 – The Cleveland Indians sell the contract of veteran relief pitcher Ted Abernathy to the Chicago Cubs. In his debut National League season, "submariner" Abernathy, 32, will lead the NL in games pitched (84), games finished (62) and saves (32).
- April 12
  - The first official game at the Astrodome is played in front of over 43,000 fans, as they watch the Philadelphia Phillies defeat the host Astros, 2–0.
  - At light-less Wrigley Field's Opening Day, the St. Louis Cardinals and Chicago Cubs play to an eleven-inning, 10–10 tie when the game is called because of darkness. It goes into the books as a tie game, and all individual and team statistics stay on the books as official. The game includes Steve Carlton's debut MLB appearance; the St. Louis rookie, 20, walks George Altman, the only batter he faces.
- April 15 – In the 13th and last home opener of the Milwaukee Braves, they defeat the Cubs, 5–1, behind Bob Sadowski's complete game before 33,874 at County Stadium. Milwaukee hero Eddie Mathews doubles off ex-Brave pitching star Lew Burdette, now a Cub, in the fifth inning. A fan boycott, driven by bitterness over the Braves' imminent move to Atlanta, will limit their season attendance to 555,584.
- April 17 – ABC Television debuts its Saturday-afternoon "Game of the Week" broadcast, the first to beam regular-season games into all U.S. markets, MLB and minor-league. The one-year, $5.7 million national package—shared by 18 of the 20 teams when the Philadelphia Phillies and CBS-owned New York Yankees opt out—features play-by-play announcers Merle Harmon, Keith Jackson and Chris Schenkel, analysts Leo Durocher, Pee Wee Reese and Jackie Robinson, and pregame host Howard Cosell.
- April 19 – Hard-throwing Jim Maloney of the Cincinnati Reds shuts out the host Milwaukee Braves, 2–0, for the first of 19 one-hitters thrown in MLB in 1965. Denis Menke's eighth-inning single is Milwaukee's lone safety. Maloney will also throw 1965's first no-hitter on August 19.
- April 24
  - Pitcher Don Larsen, now 35, returns to the Baltimore Orioles in a trade from the Houston Astros in exchange for infielder Bob Saverine and cash. In 1954, two years before Larsen's famous perfect game during the 1956 World Series, he had posted an abysmal 3–21 record as a member of the first edition of the modern Orioles franchise.
  - The New York Mets score three runs in the top of the ninth inning en route to defeating the San Francisco Giants, to give Casey Stengel his 1,900th career win—including 37 victories in the World Series—as a big-league manager.

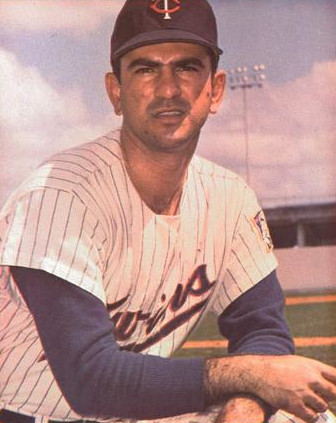
Camilo Pascual

- April 27 – Minnesota Twins pitcher Camilo Pascual, in addition to winning the game against the Cleveland Indians, helps his own cause by stroking a first-inning grand slam home run, the second of his career. He joins 1940s Detroit Tiger right-hander Dizzy Trout as the only American League pitchers to have hit a pair of slams. Next season, on July 3, 1966, National Leaguer Tony Cloninger will slug two "grannies" in the same game.
- April 28 – Lindsey Nelson, lead broadcaster for the New York Mets, calls his team's game today against Astros from a gondola suspended above second base in the Astrodome.

=== May ===
- May 1
  - Yogi Berra, the New York Yankees' Hall-of-Famer now a 39-year-old catcher-coach for the New York Mets, plays in his first MLB game since Game 3 of the 1963 World Series, grounding out as a pinch hitter at Crosley Field, Cincinnati. Three days later, he will start behind the plate at Shea Stadium, go two for three (both singles), and guide pitcher Al Jackson to a 2–1 complete game victory over the Philadelphia Phillies. But those two hits will be his only safeties in a Mets' uniform. After two more appearances, including one final game started May 9, Berra will be released May 17. He remains a coach with the Mets until becoming their fourth-ever full-time manager on April 7, 1972.
  - Tommy Davis, two-time National League batting champion and the Los Angeles Dodgers' All-Star, 26-year-old left fielder, breaks his ankle sliding into second base at Dodger Stadium. He will miss five months of action before making a pinch-hitting appearance October 1, and will not appear in the 1965 World Series.
- May 3 – The New York Yankees send utilityman and pinch-hitter Johnny Blanchard and pitcher Rollie Sheldon to the Kansas City Athletics for catcher Doc Edwards.
- May 4 – The San Francisco Giants acquire veteran left-handed reliever Bill Henry, a two-time former National League All-Star, from the Cincinnati Reds for righty Jim Duffalo.
- May 12 – The Houston Astros activate coach Nellie Fox, future Baseball Hall of Fame second baseman. Fox, 37, will appear in 21 games for Houston through July 25, mostly as a pinch hitter, and collect the last 11 safeties of his 2,663-hit career, before returning full-time to the coaching ranks.
- May 14 – It takes one extra inning, but Carl Yastrzemski hits for the cycle and goes five-for-five with a base on balls in the Boston Red Sox' ten-inning, 12–8 defeat at the hands of the Detroit Tigers at Fenway Park. Yastrzemski's is the only "cycle" in MLB in 1965.
- May 16 – With the Kansas City Athletics off to a miserable, 5–21 start, owner Charles O. Finley replaces manager Mel McGaha with former catcher Haywood Sullivan, who had been piloting Triple-A Vancouver. At 34, Sullivan becomes the youngest skipper in the majors for 1965.
- May 20 – Warren Spahn, the winningest southpaw of all time—now a pitcher-coach for the New York Mets—faces his old team, the Milwaukee Braves, for the first time after winning 356 games in a Brave uniform. But his return to Milwaukee County Stadium is spoiled by a 7–1 defeat in which he lasts only five innings on the mound. Eddie Mathews, Spahn's fellow Hall-of-Fame teammate for 13 years and still the Braves' third baseman, seals Spahn's fate with a grand slam homer during Milwaukee's seven-run fifth inning. With the Atlanta-bound Braves playing out their final season in Wisconsin, only 17,433 fans attend Spahn's homecoming game.
- May 22 – The San Francisco Giants and Pittsburgh Pirates trade shortstops, with José Pagán going to Pittsburgh for Ducky Schofield.
- May 23 – The Braves send veteran outfielder Lee Maye — also an accomplished rhythm & blues recording artist — to the Houston Astros for starting pitcher Ken Johnson and outfielder Jim Beauchamp.
- May 25 – Jerry Hoffberger, president of the National Brewing Company and a minority partner in the Baltimore Orioles since the franchise moved from St. Louis in 1954, acquires ownership control from investment banker Joseph Iglehart, forced to sell because he is a major shareholder in the Columbia Broadcasting System, new operators of the rival New York Yankees. Hoffberger, 46, will own the Orioles until August 2, 1979, a period during which they win four American League pennants and the 1966 and 1970 World Series.
- May 27 – Dave Morehead of the Boston Red Sox, with help from closer Dick Radatz, defeats future Hall-of-Famer Jim Kaat of the Minnesota Twins at Fenway Park 2–0, tossing a three-hitter (although he walks six). It is the only game — of 18 — that Boston will win from the pennant-bound Twins all season.
- May 29 – The San Francisco Giants and Chicago Cubs make a five-player trade in which the Giants send pitcher Bob Hendley, catcher Ed Bailey and outfielder Harvey Kuenn to Chicago for catcher Dick Bertell and outfielder Len Gabrielson.

=== June ===
- June 4 – The Houston Astros obtain former six-time American League All-Star first baseman Jim Gentile from the Kansas City Athletics for pitcher Jesse Hickman and infielder Ernie Fazio ("PTBNL").
- June 8 – The first Major League Baseball draft is held for high school and collegiate players. The Athletics use the first overall pick to draft Rick Monday from Arizona State University. After Bernie Carbo is selected as their first-round pick, the Cincinnati Reds take catcher Johnny Bench in the second round. In the 12th round, the New York Mets pick up Nolan Ryan.
- June 14 – The 24–32 Chicago Cubs replace "head coach" Bob Kennedy with Lou Klein. Kennedy had held the post since February 1963 and brought continuity to what had been a chaotic "College of Coaches" rotation of field leaders. Klein will serve through the end of the 1965 campaign as the experiment's last head coach.
- June 15
  - Denny McLain of the Detroit Tigers, called on to relieve starting pitcher Dave Wickersham in the first inning against the Boston Red Sox at Tiger Stadium, strikes out the first seven Boston hitters he faces, and registers 14 Ks in 62/3 innings of relief, a Tigers' record. McLain, 21, is removed for a pinch hitter in the Detroit half of the seventh, but the Tigers rally to win, 6–5.
  - The Houston Astros acquire left-handed pitcher Mike Cuellar and right-hander Ron Taylor from the St. Louis Cardinals for southpaw reliever Hal Woodeshick and righty Chuck Taylor. Cuellar, 28, establishes himself as a starter in Houston's rotation; he'll become a star after his December 1968 trade to the Baltimore Orioles.
- June 20 – Jay Dahl, who on September 27, 1963, was the starting pitcher for the Houston Colt .45s when they fielded an all-rookie line-up, dies in a car crash the day after pitching for the Salisbury Astros, a Houston farm club in the Western Carolinas League. At 19 years old, Dahl becomes the youngest former major league player to die.

=== July ===
- July 1 – Hal Smith, former three-time National League All-Star catcher who was forced to retire from the St. Louis Cardinals in June 1961 because of a heart condition, briefly returns to the playing ranks on an emergency basis. Smith, 34, now the Pittsburgh Pirates' bullpen coach, is activated when the Bucs' three top catchers are injured; he appears in four games, logs three plate appearances, and catches 12 innings before returning to the full-time coaching ranks. He suffers no health-related consequences.
- July 3
  - The Minnesota Twins defeat the Kansas City Athletics 3–2. Coupled with a Cleveland Indians loss, the Twins move into a flat-footed tie for first place in the American League, with both teams at 45–28. The Twins gain sole possession on July 5, and are in first by four games by the time they complete a nine-game winning streak on July 10. They do not relinquish their lead for the remainder of the season.
  - National League standings after action concludes on this Saturday of the Fourth of July weekend show the Los Angeles Dodgers (47–33) two games ahead of the Cincinnati Reds (44–34).

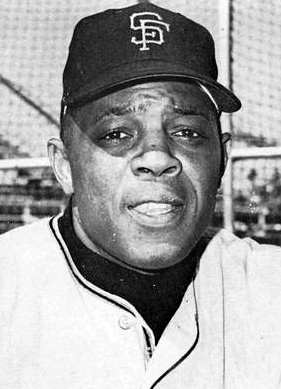
Willie Mays

- July 13 – At Minnesota's Metropolitan Stadium, Willie Mays hits a home run with two walks and two runs to pace the National League to a 6–5 All-Star Game victory over the American League. Juan Marichal pitches three scoreless innings to earn Game MVP.
- July 17 – After going only 4–12 (4.36) in 20 games for the last-place New York Mets, Hall-of-Fame pitcher Warren Spahn draws his unconditional release. Two days later, the 44-year-old is signed as a free agent by the contending San Francisco Giants, where he's more effective but wins only three of seven decisions. He retires from pitching at season's end with 363 career victories, most ever by a left-hander.
- July 18 – Sam Mele, normally mild-mannered skipper of the AL-leading Minnesota Twins (now 55–33), gets into a physical altercation with umpire Bill Valentine over a call at first base and Mele's subsequent ejection, only his fourth in all or parts of five seasons as the Twins' pilot. The two men jostle each other, and still photos appear to show Mele "punching" the umpire—a charge Valentine promptly refutes later that day. Mele is suspended for six games by AL president Joe Cronin and fined $500. His emergency replacement, bullpen coach Hal Naragon, leads the Twins to a 5–1 record in his manager's absence.
- July 24 – Casey Stengel, legendary manager of the New York Mets, breaks his left hip, reportedly while stepping out of a car. Hospitalized, he misses a planned celebration of his 75th birthday at Shea Stadium, undergoes surgery, and is unable to return to the team's helm. Former New York Giants catcher Wes Westrum, the Mets' pitching coach, becomes acting skipper.

=== August ===
- August 3
  - In an attempt to block the franchise's imminent move to Atlanta, Milwaukee County files suit in federal court against the Braves, the team's board of directors, the National League, and the nine other NL clubs, charging a violation of U.S. and Wisconsin antitrust laws and seeking triple damages from the defendants.
  - The normally lead-footed Boston Red Sox leg out four triples in a nine-inning, 10–5 victory over the Kansas City Athletics at Municipal Stadium.
- August 18 – Following a protest by St. Louis Cardinals catcher Tim McCarver, home plate umpire Chris Pelekoudas declares Milwaukee Braves hitter Hank Aaron out and nullifies a home run that the slugger had just hit off Cardinal pitcher Curt Simmons. Aaron is called out because he had stepped out of the batter's box as hit the long ball.
- August 19 – Jim Maloney of the Cincinnati Reds throws the first of his two career no hitters. Hurling against the Chicago Cubs at Wrigley Field, Maloney goes ten innings, walks ten men—none of whom score—and issues an intentional walk. The right-hander also fans a dozen. Leo Cárdenas' home run is the game's only run.
- August 22 – During a tense game between the contending Los Angeles Dodgers and San Francisco Giants at Candlestick Park, San Francisco's starting pitcher, Juan Marichal, batting against Sandy Koufax in the third inning, attacks Dodger catcher John Roseboro with his bat. Both benches clear and a 14-minute brawl ensues before peacemakers restore order. A shaken Koufax then gives up a three-run homer to Willie Mays, and the Giants win 4–3 to retake first place. National League president Warren Giles suspends Marichal for eight games, fines him $1,750, and forbids him to travel with his team to Dodger Stadium for the final series of the season.
- August 26 – Tug McGraw, then a starting pitcher, allows two runs in 72/3 innings and the visiting New York Mets beat the host Dodgers and Koufax, 5–2. It is the first time since their 1962 founding that the Mets defeat the future Hall of Famer; Koufax had been 13–0 against them.
- August 30 – The Mets' Casey Stengel announces his retirement, effectively ending a 55-year professional baseball career as a player, manager or coach. He retires with a career managerial record of 1,899–1,835 over 25 MLB seasons dating to 1934; he won ten American League pennants and seven World Series during his 12 seasons (1949–1960) as manager of the New York Yankees. He is the only person to have played for or managed all four of New York's 20th century major league clubs.

=== September ===
- September 2
  - Ernie Banks hits his 400th career home run helping the Chicago Cubs beat the St. Louis Cardinals 5–3.
  - In anticipation of their move the following season to Anaheim, the Los Angeles Angels change their name to the California Angels.
- September 8 – Against the California Angels at Municipal Stadium, Bert Campaneris of the Kansas City Athletics becomes the first player to play all nine positions in the same game, as part of a special promotion. He begins the game at shortstop and plays, in order for the next eight innings, second base, third base, left field, center field, right field, first base, pitcher (he gives up a run on a hit and two walks) and catcher. With the game tied at 3–3 after nine innings, Rene Lachemann replaces Campaneris, who was injured in a collision at the plate with Ed Kirkpatrick to end the top of the ninth. California scores two runs in the 13th inning and defeats Kansas City 5–3.

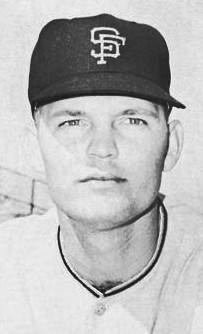
Bob Hendley

- September 9 – At Dodger Stadium, a duel between the Los Angeles Dodgers' Sandy Koufax and Bob Hendley of the Chicago Cubs is perfect until Dodger left fielder Lou Johnson walks in the fifth inning. Following a sacrifice bunt, Johnson steals third base and scores on a throwing error by Cubs catcher Chris Krug. Johnson later has the game's only hit, a 7th-inning double. Koufax's fourth no-hitter in four years is a perfect game, the first in Dodgers history. One hit by two clubs in a completed nine-inning game is also a major league record, as is the one runner left on base. The two base runners in a game is an ML record. For Chicago pitchers, it is the second one-hitter they've thrown against the Dodgers this year and lost. A week later in the rematch in Chicago's Wrigley Field, Hendley beats Koufax and the Dodgers, 2–1. The Cubs won't be no-hit again until July 25, 2015, by Philadelphia Phillie Cole Hamels—a span of 7,920 games.
- September 13 – The San Francisco Giants' Willie Mays' hits his 500th career home run and Juan Marichal earns his 22nd victory of 1965 as the Giants beat the Houston Astros 5–1 at the Astrodome. The win is the Giants' 11th straight and gives them a 2 1/2-game lead in the NL pennant race.
- September 16
  - Before only 1,247 fans at Fenway Park, Dave Morehead of the Boston Red Sox no-hits the Cleveland Indians 2–0. Not until Hideo Nomo in 2001 will another Red Sox pitcher hurl a no-hitter, and the next Fenway Park no-hitter won't come until 2002 (Derek Lowe). The lone Indian baserunner comes on Rocky Colavito's second-inning walk. The home plate umpire is Ed Runge, whose grandson Brian would call balls and strikes for Jonathan Sánchez's 2009 no-hitter.
  - On the same day, Red Sox owner Tom Yawkey fires general manager Pinky Higgins and assigns his former responsibilities to executive vice president Dick O'Connell. The front-office change happens before Morehead's no-hitter, but it's not announced until after the game.
- September 18 – "Mickey Mantle Day" is celebrated at Yankee Stadium on the occasion of Mantle's 2,000th career game (all with the Yankees).
- September 22
  - The Milwaukee Braves play their final game in Milwaukee, losing to the Los Angeles Dodgers 7–6 in 11 innings.
  - Jim Bunning of the Philadelphia Phillies strikes out nine batters in a 11–5 victory over the Chicago Cubs in Game 1 of a doubleheader to break the single-season Phillies' strikeout record (241), set by Grover Cleveland Alexander in 1915. Bunning goes on to post 268 strikeouts.
- September 25
  - Though he has not pitched in the Major Leagues since 1953, the Kansas City Athletics send Satchel Paige to the mound. At (approximately) 59 years old, he is the oldest pitcher in Major League history. In three innings, he strikes out one, and gives up one hit, a single to Carl Yastrzemski. Paige does not earn a decision in the loss to Boston, 5–2.
  - Mudcat Grant, pitching for the Minnesota Twins, wins his 20th game, becoming the first black 20-game winner in the American League. Next month, he'll be the first black AL hurler to win a World Series game, and only the seventh pitcher to homer in one.
- September 26
  - The Minnesota Twins gain their first American League pennant since moving from Washington in 1961 by defeating the expansion Senators team that replaced them, 2–1, at Washington's D.C. Stadium. Minnesota's Jim Kaat (17–11), a member of the last "original" Senators team of 1960, wins the clincher.
  - Don Drysdale holds the St. Louis Cardinals to five hits, and the Los Angeles Dodgers win their ninth in a row to move back into a tie for first place. The streak reaches thirteen.

=== October ===
- October 2
  - Sandy Koufax wins his 26th game as the Dodgers beat the Milwaukee Braves 2–1, for their 14th win in their last 15 games as they clinch the franchise's 15th National League pennant and third since moving to California in 1958.
  - At Shea Stadium, the New York Mets and Philadelphia Phillies play to a 0–0 tie, ended by a curfew, after 18 innings—the majors' longest game, by innings, of the soon-to-end season. Starters Rob Gardner and Chris Short each throw 15 shutout innings before the bullpens take over. Although individual statistics will count, the game must be replayed from scratch on closing day tomorrow.
- October 4 – In the first major trade of the off-season, the Detroit Tigers obtain starting pitcher Bill Monbouquette, 29, a former 20-game winner and four-time American League All-Star, from the Boston Red Sox for catcher Jackie Moore ("PTBNL"), second baseman George Smith and outfielder George Thomas.
- October 7 – Jim Kaat gives Minnesota a 2–0 World Series lead by driving in two runs, defeating Sandy Koufax and the Los Angeles Dodgers 5–1 at Minnesota's Metropolitan Stadium. The game is remembered for Minnesota's Bob Allison making a remarkable sliding catch of a Jim Lefebvre line drive in the wet grass of the outfield.
- October 14 – Working on two days rest, Sandy Koufax strikes out ten and throws a three-hit, 2–0 shutout against the Minnesota Twins in Game 7 of the World Series, giving the Los Angeles Dodgers a second World Championship in three years. Lou Johnson's fourth inning leadoff home run off the left field foul pole gives Koufax the only run he'll need. A Ron Fairly double and Wes Parker single in the same inning add an insurance run to account for the 2–0 final. Koufax, who threw complete game shutouts in games 5 and 7, is named Series MVP.
- October 19
  - NBC Television, which already has the TV rights to the World Series and the Major League Baseball All-Star Game, takes over the Saturday-afternoon and holiday Game of the Week when ABC declines to renew its option. NBC and MLB agree to a three-year $30.6 million contract that will include all 20 teams, and the "Peacock network" will retain the "GotW" for the next 24 years. Its inaugural 1966 season will feature lead announcer Curt Gowdy and analyst Pee Wee Reese on primary games, and Jim Simpson and newly retired New York Yankees shortstop Tony Kubek on "backup" games.
  - The Houston Astros trade catcher Jerry Grote to the New York Mets for a player to be named later and cash. On November 24, the Mets will send pitcher Tom Parsons to the Astros to complete the trade.
- October 20 – The Mets obtain eleven-time All-Star, 5× Gold Glove-winning third baseman, and 1964 NL Most Valuable Player Ken Boyer, 34, from the St. Louis Cardinals for pitcher Al Jackson and third baseman Charley Smith.
- October 25 – After a decade's hiatus, Leo Durocher, 60, resumes his managerial career when he is appointed to lead the 1966 Chicago Cubs. At his press conference with owner Philip K. Wrigley, Durocher emphatically ends the Cubs' "College of Coaches" experiment when he declares, "I'm not a 'head coach.' I'm the manager."
- October 27
  - A week after dealing Ken Boyer, the St. Louis Cardinals trade away two more veteran starting infielders, sending first baseman Bill White and shortstop Dick Groat, along with backup catcher Bob Uecker, to the Philadelphia Phillies for pitcher Art Mahaffey, catcher Pat Corrales and outfielder Alex Johnson. Between them, White (age 31) and Groat (34) have been selected to 16 All-Star teams. White also has won six straight Gold Glove Awards.
  - The Cincinnati Reds hire former Mets' third-base coach Don Heffner, 54, as their manager for 1966. He succeeds Dick Sisler, who was fired October 4.

=== November ===
- November 3 – By a unanimous vote, Sandy Koufax wins his second all-MLB Cy Young Award, the first pitcher to win more than one "Cy" since the award's inauguration in 1956. Koufax posted a 26–8 record and 2.04 ERA and 382 strikeouts, allowing just 5.79 hits per nine innings in 1965. Next year, Koufax' final season on the mound, he'll win his third.
- November 5 – Al López retires after nine seasons as manager of the Chicago White Sox, during which he led them to the 1959 American League championship and averaged 90 wins per season.
- November 10 – San Francisco Giants outfielder Willie Mays, who hit .312 with 52 home runs and 112 RBI, is named 1965 National League MVP. Mays (nine first-place votes, 224 points) edges two Los Angeles Dodgers: Sandy Koufax (six, 177) and Maury Wills (five, 164).
- November 17
  - William Eckert is the 20 MLB owners' unanimous choice to succeed the retiring Ford Frick as Commissioner of Baseball. Eckert, 56, is a former United States Air Force general and holder of an MBA from Harvard. Nevertheless, he is so obscure a choice that he is uncharitably tagged "the unknown soldier" by baseball writers. He will serve three years and three weeks as baseball's fourth "czar" before his firing in December 1968.
  - Lee MacPhail, president and general manager of the Baltimore Orioles since 1959, departs to become the chief assistant to the new Commissioner. One of his final acts with Baltimore is to open serious negotiations with the Cincinnati Reds to acquire superstar outfielder Frank Robinson. MacPhail's successor, Harry Dalton, will put the finishing touches on the blockbuster Robinson trade, which is consummated December 9.

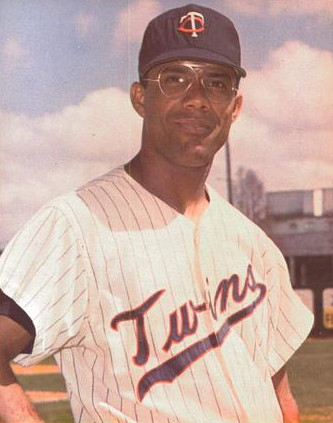
Zoilo Versalles

- November 18 – Minnesota Twins' All-Star shortstop Zoilo Versalles, 25, wins the American League Most Valuable Player Award for 1965. Versalles, a native Cuban who led the Junior Circuit in seven offensive categories and sparked his team to the AL pennant, secures 19 of 20 first-place votes (275 points) to outdistance teammate and fellow Cuban Tony Oliva (one vote, 174 points) to become the first Latin American to be elected MVP by the BBWAA. The following year, 1966, will see Roberto Clemente, an eventual Hall of Famer from Puerto Rico, claim National League MVP honors.
- November 22 – Outfielder Curt Blefary of the Baltimore Orioles edges California Angels pitcher Marcelino López for American League Rookie of the Year honors.
- November 26 – Los Angeles Dodgers second baseman Jim Lefebvre, who hit .250 with 12 home runs and 69 RBI, is voted National League Rookie of the Year over Houston Astros second baseman Joe Morgan (.271, 14, 40) and San Francisco Giants pitcher Frank Linzy (9–3, 43 strikeouts, 1.43 ERA).
- November 28 – Former San Francisco Giants skipper Alvin Dark is named manager of the Kansas City Athletics, replacing Haywood Sullivan, who becomes vice president, player personnel, of the Boston Red Sox. Dark will lead the A's out of the American League basement in 1966, while Sullivan begins an executive career that will culminate in a 15-year stint as the Bosox' co-owner.
- November 29 – The Baltimore Orioles take 30-year-old pitcher Moe Drabowsky in the 1965 Rule 5 draft. The former "bonus baby" turned journeyman—he's only 48–81 (4.19) over his nine-year career so far—will become an effective relief pitcher for next year's Orioles, and his dominant performance in Game 1 of the 1966 World Series will set the tone for Baltimore's shocking sweep of the Los Angeles Dodgers.

=== December ===
- December 1
  - The Pittsburgh Pirates acquire outfielder Matty Alou from the San Francisco Giants for left-hander Joe Gibbon and utilityman Ozzie Virgil Sr. With the tutelage of Pirate manager Harry Walker, an astute batting coach, Alou—previously a .260 lifetime hitter—will win the 1966 National League batting crown (.342), lead the NL in hits (231) and doubles (42) in 1969, and hit .327 in 743 games in a Pirate uniform.
  - The Kansas City Athletics reacquire 19-year-old outfield prospect Joe Rudi when they trade veteran outfielder Jim Landis and minor-league pitcher Jim Rittwage, 21, to the Cleveland Indians for Rudi and rookie catcher Phil Roof. Kansas City had lost Rudi on "first-year waivers" May 3 and he had played 1965 at Class A Dubuque in the Indians' organization. The first-year waivers rule is phased out during this season with the implementation of the MLB amateur draft. Rudi is a future three-time All-Star, Gold Glove Award winner, and World Series champion as a member of the Oakland Athletics.
- December 2
  - The Giants continue to deal during the hot-stove season. They send right-hander Bill Hands and catcher Randy Hundley to the Chicago Cubs for veteran relief pitcher Lindy McDaniel and outfielder Don Landrum. Hands and Hundley will become key players when the Cubs break a two-decade-long streak of futility to become a first-division team and pennant contender starting in 1967.
  - The Baltimore Orioles send veteran first baseman Norm Siebern to the California Angels for young outfielder Dick Simpson. Four days later, they trade left-hander Darold Knowles and outfielder Jackie Brandt to the Philadelphia Phillies for veteran relief pitcher Jack Baldschun. The two deals give Baltimore key pieces for the blockbuster trade they will finalize on December 9.
- December 9 – In a franchise-altering transaction, the Orioles acquire slugging outfielder Frank Robinson, 30, from the Cincinnati Reds for pitchers Baldschun and Milt Pappas and outfielder Simpson. Future Hall-of-Famer Robinson will win the "Triple Crown" and the MVP Award in the American League in 1966, and lead the Orioles to their first-ever World Series title. Moreover, he will help drive them to three more pennants and an additional Fall Classic championship from 1969 through 1971.
- December 12 – The Houston Astros fire general manager Paul Richards and field manager Lum Harris. Richards, the expansion team's chief front-office architect since September 1961, will be replaced by a three-man committee composed of executives Spec Richardson and Tal Smith, as well as Harris' successor as manager, Grady Hatton, who is also named a club vice president.
- December 14 – Eddie Stanky, most recently farm director of the New York Mets, is named to succeed the retired Al López as manager of the Chicago White Sox. "The Brat" hasn't managed in the majors since he was fired as skipper of the St. Louis Cardinals on May 27, 1955.
- December 15
  - The Los Angeles Dodgers deal utility infielder Dick Tracewski to the Detroit Tigers for pitcher Phil Regan. Known as "The Vulture," Regan will go 14–1 (1.62) with a league-best 25 saves coming out of the Dodger bullpen in 1966, helping them repeat as NL champions.
  - The Atlanta Braves trade pitchers Dan Osinski and Bob Sadowski to the Boston Red Sox for pitchers Arnold Earley and Jay Ritchie ("PTBNL") and first baseman Lee Thomas.

== Births ==
=== January ===
- January 2 – Greg Swindell
- January 3
  - Mark Dewey
  - Luis Sojo
- January 4 – Kevin Wickander
- January 5 – Juan Nieves
- January 6 – José DeJesús
- January 10 – Wally Bell
- January 11 – Tony Randazzo
- January 19 – Kevin Coffman
- January 20
  - Brad Brink
  - Kevin Maas
- January 21 – Matt Stark
- January 25 – Brian Holman
- January 26 – Lou Frazier
- January 27 – Rusty Richards
- January 30 – Joel Davis

=== February ===
- February 3 – Rich Scheid
- February 9 – Doug Linton
- February 10 – Lenny Webster
- February 12
  - Rubén Amaro
  - Stan Fansler
  - Dennis Springer
- February 13 – Craig Colbert
- February 16 – Frank DiMichele
- February 17 – Jim Bowie
- February 18 – Masaki Saito
- February 19 – Wayne Rosenthal
- February 20
  - Paul Faries
  - Tony Menéndez
- February 21 – Oscar Azócar
- February 22 – Eric Yelding

=== March ===
- March 2 – Ron Gant
- March 3
  - Bert Heffernan
  - A. J. Sager
- March 7 – Jack Armstrong
- March 9 – Benito Santiago
- March 11 – Steve Reed
- March 12
  - Steve Finley
  - Shawn Gilbert
- March 14 – Kevin Brown
- March 16 – José Mota
- March 17 – John Smiley
- March 18 – Gerónimo Berroa
- March 20 – Chris Hoiles
- March 21 – Tim McIntosh
- March 22 – Glenallen Hill
- March 25 – Jerry Kutzler

=== April ===
- April 5 – Cris Carpenter
- April 9 – Hal Morris
- April 10 – Bruce Egloff
- April 11 – Turner Ward
- April 13 – Jeff DeWillis
- April 17 – Craig Worthington
- April 20 – Masato Yoshii
- April 24 – Mike Blowers
- April 27
  - Bob MacDonald
  - Paul Miller

=== May ===
- May 2 – Félix José
- May 10 – Mike Butcher
- May 12 – Ángel Escobar
- May 13 – José Rijo
- May 14 – Joey Cora
- May 15 – Isidro Márquez
- May 18 – Erik Hanson
- May 20
  - Wayne Housie
  - Todd Stottlemyre
- May 22 – Larry Carter
- May 24
  - Greg Briley
  - Rob Ducey
- May 26 – Ricky Jordan
- May 27
  - Jacob Brumfield
  - Jim Vatcher
- May 29 – Charlie Hayes

=== June ===
- June 1 – Jeff Nelson
- June 4
  - Beau Allred
  - Kurt Stillwell
- June 8 – Kevin Ritz
- June 10 – Jim McNamara
- June 17
  - Manuel Lee
  - Mike Magnante
- June 23 – Mike Walker

=== July ===
- July 2 – Steve Sparks
- July 3 – Greg Vaughn
- July 7 – Sam Holbrook
- July 8
  - Chuck Malone
  - Jerome Walton
- July 10 – Buddy Groom
- July 12
  - Mike Munoz
  - Wally Ritchie
- July 15
  - Scott Livingstone
  - Kirt Manwaring
- July 21 – Mike Bordick
- July 22 – Gary Buckels
- July 24 – Joe Oliver
- July 25 – Torey Lovullo
- July 29 – Luis Alicea
- July 30 – Todd Haney
- July 31 – Ted Barrett

=== August ===
- August 2 – Paul Marak
- August 4
  - Domingo Martínez
  - Matt Merullo
- August 6
  - Atsuya Furuta
  - John Ramos
- August 9 – Dale Polley
- August 10 – Al Osuna
- August 11
  - George Canale
  - Carlos Martínez
  - John Mitchell
- August 12
  - Barry Manuel
  - Joe Millette
- August 13 – Mark Lemke
- August 16 – Xavier Hernandez
- August 17 – Alex Cole
- August 18 – Marcus Lawton
- August 21 – Jim Bullinger
- August 22 – Milt Hill
- August 24 – Webster Garrison
- August 26
  - Carlos Quintana
  - Jeff Richardson

=== September ===
- September 2 – José Meléndez
- September 5
  - Jeff Baldwin
  - Rob Richie
- September 9 – Todd Zeile
- September 10 – Tim Sherrill
- September 11 – Quinn Mack
- September 13 – Steve Curry
- September 14 – Troy Neel
- September 15 – Satoru Komiyama
- September 18 – Jeff Bronkey
- September 21 – D. J. Dozier
- September 22 – Mark Guthrie
- September 24 – Scott Leius
- September 25 – Steve Wapnick
- September 26 – Doug Piatt
- September 27 – Dan Rohrmeier

=== October ===
- October 4 – Steve Olin
- October 6 – Rubén Sierra
- October 7 – Enrique Burgos
- October 8 – Jimmy Kremers
- October 11
  - Orlando Hernández
  - Erik Johnson
- October 16 – Darren Reed
- October 17 – Charlie Montoyo
- October 19
  - Mike Gardiner
  - Dave Haas
  - Wade Taylor
- October 23 – Al Leiter
- October 25 – Steve Decker
- October 26
  - Zach Crouch
  - Gil Heredia
- October 27 – Bobby Moore
- October 28 – Larry Casian

=== November ===
- November 6
  - Brian Givens
  - Ever Magallanes
- November 7 – Kevin Bearse
- November 8 – Jeff Blauser
- November 13 – Bob Natal
- November 16 – Drew Denson
- November 17 – Paul Sorrento
- November 18
  - Scott Hemond
  - Chris Howard
  - Mark Petkovsek
- November 22 – Mike Benjamin
- November 24 – Jeff Plympton
- November 25 – Randy Veres
- November 28 – Matt Williams

=== December ===
- December 1
  - Julio Machado
  - Jeff Tackett
- December 5 – Scott Lewis
- December 8
  - Jeff Grotewold
  - John Orton
- December 9 – Joe Ausanio
- December 11
  - Jay Bell
  - Dave Joppie
  - Adam Peterson
- December 14
  - Craig Biggio
  - Ken Hill
- December 16
  - Randy Hennis
  - Chris Jones
- December 18 – Willie Blair
- December 19 – Chito Martínez
- December 20 – Fernando Ramsey
- December 27 – Tom Marsh
- December 31 – Sil Campusano

== Deaths ==
=== January ===
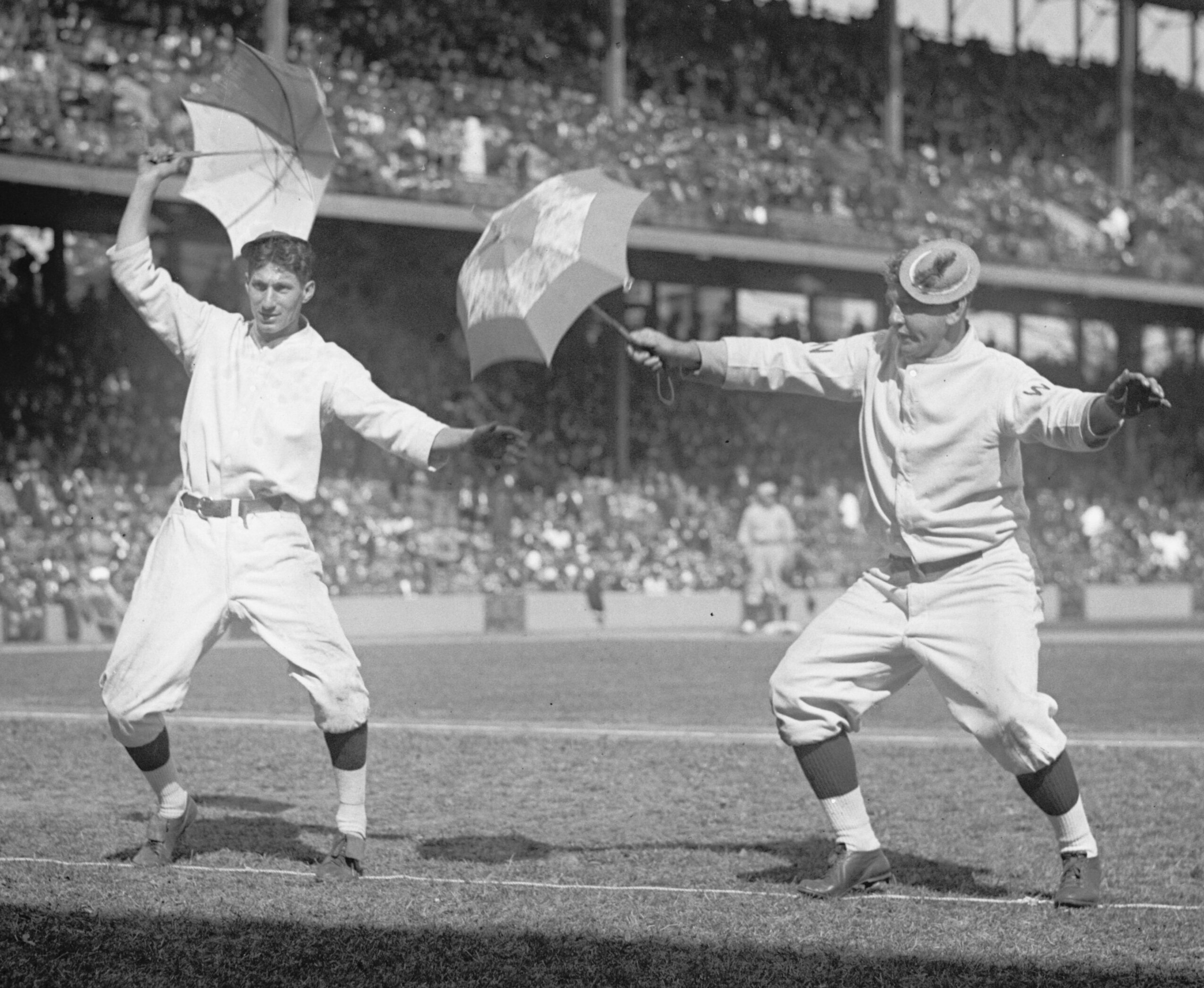
Nick Altrock (right) with Al Schacht

- January 2 – Jim Stephens, 81, catcher who appeared in 428 games for the St. Louis Browns from 1907 to 1912.
- January 5
  - Claude Johnson, 71, second baseman who played in the Negro leagues over seven years spanning 1922 to 1930.
  - Dick Lundy, 66, All-Star shortstop and manager of the Negro leagues.
  - Frank Manush, 81, third baseman in 23 games for the 1908 Philadelphia Athletics; elder brother of the Hall-of-Fame outfielder.
- January 7 – George Smith, 72, pitcher in 229 games for four National League clubs, primarily the Philadelphia Phillies, from 1916 to 1923; led NL in games lost (20) in 1921.
- January 11 – Wally Pipp, 71, first baseman who played in 1,872 games, notably for the New York Yankees (1915–1925) and Cincinnati Reds (1926–1928); home-run champion of the American League in 1916 and 1917, but most known for losing his regular Yankees' first-baseman job to "The Iron Horse", Lou Gehrig, on June 2, 1925; member of 1923 World Series champions.
- January 13 – Brad Kocher, 76, catcher in 67 games for 1912 Detroit Tigers and 1915–1916 New York Giants.
- January 14
  - Bill Hopper, 73, right-hander who pitched in 19 total MLB games for the 1913–1914 St. Louis Cardinals and 1915 Washington Senators.
  - Ellis Johnson, 72, pitcher who got into eight total games over three seasons between 1912 and 1917 for the Chicago White Sox and Philadelphia Athletics.
- January 16 – Jimmy Williams, 88, turn-of-the-century second baseman for Pittsburgh of the National League (1899–1900), then Baltimore (1901–1902), New York (1903–1907) and St. Louis (1908–1909) of the American League, playing in 1,457 games.
- January 17 – Fred Bostick, 69, outfielder for the 1923 Milwaukee Bears of the Negro National League.
- January 19 – Jim Joe Edwards, 70, pitcher for the Indians, White Sox and Reds from 1922 to 1928.
- January 20 – Nick Altrock, 88, left-handed pitcher for Louisville of the National League (1898), then Boston, Chicago and Washington of the American League (1902 to 1909); won 19, 23 and 20 games for 1904–1906 White Sox, and opening match of 1906 World Series, which was captured four games to two by his "Hitless Wonders" over the Cubs in an all-Chicago Fall Classic; in 1912, began a 42-year stint as a Washington coach famous for clowning before games and in the coach's box during contests; known for teaming with a fellow coach, Al Schacht, the "Clown Prince of Baseball".
- January 21 – Bert Whaling, 76, catcher for the 1913–1915 Boston Braves; backup receiver behind Hank Gowdy for 1914 "Miracle Braves" world champions.
- January 24 – Ralph "Pep" Young, 76, second baseman who played 1,022 career games for the 1913 New York Yankees, 1915–1921 Detroit Tigers and 1922 Philadelphia Athletics.
- January 25
  - Charlie Fitzberger, 60, minor-league first basemen who got into seven games as a pinch hitter for the Boston Braves during September 1928.
  - Bill Slater, 62, play-by-play sportscaster for the New York Yankees and New York Giants in 1944–1945 and the Mutual Radio Network's coverage of World Series and MLB All-Star Games during that decade.
- January 26 – Bingo DeMoss, 75, second baseman of the Negro leagues.
- January 28 – Billy Sullivan, 89, one of the best defensive catchers of his era, who played for the Boston Beaneaters (1899–1900), Chicago White Sox (1901–1912, 1914) and Detroit Tigers (1916); led American League catchers in fielding average three times, and a member of the 1906 World Series champion White Sox; managed 1909 ChiSox to a 78–74–7 record.

=== February ===
- February 5 – Bill Brinker, 81, nicknamed "Dodo", pinch hitter, outfielder and first baseman in nine games for the 1912 Philadelphia Phillies; University of Washington alumnus who was Huskies' head baseball coach for seven seasons spanning 1906 to 1919.
- February 7
  - Bruno Betzel, 70, infielder for St. Louis Cardinals in 448 games from 1914 to 1918; later, a longtime manager in minor leagues.
  - Rube Peters, 79, pitcher for 1912 Chicago White Sox and 1914 Brooklyn Tip-Tops (of the "outlaw" Federal League).
- February 8
  - Ray Brown, 56, elected to the National Baseball Hall of Fame in 2006; All-Star pitcher for the Negro leagues' Homestead Grays who led the Negro National League in games won seven times between 1932 and 1945.
  - Ray Kremer, 69, standout hurler for Pittsburgh Pirates (1924–1933); two-time National League ERA champion (1926, 1927); won 20 games twice, 19 games once, 18 games twice, and 17 games once between 1924 and 1930, while posting a 143–85 lifetime won–lost mark; member of 1925 World Series champions, when he went 2–1 with two complete games against the Washington Senators.
- February 11
  - Lefty Herring, 84, first baseman, centerfielder and pitcher who played for both the National League (1899) and American League (1904) versions of the Washington Senators.
  - Pete Noonan, 83, catcher/first baseman who played in 162 career games over three seasons (1904, 1906–1907) for the Philadelphia Athletics, Chicago Cubs and St. Louis Cardinals.
- February 17 – Larry Gilbert, 73, outfielder in 117 games for 1914–1915 Boston Braves, including 1914 world-champion "Miracle Braves"; longtime manager in minor-league Southern Association and a major baseball figure in New Orleans and Nashville; father of two big-leaguers, Charlie and Tookie.
- February 22 – Clarence Huber, 69, third baseman who appeared in 12 games for 1921–1922 Detroit Tigers and 242 contests for 1925–1926 Philadelphia Phillies.
- February 27 – Dan Tye, 65, third baseman for the 1930 Memphis Red Sox of the Negro National League.

=== March ===
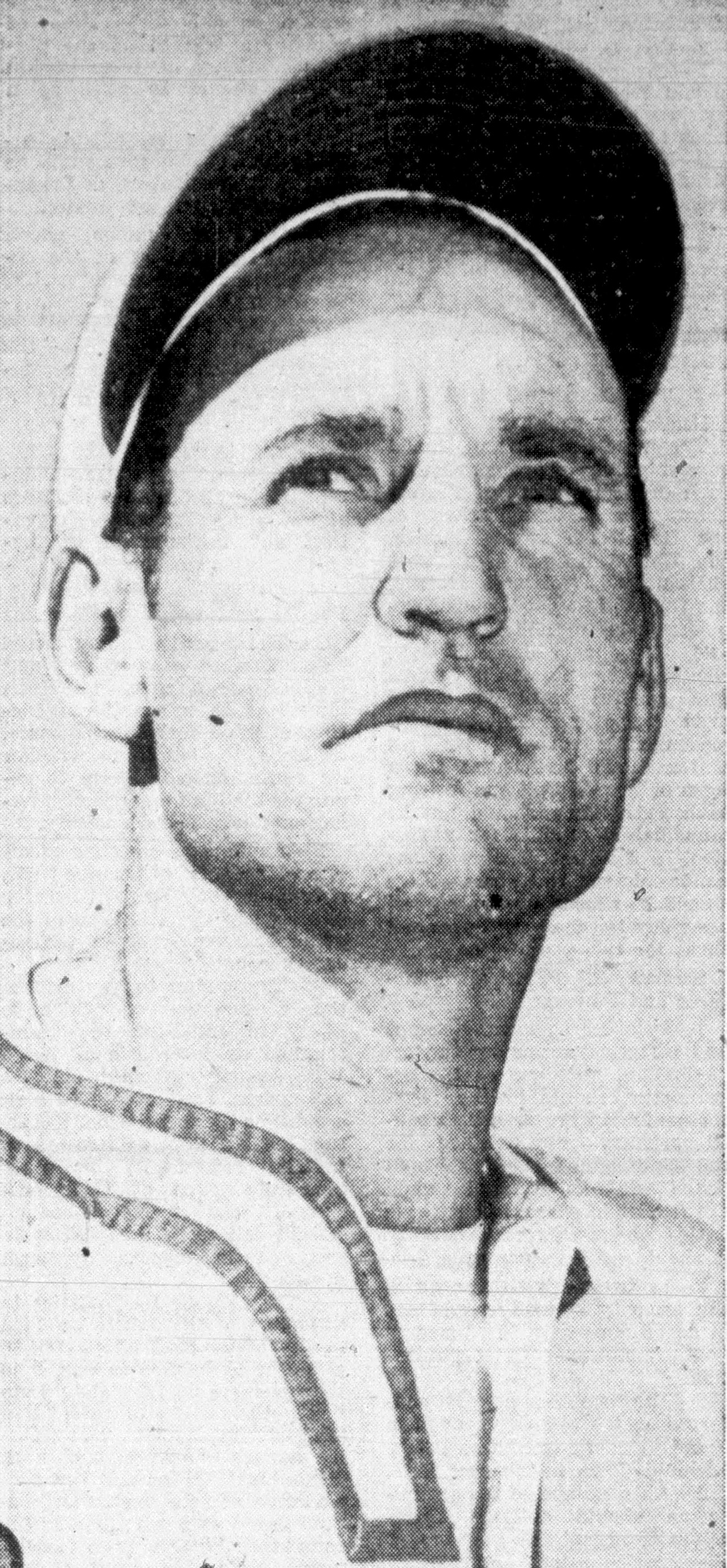
Pepper Martin

- March 1 – Maurice Van Robays, 50, outfielder who hit .267 in 529 career games for Pittsburgh Pirates (1939–1943 and 1946).
- March 2 – Fred Ostendorf, 72, left-hander who hurled for the 1914 Indianapolis Hoosiers of the "outlaw" Federal League.
- March 5
  - Pepper Martin, 61, four-time All-Star third baseman/outfielder and an integral member of the St. Louis Cardinals' legendary Gashouse Gang of the 1930s, who batted .298 over a 13-year career, led the National League with 122 runs scored in 1933, also in stolen bases three times, and was the catalyst in a Cardinals' upset victory over the Philadelphia Athletics in the 1931 World Series.
  - Tadashi Wakabayashi, 57, Hall of Fame Japanese Baseball and NPB pitcher who played for the Osaka/Hanshin Tigers and the Mainichi Orions from 1936 to 1953.
- March 6 – Wally Schang, 75, American League catcher for five teams over 19 seasons (1913–1931) and 1,842 games, including three world champions (1913 Philadelphia Athletics, 1918 Boston Red Sox and 1923 New York Yankees).
- March 9 – Frank Graham, 71, New York sportswriter for over 50 years.
- March 16 – Ed Roetz, 59, infielder who appeared in 16 games for the 1929 St. Louis Browns.
- March 19 – Jack Quinlan, 38, broadcaster; radio voice of the Chicago Cubs from 1957 until his death in a spring-training car accident.

=== April ===
- April 1 – Ernie Walker, 74, outfielder who played in 131 games for 1913–1915 St. Louis Browns; brother of Ewart "Dixie" Walker (died November 14, 1965), and uncle of future National League batting champions Fred "Dixie" Walker and Harry "The Hat" Walker.
- April 5 – Mike Pasquella, 66, first baseman/pinch hitter who played in two National League games in May 1919 — one for Philadelphia and one for St. Louis.
- April 6 – Rudy Kneisch, 65, southpaw who twirled in two contests for the 1926 Detroit Tigers.
- April 9 – Phil Ketter, 80, catcher who played two games for the 1912 St. Louis Browns.
- April 11
  - Sam Fishburn, 71, first baseman and pinch runner who appeared in nine games for the St. Louis Cardinals in 1919.
  - Bobby Vaughn, 79, infielder in five games for 1909 New York Highlanders (American League) and 144 contests for 1915 St. Louis Terriers (Federal League).
- April 16 – Chick Tolson, 66, pinch hitter and backup first baseman who appeared in 144 MLB games—three for Cleveland Indians (1925) and 141 for Chicago Cubs (1926–1927 and 1929–1930).
- April 19
  - Bill Lauterborn, 85, second baseman/third baseman who played 87 games for Boston of the National League in 1904–1905.
  - Woodrow "Lefty" Wilson, 48, southpaw hurler in the Negro leagues who pitched from 1936 to 1940.
- April 21
  - Steve Biras, 48, pinch hitter/second baseman for 1944 Cleveland Indians who played in two MLB games and went two-for-two (1.000) in his pair of big-league at bats.
  - Jock Somerlott, 82, first baseman in 29 total games for 1909–1910 Washington Senators.
- April 29 – Johnny Watson, 57, shortstop in four September 1930 games for the Detroit Tigers.

=== May ===
- May 1
  - Frank Barberich, 83, who pitched for Boston's National League club, the Doves, in 1907 and its American League team, the Red Sox, in 1910.
  - Hi Myers, 76, center fielder who appeared in 1,310 games for Brooklyn (1909, 1911, 1914–1922), St. Louis (1923–1925) and Cincinnati (1925) of the National League; member of Brooklyn's 1916 and 1920 NL champions.
- May 2 – Wally Hood, 70, outfielder who played 67 MLB games between 1920 and 1922, 65 of them for the Brooklyn Robins; his son and namesake briefly pitched for 1949 New York Yankees.
- May 4 – Guy Sturdy, 65, first baseman and minor-league standout who played 59 career games for the 1927–1928 St. Louis Browns.
- May 13
  - Bill Brown, 71, outfielder and pinch hitter for the 1912 Browns.
  - Dick Wantz, 25, rookie Los Angeles Angels pitcher, following surgery for brain cancer, who had made his debut only one month earlier, pitching one inning of relief in his only MLB appearance.
- May 14 – Lee Quillin, 83, third baseman who played 53 games for the 1906–1907 Chicago White Sox.
- May 17 – Bill Bartley, 80, pitcher who appeared three games for the 1903 New York Giants and 16 contests for the 1906–1907 Philadelphia Athletics.
- May 19 – Eric Erickson, 73, pitcher in 145 career games for the New York Giants (1914), Detroit Tigers (1916, 1918–1919) and Washington Senators (1919–1922); one of four natives of Sweden to appear in major leagues.
- May 23 – Earl Webb, 67, outfielder for five clubs over seven seasons between 1925 and 1933, who hit an MLB single season record 67 doubles for the Boston Red Sox in 1931.
- May 25 – Harry Biemiller, 67, pitched in 28 career games for 1920 Washington Senators and 1925 Cincinnati Reds.
- May 29 – Mike McNally, 72, infielder for the Boston Red Sox, New York Yankees and Washington Senators from 1915 to 1925, and later a minor league manager and scout during almost two decades.

=== June ===
- June 8 – Pep Clark, 82, third baseman who played 15 games for 1903 Chicago White Stockings, but spent 17 seasons as a player or player-manager for minor-league Milwaukee Brewers.
- June 15 – Jack Calvo, 71, Cuban-born outfielder who appeared in 34 total games for the 1913 and 1920 Washington Senators.
- June 20 – Jay Dahl, 19, pitcher who started a game for the Houston Colt .45s on September 27, 1963 in which each of their starting nine players were rookies.
- June 21 – Sandy Thompson, 70, outfielder who batted .305 lifetime in 639 games for three Negro leagues clubs (notably the Birmingham Black Barons and Chicago American Giants) from 1923 to 1932.
- June 24 – Johnny Humphries, 50, pitcher who made 211 career appearances for Cleveland Indians (1938–1940), Chicago White Sox (1941–1945) and Philadelphia Phillies (1946); in 1942, set an MLB record by hurling for ten or more innings in four consecutive starting pitcher assignments.

=== July ===
- July 3 – Hank Robinson, 77, left-hander who pitched in 150 games for the Pittsburgh Pirates (1911–1913), St. Louis Cardinals (1914–1915) and New York Yankees (1918).
- July 6 – Jimmy Ring, 70, pitcher who went 118–149 (4.13) over 12 seasons (1917–1928) for the Cincinnati Reds, Philadelphia Phillies, New York Giants and St. Louis Cardinals; member of Reds' 1919 World Series champions; included in high-profile Cardinals-Giants trade involving Rogers Hornsby and Frankie Frisch after 1926 season.
- July 7 – Pat Burke, 64, third baseman who appeared in one MLB contest on September 23, 1924 as a member of the St. Louis Browns.
- July 8 – "Sunny Jim" Blakesley, 68, minor-league outfielder who batted .333 in 1,850 games over 14 seasons (1920–1933); collected over 200 hits five times.
- July 14 – Ike Eichrodt, 62, light-hitting outfielder for 1925–1927 Cleveland Indians and 1931 Chicago White Sox.
- July 15 – Harry Fanwell, 78, pitcher who appeared in 17 games for the 1910 Cleveland Naps.
- July 16 – Otis Starks, 67, left-handed pitcher who appeared for six clubs in the Negro leagues between 1921 and 1935.
- July 21
  - Hugh Bedient, 75, pitcher who starred as a rookie for 1912 world champion Boston Red Sox, winning 20 regular-season games and going 1–0 with a superb ERA of 0.50 over four games and 18 innings pitched in the 1912 World Series; played with Boston through 1914 and with Buffalo Blues of the "outlaw" Federal League in 1915.
  - Ira Townsend, 71, pitcher who worked in eight games for the 1920–1921 Boston Braves.
- July 27 – Harry Lunte, 72, reserve infielder who appeared in 49 games for the 1919–1920 Cleveland Indians, and member of 1920 World Series champions.

=== August ===
- August 7 – Walt Whittaker, 71, pitcher who appeared in one game for the 1916 Philadelphia Athletics, one of the worst teams (36–117–1) in MLB history.
- August 8 – Red Applegate, 42, who pitched in three games for the 1946 Newark Eagles of the Negro National League; also, a heavyweight boxer who fought Rocky Marciano in 1951.
- August 8 – George Crable, 80, left-hander who pitched in two games for the 1910 Brooklyn Superbas.
- August 15 – Stan Pitula, 34, pitcher who appeared in 23 games for the 1957 Cleveland Indians.
- August 19 – Larry Jacobus, 70, who hurled in five games for the 1918 Cincinnati Reds.
- August 21 – Bill Harris, 65, pitcher for the Reds (1923–1924), Pirates (1931–1934) and Red Sox (1938), who also tossed two no-hitters in the International League with the 1936 Buffalo Bisons.
- August 25 – Moonlight Graham, 87, outfielder for the New York Giants in 1905 whose story was popularized in the novel Shoeless Joe and the film Field of Dreams.
- August 29 – Paul Waner, 62, nicknamed "Big Poison"; Hall of Fame right fielder who won three batting titles and the National League's 1927 MVP award with the Pittsburgh Pirates, and became the seventh player to make 3,000 hits; played 15 years (1926–1940) for Pirates, with Bucs posthumously retiring his #11 uniform in 2007; brother of fellow Hall of Fame outfielder Lloyd Waner; also played for Brooklyn Dodgers, Boston Braves and New York Yankees prior to 1945 retirement.
- August 30 – Frank Papish, 47, southpaw who pitched in 149 games for the Chicago White Sox (1945–1948), Cleveland Indians (1949) and Pittsburgh Pirates (1950).

=== September ===
- September 1 – Ivy Olson, 79, shortstop/third baseman for the Cleveland Naps (1911–1914), Cincinnati Reds (1915) and Brooklyn Robins (1915–1924) who appeared in 1,574 games; led National League in hits (1919) and played on two pennant-winners (1916 and 1920) for Brooklyn.
- September 2 – Joe Hoover, 50, shortstop who appeared in 338 games for wartime 1943–1945 Detroit Tigers; member of Detroit's 1945 World Series champions.
- September 3 – Rudy Leopold, 60, Chicago White Sox southpaw who got into two games in July 1929.
- September 21 – Socks Seibold, 69, shortstop who became a pitcher and spent eight years in MLB, marked by stints with the Philadelphia Athletics (1915–1917 and 1919), a decade out of the majors, and five years with Boston Braves (1929–1933).
- September 22 – Biz Mackey, 68, five-time All-Star catcher and manager of the Negro leagues.
- September 23 – Fred Hobgood, 43, left-handed pitcher who played in the Negro leagues between 1941 and 1946.
- September 24 – Cliff Knox, 63, catcher who appeared in six games for 1924 Pittsburgh Pirates.
- September 27 – Tink Riviere, 66, pitcher in 18 games for the 1921 St. Louis Cardinals and three contests for the 1925 White Sox.
- September 30 – Jim Battle, 64, infielder who hit .375 in eight games for the 1927 Chicago White Sox.

=== October ===
- October 3
  - Delos Drake, 78, outfielder/first baseman in 335 career games for 1911 Detroit Tigers and 1914–1915 St. Louis Terriers (Federal League).
  - Jerry McCarthy, 42, first baseman and pinch hitter who appeared in three games for the St. Louis Browns in June 1948; former baseball and football captain at University of Pennsylvania and World War II veteran.
- October 4 – Harvey MacDonald, 67, Philadelphia Phillies pinch hitter and first baseman who appeared in 13 games in June and July 1928.
- October 5 – Wid Matthews, 68, outfielder, scout and executive; played in 192 total games for Philadelphia Athletics (1923) and Washington Senators (1924–1925); general manager of Chicago Cubs (1950–1956) who later worked for Milwaukee Braves and New York Mets as assistant GM.
- October 11 – Willis Cole, 83, Chicago White Sox outfielder who appeared in 68 total games in 1909 and 1910.
- October 12 – Curt Davis, 62, pitcher and two-time All-Star who went 158–131 (3.42) in 429 career games over 13 seasons (1934 to 1946) with four National League clubs; won 22 games for 1939 St. Louis Cardinals and was 15–6 (2.36) for 1942 Brooklyn Dodgers.
- October 14 – Jimmy Boyd, 47, pitcher for 1946 Newark Eagles of the Negro National League.
- October 15 – Fritz Brickell, 30, shortstop and second baseman who played in 41 career games for the New York Yankees (1958–1959) and Los Angeles Angels (1961); son of Fred Brickell.
- October 21 – Harry Kincannon, 56, pitcher who appeared in 59 games for three clubs in the Negro leagues from 1933 to 1939.
- October 22 – Lou Nagelsen, 78, catcher who played two games for the 1912 Cleveland Naps.
- October 23
  - Ed Fitzpatrick, 75, second baseman/outfielder for Boston Braves (1915–1917).
  - Otis Lawry, 71, second baseman/outfielder who played 71 games for Philadelphia Athletics (1916–1917).
  - Ted Odenwald, 63, left-hander who pitched in 11 games for 1921–1922 Cleveland Indians.
  - Chick Shorten, 73, outfielder and lefty-swinging pinch hitter who appeared in 527 games for four clubs, primarily the Detroit Tigers and Boston Red Sox, during eight seasons spanning 1915 to 1924.
- October 24 – John Dudra, 49, infielder for 1941 Boston Braves, who appeared in 14 late-season games.
- October 28 – Walter Barbare, 74, third baseman/middle infielder who played an even 500 games for the Cleveland Naps/Indians, Boston Red Sox, Pittsburgh Pirates and Boston Braves from 1914 to 1916 and 1918–1922.
- October 29
  - Frank Fuller, 72, second baseman for the Detroit Tigers (1915–1916) and Boston Red Sox (1923).
  - Bill McKechnie, 79, nicknamed "Deacon", Hall of Fame manager who became the first pilot to lead three different teams to pennants: the 1925 Pittsburgh Pirates, 1928 St. Louis Cardinals, and 1939–1940 Cincinnati Reds, winning the World Series in 1925 and 1940; his 25-year managerial career produced 1,896 victories and a winning percentage of .524; as a player, he was a switch-hitting infielder who appeared in 846 games for six teams over 11 seasons between 1907 and 1920.
- October 30 – Lee Fohl, 88, manager of three American League clubs over 11 seasons spanning 1915 to 1926, notably the St. Louis Browns (1921 to August 7, 1923); skipper of second-place 1922 Browns, perhaps the most talented edition of the franchise during its 52 years in St. Louis; briefly (five total games) played as a catcher in the National League in 1902 and 1903.

=== November ===
- November 2 – Clarence Fisher, 67, pitcher who worked in four games as a reliever for the 1919–1920 Washington Senators.
- November 4
  - Johnny Mitchell, 71, shortstop who appeared in 329 games for the New York Yankees, Boston Red Sox and Brooklyn Robins between 1921 and 1925.
  - Harry Trekell, 72, pitcher in seven career games for the 1913 St. Louis Cardinals.
- November 14 – Ewart "Dixie" Walker, 77, Washington Senators pitcher who hurled in 74 games from September 1909 to May 1912; father of future NL batting champions Fred "Dixie" Walker and Harry "The Hat" Walker, and brother of Ernie Walker, AL outfielder who died April 1.
- November 16 – Ed Sherling, 68, minor league outfielder who appeared in four major-league games as a pinch hitter and pinch runner for the Philadelphia Athletics in 1924.
- November 23 – Ruby Tyrees, 74, pitcher who appeared in five games for the Cleveland Browns of the Negro National League in 1924.
- November 24 – Ralph Good, 79, pitcher, Maine native and Colby College alumnus who worked in two July 1910 games for Boston of the National League.
- November 27 – Bill Hollahan, 67, third baseman who played in three late-season games for the 1920 Senators.
- November 29 – Stanley Woodward, 70, sports editor of the New York Herald Tribune from 1930 to 1948 and from 1959 to 1962, who oversaw the coverage of Jackie Robinson's integration of Major League Baseball in 1947 and whose column on May 9 thwarted a planned strike by National League players to protest having to take the field with a black man.

=== December ===
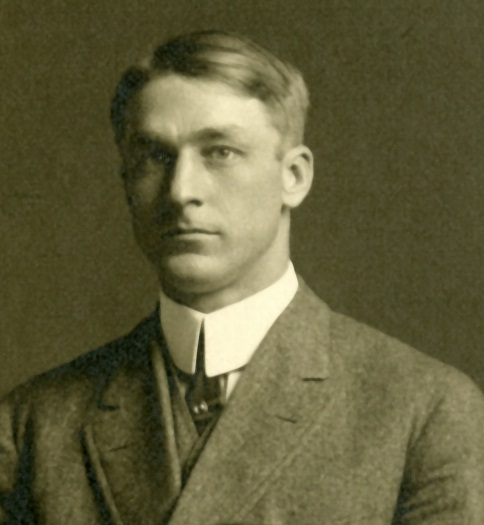
Branch Rickey

- December 5 – Mary Dailey, 37, All-American Girls Professional Baseball League infielder/pitcher.
- December 6 – Frank Crossin, 74, St. Louis Browns catcher who appeared in 55 games over three seasons (1912–1914).
- December 9
  - Branch Rickey, 83, Hall of Fame executive who built dynasties with the St. Louis Cardinals (1917–1942) and Brooklyn Dodgers (1943–1950); known for revolutionizing the game—first by establishing the farm system of player development with the Cardinals, and again by signing Jackie Robinson to integrate the major leagues with the Dodgers; also played significant role in the front offices of the St. Louis Browns and Pittsburgh Pirates, and, late in his career, was president of the nascent Continental League (1959–1960), which never played a game but spurred expansion of MLB from 16 to 20 teams in 1961 and 1962; earlier, a catcher in the American League in 120 games between 1905 and 1914, and manager of both Browns and Cardinals.
  - Dutch Sterrett, 76, pitcher for the New York Yankees from 1912 to 1913.
- December 15
  - Dick Newsome, 56, pitcher in 85 career games for 1941–1943 Boston Red Sox; went 19–10 (4.13) in rookie season with Boston, to place third in American League in victories.
  - Charley Wilson, 70, pitcher in the Negro National League between 1920 and 1926.
- December 19 – John Knight, 80, shortstop who spent 24 years in baseball, including major league stints with the Philadelphia Athletics, Boston Americans, New York Highlanders/Yankees and Washington Senators.
- December 20 – Al Lyons, 47, hard-hitting pitcher/outfielder/pinch hitter who appeared in 60 career games, 39 of them on the mound, over four seasons between 1944 and 1948 for the New York Yankees, Pittsburgh Pirates and Boston Braves; posted a 3–3 (6.30) pitching record and a .293 lifetime batting average (17 for 58).
- December 27 – Bob Smith, 75, native Vermonter who pitched in 17 total games from 1913 to 1915 for Chicago (American League) and Buffalo (Federal League).
- December 29 – Alex Main, 81, right-hander who pitched in 75 games for three teams in three major leagues over three seasons: the 1914 Detroit Tigers (AL), 1915 Kansas City Packers (Federal League) and 1918 Philadelphia Phillies (NL).
