= 1987 Toronto Blue Jays season =

1987 Toronto Blue Jays
- League: American League
- Division: East
- Ballpark: Exhibition Stadium
- City: Toronto
- Record: 96–66 (.593)
- Divisional place: 2nd
- Owners: Labatt Breweries, Imperial Trust, Canadian Imperial Bank of Commerce
- General managers: Pat Gillick
- Managers: Jimy Williams
- Television: CFTO-TV (Don Chevrier, Tony Kubek, Fergie Olver); The Sports Network (Buck Martinez, Fergie Olver)
- Radio: CJCL (AM) (Jerry Howarth, Tom Cheek)

The 1987 Toronto Blue Jays season was the franchise's 11th season of Major League Baseball. It resulted in the Blue Jays finishing second in the American League East with a record of 96 wins and 66 losses. They had been in first place by 3½ games over the Detroit Tigers with a week left to play, but they dropped their next seven games in a row, capped off by a sweep at the hands of Detroit at Tiger Stadium on the last weekend of the season, and lost the division by two games.

== Transactions ==
Transactions by the Toronto Blue Jays during the off-season before the 1987 season.

=== October 1986 ===
October 8	Released Mickey Mahler.
October 20	Released Dennis Lamp.

=== November 1986 ===
November 12	Jim Clancy granted free agency. Cliff Johnson granted free agency. Buck Martinez granted free agency. Ernie Whitt granted free agency.

=== December 1986 ===
December 8	Drafted José Núñez from the Kansas City Royals in the 1986 MLB Rule 5 draft. Stan Clarke drafted by the Seattle Mariners in the 1986 MLB Rule 5 draft. Cliff Young drafted by the Oakland Athletics in the 1986 MLB Rule 5 draft.
December 9	Gibson Alba selected by the Cleveland Indians in the 1986 Minor League Draft.

=== January 1987 ===
January 6	Re-signed free agent Jim Clancy to a two-year, $1.75 million contract.
January 8	Re-signed free agent Ernie Whitt to a three-year, $2.3 million contract.
January 12	Signed free agent Steve Fireovid from the Seattle Mariners to a contract.

=== February 1987 ===
February 2	Acquired Craig McMurtry from the Atlanta Braves for Dámaso García and Luis Leal.

=== March 1987 ===
March 26	Released Ron Shepherd.

=== April 1987 ===
April 2	Released Bill Caudill.
April 4	Signed free agent Odell Jones from the Baltimore Orioles to a contract.
April 6	Cliff Young returned from the Oakland Athletics.

== Regular season ==
- Blue Jays left fielder George Bell drove in 134 runs to lead the American League, along with 47 home runs, and was selected the league's Most Valuable Player in a close vote over the Tigers' Alan Trammell.
- Tom Henke established himself as an elite closer, as he led the American League in saves with 34.
- Starting pitcher Jimmy Key led the American League with a 2.76 ERA.
- July 21, 1987: Jimmy Key threw exactly three pitches and recorded three outs. This was accomplished in the second inning.
- September 14, 1987: The Blue Jays set a Major League record by hitting 10 home runs in a game against the Baltimore Orioles.

=== Season standings ===
AL East
Team	W	L	Pct.	GB	Home	Road
Detroit Tigers	98	64	.605	—	54‍–‍27	44‍–‍37
Toronto Blue Jays	96	66	.593	2	52‍–‍29	44‍–‍37
Milwaukee Brewers	91	71	.562	7	48‍–‍33	43‍–‍38
New York Yankees	89	73	.549	9	51‍–‍30	38‍–‍43
Boston Red Sox	78	84	.481	20	50‍–‍30	28‍–‍54
Baltimore Orioles	67	95	.414	31	31‍–‍51	36‍–‍44
Cleveland Indians	61	101	.377	37	35‍–‍46	26‍–‍55

=== Record vs. opponents ===
1987 American League record Sources:
Team	BAL	BOS	CAL	CWS	CLE	DET	KC	MIL	MIN	NYY	OAK	SEA	TEX	TOR
Baltimore	—	1–12	9–3	8–4	7–6	4–9	9–3	2–11	5–7	3–10	7–5	4–8	7–5	1–12
Boston	12–1	—	4–8	3–9	7–6	2–11	6–6	6–7	7–5	7–6	4–8	7–5	7–5	6–7
California	3–9	8–4	—	8–5	7–5	3–9	5–8	7–5	8–5	3–9	6–7	7–6	5–8	5–7
Chicago	4–8	9–3	5–8	—	7–5	3–9	6–7	6–6	6–7	5–7	9–4	6–7	7–6	4–8
Cleveland	6–7	6–7	5–7	5–7	—	4–9	6–6	4–9	3–9	6–7	4–8	5–7	2–10	5–8
Detroit	9–4	11–2	9–3	9–3	9–4	—	5–7	6–7	8–4	5–8	5–7	7–5	8–4	7–6
Kansas City	3–9	6–6	8–5	7–6	6–6	7–5	—	4–8	8–5	5–7	5–8	9–4	7–6	8–4
Milwaukee	11–2	7–6	5–7	6–6	9–4	7–6	8–4	—	3–9	7–6	6–6	4–8	9–3	9–4
Minnesota	7–5	5–7	5–8	7–6	9–3	4–8	5–8	9–3	—	6–6	10–3	9–4	6–7	3–9
New York	10–3	6–7	9–3	7–5	7–6	8–5	7–5	6–7	6–6	—	5–7	7–5	5–7	6–7
Oakland	5–7	8–4	7–6	4–9	8–4	7–5	8–5	6–6	3–10	7–5	—	5–8	6–7	7–5
Seattle	8–4	5–7	6–7	7–6	7–5	5–7	4–9	8–4	4–9	5–7	8–5	—	9–4	2–10
Texas	5–7	5–7	8–5	6–7	10–2	4–8	6–7	3–9	7–6	7–5	7–6	4–9	—	3–9
Toronto	12–1	7–6	7–5	8–4	8–5	6–7	4–8	4–9	9–3	7–6	5–7	10–2	9–3	—

=== Transactions ===
Transactions for the Toronto Blue Jays during the 1987 regular season.

==== April 1987 ====
April 17	Released Steve Fireovid.

==== June 1987 ====
June 5	Signed free agent Charlie Moore from the Milwaukee Brewers to a one-year, $256,000 contract.

==== July 1987 ====
July 14	Acquired Juan Beníquez from the Kansas City Royals for Luis Aquino.
July 30	Signed amateur free agent Nigel Wilson to a contract.

==== August 1987 ====
August 4	Signed amateur free agent Domingo Cedeño to a contract.
August 9	Acquired Phil Niekro from the Cleveland Indians for Darryl Landrum and a player to be named later (Don Gordon on August 10, 1987).
August 18	Signed amateur free agent Denis Boucher to a contract.
August 25	Released Gary Lavelle.
August 31	Released Phil Niekro. Acquired Mike Flanagan from the Baltimore Orioles for Oswaldo Peraza and a player to be named later (José Mesa on September 4, 1987).

==== September 1987 ====
September 22	Acquired Juan Guzmán from the Los Angeles Dodgers for Mike Sharperson.

=== Roster ===
1987 Toronto Blue Jays roster
Roster
Pitchers: 55 John Cerutti; 18 Jim Clancy; 38 Mark Eichhorn; 46 Mike Flanagan; 38 Don Gordon; 50 Tom Henke; 33 Joe Johnson; 22 Jimmy Key; 46 Gary Lavelle; 13 Jeff Musselman; 35 Phil Niekro; 45 José Núñez; 37 Dave Stieb; 31 Duane Ward; 36 David Wells	Catchers: 27 Jeff DeWillis; 21 Charlie Moore; 52 Greg Myers; 47 Matt Stark; 12 Ernie Whitt; Infielders: 1 Tony Fernández; 23 Cecil Fielder; 17 Kelly Gruber; 16 Garth Iorg; 2 Nelson Liriano; 4 Manuel Lee; 19 Fred McGriff; 5 Rance Mulliniks; 10 Mike Sharperson; 26 Willie Upshaw	Outfielders: 29 Jesse Barfield; 11 George Bell; 7 Juan Beníquez; 40 Rob Ducey; 9 Rick Leach; 15 Lloyd Moseby; 28 Lou Thornton; Other batters: 14 Alexis Infante	Manager: 3 Jimy Williams; Coaches: 43 Cito Gaston (Hitting); 24 John McLaren (Third base); 42 Billy Smith (First base); 8 John Sullivan (Bullpen); 41 Al Widmar (Pitching)

=== Game log ===
1987 Game Log
April: 12–8 (Home: 7–4; Away: 5–4)

#	Date	Opponent	Score	Win	Loss	Save	Attendance	Record
1	April 6	Indians	7–3	Key (1–0)	Candiotti (0–1)		40,404	1–0
2	April 8	Indians	5–1	Clancy (1–0)	Swindell (0–1)		20,388	2–0
3	April 9	Indians	14–3	Niekro (1–0)	Johnson (0–1)	Carlton (1)	21,088	2–1
4	April 10	@ Red Sox	3–0	Hurst (1–0)	Stieb (0–1)		33,679	2–2
5	April 11	@ Red Sox	11–1	Key (2–0)	Clemens (0–1)		33,365	3–2
6	April 12	@ Red Sox	8–3	Stanley (1–1)	Clancy (1–1)		27,521	3–3
7	April 14	White Sox	4–3 (13)	Eichhorn (1–0)	McKeon (0–1)		17,324	4–3
8	April 15	White Sox	5–0	DeLeón (2–0)	Stieb (0–2)		17,285	4–4
9	April 16	Red Sox	4–2	Key (3–0)	Clemens (0–2)	Henke (1)	22,065	5–4
10	April 17	Red Sox	10–5	Cerutti (1–0)	Stanley (1–2)	Eichhorn (1)	36,400	6–4
11	April 18	Red Sox	6–4	Sellers (1–0)	Clancy (1–2)	Schiraldi (2)	39,107	6–5
12	April 19	Red Sox	4–1	Nipper (2–0)	Johnson (0–2)	Gardner (2)	28,140	6–6
13	April 20	@ Indians	8–7 (10)	Musselman (1–0)	Jones (0–1)		11,164	7–6
14	April 21	@ Indians	5–0	Candiotti (1–3)	Key (3–1)		7,203	7–7
15	April 22	@ Indians	6–3	Eichhorn (2–0)	Carlton (1–2)	Henke (2)	6,000	8–7
16	April 24	@ White Sox	4–2 (10)	Eichhorn (3–0)	James (0–1)	Henke (3)	10,105	9–7
17	April 25	@ White Sox	5–4	James (1–1)	Eichhorn (3–1)		18,644	9–8
18	April 26	@ White Sox	5–2	Key (4–1)	DeLeón (2–2)	Henke (4)	20,443	10–8
19	April 28	Twins	5–1	Clancy (2–2)	Viola (1–3)		21,182	11–8
20	April 29	Twins	8–1	Johnson (1–2)	Smithson (3–1)		19,020	12–8

May: 16–11 (Home: 7–3; Away: 9–8)

#	Date	Opponent	Score	Win	Loss	Save	Attendance	Record
21	May 1	Rangers	3–2 (10)	Musselman (2–0)	Williams (2–2)		22,154	13–8
22	May 2	Rangers	9–8	Eichhorn (4–1)	Harris (1–3)		28,352	14–8
23	May 3	Rangers	3–1	Clancy (3–2)	Correa (1–2)	Henke (5)	32,325	15–8
--	May 4	@ Royals	Postponed (rain) Rescheduled for July 3					
24	May 5	@ Royals	6–4	Leibrandt (4–1)	Johnson (1–3)	Gleaton (1)	19,245	15–9
25	May 6	@ Royals	6–3	Black (1–0)	Key (4–2)	Gleaton (2)	28,083	15–10
26	May 8	@ Rangers	7–4	Clancy (4–2)	Guzmán (1–2)	Eichhorn (2)	21,832	16–10
27	May 9	@ Rangers	15–4	Stieb (1–2)	Correa (1–3)		28,847	17–10
28	May 10	@ Rangers	9–8	Witt (1–1)	Eichhorn (4–2)	Mohorcic (3)	17,356	17–11
29	May 11	Royals	4–0	Key (5–2)	Leibrandt (4–2)		24,154	18–11
30	May 12	Royals	3–1	Black (2–0)	Cerutti (1–1)	Quisenberry (3)	30,034	18–12
31	May 13	@ Twins	7–0	Clancy (5–2)	Portugal (1–2)		9,158	19–12
32	May 14	@ Twins	16–4	Stieb (2–2)	Straker (2–1)		10,053	20–12
33	May 15	@ Athletics	3–2	Johnson (2–3)	Plunk (1–2)	Henke (6)	13,139	21–12
34	May 16	@ Athletics	10–3	Haas (1–0)	Key (5–3)		20,900	21–13
35	May 17	@ Athletics	3–0	Stewart (5–3)	Cerutti (1–2)		30,511	21–14
36	May 18	@ Angels	12–0	Clancy (6–2)	Cook (1–2)		23,710	22–14
37	May 19	@ Angels	2–1	Buice (2–2)	Musselman (2–1)	Moore (5)	23,622	22–15
38	May 20	@ Angels	5–4 (10)	Lucas (1–1)	Henke (0–1)		23,766	22–16
39	May 22	@ Mariners	7–5	Eichhorn (5–2)	Bankhead (5–3)	Henke (7)	10,012	23–16
40	May 23	@ Mariners	6–2	Clancy (7–2)	Moore (2–5)		13,489	21–12
41	May 24	@ Mariners	5–2	Langston (5–4)	Stieb (2–3)		12,751	24–17
42	May 25	@ Mariners	6–5	Key (6–3)	Morgan (4–5)	Musselman (1)	8,499	25–17
43	May 27	Athletics	4–1	Haas (2–1)	Johnson (2–4)	Ontiveros (1)	25,245	25–18
44	May 28	Athletics	4–3	Stewart (6–4)	Clancy (7–3)	Leiper (1)	27,017	25–19
45	May 29	Angels	3–1	Stieb (3–3)	Sutton (2–5)	Henke (8)	33,107	26–19
46	May 30	Angels	4–3 (10)	Eichhorn (6–2)	Lazorko (0–2)		36,055	27–19
47	May 31	Angels	7–2	Cerutti (2–2)	Candelaria (4–2)		40,313	28–19

June: 17–11 (Home: 8–7; Away: 9–4)

#	Date	Opponent	Score	Win	Loss	Save	Attendance	Record
48	June 1	Mariners	2–0	Bankhead (6–3)	Johnson (2–5)	Wilkinson (2)	28,294	28–20
49	June 2	Mariners	4–3	Musselman (3–1)	Moore (2–7)	Henke (9)	31,076	29–20
50	June 3	Mariners	7–2	Stieb (4–3)	Langston (6–5)	Eichhorn (3)	30,502	30–20
51	June 5	Orioles	6–2	Key (7–3)	Bell (5–3)		32,514	31–20
52	June 6	Orioles	8–5 (11)	Musselman (4–1)	Dixon (3–5)		36,345	32–20
53	June 7	Orioles	3–2	Eichhorn (7–2)	Boddicker (5–2)		42,254	33–20
54	June 8	@ Yankees	11–0	Stieb (5–3)	Rhoden (6–4)		25,526	34–20
55	June 9	@ Yankees	7–2	Cerutti (3–2)	Guidry (0–2)		29,765	35–20
56	June 10	@ Yankees	4–1	Key (8–3)	John (6–2)	Henke (10)	26,806	36–20
57	June 11	@ Orioles	8–6	Johnson (3–5)	Habyan (1–2)	Henke (11)	17,409	37–20
58	June 12	@ Orioles	8–5	Eichhorn (8–2)	Boddicker (5–3)	Musselman (2)	27,521	38–20
59	June 13	@ Orioles	8–2	Cerutti (4–2)	McGregor (2–6)		25,359	39–20
60	June 14	@ Orioles	8–5	Schmidt (7–1)	Eichhorn (8–3)	DeLeón (1)	31,358	39–21
61	June 15	Tigers	2–1	Terrell (5–6)	Key (8–4)	King (4)	36,225	39–22
62	June 16	Tigers	10–4	Lavelle (1–0)	Robinson (4–3)		36,398	40–22
63	June 17	Tigers	3–2	Tanana (6–3)	Clancy (7–4)	Hernández (2)	46,227	40–23
64	June 18	Brewers	6–3	Nieves (5–4)	Stieb (5–4)	Plesac (15)	31,353	40–24
65	June 19	Brewers	15–6	Musselman (5–1)	Clear (5–2)		31,230	41–24
66	June 20	Brewers	3–2	Wegman (6–6)	Key (8–5)	Plesac (16)	38,465	41–25
67	June 21	Brewers	7–6	Musselman (6–1)	Crim (3–5)	Henke (12)	44,444	42–25
68	June 22	@ Tigers	2–0	Tanana (7–3)	Clancy (7–5)		28,978	42–26
69	June 23	@ Tigers	8–7	Stieb (6–4)	Robinson (4–4)	Henke (13)	29,275	43–26
70	June 24	@ Tigers	5–3	Cerutti (5–2)	Morris (10–3)	Musselman (3)	34,866	44–26
71	June 26	@ Brewers	10–5	Plesac (4–0)	Henke (0–2)		29,461	44–27
72	June 27	@ Brewers	8–1	Clancy (8–5)	Nieves (5–5)		48,159	45–27
73	June 28	@ Brewers	11–5	Higuera (6–7)	Stieb (6–5)		42,389	45–28
74	June 29	Yankees	15–14	Righetti (5–3)	Henke (0–3)		42,179	45–29
75	June 30	Yankees	4–0	Guidry (1–3)	Wells (0–1)		45,297	45–30

July: 15–12 (Home: 12–4; Away: 3–8)

#	Date	Opponent	Score	Win	Loss	Save	Attendance	Record
76	July 1	Yankees	6–1 (12)	Clements (2–0)	Musselman (6–2)		47,828	45–31
77	July 3	@ Royals	6–4	Gubicza (7–8)	Clancy (8–6)	Gleaton (4)		45–32
78	July 3	@ Royals	5–4	Farr (3–2)	Henke (0–4)		40,619	45–33
79	July 4	@ Royals	9–1	Black (4–2)	Wells (0–2)	Stoddard (1)	40,746	45–34
80	July 5	@ Royals	4–3 (10)	Quisenberry (4–0)	Eichhorn (8–4)		25,607	45–35
81	July 6	Rangers	6–4	Key (9–5)	Hough (9–4)	Henke (14)	28,264	46–35
82	July 7	Rangers	6–2	Clancy (9–6)	Loynd (1–5)	Henke (15)	28,013	47–35
83	July 8	Rangers	5–2	Musselman (7–2)	Witt (4–4)	Henke (16)	30,341	48–35
84	July 9	Royals	7–1	Núñez (1–0)	Black (4–3)		31,290	49–35
85	July 10	Royals	7–0	Stieb (7–5)	Leibrandt (8–7)		35,200	50–35
86	July 11	Royals	2–1	Saberhagen (15–3)	Key (9–6)		38,289	50–36
87	July 12	Royals	3–2	Clancy (10–6)	Black (4–4)	Henke (17)	40,268	51–36
88	July 16	@ Twins	5–2	Key (10–6)	Blyleven (8–7)	Henke (18)	34,334	52–36
89	July 17	@ Twins	3–2	Viola (9–6)	Eichhorn (8–5)	Reardon (18)	28,234	52–37
90	July 18	@ Twins	7–5	Stieb (8–5)	Niekro (5–7)		38,365	53–37
91	July 19	@ Twins	7–6	Schatzeder (1–0)	Lavelle (1–1)	Reardon (19)	32,095	53–38
92	July 20	@ Rangers	5–3	Cerutti (6–2)	Hough (10–6)	Henke (19)	27,501	54–38
93	July 21	@ Rangers	6–4	Mohorcic (6–2)	Musselman (7–3)		13,791	54–39
94	July 22	@ Rangers	5–3	Russell (3–1)	Lavelle (1–2)	Mohorcic (13)	16,380	54–40
95	July 23	Twins	4–3	Stieb (9–5)	Frazier (5–5)		35,320	55–40
96	July 24	Twins	8–6	Eichhorn (9–5)	Reardon (5–5)	Henke (20)	30,382	56–40
97	July 25	Twins	13–9	Schatzeder (2–0)	Musselman (7–4)		36,395	56–41
98	July 26	Twins	4–2	Key (11–6)	Blyleven (9–8)	Henke (21)	33,353	57–41
99	July 27	Red Sox	10–8	Musselman (8–4)	Schiraldi (5–5)	Henke (22)	35,425	58–41
100	July 28	Red Sox	5–4	Musselman (9–4)	Sambito (1–3)	Henke (23)	36,122	59–41
101	July 29	Red Sox	6–5	Schiraldi (6–5)	Lavelle (1–3)		35,052	59–42
102	July 31	Indians	8–3	Key (12–6)	Ritter (0–1)		30,256	60–42

August: 17–12 (Home: 12–6; Away: 5–6)

#	Date	Opponent	Score	Win	Loss	Save	Attendance	Record
103	August 1	Indians	3–0	Bailes (4–4)	Clancy (10–7)	Stewart (2)	38,435	60–43
104	August 2	Indians	11–5	Stieb (10–5)	Akerfelds (0–2)	Lavelle (1)	33,351	61–43
105	August 3	@ White Sox	14–5	Musselman (10–4)	Bannister (6–9)		12,193	62–43
106	August 4	@ White Sox	4–1	Cerutti (7–2)	Allen (0–6)	Henke (24)	13,319	63–43
107	August 5	@ White Sox	3–2	Key (13–6)	Dotson (8–8)	Henke (25)	13,360	64–43
108	August 6	@ Indians	14–5	Bailes (5–4)	Clancy (10–8)		7,978	64–44
109	August 7	@ Indians	15–1	Stieb (11–5)	Akerfelds (0–3)		24,049	65–44
110	August 8	@ Indians	3–1	Candiotti (5–11)	Núñez (1–1)		16,706	65–45
111	August 9	@ Indians	5–1	Cerutti (8–2)	Schrom (5–8)		13,890	66–45
112	August 10	@ Red Sox	9–1	Clemens (12–7)	Clancy (10–9)		30,606	66–46
113	August 11	@ Red Sox	8–3	Key (14–6)	Stanley (3–12)		32,555	67–46
114	August 12	@ Red Sox	10–4	Stieb (12–5)	Sellers (4–5)		33,403	68–46
115	August 13	White Sox	10–3	Bannister (8–9)	Niekro (7–12)		45,152	68–47
116	August 14	White Sox	3–2	Cerutti (9–2)	DeLeón (5–11)	Henke (26)	37,236	69–47
117	August 15	White Sox	1–0	Dotson (10–8)	Clancy (10–10)		37,155	69–48
118	August 16	White Sox	6–4	Eichhorn (10–5)	Searage (2–3)	Henke (27)	41,384	70–48
119	August 18	@ Athletics	2–1	Stieb (13–5)	Eckersley (6–6)	Henke (28)	34,823	71–48
120	August 19	@ Athletics	7–3	Stewart (17–8)	Cerutti (9–3)		16,039	71–49
121	August 20	@ Athletics	7–6	Lavelle (2–3)	Cadaret (2–1)	Henke (29)	12,607	72–49
122	August 21	@ Angels	3–1	Reuss (4–1)	Niekro (7–13)	Minton (10)	47,925	72–50
123	August 22	@ Angels	2–0	Núñez (2–1)	Witt (15–9)	Henke (30)	34,209	73–50
124	August 23	@ Angels	5–2	McCaskill (4–5)	Stieb (13–6)	Buice (14)	42,000	73–51
125	August 24	@ Mariners	7–3	Cerutti (10–3)	Morgan (10–14)		11,869	74–51
126	August 25	@ Mariners	6–3	Clancy (11–10)	Moore (6–16)	Eichhorn (4)	12,367	75–51
127	August 27	Athletics	9–4	Key (15–6)	Cadaret (3–2)		38,026	76–51
128	August 28	Athletics	3–2	Stewart (18–9)	Stieb (13–7)	Eckersley (10)	32,256	76–52
129	August 29	Athletics	6–5 (10)	Plunk (2–4)	Eichhorn (10–6)	Eckersley (11)	42,388	76–53
130	August 30	Athletics	13–3	Clancy (12–10)	Rijo (2–7)		38,211	77–53
131	August 31	Angels	8–7 (11)	Fraser (9–8)	Henke (0–5)	Lucas (3)	30,224	77–54

September: 19–9 (Home: 13–5; Away: 6–4)

#	Date	Opponent	Score	Win	Loss	Save	Attendance	Record
132	September 1	Angels	4–3 (10)	Musselman (11–4)	Witt (15–10)		31,101	78–54
133	September 2	Angels	7–6	Wells (1–2)	Buice (5–6)		33,408	79–54
134	September 4	Mariners	6–5 (10)	Núñez (3–1)	Powell (0–3)		33,042	80–54
135	September 5	Mariners	3–0	Flanagan (4–6)	Campbell (0–3)	Henke (31)	38,436	81–54
136	September 6	Mariners	3–2 (11)	Núñez (4–1)	Núñez (3–3)		44,287	82–54
137	September 7	@ Brewers	5–3	Ward (1–0)	Plesac (5–6)	Henke (32)	16,935	83–54
138	September 8	@ Brewers	6–4	Bosio (10–5)	Stieb (13–8)	Crim (9)	8,053	83–55
139	September 9	@ Brewers	6–4	Clear (7–5)	Wells (1–3)		10,555	83–56
140	September 11	Yankees	6–5 (10)	Wells (2–3)	Righetti (7–4)		38,540	84–56
141	September 12	Yankees	13–1	Key (16–6)	Rhoden (16–10)		45,648	85–56
142	September 13	Yankees	8–5	Hudson (10–6)	Cerutti (10–4)	Righetti (27)	45,312	85–57
143	September 14	Orioles	18–3	Clancy (13–10)	Dixon (7–10)		27,446	86–57
144	September 15	Orioles	6–2	Flanagan (5–6)	Mesa (0–1)		27,192	87–57
145	September 16	Orioles	7–0	Key (17–6)	Boddicker (10–9)		29,353	88–57
146	September 17	@ Yankees	6–5	Righetti (8–4)	Henke (0–6)		27,032	88–58
147	September 18	@ Yankees	6–3	Clancy (14–10)	Allen (0–8)	Wells (1)	34,110	89–58
148	September 19	@ Yankees	4–2	Gullickson (3–2)	Flanagan (5–7)	Righetti (29)	38,239	89–59
149	September 20	@ Yankees	6–2	Wells (3–3)	Leiter (1–1)		45,267	90–59
150	September 21	@ Orioles	2–1	Cerutti (11–4)	Boddicker (10–10)	Henke (33)	13,683	91–59
151	September 22	@ Orioles	8–4	Wells (4–3)	Ballard (2–7)		13,923	92–59
152	September 23	@ Orioles	6–1	Clancy (15–10)	Habyan (5–6)		22,590	93–59
153	September 24	Tigers	4–3	Flanagan (6–7)	Morris (18–10)	Henke (34)	42,436	94–59
154	September 25	Tigers	3–2	Musselman (12–4)	Hernández (3–4)		46,233	95–59
155	September 26	Tigers	10–9	Núñez (5–1)	Henneman (9–3)		46,429	96–59
156	September 27	Tigers	3–2 (13)	Henneman (10–3)	Núñez (5–2)	Noles (2)	46,346	96–60
157	September 28	Brewers	6–4	Wegman (11–11)	Flanagan (6–8)	Clear (6)	34,113	96–61
158	September 29	Brewers	5–3	Bosio (11–7)	Key (17–7)		34,314	96–62
159	September 30	Brewers	5–2	Nieves (14–8)	Stieb (13–9)		35,245	96–63

October: 0–3 (Home: 0–0; Away: 0–3)

#	Date	Opponent	Score	Win	Loss	Save	Attendance	Record
160	October 2	@ Tigers	4–3	Alexander (9–0)	Clancy (15–11)	Henneman (7)	45,167	96–64
161	October 3	@ Tigers	3–2 (12)	Henneman (11–3)	Musselman (12–5)		45,026	96–65
162	October 4	@ Tigers	1–0	Tanana (15–10)	Key (17–8)		51,005	96–66

== Player stats ==
= Indicates team leader

= Indicates league leader

=== Batting ===
==== Starters by position ====
Note: Pos = Position; G = Games played; AB = At bats; H = Hits; Avg. = Batting average; HR = Home runs; RBI = Runs batted in

Pos	Player	G	AB	H	Avg.	HR	RBI
C	Ernie Whitt	135	446	120	.269	19	75
1B	Willie Upshaw	150	512	125	.244	15	58
2B	Garth Iorg	122	310	65	.210	4	30
3B	Kelly Gruber	138	341	80	.235	12	36
SS	Tony Fernández	146	578	186	.322	5	67
LF	George Bell	156	610	188	.308	47	134
CF	Lloyd Moseby	155	592	167	.282	26	96
RF	Jesse Barfield	159	590	155	.263	28	84
DH	Fred McGriff	107	295	73	.247	20	43

==== Other batters ====
Note: G = Games played; AB = At bats; H = Hits; Avg. = Batting average; HR = Home runs; RBI = Runs batted in

Player	G	AB	H	Avg.	HR	RBI
Rance Mulliniks	124	332	103	.310	11	44
Rick Leach	98	195	55	.282	3	25
Cecil Fielder	82	175	47	.269	14	32
Nelson Liriano	37	158	38	.241	2	10
Manuel Lee	56	121	31	.256	1	11
Charlie Moore	51	107	23	.215	1	27
Mike Sharperson	32	96	20	.208	0	9
Juan Beníquez	39	81	23	.284	5	21
Rob Ducey	34	48	9	.188	1	6
Jeff DeWillis	13	25	3	.120	1	2
Matt Stark	5	12	1	.083	0	0
Greg Myers	7	9	1	.111	0	0
Lou Thornton	12	2	1	.500	0	0
Alexis Infante	1	0	0	----	0	0

=== Pitching ===
==== Starting pitchers ====
Note: G = Games pitched; IP = Innings pitched; W = Wins; L = Losses; ERA = Earned run average; SO = Strikeouts

Player	G	IP	W	L	ERA	SO
Jimmy Key	36	261.0	17	8	2.76	161
Jim Clancy	37	241.1	15	11	3.54	180
Dave Stieb	33	185.0	13	9	4.09	115
Joe Johnson	14	66.2	3	5	5.13	27
Mike Flanagan	7	49.1	3	2	2.37	43
Phil Niekro	3	12.0	0	2	8.25	7

==== Other pitchers ====
Note: G = Games pitched; IP = Innings pitched; W = Wins; L = Losses; ERA = Earned run average; SO = Strikeouts

Player	G	IP	W	L	ERA	SO
John Cerutti	44	151.1	11	4	4.40	92
José Núñez	37	97.0	5	2	5.01	99

==== Relief pitchers ====
Note: G = Games pitched; W = Wins; L = Losses; SV = Saves; ERA = Earned run average; SO = Strikeouts

Player	G	W	L	SV	ERA	SO
Tom Henke	72	0	6	34	2.49	128
Mark Eichhorn	89	10	6	4	3.17	96
Jeff Musselman	68	12	5	3	4.15	54
Gary Lavelle	23	2	3	1	5.53	17
David Wells	18	4	3	1	3.99	32
Duane Ward	12	1	0	0	6.94	10
Don Gordon	5	0	0	0	4.09	3

== Award winners ==
- Jesse Barfield, Gold Glove Award
- George Bell, American League RBI Champion, 134
- George Bell, American League MVP
- George Bell, Silver Slugger Award
- George Bell, The Sporting News Player of the Year Award
- Jim Clancy, Pitcher of the Month Award, May
- Tony Fernández, Gold Glove Award
- Tom Henke, American League Leader, Saves, 34
- Jimmy Key, American League ERA Champion, 2.76 ERA

All-Star Game

- George Bell, OF, starter
- Tony Fernández, shortstop, reserve
- Tom Henke, pitcher, reserve

== Farm system ==
Level	Team	League	Manager
AAA	Syracuse Chiefs	International League	Doug Ault
AA	Knoxville Blue Jays	Southern League	Glenn Ezell
A	Dunedin Blue Jays	Florida State League	Bob Bailor
A	Myrtle Beach Blue Jays	South Atlantic League	Barry Foote
A-Short Season	St. Catharines Blue Jays	New York–Penn League	Joe Lonnett
Rookie	Medicine Hat Blue Jays	Pioneer League	Eddie Dennis

LEAGUE CHAMPIONS: Myrtle Beach
