= Blakesley (surname) =

Blakesley is a surname and may refer:

- Jacob S. D. Blakesley, American translator
- Jim Blakesley (1896–1965), American minor league baseball player
- Joseph Blakesley (1808–1885), English Anglican clergyman and author
- Nora David, Baroness David (née Blakesley) (1913–2009), English Labour Party politician
- Rosalind Polly Blakesley, British author and art historian
