= Sam Fishburn =

Sam Fishburn may refer to:

- Sam Fishburn (baseball) (1893–1965), American baseball player
- Sam Fishburn (footballer) (born 2003), English footballer
