= Cliff Young (baseball) =

American baseball player (1964–1993)

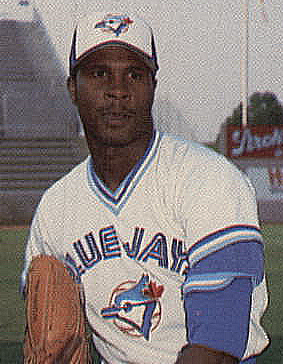
- Young with the Knoxville Blue Jays c. 1986
- Pitcher
- Born: August 2, 1964; Willis, Texas, U.S.
- Died: November 4, 1993 (aged 29); Montgomery County, Texas, U.S.
- Batted: Left Threw: Left

MLB debut
- July 14, 1990, for the California Angels

Last MLB appearance
- July 24, 1993, for the Cleveland Indians

MLB statistics
- Win–loss record: 5–4
- Earned run average: 4.25
- Strikeouts: 56
- Stats at Baseball Reference

Teams
- California Angels (1990–1991); Cleveland Indians (1993)

Clifford Raphael Young (August 2, 1964 – November 4, 1993) was an American professional baseball pitcher. He pitched in parts of three seasons in Major League Baseball (MLB) between 1990 and 1993 for the California Angels (1990–91) and Cleveland Indians (1993).

He was originally drafted by the Montreal Expos in 1983, then was acquired by the Toronto Blue Jays on September 10, 1985, completing an earlier trade of outfielder Mitch Webster to Montreal.

He was selected by the Oakland Athletics in the Rule 5 draft after the 1986 season, then was later returned to Toronto before the 1987 season started. Toronto traded him to the California Angels on March 9, 1989 for pitcher DeWayne Buice.

The Cleveland Indians then signed him to a minor league contract on November 3, 1992, and invited him to spring training.

On May 21, 1993, Young picked up the only save of his abbreviated career in a 10-5 Indians win over the Tigers. Young went 3 2/3 shutout innings, closing out the win for starter Mike Bielecki. He became a free agent at the end of the season.[2]

Shortly thereafter, Young was killed in a highway crash when the truck he was driving went off the road, hitting a tree, killing him instantly.

== See also ==
- List of baseball players who died during their careers
