= Alexis Infante =

Venezuelan baseball player (born 1961)

- Middle infielder / Third baseman
- Born: December 4, 1961 (age 64); Barquisimeto, Venezuela
- Batted: Right Threw: Right

MLB debut
- September 27, 1987, for the Toronto Blue Jays

Last MLB appearance
- July 15, 1990, for the Atlanta Braves

MLB statistics
- Batting average: .109
- Home runs: 0
- Runs batted in: 0
- Stats at Baseball Reference

Teams
- Toronto Blue Jays (1987–1989); Atlanta Braves (1990)

Fermín Alexis Infante Carpio (born December 4, 1961) is a Venezuelan former professional baseball utility infielder. Listed at 5' 10", 175 lb., he batted and threw right handed.

== Career ==
Born in Barquisimeto, Lara, Infante played for the Toronto Blue Jays and Atlanta Braves in a span of four seasons from 1987 to 1990.

In the 1980s, the Blue Jays called Infante its best defensive shortstop in the American League next to Chicago's Ozzie Guillén. Infante had exceptional range and enough arm to make a throw from the hole, but he was unable to help himself with the bat.

In a four-season career, Infante was mostly used as a late-inning defense replacement as well as a pinch runner. He posted a .109 batting average with 11 runs scored and one stolen base without home runs or RBI in 60 game appearances.

Besides, Infante spent ten seasons in the Toronto and Atlanta minor league systems between 1982 and 1996, compiling a .255 average with 12 homers and 249 RBI in 880 games.

In between, he played and managed for the Olmecas de Tabasco in the Mexican League, and played winter ball for the Cardenales de Lara club of the Venezuelan League.

After his playing days, Infante managed the Dominican Summer League Rangers and also has coached for a long time in his native country for the Cardenales.

== See also ==
- List of players from Venezuela in Major League Baseball
