= Jeff Musselman =

American baseball player (born 1963)

- Pitcher
- Born: June 21, 1963 (age 63); Doylestown, Pennsylvania, U.S.
- Batted: Left Threw: Left

MLB debut
- September 2, 1986, for the Toronto Blue Jays

Last MLB appearance
- September 7, 1990, for the New York Mets

MLB statistics
- Win–loss record: 23–15
- Earned run average: 4.31
- Strikeouts: 125
- Stats at Baseball Reference

Teams
- Toronto Blue Jays (1986–1989); New York Mets (1989–1990)

Jeffrey Joseph Musselman (born June 21, 1963) is an American former Major League Baseball pitcher. He played for the Toronto Blue Jays and the New York Mets from 1986 to 1990.

== Career ==
Musselman graduated from Central Regional High School in Bayville, New Jersey, and Harvard University. In 1984, he played collegiate summer baseball in the Cape Cod Baseball League for the Yarmouth-Dennis Red Sox.

He was drafted in the sixth round of the 1985 Major League Baseball draft by the Blue Jays. His best season in the majors was 1987, when he appeared in 68 games for Toronto, posting a 12–5 record with a 4.15 ERA at 54 strikeouts in 89 innings of work.

On July 31, 1989, he was traded by the Toronto Blue Jays with minor leaguer Mike Brady to the New York Mets for Mookie Wilson. He appeared in 20 games for the Mets in 1989, posting a 3–2 record with a 3.08 ERA.

== Personal ==
After retiring as a player, Musselman remained in baseball as a vice-president in the offices of sports agent Scott Boras. Musselman has three daughters. His middle daughter is Maddie Musselman, a 3 time Olympian (Paris, 2024) and 2 time Gold medalist in water polo at the Summer Olympics in Rio (2016) and Tokyo (2021).
