= Ruby Tyrees =

American baseball player (1891–1965)

- Pitcher
- Born: July 22, 1891; Liberty, Missouri, U.S.
- Died: November 23, 1965 (aged 74); Wadsworth, Kansas, U.S.
- Batted: Right Threw: Right

Negro league baseball debut
- 1916, for the Chicago American Giants

Last appearance
- 1924, for the Cleveland Browns

Teams
- Chicago American Giants (1916); Royal Poinciana Hotel (1916); Cleveland Browns (1924)

Ruby Pearl Tyrees (July 22, 1891 – November 23, 1965) was an American professional baseball pitcher in the Negro leagues. He played with the Chicago American Giants and Royal Poinciana Hotel in 1916 and with the Cleveland Browns in 1924.
