= Fred Bostick =

American baseball player

- Left fielder
- Born: November 19, 1895; St. Louis, Missouri, U.S.
- Died: January 17, 1965 (aged 69); St. Louis, Missouri, U.S.
- Batted: Right Threw: Right

Negro league baseball debut
- 1923, for the Milwaukee Bears

Last appearance
- 1924, for the St. Louis Giants
- Stats at Baseball Reference

Teams
- Milwaukee Bears (1923); St. Louis Giants (1924)

Fred Bostick (November 19, 1895 – January 17, 1965) was an American professional baseball left fielder in the Negro leagues. He played with the Milwaukee Bears in 1923 and the St. Louis Giants in 1924.
