= Jeff DeWillis =

American baseball player (born 1965)

- Catcher
- Born: April 13, 1965 (age 61); Houston, Texas
- Batted: Right Threw: Right

MLB debut
- April 19, 1987, for the Toronto Blue Jays

Last MLB appearance
- June 3, 1987, for the Toronto Blue Jays

MLB statistics
- Batting average: .120
- Home runs: 1
- Runs batted in: 2
- Stats at Baseball Reference

Teams
- Toronto Blue Jays (1987)

Jeffrey Allen DeWillis (born April 13, 1965) is an American former professional baseball catcher. He played for the Toronto Blue Jays of Major League Baseball (MLB) in 1987 and played Minor League Baseball from 1983 to 1987.

== Early life and amateur career ==
DeWillis was born on April 13, 1965, in Houston, Texas. He attended Pearland High School where he played baseball, football and basketball. He was named an honorable mention on the 1980 and 1981 24-5A all-district basketball teams. For baseball, DeWillis, a catcher, was named to the all-state team in 1981 and 1982 was named first team all-district in 1983.

== Toronto Blue Jays organization ==
In May 1983, DeWillis committed to play baseball at Baylor University. However, he was drafted by the Toronto Blue Jays in the third round of the 1983 Major League Baseball draft and signed with Toronto. He reported to the Medicine Hat Blue Jays of the Pioneer League. He appeared in 56 games for Medicine Hat in 1983, finishing the year with five home runs, 21 runs batted in and a .242 batting average.

He was promoted to the Class A Kinston Blue Jays of the Carolina League in 1984, appearing in 122 games, before playing in one game with the Knoxville Blue Jays of the Southern League before the season ended. In January 1985, he was invited to spring training with the Blue Jays as a non-roster invitee. In March, he received attention from scouts and members of Toronto front office for his play in spring training, with Blue Jays vice president Bobby Mattick comparing DeWillis to Rick Dempsey. He was ultimately sent back to the minor leagues, and split the 1985 season between Kinston, Knoxville, and the Triple-A Syracuse Chiefs.

In November 1985, he was added to the Blue Jays roster. However, he was sent on loan to the Double-A Memphis Chicks, an affiliate of the Kansas City Royals, following spring training on April 2, 1986, in an effort to get him more playing time. He returned to Knoxville by June.

== Major leagues ==
DeWillis began the 1987 season with Knoxville, but was promoted to the Blue Jays on April 18 after catcher Matt Stark was placed on the disabled list. He made his major league debut on April 19 as a defensive replacement against the Boston Red Sox. He started the following game against the Cleveland Indians, recording his fist career hit. He hit his first home run on April 25 against the Chicago White Sox. He was sent back down to Knoxville on June 6 after Toronto signed catcher Charlie Moore. DeWillis played in 39 games for Knoxville, hitting .131. He was recalled by Toronto as a September call-up on August 30. However, he did not appear in a game the remainder of the year. He ended the season with 13 games played, a .120 batting average, one home run and two RBI. He was sent down to Syracuse after the season ended on October 21.

== Attempted conversion to pitcher and college football ==
In spring training 1988, DeWillis attempted to transition from catching to pitching. However, he was released by the Blue Jays in mid-April.

In August 1989, DeWillis enrolled at Texas Tech University and tried out at quarterback for the school's football team as a walk-on. However, he quit the team by August 26.
