= Frank DiMichele =

American baseball player (born 1965)

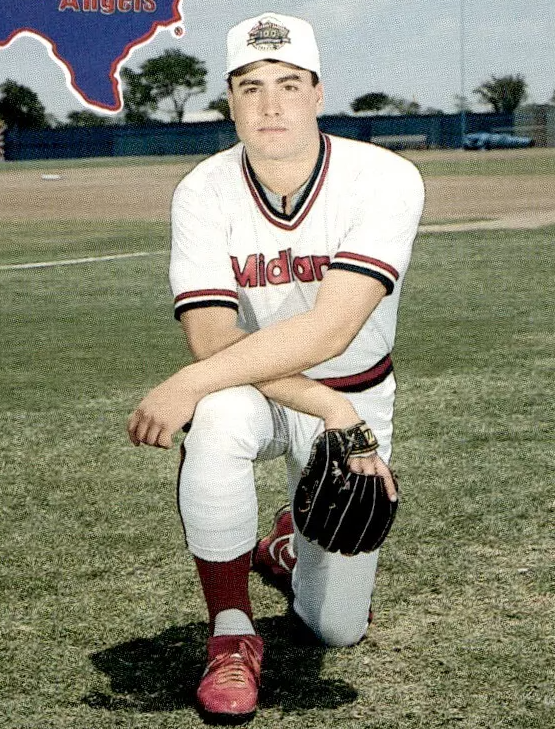
- DiMichele with the Midland Angels c. 1988
- Relief pitcher
- Born: February 16, 1965 (age 60); Philadelphia, Pennsylvania, U.S.
- Batted: Right Threw: Left

MLB debut
- April 8, 1988, for the California Angels

Last MLB appearance
- April 17, 1988, for the California Angels

MLB statistics
- Innings pitched: 4.2
- Earned run average: 9.64
- Strikeouts: 1
- Stats at Baseball Reference

Teams
- California Angels (1988)

Frank Lawrence DiMichele (born February 16, 1965) is an American former professional baseball player who played one season for the California Angels of Major League Baseball (MLB). He served as the head baseball coach at La Salle University from 1996 to 1997.
