= Dan Tye =

American baseball player

- Third baseman
- Born: November 9, 1899; Barbourville, Kentucky, U.S.
- Died: February 27, 1965 (aged 65); Cincinnati, Ohio, U.S.
- Threw: Right

Negro league baseball debut
- 1930, for the Memphis Red Sox

Last appearance
- 1930, for the Memphis Red Sox

Teams
- Memphis Red Sox (1930)

Daniel Richard Tye (November 9, 1899 – February 27, 1965) was an American Negro league third baseman in the 1930s.

A native of Barbourville, Kentucky, Tye played for the Memphis Red Sox in 1930. He died in Cincinnati, Ohio in 1965 at age 65.
