= John Ramos =

American baseball player (born 1965)

- Catcher / Designated hitter
- Born: August 6, 1965 (age 61); Tampa, Florida, U.S.
- Batted: Right Threw: Right

MLB debut
- September 18, 1991, for the New York Yankees

Last MLB appearance
- October 5, 1991, for the New York Yankees

MLB statistics
- Batting average: .308
- Home runs: 0
- Runs batted in: 3
- Stats at Baseball Reference

Teams
- New York Yankees (1991)
Medals
Men's baseball
Representing United States
World Junior Baseball Championship
Silver medal – second place	1983 Johnstown	Team

John Joseph Ramos (born August 6, 1965) is an American former Major League Baseball catcher. He played in 10 career games in 1991 with the New York Yankees, and had 8 hits in 26 at bats.

Ramos attended college at Stanford University. In 1985 he played collegiate summer baseball with the Cotuit Kettleers of the Cape Cod Baseball League and was named a league all-star. He was selected by the Yankees in the 5th round of the 1985 MLB draft.
