= Jacob S. D. Blakesley =

American translator

Jacob Still Deutsch Blakesley is an American translator of fiction and poetry who teaches at the University of Leeds, where he co-directs the Leeds Centre for Dante Studies. He won a 2018 NEA Literature Translation Fellowship for a project on translating the modern experimental Italian poet Edoardo Sanguineti.

His poetry translations from Italian and other languages have been published in Chicago Review, Comparative Critical Studies, Poetry Miscellany, and Stand. He is currently the chair of the John Dryden Translation Competition.

His translation of modern Italian fiction, Great Italian Short Stories of the Twentieth-Century, was published by Dover in 2013.

His own critical work includes two monographs, Modern Italian Poets: Translators of the Impossible and A Sociological Approach to Poetry Translation: modern European poet-translators. He has also edited a volume entitled Sociologies of Poetry Translation: Emerging Perspectives, along with co-editing two special journal issues on poetry translation and the English author Tony Harrison.
