= Jim Blakesley =

American minor league baseball player (1896–1965)

- Born: October 16, 1896; Mulhall, Oklahoma, United States
- Died: July 8, 1965 (aged 68); Altadena, California

James Tilton Blakesley (October 16, 1896 – July 8, 1965) was a longtime minor league baseball player who hit over 200 career home runs. He never reached the major leagues, but spent two seasons in the high-quality Pacific Coast League. He was nicknamed Sunny Jim.

He was born in Mulhall, Oklahoma.

The 5', 10", 190 pound outfielder began his career in 1920, hitting .306 with 36 doubles and 10 triples in 132 games between the Henryetta Hens and Wichita Jobbers. With Wichita the next year, he hit .350 with 25 home runs and 46 doubles and set the Western League record with five doubles in a game on May 27. In 1922, with the same team, he hit .342 with 14 home runs, 60 doubles, and 222 hits. 1923 was his final campaign with Wichita; he hit .359 with 36 homers, 53 doubles, 16 triples, and 246 hits in 169 games, to lead the league in triples and total bases (439). He played for the PCL's Vernon Tigers in 1924 and 1925, hitting .315 with 11 home runs, 51 doubles, 14 triples, and 218 hits the initial season and .286 with 13 home runs and 13 triples the latter. He also had a baseball card in the Zeenut series that year. He spent most of 1926 with the Omaha Buffaloes of the Western League, hitting .379 with 39 home runs, 49 doubles, 11 triples, and 217 hits (leading the WL in slugging with a .728 mark). He hit .305 with 12 triples for the New Orleans Pelicans in 1927 and followed that with a .382 batting average, 19 home runs, 50 doubles, and 13 triples in 152 games for the New Haven Profs in 1928. Back with New Orleans in 1929 and 1930, Blakesley hit .336 with 14 triples the former year and .332 with 16 triples the latter; in 1931, he played for three teams though his stats for that season are incomplete. In 1932, he hit .317 in 58 games with the Richmond Colts and in 1933, he hit .330 in 46 games for the Durham Bulls to wrap up his career. Overall, he batted .333 with 2,338 hits, 487 doubles, 148 triples, and 201 home runs in 1,849 career games. He also had 3,724 total bases.

Blakesley also played a couple of seasons in the California Winter League.

He died in Altadena, California.
