= DeWayne Buice =

American baseball player (born 1957)

- Pitcher
- Born: August 20, 1957 (age 68); Lynwood, California, U.S.
- Batted: Right Threw: Right

MLB debut
- April 25, 1987, for the California Angels

Last MLB appearance
- June 27, 1989, for the Toronto Blue Jays

MLB statistics
- Win–loss record: 9–11
- Earned run average: 4.23
- Strikeouts: 157
- Stats at Baseball Reference

Teams
- California Angels (1987–1988); Toronto Blue Jays (1989)

DeWayne Allison Buice (born August 20, 1957) is an American former professional relief pitcher. Buice played two seasons for the California Angels and half a season for the Toronto Blue Jays of Major League Baseball (MLB). He officially announced his retirement and played in his final game on June 27, 1989, but continued to make appearances in the minor leagues into the 2000s, exclusively for teams in which he had an ownership stake.

Buice is one of six pitchers in the Angels' 60-year history to strike out at least 100 batters in a season without starting a game (109 in 1987). The others are Mark Clear (105, 1980), Bryan Harvey (101, 1991), Troy Percival (100, 1996), Scot Shields (109, 2004) and Francisco Rodríguez (123, 2004).

Buice finished with a career record of 9 wins versus 11 losses, 20 saves, 157 strikeouts and a 4.23 earned run average over a 2½-year MLB career. Buice is currently the Reno Astros' co-owner.

== Upper Deck ==
Buice was one of the original managing partners of the Upper Deck trading cards company, and held that position from 1988 to 2000. Buice was in downtown Yorba Linda, California, one evening in November 1987, looking for a particular Chinese restaurant in the area, and after looking around the neighborhood without success, he went into a baseball card shop called "The Upper Deck" to ask the person working there whether he knew the whereabouts of the restaurant.

Buice and owner Bill Hemrick struck up a friendship, which led to Buice having an autograph signing at the store, and within weeks, Buice had become one of Hemrick's business partners.

Hemrick and then-partner Paul Sumner were starting a card company called Upper Deck. The two did not have the connections to help land them the necessary license from the Major League Baseball Players Association (MLBPA), which would allow them to use the names and likenesses of the players on the card. The only response they could elicit was that the players union wasn't accepting another card company for three more years. Buice was told that if he could help them secure a license, he was promised a 12 percent stake in the card company. Buice would become a key figure in getting MLBPA officials to agree to a meeting. By the end of the 1988 season, Hemrick and Summer received the license and were making baseball cards in 1989.

The company they started was called Upper Deck. The glossy cards featured holograms to protect against counterfeiting. There would be a high demand for the cards. Tom Geideman, one of Upper Deck's first employees, who was responsible for picking the players who would be featured in the set, called the phenomenon cardboard gold. By the time Buice retired from professional ball at the end of the 1989 season, he had collected $2.8 million. Buice believed he was owed much more, so he sued Upper Deck executives. After a battle over his stake in the company was settled in court, he reportedly made $17 million on the deal.

Buice entered into a four-year contract with the company. After the strike in 1994/95 was resolved, Upper Deck gave Buice six more years of ownership in the form of a contract extension. DeWayne Buice never worked for Upper Deck. Buice made the contact between Hemrick and the then de facto commissioner of baseball, Bud Selig, which earned Buice a twelve percent stake in the company. Buice earned $27 million, far more than his short MLB career brought him.
