= Matt Stark =

American baseball player (born 1965)

- Catcher
- Born: January 21, 1965 (age 61); Whittier, California, U.S.
- Batted: Right Threw: Right

MLB debut
- April 8, 1987, for the Toronto Blue Jays

Last MLB appearance
- September 29, 1990, for the Chicago White Sox

MLB statistics
- Batting average: .179
- Home runs: 0
- Runs batted in: 3
- Stats at Baseball Reference

Teams
- Toronto Blue Jays (1987); Chicago White Sox (1990)

Matthew Scott Stark (born January 21, 1965) is an American former Major League Baseball catcher and designated hitter who played for two seasons. Stark had an 18 year career that included time in Mexico and Taiwan.

Stark played five games for the Toronto Blue Jays during the 1987 season and eight games for the Chicago White Sox during the 1990 season. He also won a World Series in 2003 with the Florida Marlins as a coach.

Stark is now working in MLB baseball as an analyst.
