= Sam Fishburn (baseball) =

American baseball player (1893–1965)

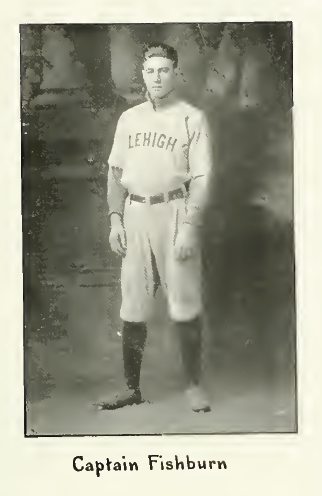
- First baseman / Second baseman
- Born: May 15, 1893
- Died: April 11, 1965 (aged 71)
- Batted: Right Threw: Right

MLB debut
- May 30, 1919, for the St. Louis Cardinals

Last MLB appearance
- July 9, 1919, for the St. Louis Cardinals
- Stats at Baseball Reference

Samuel E. Fishburn (May 15, 1893 – April 11, 1965) was an American Major League Baseball player from Haverhill, Massachusetts, who appeared in 9 games for the 1919 St. Louis Cardinals, with two hits in six at bats. An alumnus of Lehigh University, Fishburn died in Bethlehem, Pennsylvania. He was Jewish.
