= Willie, Mickey and the Duke Award =

Major League Baseball Award

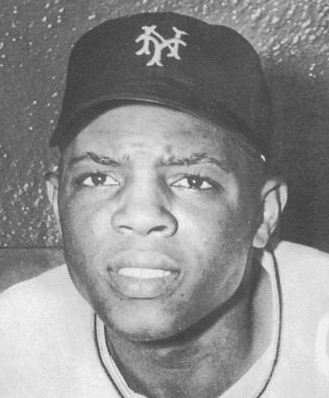
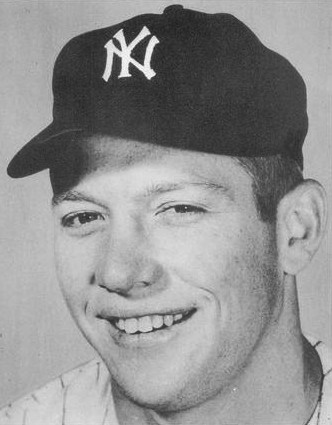
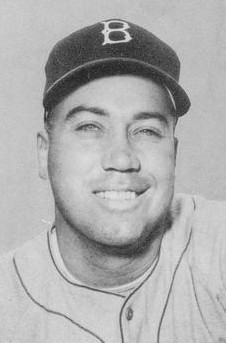
- Left to right: Willie Mays, Mickey Mantle, and Duke Snider, the award's namesakes.
- Sport: Baseball
- Awarded for: "Presented to a group of players or a specific team who are forever linked in baseball history."
- Location: New York City, U.S.
- Country: United States
- Presented by: Baseball Writers' Association of America, New York chapter

History
- First award: 1995
- Website: nybbwaa.com

The Willie, Mickey and the Duke Award is presented annually by the New York chapter of the Baseball Writers' Association of America to a group of players, or a specific team, who are linked together by a single event or common attribute in baseball history.

The award is named after and in honor of the inaugural winners who made up the iconic centerfield trio for each of the New York baseball teams in the 1950s: Willie Mays (New York Giants), Mickey Mantle (New York Yankees), and Duke Snider (Brooklyn Dodgers).

== Background ==
The award was created in 1995 by Claire Smith, then a sportswriter for The New York Times, in part due to worries that attendance at the annual Baseball Writers' Association of America dinner would be curtailed due to the ongoing baseball strike and in part to honor baseball people in baseball who were linked by a common attribute or an event.

The inaugural winners of the award were its namesakes: Willie Mays, Mickey Mantle, and Duke Snider, centerfielders of the Major League teams of New York City in the 1950s – the New York Giants, the New York Yankees, and the Brooklyn Dodgers.

The award has since been given annually to groups of players, managers, or coaches as well as iconic teams who are in some way linked together in baseball history.

== List of recipients ==
Year	Winners	Historical connection	Ref.
1995	Willie Mays	Trio of icon outfielders for the New York City Major League teams of the 1950s.	
1995	Mickey Mantle	Trio of icon outfielders for the New York City Major League teams of the 1950s.	
1995	Duke Snider	Trio of icon outfielders for the New York City Major League teams of the 1950s.	
1996	Phil Rizzuto	Trio of shortstops for the New York City Major League teams of the 1940s and 1950s.	
1996	Pee Wee Reese	Trio of shortstops for the New York City Major League teams of the 1940s and 1950s.	
1996	Alvin Dark	Trio of shortstops for the New York City Major League teams of the 1940s and 1950s.	
1997	Cleon Jones	Trio of outfielders for the 1969 New York Mets.	
1997	Tommie Agee	Trio of outfielders for the 1969 New York Mets.	
1997	Ron Swoboda	Trio of outfielders for the 1969 New York Mets.	
1998	Warren Spahn	Pitching duo of the 1940s Boston Braves, immortalized in the poem "Spahn and Sain, then Pray for Rain!".	
1998	Johnny Sain	Pitching duo of the 1940s Boston Braves, immortalized in the poem "Spahn and Sain, then Pray for Rain!".	
1999	Tom Seaver	Pitching duo who led the 1969 New York Mets to their first World Series title.	
1999	Jerry Koosman	Pitching duo who led the 1969 New York Mets to their first World Series title.	
2000	Don Larsen	Pitchers who threw perfect games for the New York Yankees.	
2000	David Wells	Pitchers who threw perfect games for the New York Yankees.	
2000	David Cone	Pitchers who threw perfect games for the New York Yankees.	
2001	Bobby Thomson	The shot heard 'round the world, iconic walk-off home run in the third game of 1951 National League tie-breaker series.	
2001	Ralph Branca	The shot heard 'round the world, iconic walk-off home run in the third game of 1951 National League tie-breaker series.	
2002	Joe Torre	Manager and coaches for three-peat World Series-winning New York Yankees (1998–2000).	
2002	Don Zimmer	Manager and coaches for three-peat World Series-winning New York Yankees (1998–2000).	
2002	Mel Stottlemyre	Manager and coaches for three-peat World Series-winning New York Yankees (1998–2000).	
2003	Bucky Dent	The tie-breaking home run in the 1978 American League East tie-breaker game.	
2003	Mike Torrez	The tie-breaking home run in the 1978 American League East tie-breaker game.	
2004	Keith Hernandez	Star first basemen of the 1980s New York City baseball teams.	
2004	Don Mattingly	Star first basemen of the 1980s New York City baseball teams.	
2005	1955 Brooklyn Dodgers	50th anniversary of the Dodgers' only title won in Brooklyn.	
2006	Bill Buckner	Buckner's error in Game 6 of the 1986 World Series.	
2006	Mookie Wilson	Buckner's error in Game 6 of the 1986 World Series.	
2007	Reggie Jackson	Jackson's three-homer game in Game 6 of the 1977 World Series.	
2007	Charlie Hough	Jackson's three-homer game in Game 6 of the 1977 World Series.	
2008	Bob Gibson	Top performers in the 1968 "year of the pitcher" season.	
2008	Denny McLain	Top performers in the 1968 "year of the pitcher" season.	
2008	Luis Tiant	Top performers in the 1968 "year of the pitcher" season.	
2009	Ed Kranepool	Career-long players for their respective New York teams.	
2009	Bernie Williams	Career-long players for their respective New York teams.	
2010	Derek Jeter	The "Core Four" teammates of the World Series-winning New York Yankees teams of the 1990s and 2000s.	
2010	Andy Pettitte	The "Core Four" teammates of the World Series-winning New York Yankees teams of the 1990s and 2000s.	
2010	Mariano Rivera	The "Core Four" teammates of the World Series-winning New York Yankees teams of the 1990s and 2000s.	
2010	Jorge Posada	The "Core Four" teammates of the World Series-winning New York Yankees teams of the 1990s and 2000s.	
2011	Joe Torre	Retiring long-time baseball managers.	
2011	Bobby Cox	Retiring long-time baseball managers.	
2011	Lou Piniella	Retiring long-time baseball managers.	
2012	1962 New York Mets	50th anniversary of the inaugural season of the "Amazin' Mets".	
2013	1973 New York Mets	40th anniversary of the unlikely pennant-winning run of the 1973 Mets, defined by pitcher Tug McGraw's catchphrase "Ya Gotta Believe!".	
2014	Henry Aaron	Aaron's 715th home run, breaking Babe Ruth's career home run record.	
2014	Al Downing	Aaron's 715th home run, breaking Babe Ruth's career home run record.	
2015	Sandy Koufax	Koufax's perfect game against the Chicago Cubs.	
2015	Bob Hendley	Koufax's perfect game against the Chicago Cubs.	
2015	Vin Scully	Koufax's perfect game against the Chicago Cubs.	
2016	Tim Hudson	Trio of ace pitchers for the Oakland Athletics, known collectively as the "Big Three".	
2016	Mark Mulder	Trio of ace pitchers for the Oakland Athletics, known collectively as the "Big Three".	
2016	Barry Zito	Trio of ace pitchers for the Oakland Athletics, known collectively as the "Big Three".	
2017	Dellin Betances	Trio of formidable relief pitchers for the 2016 New York Yankees, combining for 41 saves and a 2.35 earned run average over 148 appearances.	
2017	Aroldis Chapman	Trio of formidable relief pitchers for the 2016 New York Yankees, combining for 41 saves and a 2.35 earned run average over 148 appearances.	
2017	Andrew Miller	Trio of formidable relief pitchers for the 2016 New York Yankees, combining for 41 saves and a 2.35 earned run average over 148 appearances.	
2018	1998 New York Yankees	20th anniversary of the 1998 World Series-winning Yankees, the first of three consecutive titles.	
2019	1969 New York Mets	50th anniversary of the World Series-winning run by the "Miracle Mets".	
2020	Al Leiter	Go-ahead run in the top of the 9th-inning of Game 5 of the 2000 World Series, clinching a third consecutive title for the New York Yankees.	
2020	Luis Sojo	Go-ahead run in the top of the 9th-inning of Game 5 of the 2000 World Series, clinching a third consecutive title for the New York Yankees.	
2021	Mike Piazza	Iconic home run at Shea Stadium after the 9/11 attacks.	
2021	Steve Karsay	Iconic home run at Shea Stadium after the 9/11 attacks.	
2022	Cast and crew of A League of Their Own	30th anniversary of the release of the film on the All-American Girls Professional Baseball League.	
2023	Gary Cohen	Longest serving broadcasting team for the New York Mets.	
2023	Ron Darling	Longest serving broadcasting team for the New York Mets.	
2023	Keith Hernandez	Longest serving broadcasting team for the New York Mets.	
2024	John Olerud	Infield for the 1999 New York Mets, dubbed the "Best Infield Ever" by Sports Illustrated.	
2024	Edgardo Alfonzo	Infield for the 1999 New York Mets, dubbed the "Best Infield Ever" by Sports Illustrated.	
2024	Rey Ordóñez	Infield for the 1999 New York Mets, dubbed the "Best Infield Ever" by Sports Illustrated.	
2024	Robin Ventura	Infield for the 1999 New York Mets, dubbed the "Best Infield Ever" by Sports Illustrated.	
2025	Dave Winfield	Teammates on the 1980s New York Yankees teams.	
2025	Don Mattingly	Teammates on the 1980s New York Yankees teams.	

== See also ==
- List of BBWAA awards
- "Talking' Baseball (Willie, Mickey and the Duke)" – song by Terry Cashman.
