= Koufax (disambiguation) =

Sandy Koufax (born 1935) is an American baseball pitcher and member of the Baseball Hall of Fame.

Koufax may also refer to:

- Koufax (band), an indie rock band
- Koufax Curse, a baseball-related curse named after Sandy Koufax.

== See also ==
- Kovács
