= Byron Browne (baseball) =

American baseball player (born 1942)

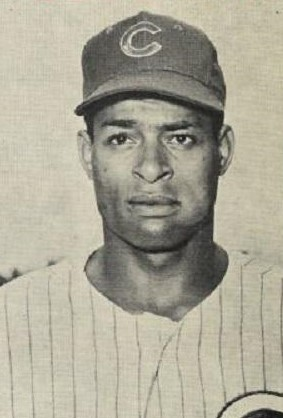
- Outfielder
- Born: December 27, 1942 (age 82); Saint Joseph, Missouri, U.S.
- Batted: Right Threw: Right

MLB debut
- September 9, 1965, for the Chicago Cubs

Last MLB appearance
- June 18, 1972, for the Philadelphia Phillies

MLB statistics
- Batting average: .236
- Home runs: 30
- Runs batted in: 102
- Stats at Baseball Reference

Teams
- Chicago Cubs (1965–1967); Houston Astros (1968); St. Louis Cardinals (1969); Philadelphia Phillies (1970–1972)

Byron Ellis Browne (born December 27, 1942) is an American former professional baseball outfielder, who played in Major League Baseball (MLB) for the Chicago Cubs, Houston Astros, St. Louis Cardinals, and Philadelphia Phillies, between 1965 and 1972. He attended Central High School in St. Joseph, MO.

Browne was signed by the Pittsburgh Pirates as an amateur free agent, on September 9, 1962, then was drafted by the Cubs from the Pirates in the 1963 first-year draft.

He made his Major League debut for the Cubs on September 9, 1965. Facing future Hall of Famer Sandy Koufax in his first at-bat Browne lined out to deep center field in the second inning of the pitcher's perfect game; he subsequently grounded out to short in the fifth and struck out in the eighth.

After a productive rookie season in 1966, Browne played most of 1967 for the Double-A Dallas-Fort Worth Spurs. In all, he played in parts of three seasons with the Cubs, hitting .236, with 16 home runs, in 134 games. Browne also led the league in strikeouts in 1966, with 143.

Browne was traded by the Cubs to the Astros, on May 4, 1968, in return for Aaron Pointer but only played in 10 games with the Astros, totaling three hits in 19 at-bats. The Cardinals purchased Browne from the Astros, on February 12, 1969, where he appeared in 22 games, while hitting .226, spending most of the season with the Triple-A Tulsa Oilers. Browne was traded to the Phillies, along with Curt Flood, Tim McCarver, and Joe Hoerner, for Dick Allen, Cookie Rojas, and Jerry Johnson, on October 7, 1969. He played the rest of his MLB career for Philadelphia.

Browne's son (Byron Browne, Jr.) played 10 years in the Milwaukee Brewers farm system.
