= Don Young (baseball) =

American baseball player (1945–2024)

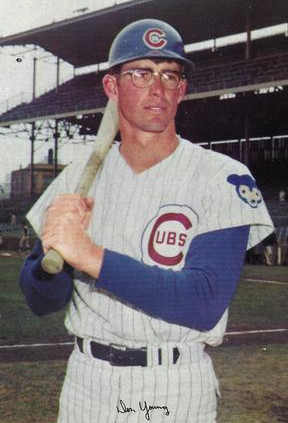
- Young in 1969
- Outfielder
- Born: October 18, 1945 (age 80); Houston, Texas, U.S.
- Died: November 21, 2024; Mesa, Arizona, U.S.
- Batted: Right Threw: Right

MLB debut
- September 9, 1965, for the Chicago Cubs

Last MLB appearance
- October 1, 1969, for the Chicago Cubs

MLB statistics
- Batting average: .218
- Home runs: 7
- Runs batted in: 29
- Stats at Baseball Reference

Teams
- Chicago Cubs (1965, 1969)

Donald Wayne Young (October 18, 1945 – November 21, 2024) was an American professional baseball player. He played two seasons in Major League Baseball in 1965 and 1969, primarily as a center fielder.

Young was signed by the St. Louis Cardinals as an amateur free agent in 1963. In his first major league at bat, he popped up to become the first out in Sandy Koufax's 1965 perfect game. He played only 11 games in 1965, and then spent three years in the minors before coming up to the Cubs again, playing 101 games in the tumultuous 1969 season.

In the ninth inning of a game against the New York Mets on July 8, 1969, playing centerfield, Young failed to catch balls hit by Ken Boswell and Donn Clendenon. Both were ruled doubles. Young had Clendenon's ball in his mitt before crashing into the wall; with Boswell stopping at third thinking the ball was caught. A Cleon Jones double followed that tied the game. After an intentional walk to Art Shamsky a single by Ed Kranepool plated Jones with the winning run. The line score in the 9th inning was 3 runs on 4 hits with two left on with no errors. Ferguson Jenkins went the distance in the loss. After the game manager Leo Durocher blamed Young for the loss. Among other things, Durocher said, "My 3-year-old could have caught those balls." Teammate Ron Santo also loudly criticized Young in the clubhouse accusing him of letting his concern about hitting influence his fielding. The next day Santo apologized to Young and called a press conference to make a public apology. The Cubs, who had a nine-game lead as late as Aug. 16, went on to lose the pennant by eight games to the Mets.

The Bill James Historical Baseball Abstract and the book Baseball Hall of Shame 2 both state that a greater factor was manager Leo Durocher not resting his regular players who played all their home games in Wrigley Field, before it installed lights, under the Chicago sun.

Young played two more partial seasons in the minor leagues before leaving organized baseball.

== Sources ==
- Career statistics from Baseball Reference · Baseball Reference (Minors) · Retrosheet · Baseball Almanac
