= Sandy Koufax's perfect game =

Baseball feat by Major League pitcher in 1965

- Sandy Koufax's perfect game was also his fourth career no-hitter, a then-Major League record
Chicago Cubs	Los Angeles Dodgers
0	1
	1	2	3	4	5	6	7	8	9	R	H	E
Chicago Cubs	0	0	0	0	0	0	0	0	0	0	0	1
Los Angeles Dodgers	0	0	0	0	1	0	0	0	-	1	1	0
- Date: September 9, 1965
- Venue: Dodger Stadium
- City: Los Angeles, California
- Managers: Lou Klein (Chicago Cubs); Walter Alston (Los Angeles Dodgers)
- Umpires: HP: Ed Vargo; 1B: Chris Pelekoudas; 2B: Bill Jackowski; 3B: Paul Pryor
- Attendance: 29,139
- Time of game: 1:43

On September 9, 1965, Sandy Koufax of the Los Angeles Dodgers pitched a perfect game in the National League against the Chicago Cubs at Dodger Stadium.

Koufax became the sixth pitcher of the modern era, and eighth overall, to throw a perfect game. He was also the first left-handed pitcher to throw a perfect game and the first pitcher to throw a perfect game at night. It was Koufax's fourth no-hitter, breaking Bob Feller's Major League record of three. He also became the first pitcher to throw a no-hitter in four consecutive seasons. Koufax struck out fourteen batters, the most in a perfect game. He also struck out at least one batter in all nine innings, the only perfect game pitcher to do so to date. During the game, Koufax threw 113 pitches, 79 of which were strikes.

The game was also notable for the high quality of the performance by the opposing pitcher, Bob Hendley of the Cubs. Hendley gave up only one hit and allowed only two baserunners. Both pitchers had no-hitters intact until the seventh inning. The only run that the Dodgers scored was unearned. The game holds the record for fewest baserunners in a game, with two, and the fewest hits in a game. The only hit by either team was by Lou Johnson of the Dodgers, who was also the only baserunner.

Koufax's perfect game is a memorable part of baseball lore, particularly since it was not televised. The game was immortalized by Dodgers' play-by-play announcer Vin Scully who instructed the radio crew to record the final inning of the perfect game. He later gifted the recording to Koufax, as he had done so with the pitcher's previous three no-hitters. Scully's call of Koufax's perfect game is often cited as one of the greatest and most memorable calls in the history of baseball.

== Game summary ==
On September 9, 1965, the second-place Dodgers were playing at home against the eighth-place Chicago Cubs. Bob Hendley, the starting pitcher for the Cubs, was just up from the minor leagues and had a 2–2 record while Koufax, the starting pitcher for the Dodgers, had a record of 21–7 but had not won a game in three weeks.

Koufax retired the first batter he faced, Donald Young, a late season call-up, on a pop-up on the second pitch of the game. Glenn Beckert, another rookie, struck out looking at a curveball after hitting a line drive down the first base line just barely foul. The third batter, Billy Williams, also struck out looking at a curve ball.

In the second inning, Ron Santo fouled out to catcher Jeff Torborg, Ernie Banks struck out on a forkball, and Byron Browne, during his first major league at-bat, lined out to center fielder Willie Davis. Koufax got Chris Krug to line out to center field to start off the third inning. Following him, Don Kessinger flew out on an 0–2 pitch and Hendley struck out. In the fourth inning, Koufax got Young to fly out to the first baseman and Beckert to fly out to right. Koufax then struck out Williams a second time.

In the top half of the fifth inning, the Cubs went three up, three down with Santo flying out, Banks striking out for the second time in the game, and Browne grounding out. By the bottom of the fifth, neither team had reached first base. That changed when Hendley walked Lou Johnson on a three-and-two pitch that could have gone either way. Ron Fairly dropped a sacrifice bunt that Hendley bobbled, leaving his only play at first base. On the first pitch to Jim Lefebvre, Johnson stole third base. The Cubs' catcher Krug threw the ball over Santo's head and into left field, which allowed Johnson to score. The Dodgers had scored a run without an official at-bat or RBI.

The bottom of the order came up in the sixth inning for the Cubs. Krug grounded the ball to shortstop Maury Wills, who threw it in the dirt to first baseman Wes Parker. Parker managed to dig the ball out to save the play and Koufax's perfect game. Kessinger hit a dribbler down the third base line, but Jim Gilliam was playing shallow (to guard against the bunt) and threw him out by half a step. Hendley, who still had a no-hitter going of his own, struck out on three pitches.

"Two and two to Harvey Kuenn, one strike away. Sandy into his windup, here's the pitch: Swung on and missed, a perfect game!"

— Vin Scully's call of the final out of Koufax's perfect game.

At the start of the seventh inning, Koufax threw one pitch that sailed past Young and went all the way to the backstop. He quickly recovered, however, and struck out Young. Beckert was next; he flew out to right field. Williams started out with three straight balls. Koufax's next two pitches were fastballs right down the middle. Williams let the first one go and fouled off the second one; he ended up hitting a pop fly to left field on the next pitch. During the bottom of the seventh inning, Johnson broke up Hendley's no-hitter with a bloop hit behind the second baseman. By the time Banks reached it, Johnson was on second base. Fairly grounded out to second, stranding Johnson on second base.

The heart of the Chicago order came up in the eighth inning, and Koufax struck out all three of them. Banks, who struck out for the third time, never made contact the entire game. The Dodgers went three up and three down in the bottom half of the inning. Koufax again struck out the side in the ninth inning to secure the perfect game. The final out was made by Harvey Kuenn, who also made the final out of Koufax's 1963 no-hitter against the San Francisco Giants.

== Aftermath ==
Until Cole Hamels of the Philadelphia Phillies no-hit the Cubs on July 25, 2015, the perfect game had been the last no-hitter to be pitched against them. They had gone the longest of all Major League teams since a no-hitter was last pitched against them—a span of 7,920 games.

In a 1995 poll of members of the Society for American Baseball Research (SABR), Koufax's perfect game was selected as the greatest game ever pitched. Additionally, Vin Scully's call of the ninth inning of the perfect game is often cited as one of the greatest and most memorable calls in the history of baseball.

Sportswriter Jane Leavy structured her biography on Koufax, Sandy Koufax: A Lefty's Legacy, around a re-telling of the game.

In 2014, Koufax, Hendley, and Scully (who called the perfect game on radio) were awarded the Willie, Mickey and the Duke Award by the New York chapter of the Baseball Writers' Association of America, an award which recognizes groups of people forever intrinsically tied in baseball history.

== Game statistics ==
September 9, Dodger Stadium, Los Angeles, California

Team	1	2	3	4	5	6	7	8	9	R	H	E
Chicago	0	0	0	0	0	0	0	0	0	0	0	1
Los Angeles	0	0	0	0	1	0	0	0	–	1	1	0
WP: Sandy Koufax (22–7) LP: Bob Hendley (2–3)

Chicago	AB	R	H	RBI	BB	SO	AVG
Don Young, CF	3	0	0	0	0	1	.000
Glenn Beckert, 2B	3	0	0	0	0	1	.224
Billy Williams, RF	3	0	0	0	0	2	.307
Ron Santo, 3B	3	0	0	0	0	1	.284
Ernie Banks, 1B	3	0	0	0	0	3	.269
Byron Browne, LF	3	0	0	0	0	1	.000
Chris Krug, C	3	0	0	0	0	1	.216
Don Kessinger, SS	2	0	0	0	0	0	.211
Joey Amalfitano, PH	1	0	0	0	0	1	.280
Bob Hendley, P	2	0	0	0	0	2	.000
Harvey Kuenn, PH	1	0	0	0	0	1	.223
Totals	27	0	0	0	0	14	.000

Chicago	IP	H	R	ER	BB	SO	HR	ERA
Bob Hendley	8	1	1	0	1	3	0	7.00
Totals	8	1	1	0	1	3	0	0.00

Los Angeles	AB	R	H	RBI	BB	SO	AVG
Maury Wills, SS	3	0	0	0	0	0	.291
Jim Gilliam, 3B	3	0	0	0	0	0	.279
John Kennedy, 3B	0	0	0	0	0	0	.173
Willie Davis, CF	3	0	0	0	0	0	.248
Lou Johnson, LF	2	1	1	0	1	0	.260
Ron Fairly, RF	2	0	0	0	0	0	.276
Jim Lefebvre, 2B	3	0	0	0	0	2	.239
Dick Tracewski, 2B	0	0	0	0	0	0	.213
Wes Parker, 1B	3	0	0	0	0	0	.235
Jeff Torborg, C	3	0	0	0	0	0	.254
Sandy Koufax, P	2	0	0	0	0	1	.178
Totals	24	1	1	0	1	3	.042

Los Angeles	IP	H	R	ER	BB	SO	HR	ERA
Sandy Koufax	9	0	0	0	0	14	0	2.14
Totals	9	0	0	0	0	14	0	0.00
