= Lewis Yocum =

American physician

- Born: November 8, 1947; Chicago, Illinois, U.S.
- Died: May 25, 2013 (aged 65); Manhattan Beach, California, U.S.
- Education: Western Illinois University

Lewis Yocum (November 8, 1947 – May 25, 2013) was an American orthopedic surgeon.

Born in Chicago, Illinois, Yocum earned his undergraduate degree at Western Illinois University in 1969, his medical doctorate at the University of Illinois in 1973, after which he completed both his internship and residency at Northwestern University in Chicago.

Yocum gained prestige by extending the careers of several Major League Baseball players, by repairing injuries that once would have ended their playing days. He also served as the team physician to the Los Angeles Angels major league club during 36 years, and was a specialist consultant to numerous dance companies based in Los Angeles.

Specialized in sports medicine, shoulder, elbow and knees, Yocum worked along with Frank Jobe, who performed the original Tommy John surgery. He was also a panel reviewer for the American Journal of Sports Medicine, a board trustee at Centinela Hospital Medical Center, and authored numerous publications and books. The Los Angeles Kerlan-Jobe Orthopaedic Clinic was founded by Jobe, who shared the workplace and a close friendship with Yocum for 35 years.

The careers of big leaguers benefited from Yocum's expertise, among others pitchers Ted Lilly (knee), Stephen Strasburg (Tommy John), C. J. Wilson (elbow) and Jordan Zimmermann (Tommy John), as well as outfielder Jacoby Ellsbury (ribs), slugger Kendry Morales (leg repair) and infielder Dustin Pedroia (foot).

In May 2013, the Angels club named their training room in his honor, with pitcher Jered Weaver placing a placard with Yocum's name above the room's door in the clubhouse. Although Yocum never operated on Weaver, the pitcher often talked with him about anything he was feeling.

Yocum died in Manhattan Beach, California at the age of 65, following complications from liver cancer. He was married to Elizabeth B. Yocum with whom he had two children.
