= Frank Jobe =

American orthopedic surgeon and co-founder of the Kerlan-Jobe Orthopaedic Clinic

- Jobe at Dodger Stadium in 2008
- Born: Frank Wilson Jobe; July 16, 1925; Greensboro, North Carolina, U.S.
- Died: March 6, 2014 (aged 88); Santa Monica, California, U.S.
- Education: La Sierra University; Loma Linda University
- Occupation: Orthopedic surgeon
- Known for: Inventor of Tommy John surgery
- Spouse: Beverly Jobe
- Children: 4

Frank Wilson Jobe (July 16, 1925 – March 6, 2014) was an American orthopedic surgeon and co-founder of the Kerlan-Jobe Orthopaedic Clinic. Jobe pioneered both elbow ligament replacement and major reconstructive shoulder surgery for baseball players.

In 1974, Jobe performed the first "Tommy John surgery" on then-Los Angeles Dodgers pitcher Tommy John. The procedure has become so prevalent an estimated one-third of all major league pitchers have undergone it. Jobe also performed the first major reconstructive shoulder surgery on a big league player in 1990, which allowed Dodger star Orel Hershiser to continue his career. Jobe served as a special medical adviser to the Dodgers until his death.

== Early life ==
Frank Jobe was born in 1925 in Greensboro, North Carolina. After graduating from Collegedale Academy in Collegedale, Tennessee in 1943, he enlisted in the United States Army and reported to Camp Barkeley for training. Serving in World War II as a medical staff sergeant in the Army's 101st Airborne Division, he landed by glider at Normandy and later was briefly captured during the Siege of Bastogne in the Battle of the Bulge. Successfully escaping, he went on to be awarded the Bronze Star Medal, Combat Medical Badge, and Glider Badge with one star.

== Career ==
=== Early years ===
After the war, Jobe enrolled in Southern Missionary College with help from the G.I. Bill. He completed his bachelor's degree at La Sierra University and went on to medical school at Loma Linda University, receiving his MD in 1956. He worked for three years as a general practitioner before completing a residency in orthopedic surgery at the Los Angeles County Hospital.

In 1964 Jobe began to consult with the Los Angeles Dodgers. He teamed with Robert Kerlan to specialize in the developing field of sports medicine. The duo co-founded the Southwestern Orthopaedic Medical Group in 1965, later renamed the Kerlan-Jobe Orthopaedic Clinic. Jobe officially joined the Dodgers' medical staff in 1968.

Along with the Dodgers, the clinic supervised medical treatment for the California Angels of Major League Baseball, the Los Angeles Rams of the National Football League, and the Los Angeles Lakers of the National Basketball Association. They eventually worked for the Los Angeles Kings and the Anaheim Ducks of the National Hockey League, as well as a large number of other professional and amateur athletes from across the country.

=== Tommy John surgery ===
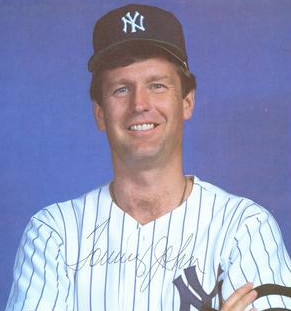
Tommy John, in 1981

On September 25, 1974, Jobe made sports medicine history when he performed the first reconstruction of the ulnar collateral ligament of the elbow (UCL) using a revolutionary procedure he had devised.

What has since become commonly known as Tommy John surgery rescued the career of Los Angeles Dodger pitcher Tommy John, a 12-year veteran who went on to pitch an astonishing 14 more seasons after a year off recovering.

In 1982, he performed the procedure on Japanese Baseball Hall of Fame pitcher Choji Murata, the first such procedure in Japan.

Jobe was unsure the procedure's benefits would last, so he waited two years before performing the second UCL reconstruction. After success with several more baseball players and a javelin thrower, Jobe became confident in its lasting benefits. The findings of UCL reconstruction were published in the Journal of Bone and Joint Surgery in 1986.

In the four decades since its inception elbow ligament replacement has become common practice for pitchers and players at all levels of baseball, with an estimated one-third of all Major League pitchers in 2014 having undergone it. What Jobe had estimated as a 1 in 100 prospect of a complete recovery for John had risen to 85–92 percent by 2009.

For baseball players, full rehabilitation takes about one year for pitchers and about six months for position players. Players typically begin throwing about 16 weeks after surgery. Prior to his surgery, John had won 124 games. He won 164 after surgery, retiring in 1989 at age 46. Other pitchers to extend their careers after Tommy John surgery include Stephen Strasburg, David Wells, A. J. Burnett, Francisco Liriano, Chris Carpenter, Tim Hudson, John Smoltz, Joe Nathan, Brian Wilson, Billy Wagner, and Matt Harvey. Sandy Koufax once asked Jobe "why didn’t you do that on me?" Jobe's response was that if he had only invented the procedure ten years earlier it would have been known as the "Sandy Koufax surgery."

The initial Tommy John surgery, John's return to pitching success, and the relationship between the two men was the subject of a 2013 ESPN 30 for 30 Shorts documentary.

=== Shoulder reconstruction surgery ===
In 1990, Jobe performed major reconstructive surgery on the shoulder of Dodgers pitcher Orel Hershiser's throwing arm, the first time this procedure was used on a major league player. In this surgery, he pioneered a new procedure that reduced the amount of trauma suffered by tissue during the surgery. The surgery allowed Hershiser to continue his career, and the procedure continues to be used.

=== Later years ===
Jobe served as Clinical Professor, Department of Orthopedics, for The Keck School of Medicine at the University of Southern California. For 40 years, Jobe served as the team physician for the Los Angeles Dodgers, remaining on their medical staff through 2008. At the time of his death he was a special advisor to the chairman of the Dodger organization. He had also been the orthopedic consultant for professional golf's PGA Tour, PGA Tour Champions and Senior PGA Championship for 26 years, and named the emeritus physician for the PGA Tour. Jobe mentored Lewis Yocum, who was one of the best orthopedic surgeons in baseball when he died in May 2013.

Jobe authored over 140 medical publications, wrote 30 book chapters, and edited seven books. He received three honorary doctorates, two from the United States and one from Japan.

== Personal life ==
Jobe met his future wife Beverly Anderson while working as a general practitioner and she was referred to him as a patient. Rather than treat her himself, he had another doctor treat her so the pair could date. They had four sons, who had eight grandchildren.

Jobe underwent coronary artery bypass surgery on four arteries in 2002 and had a defibrillator implanted in 2010. He died on March 6, 2014, at the age of 88, in Santa Monica, California. Jobe was a lifelong member of the Seventh-day Adventist Church.

== Legacy ==
Baseball Commissioner Bud Selig issued a statement on Jobe's death saying, "I was deeply saddened to learn of the loss of Dr. Frank Jobe, a great gentleman whose work in baseball revolutionized sports medicine. Since 1974, his groundbreaking Tommy John surgery has revitalized countless careers, especially those of our pitchers." Steve Dilbeck of The Los Angeles Times referred to Jobe as a "legend" and said "it could be argued that Jobe is the greatest orthopedic surgeon in history", while James Andrews called Jobe "one of the premier fathers of modern sports medicine", saying that "without his influence, baseball players' sports-medicine care would probably still be in the dark ages."

Jobe was inducted into the Baseball Reliquary's Shrine of the Eternals in 2012.

=== Hall of Fame consideration ===
Jobe's name has periodically been informally mentioned by sportswriters, fans, and players alike as worthy of a nomination for the National Baseball Hall of Fame. In August 2012, an official campaign Web site to have Frank Jobe honored by the National Baseball Hall of Fame was launched.

Jobe was honored during Hall of Fame weekend on July 27, 2013, in Cooperstown, New York. Hall of Fame president Jeff Idelson said Jobe's work is a testament to the positive role of medicine in baseball's growth. Tommy John attended, praising Jobe by saying, "I think there should be a medical wing in the Hall of Fame, starting with him."
