= Observance of Yom Kippur by Jewish athletes =

Since the early 20th-century, numerous Jewish athletes have chosen not to play on Yom Kippur, the holiest day of the year in Judaism. As one of the most culturally significant Jewish holidays, Yom Kippur is observed by many secular Jews who may not observe other holidays. Jews observing the holiday participate in full fasting and asceticism.

The most famous example is baseball player Sandy Koufax of the Los Angeles Dodgers who refused to pitch Game 1 of the 1965 World Series when it fell on Yom Kippur. Years prior, Hank Greenberg of the Detroit Tigers took a similar stance and sat out during a tight pennant race.

Incidents such as those of Greenberg and Koufax throw into sharp highlight the conflict many Jewish people face between social pressures and personal beliefs on a daily basis. Athletes observing Yom Kippur are often lauded for their decision not to play, which is also seen as a source of pride by many in the Jewish community.

== Notable examples ==
Sandy Koufax, ace pitcher and Hall of Famer for the Los Angeles Dodgers, famously sat out Game 1 of the 1965 World Series due to it coinciding with Yom Kippur

One of the earliest known examples of a player sitting out Yom Kippur was that of Baseball Hall of Fame first baseman Hank Greenberg, who attracted national attention in 1934, when he refused to play on Yom Kippur, even though the Tigers were in the middle of a pennant race. Columnist and poet Edgar A. Guest expressed the general opinion in a poem titled "Came Yom Kippur: Speaking of Greenberg". The poem, published in the Detroit Free Press, ends with the lines:

We shall miss him on the infield and shall miss him at the bat.
But he's true to his religion – and I honor him for that!

The Detroit press and a number of fans did not take kindly to Greenberg's decision, particularly since the Tigers lost to the New York Yankees 5–2, partly due to Greenberg's absence from the lineup. However, in his autobiography, Greenberg recalled that, much to his embarrassment, he received a standing ovation from congregants at Congregation Shaarey Zedek when he arrived for the services on Yom Kippur.

Following Greenberg's footsteps, and arguably the most famous example of an athlete not playing on the Day of Atonement is that of Sandy Koufax. Koufax refused to pitch Game 1 of the 1965 World Series because it fell on Yom Kippur, garnering national attention for his decision which was seen an example of the conflict between social pressures and personal beliefs. Throughout his career, Koufax did not pitch on any of the High Holy Days, reportedly even having it written into his contract. A secular Jew, Koufax opted to remain in his hotel room that day and, contrary to many rumors at the time, did not attend any Yom Kippur service.

The importance of Koufax's decision is shown by the fact that writer Armin Rosen coined the term "Koufax Curse" in reference to a theory that Jewish players who do not follow Koufax's footsteps supposedly play badly if they chose to play on Yom Kippur.

Los Angeles Dodgers outfielder Shawn Green, similarly, made headlines in 2001 for sitting out a game for the first time in 415 games (then the longest streak among active players) on Yom Kippur, even though his team was in the middle of a playoff race. Other baseball players who have similarly sat out games on Yom Kippur include Kevin Youkilis, Brad Ausmus, and Art Shamsky.

Football player Gabe Carimi, at the time an All-American left tackle in American football who won the 2010 Outland Trophy as the nation's top collegiate interior lineman, faced a conflict in his freshman year of college in 2007. That year Yom Kippur fell on a Saturday, and he fasted until an hour before his football game against Iowa started that night. Carimi said, "Religion is a part of me, and I don't want to just say I'm Jewish. I actually do make sacrifices that I know are hard choices." In 2004, Matt Bernstein, standout fullback at University of Wisconsin–Madison, fasted on Yom Kippur, then broke his fast on the sidelines before rushing for 123 yards in a game against Penn State.

In 2011, golfer Laetitia Beck declined a request to join the University of North Carolina Tar Heels Invitational competition, because it conflicted with Yom Kippur. Instead, she spent the day fasting and praying. She said: "My Judaism is very important to me, and ... on Yom Kippur, no matter what, I have to fast." Boris Gelfand, Israel's top chess player, played his game in the prestigious London Grand Prix Chess Tournament on 25 September 2012 (eve of Yom Kippur) earlier, to avoid playing on the holiday.

In 2013, the International Tennis Federation fined the Israel Tennis Association "more than $13,000 ... for the inconvenience" of having to reschedule a tennis match between the Israeli and Belgian teams that was originally scheduled on Yom Kippur. Dudi Sela, Israel's #1 player, quit his quarterfinal match in the third set of the 2017 Shenzhen Open so he could begin observing Yom Kippur by the time the sun set, forfeiting a possible $34,000 in prize money and 90 rankings points.

NBA player Deni Avdija sat out his first preseason game with the Portland Trail Blazers in 2024 to observe Yom Kippur.

At the 46th Chess Olympiad in 2026, the Israeli men's and women's teams forfeited their sixth-round matches against the Netherlands and Bulgaria, respectively, rather than play on Yom Kippur, after their opponents declined to reschedule the games. Both matches were awarded as 4–0 victories to their opponents.

== See also ==
- List of Jews in sport
