= Robert Kerlan =

American orthopedic surgeon

- Born: May 13, 1922; Aitkin, Minnesota, U.S.
- Died: September 8, 1996 (aged 74); Santa Monica, California, U.S.
- Education: University of Southern California
- Occupations: Orthopedic surgeon, Sports physician
- Spouse: Rachel Kerlan
- Children: 3

Robert K. Kerlan (May 13, 1922 – September 8, 1996) was an American orthopedic surgeon and sports physician who, along with Frank Jobe, was co-founder of the Kerlan-Jobe Orthopaedic Clinic. He treated numerous star athletes during his career and was regarded as a pioneer in the discipline of sports medicine.

== Early life and education ==
Kerlan was born in Aitkin, Minnesota and graduated from Aitkin High School where he was a star athlete.

Kerlan attended UCLA where he started college as a basketball letterman, but eventually gave up playing. He completed his studies from the University of Southern California, graduating from the USC School of Medicine in 1948.

== Career ==
He began his career by volunteering to be a team physician for schools and colleges in the Los Angeles area. After the Dodgers moved from Brooklyn and became the Los Angeles Dodgers in 1958, he became their first team doctor. Kerlan went on to also become the team physician for other Los Angeles-based sports teams including the Rams, Lakers, and Kings.

Kerlan was the doctor who diagnosed Dodgers star pitcher Sandy Koufax with traumatic arthritis in his left elbow. Additionally, he also treated tennis star Rod Laver, and basketball star Elgin Baylor, amongst others.

Kerlan remained active in his sports medicine practice despite a long-standing case of arthritis that required him to use crutches periodically for years, and permanently after 1977. He was also a clinical professor in the USC Department of Orthopaedic Surgery and later became founding member of the American Orthopaedic Society for Sports Medicine.

In 1996, he was inducted into the Southern California Jewish Sports Hall of Fame.

== Death ==
Kerlan died in Santa Monica, California at age 74 in 1996; he was survived by his wife Rachel and his three children. The cause of death was reported as pneumonia, after years of ill health.

The day after his death, the Los Angeles Dodgers lowered the flags at Dodger Stadium to half-mast and held a minute's silence in honor of Kerlan.
