= Bob Hendley =

American baseball player (born 1939)

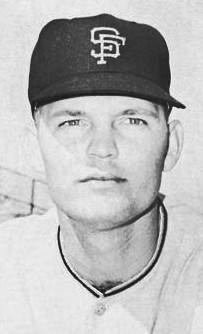
- Hendley with the Giants, c. 1965
- Pitcher
- Born: April 30, 1939 (age 87); Macon, Georgia, U.S.
- Batted: Right Threw: Left

MLB debut
- June 23, 1961, for the Milwaukee Braves

Last MLB appearance
- September 3, 1967, for the New York Mets

MLB statistics
- Win–loss record: 48–52
- Earned run average: 3.97
- Strikeouts: 522
- Stats at Baseball Reference

Teams
- Milwaukee Braves (1961–1963); San Francisco Giants (1964–1965); Chicago Cubs (1965–1967); New York Mets (1967)

Robert Charles Hendley (born April 30, 1939) is an American former professional baseball player. A left-handed pitcher, he appeared in all or parts of seven seasons in Major League Baseball for the Milwaukee Braves (1961–1963), San Francisco Giants (1964–1965), Chicago Cubs (1965–1967) and New York Mets (1967).

Hendley is best known for being the losing pitcher on the day Sandy Koufax threw his perfect game. He was nearly as brilliant: carrying a no-hitter into the seventh inning, he gave up only one hit and one unearned run that scored on a throwing error by his catcher, Chris Krug.

== Early life and career ==
Born in Macon, Georgia, the 6 ft 2 in (1.88 m), 190 lb (86 kg) Hendley graduated from Lanier High School and attended Mercer University. He signed with the Braves in 1958, and was in his fourth season in the Milwaukee organization when he made his MLB debut on June 23, 1961, a starting assignment against the Cubs at Wrigley Field. He battled into the eighth inning of a 2–2 tie, but left the game with the bases loaded and one out; two inherited runners then scored (one run was unearned), and Hendley took the 5–3 loss.

He was a member of the Braves' starting rotation in both 1962 and 1963, then was traded to the Giants in a six-player deal on December 3, 1963; one of the three players the Braves received was Felipe Alou. Hendley was a member of the 1964 Giants' starting rotation, but began 1965 in the bullpen, making only two abbreviated starts among his first eight mound appearances. On May 28, Hendley, Harvey Kuenn and Ed Bailey were traded to the Cubs for Dick Bertell and Len Gabrielson. Although Hendley would be sent to Triple-A Salt Lake City for seven games, he was able to return to a starting pitcher role for the Cubs upon his recall, leading to his two September matches against Koufax.

In 1966, Hendley became primarily a relief pitcher, earning seven saves for a Cub team that lost 103 games that season. The following year, he was traded to the Mets on June 12, where, although he was again largely used out of the bullpen, he registered the last two complete games of his MLB career. The 1967 season also produced Hendley's only above-.500 record, as he won five of eight decisions.

In his seven-season MLB career, Hendley won 48 games and lost 52, with a 3.97 ERA in 216 games, 126 of them starts. He struck out 522 batters and allowed 329 bases on balls and 864 hits in 879 1/3 innings pitched. He notched 25 complete games, six shutouts and 13 saves. He pitched at Triple-A for the Mets in 1968 and 1969 before leaving baseball. After retiring from the game, he went on to coach in his hometown of Macon at two high schools, posting winning records at each.

=== Back-to-back 1965 battles with Koufax ===
Hendley's career was hampered by elbow miseries. But he is perhaps best remembered for his match-ups against Baseball Hall of Fame left-hander Sandy Koufax of the Los Angeles Dodgers for two classic pitchers' duels while Hendley was a member of the 1965 Cubs.

On September 9 at Dodger Stadium, Hendley allowed only one hit, but Koufax threw a perfect game and defeated Hendley, 1–0. The one run Hendley gave up came in the fifth inning and was unearned. It came without the benefit of a hit: the Dodgers' Lou Johnson took a base on balls (Hendley's only free pass of the game), moved to second base on a sacrifice bunt, stole third base, and came around to score on a throwing error by the Cubs' catcher. Although now trailing in the game, Hendley was still throwing a no-hitter. Two innings later, however, Johnson got his club's only safety, a pop fly over the head of Cub first baseman Ernie Banks that fell for a double. The walk and bloop hit were the only baserunners that Hendley permitted. Koufax's no-hitter was his fourth (over four consecutive seasons) and his only perfect game. He struck out 14 Cubs, including the last six hitters in a row.

Five days later, the two pitchers faced each other in a rematch at Wrigley Field. That time, Hendley gave up four hits and three bases on balls, but defeated Koufax 2–1.
