= Koufax Curse =

Theory regarding Jewish baseball players and Yom Kippur

Sandy Koufax, namesake of the supposed "curse"

In Major League Baseball, the Koufax Curse refers the theory that a Jewish player who plays on Yom Kippur, the holiest day of the Jewish calendar, is doomed to play badly that day. The namesake of the curse comes from Hall of Fame pitcher Sandy Koufax who famously sat out Game 1 of the 1965 World Series to mark Yom Kippur.

The term was coined by writer Armin Rosen during the 2019 Major League Baseball postseason, after three Jewish players–Joc Pederson, Alex Bregman, and Max Fried–opted to play on Yom Kippur only for their teams to lose. Though Koufax was not the first player to sit out the Jewish holiday, with Hank Greenberg doing so before Koufax, his example remains the most famous due to it occurring in the World Series rather than the regular season.

Professor Howard Wasserman, a professor and baseball enthusiast, wrote in the National Journal, the official publication of the Society for American Baseball Research, detailing 18 pitchers and 18 position players who were Jewish and what they did when they faced the decision to play on Yom Kippur and whether the curse actually existed. He determined that while players perform well enough if they played on the day, their teams performed worse overall:

Any curse appears to target not Jewish players, but their non-Jewish teammates, with consequences befalling the whole team. Perhaps this warrants a new approach to Yom Kippur — teams should welcome and encourage Jewish players to sit these games. The media can retire the historic narrative of a dilemma between team and faith or of a player letting his teammates down by missing one game that could decide the season.

== See also ==
- Jews in baseball
- Observance of Yom Kippur by Jewish athletes
