= Lou Johnson =

American baseball player (1934–2020)

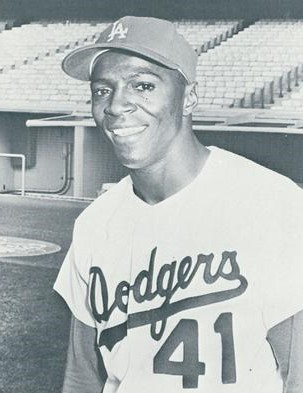
- Outfielder
- Born: September 22, 1934; Lexington, Kentucky, U.S.
- Died: October 1, 2020 (aged 86); Los Angeles, California, U.S.
- Batted: Right Threw: Right

MLB debut
- April 17, 1960, for the Chicago Cubs

Last MLB appearance
- September 6, 1969, for the California Angels

MLB statistics
- Batting average: .258
- Home runs: 48
- Runs batted in: 232
- Stats at Baseball Reference

Teams
- Chicago Cubs (1960); Los Angeles Angels (1961); Milwaukee Braves (1962); Los Angeles Dodgers (1965–1967); Chicago Cubs (1968); Cleveland Indians (1968); California Angels (1969)

Career highlights and awards
- World Series champion (1965)

Louis Brown Johnson (September 22, 1934 – October 1, 2020), nicknamed "Sweet Lou," was an American Major League Baseball outfielder. Johnson's professional baseball career lasted for 17 seasons, and included 8 years in the majors: parts of 1960–1962 and 1965, and then the full seasons of 1966 through 1969. He threw and batted right-handed and was listed as 5 feet 11 inches (1.80 m) tall and 170 pounds (77 kg).

Johnson did not establish himself as a big-league regular until he was almost 31 years old. He had trials with the Chicago Cubs (34 games played in 1960), Los Angeles Angels (only one appearance in 1961), and Milwaukee Braves (61 games in 1962). Only after he was summoned to the Los Angeles Dodgers from Triple-A Spokane, when the Dodgers lost regular outfielder Tommy Davis to a broken ankle on May 1, 1965, did Johnson earn a foothold in the major leagues. He became the Dodgers' regular left fielder during their 1965 world championship season, started over 60 games in both left and right fields in 1966 (during which the Dodgers captured their second straight National League pennant), and started another 85 games in the Dodger outfield in 1967.

He remained in the majors for two more years as a reserve player with to the Cubs, Cleveland Indians and California Angels. Later in life, he was employed by the Dodgers' Community Relations Department.

== Early life ==
Johnson was born on September 22, 1934, in Lexington, Kentucky, to Sidney Bell and Shirley Johnson. He had three brothers and one sister.

Johnson attended Dunbar High School in Lexington where he played both basketball and baseball. He wanted to play basketball at the University of Kentucky under coach Adolph Rupp. However, at the time, not only were members of the Southeastern Conference (of which Kentucky is an affiliate) not recruiting black athletes, most of its universities were segregated.

== Early baseball career ==
Johnson was signed by the New York Yankees as an amateur free agent in 1953. After moving around from team to team in the minor leagues for about eight years, he made his major league debut with the Chicago Cubs in 1960. The Cubs traded Johnson to the Los Angeles Angels for Jim McAnany on April 1, 1961. In 1962, he played in 61 games for the Milwaukee Braves. However, after that, the Braves traded Johnson to the Detroit Tigers system, which sent him back to the minor leagues for the 1963 and '64 seasons. Then they traded him to the Los Angeles Dodgers for the pitcher Larry Sherry.

== Los Angeles Dodgers ==
Johnson made it back to the major leagues to stay for a stretch beginning in 1965 with the Dodgers when a broken ankle in early May sidelined Tommy Davis, their regular left fielder, for the remainder of the season. Johnson filled in for Davis, playing in 130 games for the Dodgers that season, recording a .260 batting average, 57 runs scored, and 58 runs batted in (RBIs).

On September 9, 1965, Johnson also scored the only run for the Dodgers in Sandy Koufax's perfect game against the Chicago Cubs; he walked in the 5th, went to second base on a sacrifice bunt, stole third base, and then scored on a throwing error by Cubs' catcher Chris Krug. Johnson also doubled in the 7th, for the only hit off Cubs pitcher Bob Hendley, making Johnson the only player in MLB history to reach base for either team in a nine-inning game.

The Dodgers made it to the 1965 World Series versus the Minnesota Twins, and in this Series, Johnson had eight hits, including two home runs, the second one being the game-winning one in the decisive seventh game.

With Tommy Davis back in left field, and Willie Davis in center field, Johnson played mostly in right field in 1966. Frequently batting third in the order, right ahead of tough hitter Tommy Davis, Johnson set career highs by playing in 152 games, getting 526 at-bats, 143 hits, 17 home runs, scoring 71 runs, with 73 RBIs. Johnson's batting average that season was .272, and the Dodgers made it to the World Series once again.

This was also Koufax's last year in baseball before retiring due to severe arthritis and constant pain in his pitching arm that had plagued him for over three seasons. In the 1966 World Series against the Baltimore Orioles, the Dodgers' offense hit rock-bottom, with the team getting shut out three times, and only scoring two runs in the four games. Johnson finished the series with four hits in 15 at-bats and flew out to Paul Blair for the final out of the Series.

== Later baseball years ==
From this point on, Johnson's major league career rapidly wound down, as he broke his leg sliding into Joe Torre and played in just 104 games for the Dodgers in 1967, a combined 127 for the Chicago Cubs and the Cleveland Indians in 1968, and just 67 for the California Angels in 1969, with only a .203 batting average. He retired from baseball at the end of the 1969 season, at the age of 35.

In his approximately eight-year-long Major League career, Johnson posted a .258 overall average with 48 home runs and 232 RBI in 677 games played. Defensively, he recorded a .981 fielding percentage playing at all three outfield positions.

== Personal life ==
Johnson and his wife, Sarah, had three children: Lauren, Carlton, and Quinton. He died on October 1, 2020, after a period of ill-health. He was interred at Inglewood Park Cemetery.
