= Sandy Koufax =

American baseball player (born 1935)

- Publicity still of Koufax, c. 1965
- Pitcher
- Born: December 30, 1935 (age 90); Brooklyn, New York, U.S.
- Batted: Right Threw: Left

MLB debut
- June 24, 1955, for the Brooklyn Dodgers

Last MLB appearance
- October 2, 1966, for the Los Angeles Dodgers

MLB statistics
- Win–loss record: 165–87
- Earned run average: 2.76
- Strikeouts: 2,396
- Stats at Baseball Reference

Teams
- Brooklyn / Los Angeles Dodgers (1955–1966)

Career highlights and awards
- 7× All-Star (1961–1962, 1963–1966); 4× World Series champion (1955, 1959, 1963, 1965); NL MVP (1963); 3× Cy Young Award (1963, 1965, 1966); 2× World Series MVP (1963, 1965); 3× Triple Crown (1963, 1965, 1966); 3× MLB wins leader (1963, 1965, 1966); 5× NL ERA leader (1962–1966); 4× MLB strikeout leader (1961, 1963, 1965, 1966); Pitched a perfect game on September 9, 1965; Pitched four no-hitters; Los Angeles Dodgers No. 32 retired; Major League Baseball All-Century Team; Major League Baseball All-Time Team

Member of the National

Baseball Hall of Fame
- Induction: 1972
- Vote: 86.9% (first ballot)

Sanford Koufax (/ˈkoʊfæks/; né Braun; born December 30, 1935), nicknamed "the Left Arm of God", is an American former professional baseball player. Widely considered one of the greatest pitchers of all time, he played 12 seasons in Major League Baseball (MLB) for the Brooklyn / Los Angeles Dodgers from 1955 to 1966. Koufax was the first three-time winner of the Cy Young Award, each time winning unanimously and the only pitcher to do so when a single award was given for both leagues; he was also named the National League Most Valuable Player in 1963. Retiring at age 30 due to chronic pain in his pitching elbow, Koufax was elected to the Baseball Hall of Fame in 1972 at age 36, the youngest player ever elected.

Born in Brooklyn, New York, Koufax was primarily a basketball player in his youth and had pitched in only a few games before signing with the Brooklyn Dodgers at age 19. Due to the bonus rule he signed under, Koufax never pitched in the minor leagues. His lack of pitching experience caused manager Walter Alston to distrust Koufax, who saw inconsistent playing time during his first six seasons. After making adjustments prior to the 1961 season, Koufax quickly rose to become the dominant pitcher in the major leagues, as well as the first major sports star on the West Coast. He was an All-Star in each of his last six seasons, leading the National League (NL) in earned run average each of his last five years, in strikeouts four times, and in wins and shutouts three times each. He was the first pitcher in the live-ball era to post an earned run average below 2.00 in three different qualifying seasons and the first in the modern era to record a 300-strikeout season three times.

Koufax won the Major League Pitchers' Triple Crown three times, leading the Dodgers to a pennant in each of those years. He was the first major league pitcher to throw four no-hitters, including a perfect game in 1965. He was named the World Series MVP twice, leading the weak-hitting Dodgers to titles in 1963 and 1965. Despite his comparatively short career, his 2,396 career strikeouts ranked seventh in major league history at the time; his 40 shutouts were tied for ninth in modern NL history. He was the first pitcher in history to average more than nine strikeouts per nine innings pitched, and the first to allow fewer than seven hits per nine innings pitched. Koufax, along with teammate Don Drysdale, became a pivotal figure in baseball's labor movement when the two staged a joint holdout and demanded a fairer contract from the Dodgers before the 1966 season. Koufax is also considered one of the greatest Jewish athletes; his decision to sit out Game 1 of the 1965 World Series because it coincided with the Jewish holiday of Yom Kippur garnered national attention and made him a revered figure within the American Jewish community.

Since retiring, Koufax has kept a low profile and makes public appearances on rare occasions. In December 1966, he signed with NBC to work as a broadcaster; uncomfortable in front of cameras and with public speaking, he resigned after six years. In 1979, Koufax returned to work as a pitching coach in the Dodgers' farm system; he resigned from the position in 1990 but continues to make informal appearances during spring training. From 2013 to 2015, Koufax was special advisor to Dodgers chairman Mark Walter. In 1999, he was named to the Major League Baseball All-Century Team. His number 32 was retired by the Dodgers in 1972 and he was honored with a statue at Dodger Stadium in 2022.

== Early life ==
Koufax was born Sanford Braun to a Jewish family on December 30, 1935, in Borough Park, Brooklyn. His parents, Evelyn (née Lichtenstein) and Jack Braun, divorced when he was three years old. The son of a single working parent, he spent most of his childhood with his maternal grandparents and spent his summers at Camp Chi-Wan-Da, a Jewish summer camp in Ulster Park, New York, where his mother worked as a bookkeeper.

Evelyn, a certified public accountant, remarried when her son was nine to Irving Koufax, an attorney, whose name Sandy took. Koufax also gained a stepsister, Edith, Irving's daughter from a previous marriage. Shortly afterwards, the family moved to the Long Island suburb of Rockville Centre. They moved back to Brooklyn in June 1949, the day after Koufax graduated from ninth grade, settling in the neighborhood of Bensonhurst.

As a youth, Koufax was better known for basketball than for baseball. He had started playing it at the Edith and Carl Marks Jewish Community House of Bensonhurst, winning a few local titles with the community center team. Attending Lafayette High School, Koufax would become the basketball team's captain in his senior year. That year, he ranked second in his division in scoring, averaging 16.5 points per game. He made newspaper headlines for the first time when, during a preseason exhibition game between the Lafayette basketball team and the New York Knicks, he dunked twice and showed up Knicks star Harry Gallatin.

In 1951, Koufax joined a local youth baseball league known as the "Ice Cream League", playing for the Tomahawks. He started out as a left-handed catcher before moving to first base. He joined Lafayette's baseball team as a first baseman in his senior year at the urging of his friend Fred Wilpon. While with the high school team, he was spotted by Milt Laurie, a newspaper deliveryman and baseball coach who was the father of two Lafayette baseball players. Laurie noticed Koufax's strong throwing arm and recruited him to pitch for the Coney Island Sports League's Parkviews.

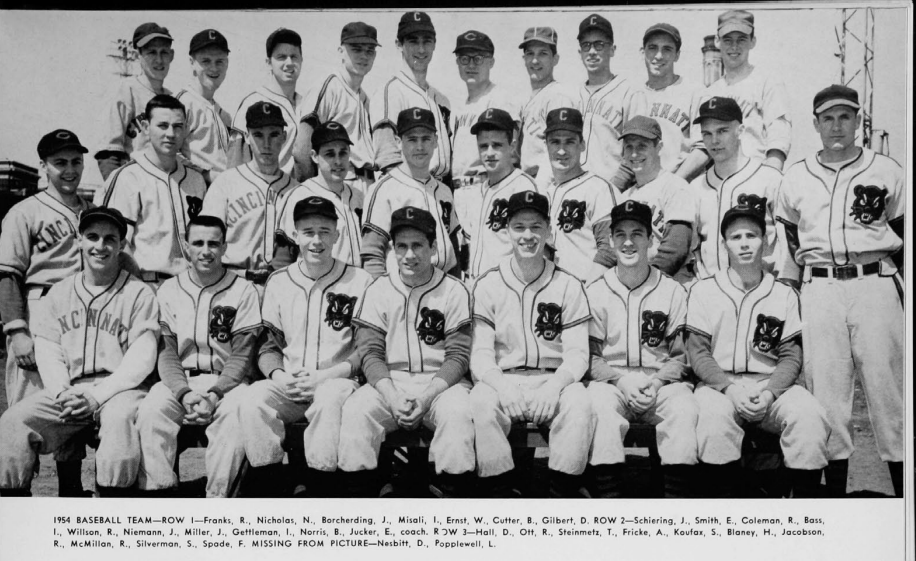
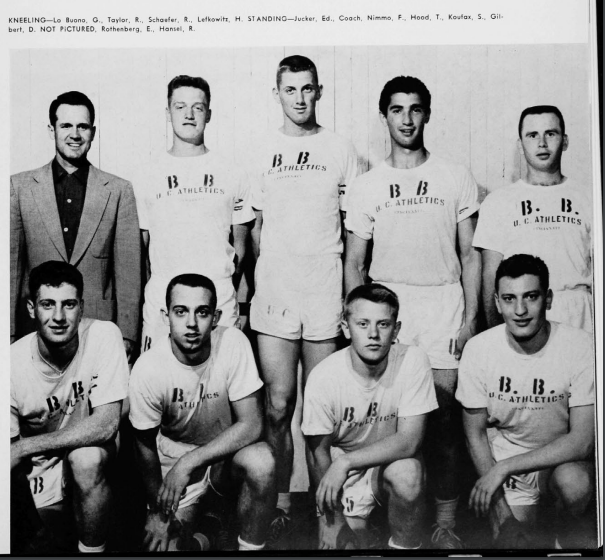
Koufax with the 1954 University of Cincinnati baseball team (left; top row, 5th from the left) and freshman basketball team (right; standing, 2nd from the right)

Koufax chose to attend the University of Cincinnati after becoming a walk-on for their freshman basketball team. Playing under coach Ed Jucker, he averaged 9.7 points per game. As a student, he was enrolled in a liberal arts major with the intention of transferring to the architectural school, and was a member of Pi Lambda Phi, a historically Jewish fraternity.

One day, Koufax overheard Jucker, who also coached the college baseball team, planning a last-minute road trip in his office which started in New Orleans. Eager to visit the city, he told Jucker, "I'm a pitcher" and made the team in a subsequent tryout. For the season, Koufax went 3–1 with a 2.81 earned run average, 51 strikeouts and 30 walks in 32 innings pitched.

=== Major League tryouts ===
While with the college baseball team, Koufax began to attract the attention of baseball scouts. Bill Zinser, a scout for the Brooklyn Dodgers, sent the team a glowing report that was seemingly filed away and forgotten. Gene Bonnibeau, a scout for the New York Giants, learned of Koufax through a Cincinnati newspaper and invited him to try out at the Polo Grounds after his freshman year. The workout did not go well for the nervous Koufax who threw wildly over the catcher's head; he never heard back from the Giants.

That summer, Koufax began pitching regularly for the Parkviews. In September, Ed McCarrick, a scout for the Pittsburgh Pirates, was highly impressed with Koufax after seeing him in a few sandlot games. At McCarrick's behest, Branch Rickey, general manager of the Pirates, sent scout Clyde Sukeforth to see Koufax. Sukeforth subsequently invited him to Forbes Field for a tryout before the Pirates' front office. Upon seeing Koufax pitch in person, Rickey remarked, "This is the greatest arm I've ever seen." The Pirates, however, failed to offer Koufax a contract until after he was already committed to the Dodgers.

Al Campanis, a Dodgers scout, heard about Koufax from sportswriter Jimmy Murphy of the Brooklyn Eagle who covered sandlot teams in Brooklyn and had seen him pitch a few times. He was also urged by Pat Auletta, the owner of a sporting goods store and founder of the Coney Island Sports League, to see Koufax pitch. Campanis arranged a tryout for him at Ebbets Field. With Dodgers manager Walter Alston and scouting director Fresco Thompson watching, Campanis assumed the hitter's stance while Koufax started throwing; he later said, "There are two times in my life the hair on my arms has stood up: The first time I saw the ceiling of the Sistine Chapel and the second time, I saw Sandy Koufax throw a fastball."

After the tryout, Koufax's father negotiated the contract with the Dodgers, asking for a bonus which would allow his son to finish college if his baseball career failed. They agreed on a $20,000 contract ($240,000 today) – $6,000 then-league minimum salary, with a $14,000 signing bonus – and not to officially sign until after the season ended, with Irving Koufax and owner Walter O'Malley making a handshake commitment.

Returning to university, Koufax also had a tryout with the Milwaukee Braves after which general manager John Quinn made him a $30,000 offer. Having already committed to signing with the Dodgers, Koufax turned down the Braves' offer. He also turned down a belated offer from the Pirates, promising him $5,000 more than what the Dodgers did. Koufax officially signed with his hometown team on December 14, 1954.

== Professional career ==
At the time of Koufax's signing, the bonus rule implemented by Major League Baseball was still in effect, stipulating that if a major league team signed a player to a contract with a signing bonus in excess of $4,000 ($58,000 today), they were required to keep them on their 25-man active roster for two full seasons. In compliance with the rule, the Dodgers placed Koufax on their major league roster. As it subsequently turned out, Koufax never played in the minor leagues.

=== Early years (1955–1960) ===
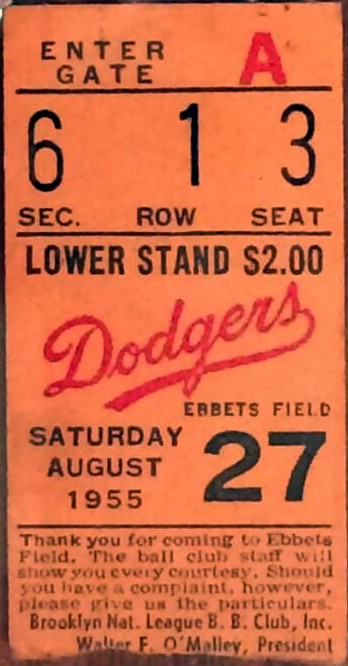
A ticket from the August 27, 1955, game between the Brooklyn Dodgers and the Cincinnati Redlegs, where Koufax earned his first career win

During his first spring training, Koufax struggled with his new training regime and suffered from a sore arm most of the time. Having pitched fewer than twenty games in the sandlots and college combined, he did not know a lot about pitching, such as how to properly field a ball, how to hold a runner on base, or even pitching signs, later saying, "The only signs I knew were one finger for fastball and two for a curve, and here there were five or six signs."

Having injured his ankle in the last week of spring training, Koufax was placed on the disabled list for 30 days; he would be activated by the Dodgers on June 8. To make room for him, they optioned their future Hall of Fame manager, Tommy Lasorda, to their Triple-A affiliate, the Montreal Royals. Lasorda would later joke that it took "one of the greatest left-handers in history" to keep him off the Dodgers major league roster.

Koufax made his major league debut on June 24, 1955, against the Milwaukee Braves, with the Dodgers trailing 7–1 in the fifth inning. Johnny Logan, the first batter Koufax faced, hit a bloop single. Eddie Mathews bunted back to the mound, and Koufax threw the ball into center field. He then walked Henry Aaron on four pitches to load the bases before striking out Bobby Thomson on a 3–2 fastball for his first career strikeout. Koufax ended up pitching two scoreless innings, inducing a double play to end the bases-loaded threat and picking up another strikeout in a perfect sixth.

Koufax's first start was on July 6, the second game of a doubleheader against the Pittsburgh Pirates. He lasted only 4.2 innings, giving up eight walks. He did not start again for almost two months.

On August 27, Koufax threw a two-hit, 7–0 complete game shutout against the Cincinnati Redlegs for his first major league win. He struck out 14 batters and allowed only two hits. His only other win in 1955 was also a shutout, a five-hitter against the Pirates on September 3.

In his rookie year, Koufax threw 41.2 innings in 12 appearances, striking out 30 batters and walking 28, with a record of 2–2 and 3.02 earned run average. The Dodgers went on to win the National League pennant and the 1955 World Series over the New York Yankees, the first title in franchise history; however, even though he was on the World Series roster, Koufax did not appear in the series. During the fall, he had enrolled in the Columbia University School of General Studies, which offered night classes in architecture; after the final out of Game 7, Koufax went straight to Columbia to attend class.

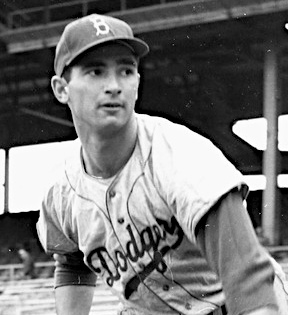
Koufax warming up at Wrigley Field, c. 1957

The 1956 season was not very different from 1955 for Koufax. Despite his blazing fastball, Koufax continued to struggle with control. He saw little work, pitching only 58.2 innings with a 4.91 earned run average, 29 walks and 30 strikeouts. When Koufax allowed baserunners, he was rarely permitted to finish the inning. Teammate Joe Pignatano remarked, years later, that as soon as Koufax threw a couple of balls in a row, Walter Alston would signal for a replacement to start warming up in the bullpen.

Notably, teammates Jackie Robinson and Roy Campanella both clashed with Alston on Koufax's usage, noting the young pitcher's talent and objecting to him being benched for weeks at a time. Pitcher Don Newcombe stated years later that Koufax faced antisemitism as a young pitcher from white players on the team who shunned him and used antisemitic slurs when referring to him. This led to black teammates rallying to Koufax's defense and supporting him during his early years.

To prepare him for the 1957 season, the Dodgers sent Koufax to Puerto Rico to play winter ball for the Criollos de Caguas. For the Criollos, Koufax compiled a record of 3–6 with a 4.35 earned run average and 76 strikeouts in 64.2 innings pitched. Two of his wins were shutouts, including a one-hitter and a two-hitter, with Roberto Clemente getting both hits against him in the latter, his last game in Puerto Rico before being released. Besides the Dodgers, the Criollos were the only other team Koufax pitched for in his career.

On May 15, the restriction on sending Koufax down to the minors was lifted. Alston gave him a chance to justify his place on the major league roster by giving him the next day's start. Facing the Chicago Cubs at Wrigley Field, Koufax struck out 13 while pitching his first complete game in almost two years. For the first time in his career, he was in the starting rotation, but only for two weeks. Despite winning three of his next five with a 2.90 earned run average, Koufax did not get another start for 45 days. In that start, he struck out 11 in seven innings, but got no decision. On September 29, he became the last man to pitch for the Brooklyn Dodgers before their move to Los Angeles, throwing an inning of relief in the final game of the season.

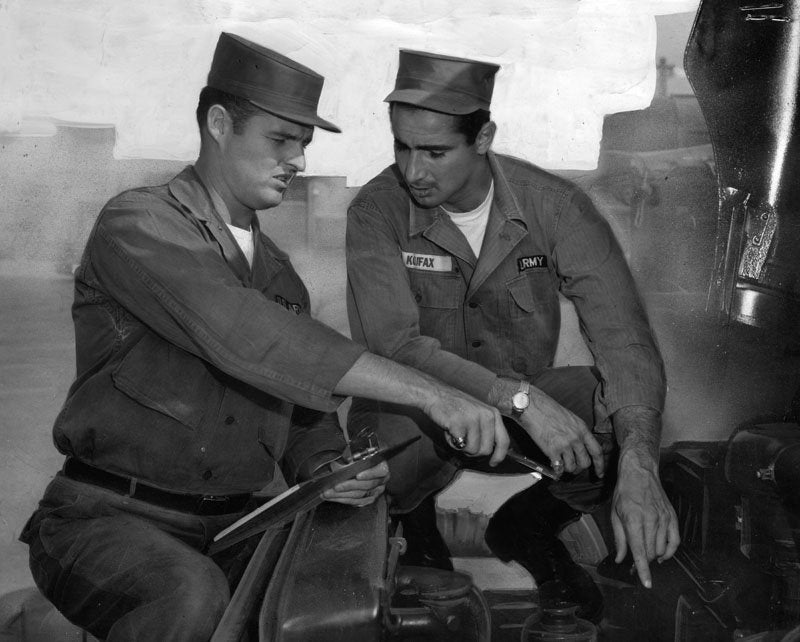
Koufax and teammate Don Drysdale changing parts on a military truck at the US Army Reserve Center in Van Nuys, California

Koufax, along with fellow Dodgers pitcher Don Drysdale, served in the United States Army Reserve for two years, from 1957 to 1959. He was often stationed at Fort Dix, New Jersey, during the offseason.

Koufax began the 1958 season 7–3, but sprained his ankle in a collision with Jim Bolger of the Chicago Cubs at first base on July 5, resulting in a long layoff. Throughout the season, he was also plagued with back pain, which was caused by a benign tumor on his rib cage, necessitating him to undergo surgery in the offseason to have the growth removed. As a result, he finished the season at 11–11 and leading the majors in wild pitches.

In 1959, on June 22, he set the record for a night game with 16 strikeouts against the Philadelphia Phillies. On August 31, against the San Francisco Giants, he broke Dizzy Dean's NL single-game record of 17 strikeouts and tied Bob Feller's Major League record of 18.

That season, the Dodgers won a tight pennant race against the Giants and the Milwaukee Braves. They faced the Chicago White Sox in the World Series. In his first World Series appearance, Koufax pitched two perfect relief innings in Game 1, though they came after the Dodgers were already behind 11–0. Alston gave Koufax the start in Game 5, at the Los Angeles Coliseum. In what would have been the series-clincher, Koufax allowed only one run in seven innings but lost the game 1–0 when Nellie Fox scored on a double play and the Dodgers failed to score a run in support. Returning to Chicago, the Dodgers won Game 6 and their first championship in Los Angeles.

In early 1960, Koufax asked Dodgers general manager Buzzie Bavasi to trade him because he believed he was not getting enough playing time, a request that was denied. On May 23, he pitched a one-hit shutout against the Pirates, allowing only a second-inning single by pitcher Bennie Daniels and striking out 10 batters in the process. However, the game was a highlight in an otherwise bad year for Koufax in which he went 8–13 with a 3.97 earned run average.

After the last game of the season, frustrated with his lack of progress and feeling resentment towards Dodger management, Koufax threw his equipment into the trash, having decided to quit baseball and devote himself to an electronics business in which he had invested. In his first six seasons, he had posted a record of 36–40 with a 4.10 earned run average. Nobe Kawano, the clubhouse supervisor, retrieved the equipment in case Koufax decided to return the following year.

=== Domination (1961–1964) ===
Koufax came to regret his decision to quit, having found working in the offseason boring. He decided to give baseball another try, remarking years later, "I decided I was really going to find out how good I can be." During the offseason, Koufax underwent tonsillectomy due to recurring throat issues and, as a result, reported to spring training thirty pounds under his normal playing weight. He later stated that it forced him to regain the lost muscle mass and weight through exercise and nutrition, allowing him to get into the "best shape" of his life. From then on, he made it a point to report to spring training under his playing weight.

During spring training, Dodger scout Kenny Myers discovered a hitch in Koufax's windup, where he would rear back so far he would lose sight of the target. As a result, Koufax tightened up his mechanics, believing that not only would it help better his control but would also help him disguise his pitches better. (Note: Throughout his career, Koufax fought a tendency to "tip" pitches which he never fully overcame; it was well known in the league when he would throw a fastball or a curve. Despite that, players such as Willie Mays and Joey Amalfitano believed that it made little difference as hitters "still couldn't hit him" due to the effectiveness of his pitches.) Additionally, Dodgers statistician Allan Roth helped Koufax tweak his game in the early 1960s, particularly regarding the importance of first-pitch strikes and the benefits of breaking pitches.

On March 23, Koufax was chosen to pitch in a B-squad game against the Minnesota Twins in Orlando, Florida, by teammate Gil Hodges who was acting manager for the day. As teammate Ed Palmquist had missed the flight, leaving the team short one pitcher, Hodges told Koufax he needed to pitch at least seven innings. Prior to the game, catcher Norm Sherry told him: "If you get behind the hitters, don't try to throw so hard." This was due to Koufax's tendency to lose his temper and throw hard and wildly whenever he got into trouble.

The strategy worked initially before Koufax temporarily reverted to throwing hard and walked the bases loaded with no out in the fifth. Sherry reminded Koufax of their discussion, advising him to settle down and throw to his glove; heeding the advice, Koufax struck out the side and finished the game with seven no-hit innings. He went on to have a strong spring training.

==== 1961 season ====
All the improvements and changes made in the offseason and during spring training resulted in 1961 becoming Koufax's breakout season. He posted an 18–13 record and led the majors with 269 strikeouts, breaking Christy Mathewson's 58-year-old NL mark of 267, and doing so in 110 innings fewer than Mathewson had.

That season also marked the first time in his career that Koufax started at least 30 games (35) and pitched at least 200 innings (255.2). He lowered his walks allowed per nine innings from 5.1 in 1960 to 3.4 in 1961, led the NL with a strikeout-to-walk ratio of 2.80, and led the majors with a fielding independent pitching mark (FIP) of 3.00.

On September 20, in the last regular season baseball game at the Coliseum, Koufax won a 13-inning contest against the Chicago Cubs for his 18th win of the year. He pitched a complete game, throwing 205 pitches, striking out fifteen batters.

==== 1962 season ====
In 1962, the Dodgers moved from the Los Angeles Coliseum – a football stadium which had a 250-foot (75 m) left-field line and a 40-foot (10 m) tall screen – to Dodger Stadium. The new park was pitcher-friendly, with a large foul territory and a relatively poor hitting background. Koufax, whose numbers were hurt by the peculiar dimensions of the Coliseum, was an immediate beneficiary of the move. (Note: Between 1958 and 1961, while the Dodgers were at the Coliseum, Koufax's home record was 17–23, with a 4.33 ERA and 56 home runs allowed while his road record was 28–20 with a 3.57 ERA and 33 home runs allowed.) Subsequently, he recorded what would be his first great season, leading the NL in ERA and the majors in hits per nine innings, strikeouts per nine innings, and FIP.

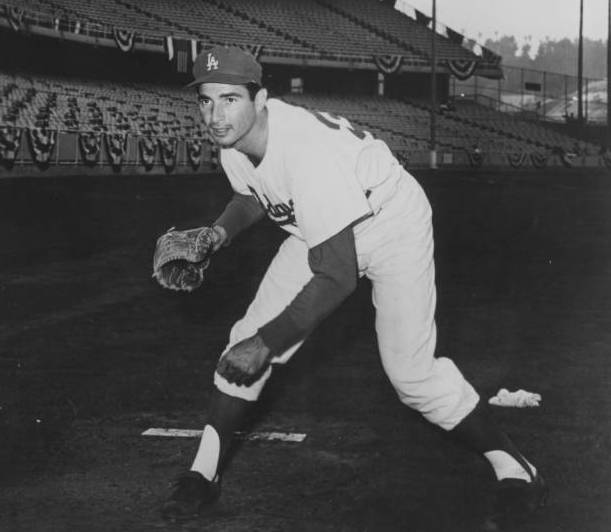
Koufax at Dodger Stadium, c. 1962

On April 24, Koufax tied his own record of 18 strikeouts in a 10–2 win over the Chicago Cubs in Wrigley Field. On June 13, against the Braves at Milwaukee County Stadium, he hit his first career home run off future Hall of Famer Warren Spahn, providing the winning margin in a 2–1 victory.

On June 30, Koufax threw his first career no-hitter against the expansion New York Mets; it was also the first Dodgers no-hitter since their move to Los Angeles. In the first inning, he threw an immaculate inning, becoming the sixth NL pitcher and the 11th overall to throw one; he remains the only one to do so in a no-hitter. His no-hitter, along with a 4–2 record, 73 strikeouts and a 1.23 ERA, earned him the Player of the Month Award for June. It was the only time in his career he earned this distinction.

Throughout the first half of the season, Koufax dealt with an injured pitching hand. In April, while at bat, he had been jammed by a pitch. A numbness soon developed in his left index finger and it slowly turned cold and pale. Due to his strong performance, Koufax ignored the condition, hoping it would clear up in due time. The condition worsened, however, with his whole hand turning numb by July. During a start against Cincinnati, his finger split open. A vascular specialist determined that Koufax had a crushed artery in his palm. Ten days of experimental medicine successfully reopened the artery, preventing the possibility of amputation.

Koufax was finally able to pitch again in September, when the team was locked in a tight pennant race with the Giants. However, after the long layoff, he was rusty and ineffective in three appearances and, by the end of the regular season and in part due to Koufax's absence from the Dodgers rotation, the Giants caught up with the Dodgers and forced a three-game playoff.

With an overworked pitching staff, manager Alston asked Koufax if he could start the first game. Koufax obliged but, still being rusty, was knocked out in the second inning, after giving up home runs to Willie Mays and Jim Davenport. After winning the second game of the series, the Dodgers blew a 4–2 lead in the ninth inning of the deciding third game, losing the pennant.

==== 1963 season ====
In 1963, Major League Baseball expanded the strike zone to combat what they perceived as too much offense. Compared to the previous season, walks in the NL fell 13%, strikeouts increased 6%, the league batting average fell from .261 to .245, and runs scored declined 15%. Koufax, who had reduced his walks allowed per nine innings to 3.4 in 1961 and 2.8 in 1962, reduced it further to 1.7 in 1963, which ranked fifth in the league.

On April 19, Koufax threw his second immaculate inning, this time in a two-hit shutout win against the Houston Colt .45s, becoming the first NL pitcher and the second pitcher ever (after Lefty Grove) to throw two immaculate innings. However, on April 23, he left a game against the Braves after throwing seven scoreless innings due to injuring the posterior capsule of his left shoulder. Koufax subsequently missed two weeks, returning on May 7 against the Cardinals.

Koufax threw his second career no-hitter against the San Francisco Giants on May 11, besting Giants ace Juan Marichal. He carried a perfect game into the eighth inning against the powerful Giants lineup which included future Hall of Famers Willie Mays, Willie McCovey, and Orlando Cepeda. The perfect game ended when he walked catcher Ed Bailey on a full count. Koufax closed out the game after walking pinch-hitter McCovey on four pitches with two out in the ninth.

From July 3 to 16, Koufax pitched 33 consecutive scoreless innings, pitching three shutouts to lower his earned run average to 1.65. On July 20, he hit the second and last home run of his career, coincidentally again in Milwaukee; he hit a three-run shot off Braves pitcher Denny Lemaster to propel the team to a 5–4 win; it was his only game with three runs batted in.

In 1963, Koufax won the first of three pitching Triple Crowns, leading the majors in wins (25), strikeouts (306), and earned run average (1.88). He threw 11 shutouts, eclipsing Carl Hubbell's 30-year, post-1900 mark for a left-handed pitcher of 10 and setting a record that stands to this day. Only Bob Gibson, with 13 shutouts in his iconic 1968 season (known as "the year of the pitcher"), has thrown more since.

Koufax won the National League Most Valuable Player Award, and was the first unanimous selection for the Cy Young Award, winning at a time when only one was awarded for both leagues. (Note: Separate Cy Young Awards for each league started being awarded in 1967, the year after Koufax retired.) He was also named the Associated Press Male Athlete of the Year for the first time, and was awarded the Hickok Belt as the athlete of the year.

Clinching the pennant on September 27, the Dodgers faced the heavily favored New York Yankees in the 1963 World Series. In Game 1, Koufax beat Whitey Ford 5–2. He struck out the first five batters and 15 overall, breaking Carl Erskine's decade-old record of 14. The Dodgers won Games 2 and 3 behind the pitching of Johnny Podres, Ron Perranoski, and Don Drysdale. Koufax completed the Dodgers' series sweep in Game 4 with a 2–1 victory over Ford; the only run he allowed was a home run by Mickey Mantle.

During the series, Koufax struck out 23 batters in 18 innings, a record for a four-game World Series, and had a 2–0 record with an earned run average of 1.50; for his performance, he was awarded the World Series Most Valuable Player Award.

=== Salary dispute ===
After his successful 1963 season, Koufax asked the Dodgers for a salary raise to $75,000, later writing in his autobiography: "I felt I was entitled to a healthy raise. Like double of the $35,000 I had received the year before, plus another $5,000 for good measure, good conduct, and good luck. They could hardly say I didn't deserve it." However, during his meeting with Dodgers general manager Buzzie Bavasi, the latter stated Koufax had not earned such a big raise, using numerous excuses to justify his stance, including that he had not pitched enough innings the year before. Bavasi instead offered him $65,000.

Angered at Bavasi's reasoning, Koufax held his ground. After tense negotiations, the pair finally agreed to $70,000 and Koufax signed just before the team was about to leave for spring training. Soon after his signing, however, the Los Angeles Herald-Examiner published a story which incorrectly stated that Koufax had threatened to retire if he did not get a salary of $90,000. Shocked and angry that the story painted him as greedy, Koufax responded in an interview with Frank Finch of the Los Angeles Times that he did neither of those things, saying: "I've been hurt by people I thought were my friends."

The story continued into spring training, with the usually quiet and reserved Koufax telling his side of the negotiations to sportswriters. He strongly suspected that somebody in the front office leaked the story. Koufax dropped the matter only after both Bavasi and Dodgers owner Walter O'Malley met with him separately. However, due to the bitter negotiations and what he felt was disrespect from the front office, Koufax's relationship with both men never fully recovered.

==== 1964 season ====
On April 14, Koufax made the only Opening Day start of his career, pitching a 4–0 shutout against the St. Louis Cardinals. In his next start, he struck out three batters on nine pitches in the third inning of a 3–0 loss to the Cincinnati Reds, becoming the first pitcher in Major League history to throw three immaculate innings. On April 22 in St. Louis, however, Koufax "felt something let go" in his arm during the first inning, resulting in three cortisone shots in his left elbow and three missed starts.

On June 4, against the Philadelphia Phillies in Connie Mack Stadium, Koufax threw his third career no-hitter, tying Bob Feller as the only modern-era pitchers to hurl three no-hitters. He needed just 97 pitches and faced the minimum 27 batters while striking out 12. The only full-count he allowed was to Dick Allen in the fourth inning. Allen walked and was thrown out trying to steal second base; he was the Phillies' only baserunner that day.

On August 8, during a game against the Milwaukee Braves, Koufax jammed his pitching elbow while diving back to second base to beat a pick-off throw by Tony Cloninger. He managed to pitch and win two more games, but on the morning after his 19th win, a shutout in which he struck out 13 batters, Koufax woke up to find his elbow "as big as his knee" and that he could no longer straighten his arm. He was diagnosed by Dodgers team physician Robert Kerlan with traumatic arthritis. (Note: Dr. Frank Jobe, inventor of the Tommy John surgery, later disagreed with Koufax's diagnosis. He believed that Koufax suffered a torn ulnar collateral ligament but stated there were no means to diagnose or treat such an injury when Koufax was an active player.) With the Dodgers out of the pennant race, Koufax did not pitch again that season, finishing with a 19–5 win-loss record and leading the National League with a 1.74 ERA and seven shutouts, and the majors with a 2.08 FIP.

=== Playing in pain (1965–1966) ===
After resting during the off-season, Koufax returned to spring training in 1965 and initially had no problems from pitching. On March 30, however, he woke up the morning after pitching a complete game against the Chicago White Sox to find his entire left arm swollen and black and blue from hemorrhaging. He returned to Los Angeles to consult with Kerlan who warned him that he would eventually lose the full use of his arm if he continued to pitch.

Kerlan and Koufax established a schedule which he followed for the last two seasons of his career. Koufax initially agreed to stop throwing between starts but, as it had been a part of his routine for a long time, he soon resumed it. Instead, he stopped throwing sidearm pitches (which he often did against left-handed batters) and removed his rarely-used slider from his repertoire.

Before each start, Koufax had capsaicin-based Capsolin ointment – nicknamed the "Atomic Balm" by players – rubbed onto his shoulder and arm. Afterwards, he soaked his arm in a tub of ice to prevent swelling; during the ice treatments, he often wore a rubber sleeve fashioned from an inner tube to prevent frostbite. If his elbow swelled up after a game, the fluid would be drained with a syringe. When necessary, he was also given a cortisone shot in the elbow joint. For the pain, Koufax took Empirin with codeine every night and occasionally during a game. He also took Butazolidin, a drug used to treat inflammation caused by arthritis which was eventually taken off the market due to its toxic side effects.

==== 1965 season ====
Despite the constant pain in his pitching elbow, Koufax pitched a major league-leading 335.2 innings and 27 complete games, leading the Dodgers to another pennant. He won his second pitching Triple Crown, leading the Majors in wins (26), earned run average (2.04), and strikeouts (382). Koufax captured his second unanimous Cy Young Award, and was runner-up for the National League MVP Award, behind Willie Mays.

Koufax's 382 strikeouts broke Rube Waddell's modern record of 349 strikeouts in 1904, and was the highest modern-day total at the time. He walked only 71 batters, the first time a pitcher struck out 300 more batters than he walked (311). Additionally, he held batters to 5.79 hits per nine innings, and allowed the fewest baserunners per nine innings in any season ever: 7.83, breaking his own record (set two years earlier) of 7.96.

Koufax was the pitcher for the Dodgers during the game on August 22, when Giants pitcher Juan Marichal clubbed Dodgers catcher John Roseboro in the head with a bat. The game, which came in the middle of a heated pennant race, had been tense since it began, with Marichal brushing back Dodgers outfielder Ron Fairly and shortstop Maury Wills, and Koufax retaliating by throwing over the head of Willie Mays. After Koufax's retaliation, both benches were warned by umpire Shag Crawford; despite this, he asked Roseboro, "Who do you want me to get?" Not wanting Koufax ejected in the middle of a crucial game, Roseboro replied, "I'll handle it."

After the clubbing occurred, Koufax rushed from the mound and attempted to grab the bat from Marichal. A fourteen-minute brawl ensued in which he and Mays attempted to restore peace, with Mays dragging the injured Roseboro away from the fight. After the game resumed, a shaken Koufax walked two batters before giving up a three-run home run to Mays. While he eventually settled down and pitched a complete game without allowing more runs, the Dodgers lost the game 4–3.

===== Perfection =====
On September 9, 1965, Koufax became the sixth pitcher of the modern era, and eighth overall, to throw a perfect game. The game, pitched against the Chicago Cubs, was Koufax's fourth no-hitter, setting a then-major league record, and the first by a left-hander in the modern era. He struck out 14 batters, the most recorded in a perfect game, and at least one batter in each inning in the 1–0 win.

The game also set a record for the fewest hits in a major league contest as Cubs pitcher Bob Hendley pitched a one-hitter and allowed only two batters to reach base. Both pitchers had no-hitters intact until the seventh inning. The winning run was unearned, scored in the fifth inning without a hit when Dodgers left fielder Lou Johnson walked, reached second on a sacrifice, stole third, and scored on a throwing error by Cubs catcher Chris Krug. The only hit was a bloop double by Johnson to shallow right in the seventh inning.

===== World Series and Yom Kippur decision =====
The Dodgers won the NL pennant on the second-to-last game of the season, against the Milwaukee Braves. Koufax started the game on two days' rest and pitched a complete game 3–1 win, striking out 13, to clinch the pennant for the Dodgers. (Note: In his career, Koufax pitched in nine games on two days' rest, starting eight times. He never lasted less than seven innings, winning seven of those games and pitching a complete game six times.)

Koufax garnered national attention when he declined to start Game 1 of the 1965 World Series as it clashed with Yom Kippur, the holiest day in the Jewish calendar. Instead, Drysdale pitched the opener, but was hit hard by the Minnesota Twins. When Dodgers manager Walter Alston came out to remove Drysdale from the game, the latter quipped: "I bet right now you wish I was Jewish, too."

In Game 2, Koufax pitched six innings, giving up two runs (one unearned); the Twins won 5–1 to take an early 2–0 lead in the series. The Dodgers fought back in Games 3 and 4, with wins by Claude Osteen and Drysdale. With the Series tied at 2–2, Koufax pitched a four-hit shutout in Game 5, striking out 10 batters, for a 3–2 Dodgers lead.

The Series returned to Metropolitan Stadium for Game 6, which the Twins' Jim Grant won to force a seventh, decisive game. For the series clincher, Alston decided to start Koufax on two days' rest over the fully-rested Drysdale against the Twins' Jim Kaat. Pitching through fatigue and chronic pain, he threw a three-hit shutout with 10 strikeouts, despite the fact he did not have his curveball and relied almost entirely on his fastball.

For his performance, Koufax won the World Series MVP Award, the first player to be awarded it multiple times. Koufax also won the Hickok Belt for a second time, also the first time anyone won the belt more than once. That year, he was named the Sportsman of the Year by Sports Illustrated and Associated Press Male Athlete of the Year for a second time.

=== Holdout ===
In the offseason, prior to the 1966 season, Koufax and Drysdale met separately with general manager Buzzie Bavasi to negotiate their contracts for the upcoming season. Koufax still harbored ill feelings towards Bavasi stemming from his contract dispute before the 1964 season. After his meeting, he met Drysdale and his wife Ginger for dinner, irritated that Bavasi was using his own teammate against him in the salary negotiations. Drysdale responded that Bavasi had done the same thing with him. After comparing notes, they realized that Bavasi had played each pitcher against the other.

Ginger Drysdale, who had worked as a model and actress and was once a member of the Screen Actors Guild, suggested the pair negotiate together to get what they wanted. Hence, in January 1966, Koufax and Drysdale informed the Dodgers of their decision to hold out together.

In a highly unusual move for the time, they were represented by entertainment lawyer J. William Hayes, Koufax's business manager. Also unusual was their demand of $1 million ($9.9 million today), divided equally over the next three years, or $167,000 ($1.66 million today) each for each of the next three seasons. They told Bavasi they would negotiate their contracts as one unit through their agent. The Dodgers refused to do so, stating it was against their policy, and a stalemate ensued. The front office began to wage a public relations campaign against the pair.

Koufax and Drysdale did not report to spring training in February 1966. Instead, both signed to appear in the movie Warning Shot. Additionally, Koufax had signed a book deal to write his autobiography, Koufax, with author Ed Linn. Meanwhile, Hayes unearthed a state law, the result of the De Havilland v. Warner Bros. Pictures case, that made it illegal to extend personal service contracts in California beyond seven years; he began to prepare a lawsuit to challenge the reserve clause. When Dodgers owner Walter O'Malley found out about this, the team's front office softened its stance towards the pair.

Actor and former baseball player Chuck Connors helped arrange a meeting between Bavasi and the two pitchers. Koufax gave Drysdale the go-ahead to negotiate new deals on behalf of both of them. At the end of the thirty-two day holdout, Koufax signed for $125,000 ($1.24 million today) and Drysdale for $110,000 ($1.09 million today). The deal made Koufax the highest paid player in Major League Baseball for 1966.

The holdout was the first significant event in baseball's labor movement and the first time major league players challenged the absolute stronghold the owners held in baseball at the time. That same year, trade unionist Marvin Miller used the Koufax–Drysdale holdout as an argument for collective bargaining while campaigning for players' votes during spring training; he would soon be elected by the players as first executive director of the Major League Baseball Players Association.

==== 1966 season ====
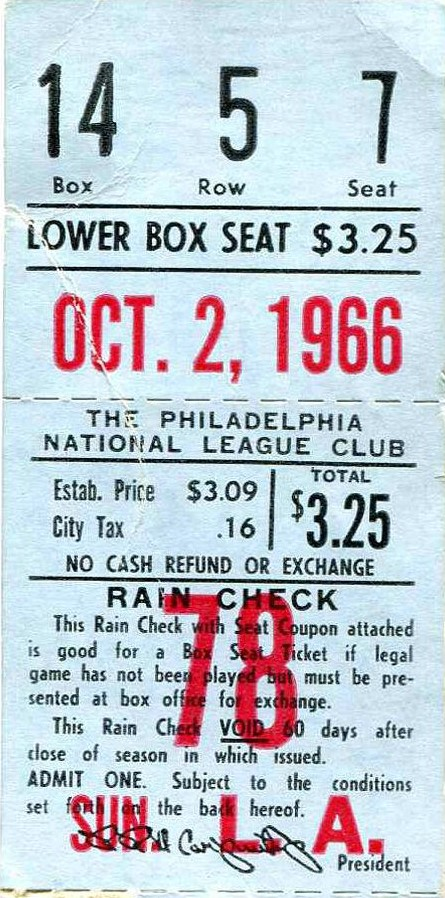
A ticket from the October 2, 1966, game between the Los Angeles Dodgers and the Philadelphia Phillies, where Koufax earned his final career win

In April 1966, Kerlan told Koufax it was time to retire and that his arm could not take another season. By this time, Koufax could no longer straighten his arm and it occasionally went numb, causing him to drop anything he was holding. Koufax kept Kerlan's advice to himself, having decided the year before to make 1966 his last season. He went out to pitch every fourth day, accumulating 323 innings and not missing a start.

He posted a 27–9 win-loss record, with 317 strikeouts and a 1.73 earned run average, and won his third pitching Triple Crown. Koufax won his third unanimous Cy Young Award, the first pitcher ever to win three, and was again runner-up for the National League MVP Award, finishing behind Roberto Clemente of the Pirates. (Note: While Koufax received more first place votes than Clemente did in the 1966 MVP race, the latter had a higher vote share, edging out Koufax by 78% to 74%.)

On September 25, the day after Yom Kippur, Koufax matched up with Ken Holtzman of the Chicago Cubs, a fellow Jewish southpaw. At Wrigley Field, Koufax allowed only two runs (one unearned), both in the first inning, but lost by a 2–1 score. Holtzman carried a no-hitter into the 9th, allowing only one run and two hits. It was Koufax's last regular season loss.

In the final game of the regular season, the Dodgers had to beat the Phillies to win the pennant. In the second game of a doubleheader, Koufax faced Jim Bunning for the second time that season. On two days' rest, Koufax pitched a 6–3 complete-game victory to clinch the pennant, the final win of his career.

During the fifth inning, Koufax injured his back while pitching to Gary Sutherland who was pinch-hitting for Bunning. After the inning, he went to the trainer's room where the injury was diagnosed as a slipped disc. Dodger trainers Bill Buehler and Wayne Anderson applied Capsolin on his back and, along with former Dodger Don Newcombe, pulled Koufax in opposite directions until the disc slipped back into place.

The Dodgers went on to face the Baltimore Orioles in the 1966 World Series. As Koufax had pitched the pennant clincher just three days earlier, Walter Alston was reluctant to start him in Game 1 for what would have been two consecutive starts on two days' rest. Instead, Drysdale started in Koufax's place; he proved to be ineffective, however, recording only six outs and losing 5–2.

In Game 2, his third start in eight days, Koufax shut out the Orioles for the first four innings. However, three errors by Dodgers centerfielder Willie Davis in the fifth inning produced three unearned runs. The only earned run allowed by Koufax was the result of Davis losing a fly ball hit by Frank Robinson which fell for a triple; Robinson subsequently scored on a single by Boog Powell. Koufax did not receive any run support either; Baltimore's 20-year-old future Hall of Famer Jim Palmer pitched a four-hit shutout, and the Orioles won 6–0.

Alston lifted Koufax at the end of the sixth inning with the idea of getting him extra rest before a potential fifth game. Instead, the Dodgers were swept in four games. Claude Osteen and Drysdale both lost by a score of 1–0 in Games 3 and 4 respectively, with the offense failing to score a single run after having scored just two in Game 1.

=== Retirement ===
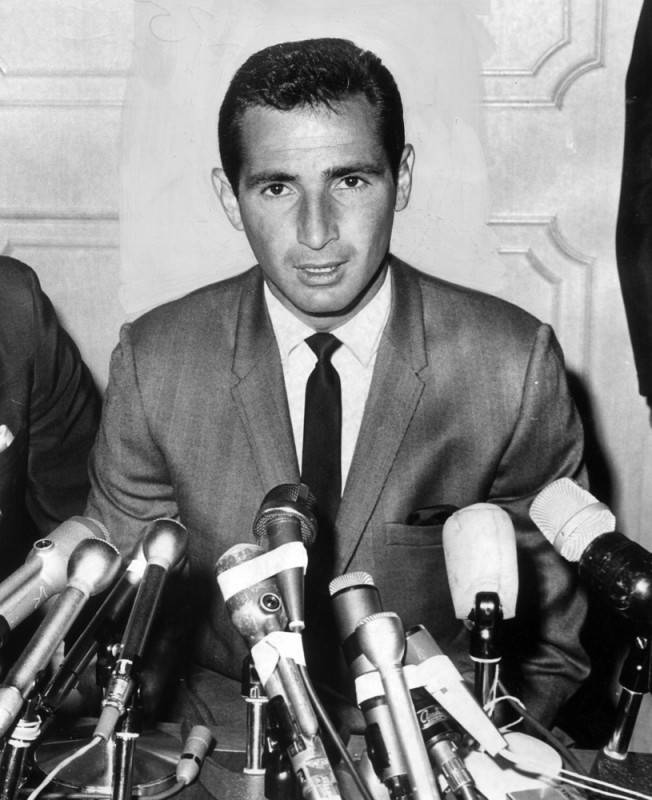
Koufax announces his retirement, November 1966

On November 18, 1966, Koufax announced his retirement from baseball in a press conference at the Beverly Wilshire Hotel. He cited the treatments that were required to make it possible for him to pitch regularly and the possibility of losing the use of his arm as the reasons for retiring at age 30:

I've got a lot of years to live after baseball and I would like to live them with the complete use of my body. I don't regret one minute of the last twelve years, but I think I would regret one year that was too many.

With the Dodgers touring Japan at the time, nobody from the team's front office was present at the press conference. Koufax, who told Buzzie Bavasi of his decision a few days before the conference, refused his request to delay his retirement until after the winter meetings in order to facilitate a few deals in the Dodgers' favor or to wait until owner Walter O'Malley returned from Japan, having already once delayed it and feeling he was being deceitful to sportswriters asking him about his future plans. In turn, Bavasi refused to attend the conference.

The announcement of his retirement came as a shock, particularly to his teammates. Soon afterwards, Koufax told an incredulous Dick Tracewski, his old Dodger roommate, that he could have continued to pitch but would have risked disability if he did so: "My arm still hurts. I can't go on doing this medication thing and pitching. It's going to kill me... Lots of bad things could happen. I just gotta retire." Years later, Koufax stated that he never regretted retiring when he did but did regret having to make the decision to retire.

Koufax's retirement ended a five-year run in which he went 111–34 with a 1.95 earned run average and 1,444 strikeouts. During that run, he led the Dodgers to three National League pennants and two World Series titles, in both of which he was named the series MVP. He won Cy Young Awards in each of the pennant-winning years and also won the NL Most Valuable Player Award in 1963. During this period, he was named Sports Illustrated Sportsman of the Year in 1965, and The Sporting News named him as MLB Player of the Year in 1963 and 1965, and NL Pitcher of the Year for four consecutive seasons, from 1963 to 1966.

== Career overall ==
=== Statistics and achievements ===
In his 12-season major league career, Koufax had a 165–87 record with a 2.76 earned run average, 2,396 strikeouts, 137 complete games, and 40 shutouts. He was the first pitcher to average fewer than seven hits allowed per nine innings pitched (6.79) and to strike out more than nine batters (9.28) per nine innings pitched, retiring with more career strikeouts than innings pitched. For the 1960s, he had the lowest ERA (2.36) and lowest WHIP (1.005) of any pitcher with at least 1,200 innings pitched and the third-most strikeouts in the decade (1,910) despite not pitching after 1966.

Koufax was the first pitcher to win three Cy Young Awards, an especially impressive feat as it was during the era when only one was given out for both major leagues. He was also the first pitcher to win the award by a unanimous vote, a distinction which he received twice more.

He became the first pitcher in baseball history to have two games with 18 or more strikeouts, and the first to have eight games with at least 15 strikeouts (now fourth-most all-time). He also set a then-record of 97 games with at least 10 strikeouts (now sixth-most all-time). In his last ten seasons, from 1957 to 1966, batters hit .203 against him, with a .271 on-base percentage and a .315 slugging average. His run of five consecutive ERA titles is a Major League record. He also led the majors in WHIP four consecutive times and FIP six consecutive times, both also records.

Since the start of the live-ball era, Koufax is one of only nine pitchers to record multiple 10+ WAR seasons. He is also the only one to record an ERA under 1.90 in three different qualifying seasons. In each of his last ten seasons, from 1957 to 1966, Koufax finished top ten in strikeouts, including top three finishes in seven; this was despite him being a part-time starter in three of those seasons and suffering a season-shortening injury in two. From 1961 to 1966, he recorded six consecutive 200-strikeout seasons.

Koufax is considered one of the greatest big game pitchers in baseball history. Sabermetrician Bill James described Koufax as having a bigger impact on pennant races than any other pitcher in the 20th and 21st centuries, and though his record across four World Series is 4–3, his 0.95 ERA and two World Series MVP Awards testify to how well he actually pitched. In his three losses, Koufax only gave up one earned run in each; the Dodgers scored only one run in support across the three games, getting shut out twice. His 22 consecutive World Series scoreless innings streak is the fourth-longest in World Series history and ninth-longest in postseason history.

He was selected as an All-Star for six consecutive seasons and made seven out of eight possible All-Star Game appearances those seasons. (Note: Major League Baseball held two All-Star Games for the years from 1959 to 1962.) Koufax pitched six innings across four All-Star games; he was the winning pitcher in the 1965 All-Star Game, and was the starting pitcher in the 1966 All-Star Game, throwing three innings of one-run ball on two days' rest.

| Category | W | L | ERA | G | GS | CG | SHO | SV | IP | H | R | ER | HR | BB | IBB | SO | HBP | ERA+ | FIP | WHIP | H9 | SO9 | Ref. |
|---|---|---|---|---|---|---|---|---|---|---|---|---|---|---|---|---|---|---|---|---|---|---|---|
| Total | 165 | 87 | 2.76 | 397 | 314 | 137 | 40 | 9 | 2,324.1 | 1,754 | 806 | 713 | 204 | 817 | 48 | 2,396 | 18 | 131 | 2.69 | 1.106 | 6.8 | 9.3 | |

=== Pitching style and repertoire ===
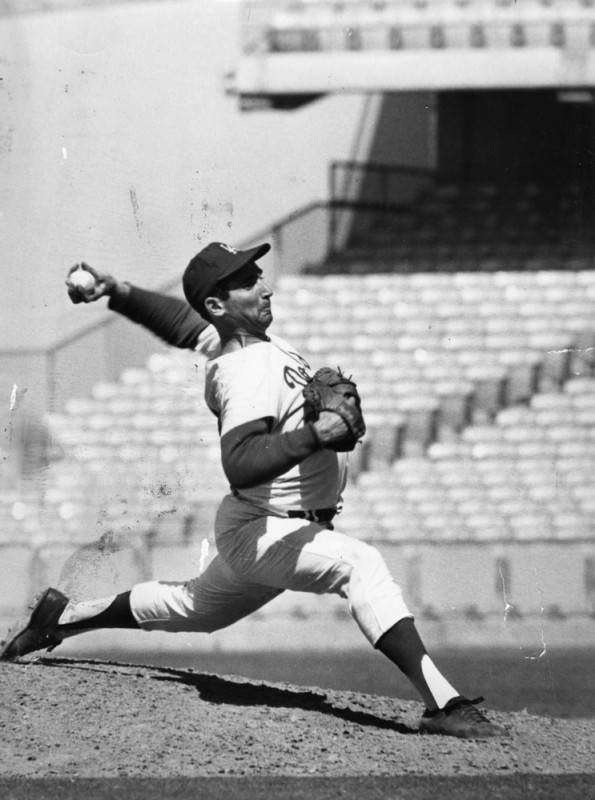
Koufax striding towards home plate

Koufax was a power pitcher and threw with a pronounced straight-over-the-top arm action. Most of his velocity came from his strong legs and back, combined with a high leg kick during his wind-up and long forward extension on his release point toward home plate. His unusually large hands also allowed him to put heavy spin on his pitches and control the direction in which they would break.

Reserved and shy by nature, Koufax was a fierce competitor on the mound. He once pushed back on his "gentle competitor" image, saying: "It sure as hell isn't 'gentle', especially playing the game." Though not a headhunter like teammate Don Drysdale, contrary to belief, he did not hesitate to pitch inside or brush back an opponent, once remarking: "The art of pitching is instilling fear."

Throughout his career, Koufax relied heavily on two pitches. His four-seam fastball gave batters the impression of rising as it approached them, due to heavy backspin he created by pulling on the seams. His overhand curveball, spun with the middle finger, dropped vertically 12 to 24 inches due to his arm action; it is considered by many as being the best curve of all time.

Though he had a changeup, Koufax almost never threw it, eventually replacing it with a forkball which he used more regularly as a third pitch. Shortstop Roy McMillan described its movement as being not unlike that of a spitball. In his final seasons, Koufax also began throwing a cutter to compensate for drop in velocity.

== Post-playing activities ==
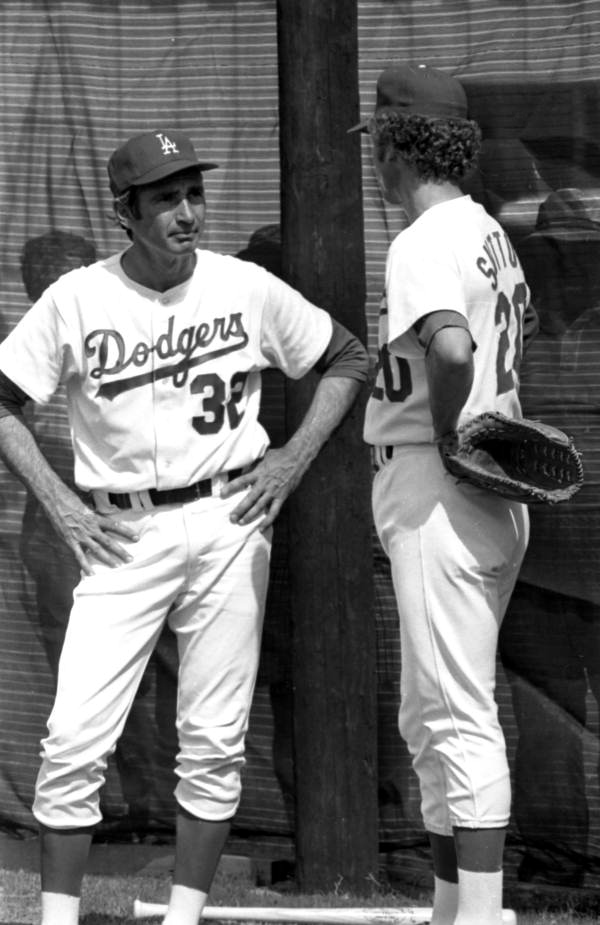
Koufax (left) as a pitching coach for the Dodgers during spring training, c. 1979

Soon after his retirement, Koufax signed a 10-year contract with NBC for $1 million ($9.7 million today) to be a broadcaster on the Saturday Game of the Week. During his tenure, he also served as the color commentator for the All-Star Game and as a pre-game analyst for the World Series.

A shy man, Koufax was never comfortable on the air; he had difficulty talking baseball with people who had not played the game professionally. It was also challenging for him to describe pitchers whose repertoires and style of pitching differed from his, and to be critical of players he had played with and against. As a result, he quit after six years and his contract with NBC was terminated by mutual consent before the 1973 season.

In 1979, Koufax was hired by the Dodgers as a minor league pitching coach in their farm system. During his tenure, he worked with a number of pitchers, including Orel Hershiser, Dave Stewart, John Franco, Bob Welch, and fellow Hall of Famers Don Sutton and Pedro Martínez. Koufax, with the help of former teammate Roger Craig, taught himself how to throw a split-finger fastball, a popular pitch in the 1980s, in order to be able to teach it to pitchers in the Dodgers' minor league system.

He resigned from his position in 1990, saying he was not earning his keep as the Dodgers had cut back his workload; most observers, however, blamed it on his uneasy relationship with manager Tommy Lasorda who reportedly resented Koufax working with his pitchers. Despite this, Koufax continued to make informal visits to spring training.

During this time, Koufax also began to make spring training visits with other teams, particularly with the New York Mets who were then owned by his childhood friend Fred Wilpon. Notably, Mets pitcher Al Leiter credited Koufax for helping him become a better pitcher.

In 2002, the New York Post published a false story about Koufax in connection to a biography on him by sportswriter Jane Leavy, titled Sandy Koufax: A Lefty's Legacy, insinuating that he only agreed to cooperate because Leavy threatened to out him as gay if he did not. The Post retracted the story after Leavy denied there was such a deal, calling it "thoroughly erroneous on all counts." Koufax cut ties with the Dodgers as both the team and the newspaper were, at the time, owned by Rupert Murdoch's News Corp and he did not want to help promote any of their subsidiaries. He reconnected with the organization in 2004, when the News Corp sold the Dodgers to Frank McCourt.

Prior to the 2013 season, the Dodgers again hired Koufax, this time in a front office role as a special advisor to team chairman Mark Walter, to work with pitchers during spring training at Camelback Ranch and consult during the season. During one spring training visit in 2014, Koufax was hit on the head by a stray line drive, resulting in a cut on his head. He underwent a precautionary CT scan and returned to the spot where he had been hit the following day. Koufax retired from the front office role prior to the 2016 season.

Since its founding, Koufax has been closely involved with the activities of the Baseball Assistance Team (B.A.T.), a non-profit organization dedicated to helping former baseball players through financial and medical difficulties. He has served as a member of its advisory board, and has been a regular attendee at the annual B.A.T. dinner. He also serves on the board of directors for the Hole in the Wall Gang Camp, a non-profit organization and summer camp for children with disabilities and chronic illnesses; he joined the charity in 2008 after visiting his grandniece Erin, who was volunteering there, and reportedly being moved and overwhelmed by the camp's work.

== Honors and recognition ==
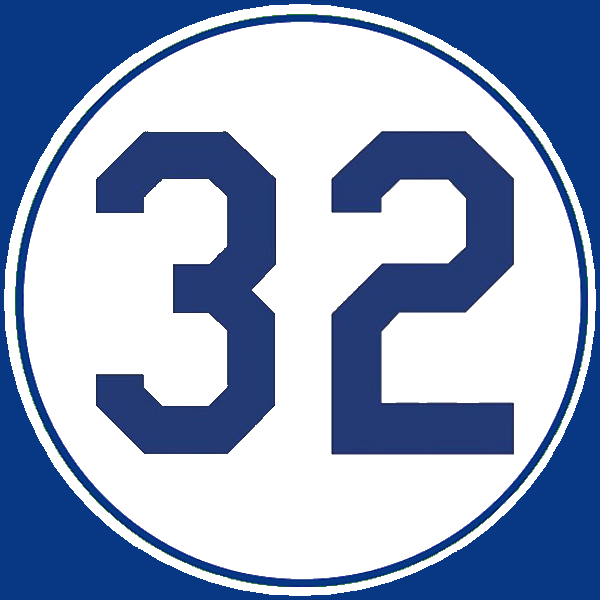
Sandy Koufax's number 32 was retired by the Los Angeles Dodgers in 1972.

Koufax was elected to the Baseball Hall of Fame in 1972, his first year of eligibility. At 36 years and 20 days old, he became the youngest person ever elected, five months younger than Lou Gehrig was at the time of his special election in December 1939. (Note: In 2022, Koufax became the first person to mark the 50th anniversary of their election to the Baseball Hall of Fame.) He was also the second Jewish player elected to the Hall of Fame, after Hank Greenberg who was elected in 1956.

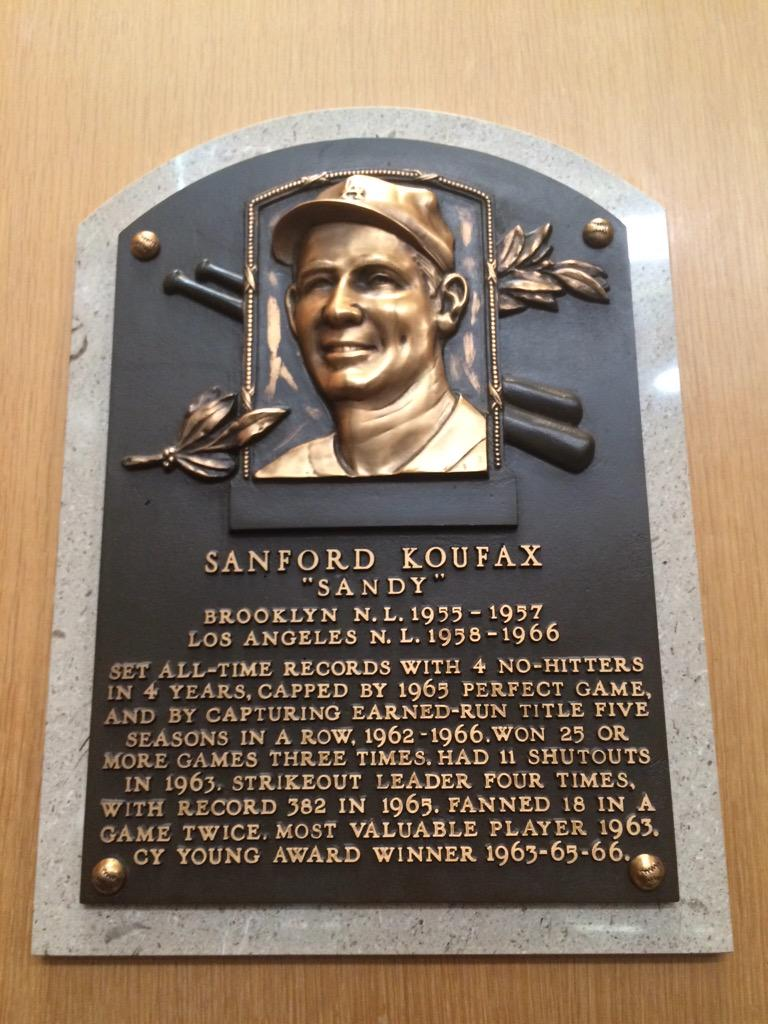
Koufax's plaque at the Baseball Hall of Fame

On June 4, 1972, the Dodgers retired Koufax's uniform number 32, alongside those of Roy Campanella (39) and Jackie Robinson (42). On June 18, 2022, a statue of Koufax was unveiled at Dodger Stadium, next to that of Robinson, his former teammate.

In 1999, The Sporting News placed Koufax at number 26 on its list of "Baseball's 100 Greatest Players". That same year, he was also named one of 30 players on the Major League Baseball All-Century Team. In 2020, The Athletic ranked him at number 70 on its "Baseball 100" list, complied by sportswriter Joe Posnanski. In 2022, ESPN ranked him 32nd on its list of the "Top 100 MLB players of All-Time."

Koufax was voted as one of the four greatest living players by Major League Baseball fans, alongside Willie Mays, Henry Aaron, and Johnny Bench, as a part of the 2015 season's "Franchise Four" vote. Before the 2015 All-Star Game in Cincinnati, he threw the ceremonial first pitch to Bench from in front of the base of the mound.

In 2022, as part of their SN Rushmore project, The Sporting News named Koufax on their "Los Angeles Mount Rushmore of Sports", along with Los Angeles Lakers basketball players Magic Johnson, Kareem Abdul-Jabbar, and Kobe Bryant. Sportswriter Scott Miller described him as "Los Angeles' first baseball icon", adding: "Without even trying, he's been the epitome of being California cool. Just comes naturally to him." That same year, MLB.com writers voted Koufax as being the greatest player in Dodgers franchise history, just ahead of Jackie Robinson:

The greatest of the greats extend their on-field dominance and define the legacy of their franchise. Both Robinson and Koufax did for the Dodgers. Both are revered for their impact on the sport, but Jackie was a social icon and Sandy was a model for his franchise's pitching heritage. Robinson excelled despite the incomprehensible burden of breaking down racial barriers. Koufax compiled unapproachable statistics that obscured the toughness and unselfishness necessary to pitch in constant pain. In a photo finish, it's Koufax.

In 2026, Koufax was honored with the Baseball Digest Lifetime Achievement Award.

== Legacy ==
=== Impact within the Jewish community ===
Koufax's importance in the Jewish community came from his athleticism; Jewish men were stereotyped as being weak and unathletic and Koufax, who became a star athlete sixteen years after the Shoah, helped break that image. His sitting out Game 1 of the 1965 World Series due to it falling on Yom Kippur helped cement his status as an icon for American Jews. Rabbi Rebecca Alpert explained the significance of his decision in 2014:

When you talk to a generation of Jewish men who grew up during the period, [his decision] mattered a lot. Jews, in particular, were seen at the time as not very masculine, as weak figures... And Koufax suffered from that. Koufax was ridiculed because he'd rather read a book. He was treated as if he were a recluse, and there was something wrong with him because he wasn't a fame-grabber. Imagine, playing in Los Angeles and not being interested in getting headlines! But his masculinity was questioned, and again in part because of an underlying antisemitism — or at least stereotyping of Jewish men as not muscular. So Koufax was also an important role model, and a real hero.

Rabbi Bruce Lustig told biographer Jane Leavy that Koufax helped change the perception of Jews: "Think of the stereotype of the Jew in literature. The ugly avariciousness of Shylock. He broke so many of them. Here was a good-looking Jew, a lefty, very powerful on the mound; a perfect player, an enigma, a man who didn't reach for fame or money. He broadened the concept of what a Jew was."

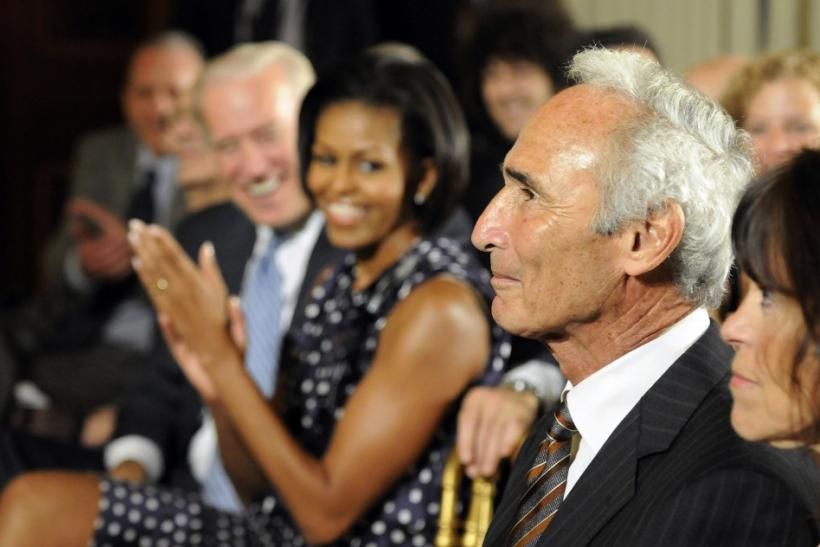
Koufax in the East Room during the White House celebration of Jewish American Heritage Month, May 2010

Koufax was inducted into the International Jewish Sports Hall of Fame in 1979, and in the National Jewish Sports Hall of Fame in 1993. In 1990, he was inducted in the inaugural class of the Southern California Jewish Sports Hall of Fame.

Koufax's likeness is a part of the mural outside Canter's Deli in Fairfax, Los Angeles which commemorates the history of the Jewish community in the city.

On May 27, 2010, Koufax was among the group of prominent Jewish Americans honored at the White House reception for Jewish American Heritage Month. In his opening remarks, President Barack Obama directly acknowledged the high esteem in which Koufax is held within the Jewish community: "This is a pretty... distinguished group. We've got senators and representatives. We've got Supreme Court justices and successful entrepreneurs, rabbinical scholars, Olympic athletes – and Sandy Koufax." The mention of Koufax's name drew the loudest cheer in the room.

That same year, he was one of two main subjects of the film Jews and Baseball: An American Love Story, alongside Hall of Famer Hank Greenberg of the Detroit Tigers. Koufax agreed to sit down for a rare interview, remarking to Ira Berkow, the writer of the film: "It doesn't make sense if it's 'Jews and Baseball' and I'm not in it."

=== Relationship with fellow minorities ===
Since early in his career, Koufax was seen as an ally to minority players by both teammates and opponents. Maury Wills recalled that, after games, the pair would go through each other's mail and sort out racist and antisemitic ones. Pitcher Joe Black, who mentored Koufax during his first spring training, said that "If he was in a restaurant, he would never shy away from sitting with the colored fellas." Cheesy Kawano, wife of clubhouse manager Nobe who used to help her husband out at Dodger Stadium, noted that Koufax was the only player on the team who knew her name and asked after her. His reputation for treating everyone with equal respect prompted catcher Earl Battey, a former World Series opponent, to say of him: "I accused him of being black. I told him he was too cool to be white."

Leavy stated that Koufax identified with minorities because he himself was one. One of the few Jewish players in baseball, he dealt with antisemitism from both within his team as well as from the outside: "More than one of his African-American peers attributed Koufax's rectitude and reticence to his being a minority... If Koufax had been a White Anglo-Saxon Protestant who played clean and kept his nose clean, he'd have been proclaimed the second coming of Jack Armstrong. But he was a Jew. So he was moody, aloof, curt, intellectual, different" and, as teammate Lou Johnson noted, held to a higher standard like any other minority. In other words, he "identified with [them] as much as they identified with him."

== In media culture ==
=== Television appearances ===
During his playing career, Koufax made a number of appearances in television programs. In 1959, he appeared as a character named Ben Cassidy in the television series Shotgun Slade. The following year, he made three television cameos: in 77 Sunset Strip as a policeman, in Bourbon Street Beat as a doorman, and in Colt .45 as a character called Johnny.

Twice, Koufax made appearances as himself on television series. In 1962, he appeared on Dennis the Menace in the episode "Dennis and the Dodger" in which he coached a little league team. In 1963, he had a non-speaking role on Mister Ed in the episode "Leo Durocher Meets Mister Ed" in which he gave up an inside-the-park home run to the title character, a talking horse.

After the 1963 World Series, Koufax, along with teammates Don Drysdale and Tommy Davis, appeared in a sketch on The Bob Hope Show with comedian Bob Hope before performing a dance routine. After their joint holdout in 1966, Koufax and Drysdale appeared on The Hollywood Palace, with host Gene Barry and comedian Milton Berle.

=== Cultural references ===
In 1965, as part of The Sound of the Dodgers, an album with songs dedicated to the team, comedian and singer Jimmy Durante recorded a song about Koufax called "Dandy Sandy".

Koufax, along with Whitey Ford, is one of the central figures in Robert Pinsky's poem "The Night Game". Though not named explicitly named, Pinsky alluded to Koufax in the final stanza as a "solution" to Ford whom he refers to in the poem as being "aristocratic" and "gentile":

Another time,
I devised a left-hander
Even more gifted
Than Whitey Ford: A Dodger.
People were amazed by him.
Once, when he was young,
He refused to pitch on Yom Kippur.

In the 1975 film, One Flew Over the Cuckoo's Nest, after not being allowed to watch it on television, Jack Nicholson's character Randle McMurphy narrates an imaginary account of the 1963 World Series in which Koufax gets knocked out of the game after surrendering a double and two home runs to three consecutive Yankees.

In the 1998 film, The Big Lebowski, John Goodman's character Walter Sobchak mentions Koufax in his response to being told he was "living in the fucking past": "Three thousand years of beautiful tradition from Moses to Sandy Koufax...You're goddamn right I'm living in the fucking past!"

Koufax is referenced in the television show Curb Your Enthusiasm's episode "Palestinian Chicken" (S8 E3) when Larry David's character incredulously asks Marty Funkhouser, played by Bob Einstein, "You're Koufaxing us?" after Marty decides against participating in a golf tournament due to it coinciding with Shabbat.

== Personal life ==
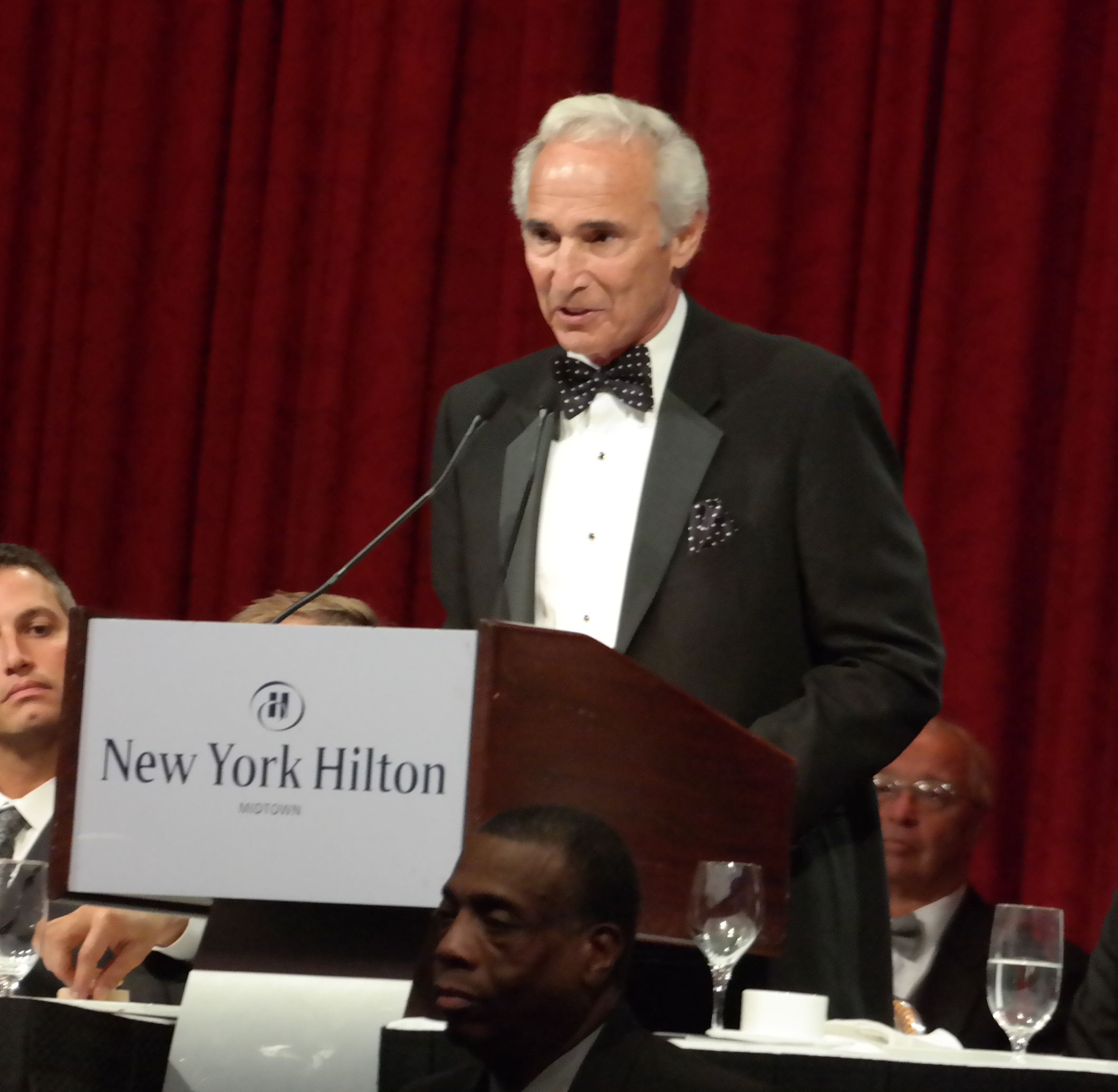
Koufax at the 2014 Baseball Writers' Association of America dinner

Koufax was raised in a secular Jewish household and did not have a bar mitzvah. Biographer Jane Leavy described him as being a "very Jewish being" who was "very Jewish in his thinking." His grandfather Max Lichtenstein, an immigrant with socialist views, instilled Jewish values and culture in his grandson, often taking Koufax to the Yiddish theatre and concerts.

His refusal to pitch on Jewish holidays throughout his career was made out of respect for his culture rather than religious devotion. (Note: Other than Yom Kippur, other Jewish holidays Koufax would not pitch on included the first night of Passover and Rosh Hashanah, notably not attending workouts before Game 4 of the 1959 World Series.) According to friends, Koufax would later become an avid reader of Jewish and Holocaust literature.

Despite being one of the biggest stars in the U.S. during his career, Koufax has kept a low profile since retirement, rarely granting interviews and making public appearances sparingly. Even during his career he was known for being shy and reserved, resulting in the perception that Koufax was reclusive and aloof. According to Leavy, Koufax was simply uncomfortable with celebrity and refuses to "cannibalize himself for profit." Koufax himself has dismissed the perception, once remarking: "My friends don't think I'm a recluse."

A smoker during his playing days, Koufax refused to endorse tobacco or be photographed smoking, feeling it would send the wrong message to children who idolized him. He also refused to endorse alcoholic products.

In 1962, to supplement his player's salary, Koufax invested in the Tropicana Motel in West Hollywood. He also founded the KNJO radio station in Thousand Oaks, California, one of the first FM radio stations to broadcast in stereo. Koufax sold both the station and motel in the late 1960s, after his retirement from baseball.

Koufax has been married three times. In 1969, he married Anne Widmark, daughter of actor Richard Widmark; they divorced in 1982. His second marriage, to personal trainer Kimberly Francis, lasted from 1985 to 1998. He married his third wife, Jane Clarke (née Purucker), in 2008. Koufax has no biological children but is the stepfather of Clarke's daughter from her previous marriage to artist John Clem Clarke and has two step-grandchildren.

In 2009, Koufax was listed among the clients who had invested with financier Bernie Madoff and was one of the victims of his Ponzi scheme. His close friend, Mets owner Fred Wilpon had recommended to Koufax that he invest with Madoff. Despite this, Koufax supported Wilpon and offered to testify on behalf of the Mets' ownership before a settlement averted a civil trial.

After receiving a lifetime achievement award from the Harold Pump Foundation in 2012, Koufax revealed in his acceptance speech that he had been diagnosed with cancer in 2010: "Twenty-six months ago, I was a so-called cancer victim. Today, I'm a survivor."

He currently resides in Vero Beach, Florida, and lives part-time in Hellertown, Pennsylvania.

In his forties and fifties, Koufax became an exercise enthusiast. He took up running to stay in shape, taking part in marathons both at home and abroad. A lifelong golfer, he often entered amateur golf championships and participated in charity pro-am tournaments and still remains active in the sport. A college basketball fan, he regularly attends the NCAA Final Four championships. Until his late sixties, he also occasionally played pick-up basketball games.

Koufax is a wine enthusiast, with extensive knowledge of the subject. He reportedly brings a different bottle of wine to The Otesaga Hotel Hall of Fame dinner whenever he attends the annual induction ceremony.

== See also ==
- Major League Baseball titles leaders
- Major League Baseball Triple Crown
- List of Los Angeles Dodgers team records
- List of Jewish Major League Baseball players
- List of Major League Baseball annual ERA leaders
- List of Major League Baseball annual strikeout leaders
- List of Major League Baseball annual wins leaders
- List of Major League Baseball annual shutout leaders
- List of Major League Baseball career strikeout leaders
- List of Major League Baseball career WHIP leaders
- List of Major League Baseball career FIP leaders
- List of Major League Baseball career ERA leaders
- List of Major League Baseball career shutout leaders
- List of Major League Baseball individual streaks
- List of Major League Baseball no-hitters
- List of Major League Baseball perfect games
- List of Major League Baseball single-game strikeout leaders
- List of Major League Baseball pitchers who have thrown an immaculate inning
- List of Major League Baseball players who spent their entire career with one franchise
- List of baseball players who went directly to Major League Baseball
- List of World Series starting pitchers

== Notes ==
Awards and achievements
| Preceded by Don Drysdale | Los Angeles Dodgers Opening Day; Starting pitcher 1964 | Succeeded by Don Drysdale |
| Preceded by Bob Purkey | Major League Player of the Month; June 1962 | Succeeded by Frank Howard |
| Preceded by Jim Bunning | Perfect game pitcher September 9, 1965 | Succeeded by Catfish Hunter |
| Preceded by Earl Wilson; Jack Kralick; Ken Johnson; Jim Maloney | No-hitter pitcher June 30, 1962; May 11, 1963; June 4, 1964; September 9, 1965 | Succeeded by Bill Monbouquette; Don Nottebart; Jim Bunning; Dave Morehead |
