= Chris Krug =

American baseball player (1939–2026)

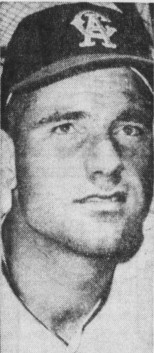
- Catcher
- Born: December 25, 1939; Los Angeles, California, U.S.
- Died: January 16, 2026 (aged 86); Wildomar, California, U.S.
- Batted: Right Threw: Right

MLB debut
- May 30, 1965, for the Chicago Cubs

Last MLB appearance
- May 13, 1969, for the San Diego Padres

MLB statistics
- Batting average: .192
- Home runs: 5
- Runs batted in: 25
- Stats at Baseball Reference

Teams
- Chicago Cubs (1965–1966); San Diego Padres (1969)

Everett Ben "Chris" Krug (/kruːɡ/ KROOG; December 25, 1939 – January 16, 2026) was an American Major League Baseball catcher. He was signed by the St. Louis Cardinals as an amateur free agent in 1958.

Krug played in parts of three major league seasons, two (1965 and 1966) with the Chicago Cubs (who drafted him out of the Cardinals' system in the 1964 minor league draft) and one (1969) with the expansion San Diego Padres.

Krug died on January 16, 2026, at the age of 86.

== Sources ==
- Jane Leavy, Sandy Koufax: A Lefty's Legacy
- Peter Golenbock, Wrigleyville
- Rip Pallotta, "One Day in Mudville" (Chapter 3)
