= 1962 Houston Colt .45s season =

Inaugural season for the Major League Baseball expansion team in Houston, Texas

1962 Houston Colt .45s
- League: National League
- Ballpark: Colt Stadium
- City: Houston, Texas
- Record: 64–96–2 (.401)
- League place: 8th
- Owners: Craig F. Cullinan Jr., Roy Hofheinz
- General managers: Paul Richards
- Managers: Harry Craft
- Television: KTRK (Al Helfer, Gene Elston, Guy Savage)
- Radio: KPRC (AM) (Al Helfer, Gene Elston, Loel Passe)

The 1962 Houston Colt .45s season was the inaugural season for the expansion team in Major League Baseball (MLB) located in Houston, Texas, which were established as a member of the National League (NL), and based at Colt Stadium.

The first manager named for the Colt .45s was Harry Craft, having previously guided the Triple-A Houston Buffaloes in the same post through the 1961 season. Introduced along with the New York Mets, the Colt .45s formed their major league roster through the 1961 expansion draft, and their first pick was shortstop Ed Bressoud.

The first game in franchise history took place on April 10, 1962, at Colt Stadium hosting the Chicago Cubs, which Houston won, 11–2. Opening Day starting pitcher Bobby Shantz threw the first pitch in club history, while Bob Aspromonte delivered the first hit. Shantz tossed a complete game and Román Mejías connected for the first home run and a total of two on the day. This was the first MLB game played in the state of Texas. Through the first three months of the season, the Colt .45s played to a 32–41 record. However, they struggled to a 5–24 record in the month of July.

Pitcher Turk Farrell represented the Colt .45s for both MLB All-Star Games that year, his second and third career selections. (Note: Major League Baseball held two All-Star Games each year from 1959 to 1962.) In September, Houston secured the first winning month in club history, at 15–12.

The Colt .45s concluded the season with a 64–96–2 record, in eighth place among 10 NL clubs, and 36 1/2 games behind the NL pennant-winning San Francisco Giants. Houston would lose 96 games each of their first three seasons, representing the original club record until 1965, when they lost 97. The 36 1/2 games behind established another club record that remained until 1975, when they placed 43 1/2 games behind the NL West division-champion Cincinnati Reds. Shantz, a stellar defender off the mound throughout his career, was recognized with the sixth of eight career Gold Glove Awards following the season. (Note: Based on performance with both the Colt .45s and St. Louis Cardinals as Shantz was acquired from Houston on May 7, 1962.)

== Offseason ==
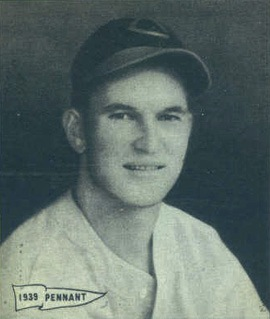
Harry Craft, a manager for Houston's Buffaloes, became the first manager of the major league franchise.

=== Summary ===
On January 3, 1962, a groundbreaking ceremony was showcased to establish the construction of the Astrodome. The ceremony included the firing of pistols into the earth by team, city, and county officials.

=== Transactions ===
- September 11, 1961: Rusty Staub was signed as an amateur free agent by the Colt .45's.
- October 13, 1961: Al Cicotte was purchased by the Colt .45s from the St. Louis Cardinals.
- March 24, 1962: Dave Philley was signed as a free agent by the Colt .45s.
- March 24, 1962: Dave Philley was traded by the Colt .45s to the Boston Red Sox for Tom Borland.
- Prior to 1962 season: J. C. Hartman was acquired by the Colt .45s from the Houston Buffaloes as part of a minor league working agreement.

=== Expansion draft ===
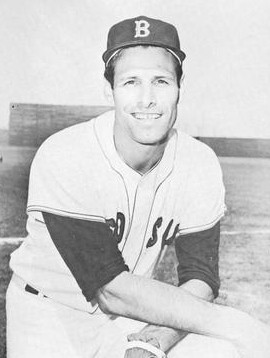
Ed Bressoud, was the top overall selection in 1961 MLB expansion draft.

The Colt .45s were one of two teams added to the National League before the 1962 season, the other being the New York Mets. This brought the number of teams in the NL to ten, matching the 1961 expansion of the American League (AL).

Legend
| | All-Star | All-Star with Houston |
| Regular phase I | $75,000 (USD, $808,045.7 today) | |
| Regular phase II | $50,000 (USD, $538,697.1 today) | |
| Premium phase | $125,000 (USD, $1,346,742.8 today) | |

Houston Colt .45s selections
| Pick | Player | Position | Phase | Previous team |
|---|---|---|---|---|
| 1 | Ed Bressoud | Infielder | Regular I | San Francisco Giants |
| 3 | Bob Aspromonte | Infielder | Regular I | Los Angeles Dodgers |
| 5 | Bob Lillis | Infielder | Regular I | St. Louis Cardinals |
| 7 | Dick Drott | Pitcher | Regular I | Chicago Cubs |
| 9 | Al Heist | Center fielder | Regular I | Chicago Cubs |
| 11 | Román Mejías | Outfielder | Regular I | Pittsburgh Pirates |
| 13 | George Williams | Second baseman | Regular I | Philadelphia Phillies |
| 15 | Jesse Hickman | Pitcher | Regular I | Philadelphia Phillies |
| 17 | Merritt Ranew | Catcher | Regular I | Milwaukee Braves |
| 19 | Don Taussig | Outfielder | Regular I | St. Louis Cardinals |
| 21 | Bobby Shantz | Pitcher | Regular I | Pittsburgh Pirates |
| 23 | Norm Larker | First baseman | Regular I | Los Angeles Dodgers |
| 25 | Sam Jones | Pitcher | Regular I | San Francisco Giants |
| 27 | Paul Roof (Note: Did not appear in the major leagues.) | Pitcher | Regular I | Milwaukee Braves |
| 29 | Ken Johnson | Pitcher | Regular I | Cincinnati Reds |
| 31 | Dick Gernert | First baseman | Regular I | Cincinnati Reds |
| 33 | Ed Olivares | Infielder | Regular II | St. Louis Cardinals |
| 35 | Jim Umbricht | Pitcher | Regular II | Pittsburgh Pirates |
| 37 | Jim Golden | Pitcher | Regular II | Los Angeles Dodgers |
| 38 | Joey Amalfitano | Infielder | Premium | San Francisco Giants |
| 40 | Turk Farrell | Pitcher | Premium | Los Angeles Dodgers |
| 42 | Hal W. Smith | Catcher | Premium | Pittsburgh Pirates |
| 44 | Al Spangler | Outfielder | Premium | Milwaukee Braves |
Source::

=== 1961 minor league affiliates ===
The Colt .45s and Mets were established on October 17, 1960, giving them time to acquire professional minor-league players, sign amateur free agents (there was no MLB first-year player draft until 1965) and enter into working agreements with minor league affiliates during the 1961 season. Houston had formal working agreements with two minor league baseball teams in 1961 (see table below). In addition, the roster of the 1961 Houston Buffs of the Triple-A American Association, officially a minor-league affiliate of the Chicago Cubs, would include a handful of players signed by the Colt .45s. The most prominent of these was Dave Giusti, then 21, who went on to a 15-year MLB career.

| Level | Team | League | Manager |
|---|---|---|---|
| A | Jacksonville Jets | Sally League | Tom Saffell and Dixie Howell |
| D | Salisbury Braves | Western Carolinas League | Alex Cosmidis |

== Regular season ==
=== Summary ===
==== The inaugural series ====
| Cubs Opening Day starting lineup | | | Colt .45s Opening Day starting lineup | | |
| Uniform | Player | Position | Uniform | Player | Position |
|---|---|---|---|---|---|
| 24 | Lou Brock | Center fielder | 14 | Bob Aspromonte | Third baseman |
| 16 | Ken Hubbs | Second baseman | 21 | Al Spangler | Center fielder |
| 26 | Billy Williams | Left fielder | 25 | Román Mejías | Right fielder |
| 14 | Ernie Banks | First baseman | 10 | Norm Larker | First baseman |
| 21 | George Altman | Right fielder | 23 | Jim Pendleton | Left fielder |
| 10 | Ron Santo | Third baseman | 8 | Hal Smith | Catcher |
| 19 | Elder White (Note: Major League debut.) | Shortstop | 11 | Joey Amalfitano | Second baseman |
| 9 | Cuno Barragan | Catcher | 18 | Don Buddin | Shortstop |
| 43 | Don Cardwell | Pitcher | 42 | Bobby Shantz | Pitcher |
Attendance: 25,271 Sources:

Tuesday, April 10, 1962 1:00 pm (CT) at Colt Stadium in Houston, Texas
| Team | 1 | 2 | 3 | 4 | 5 | 6 | 7 | 8 | 9 | R | H | E |
|---|---|---|---|---|---|---|---|---|---|---|---|---|
| Chicago | 0 | 0 | 0 | 0 | 0 | 0 | 1 | 1 | 0 | 2 | 5 | 0 |
| Houston | 1 | 0 | 4 | 0 | 0 | 0 | 3 | 3 | × | 11 | 13 | 2 |
WP: Bobby Shantz (1-0) LP: Don Cardwell (0-1); Home runs: CHC: Ernie Banks (1); HOU: Román Mejías 2 (2), Hal Smith (1)

Umpiring crew
| Position | Umpire |
|---|---|
| Home plate | Dusty Boggess |
| First base | Stan Landes |
| Second base | Vinnie Smith |
| Third base | Mel Steiner |

The Colt .45s started their inaugural season on April 10, 1962, with an 11–2 triumph over the Chicago Cubs. Southpaw Bobby Shantz, a former American League (AL) Most Valuable Player (MVP), started for Houston, while his mound opponent was the veteran, Don Cardwell. Shantz struck out Cubs leadoff hitter, Lou Brock, for the first out. Kenny Hubbs ground out to shortstop Don Buddin for the second out and first fielding chance. Billy Williams then singled to right field, but Shantz retired cleanup hitter Ernie Banks on a ground out to third baseman Bob Aspromonte. During the bottom of the first frame, Aspromonte led off for the Colts to take the club's first-ever plate appearance, and plugged a ground ball single to left field for the premier safety in club history. Center fielder Al Spangler lined a triple deep down the right field line, which scored Aspromonte, and allowed Houston take their first-ever lead, 1–0. During the bottom of the third inning with no outs, Román Mejías connected for the first home run in Colts' franchise history. Two outs later, catcher Hal Smith followed suit for his first home run of the season. Mejías connected for a second home run in the eighth inning, on the way to going 3-for-5 with six runs batted in (RBI). Spangler was 2-for-3 with two bases on balls, and Shantz went the distance to earn both the first complete game and victory in Houston franchise history.

By virtue of driving in 6 runs in the Colt .45s' inaugural game, Mejías established the single-game franchise RBI record, which stood until August 29, 1989, when Rafael Ramírez produced 7 RBI in a ten-inning game, also against the Cubs. (Note: For nine-inning games, Mejías' 6 RBI remained as the club record until June 14, 1992, when Pete Incaviglia collected 7 RBI. Criteria: For single games, up to 1992, playing for HOU, in the regular season, requiring Runs Batted In ≥ 6, sorted by ascending date.) Mejías continued the momentum of his brilliant start, establishing another Colt .45s record with an eight-game hitting streak to open the 1962 campaign, and followed that up by starting another hitting streak the following month.

In the second game on April 11, Hal Woodeshick and Dick "Turk" Farrell combined to produce Houston's first shutout victory, 2–0. Hal Smith stroked a two-run single in the first innings to account for all of the game's scoring. Moreover, this contest actualized the franchise's first-ever rain delay, spanning one hour and seven minutes. During the Opening Series finale on April 12, Dean Stone tossed the first complete-game shutout in Colts franchise history, a three-hitter that led a 3–0 win. Stone's effort also capped a three-game sweep of the Cubs in Houston's first-ever series in their first homestand. With a 3–0 record, the Colt .45s retained a share of the National League lead with the San Francisco Giants.

==== Rest of April ====
Following their inaugural three-game series during which the hosted Chicago, the Colts ventured to Connie Mack Stadium in Philadelphia for the first-ever contest on the road in franchise annals on April 13, 1962, where they also met their first-ever defeat. There, the Phillies triumphed, 3–2, as Turk Farrell sustained his first defeat in a Colt .45 uniform. Norm Larker and Joey Amalfitano led Houston with two hits apiece. Right-hander Jack Hamilton scattered seven hits as he went the distance for Philadelphia, while Tony González tripled and homered.

Houston then hosted the St. Louis Cardinals for the first time on April 24, 1962. Prior to joining the National League, Houston's Buffaloes had served as one of the Cardinals' minor league affiliates over a span of four decades, where many future Cardinals stars made their way to the major leagues. Don Taussig, a Colt .45s expansion draftee from the Cardinals, hit the go-ahead home run off Larry Jackson in the sixth inning that set a 4–3 Colts victory. Hal Woodeshick navigated five errors to earn the victory. This was Taussig's only home run for Houston, and the final of his major league career.

On April 25, Merritt Ranew assembled the first four-hit game for the Colt .45s, which occurred over a 17-inning contest against St. Louis that concluded in a 5–5 tie. Over eight plate appearances, Merritt tripled and homered. (Note: For single games, in 1962, playing for HOU, in the regular season, requiring hits ≥ 4, sorted by ascending date.) This was the first final score resulting in a tie in club history, as well as the Colts' longest bout of the campaign. Their overall record maintained above .500 at 6–5–1 (.542); however, it would be the final date in franchise history until April 2006 that they ended the day with an all-time winning record.

Spangler furnished the first four-hit contest for Houston which was played in nine innings and under on April 28. Houston dropped this outcome to Milwaukee, however, 9–3.

The first walk-off home run in franchise history—as well as the first walk-off hit—were simultaneously furnished by Mejías on April 29. A 3–2 thriller over the Milwaukee Braves, Farrell earned his first victory in a Colts uniform, seizing the final out of the top of the ninth. All three of Houston's runs were via the long ball; Hal Smith and Jim Pendleton also went deep.

The team finished April with a 7–8 (.467) record, 4 games in front of fellow-expansion club the New York Mets and only 5 games behind the National League-leading Giants and Pittsburgh Pirates.

==== May ====
During a five-day span in early May, Colt .45s hurlers established multiple strikeout firsts in franchise annals.

Ken Johnson achieved Houston's first double-digit strikeout game during his start on May 2, with 10 punchouts over 7 innings. Though he got more whiffs than his mound opponent, Bob Gibson (nine), Gibson hurled a masterful complete game performance as the Cardinals defeated the Colt .45s, 4–1. All four runs were charged to Johnson, who fell to 0–4, as Bill White took him deep and Julio Gotay collected three safeties.

Two days after Johnson tossed the first double-digit strikeout game for the new franchise, on May 4, Bob Bruce matched this achievement in a relief outing with 10 for the first time in club history. (Note: Remained the franchise record for a relief appearance until surpassed by Jim Ray with 11 whiffs on April 15, 1968, against the Mets.) During the opening frame, Milwaukee ambushed Colts starter Woodeshick with four tallies. Woodeshick recorded just two outs when Bruce entered in the bottom of the first, striking out Amado Samuel to retire the side. Bruce (1–0) pitched into the ninth and picked up his first victory as a Colt .45 while the offense mounted a comeback. Dick Gernert plated Amalfitano for the go-ahead score in the top of the seventh. Hal Smith and Jim Pendleton homered in a 7–4 final.

Through Aspromonte's and Larker's performance on May 5, the Colt .45s recorded their first contest in which two or more hitters each collected four or more hits. This occurred in a 6–5 defeat to Milwaukee in 12 innings.

Keeping with new pitching strikeout achievements, on May 6, Turk Farrell whiffed 11 Braves during his start to take the single-game franchise lead. The second set of a doubleheader at County Stadium, Farrell went the distance and earned a game score of 84 as Houston ran away with it, 9–1. Farrell (2–2) surrendered just four hits and two bases on balls. Mejías went deep twice and plated five runs, while Pidge Browne and Norm Larker also homered. This was Mejías' second five-RBI contest of the season, and first since Opening Day, while Browne's home run was the only deep drive of his major league career.

On May 10, Mejías connected for the first-ever inside-the-park home run for the franchise, a fly ball to center field during the bottom of the first inning off Don Drysdale of the Los Angeles Dodgers. However, in the top of the fourth, Larry Burright connected for a three-run jack off Bob Bruce, his first in the major leagues. Los Angeles never looked back, winning 6–2, while handing Bruce his first loss of the season.

Beginning May 25, Mejías initiated another hitting streak for 16 games to establish one of Houston's earliest club records, during which he carried a .368 batting average. This hitting streak lasted until June 10, and stood as the record stood until Rusty Staub hit in 20 consecutively from June 30 to July 21, 1967.

A new idea was presented to Harris County commissioners on May 31 by Weldon Appelt to build a stadium using arches to facilitate construction, leading to a proposing for a domed stadium. Meanwhile, the Colt .45s defeated the Chicago Cubs, 10–6, after erupting for five runs ninth inning.

==== June ====
By June 2, with the second loss to the Pirates in Pittsburgh, the Colt .45s had fallen to 16 games behind the eventual NL champion Giants, a deficit that no pre-Wild Card era team had ever recovered from to make the post season.

On June 3, Mejías and Bob Lillis teamed to give the Colts their first four-hit duo during a nine-inning contest, which they were 10–6 victors over Pittsburgh.

While hosting the Dodgers on June 10, Colts shortstop Don Buddin hit a grand slam during the second game of a doubleheader, the first-ever slam in franchise history, and the first-ever hit at Colt Stadium. However, Houston's climate made impact as well, as 78 fans and umpire Jocko Conlan suffered heat stroke. Though the Dodgers swept the doubleheader by scores of 9–3 and 9–7, many of their players complained about the excess heat. However, Buddin's eventful slam came ignited a later-inning rally during the second game, as he golfed a Joe Moeller pitch to left in the bottom of the sixth with Los Angeles leading, 9–1. In the bottom of the ninth, Houston loaded the bases again with none out during a succession of the first five batters to reach base, including on an error and fielder's choice. Two runs scored; however, Aspromonte was retired on a groundout for the final out of the contest.

Ten days after the first grand slam in franchise history by Buddin, Norm Larker blasted the Colts' second on June 20, and first on the road. The second slam of Larker's career (he had hit his first less than a year earlier as a member of the Dodgers), his was a go-ahead blast off Juan Marichal at Candlestick Park to give Houston a 5–2 advantage over San Francisco. Román Mejías slugged his 17th home run during the top of the first to give Houston a 1–0 edge. Joey Amalfitano tripled and scored three runs. Houston batters collected eight safeties while coaxing nine base on balls on the way to a 9–5 triumph.

Following a doubleheader split with New York on June 22, the Colts held a 30–36–1 (.455) record. In the nightcap, starter Jim Golden earned the complete game victory, while, at the plate, produced a career day. He logged career-highs with of three hits and three runs, while slugging the only two triples of his Major League career. Houston scored 16, and the Mets, 3.

==== July ====
On July 10, Turk Farrell became Houston's first All-Star Game representative, receiving the invite to Game One held at District of Columbia Stadium on July 10. Farrell did not participate in this contest. Maury Wills sprinted from first base for the National League's third run of the game, winners by a 3–1 score, in the top of the eighth inning when Giants teammate Jim Davenport hit a single. Wills won All-Star Game MVP honors as well as the NL MVP later that season.

On July 20, Turk Farrell whiffed 12 Cardinals to establish a new single-game strikeout record for Houston, which remained so until he struck out 13 on May 10, 1963, against the Cubs. Farrell (6–12) earned the complete game and victory via walk-off, 4–3. With one out in the bottom of the ninth, Román Mejías' two-run single won it on "Stan Musial Day" in Houston. However, Farrell brewed controversy when he admitted to having thrown the Cardinals legend an illegal spitball, which Musial punished for an RBI single. Batting .349, Musial recorded two hits and plated two of St. Louis' tallies.

The win on July 20 broke a five-game losing streak; however, this was the Colts' third losing streak of at least of five games in July. Before the month concluded, Houston was mired in another losing streak that lasted six outings, going 5–24 (.172) overall in their first July.

==== August ====
On August 14, Ken Johnson struck out 12 to tie the then-club record, established just weeks earlier by Farrell on July 20. Johnson turned in a quality start, working 8 innings and yielding 3 runs. The Cardinals' Bob Gibson tossed a extra innings complete game, but lost after 9 2/3 frames when Hal Smith's groundout allowed Román Mejías to scamper home with the decisive, walk-off tally. The club record of 12 whiff remained until the following May 10, when Farrell-whiffed 13. (Note: For single games, from 1962 to 1966, playing for HOU, in the regular season, requiring strikeouts ≥ 12, sorted by descending strikeouts.)

With an August 21 loss at the hands of the Philadelphia Phillies, the Houston Colt .45s were mathematically eliminated from the postseason with a 37-game deficit to the Dodgers with 37 games remaining.

==== September ====
With a 4-for-6 performance on September 8, Bob Lillis led the Colts to a 6–5 triumph over the Mets in 10 innings during the nightcap of a twinbill. Lillis became the first Colt to record three four-hit bouts.

On September 12, Carl Warwick assembled his third four-hit game of the season, joining Bob Lillis as the team leader for such outings during the season.

Bob Aspromonte's NL-record 57-game error-free streak among third basemen ended during the lidlifter of doubleheader on September 20 versus the Mets. Jim Golden drove in three runs while claiming the triumph from the mound for a final of Houston 7, New York 2. In the nightcap, Aspromonte recorded the first five-hit game in franchise history while scoring thrice. The Colt won, 5–4, in 12 innings. (Note: For single games, playing for HOU, in the regular season, requiring hits ≥ 5, sorted by ascending date.) Hal Smith homered and drove in the game-winning run in the top of the 12th inning. This was Aspromonte's second bout of the season collecting four or more safeties. New York broke a major league record for defeats at home with their 57th at Polo Grounds.

==== Performance overview ====
The Houston Colt .45s concluded their inaugural season with a record of 64–96–2 (.401), for eighth place of ten clubs in the National League, trailing the NL pennant-winning San Francisco Giants by 36 1/2 games. During each of their first three seasons, Houston lost 96 games to tie the default record set in 1962, until they set a new club record with 97 defeats in 1965. Houston would lose 90 or more contests in each of their first seven seasons until producing their first .500 season in 1969, and in 1972, realized their first-ever winning season, at 84–69 (.549). The Colt .45s hosted 924,456 fans during their inaugural season, which remained the most over their first three seasons, all at Colt Stadium, until 1965, when they drew over 2 million for the first time during their inaugural season at the Astrodome.

To get an idea of how the first season was for Houston, look at the team's best pitcher, Richard "Turk" Farrell. A starter for the Colt .45s, he was primarily a relief pitcher when he was with the Los Angeles Dodgers and Philadelphia Phillies. Turk lost 20 games in 1962, but had an earned run average (ERA) of 3.02. Turk was selected to both All-Star games that year.

Farrell led the pitching staff with 203 strikeouts which remained the club record for a single season until broken by Don Wilson in 1969 when he fanned 235. Prior to that, Mike Cuellar tied the record with 203 in 1967.

A late-blooming outfielder emerged as a bright spot for the .Colt 45s line up in 1962. Román Mejías, acquired from the Pirates during the expansion draft, was named the Colt .45s starting right fielder and emerged as a breakout performer during his age-36 season. Prior to coming to Houston, he had appeared in 308 games over six seasons with Pittsburgh, batting .245 with 17 home runs and 83 RBI. In Houston, Mejías played the best baseball of his major league career, simultaneously establishing career highs in virtually every offensive category, while leading the team in numerous categories, which introduced many of the original single-season franchise offensive records. While he played better the first half of the season, an injury slowed him the second half of the season. However, he still finished with a .286 batting average, 24 home runs, and 76 RBI. His modesty and his hard play made him a fan favorite that year. Despite his excellent performance, Mejías was traded to the Boston Red Sox in the fall of 1962.

Bobby Shantz, Houston first Opening Day starting pitcher, also became the team's first Gold Glove Award winner. This was the sixth of eight consecutive Gold Gloves for the left-hander. (Note: Shantz won the Gold Glove Award in each of the first eight seasons in which it was conferred.) Shantz remained in a Colts uniform for just one month, as he was traded on May 7, 1962, to the St. Louis Cardinals for John Anderson and Carl Warwick. Houston's next Gold Glove winner was third baseman Doug Rader in 1970, and next Gold Glove-winning pitcher was Dallas Keuchel in 2014.

Reliever Don McMahon led major league relievers with a 1.69 earned run average (ERA, minimum 50 innings pitched) for the season, which included his totals with Milwaukee and Houston. McMahon's 1.53 ERA with the Colts remained the team record for relief pitchers until 2019, when Will Harris yielded a 1.50 ERA. Prior to Harris, the two closest finishes were by Larry Andersen in 1989 (1.54) and Billy Wagner in 1989 (1.57). (Note: For single seasons, at least 80% games in relief, at least 50 Innings pitched, playing for HOU, in the regular season, requiring earned run average ≤ 2.25, sorted by ascending earned run average.)

=== League standings ===
National League
| Team | W | L | Pct. | GB | Home | Road |
|---|---|---|---|---|---|---|
| San Francisco Giants | 103 | 62 | .624 | — | 61‍–‍21 | 42‍–‍41 |
| Los Angeles Dodgers | 102 | 63 | .618 | 1 | 54‍–‍29 | 48‍–‍34 |
| Cincinnati Reds | 98 | 64 | .605 | 3½ | 58‍–‍23 | 40‍–‍41 |
| Pittsburgh Pirates | 93 | 68 | .578 | 8 | 51‍–‍30 | 42‍–‍38 |
| Milwaukee Braves | 86 | 76 | .531 | 15½ | 49‍–‍32 | 37‍–‍44 |
| St. Louis Cardinals | 84 | 78 | .519 | 17½ | 44‍–‍37 | 40‍–‍41 |
| Philadelphia Phillies | 81 | 80 | .503 | 20 | 46‍–‍34 | 35‍–‍46 |
| Houston Colt .45s | 64 | 96 | .400 | 36½ | 32‍–‍48 | 32‍–‍48 |
| Chicago Cubs | 59 | 103 | .364 | 42½ | 32‍–‍49 | 27‍–‍54 |
| New York Mets | 40 | 120 | .250 | 60½ | 22‍–‍58 | 18‍–‍62 |

=== Record versus opponents ===
National League

1962 National League record Sources:
| Team | CHC | CIN | HOU | LAD | MIL | NYM | PHI | PIT | SF | STL |
|---|---|---|---|---|---|---|---|---|---|---|
| Chicago | — | 4–14 | 7–11 | 4–14 | 8–10 | 9–9 | 10–8 | 4–14 | 6–12 | 7–11 |
| Cincinnati | 14–4 | — | 13–5 | 9–9 | 13–5 | 13–5 | 8–10 | 13–5 | 7–11 | 8–10 |
| Houston | 11–7 | 5–13 | — | 6–12 | 7–11 | 13–3–1 | 1–17 | 5–13 | 7–11 | 9–9–1 |
| Los Angeles | 14–4 | 9–9 | 12–6 | — | 10–8 | 16–2 | 14–4 | 10–8 | 10–11 | 7–11 |
| Milwaukee | 10–8 | 5–13 | 11–7 | 8–10 | — | 12–6 | 11–7 | 10–8 | 7–11 | 12–6 |
| New York | 9–9 | 5–13 | 3–13–1 | 2–16 | 6–12 | — | 4–14 | 2–16 | 4–14 | 5–13 |
| Philadelphia | 8–10 | 10–8 | 17–1 | 4–14 | 7–11 | 14–4 | — | 7–10 | 5–13 | 9–9 |
| Pittsburgh | 14–4 | 5–13 | 13–5 | 8–10 | 8–10 | 16–2 | 10–7 | — | 7–11 | 12–6 |
| San Francisco | 12–6 | 11–7 | 11–7 | 11–10 | 11–7 | 14–4 | 13–5 | 11–7 | — | 9–9 |
| St. Louis | 11–7 | 10–8 | 9–9–1 | 11–7 | 6–12 | 13–5 | 9–9 | 6–12 | 9–9 | — |

=== Notable transactions ===
- May 7, 1962: Bobby Shantz was traded by the Colt .45s to the St. Louis Cardinals for John Anderson and Carl Warwick.
- June 26, 1962: Bob Cerv was purchased by the Colt .45s from the New York Yankees.
- July 30, 1962: Bob Cerv was released by the Colt .45s.

=== Roster ===
1962 Houston Colt .45s
Roster
| Pitchers: 39 John Anderson; 30 Bob Bruce; 33 George Brunet; 31 Al Cicotte; 36 Dick Drott; 43 Turk Farrell; 34 Dave Giusti; 35 Jim Golden; 36,40 Ken Johnson; 39 Russ Kemmerer; 31 Don McMahon; 42 Bobby Shantz; 33 Dean Stone; 44 Bobby Tiefenauer; 32,45 Jim Umbricht; 36 George Witt; 46 Hal Woodeshick | Catchers: 9 Jim Campbell; 7 Merritt Ranew; 8 Hal Smith; Infielders: 11 Joey Amalfitano; 14 Bob Aspromonte; 27 Pidge Browne; 18 Don Buddin; 19 Ernie Fazio; 17 Dick Gernert; 16 Billy Goodman; 18 J. C. Hartman; 10 Norm Larker; 15 Bob Lillis; 26 Johnny Temple; 19 George Williams | Outfielders: 4 Jim Busby; 17 Bob Cerv; 22 Ron Davis; 22 Al Heist; 25 Román Mejías; 23 Jim Pendleton; 24 Dave Roberts; 21 Al Spangler; 20,24 Don Taussig; 20 Carl Warwick; 24 Johnny Weekly | Manager: 1 Harry Craft; Coaches: 2 Jimmy Adair (First base); 3 Bobby Bragan (Bullpen); 4 Jim Busby (Third base); 5 Cot Deal (Pitching); 6 Lum Harris (Third base) |

=== Game log ===
Houston Colt .45s 1962 Regular Season Game Log
April 1962 (7–8)

| # | Date | Opponent | Score | Win | Loss | Save | Attendance | Record |
|---|---|---|---|---|---|---|---|---|
| 1 | April 10 | Cubs | 11–2 | Shantz (1–0) | Cardwell (0–1) | – | 25,271 | 1–0 |
| 2 | April 11 | Cubs | 2–0 | Woodeshick (1–0) | Hobbie (0–1) | Farrell (1) | 20,336 | 2–0 |
| 3 | April 12 | Cubs | 2–0 | Stone (1–0) | Curtis (0–1) | – | 7,838 | 3–0 |
| 4 | April 13 | @ Phillies | 2–3 | Hamilton (1–0) | Farrell (0–1) | – | 12,633 | 3–1 |
| 5 | April 14 | @ Phillies | 0–3 | Mahaffey (2–0) | Johnson (0–1) | – | 2,732 | 3–2 |
| 6 | April 17 | @ Mets | 5–2 (11) | Golden (1–0) | Moford (0–1) | Tiefenauer (1) | 3,191 | 4–2 |
| 7 | April 18 | @ Cubs | 2–3 (10) | Ellsworth (1–0) | Farrell (0–2) | – | 3,318 | 4–3 |
| 8 | April 19 | @ Cubs | 6–0 | Stone (2–0) | Cardwell (0–3) | – | 3,835 | 5–3 |
| 9 | April 21 | Phillies | 1–3 | McLish (1–0) | Johnson (0–2) | Baldschun (1) | 21,841 | 5–4 |
| 10 | April 22 | Phillies | 3–4 | Owens (1–1) | Giusti (0–1) | Baldschun (2) | 13,130 | 5–5 |
| 11 | April 24 | Cardinals | 4–3 | Woodeshick (2–0) | Jackson (2–1) | – | 19,335 | 6–5 |
| 12 | April 25 | Cardinals | 5–5 (17) | – | – | – | 17,265 | 6–5 |
| 13 | April 26 | Cardinals | 2–3 | Gibson (1–1) | Johnson (0–3) | – | 15,129 | 6–6 |
| 14 | April 27 | Braves | 1–2 | Shaw (2–1) | Shantz (1–1) | – | 16,160 | 6–7 |
| 15 | April 28 | Braves | 3–9 | Butler (1–0) | Giusti (0–2) | – | 22,501 | 6–8 |
| 16 | April 29 | Braves | 3–2 | Farrell (1–2) | McMahon (0–1) | – | 21,050 | 7–8 |

May 1962 (12–19)

| # | Date | Opponent | Score | Win | Loss | Save | Attendance | Record |
|---|---|---|---|---|---|---|---|---|
| 17 | May 1 | @ Cardinals | 4–6 | Washburn (2–0) | Stone (2–1) | Bauta (1) | 4,924 | 7–9 |
| 18 | May 2 | @ Cardinals | 1–4 | Gibson (2–1) | Johnson (0–4) | – | 7,880 | 7–10 |
| 19 | May 3 | @ Cardinals | 0–4 | Simmons (4–0) | Giusti (0–3) | – | 6,436 | 7–11 |
| 20 | May 4 | @ Braves | 7–4 | Bruce (1–0) | Hendley (2–2) | Farrell (2) | 7,811 | 8–11 |
| 21 | May 5 | @ Braves | 5–6 (12) | Curtis (1–2) | Woodeschick (2–1) | – | 4,920 | 8–12 |
| 22 | May 6 | @ Braves | 2–3 | Spahn (3–3) | Golden (1–1) | – | 12,635 | 8–13 |
| 23 | May 6 | @ Braves | 9–1 | Farrell (2–2) | Willey (0–2) | – | 12,635 | 9–13 |
| 24 | May 7 | Dodgers | 9–6 | Tiefenauer (1–0) | Richert (1–1) | – | 19,170 | 10–13 |
| 25 | May 8 | Dodgers | 6–9 (10) | Perranoski (2–0) | Tiefenauer (1–1) | Roebuck (1) | 17,483 | 10–14 |
| 26 | May 9 | Dodgers | 2–9 | Podres (2–2) | Richert (1–1) | – | 12,684 | 10–15 |
| 27 | May 10 | Dodgers | 2–6 | Drysdale (5–1) | Bruce (1–1) | – | 15,076 | 10–16 |
| 28 | May 11 | Giants | 7–0 | Farrell (3–2) | Perry (2–1) | – | 19,003 | 11–16 |
| 29 | May 12 | Giants | 0–11 | Marichal (6–2) | Woodeshick (2–2) | – | 26,311 | 11–17 |
| 30 | May 13 | Giants | 2–7 | Sanford (4–2) | Johnson (0–5) | – | 19,879 | 11–18 |
| 31 | May 15 | @ Dodgers | 7–10 | Perranoski (3–0) | Tiefenauer (1–2) | – | 18,675 | 11–19 |
| 32 | May 16 | @ Dodgers | 2–5 | Moeller (2–3) | Farrell (3–3) | Roebuck (3) | 16,075 | 11–20 |
| 33 | May 17 | @ Dodgers | 4–2 (10) | Roebuck (2–0) | Tiefenauer (1–2) | – | 17,639 | 11–21 |
| 34 | May 18 | @ Giants | 3–2 (10) | Johnson (1–5) | Sanford (4–3) | – | 18,544 | 12–21 |
| 35 | May 19 | @ Giants | 2–10 | McCormick (1–1) | Witt (0–1) | Larson (3) | 16,701 | 12–22 |
| 36 | May 20 | @ Giants | 6–5 | Bruce (2–1) | Marichal (7–3) | Farrell (3) | 40,932 | 13–22 |
| 37 | May 20 | @ Giants | 4–7 | Pierce (6–0) | Woodeshick (2–3) | – | 40,932 | 13–23 |
| 38 | May 21 | Mets | 3–2 | Golden (2–1) | Mizell (1–2) | – | 16,317 | 14–23 |
| 39 | May 22 | Mets | 3–2 | Farrell (4–3) | Hook (3–3) | – | 11,980 | 15–23 |
| 40 | May 23 | Reds | 2–0 | Johnson (2–5) | Purkey (7–1) | – | 9,266 | 16–23 |
| 41 | May 24 | Reds | 0–5 | Jay (6–4) | Witt (0–2) | – | 8,570 | 16–24 |
| 42 | May 25 | Pirates | 3–4 (13) | Face (2–1) | Tiefenauer (1–4) | Sturdivant (1) | 11,350 | 16–25 |
| 43 | May 26 | Pirates | 2–0 | Golden (3–1) | Friend (4–6) | – | 13,909 | 17–25 |
| 44 | May 27 | Pirates | 2–7 | Law (2–1) | Johnson (2–6) | – | 11,793 | 17–26 |
| 45 | May 28 | @ Reds | 6–9 | Jay (7–4) | Farrell (4–4) | – | 8,979 | 17–27 |
| 46 | May 30 | @ Cubs | 8–6 (14) | Giusti (1–3) | Schultz (3–2) | – | 17,842 | 18–27 |
| 47 | May 30 | @ Cubs | 10–6 | McMahon (1–1) | Elston (2–2) | – | 3,722 | 19–27 |

June 1962 (13–14)

| # | Date | Opponent | Score | Win | Loss | Save | Attendance | Record |
|---|---|---|---|---|---|---|---|---|
| 48 | June 1 | @ Pirates | 4–8 | Face (3–1) | Golden (3–2) | – | 14,961 | 19–28 |
| 49 | June 2 | @ Pirates | 2–9 | Law (3–1) | Farrell (4–5) | – | 11,703 | 19–29 |
| 50 | June 3 | @ Pirates | 10–6 | Tiefenauer (2–4) | Sturdivant (3–3) | McMahon (1) | 24,282 | 20–29 |
| 51 | June 3 | @ Pirates | 10–3 | Johnson (3–6) | McBean (5–2) | – | 24,282 | 21–29 |
| 52 | June 5 | Braves | 7–1 | Bruce (3–1) | Piche (3–1) | – | 11,593 | 22–29 |
| 53 | June 6 | Braves | 3–6 | Burdette (3–4) | Golden (3–3) | – | 11,569 | 22–30 |
| 54 | June 7 | Braves | 3–2 | McMahon (2–1) | Spahn (6–6) | – | 14,818 | 23–30 |
| 55 | June 8 | Dodgers | 3–4 (13) | L. Sherry (4–2) | McMahon (2–2) | – | 15,877 | 23–31 |
| 56 | June 9 | Dodgers | 13–1 | Bruce (4–1) | Williams (6–2) | – | 11,908 | 24–31 |
| 57 | June 10 | Dodgers | 3–9 | Drysdale (10–3) | Golden (3–4) | – | 30,027 | 24–32 |
| 58 | June 10 | Dodgers | 7–9 | Moeller (5–4) | Woodeshick (2–4) | Perranoski (7) | 30,027 | 24–33 |
| 59 | June 11 | Mets | 1–3 | Jackson (3–7) | Farrell (4–6) | – | 8,920 | 24–34 |
| 60 | June 12 | Mets | 3–2 | Johnson (4–6) | Anderson (3–6) | – | 7,344 | 25–34 |
| 61 | June 14 | Mets | 10–2 | Bruce (5–1) | Hook (4–7) | – | 10,761 | 26–34 |
| 62 | June 15 | @ Dodgers | 2–0 | Golden (4–4) | Drysdale (10–4) | – | 22,709 | 27–34 |
| 63 | June 16 | @ Dodgers | 4–1 | Farrell (5–6) | Podres (3–6) | – | 51,530 | 28–34 |
| 64 | June 17 | @ Dodgers | 2–6 | Roebuck (4–0) | Johnson (4–7) | L. Sherry (5) | 47,397 | 28–35 |
| 65 | June 19 | @ Giants | 6–4 | Giusti (2–3) | O'Dell (7–6) | Farrell (4) | 18,749 | 29–35 |
| 66 | June 20 | @ Giants | 9–5 | Stone (3–2) | Miller (3–2) | McMahon (2) | 10,430 | 30–35 |
| 67 | June 22 | @ Mets | 0–2 | Jackson (4–8) | Farrell (5–7) | – | 11,484 | 30–36 |
| 68 | June 22 | @ Mets | 16–3 | Golden (5–4) | B. Miller (0–5) | – | 11,484 | 31–36 |
| 69 | June 23 | @ Mets | 2–13 | Hook (5–8) | Johnson (4–8) | – | 6,425 | 31–37 |
| 70 | June 25 | @ Phillies | 3–4 | Green (2–2) | Woodeshick (2–5) | – | 8,087 | 31–38 |
| 71 | June 26 | @ Phillies | 0–2 | Hamilton (5–5) | Farrell (5–8) | – | 18,707 | 31–39 |
| 72 | June 26 | @ Phillies | 4–6 | Mahaffey (9–8) | Golden (5–5) | – | 18,707 | 31–40 |
| 73 | June 29 | Reds | 0–4 | O'Toole (6–9) | Johnson (4–9) | – | 7,612 | 31–41 |
| 74 | June 30 | Reds | 7–3 (7) | Bruce (6–1) | Maloney (2–3) | – | 9,758 | 32–41 |

July 1962 (5–24)

| # | Date | Opponent | Score | Win | Loss | Save | Attendance | Record |
|---|---|---|---|---|---|---|---|---|
| 75 | July 1 | Reds | 1–6 | Jay (11–7) | Golden (5–6) | – | 6,666 | 32–42 |
| 76 | July 2 | Pirates | 2–4 | Friend (8–8) | Woodeshick (2–6) | Face (14) | 11,760 | 32–43 |
| 77 | July 3 | Pirates | 2–5 | Haddix (7–3) | Johnson (4–10) | Face (15) | 10,729 | 32–44 |
| 78 | July 4 | Pirates | 0–7 | Law (7–3) | Bruce (6–2) | – | 20,005 | 32–45 |
| 79 | July 4 | Pirates | 3–4 | Francis (5–5) | Golden (5–7) | Face (16) | 20,005 | 32–46 |
| 80 | July 6 | @ Reds | 2–0 | Woodeshick (3–6) | Jay (11–8) | – | 15,871 | 33–46 |
| 81 | July 7 | @ Reds | 1–10 | Purkey (14–2) | Johnson (4–11) | – | 6,936 | 33–47 |
| 82 | July 8 | @ Reds | 8–12 | Maloney (4–3) | Farrell (5–9) | – | 18,332 | 33–48 |
| 83 | July 8 | @ Reds | 11–12 (13) | O'Toole (8–9) | Farrell (5–10) | – | 18,332 | 33–49 |
| 84 | July 11 | @ Phillies | 1–6 | Mahaffey (11–9) | Woodeshick (3–7) | – | 3,441 | 33–50 |
| 85 | July 12 | @ Pirates | 4–6 | McBean (9–5) | Golden (5–8) | – | 14,784 | 33–51 |
| 86 | July 13 | @ Pirates | 0–4 | Friend (9–9) | Farrell (5–11) | – | 15,376 | 33–52 |
| 87 | July 14 | @ Pirates | 2–4 | Law (8–4) | Bruce (6–3) | - | 7,343 | 33–53 |
| 88 | July 15 | Cubs | 5–4 | Woodeshick (4–7) | Buhl (6–7) | McMahon (3) | 6,907 | 34–53 |
| 89 | July 15 | Cubs | 1–4 | Ellsworth (5–13) | Johnson (4–12) | – | 6,907 | 34–54 |
| 90 | July 17 | Phillies | 0–3 | Hamilton (6–7) | Kemmerer (0–1) | Baldschun (9) | 8,115 | 34–55 |
| 91 | July 17 | Phillies | 2–8 | McLish (6–2) | Farrell (5–12) | Bennett (1) | 8,115 | 34–56 |
| 92 | July 18 | Phillies | 2–6 | Green (3–2) | Bruce (6–4) | – | 5,140 | 34–57 |
| 93 | July 19 | Phillies | 2–6 | Short (5–6) | Woodeshick (4–8) | Baldschun (10) | 5,017 | 34–58 |
| 94 | July 20 | Cardinals | 4–3 | Farrell (6–12) | McDaniel (2–5) | – | 15,422 | 35–58 |
| 95 | July 21 | Cardinals | 0–7 | Jackson (9–8) | Kemmerer (0–2) | – | 17,742 | 35–59 |
| 96 | July 21 | Cardinals | 7–3 | Johnson (5–12) | Simmons (8–6) | Golden (1) | 17,742 | 36–59 |
| 97 | July 22 | Cardinals | 1–3 | Gibson (13–6) | Bruce (6–5) | McDaniel (11) | 8,685 | 36–60 |
| 98 | July 23 | Giants | 1–5 | Bolin (6–0) | Woodeshick (4–9) | – | 12,096 | 36–61 |
| 99 | July 24 | Giants | 1–3 | Sanford (13–6) | Farrell (6–13) | Larsen (6) | 11,289 | 36–62 |
| 100 | July 25 | Giants | 2–3 | O'Dell (12–8) | Golden (5–9) | Miller (14) | 12,344 | 36–63 |
| 101 | July 27 | @ Cubs | 1–5 | Ellsworth (6–14) | Woodeshick (4–10) | – | 6,111 | 36–64 |
| 102 | July 29 | @ Cubs | 2–4 | Koonce (9–3) | Golden (5–10) | Cardwell (2) | 10,334 | 36–65 |
| 103 | July 29 | @ Cubs | 3–1 | Farrell (7–13) | Hobbie (3–10) | – | 10,334 | 37–65 |

August 1962 (12–19)

| # | Date | Opponent | Score | Win | Loss | Save | Attendance | Record |
|---|---|---|---|---|---|---|---|---|
| 104 | August 1 | @ Braves | 0–3 | Shaw (12–8) | Woodeshick (4–11) | – | 10,829 | 37–66 |
| 105 | August 2 | @ Braves | 3–0 | Farrell (8–13) | Burdette (8–7) | – | 8.338 | 38–66 |
| 106 | August 3 | @ Cardinals | 8–3 | Johnson (6–12) | Gibson (13–8) | McMahon (4) | 11,853 | 39–66 |
| 107 | August 4 | @ Cardinals | 0–2 | Washburn (10–5) | Bruce (6–6) | – | 9,390 | 39–67 |
| 108 | August 5 | @ Cardinals | 7–4 | Kemmerer (1–2) | McDaniel (2–6) | McMahon (5) | 14,954 | 40–67 |
| 109 | August 5 | @ Cardinals | 4–7 | Toth (1–0) | Woodeshick (4–12) | – | 14,954 | 40–68 |
| 110 | August 6 | Reds | 0–1 (13) | Klippstein (4–2) | McMahon (2–3) | – | 8,507 | 40–69 |
| 111 | August 7 | Reds | 0–3 | Jay (17–9) | Johnson (6–13) | – | 6,523 | 40–70 |
| 112 | August 8 | Reds | 0–4 | Nuxhall (2–0) | Bruce (6–7) | Brosnan (8) | 7,350 | 40–71 |
| 113 | August 9 | Reds | 3–7 | O'Toole (12–12) | Woodeshick (4–13) | – | 5,196 | 40–72 |
| 114 | August 10 | Braves | 6–7 | Spahn (12–11) | Brunet (0–1) | Raymond (5) | 7,047 | 40–73 |
| 115 | August 11 | Braves | 1–3 | Shaw (14–8) | Farrell (8–14) | Raymond (6) | 14,630 | 40–74 |
| 116 | August 12 | Braves | 8–5 | Bruce (7–7) | Burdette (9–8) | Kemmerer (1) | 4,902 | 41–74 |
| 117 | August 14 | Cardinals | 4–3 (10) | McMahon (3–3) | Gibson (14–9) | – | 9,604 | 42–74 |
| 118 | August 15 | Cardinals | 3–1 | Woodeshick (5–13) | Washburn (10–6) | Kemmerer (2) | 8,843 | 43–74 |
| 119 | August 16 | Cardinals | 1–3 | Jackson (10–10) | Farrell (8–15) | – | 9,159 | 43–75 |
| 120 | August 17 | Cubs | 3–2 | Kemmerer (2–2) | Anderson (2–6) | – | 6,539 | 44–75 |
| 121 | August 18 | Cubs | 2–1 | Brunet (1–1) | Koonce (9–6) | – | 12,243 | 45–75 |
| 122 | August 18 | Cubs | 5–6 | Elston (4–7) | McMahon (3–4) | Cardwell (4) | 12,243 | 45–76 |
| 123 | August 19 | Cubs | 3–4 | Buhl (9–9) | Woodeshick (5–14) | Anderson (4) | 4,543 | 45–77 |
| 124 | August 20 | @ Phillies | 1–7 | Green (6–5) | Farrell (8–16) | – | 14,601 | 45–78 |
| 125 | August 21 | @ Phillies | 3–5 | Mahaffey (17–10) | Bruce (7–8) | – | 5,489 | 45–79 |
| 126 | August 21 | @ Phillies | 4–7 | Hamilton (7–11) | Golden (5–11) | – | 5,489 | 45–80 |
| 127 | August 22 | @ Pirates | 0–3 | Sturdivant (6–3) | Brunet (1–2) | – | 10,553 | 45–81 |
| 128 | August 23 | @ Pirates | 0–4 | Law (10–6) | Johnson (6–14) | – | 10,742 | 45–82 |
| 129 | August 24 | @ Reds | 2–4 | Purkey (20–4) | Woodeshick (5–15) | – | 18,879 | 45–83 |
| 130 | August 25 | @ Reds | 6–7 | Jay (20–10) | Farrell (8–17) | Brosnan (10) | 12,680 | 45–84 |
| 131 | August 26 | @ Reds | 2–1 | Brunet (2–2) | Maloney (8–5) | – | 25,808 | 46–84 |
| 132 | August 26 | @ Reds | 6–4 | McMahon (4–4) | Wills (0–2) | Umbricht (1) | 25,808 | 47–84 |
| 133 | August 28 | @ Cardinals | 4–2 | Bruce (8–8) | Broglio (10–7) | McMahon (6) | 9,510 | 48–84 |
| 134 | August 29 | @ Cardinals | 3–2 | Farrell (9–17) | Gibson (15–10) | – | 8,295 | 49–84 |

September 1962 (15–12)

| # | Date | Opponent | Score | Win | Loss | Save | Attendance | Record |
|---|---|---|---|---|---|---|---|---|
| 135 | September 1 | @ Cubs | 3–4 | Ellsworth (8–17) | McMahon (4–5) | Schultz (3) | 9,887 | 49–85 |
| 136 | September 2 | @ Cubs | 3–1 | McMahon (5–5) | Buhl (10–10) | – | 13,088 | 50–85 |
| 137 | September 3 | Phillies | 2–3 | Mahaffey (18–11) | Farrell (9–18) | – | 17,302 | 50–86 |
| 138 | September 3 | Phillies | 3–5 | Hamilton (8–11) | Woodeshick (5–16) | Bennett (3) | 17,302 | 50–87 |
| 139 | September 4 | Phillies | 4–1 | Bruce (9–8) | McLish (9–5) | – | 4,537 | 51–87 |
| 140 | September 5 | Pirates | 5–3 | Umbricht (1–0) | Law (10–7) | McMahon (7) | 4,593 | 52–87 |
| 141 | September 6 | Pirates | 4–3 | Kemmerer (3–2) | Face (8–7) | – | 5,196 | 53–87 |
| 142 | September 7 | Pirates | 4–2 | Golden (6–11) | Jackson (8–18) | McMahon (8) | 6,208 | 54–87 |
| 143 | September 8 | Mets | 4–3 | Kemmerer (4–2) | Anderson (3–17) | – | 1,638 | 55–87 |
| 144 | September 8 | Mets | 6–5 (10) | Umbricht (2–0) | Craig (7–23) | – | 6,568 | 56–87 |
| 145 | September 9 | Mets | 7–7 (8) | – | – | – | 3,630 | 56–87 |
| 146 | September 12 | Dodgers | 0–1 | Roebuck (10–0) | Johnson (6–15) | Perranoski (19) | 28,669 | 56–88 |
| 147 | September 14 | @ Braves | 1–3 | Hendley (11–12) | Farrell (9–19) | – | 5,505 | 56–89 |
| 148 | September 15 | @ Braves | 8–9 | Nottebart (2–2) | Kemmerer (4–3) | – | 6,872 | 56–90 |
| 149 | September 16 | @ Braves | 4–5 | Burdette (10–9) | McMahon (5–6) | – | 5,477 | 56–91 |
| 150 | September 18 | @ Mets | 6–2 | Johnson (7–15) | Jackson (8–19) | – | 3,670 | 57–91 |
| 151 | September 18 | @ Mets | 8–6 | Drott (1–0) | Foss (0–1) | Umbricht (2) | 3,670 | 58–91 |
| 152 | September 20 | @ Mets | 7–2 | Golden (7–11) | Hook (8–18) | Kemmerer (3) | 1,481 | 59–91 |
| 153 | September 20 | @ Mets | 5–4 (12) | Kemmerer (5–3) | Daviault (1–5) | – | 1,481 | 60–91 |
| 154 | September 21 | Giants | 5–11 | Perry (3–1) | Brunet (2–3) | Miller (18) | 12,180 | 60–92 |
| 155 | September 22 | Giants | 6–5 | Umbricht (3–0) | Miller (4–8) | – | 17,125 | 61–92 |
| 156 | September 23 | Giants | 3–10 | O'Dell (19–13) | Bruce (9–9) | – | 9,623 | 61–93 |
| 157 | September 25 | @ Dodgers | 3–2 (10) | Farrell (10–19) | Roebuck (10–1) | – | 25,036 | 62–93 |
| 158 | September 26 | @ Dodgers | 1–13 | Podres (15–12) | Brunet (2–4) | L. Sherry (11) | 25,813 | 62–94 |
| 159 | September 27 | @ Dodgers | 8–6 | Umbricht (4–0) | Perranoski (6–5) | – | 29,855 | 63–94 |
| 160 | September 29 | @ Giants | 5–11 | Sanford (24–7) | Johnson (7–16) | Miller (19) | 26,268 | 63–95 |
| 161 | September 29 | @ Giants | 4–2 | Bruce (10–9) | Marichal (18–11) | – | 26,268 | 64–95 |
| 162 | September 30 | @ Giants | 1–2 | Miller (5–8) | Farrell (10–20) | – | 41,327 | 64–96 |

== Player statistics ==
Table legend
| League leader (Bold: MLB leader) | Team leader | * | Left-handed batter or pitcher |
| League top ten | Leader in appearances at position | # | Switch hitter |

=== Batting ===
Abbreviations key

- ⌖ — primary position
- G — games played
- PA — plate appearances
- AB — at bats
- R — runs
- H — hits
- 2B — doubles
- HR — home runs
- RBI — runs batted in
- BB — base on balls
- SB — stolen bases
- TB — total bases
- AVG — batting average
- OBP — on-base percentage
- SLG — slugging percentage
- OPS — on-base plus slugging

==== Starters by position ====
Individual batting results
| ⌖ | Player | G | AB | R | H | 2B | 3B | HR | RBI | SB | BB | AVG | OBP | SLG | OPS |
|---|---|---|---|---|---|---|---|---|---|---|---|---|---|---|---|
| C | Hal Smith | 109 | 345 | 32 | 81 | 14 | 0 | 12 | 35 | 0 | 24 | .235 | .286 | .380 | .666 |
| 1B | Norm Larker* | 147 | 506 | 58 | 133 | 19 | 5 | 9 | 63 | 1 | 70 | .263 | .358 | .374 | .732 |
| 2B | Joey Amalfitano | 117 | 380 | 44 | 90 | 12 | 5 | 1 | 27 | 4 | 45 | .237 | .317 | .303 | .620 |
| 3B | Bob Aspromonte | 149 | 534 | 59 | 142 | 18 | 4 | 11 | 59 | 4 | 46 | .266 | .332 | .376 | .708 |
| SS | Bob Lillis | 129 | 457 | 38 | 114 | 12 | 4 | 1 | 30 | 7 | 28 | .249 | .292 | .300 | .591 |
| LF | Al Spangler* | 129 | 418 | 51 | 119 | 10 | 9 | 5 | 35 | 7 | 70 | .285 | .389 | .388 | .777 |
| CF | Carl Warwick | 130 | 477 | 63 | 124 | 17 | 1 | 16 | 60 | 2 | 38 | .260 | .312 | .400 | .712 |
| RF | Román Mejías | 146 | 566 | 82 | 162 | 12 | 3 | 24 | 76 | 12 | 30 | .286 | .326 | .445 | .771 |

==== Other batters ====
Individual batting results
| Player | G | AB | R | H | 2B | 3B | AVG | HR | RBI | SB |
|---|---|---|---|---|---|---|---|---|---|---|
| Jim Pendleton | 117 | 321 | 30 | 79 | 12 | 2 | .246 | 8 | 36 | 0 |
| Merritt Ranew* | 71 | 218 | 26 | 51 | 6 | 8 | .234 | 4 | 24 | 2 |
| Billy Goodman* | 82 | 161 | 12 | 41 | 4 | 1 | .255 | 0 | 10 | 0 |
| J. C. Hartman | 51 | 148 | 11 | 33 | 5 | 0 | .223 | 0 | 5 | 1 |
| Pidge Browne* | 65 | 100 | 8 | 21 | 4 | 2 | .210 | 1 | 10 | 0 |
| Johnny Temple | 31 | 95 | 14 | 25 | 4 | 0 | .263 | 0 | 12 | 1 |
| Jim Campbell | 27 | 86 | 6 | 19 | 4 | 0 | .221 | 3 | 6 | 0 |
| Don Buddin | 40 | 80 | 10 | 13 | 4 | 1 | .163 | 2 | 10 | 0 |
| Al Heist | 27 | 72 | 4 | 16 | 1 | 0 | .222 | 0 | 3 | 0 |
| Dave Roberts* | 16 | 53 | 3 | 13 | 3 | 0 | .245 | 1 | 10 | 0 |
| Bob Cerv | 19 | 31 | 2 | 7 | 0 | 0 | .226 | 2 | 3 | 0 |
| Johnny Weekly | 13 | 26 | 3 | 5 | 1 | 0 | .192 | 2 | 2 | 0 |
| Don Taussig | 16 | 25 | 1 | 5 | 0 | 0 | .200 | 1 | 1 | 0 |
| Dick Gernert | 10 | 24 | 1 | 5 | 0 | 0 | .208 | 0 | 1 | 0 |
| Ron Davis} | 6 | 14 | 1 | 3 | 0 | 0 | .214 | 0 | 1 | 1 |
| Ernie Fazio | 12 | 12 | 3 | 1 | 0 | 0 | .083 | 0 | 1 | 0 |
| Jim Busby | 15 | 11 | 2 | 2 | 0 | 0 | .182 | 0 | 1 | 0 |
| George Williams | 5 | 8 | 1 | 3 | 1 | 0 | .375 | 0 | 2 | 0 |

=== Pitching ===
Abbreviations key

- W — wins
- L — losses
- ERA — earned run average
- G — games pitched
- GS — games started
- CG — complete games
- ShO — shutouts
- SV — saves
- IP — innings pitched
- SO — strikeouts

==== Starting pitchers ====
Individual pitching results
| Player | G | GS | IP | W | L | ERA | R | ER | BB | SO | SO/BB |
|---|---|---|---|---|---|---|---|---|---|---|---|
| Turk Farrell | 43 | 29 | 241.2 | 10 | 20 | 3.02 | 91 | 81 | 55 | 203 | 3.69 |
| Ken Johnson | 33 | 31 | 197.0 | 7 | 16 | 3.84 | 100 | 84 | 46 | 178 | **3.87** |
| Bob Bruce | 32 | 27 | 175.0 | 10 | 9 | 4.06 | 92 | 79 | 82 | 135 | 1.65 |
| Hal Woodeshick* | 31 | 26 | 139.1 | 5 | 16 | 4.39 | 84 | 68 | 54 | 82 | 1.52 |
| Bobby Shantz* | 3 | 3 | 20.2 | 1 | 1 | 1.31 | 4 | 3 | 5 | 14 | 2.80 |

==== Other pitchers ====
Individual pitching results
| Player | G | GS | IP | W | L | SV | ERA | R | ER | BB | K |
|---|---|---|---|---|---|---|---|---|---|---|---|
| Jim Golden | 37 | 18 | 152.2 | 7 | 11 | 1 | 4.07 | 84 | 69 | 50 | 88 |
| Dave Giusti | 22 | 5 | 73.2 | 2 | 3 | 0 | 5.62 | 49 | 46 | 30 | 43 |
| George Brunet* | 17 | 11 | 54.0 | 2 | 4 | 0 | 4.50 | 31 | 27 | 21 | 36 |
| Dean Stone* | 15 | 7 | 52.1 | 3 | 2 | 0 | 4.47 | 31 | 26 | 20 | 31 |
| Red Witt | 8 | 2 | 15.1 | 0 | 2 | 0 | 7.04 | 14 | 12 | 9 | 10 |
| Dick Drott | 6 | 1 | 13.0 | 1 | 0 | 0 | 7.62 | 12 | 11 | 9 | 10 |

==== Relief pitchers ====
Individual pitching results
| Player | G | IP | W | L | SV | ERA | R | ER | BB | K |
|---|---|---|---|---|---|---|---|---|---|---|
| Don McMahon | 51 | 76.2 | 5 | 5 | 8 | 1.53 | 14 | 13 | 33 | 69 |
| Bobby Tiefenauer | 43 | 85.0 | 2 | 4 | 1 | 4.34 | 42 | 41 | 21 | 60 |
| Russ Kemmerer | 36 | 68.0 | 5 | 3 | 3 | 4.10 | 34 | 31 | 15 | 23 |
| Jim Umbricht | 34 | 67.0 | 4 | 0 | 2 | 2.01 | 19 | 15 | 17 | 55 |
| John Anderson | 10 | 17.2 | 0 | 0 | 0 | 5.09 | 12 | 10 | 3 | 6 |
| Al Cicotte | 5 | 4.2 | 0 | 0 | 0 | 3.86 | 4 | 2 | 1 | 4 |

== Awards and achievements ==
=== Grand slams ===
| No. | Date | Astros batter | Venue | Inning | Pitcher | Opposing team | Box |
|---|---|---|---|---|---|---|---|
| 1 | June 10 (Note: Game 2 of doubleheader) | Don Buddin | Colt Stadium | 6 | Joe Moeller | Los Angeles Dodgers | |
| 2 | June 20 | Norm Larker | Candlestick Park | 3 (Note: Tied score or took lead) | Juan Marichal | San Francisco Giants | |

=== Awards ===
1962 Houston Colt .45s award winners
| Name of award | | | Recipient | Ref. |
|---|---|---|---|---|
| Houston Colt .45s Most Valuable Player (MVP) | | | Bob Lillis | |
| Gold Glove Award | | Pitcher | Bobby Shantz | |
| MLB All-Star | Reserve pitcher | Game 1 | Turk Farrell | |
| MLB All-Star | Reserve pitcher | Game 2 | Turk Farrell | |

=== League leaders ===
==== All players ====
1962 NL leaders
| Category | Player | Figure | Rank |
|---|---|---|---|
| Wins Above Replacement (WAR)—all (Note: Per Baseball-Reference.com.) | Turk Farrell | 7.3 | 4th |

==== Batting ====
1962 NL batting leaders
| Category | Player | Figure | Rank |
|---|---|---|---|
| At bats per strikeout | Norm Larker | 10.8 | 10th |
| Bases on balls (BB) | Al Spangler | 70 | 10th |
| Bases on balls (BB) | Norm Larker | 70 | 10th |
| Hit by pitch (HBP) | Bob Aspromonte | 8 | 5th |
| Hit by pitch (HBP) | Norm Larker | 7 | 8th |
| Power–speed number | Román Mejías | 16.0 | 9th |
| Sacrifice hits (SH) | Ken Johnson | 9 | 10th |
| Stolen base percentage | Román Mejías | 75.0 | 7th |
| Triples (3B) | Al Spangler | 9 | 5th |

==== Pitching ====
1962 NL pitching leaders
| Category | Player | Figure | Rank |
|---|---|---|---|
| WAR—pitching | Turk Farrell | 7.0 | 2nd |
| Earned run average (ERA) | Turk Farrell | 3.02 | 2nd |
| Bases on balls per nine innings (BB/9) | Turk Farrell | 2.048 | 6th |
| Bases on balls per nine innings (BB/9) | Ken Johnson | 2.102 | 7th |
| Fielding independent pitching (FIP) | Ken Johnson | 2.80 | 2nd |
| Fielding independent pitching (FIP) | Turk Farrell | 2.81 | 3rd |
| Hits per nine innings (H/9) | Turk Farrell | 7.821 | 6th |
| Strikeout-to-walk ratio (K/BB) | Ken Johnson | 3.870 | 1st (Note: MLB leader.) |
| Strikeout-to-walk ratio (K/BB) | Turk Farrell | 3.691 | 3rd |
| Strikeouts (SO or K) | Turk Farrell | 203 | 4th |
| Strikeouts (SO or K) | Ken Johnson | 178 | 6th |
| Walks plus hits per inning pitched (WHIP) | Turk Farrell | 1.097 | 2nd |

== Minor league system ==
=== 1962 minor league affiliates ===
| Level | Team | League | Manager |
|---|---|---|---|
| AAA | Oklahoma City 89ers | American Association | Connie Ryan |
| B | Durham Bulls | Carolina League | Lou Fitzgerald |
| C | Modesto Colts | California League | Fred Hatfield |
| D | Moultrie Colt .22s | Georgia–Florida League | Jim Walton |
