= Pidge Browne =

American baseball player (1929-1997)

- First baseman
- Born: March 21, 1929; Peekskill, New York, U.S.
- Died: June 3, 1997 (aged 68); Houston, Texas, U.S.
- Batted: Left Threw: Left

MLB debut
- April 13, 1962, for the Houston Colt .45s

Last MLB appearance
- July 29, 1962, for the Houston Colt .45s

MLB statistics
- Batting average: .210
- Home runs: 1
- Runs batted in: 10
- Stats at Baseball Reference

Teams
- Houston Colt .45s (1962)

Prentice Almont "Pidge" Browne Jr. (March 21, 1929 – June 3, 1997) was an American professional baseball player. A first baseman, he was a longtime minor league star who had a half-season trial in Major League Baseball in 1962 in his 13th and final professional season at the age of 33. That year, as a member of the first-ever Houston Colt .45s squad, he participated in another unusual feat, representing a Houston-based professional baseball team at three different levels — Double-A (with the 1956–57 Houston Buffaloes of the Texas League), Triple-A (with the 1959 and 1961 Buffs of the American Association) and MLB (with the 1962 Colt .45s, known as the Astros since 1965).

Browne was from Peekskill, New York and attended Peekskill High School, where he dropped out in May 1946 to join the United States Navy. He served for two years.

He threw and batted left-handed, stood 6 feet 1 inch (1.85 m) tall and weighed 190 pounds (86 kg). He spent much of his minor league career in the farm system of the St. Louis Cardinals and belted 190 home runs over the course of his 13 years in the minors. His two best seasons occurred back to back in the Texas League, when he hit 33 home runs for the 1955 Shreveport Sports, an unaffiliated team, then 29 more homers in 1956 for the Cardinals' Houston Buffaloes affiliate.

Acquired by the Colt .45s for their first season in the National League, he made his debut on April 19, 1962, as a pinch hitter for pitcher Turk Farrell; batting against Jack Hamilton of the Philadelphia Phillies, Browne grounded out to second baseman Tony Taylor. Six days later, Browne started at first base for Houston against the Chicago Cubs and got his first MLB hit, a triple off Don Cardwell. He would appear in 65 games played for the Colt .45s through the end of July, 15 as a starting player. His best day came May 6 on the road against the Milwaukee Braves, when Browne had three hits, including his only Major League home run, in five at bats and scored three runs in a 9–1 Houston win. He was sent to the Triple-A Oklahoma City 89ers to finish the 1962 season, and he retired at the end of that campaign.

Browne worked in the freight business after his retirement from baseball, and died in Houston at age 68 in 1997. He is buried at Earthman Resthaven Cemetery in Houston.
