= Al Spangler =

American baseball player (born 1933)

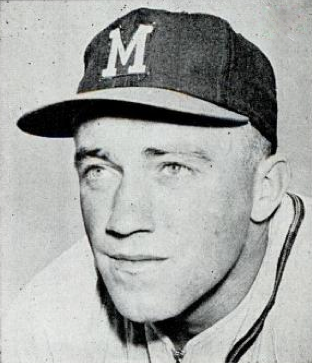
- Spangler in 1961
- Outfielder
- Born: July 8, 1933 (age 93); Philadelphia, Pennsylvania, U.S.
- Batted: Left Threw: Left

MLB debut
- September 16, 1959, for the Milwaukee Braves

Last MLB appearance
- September 11, 1971, for the Chicago Cubs

MLB statistics
- Batting average: .262
- Home runs: 21
- Runs batted in: 175
- Stats at Baseball Reference

Teams
- Milwaukee Braves (1959–1961); Houston Colt .45s / Astros (1962–1965); Los Angeles / California Angels (1965–1966); Chicago Cubs (1967–1971)

Career highlights and awards
- Drove in first run in Houston Colt .45s history.

Albert Donald Spangler (born July 8, 1933) is an American former Major League Baseball outfielder and coach. Spangler appeared in 912 games in the majors between 1959 and 1971 for the Milwaukee Braves, Houston Colt .45s / Astros, Los Angeles / California Angels, and Chicago Cubs. Born in Philadelphia, he threw and batted left-handed, and was listed as 6 feet (1.8 m) tall and 175 pounds (79 kg).

== High school and college career ==
Spangler, nicknamed "Spanky", attended Philadelphia's Olney High School. After turning down a professional contract offer from the Chicago White Sox, he was slated to attend Lafayette College in Easton, Pennsylvania, with a full scholarship, but decided to attend Duke University. He was an All-American college selection after his junior year as Blue Devil, thanks to his .406 batting average.

== Professional career ==
1962 picture pack card of Spangler for Houston Colt .45s

Not quite four weeks before his 21st birthday, Spangler signed as a free agent with the Braves on June 14, 1954. He made his MLB debut on September 16, 1959, and would go on to play his final game on September 11, 1971.

After spending both 1960 and 1961 as a reserve outfielder for Milwaukee, Spangler was drafted by the Houston Colt .45s as a premium selection in the 1961 Major League Baseball expansion draft. He was the Colt .45s' starting center fielder in the club's first major-league game, played against the Cubs on April 10, 1962. Batting second in the order, he drove in the first run in franchise history with a RBI triple in the bottom of the first inning off Cubs' starting pitcher Don Cardwell, knocking in teammate Bob Aspromonte. His .285 mark during the Colt .45s' maiden season was second by .001 to fellow outfielder Román Mejías' .286, but the following year Spangler was the team's batting average leader at .281 in 120 games played.

After his hitting declined in both 1964 (.245) and 1965 (.214), Spangler was traded to the Angels on June 1, 1965. He appeared in only 57 games (starting 20) for the Angels over the next season and a half, and spent most of 1966 at Triple-A Seattle. Released by the Angels on February 13, 1967, Spangler signed with the Cubs as a free agent three days later. Although he spent part of 1967 and 1970 at Triple-A Tacoma, Spangler played the rest of his big-league tenure with the Cubs. On June 12, 1969, he hit two home runs and drove in four runs in a 12 to 6 victory over the Atlanta Braves.

The Cubs released Spangler as an active player after the 1970 season and named him to manager Leo Durocher's coaching staff for 1971. On August 30, 1971, he was added to the team's active list, and pinch hit five times during the month of September, garnering two hits. That brief stint concluded his MLB career. In his 912 games played, Spangler batted .262 with 21 career home runs and 175 runs batted in. His 594 hits also included 87 doubles and 26 triples.

Spangler remained with the Cubs' organization for another three seasons; he managed in their farm system in 1972 and 1973, then returned to their big-league coaching staff in 1974 for a final season.
