= Larker =

Larker may refer to:

- Norm Larker (1930–2007), American Major League baseball player
- a 6-rowed malting barley variety
