= Al Heist =

American baseball player (1927–2006)

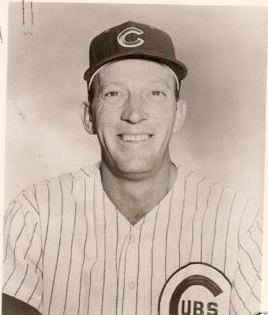
- Al Heist in 1961
- Outfielder
- Born: October 5, 1927; Brooklyn, New York, U.S.
- Died: October 2, 2006 (aged 78); Tahlequah, Oklahoma, U.S.
- Batted: Right Threw: Right

MLB debut
- July 17, 1960, for the Chicago Cubs

Last MLB appearance
- September 27, 1962, for the Houston Colt .45s

MLB statistics
- Batting average: .255
- Home runs: 8
- Runs batted in: 46
- Stats at Baseball Reference

Teams
- Chicago Cubs (1960–1961); Houston Colt .45s (1962)

Alfred Michael Heist (October 5, 1927 – October 2, 2006) was an American professional baseball player, coach and scout. After a long career in the Pacific Coast League of the 1950s, the outfielder made his Major League debut at the age of 32 and appeared in 177 big-league games for the Chicago Cubs (1960–61) and the Houston Colt .45s (1962). He threw and batted right-handed, stood 6 feet 2 inches (1.88 m) tall and weighed 185 pounds (84 kg).

Heist was born in Brooklyn, New York, and signed with the St. Louis Browns in 1949. Acquired by the top-level Sacramento Solons in 1955, he played almost six full seasons in California's capital before being traded to the Cubs on July 15, 1960. Two days later, he made his first Major League appearance, starting in center field against the St. Louis Cardinals and batting sixth in the lineup against right-hander Larry Jackson. In the seventh inning, he collected his first big-league hit, a single, one of four Chicago hits in a 6–0 shutout loss. He appeared in 41 games for the Cubs in 1960, then in 109 more games in 1961, starting 82 out of the team's 154 games played in center field, 26 more than the Cubs' former regular, Baseball Hall of Famer Richie Ashburn. On April 15, 1961, Heist hit a walk-off grand slam home run in the ninth inning at Wrigley Field against the Milwaukee Braves. That season, Heist batted .255 with seven home runs and 37 runs batted in.

After the campaign, he was Houston's fifth pick and the ninth overall selection in the 1961 Major League Baseball expansion draft. In the very first inning of the very first Colt .45 game, he stepped in a hole and broke his ankle. Heist would play just 23 games for the 1962 Colt .45s during their maiden season as Carl Warwick won the starting center field job. Heist then returned to Triple-A for three more seasons before becoming a coach on manager Grady Hatton's Houston Astros staff in 1966–67. He later served as a scout for the Astros, Cubs, San Diego Padres and San Francisco Giants, with one season back in uniform as a coach for Padre manager Jerry Coleman in 1980.

As a Major Leaguer, Heist registered 126 hits, including 20 doubles, six triples and eight home runs. He died in Tahlequah, Oklahoma, at the age of 78.
