= Bob Aspromonte =

American baseball player (born 1938)

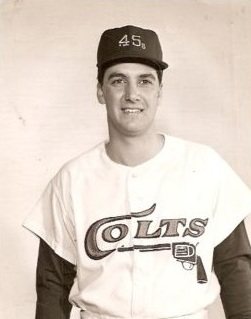
- Aspromonte in 1962
- Third baseman
- Born: June 19, 1938 (age 88); Brooklyn, New York, U.S.
- Batted: Right Threw: Right

MLB debut
- September 19, 1956, for the Brooklyn Dodgers

Last MLB appearance
- September 28, 1971, for the New York Mets

MLB statistics
- Batting average: .252
- Home runs: 60
- Runs batted in: 457
- Stats at Baseball Reference

Teams
- Brooklyn / Los Angeles Dodgers (1956, 1960–1961); Houston Colt .45s / Astros (1962–1968); Atlanta Braves (1969–1970); New York Mets (1971)

Career highlights and awards
- Houston Astros Hall of Fame

Robert Thomas Aspromonte (born June 19, 1938) is an American former professional baseball player and business entrepreneur. He played as a third baseman in Major League Baseball in 1956 and then from 1960 to 1971, most prominently as a member of the newly formed Houston Colt .45s expansion team, where he became the regular third baseman for the franchise's first seven seasons ( the team was later renamed the Astros). As well as being the first-ever batter for Houston, he was also the last Brooklyn Dodger to appear in a major league game. He also played for the Atlanta Braves and New York Mets in addition to the Brooklyn/Los Angeles Dodgers.

After his athletic career, he became a businessman in Houston, Texas. In 2019, Aspromonte was among the inaugural class of inductees to the Houston Astros Hall of Fame. In 2005 he was inducted into the Texas Baseball Hall of Fame and in 2011, he was elected to the National Italian American Sports Hall of Fame. He is the younger brother of former MLB player and manager Ken Aspromonte.

== Playing career ==
=== Early career ===
Aspromonte was born in Brooklyn, New York and grew up in Bensonhurst, Brooklyn, where he graduated from Lafayette High School. He made his professional debut in the Class A Southern League. In September 1956, the pennant-bound Dodgers placed him on their roster. On September 19, during a 17–2 win over the St. Louis Cardinals at Ebbets Field, Aspromonte made his MLB debut at age 18, striking out as a pinch hitter for Sandy Amoros in the eighth inning. It was Aspromonte's lone appearance in a Brooklyn uniform: he spent the next three seasons in minor league baseball before making the 1960 Los Angeles Dodgers roster out of spring training. On May 5, 1960, his four hits in five at bats, including his first major league home run (off Lew Burdette), led the Dodgers to a come-from-behind win over their rival, the Milwaukee Braves. However, he spent most of the 1960 season in Triple-A, where he batted .329 in the American Association.

The following year, 1961, was Aspromonte's first full season in the major leagues. He appeared in 47 games, starting two at third base and three at shortstop, and he hit .241 with two runs batted in in 62 plate appearances.

=== Houston Colt .45s/Astros (1962–1968) ===
The Dodgers exposed Aspromonte to the 1961 Major League Baseball expansion draft, and he was selected by the Houston Colt .45s with their second selection, the third player taken overall. In his limited playing time with the Dodgers he had been used as a shortstop, but with Houston he was moved to third base (with token work at shortstop and in the outfield). Aspromonte was the starting third baseman for the Houston franchise (renamed the Astros in 1965) for its first six seasons. On April 10, 1962, Aspromonte, playing third base and batting in the leadoff position, became the first batter in Houston's MLB history as the team hosted the Chicago Cubs at Colt Stadium. He singled to left field off Don Cardwell for the club's first hit, then scored its first-ever MLB run when the next batter, Al Spangler, tripled. Aspromonte scored twice more that day, as the Colt .45s beat the Cubs, 11–2. Aspromonte set a National League (NL) record among third basemen with a 57-game error-free streak that ended in the first game of a doubleheader on September 20 against the New York Mets. For the season, he played in 149 games, batting .266/.332/.376 (batting average/OBP/SLG) with 142 hits, 11 home runs, 59 RBIs, 54 strikeouts and 46 walks. He was 2nd in fielding percentage with .967, the first of six consecutive seasons in which he finished in the top five in the National League; he also finished in the top five in putouts and assists.

The following year, Aspromonte and Spangler were the only players from the Colts' inaugural Opening Day lineup to start the second season's opener. On May 12, he hit his first career walk-off home run, off Bob Buhl of the Cubs. On June 11, Aspromonte promised a little leaguer who was recovering in Houston from a lightning strike that he would hit a home run. Later that day he hit a home run against the Cubs; it was the first walk-off grand slam in franchise history, his first career grand slam, and the first of three he would hit against the Cubs. (Note: Aspromnonte totaled three walk-off home runs during his career—all against the Cubs.) Aspromonte played in 136 games, batting .214/.276/.306 with 100 hits, 49 RBIs, 57 strikeouts and 40 walks, and finished 4th in fielding percentage with .938.

Aspromonte hit the final grand slam at Colt Stadium on June 29, 1964, making him the first player in club history to hit two grand slams in the same month. (Note: Aspromnonte repeated the multi-grand slams in one month feat next for the Astros in August 1966 , which remained the team record until Alex Bregman hit three in June 2023.) At that point, Aspromonte had hit four of the first seven grand slams in Colts' team history. In 1964 he played a career-high 157 games, batting .280/.329/.721 with career highs of 155 hits and 69 RBIs, along with 54 strikeouts and 35 walks; his.973 fielding percentage was a career best and led the league . Aspromonte was the club's all-time home run leader at Colt Stadium, its home for its first three seasons, with 21.

Aspromonte's performance declined slightly in 1965, the team's first year at the Astrodome. He was one of the outs in the first triple play turned against the Colt .45s/Astros, by the Mets. Aspromonte hit .263/.310/.322 in 152 games, with 152 hits, 52 RBIs, 54 strikeouts and 38 walks, and finished 2nd in fielding percentage with .962.

He played 152 games during the 1966 season, batting .252/.297/.334 with 141 hits, 52 RBIs, a career- high 63 strikeouts and 35 walks, and led the NL in fielding percentage with .962. In August, he again hit two grand slams in the same month, tying his own club record; one of them was his second career walk-off grand slam, again against Chicago. As of 2025, Aspromonte remained the only hitter to hit two walk-off grand slams for Houston.

In 1967, Aspromonte played in fewer games (137), but set career highs with a .294/.354/.401 batting line, along with 143 hits, 58 RBIs, 45 walks and 44 strikeouts; his .963 fielding percentage ranked 3rd in the NL.

In 1968, Aspromonte started his seventh consecutive Opening Day, making him the only Colt .45/Astro to start each of Houston's first seven Opening Day games. He lost his starting third base job that year to Doug Rader. (Note: Another beacon of consistency, Rader later matched Aspromonte in Opening Day starts at third base in 1975, with seven.) Aspromonte still played in 124 games in 1968, including 75 at 3B, while batting .225/.285/.264 with 92 hits, 46 RBIs, 57 strikeouts and 35 walks. He stole the last base of his career on August 5. On June 9, he, along with teammate Rusty Staub and Maury Wills of the Pittsburgh Pirates, decided not to play in a game between the two teams following the assassination of Robert F. Kennedy three days earlier. Aspromonte stated: “If we didn’t put a day aside, it would hurt me. ... I’ve never had to take this firm a stand on anything before. It’s got to boil down to one thing: how you feel personally. It’s how I felt. My conscience is clear."

Of the 51 home runs Aspromonte hit for Houston, six were grand slams. This remained a team record until July 25, 2011, when it was surpassed by Carlos Lee. (Note: On April 9, 2004, Jeff Bagwell had tied Aspromnote's then-club record with his sixth career grand slam.)

=== Latter years (1968–1971) ===
He was traded to the Atlanta Braves on December 4 for Marty Martinez and played for them as a backup third baseman or utilityman. He played in 82 games while batting .253/.304/.348 with 24 RBIs, striking out 19 times and walking 13 times. In the ninth inning of the last regular season game against Cincinnati, with 47-year-old Hoyt Wilhelm pitching, he threw out the last runner of the game on a difficult play from shortstop to win by one as the Braves clinched the 1969 National League West. Aspromonte reached the postseason for the only time in his career with the 1969 National League Championship Series, where he went 0-for-3 as the Braves lost to the New York Mets in a three-game sweep. He played 62 games for the Braves in 1970, batting .213/.282/.236 with 13 strikeouts and walks each. On April 21, he recorded the 1,000th hit of his career, a single against Gary Nolan in the second inning in Atlanta. On December 1, he was traded from the Braves to the New York Mets for Ron Herbel. He started 93 games at third base for the 1971 Mets, twice as many as former regular Wayne Garrett. He played 104 games in total while batting .225/.285/.301 with 77 hits, 33 RBIs, 29 walks and 25 strikeouts, the second time in his career that he finished a season with more walks than strikeouts. In his final game, Aspromonte, the last Brooklyn Dodger to play in the major leagues, went hitless in three at bats, with an RBI, against the Cardinals' Steve Carlton at Shea Stadium.

== After baseball ==
Aspromonte collected 1,103 hits in his major league career, with 135 doubles, 26 triples and 60 home runs. He resides in Houston, Texas. On January 26, 2019, Aspromonte was announced as an inaugural member of the Houston Astros Hall of Fame; he was inducted on August 3, 2019.
