= 1961 Major League Baseball expansion draft =

Major League Baseball expansion draft

General information
- Sport: Baseball
- Date: October 10, 1961
- Location: Cincinnati, Ohio

Overview
- 45 (Note: An additional three selections were made in a supplemental draft held in October 1963.) total selections
- League: National League (Note: This draft was limited to National League teams; while the National League and American League are commonly referred to collectively as Major League Baseball, across many decades, Major League Baseball has only existed as a legal entity since 2000.)
- Expansion teams: Houston Colt .45s New York Mets
- Expansion season: 1962
- First selection: Eddie Bressoud (Houston Colt .45s)

The 1961 Major League Baseball expansion draft was held by Major League Baseball on October 10, 1961, to fill the rosters of the New York Mets and the Houston Colt .45s. (Note: The Houston Colt .45s were renamed as the Houston Astros in 1965, and moved to the American League in 2013.) These new franchises were set to enter the National League (NL) as part of the 1962 Major League Baseball expansion. Selections in the draft were limited to a pool of players designated by existing NL teams.

Due to the poor performance of the Mets and Colt .45s after two seasons, another draft was held for the teams on October 10, 1963. The other existing NL clubs made four players from their 40-man roster available at $30,000 apiece. A maximum of eight players could be selected between the two clubs. However, only three selections were made, two by New York and one by Houston.

== 1961 draft ==
1962 National League expansion teams

| All-Star |

Regular phase, $75,000 per player
| Pick | Player | Position | Selected by | Previous team |
|---|---|---|---|---|
| 1 | Eddie Bressoud | IF | Houston Colt .45s | San Francisco Giants |
| 2 | Hobie Landrith | C | New York Mets | San Francisco Giants |
| 3 | Bob Aspromonte | IF | Houston Colt .45s | Los Angeles Dodgers |
| 4 | Elio Chacón | IF | New York Mets | Cincinnati Reds |
| 5 | Bob Lillis | IF | Houston Colt .45s | St. Louis Cardinals |
| 6 | Roger Craig | P | New York Mets | Los Angeles Dodgers |
| 7 | Dick Drott | P | Houston Colt .45s | Chicago Cubs |
| 8 | Gus Bell* | OF | New York Mets | Cincinnati Reds |
| 9 | Al Heist | OF | Houston Colt .45s | Chicago Cubs |
| 10 | Joe Christopher | OF | New York Mets | Pittsburgh Pirates |
| 11 | Román Mejías | OF | Houston Colt .45s | Pittsburgh Pirates |
| 12 | Félix Mantilla | IF | New York Mets | Milwaukee Braves |
| 13 | George Williams | IF | Houston Colt .45s | Philadelphia Phillies |
| 14 | Gil Hodges* | 1B | New York Mets | Los Angeles Dodgers |
| 15 | Jesse Hickman | P | Houston Colt .45s | Philadelphia Phillies |
| 16 | Craig Anderson | P | New York Mets | St. Louis Cardinals |
| 17 | Merritt Ranew | C | Houston Colt .45s | Milwaukee Braves |
| 18 | Ray Daviault | P | New York Mets | San Francisco Giants |
| 19 | Don Taussig | OF | Houston Colt .45s | St. Louis Cardinals |
| 20 | John DeMerit | OF | New York Mets | Milwaukee Braves |
| 21 | Bobby Shantz* | P | Houston Colt .45s | Pittsburgh Pirates |
| 22 | Al Jackson | P | New York Mets | Pittsburgh Pirates |
| 23 | Norm Larker* | 1B | Houston Colt .45s | Los Angeles Dodgers |
| 24 | Sammy Drake | IF | New York Mets | Chicago Cubs |
| 25 | Sam Jones* | P | Houston Colt .45s | San Francisco Giants |
| 26 | Chris Cannizzaro | C | New York Mets | St. Louis Cardinals |
| 27 | Paul Roof | P | Houston Colt .45s | Milwaukee Braves |
| 28 | Choo-Choo Coleman | C | New York Mets | Philadelphia Phillies |
| 29 | Ken Johnson | P | Houston Colt .45s | Cincinnati Reds |
| 30 | Ed Bouchee | 1B | New York Mets | Chicago Cubs |
| 31 | Dick Gernert | 1B | Houston Colt .45s | Cincinnati Reds |
| 32 | Bob Smith | OF | New York Mets | Philadelphia Phillies |

Regular phase, $50,000 per player
| Pick | Player | Position | Selected by | Previous team |
|---|---|---|---|---|
| 33 | Ed Olivares | IF | Houston Colt .45s | St. Louis Cardinals |
| 34 | Sherman Jones | P | New York Mets | Cincinnati Reds |
| 35 | Jim Umbricht | P | Houston Colt .45s | Pittsburgh Pirates |
| 36 | Jim Hickman | OF | New York Mets | St. Louis Cardinals |
| 37 | Jim Golden | P | Houston Colt .45s | Los Angeles Dodgers |

Premium phase, $125,000 per player
| Pick | Player | Position | Selected by | Previous team |
|---|---|---|---|---|
| 38 | Joe Amalfitano | IF | Houston Colt .45s | San Francisco Giants |
| 39 | Jay Hook | P | New York Mets | Cincinnati Reds |
| 40 | Turk Farrell | P | Houston Colt .45s | Los Angeles Dodgers |
| 41 | Bob Miller | P | New York Mets | St. Louis Cardinals |
| 42 | Hal Smith | C | Houston Colt .45s | Pittsburgh Pirates |
| 43 | Don Zimmer* | IF | New York Mets | Chicago Cubs |
| 44 | Al Spangler | OF | Houston Colt .45s | Milwaukee Braves |
| 45 | Lee Walls* | IF/OF | New York Mets | Philadelphia Phillies |

* All-Star only before 1961 expansion draft

== 1963 draft ==
| All-Star |

Regular phase, $30,000 per player
| Player | Position | Selected by | Previous team |
|---|---|---|---|
| Bill Haas | 1B/OF | New York Mets | Los Angeles Dodgers |
| Claude Raymond | P | Houston Colt. 45s | Milwaukee Braves |
| Jack Fisher | P | New York Mets | San Francisco Giants |

== See also ==
- Continental League, a proposed third major league that had planned to begin play in the 1961 season
