= Don Buddin =

American baseball player (1934–2011)

- Shortstop
- Born: May 5, 1934; Turbeville, South Carolina, U.S.
- Died: June 30, 2011 (aged 77); Greenville, South Carolina, U.S.
- Batted: Right Threw: Right

MLB debut
- April 17, 1956, for the Boston Red Sox

Last MLB appearance
- September 25, 1962, for the Detroit Tigers

MLB statistics
- Batting average: .241
- Home runs: 41
- Runs batted in: 225
- Stats at Baseball Reference

Teams
- Boston Red Sox (1956, 1958–61); Houston Colt .45s (1962); Detroit Tigers (1962)

Donald Thomas Buddin (May 5, 1934 – June 30, 2011) was an American professional baseball shortstop. He played all or part of six seasons in Major League Baseball for the Boston Red Sox (1956, 1958–61), Houston Colt .45s (1962) and Detroit Tigers (1962). Listed at 5 ft 11 in (1.80 m), 178 pounds (81 kg), Buddin batted and threw right-handed. He was born in Turbeville, South Carolina.

== Early life ==
Buddin played high school baseball in Olanta, South Carolina, where he led his team to the state championship in 1953. Buddin led The American Legion Baseball Olanta, Sc Post 85 to the State Championship game in 1951 He was a highly touted prospect, and the Boston Red Sox won a bidding war for his services. He was signed by Red Sox scout Mace Brown for an estimated $50,000 bonus. At the time, Red Sox owner Tom Yawkey boasted that "Buddin can become one of the top ballplayers of his time". He attended nearby Wofford College for two years and joined the Red Sox prior to the 1956 season.

== Major League career ==
He became the Red Sox starting shortstop from 1956 through 1961, with the exception of the 1957 season, which he spent in military service. Buddin led the American League in errors by a shortstop in 1958 and 1959, and finished third and second in that category in 1956 and 1960. His defensive struggles led one Boston sportswriter to write that Buddin's car should bear the license plate "E-6," and the nickname "Bootin' Buddin," given by Red Sox fans. In 1959, the Red Sox bought infielder Pumpsie Green to compete for Buddin's job. With the promotion of Green, the Red Sox became the last team to integrate their roster.

Buddin's most productive season came in 1961, when he batted a career-high .263 in 109 games. He was traded that offseason to the expansion Colt .45s for fellow shortstop Eddie Bressoud.

Buddin was the starting shortstop in Houston's first official National League game on April 10, 1962 — an 11–2 victory against the visiting Chicago Cubs, in which he was hitless in three at bats but played errorless ball in the field and turned a double play. On June 11, he hit the first grand slam in Houston franchise history against Joe Moeller of the Los Angeles Dodgers. But he batted only .163 in 40 games, and Bob Lillis supplanted him as the Colt .45s regular shortstop. On July 20, Buddin's contract was waived to the Tigers, where he played out his final year in the Majors as a backup to Chico Fernández.

In a six-season MLB career, Buddin posted a .241 batting average with 551 hits and 41 home runs in 711 games, driving in 225 runs while scoring 342 times, committing 155 errors for a .954 fielding average. He also played seven minor league seasons between 1952 and 1965, most prominently in the International League and the Pacific Coast League circuits.

== Death ==
Buddin died in Greenville, South Carolina, at the age of 77 after having a long bout with cancer.
