= Jim Golden =

American baseball player (born 1936)

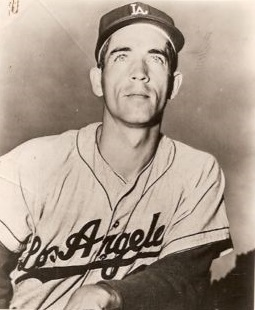
- Pitcher
- Born: March 20, 1936 (age 90); Eldon, Missouri, U.S.
- Batted: Left Threw: Right

MLB debut
- September 30, 1960, for the Los Angeles Dodgers

Last MLB appearance
- April 23, 1963, for the Houston Colt .45s

MLB statistics
- Win–loss record: 9–13
- Earned run average: 4.54
- Strikeouts: 115
- Stats at Baseball Reference

Teams
- Los Angeles Dodgers (1960–1961); Houston Colt .45s (1962–1963)

James Edward Golden (born March 20, 1936) is an American former pitcher in Major League Baseball, a right-hander who appeared in 69 games over all or parts of four seasons (1960–1963) for the Los Angeles Dodgers and Houston Colt .45s. Golden batted left-handed, stood 6 feet (1.8 m) tall and weighed 175 pounds (79 kg) in his playing days.

He graduated from high school in Silver Lake, Kansas, near Topeka, and signed with the Philadelphia Phillies at age 18 in 1954. He worked his way through the Phillies' minor league system for five seasons, but was never called to the majors. Finally, in December 1958, the Phils packaged him and two other players to Los Angeles in exchange for 24-year-old second baseman Sparky Anderson, then a prospect in the Dodger farm system but a future Baseball Hall of Fame manager. The Dodgers kept Golden at Triple-A St. Paul for two full campaigns before recalling him in the closing weeks of the 1960 campaign. He won 20 games for St. Paul in 1960, and led the American Association in both wins and earned run average (2.32).

Golden then spent the full seasons of 1961 and 1962 in the major leagues. He was a relief pitcher for the pennant-contending 1961 Dodgers, working in 28 games and posting a 1–1 record with no saves. Then he was selected by the brand-new Colt .45s as the 37th pick in the 1961 Major League Baseball expansion draft.

As a member of 1962 Colts, Golden appeared in 37 games, including 18 as a starting pitcher, and won seven of 18 decisions with an earned run average of 4.07. He was credited with five complete games and two shutouts, including a five-hitter against his old Dodger teammates on June 15, defeating that year's winner of the Cy Young Award, Hall of Famer Don Drysdale, 2–0. Five of Golden's wins came at the expense of Houston's fellow National League expansion entry, the New York Mets, who lost 120 games that season. His five complete games and two shutouts would be the only ones of his MLB career.

Golden worked in three early-season 1963 games for Houston, but he was roughed up in his final appearance, a start against the St. Louis Cardinals April 23; he allowed two earned runs in 21/3 innings pitched before being taken out of the contest. But the Colt .45 bullpen let the game get out of hand, surrendering 13 more runs as St. Louis triumphed, 15–0. Golden then spent the rest of 1963 and all of 1964 at Triple-A before retiring from baseball.

During his MLB career, Golden posted a 9–13 record and 4.54 career earned run average in 69 games pitched; he allowed 233 hits and 76 bases on balls, with 115 strikeouts, in 208 innings pitched. He appeared in another six MLB games as a pinch runner during the 1962 season. At the plate, he batted .217 with 13 hits, including three doubles and two triples, with eight runs batted in.
