= Carl Warwick =

American baseball player (1937–2025)

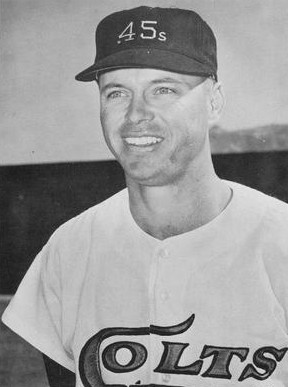
- Outfielder
- Born: February 27, 1937; Dallas, Texas, U.S.
- Died: April 5, 2025 (aged 88); Houston, Texas, U.S.
- Batted: Right Threw: Left

MLB debut
- April 11, 1961, for the Los Angeles Dodgers

Last MLB appearance
- June 12, 1966, for the Chicago Cubs

MLB statistics
- Batting average: .248
- Home runs: 31
- Runs batted in: 149
- Stats at Baseball Reference

Teams
- Los Angeles Dodgers (1961); St. Louis Cardinals (1961–1962); Houston Colt .45s (1962–1963); St. Louis Cardinals (1964–1965); Baltimore Orioles (1965); Chicago Cubs (1966)

Career highlights and awards
- World Series champion (1964)

Carl Wayne Warwick (February 27, 1937 – April 5, 2025) was an American professional baseball outfielder. He played six seasons in Major League Baseball (MLB) from 1961 to 1966 for the Los Angeles Dodgers, St. Louis Cardinals, Houston Colt .45s, Baltimore Orioles, and Chicago Cubs. During the 1964 World Series, he set a record by reaching base in his first four plate appearances (three singles and one base on balls) as a pinch hitter, as he helped his Cardinals defeat the New York Yankees in seven games.

== Playing career ==
Warwick batted right-handed but threw left-handed; he stood 5 feet 10 inches (1.78 m) tall and weighed 170 pounds (77 kg). Born in Dallas, Texas, he graduated from Sunset High School and then played varsity baseball for Texas Christian University, leaving after his junior season to sign a bonus contract with the Dodgers. In his second pro season, 1959 with the Victoria Rosebuds, he led the Double-A Texas League in runs scored (129) and home runs (35), hit .331 and was selected Most Valuable Player. The following year, playing with the Triple-A St. Paul Saints, he was named an American Association all-star.

Warwick made the Dodgers' 28-man early-season roster coming out of spring training in 1961, but was traded to the Cardinals May 30 with shortstop Bob Lillis for third baseman Daryl Spencer. Struggling at the plate, he spent 52 games tuning up his batting stroke with the Triple-A Charleston Marlins. He then spent the next four full seasons at the major league level.

In 1962, in another early-season trade, the Cardinals dealt him to the expansion Colt .45s on May 7. Back in his native Texas, Warwick became Houston's regular center fielder, starting in 104 games, and his 16 home runs ranked second on the club (to Román Mejías' 24). The Colt .45s moved Warwick to right field in 1963, and he got into a career-high 150 games, but his power numbers declined (hitting only seven home runs with 47 runs batted in). Just prior to spring training in 1964, the Cardinals reacquired Warwick to serve as a spare outfielder and pinch hitter. He appeared in 88 games (49 defensively), and had 11 hits in 43 at bats in a pinch hitting role, as St. Louis put on a late-season surge to win the National League pennant on the closing day of the season.

=== 1964 World Series ===
Then, in the 1964 World Series, Warwick was called on to pinch hit five times by manager Johnny Keane. He reached base four times in his first four appearances. His sixth-inning pinch single in Game 1 off Al Downing drove home the go-ahead run in the Cardinals' 9–5 triumph. He also singled and scored a run in Game 2 against Mel Stottlemyre, drew a base on balls from Jim Bouton in Game 3 and singled again off Downing in Game 4, to spark a rally capped by Ken Boyer's grand slam home run in a 4–3 Cardinal win. He fouled out off Bouton in Game 6 to complete a Series in which he batted .750 with an .800 on-base percentage, two runs scored and an RBI.

=== Final Seasons ===
The 1964 World Series was the high-water mark of Warwick's baseball career. He batted only .132 in a 1965 season split between the Cardinals and Orioles, and then .227 in 16 games for the last-place 1966 Cubs. His contract was purchased by the Orioles from the Cardinals on July 24, 1965. He appeared in nine games but was hitless in fourteen at bats. He made it on base only on three walks but scored each time. He was traded from the Orioles to the Cubs for Vic Roznovsky on March 31, 1966. He was invited to spring training by the New York Mets in 1967 but opted to retire. In the majors, Warwick collected 363 hits, including 51 doubles, 10 triples, 31 home runs and 149 RBI.

== Retirement and Honors ==
Following retirement, Warwick worked briefly as a scout for the Mets before returning to Houston and operating real estate and travel agencies. He also worked as the chairman of the MLB Alumni organization and helped start the Rotary Smith Award for the outstanding college baseball player

In 1980 Warwick was elected to the TCU Athletics Hall of Fame.

== Death ==
Warwick died in Houston on April 5, 2025, at the age of 88.
