= Román Mejías =

Cuban baseball player (1925–2023)

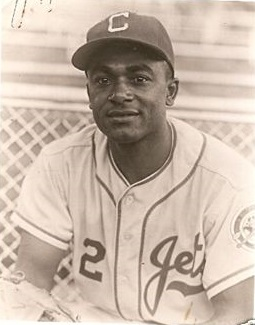
- Outfielder
- Born: August 9, 1925; Central Manuelita, Las Villas, Cuba
- Died: February 22, 2023 (aged 97); Menifee, California, U.S.
- Batted: Right Threw: Right

MLB debut
- April 13, 1955, for the Pittsburgh Pirates

Last MLB appearance
- October 4, 1964, for the Boston Red Sox

MLB statistics
- Batting average: .254
- Home runs: 54
- Runs batted in: 202
- Stats at Baseball Reference

Teams
- Pittsburgh Pirates (1955, 1957–1961); Houston Colt .45s (1962); Boston Red Sox (1963–1964); Sankei Atoms (1966)

Román Mejías Gómez (August 9, 1925 – February 22, 2023) was a Cuban professional baseball outfielder. He played in Major League Baseball (MLB) in 1955 and from 1957–1964 for the Pittsburgh Pirates, Houston Colt .45s and Boston Red Sox. He also played one season in Japan, in 1966, for the Sankei Atoms. Listed as standing 6 feet (1.8 m) tall and weighing 175 pounds (79 kg), he threw and batted right-handed.

== Biography ==
Mejías was born to Manuel Mejías and Felipa Gómez in Manuelita Sugar Mill in the Las Villas province of Cuba; the MLB widely and consistently printed his birthplace as Abreus, Cuba. He had two younger sisters, Esperosa and Santa. When he was 17, he married Nicolasa Montero and the couple had two children, Rafaela and José.

Mejías died in Menifee, California, on February 22, 2023, at the age of 97.

== Major League career ==
1962 picture pack card of Mejías for Houston Colt .45s

=== Pittsburgh Pirates ===
Mejías began his professional career in the Pirates' farm system in 1953. He spent his entire rookie campaign of 1955 on the Pittsburgh roster, appearing in 71 games, 39 as a starting outfielder. But he batted only .216 with three home runs and was sent to the top level of minor league baseball for all of 1956 and part of 1957. Recalled by the Pirates in late May 1957, Mejías backed up the regular Pittsburgh outfield (left fielder Bob Skinner, center fielder Bill Virdon and right fielder Roberto Clemente), hitting a more robust .275. In 1958 and 1959, he was the Bucs' fourth outfielder, hitting three home runs in a game against San Francisco in 1958, but then was assigned to Triple-A for most of 1960 and 1961, appearing in only seven total games and going hitless in two at bats.

=== Houston Colt .45s ===
On October 10, 1961, the Houston Colt .45s selected Mejías in the 11th round of the 1961 National League expansion draft. He was the starting right fielder in the Colt .45s' first Major League game on April 10, 1962, batting third. Mejías recorded three hits in five at bats, three runs scored and six runs batted in (RBI). He hit the first home run in franchise history, a three-run homer off Don Cardwell in the third inning, and then followed with another three-run blast in the eighth off relief pitcher Al Lary, as the Colt .45s routed the visiting Chicago Cubs, 11–2. The six RBI stood as a single-game team record until August 29, 1989, when Rafael Ramírez drove in seven in a ten-inning game, also against the Cubs. (Note: Considering nine-inning games, Mejías' 6 RBI remained as the club record until June 14, 1992, when Pete Incaviglia collected 7 RBI. Criteria: For single games, up to 1992, playing for HOU, in the regular season, requiring Runs Batted In ≥ 6, sorted by ascending date.) On April 29, he had the first walk-off home run in franchise history, hitting it in the bottom of the 9th inning against the Milwaukee Braves.

On May 10, 1962, Mejías hit the first inside-the-park home run in team history, at Colt Stadium against Don Drysdale of the Los Angeles Dodgers. Beginning May 25, he established another early club record with a 16-game hitting streak, lasting until June 10, during which he batted .368. This record maintained until 1967, when Rusty Staub hit in 20 straight. The 36-year-old Mejías held the Colts' starting right fielder job all season, appearing in a career-high 146 games. He led Houston in numerous offensive categories, including in hits (162), home runs (24), runs batted in (76), batting average (.286), stolen bases (12) and slugging percentage (.485).

=== Boston Red Sox ===
On November 26, he was traded to the Red Sox for defending American League batting champion Pete Runnels. In 1963, Mejías was Boston's opening day center fielder, but batted only .150 in 113 at bats during April and May. He did not get above .200 until June 22, and by then the often-injured Gary Geiger had taken over as the Bosox' center fielder. Mejías recovered to hit .227 with 11 home runs, but he was relegated to a reserve on the 1964 Red Sox, playing behind left fielder Tony Conigliaro (a 19-year-old rookie), center fielder Carl Yastrzemski and right fielder Lee Thomas. He then was assigned to the Red Sox' Triple-A Toronto Maple Leafs affiliate, where he was a playing coach in 1965 before decamping for Japan, where he batted .288 with no home runs in 30 games in 1966, his last professional season. In 627 big-league games, Mejías collected 449 hits, with 57 doubles, 12 triples and 54 home runs. He batted .254. As a minor leaguer, he hit .299 in 806 games played.
