= Ed Olivares =

Puerto Rican baseball player (1938–2022)

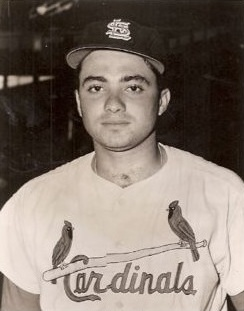
- Outfielder / Third baseman
- Born: November 5, 1938; Brooklyn, New York, U.S.
- Died: October 14, 2022 (aged 83)
- Batted: Right Threw: Right

MLB debut
- September 16, 1960, for the St. Louis Cardinals

Last MLB appearance
- September 26, 1961, for the St. Louis Cardinals

MLB statistics
- Batting average: .143
- Hits: 5
- Runs batted in: 1
- Stats at Baseball Reference

Teams
- St. Louis Cardinals (1960–1961)

Edward Olivares Balzac (November 5, 1938 – October 14, 2022) was an American Major League Baseball outfielder and third baseman who spent parts of two seasons playing for the St. Louis Cardinals. Olivares' full professional baseball career extended for nine years (1957–1961; 1963–1966). He batted and threw right-handed, stood 5 feet 11 inches (1.80 m) tall and weighed 180 pounds (82 kg).

== Career ==
Olivares was originally signed by the Philadelphia Phillies before the 1957 season. He was acquired by the Cardinals prior to 1958 and made his major-league debut during the 1960 season, after he was the Most Valuable Player, home run champion (35) and runs batted in leader (125) of the Class B Carolina League playing for Winston-Salem. In his two trials for the MLB Redbirds, he got into 24 games with 11 starts. But he managed only five hits, all singles, in 35 at bats (with no bases on balls), for a batting average of .143.

Following the 1961 season, Olivares was drafted by the Houston Colt .45s with the 33rd overall selection in the 1961 expansion draft, but never appeared in another major league game.

His son, Omar, was an MLB pitcher for 12 seasons. Ed Olivares died on October 14, 2022, at the age of 83.

== See also ==
- List of Major League Baseball players from Puerto Rico
