= Turk Farrell =

American baseball player (1934–1977)

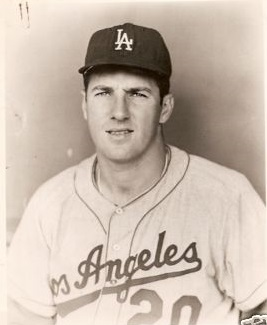
- Farrell with the Dodgers
- Pitcher
- Born: April 8, 1934; Boston, Massachusetts, U.S.
- Died: June 10, 1977 (aged 43); Great Yarmouth, England
- Batted: Right Threw: Right

MLB debut
- September 21, 1956, for the Philadelphia Phillies

Last MLB appearance
- September 17, 1969, for the Philadelphia Phillies

MLB statistics
- Win–loss record: 106–111
- Earned run average: 3.45
- Strikeouts: 1,177
- Stats at Baseball Reference

Teams
- Philadelphia Phillies (1956–1961); Los Angeles Dodgers (1961); Houston Colt .45s / Astros (1962–1967); Philadelphia Phillies (1967–1969)

Career highlights and awards
- 5× All-Star (1958, 1962, 1962², 1964, 1965)

Richard Joseph "Turk" Farrell (April 8, 1934 – June 10, 1977) was an American professional baseball pitcher who played in Major League Baseball (MLB) from 1956 to 1969, spending his entire 14-year MLB career in the National League (NL). He threw and batted right-handed. Farrell's son is former MLB pitcher Richard Dotson.

== Career ==
1962 picture pack card of Farrell for Houston Colt .45s

Born in Boston, Massachusetts, he played for the NL Philadelphia Phillies, Los Angeles Dodgers, and Houston Colt .45s / Astros.

Before the 1953 season, Farrell was signed by the Philadelphia Phillies as an amateur free agent. The 19-year-old began his Minor League Baseball (MiLB) career with the class A Schenectady Blue Jays. There, over a two-year span (1953–54), he would build a Win–loss record of 18–18, with a 3.30 ERA. He spent 1955 in the IL, with the Syracuse Chiefs, going 12–12 with a 3.94 ERA; in 1956, he played for the Miami Marlins, going 12–6 with a 2.50 ERA.

In September, 1956, Farrell would get a late-season look by the Phillies and would lose his only decision; but he set the groundwork for a 14-year run in the major leagues. Farrell was one of the young Phillies pitchers of the late 1950s, along with Jack Meyer and Jim Owens, dubbed the "Dalton Gang" for their fun-loving late-hour escapades. "When he loses, he loses his temper," a teammate once said of Farrell, "but when he wins he's the life of the party." Bearing the brunt on one occasion was the mirror in a Milwaukee bar, broken by Farrell's fist with the explanation, "I looked in the mirror and didn't like what I saw, so I threw a punch."

Phillies fans liked what they saw of the 6 ft 4 in (1.93 m) hard-throwing rookie right-hander in 1957 when he was 10–2 plus 10 saves and a 2.38 ERA in 52 appearances out of the bullpen. On September 3, 1957, Farrell was the winning pitcher for the Phillies in the last of fifteen home games the Dodgers played at the Jersey City Roosevelt Stadium, 3–2 in twelve innings. After four more seasons of relief work with the Phillies, Farrell was traded along with Joe Koppe to the Dodgers for Don Demeter and Charley Smith on 4 May 1961.

Farrell was selected in the 1961 MLB expansion draft by the Houston Colt .45s. In 1962, Farrell finished with the seventh best ERA at 3.02, but with a poor 10–20 record due to low run support.

A starter in Houston, Farrell was used almost exclusively in relief with Philadelphia and Los Angeles. His career totals include 590 games pitched (134 starts), a won-loss record of 106–111, 83 saves, and an ERA of 3.45.

He was selected to the National League All-Star team five times (1958, 1962, 1962, 1964 and 1965) in his career.

Farrell last pitched in the major leagues on September 19, 1969, for the Phillies against the Expos in a game the Phillies lost 10–6. Farrell went 1 2/3 innings in the first game of a doubleheader at Parc Jarry, allowing one hit and striking out one.

== Later life ==
Farrell moved to England, where he lived and worked on an offshore oil rig just off Great Britain in the North Sea.

He was killed on June 10, 1977, in an auto accident in Great Yarmouth, England, at age 43. He was buried in Houston, Texas.
