= Ed Bressoud =

American baseball player (1932–2023)

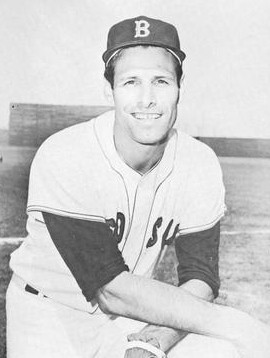
- Bressoud with the Boston Red Sox in 1965
- Shortstop
- Born: May 2, 1932; Los Angeles, California, U.S.
- Died: July 13, 2023 (aged 91); Walnut Creek, California, U.S.
- Batted: Right Threw: Right

MLB debut
- June 14, 1956, for the New York Giants

Last MLB appearance
- September 26, 1967, for the St. Louis Cardinals

MLB statistics
- Batting average: .252
- Home runs: 94
- Runs batted in: 365
- Stats at Baseball Reference

Teams
- New York / San Francisco Giants (1956–1961); Boston Red Sox (1962–1965); New York Mets (1966); St. Louis Cardinals (1967)

Career highlights and awards
- All-Star (1964); World Series champion (1967)

Edward Francis Bressoud (May 2, 1932 – July 13, 2023) was an American professional baseball shortstop. Bressoud played in Major League Baseball (MLB) from 1956 through 1967 for the New York / San Francisco Giants (1956–1961), Boston Red Sox (1962–1965), New York Mets (1966) and St. Louis Cardinals (1967). He was an MLB All-Star in 1964 and won the 1967 World Series.

== Early life and education ==
Bressoud was born in Los Angeles, the fourth of seven children of Charles Bressoud (1900-1969), who immigrated from Lima, Peru and was of French descent and Josephine Felice Mibielle (1902-1978). He attended Mount Carmel High School and transferred to George Washington High School, which he graduated from in 1950.

During his playing career, Bressoud attended El Camino Junior College and Los Angeles City College. He earned a Bachelor of Science in physical education from the University of California, Los Angeles. He also earned a master's degree from San Jose State University.

== Playing career ==
Bressoud signed with the New York Giants in 1950. He played in Minor League Baseball through the 1955 season, with the exception of his service in the United States Marine Corps during the Korean War from January 1953 to January 1955.

In 1956, Bill Rigney became the manager of the Giants. Bressoud had played shortstop for Rigney in the minor leagues, and Alvin Dark, the regular Giants' shortstop, had been injured in August 1955. During spring training, Rigney made plans to move Dark to third base and make Bressoud the starting shortstop. However, Bressoud started slowly and was sent back to Minneapolis at the beginning of the year. Dark was traded to the St. Louis Cardinals on June 14, and Bressoud was immediately recalled to take his place.

Bressoud spent two years with the MLB club in New York City, then four years after its 1958 transfer to San Francisco. He was the Giants' regular shortstop in both 1959 and 1960, hitting .251 and .225. Bressoud was the first selection of the Houston Colt .45s in the 1961 expansion draft in October, then was traded to the Red Sox in exchange for their regular shortstop, Don Buddin, in November 1961.

Bressoud played four seasons for Boston, hitting 40 doubles, nine triples, 14 home runs, 79 runs and a career-high 68 runs batted in (RBIs) in 1962, and 59 extra-bases in 1963, including a career-high 20 home runs and four two-HR games. In 1964, Bressoud was named to the American League roster for the 1964 MLB All-Star Game as an injury replacement for Luis Aparicio. Bressoud posted career-high numbers in batting average (.293), hits (166), runs (86) and doubles (41).

After the 1965 season, the Red Sox traded Bressoud to the New York Mets for Joe Christopher. The Mets traded Bressoud, Danny Napoleon, and cash to the St. Louis Cardinals for Jerry Buchek, Art Mahaffey and Tony Martínez on April 1, 1967. In the 1967 World Series, Bressoud appeared in Games 2 and 5 as a late-inning replacement for light-hitting Cardinal shortstop Dal Maxvill, but did not record a plate appearance.

== Later life and death ==
Following his playing retirement he managed in the minor leagues and scouted for the California Angels. He was a faculty member, coach, and dean of athletics at De Anza College.

Bressoud married his high school sweetheart, Eleanor Griesser, on June 6, 1953. Eleanor died from a brain tumor on April 29, 1958. Bressoud met Carol Mathews, a flight attendant, on a flight to San Francisco. They married on February 7, 1959. He had two sons with his first wife and two daughters with his second wife.

Bressoud died from cerebellar ataxia in Walnut Creek, California, on July 13, 2023, at age 91.
