= Ken Johnson (right-handed pitcher) =

American baseball player (1933–2015)

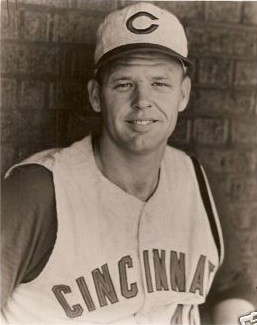
- Pitcher
- Born: June 16, 1933; West Palm Beach, Florida, U.S.
- Died: November 21, 2015 (aged 82); Pineville, Louisiana, U.S.
- Batted: Right Threw: Right

MLB debut
- September 13, 1958, for the Kansas City Athletics

Last MLB appearance
- April 18, 1970, for the Montreal Expos

MLB statistics
- Win–loss record: 91–106
- Earned run average: 3.46
- Strikeouts: 1,042
- Stats at Baseball Reference

Teams
- Kansas City Athletics (1958–1961); Cincinnati Reds (1961); Houston Colt .45s / Astros (1962–1965); Milwaukee / Atlanta Braves (1965–1969); New York Yankees (1969); Chicago Cubs (1969); Montreal Expos (1970)

Career highlights and awards
- Pitched a no-hitter on April 23, 1964

Kenneth Travis Johnson (June 16, 1933 – November 21, 2015) was an American right-handed pitcher in Major League Baseball who is the only pitcher to lose a complete game nine-inning no-hitter. In all or parts of 13 seasons, he pitched for the Kansas City Athletics (1958–61), Cincinnati Reds (1961), Houston Colt .45/Astros (1962–65), Milwaukee/Atlanta Braves (1965–69), New York Yankees (1969), Chicago Cubs (1969), and Montreal Expos (1970). Including minor league service, his professional baseball career lasted for 18 seasons. Johnson stood 6 feet 4 inches (1.93 m) tall and weighed 210 pounds (95 kg).

== Early life ==
Ken Johnson was born in West Palm Beach, Florida, on June 16, 1933.

Although a natural left-hander, Johnson became a right-handed pitcher because a right-handed glove was the only one his father could find for his son.

Johnson played baseball throughout each of his high school years at Palm Beach High School then was drafted and served a two year enlistment in the United States Army at Fort Jackson, in Columbia, South Carolina, which is where he later met his wife of 60 years who, at that time, was attending the University of South Carolina. Joanna Lynn Ergle was studying education when they married on March 11, 1955. Johnson also attended the University of South Carolina for a year and then joined a minor league baseball affiliate of the Philadelphia Athletics.

== Baseball career ==
Johnson spent almost a decade in the organization of the Philadelphia / Kansas City Athletics before establishing himself as a starting pitcher in the major leagues. He made his debut with Kansas City in a two-game trial during September 1958, and was hit hard (posting a 18.90 earned run average). Another two-game, late-season audition happened a year later; this time, he was given two starting assignments, split two decisions, and lowered his ERA to 4.09. Johnson then spent all of 1960 with the Athletics, getting into 42 games (all but six as a relief pitcher). Pitching for a last-place team, he was 5–10, with two complete games, three saves and a 4.26 ERA. But when the 1961 season started, Johnson struggled: in six games (and only one start), he lost all four decisions and his earned run average ballooned to 10.61. He was traded to the independently operated Toronto Maple Leafs of the Triple-A International League on May 8. He worked in 19 games for the Maple Leafs and pitched reasonably well. Ten weeks later, on July 21, Toronto traded Johnson to the Cincinnati Reds, a surprise pennant contender in the National League. The trade, and Johnson's addition of the knuckleball to his repertoire, enabled him to solidify his status as a major league pitcher.

The Reds were in first place by 11/2 games over the Los Angeles Dodgers, but had lost five games in a row when Johnson was acquired. Between July 26 and September 16, Johnson made 11 starts, winning six games, losing two, and posting three complete games and his first MLB shutout. He helped the Reds widen their lead to 41/2 games, which was essentially their winning margin as they captured the fourth National League championship in their long history. But Johnson played in only one game of the 1961 World Series against the New York Yankees. In Game 5, the Series' final contest, working in relief with Cincinnati trailing 6–0 in the second inning, he retired the only two Yankees to face him (Elston Howard and Bill Skowron), then was removed for a pinch hitter. The Yankees went on to win the game, 13–5, and the 1961 world championship.

The following day, on October 10, 1961, Johnson was selected with the 29th pick in the 1961 Major League Baseball expansion draft by the fledgling Houston Colt .45s. He pitched three full seasons (1962–64) and part of a fourth (in 1965) for the Houston franchise (renamed the Astros in Johnson's final year), making 106 starts and compiling a solid 3.41 earned run average in 6902/3 innings pitched, but his win–loss record was only 32–51.

Johnson began 1965 by winning three of five decisions for the Astros. Then, on May 23, he was traded to the Braves, who were in their final year in Milwaukee. As a Brave, Johnson had three successive winning years, capturing 13, 14 and 13 games from 1965–67, with earned run averages of 3.21, 3.30 and 2.74. He started the second game in Atlanta Braves' history on April 13, 1966, but absorbed a 6–0 loss at the hands of the Pittsburgh Pirates. Altogether, however, Johnson's years with the Braves were his most successful in the majors: he won 45 games, lost 34, and put up a strong 3.22 earned run average in three full campaigns and parts of two others.

Johnson pitched for four teams in his last two years in the big leagues, 1969 and 1970, bouncing from the Braves to the Yankees, Chicago Cubs and Montreal Expos. He retired after the 1970 season with a career record of 91–106 and a 3.46 earned run average. In 334 games pitched, with 213 starts, he allowed 1,670 hits and 413 bases on balls in 1,7371/3 innings pitched, with 1,042 strikeouts, 50 complete games, seven shutouts and eight saves. The 1961 World Series was his only postseason appearance.

== No-hit game ==
Pitching for the Colt .45s on April 23, 1964 at Colt Stadium, Johnson gave up no hits in a 1–0 loss to his former team, the Cincinnati Reds. The game's only run was scored in the top of the ninth after Pete Rose reached second base on an error (by Johnson himself), went to third on a ground-out, and scored on a second error, this one by second baseman Nellie Fox on Vada Pinson's ground ball. Opposing pitcher Joe Nuxhall retired the side in the bottom half to make Johnson a no-hit loser. Johnson still is the only player to ever lose an official no-hitter by himself. Johnson later appeared as a guest on I've Got a Secret telling this story to the panelists.

== Post-retirement ==
After his retirement in 1970, Johnson returned to West Palm Beach where he worked as a baseball coach at what is now Palm Beach Atlantic University. Subsequently, Johnson moved to Pineville, Louisiana where he worked as an assistant baseball coach at Louisiana College until his retirement in 2000.

Johnson also served as a deacon at the First Baptists Church and Pineville and at New Life Community Church in Alexandria, Louisiana, and had a very active nursing home visitation for many years.

== Death and legacy ==
Johnson died at the age of 82 at his home in Pineville. He had Parkinson's and Alzheimer's diseases for two years prior to contracting a kidney infection, which led to his death.

His survivors include his wife Joanna, sons Ken Johnson Jr., and Russell Johnson, and daughter Janet Lynne Johnson, all of whom reside in the Pineville area, along with grandchildren, Dr. Jason Johnson from Memphis, Tennessee, Kelly Bentley from Pineville, Beth Maurey from Pineville, Jennifer Phillips from Lake Charles, Jillian and Jalayne Johnson from Lake Charles; great grandchildren, Kassidy Bentley from Pineville, Collin Maurey from Pineville, Carter Sullivan and Evan Phillips from Lake Charles and Eden Johnson of Memphis; brother, Ernest Henry Johnson, Jr.

Because of the way baseball defines a "no-hitter", at the time of his death Johnson remained the only pitcher officially credited with a no-hitter that he lost. In a 2004 interview Johnson said he regretted being the answer to a piece of baseball trivia, saying "Instead of the notoriety, I'd rather have won the game."

== See also ==
- Houston Astros award winners and league leaders
- List of Houston Astros no-hitters
- List of Major League Baseball no-hitters

Awards and achievements
Preceded by Juan Marichal	No-hitter pitcher April 23, 1964	Succeeded by Sandy Koufax
