= Don Taussig =

American baseball player (born 1932)

- Outfielder
- Born: February 19, 1932 (age 93); New York City, U.S.
- Batted: Right Threw: Right

MLB debut
- April 23, 1958, for the San Francisco Giants

Last MLB appearance
- August 11, 1962, for the Houston Colt .45s

MLB statistics
- Batting average: .262
- Home runs: 4
- Runs batted in: 30
- Stats at Baseball Reference

Teams
- San Francisco Giants (1958); St. Louis Cardinals (1961); Houston Colt .45s (1962)

Donald Franklin Taussig (born February 19, 1932) is an American former professional baseball player. He was an outfielder who played all or part of three seasons in Major League Baseball for the 1958 San Francisco Giants, 1961 St. Louis Cardinals, and 1962 Houston Colt .45s. He threw and batted right-handed, stood 6 feet (1.8 m) tall and weighed 180 pounds (82 kg).

== Biography ==
Taussig was born in New York City, and is Jewish. He attended Long Beach High School in Long Beach, New York, Rutgers University in New Brunswick, New Jersey, and Hofstra University in Hempstead, New York.

He signed with one of his hometown teams, the New York Yankees, in 1950. After only one year in the low minors, he was acquired by another New York-based team, the Giants. In 1957 he batted .286/.348/.493 with 95 runs (2nd in the Texas League), 22 home runs (3rd), and 91 RBIs (2nd). He played in the Giant farm system until 1958, the club's first season in San Francisco. He got into 39 games during the season's first three months, although he started only eight in the outfield, and collected ten hits before being sent down to the Triple-A Phoenix Giants. He then spent all of 1959 and 1960 at the Triple-A level. In 1960, as a member of the Portland Beavers, he batted .286/.352/.500 and hit 23 home runs (6th in the Pacific Coast League) with 101 runs batted in (4th), and when the Beavers signed a working agreement with the Cardinals, Taussig's MLB rights were included. He then spent all of 1961 on the St. Louis roster, appearing in 98 games, including 47 starts in the outfield. He batted .287 with 14 doubles, five triples and two home runs.

He then was the expansion Houston Colt .45s' tenth selection, 19th overall, in the 1961 Major League Baseball expansion draft. He split the 1962 season between Houston and its Triple-A farm club, the Oklahoma City 89ers, playing in his final 16 Major League games. Taussig's minor league career continued through 1964.

In a total of 153 MLB games played, Taussig had 69 hits and batted .262. Defensively, he committed only one error in 168 total chances for a .994 fielding percentage playing at all three outfield positions.
