= Jim Pendleton =

American baseball player (1924–1996)

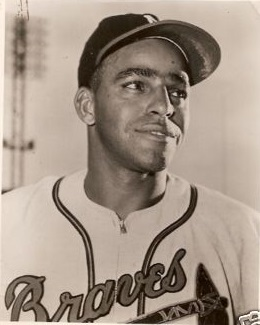
- Outfielder
- Born: January 7, 1924; St. Charles, Missouri, U.S.
- Died: March 20, 1996 (aged 72); Houston, Texas, U.S.
- Batted: Right Threw: Right

Professional debut
- NgL: 1948, for the Chicago American Giants
- MLB: April 17, 1953, for the Milwaukee Braves

Last MLB appearance
- September 30, 1962, for the Houston Colt .45s

MLB (Note: On December 16, 2020, Major League Baseball declared the Negro leagues, from the span of 1920–1948, to be a "Major League". Pendleton's statistics reflect his time in the Negro leagues during the 1948 season.) statistics
- Batting average: .259
- Home runs: 20
- Runs batted in: 105
- Stats at Baseball Reference

Teams
- Chicago American Giants (1948); Milwaukee Braves (1953–1956); Pittsburgh Pirates (1957–1958); Cincinnati Reds (1959); Houston Colt .45s (1962)

James Edward “Jim” Pendleton (January 7, 1924 — March 20, 1996) was an African American professional baseball player, an outfielder in Major League Baseball (MLB) between 1953 and 1962. He played for the Milwaukee Braves, Pittsburgh Pirates, Cincinnati Reds and Houston Colt .45s. Before appearing in MLB, he was a Negro league player. He was a right-handed batter and thrower, measured 6 feet (1.8 m) tall and weighed 185 pounds (84 kg).

== Early life ==
Jim Pendleton was born in 1924 in St. Charles, Missouri. Pendleton joined a Negro minor league team in Asheville before he was promoted to the Negro American League in 1948. Playing shortstop for the Chicago American Giants, he hit .301. The following year, he was in the American Association as an outfielder with the St. Paul Saints, an affiliate of the Brooklyn Dodgers. Upon signing with the Dodgers organization, he took two years off his age. He was the only black player in the American Association at the time of his signing. In 1951, St. Paul moved him back to shortstop. The next year, he played for the Dodgers' minor league team in Montreal.

Between 1950 and 1952, Pendleton hit between .291 and .301 each season, averaging 14 home runs and more than 15 triples per year during that period. Despite his minor league success, two factors worked against the possibility of a promotion to the Dodgers. Brooklyn already had a star major league shortstop, Pee Wee Reese, and the franchise was worried about backlash from the rest of baseball if it promoted more than one black player to the major leagues each year. The Dodgers also rejected trade offers from other teams during that time.

== MLB career ==
With Reese holding strong as the Dodgers shortstop, Brooklyn agreed to a trade that sent Pendleton to the Milwaukee Braves as part of a four-team February 1953 transaction that involved Cincinnati and the Philadelphia Phillies, as well as the Dodgers. He made his MLB debut at 29 on April 17, 1953. On August 30 of that season, Pendleton hit three home runs in a game against the Pittsburgh Pirates, to become just the second rookie in Major League history to hit three homers in a single game, joining his teammate Eddie Mathews, who did it a year earlier.

Overall, Pendleton played more than 100 games in the outfield for Milwaukee and batted .299 in a part-time role, which increased his popularity. In 1957, he hit .305 in 46 games for the Pirates, but after three at bats in 1958, he was sent back to the minors for the rest of 1958 campaign. He was a member of the first Houston Colt .45s team in 1962 and played in 117 games at the age of 38.

In his MLB career, Pendleton appeared in 444 games over eight seasons, hitting 19 home runs. He died in Houston, Texas, at the age of 72.

== See also ==
- List of Negro league baseball players who played in Major League Baseball
