= Ernie Fazio =

American baseball player (1942-2017)

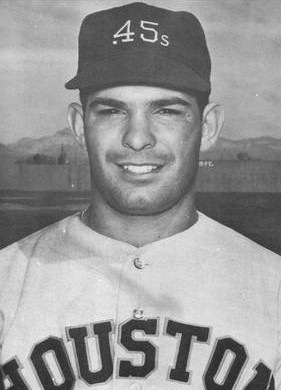
- Second baseman
- Born: January 25, 1942; Oakland, California, U.S.
- Died: December 1, 2017 (aged 75); Danville, California, U.S.
- Batted: Right Threw: Right

MLB debut
- July 3, 1962, for the Houston Colt .45s

Last MLB appearance
- October 2, 1966, for the Kansas City Athletics

MLB statistics
- Batting average: .182
- Home runs: 2
- Runs batted in: 8
- Stats at Baseball Reference

Teams
- Houston Colt .45s (1962–1963); Kansas City Athletics (1966)

Ernest Joseph Fazio (January 25, 1942 – December 1, 2017) was an American professional baseball second baseman. He played in Major League Baseball (MLB) for the Houston Colt .45s (1962–63) and Kansas City Athletics (1966). Fazio attended Santa Clara University, threw and batted right-handed, stood 5 feet 7 inches (1.70 m) tall and weighed 165 pounds (75 kg).

Fazio signed with the Colt .45s and split his first professional season, 1962, between Houston's first-ever National League team and its Triple-A affiliate, the Oklahoma City 89ers. In 1963, he was able to play in 102 games for Houston by filling in at second base, third base and shortstop. He hit both of his major league home runs in that year, off lefthanders Denny Lemaster and Hall of Famer Warren Spahn of the Milwaukee Braves.

After the 1965 season, he was the "player to be named later" in an earlier trade that sent Houston pitcher Jesse Hickman to the Athletics for slugger Jim Gentile. Despite his small stature, Fazio had shown power that year by hitting 23 home runs for Oklahoma City. He played in 27 games for the Athletics as a backup infielder during the 1966 season. Fazio's brother – John Richina started and coached Oakland Dynamites Pop Warner, Oakland, CA & managed Babe Ruth Baseball

All told, Fazio appeared in 141 MLB games, and garnered 50 hits in 274 at bats.
