= Norm Larker =

American baseball player (1930–2007)

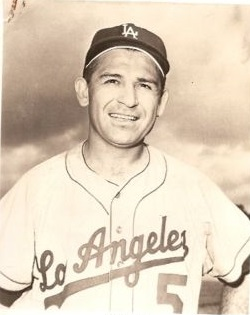
- First baseman/Outfielder
- Born: December 27, 1930; Beaver Meadows, Pennsylvania, U.S.
- Died: March 12, 2007 (aged 76); Long Beach, California, U.S.
- Batted: Left Threw: Left

MLB debut
- April 15, 1958, for the Los Angeles Dodgers

Last MLB appearance
- September 28, 1963, for the San Francisco Giants

MLB statistics
- Batting average: .275
- Home runs: 32
- Runs batted in: 271
- Stats at Baseball Reference

Teams
- Los Angeles Dodgers (1958–1961); Houston Colt .45s (1962); Milwaukee Braves (1963); San Francisco Giants (1963); Toei Flyers (1965–1966)

Career highlights and awards
- 2× All-Star (1960, 1960²); World Series champion (1959)

Norman Howard John Larker (December 27, 1930 – March 12, 2007) was an American professional baseball player. A first baseman who, early in his career, also frequently played corner outfielder, he appeared in 667 games in Major League Baseball (MLB) (1958–1963) for four National League clubs, most notably the Los Angeles Dodgers. Larker also spent two years (1965 and 1966) in Nippon Professional Baseball (NPB). He was listed as 6 feet (1.8 m) tall and 185 pounds (84 kg), and batted and threw left-handed.

== Early baseball career ==
Larker was born in Beaver Meadows, Pennsylvania, and graduated from Hazleton High School. He began his pro career with the local Hazleton Mountaineers of the Class D North Atlantic League in 1949, and batted .299. When the Brooklyn Dodgers signed a working agreement with the Mountaineers for 1950, Larker joined the Dodger organization and promptly rose through their farm system, reaching the Triple-A level in 1954. He batted over .300 for three consecutive years (1955–1957) in the American Association but was unable to crack the Brooklyn lineup, which featured eight-time All-Star first baseman Gil Hodges. Larker was selected by the Chicago White Sox in the 1957 Rule 5 Draft, but failed to make the 1957 ChiSox roster and was offered back to the Dodger organization.

== Six years in major leagues ==
Placed on the 28-man, early-season squad of the first-ever edition of the Los Angeles Dodgers as a 27-year-old rookie in 1958, Larker proceeded to win a permanent roster spot. He started five games in left field during April, but struggled offensively and was relegated to pinch hitting duty. He was still hitting only .214 on June 30 when his slumbering bat awakened. Starting 23 games at first base and left field in July 1958, Larker raised his batting average to .338 by August 1 on the strength of nine multi-hit games. He finished 1958 with 70 hits and a .779 OPS.

Then, in his sophomore season, he was a key contributor to the Dodgers' 1959 National League and World Series championship team. Larker started 85 of Los Angeles' 156 regular season games (55 at first base and 30 in the outfield), raised his batting average to .289, and hit eight home runs. The Dodgers rose from seventh place in 1958 to a flat-footed tie with the defending NL champion Milwaukee Braves, forcing a best-of-three playoff. In the 1959 National League tie-breaker series, Larker was the Dodgers' starting right fielder in Game 1 and starting left fielder in Game 2. He collected five hits in eight at bats, with three runs batted in, as the Dodgers swept the Braves to win the pennant. He then started all six games of the 1959 World Series in the outfield against the White Sox and notched three hits and two bases on balls. He batted only .188, but the Dodgers took the series to win the second world championship in their history, and their first in Los Angeles.

Larker's most productive MLB season came in 1960. With the 36-year-old Hodges hobbled by injury and limited to only 41 games started in the field, Larker took over as Los Angeles' regular first baseman. Starting 112 games and appearing in 133 contests overall, Larker reached career bests in hits (142), doubles (26), runs batted in (78), batting average (.323) and OPS (.798). He battled for the National League batting title into the season's final days with NL Most Valuable Player Dick Groat of the Pittsburgh Pirates before finishing second by two one-thousandths of a point. Still, his .323 mark allowed him to finish ahead of Willie Mays (.319), Roberto Clemente (.314) and Ken Boyer (.304). He finished 15th in NL MVP voting for 1960, but was selected to the Senior Circuit's All-Star team. In the two All-Star games played that season, Larker appeared in each game as a pinch hitter, hitting into a force play in the first contest, and drawing a base on balls in the latter.

The 1961 season was Larker's fourth and last in a Dodger uniform. He started 79 games at first base, but his production declined: his average fell to .270 and his OPS to .712. With Larker approaching his 31st birthday and the Dodgers anxious to integrate rising young stars Frank Howard and Ron Fairly into their lineup, Larker was left unprotected in the NL expansion draft. Selected by the brand-new Houston Colt .45s with the 23rd overall pick, Larker became the expansion team's starting first baseman in 1962. He batted cleanup in Houston's first-ever major league game on April 10, 1962, going one-for-four with an RBI in an 11–2 Colt .45 win. In 1962, Larker got into 147 games played and hit nine home runs, with 58 runs scored, all career bests. He led the Colt .45s in doubles (19) and on-base percentage (.358) and tied for the team lead in bases on balls (70).

But at season's end, he was traded to the Milwaukee Braves in a four-player deal that sent starting pitcher Don Nottebart to Houston. The Braves' 1963 regular first-base job was wide open with the trading away of veteran Joe Adcock, but Larker could not claim it. After two months of action and 25 games started, he was hitting only .220, and his production worsened as his playing time became even more limited. He was hitting an anaemic .177 with one home run when the Braves sold his contract to the San Francisco Giants on August 8, 1963. His slump continuing, Larker collected only one hit with the Giants in very limited service over the last two months of the season, his last in the majors.

In his six-season career, Larker was a .275 hitter (538-for-1,953) with 32 home runs and 271 RBI in 667 games, including 227 runs, 97 doubles, 15 triples, and three stolen bases. He also collected a .347 OBP and a solid 1.28 walk-to-strikeout ratio (211-to-165). Defensively, Larker compiled a career .991 fielding percentage at first base (in 483 games) and in the outfield (82 games).

== Career in Japan and winter leagues ==
After spending 1964 with the Giants' Triple-A Tacoma farm club, Larker signed with the Toei Flyers in Japan's Pacific League, where he played in 1965–1966. In 224 NPB games, he batted .267 with 194 hits, 28 doubles, 14 homers and 85 runs batted in. During his career, Larker also played winter ball with the Navegantes del Magallanes club of the Venezuelan Professional Baseball League, where he captured the batting crown with a .340 average in the 1955–1956 season.

After leaving baseball, Larker entered private business in Long Beach, California, where he'd moved in the late 1950s during his tenure with the Dodgers. He died from cancer in Long Beach at the age of 76, survived by his wife, four sons and eight grandchildren.
