= George Williams (infielder) =

American baseball player (1939-2009)

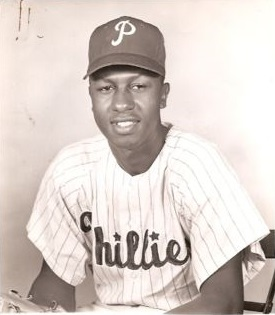
- Second baseman
- Born: October 23, 1939; Detroit, Michigan
- Died: May 14, 2009 (aged 69); Detroit, Michigan
- Batted: Right Threw: Right

MLB debut
- July 16, 1961, for the Philadelphia Phillies

Last MLB appearance
- July 5, 1964, for the Kansas City Athletics

MLB statistics
- Batting average: .230
- Home runs: 0
- Runs batted in: 5
- Stats at Baseball Reference

Teams
- Philadelphia Phillies (1961); Houston Colt .45s (1962); Kansas City Athletics (1964)

George Williams (October 23, 1939 – May 14, 2009) was an American professional baseball second baseman. He played in Major League Baseball (MLB) for three different teams between the 1961 and 1964 seasons. Listed at 5 feet 11 inches (1.80 m), 165 pounds (75 kg), Williams batted and threw right-handed. He was born in Detroit, Michigan.

Williams entered the majors in 1961 with the Philadelphia Phillies, playing for them for one year before joining the Houston Colt .45's in 1962 and the Kansas City Athletics in 1964.

In a three season career, Williams was a .230 hitter (31-for-135) with 15 runs and five runs batted in in 59 games including seven doubles without any home runs.

An 11-season minor league veteran, Williams hit .277 with 71 homers and 430 RBI in 1,143 games for 10 teams from 1958 through 1968.

In between, he played for the Leones del Caracas club of the Venezuelan Winter League during the 1966–1967 season.

Williams died from lung cancer in his home city of Detroit at the age of 69.
