= Jesse Hickman =

American baseball player (1939-2022)

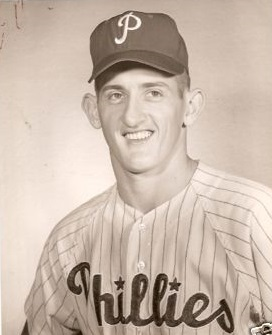
- Pitcher
- Born: February 18, 1939; Lecompte, Louisiana, U.S.
- Died: March 26, 2022 (aged 83); Alexandria, Louisiana, U.S.
- Batted: Right Threw: Right

MLB debut
- June 5, 1965, for the Kansas City Athletics

Last MLB appearance
- April 30, 1966, for the Kansas City Athletics

MLB statistics
- Win–loss record: 0–1
- Earned run average: 5.51
- Innings: 16 1/3
- Stats at Baseball Reference

Teams
- Kansas City Athletics (1965–1966)

Jesse Owens Hickman (February 18, 1939 – March 26, 2022) was an American professional baseball pitcher, who played in Major League Baseball (MLB) for the Kansas City Athletics (1965–1966). The 6 feet 2 inches (1.88 m), 186 pounds (84 kg) right-hander attended Louisiana Christian University.

Hickman originally signed with the Philadelphia Phillies, pitching the 1960 and 1961 seasons in their farm system. After being selected by the Houston Colt .45s in the 1962 Expansion Draft, he played in the Houston (1962–1964 Colts and 1965 Astros) minor league system.

Hickman was traded to the Athletics with a player to be named later (infielder Ernie Fazio) for slugging first baseman Jim Gentile, on June 4, 1965. The following night, Hickman made his Major League debut at home in relief against the Boston Red Sox. Although he pitched a scoreless tenth inning, Hickman surrendered a home run to Red Sox closer Dick Radatz in the eleventh frame and took the 5–3 loss, Hickman‘s only big league decision. The homer, Radatz' only MLB long ball, cleared the deep left-field fence at Municipal Stadium.

Hickman appeared in 12 more MLB games during 1965 and 1966, striking out 16 men in 16 1/3 innings pitched, but yielding ten earned runs, nine hits, and nine bases on balls. He retired from baseball after spending the 1967 season in the California Angels’ minor league system.
