= Bob Lillis =

American baseball player and manager (born 1930)

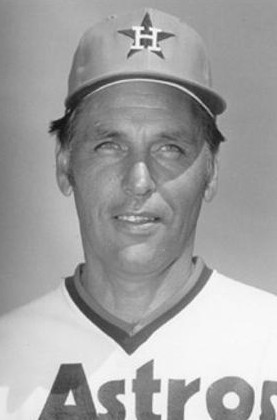
- Lillis in 1976
- Infielder / Manager / Coach
- Born: June 2, 1930 (age 96); Altadena, California, U.S.
- Batted: Right Threw: Right

MLB debut
- August 17, 1958, for the Los Angeles Dodgers

Last MLB appearance
- September 17, 1967, for the Houston Astros

MLB statistics
- Batting average: .236
- Home runs: 3
- Runs batted in: 137
- Games managed: 537
- Win–loss record: 276–261
- Winning %: .514
- Stats at Baseball Reference
- Managerial record at Baseball Reference

Teams
- As player: Los Angeles Dodgers (1958–1961); St. Louis Cardinals (1961); Houston Colt .45s/Astros (1962–1967); As manager: Houston Astros (1982–1985); As coach: Houston Astros (1967, 1973–1982); San Francisco Giants (1986–1996)

Robert Perry Lillis (born June 2, 1930) is an American former infielder, manager, coach and scout in Major League Baseball (MLB). Lillis was an original member of the 1962 expansion Houston Colt .45s who remained with the club (renamed the Astros in 1965) for more than two decades and later became its manager. He threw and batted right-handed and was listed as 5 feet 11 inches (1.80 m) tall and 160 pounds (73 kg).

== Early life ==
Lillis was born in Altadena, California, and he attended Pasadena High School, where he was an All-Southern California shortstop for the baseball team. Lillis played baseball at Pasadena City College and then transferred to the University of Southern California (USC).

== Playing career ==
Lillis signed his first contract with the Brooklyn Dodgers in 1951. A shortstop by trade, he spent eight years in the Dodger farm system, buried (along with many others) behind Hall of Famer Pee Wee Reese. In 1958, the Dodgers' first season in Lillis's home city of Los Angeles, he made the Major League team. Lillis never claimed the regular shortstop job—that would go to Maury Wills—and in the middle of the 1961 campaign, he was traded to the St. Louis Cardinals. After a half season with the Redbirds, he was selected by Houston in the 1961 MLB expansion draft.

Lillis then spent almost six full seasons as a shortstop and utility infielder for the Astros, serving as a coach for the first two weeks of 1967 before being activated as an infielder. Houston then released him at season's end. Over his ten-year MLB career, Lillis appeared in 817 games and batted .236 with three home runs; his 549 hits included 68 doubles and nine triples.

== Coaching and managing career ==
After scouting and player development posts with Houston from 1968 to 1972, Lillis returned to the Astro coaching staff in 1973 and served under managers Leo Durocher, Preston Gómez and Bill Virdon. On August 10, 1982, he succeeded Virdon as manager with the club in fifth place in the National League West Division with a record of 49–62. Lillis led the team to 28 wins in 51 games and was rehired for full seasons from 1983 to 1985.

Houston never climbed above second place, however, and even though Lillis compiled a winning 276–261 (.514) record during that period, he was replaced by Hal Lanier at the close of the 1985 campaign. The following year, Lanier would lead the Astros to a NL West title. Lillis then joined the coaching staff of a former Dodger teammate, Roger Craig, with the San Francisco Giants, and remained with the team for eleven years (through 1996).

Lillis is a member of the Pasadena Sports Hall of Fame.

== Managerial record ==
Team	Year	Regular season					Postseason			
Team	Year	Games	Won	Lost	Win %	Finish	Won	Lost	Win %	Result
HOU	1982	51	28	23	.549	5th in NL West	–	–	–	–
HOU	1983	162	85	77	.525	3rd in NL West	–	–	–	–
HOU	1984	162	80	82	.494	2nd in NL West	–	–	–	–
HOU	1985	162	83	79	.512	4th in NL West	–	–	–	–
Total		537	276	261	.514					

== See also ==
- List of Houston Astros team records
