= Don Cardwell =

American baseball player (1935–2008)

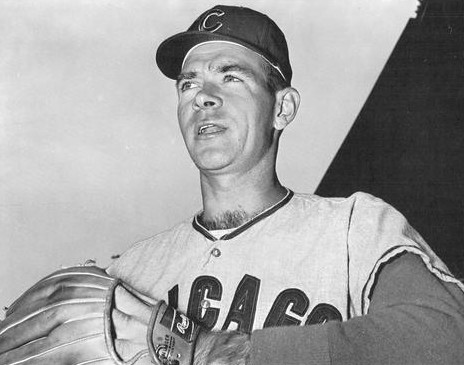
- Pitcher
- Born: December 7, 1935; Winston-Salem, North Carolina, U.S.
- Died: January 14, 2008 (aged 72); Winston-Salem, North Carolina, U.S.
- Batted: Right Threw: Right

MLB debut
- April 21, 1957, for the Philadelphia Phillies

Last MLB appearance
- September 27, 1970, for the Atlanta Braves

MLB statistics
- Win–loss record: 102–138
- Earned run average: 3.92
- Strikeouts: 1,211
- Stats at Baseball Reference

Teams
- Philadelphia Phillies (1957–1960); Chicago Cubs (1960–1962); Pittsburgh Pirates (1963–1966); New York Mets (1967–1970); Atlanta Braves (1970)

Career highlights and awards
- World Series champion (1969); Pitched a no-hitter on May 15, 1960

Donald Eugene Cardwell (December 7, 1935 – January 14, 2008) was an American Major League Baseball (MLB) right-handed pitcher who played for five National League (NL) teams from 1957 to 1970. He was the first pitcher in major league history to pitch a no-hitter in his first game after being traded. He pitched a no-hit, 4–0 winning game for the Chicago Cubs on May 15, 1960, just two days after being traded from the Philadelphia Phillies. After winning 15 games for the Cubs in 1961, he won 13 games twice for the Pittsburgh Pirates before helping the New York Mets win the 1969 World Series title.

Born in Winston-Salem, North Carolina, Cardwell signed with the Philadelphia Phillies as an amateur free agent in 1954.

== Major League career ==
=== Philadelphia Phillies ===
Cardwell began playing in the major leagues when he made his debut for the Phillies in 1957. He struggled during his three seasons with the team, winning 16 games while losing 24 as a spot starter.

=== Chicago Cubs (no-hitter) ===
Cardwell was traded to the Cubs on May 13, 1960, for Tony Taylor. Two days later, he no-hit the St. Louis Cardinals 4–0 in the second game of a doubleheader at Wrigley Field—the first no-hitter ever thrown by a pitcher in his first start with a new team. The lone baserunner for the Cardinals was by a walk from Cardwell to Alex Grammas with one out in the first inning; Cardwell then retired the next 26 batters. Two ninth-inning catches enabled Cardwell to secure the no-hitter: the first catch by Cubs right fielder George Altman on a Carl Sawatski line drive for the first out of the inning, and the second catch by Cubs left fielder Walt "Moose" Moryn on Joe Cunningham's sinking line drive to end the game, Moryn catching the ball just inches off the ground. Cardwell finished the season 9–16 and the Cubs 60–94 despite his no-hitter. Cardwell also showed his hitting ability in 1960, getting 16 hits including five home runs in 77 at bats for a .208 batting average.

Cardwell's best major league season was for the Cubs in 1961, winning a career-high 15 games with a career-high 156 strikeouts.

=== St. Louis Cardinals ===
Cardwell slumped to 7–16 in 1962. On October 12, he was traded with George Altman to the St. Louis Cardinals. However, his stay ended before he even pitched a game for the St. Louis team. A month later, the Cardinals traded him to the Pittsburgh Pirates in a deal that sent former National League MVP Dick Groat to the Redbirds.

=== Pittsburgh Pirates ===
Cardwell won 13 games for the Pirates in 1963 while posting a career-best 3.07 earned run average. He was sidelined most of the 1964 season with shoulder trouble. In the 1965 season, he rebounded to win 13 more games. In December 1966, he was traded with Pirates outfielder Don Bosch to the New York Mets for pitcher Dennis Ribant and utilityman Gary Kolb.

=== New York Mets ===
Pitching mostly as a spot starter, Cardwell went 12–22 in his first two seasons with the Mets. In the 1969 season, he went 8–10 in a rotation with pitchers Tom Seaver, Jerry Koosman, Nolan Ryan and Gary Gentry, helping them win the World Series. In late July of that year, he had a 3–9 record, then won five straight, including a 1–0 shutout in the second game of a September 12 doubleheader against the Pirates (in the first game, Koosman had also blanked the Pirates 1–0; both pitchers drove in the only run in their respective games). This victory, the ninth of a ten-game winning streak for the Mets, came two days after the Mets had taken over first place for good in the National League East (in 1969 the two leagues had been split into two divisions) by leapfrogging past the Chicago Cubs, who had been in first place for much of the season before stumbling down the stretch.

=== Atlanta Braves ===
Cardwell was sold to the Atlanta Braves in July 1970, where he ended his major league career. In his 14 major league seasons, he won 102 games while losing 138 games with 1,211 strikeouts in 2,122 2/3 innings pitched. Although only a career .135 hitter, Cardwell hit 15 home runs with 53 runs batted in.

== Death ==
Cardwell died on January 14, 2008, of Pick's disease in Winston-Salem. He had lived in Clemmons at the time of the death. He was interred in God's Acre Cemetery in Old Salem, North Carolina.

== See also ==
- List of Major League Baseball career hit batsmen leaders
- List of Major League Baseball all-time leaders in home runs by pitchers

Achievements
Preceded by Hoyt Wilhelm	No-hitter pitcher May 15, 1960	Succeeded by Lew Burdette
