= Houston Astros all-time roster =

List of baseball players

The following is a list of players, both past and current, who appeared at least in one game for the Houston Astros National League franchise (1965–2012) and current American League franchise (2013–present), also known previously as the Houston Colt .45's (1962–1964).

Players in bold are members of the National Baseball Hall of Fame.

Players in italics are members of the Houston Astros Hall of Fame.

== A ==
- Fernando Abad, RP (2010–2012)
- Reggie Abercrombie, CF (2008)
- Bobby Abreu, RF (1996–1997)
- Bryan Abreu, RP (2019–present)
- José Abreu, 1B (2023–2024)
- Juan Abreu, RP (2011)
- Dave Adlesh, C (1963–1968)
- Troy Afenir, C (1987)
- Tommie Agee, CF (1973)
- Juan Agosto, RP (1987–1990, 1993)
- Matt Albers, RP (2006–2007, 2014)
- Jason Alexander, SP (2025–2026)
- Jason Alfaro, SS (2004)
- Nick Allen, 2B (2026–present)
- Jesús Alou, RF (1969–1973, 1978–1979)
- Moisés Alou, LF (1998, 2000–2001)
- Jose Altuve, 2B (2011–present)
- Yordan Alvarez, DH (2019–present)
- Joey Amalfitano, 2B (1962)
- Jacob Amaya, 2B (2024)
- Héctor Ambriz, RP (2012–2013)
- Larry Andersen, RP (1986–1990)
- John Anderson, RP (1962)
- Josh Anderson, CF (2007)
- Rob Andrews, 2B (1975–1976)
- Joaquín Andújar, SP (1976–1981, 1988)
- Rick Ankiel, RF (2013)
- Eric Anthony, RF (1989–1993)
- Nori Aoki, LF (2017)
- Alberto Árias, RP (2008–2009)
- Don Arlich, RP (1965–1966)
- Rogelio Armenteros, SP (2019)
- Spencer Arrighetti, SP (2024–2026)
- Alan Ashby, C (1979–1989)
- Bob Aspromonte, 3B (1962–1968)
- Ezequiel Astacio, SP (2005–2006)
- Pedro Astacio, SP (2001)
- Brad Ausmus, C (1997–1998, 2001–2008)

== B ==
- Brandon Backe, SP (2004–2009)
- Pedro Báez, RP (2021–2022)
- **Jeff Bagwell**, 1B (1991–2005)
- Brandon Bailey, RP (2020)
- Mark Bailey, C (1984–1988)
- Paul Bako, C (1999–2000)
- Jeff Baldwin, LF (1990)
- Reggie Baldwin, C (1978–1979)
- Lee Bales, 2B (1967)
- Josh Banks, SP (2010)
- Alan Bannister, SS (1984)
- Floyd Bannister, SP (1977–1978)
- Rylan Bannon, 2B (2023)
- Glen Barker, CF (1999–2001)
- Mike Barlow, RP (1976)
- Clint Barmes, SS (2011)
- Brandon Barnes, CF (2012–2013)
- Manuel Barrios, RP (1997)
- Jorge Barrosa, LF (2026–present)
- Philip Barzilla, RP (2006)
- Anthony Bass, RP (2014)
- Kevin Bass, RF (1982–1989, 1993–1994)
- John Bateman, C (1963–1968)
- Rafael Batista, 1B (1973, 1975)
- Yorman Bazardo, SP (2009)
- Jim Beauchamp, LF (1964–1965, 1970)
- Érik Bédard, SP (2013)
- Bo Belinsky, SP (1967)
- Buddy Bell, 3B (1988)
- Derek Bell, RF (1995–1999)
- Eric Bell, RP (1993)
- **Carlos Beltrán**, CF (2004, 2017)
- Dave Bergman, 1B (1978–1981)
- Sean Bergman, SP (1998–1999)
- Lance Berkman, OF/1B (1999–2010)
- Dale Berra, SS (1987)
- Sean Berry, 3B (1996–1998)
- Joe Biagini, RP (2019–2020)
- Buddy Biancalana, SS (1988)
- Brandon Bielak, RP (2020–2024)
- **Craig Biggio**, 2B/C/OF (1988–2007)
- Jack Billingham, SP (1969–1971)
- Brian Bixler, 2B (2012)
- George Bjorkman, C (1983)
- Travis Blackley, RP (2013)
- Willie Blair, RP (1992)
- Ronel Blanco, SP (2022–present)
- Nate Bland, RP (2003)
- Wade Blasingame, SP (1967–1972)
- Curt Blefary, 1B (1969)
- Jake Bloss, SP (2024)
- AJ Blubaugh, SP (2025–present)
- Geoff Blum, 3B (2002–2003, 2008–2010)
- Bruce Bochy, C (1978–1980)
- Joe Boever, RP (1992)
- Tim Bogar, SS (1997–2000)
- Brian Bogusevic, RF (2010–2012)
- Cody Bolton, RP (2026)
- Walt Bond, 1B (1964–1965)
- Aaron Boone, 3B (2009)
- Danny Boone, RP (1982)
- Pedro Borbón Jr., RP (2001)
- Pat Borders, C (1995)
- Dave Borkowski, RP (2006–2008)
- Ken Boswell, 2B (1975–1977)
- Kent Bottenfield, SP (2001)
- Jason Bourgeois, CF (2010–2011)
- Michael Bourn, CF (2008–2011)
- Jim Bouton, RP (1969–1970)
- Ryan Bowen, SP (1991–1992)
- Don Bradey, RP (1964)
- Ron Brand, C (1965–1968)
- Jackie Brandt, 1B (1967)
- Michael Brantley, LF (2019–2023)
- Sid Bream, 1B (1994)
- Alex Bregman, 3B (2016–2024)
- Doug Brocail, RP (1995–1996, 2008–2009)
- Hal Brown, SP (1963–1964)
- Hunter Brown, SP (2022–present)
- Ollie Brown, RF (1974)
- Byron Browne, RF (1968)
- Pidge Browne, 1B (1962)
- Bob Bruce, SP (1962–1966)
- Mike Brumley, LF (1993, 1995)
- George Brunet, SP (1962–1963)
- Eric Bruntlett, UT (2003–2007)
- Don Bryant, C (1969–1970)
- Jake Buchanan, RP (2014–2015)
- Taylor Buchholz, SP (2006)
- Travis Buck, LF (2012)
- Don Buddin, SS (1962)
- Kirk Bullinger, RP (2003–2004)
- Eric Bullock, LF (1985–1986)
- Chris Burke, LF (2004–2007)
- Mike Burns, RP (2005)
- Mike Burrows, SP (2026–present)
- Jim Busby, CF (1962)
- Ray Busse, SS (1971, 1973–1974)
- John Buzhardt, RP (1967–1968)
- Tim Byrdak, RP (2008–2010)

== C ==
- Trey Cabbage, RF (2024)
- Enos Cabell, 3B (1975–1980, 1984–1985)
- José Cabrera, RP (1997–2000)
- Craig Cacek, 1B (1977)
- Jeff Calhoun, RP (1984–1986)
- Ernie Camacho, RP (1988)
- Ken Caminiti, 3B (1987–1994, 1999–2000)
- Dave Campbell, 3B (1973–1974)
- Jim Campbell, C (1962–1963)
- Robinson Cancel, C (2011)
- Casey Candaele, 2B (1988, 1990–1993)
- John Cangelosi, LF (1995–1996)
- Joe Cannon, LF (1977–1978)
- José Canó, SP (1989)
- Mike Capel, RP (1991)
- George Cappuzzello, RP (1982)
- Víctor Caratini, C (2024–2025)
- Conrad Cardinal, RP (1963)
- David Carpenter, RP (2011–2012)
- Frank Carpin, RP (1966)
- Chuck Carr, CF (1997)
- Chris Carter, 1B (2013–2015)
- Kevin Cash, C (2010)
- Jack Cassel, RP (2008)
- Humberto Castellanos, RP (2020)
- Vinny Castilla, 3B (2001)
- José Castillo, 3B (2008)
- Jason Castro, C (2010, 2012–2016, 2021–2022)
- Andújar Cedeño, SS (1990–1994, 1996)
- César Cedeño, CF (1970–1981)
- Roger Cedeño, CF (2000)
- Ronny Cedeño, SS (2013)
- Xavier Cedeño, RP (2011–2013)
- Juan Centeno, C (2017)
- Bob Cerv, LF (1962)
- Gustavo Chacín, RP (2010)
- Shawn Chacón, SP (2008)
- Kevin Chapman, RP (2013–2016)
- Frank Charles, C (2000)
- Raúl Chávez, C (2000, 2002–2005)
- Bruce Chen, RP (2003)
- Rocky Childress, RP (1987–1988)
- Rich Chiles, LF (1971–1972, 1976)
- Robinson Chirinos, C (2019)
- Al Cicotte, RP (1962)
- José Cisnero, RP (2013–2014)
- Jim Clancy, SP (1989–1991)
- Cody Clark, C (2013)
- Dave Clark, RF (1998)
- Terry Clark, RP (1990, 1996)
- Paul Clemens, RP (2013–2014)
- Roger Clemens, SP (2004–2006)
- Tyler Clippard, RP (2017)
- Nate Colbert, 1B (1966, 1968)
- Gerrit Cole, SP (2018–2019)
- Zach Cole, LF (2025–present)
- Dylan Coleman, RP (2024)
- Hank Conger, C (2015)
- Luis Contreras, RP (2024–2025)
- Ron Cook, RP (1970–1971)
- Danny Coombs, RP (1963–1969)
- Gary Cooper, 3B (1991)
- Francisco Cordero, RP (2012)
- Kenedy Corona, CF (2025)
- Carlos Corporán, C (2011–2014)
- Carlos Correa, SS (2015–2021, 2025–present)
- Jim Corsi, RP (1991)
- Jarred Cosart, SP (2013–2014)
- Mike Cosgrove, RP (1972–1975)
- Chris Coste, C (2009)
- Jim Crawford, RP (1973, 1975)
- Willie Crawford, LF (1977)
- Trevor Crowe, RF (2013)
- Tripp Cromer, 2B (2000, 2003)
- José Cruz, LF (1975–1987)
- José Cruz Jr., LF (2008)
- Nelson Cruz, RP (2001–2002)
- Rhiner Cruz, RP (2012–2013)
- Mike Cuellar, SP (1965–1968)
- George Culver, RP (1970–1972)

== D ==
- Jay Dahl, SP (1963)
- Casey Daigle, RP (2010)
- Danny Darwin, SP (1986–1990, 1996)
- Jack Daugherty, RF (1993)
- Jerry DaVanon, SS (1975–1976)
- Mark Davidson, RF (1989–1991)
- Brock Davis, CF (1963–1964, 1966)
- Glenn Davis, 1B (1984–1990)
- J. D. Davis, 3B (2017–2018)
- Ron Davis, CF (1962, 1966–1968)
- Tommy Davis, LF (1969–1970)
- Bill Dawley, RP (1983–1985)
- Ronnie Dawson, DH (2021)
- Alex De Goti, 2B (2021)
- Chase De Jong, SP (2020)
- Jesús de la Rosa, PH (1975)
- Jorge de León, RP (2013–2014)
- Enyel De Los Santos, RP (2025–present)
- Ramón de los Santos, RP (1974)
- Sam Deduno, RP (2014–2015)
- Dean Deetz, RP (2018)
- Enerio Del Rosario, RP (2010–2012)
- Ray Delgado, 3B (2026–present)
- Jim Deshaies, SP (1985–1991)
- Chris Devenski, RP (2016–2020)
- Zach Dezenzo, 1B (2024–present)
- Aledmys Díaz, UT (2019–2022, 2024)
- Alex Diaz, LF (1999)
- Dayán Díaz, RP (2017)
- Miguel Díaz, RP (2024)
- Yainer Díaz, C (2022–present)
- Jim Dickson, RP (1963)
- Larry Dierker, SP (1964–1976)
- Jack DiLauro, RP (1970)
- Frank DiPino, RP (1982–1986)
- Benny Distefano, LF (1992)
- Tom Dixon, SP (1977–1979)
- Matt Dominguez, 3B (2012–2014)
- Chris Donnels, 3B (1993–1995)
- Bill Doran, 2B (1982–1990)
- Octavio Dotel, RP (2000–2004)
- Jim Dougherty, RP (1995)
- Darin Downs, RP (2014)
- Matt Downs, 2B (2010–2012)
- Doug Drabek, SP (1993–1996)
- Cameron Drew, LF (1988)
- Dan Driessen, 1B (1986)
- Travis Driskill, RP (2005, 2007)
- Dick Drott, RP (1962–1963)
- Keith Drumright, 2B (1978)
- Shawn Dubin, RP (2023–2025)
- Mauricio Dubón, UT (2022–2025)
- Brandon Duckworth, RP (2004–2005)
- Matt Duffy, 3B (2015–2016)
- Tom Dukes, RP (1967–1968)
- Luis Durango, CF (2011)

== E ==
- Arnold Earley, RP (1967)
- Mike Easler, LF (1973–1975)
- Tom Edens, RP (1993–1994)
- Johnny Edwards, C (1969–1974)
- Dave Eilers, RP (1967)
- Scott Elarton, SP (1998–2001)
- Jake Elmore, UT (2013)
- Kent Emanuel, RP (2021)
- Morgan Ensberg, 3B (2000–2007)
- Darin Erstad, CF (2008–2009)
- Sergio Escalona, RP (2011)
- Brian Esposito, C (2010)
- Tony Eusebio, C (1991, 1994–2001)
- Adam Everett, SS (2001–2007)
- Carl Everett, CF (1998–1999)

== F ==
- Kyle Farnsworth, RP (2014)
- Turk Farrell, SP (1962–1967)
- Ernie Fazio, 2B (1962–1963)
- Tim Federowicz, C (2018)
- Mike Felder, RF (1994)
- Scott Feldman, SP (2014–2016)
- Michael Feliz, RP (2015–2017)
- Pedro Feliz, 3B (2010)
- Bobby Fenwick, 2B (1972)
- Caleb Ferguson, RP (2024)
- Joe Ferguson, C (1977–1978)
- Jared Fernández, SP (2003–2004)
- Sid Fernández, SP (1997)
- Chuckie Fick, RP (2012)
- Josh Fields, RP (2013–2016)
- Mike Fiers, SP (2015–2017)
- Nelson Figueroa, SP (2010–2011)
- Steve Finley, CF (1991–1994)
- Mike Fischlin, SS (1977–1978, 1980)
- John Fishel, LF (1988)
- Brian Fisher, RP (1990)
- Derek Fisher, LF (2017–2019)
- Doug Fister, SP (2016)
- Mike Foltynewicz, RP (2014)
- Bob Forsch, SP (1988–1989)
- Ken Forsch, SP (1970–1980)
- Dexter Fowler, CF (2014)
- **Nellie Fox**, 2B (1964–1965)
- J. P. France, SP (2023–2026)
- Ben Francisco, RF (2012)
- John Franco, RP (2005)
- Wayne Franklin, RP (2000–2001)
- Gene Freese, 3B (1967)
- Jeff Fulchino, RP (2009–2011)
- Jim Fuller, LF (1977)
- Tom Funk, RP (1986)

== G ==
- Matt Gage, RP (2023)
- Joe Gaines, RF (1964–1966)
- Ty Gainey, CF (1985–1987)
- Armando Galarraga, SP (2012)
- Bob Gallagher, RF (1973–1974)
- Mike Gallo, RP (2003–2006)
- Ben Gamel, RF (2024)
- Kiko García, SS (1981–1982)
- Luis García, SP (2020–2023, 2025)
- Ramón García, SP (1997)
- Robel García, 3B (2021)
- Yimi García, RP (2021)
- Art Gardner, LF (1975, 1977)
- Chris Gardner, SP (1991)
- Dustin Garneau, C (2020)
- Phil Garner, 3B (1981–1987)
- Ralph Garza, RP (2021)
- Evan Gattis, DH (2015–2018)
- Geoff Geary, RP (2008–2009)
- Rich Gedman, C (1990)
- Gary Geiger, LF (1969–1970)
- Jim Gentile, 1B (1965–1966)
- Dick Gernert, 1B (1962)
- César Gerónimo, LF (1969–1971)
- Sammy Gervacio, RP (2009–2010)
- Joe Gibbon, RP (1972)
- Ken Giles, RP (2016–2018)
- Hal Gilson, RP (1968)
- Héctor Giménez, PH (2006)
- Keith Ginter, 2B (2000–2002)
- Charles Gipson, LF (2005)
- Dave Giusti, 2B (1962, 1964–1968)
- Fred Gladding, RP (1968–1973)
- Jerry Goff, C (1995–1996)
- Jim Golden, SP (1962–1963)
- Carlos Gómez, CF (2015–2016)
- Édgar González, SP (2012–2013)
- Julio González, SS (1977–1980)
- Luis González, LF (1990–1995, 1997)
- Marwin González, UT (2012–2018, 2021)
- Dwight Gooden, SP (2000)
- Billy Goodman, 2B (1962)
- Niko Goodrum, 2B (2022)
- Colton Gordon, SP (2025–2026)
- Tom Gordon, RP (2002)
- Howie Goss, CF (1963)
- Julio Gotay, 2B (1966–1969)
- Wayne Granger, RP (1975)
- Mark Grant, RP (1993)
- Kendall Graveman, RP (2021, 2023)
- Jason Green, RP (2000)
- Tommy Greene, SP (1997)
- Tyler Greene, SS (2012)
- Luke Gregerson, RP (2015–2017)
- Bill Greif, SP (1971)
- Zack Greinke, SP (2019–2021)
- Tom Griffin, SP (1969–1976)
- Jeremy Griffiths, SP (2004)
- Greg Gross, RF (1973–1976, 1989)
- Kip Gross, RP (2000)
- Robbie Grossman, LF (2013–2015)
- Jerry Grote, C (1963–1964)
- Mike Grzanich, RP (1998)
- Reymin Guduan, RP (2017–2019)
- Juan Guerrero, SS (1992)
- Luis Guillorme, 3B (2025)
- Skip Guinn, RP (1969, 1971)
- Bill Gullickson, SP (1990)
- Yuli Gurriel, 1B (2016–2022)
- Jandel Gustave, RP (2016–2017)
- Ryan Gusto, SP (2025)
- Juan Gutiérrez, SP (2007)
- Ricky Gutiérrez, SS (1995–1999)
- Jesús Guzmán, 1B (2014)

== H ==
- Josh Hader, RP (2024–present)
- Dave Hajek, 3B (1995–1996)
- John Halama, SP (1998)
- Bill Hall, 2B (2011)
- Mike Hampton, SP (1994–1999, 2009)
- J. A. Happ, SP (2010–2012)
- Carroll Hardy, CF (1963–1964)
- Larry Hardy, RP (1976)
- Pete Harnisch, SP (1991–1994)
- Lucas Harrell, SP (2011–2014)
- Buddy Harris, RP (1970–1971)
- Candy Harris, PR (1967)
- Dustin Harris, LF (2026)
- Reggie Harris, RP (1998)
- Will Harris, RP (2015–2019)
- Chuck Harrison, 1B (1965–1967)
- Dean Hartgraves, RP (1995–1996)
- J. C. Hartman, SS (1962–1963)
- Ryan Hartman, RP (2021)
- Chad Harville, RP (2004–2005)
- Billy Hatcher, CF (1986–1989)
- LaTroy Hawkins, RP (2008–2009)
- Charlie Hayes, 3B (2001)
- Bill Heath, C (1966–1967)
- Jeff Heathcock, RP (1983, 1985, 1987–1988)
- Danny Heep, 1B (1979–1982)
- Al Heist, CF (1962)
- Tommy Helms, 2B (1972–1975)
- Steve Henderson, LF (1988)
- Josh Hendrickson, RP (2026–present)
- Blair Henley, SP (2024)
- Mike Henneman, RP (1995)
- Randy Hennis, RP (1990)
- Oscar Henríquez, RP (1997)
- Bill Henry, RP (1969)
- Butch Henry, SP (1992)
- Doug Henry, RP (1998–2000)
- Dwayne Henry, RP (1991)
- David Hensley, 2B (2022–2023)
- Anderson Hernández, 2B (2010)
- Carlos Hernández, 2B (1999)
- Carlos Hernández, SP (2001–2002, 2004)
- Kike Hernández, CF (2014)
- Manny Hernández, RP (1986–1987)
- Nick Hernandez, RP (2024–2025)
- Roberto Hernández, SP (2015)
- Runelvys Hernández, SP (2008)
- Teoscar Hernández, CF (2016–2017)
- Xavier Hernandez, RP (1990–1993, 1996)
- José Herrera, RF (1967–1968)
- Ed Herrmann, C (1976–1978)
- Steve Hertz, 3B (1964)
- Jason Heyward, RF (2024)
- Jack Hiatt, C (1971–1972)
- Richard Hidalgo, RF (1997–2004)
- Jason Hirsh, SP (2006)
- Joe Hoerner, RP (1963–1964)
- L. J. Hoes, RF (2013–2015)
- John Hoffman, C (1964–1965)
- Chris Holt, SP (1996–1997, 1999–2000)
- J. R. House, C (2006, 2008)
- Pat House, RP (1967–1968)
- Paul Householder, CF (1987)
- Larry Howard, C (1970–1973)
- Thomas Howard, CF (1997)
- Wilbur Howard, LF (1974–1978)
- Art Howe, 3B (1976–1982)
- Jack Howell, 1B (1998–1999)
- James Hoyt, RP (2016–2018)
- John Hudek, RP (1994–1997)
- Aubrey Huff, 3B (2006)
- Philip Humber, SP (2013)
- Cooper Hummel, LF (2024–2025)
- Brian Hunter, CF (1994–1996, 2002–2003)

== I ==
- Tatsuya Imai, SP (2026–present)
- Pete Incaviglia, LF (1992, 1998)
- Joe Inglett, 2B (2011)
- Tyler Ivey, SP (2021)
- Mike Ivie, 1B (1981–1982)

== J ==
- Chuck Jackson, 3B (1987–1988)
- Mike Jackson, RP (2001)
- Sonny Jackson, SS (1963–1967)
- Chris James, RF (1993)
- Josh James, RP (2018–2021)
- Jordan Jankowski, RP (2017)
- Al Javier, LF (1976)
- Cristian Javier, SP (2020–present)
- Stan Javier, RF (1999)
- Jason Jennings, SP (2007)
- Charlton Jimerson, CF (2005–2006)
- Chris Johnson, 3B (2009–2012)
- Cliff Johnson, C (1972–1977)
- Daniel Johnson, CF (2026)
- Jerry Johnson, RP (1974)
- Jonathan Johnson, SP (2003)
- Ken Johnson, SP (1962–1965)
- **Randy Johnson**, SP (1998)
- Russ Johnson, 3B (1997–2000)
- John Johnstone, RP (1996)
- Chris Jones, CF (1985)
- Chris Jones, RF (1992)
- Doug Jones, RP (1992–1993)
- Gordon Jones, RP (1964–1965)
- Jimmy Jones, SP (1991–1992)
- Taylor Jones, 1B (2020–2022)
- Todd Jones, RP (1993–1996)
- Jeff Juden, SP (1991, 1993)
- Corey Julks, LF (2023)
- Skip Jutze, C (1973–1976)

== K ==
- Eddie Kasko, SS (1964–1965)
- Matt Kata, 2B (2009)
- Scott Kazmir, SP (2015)
- Mick Kelleher, SS (1976)
- Russ Kemmerer, RP (1962–1963)
- Tony Kemp, LF (2016–2019)
- **Jeff Kent**, 2B (2003–2004)
- Matt Keough, RP (1986)
- Jeff Keppinger, 2B (2009–2011)
- Charlie Kerfeld, RP (1985–1987, 1990)
- Grae Kessinger, 3B (2023–2024)
- Dallas Keuchel, SP (2012–2018)
- Yusei Kikuchi, SP (2024)
- Darryl Kile, SP (1991–1997)
- Craig Kimbrel, RP (2025)
- Bryan King, RP (2024–present)
- Hal King, C (1967–1968)
- Bob Knepper, SP (1981–1989)
- Alan Knicely, C (1979–1982)
- Ray Knight, 1B (1982–1984)
- Randy Knorr, C (1996–1997, 1999)
- Mark Knudson, SP (1985–1986)
- Doug Konieczny, SP (1973–1975, 1977)
- Erik Kratz, C (2016)
- Marc Krauss, LF (2013–2014)
- Gary Kroll, RP (1966)
- Joel Kuhnel, RP (2023–2024)

== L ==
- Frank LaCorte, RP (1979–1983)
- Mike LaCoss, SP (1982–1984)
- Pete Ladd, RP (1979)
- Brandon Laird, 3B (2012–2013)
- Jack Lamabe, SP (1965)
- Mike Lamb, 1B (2004–2007)
- Peter Lambert, SP (2026–present)
- Keith Lampard, LF (1969–1970)
- Rafael Landestoy, 2B (1978–1981)
- Jim Landis, LF (1967)
- Jason Lane, RF (2002–2007)
- Norm Larker, 1B (1962)
- Don Larsen, SP (1964–1965)
- Dan Larson, SP (1976–1977)
- Barry Latman, RP (1966–1967)
- Wade LeBlanc, RP (2013)
- Carlos Lee, LF (2007–2012)
- Don Lee, RP (1966)
- Korey Lee, C (2022)
- Denny Lemaster, SP (1968–1971)
- Mark Lemongello, SP (1976–1978)
- Pedro León, RF (2024)
- Jeffrey Leonard, RF (1978–1981)
- Brad Lidge, RP (2002–2007)
- Bob Lillis, SS (1962–1967)
- José Lima, SP (1997–2001)
- Jim Lindeman, 1B (1993)
- Matt Lindstrom, RP (2010)
- Scott Linebrink, RP (2000–2003)
- Francisco Liriano, RP (2017)
- Pat Listach, SS (1997)
- Chia-Jen Lo, RP (2013)
- Kenny Lofton, CF (1991)
- Steve Lombardozzi, 2B (1989–1990)
- Joey Loperfido, LF (2024, 2026–present)
- Davey Lopes, LF (1986–1987)
- Aurelio López, RP (1986–1987)
- Mendy López, 2B (2001)
- Wilton López, RP (2009–2012)
- Mark Loretta, 2B (2002, 2007–2008)
- Jed Lowrie, SS (2012, 2015)
- Scott Loucks, CF (1980–1983)
- Julio Lugo, SS (2000–2003)
- Jordan Lyles, SP (2011–2013)
- Brandon Lyon, RP (2010–2012)

== M ==
- Ken MacKenzie, RP (1965)
- Mike Madden, RP (1983–1986)
- Mike Maddux, RP (2000)
- Bligh Madris, 1B (2023)
- Dave Magadan, 3B (1995)
- Mike Magnante, RP (1997–1998)
- Jim Mahoney, SS (1965)
- Gary Majewski, RP (2010)
- Martín Maldonado, C (2018–2023)
- Rob Mallicoat, RP (1987, 1991–1992)
- Trey Mancini, 1B (2022)
- Jim Mann, RP (2001–2002)
- Félix Mantilla, 3B (1966)
- Kirt Manwaring, C (1996)
- Tommy Manzella, SS (2009–2010)
- Jake Marisnick, CF (2014–2019)
- Mike Marshall, RP (1970)
- Francis Martes, RP (2017)
- Corbin Martin, SP (2019)
- Tom Martin, RP (1997)
- David Martinez, RP (2013–2014)
- Fernando Martínez, RF (2012–2013)
- J. D. Martinez, LF (2011–2013)
- Marty Martínez, SS (1969–1971)
- Pedro A. Martínez, RP (1995)
- Seth Martinez, RP (2021–2024)
- Roger Mason, RP (1989)
- **Eddie Mathews**, 1B (1967)
- T. J. Mathews, RP (2002)
- Ron Mathis, RP (1985, 1987)
- J. J. Matijevic, 1B (2022)
- Phil Maton, RP (2021–2023)
- Dave Matranga, 2B (2003)
- Kazuo Matsui, 2B (2008–2010)
- Brice Matthews, 2B (2025–present)
- Justin Maxwell, CF (2012–2013)
- Derrick May, LF (1995–1996)
- Lee May, 1B (1972–1974)
- Milt May, C (1974–1975)
- John Mayberry, 1B (1968–1971)
- Cameron Maybin, CF (2017)
- Lee Maye, LF (1965–1966)
- Jack Mayfield, 2B (2019–2020)
- Edwin Maysonet, 2B (2008–2009)
- Brian McCann, C (2017–2018)
- Chas McCormick, CF (2021–2025)
- Lance McCullers Jr., SP (2015–2018, 2020–2022, 2025–2026)
- Jeff McCurry, RP (1999)
- Joe McEwing, 2B (2006)
- Leon McFadden, SS (1968–1970)
- Terry McGriff, C (1990)
- Collin McHugh, SP (2014–2019)
- Tony McKnight, SP (2000–2001)
- Bo McLaughlin, RP (1976–1979)
- Mark McLemore, 2B (1991)
- Mark McLemore, RP (2007)
- Don McMahon, RP (1962–1963)
- Craig McMurtry, RP (1995)
- Rusty Meacham, RP (2000)
- Louie Meadows, LF (1986, 1988–1990)
- Dave Meads, RP (1987–1988)
- Román Mejías, RF (1962)
- Mark Melancon, RP (2010–2011)
- Jacob Melton, CF (2025)
- Mitch Meluskey, C (1998–2000, 2003)
- Mike Mendoza, RP (1979)
- Denis Menke, SS (1968–1971, 1974)
- Orlando Merced, RF (2001–2003)
- Roger Metzger, SS (1971–1978)
- Brian Meyer, RP (1988–1990)
- Jake Meyers, CF (2021–2026)
- Dan Miceli, RP (2003–2004)
- Jason Michaels, LF (2009–2011)
- Matt Mieske, LF (1999–2000)
- Larry Milbourne, 2B (1974–1976)
- Wade Miley, SP (2019)
- Norm Miller, RF (1965–1973)
- Orlando Miller, SS (1994–1996)
- Trever Miller, RP (1998–1999, 2006–2007)
- Wade Miller, SP (1999–2004)
- Blas Minor, RP (1997)
- John Mizerock, C (1983, 1985–1986)
- Dave Mlicki, SP (2001–2002)
- Brian Moehler, SP (2003, 2007–2010)
- Randy Moffitt, RP (1982)
- Rafael Montalvo, RP (1986)
- Aurelio Monteagudo, RP (1966)
- Rafael Montero, RP (2021–2025)
- Ray Montgomery, RF (1996–1998)
- Colin Moran, 3B (2016–2017)
- Omar Moreno, CF (1983)
- **Joe Morgan**, 2B (1963–1971, 1980)
- Alvin Morman, RP (1996)
- Charlie Morton, SP (2017–2018)
- Scott Moore, 3B (2012)
- Andy Mota, 2B (1991)
- James Mouton, CF (1994–1997)
- Jerry Mumphrey, CF (1983–1985)
- Roddery Muñoz, RP (2026)
- Peter Munro, SP (2003–2004)
- Eric Munson, C (2006–2007)
- Rob Murphy, RP (1992)
- Jayden Murray, RP (2025–2026)
- Ivan Murrell, LF (1963–1964, 1967–1968)
- Joe Musgrove, SP (2016–2017)
- Parker Mushinski, RP (2022–2024)
- Brett Myers, SP (2010–2012)

== N ==
- Mike Nagy, RP (1974)
- Oswaldo Navarro, SS (2010)
- Héctor Neris, RP (2022–2025)
- Pat Neshek, RP (2015–2016)
- Phil Nevin, 3B (1995)
- David Newhan, 2B (2008)
- Carl Nichols, C (1989–1991)
- Dave Nicholson, RF (1966)
- Joe Niekro, SP (1975–1985)
- Randy Niemann, RP (1979–1980)
- Fernando Nieve, RP (2006, 2008)
- C. J. Nitkowski, RP (1998)
- Bud Norris, SP (2009–2013)
- Don Nottebart, SP (1963–1965)

== O ==
- Brett Oberholtzer, SP (2013–2015)
- Ken Oberkfell, 3B (1990–1991)
- Jim Obradovich, 1B (1978)
- Jake Odorizzi, SP (2021–2022)
- Steven Okert, RP (2025–present)
- Darren Oliver, RP (2004)
- Gregg Olson, RP (1996)
- Kaleb Ort, RP (2024–2025)
- Javier Ortiz, RF (1990–1991)
- Russ Ortiz, SP (2009)
- Dan Osinski, RP (1990)
- Claude Osteen, SP (1974)
- Al Osuna, RP (1990–1993)
- Roberto Osuna, RP (2018–2020)
- Roy Oswalt, SP (2001–2010)
- Jim Owens, RP (1964–1967)
- Rudy Owens, SP (2014)

== P ==
- John Paciorek, RF (1963)
- Matt Pagnozzi, C (2013)
- Orlando Palmeiro, RF (2004–2007)
- Jim Pankovits, 2B (1984–1988)
- Enoli Paredes, RP (2020–2022)
- Isaac Paredes, 3B (2025–present)
- Jimmy Paredes, 3B (2011–2013)
- Rick Parker, CF (1993)
- Chad Paronto, RP (2008–2009)
- Troy Patton, SP (2007)
- David Paulino, SP (2016–2017)
- Felipe Paulino, SP (2007, 2009–2010)
- Brad Peacock, SP (2013–2020)
- Steve Pearce, 1B (2012)
- Nate Pearson, RP (2026)
- Ethan Pecko, SP (2026–present)
- Bert Peña, SS (1981, 1983–1987)
- Carlos Peña, 1B (2013)
- Jeremy Peña, SS (2022–present)
- Tony Peña, C (1997)
- Hunter Pence, RF (2007–2011)
- Jim Pendleton, LF (1962)
- Lance Pendleton, RP (2011)
- Gene Pentz, RP (1976–1978)
- Joe Pepitone, 1B (1970)
- Cionel Pérez, RP (2018–2020)
- Joe Perez, 3B (2022)
- Óliver Pérez, RP (2015)
- Tomás Pérez, 2B (2008)
- Yorkis Pérez, RP (2000)
- Roberto Petagine, 1B (1994)
- Gregorio Petit, SS (2014)
- Andy Pettitte, SP (2004–2006)
- J. R. Phillips, 1B (1997–1998)
- Hipólito Pichardo, RP (2002)
- Joe Pittman, 2B (1981–1982)
- Juan Pizarro, RP (1973)
- Gordie Pladson, RP (1979–1982)
- Phil Plantier, RF (1995)
- Aaron Pointer, LF (1963, 1966–1967)
- Colin Porter, CF (2003)
- Mark Portugal, SP (1989–1993)
- Brian Powell, SP (2001)
- Jay Powell, RP (1998–2001)
- Ross Powell, RP (1994–1995)
- Alex Presley, LF (2014–2015)
- Ryan Pressly, RP (2018–2024)
- Collin Price, C (2026–present)
- Austin Pruitt, RP (2021)
- Brandon Puffer, RP (2002–2003)
- Terry Puhl, RF (1977–1990)
- Luis Pujols, C (1977–1983)

== Q ==
- Chad Qualls, RP (2004–2007, 2014–2015)
- Humberto Quintero, C (2005–2011)

== R ==
- Doug Rader, 3B (1967–1975)
- Brooks Raley, RP (2020–2021)
- Rafael Ramírez, SS (1988–1992)
- Ken Ramos, LF (1997)
- Stephen Randolph, RP (2007)
- Merritt Ranew, C (1962)
- Cody Ransom, SS (2007)
- Colby Rasmus, LF (2015–2016)
- Gene Ratliff, PH (1965)
- Jim Ray, RP (1965–1966, 1968–1973)
- Larry Ray, RF (1982)
- Claude Raymond, RP (1964–1967)
- Josh Reddick, RF (2017–2020)
- Tim Redding, SP (2001–2004)
- A. J. Reed, 1B (2016–2018)
- Howie Reed, SP (1967)
- Jerry Reuss, SP (1972–1973)
- Craig Reynolds, SS (1979–1989)
- Ronn Reynolds, C (1987)
- Shane Reynolds, SP (1992–2002)
- Rick Rhoden, SP (1989)
- Tuffy Rhodes, RF (1990–1993)
- Frank Riccelli, RP (1978–1979)
- J. R. Richard, SP (1971–1980)
- Mike Richardt, PH (1984)
- Ernest Riles, SS (1992)
- Germán Rivera, 3B (1985)
- Luis Rivera, SS (1997)
- Christian Roa, RP (2026)
- Bert Roberge, RP (1979–1980, 1982)
- Dave Roberts, 1B (1962, 1964)
- Dave Roberts, 1B (1981)
- Dave Roberts, SP (1972–1975)
- Leon Roberts, LF (1976–1977)
- **Robin Roberts**, SP (1965–1966)
- Jeriome Robertson, SP (2002–2003)
- Brady Rodgers, RP (2016, 2019)
- Brendan Rodgers, 2B (2025)
- Aneury Rodríguez, RP (2011–2012)
- Fernando Rodriguez, RP (2011–2012)
- **Iván Rodríguez**, C (2009)
- Nivaldo Rodríguez, RP (2020–2021)
- Wandy Rodríguez, SP (2005–2012)
- Wilfredo Rodríguez, RP (2001)
- Dave Rohde, 2B (1990–1991)
- Gilberto Rondón, SP (1976)
- Héctor Rondón, RP (2018–2019)
- John Rooney, RP (2025)
- Rodrigo Rosario, SP (2003)
- Mark Ross, RP (1982, 1984–1985)
- Vern Ruhle, SP (1978–1984)
- Pete Runnels, 1B (1963–1964)
- **Nolan Ryan**, SP (1980–1988)

== S ==
- Kirk Saarloos, SP (2002–2003)
- Mark Saccomanno, 1B (2008)
- Billy Sadler, RP (2009)
- César Salazar, C (2023–2026)
- Joe Sambito, RP (1976–1982, 1984)
- Chris Sampson, RP (2006–2010)
- Carlos Sanabria, RP (2020)
- Aaron Sanchez, SP (2019)
- Ángel Sánchez, SS (2010–2011)
- Jesús Sánchez, LF (2025)
- Alimber Santa, RP (2026–present)
- Domingo Santana, RF (2014–2015)
- Dennis Sarfate, RP (2007)
- Bob Scanlan, RP (1998)
- Jordan Schafer, CF (2011–2012)
- Dan Schatzeder, RP (1989–1990)
- Rich Scheid, RP (1992)
- Fred Scherman, RP (1974–1975)
- Curt Schilling, RP (1991)
- Jay Schlueter, LF (1971)
- Dan Schneider, RP (1967, 1969)
- Pete Schourek, SP (1998)
- Luke Scott, RF (2005–2007)
- Mike Scott, SP (1983–1991)
- Tayler Scott, RP (2024–2025)
- Tony Scott, CF (1981–1984)
- Andre Scrubb, RP (2020–2021)
- Todd Self, RF (2005)
- Carroll Sembera, RP (1965–1967)
- Scott Servais, C (1991–1995, 2001)
- Jimmy Sexton, SS (1978–1979)
- Bobby Shantz, SP (1962)
- Steve Shea, RP (1968)
- Larry Sherry, RP (1967)
- Braden Shewmake, SS (2026)
- Craig Shipley, 3B (1995)
- Zack Short, SS (2025)
- J. B. Shuck, LF (2011)
- Paul Siebert, RP (1974–1976)
- Mike Simms, RF (1990–1992, 1994–1996)
- Dick Simpson, RF (1968)
- Greg Sims, LF (1966)
- Jon Singleton, 1B (2014–2015, 2023–2025)
- Tony Sipp, RP (2014–2018)
- José Siri, CF (2021–2022)
- Joe Slusarski, RP (1999–2001)
- Craig Smajstrla, 2B (1988)
- Mark Small, RP (1996)
- Billy Smith, RP (1981)
- Cam Smith, RF (2025–present)
- Dave Smith, RP (1980–1990)
- Hal Smith, C (1962–1963)
- Jason Smith, 2B (2009)
- Joe Smith, RP (2018–2019, 2021)
- Will Smith, RP (2022)
- Cy Sneed, RP (2019–2020)
- Chris Snyder, C (2012)
- Julio Solano, RP (1983–1987)
- Peter Solomon, RP (2021)
- Henry Sosa, SP (2011)
- José Sosa, RP (1975–1976)
- Bennett Sousa, RP (2023, 2025–present)
- Al Spangler, LF (1962–1965)
- Alex Speas, RP (2024)
- Lucas Spence, CF (2026–present)
- Rob Sperring, 2B (1977)
- Bill Spiers, 3B (1996–2001)
- Harry Spilman, 1B (1981–1985, 1988–1989)
- Scipio Spinks, RP (1969–1971)
- George Springer, CF (2014–2020)
- Russ Springer, RP (1997, 2004–2006)
- Bobby Sprowl, RP (1979–1981)
- Ryne Stanek, RP (2021–2023)
- Andy Stankiewicz, SS (1994–1995)
- Mike Stanton, RP (1975)
- Max Stassi, C (2013–2019)
- Rusty Staub, RF (1963–1968)
- Jimmy Stewart, LF (1972–1973)
- Bob Stinson, C (1972)
- Dean Stone, RP (1962)
- Ricky Stone, RP (2001–2004)
- Mickey Storey, RP (2012)
- Dan Straily, SP (2015)
- Myles Straw, CF (2018–2021)
- Scott Strickland, RP (2005)
- Franklin Stubbs, 1B (1990)
- Garrett Stubbs, C (2019–2021)
- Wander Suero, RP (2024)
- Cory Sullivan, LF (2010)
- Gary Sutherland, 2B (1972–1973)
- **Don Sutton**, SP (1981–1982)
- Greg Swindell, SP (1993–1996)

== T ==
- Jeff Tabaka, RP (1995–1996)
- Eddie Taubensee, C (1992–1994)
- Don Taussig, LF (1962)
- Alex Taveras, 2B (1976)
- Willy Taveras, CF (2004–2006)
- Blake Taylor, RP (2020–2022)
- Ron Taylor, RP (1965–1966)
- Miguel Tejada, SS (2008–2009)
- Johnny Temple, 2B (1962–1963)
- Kai-Wei Teng, RP (2026–present)
- Joe Thatcher, RP (2015)
- Derrel Thomas, 2B (1971)
- Frank Thomas, 1B (1965)
- Lee Thomas, RF (1968)
- Roy Thomas, RP (1977)
- Milt Thompson, RF (1994–1995)
- Ryan Thompson, CF (1999)
- Dickie Thon, SS (1981–1987)
- Otis Thornton, C (1973)
- George Throop, RP (1979)
- Bobby Tiefenauer, RP (1962)
- José Tolentino, 1B (1991)
- Ashur Tolliver, RP (2017)
- Tim Tolman, LF (1981–1985)
- Abraham Toro, 3B (2019–2021)
- Héctor Torres, SS (1968–1970, 1973)
- J. R. Towles, C (2007–2011)
- Taylor Trammell, CF (2025–present)
- Chris Tremie, C (2004)
- Alex Treviño, C (1988–1990)
- Nick Tropeano, SP (2014)
- Gus Triandos, C (1965)
- Chris Truby, 3B (2000–2001)
- Eddie Tucker, C (1992–1993, 1995)
- Kyle Tucker, RF (2018–2024)
- Preston Tucker, LF (2015–2016)

== U ==
- Miguel Ullola, RP (2026–present)
- Jim Umbricht, RP (1962–1963)
- Cecil Upshaw, RP (1973)
- Ramón Urías, 3B (2025)
- José Uribe, SS (1993)
- José Urquidy, SP (2019–2023)

== V ==
- Luis Valbuena, 3B (2015–2016)
- Marc Valdes, RP (2000)
- Raúl Valdés, RP (2014)
- Sandy Valdespino, LF (1969)
- Framber Valdez, SP (2018–2025)
- José Valdez, RP (2011–2012)
- José Valverde, RP (2008–2009)
- Logan VanWey, RP (2025–present)
- Daulton Varsho, CF (2026–present)
- Glenn Vaughan, SS (1963)
- Christian Vázquez, C (2022, 2026–present)
- Vince Velasquez, SP (2015)
- Nelson Velázquez, LF (2026)
- José Veras, RP (2013–2014)
- Dave Veres, RP (1994–1995)
- Justin Verlander, SP (2017–2020, 2022–2024)
- Henry Villar, RP (2010)
- Jonathan Villar, SS (2013–2015)
- Óscar Villarreal, RP (2008)
- Ron Villone, SP (2001, 2003)
- José Vizcaíno, SS (2001–2005)
- Bruce Von Hoff, SP (1965, 1967)

== W ==
- LaMonte Wade, LF (2026–present)
- **Billy Wagner**, RP (1995–2003)
- Christian Walker, 1B (2025–present)
- Tony Walker, CF (1986)
- Donne Wall, SP (1995–1997)
- Brett Wallace, 1B (2010–2013)
- Tye Waller, CF (1987)
- Denny Walling, 3B (1977–1988, 1992)
- Brandon Walter, SP (2025–present)
- Danny Walton, 1B (1968, 1977)
- Daryle Ward, LF (1998–2002)
- Dan Warthen, RP (1978)
- Carl Warwick, RF (1962–1963)
- Ron Washington, 3B (1989)
- Bob Watkins, RP (1969)
- Bob Watson, LF/1B (1966–1979)
- David Weathers, RP (2004)
- Johnny Weekly, LF (1962–1964)
- Jordan Weems, RP (2025)
- Kyle Weiland, SP (2012)
- Ryan Weiss, RP (2026)
- Hayden Wesneski, SP (2025–present)
- Barry Wesson, CF (2002)
- Dan Wheeler, RP (2004–2007)
- Shay Whitcomb, 3B (2024–2026)
- Mike White, CF (1963–1965)
- Rick White, RP (2003, 2007)
- Tyler White, 1B (2016–2019)
- Forrest Whitley, RP (2024–2025)
- Tom Wiedenbauer, RF (1979)
- Tom Wieghaus, C (1984)
- Ty Wigginton, 3B (2007–2008)
- Dean Wilkins, RP (1991)
- Rick Wilkins, C (1995–1996)
- Brian Williams, SP (1991–1994, 1999)
- George Williams, 2B (1962)
- Jerome Williams, RP (2014)
- Mike Williams, RP (2001)
- Mitch Williams, RP (1994)
- Rick Williams, RP (1978–1979)
- Walt Williams, LF (1964)
- Woody Williams, SP (2007)
- Ron Willis, RP (1969)
- Don Wilson, SP (1966–1974)
- Gary Wilson, RP (1979)
- Glenn Wilson, RF (1989–1990)
- Jacob Wilson, 3B (2021)
- Preston Wilson, LF (2006)
- Robbie Wine, C (1986–1987)
- George Witt, RP (1962)
- Asher Wojciechowski, SP (2015)
- Randy Wolf, SP (2008)
- Dooley Womack, RP (1969)
- Hal Woodeshick, RP (1962–1965)
- Gary Woods, RF (1980–1981)
- Danny Worth, 3B (2016)
- Wesley Wright, RP (2008–2013)
- Jimmy Wynn, CF (1963–1973)

== Y ==
- Eric Yelding, SS/CF (1989–1992)
- Larry Yellen, RP (1963–1964)
- Jim York, RP (1973–1975)
- Anthony Young, RP (1996)
- Gerald Young, CF (1987–1992)
- Larry Yount, RP (1971)

== Z ==
- Chris Zachary, SP (1963–1967)
- Oscar Zamora, RP (1978)
- Gregg Zaun, C (2002–2003)
- Josh Zeid, RP (2013–2014)
- Alan Zinter, 1B (2002)
- Eddie Zosky, PH (2000)
