= 1963 Houston Colt .45s season =

Second season in Major League Baseball for the Houston Colt .45s

1963 Houston Colt .45s
- League: National League
- Ballpark: Colt Stadium
- City: Houston, Texas
- Record: 66–96 (.407)
- League place: 9th
- Owners: Roy Hofheinz
- General managers: Paul Richards
- Managers: Harry Craft
- Television: KHOU (TV) (Gene Elston, Guy Savage, Loel Passe)
- Radio: KPRC (AM) (Gene Elston, Loel Passe, Mickey Herskowitz)

The 1963 Houston Colt .45s season was the second season for the Major League Baseball (MLB) franchise located in Houston, Texas, a member of the National League (NL) based at Colt Stadium, The Colt .45s entered the season having finished their inaugural season with a 64–96–2 record, qualifying for eighth place and 36 1/2 games behind the NL pennant-winning San Francisco Giants.

On April 9, pitcher Turk Farrell made his only Opening Day start for the Colt .45s, who hosted the San Francisco Giants but were defeated, 9–2. Colt .45s starting pitchers established a franchise record by registering five contests with a game score of 90 or higher. One such outing was by Don Nottebart, who pitched the first no-hitter in franchise history on May 17, by which Houston defeated the Philadelphia Phillies by a score of 4–1. This no-hitter was also just the second in major league history to have been thrown by an individual pitcher which did not result in a shutout.

Pitcher Hal Woodeshick was selected to represent the Colt .45s at the MLB All-Star Game, his lone career selection.

The Colt .45s finished with a record of 66–96, in ninth place and 33 games behind the NL pennant and World Series-winning Los Angeles Dodgers.

First baseman Rusty Staub was selected to the Topps All-Star Rookie Team, the first Colt 45s rookie so named.

== Offseason ==
The expansion Colt .45s concluded their inaugural season with a 64–96–2 (.401) record, ranking in eighth place in the National League (NL), 36 1/2 games behind the NL pennant-winning San Francisco Giants. The team drew 924,456 patrons, ranking seventh in the National League. Right-hander Turk Farrell became the first All-Star in franchise history, while left-hander Bobby Shantz earned the first Gold Glove Award.

- November 1, 1962: Joe Morgan was signed as an amateur free agent by the Colt .45s.
- November 26, 1962: Conrad Cardinal was drafted by the Colt .45s from the Detroit Tigres in the 1962 first-year draft.
- November 26, 1962: Ellis Burton was drafted by the Colt .45s from the Milwaukee Braves in the 1962 rule 5 draft.
- November 26, 1962: Don Taussig was drafted from the Colt .45s by the Milwaukee Braves in the 1962 minor league draft.
- November 30, 1962: Joey Amalfitano was traded by the Colt .45s to the San Francisco Giants for Manny Mota and Dick LeMay.
- November 30, 1962: Norm Larker was traded by the Colt .45s to the Milwaukee Braves for Jim Bolger, Don Nottebart, and Connie Grob.
- March 28, 1963: Hal Haydel, Dick LeMay and Merritt Ranew were traded by the Colt .45s to the Chicago Cubs for Dave Gerard and Danny Murphy.

== Regular season ==
=== Summary ===
Broadcaster Harry Kalas made his major league debut in 1963 with Houston, replacing Al Helferrceived and working alongside Gene Elston and Loel Passe.

==== April ====
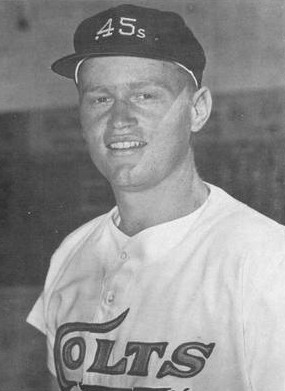
Rusty Staub made his major league debut on Opening Day in 1963.

Opening Day starting lineup
Uniform	Player	Position
11	Ernie Fazio	Second baseman
21	Al Spangler	Left fielder
3	Pete Runnels	First baseman
20	Rusty Staub (Note: Major league debut.)	Right fielder
14	Bob Aspromonte	Third baseman
27	Howie Goss	Center fielder
9	Jim Campbell	Catcher
15	Bob Lillis	Shortstop
13	Turk Farrell	Starting pitcher
Venue: Colt Stadium • San Francisco 9, Houston 2 Sources:

The Colt .45s hosted the San Francisco Giants on Opening Day, as right-hander Turk Farrell, Houston's most accomplished pitcher during their inaugural season, made the start. However, the Giants' bats were well-tuned, as Orlando Cepeda and Willie Mays both took Farrell deep, and piled on four runs in the second. The Giants proceeded to swat 17 hits as Farrell surrendered five runs over three innings. Later, Willie McCovey and Felipe Alou each "touched 'em all" off George Brunet. Al Spangler led the Colts hitters with three hits. Rusty Staub, making his major league debut in right field for the Colts, turned in a memorable performance. During the bottom of the sixth, Staub netted both his first hit and run batted in (RBI) when he diced a single to right field off Giants starter Jack Sanford to bring home Spangler. Later, during the top of the ninth, Staub threw out Jim Davenport attempting to take second after hitting a single. However, the Giants emerged triumphant, 9–2, handing Farrell the loss. Spangler and Bob Aspromonte remained the only holdovers from Houston's first Opening Day starting lineup.

On April 12, Farrell pitched a 12-inning complete game, his only outing going the distance in extra innings. Farrell surrendered four and two base on balls while whiffing 11.

==== Bob Bruce's one-hitter ====
On April 26, right-hander Bob Bruce one-hit the Cincinnati Reds. Bob Lillis and Al Spangler delivered one run batted in (RBI) each to pace Houston's offense for a 2–0 victory. Both starters lasted to earn the complete game, with Bruce (1–1) edging Jim Maloney (2–1) for a game score of 90.

In the bottom of the first, Spangler singled in Pete Runnels for the first tally of the contest. In the bottom of the seventh, Lillis singled in Rusty Staub for the Colts' second run. Bruce issued a base on balls to the Reds' Marty Keough leading off the ninth. With two out, Don Blasingame coaxed another walk to place runners on first and second for the Reds' biggest scoring threat of the contest. However, Bruce got Vada Pinson to ground into an unassisted out to first for the final out of the contest and seal the Colts' victory.

This was the first shutout in club history that resulted in one hit or fewer, (Note: For single games, playing for HOU, in the regular season, requiring hits allowed ≤ 1 and innings pitched ≥ 8, sorted by ascending date.) the fourth with a game score of 90 or above, and first complete game in franchise history pitched in nine innings or fewer that resulted in a game score of 90 or above. (Note: For single games, playing for HOU, in the regular season, requiring game score ≥ 90, sorted by ascending date.)

==== May ====
On May 10, Turk Farrell struck out a then-club record 13 hitters, supplanting his own (July 20) and Ken Johnson's (August 14) 12-whiff outings from the previous year. (Note: For single games, from 1962 to 1966, playing for HOU, in the regular season, sorted by descending strikeouts.) Both Farrell and Chicago Cubs starter, Glen Hobbie, went the distance as the Colts prevailed, 4–1. Farrell spun a two-hit, no walk performance for a game score of 92. At the plate, Farrell singled in Howie Goss for the go-ahead run. Rusty Staub collected three hits and two RBI. Moreover, this was Farrell's first two-hit complete game, representing a career-best. Farrell was later tied by Bob Bruce on May 26, 1965, and surpassed by Mike Cuellar on June 25, 1966.

On May 12, Bob Aspromonte hit his first career walk-off home run, during the bottom of the tenth inning off Bob Buhl to decide a 2–1 victory for Houston over the Chicago Cubs. This was the first of two walk-off home runs Aspromnonte hit against Chicago this season, with the latter on June 11.

==== Don Nottebart's no-hitter ====
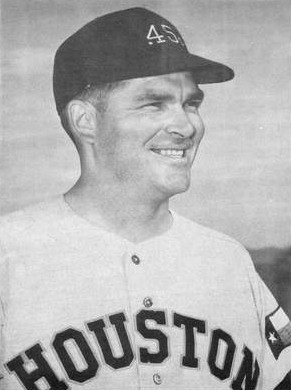
Don Nottebart pitched the first no-hitter for the Houston Colt .45s.

On May 17, Don Nottebart pitched the first no-hitter for an expansion team when Houston defeated Philadelphia by a score of 4–1. In his masterpiece, Nottebart surrendered three walks and struck out eight.

Twenty-year old catcher John Bateman was Nottebart's batterymate. The historic contrest transpired at Colt Stadium before 8,223 fans.

Right fielder Carl Warwick, with a 4-for-4 day at the plate, finished just a double away from hitting for the cycle. During the bottom of the first, Warwick took Jack Hamilton deep for his second home run of the season. In the bottom of the fourth, Warwick scorched a ground ball single to right field off Hamilton. Warwick singled again in the sixth prior to being erased on a Pete Runnels groundball force out. His final hit of the day was a triple to center field against Ryne Duren.

The lead set by Warwick's home run maintained at 1–0 until the top of the fifth inning, when Don Demeter smoked a ground ball through the legs of J. C. Hartman, who was charged with an error. Demeter jetted to second, whom Clay Dalrymple sacrificed to third. Don Hoak then looped a short fly to Howie Goss just behind second base. Demeter then raced home, as Goss' throw to Bateman was off-target, allowing Demeter to score Philadelphia's only run easily and eliminate the shutout bid.

In the bottom of the sixth, Goss atoned for the uncompetitive throw with a three-run drive deep to left that put the Colts in the lead for good, 4–1.

Nottebart maintained the no-hitter and got the complete game with the only blemish being the unearned run in the fifth. In addition, the effort earned a game score of 90. Remarkably, this was the second no-hitter in the major leagues since 1950 to have been thrown by an individual pitcher which was also not a shutout, following Bob Feller's gem on July 1, 1951, when he led the Cleveland Indians to a 2–1 triumph over the Detroit Tigers.

Nottebart's outing was the fifth (and final) on the season that featured a game score of 90 or higher by a Colts starting pitcher, which set a franchise record—in just the 37th contest of the season. (Note: Number of player games that meet criteria in a season, playing for HOU, in the regular season, requiring game score ≥ 90, sorted by descending date.)

Houston's subsequent no-hitter was fabricated by Nottebart's rotation-mate, Ken Johnson, less than one year later on April, 23, 1964. Also remarkable was that Johnson's no-hitter paralleled Nottebart's in that it was also achieved without a shutout effort.

==== Rest of May ====
On May 22 and 24, Al Spangler became the first player in team history to record four hits each over consecutive games. (Note: Next accomplished for Houston by John Bateman on September 6, 1966. Criteria: Longest streak of consecutive games, playing for HOU, in the regular season, requiring Hits ≥ 4, sorted by most games matching criteria.)

==== June ====
In the 17th inning on June 2, Astros catcher Jim Campbell delivered the game-winning single for a 3–1 score versus the Milwaukee Braves.

On June 3, Colts pitcher Turk Farrell took a no-hitter into the seventh inning versus the Los Angeles Dodgers, while Rusty Staub slugged his first career home run against Don Drysdale. As "revenge" for being exposed in the expansion draft, Farrell tossed a two-hit, 2–1 masterpiece to garner the complete game victory and outduel Drysdale, who fanned 13. Staub's blast, which also scored Carl Warwick, accounted for Houston's only tallies.

The first Sunday night game in National League history took place on June 9 at Colt Stadium. The Colt .45s hosted the San Francisco Giants and won, 3–0, to sweep the series. The night games were played as a result of the suffocating heat during day games in the 1962 season.

A little leaguer, recovering in Houston from a lightning strike, received a promise on June 11 from Colt .45s infielder Bob Aspromonte that he would hit a home run. Not only did Aspromonte deliver the home run later that day against the Cubs, but he did so by hitting the first walk-off grand slam in franchise history, (Note: Aspromonte later hit the next walk-off grand slam for Houston on August 26, 1966, also against Chicago.) as well as his first career grand slam, and the first of three he would swat against the Cubs. (Note: Aspromnonte totaled three walk-off home runs during his career—all against the Cubs.) The Colts' first runs of the contest crossed the plate in the sixth inning, when Rusty Staub and Howie Goss hit consecutive run-scoring singles, plating Davis and Aspromonte, respectively. In the top of the ninth inning, Dick Bertell led off with a triple off Colts starter Ken Johnson. Johnson next issued a walk to Aspromnote's older brother, Ken, who was Johnson's final batter faced. Hal Woodeshick relieved and surrendered a game-tying single to Don Landrum, resulting in a blown save (4). With the scored tied 2-all in the bottom of the tenth inning, Aspromonte hit the grand slam from a Lindy McDaniel offering, scoring Bob Lillis, Ernie Fazio, and Brock Davis. Woodeshick recovered to toss two shutout innings and earn the victory (6–2). Moreover, Aspromonte replicated the grand slam event exactly one year later in 1964 a seminal moment during the fifth inning which provided the margin for a 5–3 triumph over the Cincinnati Reds.

==== July ====
On July 4, Jim Campbell hit the only grand slam of his career, off Reds starter Joey Jay during the bottom of the eighth inning to snap a 2–2 tie. The score remained 6–2 for a victory the Colts, the second game of a doubleheader. Turk Farrell (6–6) hurled 3 1/3 shutout innings in relief to obtain the decision. Campbell's grand slam sealed a sweep of the doubleheader.

Twenty-one year old Jimmy Wynn made his MLB debut on July 10, as the starting shortstop, and was 1-for-4 with a stolen base versus the Pittsburgh Pirates. Wynn attained his first hit off Pirates starter Bob Friend (who tossed a complete game) leading off the top of the ninth inning, and pilfered second for his first major league steal with Bob Lillis batting.

Wynn slugged his first major league home run on July 14, New York Mets, in the top of the fifth at Shea Stadium, from a Don Rowe offering.

On July 15, Ken Johnson surrendered the first and only grand slam by a Houston Colt .45s/Astros hurler to his counterpart, Carl Willey of the New York Mets. The Mets drubbed the Astros, 15–4. Jimmy Wynn stroked his first career double. However, two weeks later on July 26, Aspromonte himself revisited the favor upon the Mets.

On July 26, Bob Aspromonte hit a second grand slam, which invoked extra import for another young fan, the visually impaired Bill Bradley. Bradley, whose sight was restored after three operations over two years, watched the promised blast from his hero, who pointed to him while rounding the bases. Aspromonte's drive accentuated a seven-run opening frame, more than enough support for ace Turk Farrell to earn the victory, a 7–3 decision over New York. Meanwhile, at the plate, Farrell excelled with his first career three-hit bout.

==== September ====
On September 21, just two days after his 20th birthday, Joe Morgan made his major league debut, going hitless in one at bat versus the Philadelphia Phillies. The following day, Morgan achieved his first major league hit, a single in the ninth inning that scored Jimmy Wynn for the walk-off hit and 2–1 triumph over Philadelphia.

In the antepenultimate contest of the season, on September 27, manager Harry Craft devised a strategy to help reverse waning attendance by deploying an all-rookie starting lineup. Per known sources, an all-rookie lineup was unprecedented in major league history. Having entered the series with a four-game winning streak, were they to sweep their expansion brethren, the New York Mets, for the final three-game set, a seven-game winning streak would surpass the longest of the year at six consecutive. Four players would make their big league debuts, including two starters: at shortstop and batting leadoff, Sonny Jackson, and on the mound, Jay Dahl. Two others, Danny Coombs and Joe Hoerner, pitched in relief. However, things did go proceed as Craft envisioned as the Mets routed the Colts, 10–3. The Mets rocked Dahl (0–1) for seven runs in under three innings of work. Coombs relieved Dahl on the mound, recorded one out, and surrendered another run on three hits. Hoerner took over for Coombs and tossed three scoreless frames. Jackson went hitless at the plate. Joe Morgan hit his first major league triple, and he, Rusty Staub, and Brock Davis each plated a run. Meanwhile, Mets starter Al Jackson (13–17) leveraged his offense's early outburst, limiting the Colts to three runs as he went the distance, scattering 11 hits. Craft utilized 16 rookies during this game.

During the regular-season finale on September 29, outfielder John Paciorek made his major league debut, while pitcher Jim Umbricht got two outs to assume the victory. Paciorek went 3-for-3, drew two walks, collected 3 RBI, and scored four times as the Colts topped the Mets, 13–4. John Bateman also collected three RBI, Bob Aspromonte scored thrice, Joe Morgan coaxed a game-high three walks, and Asprononte and Bateman both tripled. However, due to physical ailments for both Paciorek and Umbricht, this represented their final major league appearance. Paciorek was battling significant back injuries that robbed him of great promise. Umbricht, having returned to the mound against great odds following treatment for melanoma, died just days prior to Opening Day the following April. Houston totaled 13 hits and 11 walks, resulting in the first bout in franchise history in which the Colts collected 10 or more of each of the aforementioned categories played in 9 innings or fewer. (Note: The next occurrence game of this type for the Colt .45s/Astros occurred on April 30, 1972. Criteria: For single games, from 1962 to 2026, only 9-inning games or shortened, for HOU, in the regular season, requiring bases on balls ≥ 10 and hits ≥ 10, sorted by ascending date.)

==== Performance overview ====
Highlighted by Don Nottebart's no-hitter—the first in franchise history—this Colt .45s pitching staff set a club all-time record by tossing five games with a game score of 90 or higher. The five game scores of 90 were, at the time, the most ever since the start of the live-ball era in 1921. The all-time lead of seven—counting dead-ball era play—was accomplished by the 1904 Philadelphia Athletics and 1910 Chicago White Sox. Four other pre-1921 clubs had tied for second by tallying five such games. In 1968, the Cleveland Indians and St. Louis Cardinals each set the post-1921 record with 7 such contests. (Note: Pre-1921 clubs with five games with scores of 90 or higher: 1904 Boston Americans, 1914 White Sox, 1918 Pittsburgh Pirates, and 1918 Washington Senators. Criteria: Number of player games that meet criteria for a team, in the regular season, requiring game score ≥ 90, sorted by descending date.)

Hal Woodeshick, who worked to a 1.97 earned run average (ERA), established a club record with minimum 100 innings pitched (IP) that stood until 1980. That season, J. R. Richard yielded a 1.90 ERA and Dave Smith 1.93. (Note: For single seasons, up to 1980, at least 100 innings pitched, playing for HOU, in the regular season, requiring earned run average ≤ 3, sorted by ascending Earned Run Average.)

Bob Aspromonte was one of seven hitters in the major leagues that season tied for most walk-off home runs with two. (Note: Also, Al Kaline, Frank Howard, Willie Mays, Jim Hickman, Tim Harkness, and Don Lock.)

Rusty Staub, aged 19, became just the second major league rookie since 1900 to appear in 150 games as a teenager, joining Bob Kennedy, also 19, a member of the Chicago White Sox in 1940.

=== Season standings ===
National League
Team	W	L	Pct.	GB	Home	Road
Los Angeles Dodgers	99	63	.611	—	50‍–‍31	49‍–‍32
St. Louis Cardinals	93	69	.574	6	53‍–‍28	40‍–‍41
San Francisco Giants	88	74	.543	11	50‍–‍31	38‍–‍43
Philadelphia Phillies	87	75	.537	12	45‍–‍36	42‍–‍39
Cincinnati Reds	86	76	.531	13	46‍–‍35	40‍–‍41
Milwaukee Braves	84	78	.519	15	45‍–‍36	39‍–‍42
Chicago Cubs	82	80	.506	17	43‍–‍38	39‍–‍42
Pittsburgh Pirates	74	88	.457	25	42‍–‍39	32‍–‍49
Houston Colt .45s	66	96	.407	33	44‍–‍37	22‍–‍59
New York Mets	51	111	.315	48	34‍–‍47	17‍–‍64

=== Record versus opponents ===
National League

1963 National League record Sources:
Team	CHC	CIN	HOU	LAD	MIL	NYM	PHI	PIT	SF	STL
Chicago	—	9–9	9–9	7–11	12–6	11–7	9–9	8–10	10–8	7–11
Cincinnati	9–9	—	11–7	8–10	10–8	10–8	8–10	11–7	8–10	11–7
Houston	9–9	7–11	—	5–13	5–13	13–5	8–10	6–12	8–10	5–13
Los Angeles	11–7	10–8	13–5	—	8–10–1	16–2	7–11	13–5	9–9	12–6
Milwaukee	6–12	8–10	13–5	10–8–1	—	12–6	10–8	7–11	10–8	8–10
New York	7–11	8–10	5–13	2–16	6–12	—	8–10	4–14	6–12	5–13
Philadelphia	9–9	10–8	10–8	11–7	8–10	10–8	—	13–5	8–10	8–10
Pittsburgh	10–8	7–11	12–6	5–13	11–7	14–4	5–13	—	5–13	5–13
San Francisco	8–10	10–8	10–8	9–9	8–10	12–6	10–8	13–5	—	8–10
St. Louis	11–7	7–11	13–5	6–12	10–8	13–5	10–8	13–5	10–8	—

=== Notable transactions ===
- April 2, 1963: Ellis Burton was purchased from the Colt .45s by the Cleveland Indians.
- April 4, 1963: Manny Mota was traded by the Colt .45s to the Pittsburgh Pirates for Howie Goss and cash.

=== Roster ===
1963 Houston Colt .45s
Roster
Pitchers: 38 Hal Brown; 30 Bob Bruce; 33 George Brunet; 34 Conrad Cardinal; 41 Danny Coombs; 42 Jay Dahl; 34 Jim Dickson; 36 Dick Drott; 13 Turk Farrell; 35 Jim Golden; 48 Joe Hoerner; 40 Ken Johnson; 39 Russ Kemmerer; 31 Don McMahon; 43 Don Nottebart; 32 Jim Umbricht; 46 Hal Woodeshick; 47 Larry Yellen; 44 Chris Zachary	Catchers: 8,24 Dave Adlesh; 7 John Bateman; 9 Jim Campbell; 6 Jerry Grote; 8,9 Hal Smith; Infielders: 14 Bob Aspromonte; 11 Ernie Fazio; 18 J. C. Hartman; 19 Sonny Jackson; 15 Bob Lillis; 12 Joe Morgan; 3 Pete Runnels; 10 Rusty Staub; 16 Johnny Temple; 4 Glenn Vaughan; 16 Mike White	Outfielders: 29 Brock Davis; 27 Howie Goss; 26 Carroll Hardy; 23 Ivan Murrell; 22 John Paciorek; 17 Aaron Pointer; 21 Al Spangler; 20 Carl Warwick; 26 Johnny Weekly; 18 Jimmy Wynn	Manager: 1 Harry Craft; Coaches: 2 Jimmy Adair; 4 Jim Busby (Third Base); 5 Cot Deal (Pitching); 6 Lum Harris

== Player stats ==
=== Batting ===
==== Starters by position ====
Note: Pos = Position; G = Games played; AB = At bats; R = Runs scored; H = Hits; 2B = Doubles; 3B = Triples; Avg. = Batting average; HR = Home runs; RBI = Runs batted in; SB = Stolen bases
Positional abbreviations: C = Catcher; 1B = First base; 2B = Second base; 3B = Third base; SS = Shortstop; LF = Left field; CF = Center field; RF = Right field

Pos	Player	G	AB	R	H	2B	3B	Avg.	HR	RBI	SB
C	John Bateman	128	404	23	85	8	6	.210	10	59	0
1B	Rusty Staub	150	513	43	115	17	4	.224	6	45	0
2B	Ernie Fazio	102	228	31	42	10	3	.184	2	5	4
3B	Bob Aspromonte	136	468	42	100	9	5	.214	8	49	3
SS	Bob Lillis	147	469	31	93	13	1	.198	1	19	3
LF	Al Spangler	120	430	52	121	25	4	.281	4	27	5
CF	Howie Goss	133	411	37	86	18	2	.209	9	44	4
RF	Carl Warwick	150	528	49	134	19	5	.209	7	47	3

==== Other batters ====
Note: G = Games played; AB = At bats; R = Runs scored; H = Hits; 2B = Doubles; 3B = Triples; Avg. = Batting average; HR = Home runs; RBI = Runs batted in; SB = Stolen bases

Player	G	AB	R	H	2B	3B	Avg.	HR	RBI	SB
Pete Runnels	124	388	35	98	9	1	.253	2	23	2
Johnny Temple	100	322	22	85	12	1	.264	1	17	7
Jim Wynn	70	250	31	61	10	5	.244	4	27	4
Jim Campbell	55	158	9	35	3	0	.222	4	19	0
J. C. Hartman	39	90	2	11	1	0	.122	0	3	1
Johnny Weekly	34	80	4	18	3	0	.225	3	14	0
Hal Smith	31	58	1	14	2	0	.241	0	2	0
Brock Davis	34	55	7	11	2	0	.200	1	2	0
Carroll Hardy	15	44	5	10	3	0	.227	0	3	1
Glenn Vaughan	9	30	1	5	0	0	.167	0	0	1
Joe Morgan	8	25	5	6	0	1	.240	0	3	1
Dave Adlesh	6	8	0	0	0	0	.000	0	0	0
Mike White	3	7	0	2	0	0	.286	0	0	0
Jerry Grote	3	5	0	1	0	0	.200	0	1	0
Ivan Murrell	2	5	1	1	0	0	.200	0	0	0
Aaron Pointer	2	5	0	1	0	0	.200	0	0	0
John Paciorek	1	3	4	3	0	0	1.000	0	3	0
Sonny Jackson	1	3	0	0	0	0	.000	0	0	0

=== Pitching ===
==== Starting pitchers ====
Note: G = Games pitched; GS = Games started; IP = Innings pitched; W = Wins; L = Losses; ERA = Earned run average; R = Runs allowed; ER = Earned runs allowed; BB = Walks allowed; K = Strikeouts

Player	G	GS	IP	W	L	ERA	R	ER	BB	K
Ken Johnson	37	32	224.0	11	17	2.65	86	66	50	148
Turk Farrell	34	26	202.1	14	13	3.02	76	68	35	141
Don Nottebart	31	27	193.0	11	8	3.17	80	68	39	118
Bob Bruce	30	25	170.1	5	9	3.59	73	68	60	123
Hal Brown	26	20	141.1	5	11	3.31	54	52	60	68
Larry Yellen	1	1	5.0	0	0	3.60	4	2	1	3
Jay Dahl	1	1	2.2	0	1	16.88	7	5	0	0

==== Other pitchers ====
Note: G = Games pitched; GS = Games started; IP = Innings pitched; W = Wins; L = Losses; SV = Saves; ERA = Earned run average; R = Runs allowed; ER = Earned runs allowed; BB = Walks allowed; K = Strikeouts

Player	G	GS	IP	W	L	SV	ERA	R	ER	BB	K
Dick Drott	27	14	97.2	2	12	0	4.98	61	54	49	58
Chris Zachary	22	7	57.0	2	2	0	4.89	38	31	22	42
Conrad Cardinal	6	1	13.1	0	1	0	6.08	14	9	7	7
George Brunet	5	2	12.2	0	3	0	7.11	11	10	6	11
Jim Golden	3	1	6.1	0	1	0	5.68	4	4	2	5

==== Relief pitchers ====
Note: G = Games pitched; IP = Innings pitched; W = Wins; L = Losses; SV = Saves; ERA = Earned run average; R = Runs allowed; ER = Earned runs allowed; BB = Walks allowed; K = Strikeouts

Player	G	IP	W	L	SV	ERA	R	ER	BB	K
Hal Woodeshick	55	114.0	11	9	10	1.97	29	25	42	94
Don McMahon	49	80.0	1	5	5	4.05	38	36	26	51
Jim Umbricht	35	76.0	4	3	0	2.61	23	22	21	48
Russ Kemmerer	17	36.2	0	0	1	5.65	28	23	8	12
Jim Dickson	13	14.2	0	1	2	6.14	13	10	2	6
Joe Hoerner	1	3.0	0	0	0	0.00	0	0	0	2
Danny Coombs	1	0.1	0	0	0	27.00	1	1	0	0

== Awards and honors ==
=== Grand slams ===
No.	Date	Astros batter	Venue	Inning	Pitcher	Opposing team	Box
1	June 11	Bob Aspromonte (Note: 1st MLB grand slam)	Colt Stadium	9 (Note: Walk-off)	Lindy McDaniel	Chicago Cubs	
2	July 4 (Note: Game 2 of doubleheader)	Jim Campbell	Colt Stadium	8 (Note: Tied score or took lead)	Joey Jay	Cincinnati Reds	
3	July 26	Bob Aspromonte	Colt Stadium	1	Tracy Stallard	New York Mets	

=== No-hit game ===
Date	Pitcher	IP	BB	BR	K	BF	Catcher	Final	Opponent	Venue	Plate umpire	Box
May 17, 1963	Don Nottebart	9	3	4	9	31	John Bateman	4–1	Philadelphia Phillies	Colt Stadium	Ed Vargo	
May 17, 1963	Nottebart: Game score: 90 • Win (5–1)											

=== Awards ===
1963 Houston Colt .45s award winners
Name of award		Recipient	Ref.
Houston Colt .45s Most Valuable Player (MVP)		Hal Woodeshick	
MLB All-Star	Reserve pitcher	Hal Woodeshick	
Topps All-Star Rookie Team	First baseman	Rusty Staub	

=== Milestones ===
==== Major League debuts ====
Player—Appeared at position

- Rusty Staub, right fielder
- Jimmy Wynn, shortstop
- Joe Morgan, pinch hitter
- Sonny Jackson, shortstop
- Jay Dahl, starting pitcher
- Joe Hoerner, relief pitcher
- Danny Coombs, relief pitcher
- John Paciorek, right fielder

Date and opponent

- April 9 vs San Francisco (Note: Opening Day)
- July 10 at Pittsburgh
- September 21 vs Philadelphia
- September 27 vs New York
- September 27 vs New York
- September 27 vs New York
- September 27 vs New York
- September 29 vs New York
Also:
Box

== Minor league system ==
Level	Team	League	Manager
AAA	Oklahoma City 89ers	Pacific Coast League	Grady Hatton
AA	San Antonio Bullets	Texas League	Lou Fitzgerald
A	Modesto Colts	California League	Dave Philley
A	Durham Bulls	Carolina League	Billy Goodman
A	Moultrie Colt .22s	Georgia–Florida League	Jim Walton

Championships

- Pacific Coast League champions: Oklahoma City

== See also ==
- List of Major League Baseball no-hitters
