= Jay Dahl =

American baseball player (1945-1965)

- Pitcher
- Born: December 6, 1945; San Bernardino, California, U.S.
- Died: June 21, 1965 (aged 19); Salisbury, North Carolina, U.S.
- Batted: Switch Threw: Left

MLB debut
- September 27, 1963, for the Houston Colt .45s

Last MLB appearance
- September 27, 1963, for the Houston Colt .45s

MLB statistics
- Win–loss record: 0–1
- Earned run average: 16.88
- Strikeouts: 0
- Stats at Baseball Reference

Teams
- Houston Colt .45s (1963)

Jay Steven Dahl (December 6, 1945 – June 21, 1965) was an American baseball pitcher who made his debut (and lone appearance) in Major League Baseball at age 17 in 1963, then died less than two years later in a car crash.

== Career ==
Signed by the Houston Colt .45s as an undrafted free agent directly out of Colton High School (California) in June 1963, Dahl was sent to the Moultrie, Georgia, Colt .22s of the Georgia–Florida League. Dahl dominated the league, with a 5–1 record and a 1.42 ERA—his only loss was a one-hitter, in his first appearance as a starter. After making one start for the San Antonio Bullets of the Double-A Texas League (pitching four innings and allowing only three hits and an unearned run), he made his big-league debut on September 27, 1963, at Colt Stadium against the New York Mets.

Dahl wasn't the only rookie in the lineup for Houston that night; in fact, the entire Colts starting nine were first-year players (the only time this has ever been attempted by an MLB club -- at least after 1876, the year the first major league began):

Houston Colt .45s starting lineup, September 27, 1963
Players marked with a † were making their major league debut

- Sonny Jackson, SS †
- Joe Morgan, 2B
- Jim Wynn, CF
- Rusty Staub, 1B
- Aaron Pointer, RF
- Brock Davis, LF
- Glenn Vaughan, 3B
- Jerry Grote, C
- Jay Dahl, P †

Dahl got New York out in the first inning, but allowed three runs in the second and four more in the third before being removed by manager Harry Craft. (Danny Coombs and Joe Hoerner, who followed Dahl on the mound for Houston, were also making their MLB debuts.) The Mets went on to win, 10–3. It was to be Dahl's only major league appearance. (As of 2025, Dahl is the most recent MLB player under the age of eighteen.)

In Instructional League that fall, Dahl developed arm problems (the ailment was also described as being his back). He did not pitch at all in 1964, appearing in 11 games as an outfielder for Statesville, North Carolina–based Statesville Colts in the Western Carolinas League. In 1965, Dahl was back on the mound, starting seven games with Carolina League's Durham Bulls, then moving over to the Salisbury, North Carolina–based Salisbury Astros of the WCL, where he had a 5–0 record.

== Death ==
At 11:24 p.m. on Sunday, June 20, 1965, Dahl's teammate Gary Allen Marshall was driving a GTO with two passengers: Dahl and 20-year-old Patricia Ann Troutman. Apparently traveling at a high speed, the car hit a patch of sand on Lincolnton Road in Salisbury, skidded out of control for about 185 feet (56 m) and slammed broadside into a tree. Troutman was killed instantly, and Dahl died of extensive internal injuries about three hours later in Salisbury's Rowan Memorial Hospital. Marshall survived the wreck but was blinded, also suffering a broken right arm and a broken right leg; he was later charged with manslaughter, but the charges were dismissed and he was allowed to return home to Hutchinson, Kansas. (Marshall later moved to Dallas and joined the ministry, tending to the newly blinded; he died in 2008, at the age of 62.)

Earlier that day, Dahl had pitched the Salisbury Astros into first place; in celebration of his 7–3 victory over Gastonia, North Carolina, the players were the guests that evening at a steak dinner at the home of G. M. Hamilton, Salisbury's club president. Dahl and Marshall left after dinner and attended a movie with Troutman; they were returning her to her home when the crash occurred.

As of February 2025, Dahl is the youngest player to die after appearing in the major leagues.

== See also ==
- List of baseball players who died during their careers
