= Jim Umbricht =

American baseball player (1930–1964)

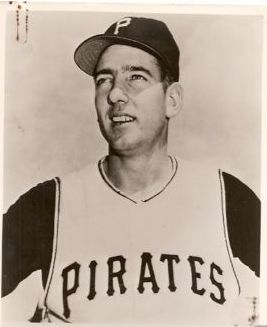
- Pitcher
- Born: September 17, 1930; Chicago, Illinois, U.S.
- Died: April 8, 1964 (aged 33); Houston, Texas, U.S.
- Batted: Right Threw: Right

MLB debut
- September 26, 1959, for the Pittsburgh Pirates

Last MLB appearance
- September 29, 1963, for the Houston Colt .45s

MLB statistics
- Win–loss record: 9–5
- Earned run average: 3.06
- Strikeouts: 133
- Stats at Baseball Reference

Teams
- Pittsburgh Pirates (1959–1961); Houston Colt .45s (1962–1963)

Career highlights and awards
- Houston Astros No. 32 retired; Houston Astros Hall of Fame

James Umbricht (September 17, 1930 – April 8, 1964) was an American professional baseball player. A right-handed relief pitcher, he played Major League Baseball (MLB) between 1959 and 1963 for the Pittsburgh Pirates and Houston Colt .45s.

Umbricht was born in Chicago but grew up in Georgia. He started his professional career in 1953, making the majors in 1959. Over the next seasons, he alternated between teams, playing for the Pirates and that team's farm system. Umbricht was drafted by the Colt .45s in 1962, and became one of the National League's top relief pitchers.

Diagnosed with melanoma in his right leg in March 1963, his comeback to baseball following surgery made national headlines and encouraged research on the disease. He spent the 1963 season as a relief pitcher, sometimes in excruciating pain. Umbricht's health deteriorated soon afterwards and he died within six months, from complications from melanoma in a Houston-area hospital at age 33. His ashes were spread over the construction site of the Astrodome, the future home of the Colt .45s. The team retired Umbricht's jersey number, 32, and wore black armbands for the 1964 season in his honor.

== Early career ==
Umbricht was born in Chicago, and moved with his family to Atlanta in 1946. Aspiring to be a professional baseball player, Umbricht practiced every day on a field by his house and became a multi-sport star at Decatur High School in Decatur, Georgia. He attended the University of Georgia on a scholarship and played on the school's baseball and basketball teams, becoming the captain of both for his senior year. He was named to the All-Southeastern Conference first-team as a shortstop in 1951.

After graduating from Georgia, Umbricht participated in a local tryout camp for the Waycross Bears in the Class D Georgia–Florida League, a low-level minor league affiliate in the Milwaukee Braves organization. He made the team, starting his professional baseball career as a pitcher and infielder. In 1953, Umbricht pitched for the Bears in 10 games, starting in eight of them. Umbricht finished with a 4–3 win–loss record and a 2.87 earned run average.

Umbricht missed the 1954 and 1955 seasons while serving in the United States Army, but pitched for a military team at Fort Carson in Colorado. After his discharge in 1956, Umbricht played for the Baton Rouge Rebels of the Evangeline League; he had a 15–15 Win–loss record in 32 games as the team finished with a 53–70 record, and led the league with 27 complete games. He was promoted to the Topeka Hawks of the Western League in 1957, and had a 13–8 record with a 3.24 earned run average in 28 games pitched. In 1958 he played for the Atlanta Crackers of the Southern Association. He went 6–10 with a 4.06 earned run average in 55 games, mostly as a relief pitcher. Umbricht was traded to the Pittsburgh Pirates organization for Emil Panko prior to the 1959 season. The Pirates assigned Umbricht to their Triple-A affiliate, the Salt Lake City Bees in the Pacific Coast League. While with the Bees, Umbricht had a 14–8 record with a 2.78 earned run average in 47 games, mostly in relief.

== Major League career ==
=== Pittsburgh Pirates ===
On the strength of his performance for the Bees, Umbricht was promoted to the Pirates roster near the end of the 1959 season. He appeared in only one game, a 7–6 loss to the Cincinnati Reds. He pitched seven innings, giving up five earned runs while striking out three. Umbricht left the game in position for the win, as the Pirates were leading 6–5, but reliever Don Gross gave up two earned runs in the ninth inning for the blown save and the loss.

Two spots in the starting rotation were available by the time the Pirates started their 1960 season. At the beginning of spring training, Umbricht competed against fellow rookies Bennie Daniels and Joe Gibbon for a place. The Pirates began strongly in spring training, winning 11 in a row at one point. In a game against the Detroit Tigers, Umbricht combined with Daniels to throw a no-hitter. Manager Danny Murtaugh was impressed with Umbricht's pitching and expected him to become the Pirates' fifth starter (a combination of spot starter and reliever) by opening day. He won the spot and in his first start of the season against the Reds on April 17, he gave up six earned runs in 5.1 innings, getting charged with the 11–3 loss. In his next start against the Philadelphia Phillies on April 21, Umbricht had poor control, giving up three runs and walking five batters in 2.1 innings. He made a last-minute start against Los Angeles Dodgers pitcher Don Drysdale on May 25, after Pirates starting pitcher Bob Friend had a sore throat and could not play. Umbricht pitched five innings, striking out five batters, but gave up two critical second-inning home runs to Frank Howard and John Roseboro and was charged with the loss. After an off-day and a game postponed because of rain, the Pirates faced the Phillies at home on May 28. After the game went to extra innings, Umbricht pitched the 13th inning. The Pirates won in the later half of the inning, earning Umbricht his first career win.

Umbricht continued to struggle in the bullpen and was demoted alongside Daniels on June 27 to the Columbus Jets of the International League as pitchers Tom Cheney and Earl Francis were promoted to the main squad. Between June 27 and September 9, he appeared in 19 games, 15 of them starts, earning an 8–5 record, two shutouts and a 2.50 earned run average. With his strong pitching performance at Columbus, Umbricht was re-promoted to the main roster in early September to help the Pirates in their pennant race. On September 27 against the Reds, he struck out three batters in two innings in relief as the Pirates broke a team record by striking out 19 batters in a 16-inning victory. The Pirates managed to win the National League pennant, but he was not named in the final roster for the World Series, which the Pirates won in seven games. Overall during the 1960 season, Umbricht appeared in 17 games for the Pirates, compiling a 1–2 record with a 5.09 earned run average and 26 strikeouts.

He appeared in one game during the 1961 season, pitching three innings in relief during a May 5 loss against the Dodgers. He was demoted alongside outfielder Román Mejías on May 10 as the Pirates had to trim their roster from 28 players to 25 per league rules. Umbricht was sent back to Columbus, where he spent the rest of the 1961 season as a full-time starter. In 22 games, Umbricht had a 9–6 win–loss record with a 2.35 earned run average in 142 innings pitched.

=== Houston Colt .45s ===
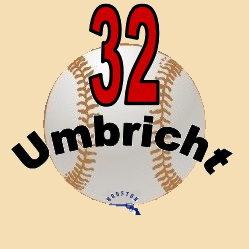
Jim Umbricht's number 32 was retired by the Houston Astros in 1965.

Umbricht was selected by the Houston Colt .45s with the 35th pick in the 1961 Major League Baseball expansion draft. Umbricht had become friends with Houston's general manager Paul Richards when the two were at Waycross in 1953, and Richards selected Umbricht to give him a better chance of pitching in the majors. With the Colts, Umbricht quickly became one of the best relief pitchers in the National League. Umbricht started the season on the Colts roster, but was demoted to the Oklahoma City 89ers of the American Association to make room for veteran pitcher Don McMahon. He appeared in 23 games for the 89ers, posting a 3–4 win–loss record with a 3.39 earned run average, mostly in relief. He rejoined the Colts roster in the middle of the 1962 season as a relief specialist. He appeared in 34 games that season, earning a 4–0 win–loss record with a solid 2.01 earned run average. He struck out 55 batters while walking only 17.

Umbricht threw four pitches, a fastball, curveball, slider and the changeup. He was used primarily as a setup pitcher during his brief tenure with the Colts. According to former teammate and roommate Ken Johnson, Umbricht was used by the Colts mainly to control damage caused by starting pitchers after they were removed from games. In his five-year Major League Baseball career, Umbricht compiled a 9–5 win–loss record, with 133 strikeouts, three saves and a 3.06 earned run average in 88 games.

== Cancer and early death ==
=== Cancer diagnosis and 1963 season ===
At the beginning of spring training for the 1963 season, Umbricht noticed a small black mole in his right leg, near the thigh while on a golf outing with Richards. Umbricht ignored the mole at first, but it grew at a rapid pace. Richards and team trainer Jim Ewell told Umbricht to have it checked by a doctor. A three-inch section of the mole was removed for testing and a doctor confirmed it was a "black mole" tumor that had spread to his groin area. Ewell said Umbricht "had the most wonderful attitude of anyone you'll ever meet". Umbricht's cancer diagnosis shocked baseball and made national headlines. On March 7, Umbricht underwent a six-hour operation using perfusion to remove the tumor from his right leg. The perfusion technique was radical at the time, entering use as a surgical procedure not long before Umbricht's surgery. After a month-long hospital stay, Umbricht and his doctors told the media that he beat the cancer, crediting "early detection and good physical condition", further stating that he "should have five or six good years left" in his baseball career. However, Umbricht learned that the doctors were unsure if the cancer surgery was a success, or even if it had been completely removed from his body. Even if it was, his chance of survival was slim at best. Upon hearing the news, Umbricht decided to keep it a secret outside his immediate family.

Umbricht wanted to return to pitch for the Colt .45s and was in uniform by opening day. Manager Harry Craft added Umbricht to the Colts' active list prior to a May 9 game against Cincinnati, telling the Associated Press that the player was "anxious to get back to pitching". He appeared in the sixth inning in a 13–3 loss, giving up four runs, including a home run to Frank Robinson in one inning of work. After the game, Umbricht said he felt "real good" despite the poor performance. The surgery took a toll on his leg: he required over 100 stitches, and blood seeped from the wound while he pitched at times. That year Umbricht posted a 4–3 win–loss record and a 2.61 earned run average in 35 games. He played his last game on September 29, 1963, the final day of the regular season, and picked up the win in relief. By that time, Umbricht's cancer had started to spread throughout his body and he needed to be sedated at times because of the pain. In November, Umbricht learned that the cancer spread to his chest area and was incurable. He was released from his contract on December 16 due to his deteriorating health. The National League allowed the Colts to sign Umbricht to a scout contract given the circumstances, with the proviso that it would become a player contract if he rejoined the active roster.

=== Final months and death ===
By early 1964, Umbricht was constantly in and out of hospital for further treatment, but was only given a few months to live. When he was not hospitalized, Umbricht played golf and attended baseball dinners in his honor, often for a "most courageous athlete" award ceremony. Umbricht did not travel to Cocoa Beach for the Colts' spring training camp in late February. He returned to the hospital permanently on March 16, where his health steadily declined after a third operation. During his final hospital stay, the Colts' management, his family and the hospital staff agreed not to release any further details about his illness, though word had leaked that he was dying. He remained optimistic that he would beat the illness until his final days, stating that "everything will be ok" in an interview with United Press International sports editor Milton Richman. Umbricht succumbed to the disease on April 8, 1964. Umbricht's death came on the eve of the Colts' 1964 season, and at his funeral, Manager Harry Craft, coach Lum Harris, and teammates Bob Lillis, Ken Johnson, Dick Farrell, and Russ Kemmerer were the six pallbearers. Kemmerer, who in the off-season was a Methodist preacher, gave the eulogy during the service, and Umbricht's body was cremated. Construction of the Astrodome, the Colts' future ballpark, had begun a few weeks before Umbricht's death. His family decided to spread his ashes on its grounds, so the new ballpark "could be his headstone". After the funeral service, Umbricht's brother Ed flew a plane over the construction site and scattered his ashes.

== Aftermath and legacy ==
The day after Umbricht's death, the Colts decided to honor their teammate by wearing black armbands for the entire 1964 season. Umbricht's uniform number (32) was immediately retired by the team; it was the first time the club retired a uniform number, and only the twelfth time in Major League history a number was retired. In the Colts' opening-day match against the Cincinnati Reds, starting pitcher Ken Johnson dedicated his victory in Umbricht's memory. The Astros' MVP award was also named in his honor. The back of Umbricht's 1964 Topps baseball card was updated to mention his death shortly before printing. The retirement of Umbricht's number received some criticism, however. Former teammate Jimmy Wynn wrote in his autobiography that Walt Bond, a former Astros player who was African-American, died from leukemia while he was still active. His jersey number was not retired by the club after his death, although he appeared in more games for the Astros than Umbricht. (However, Bond ended his career not with Houston but as a member of the Minnesota Twins.) Journalists criticizing the retirement of numbers sometimes use Umbricht as an example of someone whose number was retired but who is unfamiliar to baseball fans.

Umbricht's death from melanoma helped alert the general public about the disease. Former Los Angeles Rams linebacker Jack Pardee credited Umbricht's battle with melanoma for saving his life in 1965. Pardee, a Pro Bowl linebacker, had been ignoring a mole on his armpit. After hearing of Umbricht's battle with cancer, and that his mole was similar to Umbricht's, he went to the team doctor, who diagnosed him with melanoma. Although Pardee's melanoma had also spread throughout his body, he made a complete recovery.

== See also ==
- List of baseball players who died during their careers

== Bibliography ==
- Cushing, Rick (2010). 1960 Pittsburgh Pirates: Day by Day: A Special Season, an Extraordinary World Series. Pittsburgh: Dorrance Publishing Co. ISBN 9781434904980.
- Zimniuch, Frank (2007). Shortened Seasons: The Untimely Deaths of Major League Baseball's Starts and Journeymen. Lanham, Maryland: Taylor Trade Publishing. ISBN 9781589793637.
