= Don Nottebart =

American baseball player (1936–2007)

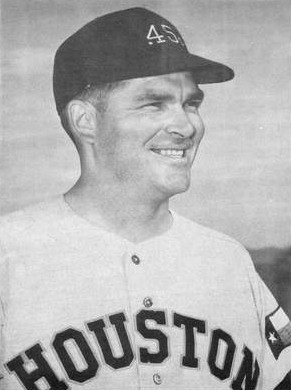
- Nottebart in 1963
- Pitcher
- Born: January 23, 1936; West Newton, Massachusetts, U.S.
- Died: October 4, 2007 (aged 71); Cypress, Texas, U.S.
- Batted: Right Threw: Right

MLB debut
- July 1, 1960, for the Milwaukee Braves

Last MLB appearance
- September 6, 1969, for the Chicago Cubs

MLB statistics
- Win–loss record: 36–51
- Earned run average: 3.65
- Strikeouts: 525
- Stats at Baseball Reference

Teams
- Milwaukee Braves (1960–1962); Houston Colt .45s / Astros (1963–1965); Cincinnati Reds (1966–1967); New York Yankees (1969); Chicago Cubs (1969)

Career highlights and awards
- Pitched a no-hitter on May 17, 1963

Donald Edward Nottebart (/ˈnɒtəbɑːrt/ NOT-ə-bart; January 23, 1936 – October 4, 2007) was an American professional baseball player. The right-handed pitcher appeared in 296 games in Major League Baseball for five teams over nine seasons (1960–1967; 1969). Nottebart pitched the first no-hitter in Houston Colt .45s/Astros history in 1963. He was listed as 6 feet 1 inch (1.85 m) tall and 190 pounds (86 kg).

== Early life ==
Nottebart was born in West Newton, Massachusetts, the second child of Fred and Otta Alice Nottebart. He was a three-sport star at Lexington High School, graduating in 1954. In 1955 he married high school sweetheart Joanne Wilson—they would eventually have four children. He was signed as an amateur free agent by the Milwaukee Braves in 1954.

== Career ==
He made his major league debut at age 24 on July 1, 1960, in an 8-7 Braves road loss to the St. Louis Cardinals. Nottebart started but had a rough debut, walking the first hitter he faced, Julián Javier, pitching six innings and allowing six earned runs, nine hits and eight walks; however, he was not charged with the loss.

After three years with the Braves, Nottebart was traded to Houston on November 30, 1962, along with two other players for veteran first baseman Norm Larker. He threw a 4–1 no-hitter for the Colt .45s against the Philadelphia Phillies on May 17, 1963, despite giving up an unearned run. Don Demeter reached base on an error by shortstop J. C. Hartman and later scored on a sacrifice fly by Phillies third baseman Don Hoak. His catcher was John Bateman.

That year was the best of his career to date, as he posted a record of 11–8 with a 3.17 earned run average in 31 games (of which he started 27, completing nine). Also in 1963, Nottebart was one of several of baseball players mentioned in a Peanuts comic strip. When Lucy gets hold of a bubble-gum card of Charlie Brown's (fictional) idol Joe Shlabotnik, he offers to trade dozens of cards, including Nottebart's, for Shlabotnik's, but she refuses.

On September 13, 1965, he gave up the 500th home run of Willie Mays.

After three years with Houston, he was acquired by the Cincinnati Reds in the 1965 Rule 5 draft. In 1966 for the Reds, he went 5–4 with a 3.07 ERA in a career-high 59 games (all but one as a reliever), ending in the National League top 10 in both saves and games pitched. The following year he was 0–3 but with a sterling 1.93 ERA in 47 games, all as a reliever.

In 1969 as part of a 30-day conditional purchase, he was acquired from the Reds by the New York Yankees, for whom he pitched four games before being returned to the Reds. One day later, on April 27, 1969, he was traded to the Chicago Cubs, for whom he pitched 16 games. His last major league game played was at age 33 on September 6, 1969. The final hitter he faced was Baseball Hall of Famer Roberto Clemente. A muscle tear ended both his season and his career.

Overall, Nottebart posted a 36–51 record and a 3.65 earned run average. In 296 games, 89 as a starting pitcher, he had 16 complete games and two shutouts, with 21 saves. He allowed 902 hits and 283 bases on balls, with 525 strikeouts, in 9281/3 innings pitched.

== Later life ==
After his retirement as a player, Nottebart and his wife Joanne lived in southwest Houston for about 25 years, where he had owned a carpet and flooring business and ran a service station. In 1996 he was a member of the inaugural class of the Lexington High School Athletic Hall of Fame.

In 1999 he suffered a stroke after undergoing heart bypass surgery, and his health declined. Nottebart died at age 71 on October 4, 2007, while visiting his daughter in Cypress, Texas. He was survived by his wife of nearly 52 years, Joanne; their three sons Ron, Bob and Dan and daughter Donna; 11 grandchildren; one great-grandchild; and sister Elaine and brother Reigh. On May 17, 2013, Joanne Nottebart and family gathered in Houston to commemorate the 50th anniversary of his no-hitter.

== See also ==
- List of Houston Astros no-hitters
- List of Major League Baseball no-hitters

Awards and achievements
Preceded by Sandy Koufax	No-hitter pitcher May 17, 1963	Succeeded by Juan Marichal
