= Jim Dickson (baseball) =

American baseball player (1938–2025)

- Pitcher
- Born: April 20, 1938; Portland, Oregon, U.S.
- Died: September 9, 2025 (aged 87); Astoria, Oregon, U.S.
- Batted: Left Threw: Right

MLB debut
- July 2, 1963, for the Houston Colt .45s

Last MLB appearance
- July 24, 1966, for the Kansas City Athletics

MLB statistics
- Win–loss record: 5–3
- Earned run average: 4.36
- Strikeouts: 86
- Stats at Baseball Reference

Teams
- Houston Colt .45s (1963); Cincinnati Reds (1964); Kansas City Athletics (1965–1966)

James Edward Dickson (April 20, 1938 – September 9, 2025) was an American professional baseball player, primarily a relief pitcher, who appeared in 109 games in Major League Baseball for the Houston Colt .45s, Cincinnati Reds and Kansas City Athletics over all or parts of four seasons from 1963 to 1966. Born in Portland, Oregon, he threw right-handed, batted left-handed, and was listed as 6 feet 1 inch (1.85 m) tall and 185 pounds (84 kg). He attended Clark College and the University of Oregon.

== Playing career ==
Dickson spent his first four years in professional baseball in the Pittsburgh Pirates' farm system until he was drafted by the Colt .45s, a first-year expansion team, after he won ten games in the Class B Three-I League in 1961.

He debuted for Houston in July 1963, and in his third appearance he earned his first major league save with 11/3 innings of scoreless relief, preserving Bob Bruce's 4–2 victory over the Milwaukee Braves on July 5. He gave up no runs and only one hit in his first four outings, but poor performances against the St. Louis Cardinals on July 20–21 and the Pirates on July 30 inflated his earned run average to 9.31 by the end of the month. On January 20, 1964, Dickson was traded with another young pitcher, Wally Wolf, to Cincinnati for veteran infielder Eddie Kasko. He worked in only four early-season games as a relief pitcher for the 1964 Reds, but gained his first major league victory on May 5 against the Pirates. He then won nine games as a reliever for Triple-A San Diego and was selected by Kansas City in the 1964 Rule 5 draft that November.

Dickson spent all of 1965 on the Athletics' roster, appearing in 68 games, fourth-most in the American League. He won three of five decisions, one of only two Kansas City pitchers to post a winning record for a 103-loss, last-place team. He registered no saves. He then began 1966 with the Athletics, and was less effective in 23 appearances with a 4.86 earned run average. On July 24, 1966, he was given his only major league starting pitcher assignment against the Washington Senators. Staked to a 4–0 lead in the first inning, he pitched well for the first three frames but then ran into trouble in the fourth, surrendering four runs, two coming on a home run by former teammate Ken Harrelson. Dickson earned a "no decision" in that contest, but he was sent down to Triple-A after that game and spent the remainder of his pro career in the top level of minor league baseball, bouncing around between the Athletics, San Francisco Giants, and Astros systems, before retiring after the 1970 season.

All told, in 1421/3 innings pitched in the majors, he allowed 135 hits and 77 bases on balls with 86 strikeouts. He won five of eight decisions and added three saves.

== Personal ==
After his playing career, Dickson worked as a coach for Astoria High School and was later a pitching coach in Italy for Grosseto in the Italian Serie A1.

Dickson died in Oregon on September 9, 2025 at the age of 87.
