= Howie Goss =

American baseball player (1934–1996)

- Center fielder
- Born: November 1, 1934; Wewoka, Oklahoma, U.S.
- Died: July 31, 1996 (aged 61); Reno, Nevada, U.S.
- Batted: Right Threw: Right

MLB debut
- April 10, 1962, for the Pittsburgh Pirates

Last MLB appearance
- September 28, 1963, for the Houston Colt .45s

MLB statistics
- Batting average: .216
- Home runs: 11
- Runs batted in: 54
- Stats at Baseball Reference

Teams
- Pittsburgh Pirates (1962); Houston Colt .45s (1963)

Howard Wayne Goss (November 1, 1934 – July 31, 1996) was an American professional baseball player who appeared in two seasons (1963–1964) in the Major Leagues as an outfielder for the Pittsburgh Pirates and Houston Colt .45s (later the Houston Astros).

Born in Wewoka, Oklahoma, Goss threw and batted right-handed, stood 6 feet 4 inches (1.93 m) tall and weighed 204 pounds (93 kg). He spent nine years in minor league baseball, hitting 172 home runs, before making his first Major League team, the 1962 Pirates. He was mostly a late-inning replacement that season for regular left fielder Bob Skinner, a left-handed batter, although Goss did start 15 games in right field, normally the domain of Hall of Famer Roberto Clemente. He showed some power potential with a .351 slugging average playing in cavernous Forbes Field.

In the closing days of spring training in 1963, Goss was traded to the Colt .45s for a then-unknown 25-year-old outfielder, Manny Mota. While Goss would be Houston's regular 1963 center fielder, he batted only .209 in 411 at bats and finished his professional career in the minor leagues in 1964. Mota went on to play 19 more seasons in the National League, and became particularly well known for his pinch hitting, at one time holding the Major League record for pinch hits.

Howie Goss appeared in 222 Major League games, with 522 at bats. His 113 hits including 24 doubles and 11 home runs. He died at age 61 in Reno, Nevada.

== Sources ==
- MLB Player Statistics Howie Goss
- Career statistics from Baseball Reference · Retrosheet · Baseball Almanac
