= Conrad Cardinal =

American baseball player (1942–2026)

- Pitcher
- Born: March 30, 1942; New York City, U.S.
- Died: April 28, 2026 (aged 84); Central, Utah, U.S.
- Batted: Right Threw: Right

MLB debut
- April 11, 1963, for the Houston Colt .45s

Last MLB appearance
- May 4, 1963, for the Houston Colt .45s

MLB statistics
- Win–loss record: 0–1
- Earned run average: 6.08
- Strikeouts: 7
- Stats at Baseball Reference

Teams
- Houston Colt .45s (1963)

Conrad Seth "Randy" Cardinal (March 30, 1942 – April 28, 2026) was an American professional baseball pitcher who appeared in six games in Major League Baseball for the Houston Colt .45s in 1963. Born in Brooklyn and of Italian descent via his father's side and Jewish descent via his mother's side, he attended Valley Stream High School in Valley Stream, New York. Cardinal threw and batted right-handed; he was listed as 6 feet 1 inch (1.85 m) tall and 190 pounds (86 kg).

== Biography ==
Cardinal's four-year professional career began in 1962 in the Detroit Tigers' organization. After winning 14 games in the Class D New York–Penn League that season, he was selected by Houston in the first-year player draft in November, then made the 1963 Colt .45s' 28-man early-season roster out of spring training. In his MLB debut April 11, he worked three innings of middle relief and allowed three hits and one earned run, while striking out three, against the defending National League champion San Francisco Giants. One of his strikeout victims was Willie Mays. Ten days later, he made his only big-league start against eventual 1963 NL and World Series champion Los Angeles at Dodger Stadium. But he lasted only two-thirds of an inning, allowing five runs (three earned) on three hits and three bases on balls, and was tagged with the 11–3 defeat, his only career MLB decision. He worked in three more games in relief between April 23 and May 4, before he was sent to the Double-A Texas League.

He never returned to the majors. In his six appearances, he allowed 15 hits and seven bases on balls, and registered seven strikeouts, in 131/3 innings pitched. His minor league baseball career lasted into the 1965 season.

Cardinal died on April 28, 2026, at the age of 84.
