= John Bateman (baseball) =

American baseball player (1940–1996)

- Catcher
- Born: July 21, 1940; Fort Sill, Oklahoma, U.S.
- Died: December 3, 1996 (aged 56); Sand Springs, Oklahoma, U.S.
- Batted: Right Threw: Right

MLB debut
- April 19, 1963, for the Houston Colt .45s

Last MLB appearance
- October 3, 1972, for the Philadelphia Phillies

MLB statistics
- Batting average: .230
- Home runs: 81
- Runs batted in: 375
- Stats at Baseball Reference

Teams
- Houston Colt .45s / Astros (1963–1968); Montreal Expos (1969–1972); Philadelphia Phillies (1972)

John Alvin Bateman (July 21, 1940 – December 3, 1996) was an American professional baseball catcher, who played in Major League Baseball (MLB) for the Houston Colt .45s / Astros, Montreal Expos, and Philadelphia Phillies. Bateman batted and threw right-handed. During his playing days, he stood 6 feet 3 inches (1.91 m) tall, weighing 210 pounds (95 kg).

Born in Killeen, Texas, Bateman grew up in Lawton, Oklahoma and attended Lawton High School. He signed with the expansion Houston Colt .45s, as an amateur free agent, in 1962. In 10 MLB seasons, Bateman compiled a .230 lifetime batting average; he ended his big league career with the Phillies.

== Houston Colt .45s ==
1963 Sportservice photo of Bateman for Houston Colt .45s

Bateman clubbed 22 home runs for the minor league Modesto Colts in 1962, and made the Colt .45s out of spring training the following season as Jim Campbell's back-up behind the plate. Campbell, however, sputtered, and soon lost his starting job to Bateman. On May 17, 1963, Bateman caught the first no-hitter in Houston franchise history. Don Nottebart held the Philadelphia Phillies hitless in a 4–1 Houston win. For the season, Bateman batted .210 while leading his team with ten home runs and 59 runs batted in. He then split time behind the plate with Jerry Grote in 1964.

== Houston Astros ==
In 1965, the Colt .45s rebranded as the Astros. During that first season in the Astrodome, Bateman struggled, ultimately spending almost half the season with the AAA Oklahoma City 89ers. While in the big leagues, he managed only a .197 batting average, with seven home runs — and spending only 39 games behind the dish — while backing up starting catcher Ron Brand.

In 1966, Bateman won back his starting job behind the plate, and set a franchise record with sixteen home runs by a catcher; the record was tied by Jason Castro in 2013, who hit two more as a designated hitter.

== Montreal Expos ==
Bateman and Brand shared catching duties for the Astros through the 1968 season. On October 14, 1968, Bateman was drafted by the Montreal Expos as the sixth overall pick in the 1968 Major League Baseball expansion draft; 52 picks later, the Expos selected Brand, and the two resumed their platoon in Montreal. Bateman batted sixth in the inaugural game versus the New York Mets on April 8, 1969, going 1-for-5 in the 11-10 win.

As he had with Houston, Bateman also caught the Expos' first no-hitter: the first of Bill Stoneman's two, on April 17, 1969 against the Philadelphia Phillies, in only the ninth game in the franchise's history.

In 1970 for Montreal, Bateman was second on the team in hits and triples, third on the team in home runs, runs batted in, doubles, extra-base hits, and stolen bases. That season Bateman also led all MLB catchers in stolen bases with eight, and finished 25th in the National League in power/speed.

Bateman was a member of the Expos in October 1970, during the October Crisis gripping Canada. Bateman was friendly with the Montreal police, and on November 6, the hiding place of one of the Front de libération du Québec (FLQ) terrorist cells was discovered. Expos manager Gene Mauch was watching coverage of the events with his staff and was not amused to see Bateman's bulky frame coming out of the hiding place on national television.

== Philadelphia Phillies ==
On June 14, 1972, Bateman was traded to the Philadelphia Phillies for Tim McCarver. He was released at the end of the season to make room for rookie prospect Bob Boone behind the plate. Steve Carlton was 7-6 with a 2.86 ERA before Bateman was traded to the Phillies. With Bateman catching the rest of Carlton's starts that season, Carlton was 20-4 with a 1.60 ERA. Carlton called Bateman the best signal caller he ever played with, and unsuccessfully lobbied the Phillies' front office to re-sign Bateman in 1973.

== The King and His Court ==
Bateman toured with the Fast Pitch softball team The King and His Court from 1977 to 1980. He acquired his softball skills while playing for the Texas State Amateur Softball Champion Houston Bombers.
