= Dave Adlesh =

American baseball player (1943–2016)

- Catcher
- Born: July 15, 1943; Long Beach, California, U.S.
- Died: February 15, 2016 (aged 72); Long Beach, California, U.S.
- Batted: Right Threw: Right

MLB debut
- May 12, 1963, for the Houston Colt .45s

Last MLB appearance
- September 28, 1968, for the Houston Astros

MLB statistics
- Batting average: .168
- Home runs: 1
- Runs batted in: 11
- Stats at Baseball Reference

Teams
- Houston Colt .45s/Astros (1963–1968)

David George Adlesh (July 15, 1943 – February 15, 2016) was an American professional baseball player. He played as a catcher in Major League Baseball from 1963 to 1968. He played his entire major league career with the Houston Colt .45's/Astros. Adlesh threw and batted right-handed.

Adlesh was signed as an amateur free agent by the Houston Colt .45's in 1962 out of St. Anthony High School (California). The Colt .45's thought highly enough of Adlesh's defensive skills that they brought him to the major leagues almost at once, with Adlesh appearing in his first game on May 12 of that year. He went 0 for 8 as a hitter in his brief stint and was soon shipped to the minor leagues. Adlesh split his time between the minors and Houston every year from 1963 to 1966.

On June 18, 1967, Adlesh caught the first of Don Wilson's two career no-hitters.

When Adlesh's major league days were over, he had a career batting average of .168, with a slugging percentage of .199, and one career home run. His strikeouts (80) were nearly the double number of his career hits (43).

Adlesh died February 15, 2016, after a long battle with cancer.
