= Glenn Vaughan =

American baseball player (1944-2004)

- Shortstop
- Born: February 16, 1944; Compton, California, U.S.
- Died: December 18, 2004 (aged 60); Houston, Texas, U.S.
- Batted: Switch Threw: Right

MLB debut
- September 20, 1963, for the Houston Colt .45s

Last MLB appearance
- September 29, 1963, for the Houston Colt .45s

MLB statistics
- Batting average: .167
- Home runs: 0
- Runs batted in: 0
- Stats at Baseball Reference

Teams
- Houston Colt .45s (1963)

Glenn Edward Vaughan (February 16, 1944 – December 18, 2004), nicknamed "Sparky", was an American professional baseball player for three seasons, 1962–1964. A shortstop, he was the nephew of Baseball Hall of Fame shortstop Arky Vaughan. He was a switch hitter who threw right-handed, stood 5 feet 11 inches (1.80 m) tall and weighed 170 pounds (77 kg).

Born in Compton, California, Glenn Vaughan graduated from Lamar High School in Houston, Texas and attended the University of Houston. In 1962 he signed with the local Major League Baseball team, the Houston Colt .45s, and played three seasons in its farm system. In 1963, he was recalled by the Colt .45s in September after splitting the campaign between the Double-A San Antonio Bullets and the Triple-A Oklahoma City 89ers. He started nine MLB games — eight as a shortstop, and one, on September 27, as a third baseman on a day when Houston started an all-rookie lineup (Sonny Jackson was the shortstop). Vaughan batted 30 times and collected five hits, all singles with no home runs or RBI.

After retiring from baseball, Vaughan entered the insurance and real estate businesses in Houston. He died from natural causes at the age of 60.
