= Johnny Weekly =

American baseball player (1937-1974)

- Outfielder
- Born: June 14, 1937; Waterproof, Louisiana, U.S.
- Died: November 24, 1974 (aged 37); Walnut Creek, California, U.S.
- Batted: Right Threw: Right

MLB debut
- April 13, 1962, for the Houston Colt .45s

Last MLB appearance
- April 23, 1964, for the Houston Colt .45s

MLB statistics
- Batting average: .207
- Home runs: 5
- Runs batted in: 19
- Stats at Baseball Reference

Teams
- Houston Colt .45s (1962–1964)

John Weekly (June 14, 1937 – November 24, 1974) was an American professional baseball player whose career extended from 1956 through 1965. The outfielder appeared in 53 Major League games for the Houston Colt .45s from 1962 to 1964. Weekly batted and threw right-handed; he stood 6 feet (1.8 m) tall and weighed 200 pounds (91 kg).

He was born in Waterproof in Tensas Parish, Louisiana, but graduated from high school in Pittsburg, California, and attended Diablo Valley College in Pleasant Hill, California. His career began in the New York Giants' organization, but was never called up by the MLB Giants, who moved to Weekly's home San Francisco Bay Area in 1958. Instead, he was selected in the 1961 Rule 5 draft by expansion team Houston, set to enter the Majors in 1962. Weekly's big-league debut came in the Colt .45s fourth-ever game, on April 13. He grounded out to the second baseman as a pinch hitter off Jack Hamilton of the Philadelphia Phillies in the ninth inning of a 3–2 defeat at Connie Mack Stadium. Six days later, he collected his first MLB hit: a solo home run off the Chicago Cubs' Don Cardwell in a 6-0 Houston triumph at Wrigley Field. Weekly was returned to the Giants' system in mid-May after starting five games in the outfield and 13 total appearances; his five hits included three extra-base blows, among them his second big-league homer (off Pete Richert of the Los Angeles Dodgers) on May 7.

After finishing 1962 with the Triple-A Tacoma Giants, he was reacquired by Houston and assigned to the Triple-A Oklahoma City 89ers, where he had his finest minor league season in 1963, batting .363 with 86 hits in 67 games. That earned him a promotion to the Colt .45s in midseason for a 34-game stint. Weekly batted .225 with three home runs and 18 hits. His high-water mark came September 18, with three extra base hits in five at bats against the Cincinnati Reds, including two doubles off Cincinnati fireballer Jim Maloney. He drove in four runs and hit his fifth and final big-league homer off the Reds' Dom Zanni.

Weekly made the Houston roster coming out of spring training in 1964, but made only two hits in 15 at bats and returned to Oklahoma City. On June 15, he was traded to the Baltimore Orioles, but logged only nine games for the Orioles' Triple-A affiliate before returning to the Houston organization. After one more full year with the 89ers, in 1965, Weekly left professional baseball. He died from injuries sustained in a road accident in Walnut Creek, California on November 24, 1974.
