= Ivan Murrell =

Panamanian baseball player (1943–2006)

- Outfielder
- Born: April 24, 1943; Almirante, Panama
- Died: October 8, 2006 (aged 63); Stuart, Florida, U.S.
- Batted: Right Threw: Right

MLB debut
- September 28, 1963, for the Houston Colt .45's

Last MLB appearance
- October 2, 1974, for the Atlanta Braves

MLB statistics
- Batting average: .236
- Home runs: 33
- Runs batted in: 123
- Stats at Baseball Reference

Teams
- Houston Colt .45's/Astros (1963–1964, 1967–1968); San Diego Padres (1969–1972); Atlanta Braves (1974)

Ivan Augustus Murrell Peters (April 24, 1943 – October 8, 2006) was a Panamanian professional baseball outfielder. He played in Major League Baseball (MLB) for the Houston Colt .45's / Astros, San Diego Padres and Atlanta Braves in all or parts of nine seasons spanning 1963–1974. Listed at 6' 2", 195 lb., Murrell batted and threw right handed. He was born in Almirante, Panama.

Murrell played in part of four seasons for Houston teams before being chosen by San Diego in the 1968 Major League Baseball expansion draft. His most productive season came in 1970 with the Padres, when he posted career-highs in home runs (12), RBI (35), runs (41), hits (85) and games played (125). He played his last major league season for the Braves.

In a career that spanned a decade, Murrell was a .236 hitter with 33 home runs and 123 RBI in 564 games.

In 1989, Murrell joined the St. Lucie Legends of the Senior Professional Baseball Association, hitting .272 with five home runs in 47 games. He also worked as a scout and a minor league coach for the Houston Astros organization.

Murrell died in Stuart, Florida, at age 63.

== See also ==
- List of players from Panama in Major League Baseball
