= Larry Yellen =

American baseball player (1943–2023)

- Pitcher
- Born: January 4, 1943; Brooklyn, New York, U.S.
- Died: July 18, 2023 (aged 80); Union City, Georgia, U.S.
- Batted: Right Threw: Right

MLB debut
- September 26, 1963, for the Houston Colt .45s

Last MLB appearance
- October 3, 1964, for the Houston Colt .45s

MLB statistics
- Win–loss record: 0–0
- Earned run average: 6.23
- Strikeouts: 12
- Stats at Baseball Reference

Teams
- Houston Colt .45s (1963–1964)

Lawrence Alan Yellen (January 4, 1943 − July 18, 2023) was an American professional baseball pitcher. He was born in Brooklyn, New York, and was Jewish. Yellen pitched in 14 games in Major League Baseball for the Houston Colt .45s in 1963 and 1964.

Yellen died on July 18, 2023, at the age of 80.
