= Mike White (baseball) =

American baseball player (1938–2025)

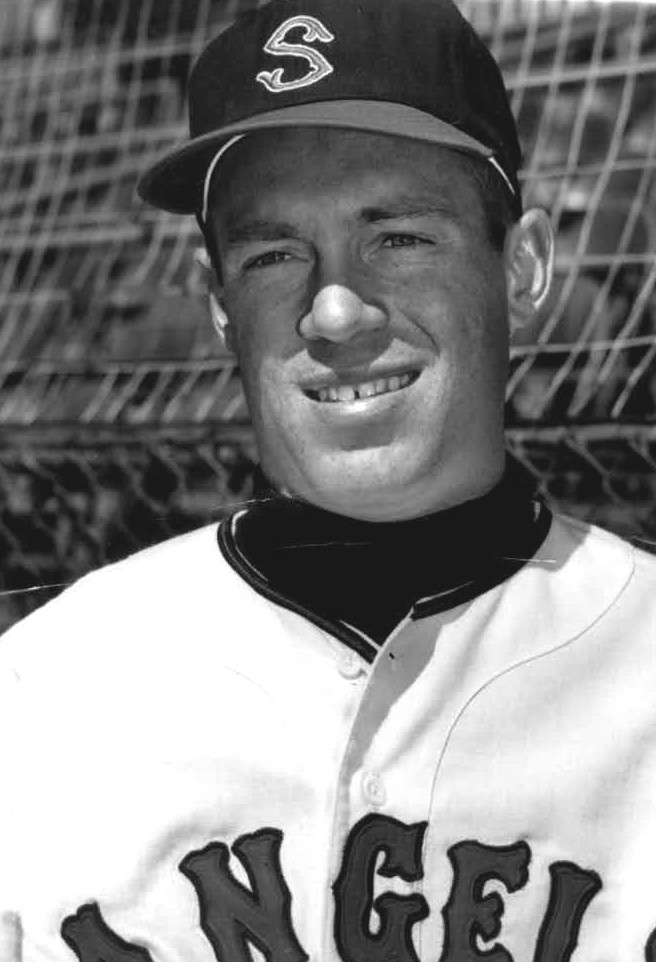
- Center fielder, second baseman
- Born: December 18, 1938; Detroit, Michigan, U.S.
- Died: August 25, 2025 (aged 86); Sun Lakes, Arizona, U.S.
- Batted: Right Threw: Right

MLB debut
- September 21, 1963, for the Houston Colt .45s

Last MLB appearance
- May 5, 1965, for the Houston Astros

MLB statistics
- Batting average: .264
- Home runs: 0
- Runs batted in: 27
- Stats at Baseball Reference

Teams
- Houston Colt .45s/Astros (1963–1965)

Joyner Michael White (December 18, 1938 – August 25, 2025) was an American professional baseball player. Primarily an outfielder, White appeared in Major League Baseball for all or parts of three seasons (1963–65) for the Houston Colt .45s / Astros. He is the son of the late Jo-Jo White, an MLB outfielder and coach. Mike White threw and batted right-handed, stood 5 feet 8 inches (1.73 m) tall and weighed 160 pounds (73 kg).

White attended American River Junior College, Sacramento, California, and signed with the Cleveland Indians in 1958; his father was a Cleveland scout and coach that season. But White suffered a serious knee injury in a 1958 intrasquad game and his career was nearly ended before it began. Despite constant therapy, he ran with a pronounced limp. White was able to play 126 minor league games in 1959 and 127 more in 1960. During the latter season, he batted .304 with 132 hits for the Reading Indians of the Class A Eastern League. But the Indians released him on December 8, 1960.

However, baseball was in the process of adding four new expansion teams during the 1961 and 1962 seasons. White kept his career going by signing with the Los Angeles Angels' minor league organization for 1961. He moved from third base to the outfield and later became a second baseman as well. After one year in the Angels' farm system, he was drafted by another expansion team, the Colt .45s, during the winter before their debut 1962 season. White batted .294 and .324 in successive seasons in the high minors before making his debut with the Colt .45s in September 1963. He collected two singles in seven at bats over three MLB games.

White spent the entire 1964 campaign with Houston, primarily as a center fielder, and batted .271 with 76 hits in 89 games. But in 1965, White appeared in only eight games for the renamed Astros, mostly as a pinch hitter. He was hitless in nine at bats and returned to the minor leagues for the remainder of his career. He retired in 1969.

White died on August 25, 2025, aged 86.

== See also ==
- List of second generation MLB players
