= Jim Campbell (catcher) =

American baseball player (born 1937)

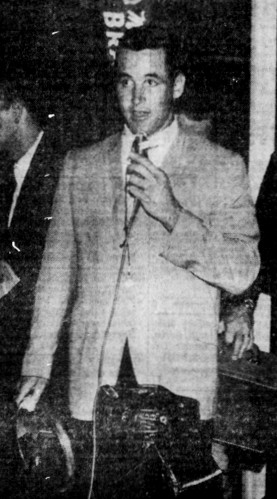
- Catcher
- Born: June 24, 1937; Palo Alto, California, U.S.
- Died: October 17, 2024 (aged 87); Los Altos, California, U.S.
- Batted: Right Threw: Right

MLB debut
- July 17, 1962, for the Houston Colt .45s

Last MLB appearance
- July 23, 1963, for the Houston Colt .45s

MLB statistics
- Batting average: .221
- Home runs: 7
- Runs batted in: 25
- Stats at Baseball Reference

Teams
- Houston Colt .45s (1962–1963)

James Robert Campbell (June 24, 1937 – October 17, 2024) was an American former professional baseball player, a catcher who played 82 games in the Major Leagues for the Houston Colt .45s during 1962 and 1963. He threw and batted right-handed, stood 6 feet (1.8 m) tall and weighed 190 pounds (86 kg).

Campbell was acquired by the Colt .45s over a full season before the team played an official big-league game. He'd signed originally with the Pittsburgh Pirates in 1955, was briefly loaned to the Chicago White Sox organization, and played for six seasons without reaching the Double-A level. After the 1960 minor-league season, he was drafted by the Milwaukee Braves, then traded on February 23, 1961, to the newborn Colt .45s, founded as a National League expansion team set to debut in 1962. To prepare for their first MLB season, the Colt .45s — known as the Astros since 1965 — were acquiring minor league players to stock their organization and loaning them to other teams' minor-league clubs. Campbell was assigned to the 1961 Houston Buffs, the Triple-A affiliate of the Chicago Cubs and the last minor-league team to represent Houston. Campbell was the Buffs' first-string catcher in 1961 and then was assigned to the Colt .45s' top 1962 affiliate, the Oklahoma City 89ers of the American Association.

Campbell batted .350 in 70 games played for the 89ers and earned a promotion to the big-league Colt .45s in July. He appeared in 27 games over the remainder of 1962, 25 as a starting catcher, and batted .221 with three home runs and six runs batted in. He then began the 1963 season on the Houston roster, caught the opening day game against the defending league champion San Francisco Giants, and started the next four games in succession. But he collected only one hit and was batting only .056 when he was replaced in the lineup by veteran Hal Smith. Campbell batted only .118 in April and it would be June 5 before his average climbed above the .200 level. On July 23, he made his final MLB appearance as a pinch hitter, singling in the seventh inning off Dallas Green of the Philadelphia Phillies in a game Houston would eventually win in 15 innings. It was his 54th Major League hit; in addition to his seven career home runs, he had seven doubles.

Campbell finished 1963 with Oklahoma City and continued his minor league career at Triple-A through 1965.

Campbell died on October 17, 2024.
