= Russ Kemmerer =

American baseball player (1930–2014)

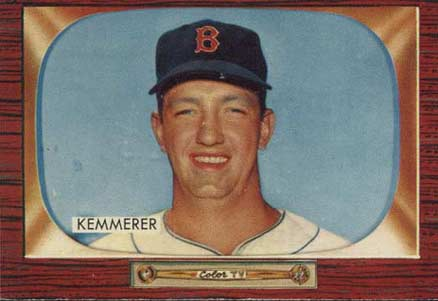
- Pitcher
- Born: November 1, 1930; Pittsburgh, Pennsylvania, U.S.
- Died: December 8, 2014 (aged 84); Indianapolis, Indiana, U.S.
- Batted: Right Threw: Right

MLB debut
- June 27, 1954, for the Boston Red Sox

Last MLB appearance
- June 23, 1963, for the Houston Colt .45's

MLB statistics
- Win–loss record: 43–59
- Earned run average: 4.46
- Strikeouts: 505
- Stats at Baseball Reference

Teams
- Boston Red Sox (1954–1955, 1957); Washington Senators (1957–1960); Chicago White Sox (1960–1962); Houston Colt .45's (1962–1963)

Russell Paul Kemmerer (November 1, 1930 – December 8, 2014) was an American professional baseball player. He was a right-handed pitcher who played for the Boston Red Sox (1954–1957), the Washington Senators (1957–1960), the Chicago White Sox (1960–1962), and the Houston Colt .45s (1962–1963) to finish his career.

== Baseball career ==
The 6 ft 2 in (1.88 m)-tall, 198 lb (90 kg) Kemmerer attended the University of Pittsburgh.

Kemmerer debuted for the Sox on June 27, 1954. Kemmerer switched off between relief and starting in his early years, starting eleven games for the Red Sox, while appearing in twenty-seven for the team, before being traded to Washington. By the latter part of his career, he was strictly used out of the bullpen. On June 22, 1962, he was traded to Houston for left-handed pitcher Dean Stone; ironically, Stone was one of the players obtained by Boston on April 29, 1957, when they traded Kemmerer to the Senators. Kemmerer ended his MLB career with Houston on June 23, 1963, although he pitched in the Triple-A Pacific Coast League through the following season.

Kemmerer finished with 43 wins and 59 losses, good for a .422 winning percentage in a nine-year career. He pitched in 302 games (starting 109) and completed 24 of them (2 of those shutouts). He finished with 1066 2/3 innings pitched, 505 strike outs, and a 4.46 ERA. He allowed a total of 1144 hits, 588 runs, and 389 walks.

As a batter, Kemmerer finished with a .128 batting average.

== Post-baseball ==
Following his MLB career, Kemmerer entered the pastoral ministry and coached youth sports. He died on December 8, 2014.

== See also ==
- List of University of Pittsburgh people
