= Danny Coombs =

American baseball player (born 1942)

- Pitcher
- Born: March 23, 1942 (age 84); Lincoln, Maine, U.S.
- Batted: Right Threw: Left

MLB debut
- September 27, 1963, for the Houston Colt .45s

Last MLB appearance
- July 23, 1971, for the San Diego Padres

MLB statistics
- Win–loss record: 19–27
- Earned run average: 4.08
- Strikeouts: 249
- Stats at Baseball Reference

Teams
- Houston Colt .45s / Astros (1963–1969); San Diego Padres (1970–1971)

Daniel Bernard Coombs (born March 23, 1942) is an American former Major League Baseball relief pitcher who played from 1963 to 1971 for the Houston Colt .45s / Astros and San Diego Padres.

== Career ==
Coombs was 6 ft 5 in (1.96 m) tall, weighed 210 pounds (95 kg), and he attended Seton Hall University. While he was at Seton Hall, he also played basketball.

Signed as an amateur free-agent before the 1963 season, Coombs made his major league debut later that year. On September 27, 1963, against the New York Mets, Coombs pitched one third of an inning, allowing three hits and one earned run.

In seven games in 1964, Coombs struck out 14 batters in 18 innings, posting a 5.00 ERA. He won the first game of his career that year in the final game he pitched that season, earning a win on October 2 against the Los Angeles Dodgers.

Coombs appeared in 26 games in 1965, allowing 54 hits and 25 earned runs in 47 innings for a 4.79 ERA.

In 1966, Coombs appeared in only two games, striking out three in 2 2/3 innings. He posted a 3.38 ERA. 1967 was also a short season for him — he appeared in only six games, going 3–0 with a 3.33 ERA.

In 1968. Coombs appeared in 40 games, going 4–3 with a 3.28 ERA. Coombs appeared in only eight games in 1969, posting a 6.75 ERA in eight innings of work. On October 22 of that year, he was purchased by the Padres.

1970 was the only season where Coombs was used almost entirely as a starter. He appeared in 35 games, starting 27 of them. He went 10–14 with a 3.30 ERA and 105 strikeouts in 188 1/3 innings of work. His 3.30 ERA was the best on the team among all pitchers with at least five appearances, and second best overall. Steve Arlin posted a 2.84 ERA in two games, beating him out. Coombs' 3.30 ERA was also the ninth best ERA in the league that year.

Coombs played his final season in 1971. In 19 games (six starts), he posted a 1–6 record with a 6.24 ERA. He played his final game on July 23, 1971.

Overall, Coombs played nine seasons in the majors. Of the 144 games he pitched in, he started 42 of them, completing five of his starts, shutting out one game and saving two games. He posted a 19–27 record in 393 innings of work, allowing 433 hits, 209 runs, 178 earned runs and 26 home runs. He walked 162 batters and struck out 249. His ERA was 4.08. As a batter, Coombs collected 14 hits in 100 at-bats for a .140 batting average.

== Sources ==
- Career statistics from MLB · Baseball Reference · Fangraphs · Baseball Reference (Minors) · Retrosheet · Baseball Almanac, or Retrosheet
