= J. C. Hartman =

American baseball player (born 1934)

J C Hartman
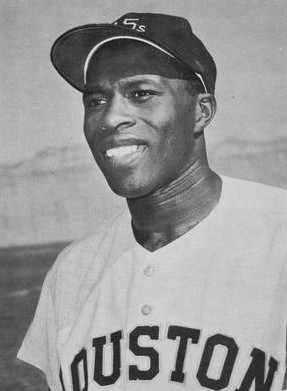
- Shortstop
- Born: April 15, 1934 (age 92); Cottonton, Alabama, U.S.
- Batted: Right Threw: Right

MLB debut
- July 21, 1962, for the Houston Colt .45s

Last MLB appearance
- July 1, 1963, for the Houston Colt .45s

MLB statistics
- Batting average: .185
- Home runs: 0
- Runs batted in: 8
- Stats at Baseball Reference

Teams
- Houston Colt .45s (1962–63)

J C Hartman (born April 15, 1934) is an American former professional baseball player and Major League Baseball shortstop who appeared in 90 games over parts of two seasons, 1962 and 1963, for the Houston Colt .45s. He also played in the Negro leagues for the Kansas City Monarchs in 1955, when they were a barnstorming team. He was nicknamed "Cool" and "The Spider", the latter because of his arms and legs, which extended to prodigious lengths when he ranged after ground balls. The 6 ft (1.8 m), 175 lb (79 kg) Hartman, a native of Cottonton, Alabama, threw and batted right-handed.

Hartman's career in minor league baseball began in 1959 at the Double-A level in the Chicago Cubs' system. He played for the Triple-A Houston Buffs in 1961 and was acquired by the expansion Colt .45s that winter before their maiden National League season. Recalled from Triple-A in midseason 1962, he backed up regular Colt .45 shortstop Bob Lillis, starting in 42 games through the end of the year and hitting .223. He then began 1963 on the Houston roster and appeared in 39 total games, 21 as a starting shortstop, before returning to the minors, where he played through 1967.

As a big leaguer, he collected 44 hits, including six doubles, and eight runs batted in.

After baseball, in 1973, Hartman began what would be the very first African American supervisor with the Houston Police Department. Hartman was recently awarded the Lifetime Achievement Award by HPD. Before baseball Hartman was in the United States Army where he served as a Paratrooper. Recognitions from the U.S. Army include a U.S. Army Good Conduct Award, U.S. Army Parachutist Badge and U.S. Army Honorable Discharge.
