= Brock Davis =

American baseball player (born 1943)

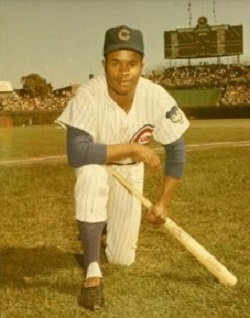
- Outfielder
- Born: October 19, 1943 (age 82); Oakland, California, U.S.
- Batted: Left Threw: Left

MLB debut
- April 9, 1963, for the Houston Colt .45s

Last MLB appearance
- October 4, 1972, for the Milwaukee Brewers

MLB statistics
- Batting average: .260
- Home runs: 1
- Runs batted in: 43
- Stats at Baseball Reference

Teams
- Houston Colt .45s / Astros (1963–1966); Chicago Cubs (1970–1971); Milwaukee Brewers (1972)

Bryshear Barnett "Brock" Davis (born October 19, 1943) is an American former Major League Baseball outfielder whose professional career, including minor league service, lasted for 13 seasons (1963–1975). Davis was born in Oakland, California and attended John C. Fremont High School in Los Angeles and California State University, Los Angeles. Davis attended high school with future professional baseball players Leon McFadden, Willie Crawford, Bobby Tolan and Bob Watson. He threw and batted left-handed, stood 5 feet 10 inches (1.78 m) tall and weighed 165 pounds (75 kg).

Davis made his big league debut at age 19 with the Houston Colt .45s on April 9, 1963. He appeared in 34 games during the 1963 season (including the September 27 game in which all nine of the Colts starters were rookies) but did not see significant action in the major leagues again until 1971, when he played for the Chicago Cubs.

He was traded along with Jim Colborn and Earl Stephenson by the Cubs to the Milwaukee Brewers for outfielder José Cardenal on December 3, 1971. Davis batted .318 in 1972 in a utility role with the Brewers. His final game as a major-leaguer was on October 4, 1972.

All told, in 242 MLB games played, he collected 141 hits, including 12 doubles and five triples, 43 runs batted in. On June 14, 1963, Davis hit the only home run of his major league career, against Jack Sanford of the San Francisco Giants.
