= Bob Bruce =

American baseball player (1933–2017)

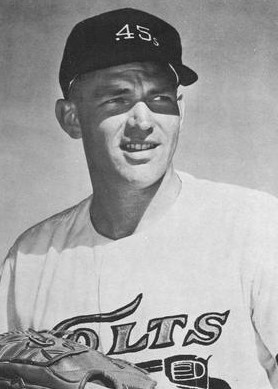
- Pitcher
- Born: May 16, 1933; New York, New York, U.S.
- Died: March 14, 2017 (aged 83); Plano, Texas, U.S.
- Batted: Right Threw: Right

MLB debut
- September 14, 1959, for the Detroit Tigers

Last MLB appearance
- June 24, 1967, for the Atlanta Braves

MLB statistics
- Win–loss record: 49–71
- Earned run average: 3.85
- Strikeouts: 733
- Stats at Baseball Reference

Teams
- Detroit Tigers (1959–1961); Houston Colt .45s / Astros (1962–1966); Atlanta Braves (1967)

Robert James Bruce (May 16, 1933 – March 14, 2017) was an American professional baseball player, a right-handed pitcher who appeared in 219 games in Major League Baseball from 1959 to 1967 for the Detroit Tigers, Houston Colt .45s / Astros, and Atlanta Braves.

Born in New York, New York, and raised by adoptive parents in Detroit, Michigan, Bruce graduated from Highland Park High School and attended Alma College. He was listed as 6 feet 3 inches (1.91 m) tall and 200 pounds (91 kg).

== Baseball career ==
Bruce began his professional career in 1953 in the minor league system of his hometown Tigers. He won 18 games in the Class D Wisconsin State League in his first season and began a steady rise through the Detroit farm system. He missed part of 1956 and all of 1957 while serving in the United States Army, and debuted with Detroit at the tail end of 1959, working in two games. In 1960, Bruce spent the entire season with the Tigers, appearing in 34 games (making 15 starts during the latter half of the season) and posting a 3.74 earned run average (ERA) in 130 innings pitched. However, a shoulder injury suffered early in the 1961 campaign derailed Bruce as he sought to cement a place in the Tigers' starting rotation. He worked in only 44 2/3 innings for Detroit, and was briefly sent to Triple-A Denver. On December 1, 1961, he was traded to the Houston Colt .45s, a first-year expansion team, for veteran pitcher Sam "Toothpick" Jones.

Bruce became a mainstay of the Houston starting rotation during the team's early years, tying Turk Farrell for the team lead in wins (with 10) in the Colt .45's inaugural 1962 season, and becoming the first Houston pitcher to win 15 games, in 1964.

On April 19, 1964, Bruce struck out all three batters on nine total pitches in the eighth inning of a 6–2 win over the Los Angeles Dodgers, becoming the seventh National League pitcher and the 12th pitcher in major-league history to throw an immaculate inning, one day after Sandy Koufax achieved the same feat. That season, Bruce also reached career bests in complete games (nine), shutouts (four), and ERA (2.76, 10th in the National League). He threw the last pitch in Colt Stadium on September 27, 1964, then on April 12, 1965, he threw the first pitch in the history of the Astrodome, as the Opening Day starting pitcher for the renamed Astros. He was Houston's hard-luck losing pitcher that day, surrendering a two-run, third-inning home run to Dick Allen, as the visiting Philadelphia Phillies prevailed, 2–1.

His last two seasons with Houston, 1965 and 1966, were disappointing. In the former year, he lost 18 of 27 decisions while posting seven complete games and a decent 3.76 ERA. He led the team in strikeouts (145), innings pitched (229.2), and runs allowed (107, 95 earned). In 1966, his record was 3–13 and his ERA rose to 5.34, a career worst, in 129 2/3 innings pitched. During the off-season, the Astros included him in a trade to the Atlanta Braves for Eddie Mathews, the future Baseball Hall of Fame third baseman then in the twilight of his career. Bruce got into only 12 games for the 1967 Braves before being sent to Triple-A Richmond, and then retired after the 1967 season. One notable achievement by Bruce during the 1967 season was picking up his one and only MLB save on June 14, 1967 against the Phillies.

In an MLB career that encompassed all or parts of nine years, Bruce compiled a 49–71 win–loss record, with 26 complete games (in 167 starts), six shutouts and one save. In 1122 1/3 innings pitched, he struck out 733, allowing 1,146 hits and 340 bases on balls. His career ERA was 3.85.

== Post-baseball ==
After leaving baseball, Bruce became a successful real estate developer, salesman and property manager in both Michigan and Texas. He died at age 83 in Plano, Texas.
