= Sonny Jackson =

American baseball player (born 1944)

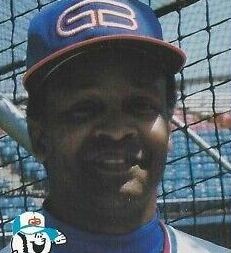
- Jackson as a coach with the Greenville Braves c. 1987
- Shortstop / Outfielder
- Born: July 9, 1944 (age 82); Washington, D.C., U.S.
- Batted: Left Threw: Right

MLB debut
- September 27, 1963, for the Houston Colt .45s

Last MLB appearance
- July 9, 1974, for the Atlanta Braves

MLB statistics
- Batting average: .251
- Home runs: 7
- Runs batted in: 162
- Stats at Baseball Reference

Teams
- As player: Houston Colt .45s / Astros (1963–1967); Atlanta Braves (1968–1974); As coach: Atlanta Braves (1982–1983); San Francisco Giants (1997–2002); Chicago Cubs (2003–2006)

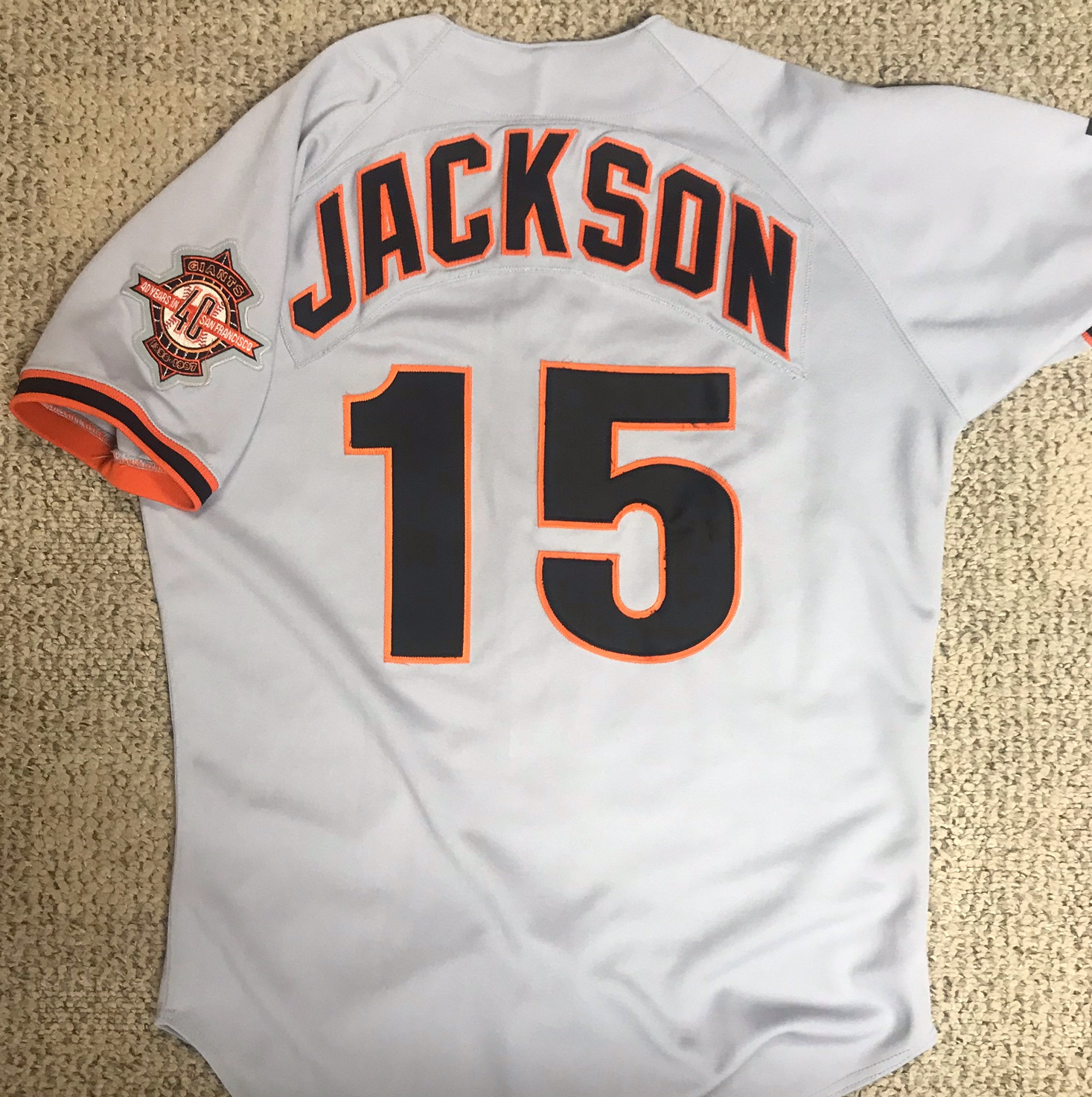
The 1997 San Francisco Giants #15 jersey Jackson wore for the Giants' away games

Roland Thomas "Sonny" Jackson (born July 9, 1944) is an American former professional baseball shortstop and outfielder for the Houston Colt .45's / Astros (1963–67) and Atlanta Braves (1968–74).

Jackson led the National League in singles (160) and sacrifice hits (27) in 1966. He helped the Braves win the NL Western Division in 1969.

In 12 seasons he played in 936 games and had 3,055 at bats, 396 runs, 767 hits, 81 doubles, 28 triples, 7 home runs, 162 RBI, 126 stolen bases, 250 walks, .251 batting average, .308 on-base percentage, .303 slugging percentage, 925 total bases, 57 sacrifice hits, 17 sacrifice flies and 11 intentional walks.

Jackson's best year at the plate came in his "rookie" season of 1966. Although he had played at the major league level for parts of three seasons before, Jackson qualified as a rookie in 1966. He had a .292 batting average and three home runs in 596 trips to the plate. The same year he stole 49 bases, which tied the then-MLB rookie single-season record set by Rollie Zeider in 1910. (Note: Broken by Gene Richards with 56 in 1977)

After his playing days, Jackson continued to be active in baseball. He was a coach and manager for several minor league teams in the Atlanta Braves and San Francisco Giants organization and a coach with the Giants major league team.

== See also ==
- Houston Astros award winners and league leaders
