= 1965 Houston Astros season =

Fourth season for the Major League Baseball team in Houston, and first as the Astros

1965 Houston Astros
- League: National League
- Ballpark: Harris County Domed Stadium
- City: Houston, Texas
- Record: 65–97 (.401)
- League place: 9th
- Owners: Roy Hofheinz
- General managers: Paul Richards
- Managers: Lum Harris
- Television: KTRK-TV
- Radio: KPRC (AM) (Gene Elston, Loel Passe, Harry Kalas)

The 1965 Houston Astros season was the fourth season for the Major League Baseball (MLB) franchise located in Houston, Texas, a member of the National League (NL). Now rebranded as the Astros and having relocated to The Astrodome, the club were known for their first three season as the Colt .45s and were based at Colt Stadium. (Note: The team remained at The Astrodome through the 1999 season.) The Astros entered the 1965 season with a 66–96 record, having finished the previous year in ninth place and 27 games behind the NL pennant and World Series-winning St. Louis Cardinals.

The 1965 season was the first and only full season for Lum Harris as manager, the second in franchise history, having replaced Harry Craft late during the previous year. On April 12, Bob Bruce made the Astros' Opening Day starter, who hosted the Philadelphia Phillies, but were defeated, 2–0.

In the first-ever MLB amateur draft, the Astros' first round selection was shortstop Alex Barrett at fourth overall. Rookie second baseman Joe Morgan established club records on July 8 with six hits—tying the major league record—and 13 total bases for a single game, during a 9–8 defeat to the Milwaukee Braves over 12 innings. Pitcher Turk Farrell represented the Astros at the MLB All-Star Game, his fifth career selection.

The Astros concluded the season with a record of 65–97, a third consecutive in ninth place and 32 games behind the NL pennant and eventual World Series-champion Los Angeles Dodgers. The 97 losses represented a franchise-worst record for Houston at the time, which was one more than the 96 losses the club had for each of their first three seasons of existence. It later matched by the 1975 and 1991 teams, and exceeded in 2011 with 106 losses.

Following the season, Morgan was chosen as The Sporting News NL Rookie Player of the Year (Note: From 1961–2003, The Sporting News declared one rookie position player and pitcher from each league, the NL and the American League (AL), for this award. Starting in 2004, this system was modified to selecting one rookie from each league for the award, regardless of position.)—the first Astro be so recognized—and for the Topps All-Star Rookie Team. Hence, Morgan also became the first Astro to be recognized for a full-season award not specific to one position.

== Offseason ==
=== Summary ===
The Houston Colt .45s concluded the 1964 campaign with a 66–96 (.407) record, ranking ninth in the National League (NL), 27 games behind the NL pennant and World Series-winning St. Louis Cardinals. On September 27, 1964, the Colts hosted the Los Angeles Dodgers for the final contest at Colt Stadium, winning 1–0 on a walk-off single by Jimmy Wynn during the bottom of the 12th inning.

On December 1, the Houston club changed its nickname from Colt .45s to Astros. The move resulted from objections by the Colt Firearms Company to the club's sales of novelties bearing the old nickname. Despite the trademark issues, the "Astros" nickname matched the futuristic ambiance of the revolutionary domed stadium. The nickname was also appropriate since Houston was, by then, the home of NASA's astronaut program. The scoreboard retained subliminal references to the old nickname, as it featured electronically animated cowboys firing pistols, with the "bullets" ricocheting around the scoreboard, when an Astros player would hit a home run. Early on, the groundskeepers also wore astronaut spacesuits to promote that futuristic image.

=== Development and commissioning of the Astrodome ===
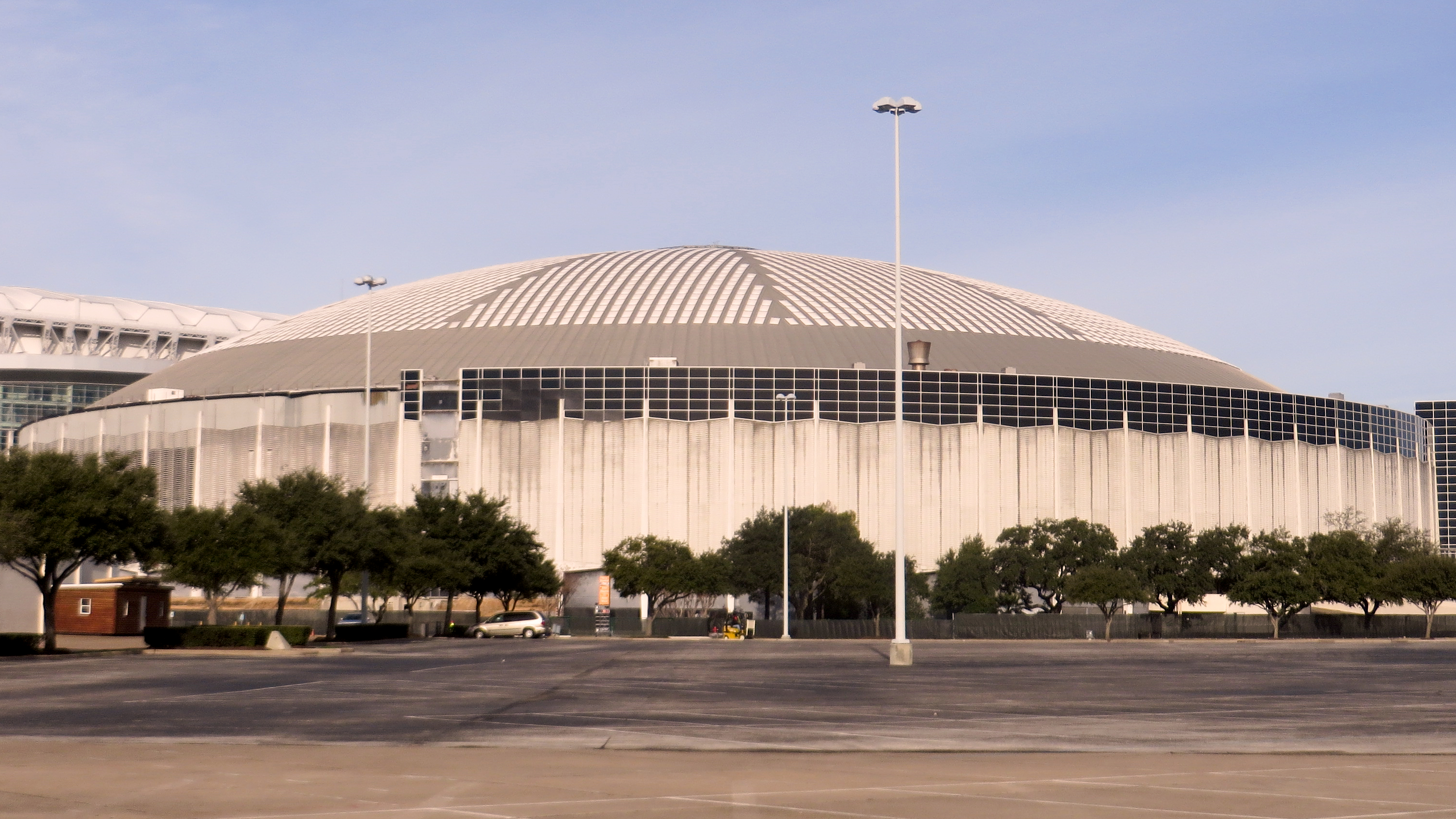
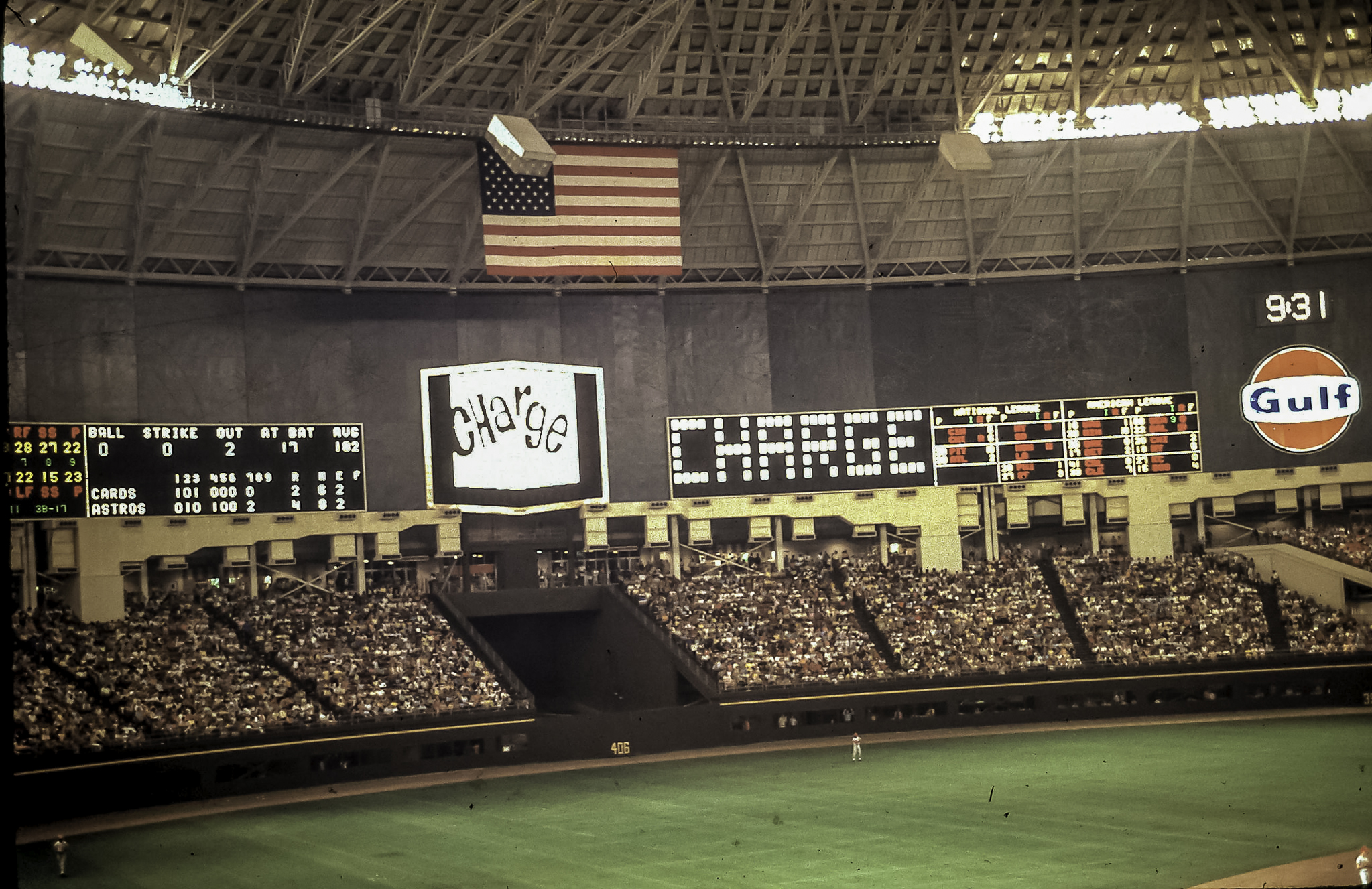
Exterior view of the Astrodome (left) and scoreboard in 1969 (right).

The venue was designed as a defense against the oppressive heat and humidity of the Houston summer. Loosely based on the classic Roman Colosseum, the Astrodome was dubbed the Eighth Wonder of the World. As with many stadiums of that era, such as RFK Stadium and Shea Stadium, the Astrodome was a multi-purpose stadium, designed for both football as well as baseball.

Besides its roof, the Astrodome was revolutionary for a number of other reasons, accentuated by accoutrements not prior-featured or rarely seen at sports facilities. Every seat in the venue was theatre-style, the first stadium so configured. Additionally, it was one of the first stadiums allocated with luxury seats and club seating, at the time a relatively new concept in sports venues. It also had an "exploding scoreboard", which would show various animations after a home run or a win, as well as messages and advertising.

==== Inaugural exhibition game at the Astrodome ====
On April 9, the former Houston Colt .45s took the field and officially became the Houston Astros. They inaugurated indoor baseball in the Astrodome with a 2–1 exhibition win over the New York Yankees. President Lyndon B. Johnson, one of 47,876 total guests in attendance, became the seventh U.S. president to have attended the inaugural game for a stadium. Texas governor John Connally, flanked by National League president Warren Giles and Tamaulipas governor Praxedis Balboa, tossed the ceremonial first pitch.

The Astros' Turk Farrell threw the game's official first pitch and baseball indoors was underway. Hall of Famer Mickey Mantle recorded each of the stadium's first hit, home run, and run scored. During the third inning, catcher Ron Brand smoked a triple for the home team's first hit in their new stadium. Player-coach Nellie Fox, another future Hall of Famer, furnished the first walk-off hit at the Astrodome to settle the contest outright in the bottom of the 12th inning.

=== Notable transactions ===
- January 31, 1965: Bob Watson was signed as an amateur free agent by the Astros.

== Regular season ==
=== Summary ===
==== Opening Day ====
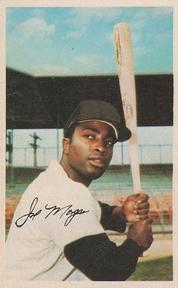
Joe Morgan with Houston, c. 1969, set a number of club records in 1965.

Inaugural game at the Astrodome
Uniform	Player	Position
15	Bob Lillis	Shortstop
18	Joe Morgan	Second baseman
24	Jimmy Wynn	Center fielder
23	Walt Bond	First baseman
14	Bob Aspromonte	Third baseman
20	Jim Beauchamp	Left fielder
28	Joe Gaines	Right fielder
7	John Bateman	Catcher
30	Bob Bruce	Pitcher
Final: Philadelphia 2, Houston 0 • Win: Short • Loss: Bruce; Attendance: 48,546 Sources:

During a pre-game ceremony on Opening Day and at the regular-season opening ceremony of the Astrodome, April 12, 1965, the Astros officially retired jersey number 32 in honor of former Colt .45s pitcher Jim Umbricht. Umbricht had died on April 8, 1964, following a battle with cancer and having returned to play for Houston the season earlier, in 1963. Aged 33 years old, his jersey number was the first to be retired by the team.

The Astrodome hosted a standing-room-only attendance of 48,546. Distinguished guests included Commissioner Ford Frick, National League President Warren Giles (also at the first exhibition game), and a contingent of NASA personnel, who witnessed baseball's tribute to the Space Age through the Astrodome. There, the Houston Astros hosted the Philadelphia Phillies. Twenty-two of the 24 NASA astronauts were in attendance, and, for the ceremonial first pitch, each simultaneously tossed to one of 22 members of the Astros.

The Philadelphia Phillies won the Astrodome’s regular-season opener, 2–0, behind a shutout by starter Chris Short. He held the Houston Astros to four hits and recorded 11 strikeouts, finishing with a game score of 88. Tony Taylor hit a leadoff double for the first regular-season hit in an indoor Major League game. For Houston, Bob Bruce pitched seven innings and allowed two runs. In the third inning, Dick Allen hit a two-run home run to give Philadelphia the lead, while Joe Morgan recorded Houston’s first regular-season hit in the fourth.

==== Rest of April ====
On April 15, Jimmy Wynn became involved in two first-time batting events for the Astros as they faced the New York Mets at Shea Stadium. During the bottom of the second inning, Walt Bond and Bob Aspromonte each started with a single, and Bond advanced to third on Aspromonte's hit. Next, Wynn flied out to right fielder Johnny Lewis, who threw out Bond racing home, and catcher Chris Cannizzaro fired to shortstop Roy McMillan, who tagged out Aspromonte and convert the triple play. This was both the first triple play turned against Houston. and first in which they were involved. (Note: The Astros turned their first triple play on July 16, 1971, which was also against New York.) During the top of the ninth, Wynn drilled the first home run for Houston known as the Astros, a two-run game-tying blast in the top of the ninth off Jack Fisher. However, in the bottom of the tenth inning, Bobby Klaus cranked a Claude Raymond offering for a walk-off home run deep to left field and decide a 5–4 the Mets victory.

Rusty Staub christened the first regular-season walk-off safety at the Astrodome on April 23, singling home Al Spangler in the bottom of the twelfth inning, icing a 4–3 decision over the Pittsburgh Pirates. Dave Giusti plugged the final two frames in relief to secure the victory. Bruce, the Astros starter, logged his first double of the season during the third off his mound opponent, Bob Veale (the National League's reigning strikeout leader), to score John Bateman. Bruce surrendered two runs over 7 1/3 innings pitched.

Bob Aspromonte blasted the home team's first home run at the Astrodome on April 24 during the bottom of the sixth off Vern Law of the Pirates. The next inning, Wynn also took Law deep. As a result, a home run event by the home team cued "The Home Spectacular," an animated visual graphics display that quantified 474 feet (144 m) on the center field wall.

==== May ====
On May 1, the Astros swept a doubleheader of the Chicago Cubs, extending a winning streak to ten games for a club record. Though Houston would tie this record over a number of occasions, it remained the record until 1999.

Two prominent Astros obtained milestone firsts on May 8 at Wrigley Field. Joe Morgan connected for his first major league home run to deep right field. The blast occurred in the top of the sixth inning off Lindy McDaniel of Chicago, extending the Astros' lead to 8–5. Meanwhile, right-hander Larry Dierker procured his first Major League victory through finishing off the final 4 1/3 innings (Note: Larry Dierker, for single games, from 1964 to 1965, in the regular season, in career game No. 50 or less, requiring batters faced ≥ 1, sorted by ascending date.) of relief of Don Nottebart. Seven of the Astros starting nine collected multi-hit games as Rusty Staub and Jimmy Wynn also went deep for an 11–6 Houston triumph. Wynn doubled and led the Astros with 3 RBI.

For the first time, on May 22, ABC's broadcast of the Major League Baseball Game of the Week featured the Astrodome. Viewers were thrilled by a massive Willie Mays home run that propelled the San Francisco Giants over the Astros to win the contest, 10–1. On May 23, the Giants, able to leverage a three-run, inside-the-park home run—a result of the ball getting caught in the roof of the Astrodome—won, 5–2, over Houston. This was the final game as a Houston Astro for starter Ken Johnson, who received news after the contest that had been traded to the Milwaukee Braves for outfielder Lee Maye.

Due to pop flies routinely misjudged as induced by the glare through the roof of the Astrodone, clear glass panes costing about $20,000 were installed on May 24. Consequently, these conditions created inadequate lighting to sustain the grass, which led to the installation of AstroTurf the following season.

Bpb Bruce struck out a then-club record 13 on May 26, tying Turk Farrell's effort on May 10, 1963. (Note: For single games, from 1962 to 1966, playing for HOU, in the regular season, sorted by descending strikeouts.) Bruce surrendered five hits and three runs in a complete game as the Astros triumphed over the Cincinnati Reds, 8–3. Jimmy Wynn homered and tripled, wound up just a double short of hitting for the cycle, and knocked in four runners. This record remained until June 25, 1966, when Mike Cuellar fanned 15.

==== June ====
With the scored tied 2–2 on June 4 going into the ninth inning, Houston Astros catcher Ron Brand connected for a three-run homer into the left field bleachers off Bob Gibson for the decisive runs in an Astros' 5–2 win over the St. Louis Cardinals. After 140 relief appearances, on June 6, Claude Raymond made the first of seven starts over his major league career. He tossed a complete game against the Cardinals. holding them to just seven hits and one run as the Houston won, 10–1.

From June 8 to 9, the inaugural MLB amateur entry draft was conducted in New York City. The Astros received the fourth overall pick and chose shortstop Alex Barrett from Atwater High School in Atwater, California. Barrett played seven seasons professionally through 1971, reaching as high as Triple-A with the Oklahoma City 89ers, first in 1968. English native Keith Lampard, an outfielder at the University of Oregon whom the Astros chose as their second pick, would become their earliest draft pick to reach the major leagues. Lampard debuted with the Astros on September 15, 1969. Danny Walton, selected in the tenth round, was the position player among this year's draft class for Houston who would appear in the most games in the major leagues (297), while right-hander Tom Murphy, selected in the 18th round, would pitch the most games (439). Murphy did not sign with Houston. Eleven of the 71 players chosen by the Astros this year reached the major leagues.

The Astros passed the one-million mark in attendance for the first time on June 25, surpassing the prior year's total in under half a season. Eighteen-year-old Larry Dierker outdueled an ageless Warren Spahn—a quarter-century Dierker's senior—to lead the Astros to a 6–1 triumph over New York. Joe Morgan ignited the scoring with a two-run triple.

==== Joe Morgan's six-hit game ====
On July 8, rookie second baseman Joe Morgan established clubs records with six hits and 13 total bases, including two home runs, and also collected three RBI and four runs scored at Milwaukee County Stadium. The six hits tied the major league record for one game. His feats carried through Astros through an eventual 12-inning, 9–8 loss to the Milwaukee Braves. (Note: On May 7, 2018, George Springer tied the club record with six hits one game.) (Note: Three other players had since connected for 13 total bases in one game: Lee May in 1974, Jeff Bagwell on June 24, 1994, and Morgan Ensberg in 2005.) This was the first multi-home run game of Morgan's career, with both drives courtesty of Tony Cloninger offerings.

==== Early July ====
Morgan scored his second career multi-home run game just two days after his record performance. On July 10, took Galen Cisco deep in the top of the fourth inning at Shea Stadium, and in the top of the ninth, Tug McGraw. His performance was instrumental in a 9–1 clobbering of the New York Mets.

==== MLB All-Star Game ====
Turk Farrell made the MLB All-Star Game, hosted at Metropolitan Stadium. His fourth selection as an Astro, this extended his own club record. Outfielder César Cedeño was chosen to four All-Star Game to match Farrell for the club record in the 1976 edition. (Note: As Major League Baseball held two All-Star Games each year from 1959 to 1962, Cedeño distinguished himself as the first Astro to make the All-Star team in four different seasons.) This stood as club record until Craig Biggio would receive his fifth selection in the 1996 All-Star Game

==== Later July—August ====
On July 25, Nellie Fox made his final major league appearance as a player, against the Cincinnati Reds, having ceded the starting second base job to fellow future Hall-of-Famer Joe Morgan. Fox had appeared in 21 games for Houston, batting .268. Fox remained on-field in his coaching role for the Astros for the remainder of the season and two more afterward.

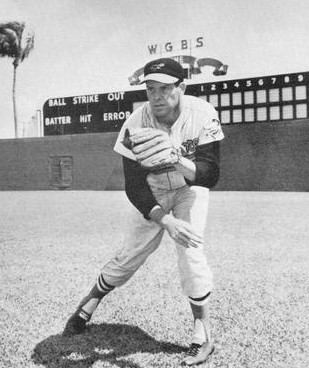
Pitcher Robin Roberts, shown during his tenure with the Baltimore Orioles.

During a span of eight outings initiated July 26, right-hander Dave Giusti retired 27 consecutive batters faced until August 14 to establish a club record. It remained as the club record 44 years until 2019 when surpassed by starting pitcher Justin Verlander, who accumulated 32. In 2022, Ryan Pressly also reached 32, which usurped Giusti for the club record for relief pitchers.

Veteran right-hander Robin Roberts made his Houston Astros debut at home on August 9, tossing a four-hit shutout while leading an 8–0 whitewashing of his former club, the Philadelphia Phillies. The victory was the 277th of Roberts' career.

On August 16, Roberts hurled his second successive four-hit shutout, this time of the Phillies' rival, the Pittsburgh Pirates. The Astros triumphed, 3 to 0. Roberts issued two base on balls while whiffing seven.

Roberts tossed another complete game in catenation on August 21, leading a 9–2 triumph over the Cubs. Roberts diffused nine hits and three walks while being charged with both runs as earned.

==== September ====
Hosting the Giants on September 13 at the Astrodome, Willie Mays crushed his 500th home run, and 47th of the season. Mays golfed a Don Nottebart offering deep to centerfield leading off the top of the fourth inning, depicted by Bob Stevens of the San Francisco Chronicle as a “monstrous, 440-foot blast into the centerfield bleachers.” At the time, the only hitters Mays had trailed were Babe Ruth (714), Jimmie Foxx (534), Ted Williams (521), and Mel Ott (511). The Giants scored three more times in the fourth, and behind a complete game effort from Juan Marichal, cruised, 5–1. Houston's only tally arrived via Jimmy Wynn's 21st home run in the bottom of the first inning.

On September 26, Chuck Harrison belted a walk-off home run—also his first major league home run—to cap a 4–2 victory over the Cincinnati Reds. Harrison took Billy McCool deep, and the drive scored Lee Maye and Jimmy Wynn.

==== Performance overview ====
The Astros concluded the 1965 epoch with a 65–97 (.401) record, in ninth place of ten National League clubs, and 32 games behind the pennant-winning Los Angeles Dodgers. In their first year at the Astrodome, Houston smashed attendance records with 2,151,470, nearly tripling the showing of fans from the year prior, for the second-highest total in the National League. (Note: This would remain the Astros' highest attendance-placing in the league throughout all their years as tenants of the Astrodome. The club would next reach a ranking as high as second place in 2021, as tenants of Minute Maid Park, doing so for the first of four successive campaigns.) This was the premier campaign in which the Colt .45s/Astros franchise had claimed both of the one-million and two-million thresholds of attendees. The team next reached the 2-million barrier in 1980, during which they claimed their first-ever playoff qualification.

However, the 97 defeats transformed into the franchise-worst record for Houston at the time, which surmounted the 96 losses the club had tallied in each of their first three seasons of existence. The 1975 and 1991 squads later equaled this record and, in 2011, the team overran the record with 106 losses. The 1965 iteration was the fourth of Houston's first seven campaigns in which they lost 90 or more contests, a franchise record.

Houston totaled 25 home runs at the Astrodome during their first year in their new stadium, compared with 72 on the road.

Morgan set club marks for at-bats (601), runs (100), hits (163) and triples (12) over a season. His 14 home runs established the club rookie record. (Note: Eclipsed by Glenn Davis in 1985.) Morgan also became the first Houston Astro to be selected as the NL Rookie Player of the Year by The Sporting News (TSN).

Meanwhile, Jim Wynn became Houston's first 40-stolen base bandit with 43, retaining the club record until Sonny Jackson pilfered 49 the following year. (Note: For single seasons, playing for HOU, in the regular season, requiring stolen bases ≥ 40, sorted by ascending season.)

=== League standings ===
National League
Team	W	L	Pct.	GB	Home	Road
Los Angeles Dodgers	97	65	.599	—	50‍–‍31	47‍–‍34
San Francisco Giants	95	67	.586	2	51‍–‍30	44‍–‍37
Pittsburgh Pirates	90	72	.556	7	49‍–‍32	41‍–‍40
Cincinnati Reds	89	73	.549	8	49‍–‍32	40‍–‍41
Milwaukee Braves	86	76	.531	11	44‍–‍37	42‍–‍39
Philadelphia Phillies	85	76	.528	11½	45‍–‍35	40‍–‍41
St. Louis Cardinals	80	81	.497	16½	42‍–‍39	38‍–‍42
Chicago Cubs	72	90	.444	25	40‍–‍41	32‍–‍49
Houston Astros	65	97	.401	32	36‍–‍45	29‍–‍52
New York Mets	50	112	.309	47	29‍–‍52	21‍–‍60

=== Record versus opponents ===
National League

1965 National League record Sources:
Team	CHC	CIN	HOU	LAD	MIL	NYM	PHI	PIT	SF	STL
Chicago	—	7–11	8–10	8–10	9–9	11–7–1	8–10	5–13	6–12	10–8–1
Cincinnati	11–7	—	12–6	6–12	12–6	11–7	13–5	8–10	6–12	10–8
Houston	10–8	6–12	—	5–13	4–14	14–4	6–12	8–10	3–15	9–9
Los Angeles	10–8	12–6	13–5	—	10–8	12–6	9–9	9–9	10–8	12–6
Milwaukee	9–9	6–12	14–4	8–10	—	13–5	6–12	9–9	10–8	11–7
New York	7–11–1	7–11	4–14	6–12	5–13	—	7–11–1	4–14	5–13	5–13
Philadelphia	10–8	5–13	12–6	9–9	12–6	11–7–1	—	8–10	8–10	10–7
Pittsburgh	13–5	10–8	10–8	9–9	9–9	14–4	10–8	—	11–7–1	4–14
San Francisco	12–6	12–6	15–3	8–10	8–10	13–5	10–8	7–11–1	—	10–8
St. Louis	8–10–1	8–10	9–9	6–12	7–11	13–5	7–10	14–4	8–10	—

=== Notable transactions ===
- April 24, 1965: Don Larsen was traded by the Astros to the Baltimore Orioles for Bob Saverine and cash.
- May 23, 1965: Ken Johnson and Jim Beauchamp were traded by the Astros to the Milwaukee Braves for Lee Maye.
- June 14, 1965: Gus Triandos was purchased by the Astros from the Philadelphia Phillies.
- July 10, 1965: Frank Thomas was purchased by the Astros from the Philadelphia Phillies.
- August 20, 1965: Gus Triandos was released by the Astros.
- September 1, 1965: Frank Thomas was traded by the Astros to the Milwaukee Braves for a player to be named later. The Braves completed the deal by sending Mickey Sinnerud (minors) to the Astros on September 11.

=== Roster ===
1965 Houston Astros
Roster
Pitchers: 46 Don Arlich; 30 Bob Bruce; 44 Danny Coombs; 35 Mike Cuellar; 49 Larry Dierker; 13 Turk Farrell; 39 Dave Giusti; 40 Ken Johnson; 34 Gordon Jones; 31 Jack Lamabe; 31 Don Larsen; 40,48 Don Lee; 34 Ken MacKenzie; 43 Don Nottebart; 33 Jim Owens; 21 Jim Ray; 36 Claude Raymond; 38 Robin Roberts; 41 Carroll Sembera; 40,46 Ron Taylor; 42 Bruce Von Hoff; 46 Hal Woodeshick; 37 Chris Zachary	Catchers: 8 Dave Adlesh; 7 John Bateman; 9 Ron Brand; 9 John Hoffman; 7 Gus Triandos; Infielders: 14 Bob Aspromonte; 23 Walt Bond; 2 Nellie Fox; 52,4 Jim Gentile; 35 Chuck Harrison; 19 Sonny Jackson; 11 Eddie Kasko; 15 Bob Lillis; 25 Jim Mahoney; 18 Joe Morgan; 31 Frank Thomas; 16 Mike White	Outfielders: 20 Jim Beauchamp; 28 Joe Gaines; 20 Lee Maye; 34 Norm Miller; 21 Al Spangler; 10 Rusty Staub; 24 Jimmy Wynn; Other batters: 27 Gene Ratliff	Manager: 26 Lum Harris; Coaches: 3 Jimmy Adair; 4,41 Jim Busby (Third base); 6 Clint Courtney; 2 Nellie Fox; 5 Howie Pollet

== Player stats ==
=== Batting ===
==== Starters by position ====
Note: Pos = Position; G = Games played; AB = At bats; R = Runs scored; H = Hits; 2B = Doubles; 3B = Triples; Avg. = Batting average; HR = Home runs; RBI = Runs batted in; SB = Stolen bases
Positional abbreviations: C = Catcher; 1B = First base; 2B = Second base; 3B = Third base; SS = Shortstop; LF = Left field; CF = Center field; RF = Right field

Pos	Player	G	AB	R	H	2B	3B	Avg.	HR	RBI	SB
C	Ron Brand	117	391	27	92	6	3	.235	2	37	10
1B	Walt Bond	117	407	46	107	17	2	.263	7	47	2
2B	Joe Morgan	157	601	100	163	22	12	.271	14	40	20
3B	Bob Aspromonte	152	578	53	152	15	2	.263	5	52	2
SS	Bob Lillis	124	408	34	90	12	1	.221	1	38	2
LF	Lee Maye	108	415	38	104	17	7	.251	3	36	1
CF	Jim Wynn	157	564	90	155	30	7	.275	22	73	43
RF	Rusty Staub	131	410	43	105	20	1	.256	14	63	3

==== Other batters ====
Note: G = Games played; AB = At bats; R = Runs scored; H = Hits; 2B = Doubles; 3B = Triples; Avg. = Batting average; HR = Home runs; RBI = Runs batted in; SB = Stolen bases

Player	G	AB	R	H	2B	3B	Avg.	HR	RBI	SB
Joe Gaines	100	229	21	52	8	1	.227	6	31	4
Jim Gentile	81	227	22	55	11	1	.242	7	31	0
Eddie Kasko	68	215	18	53	7	1	.247	1	10	1
John Bateman	45	142	15	28	3	1	.197	7	14	4
Al Spangler	38	112	18	24	1	1	.214	1	7	1
Gus Triandos	24	72	5	13	2	0	.181	2	7	0
Frank Thomas	23	58	7	10	2	0	.172	3	9	0
Jim Beauchamp	24	53	5	10	1	0	.189	0	4	0
Chuck Harrison	15	45	2	9	4	0	.200	1	9	0
Nellie Fox	21	41	3	11	2	0	.268	0	1	0
Dave Adlesh	15	34	2	5	1	0	.147	0	3	0
Sonny Jackson	10	23	1	3	0	0	.130	0	0	1
Norm Miller	11	15	2	3	0	1	.200	0	1	0
Mike White	8	9	0	0	0	0	.000	0	0	0
John Hoffman	2	6	1	2	0	0	.333	0	1	0
Jim Mahoney	5	5	0	1	0	0	.200	0	0	0
Gene Ratliff	4	4	0	0	0	0	.000	0	0	0

=== Pitching ===
==== Starting pitchers ====
Note: G = Games pitched; GS = Games started; IP = Innings pitched; W = Wins; L = Losses; ERA = Earned run average; R = Runs allowed; ER = Earned runs allowed; BB = Walks allowed; K = Strikeouts

Player	G	GS	IP	W	L	ERA	R	ER	BB	K
Bob Bruce	35	34	229.2	9	18	3.72	107	95	38	145
Turk Farrell	33	29	208.1	11	11	3.50	94	81	35	122
Don Nottebart	29	25	158.0	4	15	4.67	99	82	55	77
Larry Dierker	26	19	146.2	7	8	3.50	69	57	37	109
Robin Roberts	10	10	76.0	5	2	1.89	22	16	10	34
Ken Johnson	8	8	51.2	3	2	4.18	25	24	11	28
Don Arlich	1	1	6.0	0	0	3.00	2	2	1	0
Don Larsen	1	1	5.1	0	0	5.06	3	3	3	1

==== Other pitchers ====
Note: G = Games pitched; GS = Games started; IP = Innings pitched; W = Wins; L = Losses; SV = Saves; ERA = Earned run average; R = Runs allowed; ER = Earned runs allowed; BB = Walks allowed; K = Strikeouts

Player	G	GS	IP	W	L	SV	ERA	R	ER	BB	K
Dave Giusti	38	13	131.1	8	7	3	4.32	67	63	46	92
Claude Raymond	33	7	96.1	7	4	5	2.90	35	31	16	79
Jack Lamabe	3	2	12.2	0	2	0	4.26	9	6	3	6
Chris Zachary	4	2	10.2	0	2	0	4.22	6	5	6	4
Jim Ray	3	2	7.2	0	2	0	10.57	9	9	6	7
Carroll Sembera	2	1	7.1	0	1	0	3.68	3	3	3	4

==== Relief pitchers ====
Note: G = Games pitched; IP = Innings pitched; W = Wins; L = Losses; SV = Saves; ERA = Earned run average; R = Runs allowed; ER = Earned runs allowed; BB = Walks allowed; K = Strikeouts

Player	G	IP	W	L	SV	ERA	R	ER	BB	K
Jim Owens	50	71.1	6	5	8	3.28	28	26	29	53
Ron Taylor	32	57.2	1	5	4	6.40	42	41	16	37
Mike Cuellar	25	56.0	1	4	2	3.54	24	22	21	46
Danny Coombs	26	47.0	0	2	0	4.79	26	25	23	35
Ken MacKenzie	21	37.0	0	3	0	3.89	22	16	6	26
Hal Woodeshick	27	32.1	3	4	3	3.06	13	11	18	22
Don Lee	7	8.0	0	0	0	3.38	3	3	3	3
Bruce Von Hoff	3	3.0	0	0	0	9.00	3	3	2	1
Gordon Jones	1	1.0	0	0	0	0.00	0	0	0	0

== Major League Baseball draft ==
Houston Astros 1965 MLB draft selections
Rd.	Slot	Draftee	Position	School	Origin	Signed	Notes	Bio
1	4	Alex Barrett	Shortstop	Atwater High	(California)	Y		
2	24	Keith Lampard	Outfielder	Oregon	(United Kingdom)	Y	(Note: MLB debut on September 15, 1969, for Houston)	
3	44	James Monin	Shortstop	Kentucky	(Kentucky)	Y		
4	76	Pat Jacquez	Right-handed pitcher	Amos Alonzo Stagg	(California)	N	(Note: Signed with the Chicago Cubs from the January secondary phase draft in 1967.) (Note: MLB debut on April 18, 1971, for the Chicago White Sox)	
5	96	Billy Martin	Outfielder	Colonial Heights	(Virginia)	N	(Note: Signed with the Washington Senators from the 1967 draft.)	
6	116	David Fyfe	Right-handed pitcher	Hillsborough High	(Florida)	Y		
7	136	Ken Chelini	Left-handed pitcher	Gailileo High	(California)	Y		
8	142	Daniel Rudanovich	Outfielder	Missouri	(Missouri)	N	(Note: Signed with the Boston Red Sox from the January 1966 secondary phase draft.)	
9	184	Larry Hall	Outfielder	Centreville High	(Maryland)	N		
10	192	Danny Walton	Outfielder	Bishop Amat Memorial	(California)	Y	(Note: MLB debut on April 20, 1968, for Houston)	
11	202	Gary Gentry	Right-handed pitcher	Phoenix	(Arizona)	N	(Note: Signed with the New York Mets from the June 1967 secondary phase draft.) (Note: MLB debut on April 10, 1969, for New York)	
18	364	Tom Murphy	Right-handed pitcher	Ohio	(Ohio)	N	(Note: Signed with the California Angels from the January 1967 secondary phase draft.) (Note: MLB debut on June 13, 1968, for California)	
25	484	Buzz Stephen	Right-handed pitcher	Fresno	(California)	N	(Note: Signed with the Minnesota Twins from the June 1966 secondary phase draft.) (Note: MLB debut on September 20, 1968, for Minnesota)	
36	665	Jerry DaVanon	Outfielder	San Diego Mesa	(California)	N	(Note: Signed with the St. Louis Cardinals from the June 1966 secondary phase draft.) (Note: MLB debut on April 11, 1969, for the San Diego Padres)	
46	738	Mel Behney	Left-handed pitcher	Verona High	(New Jersey)	N	(Note: Signed with the Cincinnati Reds from the June 1968 draft.) (Note: MLB debut on April 11, 1970, for Cincinnati)	
56	781	Rich Nye	Left-handed pitcher	California	(California)	N	(Note: Signed with the Chicago Cubs from the June 1966 draft.) (Note: MLB debut on September 16, 1966, for Chicago)	
62	803	Billy Harris	Shortstop	UNC Wilmington	(North Carolina)	N	(Note: Signed with the Cleveland Indians from the June 1966 draft.) (Note: MLB debut on June 16, 1968, with Cleveland)	
68	816	Otis Thornton	Catcher	Westfield HS	(Alabama)	Y	(Note: MLB debut on July 6, 1973, with Houston)	

== Awards and honors ==
=== Career honors ===
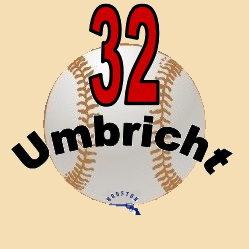
Jim Umbricht's number 32 was retired by the Houston Astros in 1965.

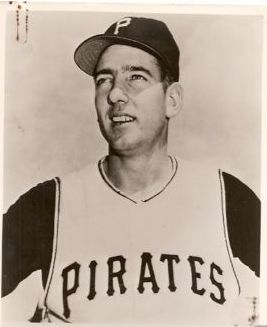
Major league pitcher Jim Umbricht

Career honors received in 1965
Honor / mention received	Individual	Role	Uni.	Start	Finish	ASG	Bio. / Games	Summ.
Houston Astros uniform numbers retired	Jim Umbricht	Pitcher	32	1962	1963	—	69 games	
Ref.:

=== Annual awards ===
1965 Houston Astros award winners
Name of award		Recipient	Ref.
Houston Astros Most Valuable Player Award (MVP)		Jimmy Wynn	
MLB All-Star Game	Reserve pitcher	Turk Farrell	
The Sporting News NL Rookie Player of the Year		Joe Morgan	
Topps All-Star Rookie Team	Second baseman	Joe Morgan	

Other awards results

Name of award	Voting recipient(s) (Team)	Ref.
NL Most Valuable Player	1st—Mays (SFG) • 31st—Morgan (HOU)	
NL Rookie of the Year	1st—Lefebvre (LAD) • 2nd—Morgan (HOU)	

=== League leaders ===
NL batting leaders

- Bases on balls: Joe Morgan (97—led MLB)

=== Other ===
1965 grand slams
No.	Date	Astros batter	Venue	Inning	Pitcher	Opposing team	Box
None

== Minor league system ==
Level	Team	League	Manager
AAA	Oklahoma City 89ers	Pacific Coast League	Grady Hatton
AA	Amarillo Sonics	Texas League	Lou Fitzgerald
A	Durham Bulls	Carolina League	Dave Philley
A	Cocoa Astros	Florida State League	Billy Goodman
A	Salisbury Astros	Western Carolinas League	Chuck Churn
Rookie	FRL Astros	Florida Rookie League	Joe Frazier

Championships

- Pacific Coast League champions: Oklahoma City
- Florida Rookie League champions: FRL Astros

Awards

- Pacific Coast League Most Valuable Player (PCL MVP): Dave Roberts, OF
- Texas League Most Valuable Player (TL MVP): Leo Posada, OF
- Topps Minor League Player of the Year: Dave Roberts, OF

== See also ==
- List of Major League Baseball retired numbers
- List of Major League Baseball single-game hits leaders
