= 1964 Houston Colt .45s season =

Third season in Major League Baseball for Houston, and final as the Colt .45s

1964 Houston Colt .45s
- League: National League
- Ballpark: Colt Stadium
- City: Houston, Texas
- Record: 66–96 (.407)
- League place: 9th
- Owners: Roy Hofheinz
- General managers: Paul Richards
- Managers: Harry Craft, Lum Harris
- Television: KTRK-TV
- Radio: KPRC (AM) (Gene Elston, Loel Passe)

The 1964 Houston Colt .45s season was the third season for the Major League Baseball (MLB) franchise located in Houston, Texas, a member of the National League (NL) based at Colt Stadium, The Colt .45s entered the season with a 66–96 record, in ninth place and 33 games behind the NL pennant and World Series-winning Los Angeles Dodgers.

The Colt .45s commenced their season on April 13, hosted by the Cincinnati Reds at Crosley Field, where Ken Johnson made the Opening Day start for the Astros, who won, 6–3. On April 19, right-hander Bob Bruce delivered the first-ever immaculate inning for Houston.

Ten days after the season started, on April 23, Ken Johnson hurled the second no-hitter in franchise history. However, he became the first pitcher in major league history to lose a complete game no-hitter in nine innings, a 1–0 defeat to Cincinnati.

Pitcher Turk Farrell represented the Colt .45s for the MLB All-Star Game, his fourth career selection.

Manager Harry Craft was terminated on September 19 and replaced by bench coach Lum Harris. The final game at Colt Stadium was hosted on September 27, a 1–0, 12-inning victory over Los Angeles. Jimmy Wynn delivered the final, walk-off hit, while starter Bob Bruce earned the victory via a complete game shutout.

The Colt .45s concluded the 1964 season with a 66–96 record, in ninth place and 27 games behind the NL pennant and eventual World Series champion St. Louis Cardinals. This was the final of three seasons in which Houston played as the Colt .45s and at Colt Stadium before being renamed the Astros and relocating to The Astrodome effective the following year.

== Offseason ==
=== Summary ===
The Houston Colt .45s concluded the 1963 campaign with a 66–96 (.407) record, ranking ninth in the National League (NL), 33 games behind the NL pennant and World Series-winning Los Angeles Dodgers.

During the first-ever exhibition game between the Colts and their expansion mates, the New York Mets in Spring Training on March 23, 1964, nineteen-year-old rookie phenom John Paciorek swatted a bases-loaded triple during the first inning. Paciorek had made a triumphant major league debut during the previous year's regular-season finale, going three-for-three with two base on balls. However, due to back injuries, he would be rendered unable to participate in another regular-season major league contest.

On April 8, just days before Opening Day, Colt .45s pitcher Jim Umbricht died of cancer at age 33. Umbricht had returned after diagnosis and treatment in 1963 to pitch in 35 games, but relapse occurred during the offseason. The team officially retired his jersey number 32 the following Opening Day, on April 12, 1965, during a pre-game ceremony and the regular-season opening ceremony of the Astrodome. His jersey number was the first to be retired by the team.

=== Notable transactions ===
- October 10, 1963: Claude Raymond was drafted by the Colt .45s from the Milwaukee Braves in a 1963 special draft.

== Regular season ==
=== Summary ===
==== April ====
1963 Sportservice image of catcher John Bateman

Opening Day starting lineup
Uniform	Player	Position
11	Eddie Kasko	Shortstop
2	Nellie Fox	Second baseman
3	Pete Runnels	First baseman
23	Walt Bond	Left fielder
20	Rusty Staub	Right fielder
24	Jimmy Wynn	Center fielder
14	Bob Aspromonte	Third baseman
7	John Bateman	Catcher
40	Ken Johnson	Pitcher
Venue: Crosley Field • Houston 6, Cincinnat 3 Sources:

The Colt .45s triumphed over the Cincinnati Reds at Crosley Field, 6–3, for Opening Day on April 13, to obtain sole possession of first place for the only time during their first three years. In the top of fifth, Nellie Fox's two-run batted in (RBI) single extended Houston's lead, 3–0. and Cincinnati native Jimmy Wynn homered in the sixth inning. President Lyndon B. Johnson, in attendance, looked on as Colts starter Ken Johnson painted a two-hit shutout into the ninth inning, before Bob Skinner launched a two-run blast. Hal Woodeshick recorded the final out for the save.

==== Bob Bruce's immaculate inning ====
During the eighth inning versus the St. Louis Cardinals on April 19, Bob Bruce entered in relief and hurled the first immaculate inning to club history. The right-hander set down Bill White swinging, Charlie James looking, and Ken Boyer swinging. However, the Colts lost to Bob Gibson in a masterful complete game, 6–1. Bruce returned for ninth inning, whom Johnny Lewis greeted with a single to center field and then stole second base. However, Bruce proceeded to strike out the side again, ringing up Tim McCarver, Julián Javier and Gibson.

Bruce struck the immaculate inning just one day after Sandy Koufax hurled the third of his career.

==== Ken Johnson's no-hitter ====
On April 23, Houston starter Ken Johnson became the first pitcher in major league history to lose a complete game no-hitter in nine innings when he was beaten 1–0 by the Cincinnati Reds. Cincinnati's Pete Rose scored the only run of the contest. In the ninth inning, he reached second base via error on Vada Pinson's batted ground ball and later scored.

Prior to Johnson's remarkable—though dubious—accomplishment, nine other mound slingers had lost no-hit games in extra innings.

This magnus opus succeeded Don Nottebart after less than one year on May 17, 1963, in a 4–1 triumph over the Philadelphia Phillies as the second no-hitter in franchise history.

In addition to becoming the only pitcher to lose a no-hitter, Johnson's was just the third in the major leagues to have been thrown by an individual pitcher which also did not result in a shutout. Rather, Joe Nuxhall, Johnson's mound opponent, was credited with the shutout and victory.

Among no-hatters by individual pitchers that were not shutouts, Johnson was preceded first by Bob Feller on July 1, 1951, when he led the Cleveland Indians to a 2–1 triumph over the Detroit Tigers, then by Nottebart's effort. This made the Houston Colt .45s the all-time record-holders as a franchise for no-hitters that were complete games but not shutouts. The next bout of this type was imposed by Dean Chance on August 25, 1967, in a 2–1 Minnesota Twins triumph over the Indians. Moreover, on September 8, 1993, Astros moundsman Darryl Kile stymied the New York Mets, 7–1, in this class of no-hitter to extend the Colt .45s/Astros franchise as the major league leader.

==== June ====
On June 11, Bob Aspromonte smashed a go-ahead grand slam in the bottom of the fifth inning to bring Houston to a 5–2 lead over the Cincinnati Reds. The shot, off Reds starter John Tsitouris (2–4), provided all the support required for winner Claude Raymond (2–1), who tossed 6 1/3 innings in relief of Bob Bruce as Houston held on to win, 5–3. However, all of Houston's runs were scored with a two-out upstart in the fifth and were unearned. Facing a 2–0 deficit, Al Spangler worked a base on balls and Nellie Fox followed with a single. Next, Mike White reached on a third-strike passed ball to load the bases, and first baseman Dave Roberts coaxed the second walk of the frame to force in Houston's first run. Aspromonte then followed with his thunderous blast deep to left. Aspromonte's third career slam, it arrived one year to the day following his 10th inning, walk-off grand slam which defeated the Chicago Cubs.

Ken Boyer of the Cardinals connected for the first—and only—cycle at Colt Stadium on June 16. Bob Bruce yielded the double and triple to Boyer, who smacked the home run off Don Larsen in the top of the seventh. The Colt .45s' only tally for the game arrived via Rusty Staub's home run to right off Curt Simmons in the bottom of the seventh. Houston dropped this contest, 7–1.

In another first for pitcher Ken Johnson, he slugged his first career home run on June 21, during the fifth inning of a doubleheader nightcap. The victim was Denny Lemaster of the Milwaukee Braves. Every run counted as Johnson departed the mound with three runs surrendered over 6 2/3 innings pitched for a 5–3 lead. Joe Gaines also homered for the Colts, a two-run shot in the seventh. During the bottom of the eighth, Gene Oliver scored on a Denis Menke ground ball double play to shortstop, but Hal Woodeshick got out of rest of the inning unscathed and closed out the contest for his 14th save.

Following the doubleheader sweep of the Braves on June 21, the Colts had assembled a four-game winning streak. They played to their best showing on the season to date, 32–34 (.485) and in seventh place in the National League, but stumbled to 34–62 (.354) the rest of the way.

Bob Aspromonte connected for the final grand slam hit at Colt Stadium on June 29, while becoming the first player in club history to hit two grand slams in the same month. (Note: Aspromnonte repeated the multi-grand slams in one month feat next for the Astros in August 1966, which remained the team record until Alex Bregman hit three in June 2023.) Thus far, Aspromonte had hit four of the first seven grand slams in Colts' team history.

==== July ====
On July 4, Joe Gaines cranked the final inside-the-park home run at Colt Stadium.

On July 9, Nellie Fox scorched a bases-loaded single that scored John Bateman and Jerry Grote for his first walk-off hit of the season. This capped a rally off Ron Perranoski during the bottom of the ninth inning to topple the Los Angeles Dodgers, 6–5.

==== September ====
The Colt .45s relieved manager Harry Craft of duty on September 19 and promoted coach Lum Harris to guide the club for the remainder of the season. Craft was Houston's first major league manager as well as the city's final minor league manager, of the Buffaloes. General manager Paul Richards indicated the move was made to allow Craft to pursue other offers for the same position, as two other clubs had interest in his services. Craft had led the club to a 61–88 (.409) record, while the club performed to 5–8 (.385) under Harris for the remaining 13 contests.

Right-hander Larry Dierker made his MLB debut on his 18th birthday on September 22 at Colt Stadium, starting versus the San Francisco Giants. Dierker walked the leadoff batter, Harvey Kuenn, and surrendered a hit to the next hitter, Matty Alou, but retired the next three in order without allowing a run, including retiring Jim Ray Hart for his first career strikeout, and striking out Willie Mays looking to retire the side. However, Orlando Cepeda blasted a home run off Dierker leading off the second. He aggregated 2 2/3 innings pitched, surrendered four total runs with two earned, five hits, three bases on balls and three strikeouts. The Colt .45s managed just one run while San Francisco triumphed, 7–1, handing Dierker the loss. Dierker is the last major leaguer to make his debut during his age-17 season. (Note: As of 2025. The season age of a player is determined by their age as of July 1 of a given year.)

==== Final game at Colt Stadium ====
The final contest at Colt Stadium transpired on September 27, hosting the Los Angeles Dodgers. Both starting pitchers, Don Drysdale and Bob Bruce, pumped at least ten sensational innings each as absolute deterrents to scoring. In the bottom of the ninth, Bruce led off and singled for his first hit, and after one out, Joe Morgan likewise singled for his first hit. However, Drysdale induced a ground ball double play from Rusty Staub to retire the side and dispatch the game into extra innings. Ron Perranoski entered for Drysdale for the bottom of the 11th, who earned a game score of 90.

In the bottom of the 12th, with the game having remained scoreless, Morgan led off with a single, becoming the only player in the game to attain more than one hit. Next, Staub took Morgan's place on a failed sacrifice hit, and Walt Bond was retired on a groundout. With two out, Bob Aspromonte took what would be the stadium's last intentional base on balls so Perranoski could face Jimmy Wynn. However, Wynn foiled the strategy to deliver the final, walk-off, hit, which scored Staub for the concluding run at the stadium and a 1–0 Houston triumph.

Bruce (15–9), who pitched all 12 innings, earned the closing victory via a five-hit, six-strikeout, complete game shutout, and a game score of 96. Each of the nine members of the Colts' starting lineup played through the entire 12 innings. This was the longest outing of Bruce's major league career. Moreover, he became Houston's first-ever 15-game winner in a single season.

==== Performance overview ====
The Houston Colt .45s concluded their third season at 66–96 (.407), replicating their record and ninth-place standing in the National League from the year prior. It was also their third straight 96-loss season, at the time, tying the club record since their premier season of 1962. The Colt .45s hosted 725,793 fans during the season, an improvement by over 6 thousand from the year prior but second-lowest in club history. By contrast, during the inaugural season of the Astrodome the following year in 1965, Houston drew over 2 million for the first time.

Nellie Fox tallied four walk-off hits to lead the major leagues. By contrast, closer Hal Woodeshick, led the major leagues in walk-off hits surrendered. However, Woodeschick also led the National League in saves with 23, to become the first in Colt .45s franchise history to lead the league.

During their three-year stay at Colt Stadium, Aspromonte was the club's all-time home run leader at the park, with 21.

=== Season standings ===
National League
Team	W	L	Pct.	GB	Home	Road
St. Louis Cardinals	93	69	.574	—	48‍–‍33	45‍–‍36
Philadelphia Phillies	92	70	.568	1	46‍–‍35	46‍–‍35
Cincinnati Reds	92	70	.568	1	47‍–‍34	45‍–‍36
San Francisco Giants	90	72	.556	3	44‍–‍37	46‍–‍35
Milwaukee Braves	88	74	.543	5	45‍–‍36	43‍–‍38
Pittsburgh Pirates	80	82	.494	13	42‍–‍39	38‍–‍43
Los Angeles Dodgers	80	82	.494	13	41‍–‍40	39‍–‍42
Chicago Cubs	76	86	.469	17	40‍–‍41	36‍–‍45
Houston Colt .45s	66	96	.407	27	41‍–‍40	25‍–‍56
New York Mets	53	109	.327	40	33‍–‍48	20‍–‍61

=== Record versus opponents ===
National League

1964 National League record Sources:
Team	CHC	CIN	HOU	LAD	MIL	NYM	PHI	PIT	SF	STL
Chicago	—	6–12	11–7	10–8	8–10	11–7	6–12	9–9	9–9	6–12
Cincinnati	12–6	—	12–6	14–4–1	9–9	11–7	9–9	8–10	7–11	10–8
Houston	7–11	6–12	—	7–11	12–6	9–9	5–13	5–13	7–11	8–10
Los Angeles	8–10	4–14–1	11–7	—	8–10	15–3–1	8–10	10–8	6–12	10–8
Milwaukee	10–8	9–9	6–12	10–8	—	14–4	10–8	12–6	9–9	8–10
New York	7–11	7–11	9–9	3–15–1	4–14	—	3–15	6–12	7–11	7–11
Philadelphia	12–6	9–9	13–5	10–8	8–10	15–3	—	10–8	10–8	5–13
Pittsburgh	9–9	10–8	13–5	8–10	6–12	12–6	8–10	—	8–10	6–12
San Francisco	9–9	11–7	11–7	12–6	9–9	11–7	8–10	10–8	—	9–9
St. Louis	12–6	8–10	10–8	8–10	10–8	11–7	13–5	12–6	9–9	—

=== Notable transactions ===
- May 26, 1964: Walt Williams was selected off waivers from the Colt .45s by the St. Louis Cardinals.

=== Roster ===
1964 Houston Colt .45s
Roster
Pitchers: 45 Don Bradey; 38 Hal Brown; 30 Bob Bruce; 44 Danny Coombs; 49 Larry Dierker; 13 Turk Farrell; 39 Dave Giusti; 44 Joe Hoerner; 40 Ken Johnson; 34 Gordon Jones; 31 Don Larsen; 43 Don Nottebart; 33 Jim Owens; 36 Claude Raymond; 46 Hal Woodeshick; 47 Larry Yellen; 37 Chris Zachary	Catchers: 8 Dave Adlesh; 7 John Bateman; 8 Jerry Grote; 9 John Hoffman; Infielders: 14 Bob Aspromonte; 23 Walt Bond; 2 Nellie Fox; 17 Steve Hertz; 19 Sonny Jackson; 11 Eddie Kasko; 15 Bob Lillis; 35 Joe Morgan; 26 Dave Roberts; 3 Pete Runnels; 10 Rusty Staub	Outfielders: 22 Jim Beauchamp; 29 Brock Davis; 22,27 Joe Gaines; 20 Carroll Hardy; 23 Ivan Murrell; 21 Al Spangler; 26 Johnny Weekly; 16 Mike White; 28 Walt Williams; 24 Jimmy Wynn	Manager: 1 Harry Craft; 6 Lum Harris; Coaches: 42 Jimmy Adair (First base); 4 Jim Busby (Third base); 5 Cot Deal (Pitching); 6 Lum Harris (Bench)

== Player stats ==
=== Batting ===
==== Starters by position ====
Note: Pos = Position; G = Games played; AB = At bats; R = Runs scored; H = Hits; 2B = Doubles; 3B = Triples; Avg. = Batting average; HR = Home runs; RBI = Runs batted in; SB = Stolen bases
Positional abbreviations: C = Catcher; 1B = First base; 2B = Second base; 3B = Third base; SS = Shortstop; LF = Left field; CF = Center field; RF = Right field

Pos	Player	G	AB	R	H	2B	3B	Avg.	HR	RBI	SB
C	Jerry Grote	100	298	26	54	9	3	.181	3	24	0
1B	Walt Bond	148	543	63	138	16	7	.254	20	85	2
2B	Nellie Fox	133	442	45	117	12	6	.265	0	28	0
3B	Bob Aspromonte	157	553	51	155	20	3	.280	12	28	6
SS	Eddie Kasko	133	448	45	109	16	1	.243	0	22	4
LF	Al Spangler	135	449	51	110	18	5	.245	4	38	7
CF	Mike White	89	280	30	76	11	3	.271	0	27	1
RF	Joe Gaines	89	307	37	78	9	7	.254	7	34	8

==== Other batters ====
Note: G = Games played; AB = At bats; R = Runs scored; H = Hits; 2B = Doubles; 3B = Triples; Avg. = Batting average; HR = Home runs; RBI = Runs batted in; SB = Stolen bases

Player	G	AB	R	H	2B	3B	Avg.	HR	RBI	SB
Bob Lillis	109	332	31	89	11	2	.268	0	17	4
Rusty Staub	89	292	26	63	10	2	.216	8	35	1
Mike White	89	280	30	76	11	3	.271	0	27	1
John Bateman	74	221	18	42	8	0	.190	5	19	0
Carroll Hardy	46	157	13	29	1	1	.185	2	12	0
Dave Roberts	61	125	9	23	4	1	.184	1	7	0
Jim Beauchamp	23	55	6	9	2	0	.164	2	4	0
Pete Runnels	22	51	3	10	1	0	.196	0	3	0
Joe Morgan	10	37	4	7	0	0	.189	0	0	0
Sonny Jackson	9	23	3	8	1	0	.348	0	1	1
Johnny Weekly	6	15	0	2	0	0	.133	0	3	0
John Hoffman	6	15	1	1	0	0	.067	0	0	0
Ivan Murrell	10	14	1	2	1	0	.143	0	1	0
Dave Adlesh	3	10	0	2	0	0	.200	0	0	0
Walt Williams	10	9	1	0	0	0	.000	0	0	1
Steve Hertz	5	4	2	0	0	0	.000	0	0	0
Brock Davis	1	3	0	0	0	0	.000	0	0	0

=== Pitching ===
==== Starting pitchers ====
Note: G = Games pitched; GS = Games started; IP = Innings pitched; W = Wins; L = Losses; ERA = Earned run average; R = Runs allowed; ER = Earned runs allowed; BB = Walks allowed; K = Strikeouts

Player	G	GS	IP	W	L	ERA	R	ER	BB	K
Ken Johnson	35	35	218.0	11	16	3.63	100	88	44	117
Bob Bruce	35	29	202.1	15	9	2.76	73	70	62	135
Turk Farrell	32	27	198.1	11	10	3.27	80	72	52	117
Don Nottebart	28	24	157.0	6	11	3.90	76	68	37	90
Hal Brown	27	21	132.0	3	15	3.95	68	58	26	53
Chris Zachary	1	1	4.0	0	1	9.00	5	4	1	2

==== Other pitchers ====
Note: G = Games pitched; GS = Games started; IP = Innings pitched; W = Wins; L = Losses; SV = Saves; ERA = Earned run average; R = Runs allowed; ER = Earned runs allowed; BB = Walks allowed; K = Strikeouts

Player	G	GS	IP	W	L	SV	ERA	R	ER	BB	K
Jim Owens	48	11	118.0	8	7	6	3.28	48	43	32	88
Don Larsen	30	10	103.1	4	8	1	2.26	36	26	20	58
Larry Dierker	3	1	9.0	0	1	0	2.00	4	2	3	5
Don Bradey	3	1	2.1	0	2	0	19.29	7	5	3	2

==== Relief pitchers ====
Note: G = Games pitched; IP = Innings pitched; W = Wins; L = Losses; SV = Saves; ERA = Earned run average; R = Runs allowed; ER = Earned runs allowed; BB = Walks allowed; K = Strikeouts

Player	G	IP	W	L	SV	ERA	R	ER	BB	K
Hal Woodeshick	61	78.1	2	9	23	2.76	32	24	32	58
Claude Raymond	38	79.2	5	5	0	2.82	28	25	22	56
Gordon Jones	34	50.0	0	1	0	4.14	24	23	14	28
Larry Yellen	13	21.0	0	0	0	6.86	19	16	10	9
Dave Giusti	8	25.2	0	0	0	3.16	10	9	8	16
Danny Coombs	7	18.0	1	1	0	5.00	10	10	10	14
Joe Hoerner	7	11.0	0	0	0	4.91	11	6	6	4

== Awards and achievements ==
=== Grand slams ===
No.	Date	Astros batter	Venue	Inning	Pitcher	Opposing team	Box
1	June 11	Bob Aspromonte	Colt Stadium	5 (Note: Tied score or took lead.)	John Tsitouris	Cincinnati Reds	
2	June 29	Bob Aspromonte	Colt Stadium	1	Art Mahaffey	Philadelphia Phillies	

=== No-hit game ===
Date	Pitcher	IP	BB	BR	K	BF	Catcher	Final	Opponent	Venue	Plate umpire	Box
April 23, 1964	Ken Johnson	9	2	4	9	31	Jerry Grote	0–1	Cincinnati Reds	Colt Stadium	Augie Donatelli	
April 23, 1964	Johnson: Game score: 92 • Loss (2–1)											

=== Awards ===
1964 Houston Colt .45s award winners
Name of award		Recipient	Ref.
Houston Colt .45s Most Valuable Player (MVP)		Bob Aspromonte	
MLB All-Star Game	Reserve pitcher	Turk Farrell	

=== League leaders ===
Batting

- Sacrifice hits: Nellie Fox (20)

Pitching

- Saves: Hal Woodeshick {23}

=== Milestones ===
==== Major League debuts ====
Player—Appeared at position

- Larry Dierker, starting pitcher
Date and opponent

- September 22 vs San Francisco
Box

Also:

== Minor league system ==
Level	Team	League	Manager
AAA	Oklahoma City 89ers	Pacific Coast League	Grady Hatton
AA	San Antonio Bullets	Texas League	Lou Fitzgerald
A	Modesto Colts	California League	Chuck Churn
A	Durham Bulls	Carolina League	Billy Goodman and Walt Matthews
A	Statesville Colts (Note: Statesville affiliation shared with the Boston Red Sox.)	Western Carolinas League	Dave Philley and Rudy York
Rookie	Cocoa Colts	Cocoa Rookie League	Dave Philley

Championships

- Texas League champions: San Antonio

Awards

- Texas League Most Valuable Player Award (MVP): Joe Morgan, 2B

== See also ==
- List of Major League Baseball annual saves leaders
- List of Major League Baseball no-hitters
- List of Major League Baseball pitchers who have thrown an immaculate inning
