= Bill Sorrell =

Bill Sorrell can refer to:

- Billy Sorrell (1940–2008), American baseball player
- William Sorrell (born 1947), American attorney general
