= Bradey =

Bradey is a surname. Notable people with the surname include:

- Bianca Bradey, Australian actress
- Don Bradey (born 1934), American baseball player
- Lydia Bradey (born 1961), New Zealand mountain climber

== See also ==
- Bradley (surname)
- Brady (surname)
