= 1965 Philadelphia Phillies season =

1965 Philadelphia Phillies
- League: National League
- Ballpark: Connie Mack Stadium
- City: Philadelphia
- Record: 85–76 (.528)
- League place: 5th
- Owners: R. R. M. Carpenter, Jr.
- General managers: John J. Quinn
- Managers: Gene Mauch
- Television: WFIL
- Radio: WFIL (By Saam, Bill Campbell, Richie Ashburn)

The 1965 Philadelphia Phillies season was the 83rd season in the history of the franchise, and the 28th season for the Philadelphia Phillies at Connie Mack Stadium.

== Offseason ==
- October 15, 1964: Bill Heath and a player to be named later were traded by the Phillies to the Chicago White Sox for Rudy May. The Phillies completed the deal by sending Joel Gibson (minors) to the White Sox on November 23.
- December 1, 1964: Danny Cater and Lee Elia were traded by the Phillies to the Chicago White Sox for Ray Herbert and Jeoff Long.
- December 3, 1964: Rudy May and Costen Shockley were traded by the Phillies to the California Angels for Bo Belinsky.
- December 22, 1964: Bobby Del Greco was purchased by the Phillies from the Milwaukee Braves.

== Regular season ==
=== Season standings ===
National League
Team	W	L	Pct.	GB	Home	Road
Los Angeles Dodgers	97	65	.599	—	50‍–‍31	47‍–‍34
San Francisco Giants	95	67	.586	2	51‍–‍30	44‍–‍37
Pittsburgh Pirates	90	72	.556	7	49‍–‍32	41‍–‍40
Cincinnati Reds	89	73	.549	8	49‍–‍32	40‍–‍41
Milwaukee Braves	86	76	.531	11	44‍–‍37	42‍–‍39
Philadelphia Phillies	85	76	.528	11½	45‍–‍35	40‍–‍41
St. Louis Cardinals	80	81	.497	16½	42‍–‍39	38‍–‍42
Chicago Cubs	72	90	.444	25	40‍–‍41	32‍–‍49
Houston Astros	65	97	.401	32	36‍–‍45	29‍–‍52
New York Mets	50	112	.309	47	29‍–‍52	21‍–‍60

=== Record vs. opponents ===
1965 National League record Sources:
Team	CHC	CIN	HOU	LAD	MIL	NYM	PHI	PIT	SF	STL
Chicago	—	7–11	8–10	8–10	9–9	11–7–1	8–10	5–13	6–12	10–8–1
Cincinnati	11–7	—	12–6	6–12	12–6	11–7	13–5	8–10	6–12	10–8
Houston	10–8	6–12	—	5–13	4–14	14–4	6–12	8–10	3–15	9–9
Los Angeles	10–8	12–6	13–5	—	10–8	12–6	9–9	9–9	10–8	12–6
Milwaukee	9–9	6–12	14–4	8–10	—	13–5	6–12	9–9	10–8	11–7
New York	7–11–1	7–11	4–14	6–12	5–13	—	7–11–1	4–14	5–13	5–13
Philadelphia	10–8	5–13	12–6	9–9	12–6	11–7–1	—	8–10	8–10	10–7
Pittsburgh	13–5	10–8	10–8	9–9	9–9	14–4	10–8	—	11–7–1	4–14
San Francisco	12–6	12–6	15–3	8–10	8–10	13–5	10–8	7–11–1	—	10–8
St. Louis	8–10–1	8–10	9–9	6–12	7–11	13–5	7–10	14–4	8–10	—

=== Notable transactions ===
- June 14, 1965: Gus Triandos was purchased from the Phillies by the Houston Astros.
- July 10, 1965: Frank Thomas was purchased from the Phillies by the Houston Astros.
- July 12, 1965: Denny Doyle was signed as an amateur free agent by the Phillies.

== Game log ==
Legend
	Phillies win
	Phillies loss
	Phillies tie
	Postponement
**Bold**	Phillies team member

1965 Game Log
Overall Record: 85–76–1
April (6–8)

#	Date	Opponent	Score	Win	Loss	Save	Attendance	Record
1	April 12	@ Astros	2–0	**Chris Short** (1–0)	Bob Bruce (0–1)	None	42,652	1–0
2	April 14	Giants	2–5	Gaylord Perry (1–0)	**Jim Bunning** (0–1)	Bob Shaw (1)	31,922	1–1
–	April 15	Giants	Postponed (rain); Makeup: July 8 as a traditional double-header					
3	April 17	Dodgers	3–2	**Chris Short** (2–0)	Don Drysdale (1–1)	**Jack Baldschun** (1)	17,021	2–1
4	April 18	Dodgers	2–6	Sandy Koufax (1–0)	**Bo Belinsky** (0–1)	None	11,107	2–2
5	April 19	Astros	8–0	**Jim Bunning** (1–1)	Turk Farrell (1–1)	None	4,668	3–2
6	April 20	Astros	2–1 (13)	**Jack Baldschun** (1–0)	Hal Woodeshick (0–1)	None	6,627	4–2
7	April 21	Astros	4–11	Dave Giusti (1–0)	**Chris Short** (2–1)	None	8,267	4–3
8	April 23	@ Dodgers	0–4	Johnny Podres (1–0)	**Jim Bunning** (1–2)	None	29,120	4–4
9	April 24	@ Dodgers	3–9	Claude Osteen (2–1)	**Bo Belinsky** (0–2)	None	36,500	4–5
10	April 25	@ Dodgers	6–4	**Ray Herbert** (1–0)	Don Drysdale (2–2)	**Jack Baldschun** (2)	25,766	5–5
11	April 26	@ Dodgers	4–3	**Chris Short** (3–1)	Sandy Koufax (2–1)	**Jack Baldschun** (3)	24,703	6–5
12	April 27	@ Giants	13–14	Bob Shaw (1–1)	**Ed Roebuck** (0–1)	None	10,705	6–6
13	April 28	@ Giants	3–9	Ron Herbel (1–0)	**Ray Culp** (0–1)	None	7,922	6–7
14	April 30	@ Braves	1–7	Tony Cloninger (2–2)	**Ray Herbert** (1–1)	None	2,923	6–8

May (14–16)

#	Date	Opponent	Score	Win	Loss	Save	Attendance	Record
15	May 1	@ Braves	1–6	Wade Blasingame (1–2)	**Jim Bunning** (1–3)	None	2,486	6–9
16	May 2 (1)	@ Braves	6–0	**Chris Short** (4–1)	Denny Lemaster (1–2)	None	see 2nd game	7–9
17	May 2 (2)	@ Braves	10–7	**Jack Baldschun** (2–0)	Billy O'Dell (1–1)	None	8,630	8–9
18	May 4	@ Mets	1–2	Al Jackson (1–3)	**Ray Herbert** (1–2)	None	17,321	8–10
19	May 5	@ Mets	1–0	**Jim Bunning** (2–3)	Warren Spahn (2–2)	None	14,134	9–10
20	May 7	Cardinals	0–2	Bob Gibson (5–0)	**Chris Short** (4–2)	None	14,499	9–11
21	May 8	Cardinals	9–8 (11)	**Ray Culp** (1–1)	Nelson Briles (0–1)	None	19,596	10–11
22	May 9	Cardinals	4–2	**Art Mahaffey** (1–0)	Ray Sadecki (0–4)	**Ed Roebuck** (1)	12,930	11–11
23	May 10	Cardinals	4–2 (10)	**Ed Roebuck** (1–1)	Bob Purkey (1–3)	None	14,454	12–11
24	May 11	Reds	1–9	John Tsitouris (3–2)	**Chris Short** (4–3)	Gerry Arrigo (1)	12,438	12–12
25	May 12	Reds	3–4	Sammy Ellis (5–0)	**Ray Culp** (1–2)	Jim O'Toole (1)	12,237	12–13
26	May 13	Reds	7–6 (10)	**Jack Baldschun** (3–0)	Jim Duffalo (0–2)	None	10,573	13–13
27	May 14	Braves	5–2	**Art Mahaffey** (2–0)	Billy O'Dell (1–2)	None	19,629	14–13
28	May 15	Braves	6–4	**Jim Bunning** (3–3)	Wade Blasingame (2–4)	**Jack Baldschun** (4)	8,794	15–13
29	May 16	Braves	6–8 (10)	Billy O'Dell (2–2)	**Jack Baldschun** (3–1)	Wade Blasingame (1)	16,632	15–14
30	May 17	@ Cardinals	2–1	**Bo Belinsky** (1–2)	Curt Simmons (1–5)	None	10,748	16–14
31	May 18	@ Cardinals	2–8	Ray Sadecki (1–4)	**Art Mahaffey** (2–1)	None	8,593	16–15
32	May 19	@ Cardinals	6–7	Bob Purkey (2–3)	**Ed Roebuck** (1–2)	None	18,660	16–16
33	May 20	@ Cardinals	2–12	Bob Gibson (8–0)	**Chris Short** (4–4)	None	13,741	16–17
34	May 21	@ Reds	5–6	Joey Jay (2–1)	**Art Mahaffey** (2–2)	None	14,263	16–18
35	May 22	@ Reds	4–9	Joe Nuxhall (1–1)	**Bo Belinsky** (1–3)	Gerry Arrigo (2)	21,296	16–19
36	May 23	@ Reds	4–3 (10)	**Ed Roebuck** (2–2)	Gerry Arrigo (1–1)	None	14,942	17–19
37	May 24 (1)	Mets	2–6	Warren Spahn (4–4)	**Jim Bunning** (3–4)	None	see 2nd game	17–20
38	May 24 (2)	Mets	1–4	Frank Lary (1–0)	**Chris Short** (4–5)	Tug McGraw (1)		17–21
39	May 25	Mets	10–3	**Ray Herbert** (2–2)	Al Jackson (2–5)	None	6,344	18–21
40	May 26	Pirates	3–5	Tommie Sisk (3–0)	**Art Mahaffey** (2–3)	None	10,212	18–22
–	May 27	Pirates	Postponed (rain and wind); Makeup: July 5 as a traditional double-header					
41	May 28	Cubs	3–1	**Ray Culp** (2–2)	Bob Buhl (5–3)	**Chris Short** (1)	13,663	19–22
42	May 29	Cubs	4–2	**Jim Bunning** (4–4)	Larry Jackson (3–5)	None	4,962	20–22
43	May 30	Cubs	1–4	Dick Ellsworth (6–3)	**Ray Herbert** (2–3)	None	11,696	20–23
44	May 31	@ Pirates	2–5	Don Cardwell (2–2)	**Chris Short** (4–6)	Al McBean (8)	16,366	20–24

June (18–10)

#	Date	Opponent	Score	Win	Loss	Save	Attendance	Record
45	June 1	@ Pirates	0–4	Bob Veale (5–2)	**Art Mahaffey** (2–4)	None	10,478	20–25
–	June 2	@ Pirates	Postponed (rain); Makeup: July 27 as a traditional double-header					
46	June 4	@ Cubs	6–0	**Jim Bunning** (5–4)	Larry Jackson (3–6)	None	3,497	21–25
47	June 5	@ Cubs	8–9	Lindy McDaniel (2–1)	**Gary Wagner** (0–1)	None	6,049	21–26
48	June 6 (1)	@ Cubs	2–1	**Ray Culp** (3–2)	Bob Buhl (5–5)	None	see 2nd game	22–26
49	June 6 (2)	@ Cubs	10–9	**Gary Wagner** (1–1)	Larry Jackson (3–7)	**Ed Roebuck** (2)	16,845	23–26
50	June 7	Dodgers	3–14	Sandy Koufax (8–3)	**Lew Burdette** (0–3)	None	23,345	23–27
51	June 8	Dodgers	1–2	Claude Osteen (4–6)	**Jim Bunning** (5–5)	Ron Perranoski (2)	14,975	23–28
52	June 9	Dodgers	7–3	**Chris Short** (5–6)	Mike Kekich (0–1)	None	16,241	24–28
53	June 10	Dodgers	4–0	**Ray Herbert** (3–3)	Johnny Podres (3–2)	None	19,467	25–28
54	June 11	Astros	6–5 (10)	**Gary Wagner** (2–1)	Jim Owens (2–3)	None	16,825	26–28
55	June 12	Astros	5–4	**Ed Roebuck** (3–2)	Turk Farrell (4–2)	None	7,870	27–28
56	June 13	Astros	5–0	**Chris Short** (6–6)	Claude Raymond (2–3)	None	12,936	28–28
57	June 15	@ Braves	7–12	Tony Cloninger (9–4)	**Art Mahaffey** (2–5)	Phil Niekro (2)	4,065	28–29
58	June 16	@ Braves	6–2	**Jim Bunning** (6–5)	Denny Lemaster (4–6)	None	3,479	29–29
59	June 17	@ Braves	2–4	Billy O'Dell (5–2)	**Ray Culp** (3–3)	None	3,674	29–30
60	June 18	@ Dodgers	4–2	**Chris Short** (7–6)	Johnny Podres (3–3)	None	30,401	30–30
61	June 19	@ Dodgers	0–4	Nick Willhite (1–0)	**Ray Herbert** (3–4)	Ron Perranoski (3)	20,518	30–31
62	June 20 (1)	@ Astros	3–2	**Jim Bunning** (7–5)	Ron Taylor (2–2)	**Gary Wagner** (1)	see 2nd game	31–31
63	June 20 (2)	@ Astros	7–1	**Bo Belinsky** (2–3)	Mike Cuellar (0–1)	None	42,648	32–31
64	June 21	@ Astros	2–6	Turk Farrell (5–2)	**Ray Culp** (3–4)	None	18,271	32–32
65	June 22	@ Astros	7–2	**Chris Short** (8–6)	Bob Bruce (5–9)	**Gary Wagner** (2)	19,331	33–32
66	June 24	@ Giants	3–1	**Jim Bunning** (8–5)	Juan Marichal (11–6)	**Ray Herbert** (1)	8,738	34–32
67	June 25	@ Giants	1–4	Bob Shaw (7–4)	**Bo Belinsky** (2–4)	None	12,948	34–33
68	June 26	@ Giants	5–6	Masanori Murakami (1–1)	**Gary Wagner** (2–2)	None	18,247	34–34
69	June 27	@ Giants	6–0	**Ray Culp** (4–4)	Bobby Bolin (3–4)	None	27,015	35–34
70	June 28	Cardinals	3–0	**Chris Short** (9–6)	Tracy Stallard (4–3)	None	19,208	36–34
71	June 29	Cardinals	7–1	**Bo Belinsky** (3–4)	Bob Purkey (5–6)	None	19,219	37–34
72	June 30	Braves	3–2	**Gary Wagner** (3–2)	Wade Blasingame (8–6)	None	17,771	38–34

July (15–15)

#	Date	Opponent	Score	Win	Loss	Save	Attendance	Record
73	July 1	Braves	2–1	**Ray Culp** (5–4)	Ken Johnson (6–4)	None	17,792	39–34
74	July 2	Reds	4–3	**Jack Baldschun** (4–1)	Gerry Arrigo (2–4)	None	22,516	40–34
75	July 3	Reds	8–10	Billy McCool (6–5)	**Ed Roebuck** (3–3)	Roger Craig (3)	25,152	40–35
76	July 4	Reds	1–4	Joe Nuxhall (3–2)	**Bo Belinsky** (3–5)	None	14,749	40–36
77	July 5 (1)	Pirates	3–1	**Jim Bunning** (9–5)	Bob Veale (8–6)	None	see 2nd game	41–36
78	July 5 (2)	Pirates	6–2	**Ed Roebuck** (4–3)	Wilbur Wood (0–1)	**Gary Wagner** (3)	25,330	42–36
79	July 6	Pirates	4–8	Don Cardwell (8–2)	**Ray Culp** (5–5)	None	17,357	42–37
80	July 7	Pirates	1–0	**Chris Short** (10–6)	Bob Friend (4–7)	None	16,632	43–37
81	July 8 (1)	Giants	2–10	Gaylord Perry (7–7)	**Lew Burdette** (0–4)	None	see 2nd game	43–38
82	July 8 (2)	Giants	4–2	**Ray Herbert** (4–4)	Jack Sanford (4–2)	None	37,110	44–38
83	July 9	Giants	10–2	**Jim Bunning** (10–5)	Jack Sanford (4–3)	None	27,954	45–38
84	July 10	Giants	0–7	Juan Marichal (14–7)	**Ray Culp** (5–6)	None	32,031	45–39
–	July 11	Giants	Postponed (rain); Makeup: August 31 as a traditional double-header					
–	July 13	**1965 Major League Baseball All-Star Game at Metropolitan Stadium in Bloomington**						
85	July 15	@ Reds	1–8	Joe Nuxhall (6–2)	**Chris Short** (10–7)	None	15,606	45–40
86	July 16	@ Reds	1–5	Sammy Ellis (13–5)	**Jim Bunning** (10–6)	None	18,584	45–41
87	July 17	@ Reds	14–7	**Ed Roebuck** (5–3)	John Tsitouris (5–6)	None	8,225	46–41
88	July 18	@ Cardinals	1–3	Tracy Stallard (7–3)	**Bo Belinsky** (3–6)	Hal Woodeshick (11)	18,846	46–42
89	July 19	@ Cardinals	5–2	**Chris Short** (11–7)	Ray Washburn (5–7)	None	16,571	47–42
90	July 20	@ Cardinals	3–4	Curt Simmons (6–9)	**Jim Bunning** (10–7)	Nelson Briles (1)	10,108	47–43
91	July 21	@ Cubs	7–8 (10)	Bob Hendley (1–2)	**Bo Belinsky** (3–7)	None	9,585	47–44
92	July 22	@ Cubs	6–10	Bob Buhl (10–7)	**Ray Herbert** (4–5)	Ted Abernathy (20)	7,468	47–45
93	July 23	@ Mets	2–3 (10)	Jack Fisher (7–11)	**Jack Baldschun** (4–2)	None	38,533	47–46
94	July 24	@ Mets	5–1	**Jim Bunning** (11–7)	Tom Parsons (1–6)	None	36,921	48–46
95	July 25 (1)	@ Mets	1–8	Galen Cisco (2–6)	**Bo Belinsky** (3–8)	Gary Kroll (1)	see 2nd game	48–47
96	July 25 (2)	@ Mets	3–1	**Ray Culp** (6–6)	Al Jackson (5–13)	None	36,921	49–47
97	July 27 (1)	@ Pirates	3–1	**Gary Wagner** (4–2)	Bob Friend (5–8)	**Jack Baldschun** (5)	see 2nd game	50–47
98	July 27 (2)	@ Pirates	2–3 (10)	Don Schwall (6–3)	**Gary Wagner** (4–3)	None	21,832	50–48
99	July 28	@ Pirates	1–0 (14)	**Jack Baldschun** (5–2)	Don Schwall (6–4)	None	13,207	51–48
100	July 29	@ Pirates	5–0	**Ray Culp** (7–6)	Bob Veale (10–8)	None	10,160	52–48
101	July 30	Mets	5–3	**Lew Burdette** (1–4)	Al Jackson (5–14)	**Gary Wagner** (4)	16,429	53–48
102	July 31	Mets	3–4 (11)	Gary Kroll (6–6)	**Jack Baldschun** (5–3)	Gordie Richardson (1)	10,207	53–49

August (15–14)

#	Date	Opponent	Score	Win	Loss	Save	Attendance	Record
103	August 1	Mets	3–2	**Jim Bunning** (12–7)	Tom Parsons (1–8)	**Gary Wagner** (5)	8,935	54–49
104	August 3	Cubs	0–2	Bill Faul (2–2)	**Ray Culp** (7–7)	None	17,171	54–50
105	August 4	Cubs	7–2	**Chris Short** (12–7)	Bob Buhl (12–8)	None	13,515	55–50
106	August 5	Cubs	4–3	**Lew Burdette** (2–4)	Dick Ellsworth (12–8)	**Bo Belinsky** (1)	14,867	56–50
107	August 6	Pirates	4–0	**Jim Bunning** (13–7)	Bob Friend (5–9)	None	22,155	57–50
108	August 7	Pirates	3–4	Al McBean (4–5)	**Ray Culp** (7–8)	None	8,204	57–51
109	August 8 (1)	Pirates	1–7	Bob Veale (12–8)	**Chris Short** (12–8)	None	see 2nd game	57–52
110	August 8 (2)	Pirates	5–2	**Ray Herbert** (5–5)	Tommie Sisk (3–2)	None	29,260	58–52
111	August 9	@ Astros	0–8	Robin Roberts (6–7)	**Lew Burdette** (2–5)	None	31,209	58–53
112	August 10	@ Astros	2–0	**Jim Bunning** (14–7)	Bob Bruce (7–15)	None	24,533	59–53
113	August 11	@ Astros	5–1	**Ray Culp** (8–8)	Danny Coombs (0–1)	None	28,224	60–53
114	August 12	@ Astros	7–3	**Chris Short** (13–8)	Turk Farrell (8–7)	**Ed Roebuck** (3)	22,011	61–53
115	August 13	@ Giants	3–2	**Bo Belinsky** (4–8)	Warren Spahn (5–14)	**Gary Wagner** (6)	24,275	62–53
116	August 14	@ Giants	4–2	**Jim Bunning** (15–7)	Juan Marichal (18–9)	**Jack Baldschun** (6)	23,087	63–53
117	August 15	@ Giants	9–15	Bill Henry (3–1)	**Ray Culp** (8–9)	Jack Sanford (2)	26,931	63–54
118	August 16	@ Dodgers	6–1	**Chris Short** (14–8)	Johnny Podres (4–6)	None	22,611	64–54
119	August 17	@ Dodgers	2–4	Claude Osteen (11–11)	**Ray Herbert** (5–6)	Ron Perranoski (10)	23,144	64–55
120	August 18	@ Dodgers	6–3 (12)	**Gary Wagner** (5–3)	Jim Brewer (2–2)	None	38,267	65–55
121	August 20	Reds	2–3 (10)	Sammy Ellis (16–7)	**Gary Wagner** (5–4)	None	28,709	65–56
122	August 21	Reds	1–2 (11)	Joe Nuxhall (10–3)	**Jack Baldschun** (5–4)	Billy McCool (15)	10,000	65–57
123	August 22	Reds	6–5	**Jim Bunning** (16–7)	Roger Craig (0–4)	**Gary Wagner** (7)	8,431	66–57
124	August 24	Astros	3–4	Don Nottebart (4–11)	**Gary Wagner** (5–5)	None	13,863	66–58
125	August 25	Astros	6–7	Ron Taylor (3–5)	**Jack Baldschun** (5–5)	Jim Owens (6)	11,066	66–59
126	August 26	Astros	4–6	Dave Giusti (7–5)	**Gary Wagner** (5–6)	Jim Owens (7)	21,805	66–60
127	August 27	Dodgers	8–9	Don Drysdale (18–11)	**Ray Herbert** (5–7)	Howie Reed (1)	26,740	66–61
128	August 28	Dodgers	4–8	Jim Brewer (3–2)	**Chris Short** (14–9)	Sandy Koufax (1)	27,439	66–62
129	August 29	Dodgers	13–3	**Ray Culp** (9–9)	Claude Osteen (11–13)	None	21,744	67–62
130	August 31 (1)	Giants	1–2 (11)	Frank Linzy (5–2)	**Gary Wagner** (5–7)	None	see 2nd game	67–63
131	August 31 (2)	Giants	2–0	**Lew Burdette** (3–5)	Warren Spahn (6–16)	None	33,060	68–63

September (14–13)

#	Date	Opponent	Score	Win	Loss	Save	Attendance	Record
–	September 1	Giants	Postponed (rain); Makeup: September 2 as a traditional double-header					
132	September 2 (1)	Giants	4–3	**Chris Short** (15–9)	Juan Marichal (19–10)	None	see 2nd game	69–63
133	September 2 (2)	Giants	2–5	Frank Linzy (6–2)	**Jack Baldschun** (5–6)	None	30,410	69–64
134	September 3	@ Reds	7–16	Roger Craig (1–4)	**Grant Jackson** (0–1)	None	11,421	69–65
135	September 4	@ Reds	4–5	Joey Jay (9–5)	**Jim Bunning** (16–8)	None	17,469	69–66
136	September 5	@ Reds	9–10	Billy McCool (9–8)	**Jack Baldschun** (5–7)	None	18,119	69–67
137	September 6 (1)	@ Cardinals	3–10	Tracy Stallard (10–6)	**Bo Belinsky** (4–9)	None	see 2nd game	69–68
138	September 6 (2)	@ Cardinals	10–5	**Chris Short** (16–9)	Curt Simmons (9–14)	None	21,867	70–68
139	September 8	@ Braves	6–5	**Ray Culp** (10–9)	Ken Johnson (15–9)	**Chris Short** (2)	3,417	71–68
–	September 9	@ Braves	Postponed (rain); Makeup: September 20					
140	September 10	Cardinals	5–4 (12)	**Ferguson Jenkins** (1–0)	Hal Woodeshick (6–6)	None	16,333	72–68
141	September 11	Cardinals	3–1	**Chris Short** (17–9)	Tracy Stallard (10–7)	None	13,558	73–68
–	September 12	Cardinals	Cancelled (rain; Hurricane Betsy); Was not rescheduled					
142	September 13	Braves	4–3	**Ray Culp** (11–9)	Phil Niekro (1–3)	None	5,647	74–68
143	September 14	Braves	2–0	**Jim Bunning** (17–8)	Hank Fischer (7–7)	None	11,050	75–68
144	September 15	Braves	2–4	Tony Cloninger (22–9)	**Chris Short** (17–10)	Dan Osinski (5)	10,932	75–69
145	September 16	Braves	8–6	**Gary Wagner** (6–7)	Denny Lemaster (6–12)	**Ferguson Jenkins** (1)	11,336	76–69
146	September 17	@ Pirates	0–4	Don Cardwell (12–10)	**Ray Culp** (11–10)	None	8,987	76–70
147	September 18	@ Pirates	3–4	Roy Face (2–1)	**Morrie Steevens** (0–1)	None	5,313	76–71
148	September 19	@ Pirates	0–1 (10)	Bob Veale (17–11)	**Jack Baldschun** (5–8)	None	10,026	76–72
149	September 20	@ Braves	4–1	**Ray Culp** (12–10)	Wade Blasingame (16–10)	None	812	77–72
150	September 21	@ Cubs	5–7	Ted Abernathy (4–4)	**Ferguson Jenkins** (1–1)	None	892	77–73
–	September 22	@ Cubs	Postponed (rain); Makeup: September 23 as a traditional double-header					
151	September 23 (1)	@ Cubs	11–5	**Jim Bunning** (18–8)	Larry Jackson (13–20)	None	see 2nd game	78–73
152	September 23 (2)	@ Cubs	7–4	**Chris Short** (18–10)	Bill Faul (5–6)	None	1,598	79–73
–	September 24	Mets	Postponed (rain); Makeup: September 25 as a traditional double-header					
153	September 25 (1)	Mets	4–1	**Ray Culp** (13–10)	Larry Bearnarth (3–4)	None	see 2nd game	80–73
154	September 25 (2)	Mets	1–4	Carl Willey (1–2)	**Ray Herbert** (5–8)	None	6,825	80–74
155	September 26	Mets	5–4 (10)	**Grant Jackson** (1–1)	Jack Fisher (8–23)	None	9,029	81–74
156	September 27	Cubs	0–1	Larry Jackson (14–20)	**Jim Bunning** (18–9)	None	4,390	81–75
157	September 28	Cubs	1–2	Bill Faul (6–6)	**Chris Short** (18–11)	None	3,928	81–76
158	September 29	Cubs	7–6	**Gary Wagner** (7–7)	Lindy McDaniel (5–6)	None	4,609	82–76

October (3–0–1)

#	Date	Opponent	Score	Win	Loss	Save	Attendance	Record
–	October 1	@ Mets	Postponed (rain); Makeup: October 2 as a traditional double-header					
159	October 2 (1)	@ Mets	6–0	**Jim Bunning** (19–9)	Larry Bearnarth (3–5)	None	see 2nd game	83–76
160	October 2 (2)	@ Mets	0–0 (18)	None	None	None	10,371	83–76–1
161	October 3 (1)	@ Mets	3–1	**Ray Culp** (14–10)	Al Jackson (8–20)	None	see 2nd game	84–76–1
162	October 3 (2)	@ Mets	3–1 (13)	**Ferguson Jenkins** (2–1)	Jack Fisher (8–24)	None	18,508	85–76–1

== Roster ==
1965 Philadelphia Phillies
Roster
Pitchers: 27 Jack Baldschun; 33 Bo Belinsky; 14 Jim Bunning; 30 Lew Burdette; 37 Ray Culp; 30 Ryne Duren; 21 Ray Herbert; 29 Grant Jackson; 46 Fergie Jenkins; 28 Art Mahaffey; 17 Ed Roebuck; 41 Chris Short; 47,23 Morrie Steevens; 64,31 Gary Wagner	Catchers: 10 Pat Corrales; 11 Clay Dalrymple; 9 Gus Triandos; Infielders: 15 Dick Allen; 20 Rubén Amaro; 22 John Herrnstein; 16 Cookie Rojas; 24 Billy Sorrell; 7 Dick Stuart; 8 Tony Taylor; 13 Bobby Wine	Outfielders: 12 Johnny Briggs; 6 Johnny Callison; 43 Wes Covington; 29 Bobby Del Greco; 25 Tony González; 26 Alex Johnson; 23 Adolfo Phillips; 24 Frank Thomas	Manager: 4 Gene Mauch; Coaches: 3 Peanuts Lowrey; 2 Cal McLish; 1 George Myatt; 5 Bob Oldis

== Player stats ==
=== Batting ===
==== Starters by position ====
Note: Pos = Position; G = Games played; AB = At bats; H = Hits; Avg. = Batting average; HR = Home runs; RBI = Runs batted in

Pos	Player	G	AB	H	Avg.	HR	RBI
C	Clay Dalrymple	103	301	64	.213	4	23
1B	Dick Stuart	149	538	126	.234	28	95
2B	Cookie Rojas	142	521	158	.303	3	42
SS	Bobby Wine	139	394	90	.228	5	33
3B	Dick Allen	161	619	187	.302	20	85
LF	Alex Johnson	97	262	77	.294	8	28
CF	Johnny Briggs	93	229	54	.236	4	23
RF	Johnny Callison	160	619	162	.262	32	101

==== Other batters ====
Note: G = Games played; AB = At bats; H = Hits; Avg. = Batting average; HR = Home runs; RBI = Runs batted in

Player	G	AB	H	Avg.	HR	RBI
Tony González	108	370	109	.295	13	41
Tony Taylor	106	323	74	.229	3	27
Wes Covington	101	235	58	.247	15	45
Rubén Amaro Sr.	118	184	39	.212	0	15
Pat Corrales	63	174	39	.224	2	15
Adolfo Phillips	41	87	20	.230	3	5
John Herrnstein	63	85	17	.200	1	5
Gus Triandos	30	82	14	.171	0	4
Frank Thomas	35	77	20	.260	1	7
Billy Sorrell	10	13	5	.385	1	2
Bobby Del Greco	8	4	0	.000	0	0

=== Pitching ===
==== Starting pitchers ====
Note: G = Games pitched; IP = Innings pitched; W = Wins; L = Losses; ERA = Earned run average; SO = Strikeouts

Player	G	IP	W	L	ERA	SO
Chris Short	47	297.1	18	11	2.82	237
Jim Bunning	39	291.0	19	9	2.60	268
Ray Culp	33	204.1	14	10	3.22	134
Ray Herbert	25	130.2	5	8	3.86	51

==== Other pitchers ====
Note: G = Games pitched; IP = Innings pitched; W = Wins; L = Losses; ERA = Earned run average; SO = Strikeouts

Player	G	IP	W	L	ERA	SO
Bo Belinsky	30	109.2	4	9	4.84	71
Art Mahaffey	22	71.0	2	5	6.21	52
Lew Burdette	19	70.2	3	3	5.48	23
Grant Jackson	6	13.2	1	1	7.24	15

==== Relief pitchers ====
Note: G = Games pitched; W = Wins; L = Losses; SV = Saves; ERA = Earned run average; SO = Strikeouts

Player	G	W	L	SV	ERA	SO
Gary Wagner	59	7	7	7	3.00	91
Jack Baldschun	65	5	8	6	3.82	81
Ed Roebuck	44	5	3	3	3.40	29
Ferguson Jenkins	7	2	1	1	2.19	10
Ryne Duren	6	0	0	0	3.27	6
Morrie Steevens	6	0	1	0	16.88	3

== Farm system ==
Level	Team	League	Manager
AAA	Arkansas Travelers	Pacific Coast League	Frank Lucchesi
AA	Chattanooga Lookouts	Southern League	Andy Seminick
A	Bakersfield Bears	California League	Dick Teed
A	Miami Marlins	Florida State League	Bobby Morgan
A	Eugene Emeralds	Northwest League	Bob Wellman
A	Spartanburg Phillies	Western Carolinas League	Moose Johnson
Short-Season A	Huron Phillies	Northern League	Joe Lonnett
