= Gary Wagner (baseball) =

American baseball player (1940–2026)

- Pitcher
- Born: June 28, 1940; Bridgeport, Illinois, U.S.
- Died: March 11, 2026 (aged 85); Bedford, Indiana, U.S.
- Batted: Right Threw: Right

MLB debut
- April 18, 1965, for the Philadelphia Phillies

Last MLB appearance
- September 26, 1970, for the Boston Red Sox

MLB statistics
- Win–loss record: 15–19
- Earned run average: 3.70
- Strikeouts: 174
- Stats at Baseball Reference

Teams
- Philadelphia Phillies (1965–1969); Boston Red Sox (1969–1970)

Gary Edward Wagner (June 28, 1940 – March 11, 2026) was an American professional baseball right-handed pitcher, who played in Major League Baseball (MLB) for the Philadelphia Phillies and Boston Red Sox from 1965 to 1970.

== Biography ==
Wagner, a native of Bridgeport, Illinois, graduated from Bridgeport High School. He attended Eastern Illinois University and signed with the Phillies in 1962. Listed as 6 feet 4 inches (1.93 m) tall and 185 pounds (84 kg), Wagner spent three years in the Philadelphia farm system before making the Phillies in 1965.

Wagner was primarily a relief pitcher during his MLB career, with only four starting assignments among his 162 total games pitched. During his rookie campaign with the 1965 Phillies, he made a career-high 59 appearances and earned seven saves. He also set career bests in games won (seven) and lost (seven). Wagner split both 1966 and 1967 between the Phils and Triple-A San Diego. But in 1968, he played a full season with Philadelphia, and was credited with eight saves, his personal best.

In May of 1969, Wagner again was demoted to Triple-A and spent much of the campaign with Triple-A Eugene, winning 11 games. Then, in September, he was traded to the Red Sox, for whom he played until the end of the 1970 season. When 1971 began, he was released by the Red Sox. He signed with the Montreal Expos' organization, played for almost two months in their system, then was released again. Boston picked him up in late May and assigned him to Triple-A, but released him again on July 5, ending his professional baseball career. As a major leaguer, Wagner worked in 2671/3 innings pitched, allowing 250 hits and 126 bases on balls; he struck out 174 and was credited with 22 saves.

Wagner had a wife, Freddie Jean, and three sons, Gary Jr. (born 1963), Anthony (born 1966) and Craig (born 1970). He resided in Seymour, Indiana, with his wife. He had seven grandchildren and played golf regularly at Otter Creek Golf Course in Columbus, Indiana.

Wagner died at his home in Bedford, Indiana, on March 11, 2026, at the age of 85.
