= Joe Gaines =

American baseball player (1936–2023)

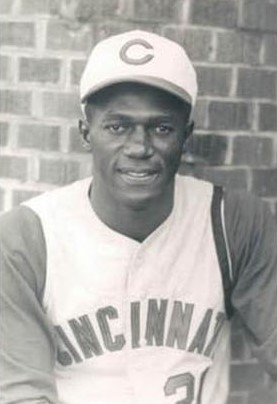
- Outfielder
- Born: November 22, 1936; Bryan, Texas, U.S.
- Died: May 30, 2023 (aged 86); Oakland, California, U.S.
- Batted: Right Threw: Right

MLB debut
- June 29, 1960, for the Cincinnati Reds

Last MLB appearance
- October 2, 1966, for the Houston Astros

MLB statistics
- Batting average: .241
- Home runs: 21
- Runs batted in: 95

NPB statistics
- Batting average: .205
- Home runs: 11
- Runs batted in: 3
- Stats at Baseball Reference

Teams
- Cincinnati Reds (1960–1962); Baltimore Orioles (1963–1964); Houston Colt .45s/Astros (1964–1966); Hanshin Tigers (1969)

Arnesta Joe Gaines (November 22, 1936 – May 30, 2023) was an American professional baseball outfielder. He spent all or parts of seven seasons (1960–66) in Major League Baseball as a member of the Cincinnati Reds, Baltimore Orioles and Houston Colt .45s/Astros. Gaines threw and batted right-handed, stood 6 ft 1 in (1.85 m) tall and weighed 190 lb (86 kg).

After attending Oakland Technical High School in Oakland, California, Gaines was signed by Cincinnati in 1956. His best season in minor league baseball came in 1957, when he batted .359 with 14 home runs and 119 runs batted in for the Visalia Redlegs of the Class C California League. After receiving brief trails with the 1960 and 1961 Reds, he made the team's 25-man roster in 1962, batting .231 in 60 games played as a reserve outfielder, then was traded to Baltimore that December.

In 1963, Gaines occasionally spelled left-handed-hitting Boog Powell as the Orioles' left fielder and batted an MLB career-high .286. But Gaines got off to a poor start in 1964 and Baltimore traded him to Houston on June 15. He took over as the Colt .45s' regular right fielder, playing 89 games and batting .254. The 1965 season saw Gaines lose his regular job to Rusty Staub and he reverted to a backup role; although he appeared in 100 games, he batted only .227. Apart from a brief stint with 1966 Astros, when he garnered only one hit in 13 at bats, Gaines spent the final three seasons of his playing career in the Triple-A Pacific Coast League. He retired after the 1968 season.

Overall, Gaines hit .241 with 21 home runs and 95 RBI in 362 Major League games, and batted .298 with 76 homers in 949 minor-league appearances.

Gaines died in Oakland, California, on May 30, 2023, at the age of 86.
