= New York Police and Fire Widows' and Children's Benefit Fund =

- Formation: 1985
- Founders: Rusty Staub, J. Patrick "Paddy" Burns
- Region served: New York City
- Chair: Stephen J. Dannhauser
- President: Philip V. Moyles Jr.
- Revenue: US $16.5 million (2021)
- Website: www.answerthecall.org

The New York Police and Fire Widows' and Children's Benefit Fund is a non-profit organization dedicated to supporting the families of New York City's first responders who have been killed in the line of duty.

== History ==
=== Creation of the fund ===
The Fund was created in 1985, by former New York Mets player Rusty Staub and J. Patrick "Paddy" Burns, then-Vice President of the New York Patrolmen's Benevolent Association. Staub was inspired to create the fund after reading a news story about a New York City Police officer killed the line of duty. When Rusty was a boy, his uncle Marvin Morton was also killed in the line of duty as a New Orleans police officer, leaving behind a wife and young children. Speaking about the loss, Staub remembered "How difficult it was for my uncle's family, I remember saying the rosary on the bed with my mom. That was the first time I saw her cry." Staub determined to help this officer's family, and other families who had lost a loved one in answering the call.

In its initial years, the organization hosted an annual gala, where widows and donors came together to support one another and raise funds for the cause. In addition, families would enjoy for a picnic at Shea Stadium, where children would throw out the first pitch and beneficiaries connected with the approximately six to eight new families who had lost a loved one that year.

=== September 11th Terrorist Attacks ===
The 9/11 terrorist attacks on the New York City World Trade Center resulted in the loss of 2,606 lives, including 343 firefighters and 71 law enforcement officers. At the time, families received a $10,000 death benefit from the charity. 350 first-responder families represented an immediate need for $4 million, which was met and exceeded in the weeks that followed. In the months following the 9/11 terrorist attacks, the fund was able to give over $117 million to its beneficiaries.

== Fundraising ==
Prior to the September 11, 2001 attacks, the fund had raised $13 million in its then-16 year history, supporting approximately 500 families. In 2021, the Fund reported revenue of $16.5 million, including nearly $5.5 million in donations.

On the eighth anniversary of 9/11, Brooklyn native Jay-Z staged a concert for the Fund's annual benefit, "Answer the Call", in Madison Square Garden on September 11, 2009, raising over $750,000 to benefit the Fund. Two years later, Beyoncé, Jay-Z's spouse, who had performed at "Answer the Call", released the single "God Bless the USA", with all proceeds pledged to benefit the Fund.

In 2012, the Fund was a beneficiary of the Tour of Duty Ride, in which 24 cyclists departed from San Diego, California on August 11, riding to the Intrepid Sea, Air & Space Museum in New York City by September 17.

In 2015, the Fund's 3rd Annual benefit at the Empire Hotel Rooftop featured Staten Island natives Sal Vulcano, Pete Davidson, and Colin Jost to help raise funds. Davidson' father, Scott, an FDNY firefighter, lost his life as a 9/11 first responder. Jost's mother, Kerry Kelly, is the chief medical officer of the city Fire Department, and was also a first responder at the World Trade Center.

== Leadership ==
The fund is an independent 501(c)(3) charity and does not receive any federal, state or city dollars but relies exclusively on private donations. As at September 2023, board officers are:

- Stephen J. Dannhauser (chair)
- Philip V. Moyles Jr. (President)
- Lawrence M.v.D. Schloss (Vice Chair)
- Mark Messier (Vice President, Community Affairs)
- John R. Nola (Treasurer)
- Lauren A. Koslow (Assistant Treasurer)
- Brian A. Waldbaum (Secretary)
