= Gene Ratliff =

American baseball player (born 1945)

- Pinch hitter
- Born: September 28, 1945 (age 80); Macon, Georgia, U.S.
- Batted: Right Threw: Right

MLB debut
- May 15, 1965, for the Houston Astros

Last MLB appearance
- August 8, 1965, for the Houston Astros

MLB statistics
- Games played: 4
- Plate appearancess: 4
- Strikeouts: 4
- Stats at Baseball Reference

Teams
- Houston Astros (1965)

Kelly Eugene Ratliff (born September 28, 1945 in Macon, Georgia) is an American former professional baseball player who played four games in his major league career, all for the Houston Astros in 1965. He struck out four times in four at bats.
