= Don Arlich =

American baseball player (born 1943)

- Pitcher
- Born: February 15, 1943 (age 83); Wayne, Michigan, U.S.
- Batted: Left Threw: Left

MLB debut
- October 2, 1965, for the Houston Astros

Last MLB appearance
- August 4, 1966, for the Houston Astros

MLB statistics
- Win–loss record: 0–1
- Earned run average: 8.10
- Strikeouts: 1
- Stats at Baseball Reference

Teams
- Houston Astros (1965–1966)

Donald Louis Arlich (born February 15, 1943) is an American former professional baseball player whose career spanned nine seasons, including parts of two in Major League Baseball with the Houston Astros in 1965 and 1966. During his major league career, Arlich compiled a record of 0–1 with an 8.10 earned run average (ERA) in eight games, one start. He also played in the minor leagues with the Class-A Jacksonville Jets; the Class-B, and later Class-A Durham Bulls; the Double-A San Antonio Bullets; the Double-A Amarillo Sonics; the Triple-A Oklahoma City 89ers; the Double-A Austin Braves; and the Triple-A Richmond Braves. While in the minors, Arlich compiled a record of 45–48 with a 3.86 ERA in 221 games, 107 starts.

== Professional career ==
=== Houston Colt .45s/Astros ===
Arlich signed with the Houston Colt .45s as an amateur free agent in 1961. They signed him from North St. Paul High School in St. Paul, Minnesota and he received a signing bonus of US$45,000 after joining the organization. During his first season in the minor leagues, he played with the Jacksonville Jets, who were members of the Class-A South Atlantic League. On the season, Arlich went 1–2 with a 7.00 earned run average (ERA) in seven games, five starts. In 1962, he played with the Class-B Durham Bulls, who were members of the Carolina League. With the Bulls that season, Arlich went 3–3 with a 4.09 ERA, two complete games and 29 strikeouts in six games, all starts. Arlich continued playing with the Bulls in 1963, who were now re-classified as a Class-A team. On the season, Arlich went 10–7 with a 4.05 ERA in 24 games, all starts.

In 1964, the Houston Colt .45s assigned Arlich to their Double-A affiliate, the San Antonio Bullets. During the season, he compiled a record of 7–3 with a 3.00 ERA and 79 strikeouts in 27 games, 15 starts. In 1965, the Colt .45s changed their name to the "Astros" and assigned Arlich to the Double-A Amarillo Sonics of the Texas League. In the minors that season, Arlich compiled a record of 8–8 with a 3.45 ERA and 125 strikeouts in 33 games, 23 starts. He also made his first career appearance in Major League Baseball that season on October 2, the 161^{th} game of the season. In that game, Arlich pitched six innings; giving-up five hits; two runs, both earned; and one walk against the St. Louis Cardinals.

Arlich began the 1966 season in the minors, but would later make appearances in the majors. During his time in the minors that season, he played with the Triple-A Oklahoma City 89ers and went 6–10 with a 4.41 ERA and 72 strikeouts in 29 games, 17 starts. In July of that year, the Astros called Arlich up to the majors after they released pitcher Robin Roberts. Arlich pitched in his first game of the season on July 9, against the St. Louis Cardinals. In one inning relief during that game, he gave-up no hits or runs. He got his first career major league loss on July 20, against the Philadelphia Phillies. In that game, he also got his first and only major league strikeout. Arlich made his last appearance in Major League Baseball that season on August 4, against the Philadelphia Phillies. He started the 1967 season in the Astros minor league organization with the Double-A Amarillo Sonics.

=== Atlanta Braves ===
During the 1967 season, Arlich joined the Atlanta Braves organization, playing for their Double-A affiliate, the Austin Braves of the Texas League. Between the two teams in both the Braves and Houston Astros organizations, he compiled a record of 3–7 with a 3.22 ERA and 65 strikeouts in 29 games, 14 starts. In 1968, the Braves assigned Arlich to the Richmond Braves, who were members of the Triple-A International League. He went 5–6 that season with a 4.06 ERA and 49 strikeouts in 42 games, all but one of which were in relief. Arlich continued playing with Richmond in 1969, the season that would prove to be his last as a professional baseball player. On the season, Arlich went 2–2 with a 4.42 ERA, two saves and 33 strikeouts in 24 games, all but two of which were in relief.
