= Ron Brand =

American baseball player (born 1940)

- Catcher
- Born: January 13, 1940 (age 86); Los Angeles, California, U.S.
- Batted: Right Threw: Right

MLB debut
- May 26, 1963, for the Pittsburgh Pirates

Last MLB appearance
- September 25, 1971, for the Montreal Expos

MLB statistics
- Batting average: .239
- Home runs: 3
- Runs batted in: 106
- Stats at Baseball Reference

Teams
- Pittsburgh Pirates (1963); Houston Astros (1965–1968); Montreal Expos (1969–1971)

Ronald George Brand (born January 13, 1940) is an American former professional baseball player. He played in Major League Baseball as a catcher, and was an original member of the Montreal Expos.

== Career ==
=== Pittsburgh Pirates ===
Brand originally signed with the Pittsburgh Pirates as an amateur free agent after attending North Hollywood High School, he spent five seasons in their farm system before debuting with the big league club in 1963. He hit his first major league home run on June 20, off Denny Lemaster of the Milwaukee Braves.

=== Houston Astros ===
After spending all of 1964 in the minors, Brand was selected in the 1964 rule 5 draft by the Houston Colt .45s, who rebranded as the Astros ahead of the 1965 season.

John Bateman was Houston's Opening Day starting catcher in 1965, however, he soon lost his starting job to Brand. On August 18, Brand hit his second home run of the season, and the third of his career. He never hit another major league home run.

In 1966, Bateman won back the starting catcher job, and Brand became the back-up. They split catching duties pretty evenly in 1967, but Brand began the 1968 season with the Astros' Pacific Coast League triple A affiliate, the Oklahoma City 89ers, and only appeared in 29 games behind the plate for the Astros.

=== Montreal Expos ===
On October 14, 1968, Bateman was drafted by the Montreal Expos as the sixth overall pick in the 1968 Major League Baseball expansion draft; 52 picks later, the Expos selected Brand, and the two resumed their platoon in Montreal.

This platoon only lasted one season as in 1970 Brand assumed more of a utility infielder role. In 1971, Brand only caught two innings, however, made 22 appearances at shortstop. He spent all of 1972 with the Expos' triple A affiliate, the Peninsula Whips, and was released at the end of the season. He joined the Los Angeles Dodgers in 1975, and spent the entire season in Bakersfield, California as player/manager of their California League affiliate before retiring.
