= Bruce Von Hoff =

American baseball player (1943-2012)

- Pitcher
- Born: November 17, 1943; Oakland, California, U.S.
- Died: September 11, 2012 (aged 68); Gulfport, Florida, U.S.
- Batted: Right Threw: Right

MLB debut
- September 28, 1965, for the Houston Astros

Last MLB appearance
- October 1, 1967, for the Houston Astros

MLB statistics
- Win–loss record: 0–3
- Strikeouts: 22
- Earned run average: 5.06
- Stats at Baseball Reference

Teams
- Houston Astros (1965, 1967)

Bruce Frederick Von Hoff (November 17, 1943 – September 11, 2012) was an American Major League Baseball pitcher. He was born in Oakland, California.

Von Hoff pitched in a total of thirteen games for the Houston Astros in the 1965 and 1967 seasons.

He died at his home in Gulfport, Florida.
