= Rusty Staub =

American baseball player (1944–2018)

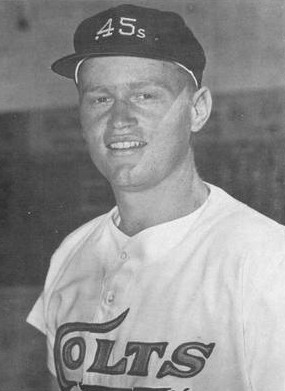
- Staub with the Houston Colt .45s in 1963
- Right fielder / Designated hitter / First baseman
- Born: April 1, 1944; New Orleans, Louisiana, U.S.
- Died: March 29, 2018 (aged 73); West Palm Beach, Florida, U.S.
- Batted: Left Threw: Right

MLB debut
- April 9, 1963, for the Houston Colt .45s

Last MLB appearance
- October 6, 1985, for the New York Mets

MLB statistics
- Batting average: .279
- Hits: 2,716
- Home runs: 292
- Runs batted in: 1,466
- Stats at Baseball Reference

Teams
- Houston Colt .45s / Astros (1963–1968); Montreal Expos (1969–1971); New York Mets (1972–1975); Detroit Tigers (1976–1979); Montreal Expos (1979); Texas Rangers (1980); New York Mets (1981–1985)

Career highlights and awards
- 6× All-Star (1967–1971, 1976); Montreal Expos No. 10 retired; Montreal Expos Hall of Fame; New York Mets Hall of Fame

Member of the Canadian

Baseball Hall of Fame
- Induction: 2012

Daniel Joseph "Rusty" Staub (April 1, 1944 – March 29, 2018) was an American professional baseball player and television color commentator. He played in Major League Baseball for 23 seasons as a right fielder, designated hitter, and first baseman. He was nicknamed "le Grand Orange" by Expos fans.

A six-time All-Star known for his hitting prowess, Staub produced 2,716 hits over his playing career, just 284 hits shy of the 3,000 hit plateau. He was an original member of the Montreal Expos and the team's first star. Although he played just 518 of his 2,951 games as an Expo, his enduring popularity led them to retire his number in 1993, while the Mets inducted him into their team Hall of Fame in 1986.

Staub was also known for his charitable work through the Rusty Staub Foundation, supporting emergency food pantries in New York; and for establishing the New York Police and Fire Widows’ and Children's Benefit Fund.

== Early life ==
Staub was born in New Orleans on April 1, 1944, to Raymond and Alma Staub. He was given the nickname "Rusty" by a nurse in the hospital shortly after he was born because of his red hair. Ray Staub had been a minor league catcher in the Class D Florida State League in 1937–38. Ray gave Rusty a baseball bat at only three years old, and began teaching him how to swing from then on. When Staub was a child, Alma's brother, a New Orleans policeman, was killed in the line of duty. One of his most vivid and affecting memories in life was sitting on his bed with his mother and brother reciting the rosary for his uncle. This would later lead to his charitable work for police and their families.

Staub attended Jesuit High School in New Orleans, where he played first base on the baseball team. In 1961, he had a .474 batting average and led the Jesuit Blue Jays to the Louisiana Class AAA baseball championship, hitting a 400-foot home run to win the deciding championship game. He was selected co-Outstanding Player on the Louisiana Sports Writers Association All-State team. As a basketball player, he helped the Blue Jays reach the playoffs in 1960 and 1961. In 1960, Staub and his brother Chuck led their amateur baseball team to the American Legion World Series championship; and in 1961, Staub hit .553 in American Legion ball.

== Playing career ==
=== Houston Colt .45s/Astros ===
Staub signed his first professional contract with the expansion team Houston Colt .45s organization in 1961. He spent the 1962 season in the Class B Carolina League, and at season's end he was named one of the league's all-stars and its Most Valuable Player. Following that season, Staub was signed to a US$100,000 Major League contract under the Bonus Rule.

Rusty was roommates with Illinois fireballer Rich Aird on the 62 Bulls. In his first season, aged 19, he played regularly, splitting time between first base and the outfield, but hit only .220. He became only the second major league rookie since 1900 to play 150 games as a teenager; the first had been Bob Kennedy, also 19, with the Chicago White Sox in 1940. The following season, he hit only .216 for the Colts and was sent down to the minor leagues at one point. His statistics steadily improved in the 1965 season for his team, which had been renamed the Astros, and he had a breakout 1967 season, when he led the league in doubles with 44 and was selected to the All-Star team. He collected a hit in twenty straight games from June 30 to July 21, making him the first ever Astro with a twenty-game hitting streak; various players have passed him since, starting with Lee May in 1973. He repeated as an All-Star for the Astros in 1968.

=== Montreal Expos ===
1969 photo of Staub posing for the Montreal Expos

Staub did not get along with Harry Walker, hired by the Astros on June 17, 1968, to move from hitting coach to manager. Walker and general manager H.B. "Spec" Richardson (who felt he was not getting the most out of his contract) decided to trade Staub to the Montreal Expos before the start of their inaugural season in 1969 as part of a deal for Donn Clendenon and Jesús Alou. The trade became a source of controversy as Clendenon (who thought Walker was a racist from his playing days with him in Pittsburgh) refused to report to the Astros and attempted to retire; the deal had to be resolved by Commissioner of Baseball Bowie Kuhn who ruled that the deal was official, but that Clendenon was to stay with the Expos. Montreal eventually dealt Jack Billingham, Skip Guinn, and $100,000 as compensation.

Staub was embraced as the expansion team's first star, and became one of the most popular players in their history. Embraced by French Canadians because he learned their language, he was nicknamed "Le Grand Orange" for his red hair (his more common nickname of "Rusty" has the same origin).

In his first year with the Expos, he played in 158 games, having 166 hits, 89 runs, 29 home runs, 79 RBIs on a .302 batting average with a .426 OBP and a .952 OPS. He walked 110 times while striking out 61 times. He played 156 games (with 152 complete games, a career high) in right field for 1,355.1 innings, having 265 putouts, 16 assists, 10 errors, and two double plays turned for a .966 fielding percentage. He was named to the All-Star Game for the third straight year, although he did not play. He finished in the top ten for the National League in numerous categories, such as 10th in batting average, 4th in OBP, total bases (289, 10th), walks (3rd), but also right field categories putouts (2nd), assists and errors (1st).

The following year, he played 160 games while having 156 hits, 98 runs, 30 home runs (a career high) while batting .274 with a .394 OBP and a .891 OPS. He had 112 walks and 93 strikeouts, both career highs. He played 160 games in right field, having 145 complete games in 156 games (a career high) started for a total of 1,374.2 innings. He had 308 putouts, 14 assists, five errors, four double plays and a .985 fielding percentage. He was named to the All-Star Game for the fourth straight year, having a pinch hit appearance in the third inning, going 0-for-1.

For 1971, he played in all 162 games. He had 186 hits, 94 runs, 19 home runs, 97 RBIs with a .311 batting average, a .392 OBP, and a .874 OPS. He had 74 walks and 42 strikeouts. He appeared in 160 games in right field, starting 156 while having 145 complete games for a total of 1,374.2 inning. He had 308 putouts, 14 assists, five errors, and four double plays for a .985 fielding percentage. He was named to the All-Star Game for the fifth straight time, although he did not play.

The #10 worn by Staub during his first stint in Montreal was the first number retired by the Montreal Expos organization. He is also the franchise's career leader in on-base percentage (.402), among players with 2,000 or more plate appearances with the franchise. Staub won the Expos Player of the Year award in the organization's inaugural 1969 season.

In his three full seasons with the team, Staub played in 480 total games, garnering 508 hits and achieving an on-base percentage of .402, the latter of which is a franchise record.

=== New York Mets ===
After three seasons in Montreal, the New York Mets made a blockbuster trade for Staub in 1972 in exchange for first baseman-outfielder Mike Jorgensen, shortstop Tim Foli, and outfielder Ken Singleton. He was batting .313 for the Mets until June 3 of that year, when he was hit by a pitch from future teammate George Stone of the Atlanta Braves, fracturing his right wrist. He played through the pain for several weeks until X-rays revealed the broken bone. Surgery was required, and Staub went on the disabled list, only returning to the line-up on September 18, 1972, having missed 90 games.

To make matters worse, on May 11, 1973, he was hit by a pitch, this time from Ramón Hernández of the Pittsburgh Pirates. (Hernández also hit Jerry Grote in the same game, fracturing his forearm). Despite playing with pain due to the injury, he still led the team in RBIs. In the National League Championship Series against the Cincinnati Reds, Staub hit three home runs and had five runs batted in. Game 4 of the NLCS was noteworthy for Staub making two catches, during the latter of which he crashed into the outfield wall. He made an outstanding play defensively, where he robbed Dan Driessen of an extra-base hit in the 11th inning. But while making the catch in right field, Staub crashed into the fence and separated his right shoulder. This incident was the impetus for Major League teams applying padding on the outfield walls at all ball parks. The injury forced Staub out of the lineup for Game 5. The Mets went on to defeat the heavily favored Reds to win the National League Pennant in 5 games. In the World Series the shoulder injury forced Staub out of Game 1, but he was used as a decoy, waiting on deck to pinch hit. He returned to the lineup for Game 2, but because of his injury Staub had to throw underhanded and weakly for the remainder of the World Series. Despite the injury, he batted .423 against the Oakland Athletics including a home run and six runs batted in. For the 1973 postseason he batted .341 with 4 home runs and 11 runs batted in

In 1974 he had an injury-free season and led the Mets in hits, runs batted in, and at bats. He played in 151 games, having 145 hits, 65 runs, 19 home runs, 78 RBIs with a .258 batting average, a .347 OBP, and a .754 OPS. He had 77 walks and 39 strikeouts. In 147 games in the right field (with 138 complete games), he had 1,292.1 innings while having 262 putouts, 19 assists, with five errors and double plays each for a .983 fielding percentage.

In 1975, he set a Mets record with 105 runs batted in—the first Met player to surpass 100 RBIs—which was not matched until 1986, when it was tied by Gary Carter, and not surpassed until 1990 when Darryl Strawberry recorded 108.

=== Detroit Tigers ===
Staub was traded with Bill Laxton to the Detroit Tigers for Mickey Lolich and Billy Baldwin on December 12, 1975. The transaction was delayed by Lolich who had exercised his right to veto which he earned as a major leaguer for at least ten years with the last five on the same ballclub, a benefit for which Staub had been a year away from qualifying. The trade was lopsided in favor of the Tigers.

In his three plus seasons with the Tigers, Staub hit .277 with 70 home runs and 358 runs batted in. He was voted to start the 1976 All-Star Game, where he went 2-for-2.

In 1978, Staub became the first player to play in all 162 regular-season games exclusively as a designated hitter. Not playing the field at all proved beneficial, as Staub finished second in the Major Leagues with 121 RBI and finished fifth in American League Most Valuable Player voting. He was selected to the Sporting News American League All-Star team at the end of the season as the designated hitter.

Staub held out to start the 1979 season. In the 1979 season, he played for the Tigers in 68 games, getting 246 at-bats with 58 hits, 9 home runs and 40 RBIs on a .236 batting average before being traded to the Montreal Expos on July 20 for a player to be named later and cash, with Randall Schafer being sent to complete the trade. He played in 38 games with the Expos, getting 23 hits along with three home runs and 14 RBIs on a .267 batting average. On March 31, 1980, he was traded to the Texas Rangers for Chris Smith and La Rue Washington.

=== Later career ===
In 1980, Staub played 109 games with the Rangers, with 102 hits in 388 plate appearances while having nine home runs and 55 RBIs for a .300 batting average (which was his first since 1971). He was granted free agency on October 23, 1980, and he signed with the New York Mets on December 16. The Mets immediately reduced him to a part time player and coach, never allowing him to be an everyday player again. Although still a productive hitter, and well on his way to achieving the 3000-hit milestone, he spent the last years of his career mostly sitting on the bench. This ended his ability to be a star player and reaching 3000 hits. But in 1983, he tied a National League record with eight straight pinch-hits and tied the Major League record of 25 RBIs by a pinch hitter. In his final five seasons with the Mets, he played in a combined total of 418 games (with 112 in 1982 being his most), making 702 plate appearances while hitting successfully 169 times and getting 13 home runs and 102 RBIs with a .276 batting average. Although he rarely started a game in his final years as a player, he earned his reputation as the bench pinch hitter of that time. Fittingly, his final game on October 6, 1985, was against the Expos, pinch hitting for Ronn Reynolds in the bottom of the ninth inning. In his last plate appearance, he grounded out to end the game.

== Retirement and honors ==
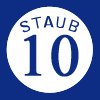
Rusty Staub's number 10 was retired by the Montreal Expos in 1993.

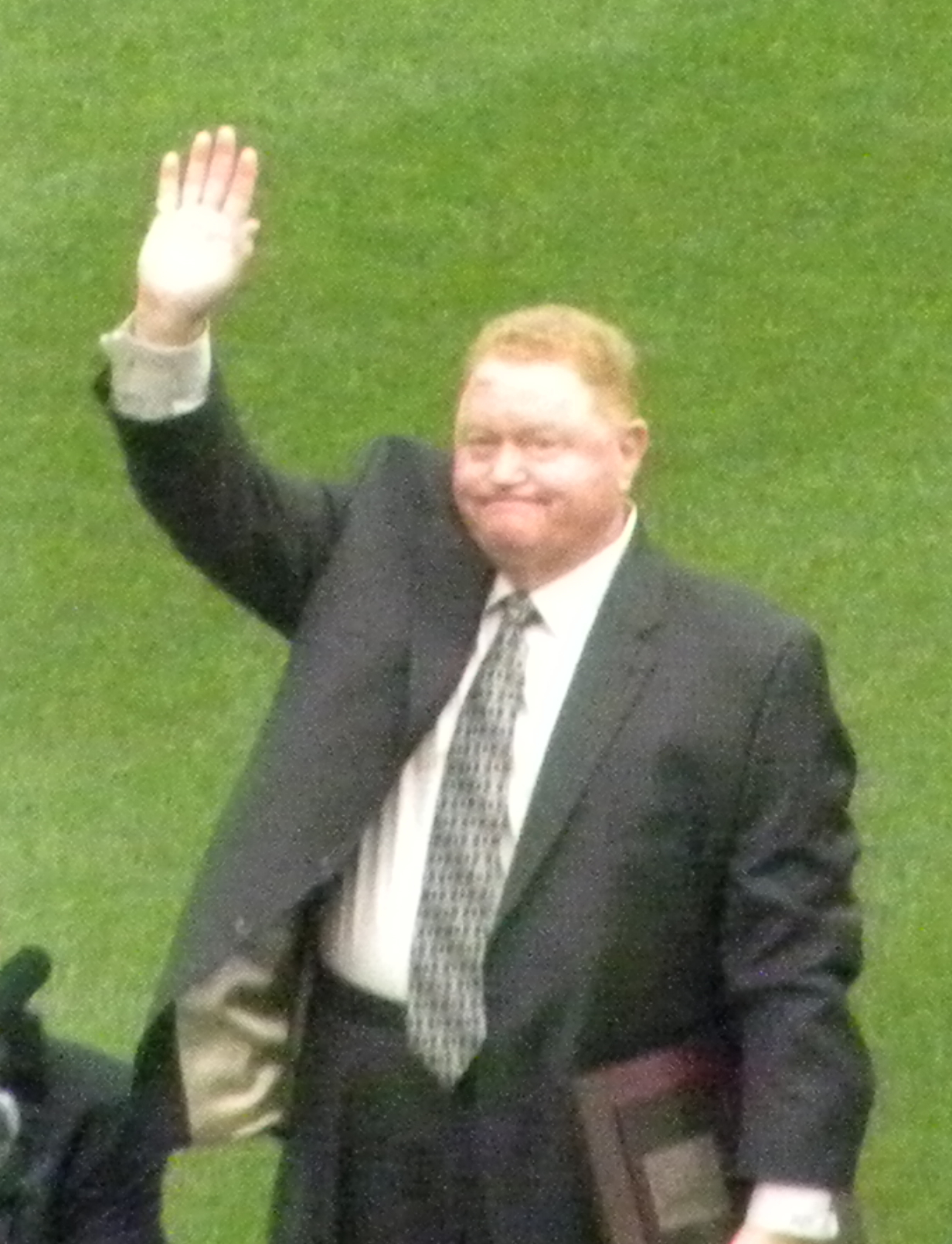
Staub in 2010

Staub's career ended at the age of 41 in 1985. He was only 284 hits shy of the 3,000 hit milestone. He is the only major league player to have 500 hits with four different teams. He, Ty Cobb, Alex Rodriguez and Gary Sheffield share the distinction of being the only players to hit home runs before turning 20 years old, and after turning 40 years old. Staub was on the Hall of Fame ballot for seven years from 1991 to 1997. He never received more than 7.9%, and he dropped off the ballot after receiving 3.8% in 1997.

Staub was inducted into the New York Mets Hall of Fame in 1986; when the Mets won the World Series that year, Staub received a ring from general manager Frank Cashen. In 2004, he received an honorary Doctor of Humane Letters degree from Niagara University. Jesuit High School, where Rusty graduated, annually gives the Rusty Staub Award to the leader of the varsity baseball team. In 2006, Staub was inducted into the Texas Sports Hall of Fame and six years later, in 2012, he was inducted into the Canadian Baseball Hall of Fame. On May 26, 2012, the New York Mets featured a Rusty Staub promotional giveaway bobblehead as part of their 50th anniversary celebration.

On April 4, 1986, Staub established the Rusty Staub Foundation to provide educational scholarships for youth and fight hunger.

In 1985, Staub founded the New York Police and Fire Widows' and Children's Benefit Fund, which supports the families of New York City police officers, firefighters, Port Authority police, and emergency medical personnel who were killed in the line of duty. During its first 15 years of existence, the fund raised and distributed $11 million for families of policemen and firefighters killed in the line of duty. Since September 11, 2001, Staub's organization has received contributions in excess of $112 million, and it has played a vital role in helping many families affected by the attack. Staub lost his close friend, Frank Brennan, a bond trader with Cantor-Fitzgerald, in the attack. Brennan had helped Staub establish the Rusty Staub Foundation.

Staub worked as a television announcer for Mets' ballgames from 1986 to 1995.

Staub owned and ran two restaurants in Manhattan. Rusty's (at 73rd and Third) opened in 1977, and another Rusty's on Fifth opened in 1989. The 73rd Street Rusty's used to have an annual rib-eating contest, won by a very young teenage Brooke Shields in 1981. Both restaurants have since closed.

After his playing career, Staub also served as a goodwill ambassador for the New York Mets and was a vice president for the Major League Baseball Players Alumni Association, serving as the chairman of the annual Legends for Youth Dinner.

In July 2006, Staub teamed with Mascot Books to publish his first children's book, Hello, Mr. Met.

Staub was inducted into the Baseball Reliquary's Shrine of the Eternals in 2018.

== Personal life ==
While with the Expos, Staub dated Candice Laflamme, a local he met while with team, for two years, ending with Staub's trade to the Mets after the 1971 season. Laflamme eventually married, had two children, and had divorced by 1985, determined never to marry again. She remained friends with Staub over the years, into the 1990s. Staub, however, never married, and never had children.

== Illness and death ==
On October 1, 2015, Staub was on a flight from Ireland to the United States when he had a heart attack and went into cardiac arrest. Two doctors were on board, and assisted in resuscitating him. The flight turned around and landed in Shannon Airport, where paramedics continued to administer emergency treatment to Staub, and transported him to University Hospital Limerick.

Staub died on March 29, 2018, opening day of the 2018 baseball season, and three days before his 74th birthday, at the Good Samaritan Medical Center in West Palm Beach, Florida, from multiple organ failure. He had been in the hospital for the previous eight weeks, having been admitted for pneumonia, dehydration, and an infection.

== See also ==
- Houston Astros award winners and league leaders
- List of Major League Baseball career home run leaders
- List of Major League Baseball career hits leaders
- List of Major League Baseball career doubles leaders
- List of Major League Baseball career runs scored leaders
- List of Major League Baseball annual doubles leaders
- List of Major League Baseball career runs batted in leaders
- List of Major League Baseball career total bases leaders
