= Walt Bond =

American baseball player (1937–1967)

- Outfielder / First baseman
- Born: October 19, 1937; Denmark, Tennessee, U.S.
- Died: September 14, 1967 (aged 29); Houston, Texas, U.S.
- Batted: Left Threw: Right

MLB debut
- April 19, 1960, for the Cleveland Indians

Last MLB appearance
- May 7, 1967, for the Minnesota Twins

MLB statistics
- Batting average: .256
- Home runs: 41
- Runs batted in: 179
- Stats at Baseball Reference

Teams
- Cleveland Indians (1960–1962); Houston Colt .45s/Astros (1964–1965); Minnesota Twins (1967)

Walter Franklin Bond (October 19, 1937 – September 14, 1967) was an American professional baseball player who appeared in 365 games over six Major League Baseball seasons between 1960 and 1967 for the Cleveland Indians, Houston Colt .45s/Astros and Minnesota Twins. An outfielder and first baseman, he played the last five seasons of his 11-year professional career after being diagnosed with leukemia while serving as a private first class in the United States Army in 1962. Bond died of the disease in the closing weeks of the 1967 baseball season — a year during which he had made the Twins' roster coming out of spring training.

The native of Denmark, Tennessee, attended Lane College; he stood 6 feet 7 inches (2.01 m) tall and weighed 228 pounds (103 kg), threw right-handed and batted left-handed. With his imposing size, he was an effective power hitter who also batted for average (.299) during his minor league career, and brief Negro leagues career with the Kansas City Monarchs. In 1962, the year of his diagnosis, Bond batted .320 in 132 games for the Salt Lake City Bees of the Triple-A Pacific Coast League. Then, in a 12-game September stint with the Indians, Bond hit six home runs in only 50 at bats, drove in 17 runs, batted .380 and slugged .800. Yet he could not make the 1963 Indians roster and spent that campaign in Triple-A.

On December 19, 1963, he was acquired by Houston. The Colt .45s' general manager, Paul Richards, was aware of Bond's illness, but the team doctor examined Bond and determined his leukemia was in remission. Bond then turned in his best major league season as the starting first baseman for the 1964 Colt .45s, leading Houston in home runs (20) and runs batted in (85), and appearing in 148 games. The following year, Bond held onto his starting job, but his production slumped with the team's move into the Astrodome; some teammates later speculated that his leukemia had recurred that season, affecting his play. Sent to the Twins just before the 1966 season, he returned to Triple-A and batted .316 with 18 home runs in 122 games for the Denver Bears, earning an invitation to spring training for 1967.

Bond made the team and batted .313 in part-time duty during the season's first month. His five hits included a two-run, pinch-hit home run against 20-game-winner Earl Wilson of the Detroit Tigers on April 23. However, the Twins released him on May 15, and although Bond caught on with the Triple-A Jacksonville Suns, his declining health forced him to the sidelines after only three games. He entered a Houston hospital for treatment, and he died there on September 14, 1967, a month short of turning 30. Said his physician, Dr. Hatch Cummings: "He showed the strength of character and will that only champions possess. It was an exhibition of courage, and in the best tradition of baseball." Bond was interred at Houston National Cemetery on September 18, 1967.

Among Bond's 307 big-league hits were 40 doubles, 11 triples and 41 homers. He was credited with 179 runs batted in.

== See also ==
- List of baseball players who died during their careers
