= John Hoffman (baseball) =

American baseball player (1943-2001)

- Catcher
- Born: October 31, 1943; Aberdeen, South Dakota, U.S.
- Died: December 27, 2001 (aged 58); Seattle, Washington, U.S.
- Batted: Left Threw: Right

MLB debut
- July 30, 1964, for the Houston Colt .45s

Last MLB appearance
- October 3, 1965, for the Houston Astros

MLB statistics
- Batting average: .143
- Home runs: 0
- Runs batted in: 1
- Stats at Baseball Reference

Teams
- Houston Colt .45s/Astros (1964–1965)

John Edward Hoffman (October 31, 1943 – December 27, 2001) was an American professional baseball player. He was a catcher whose career lasted seven seasons (1963–1969), including brief stints in Major League Baseball with the 1964–1965 Houston Colt .45s/Astros. Hoffman batted left-handed, threw right-handed, stood 6 feet (1.8 m) tall and weighed 190 pounds (86 kg).

Hoffman was one of several catching prospects (among them John Bateman and Jerry Grote) in the Houston organization of the mid-1960s. He appeared in eight Major League games and collected three hits, all singles, in 21 at bats, plus a base on balls. In the minor leagues, he batted .215 with 604 games played.
