= Dave Roberts (first baseman) =

Panamanian baseball player (1933–2021)

- First baseman
- Born: June 30, 1933; Panama City, Panama
- Died: October 3, 2021 (aged 88); Huntsville, Alabama, U.S.
- Batted: Left Threw: Left

Professional debut
- MLB: September 5, 1962, for the Houston Colt .45s
- NPB: April 8, 1967, for the Sankei Atoms

Last appearance
- MLB: May 11, 1966, for the Pittsburgh Pirates
- NPB: October 10, 1973, for the Kintetsu Buffaloes

MLB statistics
- Batting average: .196
- Home runs: 2
- Runs batted in: 17

NPB statistics
- Batting average: .275
- Home runs: 183
- Runs batted in: 492
- Stats at Baseball Reference

Teams
- Houston Colt .45s (1962, 1964); Pittsburgh Pirates (1966); Sankei/Yakult Atoms (1967–1972); Kintetsu Buffaloes (1973)

David Leonard Roberts (June 30, 1933 – October 3, 2021) was a Panamanian Major League Baseball first baseman who played 22 seasons of professional baseball. Of all professional baseball players whose careers began in 1952 only Hank Aaron had a longer career. Born in Panama City, he threw and batted left-handed, stood 6 feet (1.8 m) tall and weighed 172 pounds (78 kg).

== Minor leagues ==
Roberts started out in class C ball with the Porterville Comets of the Southwest International League in 1952. He was purchased by the St. Louis Browns on October 10, 1953, less than a month before the Browns would officially become the Baltimore Orioles. It was to be the last transaction made in St. Louis Browns franchise history. After a strong 1955 season in Class AA ball playing first base opposite Brooks Robinson at third for the San Antonio Missions in the Texas League, Roberts was demoted back to Class A ball in 1957 when another Texas league team refused to play against any team with black players. He had played ten seasons in the minors before finally getting a shot at the majors with the Houston Colt .45s expansion team in 1962. Roberts ended his American professional baseball career with the Columbus Jets in 1966.

== Major League ==
Roberts' Major League career was uneventful. Between stints with the Oklahoma City 89ers, he collected just 178 at bats with Houston, playing mostly first base, but also some outfield. In 1966, he got one final shot at the majors with the Pittsburgh Pirates, but went just 2-for-16 and was out of the majors for good.

== Japanese leagues ==
In 1967, Roberts made his way to the Sankei Atoms of the Japanese Central League. He made the all star team in 1968 and became the first gaijin to hit 40 home runs. He was an all-star in 1969, 1971 and 1972. In 1971, he set the record for home runs by a gaijin at 183. He played for them until 1973, when he lost his job to the newly signed Joe Pepitone. (Pepitone lasted 14 games. His name came to be used to mean "goof off" in Japanese vernacular). Roberts played one more season for the Kintetsu Buffaloes before retiring.

== See also ==
- American expatriate baseball players in Japan
