= Billy Sorrell =

American baseball player (1940–2008)

Bill Sorrell
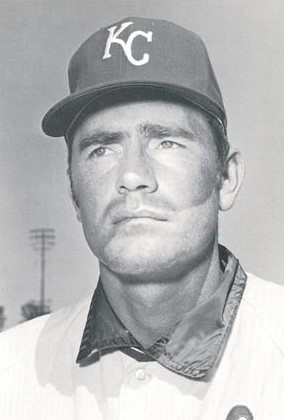
- Third baseman
- Born: October 14, 1940; Morehead, Kentucky, U.S.
- Died: July 22, 2008 (aged 67); Rancho Bernardo, California, U.S.
- Batted: Left Threw: Right

MLB debut
- September 2, 1965, for the Philadelphia Phillies

Last MLB appearance
- October 1, 1970, for the Kansas City Royals

MLB statistics
- Batting average: .267
- Home runs: 5
- Runs batted in: 17
- Stats at Baseball Reference

Teams
- Philadelphia Phillies (1965); San Francisco Giants (1967); Kansas City Royals (1970)

Billy Lee Sorrell (October 14, 1940 – July 22, 2008) was an American professional baseball player who appeared in 85 games over parts of three seasons in Major League Baseball (MLB) for the Philadelphia Phillies (1965), San Francisco Giants (1967) and Kansas City Royals (1970). Primarily a third baseman, Sorrell batted left-handed, threw right-handed, and was listed as 6 feet (1.8 m) tall and 190 pounds (86 kg). He was born in Morehead, Kentucky.

== Baseball career ==
Sorrell signed with the Phillies in 1960 and was recalled to Philadelphia late in the 1965 campaign. He singled as a pinch hitter in his MLB debut September 2 off San Francisco relief pitcher Frank Linzy, and batted .385 with five hits overall in his only trial with the Phillies. Then, in 1966, he was sent to Triple-A San Diego, where he hit 20 home runs. When he was left unprotected by the Phillies after the season, the Giants selected Sorrell in the 1966 Rule 5 Draft. He played sparingly for the 1967 Giants, getting into only 18 games with 21 plate appearances through June 18, before being returned to the Philadelphia organization. He spent two seasons in the New York Mets' system, beginning in 1968, before his contract was purchased by the Royals, an expansion team in its first season, in August 1969. The Royals then gave Sorrell his most extended trial in the majors: 57 games and 145 plate appearances during 1970 between June 2 and the end of that season.

Sorrell played in Triple-A through the end of 1971, then spent two years in Nippon Professional Baseball with the Hankyu Braves, retiring in 1973. In the majors, Sorrell batted .267 lifetime; his 44 hits included three doubles and five home runs, and he was credited with 17 runs batted in. In Japan, he hit .278 with 20 home runs and 75 RBI in 183 games. Sorrell died at age 67 in Rancho Bernardo, California.

Billy's grandson, Caden, was drafted by the Chicago Cubs in the 2nd round (62 overall) of the 2026 MLB Draft.

== 10,000th MLB player ==
Sorrell was the 10,000th player in MLB history. Baseball Reference lists Sorrell, Darrell Osteen, Bud Harrelson and Dick Selma—all of whom made their major league debuts on September 2, 1965—as the major leagues' 9,998th player. The same source notes that Harrelson (9,998) and Selma (9,999) made their debut for the Mets in a game that ended at 4:56 PM; Sorrell (10,000) made his debut as the next-to-last batter in a game in Philadelphia that ended at 6:19 PM; and Osteen (10,001) made his debut for the Cincinnati Reds in a contest that started at 8:05.More recently baseball-reference.com noted that they found six players without known start dates that were added prior to Billy Sorrell's debut so he is now player 10,006. According to baseball-reference.com Andy Kosco, who debuted in August 1965, is player 10,000
