= Don Bradey =

American baseball player (born 1934)

- Pitcher
- Born: October 4, 1934 (age 91); Charlotte, North Carolina, U.S.
- Batted: Right Threw: Right

MLB debut
- September 25, 1964, for the Houston Colt .45s

Last MLB appearance
- October 4, 1964, for the Houston Colt .45s

MLB statistics
- Win–loss record: 0–2
- Earned run average: 19.29
- Strikeouts: 2
- Stats at Baseball Reference

Teams
- Houston Colt .45s (1964)

Donald Eugene Bradey (born October 4, 1934) is an American former professional baseball player. He was a 5 ft 9 in (1.75 m), 180 lb (82 kg) right-handed pitcher who had a 15-year career (1953–1967) in minor league baseball, but who made only three appearances in the Major Leagues for the 1964 Houston Colt .45s.

Bradey had just completed his 12th season in the minor leagues when Houston called him up during September 1964. His first two MLB games were as a relief pitcher, and Bradey surrendered unearned runs in each game. Then, on October 4, 1964, the closing day of the 1964 season (and Bradey's 30th birthday), he started against the Los Angeles Dodgers. He faced only eight batters, recording two outs but giving up four hits, two bases on balls, a wild pitch, two stolen bases and five earned runs. Bradey's final MLB game and only start would be the last game Houston would play as the Colt .45s — the team was renamed the Astros in 1965.

In the minor leagues, Bradey appeared in 616 games and posted a 127–118 win–loss record. He won 19 games for the 1959 New Orleans Pelicans of the Class AA Southern Association.
