= Christian Vázquez =

Puerto Rican baseball player (born 1990)

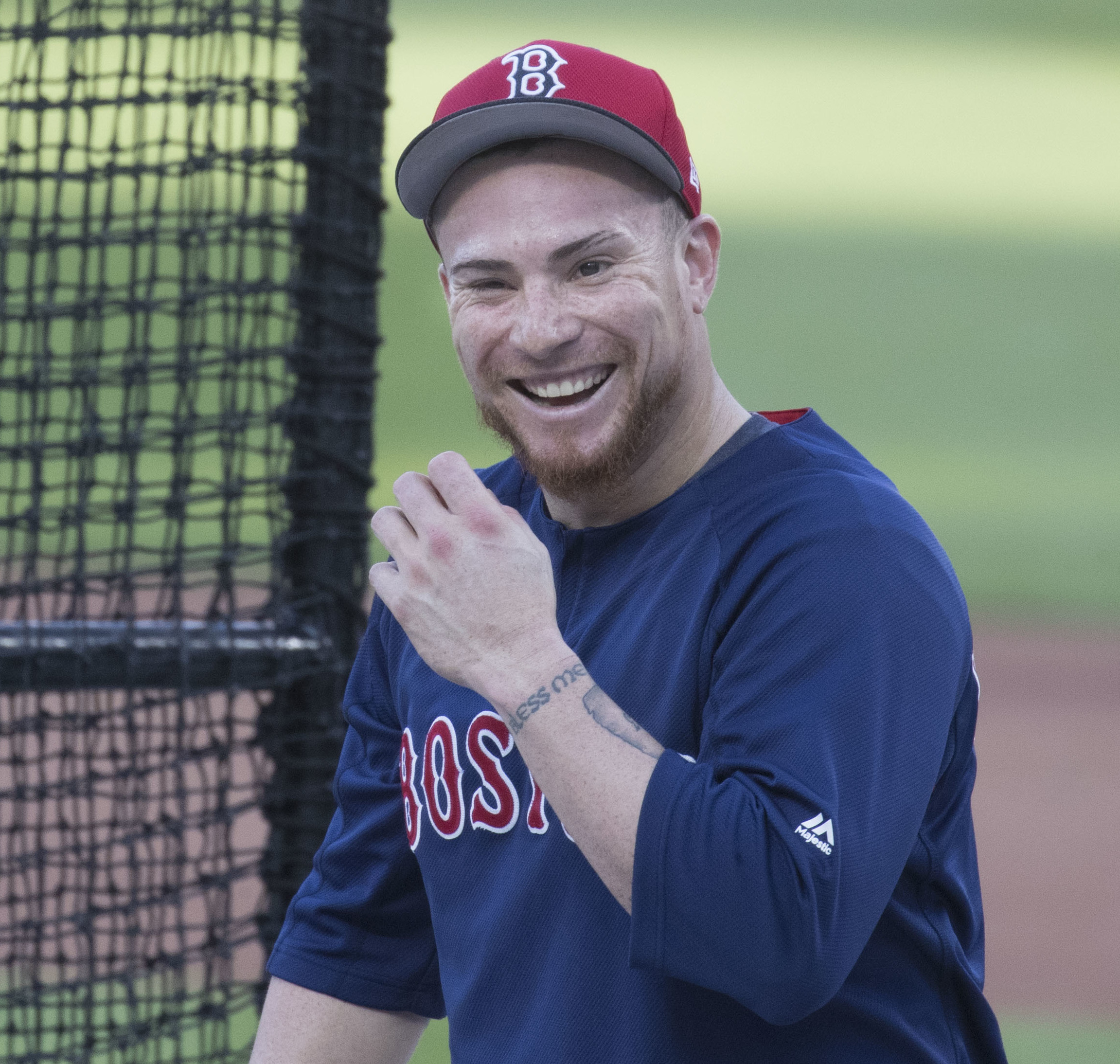
- Vázquez with the Red Sox in 2017

Free agent
- Catcher
- Born: August 21, 1990 (age 36); Bayamón, Puerto Rico
- Bats: Right Throws: Right

MLB debut
- July 9, 2014, for the Boston Red Sox

MLB statistics (through 2026 season)
- Batting average: .247
- Home runs: 78
- Runs batted in: 374
- Stats at Baseball Reference

Teams
- Boston Red Sox (2014, 2016–2022); Houston Astros (2022); Minnesota Twins (2023–2025); Houston Astros (2026)

Career highlights and awards
- 2× World Series champion (2018, 2022)

Christian Rafael Vázquez (born August 21, 1990) is a Puerto Rican professional baseball catcher who is a free agent. He has played in Major League Baseball (MLB) for the Boston Red Sox, Houston Astros, and Minnesota Twins.

Selected by the Red Sox in the ninth round of the 2008 MLB draft, Vázquez made his MLB debut with Boston in 2014, and was a part of their 2018 World Series championship team. He was traded to the Astros in 2022. The Astros won the 2022 World Series with Vázquez, who caught the third no-hitter in postseason history, and second in World Series history, during the series.

== Professional career ==
Vázquez attended the Puerto Rico Baseball Academy and High School, and was selected by the Boston Red Sox in the ninth round of the 2008 MLB draft. His first professional team was the rookie league Gulf Coast Red Sox in 2008 and part of 2009, where he batted 21-for-94 (.223) in 31 games. During 2009, he also played 21 games for the Class A Short Season Lowell Spinners, where he had a .123 average.

Vázquez next played two seasons for the Class A Greenville Drive. In 2010, he batted .263 with three home runs and 32 runs batted in (RBIs) in 79 games. In 2011, he batted .283 with 18 home runs and 84 RBIs in 105 games. In 2012, he batted a combined .254 with seven home runs and 46 RBIs in a total of 101 games for the Class A-Advanced Salem Red Sox and the Double-A Portland Sea Dogs, compiling a .986 fielding percentage while throwing out a 40% of potential base stealers (49-for-122). In 2013, Vázquez played 96 games for Double-A Portland, batting .289 with five home runs and 48 RBIs; he also played a single game for the Triple-A Pawtucket Red Sox, going 0-for-3 at the plate.

In 2014, Vázquez had a slash line of .275/.331/.715 in his first 62 games for Triple-A Pawtucket, and was named to the International League All-Star team. In addition, he was a late addition to the All-Star Futures Game, but was replaced on the roster due to his promotion to the major leagues on July 9.

=== Boston Red Sox ===
==== 2014–2016 ====
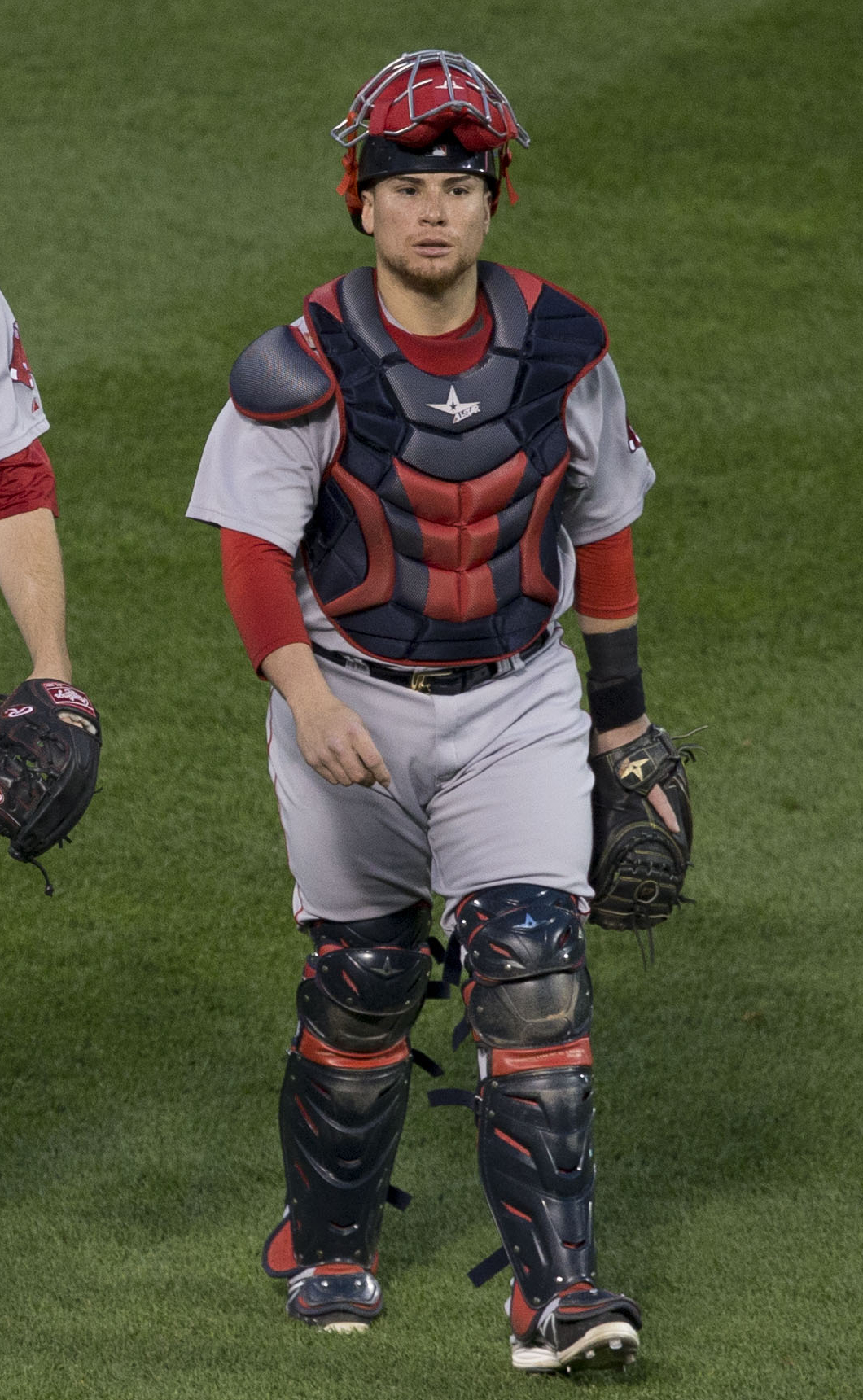
Vázquez in his catcher's gear in 2014

Vázquez made his MLB debut on July 9, starting at catcher against the Chicago White Sox; he was hitless in three at bats, while defensively tagging out a runner at the plate when Alejandro De Aza tried to score from first base on a double by Tyler Flowers. Vázquez recorded his first career hit on July 11, off of the Houston Astros' Scott Feldman; Vázquez had three hits, three RBIs, and scored two runs in the game. His first home run came on September 25, off of Jeremy Hellickson of the Tampa Bay Rays. In 55 games played with the 2014 Red Sox, Vázquez batted .240 with a home run and 20 RBIs.

On April 2, 2015, Vázquez underwent Tommy John surgery and was placed on the 60-day disabled list; he missed the entire season.

Vázquez split time between Boston and Pawtucket during 2016. He played in 42 Triple-A games, batting .270 with two home runs and 16 RBIs. With the 2016 Red Sox, Vázquez played in 57 MLB games, batting .227 with one home run and 12 RBIs.

==== 2017–2019 ====
During the 2017 Red Sox regular season, Vázquez batted .290 with five home runs and 32 RBIs; he also had seven stolen bases. He played in 99 games; 95 as catcher, two as designated hitter, and two as third baseman. In an August 1 game at Fenway Park, Vázquez belted a ninth-inning three-run walk-off home run to beat the Cleveland Indians, 12–10, capping a comeback in what some considered to be the best game of the season. The 2017 American League Division Series was the first postseason appearance for Vázquez. He started two of the series' four games, batting 2-for-6 (.333), as the Red Sox fell to the eventual World Series champions, the Houston Astros.

Vázquez started the season as the primary catcher for the 2018 Red Sox, backed up by Sandy León. On July 8, he was placed on the disabled list due to a right fifth finger fracture. At the time, Vázquez was batting .213 for the season, with three home runs and 14 RBIs. On July 10, it was reported that his injury would require surgery in order to insert a pin, and that he would miss six to eight weeks. Vázquez was sent on a rehabilitation assignments with Double-A Portland on August 27, and Triple-A Pawtucket on August 28. He was activated from the disabled list on September 1. Overall for the regular season, he appeared in 80 games, batting .207 with three home runs and 16 RBIs. In the postseason, Vázquez appeared in 12 games, going 8-for-37 at the plate (.216), as the Red Sox won the World Series in five games over the Los Angeles Dodgers.

Vázquez started the 2019 season as one of two catchers for Boston, along with Blake Swihart, who was later traded. On June 21, Vázquez hit a walk-off two-run home run in the 10th to cap a comeback against the Toronto Blue Jays. Vázquez appeared in a career-high 138 games, batting .276 with 66 runs scored, 26 doubles, 23 home runs and 72 RBIs. He was also a finalist for the Rawlings Gold Glove Award at catcher, leading all catchers in fielding percentage (.999).

==== 2020–2022 ====
During the start-delayed 2020 season, Vázquez was Boston's primary catcher. With the 2020 Red Sox, he batted .283 with seven home runs and 23 RBIs in 47 games. Runners stole a major-league leading 21 bases against him, and he caught nine stealing, and there were a major-league leading 16 wild pitches as he was catching.

Vázquez returned to the Red Sox in 2021 as the team's primary catcher. In 138 games during the regular season, he batted .258 with six home runs and 49 RBIs. He also played in 11 postseason games, batting 9-for-32 (.281), including a 13th-inning walk-off home run in Game 3 of the Division Series against Tampa Bay. On November 7, the team exercised its option on Vázquez for 2022. Vázquez returned as Boston's primary catcher, and through the end of July 2022 he batted .282 with eight home runs and 42 RBIs while appearing in 84 games (78 games at catcher).

=== Houston Astros (2022) ===
On August 1, 2022, the Red Sox traded Vázquez to the Houston Astros for Wilyer Abreu and Enmanuel Valdez. On August 3, Vázquez made his starting debut as an Astro at catcher against Boston. In the August 5 contest versus the Cleveland Guardians, Vázquez tallied his first hit in an Astros uniform. Vázquez tied a career high with four hits versus the Chicago White Sox on August 18 in a 21–5 win that included 25 hits, tied for both second-highest scoring output and most hits in team history. In the seventh inning of the regular season finale on October 5 versus the Philadelphia Phillies, Vázquez homered for his first as an Astro.

In the 2022 regular season between both teams, he batted .274/.315/.399 in 398 at bats, with 9 home runs and 52 RBIs.

During the Astros World Series run, Vázquez had a big 2-run single in Game 3 of the ALCS against the New York Yankees which the Astros won 5–0. He also caught the Astros' combined no-hitter in Game 4 of the World Series, hurled by Cristian Javier, Bryan Abreu, Rafael Montero, and Ryan Pressly. The first combined no-hitter in World Series history, it was the second no-hitter overall in World Series play after Don Larsen's perfect game in 1956, the 15th in Astros' history, and the first of Vázquez' career. In Game 6 of the World Series, Vázquez tacked on an insurance run with an RBI single to make it a 4–1 game and the Astros defeated the Phillies to give Vázquez his second World Series title.

Christian Vázquez pregame in St.Louis, 2025.

Following the World Series, he became a free agent.

=== Minnesota Twins ===
On December 16, 2022, Vázquez signed a three-year, $30 million contract with the Minnesota Twins. He made 102 appearances for Minnesota in his first season with the team, batting .223/.280/.318 with six home runs and 32 RBI.

Vázquez played in 93 games for the Twins in 2024, hitting .221/.248/.327 with seven home runs, 27 RBI, and three stolen bases. He made 65 appearances for Minnesota during the 2025 season, slashing .189/.271/.274 with three home runs and 14 RBI.

=== Houston Astros (second stint) ===
On March 7, 2026, Vázquez signed a minor league contract to return to the Houston Astros organization. On March 25, the Astros selected Vázquez's contract after he made the team's Opening Day roster. On May 15, he caught his second no-hitter, pitched by Tatsuya Imai, Steven Okert, and Alimber Santa. Vázquez had two hits and an RBI in a 9–0 win over the Texas Rangers. Vázquez appeared in 86 games, slashing .207/.261/.322/.583, 7 home runs and 25 RBI.

== Personal life ==
Vázquez credits his development as a catcher in part to the Molina brothers (Yadier, Jose, and Bengie), who have all played in MLB.

Vázquez and his wife, Gabriela, married in 2018.

== See also ==
- List of Houston Astros no-hitters
- List of Major League Baseball no-hitters
- List of Major League Baseball players from Puerto Rico
