= List of Houston Astros no-hitters =

The Houston Astros (formerly known as the Houston Colt .45s from 1962–1964) are a Major League Baseball franchise based in Houston, Texas. Formed in 1962, they play in the American League West division (formerly in the National League Central division until 2012). Pitchers for the Astros have thrown eighteen no-hitters in franchise history, the most of all of MLB's expansion teams added since 1961. A no-hitter is officially recognized by Major League Baseball only "when a pitcher (or pitchers) allows no hits during the entire course of a game, which consists of at least nine innings", though one or more batters "may reach base via a walk, an error, a hit by pitch, a passed ball or wild pitch on strike three, or catcher's interference". No-hitters of less than nine complete innings were previously recognized by the league as official; however, several rule alterations in 1991 changed the rule to its current form. No perfect games, a special subcategory of no-hitter, have been thrown in Astros history. As defined by Major League Baseball, "in a perfect game, no batter reaches any base during the course of the game."

Don Nottebart threw the first no-hitter in Astros history on May 17, 1963; the most recent no-hitter was thrown by Tatsuya Imai, Steven Okert and Alimber Santa on May 25, 2026. Only 1 left-handed starting pitcher (Framber Valdez) has thrown a no-hitter in franchise history. The longest interval between no-hitters was 12 years, 2 months and 10 days from the combined no-hitter led by Roy Oswalt on June 11, 2003, and that thrown by Fiers on August 21, 2015. The shortest interval was just 29 days from the combined no-hitter led by Sanchez on August 3, 2019, and Verlander's no-hitter on September 1. They no-hit the Cincinnati Reds, the Los Angeles Dodgers, the New York Yankees, the Philadelphia Phillies, and the Toronto Blue Jays the most, which occurred twice. There are three no-hitters in which the team allowed at least a run, by Nottebart in 1963, Johnson in 1964 (which was a 9-inning home loss), and Kile in 1993. The most baserunners allowed in a no-hitter was by Wilson (in 1969), who allowed eight. Twelve no-hitters were thrown at home, and seven on the road. The Astros have thrown three no-hitters in April, three in May, three in June, one in July, three in August, four in September, and one in November. Of the eighteen no-hitters, four have been won by a score of 2–0, more common than any other result. The largest margin of victory in a no-hitter was a 10–0 win by Blanco in 2024. The smallest margin of victory was 2–0 wins by Wilson in 1967, Mike Scott in 1986, Verlander in 2019, and Valdez in 2023.

Jose Altuve holds the modern-day record of most no-hitters participated in with one team at eight.

The umpire is also an integral part of any no-hitter. The task of the umpire in a baseball game is to make any decision “which involves judgment, such as, but not limited to, whether a batted ball is fair or foul, whether a pitch is a strike or a ball, or whether a runner is safe or out… [the umpire’s judgment on such matters] is final.” Part of the duties of the umpire making calls at home plate includes defining the strike zone, which "is defined as that area over homeplate (sic) the upper limit of which is a horizontal line at the midpoint between the top of the shoulders and the top of the uniform pants, and the lower level is a line at the hollow beneath the kneecap." These calls define every baseball game and are therefore integral to the completion of any no-hitter. A different umpire presided over each of the franchise’s seventeen no-hitters.

The manager is another integral part of any no-hitter. The tasks of the manager include determining the starting rotation as well as batting order and defensive lineup every game. Nine different managers have been involved in the franchise’s eighteen no-hitters.

== List of no-hitters in Astros history ==
Table legend
¶	Indicates a perfect game
§	Indicates game pitched in the postseason
^	Houston Colt .45s/Astros lost the game
£	Pitcher was left-handed
†	Game in which pitcher made major league debut
*	Member of the National Baseball Hall of Fame and Museum

#	Date	Pitcher(s)	Score	BR	Opponent	Catcher	Plate umpire	Notes	Box
1	May 17, 1963	Don Nottebart	4–1	4	Philadelphia Phillies	John Bateman	Ed Vargo	First no-hitter in franchise history; First Astros no-hitter at home; First right-handed pitcher to throw a no-hitter in franchise history; First Astros no-hitter while allowing a run	
2	April 23, 1964	Ken Johnson	0–1^{^}	4	Cincinnati Reds	Jerry Grote	Augie Donatelli	9-inning home loss; First and so far only pitcher to lose a complete game nine-inning no-hitter	
3	June 18, 1967	Don Wilson (1)	2–0	3	Atlanta Braves	Dave Adlesh	Bill Williams	Smallest margin of victory in an Astros no-hitter (tie); First no-hitter thrown at the Astrodome	
4	May 1, 1969	Don Wilson (2)	4–0	8	@ Cincinnati Reds	Don Bryant	Satch Davidson	First Astros no-hitter on the road; Most baserunners allowed in an Astros no-hitter; Second game of a two-game series, in which both were no-hitters	
5	July 9, 1976	Larry Dierker	6–0	4	Montreal Expos	Ed Herrmann	John McSherry	First no-hitter thrown against the Montreal Expos	
6	April 7, 1979	Ken Forsch	6–0	2	Atlanta Braves	Alan Ashby (1)	Murray Strey	Game 2 of season; Ken and Bob Forsch are the only set of brothers to have thrown no-hitters	
7	September 26, 1981	Nolan Ryan*	5–0	3	Los Angeles Dodgers	Alan Ashby (2)	Bruce Froemming	5th of 7 no-hitters for Ryan; Broke Sandy Koufax's old record of no-hitters; The Dodgers would go on to win the 1981 World Series	
8	September 25, 1986	Mike Scott	2–0	3	San Francisco Giants	Alan Ashby ^{(3)}	Bob Engel	Smallest margin of victory in a franchise’s no-hitter (tie); Houston clinched NL West title	
9	September 8, 1993	Darryl Kile	7–1	1	New York Mets	Scott Servais	Ed Montague	Final no-hitter thrown at the Astrodome; Mets had their only baserunner scored on a wild pitch, but had no other baserunners.	
10	June 11, 2003	Roy Oswalt (1 IP); Peter Munro (2.2 IP); Kirk Saarloos (1.1 IP); Brad Lidge (2 IP); Octavio Dotel (1 IP); Billy Wagner^{£}* (1 IP)	8–0	6	@ New York Yankees	Brad Ausmus	Mike Fichter	Oswalt left with an injury in the second inning; Equal most pitchers to throw a combined no-hitter in MLB history; Dotel was first to strike out four batters in one inning during no-hitter; First interleague no-hitter thrown by away team; Final no-hitter thrown at the original Yankee Stadium; Final no-hitter for the Astros as a National League team	
11	August 21, 2015	Mike Fiers	3–0	3	Los Angeles Dodgers	Jason Castro	John Tumpane	First no-hitter for the Astros as an American League team; Longest interval between no-hitters in franchise history; 134 pitches with a swinging strikeout to end the game.; Astros acquired Fiers in a trade 23 days earlier making only his third start for the club.; Fiers’ first complete game ever; first time pitching in the 9th inning.; First no-hitter thrown at Minute Maid Park.	
12	August 3, 2019	Aaron Sanchez (6 IP); Will Harris (1 IP); Joe Biagini (1 IP); Chris Devenski (1 IP)	9–0	4	Seattle Mariners	Martín Maldonado	Jim Wolf	Astros acquired Sanchez and Biagini in a trade three days earlier and they were both making their first appearances with the team.	
13	September 1, 2019	Justin Verlander	2–0	1	@ Toronto Blue Jays	Robinson Chirinos	Paul Emmel	3rd no-hitter of Justin Verlander's career; 2019 is the first season with multiple no-hitters by Astros pitchers; The lone Blue Jay to reach base, second basemen Cavan Biggio, is the son of Craig Biggio, who spent his entire Hall of Fame career with the Astros and has worked in the team’s front office ever since his retirement as a player	
14	June 25, 2022	Cristian Javier (7 IP); Héctor Neris (1 IP); Ryan Pressly (1 IP)	3–0	4	@ New York Yankees	Martín Maldonado (2)	Alex Tosi	First no-hitter at the new Yankee Stadium; 2nd time Yankees had been no-hit since 1958 (both times were by the Astros); 2nd time Astros have thrown a combined no-hitter against the Yankees (first one was in 2003 at Yankee Stadium I)	
15	November 2, 2022	Cristian Javier (6 IP); Bryan Abreu (1 IP); Rafael Montero (1 IP); Ryan Pressly (1 IP)	5–0^{§}	3	@ Philadelphia Phillies	Christian Vázquez	Tripp Gibson	Game 4 of the 2022 World Series; First postseason no-hitter in franchise history; 3rd postseason no-hitter in MLB history; 2nd no-hitter in World Series history; First postseason combined no-hitter in MLB history; Latest calendar date of a no-hitter in MLB history	
16	August 1, 2023	Framber Valdez^{£}	2–0	1	Cleveland Guardians	Martín Maldonado (3)	Quinn Wolcott	First left-handed pitcher to throw a no-hitter in franchise history; Faced the minimum 27 batters, the first Astro to do so in a no-hitter	
17	April 1, 2024	Ronel Blanco	10–0	2	Toronto Blue Jays	Yainer Díaz	Charlie Ramos	Largest margin of victory in a no-hitter in franchise history.; First career no-hitter and complete game for Ronel Blanco; Earliest calendar date of a no-hitter in MLB history; First career managerial win for manager Joe Espada. Espada was the first manager in MLB history to get his first managerial win via a no-hitter.	
18	May 25, 2026	Tatsuya Imai (6 IP); Steven Okert^{£} (1 IP); Alimber Santa^{†} (2 IP)	9–0	2	Texas Rangers	Christian Vázquez (2)	Paul Clemons	Game was played on Memorial Day.; Alimber Santa joins Bumpus Jones as the only two pitchers to make their major league debuts during a no-hitter.; The final out of the game, a strikeout looking to Brandon Nimmo, was Santa's first career strikeout.; First no-hitter in MLB history to be won on an Automatic Balls and Strikes (ABS) challenge.	

== See also ==
- List of Major League Baseball no-hitters
