= Shota Imanaga =

Japanese baseball player (born 1993)

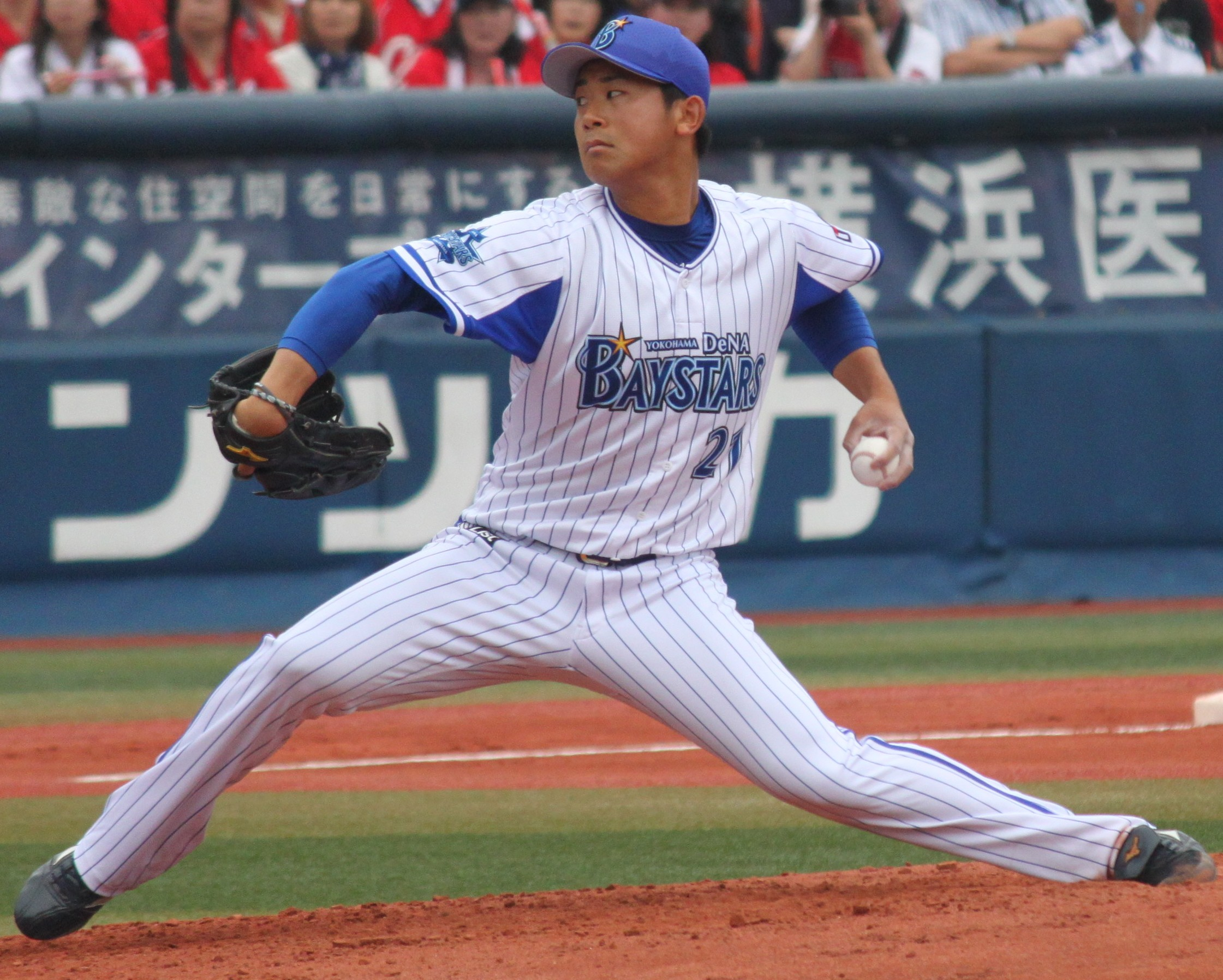
- Imanaga with the Yokohama DeNA BayStars in 2016

Free agent
- Pitcher
- Born: September 1, 1993 (age 33); Kitakyushu, Fukuoka, Japan
- Bats: Left Throws: Left

Professional debut
- NPB: March 29, 2016, for the Yokohama DeNA BayStars
- MLB: April 1, 2024, for the Chicago Cubs

NPB statistics (through 2023 season)
- Win–loss record: 64–50
- Earned run average: 3.18
- Strikeouts: 1,021

MLB statistics (through 2026 season)
- Win–loss record: 35–21
- Earned run average: 3.45
- Strikeouts: 465
- Stats at Baseball Reference

Teams
- Yokohama DeNA BayStars (2016–2023); Chicago Cubs (2024–2026)

Career highlights and awards
- NPB: 2× NPB All-Star (2019, 2023); Central League strikeout champion (2023); Pitched a no-hitter on June 7, 2022; MLB: All-Star (2024); Pitched a combined no-hitter on September 4, 2024
Medals
Men's baseball
Representing Japan
World Baseball Classic
Gold medal – first place	2023 Miami	Team
WBSC Premier12
Gold medal – first place	2019 Tokyo	Team

Shōta Imanaga (今永 昇太, Imanaga Shōta; born September 1, 1993), nicknamed "the Throwing Philosopher", and "Mike Imanaga II" is a Japanese professional baseball pitcher who is a free agent. He has played in Major League Baseball (MLB) for the Chicago Cubs and in Nippon Professional Baseball (NPB) for the Yokohama DeNA BayStars from 2016 to 2023. Imanaga is a two-time NPB All-Star and he led the Central League in strikeouts in 2023 before signing with the Cubs during the 2023–24 offseason. In his first season as a Cub, Imanaga was an All-Star.

On September 4, 2024, Imanaga pitched a combined no-hitter with relief pitchers Nate Pearson and Porter Hodge. The game, which was against the Pittsburgh Pirates at Wrigley Field, was the first no-hitter to be thrown at Wrigley by the Cubs since Milt Pappas no-hit the San Diego Padres in Chicago 52 years and 2 days prior, on September 2, 1972.

== Career ==
=== Yokohama DeNA BayStars ===
The Yokohama DeNA BayStars selected Imanaga in the first round of the 2015 NPB draft out of Komazawa University.

Imanaga signed with the Canberra Cavalry of the Australian Baseball League to play weeks 2–7 of the 2018–19 Australian Baseball League season In his six starts for the Cavalry, he posted a 4–0 win–loss record with a league-best 0.51 earned run average (ERA) over 35 innings pitched with 57 strikeouts to one walk. By meeting the statistical recognition minimum (0.8IP per team game), Imanaga broke the league records for WHIP (0.429), H/9 (3.6), BB/9 (0.3) and second-best ERA behind Ryan Searle. Following his ABL stint, Imanaga posted a 13–7 2.91 ERA, 2019 Nippon Professional Baseball season, finishing second in wins and strikeouts only behind Shun Yamaguchi in the Central League.

On June 7, 2022, Imanaga pitched a no-hitter against the Hokkaido Nippon-Ham Fighters. He struck out nine and allowed one walk over 117 pitches.

On September 6, 2023, Yokohama announced that they would post Imanaga to Major League Baseball (MLB) following the 2023 season.

=== Chicago Cubs ===
==== 2024 ====
On January 11, 2024, Imanaga signed a four-year, $53 million contract with the Chicago Cubs that also contained a fifth-year option. The Cubs also had to pay $9.825 million to the Bay Stars in the form of a release fee.

Imanaga pitched six shutout innings allowing just two hits with nine strikeouts in his first start for the Cubs on April 1, 2024. Through his first nine MLB starts, Imanaga compiled a 5-0 record with a then-league-leading 0.84 ERA.

On September 4, Imanaga delivered the first seven innings of a combined no-hitter and 12–0 win over the Pittsburgh Pirates. Nate Pearson and Porter Hodge both followed with one inning each. It was the 18th no-hitter and the second combined no-hitter in Cubs franchise history. Additionally, it was the first no-hitter at Wrigley Field since 1972 when Milt Pappas last threw a no-hitter there.

==== 2025 ====
Imanaga started for the Cubs on opening day in 2025 against the Los Angeles Dodgers in the MLB Tokyo Series. In the game, Imanaga pitched four scoreless innings, allowing zero hits, and striking out two batters but got a no decision as the Cubs lost to the Dodgers in the game. He made 25 starts for Chicago, posting a 9-8 record and 3.73 ERA with 117 strikeouts across 144 2/3 innings pitched.

While the majority of Imanaga's following originates from Japan, many fans across the United States (particularly Chicago Cubs supporters) have embraced his precise pitching style. Both at Wrigley Field and via social media, Imanaga has cultivated a passionate international fan base. One particularly viral phenomenon among Chicago fans was the “Shota Boys,” a group of shirtless fans in the bleachers, which originated during his first games with the Cubs early in the season.

On November 4, 2025, the Cubs declined his three-year club option and Imanaga became a free agent. However, on November 18, he accepted the $22 million qualifying offer to remain with the Cubs for another season.

== International career ==
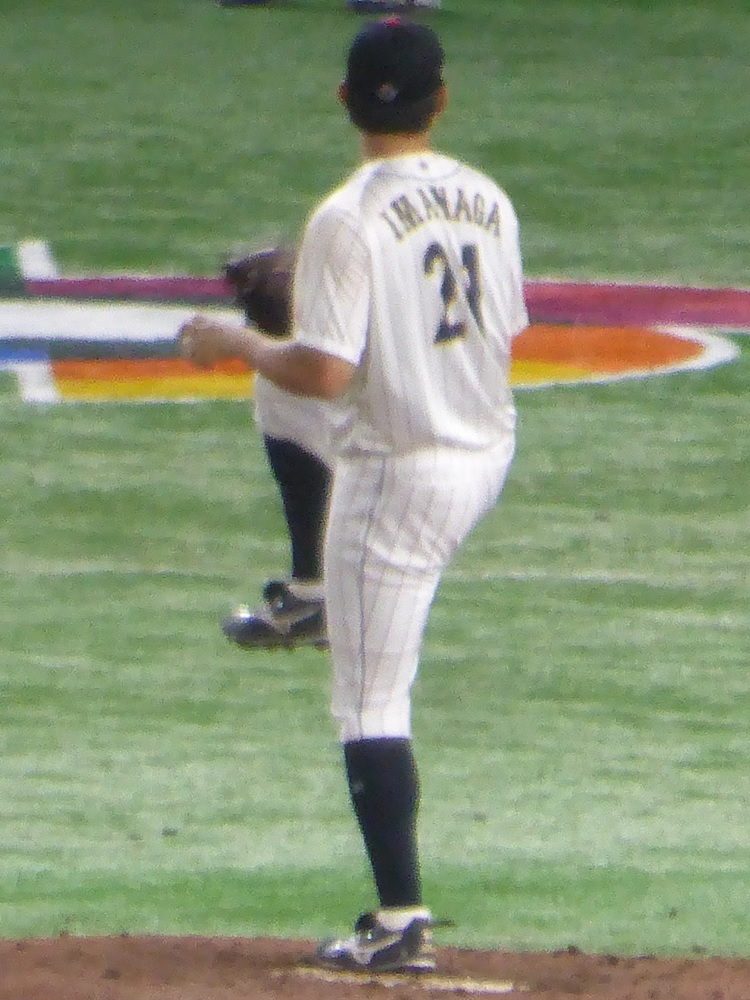
Imanaga with the WBC Japan national team at Tokyo Dome on March 16, 2023

Imanaga represented the Japan national baseball team in the 2019 exhibition games against Mexico and 2019 WBSC Premier12.

Imanaga played for the Japanese national team at the 2023 World Baseball Classic, and started the championship game in which Japan won 3–2.

== Playing style ==
Imanaga is a 5-foot-10-inch (1.78 m), 175-pound (79 kg) left-handed pitcher throwing from a three-quarters arm angle. He has a fastball averaging nearly 92 mph (tops out at 96 mph), changeup, curveball and slider in his repertoire. He is not an overpowering hurler but finds success with his command and changeup.

== Personal life ==
When asked by a reporter about receiving the nickname "the Throwing Philosopher," Imanaga replied (through an interpreter) "I know that I have a unique personality. If I'm trying to say a normal thing, it comes out a little sophisticated." Prior to starting his MLB career, he said at a press conference (through an interpreter), "I am by no means a finished product and there is a lot [for] me to learn, and there is a lot for me to study day-in and day-out. And I believe that, somehow, my approach in that way earned me the nickname."

When asked how he felt pitching in New York for the first time, Imanaga replied (through an interpreter) "The view from the hotel, I recognize it from Spider-Man. So I was just like, oh, this is where Spider-Man was."

Imanaga nicknamed himself "Mike" because of the difficulty baristas at Starbucks had pronouncing his name. The nameplate on his locker was changed to read "Mike Imanaga II"; the "II", according to Imanaga, "just sounds cool".

Awards and achievements
Preceded by Blake Snell	No-hit game September 4, 2024 (with Pearson & Hodge)	Succeeded by Tatsuya Imai; Steven Okert; Alimber Santa
