= Nate Pearson =

American baseball player (born 1996)

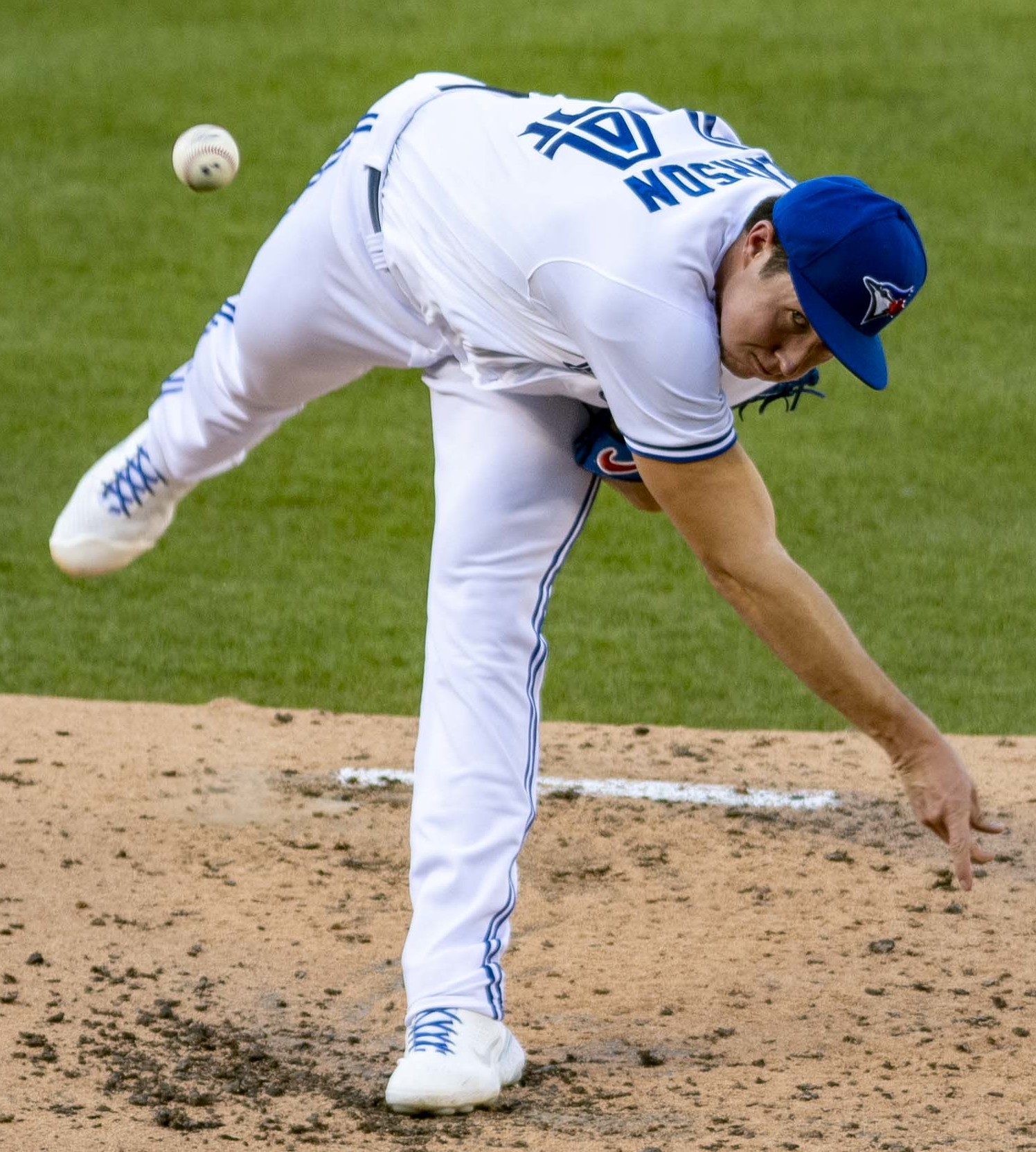
- Pearson with the Toronto Blue Jays in 2020

Kansas City Royals – No. 61
- Pitcher
- Born: August 20, 1996 (age 30); Odessa, Florida, U.S.
- Bats: Right Throws: Right

MLB debut
- July 29, 2020, for the Toronto Blue Jays

MLB statistics (through 2026 season)
- Win–loss record: 12–10
- Earned run average: 4.93
- Strikeouts: 201
- Stats at Baseball Reference

Teams
- Toronto Blue Jays (2020–2021, 2023–2024); Chicago Cubs (2024–2025); Houston Astros (2026); Kansas City Royals (2026–present)

Career highlights and awards
- Pitched a combined no-hitter on September 4, 2024

Nathan Alexander Pearson (born August 20, 1996) is an American professional baseball pitcher for the Kansas City Royals of Major League Baseball (MLB). He has previously played in MLB for the Toronto Blue Jays, Chicago Cubs, and Houston Astros. Pearson made his MLB debut in 2020 with the Blue Jays, and they traded him to the Cubs during the 2024 season.

== Amateur career ==
Pearson attended Bishop McLaughlin Catholic High School in Spring Hill, Florida. As a senior he went 9–1 with a 1.75 earned run average (ERA) and 117 strikeouts and hit .318 with nine home runs and 30 runs batted in (RBI). After graduating, Pearson attended Florida International University (FIU) where he played college baseball for the FIU Panthers. He made 19 appearances with one start, going 1–1 with a 2.70 ERA and 33 strikeouts. After one year at FIU, he transferred to the College of Central Florida. In his first year at Central Florida, he had a 1.56 ERA and 118 strikeouts and was named the JUCO Pitcher of the Year by Perfect Game.

== Professional career ==
=== Toronto Blue Jays ===
==== Minor leagues ====
Pearson was considered one of the top prospects for the 2017 Major League Baseball draft. He was selected 28th overall by the Toronto Blue Jays, and signed on June 28 for a $2.45 million bonus. Pearson was assigned to the Rookie-level Gulf Coast League Blue Jays, and promoted to the Low–A Vancouver Canadians after making one start. Through his first six starts, Pearson did not allow a run, and yielded only four hits and one walk while striking out 16 in 13 total innings. He finished the 2017 regular season with a 0.90 ERA, 26 strikeouts, and a 0.60 WHIP in 20 innings pitched. In early September, Pearson was selected by Vancouver as the starter for the first game of their best-of-three Northwest League playoff series against the Spokane Indians. He went four innings against Spokane and struck out 10 batters in a 2–1 win.

Pearson was assigned to the High–A Dunedin Blue Jays to begin the 2018 season, but opened the year on the disabled list with an oblique injury. He made his Florida State League debut on May 7, but left the game after being struck by a line drive in the second inning. The following day, the team announced Pearson had suffered a broken ulna in his right arm. He remained on the disabled list for the rest of the 2018 season, and played for the Surprise Saguaros of the Arizona Fall League during the offseason. Pearson began 2019 with Dunedin, where he posted a 3–0 record, 0.86 ERA, and 35 strikeouts in 21 innings pitched before being promoted to the Double-A New Hampshire Fisher Cats in early May. He made his Double-A debut on May 7, striking out eight over five scoreless innings. Pearson was named to the 2019 All-Star Futures Game. Pearson was assigned to Triple-A Buffalo on May 3, 2021.

==== Major leagues ====
On July 29, 2020, Pearson made his MLB debut against Max Scherzer and the Washington Nationals. The game was played in Washington despite being a home game for the Blue Jays, as the COVID-19 pandemic had forced the Blue Jays into Sahlen Field in Buffalo, which was not ready for use. He went five innings, giving up two hits and two walks with five strikeouts, and surrendered no runs in his debut, though the Nationals won 4–0. With the 2020 Toronto Blue Jays, Pearson appeared in 5 games, compiling a 1–0 record with 6.00 ERA and 16 strikeouts in 18 innings pitched.

Pearson made 12 appearances for Toronto in 2021, posting a 1–1 record and 4.20 ERA with 20 strikeouts in 15.0 innings pitched. On June 6, 2022, Pearson was placed on the 60-day injured list. On June 24, Pearson was diagnosed with a lat strain. He did not appear in the major leagues for Toronto in 2022.

Pearson was optioned to the Triple-A Buffalo Bisons to begin the 2023 season, and pitched out of the bullpen. In 8 1/3 innings, Pearson recorded a 2.16 ERA and 16 strikeouts. On April 24, he was recalled to the major leagues. He made 35 appearances for the Blue Jays in 2023, posting a 5–2 record and 4.85 ERA with 43 strikeouts over 42 2/3 innings of work.

Pearson made 41 relief outings for Toronto in 2024, recording a 5.63 ERA with 51 strikeouts and two saves across 40 innings pitched.

=== Chicago Cubs ===
On July 27, 2024, the Blue Jays traded Pearson to the Chicago Cubs in exchange for Josh Rivera and Yohendrick Piñango. On September 4, Pearson pitched the 8th inning in a combined no-hitter (also featuring Shota Imanaga and Porter Hodge) against the Pittsburgh Pirates, the 4th of the season. He made 19 appearances down the stretch for Chicago, logging a 2-1 record and 2.73 ERA with 23 strikeouts across 26 1/3 innings pitched.

Pearson made 11 appearances for Chicago in 2025, but struggled to an 0-1 record and 9.20 ERA with seven strikeouts across 14 2/3 innings pitched. Pearson was designated for assignment by the Cubs on September 20, 2025. He was released by Chicago the following day.

=== Houston Astros ===
On October 21, 2025, Pearson signed a one-year, $1.35 million contract with the Houston Astros. Pearson made 16 appearances for Houston in 2026, compiling a 1–0 record and 3.60 ERA with 16 strikeouts and one save across 20 innings pitched. He was designated for assignment by the Astros on July 19.

=== Kansas City Royals ===
On July 22, 2026, Pearson was traded to the Kansas City Royals in exchange for Max Martin.

Awards and achievements
Preceded by Blake Snell	No-hit game September 4, 2024 (with Imanaga & Hodge)	Succeeded by Tatsuya Imai; Steven Okert; Alimber Santa
