= Porter Hodge =

American baseball player (born 2001)

Chicago Cubs – No. 37
- Pitcher
- Born: February 21, 2001 (age 25); Salt Lake City, Utah, U.S.
- Bats: Right Throws: Right

MLB debut
- May 22, 2024, for the Chicago Cubs

MLB statistics (through 2025 season)
- Win–loss record: 5–3
- Earned run average: 3.79
- Strikeouts: 92
- Stats at Baseball Reference

Teams
- Chicago Cubs (2024–2025)

Career highlights and awards
- Pitched a combined no-hitter on September 4, 2024

Porter Dene Hodge (born February 21, 2001) is an American professional baseball pitcher for the Chicago Cubs of Major League Baseball (MLB). He made his MLB debut in 2024.

== Early life and education ==
Hodge attended Cottonwood High School in Murray, Utah.

== Baseball career ==
Hodge was drafted by the Chicago Cubs in the 13th round of the 2019 Major League Baseball draft. He made his professional debut that year with the Arizona League Cubs.

Hodge did not play in a game in 2020 due to the cancellation of the minor league season because of the COVID-19 pandemic. He returned in 2021 to play for the Arizona Complex League Cubs and Myrtle Beach Pelicans. Hodge pitched 2022 with Myrtle Beach and the South Bend Cubs. He started 2023 with the Tennessee Smokies.

On November 14, 2023, the Cubs added Hodge to their 40-man roster to protect him from the Rule 5 draft. He was optioned to Double–A Tennessee to begin the 2024 season. On May 17, 2024, Hodge was promoted to the major leagues for the first time. Hodge made his major league debut on May 22, striking out the side in the ninth inning of a loss to the Atlanta Braves. He was one pitch away from an immaculate inning. On September 4, Hodge was part of a combined no-hitter against the Pittsburgh Pirates (along with Shota Imanaga and Nate Pearson), closing out the game in nine pitches and finishing the 4th no-hitter of the year.

In 2025, Hodge pitched in 15 games for the Triple-A Iowa Cubs, and in 36 games for the Chicago Cubs. He had two stints on the injured list and finished the year with a 2-2 record and 6.27 ERA for the Chicago Cubs.

In February 2026, Hodge was shut down due to a right flexor strain suffered in spring training. On April 21, 2026, Hodge underwent season-ending surgery to repair the ulnar collateral ligament in his pitching elbow.

Awards and achievements
| Preceded by Blake Snell | No-hit game September 4, 2024 (with Imanaga & Pearson) | Succeeded by Tatsuya Imai; Steven Okert; Alimber Santa |
