= Alimber Santa =

Dominican baseball player (born 2003)

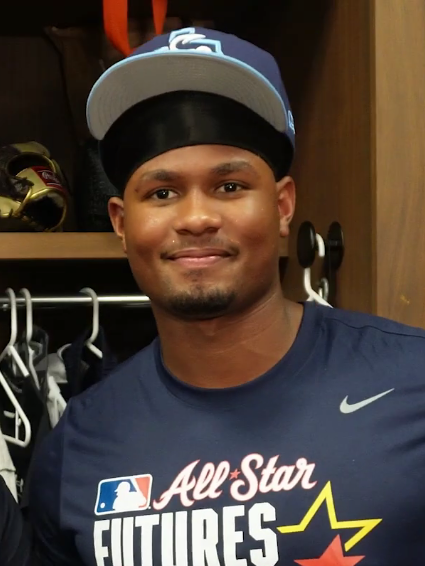
- Santa at the 2025 All-Star Futures Game

Houston Astros – No. 72
- Pitcher
- Born: May 3, 2003 (age 23); Azua, Dominican Republic
- Bats: Right Throws: Right

MLB debut
- May 25, 2026, for the Houston Astros

MLB statistics (through 2026 season)
- Win–loss record: 0–1
- Earned run average: 1.17
- Strikeouts: 9
- Stats at Baseball Reference

Teams
- Houston Astros (2026–present)

Career highlights and awards
- Pitched a combined no-hitter on May 25, 2026

Alimber Daviel Santa (born May 3, 2003) is a Dominican professional baseball pitcher for the Houston Astros of Major League Baseball (MLB). He made his MLB debut in 2026.

== Career ==
On February 28, 2020, Santa signed with the Houston Astros as an international free agent. He did not play in a game in 2020 due to the cancellation of the minor league season because of the COVID-19 pandemic. Santa made his professional debut in 2021, splitting the season between the Dominican Summer League Astros and rookie-level Florida Complex League Astros. He made three appearances split between the FCL Astros and Single-A Fayetteville Woodpeckers in 2022, pitching to a 13.50 earned run average (ERA) with four strikeouts over two innings pitched.

Santa returned to Fayetteville for the 2023 season, registering a 3–9 record and 5.98 ERA with 119 strikeouts across 87 1/3 innings pitched. He split the 2024 season between the FCL Astros, the Single-A Fayetteville Woodpeckers, and Double-A Corpus Christi Hooks. In 19 appearances for the three affiliates, Santa posted a combined 1–2 record and 6.47 ERA with 49 strikeouts and one save across 40 1/3 innings pitched.

Santa began the 2025 season with Double-A Corpus Christi. He was selected to represent the Astros organization at the 2025 All-Star Futures Game. Santa made 46 total appearances split between Corpus Christi and the Triple–A Sugar Land Space Cowboys, accumulating a 3–2 record and 2.31 ERA with 82 strikeouts and two saves over 70 innings of work.

On May 22, 2026, Santa was selected to the 40-man roster and promoted to the major leagues for the first time. He made his MLB debut on May 25, pitching the final two innings of a combined no-hitter against the Texas Rangers. Santa's first career strikeout secured the final out of the combined no-hitter. Santa finished the no-hitter in relief of the starter, Tatsuya Imai and reliever Steven Okert. Santa became just the second pitcher in MLB history to pitch in a no-hitter in their major league debut. The first was Bumpus Jones, who did so in 1892 for the Cincinnati Reds. Santa made 10 total appearances for the major league club in 2026, all in relief, and yielded 8 hits, 6 runs (2 earned) and six walks over 15 1/3 innings for 1.17 earned run average (ERA) and 0.913 walks plus hits per inning pitched (WHIP). He also made 48 appearances at Sugar Land, yielding a 4.93 ERA and 1.577 WHIP in 45 1/3 innings.

== See also ==
- List of Houston Astros no-hitters
- List of Major League Baseball no-hitters
- List of Major League Baseball players from the Dominican Republic

Achievements
| Preceded by Imanaga, Pearson & Hodge | No-hitter pitcher May 25, 2026 (with Tatsuya Imai & Steven Okert ) | Succeeded by Most recent |
