= Steven Okert =

American baseball player (born 1991)

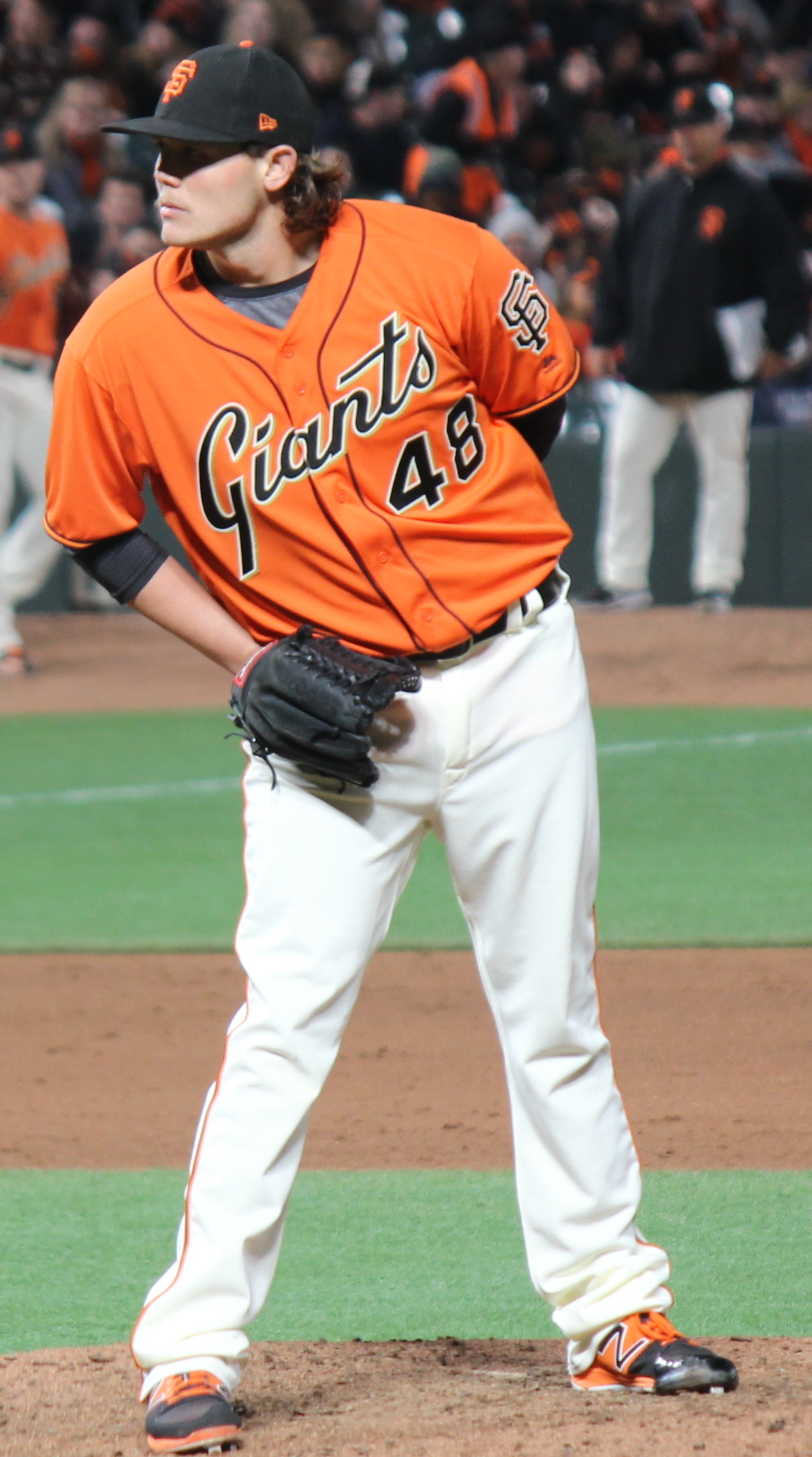
- Okert with the San Francisco Giants in 2017

Free agent
- Pitcher
- Born: July 9, 1991 (age 35); Riverside, California, U.S.
- Bats: Left Throws: Left

MLB debut
- April 19, 2016, for the San Francisco Giants

MLB statistics (through 2026 season)
- Win–loss record: 24–15
- Earned run average: 3.41
- Strikeouts: 405
- Stats at Baseball Reference

Teams
- San Francisco Giants (2016–2018); Miami Marlins (2021–2023); Minnesota Twins (2024); Houston Astros (2025–2026)

Career highlights and awards
- Pitched a combined no-hitter on May 25, 2026

Steven Chandler Okert (born July 9, 1991) is an American professional baseball pitcher who is a free agent. He has played in Major League Baseball (MLB) for the San Francisco Giants, Miami Marlins, Minnesota Twins, and Houston Astros. The Giants selected Okert in the fourth round of the 2012 Major League Baseball draft.

== Early life ==
Steven Chandler Okert was born on July 9, 1991, in Riverside, California. Okert graduated from Rowlett High School in Rowlett, Texas.

== College career ==
The Milwaukee Brewers selected him in the 43rd round of the 2010 Major League Baseball draft out of Grayson County College, but he did not sign and returned to Grayson. He was then drafted by the Brewers again in the 33rd round of the 2011 draft, but again did not sign and transferred to the University of Oklahoma. In his lone season for the Oklahoma Sooners, he appeared in 30 games with five starts, going 9–8 with a 3.07 earned run average (ERA) and 78 strikeouts.

== Professional career ==
=== Draft and minor leagues ===
The San Francisco Giants selected Okert in the fourth round, with the 148th overall pick, of the 2012 Major League Baseball draft. He made his professional debut that season for the Arizona League Giants and also played for the Salem-Keizer Volcanoes. He had a 2.20 ERA in 28 2/3 innings. Okert played the 2013 season with the Augusta GreenJackets, recording a 2.97 ERA with 59 strikeouts in 60 2/3 innings. He started 2014 with the San Jose Giants. After recording a 1.53 ERA, 19 saves and 54 strikeouts in 35 1/3 innings, he was promoted to the Double-A Richmond Flying Squirrels. The Giants added him to their 40-man roster after the 2015 season.

=== San Francisco Giants (2016–2018) ===
Okert was called up to the San Francisco Giants on April 19, 2016. Okert made his major league debut later that day against the Arizona Diamondbacks. He pitched 2 scoreless innings, getting a batter to ground into a double play and recorded his first two major league strikeouts. Okert struck out in his first MLB at-bat, coming against left-handed relief pitcher Adam Liberatore of the Dodgers. In 16 games, Okert pitched 14 innings, recording 14 strikeouts with a 3.21 ERA.

Okert started the 2017 season with Triple-A Sacramento, but was called up to the Giants in April. On May 3, 2017, Okert recorded his first major league win, pitching 1 2/3 innings of scoreless relief in an extra-inning victory over the Los Angeles Dodgers. Okert made 44 relief appearances and pitched 27 innings for the Giants during the 2017 season.

In 10 appearances for the Giants in 2018, Okert logged a 1.23 ERA. Okert was designated for assignment by the Giants on March 23, 2019, and outrighted on March 26. He spent the year in Triple-A with the Sacramento River Cats, posting a 8–2 record and 5.31 ERA in 50 appearances with the team. On November 4, he elected free agency.

=== Miami Marlins (2021–2023) ===
On February 26, 2021, Okert signed a minor league contract with the Miami Marlins organization. He was assigned to the Triple-A Jacksonville Jumbo Shrimp to begin the year. In 15 appearances with Jacksonville, he logged a 2–0 record and 1.80 ERA. On June 29, Okert was selected to the active roster. He made 34 relief appearances for the Marlins, recording a 2.75 ERA with 40 strikeouts in 36 innings.

Okert made 60 appearances out of the bullpen in 2022, registering a 5–5 record and 2.98 ERA with 63 strikeouts across 51 1/3 innings pitched. In 2023, Okert made 64 appearances for Miami and saw a slight regression in his numbers, posting a 4.45 ERA with 73 strikeouts across 58 2/3 innings of work.

=== Minnesota Twins (2024) ===
On February 11, 2024, the Marlins traded Okert to the Minnesota Twins in exchange for Nick Gordon. In 44 appearances for Minnesota, he compiled a 5.09 ERA with 33 strikeouts across 35 1/3 innings pitched. Okert was designated for assignment by the Twins on August 24. He cleared waivers and was sent outright to the Triple–A St. Paul Saints on August 26. Okert elected free agency on October 1.

=== Houston Astros (2025–present) ===
On November 5, 2024, Okert signed a minor league contract with the Houston Astros. On March 27, 2025, the Astros selected Okert's contract after he made the team's Opening Day roster. He earned his first win an Astro on April 28, when he worked a scoreless sixth inning against the Detroit Tigers before they rallied for an 8–5 win. In 2025, Okert accrued career highs with 68 appearances, 71 1/3 innings pitched and 84 strikeouts, and also finished seven games, started one, and collected one save. He yielded a 3.01 ERA, 5.7 hits per nine innings (H/9), 0.893 walks plus hits per inning pitched (WHIP), and 10.5 strikeouts per nine innings pitched (K/9).

On May 25, 2026, Okert, Tatsuya Imai, and Alimber Santa pitched a combined no-hitter against the Texas Rangers. For the season, Okert ranked 10th in the American League (AL) among qualified relivers in ERA (2.01), eighth in holds (21), and first in WHIP (0.82). Okert made 68 appearances, with one start, struck out 68 in 67 2/3 innings pitched, and worked to a 2.13 ERA overall.

== See also ==
- List of Houston Astros no-hitters
- List of Major League Baseball no-hitters

Achievements
Preceded by Imanaga, Pearson & Hodge	No-hitter pitcher May 25, 2026 (with Tatsuya Imai & Alimber Santa )	Succeeded by Most recent
