= Tatsuya Imai =

Japanese baseball player (born 1998)

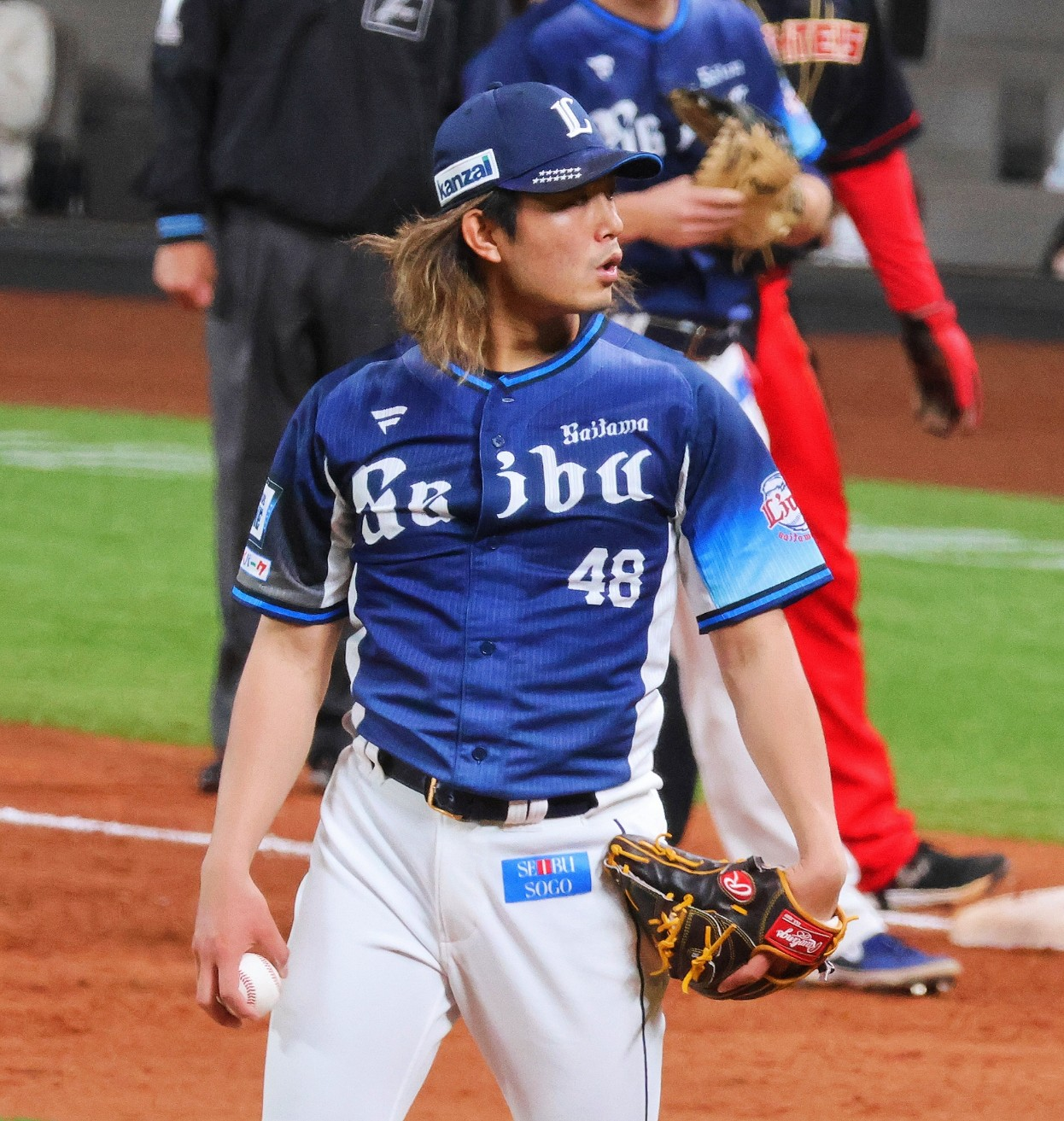
- Imai with the Saitama Seibu Lions in 2023

Houston Astros – No. 45
- Pitcher
- Born: May 9, 1998 (age 28); Kanuma, Tochigi, Japan
- Bats: Right Throws: Right

Professional debut
- NPB: June 13, 2018, for the Saitama Seibu Lions
- MLB: March 29, 2026, for the Houston Astros

NPB statistics (through 2025 season)
- Win–loss record: 58–45
- Earned run average: 3.15
- Strikeouts: 907

MLB statistics (through 2026 season)
- Win–loss record: 6–4
- Earned run average: 4.93
- Strikeouts: 97
- Stats at Baseball Reference

Teams
- Saitama Seibu Lions (2018–2025); Houston Astros (2026–present)

Career highlights and awards
- NPB: 3× NPB All-Star (2021, 2024, 2025); Pitched a combined no-hitter on April 18, 2025; MLB: Pitched a combined no-hitter on May 25, 2026
Medals
Men's baseball
Representing Japan
U-18 Asian Baseball Championship
Gold medal – first place	2016 Taichung	Team

Tatsuya Imai (今井 達也, Imai Tatsuya; born May 9, 1998) is a Japanese professional baseball pitcher for the Houston Astros of Major League Baseball (MLB). He has previously played in Nippon Professional Baseball (NPB) for the Saitama Seibu Lions. He made his NPB debut in 2018, and is a three-time NPB All-Star.

== Career ==
=== Amateur career ===
Imai started playing baseball in the first grade of elementary school. While attending Kanuma City Nishi Junior High School, he played for the Kanuma Red Sox, a local club team, and participated in the national baseball tournament. After graduating from junior high school, he enrolled in Sakushin Gakuin High School, where he became the winning pitcher of the 98th National High School Baseball Championship.

=== Saitama Seibu Lions ===
Imai made his NPB debut in 2018 with the Saitama Seibu Lions. Imai struggled in his early career. His earned run average (ERA) was 4.81 in 2018, 4.32 in 2019, and 6.13 in 2020. He vastly improved in 2021, pitching to a 3.30 ERA. He has posted a sub-3.00 ERA in every full season since then.

On April 18, 2025, Imai and Kaima Taira combined to no-hit the Fukuoka SoftBank Hawks at the Belluna Dome. Imai pitched the first eight innings, with Taira coming in to complete the no-hitter in the ninth inning. On June 17, Imai struck out 17 batters in a game against the Yokohama DeNA BayStars, surpassing a club record previously held by Daisuke Matsuzaka. On June 21, it was announced that Imai, along with first baseman Tyler Nevin, received the May Taiju Life Insurance Monthly MVP.

=== Houston Astros ===
The Lions posted Imai to Major League Baseball in November 2025, giving two months to sign with a team. On January 2, 2026, Imai signed a three-year contract with the Houston Astros for $54 million. On April 13, Imai was placed on the 10-day injured list for right arm fatigue, retroactive to April 12. On May 25, Imai pitched the first six innings of a combined no-hitter against the Texas Rangers, finished by Steven Okert and Alimber Santa, who was making his MLB debut in the game. On July 31, Houston announced that Imai would be moved to the bullpen. On September 27, he closed out the Astros' American League West-clinching win over the Athletics, fanning the final batter, Denzel Clarke. In his first MLB season, Imai went 6–4 W–L and 4.93 ERA over 23 contests and 15 starts. He worked 76 2/3 innings, struck out 97, and surrendered 1.422 walks plus hits per inning pitched (WHIP).

== Pitching style ==
Imai is a 5 ft 11 in (1.80 m), 176 lb (80 kg) right-handed pitcher. With a low three-quarters delivery, he throws a fastball sitting around 95 miles per hour (153 km/h), which tops out at 99 miles per hour (159 km/h), an above-average mid-80s slider, and a changeup.

== See also ==
- List of Houston Astros no-hitters
- List of Major League Baseball no-hitters
- List of Major League Baseball players from Japan

Achievements
Preceded by Imanaga, Pearson & Hodge	No-hitter pitcher May 25, 2026 (with Steven Okert & Alimber Santa )	Succeeded by Most recent
