= No-hitter =

Baseball game in which a team does not record a hit

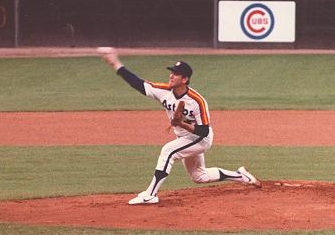
Nolan Ryan holds the record for no-hitters in the major leagues with seven.

In baseball, a no-hitter or no-hit game is a game in which a team does not record a hit through conventional methods. A pitcher who prevents the opposing team from achieving a hit is thereby said to have "thrown a no-hitter". In most cases, no-hitters are recorded by a single pitcher who throws a complete game; one thrown by two or more pitchers is a combined no-hitter.

A no-hitter is a rare accomplishment for a pitcher or pitching staff—Major League Baseball (MLB) recognizes only 327 no-hitters in major-league history since 1876, an average of about two per year. MLB officially defines a no-hitter as a completed game in which a team that batted in at least nine complete innings recorded no hits. The most recent MLB no-hitter, a combined no-hitter, was thrown by starter Tatsuya Imai and relief pitchers Steven Okert and Alimber Santa of the Houston Astros against the Texas Rangers on May 25, 2026, while the most recent no-hitter by a single pitcher was thrown by Blake Snell of the San Francisco Giants against the Cincinnati Reds on August 2, 2024.

It is possible for a batter to reach base without a hit, most commonly by a walk, an error, or being hit by a pitch; other possibilities include the batter reaching first after an uncaught third strike or catcher's interference. (Yet another possibility is a fielder's choice, but this requires that there already be a runner on base.) A no-hitter in which no batters reach base at all is a perfect game, a much rarer feat. Because a batter can reach base by means other than a hit, a pitcher can throw a no-hitter (though not a perfect game) and still give up runs or even lose the game, although this is extremely uncommon as most no-hitters are also shutouts. One or more runs were given up in 25 recorded no-hitters in MLB history, most recently by Ervin Santana of the Los Angeles Angels of Anaheim in a 3–1 win against the Cleveland Indians on July 27, 2011. On two occasions, a team has thrown a nine-inning no-hitter and still lost the game. It is theoretically possible for opposing pitchers to throw no-hitters in the same game, although this has never happened in the major leagues. Two pitchers, Fred Toney and Hippo Vaughn, completed nine innings of a game on May 2, 1917, without either giving up a hit or a run; Vaughn gave up two hits and a run in the 10th inning, losing the game to Toney, who completed the extra-inning no-hitter.

== Definition ==
A no-hitter is defined by Major League Baseball (MLB): "An official no-hit game occurs when a pitcher (or pitchers) allows no hits during the entire course of a game, which consists of at least nine innings." This 1991 definition by MLB's Committee for Statistical Accuracy caused previously recognized no-hitters of fewer than nine innings or where the first hit had been allowed in extra innings to be struck from the official record books. Games lost by the visiting team in 8 1/2 innings but without allowing any hits do not qualify as no-hitters, as the visiting team has only pitched eight innings.

== Frequency ==
MLB has recognized 327 no-hitters thrown since 1876, 24 of which were perfect games. Two no-hitters have been thrown on the same day twice: Ted Breitenstein and Jim Hughes on April 22, 1898; and Dave Stewart and Fernando Valenzuela on June 29, 1990.

The MLB season with the most no-hit games was the 2021 season, in which nine official no-hitters were pitched. Additionally, two other games that year were pitched without giving up a hit, but were not official no-hitters because they were less than nine innings. The previous record was eight, set in 1884. The previous modern era record (since 1901) was seven, accomplished in 1990, 1991, 2012, and 2015.

The longest period between two no-hitters in the modern era was three years and 44 days, between Bobby Burke on August 8, 1931, and Paul "Daffy" Dean on September 21, 1934. There was a drought of three years and 11 months without a no-hitter between the first National League no-hitter on July 15, 1876 pitched by George Bradley and the first National League perfect game on June 12, 1880, pitched by Lee Richmond. The most recent year without any no-hitters was 2025.

The greatest span of games without a no-hitter in the major leagues is 6,364, between Randy Johnson's perfect game on May 18, 2004, for the Arizona Diamondbacks, and Aníbal Sánchez's no-hitter on September 6, 2006, for the Florida Marlins. The previous record was a 4,015-game streak without a no-hitter between Mike Witt's perfect game on September 30, 1984 for the California Angels and Mike Scott's no-hitter on September 25, 1986 for the Houston Astros.

== Individual ==
Hall of Famer Sandy Koufax threw four no-hitters, including one perfect game, during his MLB career.

The pitcher who holds the record for the most no-hitters recognized by MLB is Nolan Ryan, who threw seven in his 27-year major-league career. His first two came exactly two months apart with the California Angels: the first on May 15, 1973, and the second on July 15. He had two more with the Angels on September 28, 1974, and June 1, 1975. Ryan's fifth no-hitter came with the Houston Astros on September 26, 1981, breaking Sandy Koufax's previous record. His sixth and seventh came with the Texas Rangers on June 1, 1990, and May 1, 1991. When he tossed number seven at age 44, he became the oldest pitcher to throw a no-hitter.

Only Ryan, Koufax (four), Cy Young (three), Bob Feller (three), Larry Corcoran (three), and Justin Verlander (three) have pitched more than two no-hitters. Corcoran was the first pitcher to throw a second no-hitter in a career (in 1882), as well as the first to throw a third (in 1884).

Thirty-six pitchers have thrown more than one no-hitter, combined no-hitters not counting. Ryan has the longest gap between no-hitters: he threw his first as a member of the Los Angeles Angels on May 15, 1973, and his last as a Texas Ranger on May 1, 1991.

The pitcher who holds the record for the shortest time between no-hitters is Johnny Vander Meer, the only pitcher in history to throw no-hitters in consecutive starts, while playing for the Cincinnati Reds in 1938. Besides Vander Meer, Allie Reynolds (in 1951), Virgil Trucks (in 1952), Ryan (in 1973), and Max Scherzer (in 2015) were the only major leaguers to throw two no-hitters during the same regular season.

Jim Maloney also had two no-hitters under the old rules in the 1965 season, both of them taking extra innings. In the first one on June 14, he gave up a home run to Johnny Lewis to open the top of the 11th inning, turning 10 innings of no-hit ball into a 1–0 loss to the New York Mets. According to the rules at the time, this was considered a no-hitter. On August 19, a home run by Leo Cárdenas in the tenth inning allowed Maloney to earn a 1–0 10-inning no-hit win over the Chicago Cubs.

Roy Halladay threw two no-hitters in 2010 – a perfect game during the regular season and a no-hitter in the 2010 National League Division Series. He is the only major leaguer to have thrown no-hitters in both regular season and postseason play.

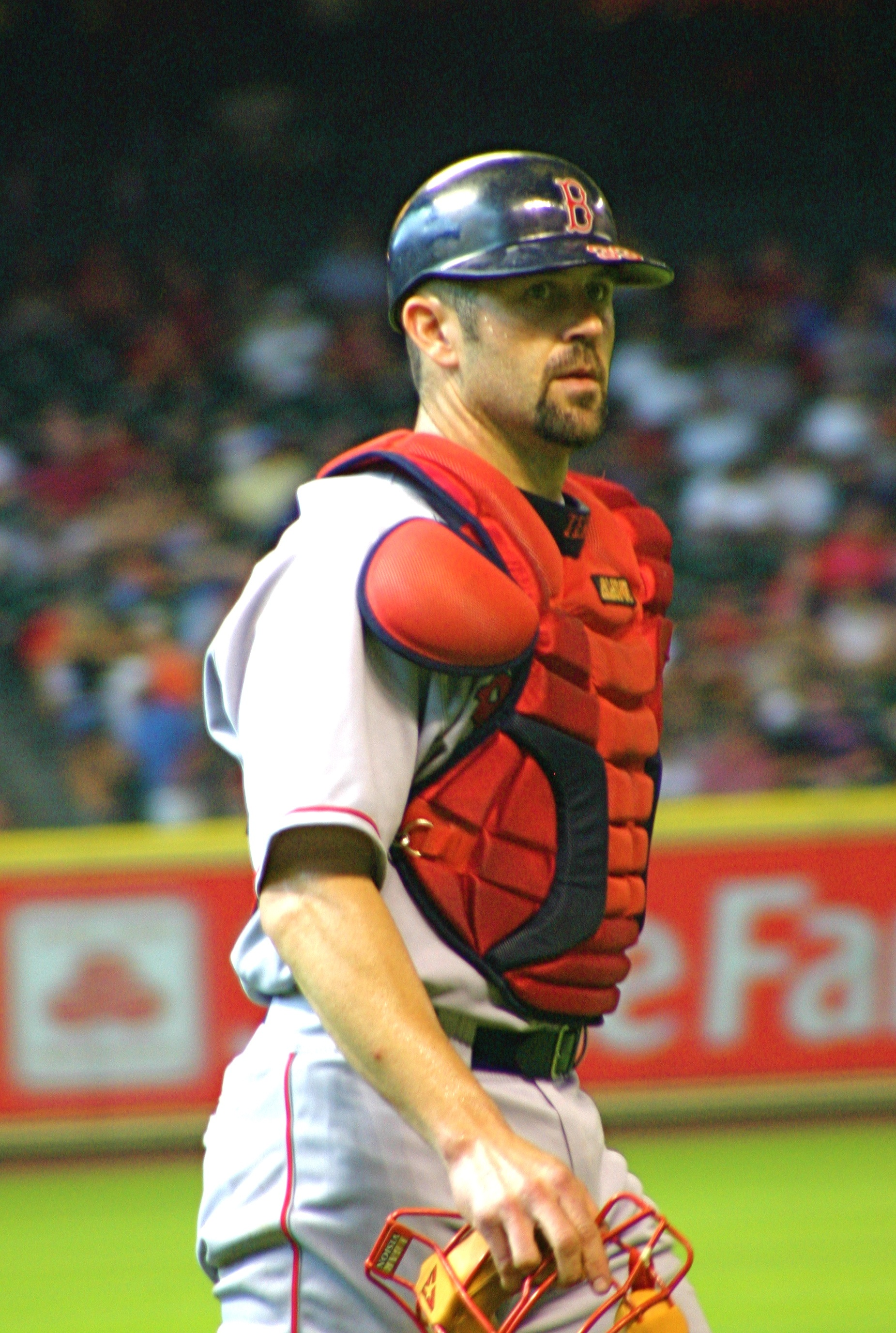
Jason Varitek caught four no-hitters during his MLB career.

Two pitchers missing their non-pitching hand have thrown no-hitters; Hugh Daily, of the Cleveland Blues, defeated the Philadelphia Quakers 1–0 on September 13, 1883, and Jim Abbott, of the New York Yankees, defeated the Cleveland Indians 4–0 on September 4, 1993. Daily lost his left hand in a gun accident as a child, and Abbott was born without a right hand.

The record for most no-hitters caught by a catcher is four, a record shared by Boston Red Sox catcher Jason Varitek and Philadelphia Phillies catcher Carlos Ruiz. Varitek caught no-hitters for Hideo Nomo, Derek Lowe, Clay Buchholz, and Jon Lester. Varitek also caught a rain-shortened, five-inning unofficial no-hitter for Devern Hansack on October 1, 2006. Ruiz caught two no-hitters for Roy Halladay, including a perfect game, as well as one for Cole Hamels, and a combined no-hitter for Cole Hamels, Jake Diekman, Ken Giles, and Jonathan Papelbon. Before MLB redefined "no-hitter", Ray Schalk had long held the record by catching four no-hitters, but his first nine-inning no-hitter had ended with a hit in the tenth inning. Victor Caratini is the only player to catch consecutive no-hitters with two different teams, and the tenth to catch consecutive no-hitters at all. The first came on September 13, 2020, with the Chicago Cubs, and the second on April 9, 2021, with the San Diego Padres.

The record for the most modern-day no-hitters participated in belongs to Jose Altuve of the Houston Astros, who has played in no-hitters thrown by Mike Fiers, Justin Verlander, Framber Valdez, and Ronel Blanco, along with three combined no-hitters and Matt Cain's perfect game.

Five pitchers have thrown a no-hitter in both the American League and the National League: Young, Ryan, Jim Bunning, Nomo, and Randy Johnson. Only five catchers have caught a no-hitter in each league: Gus Triandos, Jeff Torborg, Darrell Porter, Ron Hassey, and most recently, Drew Butera. Triandos caught Hoyt Wilhelm's 1958 no-hitter and Jim Bunning's perfect game, Torborg caught Koufax's perfect game and Ryan's first no-hitter, Porter caught Jim Colborn's 1977 no-hitter and Bob Forsch's second no-hitter in 1983, and Hassey caught Len Barker's and Dennis Martínez's perfect games. Butera caught a 2011 no-hitter by Francisco Liriano and a 2014 no-hitter by Josh Beckett.

== Team ==
No major-league team has thrown no-hitters in consecutive games, although it has happened once on consecutive days: On May 5, 1917, Ernie Koob of the St. Louis Browns no-hit the Chicago White Sox, and teammate Bob Groom repeated the feat in the second game of a doubleheader the following day.

On two occasions, there have been back-to-back no-hitters thrown by each team in a series. On September 17, 1968, Gaylord Perry of the San Francisco Giants no-hit the St. Louis Cardinals, and the Cardinals' Ray Washburn no-hit the Giants the following day. On April 30, 1969, Jim Maloney of the Cincinnati Reds no-hit the Houston Astros, and the Astros' Don Wilson no-hit the Reds the following day. Surprisingly, it was both Maloney's and Wilson's second no-hitter in their careers.

Major-league teams have thrown two straight no-hitters, with no other teams pitching one in the interim, 20 times; most recently by the Houston Astros (a combined no-hitter using four pitchers during Game 4 of the 2022 World Series and a combined no-hitter using 3 pitchers during the 2022 regular season). The only team to throw three straight no-hitters was the Milwaukee Braves, with Lew Burdette, followed by consecutive no-no's by Warren Spahn, in 1960 and 1961. Individual pitchers have thrown two straight no-hitters seven times: Addie Joss 1908 and 1910; Vander Meer in 1938; Allie Reynolds in 1951; Warren Spahn in 1960 and 1961; Ryan twice, first in 1973, then in 1974 and 1975; and Homer Bailey in 2012 and 2013. All seven instances were with the same team.

The Cleveland Guardians are the only team to be no-hit three times in a single season, doing so in 2021. They were no-hit by Carlos Rodón of the Chicago White Sox on April 14, 2021. They then failed to record a hit against the Cincinnati Reds' Wade Miley on May 7, 2021. Finally, they were held hitless by Corbin Burnes and Josh Hader of the Milwaukee Brewers on September 11, 2021. Remarkably, Zach Plesac was the Guardians' pitcher for all three no-hitters. In addition to these official no-hitters, the Guardians also failed to record a hit against the Tampa Bay Rays in the second game of a doubleheader on July 7, 2021. This is not considered an official no-hitter because the game only lasted seven innings.

== Major League Baseball no-hitters ==
=== Combined no-hitters ===
The vast majority of no-hit games are finished by the starting pitcher, but 22 MLB no-hitters have been thrown by a combination of the starting and relief pitchers. The first such combined no-hitter occurred on June 23, 1917, when Ernie Shore of the Boston Red Sox relieved starter Babe Ruth, who had been ejected for arguing with the umpire after walking the first batter of the game. The runner was subsequently caught stealing and Shore retired the next 26 batters without allowing any baserunners. This game was long considered a perfect game for Shore, since he recorded 27 outs in succession; current rules classify it only as a combined no-hitter. Another major league combined no-hitter did not occur until April 30, 1967, when Stu Miller of the Baltimore Orioles recorded the final out in relief of Steve Barber in a 2–1 loss to the Detroit Tigers.

The only combined extra inning no-hitter to date occurred on July 12, 1997. Pittsburgh Pirates pitchers Francisco Córdova (9 innings) and Ricardo Rincón (1 inning) combined to no-hit the Houston Astros, 3–0. Victory was secured with a three-run walk-off home run by pinch hitter Mark Smith in the bottom of the tenth inning.

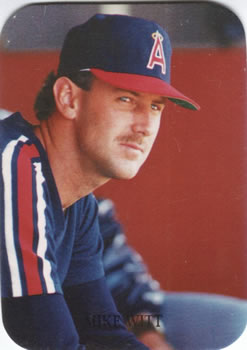
Mike Witt pitched in both a complete game no-hitter and a combined no-hitter.

On June 11, 2003, the Houston Astros set a record with six pitchers involved in a combined no-hitter. On that day, Roy Oswalt, Pete Munro, Kirk Saarloos, Brad Lidge, Octavio Dotel, and Billy Wagner combined to hold the New York Yankees hitless. Oswalt was removed after one inning due to injury. Munro pitched the most innings, 2 2/3. He also allowed five of the six baserunners, giving up three walks, hitting a batter and seeing another reach on an error by third baseman Geoff Blum. The only other baserunner was allowed by Dotel, who threw a third-strike wild pitch to Alfonso Soriano with one out in the eighth; Dotel went on to record the forty-fifth four-strikeout inning in regular-season play. Lidge, who retired all six hitters he faced over the sixth and seventh innings, earned the victory. On June 8, 2012, the Seattle Mariners tied this record when Kevin Millwood, Charlie Furbush, Stephen Pryor, Lucas Luetge, Brandon League, and Tom Wilhelmsen combined to no-hit the Los Angeles Dodgers. Millwood pitched 6 innings before he was taken out due to a groin injury.

Only one pitcher has thrown a no-hitter as a starter and contributed to a combined no-hitter as a reliever. On September 30, 1984, Mike Witt threw a 1–0 perfect game for the California Angels against the Texas Rangers. On April 11, 1990, pitching the eighth and ninth innings in relief of Mark Langston, Witt earned a save in another 1–0 no-hit victory for the Los Angeles Angels over the Seattle Mariners.

Vida Blue, Kent Mercker, Kevin Millwood, and Cole Hamels are the only pitchers to start both a complete game no-hitter and a combined no-hitter. Vida Blue no-hit the Minnesota Twins on September 21, 1970, while pitching for the Oakland Athletics. He combined with Glenn Abbott, Paul Lindblad, and Rollie Fingers to no-hit the California Angels on September 28, 1975. While with the Atlanta Braves in 1991, Mercker, Mark Wohlers and Alejandro Peña no-hit the San Diego Padres in the National League's first combined no-hitter. Mercker threw a complete game no-hitter against the Los Angeles Dodgers on April 8, 1994. In addition to the game above in which Millwood and the Seattle Mariners tied the record by using six pitchers in a no-hitter, Millwood previously threw a complete game no-hitter against the San Francisco Giants on April 27, 2003, while with the Philadelphia Phillies. Both Mercker and Blue were All-Stars in the seasons of their combined no-hitters, and Blue also won the Cy Young Award and the Most Valuable Player Award during his career.

In 2022, Cristian Javier started in two combined no-hitters that were both successfully closed out by Ryan Pressly. They became the only pitchers to participate in multiple combined no-hitters.

Combined no-hitters are not recognized by Nippon Professional Baseball and KBO League.

==== MLB Opening Day, title-clinching, and postseason no-hitters ====
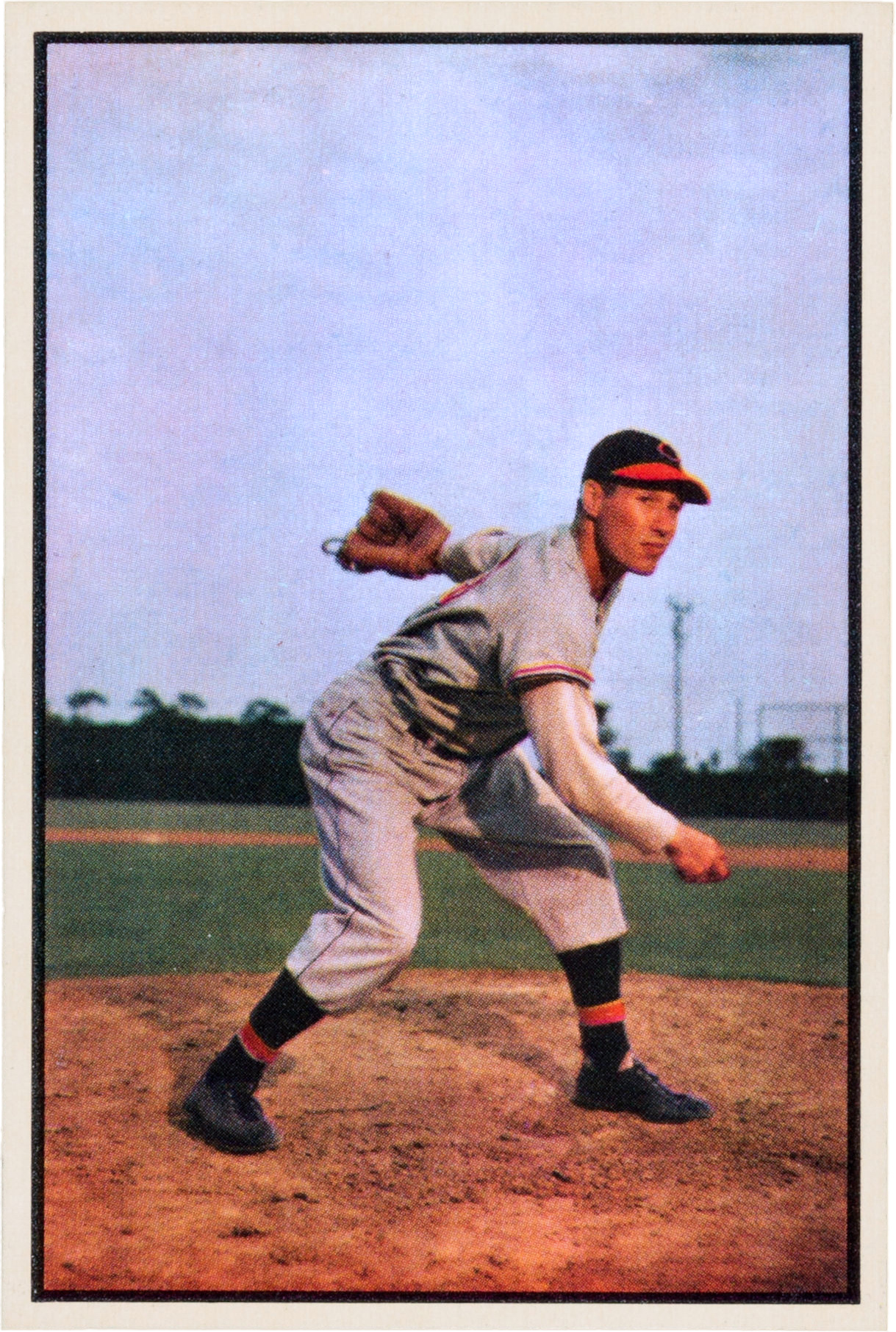
Bob Feller pitched the first Opening Day no-hitter, in 1940.

The Cleveland Indians' Bob Feller left the Chicago White Sox hitless in the 1940 season opener on April 16, the first official Opening Day no-hitter. With the 2020 recognition of certain Negro Leagues as major leagues, Leon Day's no-hitter on May 5, 1946, to open the season for the Newark Eagles against the Philadelphia Stars, should also be recognized.

The Houston Astros' Mike Scott no-hit the San Francisco Giants on September 25, 1986, a victory that also clinched the National League West title for the Astros; this is the only such concurrence in Major League history to date. In the first game of a doubleheader on September 28, 1951, Allie Reynolds of the New York Yankees pitched a no-hitter against the Boston Red Sox which clinched a tie for the American League pennant; the pennant was clinched outright in the doubleheader's second game.

There have been three postseason no-hitters in MLB history: two solo and one combined. On October 8, 1956, Don Larsen of the New York Yankees threw a perfect game in Game 5 of that year's World Series against the Brooklyn Dodgers. Nine years earlier, the Yankees' Bill Bevens had come within one out of a no-hitter against the Brooklyn Dodgers in Game 4 of the 1947 World Series, only to lose the game on a pinch-hit double by Cookie Lavagetto. (There have been other one-hitters in the World Series, with the lone hit coming earlier in the game than in Bevens' effort.) On October 6, 2010, Roy Halladay of the Philadelphia Phillies, in the first postseason appearance of his career, threw the second no-hitter in postseason history, in Game 1 of the Phillies' NLDS against the Cincinnati Reds. On November 2, 2022, Cristian Javier, Bryan Abreu, Rafael Montero, and Ryan Pressly of the Houston Astros combined to no-hit the Phillies in Game 4 of that year's World Series.

==== MLB Rookie no-hitters ====
Twenty-five MLB rookies have pitched a no-hitter since 1901. Four pitchers have thrown a no-hitter in their first major league start; two others have done it in their second major league starts.

Bumpus Jones of the Cincinnati Reds threw a no-hitter on October 15, 1892, in his first major league game. Jones pitched only eight games in the big leagues, finishing with a career win–loss record of 2–4 and a career earned run average of 7.99.

Alimber Santa of the Houston Astros threw the final two innings of a combined no-hitter on May 25, 2026, in his first major league game.

Ted Breitenstein pitched a no-hitter in his first major league start on October 4, 1891; however, it was not his first major league game. He later threw a second no-hitter on April 22, 1898.

Charlie Robertson of the Chicago White Sox pitched a perfect game against the Detroit Tigers on April 30, 1922, in his fourth career start and fifth career appearance.

On May 6, 1953, Bobo Holloman pitched a no-hitter for the St. Louis Browns in his first major league start (although not his first major league game, as he had previously pitched in relief). This game would prove to be one of only three major league wins that Holloman achieved, against seven losses, all in 1953. Bill Veeck, then-owner of the Browns, in his autobiography described the 27 outs of Holloman's no-hitter as consisting of hard-hit ground balls, screaming line drives, and deep fly balls.

On August 11, 1991, Wilson Álvarez of the Chicago White Sox pitched a no-hitter in his second career major league start. During Alvarez's first career start, he had allowed three runs on a pair of home runs and did not retire a single batter. Unlike Jones and Holloman, Alvarez went on to win 102 games over a 16-year career.

Clay Buchholz pitched a no-hitter for the Boston Red Sox in his second major league start on September 1, 2007, at Fenway Park. The game ended in a 10–0 victory for the Red Sox over the Baltimore Orioles.

On August 14, 2021, Tyler Gilbert of the Arizona Diamondbacks pitched a no-hitter against the San Diego Padres in his first major league start and fourth appearance. His first major league game came just 11 days before his no-hitter.

At the other end of the spectrum, there are nine 300-game winners—Grover Cleveland Alexander, Kid Nichols, Lefty Grove, Early Wynn, Steve Carlton, Don Sutton, Greg Maddux, Roger Clemens and Tom Glavine—who failed to pitch a no-hitter.

==== Nine-inning MLB no-hitters in a losing effort ====
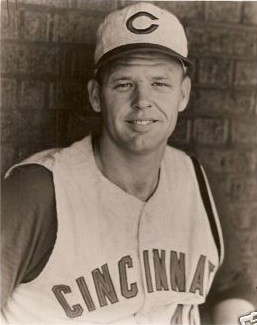
Ken Johnson pitched a no-hitter in 1964 but was the losing pitcher of the game.

Batters in regular no-hitters can reach base in several ways, such as a walk, error, or hit by pitch, making it possible for the team pitching the no-hitter to lose. On April 23, 1964, Ken Johnson of the Houston Colt .45s became the only pitcher to lose a complete game no-hitter in nine innings when he was beaten, 1–0, by the Cincinnati Reds. The winning run was scored by Pete Rose in the top of the ninth inning via an error, groundout, and another error.

On April 30, 1967, Steve Barber and Stu Miller of the Baltimore Orioles pitched a combined no-hitter, but lost 2–1 to the Detroit Tigers.

On July 1, 1990, Andy Hawkins of the New York Yankees pitched an eight-inning no-hitter (the Yankees were the away team) against the Chicago White Sox and lost the game 4–0 after an eighth inning which saw three errors. The four runs that the White Sox scored are the most by any team in a game in which they had no hits. Because Hawkins only threw eight innings, this game is not recognized as an official no-hitter by Major League Baseball; however, it was considered a no-hitter at the time it was pitched. In the year after the game, the rules regarding no-hitters, (and rules regarding other statistics), were changed and applied retroactively in order to "clean up the record book". The Hawkins "no-hitter" failed on one main provision of the new standards. To be classified a valid no-hitter, the pitcher or pitching staff must hold the opposing team hitless for the entire game and face opposing batters in at least nine full innings, meaning the only way a team can pitch a losing no-hitter on the road is if the game goes to extra innings and the home team manages to win the game on a walk-off without the benefit of a hit.

On April 12, 1992, Matt Young of the Boston Red Sox faced the Cleveland Indians in the first game of a doubleheader. Young allowed no hits but gave up two runs on seven walks and an error by shortstop Luis Rivera, en route to the second unofficial no-hitter by a losing pitcher on the road.

Jered Weaver and José Arredondo of the Los Angeles Angels also combined for eight innings of no-hit baseball in a 1–0 road loss to the Los Angeles Dodgers on June 28, 2008, after Matt Kemp reached on an error, stole second, advanced to third on another error, and scored on a sacrifice fly. However, since the Angels only pitched eight innings, this game is once again not recognized as an official no-hitter.

On May 15, 2022, Cincinnati Reds pitchers Hunter Greene and Art Warren also combined to pitch an eight inning no-hit loss against the Pittsburgh Pirates. The only run of the game was scored when Pirates shortstop Rodolfo Castro scored on a groundout. The game is again not recognized as an official no-hitter, due to only 8 innings of no-hit play.

==== Shortened MLB no-hitters ====
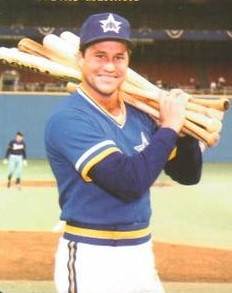
Matt Young allowed no hits in a 1992 game that is not considered a no-hitter because he only pitched eight innings.

A game shortened by previous agreement or that cannot continue due to weather or darkness may be considered a completed official game, as long as at least five innings have been completed. Until 1991, any such game in which a pitcher held the opposing team without hits was considered an official no-hitter; under the current rule, however, a no-hitter must last for at least nine innings. There have been thirty-seven such shortened no-hitters. As the rule was applied retroactively, there are thirty-five games in which a no-hitter was shortened by previous agreement, weather, or darkness, with lengths ranging from 5 to 8 innings, that are no longer considered no-hitters.

There have been four shortened no-hitters that were ended early as part of a previous agreement for travel purposes.

In 2020 and 2021, MLB used seven-inning doubleheaders, and on April 25, 2021, Madison Bumgarner threw the fifth shortened no-hitter in baseball history that was not shortened by weather or darkness. On July 7, 2021, Collin McHugh, Josh Fleming, Diego Castillo, Matt Wisler, and Pete Fairbanks of the Tampa Bay Rays threw a combined seven-inning no-hitter. No-hitters recorded in seven-inning doubleheaders do not count as official no-hitters unless the game lasts at least nine innings and the no-hitter is preserved through the end of the game.

If the home team leads after the top of the ninth, they do not bat in the bottom of the ninth, thus the visiting team only pitches eight innings. Since it is possible to score runs without getting hits, a visiting team can complete a full game without allowing a hit but not be credited with an official no-hitter. This has happened five times in MLB history. Silver King (1890), Andy Hawkins (1990), and Matt Young (1992) pitched complete games without allowing a hit, but pitched only eight innings as the losing pitcher from the visiting team, and thus are not credited with a no-hitter. In 2008, Jered Weaver and José Arredondo combined to throw eight no hit innings, and in 2022, Hunter Greene and Art Warren also combined to throw eight no-hit innings, while losing the game 1–0.

==== MLB no-hitters broken up in extra innings ====
A game that is a no-hitter through nine innings may be broken up in extra innings. Under current rules, such a game (whether won or lost) is not considered an official no-hitter because the pitching staff did not keep the opposing team hitless for the entire course of the game.

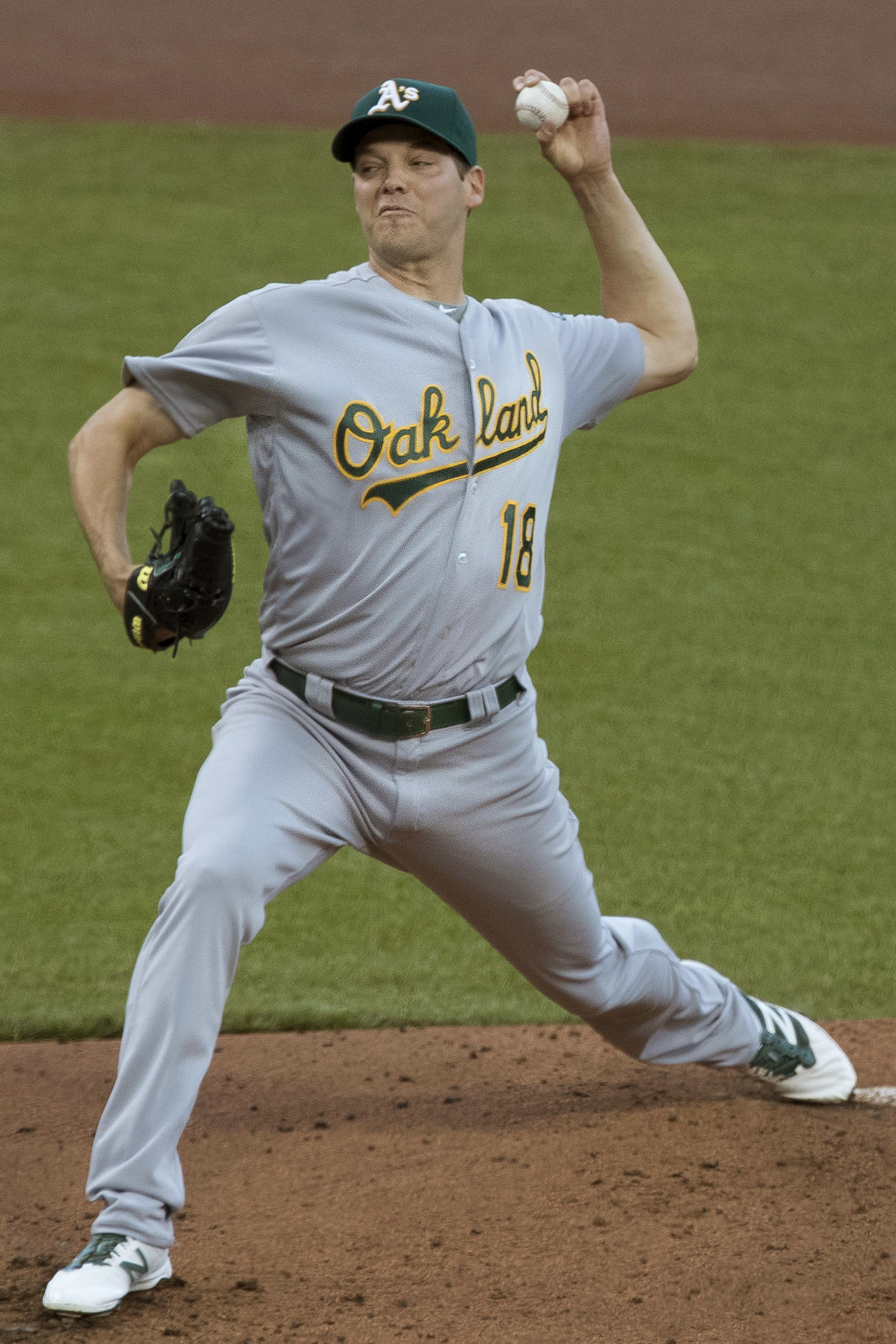
Rich Hill had a potential no-hitter broken up in extra innings in 2017.

On May 2, 1917, a game between the Chicago Cubs and Cincinnati Reds reached the end of nine innings in a hitless scoreless tie, the only time in baseball history that neither team has had a hit in regulation. Both Hippo Vaughn of the Cubs and Fred Toney of the Reds continued pitching into the tenth inning. Vaughn lost his no-hitter in the top of the tenth, as the Reds got two hits and scored the winning run. Toney retired the side in the bottom of the tenth and recorded a ten-inning no-hitter. This game was long considered a "double no-hitter", but Vaughn is no longer credited with a no-hitter under the current rules.

Of the sixteen potential no-hitters that have been lost in extra innings, two were perfect games until the inning when the first hit was surrendered. On May 26, 1959, Harvey Haddix of the Pittsburgh Pirates pitched a remarkable twelve perfect innings against the Milwaukee Braves before losing the perfect game on an error and then the no-hitter and the game in the thirteenth inning. On June 3, 1995, Pedro Martínez of the Montreal Expos pitched nine perfect innings against the San Diego Padres before giving up a hit in the tenth and exiting the game, which the Expos then won, 1–0.

On August 23, 2017, in a game between the Los Angeles Dodgers and the Pittsburgh Pirates, Dodgers pitcher Rich Hill pitched nine no-hit innings, only to lose his no-hit bid (and the game) on a walk-off homer by Josh Harrison in the 10th inning. This was another potential perfect game; the perfect game was broken up by a ninth-inning error, the first time that had happened in MLB history.

On April 23, 2022, the Tampa Bay Rays threw a combined no-hitter against the Red Sox that was broken up in the tenth inning. J. P. Feyereisen, Javy Guerra, Jeffrey Springs, Jason Adam, Ryan Thompson, and Andrew Kittredge threw nine hitless frames before Matt Wisler surrendered a triple to Boston's Bobby Dalbec, which scored the extra-innings runner on second base. The Rays would go on to walk-off the game in the bottom of the inning with a Kevin Kiermaier home run; Wisler was credited with the win.

On September 10, 2023, the Milwaukee Brewers threw 10 combined no-hit innings against the New York Yankees, before the no-hitter was broken up in the bottom of the 11th, with the Yankees later winning the game. Corbin Burnes pitched 8 of those no-hit innings, followed by Devin Williams and Abner Uribe in two consecutive no-hit innings, before Oswaldo Cabrera hit a run-scoring double off of Joel Payamps in the bottom of the 11th. The Yankees ultimately won on a Kyle Higashioka double in the bottom of the 13th off of Hoby Milner, who is credited with the loss.

==== Time between MLB franchise no-hitters ====
All 30 active teams in Major League Baseball have pitched a no-hitter. The last active MLB team to throw its first no-hitter was the San Diego Padres, when pitcher Joe Musgrove struck out ten batters and held the Texas Rangers hitless at Globe Life Field on April 9, 2021, 52 years after the team's debut in 1969. The closest attempt by a single pitcher prior to 2021 was against the Philadelphia Phillies on July 18, 1972: Steve Arlin came within one out of a no-hitter before Denny Doyle broke up his bid with a single. On July 9, 2011, five Padres pitchers combined for 8 2/3 innings of no-hit pitching against the Los Angeles Dodgers before Juan Uribe hit a double, which was followed by a Dioner Navarro single that allowed the Dodgers to score to win the game, 1–0.

The Cleveland Guardians have the longest active no-hitter drought; the last such game thrown by the team was Len Barker's perfect game on May 15, 1981.

The New York Mets, who began play in 1962, went without a no-hitter until Johan Santana pitched one on the night of June 1, 2012, against the St. Louis Cardinals at home at Citi Field. The 8–0 victory closed out their era as the oldest franchise without a no-hitter and ended a drought that lasted 8,019 regular-season and 74 post-season games. As of the start of the 2021 season, Mets pitchers have thrown 39 one-hitters.

The longest no-hitter drought in MLB history was suffered by the Philadelphia Phillies between May 1, 1906, and June 21, 1964, a span of 8,945 games.

The Washington Nationals achieved their first no-hitter on September 28, 2014. The franchise has four previous no-hitters in its history as the Montreal Expos, including a perfect game by Dennis Martínez.

Six current NL teams—the Braves, Dodgers, Giants, Phillies, Cubs and Reds—all pitched their first no-hitters before the advent of the American League in 1901. Among the early National League teams still playing, the last to record its first no-hitter were the St. Louis Cardinals, when Jesse Haines pitched one on July 17, 1924. Of the original American League teams, the last team to record its first no-hitter were the New York Yankees, when George Mogridge pitched one on April 24, 1917. There are a number of short-lived Major League franchises from the nineteenth century that folded without ever recording a no-hitter.

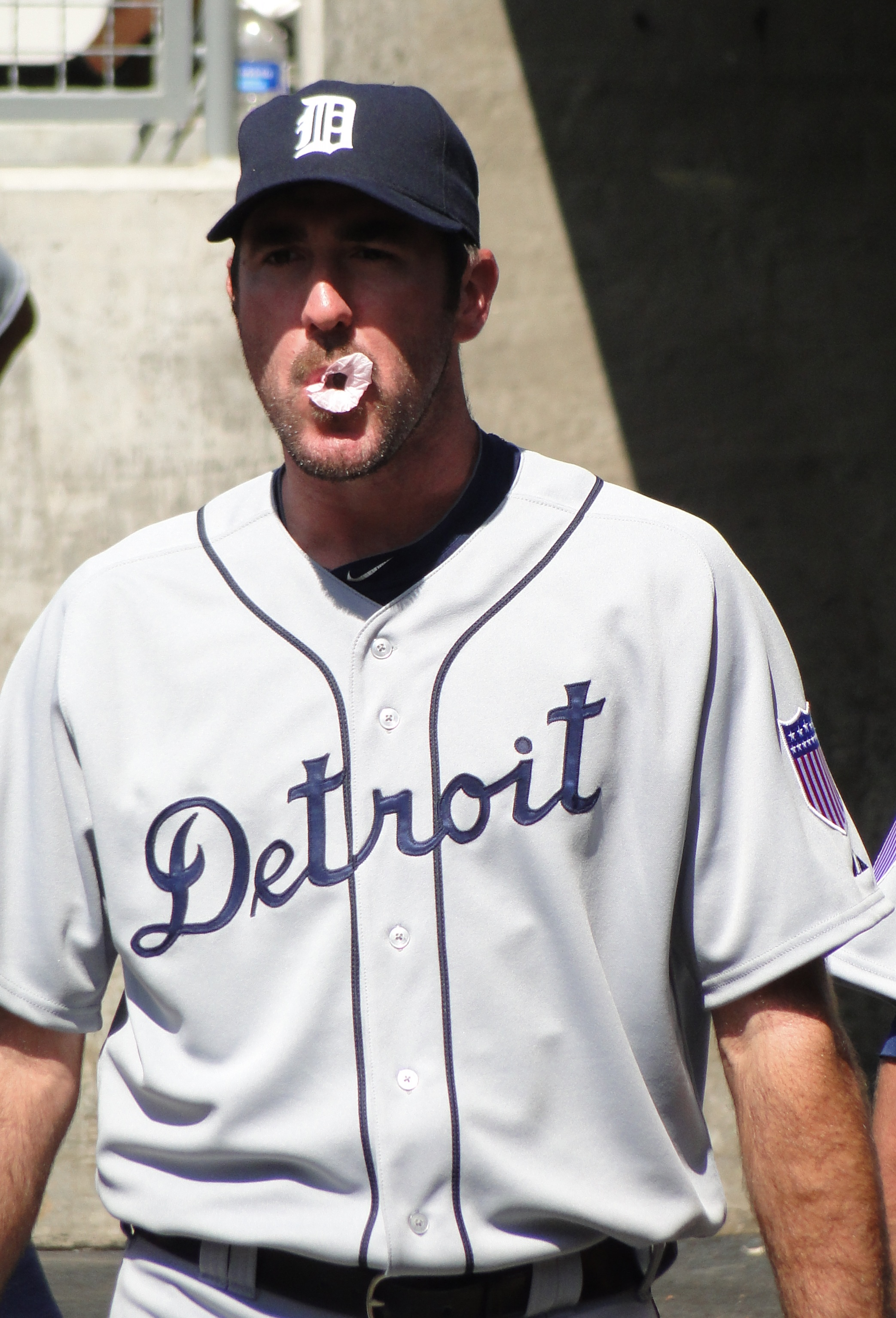
Justin Verlander threw his first two no-hitters for the Detroit Tigers, and more recently one for the Houston Astros.

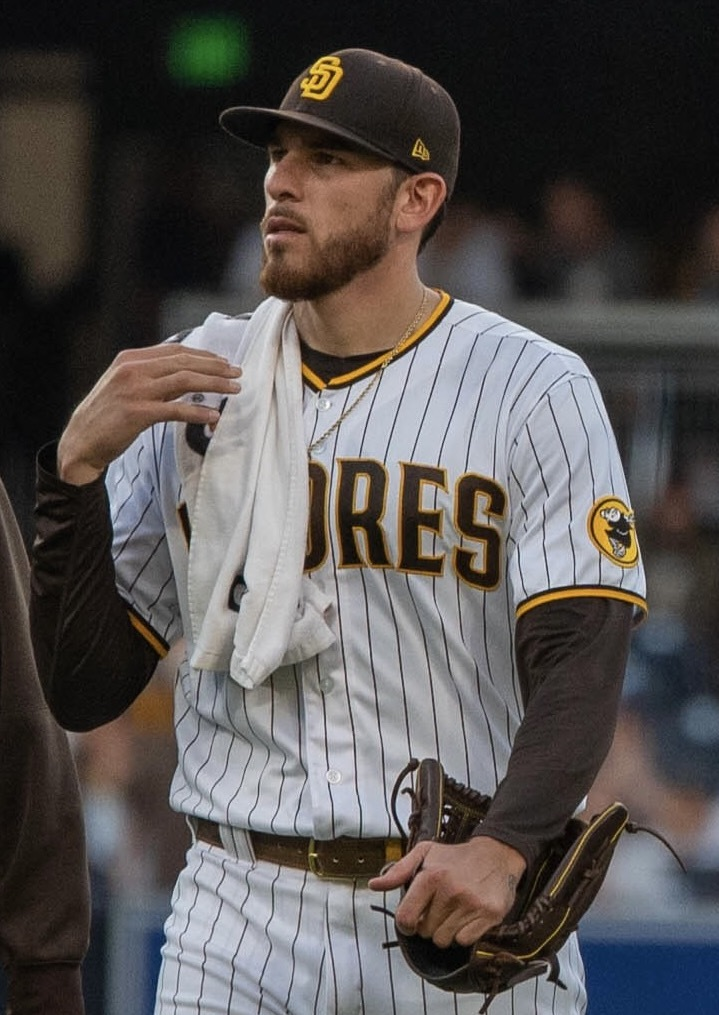
Joe Musgrove pitched the first no-hitter for the San Diego Padres.

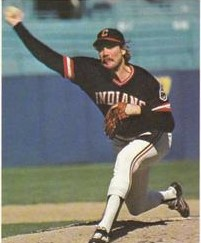
Len Barker's perfect game is the most recent no-hitter for the Cleveland Guardians.

Most recent no-hitter for each active MLB franchise
Date of no-hitter	Pitcher(s)	Franchise	Time since no-hitter
August 14, 2021	Tyler Gilbert	Arizona Diamondbacks	5 years, 97 days
May 7, 2019	Mike Fiers	Athletics	7 years, 196 days
April 8, 1994	Kent Mercker	Atlanta Braves	32 years, 225 days
May 5, 2021	John Means	Baltimore Orioles	5 years, 198 days
May 19, 2008	Jon Lester	Boston Red Sox	18 years, 184 days
September 4, 2024	Shota Imanaga (7 IP); Nate Pearson (1 IP); Porter Hodge (1 IP)	Chicago Cubs	2 years, 76 days
April 14, 2021	Carlos Rodón	Chicago White Sox	5 years, 219 days
May 7, 2021	Wade Miley	Cincinnati Reds	5 years, 196 days
May 15, 1981	Len Barker	Cleveland Guardians	45 years, 188 days
April 17, 2010	Ubaldo Jiménez	Colorado Rockies	16 years, 216 days
July 8, 2023	Matt Manning (6.2 IP); Jason Foley (1.1 IP); Alex Lange (1 IP)	Detroit Tigers	3 years, 134 days
May 25, 2026	Tatsuya Imai (6.0 IP); Steven Okert (1.0 IP); Alimber Santa (2.0 IP)	Houston Astros	178 days
August 26, 1991	Bret Saberhagen	Kansas City Royals	35 years, 85 days
May 10, 2022	Reid Detmers	Los Angeles Angels	4 years, 193 days
May 4, 2018	Walker Buehler (6 IP); Tony Cingrani (1 IP); Yimi Garcia (1 IP); Adam Liberatore (1 IP)	Los Angeles Dodgers	8 years, 199 days
June 3, 2017	Edinson Vólquez	Miami Marlins	9 years, 169 days
September 11, 2021	Corbin Burnes (8 IP); Josh Hader (1 IP)	Milwaukee Brewers	5 years, 69 days
May 3, 2011	Francisco Liriano	Minnesota Twins	15 years, 200 days
April 29, 2022	Tylor Megill (5 IP); Drew Smith (1.1 IP); Joely Rodríguez (1 IP); Seth Lugo (0.2 IP); Edwin Díaz (1 IP)	New York Mets	4 years, 204 days
June 28, 2023	Domingo Germán	New York Yankees	3 years, 144 days
August 9, 2023	Michael Lorenzen	Philadelphia Phillies	3 years, 102 days
July 12, 1997	Francisco Córdova (9 IP); Ricardo Rincón (1 IP)	Pittsburgh Pirates	29 years, 130 days
July 25, 2024	Dylan Cease	San Diego Padres	2 years, 117 days
August 2, 2024	Blake Snell	San Francisco Giants	2 years, 109 days
May 8, 2018	James Paxton	Seattle Mariners	8 years, 195 days
September 3, 2001	Bud Smith	St. Louis Cardinals	25 years, 77 days
July 26, 2010	Matt Garza	Tampa Bay Rays	16 years, 116 days
July 28, 1994	Kenny Rogers	Texas Rangers	32 years, 114 days
September 2, 1990	Dave Stieb	Toronto Blue Jays	36 years, 78 days
October 3, 2015	Max Scherzer	Washington Nationals	11 years, 47 days

==== Avoiding no-hitters ====
All modern-era MLB teams have experienced at least two no-hitters pitched against them. The record for the longest period of time without being no-hit is held by the Chicago Cubs, who succeeded in getting at least one hit in every game following Sandy Koufax's perfect game against them on September 9, 1965, until they were no-hit by Cole Hamels of the Philadelphia Phillies on July 25, 2015, a period of 49 years, 318 days (7951 games, including 31 postseason games). Koufax's perfect game, together with Bob Hendley's one-hitter, is the only major league game in which the two teams combined for only one hit.

The second-longest streak without having an official no-hitter pitched against them is held by the New York Yankees, who had a gap of 44 years, 263 days between nine-inning no-hitters from September 21, 1958, to June 10, 2003. However, during this time, the Yankees failed to collect a hit in a rain-shortened official game on July 12, 1990, after 31 years, 294 days.

Including games of less than nine innings, the St. Louis Cardinals have the second-longest streak between games when they did not collect a hit: May 12, 1919, to May 14, 1960, a period of 41 years, 3 days. Among AL teams, the Kansas City Royals hold the longest such streak: May 15, 1973 to May 19, 2008, a period of 35 years, 4 days.

The longest current streak is held by the Los Angeles Angels, last held hitless on September 11, 1999 (27 years, 69 days) ago by Minnesota Twins pitcher Eric Milton.

==== No-hitters and MLB ballparks ====
Forbes Field, home of the Pittsburgh Pirates from the middle of the 1909 season until the middle of the 1970 season, is the only long-term major league ballpark in which no no-hitter was thrown during its existence. No-hitters have not yet been thrown in three recently built fields: Busch Stadium, Truist Park, and Target Field. Four current parks that have in existence for a decade or more have seen only one no-hitter each: Coors Field, the hitter-friendly home of the Colorado Rockies (Hideo Nomo on September 17, 1996); the Orioles' current home, Oriole Park at Camden Yards, known for being hitter-friendly (Nomo on April 4, 2001); PNC Park, the current home of the Pirates, which like Forbes Field is known for being hitter-friendly (Homer Bailey on September 28, 2012); and Petco Park, home of the San Diego Padres, which initially was known as a pitcher's park but was modified with shorter fences in 2013 (Tim Lincecum on July 13, 2013).

American Family Field, home of the Milwaukee Brewers, has hosted two no-hitters, but only one involved its home team. Both no-hitters were thrown by the Chicago Cubs—Alec Mills threw a no-hitter on September 13, 2020, against the Brewers; and Carlos Zambrano pitched one on September 14, 2008, against the "home" Houston Astros in a game displaced by Hurricane Ike.

== All-American Girls Professional Baseball League ==
The All-American Girls Professional Baseball League (AAGPBL) existed from 1943 to 1954. 59 no-hitters are known to have occurred in the league. Marge Holgerson and Jean Faut had the most no-hitters, with each throwing four. The 1948 playoffs saw the only postseason AAGPBL no-hitters: Lois Florreich threw one for Rockford on September 9, and two days later, Holgerson did the same for Rockford.

Olive Little threw the first no-hitter in team and league history, for the Rockford Peaches on June 10, 1943.

Four of the league's players pitched a perfect game (note that all perfect games are no-hitters, but not all no-hitters are perfect games): Annabelle Lee in 1944, Carolyn Morris in 1945, Doris Sams in 1947, and Jean Faut in 1951 (against the Rockford Peaches) and again in 1953 (against the Kalamazoo Lassies). Faut is the only professional baseball player, male or female, to have pitched two perfect games.

== Nippon Professional Baseball ==
There have been 101 no-hitters in Nippon Professional Baseball history. As noted above, unlike Major League Baseball, the Japanese league does not count combined or not shutout no-hitters. The record for most No-Hitters thrown by an individual in NPB history is three, by Eiji Sawamura and Yoshiro Sotokoba. On November 1, 2007, a combined perfect game (No-hitter) was thrown by the Chunichi Dragons during Game 5 of the 2007 Japan Series. Starting pitcher Daisuke Yamai pitched eight perfect innings and received the win, with Hitoki Iwase receiving the save; the Dragons' victory also resulted in them winning the Japan Series. Although NPB does not recognize this as a perfect game due to it not being a complete game, it is recognized as a perfect game by the World Baseball Softball Confederation. This makes it the only perfect game thrown during the Japan Series, and the only combined perfect game in history to span a regulation nine innings.

== KBO League ==
There have been 14 no-hitters in KBO League history. As noted above, unlike Major League Baseball, the KBO League does not count combined or not shutout no-hitters.

== Negro leagues ==
Ongoing research by baseball historians has revealed the existence of 34 no-hitters thrown in Negro league baseball; the research has had to clarify differences between play from teams and barnstorming, and one of the no-hitters occurred at a Benefit All-Star Game. In 2020, Major League Baseball announced the addition of the seven "Negro Major Leagues" that played from 1920 to 1948 to the major leagues, recognizing statistics from over 3,400 players who played in those seasons, thus increasing further the need for research and verification of no-hitters.

This presumes that 22 to 24 no-hitters from that said era (22 regular season, one postseason, one All-Star game) could be recognized by official record books such as Elias in future years. There are also six games that were prematurely cut from the intended length of nine innings that were called due to weather that ranged from 1926 to 1945, one of which includes Luther Farrell and his seven-inning no-hitter in Game 5 of the 1927 Colored World Series.

Four pitchers threw two no-hitters: Phil Cockrell, Jesse Winters, Satchel Paige, and Porter Moss; Dick Redding, nicknamed "Cannonball", was reported to have thrown as many as 30 no-hitters in his career, but the disparity in finding enough box scores to verify such claim still proves too great for researchers (incidentally, Paige had estimated he threw 55 no-hitters in a long career of league games and barnstorming). At any rate, his no-hitter for the Lincoln Giants against the Cuban Stars is generally considered the first no-hitter documented between two African American teams considered to have played at the highest level. Leon Day threw a no-hitter on May 5, 1946, to open the season for the Newark Eagles against the Philadelphia Stars, which is believed to be the second no-hitter thrown by a pitcher on Opening Day.

Eleven were done in the 1910s, while fourteen were verified to have been done in the 1920s, six in the 1930s, and three in the 1940s. Likely the most famous no-hitter thrown by a player in the Negro leagues was Red Grier, who pitched a no-hitter in Game 3 of the 1926 Colored World Series on October 3, 1926, doing so for the Bacharach Giants against the Chicago American Giants. It was the first no-hitter thrown in a major league postseason game, and no one would throw another in the playoffs until Don Larsen 30 years later.

== International competition ==
In the 2006 World Baseball Classic, Shairon Martis pitched a shortened no-hitter for the Netherlands against Panama. The game was ended after seven innings due to the mercy rule. In the 2023 World Baseball Classic, four Puerto Rico pitchers (José De León (5.2 innings), Yacksel Ríos (0.1 inning), Edwin Díaz (1 inning), and Duane Underwood Jr. (1 inning)) combined for a shortened perfect game against Israel. The game was ended after eight innings due to the mercy rule.

== Other notable no-hitters ==
On May 29, 1876, Joseph McElroy Mann, known as the first consistent college curveball pitcher, is credited by John Thorn, official baseball historian for Major League Baseball, as having thrown nine innings without allowing a single hit, leading Princeton to 3–0 victory over Yale at Hamilton Park in New Haven, Connecticut. This is believed to be the first recorded no-hitter in organized baseball.

Three no-hitters have been thrown in the College World Series, the most recent being thrown on June 16, 2025 by Arkansas pitcher Gage Wood in a 3-0 win against Murray State in an elimination game.

Two no-hitters have been thrown in the Caribbean Series. The first, in 1952, was thrown by Tommy Fine of the Leones del Habana (Cuba), against Cerveceria Caracas (Venezuela). The second would not be thrown until 2024, by Ángel Padrón of Tiburones de La Guaira (Venezuela) in a 9-0 victory over Gigantes de Rivas (Nicaragua).

Considered to be one of the greatest amateur pitchers in Ontario in the 1950s and 1960s, southpaw Jack Roberts pitched two consecutive no-hitters for the Campbellville Merchants – a team with a .771 winning percentage – in an Ontario Baseball Association Intermediate C round-robin final in 1966.

In 1974 Bunny Taylor became the first girl to pitch a no-hitter in Little League Baseball.

A very unusual seven-inning no hitter was thrown by the Los Angeles Angels' Class AA minor league affiliate of the Southern League, the Rocket City Trash Pandas, based in Madison, Alabama. On April 8, 2023, in a scheduled seven-inning game, Rocket City was leading the Reds' AA affiliate, the Chattanooga Lookouts, 3–0, after six innings and needed three outs to complete the no-hitter. With the aide of five walks, four batters hit by pitches, a wild pitch, and a crucial three-run error by the Trash Pandas' center fielder on a fly ball that would have won the game for Rocket City had it been caught, Chattanooga scored seven runs without a hit, eventually winning the game 7–5. Only six major league teams have had no-hitters in a loss. Surrendering seven runs without a hit, all in the opponent's final at-bat, is unprecedented.

== No-hitter with complete game shutout win ==
Unlike MLB and the WBSC (global sanctioning body of baseball) definitions, a no-hitter is called a "no hit, no run" game in Eastern Asian professional leagues. The requirements are different from the traditional definition; the game is a shutout victory where the starting pitcher pitches the entire game while allowing no hits, and no runs are scored (a no-hitter by the traditional definition runs may score by walk, hit by pitch, defensive interference, errors, stolen bases, and balks). In those leagues, a no-hitter is not regarded as an official record unless the starting pitcher pitches the whole game and the opposing team scores zero runs, and the team either wins or the game ends in a tie, which happens when the innings limit is reached. There is a twelve-inning limit in these leagues.

== Superstitions ==
One of the most common baseball superstitions is that it is bad luck to mention a no-hitter in progress, especially to the pitcher and in particular by their teammates (who sometimes even go so far as to avoid even going near the pitcher). Some sportscasters observe this taboo while others have no reservations about mentioning no-hitters before completion. When Sandy Koufax pitched his no-hitter against the Mets in 1962, one of their 120 losses that season, Mets' coach Solly Hemus, apparently trying to jinx Koufax, kept heckling him through the game about pitching a no-hitter, according to a post-game interview Koufax gave after pitching his third no-hitter in 1964. An early biography of Koufax quoted him as telling his catcher, during that 1964 no-hitter, "Let's just go to the fastball and get this no-hit thing over with." Mickey Mantle, in an interview for Ken Burns' 1994 Baseball documentary series, related that Don Larsen, famed for his 1956 World Series perfect game, tried to talk about his no-hitter throughout the contest but much to his chagrin his Yankee teammates avoided his conversation and maintained the superstition.

When Los Angeles Angels rookie Bo Belinsky entered the final inning of his no-hitter in 1962, Baltimore Orioles outfielder Jackie Brandt passed him on the field as the teams changed sides. According to Belinsky biographer Maury Allen, Brandt told Belinsky, "Nice game, Bo, but it's over. I'm leading off with a bunt single." Belinsky got Brandt out to start the final inning of his no-hitter.

In 2009, when Mark Buehrle was pitching his perfect game, as he exited the field after the eighth inning, White Sox broadcaster Ken Harrelson exclaimed, "Call your sons! Call your daughters! Call your friends! Call your neighbors! Mark Buehrle has a perfect game going into the ninth!" Buehrle retired the side in the ninth to complete the perfect game.

When Jim Bunning was pitching his perfect game in 1964, he deliberately violated this superstition, talking to his teammates about the perfect game's progress in order to dispel the tension in the dugout.

== See also ==
- Lists of no-hitters
