= 1964 Philadelphia Phillies season =

Major League Baseball season

1964 Philadelphia Phillies
- Team photo of the 1964 Philadelphia Phillies
- League: National League
- Ballpark: Connie Mack Stadium
- City: Philadelphia, Pennsylvania
- Record: 92–70 (.568)
- League place: 2nd
- Owners: R. R. M. Carpenter Jr.
- General managers: John J. Quinn
- Managers: Gene Mauch
- Television: WFIL
- Radio: WFIL (By Saam, Bill Campbell, Richie Ashburn)

The 1964 Philadelphia Phillies season was the 82nd season for the franchise in Philadelphia. The Phillies finished in a second-place tie with the Cincinnati Reds. Both posted a record of 92–70, finishing one game behind the National League (NL) and World Series champion St. Louis Cardinals, and just two games ahead of fourth-place San Francisco. Gene Mauch managed the Phillies, who played their home games at Connie Mack Stadium.

The team is notable for being in first place in the National League since opening day, and then suffering an unthinkable collapse during the final two weeks of the season. The "Phold of '64", as it became known, is one of the most infamous collapses in baseball history.

External videos
- Struck Out: The Fall of the 1964 Phillies, 6:42, Philadelphia:The Great Experiment

== Offseason ==
- December 5, 1963: Don Demeter and Jack Hamilton were traded by the Phillies to the Detroit Tigers for Jim Bunning and Gus Triandos.

== The team ==
From 1919 through 1947, the Phillies finished last a total of 17 times and next to last seven times. A 1962 cartoon in a baseball magazine depicted a ballplayer arriving at a French Foreign Legion outpost, explaining, "I was released by the Phillies!"

Things began to change slowly beginning in 1960 when Gene Mauch was hired as manager to replace Eddie Sawyer, who had resigned after the club's opening game of the regular season. Although the Phillies slumped to 47–107 in 1961 (including a 23-game losing streak), they began to climb back to respectability in 1962 and 1963. The front office, headed by John Quinn as General Manager, had replaced most of the players of the 1950s with new, young talent.

Opening Day lineup
Number	Name	Position
8	Tony Taylor	Second base
6	Johnny Callison	Right field
15	Richie Allen	Third base
5	Roy Sievers	First base
25	Tony González	Center field
10	Danny Cater	Left field
11	Clay Dalrymple	Catcher
7	Bobby Wine	Shortstop
23	Dennis Bennett	Pitcher

Chris Short was a rookie on the 1959 team, and by the end of 1963 was the ace of the staff. He was joined by Art Mahaffey in 1960, Dennis Bennett in 1962 and Ray Culp in 1963 as starters. The bullpen had Ed Roebuck, who was purchased from the Washington Senators in April 1964, as the primary relief pitcher, along with John Boozer and Dallas Green. Rookie Rick Wise, primarily a reliever but also a spot-starter, joined the club in June. Jack Baldschun was the closer. The catching duties were platooned between Clay Dalrymple, who was the regular catcher since 1960 and Gus Triandos, who acted both as Bunning's personal catcher and as Dalrymple's backup, having come over from Detroit in the Bunning trade (below).

The infield had two fine shortstops in Bobby Wine and Rubén Amaro, and two fine second basemen in Tony Taylor and Cookie Rojas. Mauch could and did platoon them depending on the pitcher they were facing. Richie Allen (who years later would be called Dick Allen) came up in September 1963 as a rookie showing much promise, and during spring training, made the club as the starting third baseman. John Herrnstein was at first.

In the outfield Johnny Callison was in right field, Tony Gonzalez in center, and Wes Covington was in left field. Covington was first platooned with rookie Danny Cater in left; however, Cater suffered a broken arm in a game against Milwaukee on 22 July and didn't return to the lineup until late September.

The most important acquisition by the Phillies in the off-season of 1963 was the acquisition of Jim Bunning. Bunning had been with the Detroit Tigers since 1955 and was one of the best pitchers in the American League, throwing a no-hitter against the Boston Red Sox in 1958 and was a five-time All-Star. However, in 1963 he began having problems with the front office of the Tigers, and did not get along well with the Tigers' new manager, Charlie Dressen. Also, Bunning was having a mediocre season with Detroit, and Dressen believed that Bunning's career was over at the age of 31. Denny McLain, a rising star with the Tigers, began to get Bunning's starts in September and by the end of the season after going 12–13, Bunning was asking the Tiger management for a trade. His wishes were complied with, and he and Triandos were sent to the Phillies in exchange for outfielder Don Demeter and pitcher Jack Hamilton.

== Regular season ==
Throughout the 1964 season, the Phillies seemed destined to make it to the World Series. Since the beginning of the season, with an 8–2 start, the team had been in first place, and had led the National League all season, sometimes by as many as nine or ten games.

During the season Johnny Callison was having a career year and was the top contender for the National League Most Valuable Player award. Richie Allen was the leading candidate for Rookie of the Year (which he won in the postseason). In addition to his pitching, Bunning also added another dimension to the club. Chris Short had been the ace of the staff prior to Bunning joining the club. However, he never was comfortable being the leading pitcher and having that responsibility. With Bunning joining the staff, the pressure was off Short and he thrived as the number-two starter.

The 1964 National League All-Star team had three Phillies: Chris Short, Jim Bunning, and Johnny Callison. Callison was named the game's Most Valuable Player, hitting a fast ball by Boston Red Sox ace Dick Radatz into the right field stands at Shea Stadium for a 3-run home run in the 9th inning for the win. Then in early August, the Phillies acquired Frank Thomas from the New York Mets and Vic Power from Los Angeles Angels to shore up the bench for the pennant run in September. The Phillies were having their best season since the 1950 "Whiz Kids", giving "pennant fever" to their fans for the first time in 14 seasons.

=== Jim Bunning's perfect game ===
From opening day, Bunning thrived in the National League, going 6–2 in the first two months of the season, and becoming the ace of the pitching staff. On Father's Day he got the start for the first game of a doubleheader against the New York Mets, and on that day, June 21, he threw the first perfect game in the National League since 1880.

Tracy Stallard started for the Mets in the first game of the doubleheader that day. As the game progressed, Philadelphia scored single runs in both the 1st and 2nd innings and had a big inning in the 6th, scoring four runs to take a 6–0 lead. On the mound, Bunning had a strong performance against the Mets batters, striking out 10.

For perhaps the only time in the stadium's history, the Shea faithful found themselves rooting for the visitors, caught up in the rare achievement, and roaring for Bunning on every pitch in the ninth inning. His strikeout of John Stephenson for the last out capped the performance.

=== The "Phold" ===
==== Beginnings ====
On September 1 the Phillies held a 5 1/2-game lead over the Cincinnati Reds and it seemed were in cruise mode to clinching the pennant. TV Guide went to press with a World Series preview that featured a photo of Connie Mack Stadium. (Through the 1968 season, both first-place teams automatically went to the World Series, the only postseason play at the time.)

On September 7, Labor Day, the Phillies split a doubleheader with the Dodgers while the Reds lost 2 games to the St. Louis Cardinals. That increased the Phillies' lead to 6 1/2 games with 25 left to play. Then things started to go wrong, first with a string of injuries. The next game, Frank Thomas broke his right thumb sliding into second base against Maury Wills, the Dodger shortstop. The number four starter, Ray Culp, started to have problems with his right elbow; Dennis Bennett began having a sore arm. Art Mahaffey began to have control problems, being taken out in the first inning on September 8; in his next start, against the San Francisco Giants, he was taken out in the third inning.

Things appeared to settle down on September 13 when Bunning beat the Giants for his 17th win, and Short and Bennett followed up with wins over the Houston Colt .45s. However, Bunning replaced Culp for the start on the 16th for the last game against Houston and, pitching on two days' rest, gave up a two-run home run by Rusty Staub and lasted only 4 1/3 innings (charged with 4 more runs). On September 20, Bunning beat the Dodgers in Los Angeles, 3–2, throwing a five-hitter. Bunning remembered that the club had been shaky; the Phillies almost blew the game in the ninth when Vic Power made an error, leading to two unearned runs. Then Bunning finished the game by striking out the Dodger catcher, John Roseboro. After the game, a reporter from Sports Illustrated photographed Bunning. It was to be on the cover of the magazine for its World Series edition in October.

During the month, the club had gone 12–9 and the lead over the Reds remained at 6 1/2 games with 12 games to play. However, the win over the Dodgers on the 20th would be the last win by the Phillies in September.

==== "The Curse of Chico Ruiz" ====
On September 21, the team returned to Philadelphia to begin a three-game series against the Reds as part of a seven-game homestand, which included four against the Milwaukee Braves; a sweep of the Cincinnati series would clinch the pennant for the Phillies. Then they would go on the road to end the season, playing three games in St. Louis and two games in Cincinnati.

Art Mahaffey began his first start since a 9–1 loss to the Giants on the 12th, pitching against John Tsitouris in the first game against the Reds. It was a pitchers' duel until the sixth inning, when Cincinnati's Chico Ruiz hit a single, which was followed up by Vada Pinson hitting a line drive through the pitcher's box and past second base; however, Johnny Callison threw Pinson out as he tried to advance to second, while Ruiz reached third on the play. Frank Robinson then came up to bat, swinging and missing for strike one. Ruiz, on third, noted that Mahaffey had not checked him before pitching, and on the next pitch, Ruiz broke for home plate. A surprised Mahaffey pitched high and wild and the Phillies' catcher, Clay Dalrymple, jumped high but missed the ball, which went back to the screen. Ruiz successfully stole home plate, giving the Reds the lead and what would turn out to be the game's only run in a 1–0 Cincinnati victory. Richie (later Dick) Allen said of the play: "The play broke our humps."

Ruiz's steal of home has evolved into a popular culture legend. Some Philadelphia sports fans still refer to the "Curse of Chico Ruiz" as the reason for many of their teams' misfortunes.

==== The Collapse ====
In the next game, manager Gene Mauch rode Robinson, Ruiz and the rest of the Reds hard from the dugout, yelling over at them constantly about Ruiz and his stealing home the night before. The Reds responded with Frank Robinson hitting a two-run homer off Chris Short, who had to be taken out in the fifth inning. The Phillies lost and their lead was down to 4 1/2 games. In the third game of the series with the Reds, things went from bad to worse, when Dennis Bennett lasted six innings with a sore arm as the Phillies lost again, 6–4, with Pinson and Ruiz hitting home runs. The lead was now down to 3 1/2 games.

Milwaukee came in next and Bunning was the starter in game one. Joe Torre drove in three runs with two triples due to misplays in the outfield in a 5–3 loss, the fourth in a row. Then Chris Short pitched on two days' rest in the next game, the Phillies lost, and the losing streak was at five, with the lead now down to a game-and-a-half. The Braves then beat the Phillies, 6–4 (Art Mahaffey starting for the Phillies), and the lead dropped to a half-game over the Reds. Bunning then came in for game four, also pitching on two days' rest, and lasted three innings in a 14–8 loss. With the fourth loss against the Braves and the 7th loss in a row, the Phillies dropped to second and the Reds, having swept a doubleheader, took first place by 1 game. The Cardinals were right behind, a game-and-a-half out of first place. The Phillies had lost every game of their last homestand of the season.

The crucial series came when the now second-place Phillies traveled to St. Louis to play the Cardinals after their losing home stand. They dropped the first game of the series to Bob Gibson by a 5–1 score, their eighth loss in a row, dropping them to third place. The Cardinals would sweep the three-game set and assume first place for good.

The losing streak ended in Cincinnati during the last two games of the season with wins of 4–3 and 10–0 over the Reds. However, there were no playoffs in 1964 and the second-place Phillies ended the season at 92–70, tied with the Reds. It was the best season by the Phillies since the 1950 pennant-winning Whiz Kids, but there was no joy in the City of Brotherly Love. The "Phold", as the ten-game loss streak is known, is one of the most notable collapses in sports history.

=== Epilogue ===
==== Richie Allen ====
Richie Allen (later known as Dick Allen) had one of the greatest seasons by a rookie ever in major league baseball in 1964. He led the National League in runs (125), triples (13), extra base hits (80) and total bases (352); he finished in the top five in batting average (.318), slugging average (.557), hits (201), and doubles (38); and won Rookie of the Year. Allen boasted a powerful and muscular physique, and 18 of his 29 home runs cleared Connie Mack Stadium's 65-foot-high left field grandstand, and twice cleared that park's 65-foot-high right center field scoreboard, a feat considered virtually impossible for a right-handed hitter.

Allen was also one of the most controversial players in Philadelphia for some notable non-baseball incidents. Allen spoke his mind, combatted racism, and bucked organizational hierarchy; he almost ended his career in 1967 after mangling his throwing hand by pushing it through a car headlight. Allen was fined $2,500 and suspended indefinitely in 1969 when he failed to appear for the Phillies twi-night doubleheader game with the New York Mets. (He would be reinstated, and, despite wanting to be traded, agreed to finish the season with the Phillies.) Allen had gone to New Jersey in the morning to see a horse race, and got caught in traffic trying to return. He was traded after the 1969 season to the Cardinals for Curt Flood. Even this caused controversy, though not of Allen's making. Flood refused to report to the Phillies and subsequently sued Major League Baseball in an unsuccessful attempt to overthrow the reserve clause and to be declared a free agent (Flood's lawsuit failed; however, the reserve clause was thrown out in 1975). After leaving the Phillies, he asked to be called "Dick", saying Richie was a little boy's name. He played for several teams, and then went into a controversial retirement in 1974.

Early in the 1975 season, Phillies general manager Paul Owens wanted a right-handed power hitter and a first baseman. Both Mike Schmidt and Dave Cash lobbied Owens to acquire Dick Allen. Allen had to be persuaded by several of his future teammates that both the organizational and racial climate in Philadelphia had changed for the better since his 1969 departure from the team. On May 4, the Phillies traded their first baseman Willie Montañez (who came from the Cardinals in 1970 as compensation after Curt Flood refused to report as part of the Allen trade) to the Giants for Garry Maddox which provided a bat for the outfield and opened first for Allen. The Phillies acquired Allen three days later on May 7, 1975.

Allen found Veterans Stadium much to his liking, putting several home-run balls into the far parts of the upper deck. He was part of the 1976 Phillies National League East Championship team, before leaving for the Oakland Athletics for his final season in 1977. Allen was inducted into the Baseball Hall of Fame in 2025.

==== Jim Bunning ====
The perfect game was the highlight of the Philadelphia career of Bunning, who became a fan favorite and the club's ace starter for the next four seasons, being one of the most dominant pitchers in the Major Leagues. From 1964 through 1967, Bunning led MLB pitchers in fWAR and innings pitched, ranked second in the NL in wins, ranked second in the NL in games started, and ranked third in the NL in ERA. He was traded to the Pittsburgh Pirates prior to the 1968 season, was briefly with the Dodgers, then returned to the Phillies for two mediocre seasons during 1970 and 1971. He pitched the first game at Veterans Stadium in April 1971, beating the Montreal Expos. Largely on account of the perfect game and three 19-win seasons (1964–1966) with the Phillies, today Bunning is memorialized in the Philadelphia Baseball Wall of Fame (1984), and was inducted into the Baseball Hall of Fame by the Veterans' Committee in 1996.

Thirty years later, Bunning, by then a member of Congress, talked about The "Phold" to David Halberstam and said that to understand what happened, you had to be there and be caught up in the emotions and excitement of the pennant race. Also, there was a belief by the Phillies that they could prevail simply by sheer will. Pitching on short rest, the injuries, and the reality of pitching with a good deal more fatigue than he recognized all led to a loss of confidence. Players began to have doubts when before there were no doubts. The team began to run the bases poorly and throw badly, missing easy plays and making errors they would not normally have made.

==== Rick Wise ====
Rick Wise, who won the second game against the Mets after Bunning's perfect game, became a solid starter and the ace of the Phillies pitching staff in the years after the 1964 season. In 1971 he threw a no-hitter against the Reds and hit two home runs in the game at Riverfront Stadium. As a result of a salary dispute, he was traded by the Phillies in the spring of 1972 to the Cardinals for Steve Carlton, who was also having salary issues. Carlton went on to anchor the Phillies' pitching staff for the next thirteen seasons, ultimately winning 329 games and a place in the Baseball Hall of Fame. Wise went from the Cardinals to the Red Sox in 1974. He was the winning pitcher for the Red Sox in Game 6 of the 1975 World Series over the Cincinnati Reds, considered by some to be the greatest Series game ever played.

Wise was the last member of the 1964 Philadelphia Phillies team to be active in the major leagues, pitching 2 innings of relief (7th and 8th innings) for the San Diego Padres against the Los Angeles Dodgers on 10 April 1982.

==== Echoes of the 1964 season ====
The Phillies finished sixth in the National League in 1965, and began to slide back into mediocrity. It was not until the 1976 season, twelve seasons later, that the Phillies won the National League Eastern Division Championship; losing to the Reds in the playoffs (Dick Allen and Tony Taylor were part of the 1976 Phillies). The 1977 and 1978 teams also won the National League East, but both lost to the Dodgers in the playoffs; it was not until the 1980 Philadelphia Phillies (managed by 1964 alumnus Dallas Green, with Bobby Wine and Rubén Amaro as coaches) won both the National League Pennant against the Houston Astros and also the World Series against the Kansas City Royals that the stigma of the 1964 "Phold" was fully erased after sixteen seasons.

The 1964 Phillies are immortalized in American pop culture via numerous book chapters, magazine articles, and newspaper columns. At least three full-length books are devoted to the 1964 Phillies: non-fiction books The 1964 Phillies: The Story of Baseball's Most Memorable Collapse by John P. Rossi and September Swoon: Richie Allen, the '64 Phillies, and Racial Integration by William C. Kashatis; and a novel based on the 1964 Phillies collapse titled '64 Intruder, by Gregory T. Glading, which centers on a Phillies fan going back in time and preventing Chico Ruiz from stealing home in the "Phold's" first loss. A 2014 Twitter feed @epic64collapse provides a day-by-day account of the entire season.

The Philadelphia Baseball Wall of Fame honors no less than five 1964 Phillies players: Richie Allen, Jim Bunning, Johnny Callison, Dallas Green and Tony Taylor. Manager Gene Mauch is also honored.

=== Notable transactions ===
- April 6, 1964: Darrell Sutherland was selected off waivers from the Phillies by the New York Mets as a first-year waiver pick.
- June 19, 1964: Joe Lis was signed as an amateur free agent by the Phillies.
- August 7, 1964: Wayne Graham, Gary Kroll, and cash were traded by the Phillies to the New York Mets for Frank Thomas.

=== Season standings ===
National League
Team	W	L	Pct.	GB	Home	Road
St. Louis Cardinals	93	69	.574	—	48‍–‍33	45‍–‍36
Philadelphia Phillies	92	70	.568	1	46‍–‍35	46‍–‍35
Cincinnati Reds	92	70	.568	1	47‍–‍34	45‍–‍36
San Francisco Giants	90	72	.556	3	44‍–‍37	46‍–‍35
Milwaukee Braves	88	74	.543	5	45‍–‍36	43‍–‍38
Pittsburgh Pirates	80	82	.494	13	42‍–‍39	38‍–‍43
Los Angeles Dodgers	80	82	.494	13	41‍–‍40	39‍–‍42
Chicago Cubs	76	86	.469	17	40‍–‍41	36‍–‍45
Houston Colt .45s	66	96	.407	27	41‍–‍40	25‍–‍56
New York Mets	53	109	.327	40	33‍–‍48	20‍–‍61

=== Record vs. opponents ===
1964 National League record Sources:
Team	CHC	CIN	HOU	LAD	MIL	NYM	PHI	PIT	SF	STL
Chicago	—	6–12	11–7	10–8	8–10	11–7	6–12	9–9	9–9	6–12
Cincinnati	12–6	—	12–6	14–4–1	9–9	11–7	9–9	8–10	7–11	10–8
Houston	7–11	6–12	—	7–11	12–6	9–9	5–13	5–13	7–11	8–10
Los Angeles	8–10	4–14–1	11–7	—	8–10	15–3–1	8–10	10–8	6–12	10–8
Milwaukee	10–8	9–9	6–12	10–8	—	14–4	10–8	12–6	9–9	8–10
New York	7–11	7–11	9–9	3–15–1	4–14	—	3–15	6–12	7–11	7–11
Philadelphia	12–6	9–9	13–5	10–8	8–10	15–3	—	10–8	10–8	5–13
Pittsburgh	9–9	10–8	13–5	8–10	6–12	12–6	8–10	—	8–10	6–12
San Francisco	9–9	11–7	11–7	12–6	9–9	11–7	8–10	10–8	—	9–9
St. Louis	12–6	8–10	10–8	8–10	10–8	11–7	13–5	12–6	9–9	—

=== Game log ===
1964 game log (Overall Record: 92–70)
April (9–2)

#	Date	Opponent	Score	Win	Loss	Save	Attendance	Record
1	April 14	Mets	5–3	**Johnny Klippstein** (1–0)	Al Jackson (0–1)	None	21,016	1–0
2	April 15	Mets	4–1	**Jim Bunning** (1–0)	Tracy Stallard (0–1)	None	8,528	2–0
3	April 17	@ Cubs	10–8	**Johnny Klippstein** (2–0)	Dick Ellsworth (0–1)	**Jack Baldschun** (1)	18,868	3–0
4	April 18	@ Cubs	0–7	Bob Buhl (1–0)	**Ray Culp** (0–1)	None	9,256	3–1
5	April 19	@ Cubs	8–1	**Dennis Bennett** (1–0)	Larry Jackson (1–1)	None	7,296	4–1
–	April 20	@ Mets	Postponed (rain); Makeup: June 19 as a traditional double-header					
–	April 21	@ Mets	Postponed (rain, cold, and wet grounds); Makeup: August 14 as a traditional double-header					
–	April 22	Pirates	Postponed (rain); Makeup: August 20 as a traditional double-header					
6	April 23	Pirates	6–5	**Jack Baldschun** (1–0)	Roy Face (2–2)	None	12,851	5–1
7	April 24	Cubs	10–0	**Jim Bunning** (2–0)	Bob Buhl (1–1)	None	15,255	6–1
8	April 25	Cubs	1–4	Larry Jackson (2–1)	**Dennis Bennett** (1–1)	Lindy McDaniel (2)	17,316	6–2
9	April 26	Cubs	5–1	**Ray Culp** (1–1)	Fred Norman (0–2)	**Ed Roebuck** (1)	12,522	7–2
10	April 28	@ Reds	4–2	**Art Mahaffey** (1–0)	Jim O'Toole (2–1)	**Chris Short** (1)	5,117	8–2
–	April 29	@ Reds	Postponed (rain); Makeup: July 20					
11	April 30	@ Reds	3–1	**Dennis Bennett** (2–1)	Joe Nuxhall (1–2)	None	2,821	9–2

May (16–13)

#	Date	Opponent	Score	Win	Loss	Save	Attendance	Record
12	May 1	@ Braves	5–3	**Jim Bunning** (3–0)	Warren Spahn (1–2)	**Ed Roebuck** (2)	4,727	10–2
13	May 2	@ Braves	2–11	Bob Sadowski (2–2)	**Ray Culp** (1–2)	None	6,174	10–3
14	May 3	@ Braves	0–1	Hank Fischer (3–9)	**Art Mahaffey** (1–1)	None	14,753	10–4
15	May 4	@ Cardinals	2–9	Roger Craig (2–0)	**Dennis Bennett** (2–2)	None	7,437	10–5
16	May 5	@ Cardinals	1–2	Ray Washburn (1–0)	**Jim Bunning** (3–1)	Ron Taylor (1)	10,443	10–6
17	May 6	Braves	7–6	**Ed Roebuck** (1–0)	Bobby Tiefenauer (1–1)	None	14,331	11–6
18	May 7	Braves	9–6	**Art Mahaffey** (2–1)	Hank Fischer (3–1)	**Jack Baldschun** (2)	11,749	12–6
19	May 8	Reds	11–3	**Dennis Bennett** (3–2)	John Tsitouris (1–2)	None	23,004	13–6
20	May 9	Reds	5–4	**Dallas Green** (1–0)	Bob Purkey (0–2)	**Ed Roebuck** (3)	8,142	14–6
21	May 10	Reds	0–2	Joe Nuxhall (2–2)	**Chris Short** (0–1)	None	11,642	14–7
22	May 11	Cardinals	2–3	Ray Sadecki (1–3)	**Ray Culp** (1–3)	None	11,200	14–8
23	May 12	Cardinals	2–4	Curt Simmons (4–2)	**Art Mahaffey** (2–2)	Roger Craig (3)	14,412	14–9
–	May 13	Cardinals	Postponed (rain); Makeup: September 10					
24	May 14	Cardinals	3–2	**Jim Bunning** (4–1)	Ernie Broglio (2–2)	**Ed Roebuck** (4)	16,626	15–9
25	May 15	@ Colt .45s	4–0	**Dennis Bennett** (4–2)	Don Nottebart (0–5)	None	8,945	16–9
26	May 16	@ Colt .45s	3–4	Turk Farrell (5–1)	**Ray Culp** (1–4)	Hal Woodeshick (7)	11,331	16–10
27	May 17	@ Colt .45s	2–0	**Chris Short** (1–1)	Jim Owens (1–3)	None	7,784	17–10
28	May 18	@ Colt .45s	4–0	**Jim Bunning** (5–1)	Ken Johnson (3–4)	None	5,284	18–10
29	May 19	@ Giants	0–3	Jack Sanford (4–3)	**Dennis Bennett** (4–3)	None	16,936	18–11
30	May 20	@ Giants	7–2	**Jack Baldschun** (2–0)	Juan Marichal (6–1)	None	12,284	19–11
31	May 21	@ Giants	4–9	Bobby Bolin (1–1)	**Johnny Klippstein** (2–1)	None	11,222	19–12
32	May 22	@ Dodgers	2–0	**Chris Short** (2–1)	Don Drysdale (5–3)	None	38,920	20–12
33	May 23	@ Dodgers	4–2 (14)	**Dennis Bennett** (5–3)	Ron Perranoski (2–1)	**Jack Baldschun** (3)	42,349	21–12
34	May 24	@ Dodgers	0–3	Joe Moeller (2–3)	**Jim Bunning** (5–2)	Sandy Koufax (1)	36,900	21–13
35	May 26	@ Pirates	4–13	Vern Law (2–4)	**Chris Short** (2–2)	None	12,183	21–14
36	May 27	@ Pirates	2–0	**Art Mahaffey** (3–2)	Bob Friend (4–4)	None	10,914	22–14
37	May 28	@ Pirates	5–6	Al McBean (2–0)	**Jack Baldschun** (2–1)	None	8,649	22–15
38	May 29	Colt .45s	7–6	**Dennis Bennett** (6–3)	Hal Woodeshick (1–3)	**Ed Roebuck** (5)	13,067	23–15
39	May 30	Colt .45s	5–1	**Chris Short** (3–2)	Don Nottebart (0–7)	None	19,046	24–15
40	May 31	Colt .45s	4–1	**Art Mahaffey** (4–2)	Jim Owens (1–4)	**Ed Roebuck** (6)	8,154	25–15

June (18–12)

#	Date	Opponent	Score	Win	Loss	Save	Attendance	Record
41	June 2	Dodgers	4–3	**Dennis Bennett** (7–3)	Jim Brewer (0–1)	**Ed Roebuck** (7)	22,317	26–15
42	June 3	Dodgers	1–0 (11)	**Jack Baldschun** (3–1)	Don Drysdale (6–5)	None	20,961	27–15
43	June 4	Dodgers	0–3	Sandy Koufax (6–4)	**Chris Short** (3–3)	None	29,709	27–16
44	June 5	Giants	3–5 (11)	Bob Shaw (4–3)	**Jack Baldschun** (3–2)	Ron Herbel (1)	31,774	27–17
45	June 6	Giants	2–4	Billy O'Dell (1–1)	**Ed Roebuck** (1–1)	None	13,286	27–18
46	June 7	Giants	3–4 (10)	Bob Shaw (5–3)	**Ed Roebuck** (1–2)	Billy Pierce (1)	27,675	27–19
47	June 9 (1)	Pirates	4–3	**Art Mahaffey** (5–2)	Joe Gibbon (3–2)	**Ed Roebuck** (8)	see 2nd game	28–19
48	June 9 (2)	Pirates	0–4	Steve Blass (3–2)	**Ray Culp** (1–5)	None	32,155	28–20
49	June 10	Pirates	4–1	**Chris Short** (4–3)	Bob Friend (4–6)	None	15,352	29–20
50	June 12	Mets	3–11	Tracy Stallard (4–7)	**Dennis Bennett** (7–4)	None	16,661	29–21
51	June 13	Mets	8–2	**Jim Bunning** (6–2)	Frank Lary (0–3)	None	4,875	30–21
52	June 14 (1)	Mets	9–5	**Ray Culp** (2–5)	Galen Cisco (3–7)	None	see 2nd game	31–21
53	June 14 (2)	Mets	4–2	**Art Mahaffey** (6–2)	Al Jackson (3–9)	**Ed Roebuck** (9)	21,020	32–21
54	June 16	@ Cubs	4–2	**Dennis Bennett** (8–4)	Larry Jackson (8–5)	**Jack Baldschun** (4)	8,744	33–21
55	June 17	@ Cubs	5–9	Bob Buhl (8–3)	**Jack Baldschun** (3–3)	Lindy McDaniel (7)	9,106	33–22
56	June 18	@ Cubs	6–3	**Chris Short** (5–3)	Dick Ellsworth (8–6)	**Jim Bunning** (1)	9,283	34–22
57	June 19 (1)	@ Mets	2–1	**Art Mahaffey** (7–2)	Larry Bearnarth (4–4)	**Ed Roebuck** (10)	see 2nd game	35–22
58	June 19 (2)	@ Mets	7–2	**Ray Culp** (3–5)	Galen Cisco (3–8)	None	41,310	36–22
59	June 20	@ Mets	3–7	Jack Fisher (5–5)	**Dallas Green** (1–1)	Al Jackson (1)	18,004	36–23
60	June 21 (1)	@ Mets	6–0	**Jim Bunning** (7–2)	Tracy Stallard (4–9)	None	see 2nd game	37–23
61	June 21 (2)	@ Mets	8–2	**Rick Wise** (1–0)	Frank Lary (0–4)	**Johnny Klippstein** (1)	32,026	38–23
62	June 23 (1)	Cubs	0–2	Dick Ellsworth (9–6)	**Chris Short** (5–4)	None	see 2nd game	38–24
63	June 23 (2)	Cubs	9–0	**Ray Culp** (4–5)	Sterling Slaughter (2–2)	None	35,483	39–24
64	June 24	Cubs	9–8	**Dallas Green** (2–1)	Ernie Broglio (3–7)	None	19,711	40–24
65	June 26	@ Cardinals	6–5	**Ed Roebuck** (2–2)	Ron Taylor (1–2)	None	18,484	41–24
66	June 27	@ Cardinals	4–9	Curt Simmons (8–6)	**Rick Wise** (1–1)	None	12,388	41–25
67	June 28 (1)	@ Cardinals	5–0	**Chris Short** (6–4)	Mike Cuellar (0–1)	None	see 2nd game	42–25
68	June 28 (2)	@ Cardinals	2–8	Ray Sadecki (8–6)	**Ray Culp** (4–6)	None	27,805	42–26
69	June 29	@ Colt .45s	1–6	Bob Bruce (8–4)	**Art Mahaffey** (7–3)	None	11,103	42–27
70	June 30	@ Colt .45s	8–1	**Jim Bunning** (8–2)	Ken Johnson (6–7)	None	16,414	43–27

July (16–14)

#	Date	Opponent	Score	Win	Loss	Save	Attendance	Record
71	July 1	@ Dodgers	2–3	Sandy Koufax (11–4)	**Dennis Bennett** (8–5)	None	39,823	43–28
72	July 2	@ Dodgers	3–2	**Chris Short** (7–4)	Phil Ortega (3–3)	**Jack Baldschun** (5)	35,541	44–28
73	July 3	@ Giants	5–1	**Ray Culp** (5–6)	Ron Herbel (6–4)	None	27,068	45–28
74	July 4	@ Giants	5–2 (11)	**Jim Bunning** (9–2)	Gaylord Perry (6–4)	**Jack Baldschun** (6)	30,529	46–28
75	July 5	@ Giants	2–1	**Dennis Bennett** (9–5)	Juan Marichal (11–4)	**Jack Baldschun** (7)	38,641	47–28
–	July 7	**1964 Major League Baseball All-Star Game** at Shea Stadium in Queens						
76	July 9	Reds	4–3	**Ray Culp** (6–6)	John Tsitouris (5–6)	**Jack Baldschun** (8)	18,404	48–28
77	July 10	Reds	1–5	Jim O'Toole (9–4)	**Dennis Bennett** (9–6)	None	25,936	48–29
78	July 11	Reds	1–3	Joe Nuxhall (7–4)	**Jim Bunning** (9–3)	Sammy Ellis (2)	10,146	48–30
79	July 12 (1)	Braves	3–4	Wade Blasingame (2–1)	**Chris Short** (7–5)	Chi-Chi Olivo (2)	see 2nd game	48–31
80	July 12 (2)	Braves	2–6	Billy Hoeft (3–0)	**Art Mahaffey** (7–4)	None	28,044	48–32
81	July 13	Braves	3–2	**Ray Culp** (7–6)	Warren Spahn (6–9)	**Jim Bunning** (2)	13,817	49–32
82	July 14	@ Pirates	3–4	Bob Veale (9–6)	**Cal McLish** (0–1)	Al McBean (12)	9,664	49–33
83	July 15	@ Pirates	0–3	Bob Friend (8–8)	**Jim Bunning** (9–4)	None	11,633	49–34
84	July 16	@ Pirates	7–5	**Art Mahaffey** (8–4)	Joe Gibbon (6–3)	**Jack Baldschun** (9)	12,163	50–34
85	July 17	@ Reds	5–4	**Chris Short** (8–5)	Joey Jay (4–7)	**Dennis Bennett** (1)	19,008	51–34
86	July 18	@ Reds	4–14	John Tsitouris (6–6)	**Ray Culp** (7–7)	None	8,251	51–35
87	July 19 (1)	@ Reds	4–7	Billy McCool (3–0)	**Jack Baldschun** (3–4)	Sammy Ellis (4)	see 2nd game	51–36
88	July 19 (2)	@ Reds	4–3	**John Boozer** (1–0)	Ryne Duren (0–2)	**Chris Short** (2)	27,245	52–36
89	July 20	@ Reds	2–6	Joe Nuxhall (8–4)	**Dennis Bennett** (9–7)	Billy McCool (4)	10,229	52–37
90	July 21	@ Braves	6–3	**Art Mahaffey** (9–4)	Wade Blasingame (2–2)	**Jack Baldschun** (10)	22,110	53–37
91	July 22	@ Braves	4–1	**Ray Culp** (8–7)	Warren Spahn (6–11)	**Jack Baldschun** (11)	20,457	54–37
92	July 23	@ Braves	13–10 (10)	**Jack Baldschun** (4–4)	Bobby Tiefenauer (3–5)	**Dennis Bennett** (2)	10,507	55–37
93	July 24	Cardinals	9–1	**Chris Short** (9–5)	Bob Gibson (8–8)	None	22,628	56–37
94	July 25	Cardinals	9–10	Curt Simmons (10–8)	**Dennis Bennett** (9–8)	Mike Cuellar (2)	10,948	56–38
95	July 26 (1)	Cardinals	1–6	Gordie Richardson (1–0)	**John Boozer** (1–1)	None	see 2nd game	56–39
96	July 26 (2)	Cardinals	1–4	Ray Sadecki (11–8)	**Art Mahaffey** (9–5)	None	28,118	56–40
97	July 28	Giants	4–0	**Jim Bunning** (10–4)	Billy O'Dell (3–4)	**Jack Baldschun** (12)	29,386	57–40
98	July 29	Giants	3–6 (10)	Juan Marichal (15–5)	**Jack Baldschun** (4–5)	None	27,979	57–41
99	July 30	Giants	4–3 (10)	**Art Mahaffey** (10–5)	Gaylord Perry (7–8)	None	27,694	58–41
100	July 31	Dodgers	6–1	**Chris Short** (10–5)	Joe Moeller (5–10)	**Jack Baldschun** (13)	24,197	59–41

August (19–10)

#	Date	Opponent	Score	Win	Loss	Save	Attendance	Record
101	August 1	Dodgers	10–6	**Rick Wise** (2–1)	Don Drysdale (13–10)	**Ed Roebuck** (11)	32,030	60–41
102	August 2	Dodgers	1–6	Larry Miller (2–2)	**John Boozer** (1–2)	None	18,802	60–42
–	August 3	Dodgers	Postponed (rain); Makeup: September 8					
103	August 5 (1)	Colt .45s	4–1	**Jim Bunning** (11–4)	Bob Bruce (11–6)	**Jack Baldschun** (14)	see 2nd game	61–42
104	August 5 (2)	Colt .45s	2–1	**Ed Roebuck** (3–2)	Hal Woodeshick (2–7)	None	27,288	62–42
105	August 6	Colt .45s	1–2	Turk Farrell (11–7)	**Chris Short** (10–6)	Jim Owens (2)	15,083	62–43
106	August 7	Mets	9–4	**Ed Roebuck** (4–2)	Bill Wakefield (3–4)	**Jack Baldschun** (15)	14,158	63–43
107	August 8	Mets	12–5	**Rick Wise** (3–1)	Galen Cisco (4–13)	**John Boozer** (1)	7,687	64–43
108	August 9	Mets	6–0	**Jim Bunning** (12–4)	Tracy Stallard (6–15)	None	11,621	65–43
109	August 11	@ Cubs	13–5	**John Boozer** (2–2)	Dick Ellsworth (12–14)	None	11,972	66–43
110	August 12	@ Cubs	6–5	**Chris Short** (11–6)	Larry Jackson (14–10)	**Jack Baldschun** (16)	8,633	67–43
111	August 13	@ Cubs	1–3	Ernie Broglio (7–9)	**Dennis Bennett** (9–9)	None	8,347	67–44
112	August 14 (1)	@ Mets	6–1	**Jim Bunning** (13–4)	Al Jackson (6–12)	None	see 2nd game	68–44
113	August 14 (2)	@ Mets	6–4	**Rick Wise** (4–1)	Tracy Stallard (6–16)	**Jack Baldschun** (17)	42,806	69–44
114	August 15	@ Mets	8–1	**John Boozer** (2–3)	Jack Fisher (8–15)	None	31,324	70–44
115	August 16	@ Mets	4–12	Galen Cisco (5–13)	**Art Mahaffey** (10–6)	None	24,486	70–45
116	August 17	Cubs	8–1	**Chris Short** (12–6)	Ernie Broglio (7–10)	None	17,355	71–45
117	August 18	Cubs	3–4 (16)	Freddie Burdette (1–0)	**John Boozer** (3–3)	Ernie Broglio (1)	18,401	71–46
118	August 19	Cubs	9–5	**Jack Baldschun** (5–5)	Lindy McDaniel (1–6)	None	18,140	72–46
119	August 20 (1)	Pirates	2–0	**Art Mahaffey** (11–6)	Bob Friend (10–13)	None	see 2nd game	73–46
120	August 20 (2)	Pirates	3–2	**Rick Wise** (5–1)	Don Schwall (4–3)	**Ed Roebuck** (12)	35,814	74–46
121	August 21	Pirates	2–0	**Chris Short** (13–6)	Bob Veale (13–10)	None	30,170	75–46
122	August 22	Pirates	4–9	Frank Bork (2–0)	**Dennis Bennett** (9–10)	Al McBean (17)	14,955	75–47
123	August 23	Pirates	9–3	**Jim Bunning** (14–4)	Joe Gibbon (9–6)	**John Boozer** (2)	19,213	76–47
124	August 24	@ Braves	9–12	Bob Sadowski (8–8)	**Dennis Bennett** (9–11)	None	11,726	76–48
125	August 25	@ Braves	5–7	Tony Cloninger (13–12)	**Rick Wise** (5–2)	Billy Hoeft (4)	16,248	76–49
126	August 26	@ Braves	6–1	**Chris Short** (14–6)	Denny Lemaster (13–9)	None	12,158	77–49
127	August 28	@ Pirates	2–4	Roy Face (3–3)	**Ed Roebuck** (4–3)	None	20,374	77–50
128	August 29	@ Pirates	10–8	**Art Mahaffey** (12–6)	Bob Friend (10–15)	**Jack Baldschun** (18)	12,186	78–50
129	August 30	@ Pirates	2–10	Bob Veale (14–10)	**Chris Short** (14–7)	None	14,080	78–51

September (12–19)

#	Date	Opponent	Score	Win	Loss	Save	Attendance	Record
130	September 1	Colt .45s	4–3	**Jim Bunning** (15–4)	Hal Brown (2–14)	None	13,306	79–51
131	September 2	Colt .45s	2–1	**Chris Short** (15–7)	Don Nottebart (6–9)	None	12,616	80–51
132	September 3	Colt .45s	0–6	Don Larsen (3–6)	**Dennis Bennett** (9–12)	None	12,908	80–52
133	September 4	Giants	5–3	**Jack Baldschun** (6–5)	Billy O'Dell (8–7)	None	28,149	81–52
134	September 5	Giants	9–3	**Jim Bunning** (16–4)	Bobby Bolin (5–7)	None	31,482	82–52
135	September 6	Giants	3–4	Juan Marichal (17–6)	**Jack Baldschun** (6–6)	None	21,548	82–53
136	September 7 (1)	Dodgers	5–1	**Dennis Bennett** (10–12)	Larry Miller (3–7)	None	see 2nd game	83–53
137	September 7 (2)	Dodgers	1–3	Pete Richert (1–1)	**Rick Wise** (5–3)	Ron Perranoski (11)	26,390	83–54
138	September 8	Dodgers	2–3	Jim Brewer (2–2)	**Art Mahaffey** (12–7)	Ron Perranoski (12)	14,594	83–55
139	September 9	Cardinals	5–10 (11)	Bob Humphreys (2–0)	**Jack Baldschun** (6–7)	None	25,339	83–56
140	September 10	Cardinals	5–1	**Chris Short** (16–7)	Ray Sadecki (16–10)	None	14,552	84–56
141	September 11	@ Giants	1–0	**Dennis Bennett** (11–12)	Juan Marichal (17–7)	None	27,524	85–56
142	September 12	@ Giants	1–9	Gaylord Perry (11–9)	**Art Mahaffey** (12–8)	None	29,463	85–57
143	September 13	@ Giants	4–1 (10)	**Jim Bunning** (17–4)	Dick Estelle (0–1)	None	35,205	86–57
144	September 14	@ Colt .45s	4–1	**Chris Short** (17–7)	Bob Bruce (13–9)	None	4,909	87–57
145	September 15	@ Colt .45s	1–0	**Dennis Bennett** (12–12)	Ken Johnson (10–16)	**Jack Baldschun** (19)	4,161	88–57
146	September 16	@ Colt .45s	5–6	Hal Brown (3–15)	**Jim Bunning** (17–5)	Hal Woodeshick (23)	2,289	88–58
147	September 17	@ Dodgers	4–3	**Bobby Shantz** (2–4)	Don Drysdale (18–14)	**Jack Baldschun** (20)	21,175	89–58
148	September 18	@ Dodgers	3–4	Bob Miller (7–6)	**Jack Baldschun** (6–8)	None	26,341	89–59
149	September 19	@ Dodgers	3–4 (16)	Phil Ortega (7–9)	**Jack Baldschun** (6–9)	None	27,146	89–60
150	September 20	@ Dodgers	3–2	**Jim Bunning** (18–5)	Jim Brewer (2–3)	None	25,867	90–60
151	September 21	Reds	0–1	John Tsitouris (8–11)	**Art Mahaffey** (12–9)	None	20,067	90–61
152	September 22	Reds	2–9	Jim O'Toole (16–7)	**Chris Short** (17–8)	None	21,232	90–62
153	September 23	Reds	4–6	Billy McCool (6–3)	**Dennis Bennett** (12–13)	Sammy Ellis (11)	23,247	90–63
154	September 24	Braves	3–5	Wade Blasingame (7–5)	**Jim Bunning** (18–6)	Chi-Chi Olivo (4)	17,342	90–64
155	September 25	Braves	5–7 (12)	Clay Carroll (1–0)	**John Boozer** (3–4)	Tony Cloninger (2)	30,447	90–65
156	September 26	Braves	4–6	Wade Blasingame (8–5)	**Bobby Shantz** (2–5)	Warren Spahn (2)	14,330	90–66
157	September 27	Braves	8–14	Tony Cloninger (18–14)	**Jim Bunning** (18–7)	Chi-Chi Olivo (5)	20,569	90–67
158	September 28	@ Cardinals	1–5	Bob Gibson (18–11)	**Chris Short** (17–9)	Barney Schultz (12)	24,146	90–68
159	September 29	@ Cardinals	2–4	Ray Sadecki (20–10)	**Dennis Bennett** (12–14)	Barney Schultz (13)	27,433	90–69
160	September 30	@ Cardinals	5–8	Curt Simmons (18–9)	**Jim Bunning** (18–8)	Gordie Richardson (1)	29,920	90–70

October (2–0)

#	Date	Opponent	Score	Win	Loss	Save	Attendance	Record
161	October 2	@ Reds	4–3	**Ed Roebuck** (5–3)	Billy McCool (6–5)	**Jack Baldschun** (21)	25,221	91–70
162	October 4	@ Reds	10–0	**Jim Bunning** (19–8)	John Tsitouris (9–13)	None	28,535	92–70

- Phillies win
- Phillies loss
- Postponement
- Eliminated from NL pennant
- Bold: Phillies team member

=== Roster ===
1964 Philadelphia Phillies
**Roster**
**Pitchers**: 27 Jack Baldschun; 59 Dave Bennett; 23 Dennis Bennett; 19 John Boozer; 14 Jim Bunning; 37 Ray Culp; 18 Ryne Duren; 46 Dallas Green; 45 Johnny Klippstein; 55 Gary Kroll; 19 Bobby Locke; 28 Art Mahaffey; 26 Cal McLish; 17 Ed Roebuck; 35 Bobby Shantz; 41 Chris Short; 58 Morrie Steevens; 18 Rick Wise	**Catchers**: 11 Clay Dalrymple; 9 Gus Triandos; **Infielders**: 15 Dick Allen; 20 Rubén Amaro; 62 Vic Power; 31 Costen Shockley; 5 Roy Sievers; 8 Tony Taylor; 45 Frank Thomas; 7 Bobby Wine	**Outfielders**: 12 Johnny Briggs; 6 Johnny Callison; 10 Danny Cater; 43 Wes Covington; 25 Tony González; 22 John Herrnstein; 26 Alex Johnson; 54 Adolfo Phillips; 16 Cookie Rojas; **Other batters**: 29 Pat Corrales; 12 Don Hoak	**Manager**: 4 Gene Mauch; **Coaches**: 3 Peanuts Lowrey; 1 George Myatt; 5 Bob Oldis; 2 Al Widmar

== Player stats ==
= Indicates team leader

=== Batting ===
==== Starters by position ====
Note: Pos = Position; G = Games played; AB = At bats; R = Runs; H = Hits; Avg. = Batting average; HR = Home runs; RBI = Runs batted In; SB = Stolen bases

Pos	Player	G	AB	R	H	Avg.	HR	RBI	SB
C	Clay Dalrymple	127	382	36	91	.238	6	46	0
1B	John Herrnstein	125	303	38	71	.234	6	25	1
2B	Tony Taylor	154	570	62	143	.251	4	46	13
3B	Dick Allen	162	632	125	201	.318	29	91	3
SS	Bobby Wine	126	283	28	60	.212	4	34	1
LF	Wes Covington	129	339	37	95	.280	13	58	0
CF	Tony González	131	421	55	117	.278	4	40	0
RF	Johnny Callison	162	654	101	179	.274	31	104	6

==== Other batters ====
Note: G = Games played; AB = At bats; R = Runs; H = Hits; Avg. = Batting average; HR = Home runs; RBI = Runs batted In; SB = Stolen bases

Player	G	AB	R	H	Avg.	HR	RBI	SB
Cookie Rojas	109	340	58	99	.291	2	31	1
Rubén Amaro	129	299	31	79	.264	4	34	1
Gus Triandos	73	188	17	47	.250	8	33	0
Danny Cater	60	152	13	45	.294	7	26	0
Frank Thomas	39	143	20	42	.294	7	26	0
Roy Sievers	49	120	7	22	.183	4	16	0
Alex Johnson	43	109	18	33	.303	4	18	1
Johnny Briggs	61	66	16	17	.258	1	6	1
Vic Power	18	48	1	10	.208	0	3	0
Costen Shockley	11	35	4	8	.229	1	2	0
Adolfo Phillips	13	13	4	3	.231	0	0	0
Don Hoak	6	4	0	0	.000	0	0	0
Pat Corrales	2	1	1	0	.000	0	0	0

=== Pitching ===
==== Starting pitchers ====
Note: G = Games pitched; IP = Innings pitched; W = Wins; L = Losses; ERA = Earned run average; SO = Strikeouts

Player	G	IP	W	L	ERA	SO
Jim Bunning	41	284.0	19	8	2.63	219
Chris Short	42	221.0	17	9	2.20	181
Dennis Bennett	41	208.0	12	14	3.68	125
Art Mahaffey	34	157.0	12	9	4.53	80

==== Other pitchers ====
Note: G = Games pitched; IP = Innings pitched; W = Wins; L = Losses; ERA = Earned run average; SO = Strikeouts

Player	G	IP	W	L	ERA	SO
Ray Culp	30	135.0	8	7	4.13	96
Rick Wise	25	69.0	5	3	4.04	39
Cal McLish	2	5.1	0	1	3.38	6

==== Relief pitchers ====
Note: G = Games pitched; W = Wins; L = Losses; SV = Saves; ERA = Earned run average; SO = Strikeouts

Player	G	W	L	SV	ERA	SO
Jack Baldschun	71	6	9	21	3.12	96
Ed Roebuck	60	5	3	12	2.21	42
Dallas Green	25	2	1	0	5.79	21
John Boozer	22	3	4	2	5.07	51
Bobby Shantz	14	1	1	0	2.25	18
Johnny Klippstein	11	2	1	1	4.03	13
Bobby Locke	8	0	0	0	2.79	11
Morrie Steevens	4	0	0	0	3.38	3
Gary Kroll	2	0	0	0	3.00	2
Ryne Duren	2	0	0	0	6.00	5
Dave Bennett	1	0	0	0	9.00	1

== Farm system ==
Level	Team	League	Manager
AAA	Arkansas Travelers	Pacific Coast League	Frank Lucchesi
AA	Chattanooga Lookouts	Southern League	Andy Seminick
A	Bakersfield Bears	California League	Moose Johnson
A	Miami Marlins	Florida State League	Bobby Morgan
A	Eugene Emeralds	Northwest League	Bob Wellman
A	Spartanburg Phillies	Western Carolinas League	Dick Teed

== See also ==
- 2018 Philadelphia Phillies season
