= 1964 Pittsburgh Pirates season =

1964 Pittsburgh Pirates
- League: National League
- Ballpark: Forbes Field
- City: Pittsburgh, Pennsylvania
- Owners: John W. Galbreath (majority shareholder); Bing Crosby, Thomas P. Johnson (minority shareholders)
- General managers: Joe L. Brown
- Managers: Danny Murtaugh
- Television: KDKA-TV; Bob Prince, Jim Woods
- Radio: KDKA; Bob Prince, Jim Woods, Claude Haring

The 1964 Pittsburgh Pirates season was the 83rd in franchise history. The team finished tied for sixth in the National League with a record of 80–82, 13 games behind the St. Louis Cardinals.

== Offseason ==
- December 2, 1963: Byron Browne was drafted from the Pirates by the Chicago Cubs in the 1963 first-year draft.
- January 14, 1964: Dock Ellis was signed as an amateur free agent by the Pirates.
- Prior to 1964 season: John Lamb was signed as an amateur free agent by the Pirates.

== Regular season ==
=== Season standings ===
National League
Team	W	L	Pct.	GB	Home	Road
St. Louis Cardinals	93	69	.574	—	48‍–‍33	45‍–‍36
Philadelphia Phillies	92	70	.568	1	46‍–‍35	46‍–‍35
Cincinnati Reds	92	70	.568	1	47‍–‍34	45‍–‍36
San Francisco Giants	90	72	.556	3	44‍–‍37	46‍–‍35
Milwaukee Braves	88	74	.543	5	45‍–‍36	43‍–‍38
Pittsburgh Pirates	80	82	.494	13	42‍–‍39	38‍–‍43
Los Angeles Dodgers	80	82	.494	13	41‍–‍40	39‍–‍42
Chicago Cubs	76	86	.469	17	40‍–‍41	36‍–‍45
Houston Colt .45s	66	96	.407	27	41‍–‍40	25‍–‍56
New York Mets	53	109	.327	40	33‍–‍48	20‍–‍61

=== Record vs. opponents ===
1964 National League record Sources:
Team	CHC	CIN	HOU	LAD	MIL	NYM	PHI	PIT	SF	STL
Chicago	—	6–12	11–7	10–8	8–10	11–7	6–12	9–9	9–9	6–12
Cincinnati	12–6	—	12–6	14–4–1	9–9	11–7	9–9	8–10	7–11	10–8
Houston	7–11	6–12	—	7–11	12–6	9–9	5–13	5–13	7–11	8–10
Los Angeles	8–10	4–14–1	11–7	—	8–10	15–3–1	8–10	10–8	6–12	10–8
Milwaukee	10–8	9–9	6–12	10–8	—	14–4	10–8	12–6	9–9	8–10
New York	7–11	7–11	9–9	3–15–1	4–14	—	3–15	6–12	7–11	7–11
Philadelphia	12-6	9–9	13–5	10–8	8–10	15–3	—	10–8	10–8	5–13
Pittsburgh	9–9	10–8	13–5	8–10	6–12	12–6	8–10	—	8–10	6–12
San Francisco	9–9	11–7	11–7	12–6	9–9	11–7	8–10	10–8	—	9–9
St. Louis	12–6	8–10	10–8	8–10	10–8	11–7	13–5	12–6	9–9	—

=== Game log ===
1964 Game Log: 80–82 (Home: 42–39; Away: 38–43)
April: 7–6 (Home: 4–2; Away: 3–4)

#	Date	Opponent	Score	Win	Loss	Save	Attendance	Record
1	April 14	Cubs	4–8 (10)	Jackson	**Face** (0–1)	McDaniel	26,377	0–1
2	April 15	Cubs	5–4 (12)	**Face** (1–1)	Elston	—	7,009	1–1
3	April 17	@ Mets	4–3	**Friend** (1–0)	Bauta	—	50,312	2–1
4	April 18	@ Mets	9–5	**Schwall** (1–0)	Bearnarth	**Face** (1)	31,480	3–1
5	April 19	@ Mets	0–6	Jackson	**Veale** (0–1)	—	30,185	3–2
6	April 21	@ Cubs	8–5	**Face** (2–1)	Norman	—	3,222	4–2
7	April 23	@ Phillies	5–6	Baldschun	**Face** (2–2)	—	12,851	4–3
8	April 24	Mets	9–4	**Friend** (2–0)	Jackson	—	7,903	5–3
9	April 25	Mets	5–4	**Veale** (1–1)	Fisher	—	5,470	6–3
10	April 26	Mets	4–3	**Bork** (1–0)	Bearnarth	—		7–3
11	April 26	Mets	2–3	Stallard	**Schwall** (1–1)	Bauta	13,524	7–4
12	April 28	@ Braves	5–9	Smith	**Sisk** (0–1)	Tiefenauer	3,782	7–5
13	April 29	@ Braves	0–1	Cloninger	**Veale** (1–2)	—	4,337	7–6

May: 16–15 (Home: 6–8; Away: 10–7)

#	Date	Opponent	Score	Win	Loss	Save	Attendance	Record
14	May 1	@ Cardinals	2–6	Craig	**Law** (0–1)	—	14,701	7–7
15	May 2	@ Cardinals	5–4	**Sisk** (1–1)	Simmons	**Bork** (1)	12,534	8–7
16	May 3	@ Cardinals	12–8	**Schwall** (2–1)	Sadecki	**Face** (2)	11,051	9–7
17	May 4	@ Reds	4–2	**Gibbon** (1–0)	Jay	—	3,355	10–7
18	May 5	@ Reds	4–5	Dickson	**Law** (0–2)	—	4,096	10–8
19	May 6	Cardinals	1–0	**Friend** (3–0)	Sadecki	—	8,659	11–8
20	May 7	Cardinals	2–4	Simmons	**Veale** (1–3)	Craig	7,219	11–9
21	May 8	Braves	1–2	Cloninger	**Gibbon** (1–1)	—	11,508	11–10
22	May 9	Braves	10–0	**Law** (1–2)	Lemaster	—	6,536	12–10
23	May 10	Braves	5–11	Lemaster	**Friend** (3–1)	—		12–11
24	May 10	Braves	6–5	**McBean** (1–0)	Tiefenauer	—	16,430	13–11
25	May 11	Reds	6–7	Ellis	**Sisk** (1–2)	Henry	5,902	13–12
26	May 12	Reds	3–2	**Gibbon** (2–1)	Maloney	**McBean** (1)	5,811	14–12
27	May 15	@ Dodgers	0–6	Ortega	**Friend** (3–2)	—	33,507	14–13
28	May 16	@ Dodgers	7–4	**Veale** (2–3)	Willhite	**McBean** (2)	21,992	15–13
29	May 17	@ Dodgers	2–3	Koufax	**Law** (1–3)	Perranoski		15–14
30	May 17	@ Dodgers	8–3	**Gibbon** (3–1)	Podres	**Priddy** (1)	48,077	16–14
31	May 18	@ Dodgers	4–2	**Blass** (1–0)	Drysdale	—	23,621	17–14
32	May 19	@ Colt .45s	1–3	Bruce	**Friend** (3–3)	Woodeshick	6,199	17–15
33	May 20	@ Colt .45s	4–3	**Veale** (3–3)	Nottebart	**McBean** (3)	5,715	18–15
34	May 21	@ Colt .45s	1–3	Farrell	**Law** (1–4)	Woodeshick	5,880	18–16
35	May 22	@ Giants	3–8	Herbel	**Blass** (1–1)	MacKenzie	18,873	18–17
36	May 23	@ Giants	9–2	**Friend** (4–3)	Perry	—	20,113	19–17
37	May 24	@ Giants	3–0	**Veale** (4–3)	Sanford	—		20–17
38	May 24	@ Giants	5–3	**Butters** (1–0)	Shaw	**McBean** (4)	40,441	21–17
39	May 26	Phillies	13–4	**Law** (2–4)	Short	—	12,183	22–17
40	May 27	Phillies	0–2	Mahaffey	**Friend** (4–4)	—	10,914	22–18
41	May 28	Phillies	6–5	**McBean** (2–0)	Baldschun	—	8,649	23–18
42	May 29	Dodgers	1–4	Moeller	**Blass** (1–2)	—	16,114	23–19
43	May 30	Dodgers	3–10	Drysdale	**Law** (2–5)	—	14,359	23–20
44	May 31	Dodgers	4–6	Koufax	**Friend** (4–5)	Perranoski	9,354	23–21

June: 15–11 (Home: 10–6; Away: 5–5)

#	Date	Opponent	Score	Win	Loss	Save	Attendance	Record
45	June 2	Giants	3–1	**Veale** (5–3)	Hendley	—	9,357	24–21
46	June 3	Giants	0–3	Herbel	**Priddy** (0–1)	—	10,184	24–22
47	June 4	Giants	4–2	**Blass** (2–2)	Bolin	—	10,574	25–22
48	June 5	Colt .45s	4–3	**Priddy** (1–1)	Woodeshick	—	8,693	26–22
49	June 7	Colt .45s	3–6	Raymond	**Priddy** (1–2)	—		26–23
50	June 7	Colt .45s	6–1	**Law** (3–5)	Bruce	—	13,149	27–23
51	June 9	@ Phillies	3–4	Mahaffey	**Gibbon** (3–2)	Roebuck		27–24
52	June 9	@ Phillies	4–0	**Blass** (3–2)	Culp	—	32,155	28–24
53	June 10	@ Phillies	1–4	Short	**Friend** (4–6)	—	15,352	28–25
54	June 12	@ Cubs	1–7	Buhl	**Veale** (5–4)	—	7,575	28–26
55	June 13	@ Cubs	10–7	**Law** (4–5)	Burdette	**McBean** (5)	14,960	29–26
56	June 14	@ Cubs	2–5	Ellsworth	**Blass** (3–3)	—	27,901	29–27
57	June 16	Mets	2–1	**Veale** (6–4)	Fisher	—	7,187	30–27
58	June 17	Mets	3–2	**Friend** (5–6)	Stallard	—	9,931	31–27
59	June 18	Mets	10–0	**Law** (5–5)	Jackson	—	7,110	32–27
60	June 20	Cubs	2–0	**Gibbon** (4–2)	Broglio	**McBean** (6)	7,455	33–27
61	June 21	Cubs	1–2	Jackson	**Veale** (6–5)	—		33–28
62	June 21	Cubs	2–7	Burdette	**Blass** (3–4)	McDaniel	16,250	33–29
63	June 23	@ Mets	5–1	**Law** (6–5)	Willey	**McBean** (7)	25,764	34–29
64	June 24	@ Mets	3–1	**Friend** (6–6)	Cisco	**McBean** (8)	10,652	35–29
65	June 25	@ Mets	8–1	**Gibbon** (5–2)	Fisher	—	12,834	36–29
66	June 26	Reds	8–3	**Veale** (7–5)	Jay	—	19,197	37–29
67	June 27	Reds	4–2	**McBean** (3–0)	Purkey	—	8,460	38–29
68	June 28	Reds	2–6	Tsitouris	**Law** (6–6)	—		38–30
69	June 28	Reds	5–6	Maloney	**Friend** (6–7)	McCool	21,788	38–31
70	June 29	@ Dodgers	6–7	Perranoski	**Face** (2–3)	—	29,946	38–32

July: 15–13 (Home: 7–6; Away: 8–7)

#	Date	Opponent	Score	Win	Loss	Save	Attendance	Record
71	July 1	@ Giants	1–2	Marichal	**Veale** (7–6)	—	10,221	38–33
72	July 2	@ Giants	5–6	Hendley	**Blass** (3–5)	Shaw	11,166	38–34
73	July 3	@ Colt .45s	2–1	**Law** (7–6)	Owens	**McBean** (9)	8,740	39–34
74	July 4	@ Colt .45s	1–3	Bruce	**Friend** (6–8)	—	13,692	39–35
75	July 5	@ Colt .45s	7–1	**Gibbon** (6–2)	Farrell	**McBean** (10)	11,042	40–35
76	July 8	Reds	9–1	**Veale** (8–6)	Maloney	**McBean** (11)	7,031	41–35
77	July 9	Braves	6–11	Spahn	**Law** (7–7)	Sadowski	9,295	41–36
78	July 10	Braves	5–1	**Friend** (7–8)	Cloninger	—	13,148	42–36
79	July 11	Braves	8–9 (11)	Cloninger	**Sisk** (1–3)	Olivo	7,874	42–37
80	July 13	Cardinals	4–5 (12)	Taylor	**Sisk** (1–4)	—		42–38
81	July 13	Cardinals	5–12	Cuellar	**Law** (7–8)	Washburn	14,773	42–39
82	July 14	Phillies	4–3	**Veale** (9–6)	McLish	**McBean** (12)	9,664	43–39
83	July 15	Phillies	3–0	**Friend** (8–8)	Bunning	—	11,633	44–39
84	July 16	Phillies	5–7	Mahaffey	**Gibbon** (6–3)	Baldschun	12,163	44–40
85	July 18	@ Braves	8–2	**Veale** (10–6)	Spahn	—	17,192	45–40
86	July 19	@ Braves	2–6	Cloninger	**Friend** (8–9)	—		45–41
87	July 19	@ Braves	4–5	Lemaster	**Blass** (3–6)	Fischer	23,989	45–42
88	July 21	@ Cardinals	8–4	**Gibbon** (7–3)	Sadecki	**Bork** (2)	11,805	46–42
89	July 22	@ Cardinals	13–2	**Veale** (11–6)	Craig	—	11,089	47–42
90	July 23	@ Cardinals	8–5	**Blass** (4–6)	Cuellar	**Face** (3)	7,893	48–42
91	July 24	@ Reds	0–2	O'Toole	**Friend** (8–10)	—	14,317	48–43
92	July 25	@ Reds	6–3	**Law** (8–8)	Nuxhall	**McBean** (13)	6,534	49–43
93	July 26	@ Reds	2–7	Jay	**Gibbon** (7–4)	Ellis		49–44
94	July 26	@ Reds	5–1	**Veale** (12–6)	Tsitouris	—	14,814	50–44
95	July 29	Colt .45s	5–2	**Friend** (9–10)	Farrell	—	8,572	51–44
96	July 30	Colt .45s	1–0	**Law** (9–8)	Bruce	—		52–44
97	July 30	Colt .45s	8–3	**Schwall** (3–1)	Owens	**McBean** (14)	11,314	53–44
98	July 31	Giants	6–8	Shaw	**Veale** (12–7)	O'Dell	28,076	53–45

August: 13–19 (Home: 9–7; Away: 4–12)

#	Date	Opponent	Score	Win	Loss	Save	Attendance	Record
99	August 1	Giants	6–1	**Gibbon** (8–4)	Herbel	—	15,882	54–45
100	August 2	Giants	1–2	Pregenzer	**Friend** (9–11)	O'Dell	22,402	54–46
101	August 3	Giants	3–2	**McBean** (4–0)	O'Dell	—	12,465	55–46
102	August 4	Dodgers	1–5	Koufax	**Veale** (12–8)	Miller		55–47
103	August 4	Dodgers	7–10	Moeller	**Schwall** (3–2)	Perranoski	25,807	55–48
104	August 5	Dodgers	4–3	**McBean** (5–0)	Perranoski	—	11,071	56–48
105	August 6	Dodgers	4–1	**Friend** (10–11)	Miller	—	10,599	57–48
106	August 7	Cubs	3–7	Jackson	**Law** (9–9)	—		57–49
107	August 7	Cubs	3–4	Broglio	**Blass** (4–7)	Shantz	13,862	57–50
108	August 8	Cubs	5–2	**Veale** (13–8)	Burdette	—	6,845	58–50
109	August 9	Cubs	2–0	**Schwall** (4–2)	Buhl	**McBean** (15)	11,305	59–50
110	August 11	Mets	2–3 (8)	Fisher	**Friend** (10–12)	—	8,542	59–51
111	August 12	Mets	5–4	**Gibbon** (9–4)	Ribant	**McBean** (16)	6,677	60–51
112	August 14	@ Cubs	3–2	**McBean** (6–0)	Shantz	—		61–51
113	August 14	@ Cubs	2–4	Burdette	**Law** (9–10)	—	12,634	61–52
114	August 15	@ Cubs	5–4	**McBean** (7–0)	McDaniel	—	23,003	62–52
115	August 16	@ Cubs	4–5	Elston	**McBean** (7–1)	—		62–53
116	August 16	@ Cubs	7–4	**Blass** (5–7)	Slaughter	**Face** (4)	22,376	63–53
117	August 17	@ Mets	0–5	Ribant	**Veale** (13–9)	—	12,350	63–54
118	August 18	@ Mets	3–7	Jackson	**Gibbon** (9–5)	—	18,905	63–55
119	August 19	@ Mets	2–4	Stallard	**Law** (9–11)	—	19,192	63–56
120	August 20	@ Phillies	0–2	Mahaffey	**Friend** (10–13)	—		63–57
121	August 20	@ Phillies	2–3	Wise	**Schwall** (4–3)	Roebuck	35,814	63–58
122	August 21	@ Phillies	0–2	Short	**Veale** (13–10)	—	30,170	63–59
123	August 22	@ Phillies	9–4	**Bork** (2–0)	Bennett	**McBean** (17)	14,955	64–59
124	August 23	@ Phillies	3–9	Bunning	**Gibbon** (9–6)	Boozer	19,213	64–60
125	August 24	@ Cardinals	1–5	Gibson	**Friend** (10–14)	—	10,881	64–61
126	August 25	@ Cardinals	6–7 (13)	Taylor	**McBean** (7–2)	—	8,664	64–62
127	August 26	@ Cardinals	2–4	Cuellar	**Bork** (2–1)	—	9,662	64–63
128	August 28	Phillies	4–2	**Face** (3–3)	Roebuck	—	20,374	65–63
129	August 29	Phillies	8–10	Mahaffey	**Friend** (10–15)	Baldschun	12,186	65–64
130	August 30	Phillies	10–2	**Veale** (14–10)	Short	—	14,080	66–64

September: 13–14 (Home: 6–10; Away: 7–4)

#	Date	Opponent	Score	Win	Loss	Save	Attendance	Record
131	September 1	Dodgers	5–2	**Friend** (11–15)	Ortega	—	6,648	67–64
132	September 2	Dodgers	5–8 (12)	Miller	**Law** (9–12)	—	7,109	67–65
133	September 4	Colt .45s	10–2	**Veale** (15–10)	Bruce	—	6,133	68–65
134	September 5	Colt .45s	4–1	**Friend** (12–15)	Johnson	—	4,272	69–65
135	September 6	Colt .45s	1–0	**Law** (10–12)	Nottebart	—	4,886	70–65
136	September 7	Giants	4–6	Perry	**Gibbon** (9–7)	Duffalo		70–66
137	September 7	Giants	6–9	Pregenzer	**Bork** (2–2)	Shaw	14,948	70–67
138	September 9	Reds	4–1	**Veale** (16–10)	Jay	**McBean** (18)	5,245	71–67
139	September 10	Reds	0–3	Purkey	**Friend** (12–16)	—	4,993	71–68
140	September 11	@ Colt .45s	3–0	**Law** (11–12)	Nottebart	—	4,042	72–68
141	September 12	@ Colt .45s	1–2	Larsen	**Butters** (1–1)	Woodeshick	7,308	72–69
142	September 13	@ Colt .45s	3–0	**Cardwell** (1–0)	Farrell	—	3,370	73–69
143	September 14	@ Dodgers	7–2	**Veale** (17–10)	Reed	—	16,625	74–69
144	September 15	@ Dodgers	3–5	Miller	**Friend** (12–17)	Miller	14,920	74–70
145	September 16	@ Dodgers	7–5	**Law** (12–12)	Ortega	**McBean** (19)	15,049	75–70
146	September 18	@ Giants	4–3	**Veale** (18–10)	Shaw	**McBean** (20)	9,741	76–70
147	September 19	@ Giants	4–13	Marichal	**Friend** (12–18)	—	11,012	76–71
148	September 20	@ Giants	3–4 (11)	Duffalo	**McBean** (7–3)	—	15,548	76–72
149	September 22	Braves	0–2	Lemaster	**Veale** (18–11)	—	3,680	76–73
150	September 23	Braves	7–4	**Gibbon** (10–7)	Cloninger	—	2,776	77–73
151	September 24	Cardinals	2–4	Gibson	**Wood** (0–1)	—		77–74
152	September 24	Cardinals	0–4	Sadecki	**Butters** (1–2)	—	2,846	77–75
153	September 25	Cardinals	3–5	Richardson	**Cardwell** (1–1)	Schultz	3,694	77–76
154	September 26	Cardinals	3–6	Simmons	**Veale** (18–12)	Schultz	4,085	77–77
155	September 27	Cardinals	0–5	Craig	**Law** (12–13)	Schultz	19,287	77–78
156	September 29	@ Reds	2–0	**Friend** (13–18)	McCool	—	10,858	78–78
157	September 30	@ Reds	1–0 (16)	**McBean** (8–3)	Tsitouris	—	8,188	79–78

October: 1–4 (Home: 0–0; Away: 1–4)

#	Date	Opponent	Score	Win	Loss	Save	Attendance	Record
158	October 1	@ Reds	4–5	Nuxhall	**Blass** (5–8)	Ellis	7,081	79–79
159	October 2	@ Braves	2–3 (10)	Cloninger	**Wood** (0–2)	—		79–80
160	October 2	@ Braves	5–4	**Butters** (2–2)	Schneider	**McBean** (21)	7,800	80–80
161	October 3	@ Braves	5–11	Umbach	**Cardwell** (1–2)	Spahn	5,636	80–81
162	October 4	@ Braves	0–6	Sadowski	**Francis** (0–1)	Spahn	10,079	80–82

Legend: = Win = Loss
Bold = Pirates team member

=== Notable transactions ===
- June 13, 1964: Al Oliver was signed as an amateur free agent by the Pirates.
- September 6, 1964: Wilbur Wood was purchased by the Pirates from the Boston Red Sox.
- September 12, 1964: Smoky Burgess was selected off waivers from the Pirates by the Chicago White Sox.

=== Roster ===
1964 Pittsburgh Pirates
**Roster**
**Pitchers**: 28 Steve Blass; 36 Frank Bork; 38 Tom Butters; 30 Don Cardwell; 26 Roy Face; 27 Earl Francis; 19 Bob Friend; 20 John Gelnar; 22 Joe Gibbon; 29 Fred Green; 32 Vern Law; 34 Al McBean; 31 Bob Priddy; 29 Don Schwall; 25 Tommie Sisk; 39 Bob Veale; 16 Wilbur Wood	**Catchers**: 6 Smoky Burgess; 4 Jerry May; 5 Orlando McFarlane; 3 Jim Pagliaroni; **Infielders**: 14 Gene Alley; 7 Bob Bailey; 17 Donn Clendenon; 12 Gene Freese; 9 Bill Mazeroski; 11 Dick Schofield	**Outfielders**: 21 Roberto Clemente; 4 Rex Johnston; 24 Jerry Lynch; 15 Manny Mota; 8 Willie Stargell; 18 Bill Virdon; 2 Dave Wissman; **Other batters**: 23 Julio Gotay	**Manager**: 40 Danny Murtaugh; **Coaches**: 45 Lenny Levy; 43 Sam Narron; 44 Frank Oceak; 41 Don Osborn; 42 Mickey Vernon

== Statistics ==
Batting

Note: G = Games played; AB = At bats; H = Hits; Avg. = Batting average; HR = Home runs; RBI = Runs batted in

Regular Season
Player	G	AB	H	Avg.	HR	RBI
Julio Gotay	3	2	1	0.500	0	0
Roberto Clemente	155	622	211	0.339	12	87
Vern Law	36	61	19	0.311	1	3
Jim Pagliaroni	97	302	89	0.295	10	36
Donn Clendenon	133	457	129	0.282	12	64
Bob Bailey	143	530	149	0.281	11	51
Manny Mota	115	271	75	0.277	5	32
Willie Stargell	117	421	115	0.273	21	78
Jerry Lynch	114	297	81	0.273	16	66
Bill Mazeroski	162	601	161	0.268	10	64
Don Schwall	16	19	5	0.263	0	1
Jerry May	11	31	8	0.258	0	3
Joe Gibbon	29	47	12	0.255	0	1
Dick Schofield	121	398	98	0.246	3	36
Smoky Burgess	68	171	42	0.246	2	17
Orlando McFarlane	37	78	19	0.244	0	1
Bill Virdon	145	473	115	0.243	3	27
Gene Freese	99	289	65	0.225	9	40
Gene Alley	81	209	44	0.211	6	13
Frank Bork	33	5	1	0.200	0	2
Tom Butters	28	11	2	0.182	0	3
Bob Veale	41	96	15	0.156	0	2
Dave Wissman	16	27	4	0.148	0	0
Don Cardwell	4	7	1	0.143	0	0
Al McBean	58	12	1	0.083	0	0
Bob Friend	35	71	5	0.070	0	2
Steve Blass	24	30	2	0.067	0	1
Roy Face	55	4	0	0.000	0	0
Earl Francis	2	1	0	0.000	0	0
Rex Johnston	14	7	0	0.000	0	0
Bob Priddy	19	3	0	0.000	0	0
Tommie Sisk	42	8	0	0.000	0	0
Wilbur Wood	3	5	0	0.000	0	0
John Gelnar	7	0	0	—	0	0
Fred Green	8	0	0	—	0	0
Team totals	162	5,566	1,469	0.264	121	630

Pitching

Note: G = Games pitched; IP = Innings pitched; W = Wins; L = Losses; ERA = Earned run average; SO = Strikeouts

Regular Season
Player	G	IP	W	L	ERA	SO
Fred Green	8	7 1/3	0	0	1.23	2
Al McBean	58	89 2/3	8	3	1.91	41
Tom Butters	28	64 1/3	2	2	2.38	58
Bob Veale	40	279 2/3	18	12	2.74	250
Don Cardwell	4	19 1/3	1	2	2.79	10
Bob Friend	35	240 1/3	13	18	3.33	128
Vern Law	35	192	12	13	3.61	93
Wilbur Wood	3	17 1/3	0	2	3.63	7
Joe Gibbon	28	146 2/3	10	7	3.68	97
Bob Priddy	19	34 1/3	1	2	3.93	23
Steve Blass	24	104 2/3	5	8	4.04	67
Frank Bork	33	42	2	2	4.07	31
Don Schwall	15	49 2/3	4	3	4.35	36
John Gelnar	7	9	0	0	5.00	4
Roy Face	55	79 2/3	3	3	5.20	63
Tommie Sisk	42	61 1/3	1	4	6.16	35
Earl Francis	2	6 1/3	0	1	8.53	6
Team totals	162	1,443 2/3	80	82	3.52	951

== Farm system ==
Level	Team	League	Manager
AAA	Columbus Jets	International League	Larry Shepard
AA	Asheville Tourists	Southern League	Ray Hathaway and Bob Clear
A	Reno Silver Sox	California League	Tom Saffell and Harvey Koepf
A	Kinston Eagles	Carolina League	Harding "Pete" Peterson
A	Batavia Pirates	New York–Penn League	Gene Baker
A	Gastonia Pirates	Western Carolinas League	Bob Clear and Ray Hathaway
Rookie	Salem Pirates	Appalachian League	George Detore
