= 1964 San Francisco Giants season =

1964 San Francisco Giants
- League: National League
- Ballpark: Candlestick Park
- City: San Francisco, California
- Record: 90–72 (.556)
- League place: 4th
- Owners: Horace Stoneham
- General managers: Chub Feeney
- Managers: Alvin Dark
- Television: KTVU (Russ Hodges, Lon Simmons)
- Radio: KSFO (Russ Hodges, Lon Simmons)

The 1964 San Francisco Giants season was the Giants' 82nd year in Major League Baseball, their seventh year in San Francisco since their move from New York following the 1957 season, and their fifth at Candlestick Park. The team finished in fourth place, as a result of their 90–72 record, placing them three games behind the National League and World Series Champion St. Louis Cardinals.

== Offseason ==
- October 1, 1963: Jimmie Coker was traded by the Giants to the St. Louis Cardinals for Ken MacKenzie.
- October 10, 1963: Jack Fisher was drafted from the Giants by the New York Mets in a 1963 special draft.
- March 29, 1964: Joey Amalfitano was purchased from the Giants by the Chicago Cubs.
- April 14, 1964: Duke Snider was purchased by the Giants from the New York Mets

=== Spring training ===
The Giants held spring training games at Phoenix Municipal Stadium, which opened in 1964. In the first game at Phoenix Muni on March 8, 1964, the Giants beat Cleveland, 6 to 2. Willie Mays hit the first home run at the park, in front of a crowd of 8,582. In attendance for the dedication ceremonies were Commissioner Ford Frick, National League President Warren Giles, and Giants owner Horace Stoneham.

== Regular season ==
=== Season standings ===
National League
Team	W	L	Pct.	GB	Home	Road
St. Louis Cardinals	93	69	.574	—	48‍–‍33	45‍–‍36
Philadelphia Phillies	92	70	.568	1	46‍–‍35	46‍–‍35
Cincinnati Reds	92	70	.568	1	47‍–‍34	45‍–‍36
San Francisco Giants	90	72	.556	3	44‍–‍37	46‍–‍35
Milwaukee Braves	88	74	.543	5	45‍–‍36	43‍–‍38
Pittsburgh Pirates	80	82	.494	13	42‍–‍39	38‍–‍43
Los Angeles Dodgers	80	82	.494	13	41‍–‍40	39‍–‍42
Chicago Cubs	76	86	.469	17	40‍–‍41	36‍–‍45
Houston Colt .45s	66	96	.407	27	41‍–‍40	25‍–‍56
New York Mets	53	109	.327	40	33‍–‍48	20‍–‍61

=== Record vs. opponents ===
1964 National League record Sources:
Team	CHC	CIN	HOU	LAD	MIL	NYM	PHI	PIT	SF	STL
Chicago	—	6–12	11–7	10–8	8–10	11–7	6–12	9–9	9–9	6–12
Cincinnati	12–6	—	12–6	14–4–1	9–9	11–7	9–9	8–10	7–11	10–8
Houston	7–11	6–12	—	7–11	12–6	9–9	5–13	5–13	7–11	8–10
Los Angeles	8–10	4–14–1	11–7	—	8–10	15–3–1	8–10	10–8	6–12	10–8
Milwaukee	10–8	9–9	6–12	10–8	—	14–4	10–8	12–6	9–9	8–10
New York	7–11	7–11	9–9	3–15–1	4–14	—	3–15	6–12	7–11	7–11
Philadelphia	12-6	9–9	13–5	10–8	8–10	15–3	—	10–8	10–8	5–13
Pittsburgh	9–9	10–8	13–5	8–10	6–12	12–6	8–10	—	8–10	6–12
San Francisco	9–9	11–7	11–7	12–6	9–9	11–7	8–10	10–8	—	9–9
St. Louis	12–6	8–10	10–8	8–10	10–8	11–7	13–5	12–6	9–9	—

=== Opening Day starters ===
- Orlando Cepeda
- Jim Davenport
- Tom Haller
- Jim Ray Hart
- Harvey Kuenn
- Juan Marichal
- Willie Mays
- Willie McCovey
- José Pagán

=== Roster ===
1964 San Francisco Giants
Roster
Pitchers: 42 Bobby Bolin; 45 Jim Duffalo; 25 Dick Estelle; 38 Bob Hendley; 34 Ron Herbel; 18 Don Larsen; 27 Juan Marichal; 37 Ken MacKenzie; 10 Masanori Murakami; 31 Billy O'Dell; 36 Gaylord Perry; 19 Billy Pierce; 18 John Pregenzer; 33 Jack Sanford; 29 Bob Shaw	Catchers: 9 Del Crandall; 5 Tom Haller; 39 Randy Hundley; Infielders: 30 Orlando Cepeda; 12 Jim Davenport; 21 Gil Garrido; 16 Jim Ray Hart; 26 Chuck Hiller; 22 Hal Lanier; 15 José Pagán	Outfielders: 14 Jesús Alou; 41 Matty Alou; 10,21 José Cardenal; 7 Harvey Kuenn; 24 Willie Mays; 44 Willie McCovey; 17 Cap Peterson; 28 Duke Snider	Manager: 1 Alvin Dark; Coaches: 6 Herman Franks; 46 Larry Jansen; 8 Cookie Lavagetto; 3 Whitey Lockman

== Player stats ==
=== Batting ===
==== Starters by position ====
Note: Pos = Position; G = Games played; AB = At bats; H = Hits; Avg. = Batting average; HR = Home runs; RBI = Runs batted in

Pos	Player	G	AB	H	Avg.	HR	RBI
C	Tom Haller	117	388	98	.253	16	48
1B	Orlando Cepeda	142	529	161	.304	31	97
2B	Hal Lanier	98	383	105	.274	2	28
3B	Jim Ray Hart	153	566	162	.286	31	81
SS	José Pagán	134	367	82	.223	1	28
LF	Willie McCovey	130	364	80	.220	18	54
CF	Willie Mays	157	578	171	.296	47	111
RF	Jesús Alou	115	376	103	.274	3	28

==== Other batters ====
Note: G = Games played; AB = At bats; H = Hits; Avg. = Batting average; HR = Home runs; RBI = Runs batted in

Player	G	AB	H	Avg.	HR	RBI
Harvey Kuenn	111	351	92	.262	4	22
Jim Davenport	116	297	70	.236	2	26
Matty Alou	110	250	66	.264	1	14
Chuck Hiller	80	205	37	.180	1	17
Del Crandall	69	195	45	.231	3	11
Duke Snider	91	167	35	.210	4	17
Cap Peterson	66	74	15	.203	1	8
Gil Garrido	14	25	2	.080	0	1
José Cardenal	20	15	0	.000	0	0
Randy Hundley	2	1	0	.000	0	0

=== Pitching ===
==== Starting pitchers ====
Note: G = Games pitched; IP = Innings pitched; W = Wins; L = Losses; ERA = Earned run average; SO = Strikeouts

Player	G	IP	W	L	ERA	SO
Juan Marichal	33	269.0	21	8	2.48	206
Bob Hendley	30	163.1	10	11	3.64	104
Jack Sanford	18	106.1	5	7	3.30	64
Dick Estelle	6	41.2	1	2	3.02	23

==== Other pitchers ====
Note: G = Games pitched; IP = Innings pitched; W = Wins; L = Losses; ERA = Earned run average; SO = Strikeouts

Player	G	IP	W	L	ERA	SO
Gaylord Perry	44	206.1	12	11	2.75	155
Bobby Bolin	38	174.2	6	9	3.25	146
Ron Herbel	40	161.0	9	9	3.07	98
Billy O'Dell	36	85.0	8	7	5.40	54

==== Relief pitchers ====
Note: G = Games pitched; W = Wins; L = Losses; SV = Saves; ERA = Earned run average; SO = Strikeouts

Player	G	W	L	SV	ERA	SO
Bob Shaw	61	7	6	11	3.76	57
Jim Duffalo	35	5	1	3	2.92	55
Billy Pierce	34	3	0	4	2.20	29
John Pregenzer	13	2	0	0	4.91	8
Ken MacKenzie	10	0	0	1	5.00	3
Masanori Murakami	9	1	0	1	1.80	15
Don Larsen	6	0	1	0	4.35	6

== Awards and honors ==
All-Star Game

- Orlando Cepeda, first base, starter
- Juan Marichal, reserve
- Willie Mays, outfield, starter

== Farm system ==
Level	Team	League	Manager
AAA	Tacoma Giants	Pacific Coast League	Charlie Fox
AA	Springfield Giants	Eastern League	Andy Gilbert
AA	El Paso Sun Kings	Texas League	Dave Garcia
A	Fresno Giants	California League	Bill Werle
A	Decatur Commodores	Midwest League	Richie Klaus
A	Lexington Giants	Western Carolinas League	Max Lanier
Rookie	Magic Valley Cowboys	Pioneer League	Rex Carr

LEAGUE CHAMPIONS: Fresno
