= Jack Baldschun =

American baseball player (1936–2023)

- Pitcher
- Born: October 16, 1936; Greenville, Ohio, U.S.
- Died: June 6, 2023 (aged 86); Green Bay, Wisconsin, U.S.
- Batted: Right Threw: Right

MLB debut
- April 28, 1961, for the Philadelphia Phillies

Last MLB appearance
- August 21, 1970, for the San Diego Padres

MLB statistics
- Win–loss record: 48–41
- Earned run average: 3.69
- Strikeouts: 555
- Saves: 60
- Stats at Baseball Reference

Teams
- Philadelphia Phillies (1961–1965); Cincinnati Reds (1966–1967); San Diego Padres (1969–1970)

Jack Edward Baldschun (October 16, 1936 – June 6, 2023) was an American professional baseball pitcher. He was a relief pitcher in Major League Baseball (MLB) for all or part of nine seasons (1961–67; 1969–70), for the Philadelphia Phillies, Cincinnati Reds, and San Diego Padres. Baldschun threw and batted right-handed, and was listed as 6 feet 1 inch (1.85 m) tall, weighing 175 pounds (79 kg).

== Personal life ==
Baldschun was a graduate of Greenville High School in his native Greenville, Ohio. He was originally signed by the Washington Senators out of Miami University in Oxford, Ohio, in 1956. Baldschun spent only one year in the Washington organization before he was acquired by Cincinnati and assigned to their Class C affiliate in Wausau, Wisconsin. In 1957, while playing minor league baseball for the Lumberjacks, he met his future wife, Charlotte Kolbe. They were married on April 10, 1958, and had two children, Kim and Brad.

== Baseball career ==
Baldschun was selected by the Phillies in the Rule 5 draft on November 28, 1960. After learning how to throw the screwball, Baldschun made it to the majors as a 24-year-old rookie in 1961.

Baldschun made his major league debut on April 28, 1961, in relief of Chris Short in a 10-9 Phillies road loss to the St. Louis Cardinals. Baldschun pitched one inning, allowing no runs, one hit and one walk. That season. the Phillies endured their fourth straight last-place finish with a major league-worst 47–107 mark and a 23-game losing streak in August that still stands as a record. Baldschun led all National League pitchers with 65 appearances and was the only Phillies pitcher with a winning record (5–3).

Baldschun established himself as the closer by leading the team in saves in each of the next three years (13 in 1962, 16 in 1963, 21 in 1964). During the Phillies' "September swoon" of 1964, Baldschun was used in relief but not as a closer because manager Gene Mauch believed he was not going after hitters aggressively enough and was going too deep in the counts. Baldschun continued to fall out of favor with Mauch in 1965, registering only six saves due to a failure to hold leads. His five-season record in Philadelphia was 39–34 with 59 saves.

Baldschun was among the National League leaders in several categories during his career, including leading the league in games pitched with 65 in 1961. He was also in the league's top 10 in games pitched in 1962, 1963, 1964, 1965 and 1969 and in saves in 1961, 1962 and 1964.

Baldschun was traded to the Baltimore Orioles for Jackie Brandt and Darold Knowles on December 6, 1965. Baldschun was originally expected to strengthen a bullpen that featured aging veterans Dick Hall and Stu Miller and lost Harvey Haddix to retirement. Instead he drew the interest of the Reds which acquired him, Milt Pappas and Dick Simpson from the Orioles for Frank Robinson three days later on December 9. Baldschun went 9–7 with one save for the remainder of his major league career.

Over nine major league seasons, Baldschun had a 48–41 record with 60 saves, 555 strikeouts and a 3.69 earned run average in 457 games. He had 704 innings pitched, allowing 687 hits, 45 home runs, 298 walks (including 67 intentional), 23 hit batsmen and 49 wild pitches.

== After baseball ==
Immediately after his playing career ended, Baldschun and his wife Charlotte moved to Green Bay, Wisconsin, and Jack joined his brother-in-law in a carpentry business. Three years later, he became a salesman for a lumber company.

In retirement, Baldschun became a grandfather and lived in Green Bay. He died of leukemia on June 6, 2023, at the age of 86.
