= Costen Shockley =

American baseball player (1942–2022)

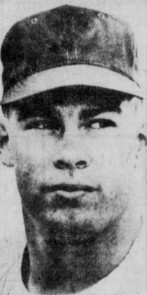
- First baseman
- Born: February 8, 1942; Georgetown, Delaware, U.S.
- Died: May 30, 2022 (aged 80); Georgetown, Delaware, U.S.
- Batted: Left Threw: Left

MLB debut
- July 17, 1964, for the Philadelphia Phillies

Last MLB appearance
- June 7, 1965, for the Los Angeles Angels

MLB statistics
- Batting average: .197
- Hits: 28
- Home runs: 3
- Stats at Baseball Reference

Teams
- Philadelphia Phillies (1964); Los Angeles Angels (1965)

John Costen Shockley (February 8, 1942 – May 30, 2022) was an American professional baseball player who appeared in 51 Major League games for the Philadelphia Phillies (1964) and Los Angeles Angels (1965). A first baseman who batted and threw left-handed, Shockley was listed as 6 feet 2 inches (1.88 m) tall and 200 pounds (91 kg).

== Early life ==
Shockley was born on February 8, 1942, in Georgetown, Delaware. He was the eldest of seven children, and was named after two of his great-grandfathers. As a youth, he was a star player in the PONY Leagues. Beginning in seventh grade, Shockley attended Georgetown High School in Delaware, where he competed in football, baseball, and basketball. In football, which he stated was his favorite sport, Shockley played on offense at running back, at linebacker on defense, and also was the team's kicking specialist.

In basketball, Shockley led the team in scoring as a junior and as a senior, averaging 27.5 points-per-game with his "nifty one-handed jump shot" in 1958–59 and placing fourth in conference scoring in 1959–60.

Shockley was best in baseball, having a 31–3 record as a pitcher by the beginning of his senior year. His batting average neared .600 at Georgetown. Shockley later stated that he "had already been contacted by every major-league team" by the time his senior year started.

To begin his senior year of baseball, Shockley pitched a no-hitter against Lewes High School in front of "a large assemblage of major league scouts." The News Journal reported in May 1960 that fifteen Major League Baseball (MLB) teams had made personal appearances to Shockley stating they were interesting in him. However, shortly afterwards he contracted hepatitis and was hospitalized for several weeks, causing most MLB scouts to lose interest in him.

While at Georgetown, Shockley also played baseball for a local American Legion team as well as the semi-professional Hebron team of the Central Shore League.

== Professional career ==
According to Shockley, only about five teams kept interest in him while he was ill. The Philadelphia Phillies, his favorite team, was one of them, and a contract they offered him he signed on July 4, 1960. He was assigned to the Class A Williamsport Grays, but did not play in his first year as a result of his illness.

Reporting to the Philadelphia Phillies camp in 1961, Shockley did not know which position the team would have him play; they had not told him which they would have him at. Consequently, he came to his first practice with both a pitching shoe and a first baseman's glove. When Phillies manager Gene Mauch met Shockley for the first time, he said "Get rid of that shoe; you’re going to be a first baseman."

That year, Shockley played for the Class C Magic Valley Cowboys of the Pioneer League. He finished the first half of the season with 10 home runs and a .359 batting average, and ended with 23 home runs and an average of .360. In the year, he appeared at-bat 470 times, and made 169 hits, 31 doubles, and six triples. He scored 108 runs-batted-in and appeared in a total of 126 games. After the season ended, Shockley was voted league Rookie of the Year.

In 1962, Shockley was a member of the Class A Williamsport Grays. He appeared in 133 games and fielded .983 while making 144 hits, 29 doubles, five triples and 10 home runs for a batting average of .282. He was promoted to Double-A in 1963 and played for the Chattanooga Lookouts of the Sally League. With the Lookouts, Shockley batted .335 and made 160 hits, 27 doubles, 12 triples and eight home runs in 127 games. He scored 74 runs-batted-in and was second in the Sally League in batting.

On April 9, 1964, Shockley was sent to the Triple-A Arkansas Travelers of the Pacific Coast League (PCL). From April 27 through May 15, he hit safely in 19 consecutive matches. From May 30 to June 9, he made four home runs in eight games. Through July 15, Shockley had posted a batting average of .300 and scored 24 home runs.

On July 16, Shockley was called up to the major leagues. He made his MLB debut one day later against the Cincinnati Reds. In his debut, he batted sixth and walked at the top of the second against the Reds' pitcher Joey Jay. He grounded out in his second appearance, and made his first major league hit in the seventh inning with a single. In the next inning, he grounded to shortstop and helped Danny Cater advance from second base to third, from where the latter eventually made the game-winning score.

In the next game, also against the Reds, Shockley appeared in the Phillies' starting lineup and faced pitcher John Tsitouris. Shockley was moved up from batting sixth to batting second versus Tsutouris. In five at-bats, Shockley made one hit, the first home run in his major league career, in a 4–14 loss. In the next day, he recorded two hits. After his first 16 at-bats in the major leagues, Shockley had an average of .250.

Afterwards, Shockley was reported by newspapers to have shown "good knowledge of the strike zone, an ability to hit major-league pitching and some power." Reports also stated that he "got his job done at first base", and that he "ran the bases well."

On July 29, Shockley was returned to the Arkansas Travelers due to the Phillies "desperately" needing right-handed hitters (Shockley was left-handed), according to manager Mauch. In the eight games in which he played for Philadelphia, Shockley had a .207 batting average (6-for-29) and scored one home run. By the end of the year with the Travelers, he had scored a league-best 36 home runs along with a league-leading 112 runs-batted-in. His batting average was .281, as Arkansas compiled a 95–61 record and won the division (later losing in the championship 3–4). He was among four members of the team named to the PCL All-Star squad and placed second (only behind Tony Perez) in the league MVP voting.

Shockley was recalled to the Phillies after the PCL season ended, and played in three more MLB games. He finished the 1964 season with the Phillies with a batting average of .229, two runs-batted-in and one home run.

In 1965, the Phillies sent Shockley, along with pitcher Rudy May, to the Los Angeles Angels in a trade for pitcher Bo Belinsky. It "took some cross country bickering" before he joined the Angels. When their training camp started in February, he stayed at his home in Georgetown "hunting ducks and rabbits back in Delaware with his prize setter named Lucy." The reason he did not join the team, according to Shockley, was because the Phillies had committed to giving him a $20,000 bonus after 30 days in MLB. Being two days away from that time, he demanded the Phillies give him the bonus if he should play two days with Los Angeles. Philadelphia, however, stated that they had never reached an agreement and that they had already paid Shockley the full amount of money on his contract. The Los Angeles general manager, Fred Haney, having felt no obligation to pay any of the $20,000, said "We will wait one week and then put Shockley on the failure-to-report list which voids that part of the trade." Eventually, after an appeal to MLB commissioner Ford Frick and a contract agreement with Los Angeles, Shockley signed a contract with the Angels on March 8 and joined the camp.

In spring training, Shockley batted .383, a team-leading average. On April 13, he appeared in the starting lineup on opening day against the Cleveland Indians. He was the fourth batter, playing against the Cleveland starting pitcher Ralph Terry. In his first appearance at the plate, Shockley made a single; the only hit he made in the game.

By the end of April, Shockley, who had only played against right-handed pitchers, had a batting average of just .120 (3-for-25). Against the Kansas City Royals in a May 2 doubleheader, Shockley batted fourth and made two doubles and scored three runs. Before nearly 5,000 fans in a game two days later, Shockley made "the singular moment of his career": against the Boston Red Sox starter Dave Morehead with the bases loaded in the fifth inning, Shockley "forced a fastball into the right-field pavilion" and scored his first career grand slam (as well as second career home run). Against the Minnesota Twins on May 13, Shockley hit a home run off pitcher Camilo Pascual. By May 17, his batting average had improved to .159.

On June 12, Shockley was assigned to the Seattle Angels, but refused to report. "In June, when I approached Rigney and asked if I was going to stay with the Angels, he said yes. So I moved my wife and baby out to California. Then (on June 12) they asked me to go to the minors instead, to Seattle. I wasn’t going to have my wife drive to Seattle. She didn’t know anything about the city." He was placed on the disqualified list on July 1 and his baseball career was over.

Shockley finished his MLB career with 51 games played, 142 times at-bat, 28 hits, two doubles, three home runs and 17 runs-batted-in for a batting average of .197.

== Later life and death ==
Shockley later returned to his hometown, where he raised his family and worked in construction.

In 1981, Shockley coached his son's Little League baseball team in Georgetown to the Senior League World Series championship.

Shockley was inducted into the Delaware Baseball Hall of Fame in 1976, into the Eastern Shore Baseball Hall of Fame in 1995, and into the Delaware Sports Museum and Hall of Fame in 1998.

Shockley died on May 30, 2022, after a battle with cancer. He was 80 at the time of his death.
