= 1964 Cincinnati Reds season =

1964 Cincinnati Reds
- League: National League
- Ballpark: Crosley Field
- City: Cincinnati
- Record: 92–70 (.568)
- Owner: Bill DeWitt
- General manager: Bill DeWitt
- Managers: Fred Hutchinson, Dick Sisler (acting)
- Television: WLWT (Ed Kennedy, Frank McCormick)
- Radio: WCKY (Waite Hoyt, Claude Sullivan)

The 1964 Cincinnati Reds season consisted of the Reds finishing in a tie for second place in the National League with the Philadelphia Phillies. Both teams were at 92–70, one game behind the NL and World Series champion St. Louis Cardinals. The Reds' home games were played at Crosley Field.

Fred Hutchinson had managed the Reds since July 1959, but his fight with lung cancer caused him to step aside in August with their record at 63–52 (.548). Coach Dick Sisler was named acting manager, and guided the team to a 29–18 (.617) record, but lost the final two games, both at home, to the Phillies. After formally resigning as manager in October, Hutchinson died several weeks later at age 45 on November 12; he was the first Reds member to have his number retired.

The 1964 season will long be remembered as one of the most exciting in MLB history, as both the National League and the American League saw multiple teams have chances to win the pennant in the last two weeks. The National League had three teams: the Cardinals, the Reds, and the Phillies, within a single game down the stretch, while the fourth-place Giants (3 games) and the fifth-place Braves (5) were within striking distance in the last month. The Phillies had double-digit lead with a month to go, but suffered a major collapse. But Philadelphia regained some momentum late by winning two games from the then first-place Reds including the last game of the year, to open the door for the Cardinals to win the pennant by one game over the Reds and the Phillies.

Reds players wore their last names on their uniform backs; the numbers were moved up and the names were below the numbers.

== Regular season ==
=== Season standings ===
National League
Team	W	L	Pct.	GB	Home	Road
St. Louis Cardinals	93	69	.574	—	48‍–‍33	45‍–‍36
Philadelphia Phillies	92	70	.568	1	46‍–‍35	46‍–‍35
Cincinnati Reds	92	70	.568	1	47‍–‍34	45‍–‍36
San Francisco Giants	90	72	.556	3	44‍–‍37	46‍–‍35
Milwaukee Braves	88	74	.543	5	45‍–‍36	43‍–‍38
Pittsburgh Pirates	80	82	.494	13	42‍–‍39	38‍–‍43
Los Angeles Dodgers	80	82	.494	13	41‍–‍40	39‍–‍42
Chicago Cubs	76	86	.469	17	40‍–‍41	36‍–‍45
Houston Colt .45s	66	96	.407	27	41‍–‍40	25‍–‍56
New York Mets	53	109	.327	40	33‍–‍48	20‍–‍61

=== Record vs. opponents ===
1964 National League record Sources:
Team	CHC	CIN	HOU	LAD	MIL	NYM	PHI	PIT	SF	STL
Chicago	—	6–12	11–7	10–8	8–10	11–7	6–12	9–9	9–9	6–12
Cincinnati	12–6	—	12–6	14–4–1	9–9	11–7	9–9	8–10	7–11	10–8
Houston	7–11	6–12	—	7–11	12–6	9–9	5–13	5–13	7–11	8–10
Los Angeles	8–10	4–14–1	11–7	—	8–10	15–3–1	8–10	10–8	6–12	10–8
Milwaukee	10–8	9–9	6–12	10–8	—	14–4	10–8	12–6	9–9	8–10
New York	7–11	7–11	9–9	3–15–1	4–14	—	3–15	6–12	7–11	7–11
Philadelphia	12-6	9–9	13–5	10–8	8–10	15–3	—	10–8	10–8	5–13
Pittsburgh	9–9	10–8	13–5	8–10	6–12	12–6	8–10	—	8–10	6–12
San Francisco	9–9	11–7	11–7	12–6	9–9	11–7	8–10	10–8	—	9–9
St. Louis	12–6	8–10	10–8	8–10	10–8	11–7	13–5	12–6	9–9	—

=== Notable transactions ===
- August 23, 1964: Jimmie Coker was purchased by the Reds from the Milwaukee Braves for $35,000.

=== Roster ===
1964 Cincinnati Reds
Roster
Pitchers: 53 Jim Dickson; 53,33 Ryne Duren; 32 Sammy Ellis; 44 Bill Henry; 30 Joey Jay; 46 Jim Maloney; 42 Billy McCool; 34 Chet Nichols Jr.; 41 Joe Nuxhall; 31 Jim O'Toole; 37 Bob Purkey; 38 John Tsitouris; 33 Al Worthington	Catchers: 7 Jimmie Coker; 6 Johnny Edwards; 8 Don Pavletich; 9 Hal Smith; Infielders: 10 Steve Boros; 16 Leo Cárdenas; 18 Gordy Coleman; 11 Deron Johnson; 12 Bobby Klaus; 24 Tony Pérez; 14 Pete Rose; 15 Chico Ruiz	Outfielders: 17 Tommy Harper; 25 Marty Keough; 28 Vada Pinson; 22 Mel Queen; 20 Frank Robinson; 24 Bob Skinner; Other batters: 50 Tommy Helms; 5 Johnny Temple	Manager: 1 Fred Hutchinson; 2 Dick Sisler; Coaches: 4 Reggie Otero; 36 Ray Shore; 2 Dick Sisler; 5 Johnny Temple; 3 Jim Turner

== Player stats ==
=== Batting ===
==== Starters by position ====
Note: Pos = Position; G = Games played; AB = At bats; H = Hits; Avg. = Batting average; HR = Home runs; RBI = Runs batted in

Pos	Player	G	AB	H	Avg.	HR	RBI
C	Johnny Edwards	126	423	119	.281	7	55
1B	Deron Johnson	140	477	130	.273	21	79
2B	Pete Rose	136	516	139	.269	4	34
3B	Steve Boros	117	370	95	.257	2	31
SS	Leo Cárdenas	163	597	150	.251	9	69
LF	Tommy Harper	102	317	77	.243	4	22
CF	Vada Pinson	156	625	166	.266	23	84
RF	Frank Robinson	156	568	174	.306	29	96

==== Other batters ====
Note: G = Games played; AB = At bats; H = Hits; Avg. = Batting average; HR = Home runs; RBI = Runs batted in

Player	G	AB	H	Avg.	HR	RBI
Chico Ruiz	77	311	76	.244	2	16
Marty Keough	109	276	71	.257	9	28
Gordy Coleman	89	198	48	.242	5	27
Mel Queen	48	95	19	.200	2	12
Bobby Klaus	40	93	17	.183	2	6
Don Pavletich	34	91	22	.242	5	11
Hal Smith	32	66	8	.121	0	3
Bob Skinner	25	59	13	.220	3	5
Jimmie Coker	11	32	10	.313	1	4
Tony Pérez	12	25	2	.080	0	1
Johnny Temple	6	3	0	.000	0	0
Tommy Helms	2	1	0	.000	0	0

=== Pitching ===
==== Starting pitchers ====
Note: G = Games pitched; IP = Innings pitched; W = Wins; L = Losses; ERA = Earned run average; SO = Strikeouts

Player	G	IP	W	L	ERA	SO
Jim O'Toole	30	220.0	17	7	2.66	145
Jim Maloney	31	216.0	15	10	2.71	214
Bob Purkey	34	195.2	11	9	3.04	78

==== Other pitchers ====
Note: G = Games pitched; IP = Innings pitched; W = Wins; L = Losses; ERA = Earned run average; SO = Strikeouts

Player	G	IP	W	L	ERA	SO
Joey Jay	34	183.0	11	11	3.39	134
John Tsitouris	37	175.1	9	13	3.80	146
Joe Nuxhall	32	154.2	9	8	4.07	111

==== Relief pitchers ====
Note: G = Games pitched; W = Wins; L = Losses; SV = Saves; ERA = Earned run average; SO = Strikeouts

Player	G	W	L	SV	ERA	SO
Sammy Ellis	52	10	3	14	2.57	125
Billy McCool	40	6	5	7	2.42	87
Bill Henry	37	2	2	6	0.87	28
Ryne Duren	26	0	2	1	2.89	39
Al Worthington	6	1	0	0	10.29	6
Jim Dickson	4	1	0	0	7.20	6
Chet Nichols Jr.	3	0	0	0	6.00	3

== Awards and honors ==
Gold Glove Award

- Johnny Edwards, catcher

=== All-Stars ===
All-Star Game

- Johnny Edwards, reserve
- Leo Cárdenas, reserve

== Farm system ==
Level	Team	League	Manager
AAA	San Diego Padres	Pacific Coast League	Dave Bristol
AA	Macon Peaches	Southern League	Red Davis
A	Peninsula Grays	Carolina League	Jack Cassini
A	Tampa Tarpons	Florida State League	Pinky May
A	Cedar Rapids Red Raiders	Midwest League	Rollie Hemsley

LEAGUE CHAMPIONS: San Diego
