= Clay Dalrymple =

American baseball player (born 1936)

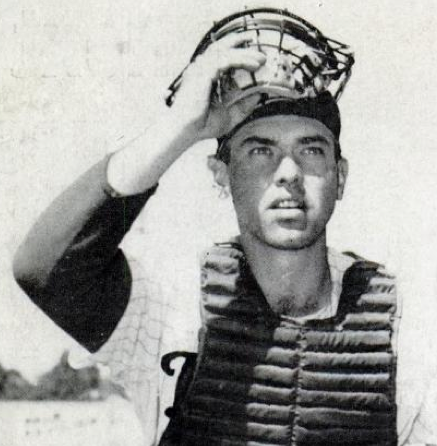
- Dalrymple in 1962
- Catcher
- Born: December 3, 1936 (age 89); Chico, California, U.S.
- Batted: Left Threw: Right

MLB debut
- April 24, 1960, for the Philadelphia Phillies

Last MLB appearance
- September 25, 1971, for the Baltimore Orioles

MLB statistics
- Batting average: .233
- Home runs: 55
- Runs batted in: 327
- Stats at Baseball Reference

Teams
- Philadelphia Phillies (1960–1968); Baltimore Orioles (1969–1971)

Clayton Errol Dalrymple (born December 3, 1936) is an American former professional baseball player. He played as a catcher in Major League Baseball for the Philadelphia Phillies (1960–1968) and Baltimore Orioles (1969–1971). Dalrymple was known for his strong throwing arm and solid defensive skills. Over his career, he threw out 48.8% of the base runners who attempted a stolen base, placing him 30th on the all-time list.

== Professional career ==
=== Early years (1956–1959) ===
Dalrymple attended Chico Senior High School and began his professional baseball career with the Sacramento Solons of the Pacific Coast League in 1956, and was obtained by the Milwaukee Braves before the 1959 season. The Braves invited him to their 1959 spring training camp where he received catching tips from veteran catchers Del Crandall and Del Rice. In November 1959 he was drafted by the Philadelphia Phillies from the Braves in the Rule 5 draft.

=== Philadelphia Phillies (1960–1968) ===
Dalrymple spent the 1960 season backing up Jimmie Coker, before taking over the starting catcher position for the Phillies in 1961. Although his offensive output peaked in 1962, he remained in the Phillies lineup due to his strong defensive skills. He was instrumental in helping the Phillies transform from perennial losers to pennant contenders by the 1964 season. With Dalrymple's guidance, the Phillies' pitching staff posted a 3.36 earned run average, and the team was in first place in the National League with 12 games left in the season. Unfortunately, the team suffered a 10-game losing streak in the final two weeks of the season, being overtaken by the St. Louis Cardinals and the Cincinnati Reds, and ending the season in a second-place tie with Cincinnati.

By 1968 Dalrymple had grown weary of the constant criticism of the Philadelphia fans and asked to be traded. His wish was granted when the Phillies traded him to the Baltimore Orioles for Ron Stone on January 21, 1969.

=== Baltimore Orioles (1969–1971) ===
Dalrymple backed up Elrod Hendricks and Andy Etchebarren, helping the Orioles win the American League championship, before losing to the Miracle Mets in the 1969 World Series. He made two pinch-hitting appearances in the '69 World Series, getting 2 singles in 2 at-bats in the third and fourth games. He suffered a broken ankle during the 1970 season and hadn't recovered in time to be activated for the Orioles' victory in the 1970 World Series. He played sparingly in 1971 during which the Orioles again won the American League championship, before losing to the Pittsburgh Pirates in the 1971 World Series. Dalrymple didn't play in any of the Orioles' postseason games that year. When the Orioles announced that they would assign him to their Triple-A team, the Rochester Red Wings, Dalrymple decided to retire from baseball.

=== Career statistics ===
In 12 major league seasons Dalrymple played in 1,079 games, accumulating 710 hits in 3,042 at bats for a .233 batting average along with 55 home runs and 327 runs batted in. He led National League catchers in assists in 1963, 1965 and 1967, and set a league record with 99 consecutive errorless games (and 628 chances) during 1966 and 1967 (since broken). On July 19, 1960, Dalrymple broke up a no hit bid by Juan Marichal (in his major league debut) with two outs in the eighth inning. He played the spoiler again on July 22, 1966, breaking up another no hit bid by Giants' pitcher Gaylord Perry — likewise in the 8th. In 1961, Dalrymple set a since-broken National League record for pick offs with 9. He led the National League in sacrifice flies (8) in 1964. He is the only batter ever to get a base hit off pitcher Nolan Ryan in a World Series game (1969, Game 3, 9th inning).
