= Wissman =

Wissman is a surname. Notable people with the surname include:

- Dave Wissman (born 1941), American baseball player
- Johan Wissman (born 1982), Swedish athlete

== See also ==
- Wissmann
