= Art Mahaffey =

American baseball player (born 1938)

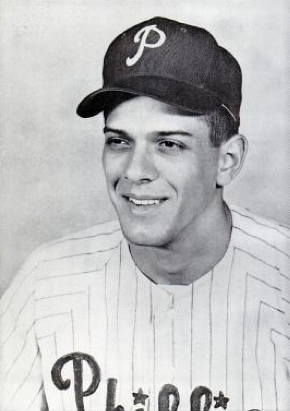
- Mahaffey in 1961
- Pitcher
- Born: June 4, 1938 (age 88); Cincinnati, Ohio, U.S.
- Batted: Right Threw: Right

MLB debut
- July 30, 1960, for the Philadelphia Phillies

Last MLB appearance
- July 17, 1966, for the St. Louis Cardinals

MLB statistics
- Win–loss record: 59–64
- Earned run average: 4.17
- Strikeouts: 639
- Stats at Baseball Reference

Teams
- Philadelphia Phillies (1960–1965); St. Louis Cardinals (1966)

Career highlights and awards
- 3× All-Star (1961, 1961², 1962²)

Arthur Mahaffey Jr. (born June 4, 1938) is an American former professional baseball starting pitcher, who played in Major League Baseball (MLB) for the National League (NL) Philadelphia Phillies (1960–1965) and St. Louis Cardinals (1966). He batted and threw right-handed. In a seven-season MLB career, Mahaffey posted a 59–64 record, with 639 strikeouts, and a 4.17 earned run average (ERA), in 999.0 innings pitched.

== Early life ==
Mahaffey was born on June 4, 1938, in Cincinnati, Ohio. He attended Western Hills High School in Cincinnati. His father had been a professional boxer, under the name Kid Mahaffey. He played high school and American Legion baseball.

Mahaffey's parents moved from their home of 22 years in Cincinnati, to another part of Cincinnati so Mahaffey could play baseball both at Western Hills under coach Paul Nohr, and for the French-Bauer Bentley Legion Post under coach Joe Hawk. The Bentley teams played 60-70 games a summer, and coach Hawk practiced the team four hours a day, even on game days. In addition to Mahaffey, other major league players who learned under Hawk included Don Zimmer, Herm Wehmeier, Dick Drott, Jim Brosnan and Russ Nixon.

Bentley was state champion in 1954, with Mahaffey as its star pitcher. In the same year, at just 16-years old, Mahaffey was an honorable mention selection to the Hamilton County Class A high school baseball All-Star Team. He had a 27–4 won–loss record in high school, and a 28–3 record for Bentley.

== Professional baseball ==
Mahaffey was signed as an amateur free agent by the Philadelphia Phillies on June 29, 1956. Ten teams had been interested in signing Mahaffey. He wanted to play for a National League team so he could play some games in his hometown, but thought he had a better chance of making the team with the Phillies rather than the Cincinnati Reds.

=== Minor leagues ===
Mahaffey pitched 4 1/2 seasons in the Phillies' farm system. He began his Minor League Baseball career in the summer of 1956, playing Class D baseball. In 1957 he played Class B and Class C baseball. At the Class C Salt Lake City Bees, ex-Brooklyn Dodger catcher and Bee's player-manager Cliff Dapper helped Mahaffey improve his control as a pitcher. Dapper would catch Mahaffey's games and set targets for Mahaffey on the inside and outside of the plate, teaching Mahaffey how to move the ball while pitching.

Overall in those two years he had a 16–15 won–loss record and his earned run average (ERA) was never below 4.79. His pitching improved considerably in 1958. After a positive spring training with the Phillies, he was assigned to the Single-A Williamsport Grays, playing in only three games. He then played with the Class B Highpoint-Thomasville Hi-Toms of the Carolina League, under manager Frank Lucchesi. He had a 5–1 record and 2.12 ERA in six starts, before missing the second half of the 1958 season after having either an appendectomy or hernia.

Now 20-years old, Mahaffey began the 1959 season with the Triple-A Buffalo Bisons. He did not pitch well in his only start. The team believed he needed more experience and an opportunity to pitch more regularly, and sent him back to Williamsport. At Williamsport, Mahaffey had an 8–0 record in nine starts, with a 1.67 ERA. He was recalled to Buffalo in June, winning five of his first six decisions by early August. At one point he had 12 consecutive wins between the two teams. Overall, he was 8–5 with a 4.42 ERA at Buffalo in 1959, with 81 strikeouts and 47 bases-on-balls in 108 innings pitched.

In 1960, Mahaffey pitched in 22 games for Buffalo, with an 11–9 record and 3.74 ERA, before being called up to the Phillies on July 28.

=== Major leagues ===
==== Philadelphia Phillies ====
Mahaffey played in his first Phillies game on July 30, 1960. He pitched the final two innings of a game against the St. Louis Cardinals. He retired the three batters he faced in the seventh inning. In the eighth, Bill White led off with a single to right field and then was picked off by Mahaffey at first base. The next batter, Curt Flood, singled to center field, and he, too, was picked off by Mahaffey, who threw to first with Flood tagged out on a throw from first to second. In his very next game, against the San Francisco Giants, Mahaffey picked off the next hitter to get a base hit against him, Jim Marshall.

Mahaffey won his first four games as a Phillies pitcher. In only his second winning start, he pitched a complete game six-hitter in a 3–2 victory over the Milwaukee Braves, led by future Hall of Famers Hank Aaron and Eddie Mathews (who hit a two-run home run). He finished the 1960 Phillies' season with a 7–3 record, an ERA of 2.31, 14 games played, while finishing third in the 1960 NL Rookie of the Year balloting (which was won by Frank Howard of the Los Angeles Dodgers).

Mahaffey set a club record with 17 strikeouts in a game against the Chicago Cubs on April 23, 1961. Though he ended the 1961 season with an ERA of 4.10, and a record of 11–19 (leading the NL in losses), in 36 games, he was selected to represent the Phillies on both 1961 NL All-Star teams; pitching two scoreless innings in the July 31 game that ended it the first tie in All-Star game history. The team finished in last place, winning only 47 games and losing 107. Mahaffey did not win a game from June 25 to August 22, but on August 22 he pitched a one-hit shutout against the Chicago Cubs. Only a slow hop single by future Hall of Fame third baseman Ron Santo in the first inning kept Mahaffey from a no-hitter.

In 1962, Mahaffey pitched the NL's opening day game against the Reds, and would go on to have his best season. Mahaffey ended the 1962 season with a record of 19–14, and a 3.94 ERA, with a career high 177 strikeouts, in 41 games, completing 20 of 39 starts. He was selected again in 1962 for the NL All-Star Team, and was the losing pitcher in the game, giving up three runs in two innings. He finished 26th in balloting for NL Most Valuable Player (MVP), despite leading the league in home runs allowed with 36, and earned runs allowed with 120. He pitched 274 innings that year, despite having a sore arm.

On April 29, 1963, Mahaffey became the first Phillie to appear on the cover of Sports Illustrated. Mahaffey had a 7–10 record in 26 games with the 1963 Phillies, to go along with a 3.99 ERA. In 1964, he finished the season with a record of 12–9, with an ERA of 4.52, in 34 games.

The ill-fated 1964 team was in first place in the NL, with a 6 1/2-game lead, with just 12 games remaining in the season, before starting a 10-game losing streak that cost the team the pennant. Going into September, Mahaffey was 12–6. He pitched in two of the games in that infamous skid. He lost a 1–0 game (the first of that losing streak) on a steal of home by Chico Ruiz of the Cincinnati Reds, with Hall of Famer Frank Robinson at bat, and without Ruiz's manager knowing he was going to try and steal home. On September 26, Mahaffey was taken out after seven innings while winning 4–3 in a game against the Milwaukee Braves. Braves' rookie Rico Carty, who had a .330 batting average that year, hit a ninth-inning bases-loaded triple, plating all 3 runners, off of reliever Bobby Shantz (on Shantz's 39th birthday), to win the game for the Braves, 6-4.

Mahaffey and others wondered why manager Gene Mauch had used the lefthanded Shantz against the righthanded Carty in that situation. Righthander Ed Roebuck came in to relieve Shantz. Shantz had come to the Phillies in mid-August, and had pitched well in the final month-and-a-half of his 16-year career, only giving up seven runs in 31.1 innings pitched (2.01 ERA). The game against the Braves was the last appearance of his career.

1965 was Mahaffey's last season in Philadelphia. He finished with a 2–5 record, and an ERA of 6.21, in 22 games, mostly in relief. Over his career as a Phillie, Mahaffey was 59–64 with a 4.17 ERA and 46 complete games and nine shutouts.

==== Injuries ====
During his career, Mahaffey suffered a variety of injuries, in addition to his minor league bout of appendicitis or having a hernia. He had arm ailments. He was hit in the head as a baserunner in a 1961 game against the Cincinnati Reds by Eddie Kasko from only two-three feet away, who was throwing the ball to first base during a double play. The throw gave Mahaffey a concussion and broke his cheek, and he missed the season's last 25 days. As the game was in Cincinnati, Mahaffey's parents were in attendance. Mahaffey was in the hospital for five days without getting up, and suffered throbbing headaches for months. He also suffered a shoulder injury during a basepath collision, as well as a dislocated ankle while pitching.

==== Final years ====
Mahaffey was traded by the Phillies on October 27, 1965, along with catcher Pat Corrales, and outfielder Alex Johnson, to the Cardinals, in exchange for shortstop Dick Groat, catcher Bob Uecker, and first baseman Bill White. In his only season with the Cards, he had a 1–4 record, in 12 games, with an ERA of 6.43. Mahaffey was the starting pitcher in his final big league game, on July 17, 1966, in the second game of a doubleheader against the Chicago Cubs; that day, he gave up three hits, and three runs, in 1/3 of an inning, in a game the Cubs won by a score of 7–2.

He played part of the 1966 season for the Triple-A Tulsa Oilers, the Cardinals affiliate in the Pacific Coast League, where he was 4–4 with a 5.05 ERA. In 1967, Mahaffey was dealt along with Jerry Buchek and Tony Martínez from the Cardinals to the New York Mets for Ed Bressoud, Danny Napoleon and cash on April 1, 1967. In early 1967, he unsuccessfully tried out for the Giants. He split the 1967 season, his last, between the Mets' Triple-A affiliate, the Jacksonville Suns, and the Chicago Cubs' Double-A affiliate, the Dallas-Fort Worth Spurs, and never again played in the major leagues, retiring at age 29.

== Personal life ==
Mahaffey married his high school classmate Catherine (Hollenbeck) Mahaffey; a dietician who helped the very thin Mahaffey gain weight when he was beginning his professional career. After baseball, he owned an insurance brokerage business. He arranged a golf tournament to help longtime teammate and friend Chris Short with medical bills, after Short suffered a cerebral aneurysm in 1988, and helped set up a scholarship at the University of Delaware in Short's name.

As of 2024, Mahaffey resides with his wife Janet in the Allentown, Pennsylvania area

== Highlights ==
- Two time All-Star (1961–62)
- Picked off the first three players who had base hits against him: Curt Flood and Bill White of the St. Louis Cardinals (July 30, 1960) and Jim Marshall of the San Francisco Giants (July 31, 1960). He had 13 pickoffs and four balks in his career.
- On April 23, 1961, struck out 17 Chicago Cubs to set a Phillies team record, including Don Zimmer, Frank Thomas, and Hall of famers Ron Santo, Ernie Banks three times each. The Phillies' Curt Short struck out 18 in a game, but that game went 18 innings. Mahaffey also tied the since-broken National League record for most strikeouts in a day game.
- In 1962, Mahaffey became the last pitcher to strike out at least 12 batters and hit a grand slam in a game.
