= Ray Culp =

American baseball player (born 1941)

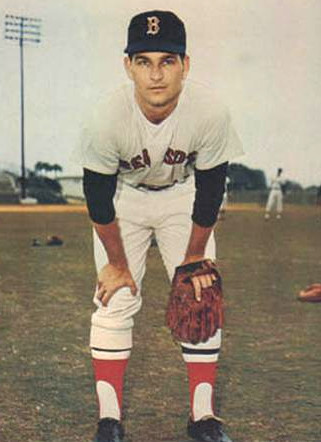
- Pitcher
- Born: August 6, 1941 (age 85); Elgin, Texas, U.S.
- Batted: Right Threw: Right

MLB debut
- April 10, 1963, for the Philadelphia Phillies

Last MLB appearance
- September 3, 1973, for the Boston Red Sox

MLB statistics
- Win–loss record: 122–101
- Earned run average: 3.58
- Strikeouts: 1,411
- Stats at Baseball Reference

Teams
- Philadelphia Phillies (1963–1966); Chicago Cubs (1967); Boston Red Sox (1968–1973)

Career highlights and awards
- 2× All-Star (1963, 1969)

Raymond Leonard Culp Jr. (born August 6, 1941) is an American former professional baseball pitcher. He played in Major League Baseball (MLB) for the Philadelphia Phillies (1963–1966), Chicago Cubs (1967), and Boston Red Sox (1968–1973).

== Early life ==
Culp was born on August 6, 1941, in Elgin, Texas. He attended Stephen F. Austin High School (Austin, Texas). He ran track and played baseball and basketball in high school. As a junior pitcher in 1958, Culp won six postseason games, including a no-hitter, in leading the team to the state title. Over two seasons in 1958 and 1959, he had 18 consecutive wins, finally losing a 1–0 game in 1959 in the state tournament.

Danny Cater, an Austin high school baseball rival who attended William B. Travis High School, would become Culp's teammate on the Williamsport Grays, the 1964 Phillies and the 1972 Red Sox.

== MLB career ==
At 17, Culp was offered contracts with 15 of the 16 major league baseball teams, signing as an undrafted free agent with the Philadelphia Phillies for $100,000. While still 17, he was assigned to the Johnson City Phillies of the Appalachian League, where he played in four games. From 1960 to 1962, Culp pitched for four minor league teams, none higher than Single-A baseball. In 1962, he played for the Williamsport Grays of the Eastern League, with a 3.20 earned run average (ERA), and a 13-8 win-loss record.

=== Philadelphia Phillies ===
Culp began the 1963 season with the Phillies. His first appearance was as a relief pitcher (a win for him over the Cincinnati Reds), but soon became a starting pitcher. His first year was an impressive one, starting 30 games as he compiled a 14–11 win–loss record for the Phillies and a 2.97 ERA. He also had five shutouts. He was eighth in the National League (NL) in strikeouts, although his control was somewhat shaky, leading the league in walks with 102.

As a rookie, he made the 1963 NL All-Star squad and went on to retire Al Kaline, Frank Malzone, and Carl Yastrzemski (around a Leon Wagner single), in a scoreless fifth inning of the Senior Circuit's 5–3 victory. He was named the National League's Rookie Pitcher of the Year by The Sporting News.

In 1964, Culp suffered from a recurring sore arm. His ERA went up to 4.12, and he started only 19 games with an 8–7 record. His pitching problems may have been part of the Phillies collapse during the pennant race that year, where the team had a 6.5 game lead in first place with 12 games to play, and lost out in the pennant race to the St. Louis Cardinals. Despite the injury, he did pitch a one-hitter on June 23, 1964, against the Chicago Cubs. In 1965, Culp was much improved, starting 30 games, with a 14–10 record and a 3.22 ERA for the Phillies. 1966 was Culp's worst season in Philadelphia. He started only 12 of 34 games he appeared in, and had a 5.04 ERA.

=== Cubs and Red Sox ===
In December 1966, he was traded (with cash) to the Chicago Cubs for pitcher Dick Ellsworth. He pitched one year for the Cubs, and was 8–11 with a 3.89 ERA. In November 1967 he was traded to the Boston Red Sox for Bill Schlesinger and cash. He played with the Red Sox from 1968 to 1973, ending his career there.

Culp returned to the All-Star game in 1969, pitching a perfect ninth inning for the American League (AL). He retired Pete Rose (on a foul pop fly) and struck out Randy Hundley and Tony Pérez.

He strung together four steady seasons for the Red Sox from 1968–1971, winning between 14 and 17 games in each. None of his teams during Culp's career appeared in a postseason game.

In 11 seasons he had a 122–101 win–loss record, 322 games, 268 games started, 80 complete games, 22 shutouts, 21 games finished, 1 save, 1,898 1/3 innings pitched, 1,677 hits allowed, 863 runs allowed, 755 earned runs allowed, 188 home runs allowed, 752 walks allowed, 1,411 strikeouts, 70 hit batsmen, 73 wild pitches, 8,066 batters faced, 58 intentional walks, 3 balks, and a 3.58 ERA.

== Career after baseball ==
After retiring from baseball, Culp became the successful owner of a real estate business in Austin.

== Legacy and honors ==
- Selected by The Sporting News as National League Rookie Pitcher of the Year, 1963
- Named to the 1963 National League All-Star Team and the 1969 American League All-Star Team
- Led the National League in hit batsmen (tied at 12, with Jim Bunning and Don Drysdale, 1965) the American League (tied at 11 with Bob Johnson, 1970)
- Led the National League in walks allowed (102) (1963)
- Ranks 124th on the MLB career hits allowed per nine innings pitched list (7.95), as of 2024
- Ranks 243rd on the MLB career strikeouts per nine innings pitched list (6.69)
