= Wissmann =

Wissmann is a German surname. Notable people with the surname include:

- Hermann Wissmann (1853–1905), German explorer and administrator in Africa, who gave his name to:
  - Wissmann Bay at the northern tip of Lake Malawi
  - Hermann von Wissmann (steamship) 1890, anti-slavery gunboat
- Matthias Wissmann (born 1949), German politician and automobile lobbyist

== See also ==
- Wissman
