= Dick Ellsworth =

American baseball player (1940–2022)

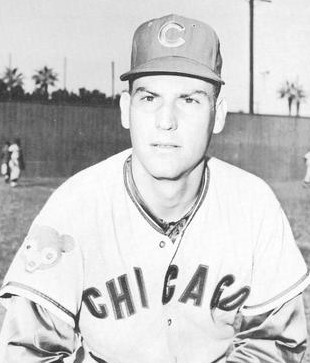
- Pitcher
- Born: March 22, 1940; Lusk, Wyoming, U.S.
- Died: October 10, 2022 (aged 82); Fresno, California, U.S.
- Batted: Left Threw: Left

MLB debut
- June 22, 1958, for the Chicago Cubs

Last MLB appearance
- June 23, 1971, for the Milwaukee Brewers

MLB statistics
- Win–loss record: 115–137
- Earned run average: 3.72
- Strikeouts: 1,140
- Stats at Baseball Reference

Teams
- Chicago Cubs (1958–1966); Philadelphia Phillies (1967); Boston Red Sox (1968–1969); Cleveland Indians (1969–1970); Milwaukee Brewers (1970–1971)

Career highlights and awards
- All-Star (1964)

Richard Clark Ellsworth (March 22, 1940 – October 10, 2022) was an American professional baseball starting pitcher, who played in Major League Baseball (MLB) for the Chicago Cubs (1958, 1960–1966), Philadelphia Phillies (1967), Boston Red Sox (1968–1969), Cleveland Indians (1969–1970), and Milwaukee Brewers (1970–1971). Ellsworth was an All-Star in 1964.

== Career ==
Ellsworth was born in Lusk, Wyoming. When he was three years old, his family moved to Fresno, California. He played amateur baseball in Fresno as a teammate with future major leaguers Jim Maloney and Pat Corrales. Ellsworth graduated from Fresno High School in 1958.

In 1958, Gene Handley scouted and signed Ellsworth for the Chicago Cubs for a reported signing bonus of $70,000. After pitching well in an exhibition game against the Chicago White Sox, the Cubs had Ellsworth make his major league debut on June 22 against the Cincinnati Reds. Ellsworth allowed four runs, two wild pitches, and one hit by pitch before the Cubs took him out of the game. The Cubs sent him to the Fort Worth Cats of the Double A Texas League. After he spent the rest of the 1958 season and the entire 1959 season in the minor leagues, the Cubs promoted him to the major leagues for good in 1960.

Ellsworth won the National League Player of the Month Award in May 1963 as he allowed six earned runs in 42 innings pitched. For the 1963 season, he had a 22–10 win–loss record and a 2.10 earned run average (ERA). After the season, he won the Associated Press' Comeback Player of the Year Award, as he had finished the 1962 season with a 9–20 record. On July 28, 1963, Cubs' lefty Dick Ellsworth struck out Stan Musial three times in the Cubs' 5-1 victory over the Cardinals in a game played at Wrigley Field. Ellsworth made the National League All-Star team in 1964.

After the 1966 season, the Cubs traded Ellsworth to the Philadelphia Phillies for Ray Culp. He had a 6–7 record and a 4.39 ERA for Philadelphia. After the 1967 season, the Phillies traded Ellsworth and Gene Oliver to the Boston Red Sox for Mike Ryan and cash considerations. He was traded along with Ken Harrelson and Juan Pizarro from the Red Sox to the Cleveland Indians for Sonny Siebert, Vicente Romo and Joe Azcue on April 19, 1969. On August 7, 1970, the Milwaukee Brewers purchased Ellsworth from Cleveland. Ellsworth returned to Milwaukee for the 1971 season. He had a 4.91 ERA for Milwaukee, and was placed on waivers in June.

In 1963, Ellsworth was inducted into the Fresno County Athletic Hall of Fame.

== Personal life ==
During the baseball off-seasons during his career, Ellsworth sold Serta mattresses. After his playing career, Ellsworth went into real estate. In 2005, Ellsworth joined an ownership group that purchased the Fresno Grizzlies of the Pacific Coast League.

He was the father of former MLB pitcher Steve Ellsworth.

Ellsworth died in Fresno on October 10, 2022, at the age of 82.

Awards and achievements
Preceded by Jack Sanford	Major League Player of the Month; May 1963	Succeeded by Ron Santo
