= Dick Estelle =

American baseball player (born 1942)

- Pitcher
- Born: January 18, 1942 (age 84); Lakewood Township, New Jersey, U.S.
- Batted: Switch Threw: Left

MLB debut
- September 4, 1964, for the San Francisco Giants

Last MLB appearance
- October 3, 1965, for the San Francisco Giants

MLB statistics
- Win–loss record: 1–2
- Earned run average: 3.23
- Strikeouts: 29
- Stats at Baseball Reference

Teams
- San Francisco Giants (1964–1965)

Richard Henry Estelle (born January 18, 1942) is an American former Major League Baseball pitcher who pitched for the San Francisco Giants in 1964 and 1965. Estelle was inducted into the Lakewood High School Hall of Fame in 2006.
