= Frank Bork =

American baseball player (born 1940)

- Pitcher
- Born: July 13, 1940 (age 86); Buffalo, New York, U.S.
- Batted: Right Threw: Left

MLB debut
- April 15, 1964, for the Pittsburgh Pirates

Last MLB appearance
- October 3, 1964, for the Pittsburgh Pirates

MLB statistics
- Win–loss record: 2–2
- Earned run average: 4.07
- Strikeouts: 31
- Stats at Baseball Reference

Teams
- Pittsburgh Pirates (1964)

Frank Bernard Bork (born July 13, 1940) is an American former professional baseball pitcher whose eight-year career included part of one season, 1964, in Major League Baseball as a member of the Pittsburgh Pirates. The left-hander, a native of Buffalo, New York, was listed as 6 feet 2 inches (1.88 m) tall and 175 pounds (79 kg).

Bork was signed by the Pirates as an amateur free agent in 1960. He spent four full years in their farm system before breaking into the big leagues. His finest minor league season was 1962 when he went 19–7, with a 2.00 ERA for the Kinston Eagles of the Carolina League.

Bork made it to Pittsburgh in 1964 and saw action in 33 games that season, 31 in relief. He compiled a record of 2–2 with two saves and an ERA of 4.07. In 42 total innings pitched, he allowed 51 hits and 11 bases on balls, with 31 strikeouts.

Bork returned to the minors where he remained for the rest of his career. He retired following the 1967 season.

Following his baseball career, he lived and worked in Dublin, Ohio.
