= Dave Wissman =

American baseball player (born 1941)

- Outfielder
- Born: February 17, 1941; Greenfield, Massachusetts, U.S.
- Batted: Left Threw: Right

MLB debut
- September 15, 1964, for the Pittsburgh Pirates

Last MLB appearance
- October 4, 1964, for the Pittsburgh Pirates

MLB statistics
- Games played: 16
- At bats: 27
- Hits: 4
- Stats at Baseball Reference

Teams
- Pittsburgh Pirates (1964)

David Alvin Wissman (born February 17, 1941) is an American former professional baseball player who appeared in 16 games during part of one season in Major League Baseball for the Pittsburgh Pirates in 1964, primarily as a left fielder. The native of Greenfield, Massachusetts, batted left-handed, threw right-handed, and was listed as 6 feet 2 inches (1.88 m) tall and 178 pounds (81 kg). He attended the University of Bridgeport.

Wissman was signed by the Pirates as an amateur free agent in 1961 and was recalled to Pittsburgh after his fourth minor-league season in 1964. He started four games, and otherwise appeared as a pinch hitter or defensive replacement. In his 16 MLB games, he collected four hits in 27 at bats, all singles, for a .148 batting average, with two runs scored. He played through the 1967 minor-league campaign before leaving the game.
