= Chris Short =

American baseball player (1937–1991)

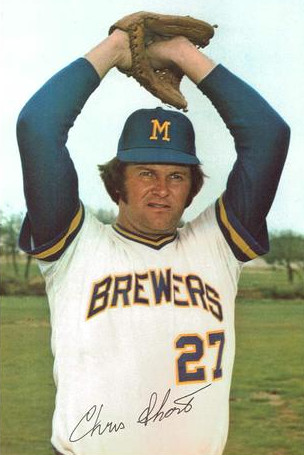
- Short in 1973
- Pitcher
- Born: September 19, 1937; Milford, Delaware, U.S.
- Died: August 1, 1991 (aged 53); Wilmington, Delaware, U.S.
- Batted: Right Threw: Left

MLB debut
- April 19, 1959, for the Philadelphia Phillies

Last MLB appearance
- September 18, 1973, for the Milwaukee Brewers

MLB statistics
- Win–loss record: 135–132
- Earned run average: 3.43
- Strikeouts: 1,629
- Stats at Baseball Reference

Teams
- Philadelphia Phillies (1959–1972); Milwaukee Brewers (1973)

Career highlights and awards
- 2× All-Star (1964, 1967); Philadelphia Phillies Wall of Fame

Christopher Joseph Short (September 19, 1937 – August 1, 1991), nicknamed "Styles", was an American professional baseball pitcher, who played in Major League Baseball (MLB) for the Philadelphia Phillies (1959–1972) and Milwaukee Brewers (1973). He threw left-handed, and batted right-handed.

== Early life ==
Short was born in Milford, Delaware, on September 19, 1937. He was the son of Issac Short, a Delaware judge who had attended the University of Pennsylvania. Short attended Lewes High School for three years, where he played center on the basketball team and pitcher on the baseball team. In his 1955 season at Lewes, he finished with a 9–1 record, allowing 23 hits, 6 walks, and striking out 121 batters. In 1956, he was the fourth leading scorer in Delaware high school basketball, finishing the season with 374 points. He graduated high school from the Bordentown Military Institute.

== Baseball career ==
Short made his first appearance on the mound on April 19, 1959, against the Cincinnati Reds, appearing in the 2nd inning to replace Jim Owens. He allowed five runs on four hits while striking out three and walking three in 3.2 innings.

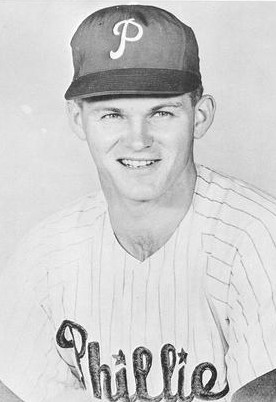
Short, circa 1963

Short was considered a top pitcher from 1964 through 1968 with the Phillies. He was 17–9 in 1964, with a 2.20 ERA in 220 2/3 innings pitched. It was his career-best ERA and was third in the league behind only Sandy Koufax (1.74) and Don Drysdale (2.18). Teammate Jim Bunning was 5th that season with a 2.63 ERA. Juan Marichal finished 4th (2.48). That year, however, the Phillies and Short suffered a historic collapse in the pennant race. After leading by six and a half games with 12 to go, manager Gene Mauch decided to start his two aces, Bunning and Short, for eight of the last 12 games. Short pitched respectably despite the heavy workload, giving up only six earned runs in 18 innings over his final three starts. But weak hitting, ineffective relief pitching and poor defense (the team committed 17 errors in a 10-game losing streak) doomed Philadelphia. The Phillies lost three games in a row to the hot St. Louis Cardinals, who won the NL race by 1 game and defeated the New York Yankees in the 1964 World Series.

On October 2, 1965, Short threw 15 shutout innings at Shea Stadium, striking out 18 Mets only to receive a no-decision. The game would end in a scoreless tie after 18 innings. Short ended up winning 55 games from 1964 through 1966, topping off with a 20–10 record in 1966. A back injury during the 1969 season would curtail his season while also proving to hurt his career.

Short's contract was purchased by the Milwaukee Brewers from its then-Triple-A affiliate Evansville Triplets on April 5, 1973. His final appearance on the mound was on September 18, 1973, against the Cleveland Indians. He entered in relief of Jim Colborn in the ninth inning, trying to preserve a 5–4 lead with a runner on second base. Facing John Ellis, Short allowed a home run as the Indians won the game 6–5.

In 15 seasons, Short finished with a 135–132 record, just over a .500 winning percentage (.506). He had a career ERA of 3.43 and 1629 career strikeouts in 501 games (308 starts). He allowed 886 earned runs in 2325 innings pitched. He was only ejected once, on May 25, 1971 (a game in which he was not pitching), for bench jockeying.

Short ranks 4th among Phillies pitchers all-time in wins (132), 5th in games appeared in (459), 3rd in games started (301), 19th in complete games (88), 4th in shutouts (24), 4th in innings pitched (2253), and 4th in strikeouts (1585).

== After baseball ==
In 1979, Short was inducted into the Delaware Sports Hall of Fame. Between 1985 and 1988, Short taught young pitchers at Suburban Baseball Camp, which was held at Barness Park in Warrington, Pennsylvania. He suffered from diabetes in his later years, along with trying to support his three sons. While working for a Wilmington insurance agency in October 1988, he suffered a ruptured brain aneurysm, lapsing into a coma. He died on August 1, 1991, in a convalescent home, having never regained consciousness. He was posthumously named to the Philadelphia Baseball Wall of Fame the following year.

In 2016 Short was one of 16 new members inducted to the Philadelphia Sports Hall of Fame.
