= 1964 Major League Baseball All-Star Game =

1964 American baseball competition

	1	2	3	4	5	6	7	8	9	R	H	E
American League	1	0	0	0	0	2	1	0	0	4	9	1
National League	0	0	0	2	1	0	0	0	4	7	8	0
- Date: July 7, 1964
- Venue: Shea Stadium
- City: Queens, New York City, New York
- Managers: Al López (CWS); Walter Alston (LAD)
- MVP: Johnny Callison (PHI)
- Attendance: 50,850
- Television: NBC
- TV announcers: Lindsey Nelson and Buddy Blattner
- Radio: NBC
- Radio announcers: Blaine Walsh and Dan Daniels

The 1964 Major League Baseball All-Star Game was the 35th midseason exhibition between the all-stars of the American League (AL) and the National League (NL), the two leagues comprising Major League Baseball. The game was played on July 7, 1964, at Shea Stadium in Queens, New York City, home of the New York Mets of the National League. The game was a 7–4 victory for the NL. Johnny Callison hit a walk-off home run, the most recent MLB All-Star game to end in such a fashion.

== Game summary ==
National League starter Don Drysdale gave up a leadoff single to Jim Fregosi, who scored on a passed ball and single by Harmon Killebrew.

The NL took the lead in the fourth on a pair of home runs by Billy Williams and Ken Boyer off AL reliever John Wyatt, then made it 3–1 in the fifth on a Roberto Clemente single and Dick Groat double off Camilo Pascual.

The score was tied in the sixth when Mickey Mantle and Killebrew singled and scored on a Brooks Robinson triple to right-center. The AL regained the lead 4–3 in the seventh. Elston Howard was hit by a pitch by Turk Farrell, took third on a Rocky Colavito double and scored on Fregosi's sacrifice fly.

It remained 4–3 until the bottom of the ninth. Dick Radatz issued a leadoff walk to Willie Mays, who stole second. Orlando Cepeda singled him home with the tying run and took second on an error. With Curt Flood pinch-running for Cepeda and Johnny Edwards on first with an intentional walk, Johnny Callison's three-run homer to deep right field ended the game.

== Roster ==
Players in italics have since been inducted into the National Baseball Hall of Fame.

=== American League ===
Starters
Position	Player	Team	All-Star Games
P	Dean Chance	Angels	1
C	Elston Howard	Yankees	11
1B	Bob Allison	Twins	3
2B	Bobby Richardson	Yankees	6
3B	Brooks Robinson	Orioles	8
SS	Jim Fregosi	Angels	1
OF	Harmon Killebrew	Twins	6
OF	Mickey Mantle	Yankees	17
OF	Tony Oliva	Twins	1

Pitchers
Position	Player	Team	All-Star Games
P	Whitey Ford	Yankees	10
P	Jack Kralick	Indians	1
P	Camilo Pascual	Twins	7
P	Gary Peters	White Sox	1
P	Juan Pizarro	White Sox	2
P	Dick Radatz	Red Sox	2
P	John Wyatt	Athletics	1

Reserves
Position	Player	Team	All-Star Games
C	Bill Freehan	Tigers	1
1B	Joe Pepitone	Yankees	2
1B	Norm Siebern	Athletics	4
2B	Jerry Lumpe	Tigers	1
3B	Frank Malzone	Red Sox	8
SS	Luis Aparicio-x	Orioles	10
SS	Eddie Bressoud-y	Red Sox	1
OF	Rocky Colavito-y	Tigers	7
OF	Jimmie Hall	Twins	1
OF	Chuck Hinton	Senators	1
OF	Al Kaline-x	Tigers	13

=== National League ===
Starters
Position	Player	Team	All-Star Games
P	Don Drysdale	Dodgers	6
C	Joe Torre	Braves	2
1B	Orlando Cepeda	Giants	10
2B	Ron Hunt	Mets	1
3B	Ken Boyer	Cardinals	11
SS	Dick Groat	Cardinals	8
OF	Roberto Clemente	Pirates	8
OF	Willie Mays	Giants	15
OF	Billy Williams	Cubs	2

Pitchers
Position	Player	Team	All-Star Games
P	Jim Bunning	Phillies	8
P	Dick Ellsworth	Cubs	1
P	Turk Farrell	Colt .45s	4
P	Sandy Koufax	Dodgers	5
P	Juan Marichal	Giants	4
P	Chris Short	Phillies	1

Reserves
Position	Player	Team	All-Star Games
C	Smoky Burgess	Pirates	9
C	Johnny Edwards	Reds	2
1B	Bill White	Cardinals	7
2B	Bill Mazeroski	Pirates	9
3B	Ron Santo	Cubs	2
SS	Leo Cárdenas	Reds	1
OF	Hank Aaron	Braves	14
OF	Johnny Callison	Phillies	3
OF	Curt Flood	Cardinals	1
OF	Willie Stargell	Pirates	1

x – replaced due to injury

y – replacement for injured player

== Game ==
=== Starting lineups ===
American League				National League			
Order	Player	Team	Position	Order	Player	Team	Position
1	Jim Fregosi	Angels	SS	1	Roberto Clemente	Pirates	RF
2	Tony Oliva	Twins	RF	2	Dick Groat	Cardinals	SS
3	Mickey Mantle	Yankees	CF	3	Billy Williams	Cubs	LF
4	Harmon Killebrew	Twins	LF	4	Willie Mays	Giants	CF
5	Bob Allison	Twins	1B	5	Orlando Cepeda	Giants	1B
6	Brooks Robinson	Orioles	3B	6	Ken Boyer	Cardinals	3B
7	Bobby Richardson	Yankees	2B	7	Joe Torre	Braves	C
8	Elston Howard	Yankees	C	8	Ron Hunt	Mets	2B
9	Dean Chance	Angels	P	9	Don Drysdale	Dodgers	P

=== Umpires ===
Position	Umpire
Home Plate	Ed Sudol (NL)
First Base	Joe Paparella (AL)
Second Base	Frank Secory (NL)
Third Base	Nestor Chylak (AL)
Left Field	Doug Harvey (NL)
Right Field	Al Salerno (AL)

=== Line score ===
Tuesday, July 7, 1964 1:00 pm (ET) at Shea Stadium in Queens, New York
Team	1	2	3	4	5	6	7	8	9	R	H	E
American League	1	0	0	0	0	2	1	0	0	4	9	1
National League	0	0	0	2	1	0	0	0	4	7	8	0
WP: Juan Marichal (1–0) LP: Dick Radatz (0–1); Home runs: AL: None; NL: Billy Williams (1), Ken Boyer (1), Johnny Callison (1)
