= John Tsitouris =

American baseball player (1936–2015)

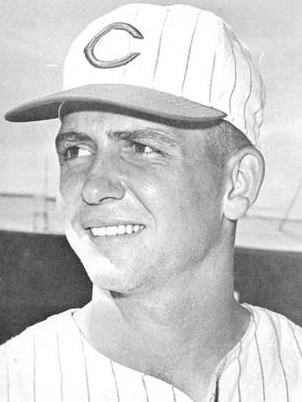
- Pitcher
- Born: May 5, 1936; Monroe, North Carolina, U.S.
- Died: October 22, 2015 (aged 79); Monroe, North Carolina, U.S.
- Batted: Right Threw: Right

MLB debut
- June 13, 1957, for the Detroit Tigers

Last MLB appearance
- April 24, 1968, for the Cincinnati Reds

MLB statistics
- Win–loss record: 34–38
- Earned run average: 4.13
- Strikeouts: 432
- Stats at Baseball Reference

Teams
- Detroit Tigers (1957); Kansas City Athletics (1958–1960); Cincinnati Reds (1962–1968)

John Philip Tsitouris (/sɪˈtʊərɪs/ sih-TOOR-ihs; May 4, 1936 – October 22, 2015) was an American professional baseball player who pitched in the Major Leagues from 1957 to 1960 and 1962–68. He threw and batted right-handed, stood 6 feet (1.8 m) tall and weighed 175 pounds (79 kg).

Tsitouris graduated from Benton Heights High School in Monroe, North Carolina. He signed with the Detroit Tigers in 1954 and made his MLB debut with the Tigers on June 13, 1957. Coming into a scoreless tie in relief of Steve Gromek in the fifth inning of a game against the Baltimore Orioles, Tsitouris had an adventurous top half of the sixth frame, surrendering two hits and a stolen base, but emerged unscathed when Oriole baserunners Joe Durham and Dick Williams were both thrown out at home plate. Then, in Detroit's half of the sixth inning, the Tigers scored two runs on a home run by Charlie Maxwell and an RBI double by J. W. Porter. Tsitouris pitched 1 2/3 innings that day and gave up one earned run, three hits and two bases on balls, but ended up getting credit for a 2–1 victory. During that offseason, he was part of a 13-player trade that sent, among others, Billy Martin to the Tigers from the Kansas City Athletics.

Tsitouris had trials with the Athletics in both 1958 and 1959. He appeared in 14 games and 33 innings pitched in 1960. On May 4 of that year, Tsitouris' jaw was broken when he was hit by a line drive in batting practice. After the 1960 season, Tsitouris was traded to the Cincinnati Reds along with John Briggs for left-handed pitcher Joe Nuxhall. He spent almost two full seasons in minor league baseball before getting his chance with Cincinnati in September 1962. Tsitouris made the most of it, giving up only two earned runs in 21⅓ innings and hurling a complete game, five-hit shutout against the Philadelphia Phillies on September 30.

For the next three seasons, Tsitouris was a full-time member of the Reds' pitching staff, winning 12 (1963), nine (1964), and six (1965) games, mostly as a starting pitcher. On September 21, 1964, he shut out the Phillies 1–0 on six hits at Connie Mack Stadium, starting the ten-game Philadelphia losing streak that knocked the Phillies out of first place. However, with his effectiveness diminishing year-by-year, Tsitouris was sent to the Triple-A Buffalo Bisons in 1966 and, despite brief trials with Cincinnati in 1967–68, spent the rest of his career in the minors.

Tsitouris' Major League record included 149 games pitched, 34 wins, 18 complete games, five shutouts, three saves and 432 strikeouts in 663 innings. He surrendered 653 hits and 260 bases on balls.

Tsitouris died in Monroe on October 22, 2015.
