= 1964 St. Louis Cardinals season =

Major League Baseball season

1964 St. Louis Cardinals
- World Series champions National League champions
- League: National League
- Ballpark: Busch Stadium I
- City: St. Louis, Missouri
- Record: 93–69 (.574)
- League place: 1st
- Owners: August "Gussie" Busch
- General managers: Bing Devine, Bob Howsam
- Managers: Johnny Keane
- Television: KSD-TV
- Radio: KMOX (Harry Caray, Jack Buck, Jerry Gross)

The 1964 St. Louis Cardinals season was the team's 83rd season in St. Louis, Missouri and its 73rd season in the National League. The Cardinals went 93–69 during the season and finished first in the National League, edging the co-runners-up Cincinnati Reds and Philadelphia Phillies by one game each on the last day of the regular-season to claim their first NL pennant since 1946. They went on to win the World Series in 7 games over the New York Yankees. This is the first season that the team wore their now famous red cap (but only for home games, beginning the next season, the team would make the red cap permanent for both home and away games).

== Offseason ==
- October 1, 1963: Ken MacKenzie was traded by the Cardinals to the San Francisco Giants for Jimmie Coker.
- December 6, 1963: Carl Sawatski was released by the Cardinals.

== Regular season ==
=== Exit Musial, enter Brock ===
The 1963 team went 93–69. It was the best record for St. Louis since the 1949 team won 96 games. The Cardinals finished six games behind the Los Angeles Dodgers.

1964 saw the Cardinals without the best hitter in franchise history. Stan Musial, whose 3,630 career hits were second on the all-time list and remain fourth today, retired after the 1963 season, at the age of 42, after 22 years in St. Louis. His absence left a hole in the Cardinal lineup and in left field, and as the early weeks of the 1964 season passed, St. Louis hovered at the.500 mark. Cardinals GM Bing Devine, worried about both the team and his own job security, looked for a deal to make before the June 15 trading deadline. He consulted with manager Johnny Keane and they decided that the team needed more speed. Keane and Devine focused on Lou Brock, an outfielder with the Chicago Cubs that the Cardinals had scouted years before and who had struggled since coming to the big leagues.

In June, with the trading deadline near and the Cardinals still around.500, Devine made the call to the Cubs and the deal was done. On June 15, St. Louis traded star pitcher Ernie Broglio, who went 18–8 in 1963 and was having another good year in 1964, to Chicago as part of a six-player deal for Brock. Many people thought the Cubs had gotten the better of the deal, including Chicago sportswriters and many Cardinal players. However, Broglio would have a mediocre half-season for the Cubs and then two more ineffective, injury-riddled years in 1965 and 1966 before disappearing from the big leagues forever. Brock hit.348 for the 1964 Cardinals, and as a Cardinal went on to break the all-time record for stolen bases (since broken by Rickey Henderson), amass over 3000 base hits, and go into the Baseball Hall of Fame in 1985.

=== Busch fires Devine ===
For most of the 1964 season, the Philadelphia Phillies looked like the team to beat. Philadelphia spent almost the entire first half in first or second place, and in July moved in first place seemingly to stay. The Cardinals, on the other hand, spent much of the season mired in the middle of the pack, and sometimes close to the bottom. As late as June 17, the Cardinals were eighth in a ten-team league, although they were only six back of the lead. Lou Brock joined the team and immediately began to hit but St. Louis still could not dent Philadelphia's lead. The Cardinals called up prized prospect Mike Shannon in early July, and still they stagnated. They were seventh as late as July 24. One problem was first baseman Bill White; the Cardinal slugger, one of the few power hitters on the team, was bothered by a sore shoulder and struggling badly.

On August 16, with the Cardinals at 61–54 and 9 1/2 games out of first place, an impatient Gussie Busch fired general manager Bing Devine. Devine had been GM of the Cardinals since 1957, but would not be around to see how the team he had built would finish. Busch considered firing Keane as well, but held back out of reluctance to further disrupt the team by firing both the manager and GM during the season. Shortly thereafter, however, Busch met with Leo Durocher and made him a verbal offer to manage the Cardinals in 1965. Word soon got out that Keane was a lame duck.

On August 23, the Cardinals fell 11 games behind Philadelphia, tied for the farthest back they'd been all year, although they'd actually improved to fourth place in the overall standings. The Cardinals reeled off a six-game winning streak immediately after falling 11 back and continued to play well in September, but the Phillies seemed to be too far ahead to catch. On September 20, the Cardinals were tied with Cincinnati for second place, 6 1/2 games behind Philadelphia. A Sports Illustrated article described the Cardinal surge as "far too late".

=== The "Phillie Phold" and Cardinal comeback ===
Injuries accumulated for the first-place Phillies as the season wore on. Slugger Frank Thomas broke his thumb. Starting pitcher Ray Culp hurt his elbow and had to go to the bullpen. Starting pitcher Art Mahaffey was slumping badly. Starting pitcher Dennis Bennett was plagued by tendinitis. Philly manager Gene Mauch, in a move that has remained controversial ever since, reacted to his rotation's problems by using star pitchers Jim Bunning and Chris Short on less than normal rest six times down the stretch. Philadelphia lost all six of those games.

Still the Phillies held on to their lead. On September 20, Philadelphia was 90–60 and led the National League by 6 1/2 games with only twelve games to go. A pennant seemed assured. The Phillies even started taking applications for World Series tickets. Then came the infamous "Phillie Phold". The Phold started on September 21, when Philadelphia lost 1–0 to Cincinnati with the only run scoring on a steal of home. The Phils were swept in three games by Cincinnati, who crept to within 3 1/2 games of first place. Then they were swept in four games by Milwaukee. On the 25th the Braves beat Philly in 12 innings. On the 26th they beat Philly by scoring three in the top of the ninth. On the 27th Milwaukee beat the Phils 14–8, extending their losing streak to seven games and dropping them out of first place for the first time in two months. Philadelphia was one game behind Cincinnati, while the Cardinals, who'd gone 6–1 during Philadelphia's streak, were in third place, 1.5 games back. The Phillies were feeling the pressure and making mistakes on the bases; in one fifteen-game stretch, 10 Phillies were thrown out trying to take an extra base.

St. Louis and Philadelphia met for a crucial three-game series starting in St. Louis on September 28. The Cardinals won the first game 5–1, vaulting past Philly into second place, one game behind the idle Reds, with the Phils 1.5 games back. On the 29th the Cards beat the Phils 4–2 behind a strong start from Sadecki, and Cincinnati lost to visiting Pittsburgh. The Cardinals were in first place for the first time all year, tied with the Reds, with Philly 1.5 games back. On the 30th the Cardinals beat the Phillies again, 8–5, with Curt Simmons beating Bunning. Cincinnati lost to Pittsburgh at home again, and the Cardinals had sole possession of first place. Philadelphia had lost ten in a row and the Cardinals had won eight in a row.

The Cardinals lost 1–0 on October 2 at home to the terrible Mets while the Phillies beat the Reds in Cincinnati to finally snap their losing streak. On the 3rd the Cardinals lost again to the Mets while the Phillies and Reds remained idle. St. Louis and Cincinnati were tied for first place with 92–69 records, while Philadelphia was one game behind at 91–70. On the last day of the season, October 4, the Phillies beat the Reds at Cincinnati again, but the Cardinals beat the visiting Mets 11–5 to win the pennant by one game, with a 93–69 record; if the Cardinals had lost that game, the regular schedule would have ended in a 3-way tie for the pennant. The "Phold" is remembered as one of the worst late-season collapses in baseball history. The Cardinals, having won their first pennant since 1946, would go on to face the mighty Yankees in the World Series.

== Season standings ==
National League
Team	W	L	Pct.	GB	Home	Road
St. Louis Cardinals	93	69	.574	—	48‍–‍33	45‍–‍36
Philadelphia Phillies	92	70	.568	1	46‍–‍35	46‍–‍35
Cincinnati Reds	92	70	.568	1	47‍–‍34	45‍–‍36
San Francisco Giants	90	72	.556	3	44‍–‍37	46‍–‍35
Milwaukee Braves	88	74	.543	5	45‍–‍36	43‍–‍38
Pittsburgh Pirates	80	82	.494	13	42‍–‍39	38‍–‍43
Los Angeles Dodgers	80	82	.494	13	41‍–‍40	39‍–‍42
Chicago Cubs	76	86	.469	17	40‍–‍41	36‍–‍45
Houston Colt .45s	66	96	.407	27	41‍–‍40	25‍–‍56
New York Mets	53	109	.327	40	33‍–‍48	20‍–‍61

=== Record vs. opponents ===
1964 National League record Sources:
Team	CHC	CIN	HOU	LAD	MIL	NYM	PHI	PIT	SF	STL
Chicago	—	6–12	11–7	10–8	8–10	11–7	6–12	9–9	9–9	6–12
Cincinnati	12–6	—	12–6	14–4–1	9–9	11–7	9–9	8–10	7–11	10–8
Houston	7–11	6–12	—	7–11	12–6	9–9	5–13	5–13	7–11	8–10
Los Angeles	8–10	4–14–1	11–7	—	8–10	15–3–1	8–10	10–8	6–12	10–8
Milwaukee	10–8	9–9	6–12	10–8	—	14–4	10–8	12–6	9–9	8–10
New York	7–11	7–11	9–9	3–15–1	4–14	—	3–15	6–12	7–11	7–11
Philadelphia	12–6	9–9	13–5	10–8	8–10	15–3	—	10–8	10–8	5–13
Pittsburgh	9–9	10–8	13–5	8–10	6–12	12–6	8–10	—	8–10	6–12
San Francisco	9–9	11–7	11–7	12–6	9–9	11–7	8–10	10–8	—	9–9
St. Louis	12–6	8–10	10–8	8–10	10–8	11–7	13–5	12–6	9–9	—

== Notable transactions ==
- April 9, 1964: Gary Kolb and Jimmie Coker were traded by the Cardinals to the Milwaukee Braves for Bob Uecker.
- May 26, 1964: Walt Williams was selected off waivers by the Cardinals from the Houston Colt .45's.
- June 15, 1964: Ernie Broglio, Doug Clemens and Bobby Shantz were traded by the Cardinals to the Chicago Cubs for Lou Brock, Jack Spring, and Paul Toth.
- September 10, 1964: Mike Torrez was signed as an amateur free agent by the Cardinals.

== Roster ==
1964 St. Louis Cardinals
Roster
Pitchers: 43 Dave Bakenhaster; 32 Ernie Broglio; 33 Lew Burdette; 41 Roger Craig; 35 Mike Cuellar; 29 Dave Dowling; 30 Harry Fanok; 45 Bob Gibson; 40 Glen Hobbie; 47 Bob Humphreys; 22 Gordie Richardson; 37 Ray Sadecki; 33 Barney Schultz; 34 Bobby Shantz; 31 Curt Simmons; 22 Jack Spring; 39 Ron Taylor; 44 Ray Washburn	Catchers: 15 Tim McCarver; 9 Bob Uecker; Infielders: 14 Ken Boyer; 11 Jerry Buchek; 16 Phil Gagliano; 24 Dick Groat; 25 Julián Javier; 27 Dal Maxvill; 12 Bill White	Outfielders: 20 Lou Brock; 22 Doug Clemens; 21 Curt Flood; 23 Charlie James; 28 Johnny Lewis; 10 Jeoff Long; 18 Mike Shannon; 19 Bob Skinner; 17 Carl Warwick; Other batters: 10 Joe Morgan; 26 Ed Spiezio	Manager: 5 Johnny Keane; Coaches: 8 Vern Benson; 4 Howie Pollet; 2 Red Schoendienst; 3 Joe Schultz

== Game log ==
Past games legend
Cardinals Win (#bfb)	Cardinals Loss (#fbb)	Game postponed (#bbb)	All-Star Game (#bbcaff)	Clinched Pennant (#039)
Bold denotes a Cardinals pitcher

1964 St. Louis Cardinals Game Log (93–69)
April: (8–6)

#	Date	Opponent	Score	Win	Loss	Save	Attendance	Record
1	April 14	@ Dodgers	0–4	Koufax (1–0)	**Broglio** (0–1)		50,451	0–1
2	April 15	@ Dodgers	6–2	**Gibson** (1–0)	Drysdale (0–1)		28,025	1–1
3	April 16	@ Giants	2–0	**Simmons** (1–0)	Hendley (0–1)		9,875	2–1
4	April 17	@ Giants	4–5 (10)	Shaw (1–0)	**Shantz** (0–1)		19,524	2–2
5	April 18	@ Giants	3–2	**Broglio** (1–1)	Bolin (0–1)		23,483	3–2
6	April 19	@ Colt .45s	6–1	**Gibson** (2–0)	Nottebart (0–1)		12,913	4–2
7	April 20	@ Colt .45s	1–7	Farrell (1–0)	**Sadecki** (0–1)		7,441	4–3
8	April 22	Dodgers	7–6	**Simmons** (2–0)	Koufax (1–2)	**Craig** (1)	31,410	5–3
9	April 23	Dodgers	5–7	Perranoski (1–0)	**Taylor** (0–1)		10,276	5–4
10	April 24	Colt .45s	3–2 (11)	**Burdette** (1–0)	Woodeshick (0–1)		6,789	6–4
11	April 25	Colt .45s	2–4	Farrell (2–0)	**Shantz** (0–2)	Woodeshick (2)	11,796	6–5
12	April 26	Colt .45s	4–6	Owens (1–1)	**Simmons** (2–1)	Woodeshick (3)	9,700	6–6
13	April 28	Mets	8–0	**Broglio** (2–1)	Jackson (1–3)		3,471	7–6
14	April 29	Mets	4–3 (11)	**Shantz** (1–2)	Bearnarth (0–3)		3,844	8–6

May: (17–14)

#	Date	Opponent	Score	Win	Loss	Save	Attendance	Record
15	May 1	Pirates	6–2	**Craig** (1–0)	Law (0–1)		14,701	9–6
16	May 2	Pirates	4–5	Sisk (1–1)	**Simmons** (2–2)	Bork (1)	12,534	9–7
17	May 3	Pirates	8–12	Schwall (2–1)	**Sadecki** (0–2)	Face (2)	11,051	9–8
18	May 4	Phillies	9–2	**Craig** (2–0)	Dennis Bennett (2–2)		7,437	10–8
19	May 5	Phillies	2–1	**Washburn** (1–0)	Bunning (3–1)	**Taylor** (1)	10,443	11–8
20	May 6	@ Pirates	0–1	Friend (3–0)	**Sadecki** (0–3)		8,659	11–9
21	May 7	@ Pirates	4–2	**Simmons** (3–2)	Veale (1–3)	**Craig** (2)	7,219	12–9
22	May 8	@ Mets	4–5	Bearnarth (1–3)	**Shantz** (1–3)		32,386	12–10
23	May 9	@ Mets	5–1	**Gibson** (3–0)	Cisco (0–2)		16,757	13–10
24	May 10	@ Mets	1–4	Stallard (2–4)	**Craig** (2–1)		–	13–11
25	May 10	@ Mets	10–1	**Washburn** (2–0)	Hinsley (0–1)	**Taylor** (2)	30,776	14–11
26	May 11	@ Phillies	3–2	**Sadecki** (1–3)	Culp (1–3)		11,200	15–11
27	May 12	@ Phillies	4–2	**Simmons** (4–2)	Mahaffey (2–2)	**Craig** (3)	14,412	16–11
—	May 13	@ Phillies	Postponed (rain); Makeup: September 10					
28	May 14	@ Phillies	2–3	Bunning (4–1)	**Broglio** (2–2)	Roebuck (4)	16,626	16–12
29	May 15	Braves	10–6	**Craig** (3–1)	Tiefenauer (1–3)		22,400	17–12
30	May 16	Braves	6–5	**Sadecki** (2–3)	Sadowski (2–3)	**Taylor** (3)	13,564	18–12
31	May 17	Braves	7–3	**Simmons** (5–2)	Fischer (4–2)		–	19–12
32	May 17	Braves	2–4	Cloninger (3–2)	**Washburn** (2–1)		28,594	19–13
33	May 19	Cubs	4–7	Ellsworth (3–4)	**Broglio** (2–3)		8,541	19–14
34	May 20	Cubs	1–0	**Gibson** (4–0)	Jackson (5–3)		8,612	20–14
35	May 21	Cubs	10–3	**Sadecki** (3–3)	Hobbie (0–2)		7,877	21–14
36	May 22	@ Braves	6–1	**Simmons** (6–2)	Cloninger (3–3)		20,489	22–14
37	May 23	@ Braves	4–8	Hoeft (1–0)	**Craig** (3–2)		10,567	22–15
38	May 24	@ Braves	4–7	Spahn (4–3)	**Sadecki** (3–4)	Sadowski (1)	–	22–16
39	May 24	@ Braves	0–10	Lemaster (5–2)	**Broglio** (2–4)		26,084	22–17
—	May 26	Giants	Postponed (rain); Makeup: June 18					
40	May 27	Giants	1–2	Marichal (7–1)	**Gibson** (4–1)		14,786	22–18
41	May 28	Giants	1–2	Hendley (4–3)	**Simmons** (6–3)	Bolin (1)	14,092	22–19
42	May 29	Reds	4–3	**Sadecki** (4–4)	O'Toole (3–2)		10,219	23–19
43	May 30	Reds	7–1	**Broglio** (3–4)	Ellis (3–2)		11,051	24–19
44	May 31	Reds	0–6	Purkey (3–3)	**Washburn** (2–2)		–	24–20
45	May 31	Reds	2–1	**Gibson** (5–1)	Tsitouris (1–3)		20,240	25–20

June: (11–18)

#	Date	Opponent	Score	Win	Loss	Save	Attendance	Record
46	June 2	@ Cubs	2–5	Jackson (7–4)	**Simmons** (6–4)		5,129	25–21
47	June 3	@ Cubs	7–5	**Sadecki** (5–4)	Buhl (5–3)	**Craig** (4)	6,718	26–21
48	June 4	@ Cubs	1–2	Ellsworth (7–4)	**Gibson** (5–2)		8,019	26–22
49	June 5	@ Reds	4–5	Jay (2–2)	**Craig** (3–3)		10,692	26–23
50	June 6	@ Reds	0–3	Tsitouris (2–3)	**Washburn** (2–3)	Ellis (1)	17,386	26–24
51	June 7	@ Reds	6–11	Nuxhall (5–3)	**Simmons** (6–5)	Jay (1)	12,925	26–25
—	June 8	@ Giants	Postponed (rain); Makeup: June 10					
52	June 9	@ Giants	1–0	**Sadecki** (6–4)	Marichal (8–2)		14,348	27–25
53	June 10	@ Giants	0–3	Hendley (5–4)	**Gibson** (5–3)	Perry (1)	–	27–26
54	June 10	@ Giants	2–1	**Hobbie** (1–3)	Herbel (3–2)		16,684	28–26
55	June 11	@ Dodgers	0–5	Drysdale (8–5)	**Washburn** (2–4)		29,272	28–27
56	June 12	@ Dodgers	0–3	Koufax (8–4)	**Broglio** (3–5)		44,476	28–28
57	June 13	@ Dodgers	2–3	Moeller (4–5)	**Sadecki** (6–5)	Perranoski (4)	29,199	28–29
58	June 14	@ Colt .45s	1–4	Farrell (10–1)	**Gibson** (5–4)		15,341	28–30
59	June 15	@ Colt .45s	3–9	Owens (2–4)	**Hobbie** (1–4)		8,584	28–31
60	June 16	@ Colt .45s	7–1	**Simmons** (7–5)	Bruce (6–3)		12,383	29–31
61	June 17	@ Colt .45s	2–1	**Washburn** (3–4)	Johnson (5–6)	**Taylor** (4)	10,777	30–31
62	June 18	Giants	7–6	**Sadecki** (7–5)	Marichal (8–3)	**Taylor** (5)	14,876	31–31
63	June 19	Giants	3–1	**Gibson** (6–4)	Herbel (4–3)	**Taylor** (6)	24,533	32–31
64	June 20	Giants	3–14	Hendley (6–4)	**Hobbie** (1–5)	Duffalo (1)	20,646	32–32
65	June 21	Giants	3–7	Sanford (5–7)	**Simmons** (7–6)	Perry (2)	25,848	32–33
66	June 23	Colt .45s	5–4	**Taylor** (1–1)	Larsen (0–2)	**Cuellar** (1)	9,679	33–33
67	June 24	Colt. 45s	5–7	Owens (3–4)	**Sadecki** (7–6)	Woodeshick (15)	8,621	33–34
68	June 25	Colt .45s	4–2	**Craig** (4–3)	Bruce (7–4)	**Hobbie** (1)	6,842	34–34
69	June 26	Phillies	5–6	Roebuck (2–2)	**Taylor** (1–2)		18,484	34–35
70	June 27	Phillies	9–4	**Simmons** (8–6)	Wise (1–1)		12,388	35–35
71	June 28	Phillies	0–5	Short (6–4)	**Cuellar** (0–1)		–	35–36
72	June 28	Phillies	8–2	**Sadecki** (8–6)	Culp (4–6)		27,805	36–36
73	June 29	Braves	4–7	Tiefenauer (3–4)	**Gibson** (6–5)		11,336	36–37
74	June 30	Braves	4–5	Sadowski (3–6)	**Craig** (4–4)	Tiefenauer (6)	7,484	36–38

July: (17–11)

#	Date	Opponent	Score	Win	Loss	Save	Attendance	Record
75	July 1	@ Braves	6–1	**Simmons** (9–6)	Fischer (6–5)		13,608	37–38
76	July 2	@ Braves	4–3	**Sadecki** (9–6)	Spahn (5–8)	**Humphreys** (1)	6,863	38–38
77	July 3	@ Reds	1–4	Tsitouris (5–5)	**Gibson** (6–6)		11,975	38–39
78	July 4	@ Reds	2–3	O'Toole (6–4)	**Cuellar** (0–2)	McCool (3)	21,320	38–40
79	July 5	@ Reds	3–1	**Craig** (5–4)	Jay (4–5)		11,854	39–40
**35th All-Star Game in Queens, New York City, New York**
80	July 9	@ Mets	3–4	Jackson (5–10)	**Simmons** (9–7)		13,804	39–41
81	July 10	@ Mets	3–1	**Gibson** (7–6)	Fisher (5–8)		33,634	40–41
82	July 11	@ Mets	11–4	**Sadecki** (10–6)	Stallard (5–11)	**Taylor** (7)	19,475	41–41
—	July 12	@ Pirates	Postponed (rain); Makeup: July 13					
—	July 12	@ Pirates	Postponed (rain); Makeup: September 24					
83	July 13	@ Pirates	5–4 (12)	**Taylor** (2–2)	Sisk (1–4)		–	42–41
84	July 13	@ Pirates	12–5	**Cuellar** (1–2)	Law (7–8)	**Washburn** (1)	14,773	43–41
85	July 14	Dodgers	8–7	**Taylor** (3–2)	Perranoski (4–5)		24,817	44–41
86	July 15	Dodgers	3–13	L. Miller (1–1)	**Gibson** (7–7)	Perranoski (7)	17,304	44–42
87	July 16	Dodgers	2–10	Moeller (5–7)	**Sadecki** (10–7)	B. Miller (3)	15,780	44–43
88	July 17	Mets	9–8	**Cuellar** (2–2)	Stallard (5–13)	**Gibson** (1)	10,759	45–43
89	July 18	Mets	15–7	**Taylor** (4–2)	Wakefield (2–3)	**Sadecki** (1)	9,424	46–43
90	July 19	Mets	2–3	Fisher (6–9)	**Simmons** (9–8)		–	46–44
91	July 19	Mets	7–6	**Gibson** (8–7)	Hunter (0–1)		18,377	47–44
92	July 21	Pirates	4–8	Gibbon (7–3)	**Sadecki** (10–8)	Bork (2)	11,805	47–45
93	July 22	Pirates	2–13	Veale (11–6)	**Craig** (5–5)		11,089	47–46
94	July 23	Pirates	5–8	Blass (4–6)	**Cuellar** (2–3)	Face (3)	7,893	47–47
95	July 24	@ Phillies	1–9	Short (9–5)	**Gibson** (8–8)		22,628	47–48
96	July 25	@ Phillies	10–9	**Simmons** (10–8)	Dennis Bennett (9–8)	**Cuellar** (2)	10,948	48–48
97	July 26	@ Phillies	6–1	**Richardson** (1–0)	Boozer (1–1)		–	49–48
98	July 26	@ Phillies	4–1	**Sadecki** (11–8)	Mahaffey (9–5)		28,118	50–48
99	July 28	@ Cubs	12–7 (10)	**Taylor** (5–2)	Jackson (13–9)	**Cuellar** (3)	16,052	51–48
100	July 29	@ Cubs	9–1	**Simmons** (11–8)	L. Burdette (7–3)		16,781	52–48
101	July 30	@ Cubs	5–2	**Sadecki** (12–8)	Ellsworth (12–12)	**Craig** (5)	11,173	53–48
102	July 31	Reds	6–7	Tsitouris (7–7)	**Richardson** (1–1)	Purkey (1)	22,136	53–49

August: (18–10)

#	Date	Opponent	Score	Win	Loss	Save	Attendance	Record
103	August 1	Reds	5–6	Jay (6–8)	**Gibson** (8–9)	Ellis (6)	13,057	53–50
104	August 2	Reds	5–4	**Cuellar** (3–3)	McCool (3–2)	**Taylor** (8)	14,010	54–50
105	August 4	Cubs	0–4	L. Burdette (8–4)	**Sadecki** (12–9)		12,723	54–51
106	August 5	Cubs	4–2	**Richardson** (2–1)	Buhl (12–8)	**Humphreys** (2)	11,614	55–51
107	August 6	Cubs	5–3	**Gibson** (9–9)	Ellsworth (12–13)	**Schultz** (1)	8,258	56–51
108	August 7	Colt .45s	4–0	**Simmons** (12–8)	Brown (2–10)		14,344	57–51
109	August 8	Colt .45s	3–4	Nottebart (5–8)	**Taylor** (5–3)	Owens (3)	14,842	57–52
110	August 9	Colt .45s	8–2	**Sadecki** (13–9)	Bruce (11–7)		19,658	58–52
111	August 10	Giants	2–1	**Gibson** (10–9)	Herbel (10–7)	**Schultz** (2)	18,779	59–52
112	August 11	Giants	3–6	Hendley (10–7)	**Simmons** (12–9)	Pierce (4)	21,075	59–53
113	August 12	Giants	6–4	**Craig** (6–5)	Shaw (7–5)	**Schultz** (3)	17,676	60–53
114	August 14	@ Dodgers	4–3	**Sadecki** (14–9)	Drysdale (13–12)	**Cuellar** (4)	33,835	61–53
115	August 15	@ Dodgers	3–4	Moeller (7–11)	**Gibson** (10–10)	Perranoski (9)	22,218	61–54
116	August 16	@ Dodgers	0–3	Koufax (19–5)	**Richardson** (2–2)		–	61–55
117	August 16	@ Dodgers	4–0	**Simmons** (13–9)	L. Miller (2–4)		38,072	62–55
118	August 17	@ Colt .45s	3–1	**Cuellar** (4–3)	Brown (2–12)	**Schultz** (4)	8,053	63–55
119	August 18	@ Colt .45s	5–2	**Sadecki** (15–9)	Larsen (1–6)	**Schultz** (5)	8,617	64–55
120	August 19	@ Colt .45s	7–8 (10)	Owens (6–7)	**Schultz** (0–1)		8,149	64–56
121	August 21	@ Giants	6–5	**Taylor** (6–3)	Duffalo (2–1)	**Schultz** (6)	19,644	65–56
122	August 22	@ Giants	2–4	Bolin (5–5)	**Craig** (6–6)		22,910	65–57
123	August 23	@ Giants	2–3 (10)	O'Dell (6–6)	**Schultz** (0–2)		28,712	65–58
124	August 24	Pirates	5–1	**Gibson** (11–10)	Friend (10–14)		10,881	66–58
125	August 25	Pirates	7–6 (13)	**Taylor** (7–3)	McBean (7–2)		8,664	67–58
126	August 26	Pirates	4–2	**Cuellar** (5–3)	Bork (2–1)		9,662	68–58
127	August 28	Dodgers	5–3	**Sadecki** (16–9)	Ortega (6–6)		20,180	69–58
128	August 29	Dodgers	4–1	**Gibson** (12–10)	Reed (1–3)		20,001	70–58
129	August 30	Dodgers	5–1	**Simmons** (14–9)	L. Miller (2–6)		24,766	71–58
130	August 31	Dodgers	3–12	Drysdale (15–13)	**Cuellar** (5–4)		16,387	71–59

September: (21–8)

#	Date	Opponent	Score	Win	Loss	Save	Attendance	Record
131	September 1	Braves	5–4	**Taylor** (8–3)	Lemaster (13–10)		8,079	72–59
132	September 2	Braves	6–2	**Gibson** (13–10)	Fischer (10–9)		8,369	73–59
133	September 3	Braves	0–7	Blasingame (4–4)	**Craig** (6–7)		8,221	73–60
134	September 4	Cubs	8–5	**Richardson** (3–2)	Elston (2–5)		10,220	74–60
135	September 5	Cubs	5–8	Jackson (18–10)	**Cuellar** (5–5)	McDaniel (11)	12,185	74–61
136	September 6	Cubs	5–4 (11)	**Humphreys** (1–0)	McDaniel (1–7)		16,161	75–61
137	September 7	Reds	3–2	**Gibson** (14–10)	Henry (2–2)		–	76–61
138	September 7	Reds	3–2	**Schultz** (1–2)	Nuxhall (8–8)		22,187	77–61
139	September 9	@ Phillies	10–5 (11)	**Humphreys** (2–0)	Baldschun (6–7)		25,339	78–61
140	September 10	@ Phillies	0–3	Short (16–7)	**Sadecki** (16–10)		14,552	78–62
141	September 11	@ Cubs	5–0	**Gibson** (15–10)	Broglio (7–12)		2,240	79–62
142	September 12	@ Cubs	2–3	Buhl (13–11)	**Craig** (6–8)		8,330	79–63
143	September 13	@ Cubs	15–2	**Simmons** (15–9)	Ellsworth (14–15)	**Washburn** (2)	11,606	80–63
—	September 14	@ Braves	Postponed (rain); Makeup: September 15					
144	September 15	@ Braves	11–6	**Sadecki** (17–10)	Cloninger (16–13)	**Schultz** (7)	–	81–63
145	September 15	@ Braves	3–1	**Gibson** (16–10)	Blasingame (5–5)		5,843	82–63
146	September 16	@ Braves	2–3	Lemaster (15–11)	**Taylor** (8–4)	Tiefenauer (12)	3,019	82–64
—	September 18	@ Reds	Postponed (rain); Makeup: September 19					
147	September 19	@ Reds	5–7	Ellis (9–3)	**Gibson** (16–11)		–	82–65
148	September 19	@ Reds	2–0	**Sadecki** (18–10)	McCool (5–3)	**Schultz** (8)	13,221	83–65
149	September 20	@ Reds	6–9	Ellis (10–3)	**Schultz** (1–3)		11,544	83–66
150	September 22	@ Mets	2–1	**Simmons** (16–9)	Stallard (10–19)		10,443	84–66
151	September 23	@ Mets	1–2	Cisco (6–17)	**Craig** (6–9)	Hunter (5)	3,941	84–67
152	September 24	@ Pirates	4–2	**Gibson** (17–11)	Wood (0–1)		–	85–67
153	September 24	@ Pirates	4–0	**Sadecki** (19–10)	Butters (1–2)		2,846	86–67
154	September 25	@ Pirates	5–3	**Richardson** (4–2)	Cardwell (1–1)	**Schultz** (9)	3,694	87–67
155	September 26	@ Pirates	6–3	**Simmons** (17–9)	Veale (18–12)	**Schultz** (10)	4,085	88–67
156	September 27	@ Pirates	5–0	**Craig** (7–9)	Law (12–13)	**Schultz** (11)	19,287	89–67
157	September 28	Phillies	5–1	**Gibson** (18–11)	Short (17–9)	**Schultz** (12)	24,146	90–67
158	September 29	Phillies	4–2	**Sadecki** (20–10)	Dennis Bennett (12–14)	**Schultz** (13)	27,433	91–67
159	September 30	Phillies	8–5	**Simmons** (18–9)	Bunning (18–8)	**Richardson** (1)	29,920	92–67

October: (1–2)

#	Date	Opponent	Score	Win	Loss	Save	Attendance	Record
160	October 2	Mets	0–1	Jackson (11–16)	**Gibson** (18–12)		19,019	92–68
161	October 3	Mets	5–15	Parsons (1–2)	**Sadecki** (20–11)		18,650	92–69
162	October 4	Mets	11–5	**Gibson** (19–12)	Cisco (6–19)	**Schultz** (14)	30,146	93–69

== Player stats ==
=== Batting ===
==== Starters by position ====
Note: Pos = Position; G = Games played; AB = At bats; H = Hits; Avg. = Batting average; HR = Home runs; RBI = Runs batted in

Pos	Player	G	AB	H	Avg.	HR	RBI
C	Tim McCarver	143	465	134	.288	9	52
1B	Bill White	160	631	191	.303	21	102
2B	Julián Javier	155	535	129	.241	12	65
3B	Ken Boyer	162	628	185	.295	24	119
SS	Dick Groat	161	636	186	.292	1	70
LF	Lou Brock	103	419	146	.348	12	44
CF	Curt Flood	162	679	211	.311	5	46
RF	Mike Shannon	88	253	66	.261	9	43

==== Other batters ====
Note: G = Games played; AB = At bats; H = Hits; Avg. = Batting average; HR = Home runs; RBI = Runs batted in

Player	G	AB	H	Avg.	HR	RBI
Charlie James	88	233	52	.223	5	17
Carl Warwick	88	158	41	.259	3	15
Bob Skinner	55	118	32	.271	1	16
Bob Uecker	40	106	21	.198	1	6
Johnny Lewis	40	94	22	.234	2	7
Doug Clemens	33	78	16	.205	1	9
Phil Gagliano	40	58	15	.259	1	9
Jeoff Long	28	43	10	.233	1	4
Jerry Buchek	35	30	6	.200	0	1
Dal Maxvill	37	26	6	.231	0	4
Ed Spiezio	12	12	4	.333	0	0
Joe Morgan	3	3	0	.000	0	0

=== Pitching ===
==== Starting pitchers ====
Note: G = Games pitched; IP = Innings pitched; W = Wins; L = Losses; ERA = Earned run average; SO = Strikeouts

Player	G	IP	W	L	ERA	SO
Bob Gibson	40	287.1	19	12	3.01	245
Curt Simmons	34	244.0	18	9	3.43	104
Ray Sadecki	37	220.0	20	11	3.68	119
Ernie Broglio	11	69.1	3	5	3.50	36

==== Other pitchers ====
Note: G = Games pitched; IP = Innings pitched; W = Wins; L = Losses; ERA = Earned run average; SO = Strikeouts

Player	G	IP	W	L	ERA	SO
Roger Craig	39	166.0	7	9	3.25	84
Ray Washburn	15	60.0	3	4	4.05	28
Gordie Richardson	19	47.0	4	2	2.30	28
Glen Hobbie	13	44.1	1	2	4.26	18
Bobby Shantz	16	17.1	1	3	3.12	12
Lew Burdette	8	10.0	1	0	1.80	3

==== Relief pitchers ====
Note: G = Games pitched; W = Wins; L = Losses; SV = Saves; ERA = Earned run average; SO = Strikeouts

Player	G	W	L	SV	ERA	SO
Barney Schultz	30	1	3	14	1.64	29
Ron Taylor	63	8	4	8	4.62	69
Mike Cuellar	32	5	5	4	4.50	56
Bob Humphreys	28	2	0	2	2.53	36
Harry Fanok	4	0	0	0	5.87	10
Dave Bakenhaster	2	0	0	0	6.00	0
Jack Spring	2	0	0	0	3.00	0
Dave Dowling	1	0	0	0	0.00	0

== 1964 World Series ==
Playing in their first Series in eighteen years, and one that resembled a rematch of the two franchises' first encounter in 1926, the upstart "Redbirds" took on the veteran New York Yankees, featuring Ken Boyer's younger brother Clete, also an All-Star third baseman. Ken Boyer's stunning grand slam home run in Game 4 at Yankee Stadium, along with Gibson's overpowering pitching, was a key in a 4 games to 3 win by the Cardinals – their seventh World Series championship. This marked the end of the Yankee dynasty that saw 15 pennants in 18 seasons from 1947 to 1964. The Cardinals are the only one of the original eight National League teams to hold an overall World Series edge against the Yankees, 3 Series to 2.

Before the regular season had ended, both the owners of the Cardinals and the Yankees had decided to replace their managers, Keane and Yogi Berra, after the season – regardless of outcome. When these two teams happened to meet in the World Series, this plan received a great deal of attention.

NL St. Louis Cardinals (4) vs. AL New York Yankees (3)
Game	Score	Date	Location	Attendance	Time of Game
1	Yankees – 5, Cardinals – 9	October 7	Busch Stadium	30,805	2:42
2	Yankees – 8, Cardinals – 3	October 8	Busch Stadium	30,805	2:29
3	Cardinals – 1, Yankees – 2	October 10	Yankee Stadium	67,101	2:16
4	Cardinals – 4, Yankees – 3	October 11	Yankee Stadium	66,312	2:18
5	Cardinals – 5, Yankees – 2	October 12	Yankee Stadium	65,633	2:37
6	Yankees – 8, Cardinals – 3	October 14	Busch Stadium	30,805	2:37
7	Yankees – 5, Cardinals – 7	October 15	Busch Stadium	30,346	2:40

Thirty years later, David Halberstam would chronicle the 1964 Cardinals and their World Series opponents the 1964 Yankees in the book October 1964.

== After the season ==
Gussie Busch changed his mind about Durocher and attempted to rehire his Series-winning manager, but Keane, angry at the way Busch had treated him and Devine, quit and became manager of the Yankees. Red Schoendienst took over as manager and led the team to two pennants and a championship in 1967 on his way to twelve seasons at the helm. The Sporting News named Bing Devine Baseball Executive of the Year a few months after he was fired and Keane Manager of the Year.

== Awards and honors ==
- Ken Boyer, National League MVP Award
- Bob Gibson, Babe Ruth Award
- Bob Gibson, World Series Most Valuable Player Award
- Gold Glove Awards
  - Curt Flood, outfield
  - Bobby Shantz, pitcher
  - Bill White, first base

== Farm system ==
Level	Team	League	Manager
AAA	Jacksonville Suns	International League	Harry Walker
AA	Tulsa Oilers	Texas League	Grover Resinger
A	Raleigh Cardinals	Carolina League	George Kissell
A	Winnipeg Goldeyes	Northern League	Ron Plaza
A	Rock Hill Cardinals	Western Carolinas League	Hal Smith
Rookie	SRL Cardinals	Sarasota Rookie League	Fred Koenig
