= Julián Javier =

Dominican baseball player (born 1936)

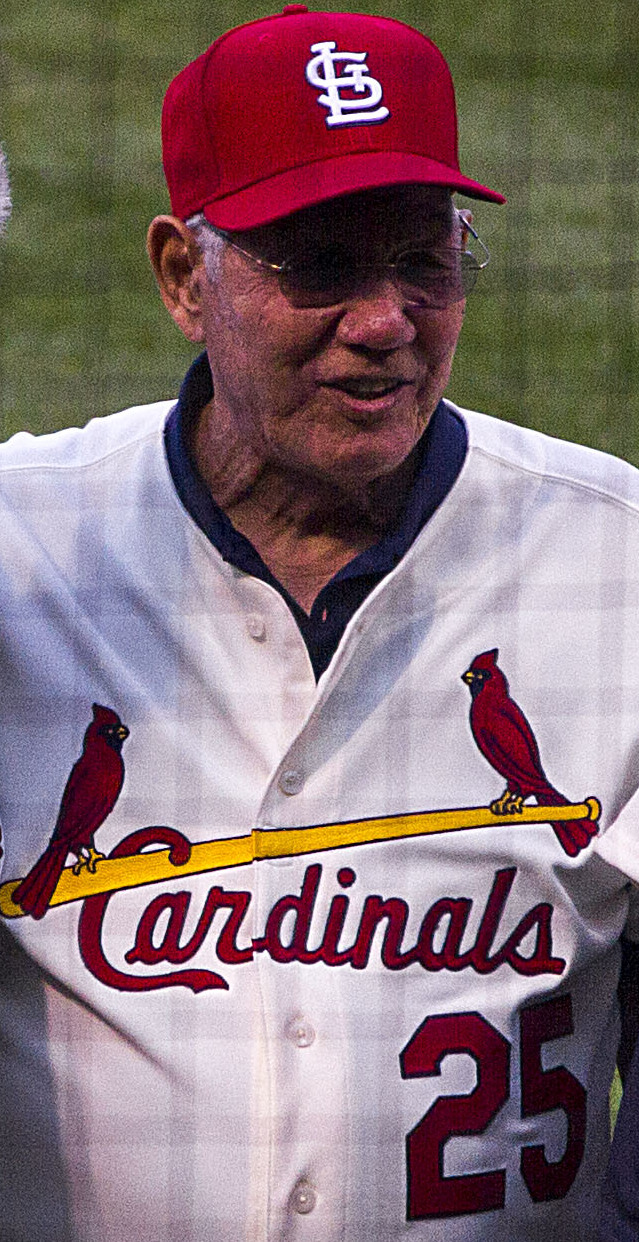
- Javier in 2017
- Second baseman
- Born: August 9, 1936 (age 90); San Francisco de Macorís, Dominican Republic
- Batted: Right Threw: Right

MLB debut
- May 28, 1960, for the St. Louis Cardinals

Last MLB appearance
- October 1, 1972, for the Cincinnati Reds

MLB statistics
- Batting average: .257
- Home runs: 78
- Runs batted in: 506
- Stats at Baseball Reference

Teams
- St. Louis Cardinals (1960–1971); Cincinnati Reds (1972)

Career highlights and awards
- 2× All-Star (1963, 1968); 2× World Series champion (1964, 1967); St. Louis Cardinals Hall of Fame
Medals
Men's baseball
Representing Dominican Republic
Pan American Games
Gold medal – first place	1955 Mexico City	Team

Manuel Julián Javier Liranzo (hoo-lee-ON HAH-vee-air; born August 9, 1936) is a Dominican former professional baseball second baseman. He played 13 seasons in Major League Baseball (MLB), primarily for the St. Louis Cardinals where he was a two-time All-Star and won two World Series in 1964 and 1967. He played his final season with the Cincinnati Reds.

A light-hitting defensive specialist, he was nicknamed "Hoolie" by his teammates, and "the Phantom" by teammate Tim McCarver for his ability to avoid baserunners sliding into second base. Javier was an integral figure in the history and development of baseball in the Dominican Republic, founding multiple baseball leagues as well as the Gigantes del Cibao of the Dominican Winter League. His son Stan Javier, also played in Major League Baseball. In 2022, Javier was inducted into the St. Louis Cardinals Hall of Fame.

== Early life ==
Javier became a well-known baseball phenomenon in his hometown of San Francisco de Macoris. As an amateur, he was a third baseman as well as a power hitter. It is legend that he has hit the longest home runs in the high school stadiums of San Francisco de Macoris to this date. He went on to represent the Dominican Republic in the 1955 Pan American Games, although he did not see much playing time, the team went on to win the first gold medal for the Dominican Republic at a Pan American Games. That team also had another future all-star major leaguer Felipe Alou.

== Trade to Cardinals ==
1967 photocard of Javier for St. Louis Cardinals

The right-handed batting Javier signed as an amateur free agent with the Pittsburgh Pirates in 1956. Coming up through the minor leagues, Javier became known as "the fastest man in baseball." He batted .250 with twenty home runs in five years in their farm system, and had emerged as one of their top prospects when he was dealt to the St. Louis Cardinals on May 27, 1960 with a pitcher to be named later for Vinegar Bend Mizell and Dick Gray. The next day, he made his major league debut starting at second base for the Cards against the San Francisco Giants.

== Emerging as an All-Star ==
Javier led the Cardinals in stolen bases every year from 1960 to 1963. His finest season was 1962. Sharing lead-off duties with Curt Flood in manager Johnny Keane's batting order, Javier stole a career-high 26 bases and scored a career-high 97 runs. Javier led an inning off with a hit or walk 61 times for a .347 on-base percentage leading off innings.

When Pirates second baseman Bill Mazeroski was unable to start the 1963 All-Star game due to injury, Javier was added to the starting line-up. Along with Bill White at first base, Dick Groat at shortstop and Ken Boyer at third, they formed an all-Cardinal starting infield for the National League All-Star team.

== World Series champion ==
After never finishing better than third in any of the first three seasons of Javier's career, the Cardinals were in a heated battle with the Los Angeles Dodgers for first place in the National League for most of the 1963 season. The Dodgers came to St. Louis a game ahead of the Cards on September 16 for a three-game set. Javier went two-for-fourteen with two errors in this crucial series. The first error came in the ninth inning of the first game, allowing the Dodgers to score the final run of their 3–1 victory. The second error occurred on a Dick Tracewski ground ball in the thirteenth inning of the final game, allowing the Dodgers to complete the three-game sweep on their way to winning the National League pennant.

Javier drove in a career-high 65 runs and dropped to the seven spot in the batting order in 1964. The 1964 Cardinals came back from eleven games out of first place on August 23 to win their first NL pennant since 1946 on the last day of the regular season by one game over the Cincinnati Reds and Philadelphia Phillies. When they faced the New York Yankees in the World Series, Javier was limited to one pinch-running appearance due to a bruised hip.

== Dominican Professional Baseball League suspension ==
During the off-season, Javier caused some controversy in the Dominican League while playing with the Aguilas Cibaenas. During the winter league play-offs in the Dominican Republic after being called out on strikes by home plate umpire Emmett Ashford. Javier struck Ashford who during his 12 years in the PCL became the best-known umpire for being " a showman, exuberant, strong, alert, loud and expressive," recalled Paul Wysard of Ashford's' days in the PCL. The incident was initiated when Javier showed his dislike to the second called strike and Javier took his time to get back in the batter's box, Ashford instructed the pitcher to pitch without Javier being in the batter's box and called him out on strike infuriating Javier who voiced his discontent and got into an argument with expletives being called by both Javier and Ashford and then Javier struck Ashford twice in the face, Ashford responded hitting Javier back with the mask. Javier was originally suspended indefinitely by the Dominican Professional Baseball League, but after Javier pleaded his case and told his side of the story it was eventually cut to three days and fifty dollars, prompting Ashford to resign from the league.

After a contract dispute and visa problems caused Javier to miss part of spring training 1965, a broken hand caused Javier to miss a month and a half of the regular season. In his absence, the Cardinals used a revolving door of second basemen that included Jerry Buchek, Phil Gagliano and Dal Maxvill. Javier was never able to regain form upon his return in August, as he batted just .195 with eight runs batted in over the rest of the season.

The World Series champions finished a disappointing 80–81 and in seventh place Red Schoendienst's first season at the helm. Each member of St. Louis' aging infield was replaced heading into the 1966 season with the exception of Javier. The team showed modest improvement, but still managed only a sixth-place finish. For his part, Javier batted just a .228 with thirty RBIs, both career lows for a full, healthy season.

== 1967 World Series ==
After two subpar seasons in a row, Javier headed into spring training 1967 battling Phil Gagliano for the starting second base job. Javier ended up winning the job and carrying the Cards to victories in their first six games, batting .435 with two home runs and eight runs scored. His batting average hovered around .300 through the middle of July, as he finished the season at .281 with 64 RBIs and a career-high fourteen home runs. He was one of four Cardinals players to finish in the top ten in National League Most Valuable Player balloting.

The Cardinals won 101 games in 1967 to cruise into a rematch of the 1946 World Series with the Boston Red Sox. In the second game at Fenway Park, Boston's Jim Lonborg came four outs away from recording the second no hitter in World Series history until Javier connected for a two-out double in the eighth. In the seventh and deciding game, Javier connected for a three-run home run off Lonborg to seal St. Louis' 7–2 win. He also had an RBI in the Cardinals' 6–0 game four victory.

He earned his second career All-Star nod when Red Schoendienst named him as a reserve on the 1968 NL team. The Cardinals won 97 games in 1968 to repeat as National League champions. They lost a seven-game World Series to the Detroit Tigers in which Javier batted .333 with three RBIs. He drove in the lone Cardinals run of their 13–1 game six loss.

== Cincinnati Reds ==
Following the 1970 season, Javier began having back tax issues with the Internal Revenue Service that threatened his availability for the 1971 season. Coupled with Javier's age (34 at the start of the season), this prompted Cardinals GM Bing Devine to trade Richie Allen to the Los Angeles Dodgers for former Rookie of the Year Ted Sizemore and minor league catcher Bob Stinson.

Javier managed to get his tax issues in order and reported to Spring training on time. He was the Cardinals' opening day second baseman due in part to an injury to Dal Maxvill that limited his availability, and had Sizemore opening the season at short. After a slow start, he was back in the Dominican for two weeks to be with his ailing younger brother, Luis. Following Luis' death, Javier returned to the Cardinals to bat .352 with two home runs and fifteen RBIs through the end of May. A dismal June (.088 batting average) prompted Schoendienst to shift Sizemore back to second and return Maxvill to short. Javier ended the season with a .259 batting average, three home runs, and 28 RBIs in ninety games.

Unhappy with a reserve role, Javier asked to be traded during Spring training 1972. The Cardinals obliged, dealing him to the Cincinnati Reds for pitcher Tony Cloninger.

With Joe Morgan at second, most of Javier's playing time with the Reds was at third base or as a pinch hitter. He batted .209 in 91 at-bats for the Reds. The "Big Red Machine" stormed into the post-season by 10.5 games over the Dodgers. Javier did not make a plate appearance in the 1972 National League Championship Series with the Pittsburgh Pirates, however, he appeared in four of the seven games of the 1972 World Series against the Oakland A's. He retired at the end of the season.

With 18 plate appearances (2-for-16) between the two, Javier holds the distinction of being the batter who faced Nolan Ryan the most times without ever striking out against the stat's all-time leader.

== Career stats ==
Seasons	Games	PA	AB	Runs	Hits	2B	3B	HR	RBI	SB	BB	SO	Avg.	OBP	TB	Fld%	PO	DP
13	1622	6197	5722	722	1469	216	55	78	506	135	314	812	.257	.296	2029	.971	3380	907

== Personal life ==
He was married to Inés Negrin, with whom he had five sons and daughters: Julieta, Julián José, Stanley, Vienna Alexandra, and Lynette. Stan is named after friend and teammate Stan Musial. After losing his wife to stomach cancer in 1997, he married Yolanda Then, his current wife. His oldest son, Manuel Julián, is an engineer in Santiago, Dominican Republic. His other son, Julián J, is an interventional cardiologist in Naples, Florida.

Javier founded the Khoury League in Dominican Republic, later changing its name to the Roberto Clemente League to honor the Pittsburgh Pirates legend. He also founded the Summer League, a professional baseball league with four teams in the cities of Santiago, Puerto Plata, La Vega and San Francisco de Macorís that played from 1975 to 1978. He also founded, with the help of his son Stan, the Gigantes del Cibao, one of the expansion teams in the Dominican Winter Baseball League (LIDOM).

Estadio Julian Javier, the stadium in Julián Javier's hometown of San Francisco de Macorís, is named after him, and is the home stadium for the Gigantes del Cibao. He was chosen the all-time second baseman for the Águilas Cibaeñas, and his number (25) retired by them in the Dominican Winter Baseball League. He was inducted into the Dominican Republic Hall of Fame in 1978, and is also a member of the Triple-A Hall of Fame in Columbus, Ohio for his remarkable performance with the Columbus Jets while playing in the Pirates' minor league system. He was inducted into the Hispanic Heritage Baseball Museum Hall of Fame in 2012.

He was named to the St. Louis Cardinals Hall of Fame in May 2022, and was inducted to the "Red jacket club" in August 2022.

== See also ==
- List of St. Louis Cardinals team records
- Players from Dominican Republic in MLB
