= Leo Burke (disambiguation) =

Leo Burke (1948–2024) was a Canadian professional wrestler.

Leo Burke may also refer to:

  - Leo Burke (baseball) (1934–2023), American utility player in Major League Baseball
  - Leo Burke (footballer) (1891–1957), Australian rules footballer
  - Raymond Leo Burke, (born 1948) Catholic cardinal
