= Spiezio =

Spiezio is a surname. Notable people with the surname include:

- Ed Spiezio (born 1941), American baseball player
- Scott Spiezio (born 1972), American baseball player
