= Dave Dowling =

American baseball player (born 1942)

- Pitcher
- Born: August 23, 1942 (age 83); Baton Rouge, Louisiana, U.S.
- Batted: Right Threw: Left

MLB debut
- October 3, 1964, for the St. Louis Cardinals

Last MLB appearance
- September 22, 1966, for the Chicago Cubs

MLB statistics
- Win–loss record: 1–0
- Earned run average: 1.80
- Innings pitched: 10
- Stats at Baseball Reference

Teams
- St. Louis Cardinals (1964); Chicago Cubs (1966)

David Barclay Dowling (born August 23, 1942) is an American former professional baseball player. Dowling was a left-handed pitcher, listed at 6 feet 2 inches (1.88 m) tall and 181 pounds (82 kg), who appeared in two Major League Baseball games, one for the 1964 St. Louis Cardinals and one for the 1966 Chicago Cubs. In the latter game, which would be his last in the Major Leagues, he pitched a complete game, 7–2 victory over the Cincinnati Reds at Wrigley Field on September 22, 1966.

== Early life ==
Dowling played for the Centralia Legion baseball team that won the 1958 state baseball tournament. During regional playoffs for the national title, he started two games, including a win-or-go-home, against future MLB pitcher, Dave McNally. The Centralia team lost the final game in extra frames despite a scoreless pitcher's duel between Dowling and McNally for nine innings. Dowling was a starter, and an all-state first team member, for the 1960 Chehalis high school boy's state champion basketball team, the only state title in the high school's history.

== Baseball career ==
Dowling signed with the Cardinals in 1963 after attending the University of California, Berkeley. After winning ten of 14 decisions in the high minors in 1964, Dowling was recalled to St. Louis during September, when rosters are expanded from 25 to 40 players. The Cardinals were embroiled in a tense, four-team scramble for the National League pennant, and Dowling saw action in only one game, the penultimate October 3, 1964, contest against the New York Mets at Busch Stadium. He pitched the ninth inning of a lopsided 15–5 loss to the last-place Mets, facing five batters and allowing two singles but no runs. But the defeat proved to be only a temporary setback for the Redbirds, as they won the NL championship on the season's last day (by one game over the Reds and Philadelphia Phillies) on October 4 and went on to win the 1964 World Series championship.

The following season, Dowling was claimed on waivers by the Cubs and he spent two years in the Chicago farm system before an end-of-season recall in 1966. The last-place Cubs started him against Cincinnati on September 22 and Dowling yielded only two earned runs — both coming in the first inning — on ten hits, going the distance to defeat veteran Reds' lefthander Joe Nuxhall. He never pitched again in the Majors, spending 1967 and 1968 working for minor league affiliates of the Cubs, Cardinals and San Francisco Giants. All told, Dowling yielded 12 hits in ten MLB innings, with no bases on balls and three strikeouts.

== Post career and life ==
Dowling became a dentist, working in Longview, Washington and Arizona. Daughter Commander Rebecca Dowling Calder, USNR, is a former F/A-18 Hornet pilot and the first woman to graduate from the US Navy's Strike Fighter Weapons School (TOPGUN) in 2004.
