= Barney Schultz =

American baseball player (1926–2015)

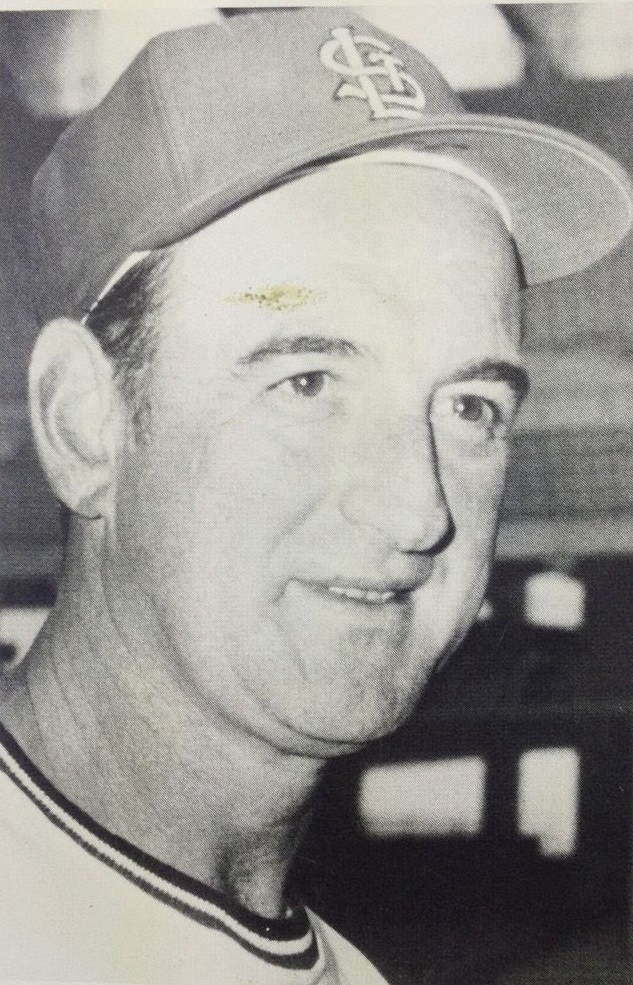
- Schultz in 1971
- Pitcher
- Born: August 15, 1926; Beverly, New Jersey, U.S.
- Died: September 6, 2015 (aged 89); Willingboro Township, New Jersey, U.S.
- Batted: Right Threw: Right

MLB debut
- April 12, 1955, for the St. Louis Cardinals

Last MLB appearance
- September 6, 1965, for the St. Louis Cardinals

MLB statistics
- Win–loss record: 20–20
- Earned run average: 3.63
- Strikeouts: 264
- Stats at Baseball Reference

Teams
- As player: St. Louis Cardinals (1955); Detroit Tigers (1959); Chicago Cubs (1961–1963); St. Louis Cardinals (1963–1965); As coach: St. Louis Cardinals (1971–1975); Chicago Cubs (1977); Nankai Hawks (1981–1982)

Career highlights and awards
- World Series champion (1964)

George Warren "Barney" Schultz (August 15, 1926 – September 6, 2015) was an American professional baseball player and coach. He was a knuckleball-throwing pitcher the Major League Baseball (MLB) for all or parts of seven seasons between 1955 and 1965 for the St. Louis Cardinals, Detroit Tigers and Chicago Cubs. He did not play a full Major League season until his 18th year in professional baseball. His best season came in 1964, when in just a little over two months with the Cardinals at the end of that season, he had a 1.64 ERA and 14 saves in 30 games, and played an important role in the Cardinals winning the 1964 National League pennant.

== Early life ==
Schultz was born in on August 15, 1926, in Beverly, New Jersey, to Leo Philip and Madeline Rose (Ashton) Schultz. An uncle gave him the nickname "Barney Google" early in life, which later became just Barney. He attended Burlington City High School, in Burlington, New Jersey, graduating in 1944. Schultz pitched on the high school baseball team. His high school classmates and baseball teammates included future Major League Baseball players Sammy Calderone (catcher) and Eddie Miksis (shortstop). Schultz once struck out 21 batters in a high school game, with Calderone as his catcher. While still in high school, he learned how to throw the knuckleball from a boy in his neighborhood, and worked on developing the pitch, though it was not the main pitch he relied upon at that time; unlike his later career when it became his principal pitch.

== Professional career ==
Schultz was signed by the Philadelphia Phillies in 1944 after playing at Burlington City High School.

=== Minor league and winter league ===
Schultz spent the majority of his career pitching in Minor League Baseball (MiLB), playing 11 years in the minors before first reaching Major League Baseball (MLB) in 1955. He had arm problems over this period. He started as an MiLB pitcher in 1944, and did not pitch his first full Major League season until 1962. Over his professional career he pitched all or parts of 21 MiLB seasons, pitching in 657 MiLB games; nearly 600 of them as a relief pitcher.

He played Class B baseball in the Phillies minor league system from 1944 to 1946, and in the Detroit Tigers minor league system from 1947 to 1948. In 1951, he was playing Class A baseball for the Chicago Cubs’ affiliated Des Moines Bruins, when he was waived and claimed by the Boston Braves, who assigned him to the Class A Denver Bears. He stayed with the Bears in 1952-53, the team changing its affiliation to the Pittsburgh Pirates. He played at the Double-A and Triple-A levels in the St. Louis Cardinal's farm system for some or all of each season from 1954 to 1958, until being traded to the Tigers in 1958, which season he finished with the Tigers' Triple-A affiliate, the Charleston, Senators. In 1959, he split time between Charleston and the Tigers.

He played for the Columbus Red Birds in 1954, under manager Johnny Keane. Keane believed Schultz’s best course to reach Major League Baseball was as a relief pitcher using the knuckleball, not as a starter. Keane used him in relief 34 times that season. Schultz again played under Keane in 1956, 1957 and part of 1958, principally as a reliever, for the Triple-A Omaha Cardinals. Keane would play an important role in Schultz’s future Major League career.

Schultz played winter league baseball in Venezuela for the Gavilanes de Maracaibo club of the Western Professional Baseball League, where he won seven consecutive strikeout titles from 1954 through 1960.

In 1960 and part of 1961, he was played for the Triple-A Houston Buffs, the Chicago Cubs' affiliate in the American Association. He arguably had his best MiLB season to date in 1961, pitching 24 games in relief for the Buffs, with a 2.76 ERA, 6–1 record, 40 strikeouts in 49 innings, and was called up to the Cubs in June. After pitching all of 1962 and 1963 for Major League teams, he spent a portion of the 1964 season playing for the Jacksonville Suns, the Cardinals’ Triple-A affiliate in the International League, having his best MiLB season with a 1.05 ERA, 8–5 record, and 70 strikeouts in 86 innings in 42 games. His 1.05 ERA was his lowest ERA at any level of professional baseball.

In 1965, he played 10 games for Jacksonville. In 1966, his final year of professional baseball, the 39-year old Schultz spent the season with the Triple-A Tulsa Oilers, the Cardinals' affiliate in the Pacific Coast League; pitching 25 games in relief with a 2–0 record and 3.24 ERA.

=== Major League ===
Schultz was strictly a relief pitcher during his Major League career, appearing in 227 games without any starts. He was an early specialist in the knuckleball. He had two good years with the Cubs, then was traded to the Cardinals where he had his best season, 1964, with 14 saves (a significant quantity in those days) and a 1.64 earned run average.

==== St. Louis Cardinals and Detroit Tigers (1955, 1959) ====
After 11 years in MiLB, Schultz pitched 19 games in relief for the St. Louis Cardinals in 1955. He was 1–2, with four saves and a 7.89 ERA. He did not return to Major League play until 1959, when he pitched in 13 games for the Detroit Tigers, with a 1–2 record and 4.42 ERA. The Cardinals had traded him to the Tigers in late-May 1958 for Ben Mateosky, but after the trade he spent the rest of the 1958 season with the Charleston Senators, the Tigers Triple-A affiliate in the American Association. In April 1960, the Tigers sold his contract rights to the Chicago Cubs.

==== Chicago Cubs (1961-63) ====
After playing all of 1960 and part of 1961 for the Houston Buffs, the Chicago Cubs' Triple-A affiliate in the American Association, he was called up to the Cubs in June 1961. He pitched 41 games in relief for the Cubs, with a 7–6 record, seven saves and a 2.70 ERA. He struck out 59 batters in 66.2 innings pitched.

After 18 years, Schultz pitched his first full Major League season in 1962, with the Cubs. He appeared in 51 games, with a 5–5 record, five saves, a 3.82 ERA and 58 strikeouts in 77.2 innings pitched. He tied a record by pitching in nine consecutive games. Schultz began the 1963 season with the Cubs, and was 1–0, with two saves and a 3.62 ERA. The Cubs originally waived him, but then traded him to the Cardinals on June 24 for Leo Burke.

==== St. Louis Cardinals (1963-65) ====
In 1963, Johnny Keane was the Cardinals manager, and wanted Schultz on the team. Schultz finished the 1963 season with the Cardinals, who ended the year in second place in the National League. Schultz pitched 24 games in relief, with a 2–0 record, one save and 3.57 ERA. In 1964, the Cardinals assigned Schultz to the Triple-A Jacksonville Suns of the International League to begin the season. He pitched extremely well in Jacksonville, with an 8–5 record and 1.05 ERA in 42 games.

The Cardinals called him up in August 1964, during their pennant drive. Keane made Schultz his closer. This move was a key part of Keane’s winning his only Major League pennant as a manager. In Schultz’s two months with the Cardinals during the regular season in 1964, he pitched in 30 games of the team’s last 60 games, with a 1.64 ERA and 14 saves, and a 1–3 record. Although he played well less than half the season, he was tied for fifth in the National League in saves. His 1.64 ERA and 14 saves were career bests.

Before Schultz joined the 1964 Cardinals on August 1, they were 53–49 and in sixth place, seven games out of first place. On September 29, they defeated the Philadelphia Phillies to put them in a tie for first place, with Schultz picking up a save in relief of Ray Sadecki, who achieved his 20th win of the season. On October 2, Schultz pitched a scoreless ninth inning in relief of Hall of Fame starting pitcher Bob Gibson, however, the Cardinals lost to the New York Mets, 1–0, but were holding a ½ game lead in first place.

The Cardinals went into the final game of the season tied for first place. They started the 18–9 Curt Simmons who gave up three runs in 4.1 innings, and then replaced him with Gibson in the fifth inning. Gibson pitched into the ninth inning, and recorded one out and gave up one run. Manager Keane then called in Schultz, who got the final two outs and the save. The Cardinals ended the season in first place, by one game. Simmons said that Schultz had certainly helped the Cardinals win the NL pennant that season. Keane said the Cardinals never would have won the pennant without Schultz.

Probably the most memorable moment of his entire career came in Game 3 of the 1964 World Series, in which he gave up a game-winning home run to future Hall of Fame center fielder Mickey Mantle in the nationally televised Saturday game. He came into the game in relief of Curt Simmons in the bottom of the ninth inning, in a 1–1 tie. Mantle was the first batter he faced. Mantle hit Schultz's first pitch for the game winning home run, making Schultz the losing pitcher. Schultz had given up only one home run during the season, but the knuckleball he threw Mantle did not break and was knee high over the plate. Earlier in the Series, he had been credited with a save in Game 1, giving up one run in three innings pitched in relief of Ray Sadecki; and the Cardinals ultimately won the Series in seven games. He appeared in two other games in that series, pitching a total of four innings in his four World Series games. He was 25th in NL Most Valuable Player voting that year.

In 1965, Keane went to manage the Yankees and Red Schoendinst became the Cardinals manager. Schultz pitched for the Cardinals in 34 games with a 3.83 ERA. He was sent back to Jacksonville in August, but returned in September to finish the season with the Cardinals.

=== Career ===
Schultz threw and batted right-handed, stood 6 feet 2 inches (1.88 m) tall and weighed 200 pounds (91 kg). In September 1967, he was reactivated by the Cardinals so that he could receive a Major League pension, needing 32 more days; but did not play in any games. He finished his seven-year Major League career, with a 20–20 record and 35 saves in 227 games, all pitched in relief. He had a 3.63 career ERA, with 264 strikeouts in and 116 walks in 346.2 innings pitched.

== Coaching career ==
He was a player-coach with the Tulsa Oilers in 1966. After his playing career ended, Schultz was the Cardinals' roving minor league pitching instructor from 1967 to 1970, and then the Cardinals' Major League pitching coach from 1971 to 1975. It is also reported he was a Cardinals coach in 1967 when the team went on to win the World Series; with Schultz receiving his second World Series ring with the Cardinals. Cardinals pitchers Bob Forsch and John Denny praised Schultz’s work with them. He was the Chicago Cubs' pitching coach in 1977, and a special assignment coach for the Cubs from 1978 to 1980. He coached future Hall of Fame closer Bruce Sutter with the Cubs.

In the early 1980s, Schultz coached for two years with the Nankai Hawks of the Japan Pacific League.

== Honors ==
In 1988, Schultz was inducted into the South Jersey Baseball Hall of Fame.

== Personal life and death ==
Throughout much of his career, Schultz lived in Beverly with his wife and children, working in the off season as a carpenter and haberdasher. After retiring, Schultz was a resident of Edgewater Park, New Jersey for 50 years, where his home was filled with memorabilia of his baseball career. He later moved to Mt. Laurel, New Jersey in 2010. In his later years, he and his wife became avid Philadelphia Phillies baseball fans (the team he was signed by in 1944 and that the Cardinals had beaten out for the 1964 NL pennant).

Cardinals' utility catcher Bob Uecker was sometimes called upon to catch when Schultz was brought in to pitch. It was from that experience that Uecker drew some of his material when joking about the difficulties of catching the knuckleball.

Schultz was a member of St. Joseph's Roman Catholic Church in Beverly his entire life. He died on September 6, 2015, in Willingboro, New Jersey, on the 50th anniversary of his final MLB game. He was survived by his wife of 61 years, Frances (Elder) Schultz, three children, six grandchildren and eleven great-grandchildren.

== See also ==
- List of St. Louis Cardinals coaches
