= Gordie Richardson =

American baseball player (born 1939)

- Pitcher
- Born: July 19, 1939 (age 87); Colquitt, Georgia, U.S.
- Batted: Right Threw: Left

MLB debut
- July 26, 1964, for the St. Louis Cardinals

Last MLB appearance
- June 5, 1966, for the New York Mets

MLB statistics
- Win–loss record: 6–6
- Earned run average: 4.04
- Strikeouts: 86
- Stats at Baseball Reference

Teams
- St. Louis Cardinals (1964); New York Mets (1965–1966)

Career highlights and awards
- World Series champion (1964)

Gordon Clark Richardson (born July 19, 1939) is an American former professional baseball player, a left-handed pitcher who played in the major leagues from 1964–66 for the St. Louis Cardinals and New York Mets. He stood 6 feet (1.8 m) tall and weighed 185 pounds (84 kg) as an active player.

As a rookie in 1964, Richardson made a substantial contribution to the eventual National League and 1964 World Series champion Cardinals. After a stellar 9–3 record and 1.55 earned run average for the Triple-A Jacksonville Suns, he was recalled by the Cardinals and made his major league debut as a starting pitcher against the first-place Philadelphia Phillies on July 26 at Connie Mack Stadium. Richardson responded with a complete game, 6–1 victory in which he gave up only five hits and three bases on balls. It was Richardson's only complete game in the majors. He also recorded his first major league save against the Phillies on September 30 at St. Louis, preserving an 8–5 win for Redbird lefthander Curt Simmons. Richardson's efforts were crucial, as they enabled the Cardinals to overtake the Phillies to finish in first place in the National League by a single game.

Richardson appeared in 19 games for the 1964 Cardinals, 13 in relief, fashioning a 4–2 record and a 2.30 earned run average in 47 innings pitched. However, he was not effective in the 1964 World Series, giving up three earned runs in two-thirds of an inning over two appearances.

During the 1964 offseason, the Cardinals traded Richardson and outfielder Johnny Lewis to the New York Mets in exchange for Tracy Stallard. Richardson appeared in parts of the 1965 and 1966 seasons for New York, largely as a relief pitcher. All told, Richardson gave up 105 hits and 37 bases on balls, with 86 strikeouts, in 118 major league innings. He retired from baseball after the 1966 season, his tenth as a professional.
