= Jerry Buchek =

American baseball player (1942–2019)

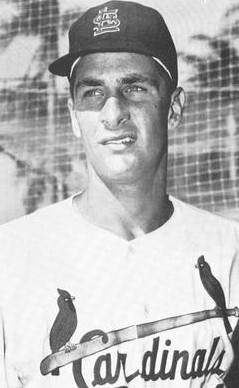
- Buchek in 1965
- Infielder
- Born: May 9, 1942; St. Louis, Missouri, U.S.
- Died: January 2, 2019 (aged 76); Springfield, Missouri, U.S.
- Batted: Right Threw: Right

MLB debut
- June 30, 1961, for the St. Louis Cardinals

Last MLB appearance
- September 29, 1968, for the New York Mets

MLB statistics
- Batting average: .220
- Home runs: 22
- Runs batted in: 108
- Stats at Baseball Reference

Teams
- St. Louis Cardinals (1961, 1963–1966); New York Mets (1967–1968)

Career highlights and awards
- World Series champion: 1964

Gerald Peter Buchek (boo-check; May 9, 1942 – January 2, 2019) was an American middle infielder and third baseman who played all or parts of seven seasons in Major League Baseball (MLB) for the St. Louis Cardinals and New York Mets. Buchek threw and batted right-handed, stood 5 feet 11 inches (1.80 m) tall and weighed 185 pounds (84 kg).

== Career ==
Born in St. Louis, Missouri, Buchek signed a $59,000 bonus contract with his hometown Cardinals upon graduation from McKinley High School. He began his professional career as an 18-year-old at the highest levels of minor league baseball, splitting the 1960 season between Double-A and Triple-A. He got his first taste of major league action in June 1961 and spent part of 1963 with the Cardinals before making the big league roster in 1964 and spending five consecutive full seasons in the majors.

In 1964, Buchek played in only 35 games, largely as a backup to shortstop Dick Groat and second baseman Julián Javier, collecting six hits in 30 at bats. But it was a memorable season, as the Cardinals prevailed in a late-September four-team pennant scramble to win their first National League title in 18 years. Then they defeated the New York Yankees in seven games in the 1964 World Series. Buchek appeared as a defensive replacement in four games at second base, and in his lone plate appearance, in Game 6, he singled off Jim Bouton.

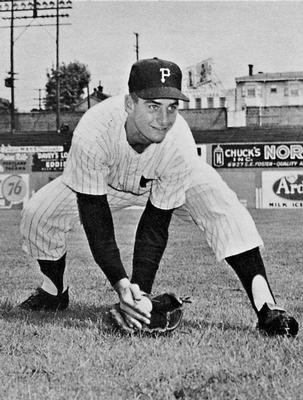
Buchek in 1961

Buchek remained with the Cardinals as a backup middle infielder in 1965 and 1966, appearing in 55 and then 100 games respectively. However, with Groat (then Dal Maxvill) and Javier established as the Redbirds' double-play combination, he did not break into the regular lineup, starting a total of 69 games at shortstop and 20 at second base during those two seasons. On May 12, 1966, he scored the first run ever at Busch Memorial Stadium.

Buchek was traded along with Art Mahaffey and Tony Martínez from the Cardinals to the Mets for Ed Bressoud, Danny Napoleon and cash on April 1, 1967. The Mets were seeking a new second baseman after trading four-year veteran Ron Hunt to the Los Angeles Dodgers. The Mets' general manager, Bing Devine, had signed Buchek when he was front-office boss of the Cardinals in 1960. In 1967, Buchek started 92 games at second base (along with 14 games at third base and five at shortstop), and set personal bests in games played (124), hits (97), home runs (14) and runs batted in (41). Among Mets fans he was known for starting an improbable comeback victory against the Atlanta Braves on July 9, 1967. Down 4–3 in the bottom of the ninth with two outs and nobody on base, Buchek, batting .230, was sent in to pinch hit for Bud Harrelson, who already had four hits, including a double, that game. Buchek hit a home run to tie the game, and the Mets went on to score another run to win 5–4. But in 1968, he fell to third on the Mets' second base depth chart, behind both Ken Boswell and Phil Linz, and batted only .182.

During that off-season, Buchek was traded twice, first back to the Cardinals and then to the Philadelphia Phillies. He spent 1969 with the Phillies' Triple-A Eugene farm club, where he batted .246 in 127 games, then retired from baseball at age 27. For his MLB career, he batted .220 with 259 hits, 35 doubles, 11 triples, 22 home runs and 108 runs batted in in 421 games played.

Buchek worked as a union meatcutter for National Supermarkets in St. Louis, Missouri after baseball, enjoying fishing with friends.

Buchek died on January 2, 2019, in Springfield, Missouri, at the age of 76.
