= Charlie James (baseball) =

American baseball player (born 1937)

- Outfielder
- Born: December 22, 1937 (age 88); St. Louis, Missouri, U.S.
- Batted: Right Threw: Right

MLB debut
- August 2, 1960, for the St. Louis Cardinals

Last MLB appearance
- September 27, 1965, for the Cincinnati Reds

MLB statistics
- Batting average: .255
- Home runs: 29
- Runs batted in: 172
- Stats at Baseball Reference

Teams
- St. Louis Cardinals (1960–1964); Cincinnati Reds (1965)

Career highlights and awards
- World Series champion (1964)

Charles Wesley James (born December 22, 1937) is an American former professional baseball player. James was an outfielder over all or parts of six Major League Baseball seasons (1960–65) with the St. Louis Cardinals and Cincinnati Reds, appearing in 510 games. Born in St. Louis, Missouri, he grew up in suburban Rock Hill and graduated from Webster Groves High School. James was also a letterman as a football halfback for the University of Missouri Tigers in 1956 and 1957 before starting his professional baseball career. He later earned a bachelor's degree in electrical engineering at Washington University in St. Louis.

James threw and batted right-handed and was listed as 6 feet 1 inch (1.85 m) tall and 195 pounds (88 kg). He signed with his hometown Cardinals and began his baseball career in the high minors in 1958, where he collected 104 runs batted in in the Double-A Texas League and made the Triple-A International League's All-Star team in successive seasons.

The Cardinals recalled him in August 1960, and he spent the rest of his baseball career in the majors. James platooned in right field with left-handed hitter Joe Cunningham in 1961, then was the Redbirds' most-used right-fielder in 1962, starting 95 games and hitting a career-best .276. In 1963, he shared the left field job with Baseball Hall of Famer Stan Musial in Musial's last season in the game. He began 1964 as the Cardinals' regular left fielder, but after he had started 40 games, St. Louis acquired future Hall of Famer Lou Brock from the Chicago Cubs on June 15, and Brock took command of the position, hitting .348 and leading the Cardinals into the 1964 World Series. James spent the rest of the season as an occasional right fielder and frequent pinch hitter, and his batting average fell to .223. In the World Series against the New York Yankees, James was hitless in three at bats as a pinch hitter, but the Cardinals prevailed in seven games and James earned a championship ring.

James was traded to the Reds that offseason but his playing load was reduced even further in 1965. He appeared in only 26 games and collected only eight hits in 39 at bats. Although he went to spring training with the 1966 Reds, he did not make the early-season 28-man roster, and retired rather than report to Triple-A.

In his 510 MLB games, James batted .255 with 358 hits, 56 doubles, nine triples, 29 home runs, and 172 runs batted in. With his degree in electrical engineering, he built a successful business career as the president of a Missouri-based manufacturing company, retiring in 1998.
