= Leo Burke (baseball) =

American baseball player (1934–2023)

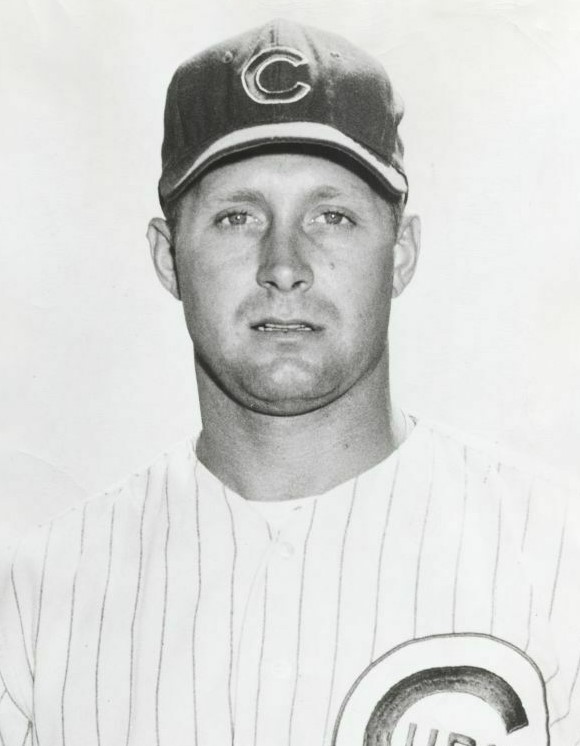
- Utilityman
- Born: May 6, 1934; Hagerstown, Maryland, U.S.
- Died: October 13, 2023 (aged 89); Riner, Virginia, U.S.
- Batted: Right Threw: Right

MLB debut
- September 7, 1958, for the Baltimore Orioles

Last MLB appearance
- May 26, 1965, for the Chicago Cubs

MLB statistics
- Batting average: .239
- Home runs: 9
- Runs batted in: 45
- Stats at Baseball Reference

Teams
- Baltimore Orioles (1958–1959); Los Angeles Angels (1961–1962); St. Louis Cardinals (1963); Chicago Cubs (1963–1965)

Leo Patrick Burke (May 6, 1934 – October 13, 2023) was an American utility player in Major League Baseball. The graduate of Virginia Tech played two full seasons and parts of five others in MLB as a rightfielder, second baseman and third baseman for the Baltimore Orioles, Los Angeles Angels, St. Louis Cardinals and Chicago Cubs (1958–59; 1961–65). He threw and batted right-handed, stood 5 feet 11 inches (1.80 m) and weighed 185 pounds (84 kg).

Burke was involved in a waiver deal between the Cardinals and Cubs on June 24, 1963, when he was sent to Chicago for relief pitcher Barney Schultz, who would play a major role in the Cardinals' 1964 pennant-winning season. Burke played 98 of his 165 MLB games in a Cub uniform.

During his Major League career, Burke batted .239 with 72 hits, nine home runs and 45 runs batted in.

Burke died in Riner, Virginia, on October 13, 2023, at the age of 89.

== Sources ==
- Career statistics from MLB · Baseball Reference · Baseball Reference (Minors) · Retrosheet · Baseball Almanac
