= Ernie Broglio =

American baseball player (1935–2019)

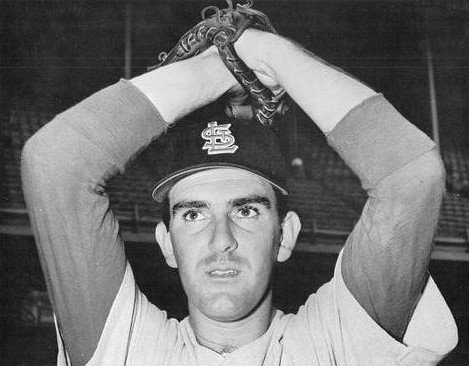
- Broglio in 1961
- Pitcher
- Born: August 27, 1935; Berkeley, California, U.S.
- Died: July 16, 2019 (aged 83); San Jose, California, U.S.
- Batted: Right Threw: Right

MLB debut
- April 11, 1959, for the St. Louis Cardinals

Last MLB appearance
- July 2, 1966, for the Chicago Cubs

MLB statistics
- Win–loss record: 77–74
- Earned run average: 3.74
- Strikeouts: 849
- Stats at Baseball Reference

Teams
- St. Louis Cardinals (1959–1964); Chicago Cubs (1964–1966)

Career highlights and awards
- NL wins leader (1960)

Ernest Gilbert Broglio (/ˈbroʊlioʊ/ BROH-lee-oh; August 27, 1935 – July 16, 2019) was an American professional baseball pitcher. He played in Major League Baseball (MLB) for the St. Louis Cardinals and Chicago Cubs from 1959 to 1966.

After attending high school and junior college in his native California, Broglio signed with the independent Oakland Oaks of the Pacific Coast League. He was acquired by the New York Giants in 1956. After two seasons in the Giants’ minor league system—when he won 17 games each year—Broglio was traded to the St. Louis Cardinals in October 1958.

Although he led the National League in wins with 21 for the 1960 Cardinals and won 18 for the 1963 Redbirds, Broglio is best remembered as the "other player" in the ultimately lopsided trade that sent future Baseball Hall of Fame outfielder Lou Brock from the Chicago Cubs to the Cardinals on June 15, 1964. His career in the majors came to an end during the 1966 season. He died on July 16, 2019, from cancer.

== Early life ==
Broglio was the second child born in Berkeley, California, to his parents Anna and Joseph Broglio. After ten years, in 1945, his family moved to El Cerrito, California. With his dad working seven days a week, carrying out two jobs, Ernie was self-motivated to play baseball and played on the varsity high school teams for baseball and basketball as an eighth grader. At the age of 17, Ernie graduated from El Cerrito High School and was signed by the PCL Oaks.

== Baseball career ==
=== Minor Leagues ===
In 1953, at the age of 17, Broglio held an earned run average (ERA) of 6.89 in 11 games with 2 wins and 4 losses in his first year on the Oakland Oaks roster. He improved throughout his years in the minor leagues to have a 2.51 ERA in 1957 with the Dallas Eagles. In his minor league career, Broglio was part of many trades between organizations, playing for the Oakland Oaks, Modesto Reds, Stockton Ports, Dallas Eagles, and Phoenix Giants. On October 8, 1958, he was involved in a transaction involving five players from the Giants and the St. Louis Cardinals. In the Cardinal organization, Broglio went on an exhibition tour that led to his promotion into the major leagues.

=== St. Louis Cardinals ===
On April 11, 1959, Broglio made his major league debut for the St. Louis Cardinals, at the age of 23. After four appearances, he had a 9.00 ERA with an 0–2 record, and did not get his first win until his match-up against Philadelphia on June 16 which brought his record to 1–5. Broglio ended his first season with a record of 7–12 with an ERA of 4.72 over 181.1 innings pitched and 35 appearances. Not projected to be a part of the Cardinals' starting rotation in the 1960 season, Broglio made his first appearance in relief on the second game of the season pitching six innings against the Giants. After this performance, he alternated between relief innings and starts that brought him to a 9–4 record with a 2.86 ERA, and got him into the starting rotation for the next eighteen appearances. The final half of the season resulted in a 2.74 ERA and a 21–9 record. Broglio led the league along with Warren Spahn in wins, and his win percentage (.700) was second to teammate Lindy McDaniel's (.750). He also had the second best ERA in the league, and was ranked third in the Cy Young Award voting for the season. In addition, Broglio received the National League Sophomore of the Year Award that season. This award is not well known; MLB discontinued the award in 1962 due to the lack of interest. The award was given to the player who performed the best during their second full season, avoiding what some baseball fans would call the sophomore "jinx" or sophomore slump for hitters. Broglio had arm problems over the remaining years of his career with the Cardinals which contributed to the general management's decision to involve Broglio in a five-player trade with the Chicago Cubs that resulted in the Cardinals obtaining Lou Brock.

=== Chicago Cubs ===
When Broglio was traded to the Cubs for Brock, it was seen as a heist for the Cubs. Broglio had won 18 games the year before and was considered a top-flight starting pitcher. Brock—one of the fastest men in the game with surprising power as a hitter—had been a disappointment in Chicago. But Brock would bat .348 for the rest of the 1964 season, leading the Cardinals to a world championship. He then would play another 15 years, appear in two more World Series (1967–68), and set the career stolen base record (938, since broken by Rickey Henderson). The Cardinals organization knew that Broglio's arm would not last much longer, having had twenty cortisone shots in his shoulder in the 1961 season. Broglio's performance with the Cubs was what led a majority of baseball fans to view the transaction between the Cardinals and Cubs to be a lopsided trade. He had a record of 1–6 his first year with the Cubs in 1965 and a 2–6 record in 1966 which made the organization send him down to the minor leagues. ESPN ranked this to be the number one, worst mid season trade in baseball history.

== Career statistics ==
In an eight-year career, Broglio made 259 appearances, accumulating 849 strikeouts in 1337.1 innings pitched, and he ended his career with a 3.74 earned run average. Broglio's final record in the major leagues accounted for 77 wins and 74 losses.

== See also ==
- List of Major League Baseball annual wins leaders
