= Johnny Lewis (baseball) =

American baseball player (1939–2018)

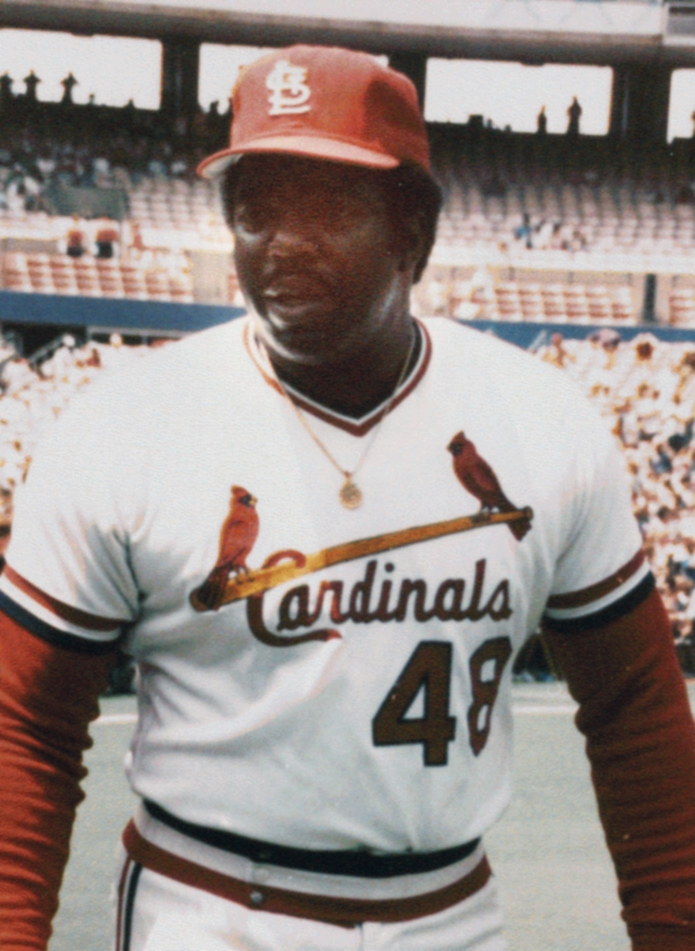
- Outfielder
- Born: August 10, 1939; Greenville, Alabama, U.S.
- Died: July 29, 2018 (aged 78); Pensacola, Florida, U.S.
- Batted: Left Threw: Right

MLB debut
- April 14, 1964, for the St. Louis Cardinals

Last MLB appearance
- June 11, 1967, for the New York Mets

MLB statistics
- Batting average: .227
- Home runs: 22
- Runs batted in: 74
- Stats at Baseball Reference

Teams
- St. Louis Cardinals (1964); New York Mets (1965–1967)

Johnny Joe Lewis (August 10, 1939 – July 29, 2018) was an American professional baseball player, coach, scout and front-office executive. An outfielder, he appeared in 266 games in Major League Baseball for the St. Louis Cardinals and New York Mets from 1964 to 1967. He batted left-handed, threw right-handed, and was listed as weighing 189 pounds (86 kg) and 6 ft 1 in (1.85 m) in height. He was born in Greenville, Alabama.

Lewis was signed as a free agent by the Detroit Tigers, but his career record lists no games played for a Detroit farm team; his first pro season, 1959, was spent with three Class D clubs in the Cardinals' organization. In 1960, he led the Class C Northern League in home runs and runs batted in, and was named an All-Star; the following year, he was promoted all the way to Double-A, and made the Texas League All-Star team as well. Lewis was an early-season member of the 1964 Cardinals, making his debut on April 14 against the Los Angeles Dodgers. But he was sent back to Triple-A in June after playing in 40 games; he was recalled when the minor-league season ended but did not appear in a game during the Cardinals' thrilling, late-season stretch drive that brought them the National League pennant and World Series title. On December 7, 1964, he was included in a four-player transaction to the Mets, for whom he would play 226 games over three seasons.

As a Met, Lewis is probably best known for breaking up a Jim Maloney no-hitter in the 11th inning with a game-winning homer. In that June 14, 1965, contest at Crosley Field, Maloney threw ten no-hit innings, until Lewis' homer in the 11th broke the skein. Two batters after Lewis, Roy McMillan reached Maloney for a single. Maloney ended up with a complete game, two-hit defeat, 1–0, fanning 18 New York hitters. The Mets' veteran pitcher Frank Lary and reliever Larry Bearnarth combined for the shutout, allowing seven hits. Lewis was nicknamed "The Gunner" with the Mets for his ability to throw out runners; he played most of his games in right field (175) and center field (57) during his MLB tenure.

Lewis' professional playing career ended in 1968 after ten seasons. He rejoined the Cardinals in 1969 and became the club's administrative coordinator of player development and scouting. He returned to the field as a coach for the Cardinals (1973–76, 1984–89) at the big-league level—the Redbirds' first African-American coach—and managed their Rookie League affiliate, the Calgary Cardinals, in 1977 and 1978. He also spent many years as a St. Louis scout.

During his major league playing career, Lewis collected 174 hits, with 24 doubles, six triples and 22 home runs, batting .227 with 74 career RBI. Defensively, he had 20 outfield assists.

Johnny Lewis died July 29, 2018, in Pensacola, Florida, at age 78.
