= Joe Moeller =

American baseball player (born 1943)

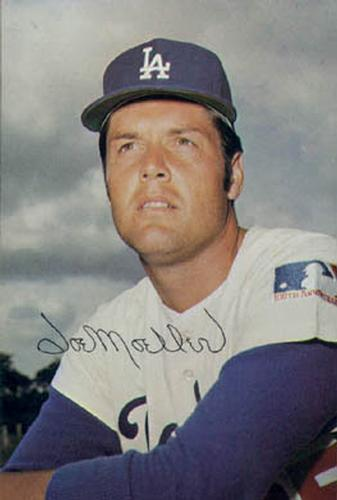
- Pitcher
- Born: February 15, 1943 (age 82); Blue Island, Illinois, U.S.
- Batted: Right Threw: Right

MLB debut
- April 12, 1962, for the Los Angeles Dodgers

Last MLB appearance
- September 29, 1971, for the Los Angeles Dodgers

MLB statistics
- Win–loss record: 26–36
- Earned run average: 4.01
- Strikeouts: 307
- Stats at Baseball Reference

Teams
- Los Angeles Dodgers (1962, 1964, 1966–1971)

Joseph Douglas Moeller Jr. (born February 15, 1943) is an American former pitcher in Major League Baseball who played for the Los Angeles Dodgers from 1962 to 1971.

== Early life ==
Moeller was born in Blue Island, Illinois to Joseph Douglas Sr. and Lois (née Reymeyer), the second of three children. In 1951, the family moved to Manhattan Beach, California where he attended Mira Costa High School and became known for baseball and basketball. As an All-Conference pitcher, he complied 0.44 earned run average and attracted attention from a half-dozen major league scouts.

Shortly after his high school graduation, the Dodgers signed Moeller and his brother Gary to a hefty bonus of $100,000. Joe received around $75,000 of the bonus.

== Career ==
Moeller is the youngest starting pitcher in Dodgers history at 19 years, 2 months of age.

Moeller's Dodger teammates resented his sizeable bonus. In particular, Duke Snider, the Dodgers' star centerfielder from their days in Brooklyn, was openly resentful of Moeller's bonus; in his prime, Snider had not made more than $44,000 a season, and he felt young unproven players with large bonuses did not belong in the Majors. In 1962, at Snider's saying, the team voted Moeller only half the playoff cut despite Moeller having played the full season and contributed to the team's run. Snider would later apologize to Moeller for his behavior towards him.

He pitched two innings in the 1966 World Series against the Baltimore Orioles.

== Personal life ==
In 1961, Moeller married his high school sweetheart Elizabeth "Lee" Burroughs. They had four children together but divorced 14 years later. He remarried in 2003, to Trudy Breneman.

His son Gary played baseball at Cal State Fullerton and achieved professional success in Sweden and New Zealand.
