= Leo Burke (footballer) =

Australian rules footballer

Personal information
- Full name: Leo John Burke
- Born: 10 September 1891; Kew, Victoria
- Died: 8 November 1957 (aged 66); Mentone, Victoria
- Original team: St Ignatius

Playing career^{1}
Years	Club	Games (Goals)
1915–19	Richmond	36 (0)
- ^{1} Playing statistics correct to the end of 1919.

Leo John Burke (10 September 1891 – 8 November 1957) was an Australian rules footballer who played with Richmond in the Victorian Football League (VFL).
