= Phil Gagliano =

American baseball player (1941–2016)

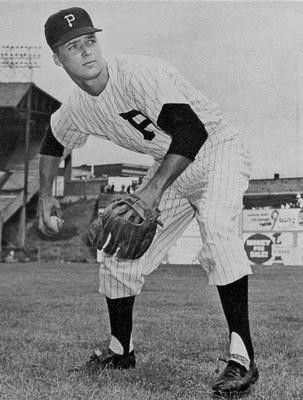
- Utility player
- Born: December 27, 1941; Memphis, Tennessee, U.S.
- Died: December 19, 2016 (aged 74); Hollister, Missouri, U.S.
- Batted: Right Threw: Right

MLB debut
- April 16, 1963, for the St. Louis Cardinals

Last MLB appearance
- October 1, 1974, for the Cincinnati Reds

MLB statistics
- Batting average: .238
- Home runs: 14
- Runs batted in: 159
- Stats at Baseball Reference

Teams
- St. Louis Cardinals (1963–1970); Chicago Cubs (1970); Boston Red Sox (1971–1972); Cincinnati Reds (1973–1974)

Career highlights and awards
- World Series champion (1967)

Philip Joseph Gagliano (December 27, 1941 – December 19, 2016) was an American professional baseball player who forged a 12-season, 702-game career in Major League Baseball as a utility infielder/outfielder and pinch hitter for four clubs (principally the St. Louis Cardinals) between 1963 and 1974. He threw and batted right-handed, and was listed as 6 feet 1 inch (1.85 m) tall and 180 pounds (82 kg).

A native of Memphis, Tennessee, Gagliano came from a baseball family; he was the nephew of a prominent American Legion and high school coach, Tony Gagliano, and his younger brother Ralph also was an infielder in professional baseball who appeared in the majors, although only for one game in 1965. Phil graduated from Memphis' Christian Brothers High School, where he played for his uncle and was a teammate and schoolmate of Tim McCarver. Gagliano and McCarver, as fellow Cardinals from 1963 through 1969, became two of the four Christian Brothers High School baseball alumni to have played in the World Series as of 2017.

Gagliano reached the majors for the first time after three full years in the St. Louis farm system; then he spent 31/2 months of the 1964 season on the Redbird roster as a pinch hitter and backup second baseman before returning to Triple-A to complete his minor-league seasoning. In 1965, he spent the first of ten full seasons as a major-leaguer, and, with regular second baseman Julián Javier hobbled by injuries, established career-bests in games played (122), games started (90, including 48 at second base, 25 in the outfield, and 19 at third base), and in most offensive categories, including hits (87), runs scored (46), extra-base hits (24), home runs (eight) and runs batted in (53, fifth on the club). He got into another 90 games for the Cardinals in 1966, starting 39 contests at third base and further cementing his role as a utilityman. He helped the 1967 and 1968 Cardinals win National League pennants, and appeared in each World Series that followed as a pinch hitter, going hitless in four at bats; he earned a championship ring when the Cardinals defeated the Boston Red Sox in seven games in 1967.

Gagliano's tenure in St. Louis ended in May 1970 when he was traded to the Chicago Cubs, who used him in only 26 games over the last four months of the campaign. After his contract was purchased by the Boston Red Sox from the Cubs at the Winter Meetings on December 2, 1970, he established himself as one of the majors' top pinch hitters of the day. From 1971 through 1973, he batted .364, .346 and .366, with 32 hits, in pinch-hitting roles for the 1971–1972 Red Sox and the 1973 Cincinnati Reds. But in 1974, Gagliano could muster only two hits and 15 bases on balls in 46 plate appearances, and he retired from baseball.

In his 702 MLB games, Gagliano collected 336 hits, with 50 doubles, seven triples, 14 home runs, and 159 career RBI. He batted .238 lifetime. Despite his success from 1971–1973, he batted only .201 over his 12-year career as a pinch hitter. In the field, he appeared in 171 games at second base, 133 at third, 64 as a corner outfielder, 30 as a first baseman, and two as a shortstop.

After leaving baseball, he worked in sales and operations management and retired in 2002. Phil Gagliano died at his home in Hollister, Missouri, on December 19, 2016, at the age of 74.
