= Dave Bakenhaster =

American baseball player (1945–2014)

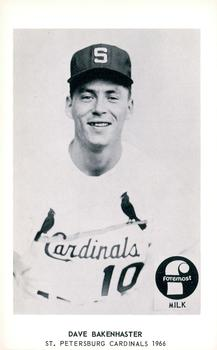
- Pitcher
- Born: March 5, 1945; Columbus, Ohio, U.S.
- Died: July 30, 2014 (aged 69); Galena, Ohio, U.S.
- Batted: Right Threw: Right

MLB debut
- June 20, 1964, for the St. Louis Cardinals

Last MLB appearance
- July 22, 1964, for the St. Louis Cardinals

MLB statistics
- Win–loss record: 0–0
- Earned run average: 6.00
- Strikeouts: 0
- Stats at Baseball Reference

Teams
- St. Louis Cardinals (1964)

David Lee Bakenhaster (March 5, 1945 – July 30, 2014) was an American professional baseball pitcher who appeared in two games in Major League Baseball as a member of the 1964 St. Louis Cardinals. Born in Columbus, Ohio, and raised in nearby Dublin, he threw and batted right-handed and was listed as 5 feet 10 inches (1.78 m) tall and 168 pounds (76 kg).

Bakenhaster signed with the Cardinals for a $40,000 bonus in 1963 after he graduated from Dublin Coffman High School. The Cardinals protected him from the first-year player draft by putting him on their 25-man MLB roster for 1964. But he would appear in only two games and hurl only three full innings as a Redbird.

He made his major-league debut at the age of 19 on June 20, 1964, at Busch Stadium. He entered a contest against the San Francisco Giants in a low-leverage situation, with St. Louis trailing 10–1 in the eighth inning. Bakenhaster allowed six hits and four unearned runs in two full innings as the Giants rolled, 14–3. One month and two days later, on July 22, he appeared in his second and last MLB game, another one-sided home game, this time against the Pittsburgh Pirates. Bakenhaster again worked the ninth inning, allowing a two-run home run to Bill Mazeroski and surrendering the final two runs in an eventual 13–2 Pittsburgh romp.

The Cardinals then sent Bakenhaster to the minor leagues for the remainder of 1964; he escaped the first-year player draft but never returned to the majors. He missed the 1968 season while serving in the military, and retired from the game after the 1970 season. In his brief MLB career, he posted a 0–0 won–lost record and a 6.00 earned run average, with nine hits and one base on balls in three full innings pitched. He did not record a strikeout.

After leaving baseball, Bakenhaster worked for 34 years in a warehouse operated by Exel Logistics, serving the Nabisco Brands Food Company in Columbus, Ohio. In 1975, he married the former Carolyn Harr. In 2002, he was elected to the inaugural class for the Dublin Coffman High School Athletic Hall of Fame.
