= Ed Spiezio =

American baseball player (born 1941)

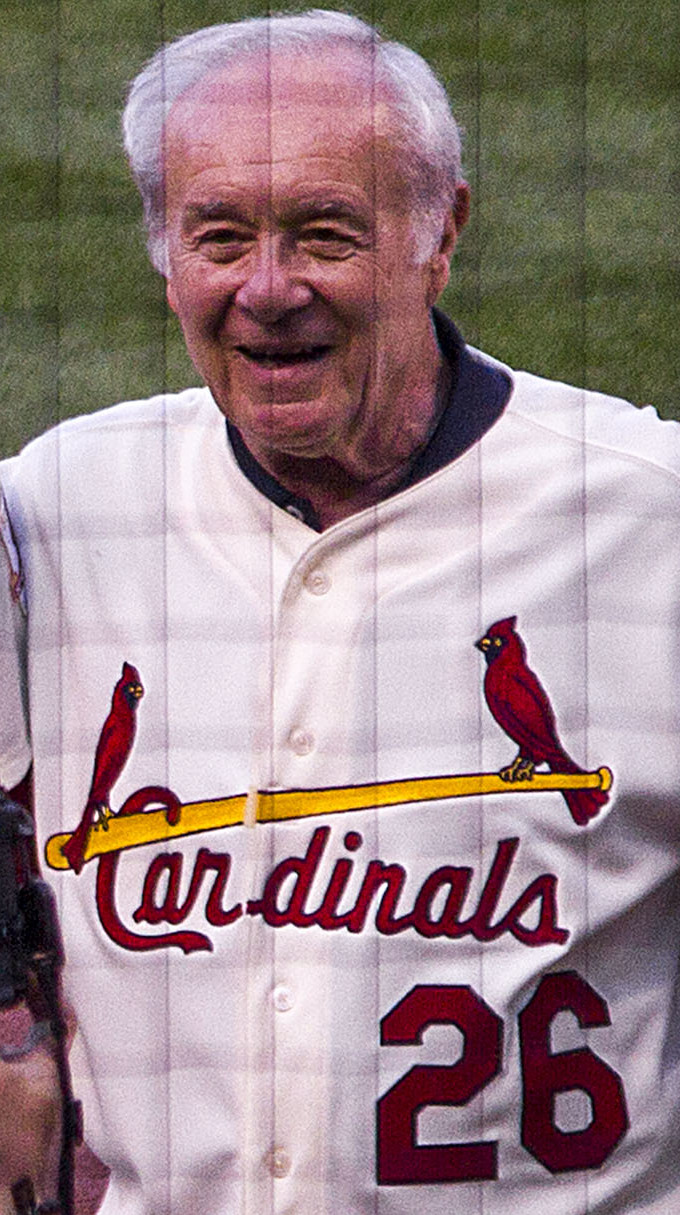
- Spiezio in 2017
- Third baseman
- Born: October 31, 1941 (age 84); Joliet, Illinois, U.S.
- Batted: Right Threw: Right

MLB debut
- July 23, 1964, for the St. Louis Cardinals

Last MLB appearance
- September 27, 1972, for the Chicago White Sox

MLB statistics
- Batting average: .238
- Home runs: 39
- Runs batted in: 174
- Stats at Baseball Reference

Teams
- St. Louis Cardinals (1964–1968); San Diego Padres (1969–1972); Chicago White Sox (1972)

Career highlights and awards
- 2× World Series champions (1964, 1967)

Edward Wayne Spiezio (born October 31, 1941) is an American former professional baseball third baseman. He played in Major League Baseball (MLB) from 1964 to 1972 for the St. Louis Cardinals, San Diego Padres and Chicago White Sox. Listed at 5 feet 11 inches (1.80 m) and 180 pounds (82 kg), he batted and threw right-handed.

== Career ==
Spiezio spent five years with the Cardinals, being a member of the 1964 World Series and 1967 World Series championship teams, although he only played in the latter series. He also played in the 1968 World Series, which the Cardinals lost.

Spiezio also collected the first hit, first home run, and scored the first run in San Diego Padres history. This took place on April 8, 1969, in the bottom of the fifth inning against Houston Astros right-hander Don Wilson.

In a nine-season career, Spiezio hit .238 (367-for-1544) with 39 home runs and 174 runs batted in, including 126 runs, 56 doubles, four triples, and 16 stolen bases in 554 games played.

Spiezio also played for four different minor-league teams in parts of five seasons spanning 1963–1972, posting a .263 average with 47 homers and 191 RBI in 383 games.

He also played for the Tiburones de La Guaira club of the Venezuelan Winter League.

== Personal life ==
Ed Spiezio is the father of Scott Spiezio, who played in MLB from 1996 to 2007 and completed his major-league career with the Cardinals. They are regarded as the third father-son tandem in Cardinals' history.

== See also ==
- List of second-generation Major League Baseball players
