= Curt Simmons =

American baseball player (1929–2022)

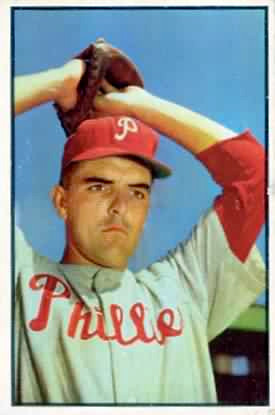
- Baseball card of Simmons with the Philadelphia Phillies in 1953
- Pitcher
- Born: May 19, 1929; Whitehall Township, Pennsylvania, U.S.
- Died: December 13, 2022 (aged 93); Ambler, Pennsylvania, U.S.
- Batted: Left Threw: Left

MLB debut
- September 28, 1947, for the Philadelphia Phillies

Last MLB appearance
- October 1, 1967, for the California Angels

MLB statistics
- Win–loss record: 193–183
- Earned run average: 3.54
- Strikeouts: 1,697
- Stats at Baseball Reference

Teams
- Philadelphia Phillies (1947–1960); St. Louis Cardinals (1960–1966); Chicago Cubs (1966–1967); California Angels (1967)

Career highlights and awards
- 3× All-Star (1952, 1953, 1957); World Series champion (1964); Philadelphia Phillies Wall of Fame

Curtis Thomas Simmons (May 19, 1929 – December 13, 2022) was an American professional baseball left-handed pitcher, who played in Major League Baseball (MLB) from 1947 to 1950 and 1952 to 1967. Along with right-hander Robin Roberts (a member of the Baseball Hall of Fame), Simmons was one of the twin anchors of the starting rotation of the "Whiz Kids", the Philadelphia Phillies' 1950 National League (NL) championship team. A three-time MLB All-Star, he also played for the St. Louis Cardinals, Chicago Cubs, and California Angels.

== Early life and education ==
Simmons was born in Whitehall Township, Pennsylvania, in the Lehigh Valley region of eastern Pennsylvania. He attended Whitehall High School, where he led Whitehall to three straight league titles and also led the Coplay American Legion team to two Pennsylvania state crowns.

== Major League Baseball ==
=== Philadelphia Phillies ===
In 1947, then Philadelphia Phillies owner Bob Carpenter arranged for an exhibition match between his Phillies and a team of all-star high school players from the Lehigh Valley. The game was played on the opening day of Egypt Memorial Park, June 2, 1947, in front of a crowd of 4,500. Simmons started for the high school team and struck out eleven Phillies as the game ended in a 4–4 tie (a late-game error was the only thing that prevented the high school team from winning). The 5 ft 11 in (1.80 m), 175 lb (79 kg) lefty was signed by the Phillies, and awarded a $65,000 signing bonus, one of the highest ever awarded at that time. That spring, Simmons also pitched and played outfield in an All-American high school game between teams managed by Babe Ruth and Ty Cobb.

In 1949, Simmons returned to the Lehigh Valley, pitching for the Phillies in an exhibition match against the Allentown Redbirds, in front of a record crowd of 4,590 at Breadon Field in Whitehall Township.

In the 1950 season, Simmons won 17 of 25 decisions, playing an instrumental role in bringing the Phillies their second National League championship of the 20th century.

With the outbreak of the Korean War, however, Simmons was called to active military service in September 1950. The Phillies managed to hold off the Brooklyn Dodgers in the 1950 season's final contest on Dick Sisler's 10th-inning home run to win the National League again Simmons was stationed at Camp Atterbury and requested and was granted leave on October 4, 1950, to attend the Series. The Phillies chose not to request that the Commissioner of Baseball Happy Chandler rule Simmons eligible for the World Series, but Simmons attended it in support of the team. Simmons' place on the World Series roster was taken by pitcher Jocko Thompson. Without Simmons, the Phillies were swept in four games by Joe DiMaggio and the New York Yankees.

Simmons missed the entire 1951 season while stationed in Korea with the military, but he returned in the 1952 season, winning 14 games, posting a 2.82 earned run average (ERA), and leading Major League Baseball with six shutouts. But the Phillies would never again contend for a championship during his tenure in Philadelphia, although Simmons continued to pitch with the Phillies into the late 1950s.

=== St. Louis Cardinals ===
In 1959, he was struck with a sore arm. In 1960, the Philadelphia Phillies, then in last place and in rebuilding mode, released Simmons on May 17, 1960, after four mound appearances. Simmons signed as a free agent with the St. Louis Cardinals three days later, and began a comeback that culminated in 15- and 18-game-winning seasons in 1963 and 1964, respectively, while in a pitching rotation that included Bob Gibson and Ray Sadecki. In 1964, he appeared in the World Series against the New York Yankees, starting World Series games for the world champion Cardinals, losing his only decision but compiling a 2.51 ERA.

Simmons’ last winning record was in 1964; he lost 15 games for the Cardinals in 1965.

=== Chicago Cubs and California Angels ===
Simmons finished his Major League Baseball career with the Chicago Cubs in 1966 and the California Angels in 1967.

Along with Smoky Burgess, Simmons was the last player to formally retire who had played in Major League Baseball in the 1940s not counting Minnie Miñoso, who would later twice un-retire. MLB Hall of Fame hitters Hank Aaron and Stan Musial each separately named Simmons as the toughest pitcher they had to face in their careers.

Over his two decade career in Major League Baseball, Simmons' final record was 193–183 (.515). In 569 games pitched and 3,3481/3 innings, Simmons allowed 3,313 hits and 1,063 bases on balls. He recorded 1,697 strikeouts, 163 complete games, 36 shutouts, and five saves.

== Death ==
Simmons died on December 13, 2022, in Ambler, Pennsylvania, at the age of 93. At the time of his death, Simmons was the last Philadelphia Phillies player from the 1940s, and the last living member of the 1950 Phillies National League pennant winning team, nicknamed the Whiz Kids because of the team's youth.

Of note, actress and model Lili Simmons is his granddaughter.
