= Johnny Keane =

American baseball manager (1911–1967)

- Keane, c. 1964
- Manager
- Born: November 3, 1911; St. Louis, Missouri, U.S.
- Died: January 6, 1967 (aged 55); Houston, Texas, U.S.

Career statistics
- Games managed: 749
- Win–loss record: 398–350
- Winning %: .532
- Stats at Baseball Reference
- Managerial record at Baseball Reference

Teams
- As manager: St. Louis Cardinals (1961–1964); New York Yankees (1965–1966); As coach: St. Louis Cardinals (1959–1961)

Career highlights and awards
- World Series champion (1964)

John Joseph Keane (November 3, 1911 – January 6, 1967) was an American professional baseball manager and coach. He managed in Major League Baseball (MLB) for four complete seasons and parts of two others. Keane is perhaps best remembered for his change of teams following the 1964 MLB season—after the St. Louis Cardinals defeated the New York Yankees in the World Series, he unexpectedly resigned as manager of the Cardinals and was subsequently hired to manage the Yankees.

== Playing and managing career ==
Keane never played in the major leagues; beginning in 1930, he was a shortstop in the Cardinals' minor league system but suffered a head injury in 1935 after being hit by a pitch and lay in a coma for weeks. He began his managing career in 1938 in the Cardinals' organization, working his way from Class D (then the lowest rung on the ladder, equivalent to a Rookie-level team today) to Triple-A, where he spent a decade as manager of top St. Louis farm clubs. His career win–loss record as a manager in the minor leagues was 1,357–1,166 (.538) over 17 seasons.

Keane finally reached the majors in 1959, when he was named the Cardinals' third-base coach. He replaced Solly Hemus as manager on July 6, 1961. In his 3 1/2 seasons as Cardinal pilot, he compiled a record of 317–249 (.560) and his crucial, positive role in mentoring young Cardinal players, especially star pitcher Bob Gibson, is chronicled in the David Halberstam book October 1964.

=== 1964: Triumph amid turmoil ===
In August 1964, with Cardinals seemingly out of the race, team owner August "Gussie" Busch became convinced (possibly by Branch Rickey, whom he had hired as a consultant) that only a thorough housecleaning of Cardinal management would bring him the pennant he had craved since he bought the team in 1953. On August 17, he fired (or accepted the resignations of) almost every senior St. Louis front office executive. Keane was temporarily spared, but Busch was secretly negotiating with Leo Durocher (then a coach for the Los Angeles Dodgers) to become manager at the close of the 1964 season.

However, in the last two weeks of the season, the front-running Philadelphia Phillies — who had seemed a lock for the pennant — unexpectedly began to unravel while both the Cardinals and Cincinnati Reds got hot. The Phillies lost ten straight games, creating a four-team scramble for the National League pennant, involving the Phils, Cards, Reds and San Francisco Giants. Philadelphia came to St. Louis after losing seven straight at home and were swept by the Cardinals, who notched their eighth straight win and moved into first place at 92–67, with a three-game series at home with the lowly New York Mets (51–108) remaining. The Cardinals lost the first two, which dropped them into a tie with Cincinnati, one ahead of Philadelphia. On the final day of the regular season on Sunday, October 4, the Phillies blanked the Reds 10–0 and the Cardinals took the Mets 11–5 to avoid a three-way playoff and clinched their first NL pennant since 1946; they then defeated the New York Yankees in a seven-game World Series.

After winning the World Series on October 15, the Cardinals held a press conference the next day. Most expected that the team would formally announce a contract extension for Keane. Instead, Keane handed owner Busch and new general manager Bob Howsam (Bing Devine had been fired as GM on August 17) a surprise letter of resignation that he had written late in September, at the height of the pennant chase. The Cardinals then bypassed Durocher entirely and instead hired longtime fan favorite Red Schoendienst, a Hall of Fame second baseman and one of Keane's coaches, as the club's new manager.

=== Manager of 1965 Yankees ===
Shortly after his resignation, Keane became the surprise new manager of the Yankees on October 20, who reassigned first-year manager Yogi Berra on October 16, the day after the World Series. It was later revealed that the Yankees had made an informal inquiry about Keane's interest in the job during the 1964 season.

The Keane-Yankees pairing was not a good match; while the Yankees were coming off five straight American League pennants and 15 league championships in 18 years, the 1965 team was on a downhill slide. The circumstances of Keane's hiring caused a significant credibility gap with the players, and his aloof, distant manner did little to help. His style was better suited to young players, rather than a veteran-laden roster like the Yankees. His first team finished in sixth place at 77–85 (.475), their first losing season in forty years, and 25 games behind the Minnesota Twins. Keane and Yogi Berra, whom he replaced, were invited to attend the 1965 Major League Baseball All-Star Game as guests of Twins owner Calvin Griffith.

When the 1966 version won only four of their first 20 games, Keane became the first Yankee manager to be fired in midseason since 1910. Prior to their game at California on Saturday, May 7, he was replaced by Ralph Houk, the team's general manager, who had managed the team from 1961 to 1963. The Yankees did not respond to Houk either and finished 70–89 (.440) in tenth (last) place, the first time in the cellar since 1912. Keane's 81–101 (.445) record with New York gave him a career managerial mark of 398–350 (.532) over six seasons.

=== Managerial record ===
Team	Year	Regular season					Postseason			
Team	Year	Games	Won	Lost	Win %	Finish	Won	Lost	Win %	Result
STL	1961	80	47	33	.588	5th in NL	–	–	–	–
STL	1962	162	84	78	.519	6th in NL	–	–	–	–
STL	1963	162	93	69	.574	2nd in NL	–	–	–	–
STL	1964	162	93	69	.574	1st in NL	4	3	.571	Won World Series (NYY)
STL total		566	317	249	.560		4	3	.571	
NYY	1965	162	77	85	.475	6th in AL	–	–	–	–
NYY	1966	20	4	16	.200	fired	–	–	–	–
NYY total		182	81	101	.445		0	0	–	
Total		748	398	350	.532		4	3	.571	

== Post-managerial career ==
Keane is described in Jim Bouton's Ball Four as being prone to panic, and someone who was "willing to sacrifice a season to win a game" by putting injured stars into the lineup before their injuries had fully healed. Bouton tells a humorous anecdote of Keane pressuring Mickey Mantle to play on a bad leg. But in Keane's defense, Bouton also noted that general manager Houk and the team unfairly used Keane as the excuse for their losing records in 1965 and 1966, which were actually the result of an aging team with a depleted farm system.

== Death ==
In December 1966, Keane accepted a scouting post with the California Angels. He suffered a fatal heart attack one month later at age 55 at his home in Houston, Texas. Keane had lived in Houston since his days as player and (later) manager for the Cardinals' longtime Texas League farm team, the Houston Buffaloes.

In Bouton's book I Managed Good, But Boy Did They Play Bad, a collection of essays and stories about past Major League managers, he wrote that Keane seemed to be in awe of the Yankees, and that he underestimated the problems the team faced. Bouton felt that the immense pressure and stress of managing the Yankees through their inevitable collapse likely led to his death.

== See also ==
- List of St. Louis Cardinals managers
- List of St. Louis Cardinals coaches

Preceded by League inactive during World War II	Houston Buffaloes manager 1946–1948	Succeeded by Del Wilber
Preceded by Cedric Durst	Rochester Red Wings manager 1949–1951	Succeeded by Harry Walker
Preceded by Harry Walker	Columbus Red Birds manager 1952–1954	Succeeded by Franchise transferred
Preceded by Franchise established	Omaha Cardinals manager 1955–1958	Succeeded by Joe Schultz
Preceded by Stan Hack	St. Louis Cardinals third base coach 1959–1961	Succeeded by Vern Benson
