= Dal Maxvill =

American baseball player and coach (born 1939)

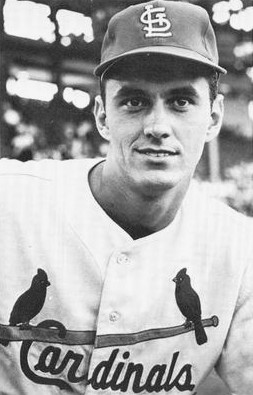
- Maxvill in 1965
- Shortstop
- Born: February 18, 1939 (age 87); Granite City, Illinois, U.S.
- Batted: Right Threw: Right

MLB debut
- June 10, 1962, for the St. Louis Cardinals

Last MLB appearance
- September 28, 1975, for the Oakland Athletics

MLB statistics
- Batting average: .217
- Home runs: 6
- Runs batted in: 252
- Stats at Baseball Reference

Teams
- St. Louis Cardinals (1962–1972); Oakland Athletics (1972–1973); Pittsburgh Pirates (1973–1974); Oakland Athletics (1974–1975)

Career highlights and awards
- 4× World Series champion (1964, 1967, 1972, 1974); Gold Glove Award (1968)

Charles Dallan Maxvill (born February 18, 1939) is an American former shortstop, coach, and general manager in Major League Baseball (MLB). During his career, Maxvill played, coached, or was an executive for four World Series winners and seven league champions.

== Early life ==
A native of the St. Louis suburb of Granite City, Illinois, Maxvill played baseball in high school, then attended the McKelvey School of Engineering at Washington University in St. Louis where he earned a degree in electrical engineering and played for Washington University Bears. He signed his first professional baseball contract in 1960 with the hometown St. Louis Cardinals.

== Playing career ==
Maxvill appeared in 1,423 regular-season games for the Cardinals (1962–1972), Oakland Athletics (1972–73; 1974–75) and Pittsburgh Pirates (1973–74). He batted and threw right-handed. He batted .217 with six home runs in 3,989 plate appearances over his 14-year major league career.

Defensively, Maxvill recorded a .973 fielding percentage at shortstop in 1,203 games and .984 fielding percentage at second base in 193 games. In the postseason, he committed no errors in 101 total chances (46 putouts, 55 assists) for a perfect 1.000 fielding percentage.

Maxvill's best season with the bat was 1968 with the Cardinals. He set career highs in batting average (.253), on-base percentage (.329), and slugging percentage (.298). He also received his only Most Valuable Player award votes (finishing in twentieth place) and won his only Gold Glove. In that year's World Series (the last of the pre-LCS era), he went 0-for-22, the worst batting performance in a World Series. It was also the worst hitless streak to start a postseason until 2022.

Maxvill holds the National League record for fewest hits for a batter playing in at least 150 games. He had 80 hits in 1970 in 399 at-bats in 152 games, just barely over the Mendoza Line at .201. (The Sporting News Baseball Record, 2007, p. 19)

After batting .221 in 105 games during the first 4 1/2 months of the campaign, he was acquired by the Oakland Athletics from the Cardinals for minor-league third baseman Joe Lindsey on August 30, 1972. The deal occurring one day prior to the waiver trade deadline meant that he was eligible to be on the A's roster for its postseason run. Minor-league catcher Gene Dusan was also sent to the Cardinals to complete the transaction two months later on October 27.

== Coaching and executive career ==
In November 1975, Maxvill officially retired from playing baseball. His first coaching job came from Joe Torre who hired him to work as the third base coach for the New York Mets in 1978. After the 1978 season, Maxvill resigned to be closer to his St. Louis home and the Cardinals hired him as a coach for the 1979 and 1980 seasons. In 1981, Maxvill worked as a minor league instructor for the Cardinals when new manager Whitey Herzog brought in his own coaches.

Torre hired Maxvill again in 1982 when Torre took over the Atlanta Braves. Maxvill worked with Atlanta through the 1984 season. In January 1985, the St. Louis Cardinals came to Maxvill again, this time to serve as general manager over Whitey Herzog.

The 1987 season was the last time one of Maxvill's teams made the playoffs. The Cardinals finished above .500 in 1989, 1991, 1992, and 1993, but their best finish was 2nd place. Owner and president August Gussie Busch died in September 1989 and Anheuser-Busch took over operations of the team.

Changes within the top levels in the organization continued to the point that most remnants of the Busch era turned over. The next season, longtime manager Whitey Herzog resigned and Torre was hired in his place. However, the brewery did not appear as invested as Busch in making the Cardinals a winning team and began looking to sell the team. As a result, after new president Mark Lamping was hired in 1994, he sought to make changes to attempt to build a winner. Three weeks after Lamping's hire, he fired Maxvill. The next year, Anheuser-Busch sold the team to an investment group led by Fred Hanser, Drew Baur and William DeWitt, Jr. Maxvill pursued no further baseball opportunities, citing the desire to spend more time with his family.

Preceded by Joe McDonald	St. Louis Cardinals General manager 1984–1994	Succeeded by Walt Jocketty
