= 1964 World Series =

61st edition of Major League Baseball's championship series

Team (Wins)	Managers	Season
St. Louis Cardinals (4)	Johnny Keane	93–69, .574, GA: 1
New York Yankees (3)	Yogi Berra	99–63, .611, GA: 1
- Dates: October 7–15
- Venue(s): Busch Stadium (St. Louis); Yankee Stadium (New York)
- MVP: Bob Gibson (St. Louis)
- Umpires: Frank Secory (NL), Bill McKinley (AL), Ken Burkhart (NL), Hank Soar (AL), Vinnie Smith (NL), Al Smith (AL)
- Hall of Famers: Cardinals: Lou Brock; Bob Gibson; Yankees: Yogi Berra (manager); Whitey Ford; Mickey Mantle

Broadcast
- Television: NBC
- TV announcers: Harry Caray and Curt Gowdy (in St. Louis); Phil Rizzuto and Joe Garagiola (in New York)
- Radio: NBC
- Radio announcers: Joe Garagiola and Phil Rizzuto (in St. Louis); Curt Gowdy and Harry Caray (in New York)

The 1964 World Series was the championship series of Major League Baseball's (MLB) 1964 season. The 61st edition of the World Series, it was a best-of-seven playoff that matched the National League (NL) champion St. Louis Cardinals against the American League (AL) champion New York Yankees; the Cardinals prevailed in seven games. St. Louis won their seventh world championship, while the Yankees, who had appeared in 15 of 18 World Series since 1947, did not play in the Series again until 1976.

In an unusual twist, the Yankees fired Yogi Berra after the Series ended, replacing him with Johnny Keane, who had resigned from the Cardinals after the Series. His job had been threatened by Cardinals management, and it was unexpectedly saved by the Cardinals' dramatic pennant drive.

This is also the most recent World Series that matched the Yankees up against the Cardinals; in the previous four meetings, each team had won twice, with the Yankees winning in 1928 and 1943, and the Cardinals in 1926 and 1942. This was the first World Series to feature a team with the players' last names on the uniforms (St. Louis). This was also the first fall classic on TV to feature the then-new technology of instant replay.

This pennant for the Yankees concluded their remarkable run of 15 World Series appearances over 18 years. In total, they won 29 American League championships in the 44-year span from 1921 through 1964.

== Background ==
The 1964 World Series, and the season leading up to it, later became the subject for the David Halberstam New York Times bestseller October 1964. The Series is seen as a bellwether point in baseball history as it was the last hurrah for the 1950s Yankee Dynasty of Mantle, Maris, Ford and Berra, among others, and it demonstrated that the National League's growing enthusiasm to sign black and Latino players (such as those of the '64 Cardinals) was a permanent paradigm shift in fielding a championship team.

The Series featured the brother-against-brother match-up of Ken Boyer of the Cardinals and Clete Boyer of the Yankees, both of whom started at third base for their respective teams.

For the first time in Series history, all six umpires rotated through their positions. In all Series from 1947 through 1963, only the four infield umpires had rotated, with the last two umpires working only in the outfield throughout the Series.

Mickey Mantle, playing in his last Series, hit three home runs, raising his total to a record-setting 18, surpassing Babe Ruth's mark of 15.

Utility infielder Chet Trail, who had no prior major league experience, appeared on the Yankees' World Series roster to fill the opening created by an injury to Tony Kubek. Trail did not play in the series (Phil Linz played in place of Kubek), and Trail never appeared in a major league game during his career.

Both Berra and Keane were St. Louis natives, though neither had ever played for the hometown Cardinals; Berra's entire playing career was spent in New York, while Keane played in the Cardinals' farm system but never reached the major leagues as a player.

=== Yankees ===
After winning the American League pennant in 1963, the Yankees faced strong challenges from the pitching-rich Chicago White Sox and up-and-coming Baltimore Orioles in 1964. On August 22, the Yankees were in third place, 5 1/2 games out of first. Led by recently called up pitcher Mel Stottlemyre (who went 9–3), and helped by the post trade deadline acquisition of relief pitcher Pedro Ramos (2–0 with seven saves for New York) from Cleveland, the Yankees went 27–8 to take a 3 1/2 game lead with five to play. After losing two games in Detroit, the Yankees clinched the pennant on the next-to-last day of the season with an 8–3 win over the Indians.

=== Cardinals ===
The Cardinals were coming off a second-place finish in 1963, and their road to the World Series was even more dramatic than that of the Yankees. After a season-long four-way race among the Cardinals, San Francisco Giants, Philadelphia Phillies, and Cincinnati Reds, the Phillies appeared to have the pennant in hand as they built a 6 1/2 game lead with 12 games to play. But they proceeded to lose 10 straight games. With two games remaining, four teams still had a mathematical chance to win the pennant. The Giants were the first to be eliminated when they lost on October 3 to the Cubs, 10–7. The Cardinals lost to the lowly Mets, 15–5, while the Phillies ended their 10-game losing streak with a 4–3 win over the Reds. Going into the last day of the season, the Cardinals and Reds were tied for first and the Phillies were one game back; the Phillies hoped to force the first three-way tie in major league history by defeating the Reds and hoping the Mets would beat the Cardinals. The Phillies did their part by defeating the Reds, 10–0, but the Cardinals overcame an early 3–2 deficit and beat the Mets, 11–5, to win the pennant.

During the season, the Cardinals would be involved in the Lou Brock-for-Ernie Broglio trade, later considered one of the more lopsided trades in baseball history.

== Summary ==
NL St. Louis Cardinals (4) vs. AL New York Yankees (3)

Game	Date	Score	Location	Time	Attendance
1	October 7	New York Yankees – 5, St. Louis Cardinals – 9	Busch Stadium	2:42	30,805
2	October 8	New York Yankees – 8, St. Louis Cardinals – 3	Busch Stadium	2:29	30,805
3	October 10	St. Louis Cardinals – 1, New York Yankees – 2	Yankee Stadium	2:16	67,101
4	October 11	St. Louis Cardinals – 4, New York Yankees – 3	Yankee Stadium	2:18	66,312
5	October 12	St. Louis Cardinals – 5, New York Yankees – 2 (10)	Yankee Stadium	2:37	65,633
6	October 14	New York Yankees – 8, St. Louis Cardinals – 3	Busch Stadium	2:37	30,805
7	October 15	New York Yankees – 5, St. Louis Cardinals – 7	Busch Stadium	2:40	30,346

== Matchups ==
=== Game 1 ===
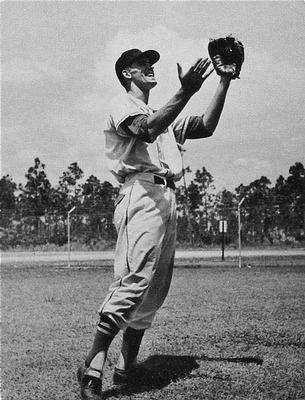
Mike Shannon

Wednesday, October 7, 1964 1:00 pm (CT) at Busch Stadium in St. Louis, Missouri
Team	1	2	3	4	5	6	7	8	9	R	H	E
New York	0	3	0	0	1	0	0	1	0	5	12	2
St. Louis	1	1	0	0	0	4	0	3	X	9	12	0
WP: Ray Sadecki (1–0) LP: Whitey Ford (0–1) Sv: Barney Schultz (1); Home runs: NYY: Tom Tresh (1); STL: Mike Shannon (1)

The Cardinals' scouting report indicated that injuries had taken their toll on Mickey Mantle's defense and that he could be run on. They acted on this intelligence, taking extra bases repeatedly and scoring from second on singles in the second and sixth innings. The Cardinals also believed that they should swing early in the count against Whitey Ford, and this strategy also paid off, as Ray Sadecki, Carl Warwick, and Mike Shannon all drove in runs on the first or second pitches of their at-bats.

The Cardinals struck first in the bottom of the first off Whitey Ford on Ken Boyer's sacrifice fly after two one-out singles, but Tom Tresh's two-run home run after a single off Ray Sadecki put the Yankees up 2–1 in the second. They made it 3–1 when Clete Boyer singled, stole second, and scored on Ford's single. The Cardinals cut the lead to 3–2 in the bottom of the inning when Mike Shannon hit a leadoff single, moved to second on a groundout, and scored on Sadecki's single. Tresh's RBI double in the fifth after two two-out singles made it 4–2 Yankees, but the Cardinals sent eight men to the plate in the sixth inning. Shannon's home run after a single tied the game, then after Tim McCarver doubled, Al Downing relieved Ford and allowed a two-out RBI single to Carl Warwick and a single to Curt Flood to put the Cardinals up 6–4. The Yankees cut the lead to one in the eighth when Johnny Blanchard doubled and scored on Bobby Richardson's single off Barney Schultz, but the Cardinals padded their lead in the bottom half, loading the bases off Rollie Sheldon on two walks and an error, then Flood's RBI single and Lou Brock's two-run double off Pete Mikkelsen put them up 9–5. Schultz retired the Yankees in order in the ninth for the save. Ford pitched with severe pain and numbness in his arm for much of the 1964 season, and that day he was again in pain and missing with sliders inside. Shannon came up looking for sliders and hit one 500 feet. This was the last World Series appearance by Ford, whose shoulder had been injured during the season. Ford had pitched in 22 World Series games with the Yankees, compiling ten victories, going back to the sweep of the Philadelphia Phillies in 1950, and set a record which still stands by pitching 33 2/3 consecutive scoreless innings across three different World Series (1960–62).

=== Game 2 ===
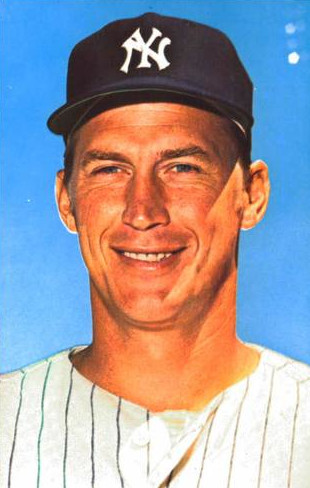
Mel Stottlemyre

Thursday, October 8, 1964 1:00 pm (CT) at Busch Stadium in St. Louis, Missouri
Team	1	2	3	4	5	6	7	8	9	R	H	E
New York	0	0	0	1	0	1	2	0	4	8	12	0
St. Louis	0	0	1	0	0	0	0	1	1	3	7	0
WP: Mel Stottlemyre (1–0) LP: Bob Gibson (0–1); Home runs: NYY: Phil Linz (1); STL: None

Rookie Mel Stottlemyre, called up from the minors in August, dominated for New York and the Cardinal bullpen wilted in the late innings. The Cardinals struck first in the third on Curt Flood's groundout with runners on second and third, but the Yankees tied the game in the fourth on Clete Boyer's bases-loaded sacrifice fly off Bob Gibson. After a walk and hit-by-pitch in the sixth, Tom Tresh's RBI single put the Yankees up 2–1. Next inning, Phil Linz hit a leadoff single, moved to third on a wild pitch, and scored on Bobby Richardson's single. After moving to third on a single, Richardson scored on Mickey Mantle's groundout. Lou Brock's groundout in the eighth with runners on second and third shaved the lead to 4–2, but the Yankees blew the game open in the ninth. Linz's leadoff home run off Barney Schultz made it 5–2 Yankees. After a one-out single, Gordie Richardson relieved Schultz and allowed an RBI double to Mantle. After an intentional walk, Joe Pepitone's RBI single and Tresh's sacrifice fly made it 8–2 Yankees. The Cardinals got a run in the bottom half when Dick Groat hit a leadoff triple and scored on Tim McCarver's single, but Stottlemyre retired the next two hitters to end the game as the Yankees' 8–3 win tied the series heading to New York.

=== Game 3 ===
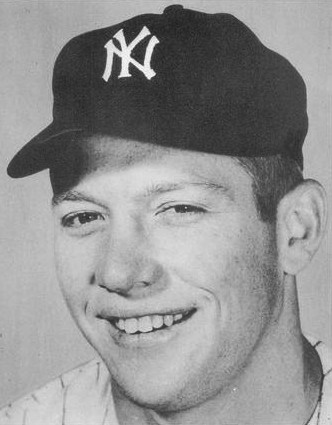
Mickey Mantle

Saturday, October 10, 1964 1:00 pm (ET) at Yankee Stadium in Bronx, New York
Team	1	2	3	4	5	6	7	8	9	R	H	E
St. Louis	0	0	0	0	1	0	0	0	0	1	6	0
New York	0	1	0	0	0	0	0	0	1	2	5	2
WP: Jim Bouton (1–0) LP: Barney Schultz (0–1); Home runs: STL: None; NYY: Mickey Mantle (1)

Curt Simmons and Jim Bouton were both very effective. Simmons got 17 ground-ball outs. The Yankees scored a run in the second on Clete Boyer's RBI double with two on, but Simmons's RBI single tied the game in the fifth. Bouton stranded the go-ahead run four times and held the top five hitters in the Cardinal lineup to a 2 for 21 day.

In the bottom of the ninth, Mickey Mantle reached deep for one of the last ounces of Yankees magic. With the game tied at one, Mantle, the leadoff hitter, told on-deck hitter Elston Howard to go back to the clubhouse because he was going to hit a home run. Mantle swung at the first pitch from Barney Schultz, a knuckleball that failed to move, and hit it into the right field stands to win the game for the Yankees. Schultz had been a mainstay of the Cardinals' stretch run and Yankee scouting reports had advised that his knuckler was most vulnerable on the first pitch when he threw harder than usual to try for a strike. Mantle's home run (his 16th Series home run) broke Babe Ruth's record for most home runs hit in World Series play.

=== Game 4 ===
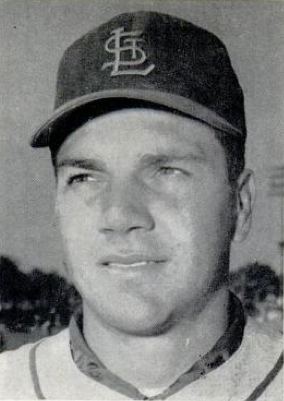
Ken Boyer

Sunday, October 11, 1964 1:00 pm (ET) at Yankee Stadium in Bronx, New York
Team	1	2	3	4	5	6	7	8	9	R	H	E
St. Louis	0	0	0	0	0	4	0	0	0	4	6	1
New York	3	0	0	0	0	0	0	0	0	3	6	1
WP: Roger Craig (1–0) LP: Al Downing (0–1) Sv: Ron Taylor (1); Home runs: STL: Ken Boyer (1); NYY: None

Cardinal starting pitcher Ray Sadecki let the first four Yankees hit safely. After a leadoff double by Phil Linz, Bobby Richardson's RBI double put the Yankees up 1–0. After a single, Mickey Mantle's RBI single made it 2–0 and Sadecki was promptly removed by manager Keane. Roger Craig came in to pitch and gave up an RBI single to Elston Howard but allowed no more damage. After five innings, New York was still up 3–0 and St. Louis had only one hit off Downing.

The turning point of the game — and the Series — came in the top of the sixth. Carl Warwick led off with his third pinch-hit base hit, tying a World Series record. Curt Flood singled to put runners on first and second. After Lou Brock flied out, Dick Groat reached base on a slow roller that was bobbled by Yankee second baseman Bobby Richardson. Instead of runners on second and third with two out, the bases were loaded with one out.

In the first game, Yankee Al Downing struck Cardinal Ken Boyer out with a high changeup. Downing faced Boyer again with the bases loaded, and Boyer guessed that he'd see the high changeup again. He guessed right, and hit a grand-slam. Ron Taylor relieved Craig and gave up one hit over the last four innings. St. Louis won the game 4–3; instead of trailing three games to one, Boyer's grand slam enabled the Cardinals to even the Series at two games apiece and guaranteed a return to St. Louis.

=== Game 5 ===
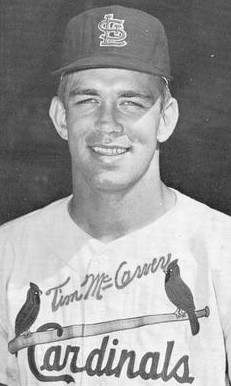
Tim McCarver

Monday, October 12, 1964 1:00 pm (ET) at Yankee Stadium in Bronx, New York
Team	1	2	3	4	5	6	7	8	9	10	R	H	E
St. Louis	0	0	0	0	2	0	0	0	0	3	5	10	1
New York	0	0	0	0	0	0	0	0	2	0	2	6	2
WP: Bob Gibson (1–1) LP: Pete Mikkelsen (0–1); Home runs: STL: Tim McCarver (1); NYY: Tom Tresh (2)

The game was scoreless in the top of the fifth inning when the Cardinals plated two. Pitcher Bob Gibson led off the inning with a single. Center fielder Curt Flood hit a grounder to second base that Bobby Richardson fumbled. Instead of a potential double play, the Cardinals had two runners on. Lou Brock, hitless in his previous 14 at bats, singled in Gibson. Flood scored on a Bill White ground out after Phil Linz made another misplay, throwing a ball into the dirt at first on what should have been the back end of a double play.

The Yankees were still down 2–0 when they rallied in the ninth inning. Mantle reached base on an error by Dick Groat. With one out and one on, Joe Pepitone smashed a bouncer off Bob Gibson's leg, the ball ricocheting towards the third-base line. Gibson recovered quickly and threw to first, and the Cardinals were one out away. With two out, though, Tom Tresh crushed a long drive into the right center field bleachers and the game was tied. The game went to extra innings, and it was the Cardinals who seized the initiative. With two on and one out and lefty hitter Tim McCarver up, Berra stuck with right-hander Pete Mikkelsen rather than using lefty specialist Steve Hamilton. McCarver delivered a three-run home run in the tenth inning to send the Cardinals back to St. Louis with a 3–2 lead in the series. Just 22 years old at the time, McCarver would go 11–for–23 (.478) in the series. For his entire career McCarver would hit .271. This was the last postseason game at Yankee Stadium before its renovation following the 1973 season. This was also the Cardinals last road win against the Yankees until August 31, 2024.

=== Game 6 ===
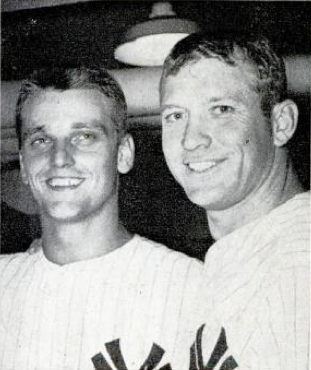
Roger Maris (left) and Mickey Mantle (right)

Wednesday, October 14, 1964 1:00 pm (CT) at Busch Stadium in St. Louis, Missouri
Team	1	2	3	4	5	6	7	8	9	R	H	E
New York	0	0	0	0	1	2	0	5	0	8	10	0
St. Louis	1	0	0	0	0	0	0	1	1	3	10	1
WP: Jim Bouton (2–0) LP: Curt Simmons (0–1) Sv: Steve Hamilton (1); Home runs: NYY: Roger Maris (1), Mickey Mantle (2), Joe Pepitone (1); STL: None

The Cardinals struck first in Game 6 on Bill White's double play with runners on first and third in the first off Jim Bouton, but the Yankees tied the score in the fifth when Tom Tresh hit a leadoff double and scored on Bouton's two-out single off Curt Simmons. Back-to-back home runs by Roger Maris and Mickey Mantle put the Yankees up 3–1 in the sixth before they blew the game open in the eighth. With two on and two outs off Barney Schultz, Elston Howard's RBI single made it 4–1 Yankees. After a walk loaded the bases, Gordie Richardson relieved Schultz and allowed a grand slam to Joe Pepitone to put the Yankees up 8–1. The Cardinals scored a run in the bottom of the inning on Bill White's RBI groundout with runners on second and third and no out, then in the ninth, Bob Skinner hit an RBI single with two on off Steve Hamilton (the run charged to Bouton) before Curt Flood hit into the game-ending double play. The Yankees' 8–3 win forced a deciding Game 7.

=== Game 7 ===
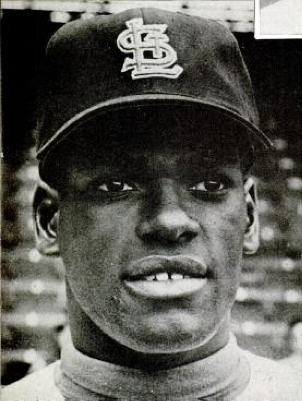
Bob Gibson

Thursday, October 15, 1964 1:00 pm (CT) at Busch Stadium in St. Louis, Missouri
Team	1	2	3	4	5	6	7	8	9	R	H	E
New York	0	0	0	0	0	3	0	0	2	5	9	2
St. Louis	0	0	0	3	3	0	1	0	X	7	10	1
WP: Bob Gibson (2–1) LP: Mel Stottlemyre (1–1); Home runs: NYY: Mickey Mantle (3), Clete Boyer (1), Phil Linz (2); STL: Lou Brock (1), Ken Boyer (2)

"Something had to give" in Game 7, as the Yankees had lost back-to-back World Series only once (to the New York Giants in 1921–22), and were in danger of doing so again, having lost to the Dodgers in 1963; and the Cardinals had never lost a World Series Game 7.

Bob Gibson pitched his third start in this Series on two days rest. He was tired but deliberately worked fast to hide his fatigue from the Yankees. In the bottom of the fourth the Cardinals scored three times. Again the Yankees botched a double play when Linz's throw to first went wide, and Bill White scored. McCarver then scored from third on a double steal. Al Downing came in for the fifth after Stottlemyre developed shoulder stiffness, and Lou Brock hit his first pitch for a home run. Two more runs made it 6–0 and gave Gibson all the runs he needed.

Mantle cut the gap in half with a three-run homer in the sixth, adding to his own record for total home runs in the World Series. Ken Boyer responded with a home run in the seventh that pushed the lead to 7–3. Bobby Richardson broke a World Series hit record in the seventh with his 13th hit, later tied by Brock in 1968 and Marty Barrett in 1986. Gibson continued to tire, but manager Keane left him in. Ken Boyer's brother Clete hit a home run for New York with one out in the ninth, making the score 7–4. Pinch-hitter Johnny Blanchard struck out. Linz hit another home run, pulling New York to within two, 7–5, but the next batter, Richardson, popped up to second baseman Dal Maxvill and the Cardinals won the Series.

Bob Gibson won the Series MVP award for his 2–1 record, 3.00 ERA, and 31 strikeouts in 27 innings pitched. Jim Bouton, pitching for the Yankees, started two games and won them both, compiling a 1.56 Series ERA. Six years later, he would write the classic baseball memoir, Ball Four. After the series, the Yankees fired manager Yogi Berra and replaced him with the Cardinal manager, Keane, who quit St. Louis due to his differences with Cardinal owner Gussie Busch. Yogi Berra would go on to join the New York Mets, the following season and be re-united with Casey Stengel as a player/coach.

Tim McCarver (who finished second in MVP voting to Gibson) batted .478 in the series and recorded 11 hits, 5 RBIs and a home run and scored 4 runs.

The 1964 Cardinals were the only team between 1962 and 1972 to win the World Series when owning home-field advantage.

Game 7 was the last postseason game to be played at the first Busch Stadium, and the last such game to be played in St. Louis until 1967 (at Busch Memorial Stadium, which opened during the previous season), when the Cardinals defeated the Boston Red Sox to win their next world championship. The first non-World Series postseason games to be played in St. Louis occurred in 1982, when the Cardinals defeated the Atlanta Braves in the NLCS and the then-American League Milwaukee Brewers in the World Series. The Cardinals also ended their first season at the current Busch Stadium with a World Series win over the Detroit Tigers in 2006; the Yankees (then in their first season at the current Yankee Stadium) did the same thing in 2009 by defeating the Philadelphia Phillies in that year's World Series.

== Aftermath ==
After appearing in 15 World Series (winning ten) in the 18 seasons from 1947 to 1964, the Yankees went into decline as many of their stars either moved on to other teams or retired. They would eventually return to the World Series again in 1976, but were swept by the Cincinnati Reds. They would win their next championship in 1977 over their old rival in the Los Angeles Dodgers in six games.

The Cardinals would win their next championship in 1967 over the Boston Red Sox in seven games despite surrendering a 3–1 series lead.

== Composite box ==
1964 World Series (4–3): St. Louis Cardinals (N.L.) over New York Yankees (A.L.)

Team	1	2	3	4	5	6	7	8	9	10	R	H	E
St. Louis Cardinals	2	1	1	3	6	8	1	5	2	3	32	61	4
New York Yankees	3	4	0	1	2	6	2	6	9	0	33	60	9
Total attendance: 321,807 Average attendance: 45,972; Winning player's share: $8,622 Losing player's share: $5,309

== See also ==
- 1964 Japan Series
