= 1964 Chicago Cubs season =

1964 Chicago Cubs
- League: National League
- Ballpark: Wrigley Field
- City: Chicago
- Record: 76–86 (.469)
- League place: 8th
- Owners: Philip K. Wrigley
- General managers: John Holland
- Managers: Bob Kennedy
- Television: WGN-TV (Jack Brickhouse, Vince Lloyd)
- Radio: WGN (Jack Quinlan, Lou Boudreau)

The 1964 Chicago Cubs season was the 93rd season of the Chicago Cubs franchise, the 89th in the National League and the 49th at Wrigley Field. The Cubs finished eighth in the National League with a record of 76–86, 17 games behind the NL and World Series champion St. Louis Cardinals.

== Offseason ==
On February 13, Ken Hubbs, who had been the Cubs starting second baseman in 1963, was killed in a plane crash. He was replaced by Joey Amalfitano, who was acquired from the San Francisco Giants a few weeks later.

=== Notable transactions ===
- December 2, 1963: Byron Browne was drafted by the Cubs from the Pittsburgh Pirates in the 1963 first-year draft.
- March 29, 1964: Joey Amalfitano was purchased by the Cubs from the San Francisco Giants.
- Prior to 1964 season: Dick LeMay was traded by the Cubs to the St. Louis Cardinals for Lee Gregory.

== Regular season ==
On June 15, the Cubs made one of the most infamous deals in baseball history, remembered today simply as "Brock for Broglio". There were six players involved in all, but the most prominent players involved were pitcher Ernie Broglio, who came to the Cubs from the St. Louis Cardinals, and outfielder Lou Brock, who went to the Cardinals from the Cubs. While Broglio was a serviceable starter for the rest of 1964, he would post ERAs over 6 in each of the next two seasons, and was out of baseball altogether by the end of 1967. Brock went on to star for the Cardinals for the next fifteen years, and eventually be elected to the Hall of Fame. It is to this day often held up as an example of a lopsided trade outcome.

The Cubs in 1963 had been a team that had arrived, finishing over .500 for the first time since 1946.

They had a great nucleus with Hubbs, Ron Santo, Billy Williams, Ernie Banks, pitchers Dick Ellsworth and Larry Jackson, and Brock. In 1963, the Cubs finished second in the league in ERA and second in giving up the fewest runs, earned runs, and walks.

With Hubbs on the team in 1964, it is highly unlikely the Cubs would have pushed the panic button and traded Brock. With Brock batting first, Hubbs second, followed by Williams, Santo, and Banks in 1964, the Cubs would have fielded a strong lineup, as they had in 1963.

That 1964 lineup featured three future Hall of Famers even without Hubbs and Brock. Left fielder Williams batted .312 that year with 33 homers and 98 RBI, and garnered some MVP votes. Third baseman Santo batted cleanup, with a .313 average, a major league leading 13 triples, a National League high 86 walks, and a league leading .398 on-base percentage. First baseman Banks was fifth in the lineup. He batted only .264 that year, but had 23 homers and 95 RBI.

With the cloud of Hubbs' untimely passing hanging over their heads, however, the Cubs finished ten games under .500.

=== Season standings ===
National League
Team	W	L	Pct.	GB	Home	Road
St. Louis Cardinals	93	69	.574	—	48‍–‍33	45‍–‍36
Philadelphia Phillies	92	70	.568	1	46‍–‍35	46‍–‍35
Cincinnati Reds	92	70	.568	1	47‍–‍34	45‍–‍36
San Francisco Giants	90	72	.556	3	44‍–‍37	46‍–‍35
Milwaukee Braves	88	74	.543	5	45‍–‍36	43‍–‍38
Pittsburgh Pirates	80	82	.494	13	42‍–‍39	38‍–‍43
Los Angeles Dodgers	80	82	.494	13	41‍–‍40	39‍–‍42
Chicago Cubs	76	86	.469	17	40‍–‍41	36‍–‍45
Houston Colt .45s	66	96	.407	27	41‍–‍40	25‍–‍56
New York Mets	53	109	.327	40	33‍–‍48	20‍–‍61

=== Record vs. opponents ===
1964 National League record Sources:
Team	CHC	CIN	HOU	LAD	MIL	NYM	PHI	PIT	SF	STL
Chicago	—	6–12	11–7	10–8	8–10	11–7	6–12	9–9	9–9	6–12
Cincinnati	12–6	—	12–6	14–4–1	9–9	11–7	9–9	8–10	7–11	10–8
Houston	7–11	6–12	—	7–11	12–6	9–9	5–13	5–13	7–11	8–10
Los Angeles	8–10	4–14–1	11–7	—	8–10	15–3–1	8–10	10–8	6–12	10–8
Milwaukee	10–8	9–9	6–12	10–8	—	14–4	10–8	12–6	9–9	8–10
New York	7–11	7–11	9–9	3–15–1	4–14	—	3–15	6–12	7–11	7–11
Philadelphia	12-6	9–9	13–5	10–8	8–10	15–3	—	10–8	10–8	5–13
Pittsburgh	9–9	10–8	13–5	8–10	6–12	12–6	8–10	—	8–10	6–12
San Francisco	9–9	11–7	11–7	12–6	9–9	11–7	8–10	10–8	—	9–9
St. Louis	12–6	8–10	10–8	8–10	10–8	11–7	13–5	12–6	9–9	—

=== Notable transactions ===
- May 28, 1964: Chuck Hartenstein was signed as an amateur free agent by the Cubs.
- June 3, 1964: The Cubs traded $40,000 to the Milwaukee Braves for Len Gabrielson. The Cubs completed the deal by sending Merritt Ranew to the Braves on June 8.
- June 6, 1964: Jim Qualls was signed as an amateur free agent by the Cubs.
- June 15, 1964: Lou Brock, Jack Spring, and Paul Toth were traded by the Cubs to the St. Louis Cardinals for Ernie Broglio, Doug Clemens and Bobby Shantz.
- June 19, 1964: Don Kessinger was signed as an amateur free agent by the Cubs.

=== Roster ===
1964 Chicago Cubs
Roster
Pitchers: 32 Ernie Broglio; 31 Bob Buhl; 42 Freddie Burdette; 33 Lew Burdette; 37 Dick Ellsworth; 36 Don Elston; 38 John Flavin; 28 Lee Gregory; 40 Glen Hobbie; 46 Larry Jackson; 39 Jake Jaeckel; 34 Cal Koonce; 43 Lindy McDaniel; 45 Fred Norman; 30 Wayne Schurr; 38 Dick Scott; 45 Bobby Shantz; 41 Sterling Slaughter; 33 Jack Spring; 39 Paul Toth; 34,40 Jack Warner	Catchers: 6 Dick Bertell; 7 Merritt Ranew; 8 Vic Roznovsky; 5 Jimmie Schaffer; Infielders: 17 Joey Amalfitano; 14 Ernie Banks; 22 John Boccabella; 7 Ron Campbell; 11 Don Kessinger; 18 Andre Rodgers; 10 Ron Santo; 19 Jimmy Stewart	Outfielders: 24 Lou Brock; 15 Leo Burke; 21 Ellis Burton; 27 Doug Clemens; 20 Billy Cowan; 12 Len Gabrielson; 27 Don Landrum; 20,28 Billy Ott; 26 Billy Williams; Other batters: 11 Paul Popovich	Head coach: 61 Bob Kennedy; Coaches College of Coaches

== Player stats ==
=== Batting ===
==== Starters by position ====
Note: Pos = Position; G = Games played; AB = At bats; H = Hits; Avg. = Batting average; HR = Home runs; RBI = Runs batted in

Pos	Player	G	AB	H	Avg.	HR	RBI
C	Dick Bertell	112	353	84	.238	4	35
1B	Ernie Banks	157	591	156	.264	23	95
2B	Joey Amalfitano	100	324	78	.241	4	27
3B	Ron Santo	161	592	185	.313	30	114
SS	Andre Rodgers	129	448	107	.239	12	46
LF	Billy Williams	162	645	201	.312	33	98
CF	Billy Cowan	139	497	120	.241	19	50
RF	Len Gabrielson	89	272	67	.246	5	23

==== Other batters ====
Note: G = Games played; AB = At bats; H = Hits; Avg. = Batting average; HR = Home runs; RBI = Runs batted in

Player	G	AB	H	Avg.	HR	RBI
Jimmy Stewart	132	415	105	.253	3	33
Lou Brock	52	215	54	.251	2	14
Doug Clemens	54	140	39	.279	2	12
Jimmie Schaffer	54	122	25	.205	2	9
Ellis Burton	42	105	20	.190	2	7
Leo Burke	59	103	27	.262	1	14
Ron Campbell	26	92	25	.272	1	10
Vic Roznovsky	35	76	15	.197	0	2
Billy Ott	20	39	7	.179	0	1
Merritt Ranew	16	33	3	.091	0	1
John Boccabella	9	23	9	.391	0	6
Don Kessinger	4	12	2	.167	0	0
Don Landrum	11	11	0	.000	0	0
Paul Popovich	1	1	1	1.000	0	0

=== Pitching ===
= Indicates league leader

==== Starting pitchers ====
Note: G = Games pitched; IP = Innings pitched; W = Wins; L = Losses; ERA = Earned run average; SO = Strikeouts

Player	G	IP	W	L	ERA	SO
Larry Jackson	40	297.2	24	11	3.14	148
Dick Ellsworth	37	256.2	14	18	3.75	148
Bob Buhl	36	227.2	15	14	3.83	107
Ernie Broglio	18	100.1	4	7	4.04	46

==== Other pitchers ====
Note: G = Games pitched; IP = Innings pitched; W = Wins; L = Losses; ERA = Earned run average; SO = Strikeouts

Player	G	IP	W	L	ERA	SO
Lew Burdette	28	131.0	9	9	4.88	40
Sterling Slaughter	20	51.2	2	4	5.75	32
Fred Norman	8	31.2	0	4	6.54	20
Cal Koonce	6	31.0	3	0	2.03	17
Glen Hobbie	8	27.1	0	3	7.90	14
Paul Toth	4	10.2	0	2	8.44	0
John Flavin	5	4.2	0	1	13.50	5

==== Relief pitchers ====
Note: G = Games pitched; W = Wins; L = Losses; SV = Saves; ERA = Earned run average; SO = Strikeouts

Player	G	W	L	SV	ERA	SO
Lindy McDaniel	63	1	7	16	3.88	71
Don Elston	48	2	5	1	5.30	26
Wayne Schurr	26	0	0	0	3.72	29
Bobby Shantz	20	0	1	1	5.56	12
Freddie Burdette	18	1	0	0	3.15	4
Lee Gregory	11	0	0	0	3.50	8
Jack Warner	7	0	0	0	2.89	6
Jack Spring	7	0	0	0	6.00	1
Jake Jaeckel	4	1	0	0	0.00	2
Dick Scott	3	0	0	0	12.46	1

== Awards and honors ==
- Ron Santo, Gold Glove Award

All-Star Game

- Billy Williams, Outfield, Starter
- Dick Ellsworth, Pitcher, Reserve
- Ron Santo, Third Base, Reserve

== Farm system ==
Level	Team	League	Manager
AAA	Salt Lake City Bees	Pacific Coast League	Vedie Himsl
AA	Fort Worth Cats	Texas League	Alex Grammas
A	St. Cloud Rox	Northern League	Walt Dixon
A	Wenatchee Chiefs	Northwest League	Joe Macko
Rookie	Treasure Valley Cubs	Pioneer League	George Freese

LEAGUE CHAMPIONS: Treasure Valley
