= 1964 Milwaukee Braves season =

1964 Milwaukee Braves
- League: National League
- Ballpark: Milwaukee County Stadium
- City: Milwaukee, Wisconsin
- Record: 88–74 (.543)
- League place: 5th
- Owners: William Bartholomay (chairman)
- General managers: John McHale
- Managers: Bobby Bragan
- Television: WTMJ-TV (Bill Mazer, Blaine Walsh)
- Radio: WEMP (Merle Harmon, Tom Collins, Blaine Walsh)

The 1964 Milwaukee Braves season was the team's 12th season in Milwaukee while also the 94th season overall. The fifth-place Braves finished the season with an 88–74 (.543) record, five games behind the National League and World Series champion St. Louis Cardinals.

Milwaukee finished the season with ten wins in the final eleven games; the season's home attendance was 910,911, their highest since 1961, and the highest of the last four seasons in Milwaukee (1962–65).

It was the franchise's penultimate season in Milwaukee. The franchise had attempted to move to Atlanta shortly after this season; it was delayed a year, and the team relocated for the 1966 season.

== Offseason ==
- October 10, 1963: Claude Raymond was drafted from the Braves by the Houston Colt .45s in a 1963 special draft.
- December 2, 1963: Lou Jackson was drafted from the Braves by the Baltimore Orioles in the 1963 Rule 5 draft.
- March 22, 1964: Cito Gaston was signed as an amateur free agent by the Braves.
- Prior to 1964 season: Skip Guinn was signed as an amateur free agent by the Braves.

== Regular season ==
=== Season standings ===
National League
Team	W	L	Pct.	GB	Home	Road
St. Louis Cardinals	93	69	.574	—	48‍–‍33	45‍–‍36
Philadelphia Phillies	92	70	.568	1	46‍–‍35	46‍–‍35
Cincinnati Reds	92	70	.568	1	47‍–‍34	45‍–‍36
San Francisco Giants	90	72	.556	3	44‍–‍37	46‍–‍35
Milwaukee Braves	88	74	.543	5	45‍–‍36	43‍–‍38
Pittsburgh Pirates	80	82	.494	13	42‍–‍39	38‍–‍43
Los Angeles Dodgers	80	82	.494	13	41‍–‍40	39‍–‍42
Chicago Cubs	76	86	.469	17	40‍–‍41	36‍–‍45
Houston Colt .45s	66	96	.407	27	41‍–‍40	25‍–‍56
New York Mets	53	109	.327	40	33‍–‍48	20‍–‍61

=== Record vs. opponents ===
1964 National League record Sources:
Team	CHC	CIN	HOU	LAD	MIL	NYM	PHI	PIT	SF	STL
Chicago	—	6–12	11–7	10–8	8–10	11–7	6–12	9–9	9–9	6–12
Cincinnati	12–6	—	12–6	14–4–1	9–9	11–7	9–9	8–10	7–11	10–8
Houston	7–11	6–12	—	7–11	12–6	9–9	5–13	5–13	7–11	8–10
Los Angeles	8–10	4–14–1	11–7	—	8–10	15–3–1	8–10	10–8	6–12	10–8
Milwaukee	10–8	9–9	6–12	10–8	—	14–4	10–8	12–6	9–9	8–10
New York	7–11	7–11	9–9	3–15–1	4–14	—	3–15	6–12	7–11	7–11
Philadelphia	12-6	9–9	13–5	10–8	8–10	15–3	—	10–8	10–8	5–13
Pittsburgh	9–9	10–8	13–5	8–10	6–12	12–6	8–10	—	8–10	6–12
San Francisco	9–9	11–7	11–7	12–6	9–9	11–7	8–10	10–8	—	9–9
St. Louis	12–6	8–10	10–8	8–10	10–8	11–7	13–5	12–6	9–9	—

=== Notable transactions ===
- April 9, 1964: Bob Uecker was traded by the Braves to the St. Louis Cardinals for Jimmie Coker and Gary Kolb.
- May 12, 1964: Gus Bell was released by the Braves.
- June 3, 1964: Len Gabrielson was traded by the Braves to the Chicago Cubs for $40,000. The Cubs completed the deal by sending Merritt Ranew to the Braves on June 8.
- August 8, 1964: Dennis Ribant and cash were traded by the Braves to the New York Mets for Frank Lary.
- August 14, 1964: Carl Morton was signed as an amateur free agent by the Braves.
- August 23, 1964: Jimmie Coker was purchased from the Braves by the Cincinnati Reds for $35,000.

=== Roster ===
1964 Milwaukee Braves
Roster
Pitchers: 36 Wade Blasingame; 38 John Braun; 32 Cecil Butler; 20 Clay Carroll; 40 Tony Cloninger; 39 Dave Eilers; 34 Hank Fischer; 26 Billy Hoeft; 22 Dick Kelley; 17 Frank Lary; 23 Denny Lemaster; 35 Phil Niekro; 30 Chi-Chi Olivo; 37 Bob Sadowski; 25 Dan Schneider; 45,53 Jack Smith; 21 Warren Spahn; 18 Bobby Tiefenauer; 46 Arnold Umbach	Catchers: 9 Ed Bailey; 8 Merritt Ranew; 19 Phil Roof; 15 Joe Torre; Infielders: 16 Sandy Alomar Sr.; 2 Frank Bolling; 7 Mike de la Hoz; 39 Len Gabrielson; 11 Lou Klimchock; 41 Eddie Mathews; 11 Roy McMillan; 19 Denis Menke; 12 Gene Oliver; 47 Bill Southworth; 14 Woody Woodward	Outfielders: 44 Hank Aaron; 29 Felipe Alou; 42 Ethan Blackaby; 43 Rico Carty; 31 Ty Cline; 27 Gary Kolb; 24 Lee Maye; Other batters: 20 Gus Bell	Manager: 10 Bobby Bragan; Coaches: 3 Ken Silvestri; 6 Dixie Walker; 4 Jo-Jo White; 5 Whit Wyatt

== Player stats ==
=== Batting ===
==== Starters by position ====
Note: Pos = Position; G = Games played; AB = At bats; H = Hits; Avg. = Batting average; HR = Home runs; RBI = Runs batted in

Pos	Player	G	AB	H	Avg.	HR	RBI
C	Joe Torre	154	601	193	.321	20	109
1B	Gene Oliver	93	279	77	.276	13	49
2B	Frank Bolling	120	352	70	.199	5	34
3B	Eddie Mathews	141	502	117	.233	23	74
SS	Denis Menke	151	505	143	.283	20	65
LF	Rico Carty	133	455	150	.330	22	88
CF	Lee Maye	153	588	179	.304	10	74
RF	Hank Aaron	145	570	187	.328	24	95

==== Other batters ====
Note: G = Games played; AB = At bats; H = Hits; Avg. = Batting average; HR = Home runs; RBI = Runs batted in

Player	G	AB	H	Avg.	HR	RBI
Felipe Alou	121	415	105	.253	9	51
Ed Bailey	95	271	71	.262	5	34
Mike de la Hoz	78	189	55	.291	4	12
Ty Cline	101	116	35	.302	1	13
Woody Woodward	77	115	24	.209	0	11
Gary Kolb	36	64	12	.188	0	2
Sandy Alomar Sr.	19	53	13	.245	0	6
Len Gabrielson	24	38	7	.184	0	1
Lou Klimchock	10	21	7	.333	0	2
Merritt Ranew	9	17	2	.118	0	0
Roy McMillan	8	13	4	.308	0	2
Ethan Blackaby	9	12	1	.083	0	1
Bill Southworth	3	7	2	.286	1	2
Gus Bell	3	3	0	.000	0	0
Phil Roof	1	2	0	.000	0	0

=== Pitching ===
==== Starting pitchers ====
Note: G = Games pitched; IP = Innings pitched; W = Wins; L = Losses; ERA = Earned run average; SO = Strikeouts

Player	G	IP	W	L	ERA	SO
Tony Cloninger	38	242.2	19	14	3.56	163
Denny Lemaster	39	221.0	17	11	4.15	185
Hank Fischer	37	168.1	11	10	4.01	99
Arnold Umbach	1	8.1	1	0	3.24	7

==== Other pitchers ====
Note: G = Games pitched; IP = Innings pitched; W = Wins; L = Losses; ERA = Earned run average; SO = Strikeouts

Player	G	IP	W	L	ERA	SO
Warren Spahn	38	173.2	6	13	5.29	78
Bob Sadowski	51	166.2	9	10	4.10	96
Wade Blasingame	28	116.2	9	5	4.24	70
Dan Schneider	13	36.1	1	2	5.45	14
Frank Lary	5	12.1	1	0	4.38	4

==== Relief pitchers ====
Note: G = Games pitched; W = Wins; L = Losses; SV = Saves; ERA = Earned run average; SO = Strikeouts

Player	G	W	L	SV	ERA	SO
Bobby Tiefenauer	46	4	6	13	3.21	48
Billy Hoeft	42	4	0	4	3.80	47
Chi-Chi Olivo	38	2	1	5	3.75	45
Jack Smith	22	2	2	0	3.77	19
Clay Carroll	11	2	0	1	1.77	17
Phil Niekro	10	0	0	0	4.80	8
Dave Eilers	6	0	0	0	4.70	1
Cecil Butler	2	0	0	0	8.31	2
Dick Kelley	2	0	0	0	18.00	2
John Braun	1	0	0	0	0.00	1

== Farm system ==
Level	Team	League	Manager
AAA	Toronto Maple Leafs	International League	Sparky Anderson
AAA	Denver Bears	Pacific Coast League	Bill Adair
AA	Austin Senators	Texas League	Buddy Hicks
A	Binghamton Triplets	New York–Penn League	Andy Pafko
A	Yakima Bears	Northwest League	Hub Kittle
A	Greenville Braves	Western Carolinas League	Bill Steinecke and Jimmy Brown
Rookie	SRL Braves	Sarasota Rookie League	Paul Snyder

LEAGUE CHAMPIONS: Yakima, SRL Braves
Toronto affiliation shared with Washington Senators
