= 1963 St. Louis Cardinals season =

Major League Baseball season

1963 St. Louis Cardinals
- League: National League
- Ballpark: Busch Stadium I
- City: St. Louis, Missouri
- Record: 93–69 (.574)
- League place: 2nd
- Owners: August "Gussie" Busch
- General managers: Bing Devine
- Managers: Johnny Keane
- Television: KSD-TV
- Radio: KMOX (Harry Caray, Jack Buck, Jerry Gross)

The 1963 St. Louis Cardinals season was the team's 82nd season in St. Louis, Missouri and its 72nd season in the National League. The Cardinals went 93–69 (.574) during the season, and finished second in the National League, six games behind the eventual World Series champion Los Angeles Dodgers. The season was Stan Musial's 22nd and final season with the team, and in MLB. This is also the first season that the players' last names appeared on the back of the uniforms.

== Offseason ==
- October 5, 1962: Red Schoendienst was released by the Cardinals.
- October 17, 1962: Larry Jackson, Lindy McDaniel, and Jimmie Schaffer were traded by the Cardinals to the Chicago Cubs for Don Cardwell, George Altman and Moe Thacker.
- November 19, 1962: Don Cardwell and Julio Gotay were traded by the Cardinals to the Pittsburgh Pirates for Dick Groat and Diomedes Olivo.
- November 26, 1962: Tom Matchick was drafted from the Cardinals by the Detroit Tigers in the 1962 first-year draft.
- Prior to 1963 season: Duke Carmel was acquired from the Indians by the St. Louis Cardinals.
- February 1963: Coco Laboy was signed as a free agent by the Cardinals.

== Regular season ==
Future Hall of Famer Stan Musial played his final game on September 29, a 3–2 victory in 14 innings against the visiting Cincinnati Reds.

All four starting infielders in the 1963 All-Star Game were Cardinals. Ken Boyer (3B), Dick Groat (SS), and Bill White (1B) were elected, and Julián Javier (2B) took over for the elected but injured Bill Mazeroski of Pittsburgh.

Pitcher Bobby Shantz, first baseman Bill White, third baseman Ken Boyer, and outfielder Curt Flood won Gold Gloves this year.

=== Season standings ===
National League
Team	W	L	Pct.	GB	Home	Road
Los Angeles Dodgers	99	63	.611	—	50‍–‍31	49‍–‍32
St. Louis Cardinals	93	69	.574	6	53‍–‍28	40‍–‍41
San Francisco Giants	88	74	.543	11	50‍–‍31	38‍–‍43
Philadelphia Phillies	87	75	.537	12	45‍–‍36	42‍–‍39
Cincinnati Reds	86	76	.531	13	46‍–‍35	40‍–‍41
Milwaukee Braves	84	78	.519	15	45‍–‍36	39‍–‍42
Chicago Cubs	82	80	.506	17	43‍–‍38	39‍–‍42
Pittsburgh Pirates	74	88	.457	25	42‍–‍39	32‍–‍49
Houston Colt .45s	66	96	.407	33	44‍–‍37	22‍–‍59
New York Mets	51	111	.315	48	34‍–‍47	17‍–‍64

=== Record vs. opponents ===
1963 National League record Sources:
Team	CHC	CIN	HOU	LAD	MIL	NYM	PHI	PIT	SF	STL
Chicago	—	9–9	9–9	7–11	12–6	11–7	9–9	8–10	10–8	7–11
Cincinnati	9–9	—	11–7	8–10	10–8	10–8	8–10	11–7	8–10	11–7
Houston	9–9	7–11	—	5–13	5–13	13–5	8–10	6–12	8–10	5–13
Los Angeles	11–7	10–8	13–5	—	8–10–1	16–2	7–11	13–5	9–9	12–6
Milwaukee	6–12	8–10	13–5	10–8–1	—	12–6	10–8	7–11	10–8	8–10
New York	7–11	8–10	5–13	2–16	6–12	—	8–10	4–14	6–12	5–13
Philadelphia	9–9	10–8	10–8	11–7	8–10	10–8	—	13–5	8–10	8–10
Pittsburgh	10–8	7–11	12–6	5–13	11–7	14–4	5–13	—	5–13	5–13
San Francisco	8–10	10–8	10–8	9–9	8–10	12–6	10–8	13–5	—	8–10
St. Louis	11–7	7–11	13–5	6–12	10–8	13–5	10–8	13–5	10–8	—

=== Notable transactions ===
- April 2, 1963: Minnie Miñoso was purchased from the Cardinals by the Washington Senators.
- April 1963: Bob Smith was purchased from the Cardinals by the Boston Red Sox.
- June 13, 1963: Elrod Hendricks was released by the Cardinals.
- July 29, 1963: Duke Carmel was traded by the Cardinals to the New York Mets for Jacke Davis and cash.

=== Roster ===
1963 St. Louis Cardinals
Roster
Pitchers: 38 Ed Bauta; 32 Ernie Broglio; 33 Lew Burdette; 30 Harry Fanok; 45 Bob Gibson; 47 Bob Humphreys; 35 Sam Jones; 28 Ken MacKenzie; 41 Diomedes Olivo; 37 Ray Sadecki; 36 Barney Schultz; 34 Bobby Shantz; 31 Curt Simmons; 39 Ron Taylor; 44 Ray Washburn	Catchers: 15 Tim McCarver; 29 Gene Oliver; 38 Dave Ricketts; 1 Carl Sawatski; 29 Moe Thacker; Infielders: 19 Bud Bloomfield; 14 Ken Boyer; 11 Jerry Buchek; 19 Jack Damaska; 16 Phil Gagliano; 24 Dick Groat; 25 Julián Javier; 27 Dal Maxvill; 12 Bill White	Outfielders: 26 George Altman; 18 Leo Burke; 28 Duke Carmel; 22 Doug Clemens; 21 Curt Flood; 23 Charlie James; 20 Gary Kolb; 6 Stan Musial; 18 Mike Shannon; 29 Corky Withrow; Other batters: 17 Jim Beauchamp; 10 Jeoff Long; 2 Red Schoendienst	Manager: 5 Johnny Keane; Coaches: 8 Vern Benson; 4 Howie Pollet; 2 Red Schoendienst; 3 Joe Schultz

== Game log ==
=== Regular season ===
Legend
	Cardinals win
	Cardinals loss
	Postponement
	Eliminated from playoff race
**Bold**	Cardinals team member

1963 regular season game log: 93–69 (Home: 53–28; Away: 40–41)
April: 14–6 (Home: 4–3; Away: 10–3)

#	Date	Time (CT)	Opponent	Score	Win	Loss	Save	Time of Game	Attendance	Record	Box/ Streak
17	April 26	10:00 p.m. CST	@ Dodgers	**W** 8–7	**Bauta** (1–1)	Perranoski (2–1)	**Shantz** (1)	2:41	24,959	11–6	W1
18	April 27	10:00 p.m. CST	@ Dodgers	**W** 3–0	**Washburn** (4–0)	Sherry (0–1)	—	2:15	33,949	12–6	W2
19	April 28	3:00 p.m. CDT	@ Dodgers	**W** 9–5	**Broglio** (3–0)	Podres (1–3)	**Taylor** (1)	2:56	36,245	13–6	W3

May: 15–15 (Home: 10–6; Away: 5–9)

#	Date	Time (CT)	Opponent	Score	Win	Loss	Save	Time of Game	Attendance	Record	Box/ Streak
27	May 7	8:00 p.m. CDT	Dodgers	L 1–11	Koufax (3–1)	**Washburn** (5–1)	Rowe (1)	2:23	16,609	16–11	L1
28	May 8	8:00 p.m. CDT	Dodgers	L 5–11	Perranoski (5–1)	**Shantz** (1–2)	Scott (1)	2:50	10,918	16–12	L2
29	May 9	8:00 p.m. CDT	Dodgers	**W** 10–7	**Gibson** (1–1)	Richert (0–1)	**Fanok** (1)	2:56	10,762	17–12	W1

June: 16–10 (Home: 10–6; Away: 6–4)

#	Date	Time (CT)	Opponent	Score	Win	Loss	Save	Time of Game	Attendance	Record	Box/ Streak
68	June 21	8:00 p.m. CDT	Dodgers	L 3–5	Koufax (11–3)	**Simmons** (7–3)	Perranoski (4)	2:32	28,423	40–28	L1
69	June 22	1:30 p.m. CDT	Dodgers	**W** 2–1	**Gibson** (6–3)	Willhite (1–1)	**Taylor** (4)	2:32	20,875	41–28	W1
70	June 23	1:30 p.m. CDT	Dodgers	L 3–4	Miller (5–4)	**Broglio** (8–3)	Perranoski (5)	2:41	26,553	41–29	L1

July: 14–16 (Home: 7–5; Away: 7–11)

#	Date	Time (CT)	Opponent	Score	Win	Loss	Save	Time of Game	Attendance	Record	Box/ Streak
78	July 2	10:00 p.m. CDT	@ Dodgers	L 0–1	Drysdale (10–9)	**Simmons** (7–4)	—	1:48	39,824	45–33	L3
79	July 3	10:00 p.m. CDT	@ Dodgers	L 0–5	Koufax (13–3)	**Gibson** (7–4)	—	1:53	51,898	45–34	L4
80	July 4	10:00 p.m. CDT	@ Dodgers	L 7–10	Roebuck (2–3)	**Broglio** (9–4)	Perranoski (7)	3:02	30,726	45–35	L5
—	July 9	12:00 Noon CDT	34th All-Star Game	National League vs. American League (Cleveland Municipal Stadium, Cleveland, Ohio)							

August: 15–13 (Home: 5–3; Away: 10–10)

#	Date	Time (CT)	Opponent	Score	Win	Loss	Save	Time of Game	Attendance	Record	Box/ Streak
124	August 20	10:00 p.m. CDT	@ Dodgers	L 5–7	Miller (8–8)	Burdette (8–10)	—	2:45	50,122	69–55	L1
125	August 21	10:00 p.m. CDT	@ Dodgers	L 1–2 (16)	Sherry (2–4)	**Taylor** (7–5)	—	3:48	54,125	69–56	L2
126	August 22	10:00 p.m. CDT	@ Dodgers	**W** 3–2	**Broglio** (14–8)	Drysdale (16–14)	**Jones** (2)	2:32	48,569	70–56	W1

September: 19–9 (Home: 14–5; Away: 5–4)

#	Date	Time (CT)	Opponent	Score	Win	Loss	Save	Time of Game	Attendance	Record	Box/ Streak
153	September 16	8:00 p.m. CDT	Dodgers	L 1–3	Podres (14–10)	**Shantz** (6–4)	Perranoski (18)	2:34	32,442	91–62	L1
154	September 17	8:00 p.m. CDT	Dodgers	L 0–4	Koufax (24–5)	**Simmons** (15–8)	—	1:51	30,450	91–63	L2
155	September 18	8:00 p.m. CDT	Dodgers	L 5–6 (13)	Perranoski (16–3)	**Burdette** (9–12)	—	3:44	25,975	91–64	L3

=== Detailed records ===
**National League**
Opponent	Home	Away	Total	Pct.	Runs scored	Runs allowed
Los Angeles Dodgers	2–7	4–5	6–12	.333	66	91
**St. Louis Cardinals**	—	—	—	—	—	—
	**53–28**	**40–41**	**93–69**	**.574**	**747**	**628**

== Player stats ==
=== Batting ===
==== Starters by position ====
Note: Pos = Position; G = Games played; AB = At bats; H = Hits; Avg. = Batting average; HR = Home runs; RBI = Runs batted in

Pos	Player	G	AB	H	Avg.	HR	RBI
C	Tim McCarver	127	405	117	.289	4	51
1B	Bill White	162	658	200	.304	27	109
2B	Julián Javier	161	609	160	.263	9	46
SS	Dick Groat	158	631	201	.319	6	73
3B	Ken Boyer	159	617	176	.285	24	111
LF	Stan Musial	124	337	86	.255	12	58
CF	Curt Flood	158	662	200	.302	5	63
RF	George Altman	135	464	127	.274	9	47

==== Other batters ====
Note: G = Games played; AB = At bats; H = Hits; Avg. = Batting average; HR = Home runs; RBI = Runs batted in

Player	G	AB	H	Avg.	HR	RBI
Charlie James	116	347	93	.268	10	45
Carl Sawatski	56	105	25	.238	6	14
Gene Oliver	39	102	23	.225	6	18
Gary Kolb	75	96	26	.271	3	10
Dal Maxvill	53	51	12	.235	0	3
Leo Burke	30	49	10	.204	1	5
Duke Carmel	57	44	10	.227	1	2
Mike Shannon	32	26	8	.308	1	2
Corky Withrow	6	9	0	.000	0	1
Dave Ricketts	3	8	2	.250	0	0
Doug Clemens	5	6	1	.167	1	2
Phil Gagliano	10	5	2	.400	0	1
Red Schoendienst	6	5	0	.000	0	0
Jack Damaska	5	5	1	.200	0	1
Jeoff Long	5	5	1	.200	0	0
Moe Thacker	3	4	0	.000	0	0
Jerry Buchek	3	4	1	.250	0	0
Jim Beauchamp	4	3	0	.000	0	0
Bud Bloomfield	1	0	0	----	0	0

=== Pitching ===
==== Starting pitchers ====
Note: G = Games pitched; IP = Innings pitched; W = Wins; L = Losses; ERA = Earned run average; SO = Strikeouts

Player	G	IP	W	L	ERA	SO
Bob Gibson	36	254.2	18	9	3.39	204
Ernie Broglio	39	250.0	18	8	2.99	145
Curt Simmons	32	232.2	15	9	2.48	127
Ray Sadecki	36	193.1	10	10	4.10	136
Lew Burdette	21	98.0	3	8	3.77	45
Ray Washburn	11	64.0	5	3	3.08	47

==== Other pitchers ====
Note: G = Games pitched; IP = Innings pitched; W = Wins; L = Losses; ERA = Earned run average; SO = Strikeouts

Player	G	IP	W	L	ERA	SO
Ron Taylor	54	133.1	9	7	2.84	91

==== Relief pitchers ====
Note: G = Games pitched; W = Wins; L = Losses; SV = Saves; ERA = Earned run average; SO = Strikeouts

Player	G	W	L	SV	ERA	SO
Bobby Shantz	55	6	4	11	2.61	70
Ed Bauta	38	3	4	3	3.93	30
Barney Schultz	24	2	0	1	3.57	26
Diomedes Olivo	19	0	5	0	5.40	9
Harry Fanok	12	2	1	1	5.26	25
Sam Jones	11	2	0	2	9.00	8
Bob Humphreys	9	0	1	0	5.06	8
Ken MacKenzie	8	0	0	0	4.00	7

== Awards and honors ==
- Johnny Keane, Associated Press NL Manager of the Year

All-Star Game

- Bill White, first base, starter
- Ken Boyer, third base, starter
- Dick Groat, shortstop, starter
- Stan Musial, reserve

== Farm system ==
Level	Team	League	Manager
AAA	Atlanta Crackers	International League	Harry Walker
AA	Tulsa Oilers	Texas League	Grover Resinger
A	Brunswick Cardinals	Georgia–Florida League	George Kissell
A	Winnipeg Goldeyes	Northern League	Fred Koenig
A	Billings Mustangs	Pioneer League	Ron Plaza

LEAGUE CHAMPIONS: Tulsa
