= 1964 Los Angeles Dodgers season =

1964 Los Angeles Dodgers
- League: National League
- Ballpark: Dodger Stadium
- City: Los Angeles
- Record: 80–82 (.494)
- Divisional place: 6th
- Owners: Walter O'Malley, James & Dearie Mulvey
- President: Walter O'Malley
- General managers: Buzzie Bavasi
- Managers: Walter Alston
- Television: KTTV (11)
- Radio: KFI; Vin Scully, Jerry Doggett; KWKW; Jose Garcia, Jaime Jarrín

The 1964 Los Angeles Dodgers season was the 75th season for the Los Angeles Dodgers franchise in Major League Baseball (MLB), their 7th season in Los Angeles, California, and their 3rd season playing their home games at Dodger Stadium in Los Angeles California. The Dodgers finished with a record of 80–82, 13 games behind the National League and World Series Champion St. Louis Cardinals, tied for sixth place with the Pittsburgh Pirates.

== Offseason ==
- October 14, 1963: Mike Brumley was purchased from the Dodgers by the Washington Senators.
- December 6, 1963: Bill Skowron was purchased from the Dodgers by the Washington Senators.
- December 13, 1963: Dick Scott was traded by the Dodgers to the Chicago Cubs for Jim Brewer and Cuno Barragan,
- Prior to 1964 season: Mike Kekich was signed as an amateur free agent by the Dodgers.

== Regular season ==
=== Season standings ===
National League
Team	W	L	Pct.	GB	Home	Road
St. Louis Cardinals	93	69	.574	—	48‍–‍33	45‍–‍36
Philadelphia Phillies	92	70	.568	1	46‍–‍35	46‍–‍35
Cincinnati Reds	92	70	.568	1	47‍–‍34	45‍–‍36
San Francisco Giants	90	72	.556	3	44‍–‍37	46‍–‍35
Milwaukee Braves	88	74	.543	5	45‍–‍36	43‍–‍38
Pittsburgh Pirates	80	82	.494	13	42‍–‍39	38‍–‍43
Los Angeles Dodgers	80	82	.494	13	41‍–‍40	39‍–‍42
Chicago Cubs	76	86	.469	17	40‍–‍41	36‍–‍45
Houston Colt .45s	66	96	.407	27	41‍–‍40	25‍–‍56
New York Mets	53	109	.327	40	33‍–‍48	20‍–‍61

=== Record vs. opponents ===
1964 National League record Sources:
Team	CHC	CIN	HOU	LAD	MIL	NYM	PHI	PIT	SF	STL
Chicago	—	6–12	11–7	10–8	8–10	11–7	6–12	9–9	9–9	6–12
Cincinnati	12–6	—	12–6	14–4–1	9–9	11–7	9–9	8–10	7–11	10–8
Houston	7–11	6–12	—	7–11	12–6	9–9	5–13	5–13	7–11	8–10
Los Angeles	8–10	4–14–1	11–7	—	8–10	15–3–1	8–10	10–8	6–12	10–8
Milwaukee	10–8	9–9	6–12	10–8	—	14–4	10–8	12–6	9–9	8–10
New York	7–11	7–11	9–9	3–15–1	4–14	—	3–15	6–12	7–11	7–11
Philadelphia	12-6	9–9	13–5	10–8	8–10	15–3	—	10–8	10–8	5–13
Pittsburgh	9–9	10–8	13–5	8–10	6–12	12–6	8–10	—	8–10	6–12
San Francisco	9–9	11–7	11–7	12–6	9–9	11–7	8–10	10–8	—	9–9
St. Louis	12–6	8–10	10–8	8–10	10–8	11–7	13–5	12–6	9–9	—

=== Opening Day lineup ===
Opening Day starters
Name	Position
Maury Wills	Shortstop
Jim Gilliam	Second baseman
Willie Davis	Center fielder
Tommy Davis	Left fielder
Ron Fairly	First baseman
Frank Howard	Right fielder
John Roseboro	Catcher
Johnny Werhas	Third baseman
Sandy Koufax	Starting pitcher

=== Notable transactions ===
- April 9, 1964: Larry Sherry was traded by the Dodgers to the Detroit Tigers for Lou Johnson and cash.
- September 10, 1964: Ken Rowe was purchased from the Dodgers by the Baltimore Orioles.

=== Roster ===
1964 Los Angeles Dodgers
Roster
Pitchers: 21 Jim Brewer; 53 Don Drysdale; 32 Sandy Koufax; 15 Bob Miller; 41 Larry Miller; 38 Joe Moeller; 17 Phil Ortega; 16 Ron Perranoski; 22 Johnny Podres; 47 John Purdin; 39 Howie Reed; 45 Pete Richert; 40 Bill Singer; 37 Nick Willhite	Catchers: 35 Doug Camilli; 8 John Roseboro; 10 Jeff Torborg; Infielders: 6 Ron Fairly; 19 Jim Gilliam; 26 Derrell Griffith; 11 Ken McMullen; 29 Nate Oliver; 23 Bart Shirley; 44 Dick Tracewski; 14 Johnny Werhas; 30 Maury Wills	Outfielders: 43 Willie Crawford; 12 Tommy Davis; 3 Willie Davis; 25 Frank Howard; 9 Wally Moon; 28 Wes Parker; 7 Lee Walls	Manager: 24 Walter Alston; Coaches: 33 Joe Becker; 2 Leo Durocher; 31 Greg Mulleavy; 27 Pete Reiser

== Player stats ==
= Indicates team leader

=== Batting ===
==== Starters by position ====
Note: Pos = Position; G = Games played; AB = At bats; H = Hits; Avg. = Batting average; HR = Home runs; RBI = Runs batted in

Pos	Player	GP	AB	H	Avg.	HR	RBI
C	John Roseboro	134	414	119	.287	3	45
1B	Ron Fairly	150	454	116	.256	10	74
2B	Nate Oliver	99	321	78	.243	0	21
3B	Jim Gilliam	116	334	76	.228	2	27
SS	Maury Wills	158	630	173	.275	2	34
LF	Tommy Davis	152	592	163	.275	14	86
CF	Willie Davis	157	613	180	.294	12	77
RF	Frank Howard	134	433	98	.226	24	69

==== Other batters ====
Note: G = Games played; AB = At bats; H = Hits; Avg. = Batting average; HR = Home runs; RBI = Runs batted in

Player	G	AB	H	Avg.	HR	RBI
Dick Tracewski	106	304	75	.247	1	26
Derrell Griffith	78	238	69	.290	4	23
Wes Parker	124	214	55	.257	3	10
Doug Camilli	50	123	22	.179	0	10
Wally Moon	68	118	26	.220	2	9
Johnny Werhas	29	83	16	.193	0	8
Ken McMullen	24	67	14	.209	1	2
Bart Shirley	18	62	17	.274	0	7
Jeff Torborg	28	43	10	.233	0	4
Lee Walls	37	28	5	.179	0	3
Willie Crawford	10	16	5	.313	0	0

=== Pitching ===
==== Starting pitchers ====
Note: G = Games pitched; IP = Innings pitched; W = Wins; L = Losses; ERA = Earned run average; SO = Strikeouts

Player	G	IP	W	L	ERA	SO
Don Drysdale	40	321.1	18	16	2.18	237
Sandy Koufax	29	223.0	19	5	1.74	223
Phil Ortega	34	157.1	7	9	4.00	107
Joe Moeller	27	145.1	7	13	4.21	97
Larry Miller	16	79.2	4	8	4.18	50
Bill Singer	2	14.0	0	1	3.21	3
Johnny Podres	2	2.2	0	2	16.88	0

==== Other pitchers ====
Note: G = Games pitched; IP = Innings pitched; W = Wins; L = Losses; ERA = Earned run average; SO = Strikeouts

Player	G	IP	W	L	ERA	SO
Jim Brewer	34	93.0	4	3	3.00	63
Howie Reed	26	90.0	3	4	3.20	52
Nick Willhite	10	43.2	2	4	3.71	24
Pete Richert	8	34.2	2	3	4.15	25
John Purdin	3	16.0	2	0	0.56	8

==== Relief pitchers ====
Note: G = Games pitched; W = Wins; L = Losses; SV = Saves; ERA = Earned run average; SO = Strikeouts

Player	G	W	L	SV	ERA	SO
Ron Perranoski	72	5	7	14	3.09	79
Bob Miller	74	7	7	9	2.62	94

== Awards and honors ==
Hall of Famer Sandy Koufax

- 1964 Major League Baseball All-Star Game
  - Don Drysdale starter
  - Sandy Koufax reserve
- TSN Pitcher of the Year Award
  - Sandy Koufax
- TSN National League All-Star
  - Sandy Koufax

== Farm system ==
Level	Team	League	Manager
AAA	Spokane Indians	Pacific Coast League	Danny Ozark
AA	Albuquerque Dukes	Texas League	Clay Bryant
A	Grand Forks Dodgers	Northern League	James B. Williams
A	Salem Dodgers	Northwest League	Stan Wasiak
A	Salisbury Dodgers	Western Carolinas League	George Scherger
A	Santa Barbara Dodgers	California League	Al Ronning
A	St. Petersburg Saints	Florida State League	Roy Hartsfield
Rookie	Pocatello Chiefs	Pioneer League	Ernie Rodriguez

LEAGUE CHAMPIONS: Salem, Salisbury
