= Umbach (surname) =

Umbach is a surname of German origin. Notable people with the surname include:

- Arnold Umbach (1942–2020), American baseball player
- Jonas Umbach (c. 1624–1693), German painter, designer, and engraver
- Paul Umbach (born 2002), German pararower
