= Sandy Alomar =

Sandy Alomar may refer to:

- Sandy Alomar Sr. (1943–2025), Puerto Rican infielder and coach in Major League Baseball
- Sandy Alomar Jr. (born 1966), Puerto Rican former catcher and coach in Major League Baseball
