= Bobby Bragan =

American baseball player and manager (1917–2010)

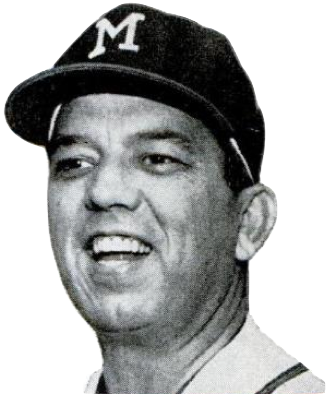
- Bragan as manager of the Braves in 1963.
- Shortstop / Catcher / Manager
- Born: October 30, 1917; Birmingham, Alabama, U.S.
- Died: January 21, 2010 (aged 92); Fort Worth, Texas, U.S.
- Batted: Right Threw: Right

MLB debut
- April 16, 1940, for the Philadelphia Phillies

Last MLB appearance
- June 27, 1948, for the Brooklyn Dodgers

MLB statistics
- Batting average: .240
- Home runs: 15
- Runs batted in: 172
- Managerial record: 443–478
- Winning %: .481
- Stats at Baseball Reference
- Managerial record at Baseball Reference

Teams
- As player: Philadelphia Phillies (1940–1942); Brooklyn Dodgers (1943–1944, 1947–1948); As manager: Pittsburgh Pirates (1956–1957); Cleveland Indians (1958); Milwaukee / Atlanta Braves (1963–1966); As coach: Los Angeles Dodgers (1960); Houston Colt .45s (1962)

Robert Randall Bragan (October 30, 1917 – January 21, 2010) was an American shortstop, catcher, manager, and coach in Major League Baseball and an influential minor league executive. His professional baseball career encompassed 73 years, from his first season as a player in the Class D Alabama–Florida League in 1937, to 2009, the last full year of his life, when he was still listed as a consultant to the Texas Rangers' organization.

Bragan played eight seasons with the Philadelphia Phillies and Brooklyn Dodgers in the 1940s, before going on to manage the Pittsburgh Pirates, Cleveland Indians and Milwaukee/Atlanta Braves in the late 1950s and 1960s. He also managed in the Cuban League, leading Almendares to two championships.

On August 16, 2005, Bragan donned a uniform to manage the independent Central League Fort Worth Cats for one game, making him—at 87 years, nine months, and 16 days old—the oldest manager in professional baseball annals, besting by one week Connie Mack, the manager and part-owner of the Philadelphia Athletics from 1901 through 1950. However, Bragan was ejected in the third inning of his "comeback", thus also becoming the oldest person in any capacity to be ejected from a professional baseball game.

Bragan died on January 21, 2010, of a heart attack at his home in Fort Worth.

== Career as player and field manager ==
Bragan was born in Birmingham, Alabama. After three years of minor-league seasoning, he began his seven-year (1940–44; 1947–48) Major League playing career as a shortstop for the Philadelphia Phillies, but by 1943, his first season with the Brooklyn Dodgers, he had learned how to catch and was for the most part a backup receiver for the Dodgers for the remainder of his MLB playing days. A right-handed batter listed as 5 feet 10 inches (1.78 m) tall and 175 pounds (79 kg), Bragan hit .240 in 597 games, with 456 hits and 15 career home runs. Bragan missed the 1945–46 seasons performing military service. He was commissioned a lieutenant in the United States Army and was stationed at Camp Wheeler, Georgia. In his only World Series appearance, in 1947 against the New York Yankees, he appeared in Game 6 as a pinch hitter; batting for Ralph Branca in the sixth inning with the game tied at five all, he doubled off Yankee relief pitcher Joe Page to drive home Carl Furillo with the eventual winning run. Bragan's hit gave him a perfect 1.000 career batting average in World Series play.

During his Major League managerial career, Bragan never skippered a game past his 49th birthday. He managed the Pittsburgh Pirates (1956–57), Cleveland Indians (1958), and Milwaukee / Atlanta Braves (1963–66), each time getting fired in the mid-season of his final campaign. In Cleveland, he lasted a total of only 67 games of his maiden season before his dismissal—at the time of his firing, his was the shortest managerial stint in team history. His career big-league managerial won–lost record was below .500: 443–478 (.481). He was the Braves' pilot during the transitional period when they relocated from Milwaukee to Atlanta. Bragan also was a Major League coach for the Los Angeles Dodgers (1960) and Houston Colt .45s (1962).

Despite his lack of success in the majors, Bragan was highly respected as a minor league manager, winning championships in 1948 and 1949 with Fort Worth of the Double-A Texas League during a successful 41/2-year run, and with the 1953 Hollywood Stars of the Open-Classification Pacific Coast League. A photograph of Bragan lying at the feet of an umpire who had ejected him, still arguing, was published in Life magazine at the time. Baseball Hall of Fame manager Dick Williams, who played for Bragan at Fort Worth from 1948 to 1950, lauded Bragan in his Cooperstown induction speech in 2008, and wrote, in his autobiography: "There should be a note under every one of my [managerial] records that says 'See Bobby Bragan.' Because a bit of every one of my wins belongs to him."

=== Influenced by Branch Rickey ===
Bragan was a protégé of Branch Rickey, the Hall of Fame front-office executive, who hired him as an unproven young manager at Fort Worth in 1948. Then 30 years old, Bragan had started the 1948 season with the Dodgers but played sparingly, getting into only nine games (starting two) through June 27, and collecting only two hits in a dozen at-bats. When Rickey wanted to make room for Roy Campanella, who was starring in the minors, he offered Bragan the Fort Worth managerial job; he took over in July 1948, and remained with the Cats through 1952. Then, in 1953, Rickey, by now heading the Pittsburgh front office, brought Bragan to Hollywood and the Pirates' organization.

Bragan had clashed with Rickey in 1947 over the Dodgers' breaking of the baseball color line after the big-league debut of Jackie Robinson. Bragan—the Dodgers' second-string catcher at the time—was one of a group of white players, largely from the American South, who signed a petition against Robinson's presence. He even asked Rickey to trade him. But Bragan quickly relented. "After just one road trip, I saw the quality of Jackie the man and the player", Bragan told MLB.com in 2005. "I told Mr. Rickey I had changed my mind and I was honored to be a teammate of Jackie Robinson." When Bragan attended Rickey's funeral in 1965, he stated he decided to attend because, "Branch Rickey made me a better man."

As a manager, Bragan earned a reputation for "color-blindedness." When he was the skipper of the Dodgers' Triple-A Spokane Indians PCL farm club in 1959, he played a pivotal role in helping Maury Wills, a speedy African-American shortstop, rise to Major League stardom. Wills' baseball career had stalled in the Dodgers' farm system until he learned to switch hit under Bragan. Said the Dodgers' then-general manager, Buzzie Bavasi, "Bobby would call six times a day and tell me over again how Wills had learned to switch-hit and how he was a great team leader, off and on the field, and how I was absolutely nuts if I didn't bring him up right away." After batting .313 in 48 games with Spokane in 1959, Wills was promoted to the Dodgers in June and proceeded to win the regular shortstop job. He would fashion a 14-year MLB career, play on three world champions, make seven NL All-Star teams, and in 1962 win the National League Most Valuable Player Award and set a new record for stolen bases in a season, with 104 thefts, breaking Ty Cobb's 47-year-old mark.

In his 1976 memoir The Lords of Baseball, longtime Dodger executive Harold Parrott would claim that Bragan's hiring by the Braves in 1963 was orchestrated by Rickey to thwart a plan by Dodger owner Walter O'Malley to replace his manager, eventual Hall of Famer Walter Alston, with Leo Durocher. Alston had come under withering criticism for failing to win the 1962 National League pennant but O'Malley decided he would make the move on hiring Durocher only if he could find a suitable "soft landing spot" for Alston, who had managed his club for nine seasons and, to that point, had won three NL flags and two World Series titles. The owner chose Milwaukee, fading as contenders and with a managerial vacancy to fill, as Alston's ideal destination. According to Parrott's memoir, Rickey—then in semi-retirement but still O'Malley's bitter enemy—discovered the scheme and brokered the marriage between Bragan and the Braves' ownership before O'Malley's plan could materialize. Alston kept his job in Los Angeles and led the 1963 Dodgers to the world championship for his third Series triumph; he would remain at the Dodger helm through 1976, win three additional pennants and, in 1965, his fourth and final world title.

=== Managerial Record ===
Team	Year	Regular season					Postseason			
Team	Year	Games	Won	Lost	Win %	Finish	Won	Lost	Win %	Result
PIT	1956	154	66	88	.429	7th in NL	–	–	–	
PIT	1957	103	36	67	.350	Fired	–	–	–	
PIT total		0	0	0	–		0	0	–	
CLE	1958	67	31	36	.463	Fired	–	–	–	
CLE total		67	31	36	.463		0	0	–	
MIL	1963	162	84	78	.519	6th in NL	–	–	–	
MIL	1964	162	88	74	.543	5th in NL	–	–	–	
MIL	1965	162	86	76	.531	5th in NL	–	–	–	
ATL	1966	111	52	59	.468	Fired	–	–	–	
MIL/ ATL total		597	310	287	.519		0	0	–	
Total		921	443	478	.481		0	0	–	

== Montreal Expos ==
Bragan scouted for the newborn Montreal Expos expansion franchise in 1968, and that October he agreed to return to uniform as a coach on Gene Mauch's staff for the team's maiden National League season in 1969. But before spring training could begin, in February 1969, Bragan stepped down to become president of the Double-A Texas League. He was one of four color commentators used by the Expos during the 1972 season.

== President of Texas League and National Association ==
A Fort Worth resident since 1948, Bragan spent seven seasons as president of the Texas League. His appointment came during a period of contraction and low attendance for minor league baseball; in 1971, the Texas circuit—down to only seven members when the El Paso franchise withdrew—temporarily merged with the Southern League to form the 14-club Dixie Association. The following season, however, El Paso returned to the Texas League, and Bragan's circuit successfully weathered the defection of two successful franchises, Dallas–Fort Worth, who jumped all the way from Double-A to the American League, and Albuquerque, who moved up to the Triple-A Pacific Coast League. With eight member clubs each, the Texas and Southern leagues resumed their former identities and were poised to capitalize on the attendance boom in the minor leagues that would follow during the 1980s.

Bragan's achievements were recognized during the 1975–76 offseason when he was elected president of the minor leagues' governing body, the National Association of Professional Baseball Leagues, headquartered in Saint Petersburg, Florida. He spent three full years as president of the minor leagues before he and his wife Gwenn returned to Fort Worth, where he joined the Texas Rangers' front office in 1979. He continued to make appearances and speaking engagements on behalf of the ballclub well into his eighties.

After Gwenn Bragan's death in 1983, Bobby married Roberta Beckman. It was Roberta who suggested to Bobby that he establish a scholarship foundation to encourage youth to do well in school and go on to college. With the financial seed money provided by Roberta, the Bobby Bragan Youth Foundation (BBYF) was established in 1991.

Roberta Beckman Bragan died in 1993. Bobby married Betty Bloxam in 1995 and the two stayed together until his death.

As he passed his 90th birthday, Bragan continued an active schedule, as the Chairman of the Bobby Bragan Youth Foundation and making numerous appearances for civic organizations and businesses, including his beloved Fort Worth Cats as well as in schools, where he enjoyed entertaining and motivating students.

Each year, the Bobby Bragan Youth Foundation honors outstanding athletes and executives for the achievements on and off of the playing field at the annual Bobby Bragan Gala to raise funds for the scholarships. Honorees have included Joe DiMaggio, Hank Aaron, Larry King, Tommy Lasorda, Bobby Valentine, Bud Selig, Willie Mays, Lou Brock and Brooks Robinson.

Bragan came from a baseball family. Five of the six Bragan boys played baseball professionally. His brother Jimmy was a minor league player and longtime coach and scout in Major League Baseball who himself was president of the Double-A Southern League during the 1980s. His brother Peter owned and operated the Jacksonville Suns of the Southern League for more than 25 years, and his son, Bobby Bragan Jr., operated the Elmira ball club in the New York–Penn League.

== Honors ==
- 1950 – Selected as Outstanding Young Man of Fort Worth
- 1976 – Elected Outstanding Man of Florida by St. Petersburg Chamber of Commerce
- 1980 – Elected into Alabama Sports Hall of Fame
- 1989 – Received the Wall of Fame from P.O.N.Y. Baseball, Washington, Pennsylvania
- 1998 – Inducted into the Kinston Professional Baseball Hall of Fame
- 2004 – Number retired (# 10) by Fort Worth Cats
- 2005 – Elected into the Texas Sports Hall of Fame
- 2006 – Inducted into the Legends of LaGrave
- Unknown – Dallas–Fort Worth metroplex chapter of SABR was named in honor of Bragan.

Sporting positions
Preceded by George Dockins	Fort Worth Cats manager 1948–1952	Succeeded by Max Macon
Preceded by Fred Haney	Hollywood Stars manager 1953–1955	Succeeded by Clay Hopper
Preceded by Goldie Holt	Spokane Indians manager 1958–1959	Succeeded by Preston Gómez
Preceded by Hugh Finnerty	Texas League president 1969–1975	Succeeded by Carl Sawatski
