= Sandy Alomar Sr. =

Puerto Rican baseball player and coach (1943–2025)

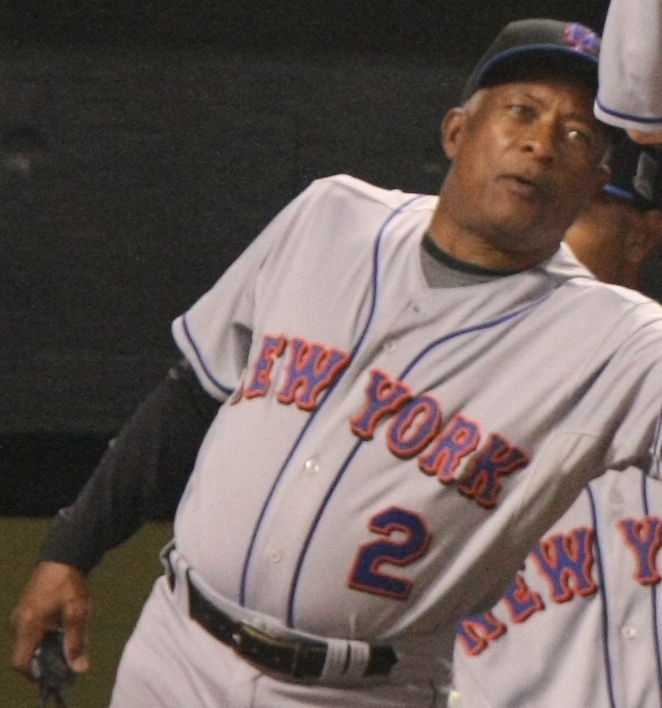
- Alomar with the New York Mets in 2009
- Second baseman
- Born: October 19, 1943; Salinas, Puerto Rico
- Died: October 13, 2025 (aged 81); Salinas, Puerto Rico
- Batted: Switch Threw: Right

MLB debut
- September 15, 1964, for the Milwaukee Braves

Last MLB appearance
- September 30, 1978, for the Texas Rangers

MLB statistics
- Batting average: .245
- Home runs: 13
- Runs batted in: 282
- Stats at Baseball Reference

Teams
- As player: Milwaukee / Atlanta Braves (1964–1966); New York Mets (1967); Chicago White Sox (1967–1969); California Angels (1969–1974); New York Yankees (1974–1976); Texas Rangers (1977–1978); As coach: San Diego Padres (1986–1990); Chicago Cubs (2000–2002); Colorado Rockies (2003–2004); New York Mets (2005–2009)

Career highlights and awards
- All-Star (1970)

Santos Alomar Conde (/ˈæləmɑːr/; Spanish: [aloˈmaɾ]; October 19, 1943 – October 13, 2025), known as Sandy Alomar Sr., was a Puerto Rican second baseman who played in Major League Baseball (MLB) for fourteen seasons, most notably as a member of the California Angels where he was an MLB All-Star player in 1970. Alomar was a switch-hitter and threw right-handed. He was the father of former MLB All-Star catcher Sandy Alomar Jr. and Hall of Fame second baseman Roberto Alomar.

== Early life ==
Alomar was born in Salinas, Puerto Rico, on October 19, 1943, the youngest in a family of nine. He attended Luis Munoz Rivera High School in Salinas. He had three older brothers that played professional baseball, though not in the major leagues.

== Professional baseball career ==
=== Minor leagues ===
==== Braves farm system ====
Alomar signed as an amateur free agent with the Milwaukee Braves in 1960. He was assigned to the Class D Davenport Braves in 1961 when he was 17 years old. He played shortstop and had a .278 batting average in 77 games. In 1962, he played for the Class C Boise Braves of the Pioneer League, where he had a .329 batting average while continuing to play shortstop; with three home runs, 83 runs scored and 72 runs batted in (RBIs). He was the Pioneer League's Most Valuable Player. His fielding percentage was below .900 both seasons.

Alomar was promoted to the Double-A Austin Senators in 1963. He hit .292, with five home runs, with 84 runs, 65 RBIs and 15 stolen bases. His fielding percentage improved to .917 at shortstop. The following season he was promoted to the Triple-A Denver Bears of the Pacific Coast League. His fielding percentage at shortstop improved to .944; while batting .263, with 86 runs, 40 RBIs, three homes runs and 20 stolen bases in 34 attempts.

He was called up to the Braves in September 1964 and made his major league debut on September 15, playing shortstop. He had a base hit in his first game, and played 19 total games at shortstop for the Braves in 1964. In 1965, he split the season between the Milwaukee Braves (67 games) and the Triple-A Atlanta Crackers (66 games) and hit below .250 for both teams. He played both shortstop and second base for the Crackers and the Braves.

Alomar played the majority of the 1966 season with the Triple-A Richmond Braves, batting .243 in over 400 plate appearances, and now playing third base as well as at shortstop and second base. The Braves moved to Atlanta in 1966, and Alomar played in 31 games for the Braves at second base and shortstop, batting .091.

==== Mets farm system ====
On February 25, 1967, Alomar became part of an earlier trade between the Braves and Houston Astros that sent Eddie Mathews and Arnold Umbach to Houston for Dave Nicholson and Bob Bruce. Before the 1967 season started, Alomar was traded again to the New York Mets for Derrell Griffith. Alomar played the majority of the 1967 season with the Jacksonville Suns, the Mets' Triple-A affiliate, under manager Bill Virdon, playing principally at shortstop (though he played the other three infield positions as well) and batting only .209. He joined the Mets for 15 games, going hitless in 22 at-bats. Alomar had thought about quitting U.S. baseball when he was told he was a good fielder but could not hit and was sent to the minor leagues that year; but realized he had a family to provide for and continued to play.

=== Winter baseball ===
Alomar played in the Puerto Rican Winter League during most of his minor and major league career.

=== Major leagues ===
==== Chicago White Sox ====
On August 15, 1967, the Mets traded Alomar, Ken Boyer and a player to be named later to the American League's (AL) Chicago White Sox for Bill Southworth and a player to be named later (J.C. Martin). White Sox coach Grover Resinger had coached Alomar in the Braves organization, and believed Alomar was a major league player, recommending him to the White Sox. Alomar played in 12 games for the White Sox that year. In discussing being a member of four different teams in that one year (1967), Alomar later said the year was a nightmare for him, and he felt as if he was being treated "like a piece of garbage".

Alomar played his first full major league season with the White Sox in 1968 (during which Resinger and manager Eddie Stanky were fired). He had a .253 batting average in 133 games with 395 plate appearances. He played mostly at second base, with a .958 fielding percentage, but tied for the most errors by an American League second baseman with Rod Carew (18). He also played third base and shortstop.

==== California Angels ====
Alomar began the 1969 season with the White Sox, playing in 22 games. Alomar's former winter league manager with Ponce in 1968-69, Rocky Bridges, recommended to the Angels that they trade for Alomar. On May 14, 1969, he and pitcher Bob Priddy were traded to the California Angels for second baseman Bobby Knoop. Knoop was a well regarded fielder, but was hitting .179 at the time of the trade, and Alomar had limited playing time with the White Sox. Angels' manager Lefty Phillips showed confidence in Alomar. Alomar became the Angels full-time second baseman, with a .969 fielding percentage. In nearly 600 plate appearances, he hit .250, with 60 runs, 30 RBIs, and 18 stolen bases.

In 1970 Alomar hit .250, with two home runs, a career-high 82 runs, and a career-high tying 162 games played. He received an All-Star berth, with one at bat and two assists in the game. He also led the American League in plate appearances (735). He was third in the AL in stolen bases (35). He had a .979 fielding percentage and led all major league second basemen in double plays (119).

Alomar played in all 162 games again in 1971, leading the major leagues in plate appearances (739) and at bats (689). He hit a full-season career-high .260, to go along with career highs in home runs (4), RBI (42) and stolen bases (39). He was again third highest in the AL in stolen bases. He had a career-high .989 fielding percentage, second best among AL second basemen.

In 1972, Alomar was again the Angels starting second baseman, playing in 155 games. He hit .239 and had over 660 plate appearances for the fourth consecutive year. He had a .979 fielding percentage at second base, and his 154 games at second base were the most by any major league second baseman that year.

Alomar played in 648 consecutive games for the Angels from May 16, 1969, through May 20, 1973, and was known to his teammates as the "Iron Pony". One report stated he did not play on July 28, 1972, but the box score from that date shows that although he did not start that game, he did play in the game. Alomar played in 110 games at second base and 31 at shortstop in 1973, batting .238. He had less than 500 at bats for the first time since joining the Angels.

==== New York Yankees ====
In 1974, he had been replaced by Denny Doyle at second base for the Angels. After playing in only 46 games, with less than 60 at bats, the Angels sold his contract rights to the New York Yankees in early July 1974. He became the Yankees starting second baseman, playing in 76 games. He hit .269, with a .977 fielding percentage at second base. He continued as the Yankees starting second baseman in 1975, batting .239 with 61 runs. He led AL second basemen in fielding percentage in 1975 (.985).

Alomar became a reserve again in 1976, chiefly at second base behind Willie Randolph, but also playing first base, third base, shortstop and the outfield. The Yankees won the AL pennant three games to two over the Kansas City Royals, before losing in four straight games to the Cincinnati Reds in the 1976 World Series. The only postseason at bat of Alomar's career came with the Yankees, during Game 4 of the 1976 American League Championship Series. Alomar came in as a pinch-runner for designated hitter Carlos May in Game 5, and was caught stealing by Royals' catcher Buck Martinez. He was standing on-deck in the bottom of the ninth inning when the Yankees' Chris Chambliss hit the championship series-winning home run in Game 5.

==== Texas Rangers ====
After the 1976 season, the Yankees traded Alomar to the Texas Rangers in exchange for Greg Pryor, Brian Doyle and cash. He played two years for the Rangers as a designated hitter, reserve infielder and occasional reserve outfielder. The Rangers released Alomar after the 1978 season.

=== Career ===
Throughout his career, Alomar was a valuable defensive player. Alomar was able to play all infield and outfield positions. Alomar's offense was below-average with a .245 career batting average, 13 home runs and 282 RBIs in 1,481 games played. He was, however, a great bunter. Alomar was a notable base runner, compiling 227 stolen bases in 307 attempts and occasionally being used as a pinch runner. His 73.941% success rate ranking 304th all-time (through 2024).

== Manager and coach ==
After retiring, Alomar became a manager both in his homeland and the minor leagues. While working in the Chicago Cubs organization, Alomar also managed the San Juan Senators of the Puerto Rican Winter League, including managing his son Roberto. He managed several winter league teams, and was Sandy Jr.'s manager as well as Roberto's. He also managed the Puerto Rican national team. He managed the Rookie League Gulf Coast Cubs from 1995 to 1996. He coached in the majors for the Chicago Cubs (2000–02), Colorado Rockies (2003–04) and San Diego Padres.

Alomar began coaching in the Padres' minor league system in 1984, and in 1985 Alomar coached both of his sons with the Single-A Charleston Rainbows. Alomar was the Padres' third base coach from 1986 to 1990, and coached Sandy Jr. during the son's brief eight games with the Padres in 1988–89, and Roberto who started for the Padres at second base for three years (1988–90).

After the 2004 season, Alomar was hired by the Mets as a bench coach and was moved to first base coach after the 2005 season. In 2007, he was moved to third base coach. On June 17, 2008, Mets manager Willie Randolph was fired. Mets bench coach Jerry Manuel was made manager, and Alomar was once again made bench coach. Following the 2009 season, Alomar was let go by the Mets and replaced by Dave Jauss.

== Legacy and death ==
Alomar and his wife Maria had three children, including sons Sandy Jr. and Roberto Alomar. As children, the two Alomar boys were raised around baseball in Puerto Rico and the United States. Among other things, they played tapeball with Barry Bonds, son of Alomar's 1978 Rangers' teammate Bobby Bonds, in the Rangers' clubhouse. The Alomar sons eventually followed their father into professional baseball, after growing up in Salinas. During his 20-year major league career, Sandy Jr. was a six-time All-Star catcher, who was AL Rookie of the Year in 1990. Younger brother Roberto became a Baseball Hall of Fame second baseman. He was a 12-time All-Star over his 17-year career, a lifetime .300 hitter, and winner of 10 Gold Glove Awards.

Sandy Sr. died in Salinas on October 13, 2025, at the age of 81. He was buried at the Salinas Municipal Cemetery.

== See also ==
- List of Major League Baseball career stolen bases leaders
- List of players from Puerto Rico in Major League Baseball
- List of second-generation Major League Baseball players
