= John Flavin =

American baseball player (born 1942)

- Pitcher
- Born: May 7, 1942 (age 84); Albany, California, U.S.
- Batted: Left Threw: Left

MLB debut
- August 25, 1964, for the Chicago Cubs

Last MLB appearance
- September 13, 1964, for the Chicago Cubs

MLB statistics
- Win–loss record: 0–1
- Earned run average: 13.50
- Strikeouts: 5
- Stats at Baseball Reference

Teams
- Chicago Cubs (1964)

John Thomas Flavin (born May 7, 1942) is an American former professional baseball pitcher who appeared in five games in the major leagues for the Chicago Cubs in 1964. Born in Albany, California, Flavin threw and batted left-handed, stood 6 feet 2 inches (1.88 m) tall and weighed 208 pounds (94 kg). He graduated from El Cerrito High School and attended the University of Southern California.

== Career ==
Flavin entered professional baseball in 1960 in the Cincinnati Reds' organization. After he spent four years in their farm system — including a 12–2 season for Triple-A San Diego in 1962 — Cincinnati sold Flavin's contract to the Cubs in April 1964. Flavin won seven of 12 decisions at Triple-A Salt Lake City, then was recalled to Chicago in August. In his MLB debut, he started against the Houston Colt .45s on August 25, 1964, at Colt Stadium. In 21/3 innings pitched, Flavin allowed six hits, two bases on balls, a wild pitch, and five runs, all earned, before he was relieved by Sterling Slaughter. The Cubs lost the contest, 5–4. The loss was Flavin's only MLB decision.

Flavin made four other appearances for the 1964 Cubs, all in relief. In 42/3 total innings in the majors, he allowed 11 hits, three bases on balls, and seven earned runs; he struck out five.

He missed the 1965 campaign, then appeared in 13 games for Triple-A Tacoma in 1966, his last year in the game.
