= Ron Campbell (baseball) =

American baseball player (1940–2023)

- Infielder
- Born: April 5, 1940; Chattanooga, Tennessee, U.S.
- Died: February 2, 2023 (aged 82); Cleveland, Tennessee, U.S.
- Batted: Right Threw: Right

MLB debut
- September 1, 1964, for the Chicago Cubs

Last MLB appearance
- September 28, 1966, for the Chicago Cubs

MLB statistics
- Batting average: .247
- Home runs: 1
- RBI: 14
- Stats at Baseball Reference

Teams
- Chicago Cubs (1964–1966)

Ronald Thomas Campbell (April 5, 1940 – February 2, 2023) was an American right-handed infielder in Major League Baseball for the Chicago Cubs.

After spending some time at Tennessee Wesleyan College, Campbell was signed by the Cubs as a free agent in 1960. He toiled in the minor leagues for a few seasons before getting his first opportunity with the Cubs on September 1, 1964. After going 0-for-8 in his first two contests, Campbell singled off Cincinnati Reds pitcher John Tsitouris in his first at-bat on September 3, 1964, not only recording his first major league hit, but also his first RBI as teammate Len Gabrielson scored from third to give the Cubs a 1–0 lead. The Cubs went on to win 3–0, giving Campbell credit for the game-winning RBI.

In lieu of Joey Amalfitano, Campbell went on to start at second base for all but two of the Cubs' remaining games that season, sharing the field with future Hall of Famers Billy Williams and Ernie Banks. He hit his first and only major league home run on September 6 of that season against the St. Louis Cardinals' Ray Sadecki. Another highlight of his first month in the majors was collecting his first three-hit game on September 23 against the Los Angeles Dodgers. Campbell finished his brief 1964 campaign with the Cubs with a batting average of .272, six doubles, a triple, a home run, and 10 RBI in just 92 at-bats.

However, 1965 saw Campbell back in the minors for almost the entire season. His only appearances with the Cubs were as a pinch-hitter in each game of a September 12 doubleheader against the San Francisco Giants.

Campbell was with the Cubs for two stints during the 1966 season; first from late June to mid-July, and again from late August through the end of the season. He played both third base and shortstop during this time with the club, spelling Ron Santo and Don Kessinger. However, he did not fare nearly as well as in 1964, batting only .217 with one double, no triples or home runs, and four RBI. On his final day as a major leaguer, Campbell recorded his second and last three-hit game, collecting three singles against the New York Mets on September 28 in the first game of a doubleheader (he went 0-for-4 in the second game, however). He never appeared in the major leagues again.

For his career, Campbell hit .247 with a home run and 14 RBI.

Campbell died February 2, 2023.
