= Bobby Bragan Youth Foundation =

American foundation

- Abbreviation: BBYF
- Headquarters: Fort Worth, TX, United States
- Revenue: $32,659 (2015)
- Expenses: $107,878 (2015)
- Website: www.bobbybragan.com

The Bobby Bragan Youth Foundation (BBYF) was created by Bobby Bragan. From 1992 Bragan has been endeavoring to motivate the youth of the Dallas-Fort Worth Metroplex to become better scholars, citizens, and athletes, and to serve as leaders and role models. This is engineered through the foundation's scholarship program which has awarded $2,000,000+ to 834 outstanding students from public schools across the Dallas-Fort Worth metroplex.

== Program logistics ==
BBYF chooses to recognize students in the eighth grade, just prior to the beginning of their high school education. This early recognition alerts students to the entire scholarship process and motivates them to do well throughout high school as they look toward their college career. In addition, the success of these students creates a positive impact on their peers, inspiring them to do their best and complete high school. In the third quarter of 2006, more than 98% of scholarship recipients had enrolled in college, attending 61 different institutions across the country.

Each year the Bobby Bragan Youth Foundation honors individuals whose contributions have made an impact on their communities. This award, known as the Bobby Bragan Youth Foundation Lifetime Achievement Award has been bestowed upon individuals including Willie Mays, Robert W. (Bobby) Brown, Roger Williams, Lou Brock and Brooks Robinson.

In 2017, the Foundation created the Bobby Bragan Collegiate Slugger Award. The slugger award is a national hitting award for the best hitter in college baseball. Bobby Bragan was a great hitter, so it is fitting that the award given from his foundation be based on hitting performance. The award is also based on academics and personal integrity.
