= Larry Miller (baseball) =

American baseball player (1937–2018)

- Pitcher
- Born: June 19, 1937; Topeka, Kansas, U.S.
- Died: March 21, 2018 (aged 80); Phoenix, Arizona, U.S.
- Batted: Left Threw: Left

MLB debut
- June 21, 1964, for the Los Angeles Dodgers

Last MLB appearance
- September 17, 1966, for the New York Mets

MLB statistics
- Win–loss record: 5–14
- Earned run average: 4.71
- Strikeouts: 93
- Stats at Baseball Reference

Teams
- Los Angeles Dodgers (1964); New York Mets (1965–1966)

Larry Don Miller (June 19, 1937 – March 21, 2018) was an American professional baseball pitcher who appeared in 48 games in Major League Baseball for the Los Angeles Dodgers (1964) and New York Mets (1965–1966). Born in Topeka, he attended the University of Kansas, where he received a Bachelor of Science degree in engineering in 1960. He threw and batted left-handed, stood 6 feet (1.8 m) tall and weighed 195 pounds (88 kg).

Miller signed with the Dodgers in 1959 and spent three years in the club's farm system, and then missed the full 1962 and 1963 seasons while performing United States Army service. After starting 1964 with the Albuquerque Dukes, he was recalled by the Dodgers in June after he went 8–0 with a standout 1.68 earned run average in the Double-A Texas League. He was plugged into the 1964 Dodgers' starting rotation, with 14 starts among his 16 appearances. On August 2, he threw his only MLB complete game, a 6–1 triumph over the first-place Philadelphia Phillies at Connie Mack Stadium. He allowed seven hits and only one base on balls, and fanned five. Overall, as a rookie, he fashioned a 4–8 record and a 4.18 earned run average. Then in October he was swapped to the Mets for outfielder Dick Smith, a former Dodger farmhand. Hurling for the tail-ending Mets, Miller appeared in 32 games (with six starts) over parts of two seasons, but won only one of seven decisions with a poor 5.35 ERA. His final MLB game was September 17, 1966.

Miller's final major league pitching line included a 5–14 won–lost record (for a winning percentage of .263) and an ERA of 4.71. In 1451/3 innings pitched, he allowed 162 hits and 57 walks; he struck out 93.

He then pitched three more seasons at the Triple-A level before leaving the game at age 32 after a nine-year professional baseball career. He settled in the Phoenix area and earned a master's degree in engineering at Arizona State University. He spent three decades as a management consultant on major construction projects. Larry Miller died March 21, 2018, in Phoenix, aged 80.
