= 1960 NAIA World Series =

1960 NAIA baseball tournament
- 1960 NAIA World Series
- Teams: 8
- Format: Double elimination
- Finals site: Soos Park; Sioux City, Iowa
- Champions: Whitworth (1st title)
- Winning coach: Paul Merkel
- MVP: Ray Washburn (P) (Whitworth)

The 1960 NAIA World Series was the fourth annual tournament hosted by the National Association of Intercollegiate Athletics to determine the national champion of baseball among its member colleges and universities in the United States and Canada.

The tournament was played at Soos Park in Sioux City, Iowa.

Whitworth (20-8) defeated Georgia Southern (21-11) in the championship series, 4–0, to win the Pirates' first NAIA World Series.

Whitworth pitcher, and future MLB player and two-time World Series champion with the St. Louis Cardinals, Ray Washburn was named tournament MVP.

== Bracket ==
Upper round 1
Southern	3
Southern Illinois	1
Indiana State (PA)	1
Sam Houston State	6
Georgia Southern	4
Omaha	2
Morningside	4
Whitworth	10

Upper round 2
Southern	10
Sam Houston State	8
Georgia Southern	0
Whitworth	1
Lower round 1
Southern Illinois	1
Indiana State	2
Omaha	8
Morningside	1

Upper final
Southern	0
Whitworth	7
Lower round 2
Georgia Southern	5
Indiana State	2
Omaha	1
Sam Houston State	4

Semifinals
Whitworth	1
Georgia Southern	12
Southern	8
Sam Houston State	6

Preliminary final
Georgia Southern	3
Southern	1

Final
Whitworth	4
Georgia Southern	0

== See also ==
- 1960 NCAA University Division baseball tournament
