= Lou Brock =

American baseball player (1939–2020)

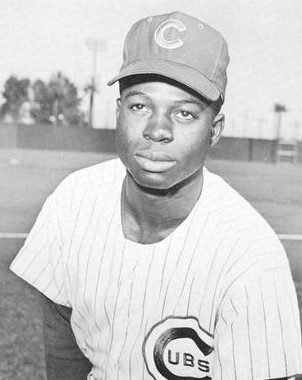
- Brock with the Chicago Cubs in 1964
- Left fielder
- Born: June 18, 1939; El Dorado, Arkansas, U.S.
- Died: September 6, 2020 (aged 81); St. Charles, Missouri, U.S.
- Batted: Left Threw: Left

MLB debut
- September 10, 1961, for the Chicago Cubs

Last MLB appearance
- September 30, 1979, for the St. Louis Cardinals

MLB statistics
- Batting average: .293
- Hits: 3,023
- Home runs: 149
- Runs batted in: 900
- Stolen bases: 938
- Stats at Baseball Reference

Teams
- Chicago Cubs (1961–1964); St. Louis Cardinals (1964–1979)

Career highlights and awards
- 6× All-Star (1967, 1971, 1972, 1974, 1975, 1979); 2× World Series champion (1964, 1967); Roberto Clemente Award (1975); 8× NL stolen base leader (1966–1969, 1971–1974); St. Louis Cardinals No. 20 retired; St. Louis Cardinals Hall of Fame

Member of the National

Baseball Hall of Fame
- Induction: 1985
- Vote: 79.7% (first ballot)
Medals
Men's baseball
Representing United States
Pan American Games
Bronze medal – third place	1959 Chicago	Team

Louis Clark Brock (June 18, 1939 – September 6, 2020) was an American professional baseball left fielder. He began his 19-year Major League Baseball (MLB) career with the 1961 Chicago Cubs but spent most of it as a left fielder for the St. Louis Cardinals. An All-Star for six seasons, Brock was elected to the National Baseball Hall of Fame in 1985 in his first year of eligibility and was inducted into the St. Louis Cardinals Hall of Fame in 2014.

Best known for stealing bases, Brock led the National League (NL) in stolen bases in eight seasons, and set then-major league records for most steals in a single season and in a career. A member of the 3,000-hit club, he batted over .300 in full seasons seven times, and had additional full seasons of .297, .298, and .299. He finished his career with a .304 batting average in 436 plate appearances at age 40 in 1979, compiling a .293 career batting average. Brock led the NL in doubles and triples in 1968, and in singles in 1972. In 1974, he was the runner-up for the NL Most Valuable Player Award. After retiring as a player, he served as a special instructor coach for the Cardinals.

== Early life ==
Louis Clark Brock was born on June 18, 1939, in El Dorado, Arkansas, to a family of sharecroppers. His family moved to Collinston, Louisiana, when he was two years old. While his family did not have much money, he said that he never felt poor because, "If you don't have something, you don't miss it."

Brock grew up as a fan of the Brooklyn Dodgers, a team that included pioneering African-American ballplayers Jackie Robinson, Don Newcombe, and Roy Campanella. Although he did not play in organized baseball until he reached the 11th grade, he learned much about the sport from listening to Cardinals radio broadcaster Harry Caray describe the way major league hitters stood at the plate.

After attending high school in Mer Rouge, Louisiana, he received academic assistance to attend Southern University in Baton Rouge, but when a low grade in his first semester meant the possibility of losing his scholarship, he decided to try out for the school's baseball team in order to secure an athletic scholarship.

== Baseball career ==
=== College and the minor leagues ===
Brock hit for a .189 batting average in his first year of college baseball, but improved the following year to hit .500. Southern University won the National Association of Intercollegiate Athletics (NAIA) baseball championship during his junior year, and Brock was selected for the United States baseball team in the 1959 Pan American Games.

When Brock decided to pursue a professional baseball career, he traveled to St. Louis to try out for the Cardinals, but the scout who had recommended him was in Seattle to sign Ray Washburn. He then decided to try out for the Chicago Cubs, who signed him as an amateur free agent in 1960. Assigned to play for the St. Cloud Rox, Brock won the 1961 Northern League batting championship with a .361 batting average.

=== Chicago Cubs (1961–1964) ===
Brock made his major league debut with the Cubs on September 10, 1961, at the age of 22. In his rookie season of 1962, Brock became one of four players to hit a home run into the center-field bleachers at the old Polo Grounds in New York City since its 1923 reconstruction. His blast came against Al Jackson in the first game of a June 17 doubleheader against the New York Mets and was one of two that cleared the wall in consecutive days, with Hank Aaron's coming the very next day. Joe Adcock was the first to hit a ball over that wall, in 1953. Babe Ruth reached the old bleachers (a comparable distance) before the reconstruction. Brock was not known as a power hitter, though he aspired to be one.

Brock had great speed on the basepaths and in right field. He also had superior base running instincts, but failed to impress Cubs management with his bat. After hitting for only a combined .260 average over his first two seasons, Brock was made part of a mid-season 1964 trade with the St. Louis Cardinals.

The June 15 deadline deal for pitcher Ernie Broglio saw Brock, Jack Spring, and Paul Toth head to St. Louis for Broglio, Bobby Shantz, and Doug Clemens. Cardinals general manager Bing Devine specifically sought Brock at the insistence of Cardinals' manager Johnny Keane to increase team speed and solidify the Cardinals' lineup, which was struggling after the retirement of left fielder Stan Musial in 1963. At the time, many thought the deal was a heist for the Cubs. Broglio had led the National League in wins four years earlier, and had won 18 games the season before the trade.

=== St. Louis Cardinals (1964–1979) ===
After Brock was traded to the Cardinals, his career turned around. He moved to left field and batted .348 and stole 33 bases over the remainder of the 1964 season. At the time of the trade, the Cardinals were 28–31, in eighth place in the National League, trailing even the Cubs, who were 27–27 and in sixth place. Brock helped the Cardinals storm from behind to capture the National League pennant on the last day of the season.

Four months to the day after Brock's trade, the Cardinals won the 1964 World Series in seven games over the favored New York Yankees, who were appearing in their 14th World Series in 16 years (and their last until a dozen years later). Brock's contributions to the Cardinals' championship season were recognized when he finished in tenth place in voting for the 1964 National League Most Valuable Player Award. Meanwhile, Broglio won only seven games for the Chicago Cubs before retiring from baseball after the 1966 season. To this day, the trade of Brock for Broglio is considered one of the most lopsided deals in baseball history.

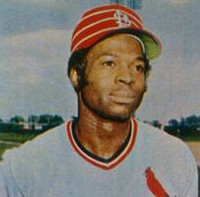
Brock with the Cardinals, c. 1977

In 1966, Brock’s 74 steals ended Maury Wills' six-year reign as the National League's stolen base champion. In his book October 1964, David Halberstam writes that manager Johnny Keane asked Brock to forgo hitting home runs in favor of stealing bases. Brock went on to lead the National League in stolen bases eight times within a nine-year span between 1966 and 1974 (former teammate Bobby Tolan led the league in steals in 1970).

Brock began the 1967 season by hitting five home runs in the first four games of the season, becoming the first player to do so (Barry Bonds tied this record in 2002). He was hitting for a .328 average by mid-June, and earned the start in left field for the National League in the 1967 All-Star Game. After suffering through a mid-season slump, he recovered to finish the season with a career-high 206 hits and a .299 batting average. He topped the NL in runs and stolen bases while helping lead the Cardinals to the National League pennant by ten and a half games.

Brock became the first player in MLB history to steal 50 bases and hit 20 home runs in the same season. He then stormed through the 1967 World Series, hitting for a .414 average, scoring eight runs, and setting a World Series record with seven stolen bases, as the Cardinals defeated the Boston Red Sox in seven games.

The Cardinals won the National League pennant for a second consecutive year in 1968, as Brock once again led the league in stolen bases as well as in doubles and triples. In the 1968 World Series against the Detroit Tigers, Brock had three stolen bases in Game 3 and contributed a double, triple, home run, and four runs batted in Game 4 to help the Cardinals build a three-game to one advantage over the Tigers. Going into the fifth inning of Game 5 with a 3–2 lead, the Cardinals appeared to be on the verge of winning a second consecutive World Series. After Brock had hit a double, he tried to score standing up on Julián Javier's single to left, but Willie Horton threw him out with a strong throw to home plate. Detroit rallied for three runs in the seventh inning as Mickey Lolich shut out the Cardinals for the final eight innings to win the game for the Tigers.

In Game 7, Brock was picked off base by Lolich, extinguishing a possible Cardinals rally. The Tigers rebounded from being down three games to one behind the excellent pitching of Mickey Lolich to win the series. Brock once again stole seven bases and was the leading hitter in the series, posting a .464 batting average with six runs and five runs batted in.

Beginning in 1969, Brock produced six consecutive seasons with 190 hits or better. He was named NL Player of the Month for the first of three times in his career in May 1971 with a .405 batting average and 8 stolen bases. In August 1973, he broke a record set by Ty Cobb when he stole his 50th base of the season, marking the ninth time he had stolen 50 or more bases in a season. Brock won his second NL Player of the Month Award in August 1974, marking one of only four times the award was given to a player who slugged below .500.

In 1972, rather than trying to maximize his lead, the traditional method for setting up a stolen base, Brock pioneered the “rolling start”.

=== Stolen base records ===
On September 10, 1974, Brock tied Wills' single-season stolen bases mark of 104 with a first-inning steal of second base in a game against the visiting Philadelphia Phillies, then broke the record with another swipe of second in the seventh inning. He ended the season with a new major league single-season record of 118 stolen bases. Brock finished second to Steve Garvey in the balloting for the 1974 National League Most Valuable Player Award.

In a game against the San Diego Padres on August 29, 1977, Brock broke Ty Cobb's career record of 892 stolen bases and became the all-time major league stolen base leader. Cobb's record had been one of the most durable in baseball and, like Babe Ruth's record of 714 career home runs, had been considered unbreakable by some observers. Brock held this record until May 31, 1991, when it was broken by Rickey Henderson of the Oakland Athletics, who would go on to steal a total of 1,406 bases.

Brock remained best known for base-stealing and starting Cardinals rallies. He was said to have disliked Wills' method of base-stealing, instead shortening his leads and going hard. He was also an early student of game films. In 1964, Brock acquired a movie camera and filmed opposing pitchers from the dugout to study their windups and pickoff moves to detect weaknesses he could exploit.

=== Later years and retirement ===
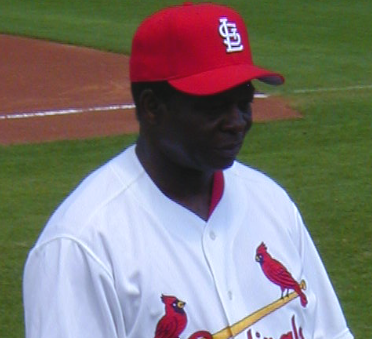
Brock with the Cardinals in spring training in 2005

Brock fell into a hitting slump early in the 1978 season and lost the left fielder's job. However, he fought back during spring training in 1979 with a .345 batting average to regain his starting job. Brock was named Player of the Month in May 1979, when he hit .433.

On August 13, 1979, in a game against the team that traded him, the Chicago Cubs, Brock became the fourteenth Major League Baseball player to garner 3,000 hits. About one month later, Boston Red Sox star and fellow future Hall of Famer Carl Yastrzemski reached the same plateau and was promptly invited to the White House by Massachusetts native and Speaker of the House Tip O'Neill.

Brock was reported to have felt slighted that he hadn't received a similar invitation. After saying that he would not go to the White House even if invited, he reconsidered and accepted a belated invitation from President Jimmy Carter.

Brock posted a .304 batting average, then retired at the end of the season at the age of 40. He was named the National League Comeback Player of the Year — the first player to be so honored in his final Major League season.

== Career statistics ==
In his 19-year major league career, Brock played in 2,616 games and got 3,023 hits in 10,332 at bats, for a .293 career batting average. He accumulated 486 doubles, 141 triples, 149 home runs, 900 RBI, 1,610 runs, 938 stolen bases, 761 bases on balls, and posted a .343 on-base percentage and a .410 slugging percentage.

A six-time All-Star, Brock hit over .300 eight times during his career. He ended his career with a .959 career fielding percentage.

Brock led the National League in stolen bases for a record eight times, and tallied a record 12 consecutive seasons with 50 or more stolen bases. He held both the single-season and all-time major league stolen base records. Both were subsequently broken by Hall of Famer Rickey Henderson, Brock’s 1974 single season mark of 118 in 1982 with 130, and his career record 938 topped in 1991. Brock remains the National League's leader in career stolen bases as of 2026.

Brock's .391 World Series batting average is the highest for anyone who played over 20 Series games. His 14 stolen bases in World Series play are also a Series record. Brock's 13 hits in the 1968 World Series tied a single-series record previously made by Bobby Richardson in 1964 against his Cardinals' team, and was in turn tied in 1986 by Marty Barrett.

== Awards, honors and life after baseball ==
Lou Brock's number 20 was retired by the St. Louis Cardinals in 1979.

In January 1968 he was named the recipient of the Babe Ruth Award as the outstanding player in the 1967 World Series. Brock was honored with The Sporting News Sportsman and Player of the Year Awards in 1974. In the wake of his record-setting 118 stolen bases during the 1974 season, Brock was named the winner of the Roberto Clemente Award in March 1975, for best exemplifying the game of baseball both on and off the field. In 1977 he was awarded the Lou Gehrig Memorial Award as the player who best exemplified Lou Gehrig's ability and character. In 1978, the National League announced that its annual stolen base leader would receive the Lou Brock Award, making Brock the first active player to have an award named after him.

In October 1979, Brock was named the National League's Comeback Player of the Year. In December 1979, he was named as the recipient of the Hutch Award, given to the player who best exemplifies the fighting spirit and competitive desire of Fred Hutchinson. On September 9, 1979, St. Louis retired Brock's jersey number 20, an honor that had been bestowed upon only three other Cardinals: Stan Musial, Dizzy Dean, and Bob Gibson. In 1983, he was inducted into the Louisiana Sports Hall of Fame.

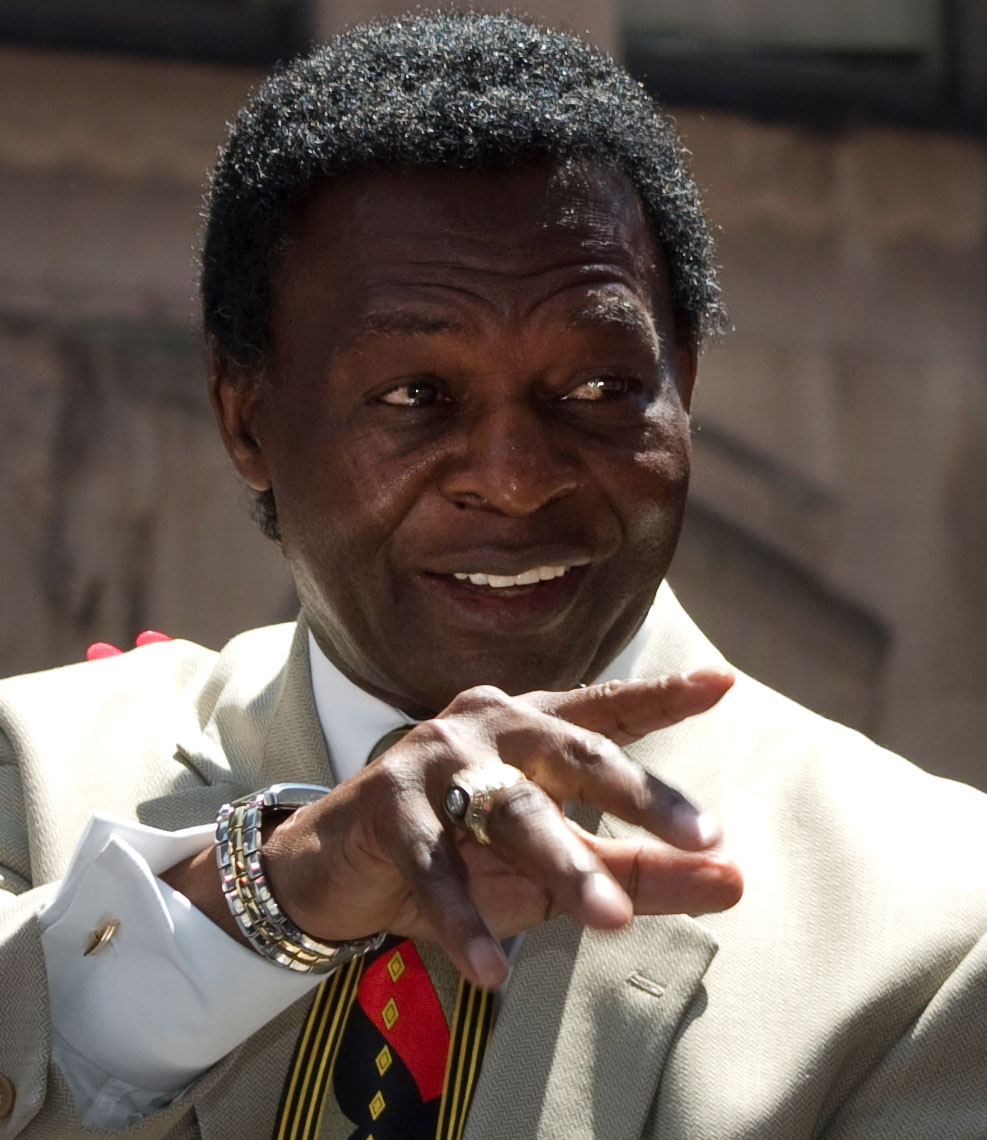
Brock in 2008

Brock was inducted into the Baseball Hall of Fame in 1985, his first year of eligibility. He was inducted into the Missouri Sports Hall of Fame in 1992, the St. Louis Walk of Fame in May 1994, and the Arkansas Sports Hall of Fame in 1995. In 1999, he was ranked Number 58 on The Sporting News' list of the 100 Greatest Baseball Players, and was nominated as a finalist for the Major League Baseball All-Century Team. In 2014, Brock and 21 other former players and personnel were inducted into the new St. Louis Cardinals Hall of Fame Museum.

After retiring from baseball, Brock prospered as a businessman, especially as a florist in the St. Louis area. He briefly worked in 1980 as a color analyst for Monday Night Baseball on ABC, and for Chicago White Sox telecasts the following year. Brock regularly appeared at Cardinals games. When he stepped onto the field he was always greeted by a loud, low-pitched cheer of "Loooouuuuuuuuuuuu". He also lent his name to a unique rainhat shaped like a miniature umbrella, the "Brockabrella", for wearing at games during rainshowers.

During the 1980s and 1990s, Brock was a spring training baserunning instructor with various MLB clubs, including the 1982 Cardinals, 1987 Minnesota Twins, 1988 Los Angeles Dodgers and 1993 Montreal Expos. The first three of those four teams won the World Series.

== Personal life ==
Brock and his wife, Jackie, were both ordained ministers, serving at Abundant Life Fellowship Church in St. Louis, and he was a director on the board of YTB International.

Brock was the father of former University of Southern California Trojan and National Football League player Lou Brock Jr. He is also the granduncle of sports journalist and broadcaster Taylor Rooks.

=== Health ===
Brock's left leg was amputated below the knee in October 2015, because of an infection related to a diabetic condition.

Brock announced on April 13, 2017, that he was diagnosed with multiple myeloma, a blood cancer that starts in the bone marrow's plasma cells. On July 28, 2017, Brock and his wife said they had received word from Mercy Hospital's doctors that according to blood tests the cancerous cells were gone. Brock said the cancer had been declining for some time. "We got reports that it was 25% gone, then 50%, then 75% gone," he said. "The doctors were absolute. [Cancer] is not there."

== Death ==
Brock died on September 6, 2020, at the age of 81.

== Legacy ==
In addition to being inducted into multiple Halls of Fame, including that of Major League Baseball, and being honored by having the sport’s annual stolen base leader award named for him, Brock’s legacy includes having his speed referenced in the song "Check the Rhime" by the pioneering "jazz rap" hip-hop ensemble A Tribe Called Quest, and being recognized for his accomplishments on and off of the field by being granted the Bobby Bragan Youth Foundation Lifetime Achievement Award in 2006.

== See also ==
- List of Major League Baseball annual doubles leaders
- List of Major League Baseball annual runs scored leaders
- List of Major League Baseball annual stolen base leaders
- List of Major League Baseball annual triples leaders
- List of Major League Baseball career doubles leaders
- List of Major League Baseball career runs scored leaders
- List of Major League Baseball career stolen bases leaders
- List of Major League Baseball career total bases leaders
- List of Major League Baseball career triples leaders
- List of Major League Baseball players to hit for the cycle
- List of Major League Baseball stolen base records
- List of St. Louis Cardinals team records
- Major League Baseball titles leaders

Awards and achievements
Preceded by Willie Stargell; Don Gullett; George Foster	National League Player of the Month; May 1971; August 1974; May 1979	Succeeded by Willie Stargell; Joe Morgan; George Foster
Preceded by Maury Wills	Major League Baseball single season stolen base record holder 1974–1982	Succeeded by Rickey Henderson
Preceded by Richie Zisk	Hitting for the cycle May 27, 1975	Succeeded by Tim Foli
