= Gary Kolb =

American baseball player (1940–2019)

- Outfielder
- Born: March 13, 1940; Rock Falls, Illinois, U.S.
- Died: July 3, 2019 (aged 79); Charleston, West Virginia, U.S.
- Batted: Left Threw: Right

MLB debut
- September 7, 1960, for the St. Louis Cardinals

Last MLB appearance
- September 1, 1969, for the Pittsburgh Pirates

MLB statistics
- Batting average: .209
- Home runs: 6
- Runs batted in: 29
- Stats at Baseball Reference

Teams
- St. Louis Cardinals (1960, 1962–1963); Milwaukee Braves (1964–1965); New York Mets (1965); Pittsburgh Pirates (1968–1969)

Gary Alan Kolb (March 13, 1940 – July 3, 2019) was an American professional baseball player. An outfielder and utilityman, Kolb played all or parts of seven seasons (1960; 1962–65; 1968–69) of Major League Baseball with the St. Louis Cardinals, Milwaukee Braves, New York Mets and Pittsburgh Pirates. He threw right-handed, batted left-handed, stood 6 ft 0 in (1.83 m) tall and weighed 194 lb (88 kg).

Kolb signed with the Cardinals in 1960 after attending the University of Illinois at Urbana–Champaign. He spent much of the 1963 season with the Cardinals and batted .271 in 96 at bats. On September 29, 1963, he came in as a pinch-runner, replacing Stan Musial after Musial's final career hit. He was traded to the Braves on the eve of the 1964 campaign for catcher Bob Uecker. In part-time service over the rest of his MLB career his batting average never exceeded .218. He was a versatile performer who appeared at every position except shortstop and pitcher at the big league level (although he played every position in the minor leagues).

In his seven-season Major League career, Kolb batted .209 with six home runs and 29 runs batted in. He was the last Cardinal to wear uniform #20 before Baseball Hall of Fame outfielder Lou Brock, who was acquired two months after Kolb's trade in 1964. The number has since been retired in Brock's honor. Kolb collected his last base hit and two RBIs in his final major league at-bat when he singled in the 8th inning on September 1, 1969.

Kolb died on July 3, 2019.
