= Corky Withrow =

American baseball player (1937–2026)

- Outfielder
- Born: November 28, 1937; Boone County, West Virginia, U.S.
- Died: April 22, 2026 (aged 88); Owensboro, Kentucky, U.S.
- Batted: Right Threw: Right

MLB debut
- September 6, 1963, for the St. Louis Cardinals

Last MLB appearance
- September 28, 1963, for the St. Louis Cardinals

MLB statistics
- Batting average: .000
- At bats: 9
- Runs batted in: 1
- Stats at Baseball Reference

Teams
- St. Louis Cardinals (1963)

Raymond Wallace "Corky" Withrow (November 28, 1937 – April 22, 2026) was an American professional baseball player. He played six games in Major League Baseball in 1963 for the St. Louis Cardinals, four as a pinch hitter and two as an outfielder. He threw and batted right-handed, and was listed during his playing career at 6 feet 3 inches (1.91 m) tall and 197 pounds (89 kg).

== Biography ==
Withrow grew up in Central City, Kentucky, and graduated from Central City High School there in 1956, at which time he signed with the Milwaukee Braves. While playing minor league baseball, he attended Georgetown College of Kentucky, where he played basketball, then transferred to Kentucky Wesleyan College in 1958.

In the minors, Withrow was a power-hitting outfielder, hitting 34 home runs in the Class D New York–Penn League (1958), 34 homers in the Double-A Texas League (1962), and 29 more in the Triple-A Pacific Coast League (1963). Acquired by the Cardinals from the Denver Bears in September 1963, Withrow made his debut as a pinch hitter for St. Louis pitcher Ron Taylor in the sixth inning on September 6 and was called out on strikes by left-hander Bob Veale of the Pittsburgh Pirates. He started his only MLB game the following day against another southpaw, Joe Gibbon, and recorded his only major league run batted in on a fielder's choice. Altogether, he went hitless in six games played and nine at bats during his brief major league career.

He played in 1,128 minor league games from 1956 through 1966, and batted .260 lifetime.

Withrow died in Owensboro, Kentucky, on April 22, 2026, at the age of 88.
