= Bud Bloomfield =

American baseball player (1936–2011)

- Second baseman / Shortstop / Third baseman
- Born: January 5, 1936; Oklahoma City, Oklahoma, U.S.
- Died: December 21, 2011 (aged 75); Huntsville, Arkansas, U.S.
- Batted: Right Threw: Right

MLB debut
- September 25, 1963, for the St. Louis Cardinals

Last MLB appearance
- June 22, 1964, for the Minnesota Twins

MLB statistics
- Batting average: .143
- Home runs: 0
- Runs batted in: 0
- Stats at Baseball Reference

Teams
- St. Louis Cardinals (1963); Minnesota Twins (1964)

Clyde Stalcup "Bud" Bloomfield (January 5, 1936 – December 21, 2011) was an American professional baseball player. A backup infielder, he had an eight-year career in minor league baseball, interrupted by brief Major League appearances for the 1963 St. Louis Cardinals (one game) and 1964 Minnesota Twins (seven games). He batted and threw right-handed, stood 5 feet 11 inches (1.80 m) tall and weighed 170 pounds (77 kg) as an active player.

Born in Oklahoma City, Oklahoma, Bloomfield attended the University of Tulsa and the University of Arkansas before signing with the Cardinals. He spent three minor league seasons (1961–63) in his native Oklahoma as a member of the Double-A Tulsa Oilers. In Bloomfield's Major League debut — and his only Cardinal appearance — he was a defensive replacement for star Cardinal third baseman Ken Boyer in a 5–2 victory over the Chicago Cubs at Wrigley Field. Bloomfield was in the on-deck circle when the Redbirds made their final out of the game, and did not record a plate appearance.

Drafted by the Twins during the off-season, Bloomfield spent most of the 1964 season with the Triple-A Atlanta Crackers. He started two games for the Twins as a second baseman on May 7–8. In the former, he collected his only MLB hit, a single off Fred Newman of the Los Angeles Angels. Bloomfield retired after the 1964 season.

Bloomfield died in 2011 in Huntsville, Arkansas, at the age of 75.
