= Johnny Werhas =

American baseball player (born 1938)

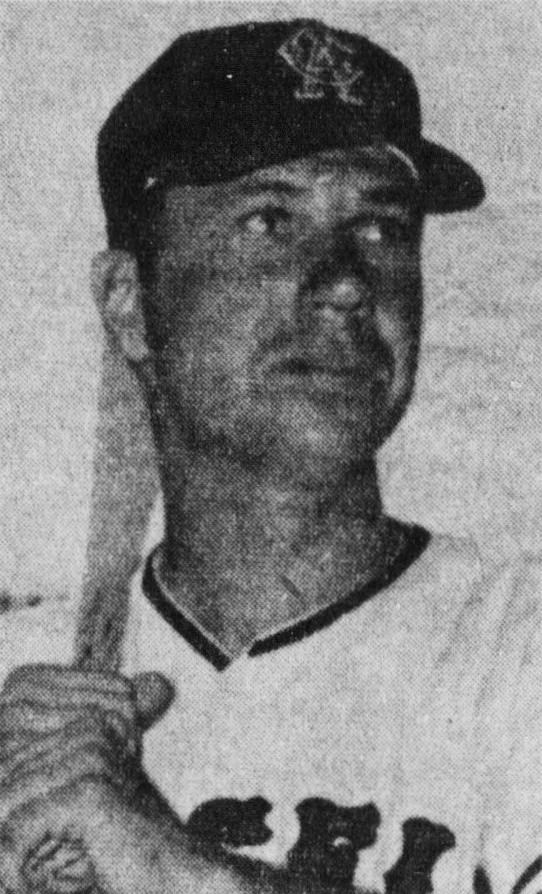
- Werhas, circa 1967
- Third baseman
- Born: February 7, 1938 (age 88); Highland Park, Michigan, U.S.
- Batted: Right Threw: Right

MLB debut
- April 14, 1964, for the Los Angeles Dodgers

Last MLB appearance
- September 30, 1967, for the California Angels

MLB statistics
- Batting average: .173
- Home runs: 2
- Runs scored: 15
- Stats at Baseball Reference

Teams
- Los Angeles Dodgers (1964–1967); California Angels (1967)

John Charles Werhas (born February 7, 1938) is an American former Major League Baseball third baseman who was a pastor for The Rock Community Church in Anaheim Hills, California. He retired from this position on August 23, 2015, and moved to Oregon to spend time with his wife of many years.

Werhas was an All-American third baseman for the University of Southern California Trojans baseball team. He also played forward for the Trojans basketball team, earning All-PCC honors and honorable-mention All-American recognition in 1959. He was inducted into the school's Hall of Fame in 2007.

Werhas was drafted by the NBA's Los Angeles Lakers in 1960, however, chose to sign with the Los Angeles Dodgers instead. He batted .248 with 26 home runs and 127 runs batted in through three seasons in the minors before having a breakthrough 1963 season with the Spokane Indians. He edged out Ken McMullen for the Dodgers' starting third base job out of spring training 1964. After batting just .169 with eight RBIs through the first 33 games of the season, however, he was displaced by Jim Gilliam, who started the season playing second base. Werhas enjoyed a career game shortly after losing his starting job on May 28, going three-for-four with a walk and run scored in a seventeen-inning marathon with the Cincinnati Reds that ended in a 2–2 tie, but was soon returned to Spokane, regardless. He batted .309 with nine home runs and 51 RBIs for Spokane.

He returned to the Dodgers when rosters expanded in September 1965, going hitless with one walk and a run scored in three pinch hit plate appearances. The only time Werhas took the field was at first base in the final game of the season.

He earned a back-up job in 1967, but was dealt to the California Angels on May 10 for outfielder Len Gabrielson. On June 4, he hit his first major league home run off the Minnesota Twins' Jim Merritt. His only other major league home run came later that month against the Cleveland Indians' Sam McDowell.

Werhas' final major league at bat came with the Angels that season. He remained with the organization through 1970 before heading to Japan in 1971 to play for the Taiyo Whales. In the first trade between a Japanese and an American team, he was dealt to the San Diego Padres' Pacific Coast League affiliate, the Hawaii Islanders, for longtime major leaguer Clete Boyer. He retired following the 1973 season.

Werhas and his wife, Kay, have two children. His daughter is married to former Minnesota Twins and New York Yankees pitcher Dan Naulty.
