= Jonas Umbach =

German painter, designer, and engraver

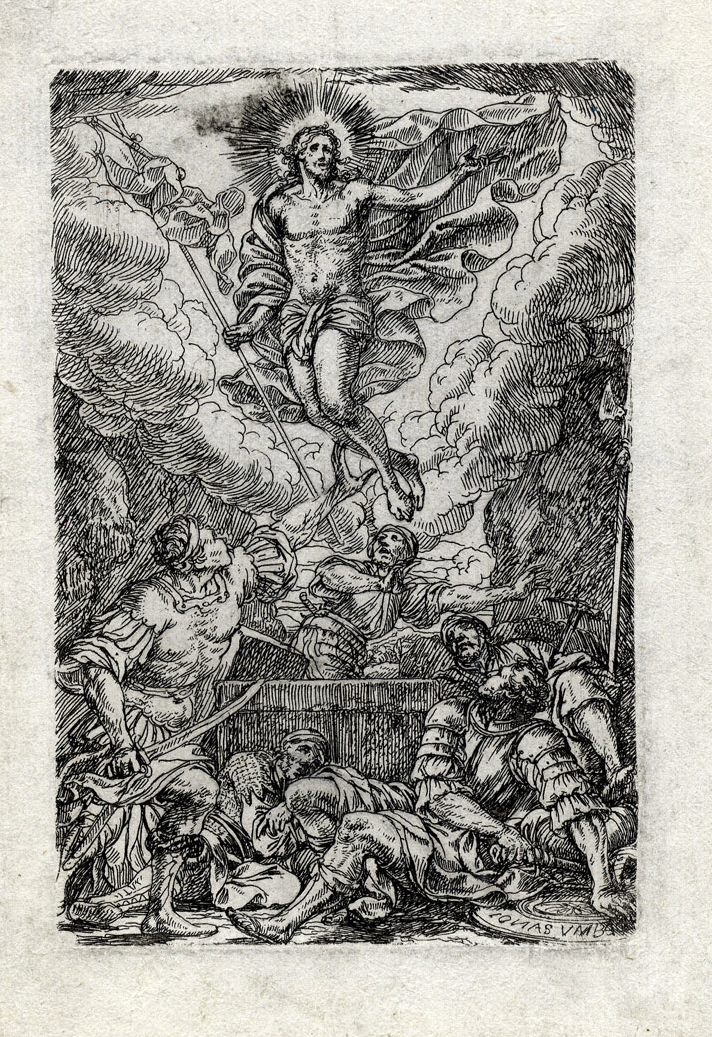
Resurrection of Christ, copper engraving by Jonas Umbach

Jonas Umbach (c. 1624–1693) was a German painter, designer, and engraver. Born in Augsburg, he became cabinet painter to the Bishop of Augsburg, and produced many landscapes with cattle; also kitchen pieces, feathered game, and a few historical subjects in chiaroscuro. He also etched 230 plates of biblical, historical, and mythological scenes and landscapes. Among these there are:

- Christ on the Mount of Olives
- Trains of Children and Nereids
- Two Duck-shooters lying in Wait
- Landscapes with Ruins
- Bacchanals and Infant Sports

He died in Augsburg in 1693.

There was a younger Jonas Umbach, but there are no particulars respecting him, except that he drew portraits.
