= Bart Shirley =

American baseball player (1940–2025)

- Infielder
- Born: January 4, 1940; Corpus Christi, Texas, U.S.
- Died: November 19, 2025 (aged 85); Corpus Christi, Texas, U.S.
- Batted: Right Threw: Right

Professional debut
- MLB: September 14, 1964, for the Los Angeles Dodgers
- NPB: April 10, 1971, for the Chunichi Dragons

Last appearance
- MLB: September 29, 1968, for the Los Angeles Dodgers
- NPB: October 3, 1972, for the Chunichi Dragons

MLB statistics
- Batting average: .203
- Home runs: 0
- Run batted in: 11

NPB statistics
- Batting average: .183
- Home runs: 15
- Run batted in: 79
- Stats at Baseball Reference

Teams
- Los Angeles Dodgers (1964, 1966); New York Mets (1967); Los Angeles Dodgers (1968); Chunichi Dragons (1971–1972)

Barton Arvin Shirley (January 4, 1940 – November 19, 2025) was an American professional baseball player who was an infielder in Major League Baseball. He played in 75 games in four seasons (1964, 1966–1968) for the Los Angeles Dodgers and New York Mets. He also played in Japan for two seasons with the Chunichi Dragons in 1971–1972.

From 1973 to 1975, he managed in Class-A minor leagues for the Dodgers.

Shirley died after a long illness in Corpus Christi, Texas, on November 19, 2025, at the age of 85.
