= Wayne Schurr =

American baseball player (1937–2024)

- Pitcher
- Born: August 6, 1937; Garrett, Indiana, U.S.
- Died: March 29, 2024 (aged 86); Angola, Indiana, U.S.
- Batted: Right Threw: Right

MLB debut
- April 15, 1964, for the Chicago Cubs

Last MLB appearance
- July 11, 1964, for the Chicago Cubs

MLB statistics
- Win–loss record: 0–0
- Earned run average: 3.72
- Strikeouts: 29
- Stats at Baseball Reference

Teams
- Chicago Cubs (1964)

Wayne Allen Schurr (August 6, 1937 – March 29, 2024) was an American Major League Baseball relief pitcher who appeared in 26 games for the Chicago Cubs in 1964. The native of Garrett, Indiana, was a right-hander listed as 6 feet 4 inches (1.93 m) tall and 185 pounds (84 kg).

Schurr attended Hillsdale College in Michigan. His eight-season professional baseball career began when he signed with the San Francisco Giants as an amateur free agent in 1959. Acquired by the Cubs in the 1963 Rule 5 draft, Schurr spent the first three months of the 1964 campaign in the major leagues. He did not earn a decision or a save, and posted a 3.72 earned run average. In 481/3 innings pitched, he permitted 57 hits and 11 bases on balls, with 29 strikeouts. On May 29 at Wrigley Field, Schurr threw 51/3 scoreless innings in relief against the Milwaukee Braves before exiting the game for a pinch hitter; his effort enabled the Cubs to stay close in a ballgame they would eventually lose 6–5.

Schurr retired from baseball after the 1966 minor-league season. He died in Angola, Indiana on March 29, 2024, at the age of 86.
