= Lee Gregory (baseball) =

American baseball player (born 1938)

- Pitcher
- Born: June 2, 1938 (age 88); Bakersfield, California, U.S.
- Batted: Left Threw: Left

MLB debut
- April 17, 1964, for the Chicago Cubs

Last MLB appearance
- September 11, 1964, for the Chicago Cubs

MLB statistics
- Earned run average: 3.50
- Record: 0-0
- Strikeouts: 8
- Stats at Baseball Reference

Teams
- Chicago Cubs (1964)

Grover Leroy Gregory (born June 2, 1938) is an American former Major League Baseball pitcher and pinch hitter who played for the Chicago Cubs in 1964. Gregory was born on June 2, 1938, in Bakersfield, California. He was 6'1", 180 pounds, and he threw and batted left-handed. Gregory attended Fresno State University.

Before the 1959 season, Gregory was signed by the St. Louis Cardinals. He spent time in the minors, was released, and before the 1964 season was signed by the Cubs. On April 17, 1964, he made his big league debut at the age of 25 wearing number 28. In 11 games, he pitched 18 innings for a 3.50 ERA. He did not have a decision. He was also used as a pinch hitter. In 13 at-bats, he collected 1 hit for a .077 average. Gregory played his final game on September 11, 1964.

Gregory currently resides in Fresno, California.
