= Jake Jaeckel =

American baseball player (1942–2019)

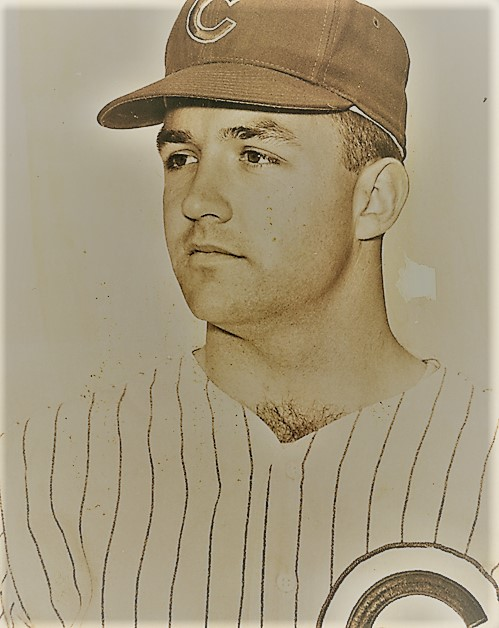
- Pitcher
- Born: April 1, 1942; East Los Angeles, California, U.S.
- Died: March 31, 2019 (aged 76); Pomona, California, U.S.
- Batted: Right Threw: Right

MLB debut
- September 19, 1964, for the Chicago Cubs

Last MLB appearance
- October 2, 1964, for the Chicago Cubs

MLB statistics
- Pitching Record: 1-0
- Earned run average: 0.00
- Strikeouts: 2
- Stats at Baseball Reference

Teams
- Chicago Cubs (1964)

Paul Henry Jaeckel (April 1, 1942 – March 31, 2019) was an American professional baseball pitcher who appeared in four games, for the Chicago Cubs, in 1964.

== Career ==
Jaeckel graduated from La Puente High School in 1960, where he played primarily SS and P. He was signed directly out of High School, by the Cubs, playing in their minor league system four seasons before being called up in 1964. He pitched well, for the Cubs, in four games, for the Cubs, facing and retiring players that included multi-time All-Stars Dennis Menke, Felipe Alou, Ron Fairley, Tommy Davis , Wally Moon, Jim Davenport, Tom Haller, Harvey Keun and Hall of Famers Eddie Mathews, Orlando Cepeda and Joe Torre without giving up a run. He injured his rotator cuff, in the Spring of 1965. He played injured, spending the next three seasons in the Cubs minor league system, before finally retiring due to the persistent rotator cuff issues.

After retirement Jaeckel continued to be involved in baseball by participating in events held by the Major League Players Alumni Association, including clinics and camps. He also provided pitching lessons at Cairas Cages, in Chino California.

== Personal life ==
Jaeckel married his high school sweetheart Georgeann Clarke and the two remained together for over 55 years, until his death. Paul and Georgeann Jaeckel lived in Claremont California for over 40 years.
