= John Braun (baseball) =

American baseball player (1939-2011)

- Pitcher
- Born: December 26, 1939; Madison, Wisconsin, U.S.
- Died: June 10, 2011 (aged 71); Oceanside, California, U.S.
- Batted: Right Threw: Right

MLB debut
- October 2, 1964, for the Milwaukee Braves

Last MLB appearance
- October 2, 1964, for the Milwaukee Braves

MLB statistics
- Win–loss record: 0–0
- Earned run average: 0.00
- Strikeouts: 1
- Stats at Baseball Reference

Teams
- Milwaukee Braves (1964)

John Paul Braun (December 26, 1939 – June 10, 2011) was an American professional baseball pitcher who appeared in one game in Major League Baseball for the Milwaukee Braves in 1964. Braun threw and batted right-handed, stood 6 feet 5 inches (1.96 m) tall and weighed 218 pounds (99 kg). He was born in Madison, Wisconsin.

Braun graduated from Madison West High School in 1957, where he played baseball, football and basketball. After high school, Braun played college basketball for the Chipola Indians before transferring to the University of Wisconsin.

His pro baseball career lasted five seasons (1960–1961, 1963–1965), all of them in the Braves' system. In his only MLB appearance, on October 2, 1964 at Milwaukee County Stadium, he threw two shutout innings of relief against the Pittsburgh Pirates, allowed two hits and one base on balls, and struck out one — victimizing Baseball Hall of Famer and four-time National League batting champion Roberto Clemente on a called third strike.
