= Derrell Griffith =

American baseball player (1943–2026)

- Outfielder, third baseman
- Born: December 12, 1943; Anadarko, Oklahoma, U.S.
- Died: June 25, 2026 (aged 82); Anadarko, Oklahoma, U.S.
- Batted: Left Threw: Right

MLB debut
- September 26, 1963, for the Los Angeles Dodgers

Last MLB appearance
- June 28, 1966, for the Los Angeles Dodgers

MLB statistics
- Batting average: .260
- Home runs: 5
- Runs scored: 33
- Stats at Baseball Reference

Teams
- Los Angeles Dodgers (1963–1966)

Robert Derrell Griffith (December 12, 1943 – June 25, 2026) was an American professional baseball player. The outfielder and third baseman appeared in 124 games played in Major League Baseball for the Los Angeles Dodgers over parts of four seasons (1963–1966). Griffith was born in Anadarko, Oklahoma. He batted left-handed, threw right-handed, and was listed as 6 feet (1.8 m) tall and 168 pounds (76 kg).

Griffith graduated from high school in his hometown and attended Southwestern Oklahoma State University. He signed with the Dodgers before the 1962 season and posted solid offensive statistics in levels from Class B to Triple-A. After a one-game stint with Los Angeles in September 1963, he was recalled by the Dodgers for an extended stay in MLB in June 1964. He started 35 games at third base and another 27 in the outfield for the 1964 Dodgers and batted .290 with five three-hit games. His 69 total hits included 16 doubles and four home runs.

But 1964 was Griffith's only sustained service and period of success in the majors. In 1965, he was moved to left field in May when regular Tommy Davis broke an ankle. Griffith was batting .133 in nine games started when he lost the regular job to Lou Johnson and he returned to Triple-A for the heart of the regular season. Then, in 1966, he sustained a shoulder injury that hindered him for the rest of his career. Griffith kept the injury a secret for almost 50 years until revealing it in an interview on an Oklahoma City television station in May 2015. He collected only one more major league hit in 1966 before returning to the minors.

The Dodgers then packaged Griffith (with Tommy Davis) in a four-player trade to the New York Mets after the 1966 season, but he failed to stick with the Mets, and spent 1967, his last year in pro ball, in the minors in the Houston Astros' and Atlanta Braves' organizations.

As a major leaguer, Griffith collected 77 career hits, batting .260 with five homers and 33 runs batted in. As of 2015, he owned and operated a liquor store in Anadarko.
