= Len Gabrielson =

American baseball player (born 1940)

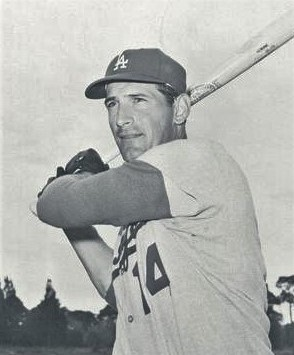
- Outfielder
- Born: February 14, 1940 (age 86); Oakland, California, U.S.
- Batted: Left Threw: Right

MLB debut
- September 9, 1960, for the Milwaukee Braves

Last MLB appearance
- September 30, 1970, for the Los Angeles Dodgers

MLB statistics
- Batting average: .253
- Home runs: 37
- Runs batted in: 176
- Stats at Baseball Reference

Teams
- Milwaukee Braves (1960, 1963–1964); Chicago Cubs (1964–1965); San Francisco Giants (1965–1966); California Angels (1967); Los Angeles Dodgers (1967–1970)

Leonard Gary Gabrielson (born February 14, 1940) is an American former professional baseball outfielder. He graduated from the University of Southern California and played in Major League Baseball (MLB) from 1960 through 1970, initially signing with the Milwaukee Braves in 1959 as an amateur free agent.

After parts of three seasons with the Braves, he was traded to the Chicago Cubs on June 3, 1964, in exchange for catcher Merritt Ranew and $40,000. Two weeks later, the Cubs traded their starting right fielder Lou Brock to the St. Louis Cardinals, and installed Gabrielson as Brock's replacement.

He lasted less than a year with the Cubs, moving on to the San Francisco Giants in a five-player deal on May 29, 1965. The Giants received Gabrielson and catcher Dick Bertell, in return for Harvey Kuenn and Ed Bailey and pitcher Bob Hendley. Gabrielson gradually worked his way into a role as the team's starting left fielder, a role he successfully defended in spring training of 1966, beating back a challenge by Orlando Cepeda, who had been displaced from first base by Willie McCovey. He struggled with the bat that season, however, and in December was traded to the California Angels for first baseman Norm Siebern.

Gabrielson's stay with the Angels lasted all of eleven games, as the Angels sent him to the Los Angeles Dodgers for Johnny Werhas on May 10, 1967. It would be the final trade of Gabrielson's career, as he spent the next four seasons with Los Angeles. He led the team in home runs with ten in 1968, an unusually low total made possible by league-wide offensive declines that season, the so-called "Year of the Pitcher".

His father, Leonard Hilbourne Gabrielson, was also an MLB player, having spent part of the 1939 season with the Philadelphia Phillies.

== See also ==
- List of second-generation Major League Baseball players
