= Arnold Umbach =

American baseball player (1942–2020)

- Pitcher
- Born: December 6, 1942; Williamsburg, Virginia, U.S.
- Died: May 30, 2020 (aged 77); Auburn, Alabama, U.S.
- Batted: Right Threw: Right

MLB debut
- October 3, 1964, for the Milwaukee Braves

Last MLB appearance
- July 19, 1966, for the Atlanta Braves

MLB statistics
- Win–loss record: 1–2
- Earned run average: 3.12
- Strikeouts: 30
- Stats at Baseball Reference

Teams
- Milwaukee/Atlanta Braves (1964, 1966)

Arnold William Umbach Jr. (December 6, 1942 – May 30, 2020) was an American professional baseball pitcher who appeared in parts of two seasons in Major League Baseball for the 1964 Milwaukee Braves and the 1966 Atlanta Braves. A right-hander whose pro career extended from 1961 through 1968, he was listed as 6 feet 1 inch (1.85 m) tall and 180 pounds (82 kg).

Umbach was born in Williamsburg, Virginia, but grew up in Auburn, Alabama; he graduated from Tennessee's Baylor School, then later returned to his home city to earn a degree from Auburn University. Fresh off his schoolboy career, he signed a $100,000 bonus contract with the Braves in June 1961. After four seasons in the club's farm system, he was called up to Milwaukee in September 1964 and given a start in the club's next-to-last game of the season, October 3 against the Pittsburgh Pirates at County Stadium. He went 81/3 innings and departed with an 11–3 lead after surrendering 11 hits and four bases on balls. Two unearned runs would score off Umbach's successor on the mound, Baseball Hall of Fame southpaw Warren Spahn (in Spahn's 714th and final appearance in a Brave uniform), but Umbach secured the victory in his MLB debut. After spending 1965 at Triple-A, Umbach worked in 22 games during 1966, the Braves' first year in Atlanta, losing his only two decisions but posting a solid 3.10 earned run average. Of his 22 appearances, three were starts, and on June 4, he held the St. Louis Cardinals to seven hits and one unearned run, again going 81/3 innings. But he departed the game with the score tied at one, and his reliever, veteran Ted Abernathy, got credit for the victory when Atlanta broke through with the winning tally in the home half of the ninth.

Umbach appeared in 23 MLB games, and fashioned a 1–2 won–lost record. He permitted 51 hits and 22 bases on balls in 49 career innings pitched, with 30 strikeouts. After the 1966 season, he was included in a blockbuster trade that sent longtime Braves star Eddie Mathews, also a future Hall of Famer, to the Houston Astros. But Umbach never appeared in a Houston uniform and retired after only two Double-A appearances in 1968.

In addition to Auburn University, Umbach attended law school at the University of Alabama and Emory University and after his pitching career ended he was a practicing attorney in his home city of Auburn. He died at his home there on May 30, 2020, due to complications from Parkinson's disease.
