= Ray Washburn =

American baseball player (born 1938)

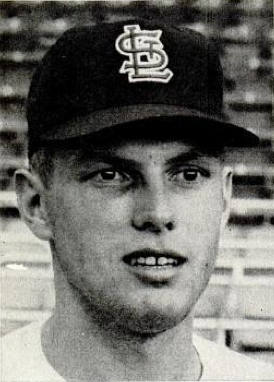
- Washburn in 1962.
- Pitcher
- Born: May 31, 1938 (age 88); Pasco, Washington, U.S.
- Batted: Right Threw: Right

MLB debut
- September 20, 1961, for the St. Louis Cardinals

Last MLB appearance
- October 1, 1970, for the Cincinnati Reds

MLB statistics
- Win–loss record: 72–64
- Earned run average: 3.53
- Strikeouts: 700
- Stats at Baseball Reference

Teams
- St. Louis Cardinals (1961–1969); Cincinnati Reds (1970)

Career highlights and awards
- 2× World Series champion (1964, 1967); Pitched a no-hitter on September 18, 1968

Ray Clark Washburn (born May 31, 1938) is an American former professional baseball pitcher. He played in Major League Baseball (MLB) for the St. Louis Cardinals from 1961 to 1969 and the Cincinnati Reds in 1970.

== Baseball career ==
Washburn was born in Pasco, Washington and was a 1961 graduate of Whitworth University, whom he led to the 1960 NAIA World Series title and was named tournament Most Valuable Player; he struck out 37 batters in this Series, a record tied by Clyde Wright in 1965. Washburn, a $50,000 "bonus baby," went 12–9 with the Cardinals as a rookie in 1962. A shoulder muscle tear midway into the 1963 season sidelined him for the remainder of the year and limited his effectiveness for the next two years afterwards. Relying mostly on a curveball, Washburn returned to the starting rotation in 1966, winning 11 games against 9 losses; in 1967, he won 10 games against 7 losses on a Cardinal team that won the World Series, defeating the Boston Red Sox in seven games. He had missed nearly a month of action that season after his thumb was dislocated by a John Roseboro line drive single on June 21.

1968, the "Year of the Pitcher," was Washburn's best season; he posted a 14–8 record with a 2.26 earned run average in a Bob Gibson-led rotation as the Cardinals repeated as National League champions. The wins and ERA were a career best, as was his strikeout total (124). Washburn also no-hit the San Francisco Giants 2–0 at Candlestick Park on September 18 of that year; the no-hitter was the first by a Cardinal since Lon Warneke in 1941 and came one day after the Giants’ Gaylord Perry had pitched a no-hitter of his own, defeating the Cardinals and Gibson—the first time in Major League history that back-to-back no-hitters had been pitched in the same series. Washburn struck out eight batters and allowed only two fly ball outs, the second of which was Willie McCovey's for the game's final out. In Game 3 of the World Series against the Detroit Tigers, Washburn allowed home runs to Al Kaline and Dick McAuliffe but only two hits otherwise, and defeated the Tigers 7–3. However, he was shelled in Game 6, giving up five runs in two innings, the last three coming in a record-tying 10-run third inning for the Tigers, who won the game 13–1. The Cardinals then lost Game 7 the very next day, and with it the Series, which they had been leading 3 games to 1.

Washburn slumped to 3–8 as a spot starter during the 1969 season, after which the Cardinals traded him to the Cincinnati Reds for another 1968 no-hit pitcher, George Culver. Washburn pitched mostly in relief on a Reds team that won the 1970 National League pennant, its first in nine years. His last Major League appearance was in the final game of that year's World Series, in which the Baltimore Orioles defeated the Reds in five games.

In his career, Washburn won 72 games and lost 64 with a 3.53 earned run average and struck out 700 batters in 1209 2/3 innings pitched.

== Later years ==
In 1972, Washburn managed the Seattle Rainiers, a co-op team in the Class A Northwest League, before accepting a teaching position the following year at Bellevue Community College. On nights and weekends, Washburn earned a masters of education administration degree at Seattle University. Eventually, he became chairman of the department of physical education and athletic director at Bellevue College. He retired from full-time duties in 2003. Washburn also coached the baseball program there for 12 years. He continued to teach part-time at the school, which became Bellevue College. Washburn is a member of the NAIA Hall of Fame, the Inland Empire Hall of Fame, and the Washington State Sports Hall of Fame.

Preceded by Gaylord Perry	No-hitter pitcher September 18, 1968	Succeeded by Bill Stoneman
