= Sterling Slaughter =

American baseball player (born 1941)

- Pitcher
- Born: November 18, 1941 (age 84); Danville, Illinois, U.S.
- Batted: Right Threw: Right

MLB debut
- April 19, 1964, for the Chicago Cubs

Last MLB appearance
- September 13, 1964, for the Chicago Cubs

MLB statistics
- Win–loss record: 2–4
- Earned run average: 5.75
- Strikeouts: 32
- Stats at Baseball Reference

Teams
- Chicago Cubs (1964)

Sterling Feore Slaughter Jr. (born November 18, 1941) is an American former professional baseball player who pitched for the Chicago Cubs of Major League Baseball in 1964. Slaughter stood 5 feet 11 inches (1.80 m) tall, weighed 165 pounds (75 kg) and graduated from Arizona State University with a degree in education in 1963.

In 1963, he had led the Double-A Texas League in earned run average (3.00). In 1964 he appeared in 20 Major League games pitched, six as a starting pitcher, and won two of six decisions, giving up 64 hits and 32 bases on balls in 51 2/3 innings pitched. He also recorded 32 strikeouts.

Both of his wins came against the Milwaukee Braves, including a complete game, 5–2 victory at Milwaukee County Stadium on June 5. Slaughter gave up only one earned run on six hits and three walks, striking out eight.
