= Merritt Ranew =

American baseball player (1938–2011)

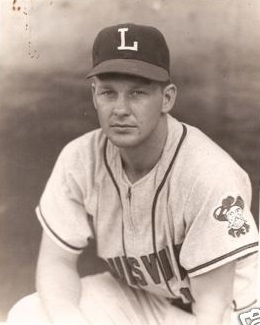
- Ranew with the Triple-A Louisville Colonels (1961)
- Catcher
- Born: May 10, 1938; Albany, Georgia, U.S.
- Died: October 18, 2011 (aged 73); Valdosta, Georgia, U.S.
- Batted: Left Threw: Right

MLB debut
- April 13, 1962, for the Houston Colt .45s

Last MLB appearance
- September 30, 1969, for the Seattle Pilots

MLB statistics
- Batting average: .247
- Home runs: 8
- Runs batted in: 54
- Stats at Baseball Reference

Teams
- Houston Colt .45s (1962); Chicago Cubs (1963–1964); Milwaukee Braves (1964); Los Angeles/California Angels (1965); Seattle Pilots (1969)

Merritt Thomas Ranew (May 10, 1938 – October 18, 2011) was an American professional baseball catcher who appeared in 269 games over all or parts of five Major League Baseball seasons (1962–65; 1969) for five different teams. He batted left-handed, threw right-handed, and was listed as 5 feet 11 inches (1.80 m) tall and 170 pounds (77 kg).

== Early professional career ==
Ranew was born in Albany, Georgia. After graduating from Lee County High School (Leesburg, Georgia), he signed with the Milwaukee Braves in 1957 and spent five years rising through the Braves' farm system, reaching the Triple-A level in 1961 with the Louisville Colonels. At Louisville, he batted .347 in limited service, his third consecutive over-300 season. On October 10, 1961, he was the 17th overall selection in the 1961 MLB Expansion Draft as the ninth pick of the fledgling Houston Colt .45s.

== Major League career ==
Ranew began 1962 on the Colt .45s' roster. He appeared in 63 games, starting 45 games at catcher, through July 15, but he hit only .227 with three home runs and was sent to Triple-A Oklahoma City for six weeks before a September recall. During spring training in 1963, Houston traded him to the Chicago Cubs, where he spent the full season as a pinch hitter and third-string catcher and batted a lofty .338 with three home runs and 15 RBI in 78 games. He was especially successful as a pinch hitter, with 17 hits in 41 at-bats (.415), including two doubles and one home run. However, he began 1964 in a deep slump and was hitting only .091 with three hits in 16 games when he was traded back to the Braves on June 3. He collected only two more hits with Milwaukee before he was sent to Triple-A Toronto. The Los Angeles Angels acquired Ranew before the 1965 campaign and recalled him from the Triple-A Seattle Angels in June; he spent the rest of the season with the MLB Angels, appearing in 24 games and collecting 19 hits.

Returning to Seattle at the outset of 1966, Ranew was batting .283 in 25 games when, on May 11, he sustained serious head injuries during a wild, on-field fight between his club and the Vancouver Mounties. After Seattle pitcher Jim Coates was accused of throwing beanballs, Vancouver's Tommie Reynolds dropped a bunt down the first-base line and charged into Coates as he tried to field it, precipitating a bench-clearing brawl. Catcher Ranew, engaging with Reynolds, was hit in the head by a bat-wielding Santiago Rosario, the on-deck hitter. Ranew was hospitalized and underwent surgery in a Seattle hospital on June 4 to relieve a blood clot; he missed the rest of the season recovering from the injury. Rosario was suspended for the balance of the 1966 campaign.

Ranew was able to rejoin the Seattle Angels in 1967 and played in 91 Pacific Coast League games. Then, after spending 1968 in the New York Yankees' organization, he returned to Seattle as a member of the 1969 Seattle Pilots, the American League expansion team. He appeared in 54 games for the Pilots, starting nine contests at catcher, three in left field, and one at third base, collected 20 hits and hit .247—coincidentally, his career big-league batting average. It was his last year in the major leagues. He retired in 1971 after 15 seasons in professional baseball.

Ranew's 147 MLB hits included 20 doubles, nine triples and eight home runs. He had 54 career runs batted in.

After leaving baseball, he became a well-known trainer of quarter horses and cutting horses in Georgia, Florida and Texas, as well as a rider. He died in Valdosta, Georgia, aged 73.
