= List of Pittsburgh Pirates team records =

The Pittsburgh Pirates are a professional baseball team based in Pittsburgh, Pennsylvania. They compete in the Central Division of Major League Baseball's (MLB) National League (NL). Founded in 1882 as Allegheny, the club played in the American Association before moving to the National League in 1887. The list below documents players and teams that hold particular club records.

In 134 seasons from 1882 through 2015, the team has won over 10,000 games and five World Series championships. The team has appeared in 18 postseasons and has won nine league pennants. Roberto Clemente owns the most career batting records with five. Ralph Kiner, Arky Vaughan and Paul Waner each own three single-season batting records. Bob Friend owns the most career pitching records and Ed Morris the most single-season pitching records, both with six.

In their history, the Pittsburgh Pirates have set three Major League Baseball records. In 1912, Chief Wilson hit an MLB-record 36 triples and, on May 30, 1925, the team collectively hit a major league-record eight triples in a single game. In addition, six no-hitters have been thrown in the history of the franchise, with the most recent on July 12, 1997. The Pirates also hold the MLB—and North American professional sports—record for most consecutive losing seasons with 20. The stretch began with the 1993 season and concluded with the 2012 season, at which point the Pirates recorded a winning record and a playoff berth in the 2013 season.

== Table key ==
Table key
#	Tie between two teams
†	National League record
*	Major League record

Statistics are current through the 2022 season.

== Individual career records ==
These are records of players with the best performance in particular statistical categories during their tenure with the Pirates.

=== Career batting ===
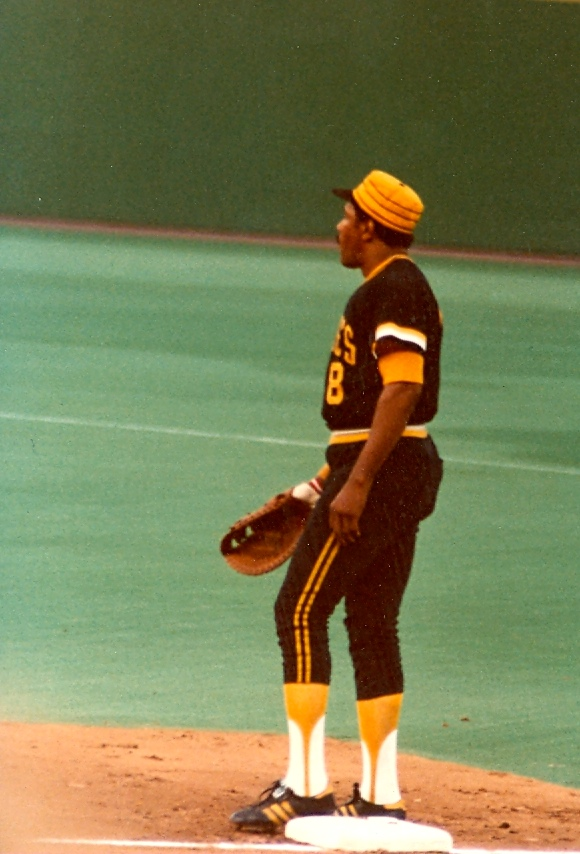
Willie Stargell is the Pirates' all-time leader in Home runs and RBIs.

Career batting records
Statistic	Player	Record	Pirates career	Ref
Batting average	Jake Stenzel	.360	1892–1896	
On-base percentage	Jake Stenzel	.429	1892–1896	
Slugging percentage	Brian Giles	.591	1999–2003	
On-base plus slugging	Brian Giles	1.018	1999–2003	
Runs	Honus Wagner	1,521	1900–1917	
Plate appearances	Honus Wagner	10,220	1900–1917	
At bats	Roberto Clemente	9,454	1955–1972	
Hits	Roberto Clemente	3,000	1955–1972	
Total bases	Roberto Clemente	4,492	1955–1972	
Singles	Roberto Clemente	2,154	1955–1972	
Doubles	Paul Waner	558	1926–1940	
Triples	Honus Wagner	232	1900–1917	
Home runs	Willie Stargell	475	1962–1982	
RBI	Willie Stargell	1,540	1962–1982	
Walks	Willie Stargell	937	1962–1982	
Strikeouts	Willie Stargell	1,936	1962–1982	
Stolen bases	Max Carey	688	1910–1926	
Games played	Roberto Clemente^{[b]}	2,433	1955–1972	

=== Career pitching ===
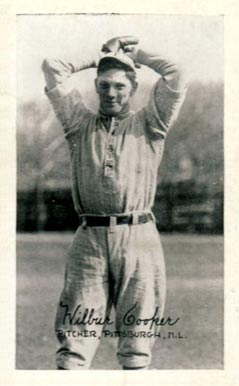
Wilbur Cooper holds the Pirates record for most wins and complete games.

Career pitching records
Statistic	Player	Record	Pirates career	Ref(s)
Wins	Wilbur Cooper	202	1912–1924	
Losses	Bob Friend	218	1951–1965	
Win–loss percentage	Ed Doheny	.731	1901–1903	
Earned run average^{[a]}	Vic Willis	2.08	1906–1910	
Saves	Roy Face	186	1953–1968	
Strikeouts	Bob Friend	1,682	1951–1965	
shutouts	Babe Adams	44	1907–1926	
Games	Roy Face	802	1953–1968	
Innings pitched	Bob Friend	3,480⅓	1951–1965	
Games started	Bob Friend	477	1951–1965	
Games finished	Roy Face	547	1953–1968	
Complete games	Wilbur Cooper	263	1912–1924	
Walks	Bob Friend	869	1951–1965	
Hits allowed	Bob Friend	3,610	1951–1965	
Wild pitches	Bob Veale	90	1962–1972	
Hit batsmen	Wilbur Cooper	93	1912–1924	

== Individual single-season records ==
These are records of Pirates players with the best performance in particular statistical categories during a single season.

=== Single-season batting ===
Chief Wilson set the MLB all-time record for triples in a single season in 1912 with 36.

Single-season batting records
Statistic	Player	Record	Season	Ref(s)
Batting average	Arky Vaughan	.385	1935	
Home runs	Ralph Kiner	54	1949	
RBI	Paul Waner	131	1927	
Runs	Jake Stenzel	150	1894	
Hits	Paul Waner	237	1927	
Singles	Lloyd Waner	198	1927	
Doubles	Paul Waner	62	1932	
Triples	Chief Wilson	36^{*}	1912	
Stolen bases	Omar Moreno	96	1980	
At bats	Matty Alou	698	1969	
Slugging percentage	Ralph Kiner	.658	1949	
Extra-base hits	Willie Stargell	90	1973	
Total bases	Kiki Cuyler	369	1925	
On-base percentage	Arky Vaughan	.491	1935	
On-base plus slugging	Arky Vaughan	1.098	1935	
Walks	Ralph Kiner	137	1951	
Strikeouts	Pedro Álvarez	186	2013	

=== Single-season pitching ===
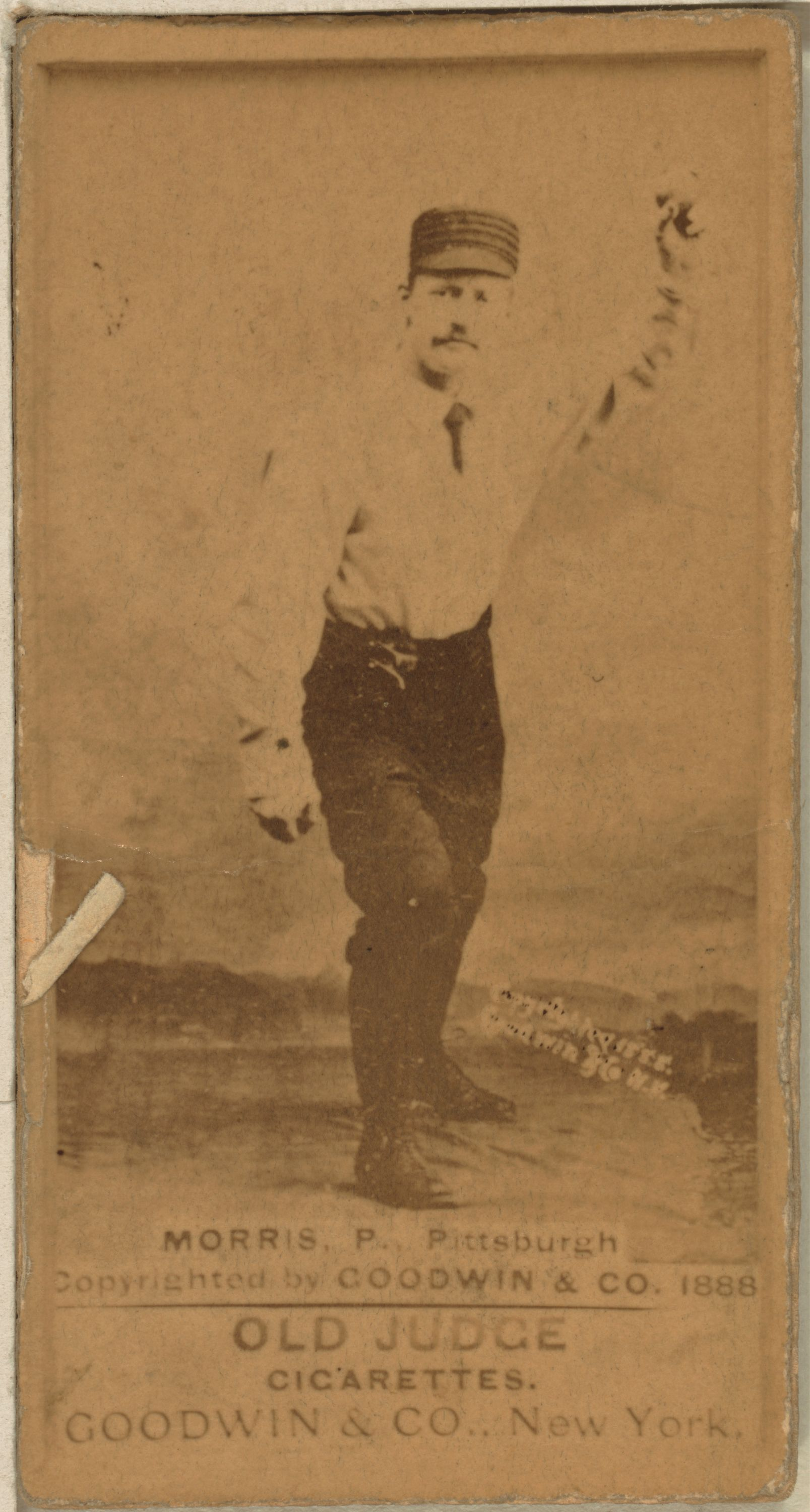
Ed Morris holds six single-season Pirates pitching records including wins, strikeouts and shutouts.

Single-season pitching records
Statistic	Player	Record	Season	Ref(s)
Wins	Ed Morris	41	1886	
Losses	Fleury Sullivan	35	1884	
Strikeouts	Ed Morris	326	1886	
ERA	Babe Adams	1.11	1909	
Earned runs allowed	Fleury Sullivan	206	1884	
Hits allowed	Fleury Sullivan	496	1884	
Shutouts	Ed Morris	12	1886	
Saves	Mark Melancon	51	2015	
Games	Kent Tekulve	94	1979	
Games started	Ed Morris	63	1885	
Complete games	Ed Morris	63	1885	
Innings pitched	Ed Morris	581	1885	

== Team single-game records ==
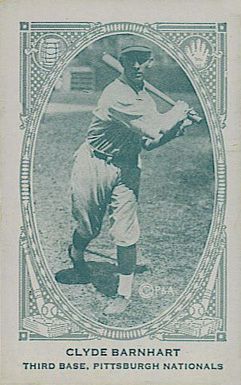
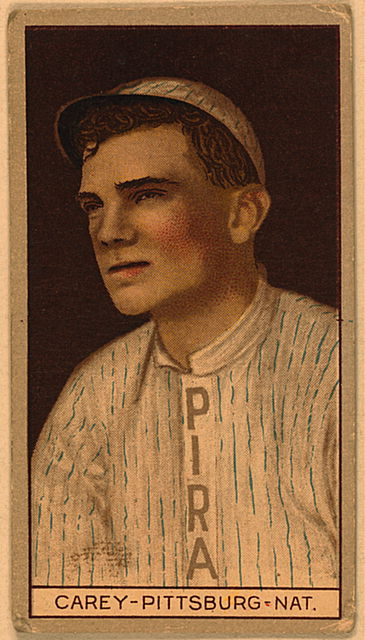
Clyde Barnhart (left) and Max Carey (right) each hit two triples during the Pirate's MLB-record eight-triple game on May 30, 1925.

These are records of Pirates teams with the best performance in particular statistical categories during a single game.

=== Single-game batting ===
Single-game batting records
Statistic	Record	Opponent	Date
Home runs hit	7^{#}	Boston Beaneaters	June 6, 1894
Home runs hit	7^{#}	St. Louis Cardinals	August 16, 1947
Home runs hit	7^{#}	St. Louis Cardinals	August 20, 2003
Runs scored	27	Boston Beaneaters	June 6, 1894
Hits	27	Philadelphia Phillies	August 8, 1922
Triples (since 1900)	8^{*}	St. Louis Cardinals	May 30, 1925
Grand slams	2^{#}	St. Louis Cardinals	June 22, 1925
Grand slams	2^{#}	Philadelphia Phillies	May 1, 1933
Grand slams	2^{#}	Chicago Cubs	September 14, 1982
Grand slams	2^{#}	St. Louis Cardinals	April 16, 1996
Strikeouts	17^{#}	Los Angeles Dodgers	June 14, 1995
Strikeouts	17^{#}	Philadelphia Phillies	July 21, 1997

=== Single-game pitching ===
Single-game pitching records
Statistic	Record	Opponent	Date
Hits allowed	28	Brooklyn Dodgers	June 23, 1930
Runs allowed	28	Boston Beaneaters	August 27, 1887
Home runs allowed	8	Milwaukee Braves	August 30, 1953
Strikeouts	16	Philadelphia Phillies	June 1, 1965

== Team season records ==
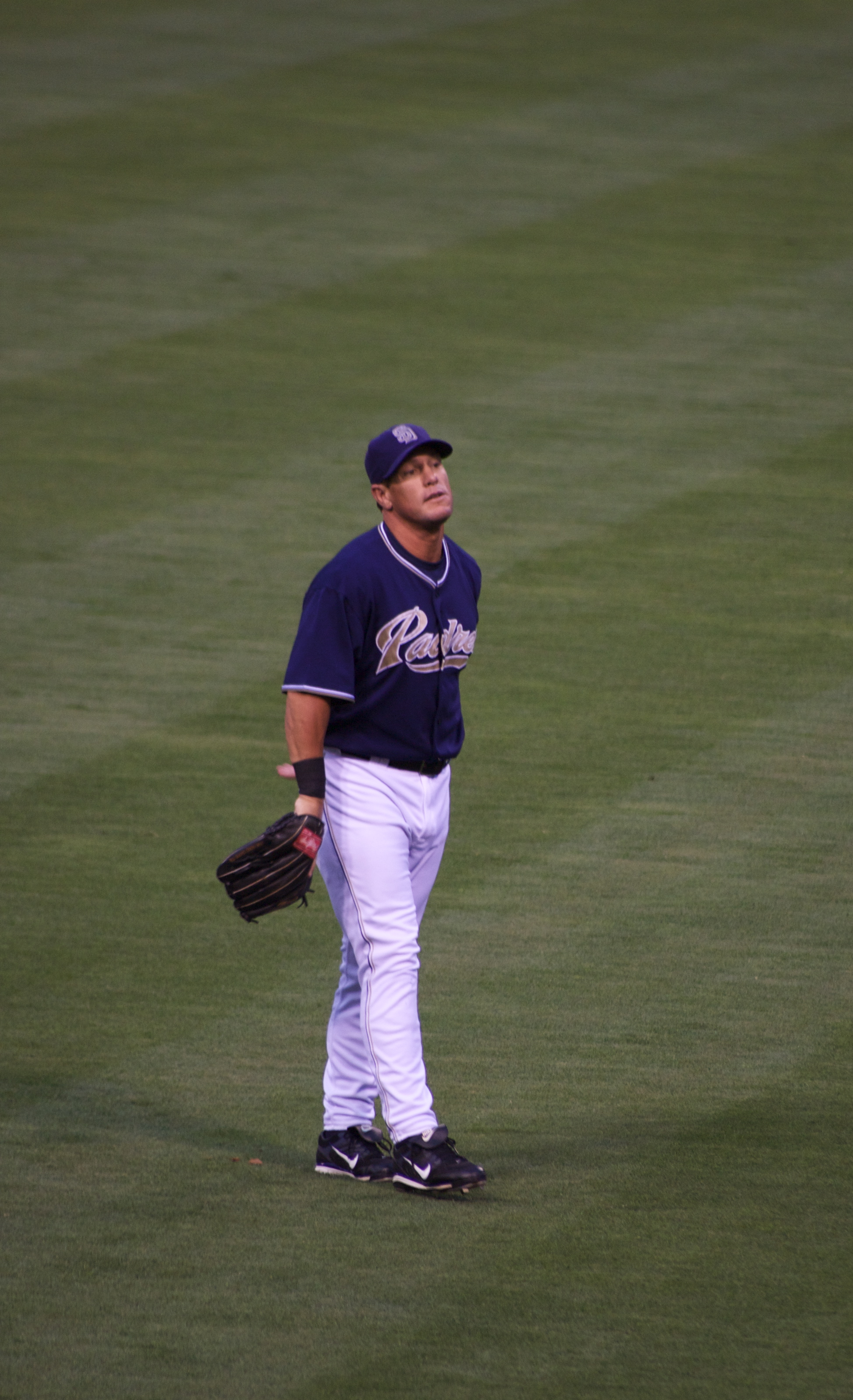
Brian Giles led the team in home runs in 1999, hitting 39 of the Pirates' franchise record 171 that season.

These are records of Pirates teams with the best and worst performances in particular statistical categories during a single season.

=== Season batting ===
Season batting records
Statistic	Record	Season
Home runs	171	1999
Runs	912	1925
Hits	1,698	1922
Doubles	320	2000
Triples	129	1912
Total bases	2,430	1966
Runners left on base	1,241	1936
Strikeouts	1,197	1999
Stolen bases	264	1907

=== Season pitching ===
Season pitching records
Statistic	Record	Season
Hits allowed	1,730	1930
Runs allowed	928	1930
Home runs allowed	183	1996
Strikeouts	1,124	1969
shutouts	26	1906

== Team all-time records ==
Team all-time records
Statistic	Record
Home runs	11,935
Runs	95,823
Hits	194,298
Batting average	.264
ERA	3.75
Runs allowed	95,814

== See also ==
- Baseball statistics
- Pittsburgh Pirates award winners and league leaders
- History of the Pittsburgh Pirates

== Notes ==
- ^{a} Earned run average is calculated as 9 × (ER ÷ IP), where $ER$ is earned runs and $IP$ is innings pitched.
- ^{[b]} Tied with Honus Wagner.
