= List of Pittsburgh Pirates award winners and league leaders =

This is a list of all awards won by players and personnel of the Pittsburgh Pirates professional baseball team.

== Awards ==
=== Most Valuable Player Award ===
- Andrew McCutchen (2013)
- Barry Bonds (1990, 1992)
- Willie Stargell (1979)
- Dave Parker (1978)
- Roberto Clemente (1966)
- Dick Groat (1960)
- Paul Waner (1927)

=== Cy Young Award ===
- Paul Skenes (2025)
- Doug Drabek (1990)
- Vern Law (1960, MLB)

=== Rookie of the Year Award ===
- Jason Bay (2004)
- Paul Skenes (2024)

=== Manager of the Year Award ===
- Clint Hurdle (2013)
- Jim Leyland (1990, 1992)

=== Gold Gloves ===
Pitcher

- Harvey Haddix (1959, 1960)
- Bobby Shantz (1961)
- Rick Reuschel (1985, 1987)

Catcher

- Tony Peña (1983, 1984, 1985)
- Mike LaValliere (1987)
- Jacob Stallings (2021)

First base

Second base

- Bill Mazeroski (1958, 1960, 1961, 1963, 1964, 1965, 1966, 1967)
- José Lind (1992)

Third base

- Ke’Bryan Hayes (2023, 2025)

Shortstop

- Gene Alley (1966, 1967)
- Jay Bell (1993)

Outfield

- Roberto Clemente (1961, 1962, 1963, 1964, 1965, 1966, 1967, 1968, 1969, 1970, 1971, 1972)
- Bill Virdon (1962)
- Dave Parker (1977, 1978, 1979)
- Andy Van Slyke (1988, 1989, 1990, 1991, 1992)
- Barry Bonds (1990, 1991, 1992)
- Nate McLouth (2008)
- Andrew McCutchen (2012)
- Starling Marte (2015, 2016)
- Corey Dickerson (2018)

Utility

- Jared Triolo (2024)

=== Wilson Defensive Player of the Year Award ===
See explanatory note at Atlanta Braves award winners and league leaders.
Team (at all positions)

- (2012)
- (2013)

Catcher (in MLB)

- Russell Martin (2014)

Left fielder (in MLB)

- Starling Marte (2015)

=== Silver Slugger Award ===
Pitcher

- Don Robinson (1982)
- Rick Rhoden (1984, 1985, 1986)

Catcher

First base

Second base

- Johnny Ray (1983)
- Neil Walker (2014)
- Brandon Lowe (2026)

Third base

- Pedro Álvarez (2013)

Shortstop

- Jay Bell (1993)
- Jack Wilson (2004)

Outfield

- Bobby Bonilla (1988, 1990, 1991)
- Andy Van Slyke (1988, 1992)
- Barry Bonds (1990, 1991, 1992)
- Andrew McCutchen (2012, 2013, 2014, 2015)

=== All-MLB Team ===
==== First team ====
Starting pitcher

- Paul Skenes (2024, 2025)

Second baseman

- Brandon Lowe (2026)

=== Trevor Hoffman NL Reliever of the Year Award ===
- Mark Melancon (2015)

=== Comeback Player of the Year Award ===
- Francisco Liriano (2013)
- Vern Law (1964)
- Willie Stargell (1978)
- Rick Reuschel (1985)

=== All-Star Game MVP Award ===
- Dave Parker (1979)

=== Roberto Clemente Award ===
- Willie Stargell (1974)
- Andrew McCutchen (2015)

=== DHL Hometown Heroes (2006) ===
- Roberto Clemente — voted by MLB fans as the most outstanding player in the history of the franchise, based on on-field performance, leadership quality and character value

=== Players Choice Awards Outstanding Player (NL) ===
- Andrew McCutchen (2012, 2013)

=== Players Choice Awards Outstanding Rookie (NL) ===
- Jason Bay (2004)

=== Players Choice Awards Comeback Player (NL) ===
- Barry Bonds (1992)
- Francisco Liriano (2013)

=== Ford C. Frick Award ===
- Bob Prince (1986)
- Milo Hamilton (1992)

=== Dapper Dan Sportsman of the Year ===
- Rip Sewell (1943)
- Frankie Frisch (1944)
- Bill Meyer (1948)
- Ralph Kiner (1947, 1949)
- Murry Dickson (1951)
- Dale Long (1956)
- Dick Groat (1957, 1960)
- Danny Murtaugh (1958, 1970, 1971)
- Roy Face (1959)
- Roberto Clemente (1961, 1966, 1971)
- Vernon Law (1965)
- Steve Blass (1968)
- Willie Stargell (1971, 1979)
- Dave Parker (1978)
- Syd Thrift (1987)
- Jim Leyland (1990)
- Jay Bell (1993)
- Jason Kendall (2000)
- Andrew McCutchen (2012)
- Clint Hurdle (2013)

== Team award ==
- 1971 – Warren C. Giles Trophy (National League champion)
- 1971 – World Series Trophy
- 1979 – Warren C. Giles Trophy (National League champion)
- 1979 – World Series Trophy
- 2015 – Baseball America Organization of the Year

== Minor league system ==
=== Minor League Player and Pitcher of the Year ===
Minor League Player and Pitcher of the Year
Year	Player of the Year	Pitcher of the Year	Ref.
1999	Chad Hermansen	—	
2000	J. R. House	Wilson Guzman	
2001	Humberto Cota	Sean Burnett	
2002	Walter Young	Sean Burnett	
2003	Chris Shelton	Ian Snell	
2004	Brad Eldred	Zach Duke	
2005	José Bautista	Paul Maholm	
2006	Andrew McCutchen	Tom Gorzelanny	
2007	Steve Pearce	John Van Benschoten	
2008	Jim Negrych	Jeff Sues	
2009	Pedro Álvarez	Rudy Owens	
2010	Alex Presley	Rudy Owens	
2011	Robbie Grossman	Kyle McPherson	
2012	Gregory Polanco	Jeff Locke	
2013	Andrew Lambo	Tyler Glasnow	
2014	Josh Bell	Tyler Glasnow	
2015	Max Moroff	Yeudy Garcia	
2016	Josh Bell	Mitch Keller	
2017	Jordan Luplow	Steven Brault	
2018	Ke'Bryan Hayes	J. T. Brubaker	
2019	Mason Martin	James Marvel	

== Franchise records ==
See: Pittsburgh Pirates#Franchise records

== Other achievements ==
=== Hall of Famers ===
See: Pittsburgh Pirates#Baseball Hall of Fame

=== Retired numbers ===
See: Pittsburgh Pirates#Retired numbers

=== Associated Press Athlete of the Year ===
- Willie Stargell (1979)

=== Sporting News Sportsman of the Year ===
See: Sporting News#Sportsman of the Year

=== Sports Illustrated Sportsperson of the Year ===
- Willie Stargell (1979; with Terry Bradshaw)

=== No-Hitters ===
Pirates No-Hitters
Name	IP	Date
Nick Maddox	9.0	20 Sep 1907
Cliff Chambers	9.0	6 May 1951
Bob Moose	9.0	20 Sep 1969
Dock Ellis	9.0	12 Jun 1970
John Candelaria	9.0	9 Aug 1976
Francisco Córdova; Ricardo Rincón	9.0; 1.0	12 Jul 1997

- On September 20, 1907, Nick Maddox, a 20-year-old rookie, threw the first no-hitter for the Pittsburgh Pirates baseball club. Through 1907 and 1908 Maddox won 20 of his 30 starts, making him the fastest pitcher to ever reach 20 games. This mark will be tied in the future by three other pitchers, but never beaten. Maddox won the third game of the 1909 World Series over Detroit, but was released in 1910 after winning only two games.
- The Pirates waited decades later for their next no-hitter, which was delivered by Cliff Chambers against the Boston Braves in Boston, a 3–0 victory, on May 6, 1951. Chambers walked eight and had one wild pitch, and he also drove in the third run in the 8th inning. For Chambers, this was his last victory in a Pirates uniform.
- Bob Moose no-hit the New York Mets in New York on September 20, 1969, which became the 5th no-hitter recorded by National League pitchers, a record at the time. Moose later moved into a relief role, and in 1976 led the Pirates in saves.
- Dock Ellis might be considered the most notorious no-hitter pitcher. In his autobiography, Dock Ellis in the Country of Baseball, Ellis revealed that he pitched his no-hitter against the San Diego Padres while under the influence of LSD. Ellis won the game 2–0, receiving his support from two Willie Stargell home runs.
- John "The Candy Man" Candelaria threw his no-hitter against the Los Angeles Dodgers on August 9, 1976, winning 2–0. Candelaria got out of a bases-loaded jam in the 3rd inning to preserve his no-hit shut out. It was the first no-hitter thrown in Pittsburgh by a Pirate since Nick Maddox in 1907.
- July 12, 1997 was Pittsburgh's first non-Opening Day sellout since 1977; the crowd of 44,119 saw Francisco Córdova and Ricardo Rincón pitch 10 innings of no-hit, shut out baseball against the Houston Astros. The Pirates were held scoreless through nine innings, meaning the game would need extra innings. Rincon came in to relieve Córdova, who had thrown 121 pitches, in the 10th inning, and Rincón completed the performance by pitching a single inning of no-hit baseball. Rincon got the win when Mark Smith hit a three-run, pinch hit home run in the bottom of the 10th. Three seasons later, in 2000, Córdova was on his way to recording his 2nd no-hitter with the Pirates until he gave up a hit with one out in the 8th inning.

== League leaders ==
=== Hitting ===
==== Batting champions ====
- Ed Swartwood (1883)
- Honus Wagner (1900, 1903, 1904, 1906, 1907, 1908, 1909, 1911)
- Ginger Beaumont (1902)
- Paul Waner (1927, 1934, 1936)
- Arky Vaughan (1935)
- Debs Garms (1940)
- Dick Groat (1960)
- Roberto Clemente (1961, 1964, 1965, 1967)
- Matty Alou (1966)
- Dave Parker (1977, 1978)
- Bill Madlock (1981, 1983)
- Freddy Sanchez (2006)

==== Doubles ====
- Mike Mansell (1882)
- Ed Swartwood (1882)
- Honus Wagner (1900, 1902, 1904, 1906, 1907, 1908, 1909)
- Fred Clarke (1903)
- Bobby Byrne (1910)
- Paul Waner (1928, 1932)
- Matty Alou (1969)
- Willie Stargell (1973)
- Dave Parker (1977)
- Johnny Ray (1983, 1984)
- Bobby Bonilla (1991)
- Andy Van Slyke (1992)
- Freddy Sanchez (2006)
- Nate McLouth (2008)

==== Triples ====
- Mike Mansell (1882)
- Harry Davis (1897)
- Jimmy Williams (1899)
- Honus Wagner (1900, 1903, 1908)
- Tommy Leach (1902)
- Fred Clarke (1906)
- Chief Wilson (1912)
- Max Carey (1914, 1923)
- Bill Hinchman (1916)
- Billy Southworth (1919)
- Pie Traynor (1923)
- Kiki Cuyler (1925)
- Paul Waner (1926, 1927)
- Lloyd Waner (1929)
- Adam Comorosky (1930)
- Arky Vaughan (1933, 1937, 1940)
- Johnny Barrett (1944)
- Gus Bell (1951)
- Dale Long (1955)
- Bill Virdon (1962)
- Roberto Clemente (1969)
- Omar Moreno (1980)
- Andy Van Slyke (1988)
- Jack Wilson (2004)
- Bryan Reynolds (2021)

==== Home runs ====
- Tommy Leach (1902)
- Ralph Kiner (1946, 1947, 1948, 1949, 1950, 1951, 1952)
- Willie Stargell (1971, 1973)
- Pedro Álvarez (2013)

==== Runs batted in ====
- Honus Wagner (1901, 1902, 1908, 1909, 1912)
- Joe Nealon (1906)
- Chief Wilson (1911)
- Paul Waner (1927)
- Ralph Kiner (1949)
- Willie Stargell (1973)

=== Pitching ===
==== Wins ====
- Ed Morris (1886)
- Frank Killen (1893, 1896)
- Jack Chesbro (1902)
- Wilbur Cooper (1921)
- Ray Kremer (1926, 1930)
- Lee Meadows (1926)
- Burleigh Grimes (1928)
- Heine Meine (1931)
- Rip Sewell (1943)
- Bob Friend (1958)
- Doug Drabek (1990)
- John Smiley (1991)

==== Saves ====
- Bob Barr (1883)
- Ed Morris (1886)
- Bill Sowders (1889)
- Mark Baldwin (1893)
- Tom Colcolough (1893)
- Sam Leever (1899)
- Wilbur Cooper (1918)
- Johnny Morrison (1925)
- Mace Brown (1937, 1940)
- Roy Face (1958, 1961, 1962)
- Dave Giusti (1971)
- Mark Melancon (2015)
- David Bednar (2023)

==== Earned run average ====
- Rube Waddell (1900)
- Jesse Tannehill (1901)
- Sam Leever (1903)
- Ray Kremer (1926, 1927)
- Cy Blanton (1935)
- Bob Friend (1955)
- John Candelaria (1977)
- Paul Skenes (2025)

==== Strikeouts ====
- Bob Barr (1885)
- Preacher Roe (1945)
- Bob Veale (1964)

== See also ==
- Chuck Tanner Baseball Manager of the Year Award
- Baseball awards
- List of MLB awards
