= Paul Skenes =

American baseball player (born 2002)

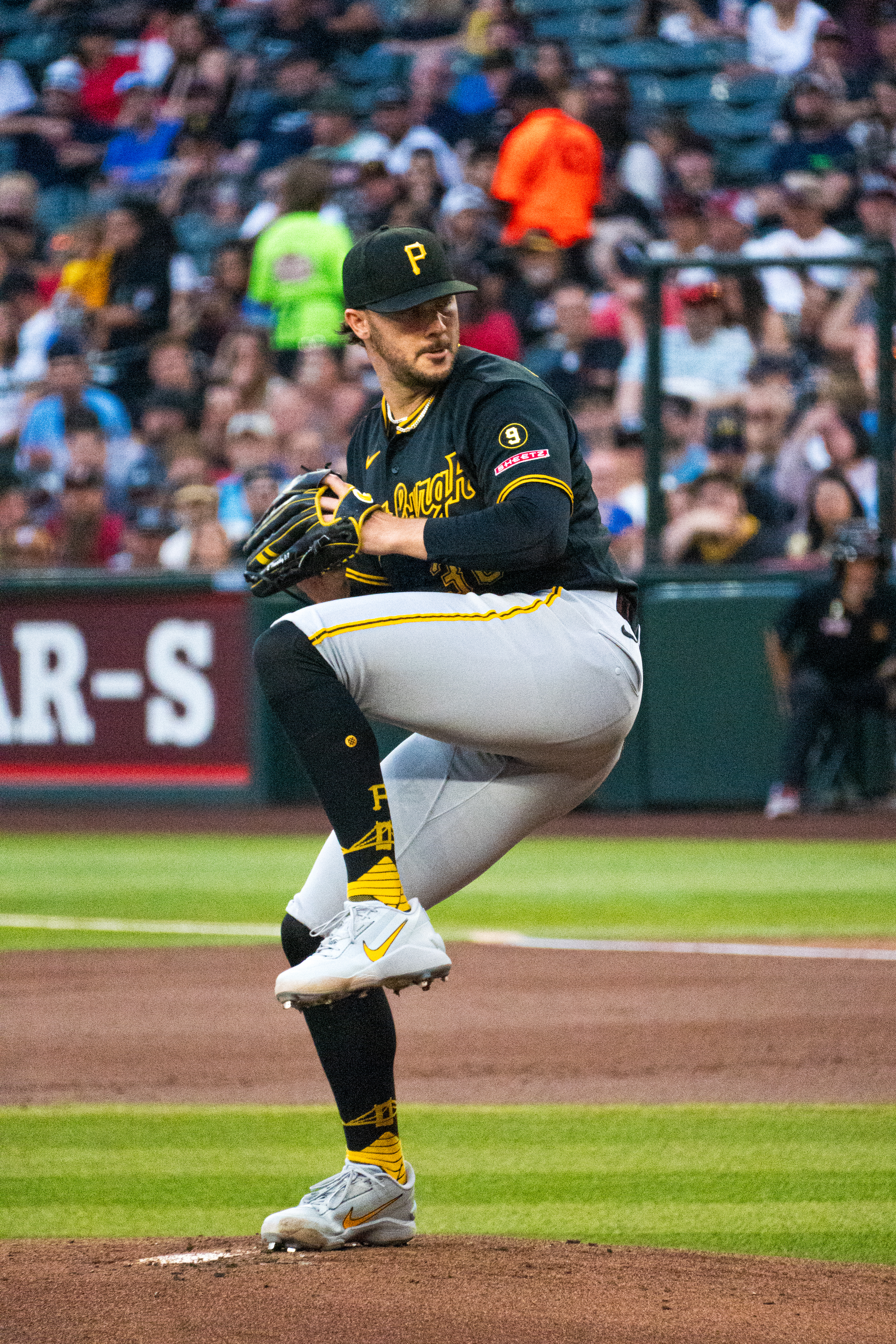
- Skenes with the Pittsburgh Pirates in 2026

Pittsburgh Pirates – No. 30
- Pitcher
- Born: May 29, 2002 (age 24); Fullerton, California, U.S.
- Bats: Right Throws: Right

MLB debut
- May 11, 2024, for the Pittsburgh Pirates

MLB statistics (through September 24, 2026)
- Win–loss record: 31–24
- Earned run average: 2.62
- Strikeouts: 586
- Stats at Baseball Reference

Teams
- Pittsburgh Pirates (2024–present)

Career highlights and awards
- 3× All-Star (2024–2026); NL Cy Young Award (2025); 2× All-MLB First Team (2024, 2025); NL Rookie of the Year (2024); MLB ERA leader (2025); Dick Howser Trophy (2023); National Pitcher of the Year Award (2023); 2× College Baseball All-America Team (2022, 2023)
Medals
Men's baseball
Representing United States
World Baseball Classic
Silver medal – second place	2026 Miami	Team

Paul David Skenes (/skiːnz/, born May 29, 2002) is an American professional baseball pitcher for the Pittsburgh Pirates of Major League Baseball (MLB). He made his MLB debut in 2024. Skenes played college baseball for the Air Force Falcons and Louisiana State University (LSU) Tigers.

Skenes was born and raised in Orange County, California, where he attended El Toro High School and played three seasons of varsity baseball. Skenes initially attended the United States Air Force Academy and won the John Olerud Award, given annually to the best two-way player in college baseball, in 2022. Ahead of his junior season, Skenes transferred to LSU, where he won Southeastern Conference and national pitcher of the year honors as well as the Dick Howser Trophy. Skenes was part of the LSU pitching staff during the team's 2023 Men's College World Series championship win and was named the tournament's Most Outstanding Player.

Skenes entered the 2023 MLB draft as one of its most anticipated prospects and considered by some as the best pitching prospect since Stephen Strasburg. Skenes was selected first overall by the Pirates and signed to a $9.2 million bonus. After working through the Pirates’ farm system in just one season, he made his MLB debut in May 2024 and was named the starting pitcher for the National League in the 2024 All-Star Game, becoming only the fifth rookie in MLB history to do so. Skenes was named to his second and third All-Star Game in 2025 and 2026. He won the NL Rookie of the Year award in 2024 and the NL Cy Young Award in 2025, becoming the first player to win those awards in consecutive seasons since Dwight Gooden did it in the 1984 and 1985 seasons.

== Early life ==
Paul David Skenes was born on May 29, 2002, in Fullerton, California, to Craig, a pharmaceuticals company employee, and Karen, a homemaker and former high school teacher. Two of Skenes' uncles served in the United States Navy while another served in the Coast Guard. Skenes grew up a fan of the Los Angeles Angels.

Skenes grew up in Lake Forest, California, and attended El Toro High School, the alma mater of major leaguers Nolan Arenado and Matt Chapman, among others. Skenes played three years of varsity baseball as a two-way player—he played catcher, first base, and third base in addition to pitching. In September 2018, during his junior year, Skenes announced his commitment to attend the United States Air Force Academy and play college baseball for the Air Force Falcons. In his junior season, he posted a 0.67 earned run average (ERA). He was voted to the all-star teams for the Coast View Athletic Association, Orange County, the CIF Southern Section, and the state of California. During his senior year, Skenes was named team captain and had a 0.33 ERA, and hit three home runs before the remainder of the season was abruptly canceled in response to the COVID-19 pandemic. He was named to the all-county first team following the season. Skenes graduated from El Toro in 2020 with a grade point average of 4.76.

== College career ==
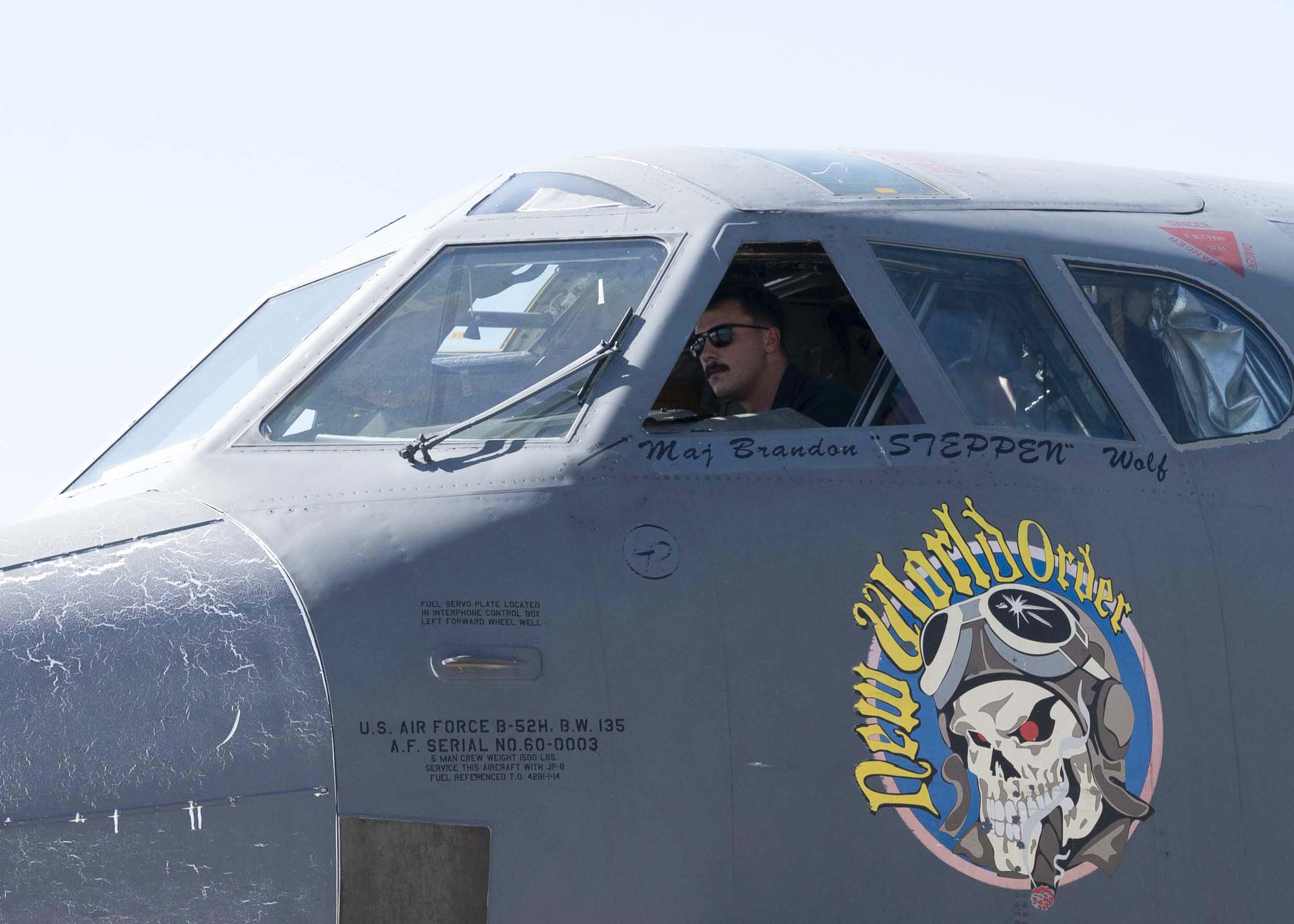
Skenes in 2023 in the cockpit of a Boeing B-52 Stratofortress, while touring Barksdale Air Force Base, Louisiana

Skenes honored his commitment to play college baseball for the Air Force Falcons and accepted an appointment as part of the class of 2024. In his first season at Air Force, Skenes was named the Mountain West Conference Freshman of the Year and a first-team All-American by the Collegiate Baseball Newspaper, Baseball America, and the National Collegiate Baseball Writers Association. In 2021, he played collegiate summer baseball with the Wareham Gatemen of the Cape Cod Baseball League. In 2022, Skenes won the John Olerud Award as the nation's best two-way player.

After his sophomore season, Skenes entered the NCAA transfer portal. On July 28, 2022, Skenes announced that he would transfer to Louisiana State University to play for the LSU Tigers. On June 22, 2023, Skenes broke Ben McDonald's SEC and LSU record for strikeouts in a single season, recording his 203rd strikeout of the year.

Following the 2023 season, Skenes won the National Pitcher of the Year Award and the Dick Howser Trophy. LSU won the 2023 College World Series and Skenes was named the College World Series Most Outstanding Player.

== Professional career ==
=== Draft and minor leagues ===
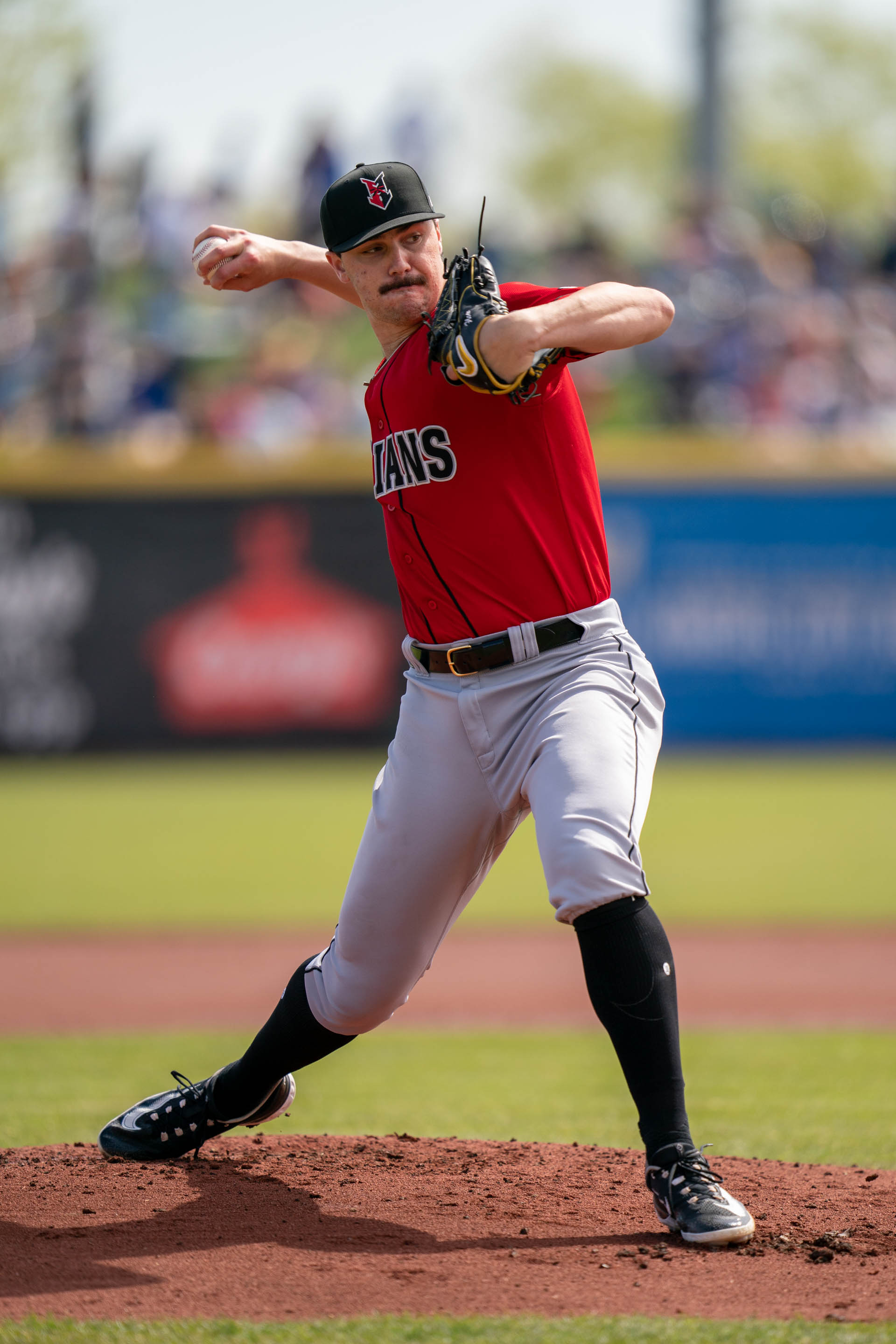
Skenes pitching for the Indianapolis Indians in April 2024

The Pittsburgh Pirates selected Skenes with the first overall selection of the 2023 Major League Baseball draft. He and Dylan Crews became the first college teammates in MLB draft history to be selected with the first two overall picks. Skenes was the second player in LSU history to be selected first overall in the draft, joining Ben McDonald. He signed with the Pirates on July 18, 2023, for a $9.2 million signing bonus, the highest ever for a drafted player at the time. Skenes debuted on MLB.com's MLB Pipeline list as the third-ranked prospect league-wide and the top-ranked pitcher.

On August 7, Skenes was assigned to the rookie-level Florida Complex League Pirates with the expectation of limited innings due to his high usage at LSU the prior spring. He made his professional debut on August 10 and pitched a one-two-three inning against the FCL Twins; all but one of his pitches were clocked at 99 miles per hour (159 km/h) or higher and he struck out fellow top draft pick Walker Jenkins. Five days later, August 15, Skenes was assigned to the Single-A Bradenton Marauders. Just six days after that he was again promoted, to the Double-A Altoona Curve. Skenes began the 2024 season with the Triple-A Indianapolis Indians. He pitched to a 0.99 ERA with 45 strikeouts over 27 1/3 innings.

=== Pittsburgh Pirates ===
==== 2024 ====
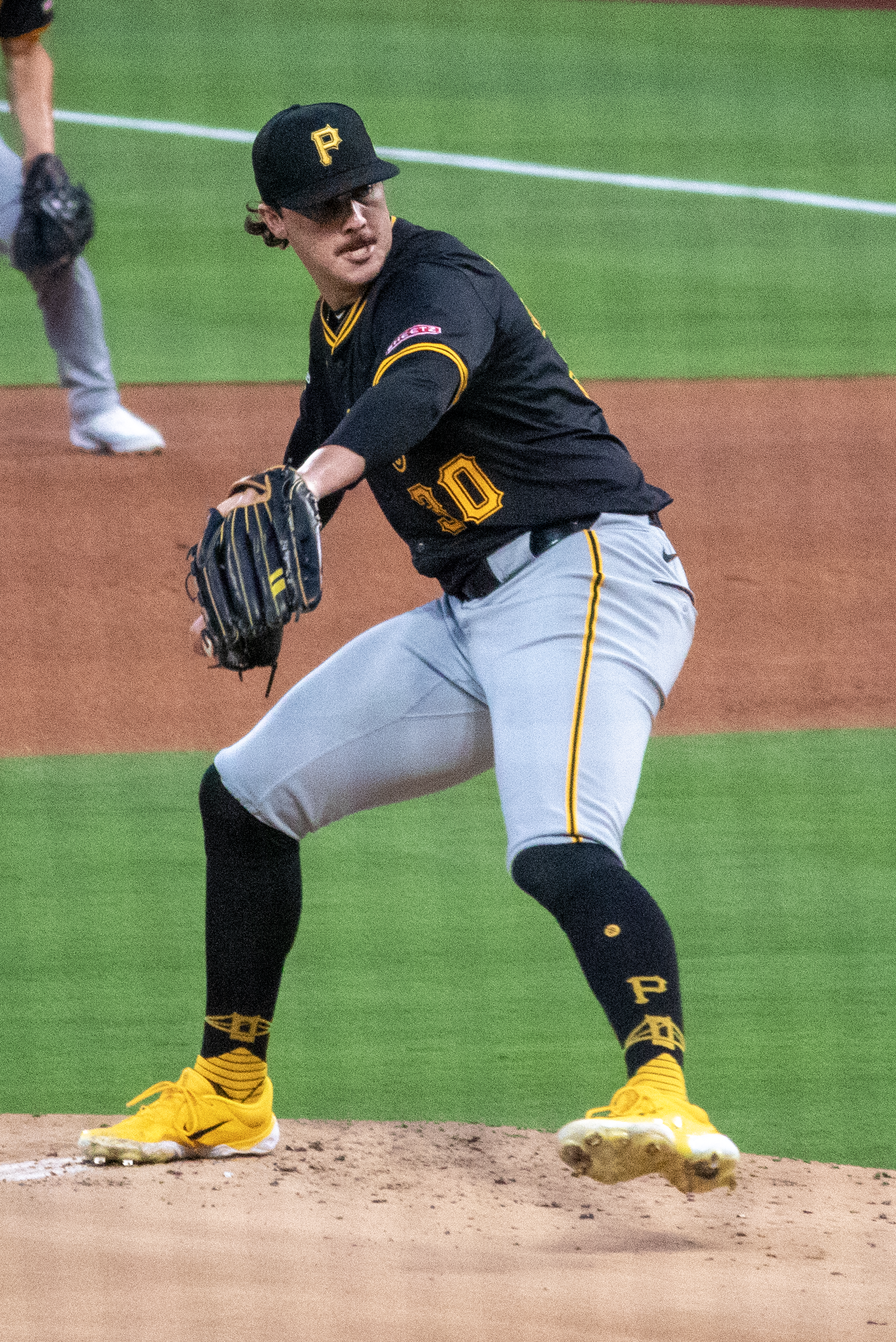
Skenes pitching for the Pirates

On May 11, 2024, the Pirates selected Skenes' contract and promoted him to the major leagues for the first time. In his MLB debut at PNC Park against the Chicago Cubs that day, Skenes threw 17 fastballs at 100 miles per hour (160 km/h) or higher and struck out seven, but surrendered three earned runs in four innings in a no decision. In his second start, against the Cubs at Wrigley Field on May 17, Skenes threw six innings without allowing a hit, striking out eleven batters (including the first seven batters he faced).

On July 7, 2024, he was selected to the 2024 Major League Baseball All-Star Game, becoming the first No. 1 draft pick to do so as a rookie. On July 11, National League team manager Torey Lovullo named Skenes the starting pitcher for the National League for the game, becoming the fifth rookie ever to receive the selection. Skenes threw a scoreless inning in the All-Star game, walking Juan Soto but subsequently retiring Aaron Judge with a groundout. On September 9 against the Miami Marlins, Skenes struck out Connor Norby in the top of the first inning to record his 143rd strikeout, the new Pittsburgh Pirates franchise record for strikeouts in a single season by a rookie. Skenes ended his rookie season with a 1.96 ERA, 0.95 WHIP, 170 strikeouts, 32 walks, and an 11–3 record in 23 starts. After the season, Skenes was named NL Rookie of the Year and finished third for the Cy Young Award losing to Chris Sale of the Atlanta Braves.

==== 2025 ====
On January 28, 2025, Skenes was named as one of the three cover athletes of MLB The Show 25 alongside Elly De La Cruz and Gunnar Henderson, making him the first pitcher, excluding two-way player Shohei Ohtani, to be featured on an MLB The Show cover.

On March 27, 2025, Skenes was the Opening Day starting pitcher for the 2025 Pirates. Facing the Miami Marlins at LoanDepot Park, he pitched five1/3 innings, giving up two hits and walking two while striking out seven. However, the Marlins scored three runs in the last two innings off of Pittsburgh's bullpen, defeating the Pirates, 5–4, and leaving Skenes with a no decision. On April 2, 2025, he got his first win of the season against Tampa Bay Rays, pitched seven innings, giving up three hits, and striking out six batters in a 4–2 win. On April 26, 2025, Skenes hurled 6 1/3 scoreless innings and recorded a season-high with nine strikeouts in the Pirates’ 3–0 win against the Los Angeles Dodgers.

On July 6, Skenes was named to the 2025 All-Star Game roster, his second consecutive NL All-Star selection. On July 12, National League team manager Dave Roberts named Skenes the starting pitcher for the National League for the game, his second consecutive year to receive the selection. Skenes threw a scoreless inning in the All-Star game, striking out Gleyber Torres and Riley Greene and retiring Aaron Judge with a groundout. Skenes was named as National League Pitcher of the Month for July after posting a 3–2 record, 0.67 ERA, allowing 21 hits and two earned runs, striking out 36 batters, and walked three in 27 innings. It was the first time he earned Pitcher of the Month in his career. Skenes' 50th start was on August 24 against the Colorado Rockies, and he lowered his career ERA to 2.02. Since the start of the Live Ball Era in 1920, the only pitcher to have a lower ERA over their first 50 starts is Vida Blue, who recorded a 2.01 ERA from 1969 to 1972. On September 10, Skenes pitched five innings, giving up two hits, and striking out eight batters against Baltimore Orioles at Oriole Park at Camden Yards. With those eight Ks, Skenes recorded his first 200-strikeout season. He became the 8th Pirates pitcher in franchise history to strike out 200 batters in a season, joining Ed Morris, Bob Veale, Óliver Pérez, Mitch Keller, A. J. Burnett, Francisco Liriano, and Gerrit Cole. Skenes finished the season with a 1.97 ERA, the first sub-2.00 ERA for a starting pitcher since Justin Verlander's 1.75 ERA with the Houston Astros in 2022. He became the fourth player in the live ball era (since 1920) to record an ERA that low in his age-23 season or younger, joining Dwight Gooden (1985 at age 20), Vida Blue (1971, age 21), and Dean Chance (1964, age 23). He also set a new franchise record for most strikeouts for a right-handed pitcher, now sitting at 216 after breaking Mitch Keller's record of 210.

==== 2026 ====
Named the opening day starter for 2026, Skenes allowed five runs in the first inning against the New York Mets on March 26, and was relieved of duties by the bullpen after recording only two outs. However, he quickly rebounded over the next 5 starts, winning 4 decisions and lowering his ERA back to a solid 2.48, with 30 strikeouts over 29 inning of work. He was particularly dominant against the rival Milwaukee Brewers, where he carried a perfect game into the 7th inning, before allowing a 2-out single to Jake Bauers. He eventually got the next out, pitching seven scoreless innings with 7 punchouts, to earn the win.

In July, he made the All-Star Game for a third consecutive year. Across 32 starts, Skenes finished the year with a 3.82 ERA and 200 strikeouts, becoming the first Pirates pitcher to record back-to-back 200-strikeout seasons since Bob Veale.

== Personal life ==
Skenes is in a relationship with former LSU gymnast and social media influencer Livvy Dunne. He said in an interview that they started dating after his best friend at LSU dated Dunne's roommate Elena Arenas.

He played for the United States national baseball team in the 2026 World Baseball Classic. In the semifinal against the Dominican Republic, Skenes allowed one earned run with no walks and two strikeouts over 4 1/3 innings as the United States won 2–1 to advance to the championship game.

== See also ==
- List of first overall Major League Baseball draft picks
- List of Major League Baseball annual ERA leaders
- List of Pittsburgh Pirates award winners and league leaders

Awards
Preceded by Zack Wheeler	National League Pitcher of the Month; July 2025	Succeeded by Freddy Peralta
