= Wilbur Cooper =

American baseball player (1892–1973)

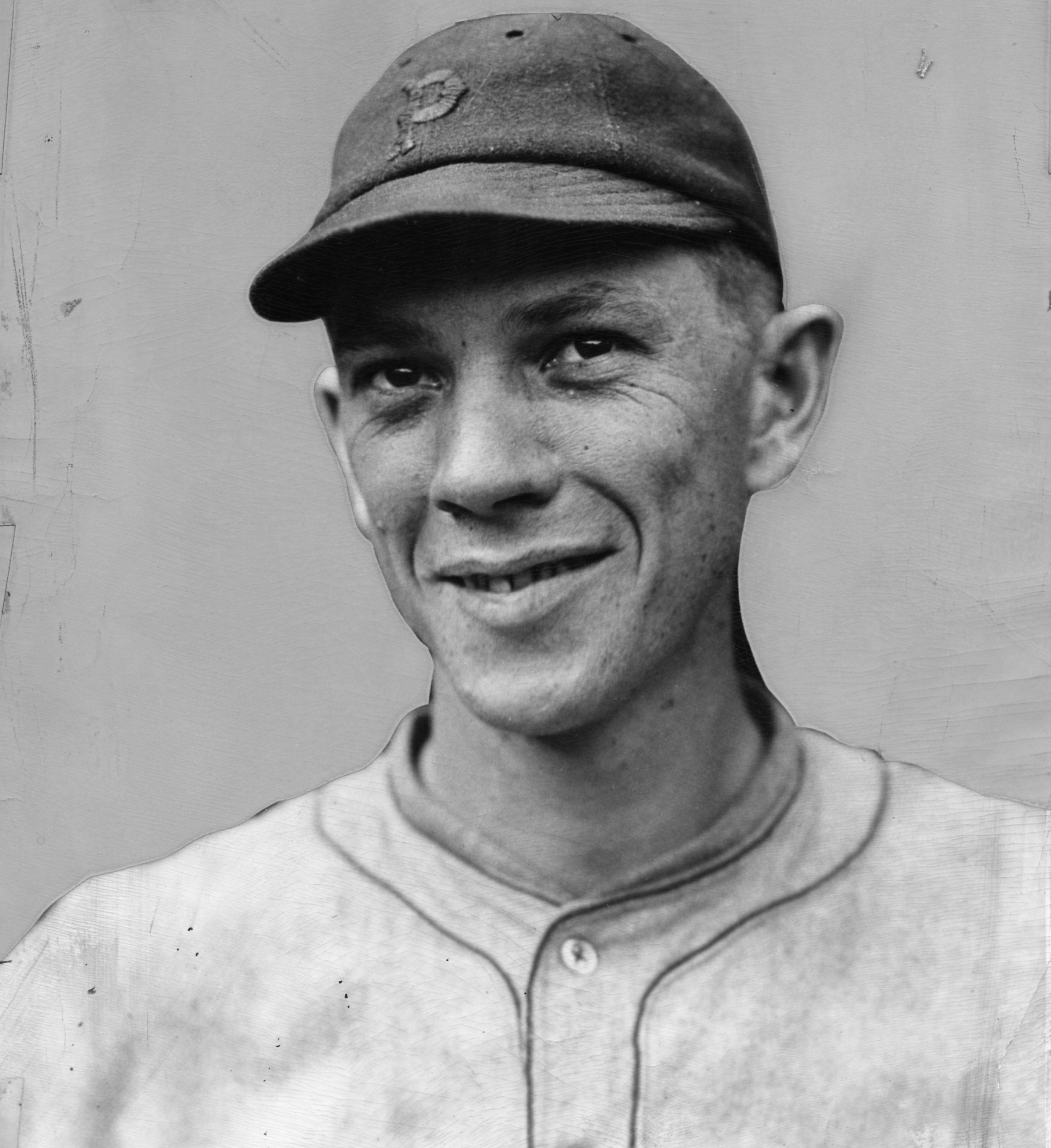
- Cooper c. 1915–1919
- Pitcher
- Born: February 24, 1892; Bearsville, West Virginia, U.S.
- Died: August 7, 1973 (aged 81); Encino, California, U.S.
- Batted: Right Threw: Left

MLB debut
- August 29, 1912, for the Pittsburgh Pirates

Last MLB appearance
- July 21, 1926, for the Detroit Tigers

MLB statistics
- Win–loss record: 216–178
- Earned run average: 2.89
- Strikeouts: 1,252
- Stats at Baseball Reference

Teams
- Pittsburgh Pirates (1912–1924); Chicago Cubs (1925–1926); Detroit Tigers (1926)

Career highlights and awards
- NL wins leader (1921)

Arley Wilbur Cooper (February 24, 1892 – August 7, 1973) was an American starting pitcher in Major League Baseball who played most of his career for the Pittsburgh Pirates. A four-time winner of 20 games in the early 1920s, he was the first National League left-hander to win 200 games. He established NL records for left-handers – second only to Eddie Plank among all southpaws – for career wins (216), innings pitched (3466 1/3) and games started (405); all were broken within several years by Eppa Rixey. His career earned run average of 2.89 is also the lowest of any left-hander with at least 3000 innings in the NL. He still holds the Pirates franchise records for career victories (202) and complete games (263); he also set club records, since broken, for innings (3201), strikeouts (1191), and games pitched (469).

== Career ==
Cooper was born in Bearsville, West Virginia, and his family moved to Waterford, Ohio when he was a boy. He began his professional career in 1911 with the Marion, Ohio based Marion Diggers minor league team partially owned by future U.S. President Warren G. Harding; some reports suggested that Harding was the person who recommended Cooper to the Pirates, although he pitched for another minor league team before reaching the majors. In his first start with Pittsburgh in 1912, he pitched a shutout against the St. Louis Cardinals. In 1916 he set a team record, still unbroken, with a 1.87 earned run average. He won at least 17 games each year from 1917 through 1924, peaking with seasons of 24, 22 and 23 wins from 1920 to 1922, and led the league in starts and complete games twice each, and in wins, innings and shutouts once each. He worked quickly in his starts, often not getting the signal from his catcher until he had already begun his windup. Also known as an excellent fielder, in 1920 he became the only pitcher in major league history to begin two triple plays in a single season (on July 7 and August 21), and in 1924 he picked off a record seven runners at third base; that year the Pirates finished within three games of first place, the closest he would come to a championship.

In October 1924, Cooper was traded to the Chicago Cubs, along with Charlie Grimm and Rabbit Maranville, in a decidedly unpopular six-player deal; he was greatly disappointed to leave the Pirates, and never pitched as effectively again. In 1925, while Pittsburgh won the NL pennant for the first time since 1909, he surpassed Rube Marquard for the NL career innings record for left-handers; the following year, he broke Marquard's league record for career starts. In June 1926 he was picked up by the Detroit Tigers, and he ended his major league career after eight games with the team, though he played in the minor leagues through 1930. Over his career, he was 216–178 with a 2.89 ERA in 517 games, and struck out 1252 batters in 3480 innings. In addition to his NL career records for left-handers in wins, starts and innings, he also ranked second among league southpaws to Marquard in strikeouts (1250) and games pitched (509), second to Ted Breitenstein in complete games (279), and second to Nap Rucker in shutouts (35). His Pirates team records for innings and strikeouts were later surpassed by Bob Friend, and his record for games pitched was broken by teammate Babe Adams in 1926. Cooper, who batted right-handed, was also a fine hitter, and teammate Pie Traynor recalled that he would often bat in the #8 slot when he was starting; in 1924, he batted .346 in 104 at bats. He had a career .239 average with 6 home runs and 106 RBI.

== Personal life ==
Cooper died of a heart attack at age 81 in Encino, California, and was buried on the Forest Lawn Memorial Park.

Cooper's great-grandson is Keoni DeRenne.

== See also ==
- List of Major League Baseball career wins leaders
- List of Major League Baseball annual wins leaders
