= Russell Martin (baseball) =

Canadian baseball player (born 1983)

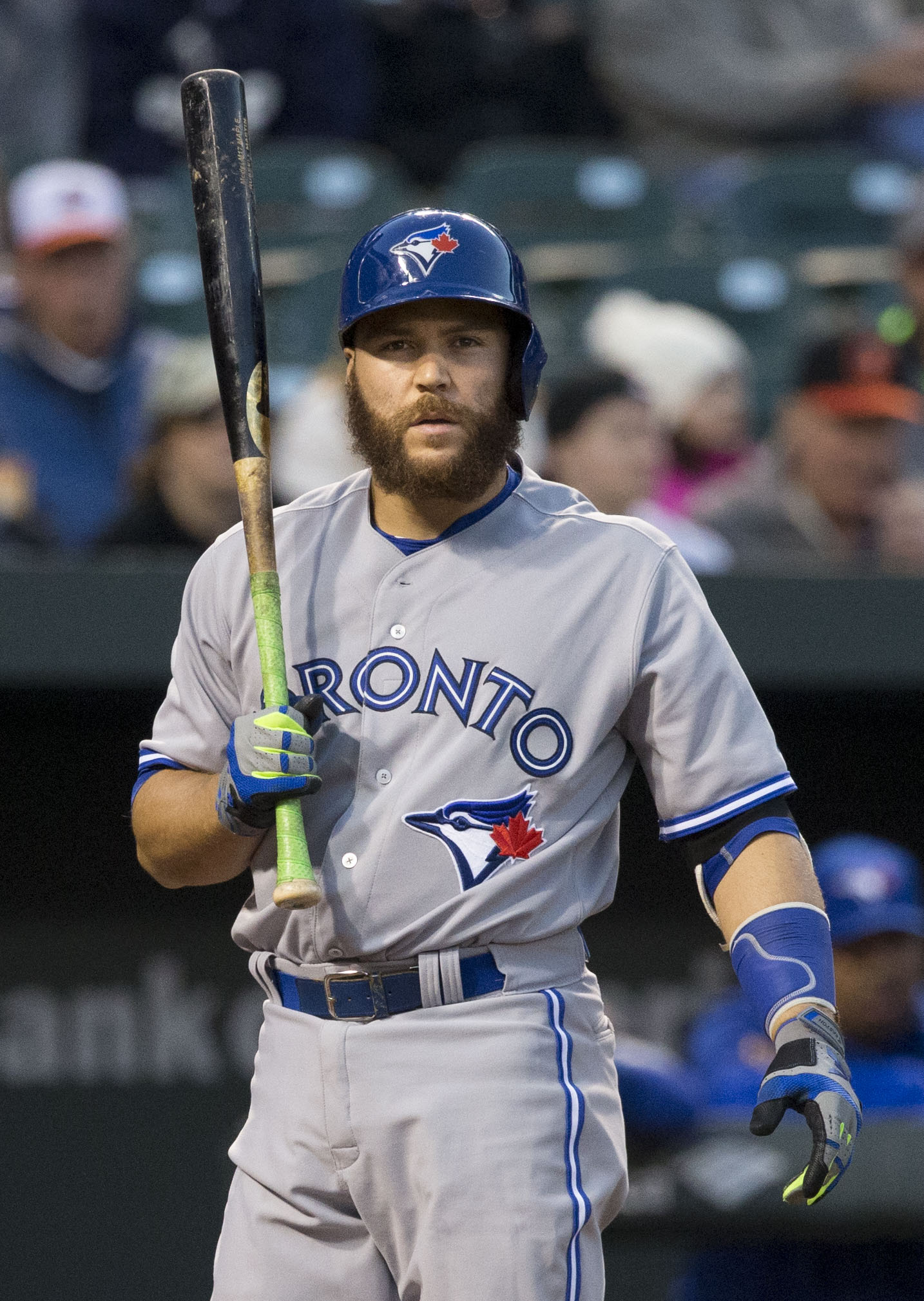
- Martin with the Toronto Blue Jays in 2015
- Catcher
- Born: February 15, 1983 (age 43); East York, Ontario, Canada
- Batted: Right Threw: Right

MLB debut
- May 5, 2006, for the Los Angeles Dodgers

Last MLB appearance
- September 28, 2019, for the Los Angeles Dodgers

MLB statistics
- Batting average: .248
- Home runs: 191
- Runs batted in: 771
- Stats at Baseball Reference

Teams
- Los Angeles Dodgers (2006–2010); New York Yankees (2011–2012); Pittsburgh Pirates (2013–2014); Toronto Blue Jays (2015–2018); Los Angeles Dodgers (2019)

Career highlights and awards
- 4× All-Star (2007, 2008, 2011, 2015); Gold Glove Award (2007); Silver Slugger Award (2007)

Member of the Canadian

Baseball Hall of Fame
- Induction: 2024

Russell Nathan Coltrane Jeanson Martin Jr. (born February 15, 1983) is a Canadian former professional baseball catcher. He played in Major League Baseball (MLB) for the Los Angeles Dodgers, New York Yankees, Pittsburgh Pirates, and Toronto Blue Jays, and is a four-time MLB All-Star. In 2007, Martin won the Gold Glove Award and Silver Slugger Award.

Martin became the everyday catcher for the Los Angeles Dodgers immediately upon his MLB debut in 2006, and continued in that role for nearly five years. His offensive and defensive performance earned wide accolades during his first three years, but they diminished significantly in 2009 and 2010. Martin spent the last two months of 2010 on the disabled list. After the Dodgers declined to offer him arbitration in 2011, he signed with the Yankees and succeeded Jorge Posada as the Yankees' everyday catcher.

In November 2012, Martin signed a two-year free agent contract with the Pirates, and took over the team's everyday catcher duties. Following the 2014 season, he signed a five-year, $82 million contract with the Blue Jays. In January 2019, he was traded back to the Dodgers.

== Professional career ==
=== Draft and minor leagues (2002–2006) ===
Martin was selected in the 35th round of the 2000 Major League Baseball draft by the Montreal Expos, but did not sign. He then attended Chipola College for two years before being chosen in the 17th round of the 2002 Major League Baseball draft by the Los Angeles Dodgers. Drafted as a third baseman, Martin played his first professional season with the Gulf Coast Dodgers, and hit .286 with 10 RBI in 41 games. In the offseason, he was converted to a catcher. Martin played the 2003 minor league season with the Ogden Raptors, and was later promoted to the Class-A South Georgia Waves. In 77 combined games, he batted .276 with 9 home runs and 50 RBI.

Martin was a Florida State League All-Star catcher while with the Vero Beach Dodgers in 2004, playing 122 games and batting .250 with 15 home runs and 64 RBI. During the offseason, Martin played with the Scottsdale Scorpions of the Arizona Fall League. In 2005, he played in a career-high 129 games for the Double-A Jacksonville Suns and made the All-Star team, hitting .311 with 9 home runs and 61 RBI. Martin began the 2006 season with the Triple-A Las Vegas 51s, where he hit .297 in 23 games before his promotion.

=== Los Angeles Dodgers (2006–2010) ===
Martin was promoted to the Dodgers on May 5, 2006, after a wrist injury to starting catcher Dioner Navarro. He got two hits, including a double, in the game. His first hit was against Chris Capuano. On May 7, he hit his first major league home run against Milwaukee Brewers pitcher Dave Bush. On June 6, 2006, Martin and Éric Gagné made baseball history by becoming the first French Canadian battery in the majors. Martin's play was good enough that, on June 26, 2006, Navarro was traded to the Tampa Bay Devil Rays. On August 13, 2006, Martin hit his first career walk-off home run in a victory that completed a sweep of the rival San Francisco Giants. On September 18, 2006, Martin hit a solo home run off of Trevor Hoffman, the third of four consecutive home runs in the bottom of the 9th inning to tie the San Diego Padres. It was the first time four home runs had been hit in a row since the 1964 Minnesota Twins.

On April 21, 2007, Martin hit a walk-off grand slam against Pittsburgh Pirates pitcher Shawn Chacón in the bottom of the 10th inning. This was the first grand slam of his career.

In May 2007, Martin broke the Dodgers' franchise record for single-season steals by a catcher (12) set by John Roseboro in 1962. On July 1, it was announced that Martin finished in first place in All-Star Game voting, leading Paul Lo Duca by 296,948 votes. He became the first ever Canadian born catcher to start the All-Star Game.

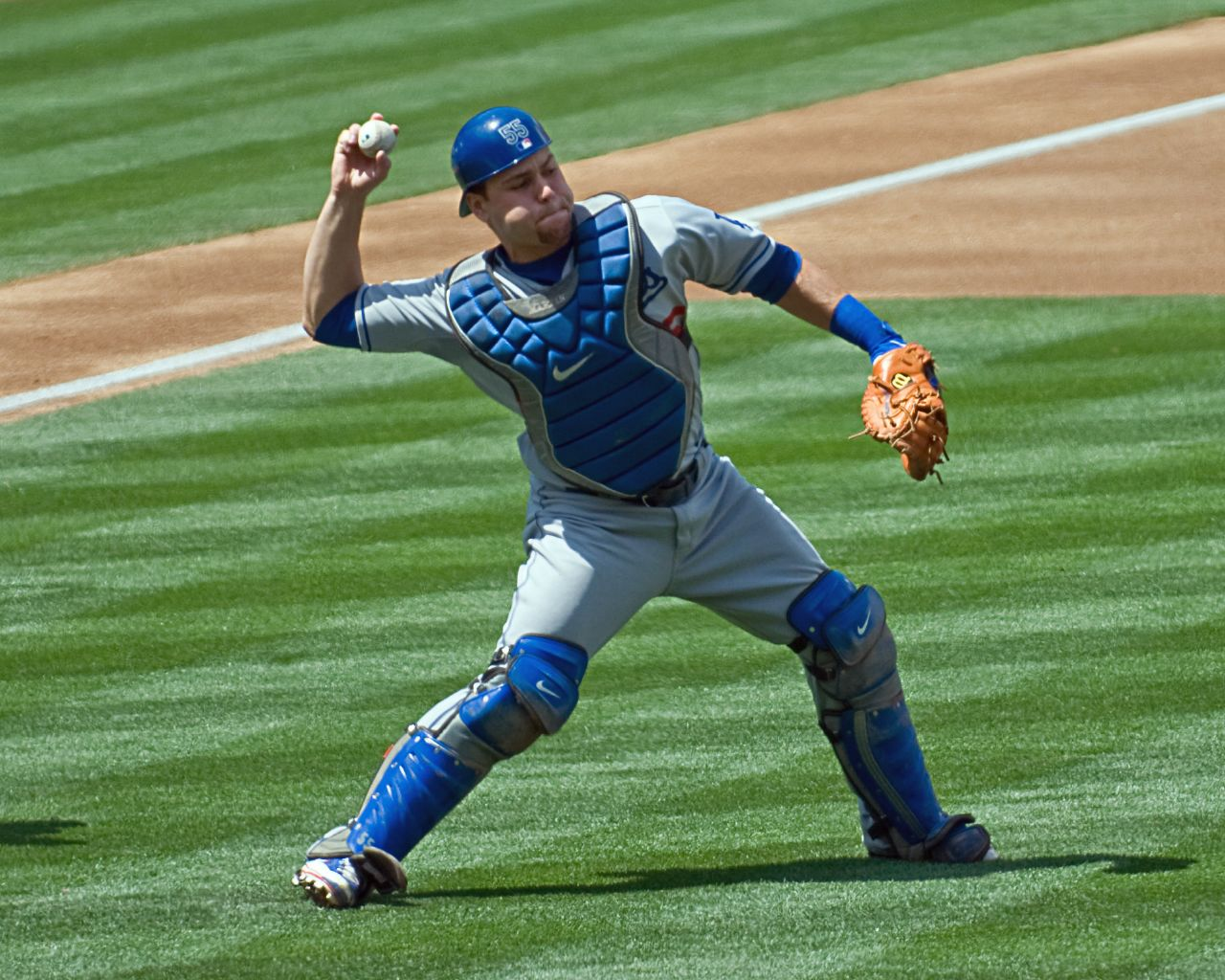
Martin with the Los Angeles Dodgers in 2008

At the end of the 2007 season, he was awarded with the National League Gold Glove Award and the Silver Slugger Award.

On May 2, 2008, Martin started his first game at third base since reaching the Majors, allowing veteran backup Gary Bennett to spell Martin behind the plate. Martin made his second all-star game during the 2008 season. He caught 10 innings of a 15 inning game in which the American League won 4–3. Martin's 10 innings caught are tied for fourth place all time among all star catchers in a single game.

On January 20, 2009, Martin signed a one-year, $3.9 million contract to avoid salary arbitration. The deal was the largest ever awarded to a catcher in his first year of arbitration. He played for the Canadian team during the 2009 World Baseball Classic and then rejoined the Dodgers. He slumped offensively in 2009, hitting only .250 with 7 home runs in 143 games, the weakest totals in his four-year career.

In 2010, Martin continued to regress as he hit .248 with 5 home runs and 26 RBI in 97 games. In August, Martin suffered a torn labrum in his right hip when he was trying to avoid a tag at home plate in a game against the Padres. The injury kept him sidelined for the rest of the season.

Due to his uncertain recovery from injury and declining production, and concern that Martin would be awarded a salary as high as $6 million in arbitration, the Dodgers did not tender Martin a contract for 2011 and allowed him to become a free agent. The Dodgers offered Martin a one-year contract worth $4.2 million prior to the arbitration hearings but he insisted on receiving well above $5 million. After Martin rebuffed the Dodgers' offer, the Dodgers non-tendered him and signed journeyman catcher Rod Barajas, though hinting that Martin could still have a place on the team. Martin said the Dodgers had shown by avoiding arbitration that they no longer "believed in" him.

=== New York Yankees (2011–2012) ===
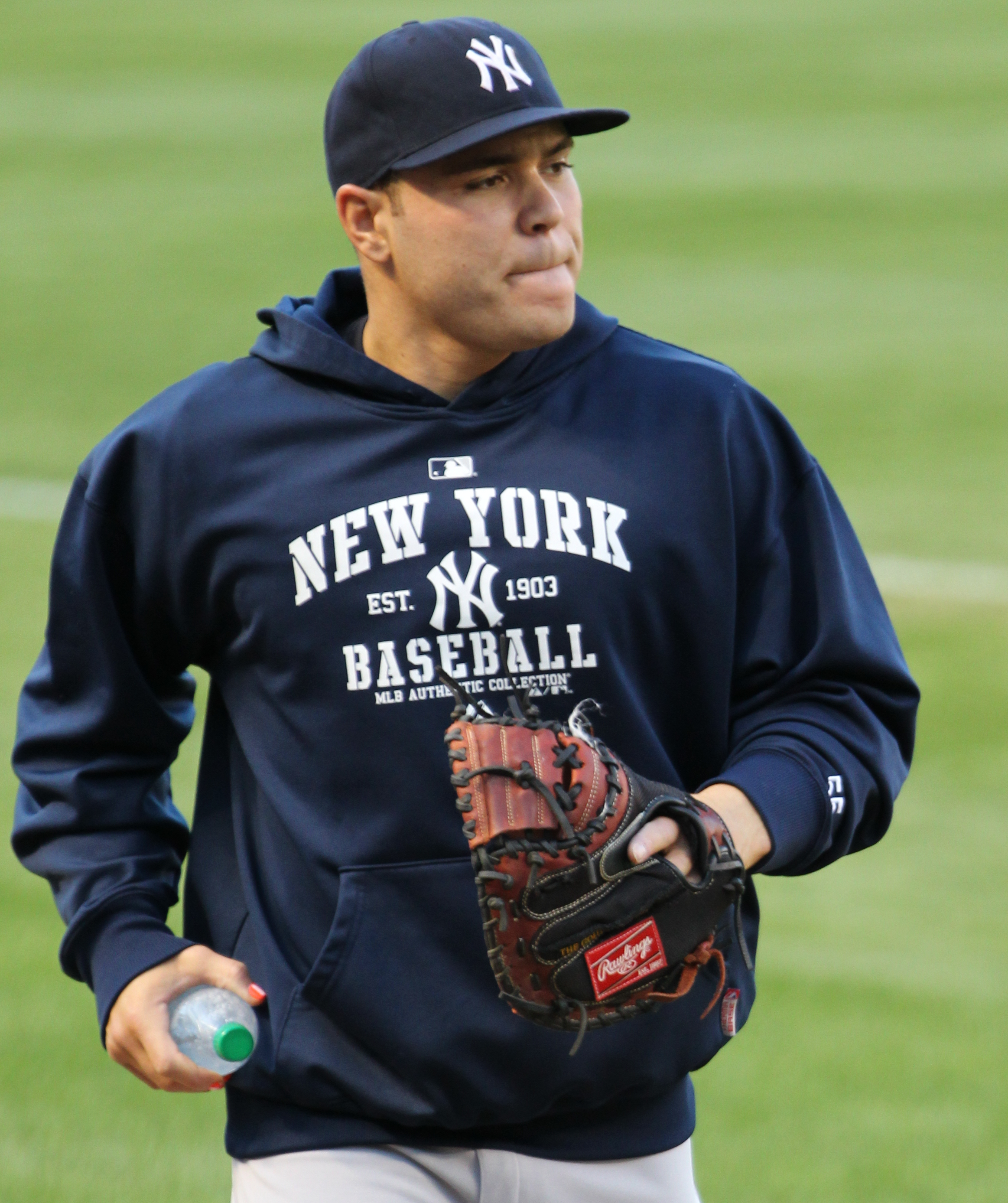
Martin with the New York Yankees in 2011

Martin agreed to a $6 million guaranteed one-year contract with the New York Yankees for the 2011 season. The value of the contract could reach $9.4 million if he caught 110 games.

Martin began the 2011 season as the everyday catcher for the Yankees. He was elected to the 2011 American League All-Star team as a Yankee.

Along with Robinson Canó and Curtis Granderson, Martin was one of the Yankees' three batters who hit an MLB record three grand slams in a single game in a 22–9 rout of the Oakland Athletics at Yankee Stadium on August 25, 2011.

As a Super Two player, Martin was eligible for arbitration for a fourth time, and he signed a one-year, $7.5 million contract for the 2012 season with up to $100,000 in performance bonuses with the Yankees to avoid arbitration on January 24. He spent the year as the starting catcher with Chris Stewart as his backup. In 133 games, he hit .211 with 21 home runs and 53 RBI. Martin started all 9 games of the Yankees' postseason, going 5-for-31 with one home run.

=== Pittsburgh Pirates (2013–2014) ===
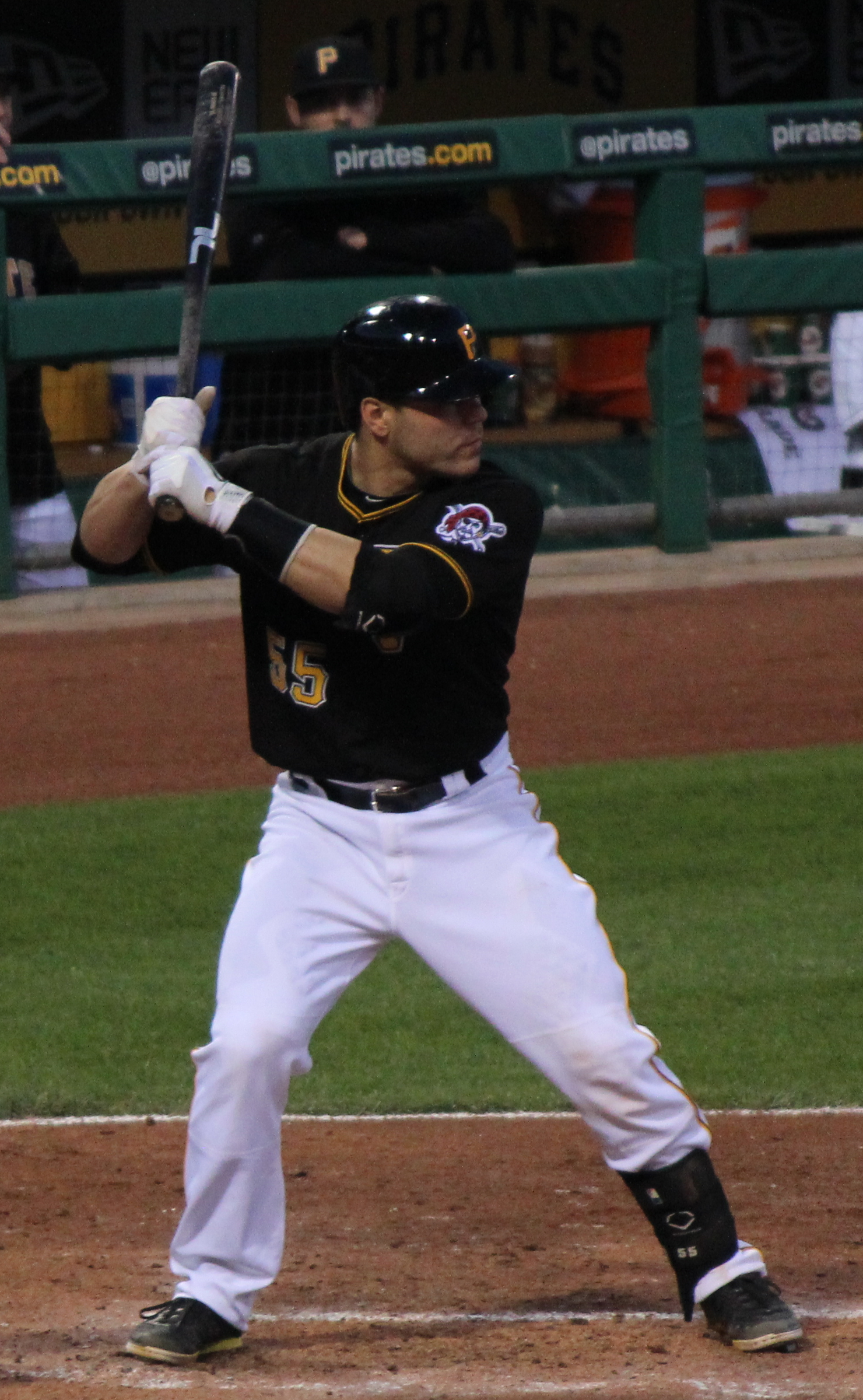
Martin with the Pittsburgh Pirates in 2013

On November 29, 2012, Ken Rosenthal reported that the Pittsburgh Pirates had signed Martin for two years and $17 million. The deal became official on November 30. On June 4, 2013, Martin made his first start and appearance at right field. On June 8, 2013, Martin hit his 100th career home run.

In the NL Wild Card Game on October 1, 2013, Martin hit a pair of solo home runs as the Pirates defeated the Cincinnati Reds 6-2. The first was off Reds starter Johnny Cueto. Cueto, having his name chanted by 40,000 Pirates fans, dropped the ball while on the mound. His next pitch, a fastball over the heart of the plate, was crushed into the left-field stands by Martin. This home run gave the Pirates the momentum to win the game, their first postseason victory in 21 years.

During a game against the Milwaukee Brewers on April 20, 2014, Martin was involved in a brawl which was started when Carlos Gómez hit a triple off Gerrit Cole after which Martin was suspended 2 games by the MLB on April 22, 2014, for his role in the brawl.

=== Toronto Blue Jays (2015–2018) ===
On November 18, 2014, the Toronto Blue Jays announced that they had signed Martin to a five-year, $82 million contract. Early in spring training, manager John Gibbons told reporters that Martin would be R. A. Dickey's catcher during practice and in preseason games, to give him the opportunity to practice catching Dickey's knuckleball. Martin received a standing ovation from the fans at Olympic Stadium on April 3, as the Blue Jays played their final two spring training games in Montreal for the second consecutive year. On April 19, 2015, Martin caught Jeff Francis in his debut for the Blue Jays, and in doing so formed the first all-Canadian battery in franchise history. On June 2, Martin stole home off the back end of a double steal, and became the first Blue Jay to steal home since Brett Lawrie did so in 2012. Martin established a new career-high in home runs on September 26, hitting his 22nd of the season to aid the Blue Jays to a 10–8 win over the Tampa Bay Rays. He ended the 2015 regular season with a .240 batting average, 23 home runs, and 77 RBI in 129 games. He led the major leagues in passed balls, with 19. Martin was announced as a finalist for the catcher Gold Glove award, along with Salvador Pérez and Jason Castro.

Martin appeared in 137 games for the Blue Jays in 2016, and hit .231 with 20 home runs and 74 RBI. He struggled in the postseason, recording only three hits in 33 at-bats.

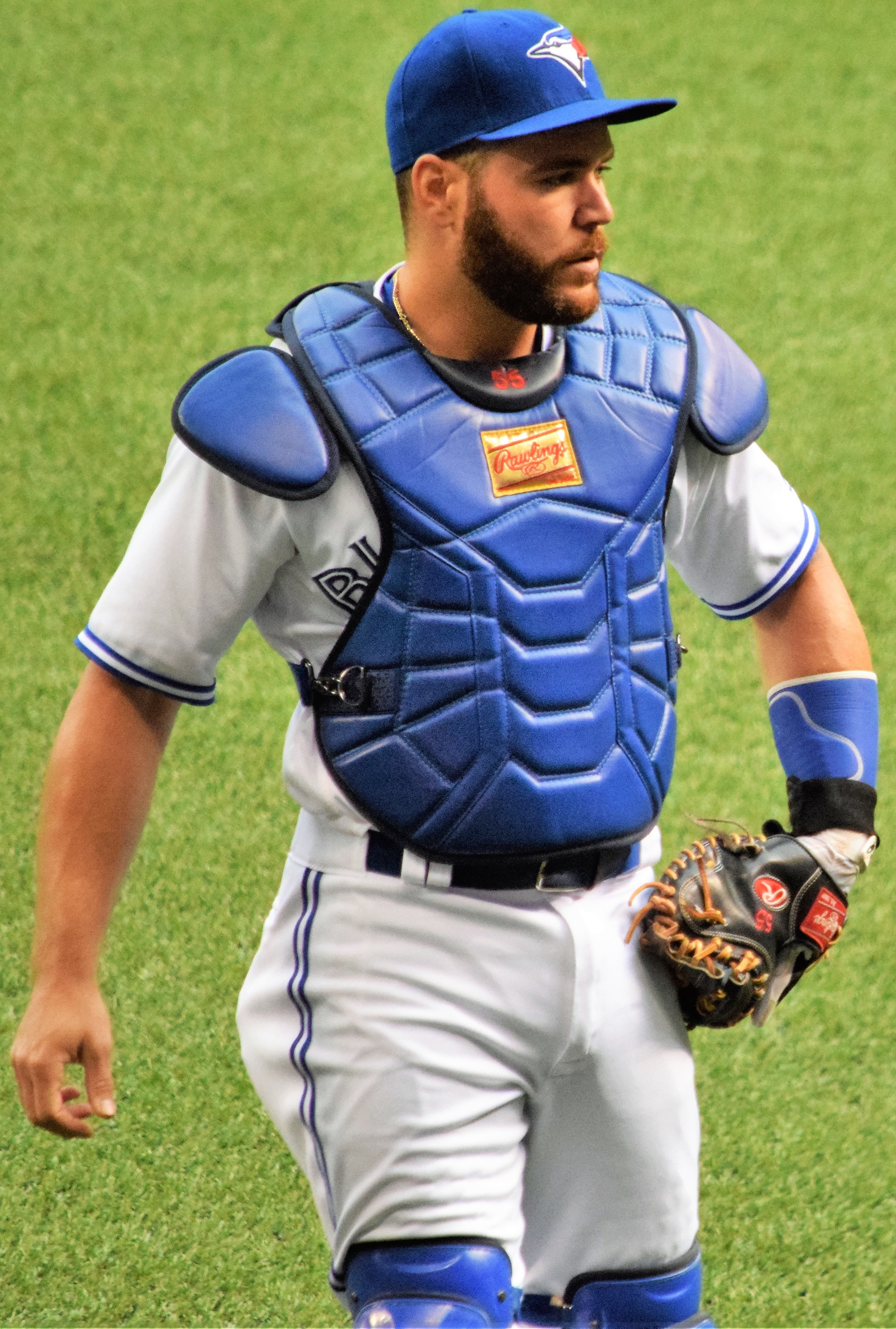
Russell Martin with the Toronto Blue Jays in 2017

On April 29, 2017, Martin became the 15th catcher to record 10,000 career putouts at the position.

On June 20, 2018, Martin became the 11th catcher to make 11,000 career putouts at the position. Martin endured his worst offensive season of his career, hitting .194 with 10 home runs and 25 RBIs. In the final game of the 2018 season, Martin managed the Blue Jays, the team wound up losing in his managerial debut.

=== Return to the Dodgers (2019) ===
On January 11, 2019, the Blue Jays traded Martin to the Dodgers for prospects Ronny Brito and Andrew Sopko. The Blue Jays also sent $16.4 million to offset most of Martin's $20 million salary. Martin spent the 2019 season as the Dodgers' backup catcher, first behind Austin Barnes and then Will Smith.

On March 30, 2019, Martin pitched the top of the ninth inning in the Dodgers' 18-5 win over the Arizona Diamondbacks. He made ten pitches and retired three straight batters, becoming the first major league position player to pitch and complete the ninth inning of a game that his team won since left fielder Willie Smith did so for the Detroit Tigers on September 23, 1963. Martin also became the first position player to pitch a 1-2-3 ninth inning in a team win since at least 1925. On August 28, 2019, Martin became the first position player to pitch in a shutout victory since October 3, 1917, when George Kelly of the New York Giants did so. In what would be his last season in the majors, Martin played in 83 games for the Dodgers in 2019, hitting .220 with six homers and 20 RBI.

On May 28, 2022, Martin announced his retirement, via an Instagram post.

== International career ==
Martin was first selected to play for Canada during the 2009 World Baseball Classic.

In an effort to quit the use of chewing tobacco in 2009, Martin began wearing a custom-fitted mouthpiece during the WBC and Spring training.

Martin hoped to switch to shortstop during the 2013 World Baseball Classic, citing he did not want to learn another pitching staff during the tournament because he was already learning a new staff in Pittsburgh. Martin had played third base in the minors before becoming a catcher. Martin would later withdraw his name, citing soreness.

On December 5, 2016, Martin committed to play shortstop for Team Canada at the 2017 World Baseball Classic. However, Martin was left off Team Canada's WBC roster on February 8, 2017, due to insurance complications relating to his offseason minor knee surgery.

== Personal life ==
Martin was born in Toronto, Ontario, and spent his early childhood in Montreal and Chelsea, Quebec. After he had become successful as a professional ballplayer, his childhood ballpark in Chelsea was refurbished and named after him. Along with playing baseball in the Montreal neighbourhood of Notre-Dame-de-Grâce, Martin played hockey for N.D.G. Minor Hockey. He graduated from Polyvalente Édouard-Montpetit High School. After graduating from high school, Martin took a junior college scholarship at Chipola College in Marianna, Florida, United States.

Martin is biracial: his father, Russell Martin Sr., is Black Canadian, while his mother, Suzanne Jeanson, is Franco-Manitoban. His full name is Russell Nathan Coltrane Jeanson Martin Jr. He was named Russell for his father, Nathan for a great-grandfather, Jeanson after his mother's family, and Coltrane to pay homage to musician John Coltrane, whom his father admired. Martin's parents separated when Martin was two years old. His father used to play saxophone in Montreal metro stations to help pay for his son's baseball training. Martin Sr. played O Canada on his saxophone before a 2015 spring training game.

When Martin was nine years old, his mother remarried. She moved to Paris, France, with her new husband and daughter. Russell Jr. would split his time living between his mother in Paris and his father in Montreal for a year. Martin changed the name printed on his jersey to "J. Martin" for the 2009 season in reference to "Jeanson", in honour of his mother.

== See also ==
- List of Canadian sports personalities
- List of Major League Baseball career assists leaders
- List of Major League Baseball career double plays leaders
- List of Major League Baseball career games played as a catcher leaders
- List of Major League Baseball career hit by pitch leaders
- List of Major League Baseball career putouts leaders
- List of Major League Baseball home run records
- List of Major League Baseball players from Canada
- List of Major League Baseball players with a home run in their final major league at bat
- List of Major League Baseball postseason records
- List of Pittsburgh Pirates award winners and league leaders
- List of Toronto Blue Jays team records
- Los Angeles Dodgers award winners and league leaders
- Toronto Blue Jays award winners and league leaders
