= Bob Veale =

American baseball player (1935–2025)

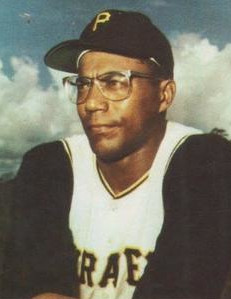
- Veale in 1966
- Pitcher
- Born: October 28, 1935; Birmingham, Alabama, U.S.
- Died: January 3, 2025 (aged 89); Birmingham, Alabama, U.S.
- Batted: Switch Threw: Left

MLB debut
- April 16, 1962, for the Pittsburgh Pirates

Last MLB appearance
- September 8, 1974, for the Boston Red Sox

MLB statistics
- Win–loss record: 120–95
- Earned run average: 3.07
- Strikeouts: 1,703
- Stats at Baseball Reference

Teams
- Pittsburgh Pirates (1962–1972); Boston Red Sox (1972–1974)

Career highlights and awards
- 2× All-Star (1965, 1966); World Series champion (1971); NL strikeout leader (1964)

Robert Andrew Veale (October 28, 1935 – January 3, 2025) was an American professional baseball pitcher and coach. He played in Major League Baseball (MLB) as a left-handed pitcher from 1962 through 1974 for the Pittsburgh Pirates and Boston Red Sox.

Veale was one of the top strikeout pitchers in the National League during his tenure with the Pirates. The two-time All-Star was the league's strikeout leader in 1964. He was a member of the Pirates teams that won three consecutive National League Eastern Division titles between 1970 and 1972 and won the World Series in 1971. Veale finished his career playing for the Boston Red Sox from 1972 to 1974.

== Early life ==
Veale was born on October 28, 1935, in Birmingham, Alabama, where he attended Holy Family High School in the Ensley neighborhood. His father had played baseball as a pitcher for the Homestead Grays of the Negro National League. As a boy, Veale worked the concession stand at Birmingham's historic Rickwood Field. Birmingham Black Barons player-manager Piper Davis made Veale the team's batboy and let him pitch batting practice regularly. In 1948, Davis allowed the underaged Veale to pitch in a Black Barons game; however, because he was a minor, his appearance was kept off the records. Veale left Birmingham in 1955 to attend Benedictine College in Atchison, Kansas, on an athletic scholarship, playing both baseball and basketball for the Ravens.

== Minor league career ==
In 1958, Veale signed with the Pittsburgh Pirates as an amateur free agent. In 1959, he led the Carolina League with 187 strikeouts in 147 innings pitched for the Wilson Tobs. He also threw a no-hitter. His performance earned him a promotion to the Columbus Jets of the International League, where he established himself as a strikeout pitcher in 1961 by striking out a league-leading 208 batters in 201 innings.

== Major league career ==
Veale made his major league debut with the Pirates on April 16, 1962, at the age of 26. He had a complete game victory in his second major league game but then struggled and was sent back to Columbus on May 25. On August 10, he set an International League record for the most strikeouts in a game with 22 against the Buffalo Bisons. On September 3, he pitched a one-hitter against Jacksonville and struck out 15 batters. After striking out 179 batters in 134 innings and winning eight games, Veale was called back by the Pirates in September and finished his rookie year with a 2–2 record, one save and 3.74 ERA over 11 games.

Veale began 1963 pitching out of the pen until Pirates manager Danny Murtaugh made him a starting pitcher in August 1963 and he responded impressively in September by throwing three complete games in six starts, including two shutouts. On September 22, 1964, Veale struck out 15 Milwaukee Braves to set the Pirates team record for most strikeouts in a nine-inning game, breaking the previous record of 12 set by Babe Adams in 1909.

Veale was the Pirates opening day starter for the 1964 season. He led the National League with 250 strikeouts in 1964 (including a team-record 15 strikeouts against the Milwaukee Braves in a 2–0 loss on September 22 and an astounding 16 strikeouts against the Cincinnati Reds on September 30 in a16-inning no decision), ending the season with a career-high win–loss record of 18–12 and a 2.74 earned run average (ERA).

Veale's emergence as one of the top strikeout pitchers in the league helped earn him a spot on the National League team in the 1965 All-Star Game. He struck out 16 batters on June 1 against the Philadelphia Phillies to break his own team record. In 1965, he improved his personal best with a career-high 276 strikeouts, but finished a distant second to Sandy Koufax's then-Major League record 382 strikeouts. He ended the season with a 17–12 win–loss record and a 2.84 ERA to help the Pirates improve to a third place finish in the National League. As of 2024, his 276 strikeouts in a season remains a Pirates modern-era team record.

Veale was an integral member of the Pirates pitching staff during the 1966 season posting a 16–12 record and a 3.02 ERA in 37 starts and was again named to the National League team for the 1966 All-Star Game. The 1966 Pirates team which, included future Baseball Hall of Fame members Roberto Clemente, Bill Mazeroski and Willie Stargell as well as the National League batting champion Matty Alou, fought the Los Angeles Dodgers and San Francisco Giants in a tight pennant race and were in first place on September 10, before they faltered to finish the season in third place for a second consecutive year. Veale began the 1967 season by winning his first six starts and seven of his first eight starts. He ended the season with 16 victories against 8 losses but, his ERA rose to 3.64.

An elbow injury in 1968 forced him to alter his pitching motion and reduced his strikeout rates. Veale had a losing record of 13–14 but had an impressive 2.05 ERA, the lowest ERA since 1914 by a pitcher with more than 20 starts and a losing record. In 1969, Veale had his last 200-plus strikeout season but in 1970 his ERA rose to 3.92. Veale had maintained a 200-plus inning workload for seven consecutive seasons between 1964 and 1970. There were rumors that he might be traded prior to the 1971 season but instead, Murtaugh moved him to the bullpen.

The 1971 season turned to be one of the most successful in team history as the Pirates won the National League Eastern Division. Veale had a 6–0 record in 37 appearances out the bullpen. Although his ERA was a very high 6.99, he pitched strongly in September as the Pirates made their push for the division title. On September 1, 1971, the Pirates became the first major league team to start a lineup of all minorities. Veale entered the game in the third inning in relief of starter Dock Ellis. The Pirates then defeated the San Francisco Giants three games to one in the 1971 National League Championship Series to face the Baltimore Orioles in the 1971 World Series. In the only postseason appearance of his career, he faced five batters, allowing two inherited runners to score on two walks and one hit as the Orioles won 11–3 in Game 2. The Pirates won the World Series in seven games.

On May 10, 1972, the Pirates released Veale and he agreed to accept an assignment to the Pirates' Triple-A team in Charleston. On September 1, the Boston Red Sox signed Veale and used him as a relief pitcher. He pitched well enough to earn a spot with Boston in 1973, where he had 11 saves and 3.47 ERA. Veale began the next season playing for Triple-A Pawtucket, before joining the Red Sox in May. He pitched in 18 games that season and made his final major league appearance on September 8, 1974, at the age of 38.

== Career statistics ==
In a thirteen-season major league career, Veale posted a 120–95 record with 1,703 strikeouts and a 3.07 ERA in 1,926 innings pitched, including 20 shutouts and 78 complete games. His lifetime ratio of 7.96 strikeouts per nine innings is still a Pirates career team record, ranks fifth all-time for pitchers with 1,500-plus innings, and 65th overall on the MLB all-time list. His 16 strikeouts in a game remains a Pirates team record. When he retired in 1974, he was the only Pirate pitcher to have 200 strikeouts in a season. Veale ranks second to Bob Friend in Pirates career strikeouts. He also led the National League in walks four times.

== Later life ==
After his playing career, Veale worked as a minor-league pitching instructor for the Atlanta Braves and the New York Yankees. He also served as a groundskeeper at Rickwood Field, the oldest baseball stadium in the United States.

In 1990, Veale was inducted into his college's Raven Hall of Fame and in 2006, Veale was inducted into the Alabama Sports Hall of Fame.

== Personal life and death ==
Veale married his high school sweetheart, Eredean, in 1973.

Veale died in Birmingham, Alabama on January 3, 2025, at the age of 89.

== See also ==
- List of Major League Baseball annual strikeout leaders
- List of Major League Baseball career FIP leaders
