= Kent Tekulve =

American baseball player (born 1947)

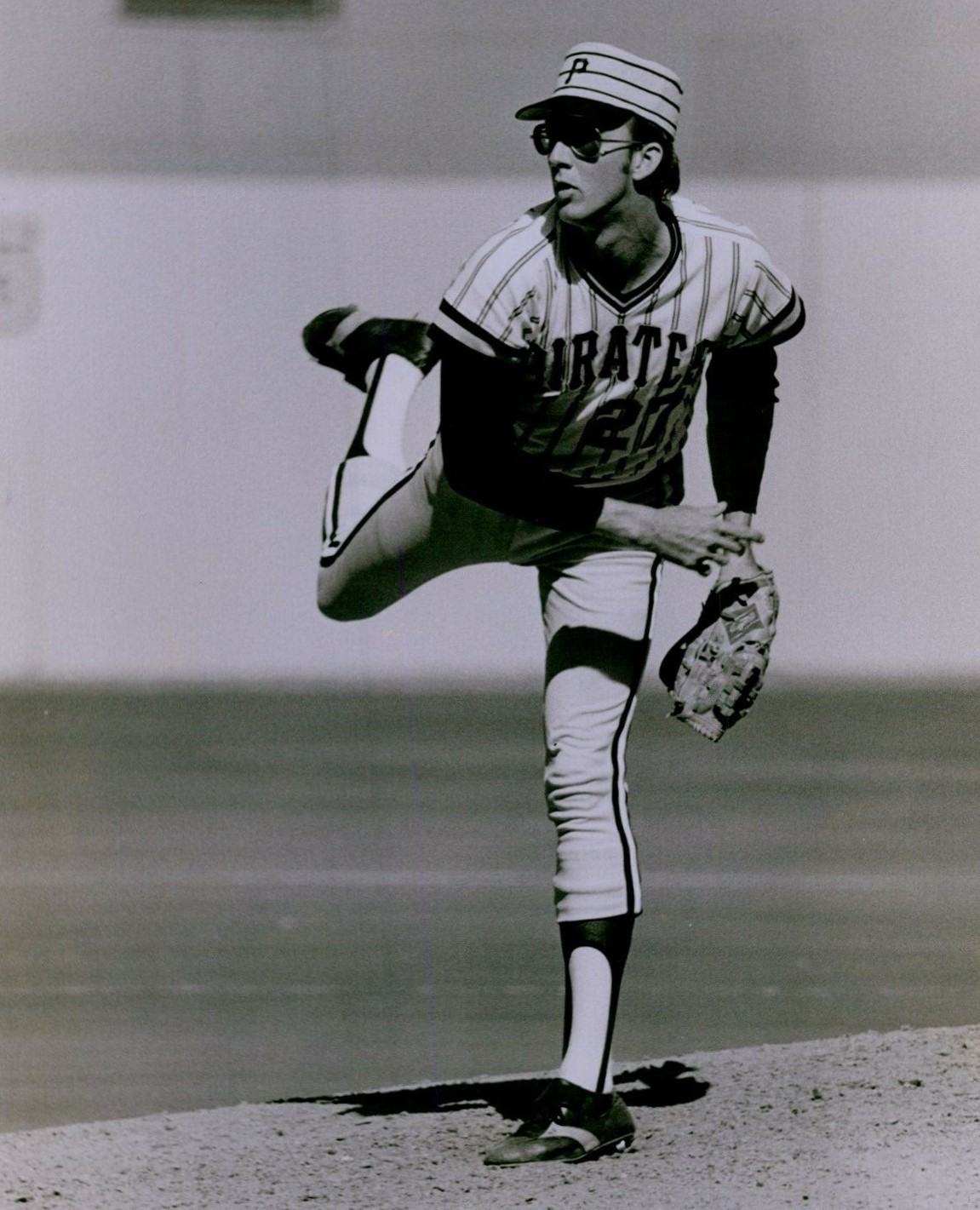
- Tekulve with the Pittsburgh Pirates in 1977
- Pitcher
- Born: March 5, 1947 (age 79); Cincinnati, Ohio, U.S.
- Batted: Right Threw: Right

MLB debut
- May 20, 1974, for the Pittsburgh Pirates

Last MLB appearance
- July 16, 1989, for the Cincinnati Reds

MLB statistics
- Win–loss record: 94–90
- Earned run average: 2.85
- Strikeouts: 779
- Saves: 184
- Stats at Baseball Reference

Teams
- Pittsburgh Pirates (1974–1985); Philadelphia Phillies (1985–1988); Cincinnati Reds (1989)

Career highlights and awards
- All-Star (1980); World Series champion (1979); Pittsburgh Pirates Hall of Fame

Kenton Charles Tekulve (/təˈkʌlˌviː/ tə-KUL-vee; born March 5, 1947), nicknamed "The Scarecrow", is an American former professional baseball right-handed relief pitcher who played 16 seasons in Major League Baseball (MLB), primarily for the Pittsburgh Pirates. He also played for the Philadelphia Phillies and Cincinnati Reds. Pitching with an unusual submarine delivery, Tekulve was known as a workhorse relief pitcher who holds several records for number of games pitched and innings pitched.

== Career ==
Tekulve is a 1969 graduate of Marietta College in Marietta, Ohio. He signed that year as a free agent with the Pittsburgh Pirates and remained with that organization until 1985. He made his major league debut against the Montreal Expos on May 20, 1974. He pitched an inning of relief and allowed one hit in the 4–2 loss.

His best seasons came in 1978 and 1979, in both of which he saved 31 games and posted ERAs of 2.33 and 2.75, respectively. He won National League Pitcher of the Month for August 1978. He saved three games in the 1979 World Series, including the winner, as the Pirates defeated the Baltimore Orioles 4 games to 3. He was selected as an All-Star in 1980.

He was traded from the Pirates to the Phillies for Al Holland and minor-league left-handed pitcher Frankie Griffin on April 20, 1985. He continued to be an effective reliever into his 40s. Only in his first season (1974) and his last season (1989) did he post an ERA above 4. While with the Phillies, he led the NL in games pitched for the fourth time, with 90 in 1987 at the age of 40.

Tekulve signed with the Cincinnati Reds before the 1989 season and pitched in 37 games before retiring in July.

In a 16-year career, Tekulve compiled a 94-90 won-loss record with a 2.85 ERA, 779 strikeouts, and 184 saves. He had no starts or complete games in his MLB career.

At the plate, he posted a .083 batting average (10-for-121) with no extra-base hits and 2 runs batted in in 132 plate appearances. Defensively, he recorded a .970 fielding percentage which was 18 points higher than the league average at his position.

== Records ==
Tekulve led the National League in games pitched four times, appearing in 90 or more games three times. He and Mike Marshall are the only pitchers in baseball history to appear in 90 or more games more than once, having each done the feat three times. Tekulve is also the oldest pitcher ever to appear in 90 games, when he did so in 1987 at age 40. Tekulve's three saves in the 1979 World Series tied the single-Series mark set by Roy Face in the 1960 World Series; it was broken by John Wetteland in 1996. He holds the National League record for career innings pitched in relief (1,436 2/3), and formerly held the major league record for career relief appearances; his 1,050 career games, all in relief, ranked second in major league history to Hoyt Wilhelm's 1,070 when he retired. Tekulve owns the career records for most appearances and innings pitched without making a single start. In 1986, he broke Roy Face's NL record of 846 career games pitched; he held the record until John Franco passed him in 2004. In August of 1987, he pitched on nine consecutive days, a record for pitchers.

Tekulve holds the record for most career losses without having given up any earned runs, with 12, as well as the record for most intentional walks issued, with 179.

== Post-playing career ==
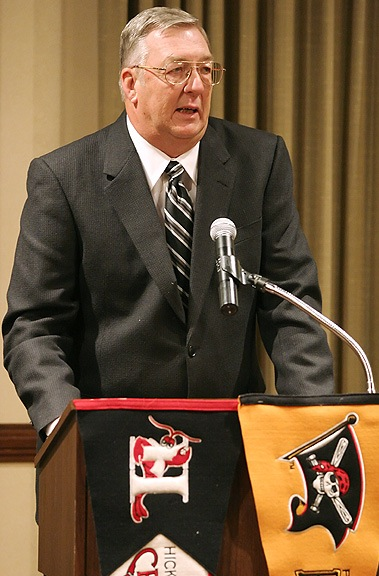
Tekulve in 2007

Tekulve appeared in a 1983 episode of Mister Rogers' Neighborhood to explain how people play baseball.

Tekulve was a member of the Philadelphia Phillies television broadcast team from 1991 to 1997.

After several years involvement with the Washington Wild Things of the independent Frontier League, Tekulve took a job as the Pittsburgh Pirates' advance scout in 2006.

Tekulve worked for AT&T SportsNet Pittsburgh (formerly FSN Pittsburgh and later Root Sports Pittsburgh) and appeared as an analyst after each Pittsburgh Pirates game from 2008 until early in the 2014 season. Tekulve underwent heart transplantation surgery on September 5, 2014, after spending eight months on the transplant list. The surgery was performed at Allegheny General Hospital.

Tekulve threw out the ceremonial first pitch at the National League Wild Card Game between the Pittsburgh Pirates and San Francisco Giants on October 1, 2014.

Tekulve continued broadcasting for the Pirates through the 2017 season, when he retired.

== See also ==
- List of Major League Baseball career games finished leaders
- List of Pittsburgh Pirates team records
