= Fleury Sullivan =

American baseball player (1862–1897)

- Pitcher
- Born: 1862; East St. Louis, Illinois
- Died: February 8, 1897 (aged 34–35); East St. Louis, Illinois
- Batted: Unknown Threw: Unknown

MLB debut
- May 3, 1884, for the Pittsburgh Alleghenys

Last MLB appearance
- October 15, 1884, for the Pittsburgh Alleghenys

MLB statistics
- Win–loss record: 16–35
- Strikeouts: 189
- Earned Run Average: 4.20
- Stats at Baseball Reference

Teams
- Pittsburgh Alleghenys (1884)

Florence P. Sullivan (1862 – February 8, 1897), was an American professional baseball player who played pitcher in Major League Baseball for the Pittsburgh Alleghenys in 1884. Sullivan has the record for most strikeouts in a career that lasted only one season, with 189.
