= Bob Friend =

American baseball player (1930–2019)

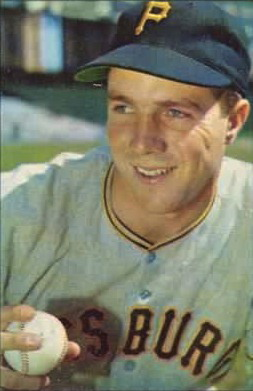
- Friend, circa 1953
- Pitcher
- Born: November 24, 1930; Lafayette, Indiana, U.S.
- Died: February 3, 2019 (aged 88); O'Hara Township, Pennsylvania, U.S.
- Batted: Right Threw: Right

MLB debut
- April 28, 1951, for the Pittsburgh Pirates

Last MLB appearance
- September 24, 1966, for the New York Mets

MLB statistics
- Win–loss record: 197–230
- Earned run average: 3.58
- Strikeouts: 1,734
- Stats at Baseball Reference

Teams
- Pittsburgh Pirates (1951–1965); New York Yankees (1966); New York Mets (1966)

Career highlights and awards
- 4× All-Star (1956, 1958, 1960, 1960²); World Series champion (1960); MLB wins leader (1958); NL ERA leader (1955); Pittsburgh Pirates Hall of Fame

Robert Bartmess Friend (November 24, 1930 – February 3, 2019) was an American professional baseball player. He played in Major League Baseball as a right-handed pitcher between 1951 and 1966, most notably as a member of the Pittsburgh Pirates. A four-time All-Star, Friend was an integral member of the Pirates team that defeated the New York Yankees in the 1960 World Series. He played for the New York Yankees and New York Mets in his final season of 1966. As of 2019, he still held Pirates records for career innings pitched and strikeouts. He was the first man to lead the league in ERA while pitching for a last place team.

Friend was inducted into the Indiana Baseball Hall of Fame in 1979. Later, Friend would be enrolled into the Pittsburgh Pirates Hall of Fame as a part of the class of 2023.

== Early life ==
Friend was born in Lafayette, Indiana, and grew up in nearby West Lafayette. His father was an orchestra leader, and Friend studied piano seriously until age sixteen, about the time of his father's death. At West Lafayette High School, Friend was an all-state football halfback and an all-state pitcher on the baseball team, and also played basketball and golf.

Friend's father and many other family members had attended Purdue University before he came of age, and Friend dreamed of playing college football for Purdue, as well as pursuing a baseball career. However, a high school shoulder injury led him to focus on baseball, and he signed a professional contract with the Pittsburgh Pirates. He enrolled at Purdue in the fall of 1949, but was ineligible for college athletics. Friend attended Purdue during baseball off-seasons for eight years, eventually earning a bachelor's degree in economics in 1957, and was a member of the Sigma Chi fraternity.

Entering Pittsburgh's farm system in 1950, Friend pitched for the Waco Pirates minor league team in the Big State League, compiling a 12–9 record. He was then promoted to the Indianapolis Indians of the Triple-A American Association, where he finished the year with a 2–4 record. Pittsburgh Pirates general manager Branch Rickey was anxious to develop young players quickly, and moved Friend onto the major league roster at the beginning of 1951.

== Major League career ==
In 1951, Friend joined the Pirates to begin the season, making his first appearance on June 28 in relief, allowing two hits over two innings of scoreless work in an eventual 4–2 loss to the Cincinnati Reds. He totaled 149.2 innings that season, making 22 starts and 12 relief appearances. On August 15, he pitched his first career shutout, blanking the St. Louis Cardinals 7–0 on two hits while striking out three. He also managed to walk eight batters that day. He ended up with a 6–10 record and a 4.27 ERA. the Pirates posted a 64–90 record, finishing ahead of only the last-place Chicago Cubs.

Friend began 1952 as Pittsburgh's number four starter. He opened the year with a shutout, striking out six Reds en route to a five-hit, 3–0 victory. He went 7–17 (NL third in losses) with a 4.18 ERA, allowing a respectable 9.0 H/9. The Bucs finished with a 42–112 record, their worst mark in 62 years.

Friend went 8–11, 4.90 in 1953. For the first time in his career, he struck out more batters than he walked (66 K's to 59 walks). On June 15, he earned his second win of the seasons, striking out six Milwaukee Braves in a complete game, 10-inning five-hitter, a 3–2 victory. Pittsburgh finished 55 games out of first place, going 50–104.

Friend made 35 appearances, 20 of them starts for the 1954 Pirates. He went 7–12 with a career-worst 5.07 ERA on the season. He defeated the Chicago Cubs, 4–0 in the back half of a doubleheader on September 14, allowing no walks and five hits while striking out five. In his next start, he earned a 1–0 win over the Brooklyn Dodgers by allowing six hits and no walks, whiffing three batters on September 19. Pittsburgh managed to improve their record by only three games, going 53–101.

In 1955 Friend posted a 14–9 record (NL fifth in wins, NL third-best .609 win percentage) and won the NL pitching title with an NL-best 2.83 ERA. 20 of his 44 appearances were starts, and he finished 16th in the NL MVP vote. His 6.0 pWAR also ranked him first in the league. He allowed 7.997 hits per nine innings pitched (NL sixth) with a 1.148 WHIP (NL third). His 50 defensive assists from the hill was the most in the league. On September 7, he struck out eight Cubs while allowing a single baserunner, a single to opposing left fielder Frank Baumholtz in a 2–0 win over Chicago. Despite his success, the Pirates still finished in last, at 60–94.

In 1956, Friend led the NL with 42 starts (in 49 appearances) and with 314.1 innings pitched. He was selected to his first All-Star team and was the winning pitcher of the 1956 All-Star Game. He finished 12th in the NL MVP race. He went 17–17 (NL eighth in wins) with a 3.46 ERA. His 5.6 pWAR was good enough to rank second in the NL. He also racked up 166 strikeouts (NL third). On June 8, he struck out nine Cardinals in a complete game, 11-inning, 2–0 six-hit victory. The Pirates finished with a 66–88 record, six games ahead of the last-place Cubs.

Friend again led the NL in starts in 1957, with 38, and in innings pitched, with 277. He compiled a 14–18 record with a 3.38 ERA (NL seventh). He registered a 1.231 WHIP (NL ninth), 143 strikeouts (NL sixth), and 17 complete games (NL second). On August 13, he pitched a two-hit victory, striking out five in a 6–0 victory over the Philadelphia Phillies. The team finished the year tied for last, at 62–92. Also this season, he earned his degree from Purdue University in Economics, a result of him having attended the school during the off-season for eight years.

In 1958 Friend was selected to his second All-Star team, finish sixth in the NL MVP race, and third for the NL Cy Young Award. He led the league in wins, going 22–14 with a 3.68 ERA. In 274 innings, (NL third), he racked up a 1.314 WHIP (NL ninth), 135 strikeouts (NL fifth), and 16 complete games (NL fifth). He ranked fourth in the NL with 10 sacrifice hits. He won his first four decisions of the season, but pitched only one shutout all year, a 2–0 win against St. Louis on August 3. He allowed nine hits and struck out two. The Pirates finished the year at 84–70, second only to the NL pennant-winning Milwaukee Braves, by eight games.

In 1959 Friend led the NL in losses, going 8–19 on the season with a 4.03 ERA. He placed second in the NL with 12 sacrifice hits. He earned his first win of the season on May 28 (against seven losses) by shutting out the Braves 3–0, striking out five and allowing four hits and two walks. Pittsburgh finished mid-pack, in fourth place, nine games back with a 78–76 record.

In 1960, Friend made the All-Star roster for the third time, leading the NL with 4.1 strikeouts per walk issued. He went 18–12 (NL fifth in wins) with a 3.00 ERA (also NL fifth). He posted a 5.6 pWAR (NL fourth), a 1.128 WHIP (NL third), and 183 strikeouts (NL fifth) over 257.2 innings (NL second). Of his NL third-best four shutouts, his best was probably on April 28, when he struck out 11 and allowed just four hits in a 3–0 win over the Phillies. The 95–59 Pirates finished seven games ahead of second-place Milwaukee for the NL pennant. The Pirates defeated the New York Yankees in the 1960 World Series in seven games. Of Pittsburgh's three losses, Friend was on the hook for two, racking up a 13.50 ERA over his three appearances.

Friend led the NL in losses for the second time in 1961, going 14–19 with a 3.85 ERA (his win total ranked him 10th in the league). He started 35 games (NL fourth), completing 10 and using 236 innings (NL 10th). He was undefeated through his first five starts (4–0, 3.20). This includes his start on April 19, when he defeated the Cubs, 4–1, allowing three hits and striking out seven. The Pirates regressed to 75–79, finishing a distant sixth in the eight-team National League.

In 1962, Friend went 18–14 (NL seventh in wins) with a 3.06 ERA (NL ninth) and a league-leading five shutouts. He had a 5.9 pWAR (NL fourth) with 13 complete games (NL ninth). His .984 fielding percentage at the position ranked him fourth in the NL. On opening day, April 10, he tossed a 6–0 shutout against the Phillies, allowing a walk with five hits while striking out five. On August 20, he blanked the expansion New York Mets, 2–0, whiffing six with two walks and four hits. Pittsburgh went 93–68, finishing in fourth place eight games behind the pennant-winning San Francisco Giants.

In 1963 Friend went 17–16 (NL ninth in wins) with career bests in ERA, 2.34 (NL third), H/9, at 7.9 (NL sixth), and WHIP, a 1.042 (NL fifth). He had a 5.8 pWAR (NL fourth). He defeated the Mets, 10–1, on June 1, striking out eight and allowing two hits. The run was unearned. At 74–88, the Pirates were the only non-expansion team to register a record below .500, placing in eighth.

Friend completed 13 (NL ninth) of 35 starts (NL seventh) with three shutouts (NL 10th), posting a 13–18 record with a 3.33 ERA in 1964. As in eight of the prior nine seasons, he ranked in the NL top ten in batters faced and in innings pitched. He went the distance on July 15 in a 3–0 shutout over the Phillies, allowing seven hits and striking out four. The Pirates finished tied for sixth at 80–82, 13 games behind pennant-winning St. Louis.

1965 marked the end of Friend's tenure in Pittsburgh, a season in which he went 8–12 with a 3.24 ERA over 34 starts. On July 23, he beat the Cubs 6–0, allowing a walk and two hits for his fifth win of the season. Pittsburgh closed out Friend's stay with a strong 90–72 campaign, seven games back of the Dodgers.

Friend played one more major league season, splitting the year between the two New York clubs. He went 1–4, 4.84 with the Yankees and 5–8, 4.40 with the Mets.

Friend wore #19 for the Yankees. After he was traded to the Mets, Fritz Peterson took over his uniform number.

In 15 full seasons with the Pirates, Friend finished 27 games below .500 on a team that went 1066–1285. Although never considered a Hall of Fame-caliber pitcher, with Vernon Law, especially in 1960, he was considered part of the best 1-2 combination in baseball, with Friend number 2.

== Personal life and death ==
In 1957, Friend married Patricia Koval, a nurse in the office of the Pirates' team doctor; they had two children, with son Bob Friend Jr. becoming a professional golfer who played on the PGA Tour.

Friend served as controller of Allegheny County, Pennsylvania, from 1967 to 1975. In 1976, he joined an insurance brokerage, eventually becoming a vice president. He was a three-time delegate to the Republican National Convention. He was a Freemason.

Friend died unexpectedly at his home in O'Hara Township, outside of Pittsburgh, on February 3, 2019, from cardiac arrest at the age of 88.

== See also ==
- List of Major League Baseball annual ERA leaders
- List of Major League Baseball annual wins leaders
