= Chicago Cubs all-time roster =

List of baseball players

The Chicago Cubs baseball club is an original member of the National League (1876 to date), established in 1874 or 1870. Here is a list of players who appeared in at least one regular season game beginning 1874.

(Their 1870–1871 players are in Category:Chicago White Stockings players among many others to about 1890.)

Bold identifies members of the National Baseball Hall of Fame.

Italics identify players with uniform numbers retired by the team.

== A ==
- David Aardsma, P, 2006
- Bert Abbey, P, 1893–1894, 1895
- Cory Abbott, P, 2021
- Ted Abernathy, P, 1965, 1966, 1969–1970
- Cliff Aberson, OF, 1947–1949
- Johnny Abrego, P, 1985
- Jimmy Adair, SS, 1931
- Jason Adam, P, 2020–2021
- Karl Adams, P, 1915
- Red Adams, P, 1946
- Terry Adams, P, 1995–1999
- Sparky Adams, 2B, 1922–1927
- Bobby Adams, 3B, 1957–1959
- Mike Adams, OF, 1976–1977
- Bob Addis, OF, 1952–1953
- Bob Addy, OF, 1876
- Dewey Adkins, P, 1949
- Jim Adduci, IF, 2019
- Rick Aguilera, P, 1999–2001
- Hank Aguirre, P, 1969–1970
- Jack Aker, P, 1972, 1973
- Arismendy Alcántara, 2B, 2014—2015
- Kevin Alcántara, OF, 2024–Present
- Sergio Alcántara, SS, 2021
- Dale Alderson, P, 1943–1944
- Vic Aldridge, P, 1917–1924
- Grover Alexander, P, 1918–1926
- Manny Alexander, SS, 1997–1999
- Matt Alexander, OF, 1973–1974
- Antonio Alfonseca, P, 2002–2003
- Nick Allen, C, 1916
- Ethan Allen, OF, 1936
- Milo Allison, OF, 1913–1914
- Moisés Alou, OF, 2002–2004
- Yency Almonte, P, 2024
- Albert Almora, OF, 2016–2020
- Porfi Altamirano, P, 1984
- George Altman, OF, 1959–1962, 1965–1967
- Adbert Alzolay, P, 2019–2024
- Joey Amalfitano, 2B, 1964–1967
- Miguel Amaya, C, 2023–Present
- Vicente Amor, P, 1955
- Bob Anderson, P, 1957–1962
- Brett Anderson, P, 2017
- Jimmy Anderson, P, 2004
- John André, P, 1955
- Shane Andrews, 3B, 1999–2000
- Jim Andrews, OF, 1890
- Fred Andrus, OF, 1876–1884
- Tom Angley, C, 1929
- Cap Anson, 1B, 1876–1897
- Jimmy Archer, C, 1909–1917
- José Arcia, SS, 1968
- Alex Arias, SS, 1992
- Shawn Armstrong, P, 2024
- Jamie Arnold, P, 2000
- Jake Arrieta, P, 2013–2017, 2021
- Jim Asbell, OF, 1938
- José Ascanio, P, 2008–09
- Jairo Asencio, P, 2012
- Richie Ashburn, OF, 1960–1961
- Ken Aspromonte, 2B, 1963
- Javier Assad, P, 2022–Present
- Paul Assenmacher, P, 1989–1993
- Mitch Atkins, P, 2009-2010
- Toby Atwell, C, 1952–1953
- Earl Averill Jr., C, 1959, 1960
- Alex Avila, C, 2017
- Bobby Ayala, P, 1999–2000
- Manny Aybar, P, 2001

== B ==
- Fred Baczewski, P, 1953
- Ed Baecht, P, 1931–1932
- Javier Báez, IF, 2014–2021
- Ed Bailey, C, 1965
- Sweetbread Bailey, P, 1919–1920, 1921
- Gene Baker, 2B, 1953–1957
- Jeff Baker, IF-OF, 2009–12
- John Baker, C, 2014
- Scott Baker, P, 2013
- Tom Baker, P, 1963
- Paul Bako, C, 2003–2004
- Mark Baldwin, P, 1887–1888
- Jay Baller, P, 1985–1987
- Moisés Ballesteros, C/DH, 2025–Present
- Tony Balsamo, P, 1962
- Ernie Banks, SS-1B, 1953–1971
- Willie Banks, P, 1993–1995
- Steve Barber, P, 1970
- Turner Barber, OF, 1917–1922
- Bret Barberie, 2B, 1996
- Richard Barker, P, 1999–2000
- Ross Barnes, 2B, 1876–1877
- Tony Barnette, P, 2019
- Darwin Barney, 2B, 2010–14
- Tucker Barnhart, C, 2023
- Cuno Barragan, C, 1961–1963
- Bob Barrett, 3B, 1923–1925
- Dick Barrett, P, 1943
- Michael Barrett, C, 2004–2007
- Shad Barry, OF, 1904, 1905
- Dick Bartell, SS, 1939
- Vince Barton, OF, 1931–1932
- Cliff Bartosh, P, 2005
- Anthony Bass, P, 2018
- Charlie Bastian, SS, 1889
- Johnny Bates, OF, 1914
- Miguel Batista, P, 1996–1997
- Allen Battle, OF, 1998–1999
- Russ Bauers, P, 1946
- Frank Baumann, P, 1965
- Frank Baumholtz, OF, 1949, 1951–1955
- José Bautista, P, 1993–1994
- Mike Baxter, OF, 2015
- Tommy Beals, OF, 1880
- Dave Beard, P, 1985
- Ginger Beaumont, OF, 1910
- Rod Beck, P, 1998–1999
- Clyde Beck, 3B, 1926–1930
- Heinz Becker, 1B, 1943–1946
- Glenn Beckert, 2B, 1965–1973
- Fred Beebe, P, 1906
- Dallas Beeler, P, 2014–2015
- Jeff Beliveau, P, 2012
- George Bell, OF, 1991
- Les Bell, 3B, 1930–1931
- Mark Bellhorn, 2B, 2002–2003
- Cody Bellinger, OF, 2023-2024
- Francis Beltrán, P, 2002, 2004
- Alan Benes, P, 2002–2003
- Butch Benton, C, 1982
- Jason Bere, P, 2001–2002
- Justin Berg, P, 2009–11
- Jason Berken, P, 2012Vidal Bruján
- Joe Berry, P, 1942
- Quintin Berry, OF, 2015
- Damon Berryhill, C, 1987–1990, 1991
- Dick Bertell, C, 1960–1965, 1967
- Jon Berti, UT, 2025
- Christian Bethancourt, C, 2024
- Joe Biagini, P, 2021
- Oscar Bielaski, OF, 1875, 1876
- Mike Bielecki, P, 1988–1990, 1991
- Hunter Bigge, P, 2024
- Larry Biittner, OF, 1976, 1977–1980
- Steve Bilko, 1B, 1954
- Doug Bird, P, 1981, 1982
- Bill Bishop, P, 1889
- Hi Bithorn, P, 1942–1946
- Earl Blackburn, C, 1917
- Tim Blackwell, C, 1978–1981
- Rick Bladt, OF, 1969
- Footsie Blair, 2B, 1929–1931
- Sheriff Blake, P, 1924–1931
- Andrés Blanco, 2B-SS, 2009
- Henry Blanco, C, 2005–2008
- Kevin Blankenship, P, 1988–1990
- Jeff Blauser, SS, 1998–2000
- Cy Block, 3B, 1942–1946
- Randy Bobb, C, 1968–1969
- John Boccabella, C, 1963–1968
- Brian Bogusevic, OF, 2013
- Jim Bolger, OF, 1955–1958
- Bobby Bonds, OF, 1981
- Julio Bonetti, P, 1940
- Bill Bonham, P, 1971–1977
- Emilio Bonifacio, IF/OF, 2014
- Zeke Bonura, 1B, 1940
- Julio Borbon, OF, 2013
- George Borchers, P, 1888
- Rich Bordi, P, 1983–1984
- Bob Borkowski, OF, 1950–1951
- Steve Boros, 3B, 1963
- Joe Borowski, P, 2001–2005
- Hank Borowy, P, 1945, 1946–1948
- J. C. Boscán, C, 2013
- Shawn Boskie, P, 1990–1994
- Thad Bosley, OF, 1983–1986
- David Bote, IF, 2018–2022, 2024
- Derek Botelho, P, 1985
- John Bottarini, C, 1937
- Kent Bottenfield, P, 1996–1997
- Ed Bouchee, 1B, 1960, 1961
- Pat Bourque, 1B, 1971–1973
- Larry Bowa, SS, 1982–1985
- Michael Bowden, P, 2012–2013
- Rob Bowen, C, 2007
- Micah Bowie, P, 1999
- Bob Bowman, P, 1942
- Bill Bowman, C, 1891
- Matthew Boyd, P, 2025–Present
- Brad Boxberger, P, 2023
- Brad Brach, P, 2019
- George Bradley, P, 1877
- Bill Bradley, 3B, 1899–1900
- Milton Bradley, OF, 2009
- Spike Brady, OF, 1875
- Mike Brannock, 3B, 1875
- Kitty Bransfield, 1B, 1911
- Ryan Brasier, P, 2025
- Steven Brault, P, 2022
- Danny Breeden, C, 1971
- Hal Breeden, 1B, 1971
- Alex Bregman, 3B, 2026-Present
- William Brennan, P, 1993
- Roger Bresnahan, C, 1900, 1913–1915
- Herb Brett, P, 1924–1925
- Colten Brewer, P, 2024
- Jim Brewer, P, 1960–1963
- Charlie Brewster, SS, 1944
- Al Bridwell, SS, 1913
- Buttons Briggs, P, 1896–1905
- John Briggs, P, 1956–1958
- Dan Briggs, 1B, 1982
- Harry Bright, 1B, 1965
- Jim Brillheart, P, 1927
- Leon Brinkopf, SS, 1952
- Pete Broberg, P, 1977
- Lou Brock, OF, 1961–1964
- Tarrik Brock, OF, 1999–2000
- Ernie Broglio, P, 1964, 1965–1966
- Herman Bronkie, 3B, 1914
- Mandy Brooks, OF, 1925–1926
- Jim Brosnan, P, 1954–1958
- Rex Brothers. P, 2020–2021
- Ben Brown, P, 2024–Present
- Brant Brown, OF, 1996–1998, 2000
- Joe Brown, P, 1884
- Jophery Brown, P, 1968
- Jumbo Brown, P, 1925
- Lew Brown, C, 1879
- Mordecai Brown, P, 1904–1912, 1916
- Ray Brown, P, 1909
- Roosevelt Brown, OF, 1999–2002
- Tommy Brown, SS, 1952, 1953
- Byron Browne, OF, 1965–1967
- George Browne, OF, 1909
- Vidal Brujan, SS, 2025
- Mike Brumley, SS, 1987
- Warren Brusstar, P, 1983–1985
- Clay Bryant, P, 1935–1940
- Don Bryant, C, 1966
- Kris Bryant, 3B, 2015–2021
- Tod Brynan, P, 1888
- Bill Buckner, 1B, 1977–1984
- Jake Buchanan, P, 2016-2017
- Steve Buechele, 3B, 1992, 1993–1995
- Art Bues, 3B, 1914
- Damon Buford, OF, 1999–2001
- Bob Buhl, P, 1962, 1963–1966
- Scott Bullett, OF, 1995–1996
- Jim Bullinger, P, 1992–1996
- Freddie Burdette, P, 1962–1964
- Lew Burdette, P, 1964, 1965
- Nick Burdi, P, 2023
- Smoky Burgess, C, 1949–1951
- Leo Burke, OF, 1963, 1964–1965
- Alex Burnett, P, 2013
- Jeromy Burnitz, OF, 2005
- Tom Burns, 3B, 1880–1891
- Ray Burris, P, 1973–1979
- John Burrows, P, 1943, 1944
- Ellis Burton, OF, 1963, 1964–1965
- Dick Burwell, P, 1960–1961
- Michael Busch, IF, 2024–Present
- Guy Bush, P, 1923–1934
- Eddie Butler, P, 2017-2018
- Johnny Butler, SS, 1928
- John Buzhardt, P, 1958–1959
- Freddie Bynum, 2B/OF, 2006
- Marlon Byrd, OF, 2010–12

== C ==
- Alberto Cabrera, P, 2012–2013
- Génesis Cabrera, P, 2025
- Miguel Cairo, 2B, 1997, 2001
- Owen Caissie, OF, 2025
- Marty Callaghan, OF, 1922–23
- Nixey Callahan, OF, 1897–1900
- Johnny Callison, OF, 1970–71
- Dick Calmus, P, 1967
- Dolph Camilli, 1B, 1933–1934
- Kid Camp, P, 1894
- Lew Camp, 3B, 1893–94
- Shawn Camp, P, 2012–2013
- Tony Campana, OF, 2011–12
- Bill Campbell, P, 1982–1983
- Joe Campbell, OF, 1967
- Gilly Campbell, C, 1933
- Mike Campbell, P, 1996
- Ron Campbell, 2B, 1964–1966
- Vin Campbell, OF, 1908
- Alexander Canario, OF, 2023–2024
- Jim Canavan, OF, 1892
- Jeimer Candelario, 3B, 2016-2017, 2023
- Chris Cannizzaro, C, 1971
- Mike Capel, P, 1988
- Doug Capilla, P, 1979, 1980–1981
- José Cardenal, OF, 1972–1977
- Adrian Cardenas, 2B, 2012
- Don Cardwell, P, 1960, 1961–1962
- Tex Carleton, P, 1935–1938
- Esmailin Caridad, P, 2009-2010
- Victor Caratini, C, 2017–2020
- Don Carlsen, P, 1948
- Hal Carlson, P, 1927, 1928–1930
- Bill Carney, OF, 1904
- Bob Carpenter, P, 1947
- Chris Carpenter, P, 2011
- Cliff Carroll, OF, 1890–1891
- Al Carson, P, 1910
- Paul Carter, P, 1916–1920
- Joe Carter, OF, 1983
- Rico Carty, OF, 1973
- Bob Caruthers, OF, 1893
- Hugh Casey, P, 1935
- Doc Casey, 3B, 1903–1905
- Andrew Cashner, P, 2010–11
- Larry Casian, P, 1995–1997
- John Cassidy, OF, 1878
- Nicholas Castellanos, OF, 2019
- Erick Castillo, C, 2021
- Frank Castillo, P, 1991–1997
- Lendy Castillo, P, 2012
- Welington Castillo, C, 2010–2015
- Kervin Castro, P, 2022
- Starlin Castro, SS, 2010–2015
- Willi Castro, OF, 2025
- Bill Caudill, P, 1979–1981
- Phil Cavarretta, 1B, 1934–1953
- Art Ceccarelli, P, 1959–1960
- Ronny Cedeño, SS, 2005–2007
- Xavier Cedeño, P, 2019
- Ron Cey, 3B, 1983–1986
- Andrew Chafin, P, 2020–2021
- Cliff Chambers, P, 1948
- Frank Chance, 1B, 1898–1912
- Lim Chang-yong, P, 2013
- Aroldis Chapman, P, 2016
- Harry Chapman, C, 1912
- Jaye Chapman, P, 2012
- Tyler Chatwood, P, 2018–2020
- Jesse Chavez, P, 2018, 2022
- Virgil Cheeves, P, 1920–1923
- Larry Cheney, P, 1911–1914, 1915
- Rocky Cherry, P, 2007
- Scott Chiasson, P, 2001–2002
- Cupid Childs, 2B, 1900–1901
- Pete Childs, 2B, 1901
- Bob Chipman, P, 1944–1949
- Robinson Chirinos, C, 2021
- Harry Chiti, C, 1950–1956
- Hee-Seop Choi, 1B, 2002–2003
- Steve Christmas, C, 1986
- Loyd Christopher, OF, 1945
- Bubba Church, P, 1953, 1954–1955
- Len Church, P, 1966
- John Churry, C, 1924–1927
- Steve Cishek, P, 2018-2019
- Aaron Civale, P, 2025
- Mark Clark, P, 1997, 1998
- Dad Clark, 1B, 1902
- Dave Clark, OF, 1990, 1997
- Dad Clarke, P, 1888
- Henry Clarke, P, 1898
- Tommy Clarke, C, 1918
- Sumpter Clarke, OF, 1920
- John Clarkson, P, 1884–1887
- Fritz Clausen, P, 1893, 1894
- Clem Clemens, C, 1916
- Doug Clemens, OF, 1964, 1965
- Matt Clement, P, 2002–2004
- Steve Clevenger, C, 2011–2013
- Ty Cline, OF, 1966
- Gene Clines, OF, 1977–1979
- Billy Clingman, 3B, 1900
- Otis Clymer, OF, 1913
- Andy Coakley, P, 1908, 1909
- Buck Coats, OF, 2006–2007
- Kevin Coffman, P, 1990
- Dick Cogan, P, 1899
- Frank Coggins, 2B, 1972
- Chris Coghlan, OF, 2014–2015, 2016
- Hy Cohen, P, 1955
- Phil Coke, P, 2015
- Jim Colborn, P, 1969–1971
- King Cole, P, 1909–1912
- Dave Cole, P, 1954
- Casey Coleman, P, 2010–12
- Joe Coleman, P, 1976
- Bill Collins, OF, 1911
- Dan Collins, OF, 1874
- Phil Collins, P, 1923
- Rip Collins, C, 1940
- Ripper Collins, 1B, 1937–1938
- Tim Collins, P, 2019
- Jackie Collum, P, 1957
- Tyler Colvin, OF, 2009–11
- Jorge Comellas, P, 1945
- Clint Compton, P, 1972
- Gerardo Concepción, P, 2016
- Michael Conforto, OF, 2026-Present
- Bunk Congalton, OF, 1902
- Fritzie Connally, 3B, 1983
- Terry Connell, C, 1874
- Jim Connor, 2B, 1892–1899
- Bill Connors, P, 1966
- Chuck Connors, 1B, 1951
- Willson Contreras, C, 2016–2022
- Jim Cook, OF, 1903
- Ron Coomer, 1B, 2001
- Jimmy Cooney, SS, 1890–1892
- Jimmy Cooney, SS, 1926–1927
- Garrett Cooper, 1B, 2024
- Mort Cooper, P, 1949
- Walker Cooper, C, 1954, 1955
- Wilbur Cooper, P, 1925–1926
- Larry Corcoran, P, 1880–1885
- Mike Corcoran, P, 1884
- Manny Corpas, P, 2012
- Red Corriden, SS, 1913–1915
- Frank Corridon, P, 1904
- Tom Cosgrove, P, 2025
- Jim Cosman, P, 1970
- Dick Cotter, C, 1912
- Hooks Cotter, 1B, 1922–1924
- Henry Cotto, OF, 1984
- Ensign Cottrell, P, 1912
- Neal Cotts, P, 2007–2009
- Roscoe Coughlin, P, 1890
- Wes Covington, OF, 1966
- Billy Cowan, OF, 1963–1964
- Larry Cox, C, 1978, 1982
- Doug Creek, P, 1999
- Chuck Crim, P, 1994
- Harry Croft, OF, 1901
- Narciso Crook, OF, 2022
- George Crosby, P, 1884
- Ken Crosby, P, 1975–1976
- Jeff Cross, SS, 1948
- Pete Crow-Armstrong, OF, 2023–Present
- Héctor Cruz, OF, 1978, 1981–1982
- Juan Cruz, P, 2001–2003
- José Cuas, P, 2023–2024
- Dick Culler, SS, 1948
- Ray Culp, P, 1967
- Will Cunnane, P, 2001–2002
- Bert Cunningham, P, 1900–1901
- Doc Curley, 2B, 1899
- Clarence Currie, P, 1903
- Cliff Curtis, P, 1911
- Jack Curtis, P, 1961–1962
- Jack Cusick, SS, 1951
- Ned Cuthbert, OF, 1874
- Kiki Cuyler, OF, 1928–1935
- Mike Cvengros, P, 1929

== D ==
- Bill Dahlen, SS, 1891–1898
- Babe Dahlgren, 1B, 1941, 1942
- Con Daily, C, 1896
- Dom Dallessandro, OF, 1940–1947
- Abner Dalrymple, OF, 1879–1886
- Tom Daly, C, 1918–1921
- Tom Daly, 2B, 1887–1888
- Kal Daniels, OF, 1992
- Alvin Dark, SS, 1958, 1959
- Dell Darling, C, 1649–1889
- Yu Darvish, P, 2018–present
- Bobby Darwin, OF, 1977
- Doug Dascenzo, OF, 1988–1992
- Bill Davidson, OF, 1909
- Zach Davies, P, 2021
- Brock Davis, OF, 1970–1971
- Curt Davis, P, 1936, 1937
- Doug Davis, P, 2011
- Jody Davis, C, 1981–1987, 1988
- Jim Davis, P, 1954–1956
- Ron Davis, P, 1986, 1987
- Steve Davis, 2B, 1979
- Taylor Davis, C, 2017
- Tommy Davis, OF, 1970, 1972
- Wade Davis, P, 2017
- Andre Dawson, OF, 1987–1992
- Boots Day, OF, 1970
- Brian Dayett, OF, 1985–1987
- Jorge De La Rosa, P, 2018
- Greg Deichmann, OF, 2021
- Iván DeJesús, SS, 1977–1981
- Mark DeRosa, 2B/3B/OF, 2007–2008
- Delino DeShields, 2B, 2001–2002
- Charlie Deal, 3B, 1916, 1917–1921
- Wayland Dean, P, 1927
- Dizzy Dean, P, 1938–1941
- George Decker, OF, 1892–1897
- Joe Decker, P, 1969–1972
- David DeJesus, OF, 2012–2013
- Jim Delahanty, 2B, 1901
- Bobby Del Greco, OF, 1957
- Fred Demarais, P, 1890
- Al Demaree, P, 1917
- Frank Demaree, OF, 1932–1938
- Harry DeMiller, P, 1892
- Gene DeMontreville, 2B, 1899
- Ryan Dempster, P, 2004–12
- Chris Denorfia, OF, 2015
- Roger Denzer, P, 1897
- Matt Dermody, P, 2020, 2022
- Bob Dernier, OF, 1984–1987
- Claud Derrick, SS, 1914
- Paul Derringer, P, 1943–1945
- Daniel Descalso, IF, OF, 2019
- Tom Dettore, P, 1974–1976
- Jim Devlin, P, 1874–1875
- Blake DeWitt, 2B, 2010–12
- Charlie Dexter, OF, 1900–1901, 1902
- Thomas Diamond, P, 2010
- Mike DiFelice, C, 2004
- Frank DiPino, P, 1986, 1987–1988
- Mike Diaz, 1B, 1983
- Lance Dickson, P, 1990
- Steve Dillard, 2B, 1979–1981
- Pickles Dillhoefer, C, 1917
- Miguel Diloné, OF, 1979
- Alec Distaso, P, 1969
- John Dobbs, OF, 1902, 1903
- Jess Dobernic, P, 1948–1949
- Cozy Dolan, OF, 1900, 1901
- John Dolan, P, 1895
- Tom Dolan, C, 1879
- Rafael Dolis, P, 2011–2013
- Tim Donahue, C, 1895–1900
- Frank Donnelly, P, 1893
- Ed Donnelly, P, 1959
- Mickey Doolan, SS, 1916
- Brian Dorsett, C, 1996
- Jack Doscher, P, 1903
- Herm Doscher, 3B, 1879
- Felix Doubront, P, 2014
- Phil Douglas, P, 1915, 1917–1919
- Taylor Douthit, OF, 1933
- Dave Dowling, P, 1966
- Tom Downey, SS, 1912
- Scott Downs, P, 2000
- Red Downs, 2B, 1912
- Jack Doyle, 1B, 1901
- Larry Doyle, 2B, 1916, 1917
- Jim Doyle, 3B, 1911
- Moe Drabowsky, P, 1956–1960
- Sammy Drake, 2B, 1960–1961
- Solly Drake, OF, 1956
- Paddy Driscoll, infield, 1917
- Dick Drott, P, 1957–1961
- Monk Dubiel, P, 1949–1952
- Jason Dubois, OF, 2004–2005
- Brian Duensing, P, 2017-2018
- Tyler Duffey, P, 2023
- Hugh Duffy, OF, 1888–1889
- Matt Duffy, 3B, 2021
- Nick Dumovich, P, 1923
- Courtney Duncan, P, 2001–2002
- Jim Dunegan, P, 1970
- Sam Dungan, OF, 1892–1894, 1900
- Ron Dunn, 2B, 1974–1975
- Shawon Dunston, SS, 1985–1995, 1997
- Todd Dunwoody, OF, 2001
- Blaine Durbin, OF, 1907–1908
- Leon Durham, 1B, 1981–1988
- Frank Dwyer, P, 1888–1889

== E ==
- Don Eaddy, 3B, 1959
- Bill Eagan, 2B, 1893
- Howard Earl, OF, 1890
- Arnold Earley, P, 1966
- Mal Eason, P, 1900–1902
- Roy Easterwood, C, 1944
- Rawly Eastwick, P, 1981
- Vallie Eaves, P, 1941–1942
- Angel Echevarria, OF, 2002
- Dennis Eckersley, P, 1984–1986
- Charlie Eden, OF, 1877
- Tom Edens, P, 1995
- Jim Edmonds, OF, 2008
- Bruce Edwards, C, 1951–1954
- Carl Edwards Jr., P, 2016-2019
- Hank Edwards, OF, 1949, 1950
- Scott Effross, P, 2021–2022
- Dave Eggler, OF, 1877
- Ed Eiteljorge, P, 1890
- Lee Elia, SS, 1968
- Pete Elko, 3B, 1943–1944
- Rowdy Elliott, C, 1916–1918
- Allen Elliott, 1B, 1923–1924
- Carter Elliott, SS, 1921
- Jim Ellis, P, 1967
- Dick Ellsworth, P, 1958–1966
- Don Elston, P, 1953, 1957–1964
- Mario Encarnación, OF, 2002
- Steve Engel, P, 1985
- Woody English, SS, 1927–1936
- Al Epperly, P, 1938
- Paul Erickson, P, 1941–1948
- Frank Ernaga, OF, 1957–1958
- Dick Errickson, P, 1942
- Anderson Espinoza, P, 2022
- Shawn Estes, P, 2003
- Chuck Estrada, P, 1966
- Jeremiah Estrada, P, 2022–2023
- Uel Eubanks, P, 1922
- Bill Everitt, 1B, 1895–1900
- Johnny Evers, 2B, 1902–1913
- Scott Eyre, P, 2006–2008

== F ==
- Jim Fanning, C, 1954–1957
- Carmen Fanzone, 3B, 1971–1974
- Johneshwy Fargas, OF, 2021
- Kyle Farnsworth, P, 1999–2004
- Duke Farrell, C, 1888–1889
- Doc Farrell, SS, 1930
- Luke Farrell, P, 2018, 2022
- Jeff Fassero, P, 2001–2002
- Darcy Fast, P, 1968
- Bill Faul, P, 1965–1966
- Vern Fear, P, 1952
- Marv Felderman, C, 1942
- Scott Feldman, P, 2013
- John Felske, C, 1968
- Charlie Ferguson, P, 1901
- Bob Ferguson, 3B, 1878
- Félix Fermín, SS, 1996
- Frank Fernández, C, 1971, 1972
- Jesús Figueroa, OF, 1980
- Tom Filer, P, 1982
- William Fischer, C, 1916
- Bob Fisher, SS, 1914–1915
- Howie Fitzgerald, OF, 1922–1924
- Max Flack, OF, 1916–1922
- John Flavin, P, 1964
- Bill Fleming, P, 1942–1946
- Scott Fletcher, SS, 1981–1982
- Chris Flexen, P, 2025
- Silver Flint, C, 1879–1889
- Jesse Flores, P, 1942
- Dylan Floro, P, 2017
- Cliff Floyd, OF, 2007
- John Fluhrer, OF, 1915
- Jocko Flynn, P, 1886–1887
- George Flynn, OF, 1896
- Gene Fodge, P, 1958
- Will Foley, 3B, 1875
- Dee Fondy, 1B, 1951–1957
- Ray Fontenot, P, 1985–1986
- Mike Fontenot, IF, 2005–2010
- Barry Foote, C, 1979–1981
- Davy Force, SS, 1874
- Tony Fossas, P, 1998
- Kevin Foster, P, 1994–1998
- Elmer Foster, OF, 1890–1891
- Dexter Fowler, OF, 2015–2016
- Chad Fox, P, 2005, 2008-2009
- Jake Fox, OF, 2007, 2009
- Bill Foxen, P, 1910, 1911
- Jimmie Foxx, 1B, 1942–1944
- Ken Frailing, P, 1974–1976
- Ossie France, P, 1890
- Matt Franco, 1B, 1995
- Terry Francona, 1B, 1986
- Seth Frankoff, P, 2017
- Chick Fraser, P, 1907–1909
- Clint Frazier, OF, 2022
- George Frazier, P, 1984–1986
- Ryan Freel, 3B-OF, 2009
- Buck Freeman, P, 1921–1922
- Hersh Freeman, P, 1958
- Mark Freeman, P, 1960
- Mike Freeman (baseball), IF, 2017
- George Freese, 3B, 1961
- Howard Freigau, 3B, 1925–1927
- Larry French, P, 1935–1941
- Lonny Frey, 2B, 1937, 1947
- Bernie Friberg, 3B, 1919–1925
- Danny Friend, P, 1895–1898
- Owen Friend, 2B, 1955–1956
- Woodie Fryman, P, 1978
- Oscar Fuhr, P, 1921
- Kyuji Fujikawa, P, 2013-2014
- Kosuke Fukudome, OF, 2008–11
- Sam Fuld, OF, 2007, 2009-2010
- Michael Fulmer, P, 2023, 2025
- Fred Fussell, P, 1922–1923
- Mike Fyhrie, P, 2001

== G ==
- Gabe Gabler, 1958
- Len Gabrielson, OF, 1964, 1965
- Gary Gaetti, 3B, 1998–1999
- Phil Gagliano, 2B, 1970
- Steve Gajkowski, P, 1998–1999
- Augie Galan, OF, 1934–1941
- Sean Gallagher, P, 2007–2008
- Oscar Gamble, OF, 1969
- Bill Gannon, OF, 1901
- John Ganzel, 1B, 1900
- Joe Garagiola, C, 1953, 1954
- Bob Garbark, C, 1937–1939
- Rich Garcés, P, 1995
- Jaime Garcia, P, 2018
- Robel Garcia, IF, 2019
- Nomar Garciaparra, SS, 2004–2005
- Jim Gardner, P, 1902
- Rob Gardner, P, 1967
- Daniel Garibay, P, 2000
- Mike Garman, P, 1976
- Adrian Garrett, DH, 1970, 1973–1975
- Cecil Garriott, 1946
- Ned Garvin, P, 1899–1900
- Matt Garza, P, 2011–2013
- Charlie Gassaway, P, 1944
- Ed Gastfield, C, 1885
- Joey Gathright, OF, 2009
- John Gaub, P, 2011
- Chad Gaudin, P, 2008
- Chippy Gaw, P, 1920
- Dave Geisel, P, 1978–1981
- Emil Geiss, P, 1887
- Greek George, C, 1941
- Dave Gerard, P, 1962
- George Gerberman, P, 1962
- Justin Germano, P, 2012
- Gonzalez Germen, P, 2015
- Dick Gernert, 1B, 1960
- Jody Gerut, OF, 2005
- Doc Gessler, OF, 1906
- Trent Giambrone, IF, 2021
- Robert Gibson, P, 1890
- Norm Gigon, 2B, 1967
- Charlie Gilbert, OF, 1941–1946
- Johnny Gill, OF, 1935–1936
- Cole Gillespie, OF, 2013
- Paul Gillespie, C, 1942–1945
- Henry Gilroy, C, 1874
- Joe Girardi, C, 1989–1992, 2000–2002
- Dave Giusti, P, 1977
- Mychal Givens, P, 2022
- Fred Glade, P, 1902
- Doug Glanville, OF, 1996–1997, 2003
- Jim Gleeson, OF, 1939–1940
- Bob Glenalvin, 2B, 1890–1893
- Ed Glenn, SS, 1902
- John Glenn, OF, 1874–1877
- Ross Gload, 1B, 2000
- Al Glossop, 2B, 1946
- John Goetz, P, 1960
- Mike Golden, OF, 1875
- Fred Goldsmith, P, 1880–1884
- Walt Golvin, 1B, 1922
- Yan Gomes, C, 2022–2024
- Leo Gómez, 3B, 1996
- Alberto González, IF, 2013
- Carlos González, OF, 2019
- Geremi González, P, 1997–1998
- Mike González, C, 1925–1929
- Alex S. Gonzalez, SS, 2002–2004
- Luis Gonzalez, OF, 1995–1996
- Raúl González, OF, 2000
- Wilbur Good, OF, 1911–1915
- Ival Goodman, OF, 1943–1944
- Curtis Goodwin, OF, 1999
- Tom Goodwin, OF, 2003–2004
- Tom Gordon, P, 2000–2002
- Mike Gordon, C, 1977–1978
- George Gore, OF, 1879–1886
- Terrance Gore, OF, 2018
- Hank Gornicki, P, 1941
- Johnny Goryl, 2B, 1957–1959
- Tom Gorzelanny, P, 2009-2010
- Rich Gossage, P, 1988
- Billy Grabarkewitz, 3B, 1974
- John Grabow, P, 2009–11
- Earl Grace, C, 1929–1931
- Mark Grace, 1B, 1988–2000
- Peaches Graham, C, 1903, 1911
- Alex Grammas, SS, 1962, 1963
- Hank Grampp, P, 1927–1929
- Tom Grant, OF, 1983
- George Grantham, 2B, 1922–1924
- Joe Graves, 3B, 1926
- Jeff Gray, P, 2010
- Danny Green, OF, 1898–1901
- Adam Greenberg, OF, 2005
- Shane Greene, P, 2023
- Willie Greene, 3B, 2000
- Kevin Gregg, P, 2009, 2013
- Lee Gregory, P, 1964
- Ben Grieve, OF, 2004–2005
- Hank Griffin, P, 1911
- Mike Griffin, P, 1981
- Frank Griffith, P, 1892
- Clark Griffith, P, 1893–1900
- Tommy Griffith, OF, 1925
- Denver Grigsby, OF, 1923–1925
- Burleigh Grimes, P, 1932–1933
- Ray Grimes, 1B, 1921–1924
- Charlie Grimm, 1B, 1925–1936
- Justin Grimm, P, 2013–2017
- Greg Gross, OF, 1977–1978
- Ernie Groth, P, 1904
- Mark Grudzielanek, 2B, 2003–2004
- Robert Gsellman, P, 2022
- Marv Gudat, OF, 1932
- Matt Guerrier, P, 2013
- Ad Gumbert, P, 1888–1889, 1891–1892
- Dave Gumpert, P, 1985–1986
- Larry Gura, P, 1970–1973, 1985
- Taylor Gushue, C, 2021
- Frankie Gustine, 2B, 1949
- Charlie Guth, P, 1880
- Mark Guthrie, P, 1999–2000, 2003
- Ricky Gutiérrez, SS, 2000–2001
- José Guzmán, P, 1993–1994
- Ángel Guzmán, P, 2006-2009

== H ==
- Eddie Haas, OF, 1957
- Stan Hack, 3B, 1932–1947
- Warren Hacker, P, 1948–1956
- Casey Hageman, P, 1914
- Rip Hagerman, P, 1909
- Johnny Hairston, C, 1969
- Jerry Hairston Jr., 2B, 2005–2006
- Scott Hairston, OF, 2013
- Drew Hall, P, 1986–1988
- Jimmie Hall, OF, 1969, 1970
- Mel Hall, OF, 1981–1984
- Jimmy Hallinan, SS, 1877, 1878
- Cole Hamels, P, 2018-2019
- Billy Hamilton, OF, 2020
- Steve Hamilton, P, 1972
- Jason Hammel, P, 2014, 2015-2016
- Ralph Hamner, P, 1947–1949
- Justin Hancock, P, 2018
- Bill Hands, P, 1966–1972
- Chris Haney, P, 1998
- Todd Haney, 2B, 1994–1996
- Fred Haney, 3B, 1927
- Frank Hankinson, 3B, 1878–1879
- Bill Hanlon, 1B, 1903
- Dave Hansen, 3B, 1997
- Ollie Hanson, P, 1921
- Ed Hanyzewski, P, 1942–1946
- Ian Happ, OF, 2017–present
- Bill Harbridge, OF, 1878–1879
- Rich Harden, P, 2008–2009
- Lou Hardie, C, 1886
- Bud Hardin, SS, 1952
- Jason Hardtke, 2B, 1998
- Alex Hardy, P, 1902–1903
- Jack Hardy, C, 1907
- Dan Haren, P, 2015
- Alan Hargesheimer, P, 1983
- Bubbles Hargrave, C, 1913–1915
- Mike Harkey, P, 1988–1993
- Dick Harley, OF, 1903
- Jack Harper, P, 1906
- Ray Harrell, P, 1939
- Vic Harris, 2B, 1974–1975
- Brendan Harris, 2B, 2004
- Lenny Harris, 3B, 2003
- Kevin Hart, P, 2007-2009
- Chuck Hartenstein, P, 1965–1968
- Gabby Hartnett, C, 1922–1940
- Topsy Hartsel, OF, 1901
- Jeff Hartsock, P, 1992
- Zaza Harvey, OF, 1900
- Ron Hassey, C, 1984
- Scott Hastings, C, 1875
- Billy Hatcher, OF, 1984–1985
- Joe Hatten, P, 1951–1952
- Grady Hatton, 3B, 1960
- LaTroy Hawkins, P, 2004–2005
- Jack Hayden, OF, 1908
- Bill Hayes, C, 1980–1981
- John Healy, P, 1889
- Bill Heath, C, 1969
- Cliff Heathcote, OF, 1922–1930
- Mike Heathcott, P, 1999–2000
- Richie Hebner, 3B, 1984–1985
- Mike Hechinger, C, 1912, 1913
- Jim Hegan, C, 1960
- Aaron Heilman, P, 2009
- Al Heist, OF, 1960–1961
- Rollie Hemsley, C, 1931, 1932
- Ken Henderson, OF, 1979, 1980
- Steve Henderson, OF, 1981–1982
- Bob Hendley, P, 1965–1967
- Harvey Hendrick, 1B, 1933
- Ellie Hendricks, C, 1972
- Jack Hendricks, OF, 1902
- Kyle Hendricks, 2014–2024
- Claude Hendrix, P, 1916–1920
- George Hennessey, P, 1945
- Bill Henry, P, 1958–1959
- Roy Henshaw, P, 1933–1936
- Félix Heredia, P, 1998–2001
- Billy Herman, 2B, 1931–1941
- Babe Herman, OF, 1933–1934
- Chad Hermansen, OF, 2002
- Gene Hermanski, OF, 1951–1953
- Michael Hermosillo, OF, 2021–2022
- Chico Hernández, C, 1942–1943
- José Hernández, SS, 1994–1999, 2003
- Ramón Hernández, P, 1968, 1976–1977
- Willie Hernández, P, 1977–1983
- Tom Hernon, OF, 1897
- Leroy Herrmann, P, 1932–1933
- John Herrnstein, OF, 1966
- Jonathan Herrera, 2B, 2014-2015
- Jason Heyward, OF, 2016–2022
- Buck Herzog, 2B, 1919–1920
- Codi Heuer, P, 2021
- Jack Hiatt, C, 1970
- John Hibbard, P, 1884
- Greg Hibbard, P, 1993
- Bryan Hickerson, P, 1995
- Eddie Hickey, 3B, 1901
- Jim Hickman, OF, 1968–1973
- Kirby Higbe, P, 1937–1939
- Irv Higginbotham, P, 1909
- P. J. Higgins, C, 2021–2022
- Dick Higham, OF, 1875
- R.E. Hillebrand, OF, 1902
- Bobby Hill, 2B, 2002–2003
- Glenallen Hill, OF, 1993–1995, 1998–2000
- Koyie Hill, C, 2007–12
- Rich Hill, P, 2005–2007
- Frank Hiller, P, 1950–1951
- Dave Hillman, P, 1955–1959
- Paul Hines, OF, 1874–1877
- Alex Hinshaw, P, 2012
- Gene Hiser, OF, 1971–1975
- Don Hoak, 3B, 1956
- Glen Hobbie, P, 1957–1964
- Porter Hodge, P, 2024–Present
- Billy Hoeft, P, 1965–1966
- Nico Hoerner, IF, 2019–present
- Guy Hoffman, P, 1986
- Larry Hoffman, 3B, 1901
- Solly Hofman, OF, 1904–1912, 1916
- Micah Hoffpauir, 1B, 2008–2010
- Brad Hogg, P, 1915
- Derek Holland, P, 2019
- Todd Hollandsworth, OF, 2004–2005
- Ed Holley, P, 1928
- Jessie Hollins, P, 1992
- John Hollison, P, 1892
- Charlie Hollocher, SS, 1918–1924
- Gavin Hollowell, P, 2024–Present
- Billy Holm, C, 1943–1944
- Fred Holmes, C, 1904
- Ken Holtzman, P, 1965–1971, 1978–1979
- Marty Honan, C, 1890–1891
- Burt Hooton, P, 1971–1975
- Trader Horne, P, 1929
- Rogers Hornsby, 2B, 1929–1932
- Cade Horton, P, 2025–Present
- Tim Hosley, C, 1975–1976
- Eric Hosmer, 1B, 2023
- John Houseman, 2B, 1894
- Tyler Houston, 3B, 1996–1999
- Del Howard, OF, 1907–1909
- Cal Howe, P, 1952
- Jay Howell, P, 1981
- Bob Howry, P, 2006–2008, 2010
- Mike Hubbard, C, 1995–1997
- Trenidad Hubbard, OF, 2003
- Ken Hubbs, 2B, 1961–1963
- Johnny Hudson, 2B, 1941
- Tom Hughes, P, 1900–1901
- Brandon Hughes, P, 2022–2023
- Jim Hughes, P, 1956
- Roy Hughes, 2B, 1944–1945
- Terry Hughes, 3B, 1970
- Joe Hughes, OF, 1902
- Jim Hughey, P, 1893
- Danny Hultzen, P, 2019
- Bob Humphreys, P, 1965
- Bert Humphries, P, 1913–1915
- Randy Hundley, C, 1966–1973, 1976–1977
- Todd Hundley, C, 2001–2002
- Herb Hunter, 3B, 1916, 1917
- Tommy Hunter, P, 2015
- Walt Huntzinger, P, 1926
- Don Hurst, 1B, 1934
- Jeff Huson, SS, 2000
- Ed Hutchinson, 2B, 1890
- Bill Hutchison, P, 1889–1895
- Herb Hutson, P, 1974

== I ==
- Blaise Ilsley, P, 1994
- Shōta Imanaga, 2024–Present
- Monte Irvin, OF, 1956
- Charlie Irwin, 3B, 1893–1895
- Frank Isbell, 1B, 1898
- César Izturis, SS, 2006–2007

== J ==
- Austin Jackson, OF, 2015
- Brett Jackson, CF, 2012
- Edwin Jackson, P, 2013–2015
- Larry Jackson, P, 1963–1966
- Danny Jackson, P, 1991–1992
- Damian Jackson, 2B, 2004
- Randy Jackson, 3B, 1950–1955, 1959
- Lou Jackson, OF, 1958–1959
- Darrin Jackson, OF, 1985–1989
- Elmer Jacobs, P, 1924–1925
- Tony Jacobs, P, 1948
- Mike Jacobs, SS, 1902
- Ray Jacobs, 1928
- Merwin Jacobson, OF, 1916
- Jake Jaeckel, P, 1964
- Joe Jaeger, P, 1920
- Art Jahn, OF, 1925
- Rick James, P, 1967
- Cleo James, OF, 1970–1973
- Jon Jay, OF, 2017
- Hal Jeffcoat, OF, 1948–1955
- Jeremy Jeffress, P, 2020
- Frank Jelincich, OF, 1941
- Fergie Jenkins, P, 1966–1973, 1982–1983
- Doug Jennings, OF, 1993
- Robin Jennings, OF, 1996–1997, 1999
- Garry Jestadt, 3B, 1971
- Jake Jewell, P, 2021
- Manny Jiménez, OF, 1969
- Abe Johnson, P, 1893
- Ben Johnson, P, 1959–1960
- Bill Johnson, P, 1983–1984
- Cliff Johnson, DH, 1980
- Don Johnson, 2B, 1943–1948
- Davey Johnson, 2B, 1978
- Footer Johnson, 1958
- Howard Johnson, 3B, 1995
- Ken Johnson, P, 1969
- Lance Johnson, OF, 1997–1999
- Lou Johnson, OF, 1960, 1968
- Pierce Johnson, P, 2017
- Reed Johnson, OF, 2008–09, 2011–12
- Jimmy Johnston, 3B, 1914
- Jay Johnstone, OF, 1982–1984
- Roy Joiner, P, 1934–1935
- Eric Jokisch, P, 2014
- Charley Jones, OF, 1877
- Clarence Jones, OF, 1967–1968
- Davy Jones, OF, 1902–1904
- Doug Jones, P, 1995–1996
- Jacque Jones, OF, 2006–2007
- Percy Jones, P, 1920–1922, 1925–1928
- Sam Jones, P, 1955–1956
- Sheldon Jones, P, 1953
- Claude Jonnard, P, 1929
- Billy Jurges, SS, 1931–1938, 1946–1947

== K ==
- Mike Kahoe, C, 1901–1902, 1907
- Don Kaiser, P, 1955–1957
- Al Kaiser, OF, 1911
- Ryan Kalish, OF, 2014, 2016
- John Kane, OF, 1909–1910
- Matt Karchner, P, 1998–2000
- Eric Karros, 1B, 2003
- Jack Katoll, P, 1898–1899
- Tony Kaufmann, P, 1921–1927
- Munenori Kawasaki, 2B, 2016
- Anthony Kay, P, 2023
- Teddy Kearns, 1B, 1924–1925
- Chick Keating, SS, 1913–1915
- Vic Keen, P, 1921–1925
- George Keerl, 2B, 1875
- John Kelleher, 3B, 1921–1923
- Mick Kelleher, SS, 1976–1980
- Brad Keller, P, 2025
- Frank Kellert, 1B, 1956
- Bob Kelly, P, 1951–1953
- Carson Kelly, C, 2025–Present
- George Kelly, 1B, 1930
- King Kelly, OF, 1880–1886
- Joe Kelly, OF, 1916
- Joe Kelly, OF, 1926–1928
- David Kelton, OF, 2003–2004
- Tony Kemp, 2B/OF, 2019
- Jason Kendall, C 2007
- Ted Kennedy, P, 1885
- Junior Kennedy, 2B, 1982–1983
- Snapper Kennedy, OF, 1902
- Matt Keough, P, 1986
- Marty Keough, OF, 1966
- Mel Kerr, 1925
- Don Kessinger, SS, 1966–1975
- Brooks Kieschnick, P, 1996–1997
- Pete Kilduff, 2B, 1917–1919
- Paul Kilgus, P, 1989
- Caleb Kilian, P, 2022–2024
- Bill Killefer, C, 1918–1921
- Frank Killen, P, 1900
- Matt Kilroy, P, 1898
- Newt Kimball, P, 1937–1938
- Craig Kimbrel, P, 2019–2021
- Bruce Kimm, C, 1979
- Jerry Kindall, 2B, 1956–1961
- Ralph Kiner, OF, 1953, 1954
- Chick King, OF, 1958–1959
- Jim King, OF, 1955–1956
- Ray King, P, 1999
- Dave Kingman, OF, 1978–1980
- Brandon Kintzler, P, 2018
- Walt Kinzie, SS, 1884
- Jason Kipnis, 2B, 2020–present
- Jim Kirby, PH, 1949
- Chris Kitsos, SS, 1954
- Andrew Kittredge, P, 2025
- Malachi Kittridge, C, 1890–1897
- Chuck Klein, OF, 1934–1936
- Johnny Kling, C, 1900–1911
- Johnny Klippstein, P, 1950–1954
- Joe Klugmann, 2B, 1921–1922
- Joe Kmak, C, 1995
- Otto Knabe, 2B, 1916
- Pete Knisely, OF, 1913–1915
- Darold Knowles, P, 1975–1976
- Mark Koenig, SS, 1932–1933
- Elmer Koestner, P, 1914
- Cal Koonce, P, 1962–1967
- John Koronka, P, 2005–2006
- Jim Korwan, P, 1897
- Fabian Kowalik, P, 1935, 1936
- Joe Kraemer, P, 1989–1990
- Randy Kramer, P, 1990
- Ken Kravec, P, 1981–1982
- Mike Kreevich, OF, 1931
- Mickey Kreitner, C, 1943–1944
- Jim Kremmel, P, 1974
- Bill Krieg, C, 1885
- Brooks Kriske, P, 2025
- Gus Krock, P, 1888–1889
- Rube Kroh, P, 1908–1910
- Chris Krug, C, 1965–1966
- Marty Krug, 3B, 1922
- Gene Krug, 1981
- Mike Krukow, P, 1976–1981
- Harvey Kuenn, OF, 1965–1966
- Jeff Kunkel, SS, 1992
- Emil Kush, P, 1941–1949

== L ==
- Tony La Russa, 2B, 1973
- Tommy La Stella, 2B, 2015–2018
- John Lackey, P, 2016-2017
- Pete Lacock, 1B, 1972–1976
- Doyle Lade, P, 1946–1950
- Tyler Ladendorf, IF, 2021
- Bryan LaHair, 1B, RF, 2011–12
- Junior Lake, OF, 2013–2015
- Steve Lake, C, 1983–1986, 1993
- Blake Lalli, C, 2012
- Jack Lamabe, P, 1968
- Pete Lamer, C, 1902
- Dennis Lamp, P, 1977–1980
- Hobie Landrith, C, 1956
- Bill Landrum, P, 1988
- Don Landrum, OF, 1962–1965
- Ced Landrum, OF, 1991
- Walt Lanfranconi, P, 1941
- Bill Lange, OF, 1893–1899
- Terry Larkin, P, 1878–1879
- Dave LaRoche, P, 1973–1974
- Vic LaRose, 2B, 1968
- Don Larsen, P, 1967
- Dan Larson, P, 1982
- Al Lary, P, 1954–1962
- Chuck Lauer, OF, 1890
- Jimmy Lavender, P, 1912–1916
- Vance Law, 3B, 1988–1989
- Matt Lawton, OF, 2005
- Tony Lazzeri, 2B, 1938
- Tommy Leach, OF, 1912–1914
- Fred Lear, 3B, 1918–1919
- Hal Leathers, SS, 1920
- Jack Leathersich, P, 2017
- Bill Lee, P, 1934–1943, 1947
- Don Lee, P, 1966
- Derrek Lee, 1B, 2004-2010
- Tom Lee, P, 1884
- Craig Lefferts, P, 1983
- Hank Leiber, OF, 1939–1941
- Jon Leicester, P, 2004–2005
- Lefty Leifield, P, 1912, 1913
- Mark Leiter Jr., P, 2022–2024
- DJ LeMahieu, IF, 2011
- Dick LeMay, P, 1963
- Dave Lemonds, P, 1969
- Bob Lennon, OF, 1957
- Ed Lennox, 3B, 1912
- Dutch Leonard, P, 1949–1953
- Roy Leslie, 1B, 1917
- Jon Lester, P, 2015–present
- Darren Lewis, OF, 2002
- Carlos Lezcano, OF, 1980–1981
- Jon Lieber, P, 1999–2002, 2008
- Gene Lillard, P, 1936–1939
- Brent Lillibridge, IF, 2013
- Ted Lilly, P, 2007–2010
- Freddie Lindstrom, 3B, 1935
- Cole Liniak, 3B, 1999–2000
- Brendon Little, P, 2022
- Luke Little, P, 2023–Present
- Dick Littlefield, P, 1957
- Jack Littrell, SS, 1957
- Mickey Livingston, C, 1943, 1945–1947
- José Lobatón, C, 2021
- Hans Lobert, 3B, 1905
- Bob Locker, P, 1973–1975
- Kameron Loe, P, 2013
- Kenny Lofton, OF, 2003
- Bob Logan, P, 1937, 1938
- Bill Long, P, 1990
- Dale Long, 1B, 1957–1959
- Davey Lopes, 2B, 1984–1986
- Jorge López, P, 2024
- Nicky Lopez, 2B, 2025
- Rafael Lopez, C, 2014
- Rodrigo López, P, 2011–12
- Andrew Lorraine, P, 1999–2000
- Richard Lovelady, P, 2024
- Jay Loviglio, 2B, 1983
- Grover Lowdermilk, P, 1912
- Bobby Lowe, 2B, 1902–1903
- Terrell Lowery, OF, 1997, 1998
- Turk Lown, P, 1951–1958
- Peanuts Lowrey, OF, 1942–1949
- Pat Luby, P, 1890–1892
- Jonathan Lucroy, C, 2019
- Fred Luderus, 1B, 1909–1910
- Mike Lum, OF, 1981
- Carl Lundgren, P, 1902–1909
- Tom Lundstedt, C, 1973–1974
- Keith Luuloa, SS, 2000
- Danny Lynch, 2B, 1948
- Ed Lynch, P, 1986, 1987
- Henry Lynch, OF, 1893
- Mike Lynch, OF, 1902
- Tom Lynch, P, 1884
- Red Lynn, P, 1944
- Dad Lytle, 2B, 1890

== M ==
- John Mabry, OF, 2006
- Robert Machado, C, 2001–2002
- José Macías, 3B, 2004–2005
- Bill Mack, P, 1908
- Ray Mack, 2B, 1947
- Steve Macko, 2B, 1979–1980
- Len Madden, P, 1912
- Clarence Maddern, OF, 1946–1949
- Greg Maddux, P, 1986–1992, 2004–2006
- Bill Madlock, 3B, 1974–1976
- Sal Madrid, SS, 1947
- Nick Madrigal, 2B, 2022–2024
- Dave Magadan, 3B, 1996
- Lee Magee, OF, 1919
- George Magoon, SS, 1899
- Freddie Maguire, 2B, 1928
- Ron Mahay, P, 2001–02
- Paul Maholm, P, 2012
- Pat Mahomes, P, 2002
- Mike Mahoney, C, 2000, 2002
- Scott Maine, P, 2010–12
- Willard Mains, P, 1888
- Oswaldo Mairena, P, 2000
- George Maisel, OF, 1921–1922
- Mike Maksudian, 1B, 1994
- John Malarkey, P, 1899
- Candy Maldonado, OF, 1993
- Martín Maldonado, C, 2019
- Pat Malone, P, 1928–1934
- Fergy Malone, C, 1874
- Billy Maloney, OF, 1905
- Trey Mancini, 1B, 2023
- Gus Mancuso, C, 1939
- Hal Manders, P, 1946
- Les Mann, OF, 1916–1919
- Garth Mann, P, 1944
- Dick Manville, P, 1952
- Dillon Maples, P, 2017–2021
- Rabbit Maranville, SS, 1925
- Jake Marisnick, OF, 2021
- Carlos Mármol, P, 2006–2013
- Brailyn Márquez, P, 2020
- Gonzalo Márquez, 1B, 1973, 1974
- Luis Márquez, OF, 1954
- Jason Marquis, P, 2006–2008
- William Marriott, 3B, 1917–1921
- Doc Marshall, C, 1908
- Jim Marshall, 1B, 1958–1959
- Sean Marshall, P, 2006–11
- Chris Martin, P, 2022
- Frank Martin, 3B, 1898
- J. C. Martin, C, 1970–1972
- Jerry Martin, OF, 1979–1980
- Leonys Martin, OF, 2017
- Mike Martin, C, 1986
- Morrie Martin, P, 1959
- Riley Martin, P, 2026-Present
- Speed Martin, P, 1918–1922
- Stu Martin, 2B, 1943
- Nick Martini, OF, 2021
- Carmelo Martínez, OF, 1983
- Dave Martinez, OF, 1986–1988, 2000
- José Martínez, OF, 2020
- Ramón Martínez, SS, 2003–2004
- Sandy Martínez, C, 1998–1999
- Joe Marty, OF, 1937–1939
- Randy Martz, P, 1980–1982
- Mike Mason, P, 1987
- Gordon Massa, C, 1957–1958
- Miles Mastrobuoni, OF, 2023-2024
- Juan Mateo, P, 2006
- Marcos Mateo, 2010–11
- Joe Mather, OF, 3B, 2012
- Nelson Mathews, OF, 1960–1963
- Gary Matthews, OF, 1984–1987
- Gary Matthews Jr., OF, 2000–2001
- Bobby Mattick, SS, 1938–1940
- Brian Matusz, P, 2016
- Gene Mauch, 2B, 1948–1949
- Hal Mauck, P, 1893
- Carmen Mauro, OF, 1948–1951
- Jason Maxwell, 2B, 1998
- Jakie May, P, 1931–1932
- Scott May, P, 1991
- Derrick May, OF, 1990–1994
- Cameron Maybin, OF, 2020
- Ed Mayer, P, 1957–1958
- Cory Mazzoni, P, 2018
- Bill McAfee, P, 1930
- Jim McAnany, OF, 1961–1962
- Ike McAuley, SS, 1925
- Algie McBride, OF, 1896
- Bill McCabe, OF, 1918–1919
- Bill McCabe, OF, 1920
- Dutch McCall, P, 1948
- Alex McCarthy, 2B, 1915, 1916
- Jack McCarthy, OF, 1900, 1903–1905
- Jim McCauley, C, 1885
- Harry McChesney, OF, 1904
- Scott McClain, 1B, 2005
- Bill McClellan, 2B, 1878
- Lloyd McClendon, OF, 1989–1990
- George McConnell, P, 1914, 1916
- Jim McCormick, P, 1885, 1886
- Barry McCormick, 3B, 1896–1901
- Clyde McCullough, C, 1940–1948, 1953–1956
- Lindy McDaniel, P, 1963–1965
- Darnell McDonald, OF, 2013
- Ed McDonald, 3B, 1913
- Chuck McElroy, P, 1991–1993
- Monte McFarland, P, 1895–1896
- Casey McGehee, P, 2008
- Willie McGill, P, 1893–1894
- Dan McGinn, P, 1972
- Gus McGinnis, P, 1893
- Lynn McGlothen, P, 1978–1981
- Fred McGriff, 1B, 2001–2002
- Reese McGuire, C, 2025
- Harry McIntire, P, 1910–1912
- Zach McKinstry, UT, 2022
- Jim McKnight, 3B, 1960–1962
- Polly McLarry, 2B, 1915
- Larry McLean, C, 1903
- Cal McLish, P, 1949–1951
- Jimmy McMath, OF, 1968
- Norm McMillan, 3B, 1928–1929
- Brian McNichol, P, 1999
- Brian McRae, OF, 1995–1997
- Cal McVey, 1B, 1876–1877
- George Meakim, P, 1892
- Yoervis Medina, P, 2015
- Russ Meers, P, 1941–1947
- Trevor Megill, P, 2021
- Dave Meier, OF, 1988
- Ryan Meisinger, P, 2021
- Sam Mejías, OF, 1979
- Jock Menefee, P, 1900–1903
- Conner Menez, P, 2022
- Rudy Meoli, SS, 1978
- Orlando Merced, OF, 1998
- Kent Mercker, P, 2004
- Ron Meridith, P, 1984–1985
- Fred Merkle, 1B, 1917–1920
- Lloyd Merriman, OF, 1955
- Bill Merritt, C, 1891
- Julian Merryweather, P, 2023–2025
- Sam Mertes, OF, 1898–1900
- Lennie Merullo, SS, 1941–1947
- Matt Mervis, 1B, 2023–2024
- Steve Mesner, 3B, 1938–1939
- Catfish Metkovich, OF, 1953
- Roger Metzger, SS, 1970
- Alex Metzler, OF, 1925
- Dutch Meyer, 2B, 1937
- Russ Meyer, P, 1946–1948, 1956
- Levi Meyerle, 3B, 1874
- Chad Meyers, 2B, 1999–2001
- Ralph Michaels, 3B, 1924–1926
- Ed Mickelson, 1B, 1957
- Matt Mieske, OF, 1997–1998
- Pete Mikkelsen, P, 1967–1968
- Hank Miklos, P, 1944
- Eddie Miksis, 2B, 1951–1956
- Aaron Miles, IF, 2009
- Wade Miley, P, 2022
- Bob Miller, P, 1970–1971
- Damian Miller, C, 2003
- Doc Miller, OF, 1910
- Dusty Miller, OF, 1902
- Hack Miller, OF, 1922–1925
- Ian Miller, OF, 2020
- Joe Miller, 2B, 1875
- Kurt Miller, P, 1998–2000
- Ox Miller, P, 1947
- Shelby Miller, P, 2021
- Tyson Miller, P, 2020, 2024
- Wade Miller, P, 2006–2007
- Ward Miller, OF, 1912–1913
- Hoby Milner, P, 2026
- Alec Mills, P, 2018–2022
- George Milstead, P, 1924–1926
- Paul Minner, P, 1950–1956
- Mike Mitchell, OF, 1913
- Sergio Mitre, P, 2003–2005
- George Mitterwald, C, 1974–1977
- Bill Moisan, P, 1953
- José Molina, C, 1999
- Bob Molinaro, OF, 1982
- Fritz Mollwitz, 1B, 1913–1914, 1916
- Rick Monday, OF, 1972–1976
- Craig Monroe, OF, 2007
- Lou Montañez, OF, 2011
- Miguel Montero, C, 2015–2017
- Mike Montgomery, P, 2016-2019
- Al Montreuil, 2B, 1972
- George Moolic, C, 1886
- Charley Moore, SS, 1912
- Donnie Moore, P, 1975–1979
- Earl Moore, P, 1913
- Johnny Moore, OF, 1928–1932, 1945
- Scott Moore, 3B, 2006–2007
- Jake Mooty, P, 1940–1943
- Jerry Morales, OF, 1974–1977, 1981–1983
- Bill Moran, C, 1895
- Pat Moran, C, 1906–1909
- Mickey Morandini, 2B, 1997–1999
- Seth Morehead, P, 1959, 1960
- Christopher Morel, 3B, 2022–2024
- Ramón Morel, P, 1997
- Keith Moreland, OF, 1982–1987
- Adam Morgan, P, 2021
- Bobby Morgan, 2B, 1957, 1958
- Eli Morgan, P, 2025
- Mike Morgan, P, 1991–1995, 1998
- Vern Morgan, 3B, 1954–1955
- Moe Morhardt, 1B, 1961–1962
- George Moriarty, 3B, 1903–1904
- Jim Moroney, P, 1912
- Ed Morris, P, 1922
- Frank Morrissey, P, 1902
- Brandon Morrow, P, 2017
- Walt Moryn, OF, 1956–1960
- Paul Moskau, P, 1983
- Jim Mosolf, OF, 1933
- Mal Moss, P, 1930
- Jason Motte, P, 2015
- Jamie Moyer, P, 1986–1988
- Phil Mudrock, P, 1963
- Bill Mueller, 3B, 2000–2002
- Terry Mulholland, P, 1997–1999
- Eddie Mulligan, 3B, 1915–1916
- Jerry Mumphrey, OF, 1986–1988
- Bob Muncrief, P, 1949
- Joe Munson, OF, 1925–1926
- Bobby Murcer, OF, 1977–1979
- Daniel Murphy, 2B, 2018
- Danny Murphy, P, 1960–1962
- Donnie Murphy, 3B, 2013
- BJ Murray, 3B, 2026-Present
- Jim Murray, OF, 1902
- Red Murray, OF, 1915
- Tony Murray, OF, 1923
- Calvin Murray, OF, 2004
- Matt Murton, LF, 2005–2008
- Randy Myers, P, 1993–1995
- Rodney Myers, P, 1996–2000
- Billy Myers, SS, 1941
- Richie Myers, PR/PH, 1956

== N ==
- Chris Nabholz, P, 1995
- Xavier Nady, OF, 2010
- Tom Nagle, C, 1890–1891
- Tommy Nance, P, 2021
- Buddy Napier, P, 1918
- Joe Nathan, P, 2016
- Joey Nation, P, 1999–2001
- Dioner Navarro, C, 2013
- Efren Navarro, 1B, 2018
- Jaime Navarro, P, 1995–1996
- Tom Needham, C, 1909–1914
- Jack Neely, P, 2024
- Cal Neeman, C, 1957–1960
- Art Nehf, P, 1927–1929
- Lynn Nelson, P, 1930–1934
- Dick Nen, 1B, 1968
- Héctor Neris, P, 2024
- Phil Nevin, 1B, 2006
- Sean Newcomb, P, 2022
- Joel Newkirk, P, 1919–1920
- Ray Newman, P, 1971
- Charlie Newman, OF, 1892
- Bobo Newsom, P, 1932
- Dolan Nichols, P, 1958
- Art Nichols, C, 1898–1900
- Bill Nicholson, OF, 1939–1948
- Hugh Nicol, OF, 1881–1882
- George Nicol, OF, 1891
- Tomás Nido, C, 2024
- Joe Niekro, P, 1967–1969
- José Nieves, SS, 1998–2001
- Al Nipper, P, 1988
- Paul Noce, 2B, 1987
- Dickie Noles, P, 1982–1984, 1987
- Pete Noonan, C, 1906
- Wayne Nordhagen, OF, 1983
- Irv Noren, OF, 1959, 1960
- Fred Norman, P, 1964–1967
- Daniel Norris, P, 2022
- Billy North, OF, 1971–1972
- Ron Northey, OF, 1950, 1952
- Phil Norton, P, 2000, 2003
- James Norwood, P, 2018–2020
- Don Nottebart, P, 1969
- Lou Novikoff, OF, 1941–1944
- Roberto Novoa, P, 2005–2006
- Rube Novotney, C, 1949
- José Antonio Núñez, P, 1990
- Rich Nye, P, 1966–1969

== O ==
- Mike O'Berry, C, 1980
- John O'Brien, 2B, 1893
- Pete O'Brien, 2B, 1890
- Johnny O'Connor, C, 1916
- Ken O'Dea, C, 1935–1938
- Bob O'Farrell, C, 1915–1925, 1934
- Hal O'Hagan, 1B, 1902
- Troy O'Leary, OF, 2003
- Ryan O'Malley, P, 2006
- Emmett O'Neill, P, 1946
- Jack O'Neill, C, 1904–1905
- Will Ohman, P, 2000–2001, 2005–2007
- Augie Ojeda, SS, 2000–2003, 2006
- Gene Oliver, C, 1968–1969
- Nate Oliver, 2B, 1969
- Vern Olsen, P, 1939–1946
- Barney Olsen, OF, 1941
- Mike Olt, 3B, 2014–2015
- Steve Ontiveros, 3B, 1977–1980
- Rey Ordóñez, SS, 2004
- Kevin Orie, 3B, 1997–1998, 2002
- Rafael Ortega, OF, 2021–2022
- José Ortiz, OF, 1971
- Ramón Ortiz, P, 2011
- Bob Osborn, P, 1925–1930
- Tiny Osborne, P, 1922–1924
- Donovan Osborne, P, 2002
- Josh Osich, P, 2020
- Johnny Ostrowski, OF, 1943–1946
- Reggie Otero, 1B, 1945
- Billy Ott, OF, 1962–1964
- Dave Otto, P, 1994
- Orval Overall, P, 1906–1913
- Ernie Ovitz, P, 1911
- Mickey Owen, C, 1949–1951
- Dave Owen, SS, 1983–1985

== P ==
- Gene Packard, P, 1916–1917
- Nicholas Padilla, P, 2022
- Andy Pafko, OF, 1943–1951
- Ángel Pagán, OF, 2006–2007
- Vance Page, P, 1938–1941
- Karl Pagel, 1B, 1978–1979
- Daniel Palencia, P, 2023–Present
- Donn Pall, P, 1994
- Rafael Palmeiro, 1B, 1986–1988
- Milt Pappas, P, 1970–1973
- Erik Pappas, C, 1991
- Enoli Paredes, P, 2024
- Isaac Paredes, 3B, 2024
- Mark Parent, C, 1994–1995
- Blake Parker, P, 2012–2014
- Doc Parker, P, 1893–1896
- Roy Parmelee, P, 1937
- Jiggs Parrott, 3B, 1892–1895
- Tom Parrott, OF, 1893
- Dode Paskert, OF, 1918–1920
- Claude Passeau, P, 1939–1947
- Reggie Patterson, P, 1983–1985
- Bob Patterson, P, 1996–1998
- Corey Patterson, OF, 2000–2005
- Eric Patterson, OF, 2007–2008
- Ken Patterson, P, 1992
- David Patton, P, 2009
- Spencer Patton, P, 2016
- Josh Paul, C, 2003
- Mike Paul, P, 1973, 1974
- Dave Pavlas, P, 1990–1991
- Ted Pawelek, C, 1946
- Tyler Payne, C, 2021
- George Pearce, P, 1912–1916
- Nate Pearson, P, 2024–2025
- Charlie Pechous, 3B, 1916–1917
- Joc Pederson, OF, 2021
- Jorge Pedre, C, 1992
- Chick Pedroes, OF, 1902
- Carlos Peña, 1B, 2011
- Félix Peña, P, 2016-2017
- Roberto Peña, SS, 1965–1966
- Ken Penner, P, 1929
- Joe Pepitone, 1B, 1970–1973
- Joel Peralta, P, 2016
- Hernán Pérez, IF, 2020
- Mike Pérez, P, 1995–1996
- Neifi Pérez, SS, 2004–2006
- Yorkis Pérez, P, 1991
- Harry Perkowski, P, 1955
- Jon Perlman, P, 1985
- Scott Perry, P, 1916
- Pat Perry, P, 1988, 1989
- John Peters, SS, 1874–1879
- Billy Petrick, P, 2007
- Bob Pettit, OF, 1887–1888
- Jesse Petty, P, 1930
- Big Jeff Pfeffer, P, 1905, 1910
- Fred Pfeffer, 2B, 1883–1889, 1891, 1896–1897
- Jack Pfiester, P, 1906–1911
- Josh Phegley, C, 2020
- Art Phelan, 3B, 1913–1915
- Babe Phelps, C, 1933–1934
- David Phelps, P, 2019
- Taylor Phillips, P, 1958–1959
- Adolfo Phillips, OF, 1966–1969
- Tom Phoebus, P, 1972
- Bill Phyle, P, 1898–1899
- Charlie Pick, 2B, 1918, 1919
- Eddie Pick, 3B, 1927
- Jeff Pico, P, 1988–1990
- Félix Pie, OF, 2007-2008
- Ray Pierce, P, 1924
- Andy Piercy, 2B, 1881
- Bill Piercy, P, 1926
- Juan Pierre, CF, 2005–2006
- Carmen Pignatiello, P, 2007
- George Piktuzis, P, 1956
- Horacio Piña, P, 1974
- Marc Pisciotta, P, 1997–1999
- Pinky Pittenger, SS, 1925
- Juan Pizarro, P, 1970–1973
- Whitey Platt, OF, 1942–1943
- Dan Plesac, P, 1992–1994
- Bill Plummer, C, 1968
- Tom Poholsky, P, 1957
- Howie Pollet, P, 1953–1955
- Drew Pomeranz, P, 2025
- Elmer Ponder, P, 1921
- Tom Poorman, OF, 1880
- Paul Popovich, 2B, 1964–1967, 1969–1973
- Bo Porter, OF, 1999
- Bob Porterfield, P, 1959
- Bill Powell, P, 1912
- Phil Powers, C, 1878
- Willie Prall, P, 1975
- Johnny Pramesa, C, 1952
- Andy Pratt, P, 2004
- Todd Pratt, C, 1995
- Mike Prendergast, P, 1916–1917
- Tot Pressnell, P, 1941–1942
- Ryan Pressly, P, 2025
- Ray Prim, P, 1943–1946
- Don Prince, P, 1962
- Mark Prior, P, 2002–2006
- Mike Proly, P, 1982–1983
- Ed Putman, C, 1976–1978
- Zach Putnam, P, 2013
- John Pyecha, P, 1954
- Shadow Pyle, P, 1887

== Q ==
- Jim Qualls, OF, 1969
- Joe Quest, 2B, 1879–1882
- Rubén Quevedo, P, 2000
- Wimpy Quinn, P, 1941
- Paddy Quinn, C, 1875
- Frank Quinn, OF, 1899
- Luis Quiñones, 3B, 1987
- Jose Quintana, P, 2017–2020
- Esteban Quiroz, IF, 2022

== R ==
- Dick Radatz, P, 1967
- Dave Rader, C, 1978
- Ken Raffensberger, P, 1940–1941
- Pat Ragan, P, 1909
- Steve Rain, P, 1999–2000
- Chuck Rainey, P, 1983–1984
- Brooks Raley, P, 2012–2013
- Bob Ramazzotti, 2B, 1949–1953
- Aramis Ramírez, 3B, 2003–11
- Neil Ramirez, P, 2014–2016
- Domingo Ramos, SS, 1989–1990
- Willie Ramsdell, P, 1952
- Fernando Ramsey, OF, 1992
- Newt Randall, OF, 1907
- Len Randle, 3B, 1980
- Merritt Ranew, C, 1963–1964
- Cody Ransom, 3B, 2013
- Clay Rapada, P, 2007
- Dennis Rasmussen, P, 1992
- Tommy Raub, C, 1903
- Bob Raudman, OF, 1966–1967
- Fred Raymer, 2B, 1901
- Colin Rea, P, 2020, 2025–Present
- Frank Reberger, P, 1968
- Anthony Recker, C, 2012
- Jeff Reed, C, 1999–2000
- Phil Regan, P, 1968–1972
- Herman Reich, 1B, 1949
- Josh Reilly, 2B, 1896
- Hal Reilly, OF, 1919
- Laurie Reis, P, 1877–1878
- Ken Reitz, 3B, 1981
- Mike Remlinger, P, 2003–2005
- Jack Remsen, OF, 1878–1879
- Laddie Renfroe, P, 1991
- Steve Renko, P, 1976, 1976
- Michael Restovich, OF, 2006
- Ed Reulbach, P, 1905–1913
- Rick Reuschel, P, 1972–1981, 1983–1984
- Paul Reuschel, P, 1975–1978
- Franmil Reyes, OF, 2022
- Jose Reyes, C, 2006
- Archie Reynolds, P, 1968–1970
- Carl Reynolds, OF, 1937–1939
- Bob Rhoads, P, 1902
- Tuffy Rhodes, OF, 1993–1995
- Len Rice, C, 1945
- Del Rice, C, 1960
- Hal Rice, OF, 1954
- Clayton Richard, P, 2015-2016
- Fred Richards, 1B, 1951
- Lance Richbourg, OF, 1932
- Lew Richie, P, 1910–1913
- Beryl Richmond, P, 1933
- Reggie Richter, P, 1911
- Marv Rickert, OF, 1942–1947
- George Riley, P, 1979–1980
- Edwin Ríos, 1B, 2023
- Allen Ripley, P, 1982
- Alfonso Rivas, 1B, 2021–2022
- Rene Rivera, C, 2017
- Roberto Rivera, P, 1995
- Anthony Rizzo, 1B, 2012–2021
- Donn Roach. P, 2015
- Skel Roach, P, 1899
- Mel Roach, 2B, 1961
- Fred Roat, 3B, 1892
- Kevin Roberson, OF, 1993–1995
- Dave Roberts, P, 1977, 1978
- Ethan Roberts, P, 2022, 2024–Present
- Robin Roberts, P, 1966
- Daryl Robertson, SS, 1962
- Dave Robertson, OF, 1919–1921
- David Robertson, P, 2022
- Don Robertson, OF, 1954
- Jeff Robinson, P, 1992
- Andre Rodgers, SS, 1961–1964
- Fernando Rodney. P, 2015
- Freddy Rodríguez, P, 1958
- Henry Rodríguez, OF, 1997–2000
- Henry Rodríguez, P, 2013
- Manuel Rodríguez, P, 2021–2022
- Roberto Rodriquez, P, 1970
- Billy Rogell, SS, 1940
- Taylor Rogers, P, 2025
- Dan Rohn, 2B, 1983–1984
- Mel Rojas, P, 1997
- Andrew Romine, UT, 2021
- Austin Romine, C, 2021
- Héctor Rondón, P, 2013–2017
- Rolando Roomes, OF, 1988
- Charlie Root, P, 1926–1941
- Randy Rosario, P, 2018-2019
- Dave Rosello, 2B, 1972–1977
- John Roskos, OF, 2001
- David Ross, C, 2015–2016
- Gary Ross, P, 1968–1969
- Zac Rosscup, P, 2013–2017
- Jack Rowan, P, 1911
- Wade Rowdon, 3B, 1987
- Dave Rowe, OF, 1877
- Luther Roy, P, 1927
- Vic Roznovsky, C, 1964–1965
- Michael Rucker, P, 2021–2023
- Ken Rudolph, C, 1969–1973
- Dutch Rudolph, OF, 1904
- Dutch Ruether, P, 1917
- Justin Ruggiano, OF, 2014
- Glendon Rusch, P, 2004–2006
- Bob Rush, P, 1948–1957
- Chris Rusin, P, 2012–2014
- Addison Russell, 2B, 2015-2019
- Jack Russell, P, 1938–1939
- James Russell, P, 2010–2014
- Rip Russell, 1B, 1939–1942
- Dick Ruthven, P, 1983–1986
- Jason Ryan, P, 1999
- Jimmy Ryan, OF, 1885–1889, 1891–1900
- Kyle Ryan, P, 2019–2021
- Jae Kuk Ryu, P, 2006

== S ==
- Casey Sadler, P, 2020
- Vic Saier, 1B, 1911–1917
- Luis Salazar, 3B, 1989–1992
- Ángel Salazar, SS, 1988
- Jeff Samardzija, P, 2008–2014
- Adrian Sampson, P, 2021–2022
- Eduardo Sánchez, P, 2013
- Jesús Sánchez, P, 2002
- Félix Sánchez, P, 2003
- Rey Sánchez, SS, 1991–1997
- Ryne Sandberg, 2B, 1982–1994, 1996–1997
- Scott Sanders, P, 1998–1999
- Scott Sanderson, P, 1984–1989
- Carlos Santana, 1B, 2025
- Benito Santiago, C, 1999
- Ron Santo, 3B, 1960–1973
- Dave Sappelt, OF, 2012–2013
- Ed Sauer, OF, 1943–1945
- Hank Sauer, OF, 1949–1955
- Ted Savage, OF, 1967, 1968
- Carl Sawatski, C, 1948–1953
- Bobby Scales, IF-OF, 2009-2010
- Bob Scanlan, P, 1991–1993
- Germany Schaefer, 2B, 1901–1902
- Jimmie Schaffer, C, 1963–1964
- Joe Schaffernoth, P, 1959–1961
- Bob Scheffing, C, 1941–1950
- Hank Schenz, 2B, 1946–1949
- Morrie Schick, OF, 1917
- Nate Schierholtz, OF, 2013-2014
- Calvin Schiraldi, P, 1988–1989
- Larry Schlafly, 2B, 1902
- Brian Schlitter, P, 2010, 2014–2015
- Freddy Schmidt, P, 1947
- Johnny Schmitz, P, 1941–1951
- Ed Schorr, P, 1915
- Paul Schramka, OF, 1953
- Hank Schreiber, 3B, 1926
- Pop Schriver, C, 1891–1894
- Al Schroll, P, 1960
- Art Schult, 1B, 1959–1960
- Johnny Schulte, C, 1929
- Frank Schulte, OF, 1904–1916
- Bob Schultz, P, 1951–1953
- Barney Schultz, P, 1961–1963
- Buddy Schultz, P, 1975–1976
- Joe Schultz, OF, 1915
- Don Schulze, P, 1983–1984
- Wayne Schurr, P, 1964
- Bill Schuster, SS, 1943–1945
- Kyle Schwarber, C, 2015–present
- Rudy Schwenck, P, 1909
- Frank Schwindel, 1B, 2021–2022
- Dick Scott, P, 1964
- Gary Scott, 3B, 1991–1992
- Milt Scott, 1B, 1882
- Pete Scott, OF, 1926–1927
- Rodney Scott, 2B, 1978
- Tom Seaton, P, 1916–1917
- Frank Secory, OF, 1944–1946
- Herman Segelke, P, 1982
- Kurt Seibert, 2B, 1979
- Dick Selma, P, 1969
- Mike Sember, 3B, 1977–1978
- Manny Seoane, P, 1978
- Dan Serafini, P, 1999
- Bill Serena, 3B, 1949–1954
- Scott Servais, C, 1995–1998
- Tommy Sewell, 1927
- Orator Shaffer, OF, 1879
- Art Shamsky, OF, 1972
- Red Shannon, 2B, 1926
- Bobby Shantz, P, 1964
- Bob Shaw, P, 1967
- Matt Shaw, 3B, 2025–Present
- Sam Shaw, P, 1893
- Marty Shay, 2B, 1916
- Al Shealy, P, 1930
- Dave Shean, 2B, 1911
- Jimmy Sheckard, OF, 1906–1912
- Tommy Shields, 2B, 1993
- Clyde Shoun, P, 1935–1937
- Terry Shumpert, 2B, 1996
- Ed Sicking, 2B, 1916
- Walter Signer, P, 1943–1945
- Carlos Silva, P, 2010
- Charlie Silvera, C, 1957
- Andrelton Simmons, SS, 2022
- Curt Simmons, P, 1966, 1967
- Randall Simon, 1B, 2003
- Duke Simpson, P, 1953
- Elmer Singleton, P, 1957–1959
- Ted Sizemore, 2B, 1979
- Roe Skidmore, 1970
- Jimmy Slagle, OF, 1902–1908
- Cy Slapnicka, P, 1911
- Sterling Slaughter, P, 1964
- Lefty Sloat, P, 1949
- Heathcliff Slocumb, P, 1991–1993
- Roy Smalley, SS, 1948–1953
- Aleck Smith, C, 1904
- Bob Smith, P, 1931–1932
- Bob Smith, P, 1959
- Bobby Smith, OF, 1962
- Bull Smith, OF, 1906
- Charley Smith, 3B, 1969
- Charlie Smith, P, 1911–1914
- Dave Smith, P, 1991–1992
- Dwight Smith, OF, 1989–1993
- Earl Smith, OF, 1916
- Greg Smith, 2B, 1989–1990
- Harry Smith, 2B, 1877
- Jason Smith, 2B, 2001
- Joe Smith, P, 2016
- Lee Smith, P, 1980–1987
- Paul Smith, 1B, 1958
- Willie Smith, OF, 1968–1970
- Drew Smyly, P, 2022–2024
- Steve Smyth, P, 2002
- Brad Snyder, OF, 2010
- Miguel Socolovich, P, 2012
- Eric Sogard, IF, 2021
- Jorge Soler, OF, 2014–2016
- Marcelino Solis, P, 1958
- Eddie Solomon, P, 1975
- Andy Sommers, C, 1889
- Rudy Sommers, P, 1912
- Lary Sorensen, P, 1985
- Alfonso Soriano, LF, 2007–2013
- Rafael Soriano, P, 2015
- Michael Soroka, P, 2025
- Sammy Sosa, OF, 1992–2004
- Geovany Soto, C, 2005–12
- Steven Souza Jr., OF, 2020
- Al Spalding, P, 1876–1878
- Al Spangler, OF, 1967–1971
- Bob Speake, OF, 1955–1957
- Justin Speier, P, 1998
- Chris Speier, SS, 1985–1986
- Rob Sperring, 2B, 1974–1976
- Carl Spongberg, P, 1908
- Jerry Spradlin, P, 2000
- Charlie Sprague, OF, 1887
- Jack Spring, P, 1964
- Locke St. John, P, 2022
- Jim St. Vrain, P, 1902
- Eddie Stack, P, 1913–1914
- Tuck Stainback, OF, 1934–1937
- Matt Stairs, OF, 2001
- Gale Staley, 2B, 1925
- Pete Standridge, P, 1915
- Eddie Stanky, 2B, 1943, 1944
- Joe Stanley, OF, 1909
- Tom Stanton, C, 1904
- Ray Starr, P, 1945
- Joe Start, 1B, 1878
- Jigger Statz, OF, 1922–1925
- Ed Stauffer, P, 1923
- John Stedronsky, 3B, 1879
- Justin Steele, 2021–Present
- Kennie Steenstra, P, 1998
- Ed Stein, P, 1890–1891
- Randy Stein, P, 1982
- Harry Steinfeldt, 3B, 1906–1910
- Rick Stelmaszek, C, 1974
- Jake Stenzel, OF, 1890
- Earl Stephenson, P, 1971
- Joe Stephenson, C, 1944
- John Stephenson, C, 1967–1968
- Phil Stephenson, 1B, 1989
- Riggs Stephenson, OF, 1926–1934
- Walter Stephenson, C, 1935–1936
- Dave Stevens, P, 1997–1998
- Jeff Stevens, P, 2009–11
- Morrie Steevens, P, 1962
- Ace Stewart, 2B, 1895
- Ian Stewart, 3B, 2012
- Jimmy Stewart, OF, 1963–1967
- Kohl Stewart, P, 2021
- Mack Stewart, P, 1944–1945
- Tuffy Stewart, OF, 1913–1914
- Robert Stock, P, 2021
- Tim Stoddard, P, 1984
- Steve Stone, P, 1974–1976
- Bill Stoneman, P, 1967–1968
- Eric Stout, P, 2022
- Dan Straily, P, 2014
- Joe Strain, 2B, 1981
- Sammy Strang, 3B, 1900, 1902
- Doug Strange, 3B, 1991–1992
- Scott Stratton, P, 1894, 1895
- Lou Stringer, 2B, 1941–1946
- Marcus Stroman, P, 2022–2023
- Pedro Strop, P, 2013–2019, 2021
- George Stueland, P, 1921–1925
- Bobby Sturgeon, SS, 1940–1947
- Tanyon Sturtze, P, 1995–1996
- Chris Stynes, 3B, 2002
- Bill Sullivan, OF, 1878
- John Sullivan, OF, 1921
- Marty Sullivan, OF, 1887–1888
- Mike Sullivan, P, 1890
- Champ Summers, OF, 1975–1976
- Billy Sunday, OF, 1883–1887
- Jim Sundberg, C, 1987–1988
- Rick Sutcliffe, P, 1984–1991
- Sy Sutcliffe, C, 1884–1885
- Bruce Sutter, P, 1976–1980
- Seiya Suzuki, OF, 2022–Present
- Dansby Swanson, SS, 2023–Present
- Matt Swarmer, P, 2022
- Dave Swartzbaugh, P, 1995–1997
- Bill Sweeney, 2B, 1907, 1914
- Ryan Sweeney, OF, 2013–2014
- Les Sweetland, P, 1931
- Steve Swisher, C, 1974–1977
- Matt Szczur, OF, 2014–2017

== T ==
- Jerry Tabb, 1B, 1976
- Pat Tabler, 1B, 1981–1982
- So Taguchi, OF, 2009
- Jameson Taillon, P, 2023–Present
- Hisanori Takahashi, P, 2013
- Bob Talbot, OF, 1953–1954
- Chuck Tanner, OF, 1957, 1958
- Kevin Tapani, P, 1996–2001
- El Tappe, C, 1954–1962
- Ted Tappe, OF, 1955
- Bennie Tate, C, 1934
- Ramón Tatís, P, 1997
- Mike Tauchman, OF, 2023–2024
- Julián Tavárez, P, 2001
- Chink Taylor, OF, 1925
- Danny Taylor, OF, 1929–1932
- Harry Taylor, 1B, 1932
- Jack Taylor (1900s pitcher), P, 1898–1903, 1906-1907
- Sammy Taylor, C, 1958–1962
- Tony Taylor, 2B, 1958–1960
- Zack Taylor, C, 1929–1933
- Bud Teachout, P, 1930–1931
- Taylor Teagarden, C, 2014-2015
- Patsy Tebeau, 1B, 1887
- Amaury Telemaco, P, 1996–1998
- John Tener, P, 1888–1889
- Ryan Tepera, P, 2020–2021
- Adonis Terry, P, 1894–1897
- Zeb Terry, SS, 1920–1922
- Wayne Terwilliger, 2B, 1949–1951
- Bob Tewksbury, P, 1987–1988
- Moe Thacker, C, 1958–1962
- Ryan Theriot, 2B, 2005–2010
- Caleb Thielbar, P, 2025–Present
- Red Thomas, OF, 1921
- Frank Thomas, OF, 1960–1961, 1966
- Lee Thomas, OF, 1966–1967
- Keegan Thompson, P, 2021–2024
- Scot Thompson, OF, 1978–1983
- Trayce Thompson, OF, 2021
- Bobby Thomson, OF, 1958–1959
- Andre Thornton, DH, 1973–1976
- Walter Thornton, OF, 1895–1898
- Bob Thorpe, P, 1955
- Dick Tidrow, P, 1979–1982
- Bobby Tiefenauer, P, 1968
- Ozzie Timmons, OF, 1995–1996
- Ben Tincup, P, 1928
- Jesus Tinoco, P, 2024
- Joe Tinker, SS, 1902–1912, 1916
- Bud Tinning, P, 1932–1934
- Al Todd, C, 1940–1943
- Jim Todd, P, 1974, 1977
- Chick Tolson, 1B, 1926–1930
- Ron Tompkins, P, 1971
- Fred Toney, P, 1911–1913
- Luis Torrens, C, 2023
- Héctor Torres, SS, 1971
- Paul Toth, P, 1962–1964
- Steve Trachsel, P, 1993–1999, 2007
- Chad Tracy, 1B-3B, 2010
- Jim Tracy, OF, 1980–1981
- Bill Traffley, C, 1878
- Fred Treacey, OF, 1874
- Bill Tremel, P, 1954–1956
- Manny Trillo, 2B, 1975–1978, 1986–1988
- Coaker Triplett, OF, 1938
- Steve Trout, P, 1983–1987
- Harry Truby, 2B, 1895–1896
- Jen-Ho Tseng, P, 2017
- Kyle Tucker, OF, 2025
- Michael Tucker, OF, 2001
- Pete Turgeon, SS, 1923
- Jacob Turner, P, 2014
- Justin Turner, 1B, 2025
- Ted Turner, P, 1920
- Babe Twombly, OF, 1920–1921
- Lefty Tyler, P, 1918–1921
- Earl Tyree, C, 1914
- Jim Tyrone, OF, 1972–1975
- Wayne Tyrone, OF, 1976
- Mike Tyson, 2B, 1980–1981

== U ==
- Koji Uehara, P, 2017
- Erich Uelmen, P, 2022
- Duane Underwood Jr., P, 2018, 2020–present
- John Upham, P, 1967–1968
- Bob Usher, OF, 1952

== V ==
- Mike Vail, OF, 1978–1980
- Chris Valaika, 3B, 2014
- Luis Valbuena, 3B, 2012–2014
- Pedro Valdés, OF, 1994–1998
- Ismael Valdez, P, 2000
- Vito Valentinetti, P, 1956–1957
- Jermaine Van Buren, P, 2005
- George Van Haltren, OF, 1887–1889
- Todd Van Poppel, P, 2000–2001
- Ben Van Ryn, P, 1998
- Ike Van Zandt, OF, 1904
- Hy Vandenberg, P, 1944–1945
- Johnny Vander Meer, P, 1950
- Andy Varga, P, 1950–1951
- Ildemaro Vargas, IF, 2020–2021, 2022
- Gary Varsho, OF, 1988–1990
- Hippo Vaughn, P, 1913–1921
- Luis Vázquez, SS, 2024
- Nelson Velázquez, OF, 2022–2023
- Emil Verban, 2B, 1948–1950
- José Veras, P, 2014
- Randy Veres, P, 1994
- Dave Veres, P, 2003
- Joe Vernon, P, 1912
- Tom Veryzer, SS, 1983–1984
- Tom Vickery, P, 1891
- Carlos Villanueva, P, 2013–2014
- Héctor Villanueva, C, 1990–1992
- Jonathan Villar, 2B, 2022
- Josh Vitters, 3B, 2012
- Arodys Vizcaíno, P, 2014
- José Vizcaíno, SS, 1991–1993
- Luis Vizcaíno, P, 2009
- Otto Vogel, OF, 1923–1924
- Bill Voiselle, P, 1950
- Chris Volstad, P, 2012

== W ==
- Tsuyoshi Wada, P, 2014-2015
- Jason Waddell, P, 2009
- Rube Waddell, P, 1901
- Ben Wade, P, 1948
- Gale Wade, OF, 1955–1956
- Dave Wainhouse, P, 2000–2001
- Eddie Waitkus, 1B, 1941–1948
- Charlie Waitt, OF, 1877
- Matt Walbeck, C, 1993
- Chico Walker, OF, 1985–1987, 1991–1992
- Harry Walker, OF, 1949
- Mike Walker, P, 1995
- Roy Walker, P, 1917–1918
- Rube Walker, C, 1948–1951
- Todd Walker, 2B, 2004–2006
- Jack Wallace, C, 1915
- Tye Waller, 3B, 1981–1982
- Joe Wallis, OF, 1975–1978
- Lee Walls, OF, 1957–1959
- Les Walrond, P, 2006
- Tom Walsh, C, 1906
- Jerome Walton, OF, 1989–1992
- Chris Ward, OF, 1972–1974
- Daryle Ward, IF, 2007–2008
- Dick Ward, P, 1934
- Preston Ward, 1B, 1950–1953
- Lon Warneke, P, 1930–1936, 1942, 1943–1945
- Hooks Warner, 3B, 1921
- Jack Warner, P, 1962–1965
- Adam Warren, P, 2016
- Rabbit Warstler, SS, 1940
- Carl Warwick, OF, 1966
- Fred Waterman, 3B, 1875
- Logan Watkins, 2B, 2013—2014
- Doc Watson, P, 1913
- Eddie Watt, P, 1975
- David Weathers, P, 2001
- Harry Weaver, P, 1917–1919
- Jim Weaver, P, 1934
- Orlie Weaver, P, 1910–1911
- Earl Webb, OF, 1927–1928
- Jacob Webb, P, 2026-Present
- Allen Webster, P, 2018
- Ray Webster, 1B, 1971
- Mitch Webster, OF, 1988–1989
- Jake Weimer, P, 1903–1905
- Lefty Weinert, P, 1927–1928
- Butch Weis, OF, 1922–1925
- Johnny Welch, P, 1926–1931
- Todd Wellemeyer, P, 2003–2006
- Randy Wells, P, 2008–12
- Turk Wendell, P, 1993–1997
- Don Wengert, P, 1998
- Hayden Wesneski, P, 2022–2024
- Rip Wheeler, P, 1923–1924
- Pete Whisenant, OF, 1956
- Deacon White, 3B, 1876
- Derrick White, 1B, 1998
- Elder White, SS, 1962
- Jerry White, OF, 1978
- Rondell White, OF, 2000–2001
- Warren White, 3B, 1875
- Earl Whitehill, P, 1939
- Eli Whiteside, C, 2014
- Rowan Wick, P, 2019–2022
- Bob Wicker, P, 1903–1906
- Jordan Wicks, P, 2023–Present
- Brad Wieck, P, 2019–2021
- Charlie Wiedemeyer, P, 1934
- Milt Wilcox, P, 1975
- Hoyt Wilhelm, P, 1970
- Harry Wilke, 3B, 1927
- Curtis Wilkerson, SS, 1989–1990
- Dean Wilkins, P, 1989–1990
- Rick Wilkins, C, 1991–1995
- Bob Will, OF, 1957–1963
- Art Williams, OF, 1902
- Billy Williams, OF, 1959–1974
- Brian Williams, P, 2000
- Cy Williams, OF, 1912–1917
- Dewey Williams, C, 1944–1947
- Jerome Williams, P, 2005–2006
- Mitch Williams, P, 1989–1990
- Otto Williams, SS, 1903–1904
- Pop Williams, P, 1902–1903
- Trevor Williams, P, 2021
- Wash Williams, OF, 1885
- Scott Williamson, P, 2005–2006
- Ned Williamson, 3B, 1879–1889
- Jim Willis, P, 1953–1954
- Bump Wills, 2B, 1982
- Walt Wilmot, OF, 1890–1895
- Art Wilson, C, 1916–1917
- Enrique Wilson, 2B, 2005
- Hack Wilson, OF, 1926–1931
- Justin Wilson, P, 2017-2018
- Steve Wilson, P, 1989–1991
- Willie Wilson, OF, 1993–1994
- Ed Winceniak, 3B, 1956–1957
- Trey Wingenter, P, 2024
- Dan Winkler, P, 2020–2021
- Kettle Wirts, C, 1921–1923
- Patrick Wisdom, 3B, 2020–2024
- Casey Wise, 2B, 1957
- Harry Wolfe, SS, 1917
- Harry Wolter, OF, 1917
- Tony Wolters, C, 2021
- Harry Wolverton, 3B, 1898–1900
- Tony Womack, 2B, 2003, 2006
- Kerry Wood, P, 1998–2008, 2011-2012
- Travis Wood, P, 2012—2016
- Brad Woodall, P, 1999–2000
- Gary Woods, OF, 1982–1985
- Jim Woods, 3B, 1957
- Walt Woods, P, 1898
- Brandon Workman, P, 2021
- Gage Workman, 3B, 2025
- Tim Worrell, P, 2000
- Chuck Wortman, SS, 1916–1918
- Bob Wright, P, 1915
- Dave Wright, P, 1897
- Mel Wright, P, 1960–1961
- Pat Wright, 2B, 1890
- Wesley Wright, P, 2014
- Rick Wrona, C, 1988–1990
- Michael Wuertz, P, 2004–2007
- Marvell Wynne, OF, 1989–1990
- Hank Wyse, P, 1942–1947

== Y ==
- George Yantz, C, 1912
- Eric Yelding, SS, 1993
- Carroll Yerkes, P, 1932–1933
- Steve Yerkes, 2B, 1916
- Lefty York, P, 1921
- Tony York, SS, 1944
- Gus Yost, P, 1893
- Elmer Yoter, 3B, 1927–1928
- Anthony Young, P, 1994–1995
- Danny Young, P, 2000
- Don Young, OF, 1965–1969
- Eric Young, 2B, 2000–2001
- Jared Young, UT, 2022–2023

== Z ==
- Zip Zabel, P, 1913–1915
- Mark Zagunis, OF, 2017-2019
- Geoff Zahn, P, 1975, 1976
- Carlos Zambrano, P, 2001–11
- Eduardo Zambrano, OF, 1993–1994
- Oscar Zamora, P, 1974–1976
- Rob Zastryzny, P, 2016-2018
- Rollie Zeider, 2B, 1916–1918
- Todd Zeile, 3B, 1995
- George Zettlein, P, 1874–1875
- Bob Zick, P, 1954
- Don Zimmer, 3B, 1960–1961
- Heinie Zimmerman, 3B, 1907–1916
- Ben Zobrist, 2B, 2016-2019
- Julio Zuleta, 1B, 2000–2001
- Dutch Zwilling, OF, 1916

== Sources ==
- Chicago Cubs official web site
