= 1962 Chicago Cubs season =

1962 Chicago Cubs
- League: National League
- Ballpark: Wrigley Field
- City: Chicago
- Record: 59–103 (.364)
- League place: 9th
- Owners: Philip K. Wrigley
- General managers: John Holland
- Managers: Lou Klein, El Tappe, Charlie Metro
- Television: WGN-TV (Jack Brickhouse, Vince Lloyd)
- Radio: WGN (Jack Quinlan, Lou Boudreau)

The 1962 Chicago Cubs season was the 91st season of the Chicago Cubs franchise, the 87th in the National League and the 47th at Wrigley Field. In the second season under their College of Coaches, the Cubs finished ninth in the National League with a record of 59–103, 42 1/2 games behind the NL Champion San Francisco Giants. The Cubs finished ahead of the expansion New York Mets and behind the expansion Houston Colt .45s in the NL's first 162-game season.

== Offseason ==
- October 10, 1961: 1961 MLB expansion draft
  - Don Zimmer was drafted from the Cubs by the New York Mets.
  - Ed Bouchee was drafted from the Cubs by the New York Mets.
- Prior to 1962 season: J. C. Hartman was returned by the Cubs to the Houston Buffaloes after the expiration of their minor league working agreement.

== Regular season ==
=== Season standings ===
National League
Team	W	L	Pct.	GB	Home	Road
San Francisco Giants	103	62	.624	—	61‍–‍21	42‍–‍41
Los Angeles Dodgers	102	63	.618	1	54‍–‍29	48‍–‍34
Cincinnati Reds	98	64	.605	3½	58‍–‍23	40‍–‍41
Pittsburgh Pirates	93	68	.578	8	51‍–‍30	42‍–‍38
Milwaukee Braves	86	76	.531	15½	49‍–‍32	37‍–‍44
St. Louis Cardinals	84	78	.519	17½	44‍–‍37	40‍–‍41
Philadelphia Phillies	81	80	.503	20	46‍–‍34	35‍–‍46
Houston Colt .45s	64	96	.400	36½	32‍–‍48	32‍–‍48
Chicago Cubs	59	103	.364	42½	32‍–‍49	27‍–‍54
New York Mets	40	120	.250	60½	22‍–‍58	18‍–‍62

=== Record vs. opponents ===
1962 National League record Sources:
Team	CHC	CIN	HOU	LAD	MIL	NYM	PHI	PIT	SF	STL
Chicago	—	4–14	7–11	4–14	8–10	9–9	10–8	4–14	6–12	7–11
Cincinnati	14–4	—	13–5	9–9	13–5	13–5	8–10	13–5	7–11	8–10
Houston	11–7	5–13	—	6–12	7–11	13–3–1	1–17	5–13	7–11	9–9–1
Los Angeles	14–4	9–9	12–6	—	10–8	16–2	14–4	10–8	10–11	7–11
Milwaukee	10–8	5–13	11–7	8–10	—	12–6	11–7	10–8	7–11	12–6
New York	9–9	5–13	3–13–1	2–16	6–12	—	4–14	2–16	4–14	5–13
Philadelphia	8–10	10–8	17–1	4–14	7–11	14–4	—	7–10	5–13	9–9
Pittsburgh	14–4	5–13	13–5	8–10	8–10	16–2	10–7	—	7–11	12–6
San Francisco	12–6	11–7	11–7	11–10	11–7	14–4	13–5	11–7	—	9–9
St. Louis	11–7	10–8	9–9–1	11–7	6–12	13–5	9–9	6–12	9–9	—

=== Notable transactions ===
- April 26, 1962: Paul Casanova was released by the Cubs.
- April 26, 1962: Sammy Taylor was traded by the Cubs to the New York Mets for Bob Smith.
- June 5, 1962: Bob Smith and Daryl Robertson were traded by the Cubs to the St. Louis Cardinals for Alex Grammas and Don Landrum.

=== Roster ===
1962 Chicago Cubs
Roster
Pitchers: 32 Bob Anderson; 39 Tony Balsamo; 38 Jim Brewer; 31 Bob Buhl; 42 Freddie Burdette; 43 Don Cardwell; 42 Jack Curtis; 37 Dick Ellsworth; 36 Don Elston; 31,45 Dave Gerard; 30,33 George Gerberman; 40 Glen Hobbie; 34 Cal Koonce; 46 Al Lary; 48 Don Prince; 41 Barney Schultz; 35 Morrie Steevens; 39 Paul Toth; 38 Jack Warner	Catchers: 9 Cuno Barragan; 6 Dick Bertell; 52 El Tappe; 7 Sammy Taylor; 8 Moe Thacker; Infielders: 14 Ernie Banks; 11 Alex Grammas; 16 Ken Hubbs; 15 Jim McKnight; 19 Daryl Robertson; 18 Andre Rodgers; 10 Ron Santo; 19 Elder White	Outfielders: 21 George Altman; 24 Lou Brock; 27 Don Landrum; 23 Nelson Mathews; 27 Danny Murphy; 20 Billy Ott; 23 Bobby Gene Smith; 28 Bob Will; 26 Billy Williams; Other batters: 22 Jim McAnany; 11 Moe Morhardt	Head coach: 60 Lou Klein; 63 Charlie Metro; 52 El Tappe; Coaches College of Coaches

== Player stats ==
= Indicates team leader

=== Batting ===
==== Starters by position ====
Note: Pos = Position; G = Games played; AB = At bats; H = Hits; Avg. = Batting average; HR = Home runs; RBI = Runs batted in

Pos	Player	G	AB	H	Avg.	HR	RBI
C	Dick Bertell	77	215	65	.302	2	18
1B	Ernie Banks	154	610	164	.269	37	104
2B	Ken Hubbs	160	661	172	.260	5	49
SS	Andre Rodgers	138	461	128	.278	5	44
3B	Ron Santo	162	604	137	.227	17	83
LF	Billy Williams	159	618	184	.298	22	91
CF	Lou Brock	123	434	114	.263	9	35
RF	George Altman	147	534	170	.318	22	74

==== Other batters ====
Note: G = Games played; AB = At bats; H = Hits; Avg. = Batting average; HR = Home runs; RBI = Runs batted in

Player	G	AB	H	Avg.	HR	RBI
Don Landrum	83	238	67	.282	1	15
Cuno Barragan	58	134	27	.201	0	12
Moe Thacker	65	107	20	.187	0	9
Bob Will	87	92	22	.239	2	15
Jim McKnight	60	85	19	.224	0	5
Alex Grammas	23	60	14	.233	0	3
Elder White	23	53	8	.151	0	1
El Tappe	26	53	11	.208	0	6
Nelson Mathews	15	49	15	.306	2	13
Danny Murphy	14	35	7	.200	0	3
Bob Smith	13	29	5	.172	0	2
Billy Ott	12	28	4	.143	1	2
Daryl Robertson	9	19	2	.105	0	2
Moe Morhardt	18	16	2	.125	0	2
Sammy Taylor	7	15	2	.133	0	1
Jim McAnany	7	6	0	.000	0	0

=== Pitching ===
==== Starting pitchers ====
Note: G = Games pitched; IP = Innings pitched; W = Wins; L = Losses; ERA = Earned run average; SO = Strikeouts

Player	G	IP	W	L	ERA	SO
Bob Buhl	34	212.0	12	13	3.69	109
Dick Ellsworth	37	208.2	9	20	5.09	113
Don Cardwell	41	195.2	7	16	4.92	104
Cal Koonce	35	190.2	10	10	3.97	84
George Gerberman	1	5.1	0	0	1.69	1

==== Other pitchers ====
Note: G = Games pitched; IP = Innings pitched; W = Wins; L = Losses; ERA = Earned run average; SO = Strikeouts

Player	G	IP	W	L	ERA	SO
Glen Hobbie	42	162.0	5	14	5.22	87
Al Lary	15	34.0	0	1	7.15	18
Paul Toth	6	34.0	3	1	4.24	11
Jack Curtis	4	18.0	0	2	3.50	8

==== Relief pitchers ====
Note: G = Games pitched; W = Wins; L = Losses; SV = Saves; ERA = Earned run average; SO = Strikeouts

Player	G	W	L	SV	ERA	SO
Don Elston	57	4	8	8	2.44	37
Bob Anderson	57	2	7	4	5.02	82
Barney Schultz	51	5	5	5	3.82	58
Dave Gerard	39	2	3	3	4.91	30
Tony Balsamo	18	0	1	0	6.44	27
Morrie Steevens	12	0	1	0	2.40	5
Freddie Burdette	8	0	0	1	3.72	5
Jack Warner	7	0	0	0	7.71	3
Jim Brewer	6	0	1	0	9.53	1
Don Prince	1	0	0	0	0.00	0

== Awards and honors ==
All-Star Game

- Ernie Banks, First Base, Reserve, First and Second Game
- George Altman, Outfield, Reserve, Second Game
- Billy Williams, Outfield, Reserve, Second Game

== Farm system ==
Level	Team	League	Manager
AAA	Salt Lake City Bees	Pacific Coast League	Bob Kennedy
AA	San Antonio Missions	Texas League	Walt Dixon
B	Wenatchee Chiefs	Northwest League	Joe Macko
C	St. Cloud Rox	Northern League	George Freese
D	Palatka Cubs	Florida State League	Hal Jeffcoat, Bobby Adams, Ripper Collins and Verlon Walker

LEAGUE CHAMPIONS: Wenatchee
Salt Lake City affiliation shared with Cleveland Indians
