= Steve Macko =

American baseball player (1954–1981)

- Infielder
- Born: September 6, 1954; Burlington, Iowa, U.S.
- Died: November 15, 1981 (aged 27); Arlington, Texas, U.S.
- Batted: Left Threw: Right

MLB debut
- August 18, 1979, for the Chicago Cubs

Last MLB appearance
- August 6, 1980, for the Chicago Cubs

MLB statistics
- Batting average: .250
- Home runs: 0
- Runs batted in: 5
- Stats at Baseball Reference

Teams
- Chicago Cubs (1979–1980)

Steven Joseph Macko (September 6, 1954 – November 15, 1981) was an American professional baseball player, who played in Major League Baseball (MLB) for the Chicago Cubs. Macko played three infield positions in 25 games during the 1979 and 1980 seasons. His rising baseball career ended when he died as a result of testicular cancer in November 1981.

== Early life ==
As a child, Steve Macko was a batboy for the Texas Rangers. He attended Bishop Dunne Catholic School. His father Joe Macko had played and coached in the minor leagues and later worked as the longtime clubhouse manager for the Rangers.

== Baseball career ==
Macko was an All-American at Baylor University and was a key part of the team that made it to the College World Series in 1977. The Chicago Cubs selected Macko in the fifth round of the 1977 Major League Baseball draft. He played in the minors and was called up from Triple-A in 1979 and 1980.

In his 25 games with the Cubs, he hit .250 with fifteen hits (three of them doubles), four walks, and eleven strikeouts. Playing second base, third base, and shortstop, he made 32 putouts, 47 assists, and no errors. With the Cubs, Macko wore the number 12.

In 1980, Macko's promising career stalled when he incurred a bad bruise in a collision with Bill Madlock in the first game of a doubleheader against the Pittsburgh Pirates on August 5, 1980. Madlock slid hard into Macko attempting to break up a double play in the top of the sixth inning. In the bottom of the inning, a hurting Macko drove in a run with a double and was pinch-run for by Rick Reuschel. Macko never played another game in the majors, as doctors discovered he had testicular cancer. Macko died of the disease on November 15, 1981.

== Legacy ==
Macko's family has endowed several scholarships in his name at Baylor University, Bishop Dunne Catholic School, and other institutions. Bishop Dunne later dedicated their baseball field in his name. Baylor University inducted Macko into the Baylor Athletics Hall of Fame in 1988, and dedicated the Steve Macko Locker Room at Baylor Ballpark. Macko was inducted into the Southwest Conference Hall of Fame in 2017.

== See also ==
- Chicago Cubs all-time roster
- List of baseball players who died during their careers
