= George Gerberman =

American baseball player (1942–2022)

- Pitcher
- Born: March 8, 1942; El Campo, Texas, U.S.
- Died: January 7, 2022 (aged 79); El Campo, Texas, U.S.
- Batted: Right Threw: Right

MLB debut
- September 23, 1962, for the Chicago Cubs

Last MLB appearance
- September 23, 1962, for the Chicago Cubs

MLB statistics
- Win–loss record: 0–0
- Earned run average: 1.69
- Innings pitched: 5⅓
- Stats at Baseball Reference

Teams
- Chicago Cubs (1962)

George Alois Gerberman (March 8, 1942 – January 7, 2022) was an American professional baseball player. Gerberman, a 6 ft (1.8 m), 180 lb (82 kg) right-handed pitcher, had an eight-season (1961–1968) career spent in the farm systems of the Milwaukee Braves, Chicago Cubs and Houston Astros, but he appeared in one Major League Baseball game for the 1962 Cubs. He was the starting pitcher on September 23 against the first-year New York Mets at the Polo Grounds and allowed only one earned run over 5⅓ innings, but did not gain a decision in an eventual 2–1 Chicago defeat.

Gerberman had been drafted by the Cubs out of the Brave organization after his debut season in professional baseball. After posting a 13–5 record with 13 complete games with the Class B Wenatchee Chiefs in 1962, he was recalled by Chicago when the rosters expanded in September. In Gerberman's lone Major League appearance, he gave up only three hits, but allowed five bases on balls and one home run, to the Mets' Frank Thomas. The long ball — only the second hit of the game for the Mets — tied the game at one in the sixth inning. Gerberman got the next hitter, Ed Kranepool, on a ground ball, but he then surrendered a single to Sammy Drake and was relieved by Freddie Burdette thereafter.

Gerberman recorded one strikeout (of Jim Hickman) in his only MLB appearance.
