= Clarence Jones (baseball) =

American baseball player (born 1940)

- Outfielder / First baseman / Coach
- Born: November 7, 1940 (age 85); Birmingham, Alabama, U.S.
- Batted: Left Threw: Left

Professional debut
- MLB: April 20, 1967, for the Chicago Cubs
- NPB: 1970, for the Nankai Hawks

Last appearance
- MLB: September 25, 1968, for the Chicago Cubs
- NPB: 1977, for the Osaka Kintetsu Buffaloes

MLB statistics
- Batting average: .248
- Home runs: 2
- Runs batted in: 16

NPB statistics
- Batting average: .239
- Home runs: 246
- Runs batted in: 562
- Stats at Baseball Reference

Teams
- As player: Chicago Cubs (1967–1968); Nankai Hawks (1970–1973); Osaka Kintetsu Buffaloes (1974–1977); As coach: Atlanta Braves (1989–1998); Cleveland Indians (2000–2001)

Career highlights and awards
- Best Nine Award (1974); World Series champion (1995)

Clarence Woodrow Jones (born November 7, 1940) is an American former professional baseball player and coach. He played in Major League Baseball (MLB) from 1967 and 1968 for the Chicago Cubs. Listed at 6' 2", 185 lb., Jones batted and threw left-handed. He was born in Birmingham, Alabama

== Career ==
In a two-season career, Jones was a .248 hitter (34-for-137) with two home runs and 16 RBI in 58 games, including 13 runs and seven doubles.

Following his majors career, Jones played in Japan for the Kintetsu Buffaloes of the Pacific League. In 1974, he hit 38 home runs to lead the league, becoming the first foreign player to win a home run title in Nippon Professional Baseball (NPB). He led the Pacific League again with 36 home runs in 1976.

He is the father of actor Richard T. Jones, and Clarence Jones Jr., a high school basketball coach.

== See also ==
- 1966 Chicago Cubs season
- 1967 Chicago Cubs season
- 1974 in baseball
- Chicago Cubs all-time roster

Preceded by	Atlanta Braves Hitting Coach; 1989-1998	Succeeded by Don Baylor
Preceded by Charlie Manuel	Cleveland Indians Hitting Coach; 2000-2001	Succeeded by Eddie Murray
