= Moe Thacker =

American baseball player (1934–1997)

- Catcher
- Born: May 21, 1934; Louisville, Kentucky, U.S.
- Died: November 13, 1997 (aged 63); Louisville, Kentucky, U.S.
- Batted: Right Threw: Right

MLB debut
- August 3, 1958, for the Chicago Cubs

Last MLB appearance
- July 14, 1963, for the St. Louis Cardinals

MLB statistics
- Batting average: .177
- Home runs: 2
- Runs batted in: 20
- Stats at Baseball Reference

Teams
- Chicago Cubs (1958, 1960–1962); St. Louis Cardinals (1963)

Morris Benton Thacker (May 21, 1934 – November 13, 1997) was an American professional baseball player. A catcher, Thacker's pro career extended for 13 seasons and included the entire 1962 campaign and parts of four others in Major League Baseball for the Chicago Cubs (1958; 1960–62) and St. Louis Cardinals (1963). He threw and batted right-handed, stood 6 feet 3 inches (1.91 m) tall and weighed 205 pounds (93 kg).

== Baseball career ==
Thacker was born in Louisville, Kentucky, and signed with the New York Yankees in 1952 after his graduation from duPont Manual High School. After six years in the Yankee farm system, he was acquired by the Cubs and was recalled in August 1958 from the Double-A Texas League. In the third at bat of his debut game August 3 at Connie Mack Stadium, he hit a home run off Seth Morehead of the Philadelphia Phillies to help the Cubs out-slug the Phils, 12–10. Two days later, in his third MLB game, he hit another solo shot, this time against Stu Miller of the San Francisco Giants, helping the Cubs hang on to win another slugfest, 10–9 at Wrigley Field. They would be his only Major League home runs in 158 games played and 260 at bats.

Thacker returned to the minor leagues for all of 1959 and part of 1960. During the latter year, he played in 54 games with Chicago and split catching duties with left-handed-hitting Sammy Taylor. But Thacker slipped to third string in 1961 and 1962 behind starter Dick Bertell and primary backups Taylor and Cuno Barragan. Only in 1962 did he spend the entire year on the Cubs' National League roster, appearing in a career-high 65 games, 35 as a starting catcher. But he batted only .187.

At the end of the season, October 17, he was included in a trade with the Cardinals, packaged with outfielder George Altman and pitcher Don Cardwell in a deal for pitchers Larry Jackson and Lindy McDaniel and catcher Jimmie Schaffer.

Sent to Triple-A by the Cardinals at the outset of 1963, Thacker was recalled in July for three games, including his final starting assignment on July 3. Facing Baseball Hall of Famer Sandy Koufax—and catching another Hall-bound pitcher, Bob Gibson—Thacker struck out in his only two plate appearances. Koufax shut out the Cardinals on three hits, 5–0. Thacker returned to minors for the balance of his career, retiring in 1964.

In his 158 big-league games, Thacker had 46 total hits, with seven doubles, his two rookie-season home runs and 20 runs batted in, batting .177. He died in his home city of Louisville at the age of 63.
