= Dave Gerard (baseball) =

American baseball player (1936–2001)

- Pitcher
- Born: August 6, 1936; New York City, New York, U.S.
- Died: October 10, 2001 (aged 65); Newtown, Pennsylvania, U.S.
- Batted: Right Threw: Right

MLB debut
- April 10, 1962, for the Chicago Cubs

Last MLB appearance
- September 29, 1962, for the Chicago Cubs

MLB statistics
- Win–loss record: 2–3
- Earned run average: 4.91
- Innings pitched: 58 2/3
- Stats at Baseball Reference

Teams
- Chicago Cubs (1962)

David Frederick Gerard (August 6, 1936 – October 10, 2001), was an American professional baseball player, a right-handed pitcher whose career extended for ten seasons (1955–1964). A native of New York City, he grew up in Yardley, Pennsylvania. Gerard stood 6 feet 2 inches (1.88 m) tall and weighed 205 pounds (93.0 kg). He appeared in the Major Leagues in 39 games as a relief pitcher in 1962 for the Chicago Cubs.

Gerhard was signed by the Cubs as an amateur free agent. In 58 2/3 innings pitched for the ninth-place Cubs, Gerard allowed 67 hits and 28 bases on balls. He struck out 30 and recorded three saves.

Shortly before the 1963 season opened, Gerhard was traded to the Houston Colt .45s along with Danny Murphy for Hal Haydel, Dick LeMay and Merritt Ranew. He spent the entire season with the Oklahoma City 89ers, the Colt .45s' AAA minor league affiliate. After beginning the 1964 season in Oklahoma City, he was traded to the Pittsburgh Pirates organization and finished his playing career with the AAA Columbus Jets.
