= Johnny O'Connor (baseball) =

Irish baseball player (1891–1982)

- Catcher
- Born: December 1, 1891; Cahersiveen, Ireland
- Died: May 30, 1982 (aged 90); Bonner Springs, Kansas, U.S.
- Batted: Right Threw: Right

MLB debut
- September 16, 1916, for the Chicago Cubs

Last MLB appearance
- September 16, 1916, for the Chicago Cubs

MLB statistics
- Games played: 1
- At bats: 0
- Stats at Baseball Reference

Teams
- Chicago Cubs (1916)

John Charles O'Connor (December 1, 1891 – May 30, 1982) was an Irish-born Major League Baseball player. Nicknamed "Bucky", he played one game at catcher for the Chicago Cubs on September 16, 1916. The game was against the Philadelphia Phillies and it was played at the Baker Bowl. In the game, O'Connor replaced the Cubs' Rowdy Elliott after he "split" his finger on a foul tip. The Cubs' other catchers, Jimmy Archer and Art Wilson, were themselves injured. O'Connor caught one inning until Wilson, who had been sitting in the grandstand, then "limped" to the Cubs' clubhouse to put on his uniform, replaced O'Connor and finished the game. Philadelphia won the game 6–3.

== Sources ==
- Career statistics from Baseball Reference · Retrosheet · Baseball Almanac
