= Moe Morhardt =

American baseball player (born 1937)

- First baseman
- Born: January 16, 1937 (age 89); Manchester, Connecticut, U.S.
- Batted: Left Threw: Left

MLB debut
- September 7, 1961, for the Chicago Cubs

Last MLB appearance
- May 19, 1962, for the Chicago Cubs

MLB statistics
- Batting average: .206
- Home runs: 0
- Runs batted in: 3
- Stats at Baseball Reference

Teams
- Chicago Cubs (1961–1962)

Meredith Goodwin "Moe" Morhardt (born January 16, 1937) is an American former Major League Baseball (MLB) first baseman. He played parts of the 1961 and 1962 seasons with the Chicago Cubs, appearing in 25 major league games.

== Playing career ==
Morhardt attended the University of Connecticut, where he was a two-sport All-American in soccer and baseball, also playing basketball during his freshman year.

After three seasons of baseball at Connecticut, Morhardt was signed by the Chicago Cubs as an amateur free agent in summer 1959. He spent the remainder of 1959 at three minor league levels, spending most of the season with the Class D Paris Lakers. He spent all of 1960 with the Class A Lancaster Red Roses. He was assigned to the minor leagues again in 1961 and played much of the season with the Class B Wenatchee Chiefs. In September, he was called up to the Cubs and made his major league debut on September 7, 1961. He appeared in seven games for the Cubs that month, starting each at first base and hitting .278.

Morhardt began the 1962 season with Chicago, appearing in 18 games as a pinch-hitter. After hitting .125 with the Cubs, Morhardt was sent down to the minor leagues and split the rest of the season between Class B Wenatchee and Class AA San Antonio.

He spent 1963 and 1964 in the minor leagues before retiring from professional baseball following the 1964 season.

== Coaching career ==
After his playing career, Morhardt was the head baseball coach at The Gilbert School in Winsted, Connecticut from 1967 to 1987, also serving, at times, as the school's boys' soccer coach, boys' basketball coach, and athletic director. As head baseball coach, Morhardt had a record of 299–134, winning eight league titles and four Class M state championships. Starting prior to the 1988 season, Morhardt coached for seven seasons for the Hartford Hawks college baseball team, serving as an assistant from 1988 to 1992 and head coach from 1993 to 1994. From 1997 to 1999, he was the head coach of the Western Connecticut Colonials baseball team. Morhardt also spent time as the head coach of the Danbury Westerners of the New England Collegiate Baseball League, coaching the team from 1998–2004.

Morhardt was elected to the Manchester Sports Hall of Fame on May 20, 1980.

== Personal life ==
Morhardt had three sons and one daughter, Kyle, Darryl, Greg and Wendy. Darryl played baseball professional in the Atlanta Braves farm system before transitioning to coaching. Greg played professionally in the Minnesota Twins and Detroit Tigers systems before transitioning to coaching. As a scout for the Los Angeles Angels, Greg Morhardt was credited with discovering Mike Trout as a high school baseball player.

== Head coaching record ==
=== NCAA ===
Record table
Season	Team	Overall	Conference	Standing	Postseason
Hartford Hawks (North Atlantic Conference) (1993–1994)
1993	Hartford	20–27	9–15	6th	NAC Tournament
1994	Hartford	22–27	10–11	5th	NAC Tournament
Hartford:		42–54	19–26		
Western Connecticut State Colonials (Little East Conference) (1997–1999)
1997	Western Connecticut State	13–16	5–9	3rd (South)	
1998	Western Connecticut State	15–22	3–11	8th	LEC Tournament
1999	Western Connecticut State	4–22	1–13	8th	
Western Connecticut State:		32–60	9–33		
Total:		74–114			

=== Collegiate summer baseball ===
==== NECBL ====
Season	Team	Record	Standing	Playoffs
1998	Danbury	25–17	2nd	Semifinals
1999	Danbury	23–19	T–4th	Finals
2000	Danbury	21–20	5th	
2001	Danbury	17–23	4th (National)	
2002	Danbury	25–16	1st (Western)	Semifinals
2003	Danbury	22–17	5th	Quarterfinals
2004	Danbury	15–25	7th (Southern)	
Total		148–137		
