= Tony Balsamo =

American baseball player (1936–2026)

- Pitcher
- Born: July 21, 1936; New York City, U.S.
- Died: March 12, 2026 (aged 89); Holbrook, New York, U.S.
- Batted: Right Threw: Right

MLB debut
- April 14, 1962, for the Chicago Cubs

Last MLB appearance
- June 26, 1962, for the Chicago Cubs

MLB statistics
- Win–loss record: 0–1
- Earned run average: 6.44
- Strikeouts: 27
- Stats at Baseball Reference

Teams
- Chicago Cubs (1962)

Anthony Alred Balsamo (July 21, 1936 – March 12, 2026) was an American Major League Baseball player, who pitched one season for the Chicago Cubs.

== College career ==
Balsamo played college baseball for the Fordham University Rams. As a senior co-captain, he had a 4–2 record and 2.17 ERA.

== Professional career ==
In 1959, the Chicago Cubs signed Balsamo as a free agent. He spent three seasons in the minors, before being promoted to the Cubs ahead of the 1962 season. He made his MLB debut on April 14, 1962, pitching two scoreless innings. He pitched in 29 1/3 innings and recorded a 0–1 record with a 6.44 ERA over the first three months of the season, but was optioned to the AA San Antonio Missions at the end of June. Balsamo never appeared in a game the Cubs won. He only played in one big league season.

== Personal life ==
Balsamo owned Donato's Restaurant in Rockville Centre, New York, from 1977–2002.

== Death ==
Balsamo died in Holbrook, New York, on March 12, 2026, at the age of 89.
