= Don Prince =

American baseball player (1938–2017)

- Pitcher
- Born: April 5, 1938; Clarkton, North Carolina, U.S.
- Died: November 8, 2017 (aged 79); Myrtle Beach, South Carolina, U.S.
- Batted: Right Threw: Right

MLB debut
- September 21, 1962, for the Chicago Cubs

Last MLB appearance
- September 21, 1962, for the Chicago Cubs

MLB statistics
- Win–loss record: 0–0
- Earned run average: 0.00
- Innings pitched: 1
- Stats at Baseball Reference

Teams
- Chicago Cubs (1962)

Donald Mark Prince (April 5, 1938 – November 8, 2017) was an American professional baseball player. He had a seven-year (1958–1964) active career, but appeared in only one inning of one Major League Baseball game for the 1962 Chicago Cubs. He stood 6 feet 4 inches (1.93 m) tall and weighed 200 pounds (91 kg). He attended Campbell University in Buies Creek, North Carolina.

Prince's major league audition came after a mediocre 1962 season with the Cubs' Triple-A Salt Lake City Bees affiliate, where he won 10 of 24 decisions and had a high earned run average of 5.31, largely as a starting pitcher. In his one MLB game, he pitched in relief in the ninth inning of a 4–1 loss to the New York Mets at the Polo Grounds. He walked the first batter he faced, Joe Christopher, then hit the next batter, Frank Thomas. But Jim Hickman got Prince off the hook by grounding into a 1-6-3 double play, and Sammy Drake bounced out to second, ending the inning.

Prince then returned to the minor leagues for the 1963 and 1964 seasons before retiring from baseball.

In 1996, Prince was convicted in a murder-for-hire plot in the Federal District Court in South Carolina. Prince received a 17 1/2-year sentence for attempting to have two people murdered by an undercover police officer he believed to be a hit man.

Prince died in November 8, 2017. He is buried at Hammond Cemetery in Nichols, South Carolina.
