= Dick Bertell =

American baseball player (1935–1999)

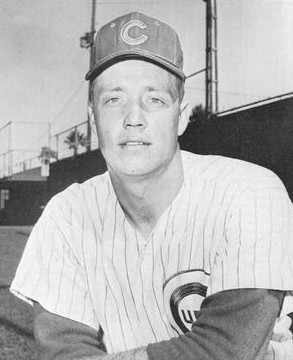
- Catcher
- Born: November 21, 1935; Oak Park, Illinois, U.S.
- Died: December 20, 1999 (aged 64); Mission Viejo, California, U.S.
- Batted: Right Threw: Right

MLB debut
- September 22, 1960, for the Chicago Cubs

Last MLB appearance
- April 12, 1967, for the Chicago Cubs

MLB statistics
- Batting average: .250
- Home runs: 10
- Runs batted in: 112
- Stats at Baseball Reference

Teams
- Chicago Cubs (1960–1965); San Francisco Giants (1965); Chicago Cubs (1967)

Richard George Bertell (November 21, 1935 – December 20, 1999) was an American right-handed professional baseball catcher who played Major League Baseball for the Chicago Cubs and San Francisco Giants from 1960 to 1967. Although he was a light hitter offensively, he had a strong arm, throwing out 47.74% of the base runners who tried steal on him, ranking him fourth on the all-time list.

== Chicago Cubs ==
Bertell was born in Oak Park, Illinois. The Cubs signed him as an undrafted free agent out of Iowa State University in 1957. He made his major league debut with the Cubs in the second game of a doubleheader on September 22, 1960. Though he went hitless, Bertell knocked in a run with a sacrifice fly in his first at-bat. He recorded his first major league hit three days later, singling off Bob Grim of the St. Louis Cardinals. He went 2-for-15 in his first season, knocking in two runs in five games.

Bertell found himself in a platoon role with the Cubs in 1961, seeing the majority of the playing time (92 games) behind the plate for the hapless Cubs. He hit his first major league home run on July 6 off Pittsburgh's Vinegar Bend Mizell, and, overall, had a decent season at the plate for a catcher. Bertell hit .273 with two home runs and 33 RBI. However, his playing time decreased the next season as the Cubs again stumbled to a ninth-place finish in the National League. In 77 games, he posted a career-best batting average of .302 with two home runs and 18 RBIs, and despite playing in fewer than half the team's games, Bertell still played more innings at catcher than anyone else on the 1962 team.

The 1963 season found the Cubs rebounding and posting a winning record for the first time since 1946. Bertell also saw his playing time increase, his third straight season as the club's starting catcher. He led National League catchers in 1963 with a 60.8% baserunners caught stealing percentage, the twelfth highest single-season total in Major League history. Unfortunately, he could not maintain his previous season's batting prowess, dipping to .233 with 2 home runs and 14 RBI. In 1964, Bertell had career best totals of doubles (11), triples (3), home runs (4) and RBIs (35), and had a batting average of .238. He also led National League catchers in throwing out baserunners with 34.

== San Francisco Giants ==
Bertell spent the first two months of the 1965 campaign as the Cubs' starting catcher. He batted .214 with two extra-base hits (both doubles) in 34 games. On May 29, the Cubs traded him along with Len Gabrielson to the San Francisco Giants in exchange for Harvey Kuenn, Ed Bailey, and Bob Hendley. His playing time significantly decreased with the Giants, as he saw action in 22 games over the final four months of the season, hitting .188 as a backup to regular catcher Tom Haller.

Bertell was under contract to San Francisco in 1966 but he did not play in the majors. Just prior to the beginning of the 1967 season, the Giants traded him back to the Cubs for Don Bryant. He played two games with the Cubs, on April 11 and April 12, before being released. His final major league hit was a triple off Hall of Famer Jim Bunning, his first triple since 1964.

== Death ==
Bertell died on December 20, 1999, in Mission Viejo, California.

In 2000, Bertell was inducted into the Iowa State Hall of Fame.
