= Bob Will (baseball) =

American baseball player (1931–2011)

- Outfielder
- Born: July 15, 1931; Berwyn, Illinois, U.S.
- Died: August 11, 2011 (aged 80); Woodstock, Illinois, U.S.
- Batted: Left Threw: Left

MLB debut
- April 16, 1957, for the Chicago Cubs

Last MLB appearance
- June 12, 1963, for the Chicago Cubs

MLB statistics
- Batting average: .247
- Home runs: 9
- Runs batted in: 87
- Stats at Baseball Reference

Teams
- Chicago Cubs (1957–1958, 1960–1963)

Robert Lee Will (July 15, 1931 – August 11, 2011) was an American professional baseball player who played outfield in the Major Leagues between 1957 and 1963 for the Chicago Cubs.

Born in Berwyn, Illinois, Will threw and batted left-handed, stood 5 feet 10 inches (1.78 m) tall and weighed 175 pounds (79 kg). He attended Mankato State University and Northwestern University, and started his pro career in 1954 in the Cubs' farm system. Will had a highly successful career in minor league baseball, hitting .333 lifetime in 934 games. He was the 1959 Most Valuable Player of the Triple-A American Association, a season during which he hit .336 and led the league in hits (203) and runs scored (101).

Will played all or parts of six seasons for the Cubs, seeing his only consistent playing time in 1960, when he appeared in 117 games as the Cubs' regular right fielder. Overall, he appeared in 410 MLB games, and collected 202 hits, batting .247. His professional career ended after the 1964 campaign.

Bob Will died from cancer on August 11, 2011.
