= Daryl Robertson =

American baseball player (1936–2018)

- Shortstop
- Born: January 5, 1936; Cripple Creek, Colorado, U.S.
- Died: July 31, 2018 (aged 82); Salt Lake City, Utah, U.S.
- Batted: Right Threw: Right

MLB debut
- May 4, 1962, for the Chicago Cubs

Last MLB appearance
- May 19, 1962, for the Chicago Cubs

MLB statistics
- Batting average: .105
- Home runs: 0
- Runs batted in: 2
- Stats at Baseball Reference

Teams
- Chicago Cubs (1962)

Daryl Berdene Robertson (January 5, 1936 – July 31, 2018) was an American professional baseball player. The infielder appeared in nine Major League games in May 1962 for the Chicago Cubs. Born in Cripple Creek, Colorado, Robertson attended the University of Utah. He batted and threw right-handed, was 6 feet (1.83 m) tall and weighed 184 pounds (83 kg).

He was signed by the New York Giants as an amateur free agent in 1954 but was acquired by the Milwaukee Braves in the December 1956 minor league draft. He spent four seasons in the Braves' system without reaching the Triple-A level. Then, at the close of spring training in 1961, he was traded to the Cubs with fellow infielder Andre Rodgers for pitchers Moe Drabowsky and Seth Morehead.

Rodgers was the Cubs' starting shortstop in both 1961 and 1962. Most of Robertson's big-league service time came when Rodgers was injured in May 1962. He started five games at shortstop (and one at third base) between May 11–19, and notched two hits in 19 total at bats. Both safeties came on the same day, May 12 against the Philadelphia Phillies at Wrigley Field. The Cubs traded Robertson to the St. Louis Cardinals June 5, but he never appeared in a big-league game for the Redbirds. He spent the rest of the 1962 campaign, his last in baseball, in the minor leagues.

Robertson died July 31, 2018.
