= Jim McAnany =

American baseball player (1936–2015)

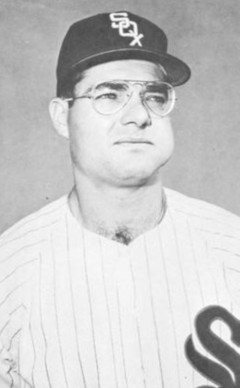
- Right fielder
- Born: September 4, 1936; Los Angeles, California, U.S.
- Died: December 16, 2015 (aged 79); Simi Valley, California, U.S.
- Batted: Right Threw: Right

MLB debut
- September 19, 1958, for the Chicago White Sox

Last MLB appearance
- August 25, 1962, for the Chicago Cubs

MLB statistics
- Batting average: .253
- Home runs: 0
- Runs batted in: 27
- Stats at Baseball Reference

Teams
- Chicago White Sox (1958–1960); Chicago Cubs (1961–1962)

James McAnany (September 4, 1936 – December 16, 2015) was an American professional baseball player. Primarily a right fielder, he played all or part of five seasons in Major League Baseball, from 1958 until 1962, for the Chicago White Sox and Chicago Cubs. He was in the White Sox starting lineup for three of the six games in the 1959 World Series.

The 1959 pennant-winning season was by far his best in the majors. It included 210 of his 241 career at-bats, as McAnany, a contact hitter with little power, batted .276 for the White Sox with no home runs but just 26 strikeouts.

A native of Los Angeles, he attended Loyola High School and the University of Southern California there. He made his professional debut in 1955 with the Waterloo White Hawks.

Called up to the majors in late 1958, McAnany made his MLB debut on September 19, 1958 in Kansas City, pinch-hitting for White Sox pitcher Early Wynn in the fifth inning. He struck out against Ralph Terry and ended up a hitless 0-for-13 for the '58 season. He then had his breakout season in 1959, becoming an integral part of a Sox team that captured the American League pennant for the first time since 1919.

After the Sox won Game 1 of the World Series with the Los Angeles Dodgers 11–0, McAnany started in right field for Game 2 against Dodger left-handed pitcher Johnny Podres. He went 0-for-3 as the Sox, after taking a 2–0 lead, lost the game 4–3.

In baseball's 1960 expansion draft, the new Los Angeles Angels franchise claimed McAnany with the 49th pick. He was then traded on April 1, 1961 to the Chicago Cubs in exchange for Lou Johnson. Hampered by injury, he had 16 at-bats as a Cub and 12 in the minors before retiring in 1963.

McAnany was mentioned in Jane Leavy's 2010 book The Last Boy: Mickey Mantle. In it is a story in which McAnany was hit by a Mickey Mantle line drive during the 1959 season and stated, "I think I have a hole in my chest."

According to a Chicago Tribune column of Oct. 21, 2005 by Mike Downey, McAnany, employed by an insurance agency in Southern California, returned to Chicago to participate in a "Turn Back the Clock" weekend sponsored by the White Sox in June 2005 when the Los Angeles Dodgers played at Comiskey Park for the first time since the '59 World Series. Four months later, the White Sox would return to the World Series for the first time in 46 years.

McAnany died December 16, 2015.
