= Elder White =

American baseball player (1933–2010)

- Shortstop
- Born: December 23, 1933; Colerain, North Carolina, U.S.
- Died: November 26, 2010 (aged 76); Ahoskie, North Carolina, U.S.
- Batted: Right Threw: Right

MLB debut
- April 10, 1962, for the Chicago Cubs

Last MLB appearance
- June 3, 1962, for the Chicago Cubs

MLB statistics
- Batting average: .151
- Home runs: 0
- Runs batted in: 1
- Stats at Baseball Reference

Teams
- Chicago Cubs (1962)

Elder Lafayette White (December 23, 1933 – November 26, 2010) was an American professional baseball player who played 23 games (primarily as a shortstop) in the Major Leagues in 1962 for the Chicago Cubs. Born in Colerain, North Carolina, he attended Chowan College. He stood 5 feet 11 inches (1.80 m) tall, weighed 165 pounds (75 kg), and threw and batted right-handed.

White began the 1962 season on the Cubs' roster, and he started nine games at shortstop during the month of April, batting only .158 during the month. He later appeared in seven more games, starting five at shortstop, late in May and in early June. Altogether, he collected eight hits in the Majors, including two doubles, and stole three bases. He played 12 seasons of minor league baseball (1952; 1955–1965), with his most successful year also coming in 1962, when he batted .301 with 11 home runs for the Double-A San Antonio Missions.
