= Billy Ott =

American baseball player (1940–2015)

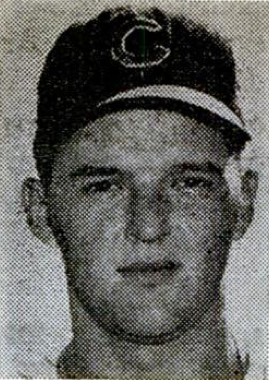
- Ott in 1963
- Right fielder
- Born: November 23, 1940; New York, New York, U.S.
- Died: February 18, 2015 (aged 74); Haverstraw, New York, U.S.
- Batted: Switch Threw: Right

MLB debut
- September 4, 1962, for the Chicago Cubs

Last MLB appearance
- July 14, 1964, for the Chicago Cubs

MLB statistics
- Batting average: .164
- Home runs: 1
- Runs batted in: 3
- Stats at Baseball Reference

Teams
- Chicago Cubs (1962, 1964)

William Joseph Ott (November 23, 1940 – February 18, 2015) was an American professional baseball player, an outfielder whose six-season (1960–1965) career included stints with the 1962 and 1964 Chicago Cubs of Major League Baseball. A switch hitter who threw right-handed, Ott stood 6 feet 1 inch (1.85 m) tall and weighed 180 pounds (82 kg) in his playing days. He signed with the Cubs after graduating from Cardinal Hayes High School in the Bronx and attending St. John's University.

Ott earned a late-season recall to Chicago after his best minor league campaign, when he hit 23 home runs and compiled 88 runs batted in for the 1962 San Antonio Missions of the Double-A Texas League. He appeared in 12 games and on September 17 he hit his only Major League home run, a solo shot off Ray Washburn of the St. Louis Cardinals. In 1964, he was called up from the Triple-A Salt Lake City Bees in June and was the immediate successor to Lou Brock as the Cubs' starting right fielder on June 16. Brock had been traded to the Cardinals a day earlier in what would come to be considered as one of the more one-sided transactions in MLB annals. Ott collected one hit, a double, off left-hander Dennis Bennett of the Philadelphia Phillies on the day. He would start four more times in right field during the next week, but registered only four hits in 22 at bats during that time, and he returned to the minor leagues after his final Cub appearance in mid-July.

All told, Ott played in 32 Major League games and batted 67 times, with 11 hits. Upon leaving baseball, he became a police officer and a professional locksmith in his native New York City.
