= Jack Warner (pitcher) =

American baseball player (born 1940)

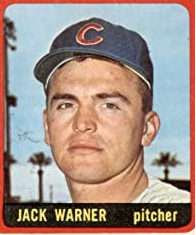
- Pitcher
- Born: July 12, 1940 (age 86); Brandywine, West Virginia, U.S.
- Batted: Right Threw: Right

MLB debut
- April 10, 1962, for the Chicago Cubs

Last MLB appearance
- June 27, 1965, for the Chicago Cubs

MLB statistics
- Win–loss record: 0–2
- Strikeouts: 23
- Earned run average: 5.10
- Stats at Baseball Reference

Teams
- Chicago Cubs (1962–65)

Jack Dyer Warner (born July 12, 1940) is an American former Major League Baseball relief pitcher. The native of Brandywine, West Virginia, had a nine-season professional baseball career. He threw and batted right-handed and was listed as 5 feet 11 inches (1.80 m) tall and 190 pounds (86 kg).

== Career ==
Warner was signed by the Chicago Cubs as an amateur free agent in 1958 after graduation from Alliance (Ohio) High School. He appeared in parts of four MLB seasons for the Cubs from 1962 to 1965. He pitched in a total of 33 games for Chicago, with a career record of 0–2, 542/3innings pitched, 23 strikeouts, 13 games finished, no saves, and an ERA of 5.10.

Perhaps his best game was one in which he was the losing pitcher. This took place in the second game of a doubleheader at Forbes Field on July 21, 1963. Warner pitched scoreless ball in the bottom of the 11th, 12th, and 13th innings against the Pittsburgh Pirates, but gave up a run with two out in the bottom of the 14th for a 6–5 loss. Warner also achieved his only major league hit in this game, a single in the top of the 14th against eventual winning pitcher Don Cardwell.

== Trivia ==
- Warner held All-Stars Leo Cárdenas, Tim McCarver, Denis Menke, and Bob Skinner to a .077 collective batting average. (1-for-13)
