= Morrie Steevens =

American baseball player (born 1940)

- Pitcher
- Born: October 7, 1940; Salem, Illinois, U.S.
- Died: June 16, 2024 (aged 83); San Antonio, Texas, U.S.
- Batted: Left Threw: Left

MLB debut
- April 13, 1962, for the Chicago Cubs

Last MLB appearance
- September 18, 1965, for the Philadelphia Phillies

MLB statistics
- Win–loss record: 0–2
- Earned run average: 4.43
- Strikeouts: 11
- Stats at Baseball Reference

Teams
- Chicago Cubs (1962); Philadelphia Phillies (1964–1965)

Morris Dale Steevens (October 7, 1940 – June 16, 2024) was an American professional baseball left-handed pitcher, who played in Major League Baseball (MLB) for the Chicago Cubs (1962) and Philadelphia Phillies (1964–1965). During his playing days, Steevens stood 6 feet 2 inches (1.88 m) tall, weighing 175 pounds (79 kg).

== Baseball career ==
Morrie attended Salem High School in Salem, Illinois, where he earned varsity letters in baseball, basketball, football, and track. He was signed as a undrafted free agent by the Chicago Cubs in 1958.

Steevens began his 10-year pro career as a 17-year-old at with the Class D Pulaski Cubs in 1958. In the minors he made the All-Star team in 1959 pitching for the Class D Paris Lakers and in 1960 with the Class C St. Cloud Rox. He pitched a no-hitter, as well, in 1960 for the Rox against the Minot Mallards.

After going 11-6 with a 3.35 ERA for the Double-A San Antonio Missions in 1961 and making a third-straight All-Star appearance, Steevens made the Cubs' 28-man early-season roster out of spring training in 1962. He went unscored upon in four April relief appearances (covering 31/3 innings pitched) before being sent back to San Antonio, where he won 15 games. The Cubs recalled Steevens in September and used him in eight games, including his only big-league starting assignment. On September 19 he went 32/3 innings against the Phillies at Connie Mack Stadium, permitting four earned runs, and picking up the loss in a game shortened by rain. Those were the only runs allowed by the rookie Steevens in 15 innings pitched for the 1962 Cubs.

Steevens spent all of 1963 back in the minor leagues and was traded to the Phillies, during the off-season. After a sparkling 8–1 season with the Triple-A Arkansas Travelers, he was recalled by the first-place Phils as an extra bullpen arm for the stretch drive. In his first relief appearance, on September 19, 1964 (two years to the day after his only MLB start), Steevens came into a 3–3 road game against the Los Angeles Dodgers in the bottom of the 16th inning in relief of Jack Baldschun to face left-handed-hitting Ron Fairly with runners at second and third base and two outs. But before he could retire Fairly, Willie Davis, the runner at third, stole home, to give the Dodgers a 4–3 victory. The Phillies recovered to win the next game, but then dropped ten games in a row to fall from the National League (NL) lead and finish second to the St. Louis Cardinals. Steevens appeared in three more games during the catastrophic losing streak, allowing one earned run in 22/3 innings pitched.

Morris then split 1965 between Triple-A and the Phils, and appeared in six more big-league games. He posted a poor 16.88 earned run average (ERA), again in only 22/3 innings of work. Morris then spent 1966 and 1967 back in the minors before deciding to retire from the game.

All told, Steevens lost his only two MLB decisions. In 22 games and 201/3 innings pitched, he gave up 20 hits and 16 bases on balls. He struck out 11 batters. Interestingly, he only pitched in April and September in the Major Leagues.

== Personal life ==
After baseball, Steevens lived in San Antonio. He died on June 16, 2024.
