= Freddie Burdette =

American baseball player (1936–2010)

- Pitcher
- Born: September 15, 1936; Moultrie, Georgia, U.S.
- Died: June 1, 2010 (aged 73); Albany, Georgia, U.S.
- Batted: Right Threw: Right

MLB debut
- September 5, 1962, for the Chicago Cubs

Last MLB appearance
- October 3, 1964, for the Chicago Cubs

MLB statistics
- Win–loss record: 1–0
- Earned run average: 3.41
- Strikeouts: 10
- Stats at Baseball Reference

Teams
- Chicago Cubs (1962–1964)

Freddie Thomason Burdette (September 15, 1936 – June 1, 2010) was an American right-handed pitcher in Major League Baseball for the Chicago Cubs. Born in Moultrie, Georgia, he batted right-handed and was listed as 6 feet 1 inch (1.85 m) tall and 170 pounds (77 kg).

Burdette was signed by the Cubs on June 3, 1954, as an undrafted amateur free agent. He battled his way through the minor leagues before finally making his major-league debut at age 25, pitching in relief in both games of a doubleheader with the Cincinnati Reds at Crosley Field. He induced the first batter he ever faced, Leo Cárdenas, to ground out to second baseman Ken Hubbs. He also retired Gordy Coleman on a groundout before being removed from the game. In the nightcap, Burdette pitched a full inning, allowing a hit but no runs. On September 10, he tallied his first big-league strikeout, fanning slugger Frank Howard. He also earned his first (and only) career save when he finished a 4–1 victory over Philadelphia on September 20. Burdette went on to finish the year with a 3.72 ERA in 9 2/3 innings over 8 games. The next year, he was a late-season call-up from the minors for the Cubs, appearing in four games as a reliever and posting a 3.86 ERA.

Burdette saw his most extensive major-league action in 1964, making 18 appearances out of the bullpen after getting promoted to the big leagues in June. He earned his first major-league win (and only decision) on August 18 against the Phillies in a marathon 16-inning contest at Connie Mack Stadium. Burdette retired six of the seven Phillie batters he faced in the 14th and 15th innings before being removed for a pinch-hitter as the Cubs rallied for two runs in the top of the 16th. Ernie Broglio (famously acquired by the Cubs in exchange for legend Lou Brock) allowed a solo homer in the bottom of the 16th to Clay Dalrymple but held on to save Burdette's only career win.

Burdette pitched in eight more games as a Cub in 1964, including his final appearance on October 2, 1964, against the San Francisco Giants. He hurled two-thirds of an inning, retiring opposing pitcher Bobby Bolin to end the final inning Burdett would pitch in the bigs.

For his career, Burdette was 1–0 in 30 games (all in relief) with one save and a 3.41 ERA. In 341/3 innings pitched, he permitted 27 hits, 20 bases on balls and 13 earned runs.

== Later life ==
Following his baseball career, Burdette worked for the United Parcel Service. He died on June 1, 2010, in Albany, Georgia, where he had resided since 1955.
