= Danny Murphy (pitcher) =

American baseball player (born 1942)

- Pitcher / Outfielder
- Born: August 23, 1942 (age 83); Beverly, Massachusetts, U.S.
- Batted: Left Threw: Right

MLB debut
- June 18, 1960, for the Chicago Cubs

Last MLB appearance
- October 1, 1970, for the Chicago White Sox

MLB statistics
- Win–loss record: 4–4
- Earned run average: 4.66
- Strikeouts: 58
- Batting average: .177
- Home runs: 4
- Runs batted in: 13
- Stats at Baseball Reference

Teams
- Chicago Cubs (1960–1962); Chicago White Sox (1969–1970)

Daniel Francis Murphy (born August 23, 1942) is an American former professional baseball player who played pitcher and outfielder in the Major Leagues from 1960 to 1962 and in 1969–1970 for the Chicago Cubs and Chicago White Sox. Murphy threw right-handed, batted left-handed, stood 5 feet 11 inches (1.80 m) tall and weighed 185 pounds (84 kg) during his playing career.

A native of Beverly, Massachusetts, Murphy signed with the Cubs for a $100,000 bonus as an outfielder on June 15, 1960, following his graduation from St. John's Preparatory School after an illustrious career in youth and schoolboy baseball. Three days later, he made his professional and Major League debut as the Cubs' starting center fielder in a game against the Cincinnati Reds at Crosley Field. He went hitless in four at bats against Jay Hook, but the following day, he took over from the Cubs' regular center fielder, Richie Ashburn, late in the game and collected his first MLB hit, a single against left-handed relief pitcher Bill Henry. He became the youngest Cub to hit a home run at the age of 18 years, three weeks, when he connected on September 13, 1960, off the Reds' Bob Purkey with two runners on base. However, Murphy would collect only 23 total hits in 49 games played during his Cub career, batting only .171 during his tenure. He was traded to the Houston Colt .45s during spring training in 1963.

Murphy then disappeared into minor league baseball for the next six full seasons, converting to pitcher in 1966 at the Double-A level in the White Sox' organization. After promising campaigns in the Southern and Pacific Coast leagues, the White Sox recalled Murphy in August 1969, and he debuted as a relief pitcher against the Boston Red Sox at Comiskey Park on August 11. He had a successful two months coming out of the White Sox bullpen, compiling a low 2.01 earned run average with four saves. Murphy then spent the entire 1970 campaign with Chicago, with markedly less impressive results. His ERA rose to 5.69 and he yielded 82 hits and 49 bases on balls in 80 2/3 innings pitched—although Murphy connected for his fourth and final career home run off Bill Zepp in a winning effort against the Minnesota Twins on June 28. All told, he appeared as a pitcher in 68 games played and 112 innings, and gave up 100 hits and 59 bases on balls, with 58 strikeouts and nine saves as a Major Leaguer.

The following spring, Murphy was traded to his hometown Red Sox. He spent the 1971 season at Boston's Triple-A Louisville Colonels affiliate before leaving baseball after 12 professional seasons.
