= Cuno Barragan =

American baseball player (1932–2024)

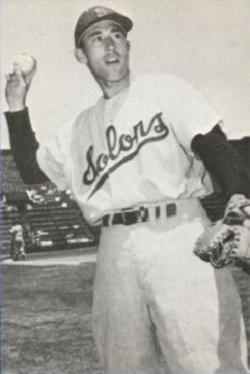
- Catcher
- Born: June 20, 1932; Sacramento, California, U.S.
- Died: May 12, 2024 (aged 91); Placer County, California, U.S.
- Batted: Right Threw: Right

MLB debut
- September 1, 1961, for the Chicago Cubs

Last MLB appearance
- April 21, 1963, for the Chicago Cubs

MLB statistics
- Batting average: .202
- Hits: 33
- Home runs: 1
- Stats at Baseball Reference

Teams
- Chicago Cubs (1961–1963)

Facundo Anthony "Cuno" Barragan (June 20, 1932 – May 12, 2024) was an American professional baseball player. He was a catcher in Major League Baseball for the Chicago Cubs from 1961 to 1963. Barragan, born in Sacramento, California, threw and batted right-handed, stood 5 feet 11 inches (1.80 m) tall and weighed 180 pounds (82 kg). He attended Sacramento City College and California State University, Sacramento.

== Career ==
Cuno Barragan's only MLB home run came on his very first big-league at-bat, on September 1, 1961, off left-hander Dick LeMay; 5,427 people witnessed this event, which came early in a 14-inning loss by the Cubs to the Giants at Wrigley Field on a Friday afternoon.

All told, Barragan collected 33 career hits in the majors, with six doubles and a triple, with 14 runs batted in in 69 games played. He batted .202.

== Personal life ==
His Hispanic given name and its unique nickname, combined with his cup-of-coffee career, led the authors of The Great American Baseball Card Flipping, Trading and Bubble Gum Book to make the following sarcastic comment next to the illustration of his Topps baseball card: "Who the hell is Cuno Barragan? And why are they saying those terrible things about him?"

In 1973, Barragan was inducted into the Mexican American Hall of Fame, an organization which honors individuals from the Sacramento area. In 2002, he was elected to the Sacramento City College Hall of Fame for baseball and football.

Barragan died from heart failure in Placer County, California, on May 12, 2024, at the age of 91.

== See also ==
- List of Major League Baseball players with a home run in their first major league at bat
