= 1975 Chicago Cubs season =

1975 Chicago Cubs
- League: National League
- Division: East
- Ballpark: Wrigley Field
- City: Chicago
- Record: 75–87 (.463)
- Divisional place: 5th
- Owners: Philip K. Wrigley
- General managers: John Holland
- Managers: Jim Marshall
- Television: WGN-TV (Jack Brickhouse, Jim West)
- Radio: WGN (Vince Lloyd, Lou Boudreau)
- Stats: ESPN.com; Baseball Reference

The 1975 Chicago Cubs season was the 104th season of the Chicago Cubs franchise, the 100th in the National League and the 60th at Wrigley Field. The Cubs finished fifth in the National League East with a record of 75–87.

== Offseason ==
- October 23, 1974: Billy Williams was traded by the Cubs to the Oakland Athletics for Manny Trillo, Darold Knowles and Bob Locker.
- December 2, 1974: Tim Hosley was selected by the Cubs from the Oakland Athletics in the rule 5 draft.
- December 13, 1974: Carmen Fanzone was released by the Cubs.
- January 9, 1975: Ed Putman was drafted by the Cubs in the 1st round (3rd pick) of the 1975 Major League Baseball draft (secondary phase).

== Regular season ==
- April 25, 1975: Rick Reuschel had three putouts in one inning for the Cubs.

=== Season standings ===
NL East
Team	W	L	Pct.	GB	Home	Road
Pittsburgh Pirates	92	69	.571	—	52‍–‍28	40‍–‍41
Philadelphia Phillies	86	76	.531	6½	51‍–‍30	35‍–‍46
New York Mets	82	80	.506	10½	42‍–‍39	40‍–‍41
St. Louis Cardinals	82	80	.506	10½	45‍–‍36	37‍–‍44
Chicago Cubs	75	87	.463	17½	42‍–‍39	33‍–‍48
Montreal Expos	75	87	.463	17½	39‍–‍42	36‍–‍45

=== Record vs. opponents ===
1975 National League record Sources:
Team	ATL	CHC	CIN	HOU	LAD	MON	NYM	PHI	PIT	SD	SF	STL
Atlanta	—	5–7	3–15	12–6	8–10	8–4	4–8	5–7	4–8	7–11	8–9	3–9
Chicago	7–5	—	1–11	7–5	5–7	9–9	7–11	12–6	6–12	5–7	5–7	11–7
Cincinnati	15–3	11–1	—	13–5	8–10	8–4	8–4	7–5	6–6	11–7	13–5	8–4
Houston	6–12	5–7	5–13	—	6–12	8–4	4–8	6–6	6–5	9–9	5–13	4–8–1
Los Angeles	10–8	7–5	10–8	12–6	—	5–7	6–6	7–5	5–7	11–7	10–8	5–7
Montreal	4–8	9–9	4–8	4–8	7–5	—	10–8	7–11	7–11	7–5	5–7	11–7
New York	8–4	11–7	4–8	8–4	6–6	8–10	—	7–11	5–13	8–4	8–4	9–9
Philadelphia	7-5	6–12	5–7	6–6	5–7	11–7	11–7	—	11–7	7–5	7–5	10–8
Pittsburgh	8–4	12–6	6–6	5–6	7–5	11–7	13–5	7–11	—	8–4	5–7	10–8
San Diego	11–7	7–5	7–11	9–9	7–11	5–7	4–8	5–7	4–8	—	8–10	4–8
San Francisco	9–8	7–5	5–13	13–5	8–10	7–5	4–8	5–7	7–5	10–8	—	5–7
St. Louis	9–3	7–11	4–8	8–4–1	7–5	7–11	9–9	8–10	8–10	8–4	7–5	—

=== Notable transactions ===
- April 6, 1975: Jim Todd was traded by the Cubs to the Oakland Athletics for a player to be named later and cash. The Athletics completed the deal by sending Champ Summers to the Cubs on April 29.
- May 2, 1975: Burt Hooton was traded by the Cubs to the Los Angeles Dodgers for Geoff Zahn and Eddie Solomon.
- June 3, 1975: Lee Smith was drafted by the Cubs in the 2nd round of the 1975 amateur draft. Player signed June 20, 1975.
- July 22, 1975: Eddie Solomon was traded by the Cubs to the St. Louis Cardinals for Ken Crosby.

=== Roster ===
1975 Chicago Cubs
Roster
Pitchers: 33 Bill Bonham; 34 Ray Burris; 39 Ken Crosby; 32 Tom Dettore; 47 Ken Frailing; 44 Burt Hooton; 32 Darold Knowles; 36 Bob Locker; 49 Donnie Moore; 37 Willie Prall; 43 Paul Reuschel; 48 Rick Reuschel; 35 Buddy Schultz; 40 Eddie Solomon; 30 Steve Stone; 39 Eddie Watt; 42 Milt Wilcox; 38 Geoff Zahn; 45 Oscar Zamora	Catchers: 6 Tim Hosley; 15 George Mitterwald; 9 Steve Swisher; Infielders: 22 Ron Dunn; 28 Adrian Garrett; 11 Don Kessinger; 23 Pete LaCock; 18 Bill Madlock; 17 Dave Rosello; 16 Rob Sperring; 12 Andre Thornton; 19 Manny Trillo	Outfielders: 1 José Cardenal; 4 Vic Harris; 21 Gene Hiser; 7 Rick Monday; 24 Jerry Morales; 27 Champ Summers; 27 Jim Tyrone; 28 Joe Wallis	Manager: 25 Jim Marshall; Coaches: 3 Jack Bloomfield; 46 Marv Grissom; 5 Irv Noren; 2 Jim Saul

== Player stats ==
= Indicates team leader

= Indicates league leader

=== Batting ===
==== Starters by position ====
Note: Pos = Position; G = Games played; AB = At bats; H = Hits; Avg. = Batting average; HR = Home runs; RBI = Runs batted in

Pos	Player	G	AB	H	Avg.	HR	RBI
C	Steve Swisher	93	254	54	.213	1	22
1B	Andre Thornton	120	372	109	.293	18	60
2B	Manny Trillo	154	545	135	.248	7	70
SS	Don Kessinger	154	601	146	.243	0	46
3B	Bill Madlock	130	514	182	.354	7	64
LF	José Cardenal	154	574	182	.317	9	68
CF	Rick Monday	136	491	131	.267	17	60
RF	Jerry Morales	153	578	156	.270	12	91

==== Other batters ====
Note: G = Games played; AB = At bats; H = Hits; Avg. = Batting average; HR = Home runs; RBI = Runs batted in

Player	G	AB	H	Avg.	HR	RBI
Pete LaCock	106	249	57	.229	6	30
George Mitterwald	84	200	44	.220	5	26
Rob Sperring	65	144	30	.208	1	9
Tim Hosley	62	141	36	.255	6	20
Champ Summers	76	91	21	.231	1	16
Gene Hiser	45	62	15	.242	0	6
Dave Rosello	19	58	15	.259	1	8
Vic Harris	51	56	10	.179	0	5
Joe Wallis	16	56	16	.286	1	4
Ron Dunn	32	44	7	.159	1	6
Jim Tyrone	11	22	5	.227	0	3
Adrian Garrett	16	21	2	.095	1	6

=== Pitching ===
==== Starting pitchers ====
Note: G = Games pitched; IP = Innings pitched; W = Wins; L = Losses; ERA = Earned run average; SO = Strikeouts

Player	G	IP	W	L	ERA	SO
Ray Burris	36	238.1	15	10	4.12	108
Rick Reuschel	38	234.0	11	17	3.73	155
Bill Bonham	38	229.1	13	15	4.71	165
Steve Stone	33	214.1	12	8	3.95	139
Willie Prall	3	14.2	0	2	8.59	7
Burt Hooton	3	11.0	0	2	8.18	5

==== Other pitchers ====
Note: G = Games pitched; IP = Innings pitched; W = Wins; L = Losses; ERA = Earned run average; SO = Strikeouts

Player	G	IP	W	L	ERA	SO
Tom Dettore	36	85.1	5	4	5.38	46
Geoff Zahn	16	62.2	2	7	4.45	21
Donnie Moore	4	8.2	0	0	4.15	8

==== Relief pitchers ====
Note: G = Games pitched; W = Wins; L = Losses; SV = Saves; ERA = Earned run average; SO = Strikeouts

Player	G	W	L	SV	ERA	SO
Darold Knowles	58	6	9	15	5.81	63
Oscar Zamora	52	5	2	10	5.07	28
Ken Frailing	41	2	5	1	5.43	39
Paul Reuschel	28	1	3	5	3.50	12
Milt Wilcox	25	0	1	0	5.63	21
Bob Locker	22	0	1	0	4.96	14
Ken Crosby	9	1	0	0	3.24	6
Eddie Solomon	6	0	0	0	1.35	3
Eddie Watt	6	0	1	0	13.50	6
Buddy Schultz	6	2	0	0	6.35	4

== Farm system ==
Level	Team	League	Manager
AAA	Wichita Aeros	American Association	Mike Roarke
AA	Midland Cubs	Texas League	Doc Edwards
A	Key West Conchs	Florida State League	Walt Dixon
Rookie	GCL Cubs	Gulf Coast League	Jack Hiatt

LEAGUE CO-CHAMPIONS: Midland
