= 1976 Chicago Cubs season =

1976 Chicago Cubs
- League: National League
- Division: East
- Ballpark: Wrigley Field
- City: Chicago
- Record: 75–87 (.463)
- Divisional place: 4th
- Owners: Philip K. Wrigley
- General managers: Salty Saltwell
- Managers: Jim Marshall
- Television: WGN-TV (Jack Brickhouse, Jim West)
- Radio: WGN (Vince Lloyd, Lou Boudreau)
- Stats: ESPN.com; Baseball Reference

The 1976 Chicago Cubs season was the 105th season of the Chicago Cubs franchise, the 101st in the National League and the 61st at Wrigley Field. The Cubs finished fourth in the National League East with a record of 75–87.

== Offseason ==
- October 28, 1975: Don Kessinger was traded by the Cubs to the St. Louis Cardinals for Mike Garman and a player to be named later. The Cardinals completed the deal by sending Bobby Hrapmann (minors) to the Cubs on April 5, 1976.
- December 22, 1975, Vic Harris was traded by the Cubs to the St. Louis Cardinals for Mick Kelleher.

== Regular season ==
- April 17, 1976: Mike Schmidt of the Philadelphia Phillies hit four consecutive home runs in one game against the Cubs. In the game, the Phillies and Cubs combined for thirty-four runs in a game which featured nine home runs. The Cubs had blown a 13–2 lead at Wrigley, losing to the Phillies 18–16 when Schmidt hit his fourth home run in the 10th inning.
- April 25, 1976: In the fourth inning of a game against the Los Angeles Dodgers at Dodger Stadium, Cubs outfielder Rick Monday noticed two protesters kneeling on the grass in left-center field, with the apparent intention of burning an American flag. He grabbed the flag and brought it to the bullpen. The crowd at Dodger fans started singing "God Bless America" while the fans were escorted out of the stadium. Monday was later presented with the flag in a ceremony at Wrigley Field by Dodgers executive Al Campanis. In the 2000s, the Baseball Hall of Fame recently named Monday's act as one of the 100 Classic Moments in the history of the game.

=== Season standings ===
NL East
Team	W	L	Pct.	GB	Home	Road
Philadelphia Phillies	101	61	.623	—	53‍–‍28	48‍–‍33
Pittsburgh Pirates	92	70	.568	9	47‍–‍34	45‍–‍36
New York Mets	86	76	.531	15	45‍–‍37	41‍–‍39
Chicago Cubs	75	87	.463	26	42‍–‍39	33‍–‍48
St. Louis Cardinals	72	90	.444	29	37‍–‍44	35‍–‍46
Montreal Expos	55	107	.340	46	27‍–‍53	28‍–‍54

=== Record vs. opponents ===
1976 National League record Sources:
Team	ATL	CHC	CIN	HOU	LAD	MON	NYM	PHI	PIT	SD	SF	STL
Atlanta	—	6–6	6–12	7–11	8–10	8–4	4–8	5–7	3–9	10–8	9–9	4–8
Chicago	6–6	—	3–9	5–7	3–9	11–7	5–13	8–10	8–10	6–6	8–4	12–6
Cincinnati	12–6	9–3	—	12–6	13–5	9–3	6–6	5–7	8–4	13–5	9–9	6–6
Houston	11–7	7–5	6–12	—	5–13	10–2	6–6	4–8	2–10	10–8	10–8	9–3
Los Angeles	10–8	9–3	5–13	13–5	—	10–2	7–5	5–7	9–3	6–12	8–10	10–2
Montreal	4–8	7–11	3–9	2–10	2–10	—	8–10	3–15	8–10	4–8	7–5	7–11
New York	8–4	13–5	6–6	6–6	5–7	10–8	—	5–13	10–8	7–5	7–5	9–9
Philadelphia	7-5	10–8	7–5	8–4	7–5	15–3	13–5	—	8–10	8–4	6–6	12–6
Pittsburgh	9–3	10–8	4–8	10–2	3–9	10–8	8–10	10–8	—	7–5	9–3	12–6
San Diego	8–10	6–6	5–13	8–10	12–6	8–4	5–7	4–8	5–7	—	8–10	4–8
San Francisco	9–9	4–8	9–9	8–10	10–8	5–7	5–7	6–6	3–9	10–8	—	5–7
St. Louis	8–4	6–12	6–6	3–9	2–10	11–7	9–9	6–12	6–12	8–4	7–5	—

=== Notable transactions ===
- April 19, 1976: Tim Hosley was selected off waivers from the Cubs by the Oakland Athletics.
- April 22, 1976: Tom Dettore was released by the Cubs.
- May 17, 1976: Andre Thornton was traded by the Cubs to the Montreal Expos for Steve Renko and Larry Biittner.
- June 8, 1976: Joe Coleman was purchased by the Cubs from the Detroit Tigers.
- June 8, 1976: Keith Drumright was drafted by the Cubs in the 4th round of the 1976 Major League Baseball draft.
- September 8, 1976: Ramón Hernández was purchased by the Cubs from the Pittsburgh Pirates.

=== Roster ===
1976 Chicago Cubs
Roster
Pitchers: 33 Bill Bonham; 34 Ray Burris; 31 Joe Coleman; 39 Ken Crosby; 31 Tom Dettore; 47 Ken Frailing; 44 Mike Garman; 36 Ramón Hernández; 32 Darold Knowles; 40 Mike Krukow; 50 Steve Renko; 43 Paul Reuschel; 48 Rick Reuschel; 35 Buddy Schultz; 30 Steve Stone; 42 Bruce Sutter; 38 Geoff Zahn; 45 Oscar Zamora	Catchers: 6 Tim Hosley; 15 George Mitterwald; 8 Ed Putman; 9 Steve Swisher; Infielders: 26 Larry Biittner; 20 Mick Kelleher; 23 Pete LaCock; 18 Bill Madlock; 17 Dave Rosello; 16 Rob Sperring; 12 Jerry Tabb; 12 Andre Thornton; 19 Manny Trillo	Outfielders: 21 Mike Adams; 1 José Cardenal; 7 Rick Monday; 24 Jerry Morales; 27 Champ Summers; 22 Wayne Tyrone; 28 Joe Wallis; Other batters: 6 Tim Hosley	Manager: 25 Jim Marshall; Coaches: 3 Jack Bloomfield; 4 Harry Dunlop; 46 Marv Grissom; 2 Jim Saul

== Player stats ==
= Indicates team leader

= Indicates league leader

=== Batting ===
==== Starters by position ====
Note: Pos = Position; G = Games played; AB = At bats; H = Hits; Avg. = Batting average; HR = Home runs; RBI = Runs batted in

Pos	Player	G	AB	H	Avg.	HR	RBI
C	Steve Swisher	109	377	89	.236	5	42
1B	Pete LaCock	106	244	54	.221	8	28
2B	Manny Trillo	158	582	139	.239	4	59
SS	Mick Kelleher	124	337	77	.228	0	22
3B	Bill Madlock	142	514	174	.339	15	84
LF	José Cardenal	136	521	156	.299	8	47
CF	Rick Monday	137	534	145	.272	32	77
RF	Jerry Morales	140	537	147	.274	16	67

==== Other batters ====
Note: G = Games played; AB = At bats; H = Hits; Avg. = Batting average; HR = Home runs; RBI = Runs batted in

Player	G	AB	H	Avg.	HR	RBI
Joe Wallis	121	338	86	.254	5	21
George Mitterwald	101	303	65	.215	5	28
Dave Rosello	91	227	55	.242	1	11
Larry Biittner	78	192	47	.245	0	17
Champ Summers	83	126	26	.206	3	13
Rob Sperring	43	93	24	.258	0	7
Andre Thornton	27	85	17	.200	2	14
Wayne Tyrone	30	57	13	.228	1	8
Mike Adams	25	29	4	.138	0	2
Jerry Tabb	11	24	7	.292	0	0
Randy Hundley	13	18	3	.167	0	1
Ed Putman	5	7	3	.429	0	0
Tim Hosley	1	1	0	.000	0	0

=== Pitching ===
==== Starting pitchers ====
Note: G = Games pitched; IP = Innings pitched; W = Wins; L = Losses; ERA = Earned run average; SO = Strikeouts

Player	G	IP	W	L	ERA	SO
Rick Reuschel	38	260.0	14	12	3.46	146
Ray Burris	37	249.0	15	13	3.11	112
Bill Bonham	32	196.0	9	13	4.27	110
Steve Renko	28	163.1	8	11	3.86	112
Steve Stone	17	75.0	3	6	4.08	33

==== Other pitchers ====
Note: G = Games pitched; IP = Innings pitched; W = Wins; L = Losses; ERA = Earned run average; SO = Strikeouts

Player	G	IP	W	L	ERA	SO
Ken Frailing	6	18.2	1	2	2.41	10
Ken Crosby	7	12.0	0	0	12.00	5
Geoff Zahn	3	8.1	0	1	10.80	4

==== Relief pitchers ====
Note: G = Games pitched; W = Wins; L = Losses; SV = Saves; ERA = Earned run average; SO = Strikeouts

Player	G	W	L	SV	ERA	SO
Bruce Sutter	52	6	3	10	2.70	73
Darold Knowles	58	5	7	9	2.89	39
Paul Reuschel	50	4	2	3	4.55	55
Mike Garman	47	2	4	1	4.95	37
Oscar Zamora	40	5	3	3	5.24	27
Joe Coleman	39	2	8	4	4.10	66
Buddy Schultz	29	1	1	2	6.08	15
Tom Dettore	4	0	1	0	10.29	4
Mike Krukow	2	0	0	0	8.31	1
Ramón Hernández	2	0	0	0	0.00	1

== Farm system ==
Level	Team	League	Manager
AAA	Wichita Aeros	American Association	Doc Edwards
AA	Midland Cubs	Texas League	Dennis Sommers
A	Pompano Beach Cubs	Florida State League	Jack Hiatt
Rookie	GCL Cubs	Gulf Coast League	Walt Dixon
