= 1974 Chicago Cubs season =

1974 Chicago Cubs
- League: National League
- Division: East
- Ballpark: Wrigley Field
- City: Chicago
- Record: 66–96 (.407)
- Divisional place: 6th
- Owners: Philip K. Wrigley
- General managers: John Holland
- Managers: Whitey Lockman, Jim Marshall
- Television: WGN-TV (Jack Brickhouse, Jim West)
- Radio: WGN (Vince Lloyd, Lou Boudreau)
- Stats: ESPN.com; Baseball Reference

The 1974 Chicago Cubs season was the 103rd season of the Chicago Cubs franchise, the 99th in the National League and the 59th at Wrigley Field. The Cubs finished sixth and last in the National League East with a record of 66–96.

== Offseason ==
- October 25, 1973: Ferguson Jenkins was traded by the Cubs to the Texas Rangers for Bill Madlock and Vic Harris.
- November 3, 1973: Bob Locker was traded by the Cubs to the Oakland Athletics for Horacio Piña.
- November 7, 1973: Glenn Beckert and Bobby Fenwick were traded by the Cubs to the San Diego Padres for Jerry Morales.
- December 11, 1973: Ron Santo was traded by the Cubs to the Chicago White Sox for Steve Stone, Ken Frailing, and Steve Swisher and a player to be named later. The White Sox completed the deal by sending Jim Kremmel to the Cubs on December 18.
- March 19, 1974: Ken Rudolph was traded by the Cubs to the San Francisco Giants for Willie Prall.

== Regular season ==
- July 31, 1974: Bill Bonham had four strikeouts in one inning.

=== Season standings ===
NL East
Team	W	L	Pct.	GB	Home	Road
Pittsburgh Pirates	88	74	.543	—	52‍–‍29	36‍–‍45
St. Louis Cardinals	86	75	.534	1½	44‍–‍37	42‍–‍38
Philadelphia Phillies	80	82	.494	8	46‍–‍35	34‍–‍47
Montreal Expos	79	82	.491	8½	42‍–‍38	37‍–‍44
New York Mets	71	91	.438	17	36‍–‍45	35‍–‍46
Chicago Cubs	66	96	.407	22	32‍–‍49	34‍–‍47

=== Record vs. opponents ===
1974 National League record Sources:
Team	ATL	CHC	CIN	HOU	LAD	MON	NYM	PHI	PIT	SD	SF	STL
Atlanta	—	4–8	7–11–1	6–12	8–10	9–3	8–4	8–4	4–8	17–1	8–10	9–3
Chicago	8–4	—	5–7	4–8	2–10	5–13	8–10	8–10	9–9	6–6	6–6	5–13
Cincinnati	11–7–1	7–5	—	14–4	6–12	6–6	9–3	8–4	8–4	12–6	11–7	6–6
Houston	12–6	8–4	4–14	—	5–13	6–6	6–6	6–6	5–7	7–11	10–8	8–4
Los Angeles	10–8	10–2	12–6	13–5	—	8–4	5–7	6–6	4–8	16–2	12–6	6–6
Montreal	3–9	13–5	6–6	6–6	4–8	—	9–9	11–7	9–9	6–6	4–8	8–9
New York	4–8	10–8	3–9	6–6	7–5	9–9	—	7–11	7–11	6–6	6–6	6–12
Philadelphia	4-8	10–8	4–8	6–6	6–6	7–11	11–7	—	10–8	5–7	8–4	9–9
Pittsburgh	8–4	9–9	4–8	7–5	8–4	9–9	11–7	8–10	—	9–3	8–4	7–11
San Diego	1–17	6–6	6–12	7–11	2–16	6–6	6–6	7–5	3–9	—	11–7	5–7
San Francisco	10–8	6–6	7–11	8–10	6–12	8–4	6–6	4–8	4–8	7–11	—	6–6
St. Louis	3–9	13–5	6–6	4–8	6–6	9–8	12–6	9–9	11–7	7–5	6–6	—

=== Notable transactions ===
- April 1, 1974: Paul Popovich was traded by the Cubs to the Pittsburgh Pirates for Tom Dettore and cash.
- June 5, 1974: George Riley was drafted by the Cubs in the 4th round of the 1974 Major League Baseball draft.
- June 17, 1974: Oscar Zamora was purchased by the Cubs from the Houston Astros.
- July 28, 1974: Horacio Piña was traded by the Cubs to the California Angels for Rick Stelmaszek.

=== Roster ===
1974 Chicago Cubs
Roster
Pitchers: 33 Bill Bonham; 34 Ray Burris; 32 Tom Dettore; 47 Ken Frailing; 44 Burt Hooton; 40 Herb Hutson; 49 Jim Kremmel; 17 Dave LaRoche; 35 Mike Paul; 36 Horacio Piña; 48 Rick Reuschel; 30 Steve Stone; 39 Jim Todd; 45 Oscar Zamora	Catchers: 5 Adrian Garrett; 8 Tom Lundstedt; 15 George Mitterwald; 8 Rick Stelmaszek; 9 Steve Swisher; Infielders: 42 Matt Alexander; 28 Ron Dunn; 23 Carmen Fanzone; 10 Billy Grabarkewitz; 4 Vic Harris; 11 Don Kessinger; 18 Bill Madlock; 19 Gonzalo Márquez; 29 Dave Rosello; 16 Rob Sperring; 12 Andre Thornton; 26 Billy Williams	Outfielders: 1 José Cardenal; 21 Gene Hiser; 22 Pete LaCock; 7 Rick Monday; 24 Jerry Morales; 27 Jim Tyrone; 20 Chris Ward	Manager: 16 Whitey Lockman; 25 Jim Marshall; Coaches: 37 Hank Aguirre; 2 Jim Marshall; 6 J. C. Martin; 46 Pete Reiser; 3 Al Spangler

== Player stats ==
= Indicates team leader

= Indicates league leader

=== Batting ===
==== Starters by position ====
Note: Pos = Position; G = Games played; AB = At bats; H = Hits; Avg. = Batting average; HR = Home runs; RBI = Runs batted in

Pos	Player	G	AB	H	Avg.	HR	RBI
C	Steve Swisher	90	280	60	.214	5	27
1B	Andre Thornton	107	303	79	.261	10	46
2B	Vic Harris	62	200	39	.195	0	11
3B	Bill Madlock	128	453	142	.313	9	54
SS	Don Kessinger	153	599	155	.259	1	42
LF	Jerry Morales	151	534	146	.273	15	82
CF	Rick Monday	142	538	158	.294	20	58
RF	José Cardenal	143	542	159	.293	13	72

==== Other batters ====
Note: G = Games played; AB = At bats; H = Hits; Avg. = Batting average; HR = Home runs; RBI = Runs batted in

Player	G	AB	H	Avg.	HR	RBI
Billy Williams	117	404	113	.280	16	68
George Mitterwald	78	215	54	.251	7	28
Carmen Fanzone	65	158	30	.190	4	22
Dave Rosello	62	148	30	.203	0	10
Chris Ward	92	137	28	.204	1	15
Billy Grabarkewitz	53	125	31	.248	1	12
Pete LaCock	35	110	20	.182	1	8
Rob Sperring	42	107	22	.206	1	5
Jim Tyrone	57	81	15	.185	3	3
Ron Dunn	23	68	20	.294	2	15
Matt Alexander	45	54	11	.204	0	0
Rick Stelmaszek	25	44	10	.227	1	7
Tom Lundstedt	22	32	3	.094	0	0
Gene Hiser	12	17	4	.235	0	1
Gonzalo Márquez	11	11	0	.000	0	0
Adrian Garrett	10	8	0	.000	0	0

=== Pitching ===
==== Starting pitchers ====
Note: G = Games pitched; IP = Innings pitched; W = Wins; L = Losses; ERA = Earned run average; SO = Strikeouts

Player	G	IP	W	L	ERA	SO
Bill Bonham	44	242.2	11	22	3.86	191
Rick Reuschel	41	240.2	13	12	4.30	160

==== Other pitchers ====
Note: G = Games pitched; IP = Innings pitched; W = Wins; L = Losses; ERA = Earned run average; SO = Strikeouts

Player	G	IP	W	L	ERA	SO
Burt Hooton	48	176.1	7	11	4.80	94
Steve Stone	38	169.2	8	6	4.14	90
Ken Frailing	55	125.1	6	9	3.88	71
Jim Todd	43	88.0	4	2	3.89	42
Ray Burris	40	75.0	3	5	6.60	40
Tom Dettore	16	64.2	3	5	4.18	43

==== Relief pitchers ====
Note: G = Games pitched; W = Wins; L = Losses; SV = Saves; ERA = Earned run average; SO = Strikeouts

Player	G	W	L	SV	ERA	SO
Oscar Zamora	56	3	9	10	3.12	38
Dave LaRoche	49	5	6	5	4.79	49
Horacio Piña	34	3	4	4	3.99	32
Jim Kremmel	23	0	2	0	5.23	22
Herb Hutson	20	0	2	0	3.45	22
Mike Paul	2	0	1	0	27.00	1

== Farm system ==
Level	Team	League	Manager
AAA	Wichita Aeros	American Association	Mike Roarke
AA	Midland Cubs	Texas League	Walt Dixon
A	Key West Conchs	Florida State League	Jack Mull and Q. V. Lowe
Rookie	GCL Cubs	Gulf Coast League	Jack Mull

LEAGUE CHAMPIONS: GCL Cubs
