= List of Chicago Cubs Opening Day starting pitchers =

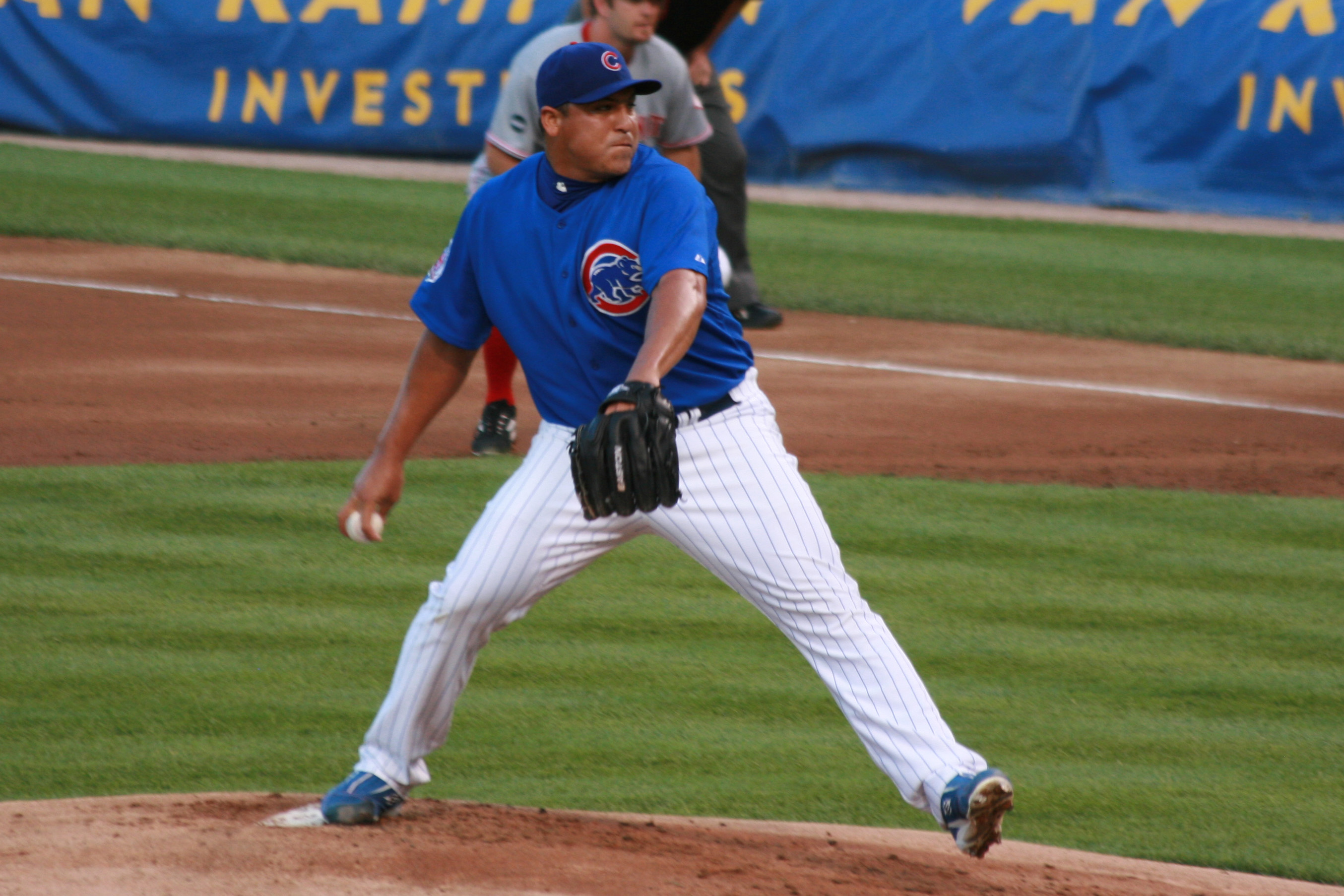
Carlos Zambrano was the Cubs' Opening Day starting pitcher from 2005 to 2010.

The Chicago Cubs are a Major League Baseball franchise based in Chicago that plays in the National League Central division. In the history of the franchise, it has also played under the names Chicago White Stockings, Chicago Colts and Chicago Orphans. The first game of the new baseball season for a team is played on Opening Day, and being named the Opening Day starter is an honor, which is often given to the player who is expected to lead the pitching staff that season, though there are various strategic reasons why a team's best pitcher might not start on Opening Day. The Cubs have used 68 different starting pitchers on Opening Day since they first became a Major League team in 1876. The Cubs have a record of 74 wins, 60 losses and 2 ties in their Opening Day games.

The Cubs have played in seven different home ball parks. They have played at their current home, Wrigley Field, since 1916. They have a record of 22 wins, 21 losses and 1 tie in Opening Day games at Wrigley Field. They had an Opening Day record of six wins, one loss and one tie at their other home ball parks, for a total home record in Opening Day games of 28 wins, 22 losses and 2 ties. Their record in Opening Day away games is 46 wins and 38 losses.

Ferguson Jenkins holds the Cubs record for most Opening Day starts with seven, in which his record was two wins, two losses and three no decisions. Carlos Zambrano has made six Opening Day starts. Larry Corcoran, Clark Griffith, Grover Cleveland Alexander, Charlie Root and Rick Sutcliffe have each made five Opening Day starts for the Cubs. Orval Overall, Lon Warneke, Bob Rush, Larry Jackson and Rick Reuschel each made four Opening Day starts for the Cubs, and Bill Hutchison, Jon Lieber, Ray Burris, Claude Passeau, Jack Taylor and Hippo Vaughn each made three such starts.

Five Cubs' Opening Day starting pitchers have been inducted into the Baseball Hall of Fame: Griffith, Alexander, Jenkins, Al Spalding and John Clarkson. In addition, 300–game winner Greg Maddux was the Cubs' Opening Day starting pitcher in 1992. The Cubs have won the modern World Series championship three times, in 1907, 1908 and 2016. Overall was the Cubs' Opening Day starting pitcher both seasons of 1907 and 1908 and the Cubs won both of those Opening Day games. Don Cardwell was the Cubs' Opening Day starting pitcher against the Houston Colt .45s on April 10, 1962, the first game in Houston's history. The Cubs lost the game by a score of 11–2.

== Key ==
Season	Each year is linked to an article about that particular Cubs season.
W	Win
L	Loss
T	Tie game
ND (W)	No decision by starting pitcher; Cubs won game
ND (L)	No decision by starting pitcher; Cubs lost game
(W)	Cubs won game; no information on starting pitcher's decision
(L)	Cubs lost game; no information on starting pitcher's decision
Final score	Game score with Cubs runs listed first
Location	Stadium in italics for home game
(#)	Number of appearances as Opening Day starter with the Cubs
*	Advanced to the post-season
**	National League Champions
†	World Series Champions

== Pitchers ==
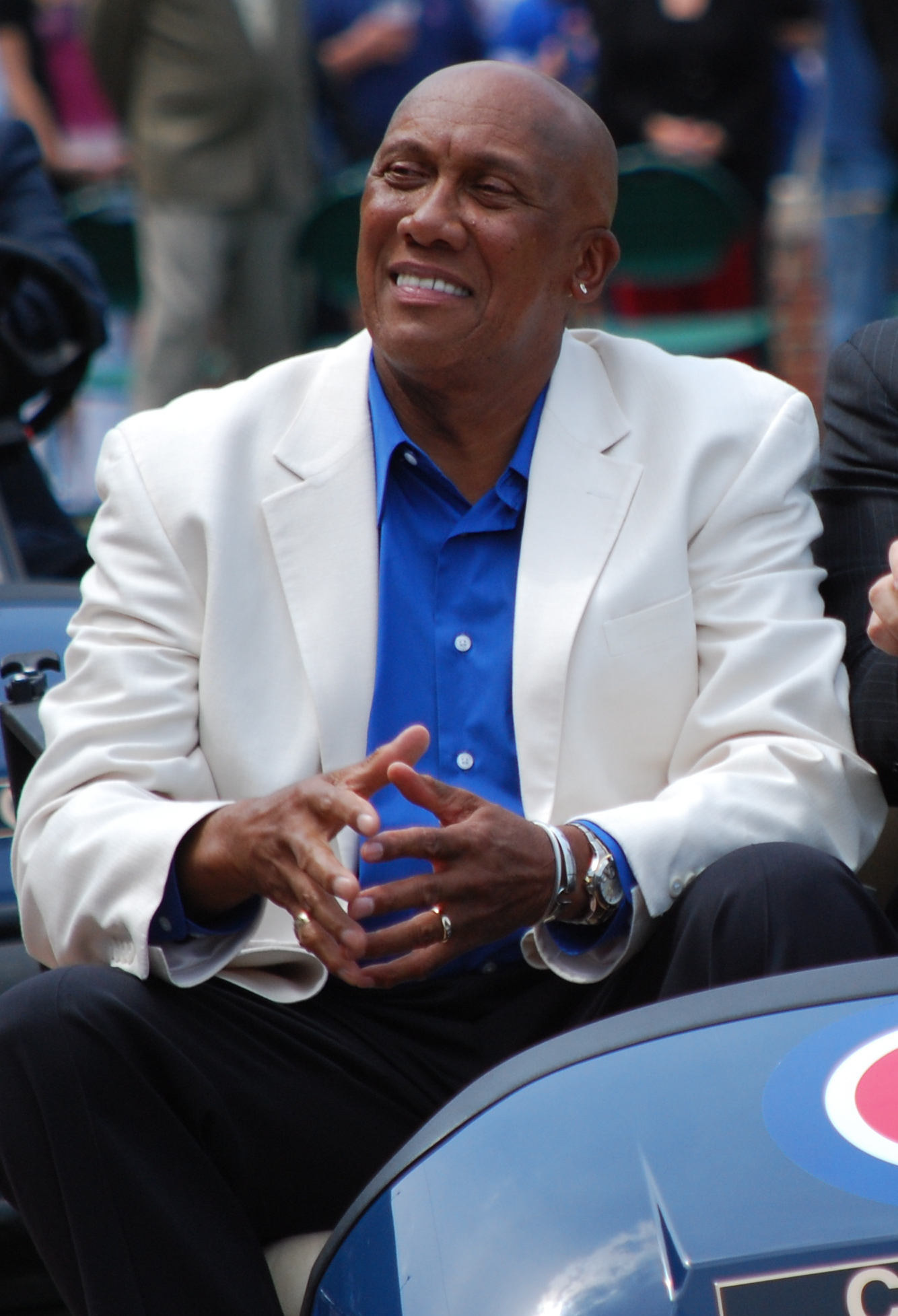
Ferguson Jenkins made seven Opening Day starts for the Cubs.

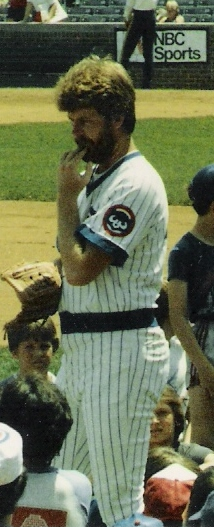
Rick Sutcliffe made five Opening Day starts for the Cubs.

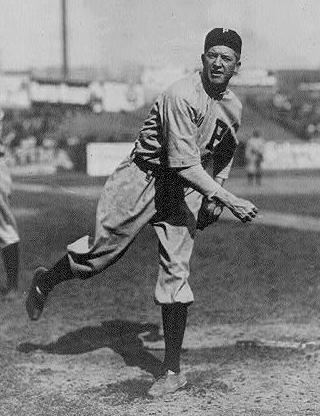
Grover Cleveland Alexander made five Opening Day starts for the Cubs.

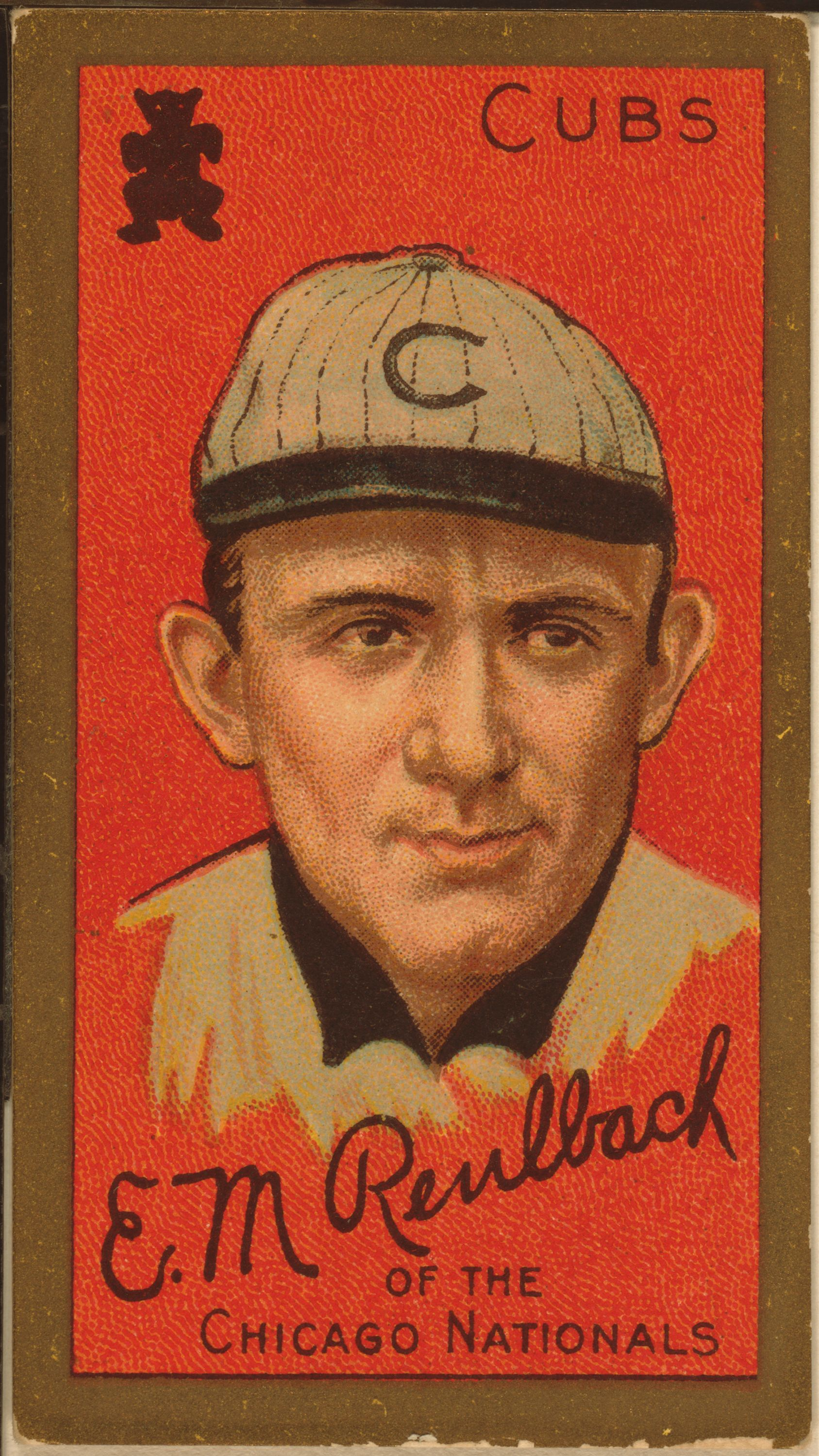
Ed Reulbach was the Cubs' Opening Day starting pitcher in 1911.

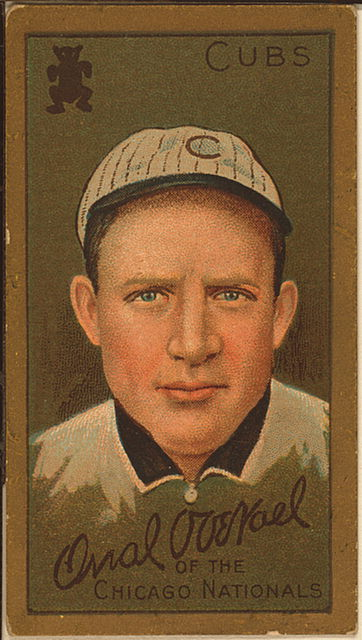
Orval Overall made four Opening Day starts for the Cubs.

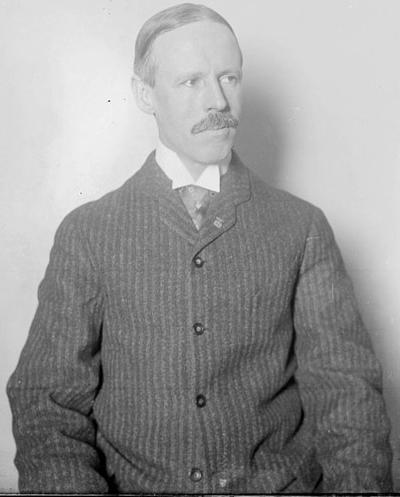
John Clarkson made two Opening Day starts for the Cubs.

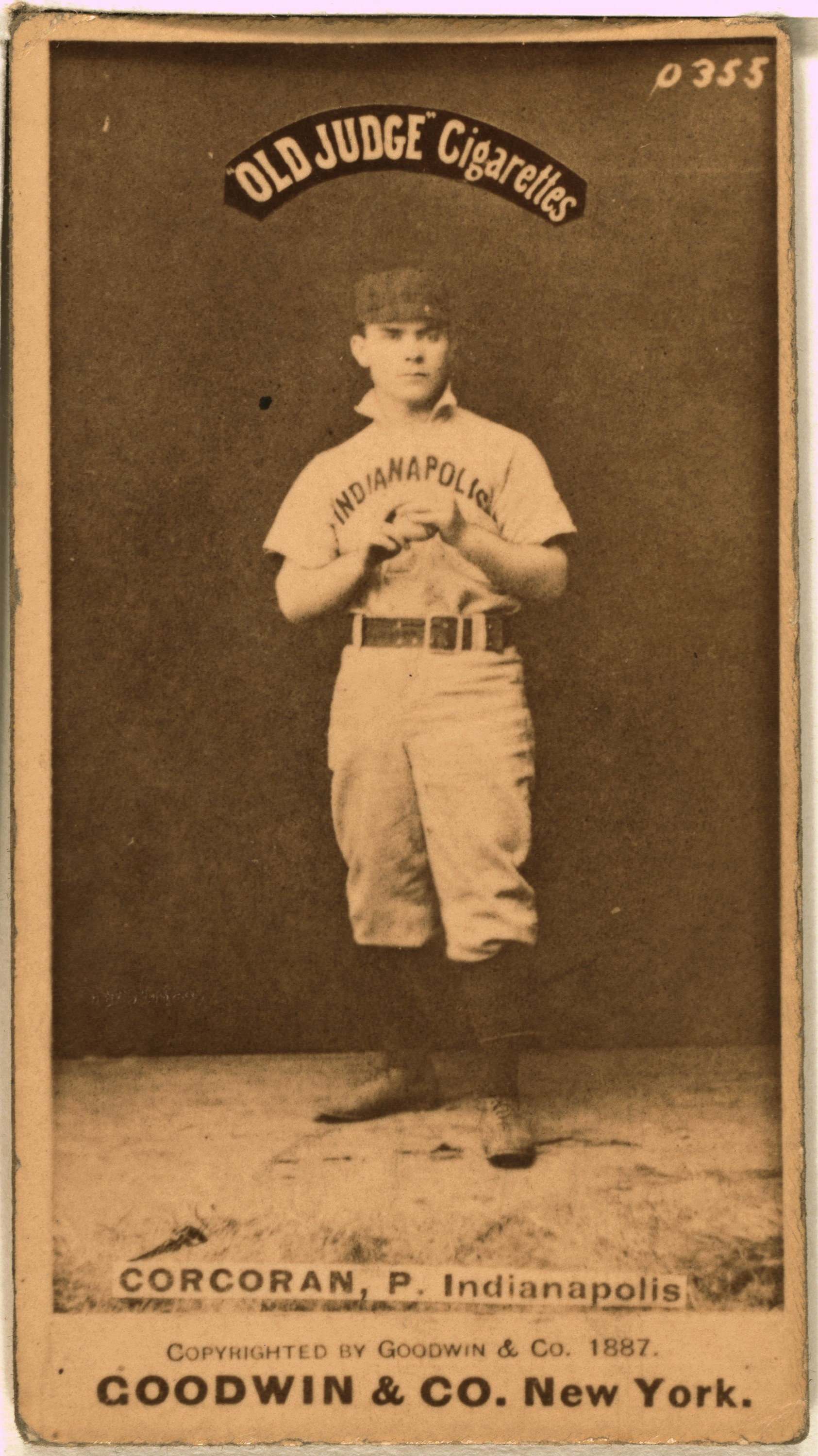
Larry Corcoran made five Opening Day starts for the Cubs.

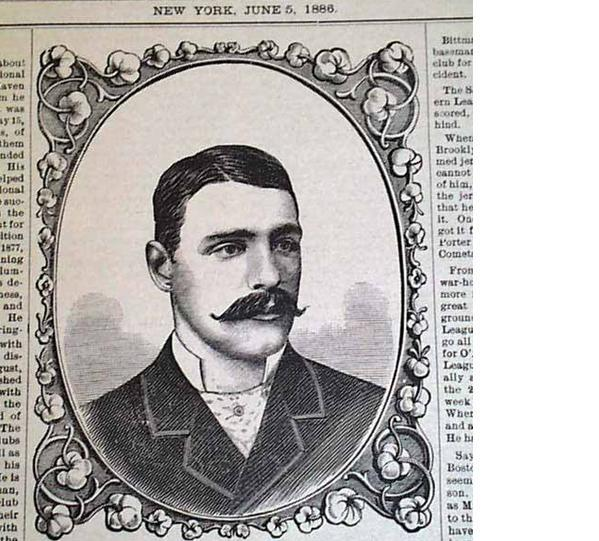
Fred Goldsmith was the Cubs' Opening Day starting pitcher in 1883.

Season	Pitcher	Decision	Final score	Opponent	Location	Ref(s)
1876**	Al Spalding	(W)	4–0	Louisville Grays	Louisville Baseball Park	
1877	George Bradley	(W)	6–5	Hartford Dark Blues	23rd Street Grounds	
1878	Terry Larkin	(W)	5–4	Indianapolis Blues	South Street Park	
1879	Terry Larkin (2)	(W)	4–3	Syracuse Stars	Lake Front Park	
1880**	Larry Corcoran	(W)	4–3	Cincinnati Reds	Bank Street Grounds	
1881**	Larry Corcoran (2)	(W)	8–5	Cleveland Spiders	Lake Front Park	
1882**	Larry Corcoran (3)	L	5–7	Buffalo Bisons	Riverside Grounds	
1883	Fred Goldsmith	(W)	7–4	Detroit Wolverines	Recreation Park	
1884	Larry Corcoran (4)	(L)	3–15	New York Gothams	Polo Grounds	
1885**	Larry Corcoran (5)	L	2–3	St. Louis Maroons	Union Grounds	
1886**	John Clarkson	(W)	6–5	Kansas City Cowboys	Association Park	
1887	John Clarkson (2)	(L)	2–6	Pittsburgh Pirates	Recreation Park	
1888	George Van Haltren	W	5–4	Indianapolis Hoosiers	Seventh Street Park	
1889	Bill Hutchison	(L)	5–8	Pittsburgh Pirates	Recreation Park	
1890	Bill Hutchison (2)	(W)	5–4	Cincinnati Reds	League Park	
1891	Pat Luby	(W)	7–6	Pittsburgh Pirates	Exposition Park	
1892	Ad Gumbert	(W)	14–10	St. Louis Browns	Sportsman's Park	
1893	Willie McGill	(L)	1–10	Cincinnati Reds	League Park	
1894	Bill Hutchison (3)	(L)	6–10	Cincinnati Reds	League Park	
1895	Clark Griffith	(W)	10–7	St. Louis Browns	Robison Field	
1896	Danny Friend	(W)	4–2	Louisville Colonels	Eclipse Park	
1897	Clark Griffith (2)	L	7–8	Cincinnati Reds	League Park	
1898	Clark Griffith (3)	(W)	2–1	St. Louis Browns	Robison Field	
1899	Clark Griffith (4)	(W)	15–1	Louisville Colonels	Eclipse Park	
1900	Clark Griffith (5)	(W)	13–10	Cincinnati Reds	League Park	
1901	Jack Taylor	(W)	8–7	St. Louis Cardinals	Robison Field	
1902	Jack Taylor (2)	W	6–1	Cincinnati Reds	Palace of the Fans	
1903	Jack Taylor (3)	L	1–2	St. Louis Cardinals	Robison Field	
1904	Jake Weimer	(L)	2–3	Cincinnati Reds	Palace of the Fans	
1905	Carl Lundgren	(W)	6–1	St. Louis Cardinals	Robison Field	
1906**	Carl Lundgren (2)	(W)	7–2	Cincinnati Reds	Palace of the Fans	
1907^{†}	Orval Overall	(W)	6–1	St. Louis Cardinals	West Side Park II	
1908^{†}	Orval Overall (2)	(W)	6–5	Cincinnati Reds	Palace of the Fans	
1909	Orval Overall (3)	(W)	3–1	St. Louis Cardinals	West Side Park II	
1910**	Orval Overall (4)	(L)	0–1	Cincinnati Reds	Palace of the Fans	
1911	Ed Reulbach	T	3–3	St. Louis Cardinals	West Side Park II	
1912	King Cole	(L)	6–10	Cincinnati Reds	Crosley Field	
1913	Jimmy Lavender	(L)	3–5	St. Louis Cardinals	West Side Park II	
1914	Larry Cheney	(L)	1–10	Cincinnati Reds	Crosley Field	
1915	Hippo Vaughn	(W)	7–2	St. Louis Cardinals	West Side Park II	
1916	George McConnell	(W)	7–1	Cincinnati Reds	Crosley Field	
1917	Hippo Vaughn (2)	(W)	5–3	Pittsburgh Pirates	Wrigley Field	
1918**	Grover Cleveland Alexander	(L)	2–4	St. Louis Cardinals	Robison Field	
1919	Hippo Vaughn (3)	(W)	5–1	Pittsburgh Pirates	Wrigley Field	
1920	Grover Cleveland Alexander (2)	(L)	3–7	Cincinnati Reds	Crosley Field	
1921	Grover Cleveland Alexander (3)	W	5–2	St. Louis Cardinals	Wrigley Field	
1922	Grover Cleveland Alexander (4)	W	7–3	Cincinnati Reds	Crosley Field	
1923	Tiny Osborne	L	2–3	Pittsburgh Pirates	Wrigley Field	
1924	Vic Aldridge	L	5–6	St. Louis Cardinals	Sportsman's Park	
1925	Grover Cleveland Alexander (5)	W	8–2	Pittsburgh Pirates	Wrigley Field	
1926	Wilbur Cooper	ND (L)	6–7	Cincinnati Reds	Crosley Field	
1927	Charley Root	W	10–1	St. Louis Cardinals	Wrigley Field	
1928	Charley Root (2)	L	1–5	Cincinnati Reds	Crosley Field	
1929**	Charley Root (3)	L	3–4	Pittsburgh Pirates	Wrigley Field	
1930	Sheriff Blake	W	9–8	St. Louis Cardinals	Sportsman's Park	
1931	Charley Root (4)	W	6–2	Pittsburgh Pirates	Wrigley Field	
1932**	Charley Root (5)	(L)	4–5	Cincinnati Reds	Crosley Field	
1933	Lon Warneke	W	3–0	St. Louis Cardinals	Wrigley Field	
1934	Lon Warneke (2)	W	6–0	Cincinnati Reds	Crosley Field	
1935**	Lon Warneke (3)	W	4–3	St. Louis Cardinals	Wrigley Field	
1936	Lon Warneke (4)	W	12–7	St. Louis Cardinals	Sportsman's Park	
1937	Larry French	(L)	0–5	Pittsburgh Pirates	Wrigley Field	
1938**	Clay Bryant	ND (W)	3–2	Cincinnati Reds	Crosley Field	
1939	Bill Lee	W	4–2	St. Louis Cardinals	Sportsman's Park	
1940	Bill Lee (2)	(L)	1–2	Cincinnati Reds	Crosley Field	
1941	Claude Passeau	W	7–4	Pittsburgh Pirates	Wrigley Field	
1942	Claude Passeau (2)	W	5–4	St. Louis Cardinals	Sportsman's Park	
1943	Paul Derringer	(L)	0–6	Pittsburgh Pirates	Wrigley Field	
1944	Hank Wyse	W	3–0	Cincinnati Reds	Crosley Field	
1945**	Paul Derringer (2)	W	3–2	St. Louis Cardinals	Wrigley Field	
1946	Claude Passeau (3)	ND (W)	4–3	Cincinnati Reds	Crosley Field	
1947	Hank Borowy	(L)	0–1	Pittsburgh Pirates	Wrigley Field	
1948	Russ Meyer	(L)	2–3	Pittsburgh Pirates	Forbes Field	
1949	Dutch Leonard	(L)	9–6	Pittsburgh Pirates	Wrigley Field	
1950	Johnny Schmitz	ND (W)	9–6	Cincinnati Reds	Crosley Field	
1951	Frank Hiller	ND (W)	8–3	Cincinnati Reds	Wrigley Field	
1952	Paul Minner	ND (W)	6–5	Cincinnati Reds	Crosley Field	
1953	Bob Rush	W	3–2	Cincinnati Reds	Wrigley Field	
1954	Paul Minner (2)	W	13–4	St. Louis Cardinals	Sportsman's Park	
1955	Bob Rush (2)	ND (W)	7–5	Cincinnati Reds	Crosley Field	
1956	Bob Rush (3)	L	0–6	Milwaukee Braves	County Stadium	
1957	Bob Rush (4)	L	1–4	Milwaukee Braves	Wrigley Field	
1958	Jim Brosnan	W	4–0	St. Louis Cardinals	Sportsman's Park	
1959	Bob Anderson	W	6–2	Los Angeles Dodgers	Wrigley Field	
1960	Bob Anderson (2)	ND (L)	2–3	Los Angeles Dodgers	Los Angeles Memorial Coliseum	
1961	Glen Hobbie	L	1–7	Cincinnati Reds	Crosley Field	
1962	Don Cardwell	L	2–11	Houston Colt .45s	Colt Stadium	
1963	Larry Jackson	L	1–5	Los Angeles Dodgers	Wrigley Field	
1964	Larry Jackson (2)	W	8–4	Pittsburgh Pirates	Forbes Field	
1965	Larry Jackson (3)	T	10–10	St. Louis Cardinals	Wrigley Field	
1966	Larry Jackson (4)	L	1–9	San Francisco Giants	Candlestick Park	
1967	Ferguson Jenkins	W	4–2	Philadelphia Phillies	Wrigley Field	
1968	Joe Niekro	L	4–9	Cincinnati Reds	Crosley Field	
1969	Ferguson Jenkins (2)	ND (W)	7–6	Philadelphia Phillies	Wrigley Field	
1970	Ferguson Jenkins (3)	L	0–2	Philadelphia Phillies	Connie Mack Stadium	
1971	Ferguson Jenkins (4)	W	2–1	St. Louis Cardinals	Wrigley Field	
1972	Ferguson Jenkins (5)	ND (L)	2–4	Philadelphia Phillies	Wrigley Field	
1973	Ferguson Jenkins (6)	ND (W)	3–2	Montreal Expos	Wrigley Field	
1974	Bill Bonham	W	2–0	Philadelphia Phillies	Wrigley Field	
1975	Bill Bonham (2)	ND (L)	4–8	Pittsburgh Pirates	Wrigley Field	
1976	Ray Burris	L	0–5	St. Louis Cardinals	Busch Stadium	
1977	Ray Burris (2)	L	3–5	New York Mets	Wrigley Field	
1978	Rick Reuschel	L	0–1	Pittsburgh Pirates	Three Rivers Stadium	
1979	Rick Reuschel (2)	L	6–10	New York Mets	Wrigley Field	
1980	Rick Reuschel (3)	L	2–5	New York Mets	Shea Stadium	
1981	Rick Reuschel (4)	L	0–2	New York Mets	Wrigley Field	
1982	Doug Bird	W	3–2	Cincinnati Reds	Riverfront Stadium	
1983	Ferguson Jenkins (7)	L	0–3	Montreal Expos	Wrigley Field	
1984*	Dick Ruthven	W	5–3	San Francisco Giants	Candlestick Park	
1985	Rick Sutcliffe	W	2–1	Pittsburgh Pirates	Wrigley Field	
1986	Rick Sutcliffe (2)	L	1–2	St. Louis Cardinals	Busch Stadium	
1987	Rick Sutcliffe (3)	L	3–9	St. Louis Cardinals	Wrigley Field	
1988	Rick Sutcliffe (4)	ND (W)	10–9	Atlanta Braves	Atlanta–Fulton County Stadium	
1989*	Rick Sutcliffe (5)	W	5–4	Philadelphia Phillies	Wrigley Field	
1990	Mike Bielecki	ND (W)	2–1	Philadelphia Phillies	Wrigley Field	
1991	Danny Jackson	L	1–4	St. Louis Cardinals	Wrigley Field	
1992	Greg Maddux	W	4–3	Philadelphia Phillies	Veterans Stadium	
1993	Mike Morgan	L	0–1	Atlanta Braves	Wrigley Field	
1994	Mike Morgan (2)	L	8–12	New York Mets	Wrigley Field	
1995	Jim Bullinger	W	7–1	Cincinnati Reds	Riverfront Stadium	
1996	Jaime Navarro	W	5–4	San Diego Padres	Wrigley Field	
1997	Terry Mulholland	L	2–4	Florida Marlins	Pro Player Stadium	
1998*	Kevin Tapani	L	6–11	Florida Marlins	Pro Player Stadium	
1999	Steve Trachsel	L	2–4	Houston Astros	Astrodome	
2000	Jon Lieber	W	5–3	New York Mets	Tokyo Dome	
2001	Jon Lieber (2)	ND (L)	4–5	Montreal Expos	Wrigley Field	
2002	Jon Lieber (3)	ND (L)	4–5	Cincinnati Reds	Cinergy Field	
2003*	Kerry Wood	W	15–2	New York Mets	Shea Stadium	
2004	Kerry Wood (2)	W	7–4	Cincinnati Reds	Great American Ball Park	
2005	Carlos Zambrano	ND (W)	16–6	Arizona Diamondbacks	Bank One Ballpark	
2006	Carlos Zambrano (2)	ND (W)	16–7	Cincinnati Reds	Great American Ball Park	
2007*	Carlos Zambrano (3)	L	1–5	Cincinnati Reds	Great American Ball Park	
2008*	Carlos Zambrano (4)	ND (L)	3–4	Milwaukee Brewers	Wrigley Field	
2009	Carlos Zambrano (5)	W	4–2	Houston Astros	Minute Maid Park	
2010	Carlos Zambrano (6)	L	5–16	Atlanta Braves	Turner Field	
2011	Ryan Dempster	L	3–6	Pittsburgh Pirates	Wrigley Field	
2012	Ryan Dempster (2)	ND	1–2	Washington Nationals	Wrigley Field	
2013	Jeff Samardzija	W	3–1	Pittsburgh Pirates	PNC Park	
2014	Jeff Samardzija (2)	ND (L)	0–1	Pittsburgh Pirates	PNC Park	
2015*	Jon Lester	L	0–3	St. Louis Cardinals	Wrigley Field	
2016†	Jake Arrieta	W	9–0	Los Angeles Angels of Anaheim	Angel Stadium	
2017*	Jon Lester (2)	ND (L)	3–4	St. Louis Cardinals	Busch Stadium	
2018*	Jon Lester (3)	ND (W)	8–4	Miami Marlins	Marlins Park	
2019	Jon Lester (4)	W	12–4	Texas Rangers	Globe Life Park in Arlington	
2020*	Kyle Hendricks	W	3–0	Milwaukee Brewers	Wrigley Field	
2021	Kyle Hendricks (2)	L	3–5	Pittsburgh Pirates	Wrigley Field	
2022	Kyle Hendricks (3)	ND (W)	5–4	Milwaukee Brewers	Wrigley Field	
2023	Marcus Stroman	W	4–0	Milwaukee Brewers	Wrigley Field	
2024	Justin Steele	ND (L)	3–4	Texas Rangers	Globe Life Field	
2025*	Shota Imanaga	ND (L)	1–4	Los Angeles Dodgers	Tokyo Dome	
2026*	Matt Boyd	L	4–10	Washington Nationals	Wrigley Field	
