= Jim Kremmel =

American baseball player (1949–2012)

- Pitcher
- Born: February 28, 1949; Belleville, Illinois, U.S.
- Died: October 12, 2012 (aged 63); Spokane, Washington, U.S.
- Batted: Left Threw: Left

MLB debut
- July 4, 1973, for the Texas Rangers

Last MLB appearance
- September 25, 1974, for the Chicago Cubs

MLB statistics
- Win–loss record: 0–4
- Earned run average: 6.08
- Strikeouts: 28
- Stats at Baseball Reference

Teams
- Texas Rangers (1973); Chicago Cubs (1974)

James Louis Kremmel (February 28, 1949 – October 12, 2012) was an American left-handed pitcher who spent two seasons in Major League Baseball (MLB) with the Texas Rangers (1973) and Chicago Cubs (1974).

Born in Belleville, Illinois, on February 28, 1949, Kremmel was raised in nearby Columbia. He graduated from Columbia High School.

He attended the University of New Mexico, where he earned a Bachelor of Arts in Finance and Economics in 1971. A four-year letterman on the Lobos baseball team, he threw the only documented nine-inning no-hitter in school history in a 1–0 win over Arizona in Tucson on April 17, 1970. He had matched the school record for most strikeouts in a single game with 18 against Eastern New Mexico University less than three weeks earlier on March 30, 1970. His 356 career strikeouts are still a school record. Named the All-Western Athletic Conference pitcher in 1969 and 1970, he ended his college career with a 22–14 record.

He was originally picked by the Cleveland Indians in the seventh round (146th overall) of the 1970 MLB draft, but chose not to sign. Selected ninth overall by the Washington Senators in the secondary phase of the January Free Agent Amateur Draft in 1971, he signed with the ballclub four months later on May 24. He is tied with Duane Ward (1982) for the third-highest draft pick of players hailing from New Mexico, behind shortstop Alex Bregman, who was selected with the second pick in the first round of the 2015 MLB draft, and third baseman D. J. Peterson was selected in the first round of the 2013 Major League Baseball draft.

He was traded by the Rangers to the St. Louis Cardinals for Don Durham on July 16, 1973. Kremmel was dealt twice after the conclusion of the 1973 season. He first went to the Chicago White Sox for Dennis O'Toole on October 26. He was then sent to the crosstown Cubs on December 18 to complete a transaction from a week earlier on December 11 in which Ron Santo was dealt to the White Sox for Steve Swisher, Steve Stone and Ken Frailing.

Kremmel died at age 63 in Spokane, Washington, on October 12, 2012.
