= George Mitterwald =

American baseball player, coach, and manager (born 1945)

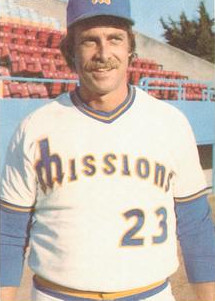
- Mitterwald in 1978
- Catcher
- Born: June 7, 1945 (age 81); Berkeley, California, U.S.
- Batted: Right Threw: Right

MLB debut
- September 16, 1966, for the Minnesota Twins

Last MLB appearance
- September 24, 1977, for the Chicago Cubs

MLB statistics
- Batting average: .236
- Home runs: 76
- Runs batted in: 301
- Stats at Baseball Reference

Teams
- As player: Minnesota Twins (1966, 1968–1973); Chicago Cubs (1974–1977); As coach: Oakland Athletics (1979–1982); New York Yankees (1988)

George Eugene Mitterwald (born June 7, 1945) is an American former professional baseball player, coach and manager. He played in 887 Major League Baseball games for the Minnesota Twins and Chicago Cubs, primarily as a catcher, over 11 seasons (1966; 1968–77). Mitterwald, nicknamed "the Baron", threw and batted right-handed. He stood 6 feet 2 inches (1.88 m) tall and weighed 195 pounds (88 kg).

Mitterwald played for skippers Billy Martin with the 1969 Twins and Jim Marshall with the Cubs from 1974 and 1976. He was traded from the Twins to the Cubs for Randy Hundley at the Winter Meetings on December 6, 1973.

After his active career ended in minor league baseball in 1978, Mitterwald became the bullpen coach of the Oakland Athletics in 1979 under Marshall, then was retained when Martin replaced Marshall as Oakland's manager. He continued to serve in that post under Martin for the 1980–82 seasons, then was again hired by Martin to serve as the New York Yankees' bullpen coach in 1988, Martin's fifth and last term as the Yankees' manager.

Mitterwald also managed the Modesto A's in 1983–85 and the Orlando Twins in 1986–87. During the mid-1990s, he was the manager of the independent Duluth–Superior Dukes team. In 1997, he led the team to the Northern League Championship. He coached female pro pitcher Ila Borders while managing the Dukes.
