= Herb Hutson =

American baseball player (born 1949)

- Pitcher
- Born: July 17, 1949; Savannah, Georgia, U.S.
- Died: February 28, 2026 (aged 76); Savannah, Georgia, U.S.
- Batted: Right Threw: Right

MLB debut
- April 10, 1974, for the Chicago Cubs

Last MLB appearance
- September 29, 1974, for the Chicago Cubs

MLB statistics
- Win–loss record: 0–2
- ERA: 3.45
- Strikeouts: 22
- Stats at Baseball Reference

Teams
- Chicago Cubs (1974)

George Herbert Hutson, Jr. (July 17, 1949 – February 28, 2026) was a Major League Baseball (MLB) pitcher. Hutson played for the Chicago Cubs in 1974.

== Baseball career ==
Hutson pitched in college for the Georgia Southern Eagles. He was drafted in the 12th round (295th overall pick) of the 1970 MLB June Amateur Draft by the Baltimore Orioles. Hutson was selected as a Rule 5 pick by the Cubs in 1973 and made his big league debut on April 10, 1974, pitching in relief against the Philadelphia Phillies. In his only MLB season, he pitched in 20 games, starting two, with a 0–2 record and 3.45 ERA. He pitched in AA Wichita for the Cubs in 1975 and the Mexico City Reds in 1976 before arm injuries forced him to retire at the age of 26.

== Personal ==
Following his playing career, Hutson worked as a private pitching coach in his the Savannah, Georgia area and as operations director at a paper chemical supply company. Hutson and his wife, Janet, were married for 55 years. Hutson died on February 28, 2026.

Hutson was inducted into the Greater Savannah Athletic Hall of Fame in 1986.
