= Ed Putman =

American baseball player (born 1953)

- Catcher
- Born: September 25, 1953 (age 72); Los Angeles, California, U.S.
- Batted: Right Threw: Right

MLB debut
- September 7, 1976, for the Chicago Cubs

Last MLB appearance
- September 26, 1979, for the Detroit Tigers

MLB statistics
- Batting average: .239
- Home runs: 2
- Runs batted in: 7
- Stats at Baseball Reference

Teams
- Chicago Cubs (1976, 1978); Detroit Tigers (1979)

Eddy William Putman (born September 25, 1953) is an American former Major League Baseball catcher. He played parts of three seasons in the major leagues between 1976 and 1979. He played mostly behind the plate, but also played some first base and third base.

== Sources ==
- Career statistics from Baseball Reference · Baseball Reference (Minors) · Retrosheet · Baseball Almanac
