= Rob Sperring =

American baseball player (born 1949)

- Infielder
- Born: October 10, 1949 (age 76); San Francisco, California, U.S.
- Batted: Right Threw: Right

MLB debut
- August 11, 1974, for the Chicago Cubs

Last MLB appearance
- October 2, 1977, for the Houston Astros

MLB statistics
- Batting average: .211
- Home runs: 3
- Runs batted in: 30
- Stats at Baseball Reference

Teams
- Chicago Cubs (1974–1976); Houston Astros (1977)

Robert Walter Sperring (born October 10, 1949) is an American former professional baseball player who played for the Chicago Cubs from 1974 to 1976 and the Houston Astros in 1977. He was involved in a pair of transactions separated by 1 1/2 months of each other just before the start of the 1977 season. He was traded along with Bill Madlock from the Cubs to the San Francisco Giants for Bobby Murcer, Steve Ontiveros and minor-league right-handed pitcher Andy Muhlstock on February 11. He never appeared in a regular-season game with the Giants who dealt him along with Willie Crawford to the Astros for Rob Andrews and cash during spring training on March 26.
