= Ray Burris =

American baseball player (born 1950)

- Pitcher
- Born: August 22, 1950 (age 76); Idabel, Oklahoma, U.S.
- Batted: Right Threw: Right

MLB debut
- April 8, 1973, for the Chicago Cubs

Last MLB appearance
- September 27, 1987, for the Milwaukee Brewers

MLB statistics
- Win–loss record: 108–134
- Earned run average: 4.17
- Strikeouts: 1,065
- Stats at Baseball Reference

Teams
- Chicago Cubs (1973–1979); New York Yankees (1979); New York Mets (1979–1980); Montreal Expos (1981–1983); Oakland Athletics (1984); Milwaukee Brewers (1985); St. Louis Cardinals (1986); Milwaukee Brewers (1987)

Bertram Ray Burris (born August 22, 1950) is an American former pitcher in Major League Baseball (MLB), and the current rehabilitation pitching coordinator in the Philadelphia Phillies organization. He played in MLB from 1973 through 1987 for seven different teams. Listed at 6 feet 5 inches (1.96 m) and 200 pounds (91 kg), he threw and batted right-handed.

== Early years ==
Burris was born in Idabel, Oklahoma. The son of sharecroppers, Burris spent up to fifteen hours a day working the fields with his family through high school. He earned a Bachelor of Arts degree in Recreational Leadership at Southwestern Oklahoma State University, in addition to playing basketball and baseball. In 1972, he received All-America honors and set a National Association of Intercollegiate Athletics record with 150 strikeouts, and pitched the Bulldogs to a fifth-place finish at the NAIA National Tournament.

== Playing career ==
=== Chicago Cubs ===
Burris was drafted by the Chicago Cubs in the 17th round of the 1972 Major League Baseball draft. After just one season in the Cubs' farm system, in which he went 7–5 with a 3.51 earned run average for the AA Texas League's Midland Cubs, Burris jumped to the majors to start the 1973 season. He made his major league debut in the third game of the season against the Montreal Expos, and pitched 3.1 innings of scoreless ball. In his next appearance, he made his only start of the season. He pitched five innings of shutout ball to defeat Jon Matlack and the New York Mets. He did not allow an earned run until his sixth appearance of the season, against the San Francisco Giants. Overall, Burris went 1–1 with a 2.92 ERA.

He returned to the bullpen in 1974. His first major league save was an impressive six out save, in which he struck out four of the six Pittsburgh Pirates batters he faced to secure the 1–0 victory. Two days later, he entered a game against the Philadelphia Phillies in the 11th inning with runners on first and second and one out. He struck out Terry Harmon, and got Bob Boone to hit a weak pop up to first base to escape the inning, then pitched two more scoreless innings to earn his second win of the season, and lower his ERA to 0.93.

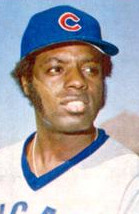
Burris with the Chicago Cubs

Things soon took a turn for the worse, however. He entered a 3–3 tie with the Atlanta Braves with Hank Aaron at bat and the bases loaded. The Hall of Famer hit a grand slam for career home run 721. Burris then allowed an additional two earned runs, while only retiring one batter, before being relieved. By the end of the season, Burris' ERA soared to 6.60.

As a starter, he was 0–4 with a 9.41 ERA in five starts, all in the second half of the season. Regardless, Cubs manager Jim Marshall moved Burris into the starting rotation for 1975. He pitched his first career complete game in his first start. His first career shutout on May 26 improved his record to 6–3 with a 3.57 ERA. For the season, Burris led his team both with his fifteen victories, including each of his final six decisions on the season, as well as with 238.1 innings pitched.

In 1976, Burris got off to a 1–7 start. He was given the opening day start, and while he made a quality start (six innings pitched, two earned runs), he took the loss as St. Louis Cardinals starter Lynn McGlothen held the Cubs scoreless. On July 18, he suffered a complete game loss to the San Diego Padres when Cubs shortstop Mick Kelleher's ninth inning error led to an unearned run.

His record stood at 4–11 at that point; however, Burris soon turned his season around. He pitched a three-hit shutout over the Expos on July 27. On September 11, he pitched into the tenth inning while allowing just one unearned run. He followed that up with back-to-back shutouts of the Expos and Phillies to give him a stretch of 28 innings pitched without an earned run. He went 11–2 with a 2.10 ERA over the remainder of the season to bring his record to 15–13. His fifteen wins, 3.11 ERA, four shutouts and ten complete games all led the Cubs staff. His 249 innings pitched was a career best.

Burris pitched the season opener again in 1977, and was again the victim of a hard luck loss. Facing Tom Seaver and the New York Mets, Burris had a 2–0 lead when he took the mound in the sixth inning. John Milner's RBI double brought the score to 2–1. Burris then intentional walked Dave Kingman to hand the ball to Bruce Sutter with one out and the bases loaded. Sutter allowed all three inherited base runners to score.

The long ball got the better of Burris in 1977. He was 14–16 with a 4.72 ERA, and led the National League with 29 home runs allowed. Coincidentally, he also hit his only career home run off Atlanta's Buzz Capra on May 20.

Burris cut down on the home runs in 1978, but his record fell to 7–13. He began the 1979 season in the bullpen, which displeased him. Though he was largely ineffective, his best relief performance of the season came in a 23–22 marathon against the Phillies, in which he pitched 1.2 innings of one-hit ball after pitching four innings the previous day. On May 23, the Cubs traded Burris to the New York Yankees for reliever Dick Tidrow.

=== New York Yankees and New York Mets ===
Burris' tenure with the Yankees did not go well. He made fifteen appearances in relief, and was 1–3 with a 6.18 ERA. On August 20, he was selected off waivers by the crosstown Mets. Going to the Mets was something of a mixed blessing for Burris, giving him the opportunity to start again, but on a last place team, twenty games back of the first place Pirates.

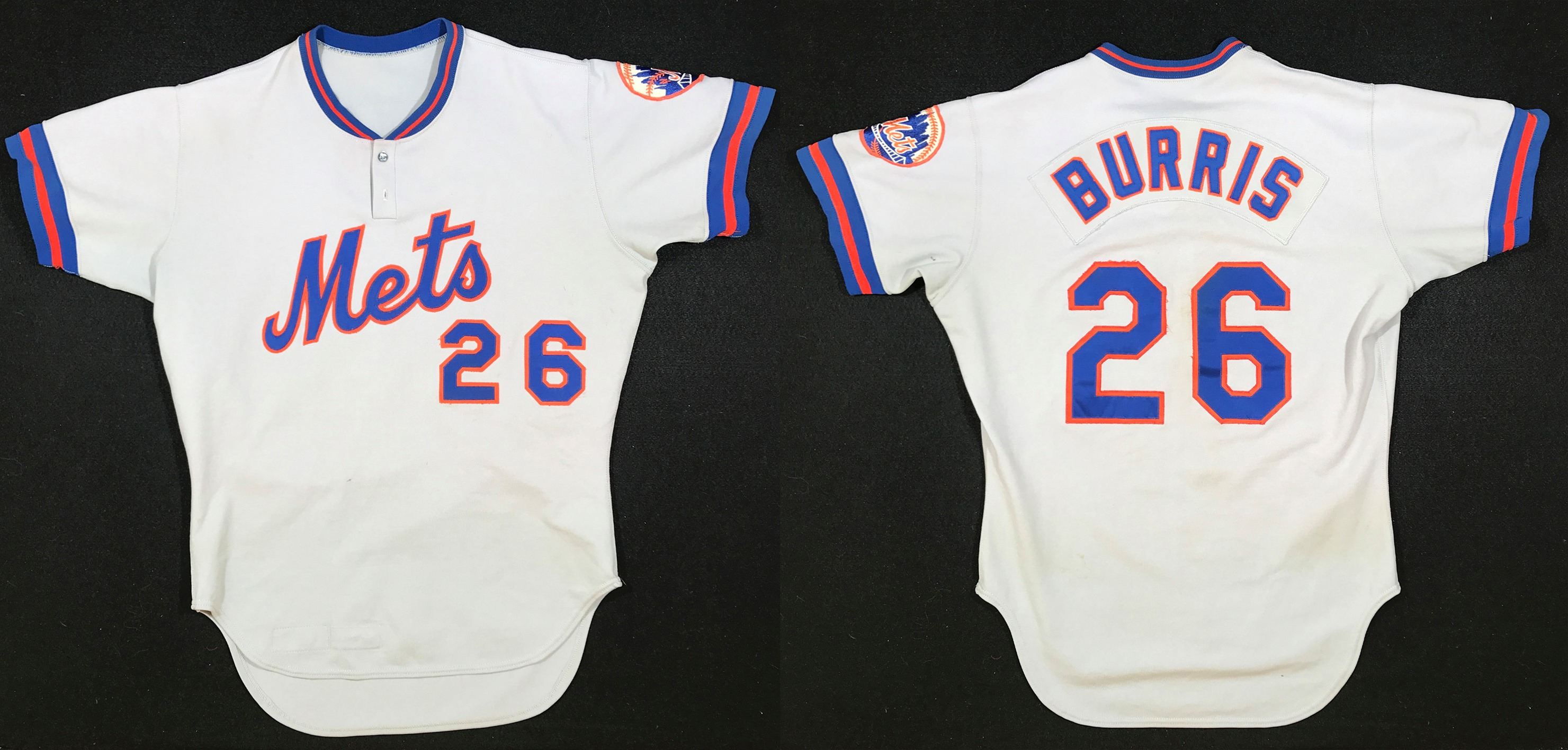
New York Mets 1980 #26 Ray Burris road jersey

In his Mets debut, Burris pitched seven innings of two-hit ball against the Cincinnati Reds, while Reds pitcher Bill Bonham also held the Mets scoreless. Reliever Neil Allen allowed a run in the eighth, and the Reds won, 1–0. In three more starts over the rest of the season, he went 0–2 with a 4.91 ERA.

Looking to solidify his role in the Mets' starting rotation, Burris showed up for Spring training early in 1980. The early work paid off; he had a 2.39 ERA through the end of May. Still, the Mets' anemic offense kept his record to 3–3. On May 2, a throwing error by Mets catcher John Stearns led to an unearned run for the San Diego Padres, who went on to win, 1–0. Burris had allowed just two hits over eight innings. He didn't allow an earned run in his next start, however more poor defense led to two unearned runs. Burris ended up with a no decision despite holding Cincinnati's "Big Red Machine" to just three hits over seven innings. His record stood at 4–6 with a 3.43 ERA when he missed all of July due to a broken thumb. When he returned in August, he pitched a complete game victory over the first-place Expos. The World Series-champion Pirates had moved into first place in the National League East by the time he faced them in his next start. He held them to one run over eight innings to improve his record to 6–6. His record stood at an even 7–7 when he defeated the Los Angeles Dodgers on August 22. He then lost his final six decisions as a Met.

=== Montreal Expos ===
During the off season, Burris signed as a free agent with the Expos, and the bad luck that had plagued him in New York continued in Montreal. In his final start of the first half of the strike-shortened season, he lost a complete game effort to the Reds, 2–0. His record stood at 3–5 despite a 3.09 ERA. He had far better luck in the second half of the season, as he went 6–2 despite a relatively similar ERA (3.01 in the second half). The Expos went 30–23 to win the second half by half a game over the Cardinals, and take Burris to his only career post season.

He made his lone start in game 3 of the 1981 National League Division Series against the Phillies, and was losing 2–1 when he exited in the fifth inning with one out, and runners on first and second. Bill Lee allowed both inherited runners to score, giving Burris four earned runs in 5.1 innings for the loss.

The Expos advanced to the 1981 National League Championship Series against the Dodgers. After Bill Gullickson lost game 1 to Burt Hooton, Burris took the mound for game 2 against rookie phenom Fernando Valenzuela. In the biggest game of his career, Burris scattered five hits in a complete game shutout of the Dodgers, evening the series at one game each. With the series tied at two games apiece, Burris and Valenzuela met again in the decisive fifth game. They dueled to a 1–1 tie through eight innings. Burris departed in the ninth in favor of Expos ace Steve Rogers. Rogers served up a home run to Rick Monday to allow the Dodgers to advance to the 1981 World Series.

1982 was a disaster for Burris. Despite pitching complete games in each of his first two starts of the season, he was 0–2 with a 1.13 ERA. By the end of May, his record was 0–7. The Expos scored one or fewer runs in four of those losses.

His ERA ballooned to 5.56 by the time manager Jim Fanning moved him into the bullpen. He earned his first win of the season in relief. On June 21, he pitched three innings of one hit ball against the Mets to earn his second career save. He still made the occasional spot start after his move to the bullpen, and ended the season at 0–11 as a starter. He was 4–3 in relief.

After beginning the 1983 season in the bullpen, Burris pitched well enough (2.45 ERA) through seventeen appearances to get a shot at starting again. He got a no decision in his first start against the Mets, pitching eight innings and allowing two runs (one earned). He three hit the Phillies on June 20. Overall, he was 3–5 with a 3.91 ERA as a starter, and 1–2 with a 3.19 ERA in relief.

=== Oakland A's ===
During the off season, he was traded to the Oakland Athletics for outfielder Rusty McNealy. Burris started the 1984 season in the bullpen. He was called upon for long relief in the second game of the season, and pitched six scoreless innings for the win. After 16.1 innings in relief, in which he had allowed just two earned runs, Burris was handed his first start on April 28. He pitched a four-hit shutout over the Minnesota Twins. A rejuvenated Burris emerged as the top arm in the A's rotation; he was 7–3 with a 2.13 ERA by the end of May. For the season, he led his team with thirteen wins and 211.2 innings pitched. His 3.32 ERA as a starter (3.15 overall) was also tops among A's starting pitchers.

Following the season, the A's sent Burris, along with a minor leaguer and a player to be named later, to the Milwaukee Brewers for Don Sutton.

=== Milwaukee Brewers ===
Burris won his first start as a Brewer, then lost his next four starts in a row. On May 14, he was 1–4 with a 2.23 ERA. He had evened his record to 9–9 before losing his last four decisions. Regardless, his nine wins were second-best on the team. On August 11, he struck out Ozzie Guillen for his 1,000th career strikeout.

The Brewers released Burris toward the end of spring training in 1986, after which he signed a minor league deal with the Cardinals.

=== St. Louis Cardinals ===
Burris went 1–1 with a 2.41 ERA in four starts for the Louisville Redbirds before he was called up to the majors. He pitched seven innings to win his first start as a Cardinal, 6–3, over the Giants. Additionally, in his first at bat in over two years, Burris connected for a bases loaded double to give the Cards a 3–0 lead. In his next start, Burris was 2-for-3 with four runs batted in. Burris became the first Cardinals pitcher with back-to-back three RBI games since Dizzy Dean in 1936. He went 4–5 with a 5.60 ERA as a Cardinal before he was released in August with 55 games remaining on the schedule.

=== Career stats ===
W	L	Pct	ERA	G	GS	GF	SHO	IP	H	ER	R	HR	BB	K	WP	HBP	BAA	Fld%	Avg.
108	134	.446	4.17	480	302	65	10	2188.2	2310	1015	1133	221	764	1065	69	54	.274	.952	.151

== Coaching career ==
For the 1987 season, Burris was hired as assistant to Brewers general manager Harry Dalton and as a minor-league instructor. While coaching the Stockton Ports in the California League, Burris took the mound for two games. His pitching was better than expected, and he soon found himself back in a Milwaukee Brewers uniform pitching in the major leagues again. He appeared in ten games, going 2–2 with a 5.87 ERA before retiring for the final time as a player.

For the 1990 and 1991 seasons, Burris served as Milwaukee's major league pitching coach. In 1992, he became the bullpen coach of the Texas Rangers, and also worked in their front office and minor league systems.

In 2001 and 2002, he served as a roving pitching instructor in the Cardinals' farm system. From there, he moved to the Detroit Tigers organization. In 2006, he was pitching coach for the Oneonta Tigers in the New York–Penn League. In 2007, he was pitching coach of the West Michigan Whitecaps in the Midwest League. In 2008, he became pitching coach of the Erie SeaWolves, the Tigers' Double-A affiliate. In 2013, he joined the Phillies organization as pitching coach for the Lehigh Valley IronPigs, the Phillies' Triple-A affiliate. In 2016, he became the Phillies' rehabilitation pitching coach.

Preceded by Bill Bonham	Chicago Cubs Opening Day; Starting pitcher 1976 & 1977	Succeeded by Rick Reuschel
Preceded by Chuck Hartenstein	Milwaukee Brewers Pitching Coach; 1990 & 1991	Succeeded by Don Rowe
