= Ken Frailing =

American baseball player (1948–2022)

- Pitcher
- Born: January 19, 1948; Madison, Wisconsin, U.S.
- Died: August 25, 2022 (aged 74); Sarasota, Florida, U.S.
- Batted: Left Threw: Left

MLB debut
- September 1, 1972, for the Chicago White Sox

Last MLB appearance
- June 6, 1976, for the Chicago Cubs

MLB statistics
- Win–loss record: 10–16
- Earned run average: 3.96
- Strikeouts: 136
- Stats at Baseball Reference

Teams
- Chicago White Sox (1972–1973); Chicago Cubs (1974–1976)

Kenneth Douglas Frailing (January 19, 1948 – August 25, 2022) was an American professional baseball player, a left-handed pitcher who appeared in 116 Major League games for the Chicago White Sox (1972–1973) and Chicago Cubs (1974–1976).

Drafted by the White Sox in the fifth round of the 1966 Major League Baseball draft after graduating from Marion High School, the 6 ft (1.8 m), 190 lb (86 kg) Frailing spent seven seasons in the ChiSox farm system before his recall in the closing weeks of the 1972 season. He appeared in four games as a relief pitcher that year, then ten more in 1973 during a year largely spent with the Triple-A Iowa Oaks. However, his success in the minor leagues that season — he won 11 of 14 decisions with a stellar 2.86 earned run average and was named to the official American Association All-Star Team — attracted the attention of the crosstown Cubs who acquired Frailing along with Steve Stone and Steve Swisher from the White Sox for Ron Santo on December 11, 1973. Jim Kremmel was also sent to the Cubs to complete the transaction one week later on December 18.

Frailing made the 1974 Cubs' Major League roster and appeared in 55 games as a "swing" man, making 16 starts and compiling a 6–9 record and a 3.88 earned run average in 125 1/3 innings pitched. On May 27, he registered his only MLB complete game, a 12–4 triumph over the San Francisco Giants at Wrigley Field, despite surrendering 15 hits. Notably, though, Frailing helped his own cause as a batter that day, with three hits in four at bats and three runs batted in. Frailing made 41 more appearances for the Cubs, all in relief, in 1975, but his ERA ballooned to 5.43. He began 1976 in promising fashion, with only one earned run allowed in his first 14 2/3 innings pitched, but a lingering shoulder injury shut him down and effectively ended his career. He pitched in only 16 games in 1976 and 15 in 1977, all but six of them in the minor leagues, and retired as an active player after the 1978 season.

During his MLB career, Frailing made 19 starts and 97 relief appearances. He allowed 252 hits and 82 bases on balls, with 136 strikeouts, in 218 1/3 innings pitched. He compiled a 10–16 (3.96) record with two saves.

Frailing died suddenly on August 26, 2022, at the age of 74.
