= Ron Dunn (baseball) =

American baseball player (born 1950)

- Second baseman / Third baseman
- Born: January 24, 1950 (age 76); Oklahoma City, Oklahoma, U.S.
- Batted: Right Threw: Right

MLB debut
- September 3, 1974, for the Chicago Cubs

Last MLB appearance
- September 21, 1975, for the Chicago Cubs

MLB statistics
- Batting average: .241
- Home runs: 3
- Runs batted in: 21
- Stats at Baseball Reference

Teams
- Chicago Cubs (1974–1975)

Ronald Ray Dunn (born January 24, 1950) is an American former Major League Baseball player. Dunn played for the Chicago Cubs in 1974 and 1975. He was primarily used as a pinch hitter, but was also used as a second baseman and third baseman.

Dunn currently resides in San Jose, CA.
