= Ken Crosby =

Canadian baseball player (born 1947)

- Pitcher
- Born: December 15, 1947 (age 77); New Denver, British Columbia, Canada
- Batted: Right Threw: Right

MLB debut
- August 5, 1975, for the Chicago Cubs

Last MLB appearance
- May 8, 1976, for the Chicago Cubs

MLB statistics
- Win–loss record: 1–0
- Earned run average: 8.41
- Strikeouts: 11
- Stats at Baseball Reference

Teams
- Chicago Cubs (1975–1976)

Kenneth Stewart Crosby (born December 15, 1947) is a Canadian former Major League Baseball pitcher for the Chicago Cubs.

He grew up in Provo, Utah and attended Brigham Young University, where he played on the baseball team from 1967 to 1969. He was a 10th round pick by the New York Yankees in 1969. He would go on to play in the majors in 1975 and 1976, both years with the Cubs. He played in 16 career games with a 1–0 record and an ERA of 8.41 in 20 1/3 innings.
