= Buddy Schultz =

American baseball player (born 1950)

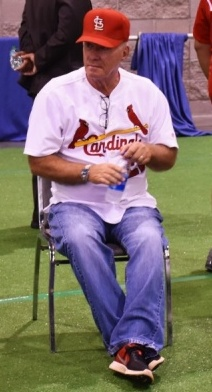
- Schultz at Phoenix Convention Center in 2018
- Pitcher
- Born: September 19, 1950 (age 75); Cleveland, Ohio, U.S.
- Batted: Right Threw: Left

MLB debut
- September 3, 1975, for the Chicago Cubs

Last MLB appearance
- September 28, 1979, for the St. Louis Cardinals

MLB statistics
- Win–loss record: 15–9
- Earned run average: 3.68
- Strikeouts: 193
- Stats at Baseball Reference

Teams
- Chicago Cubs (1975–1976); St. Louis Cardinals (1977–1979)

Charles Budd Schultz (born September 19, 1950), is a former Major League Baseball player who played pitcher from 1975 to 1979. He played for the Chicago Cubs and St. Louis Cardinals.

Schultz holds the NCAA record for most strikeouts in a game. On April 3, 1971, while playing for Miami University, he recorded 26 strikeouts against Wright State.
