= Willie Prall =

American baseball player (born 1950)

- Pitcher
- Born: April 20, 1950 (age 76); Hackensack, New Jersey, U.S.
- Batted: Left Threw: Left

MLB debut
- September 3, 1975, for the Chicago Cubs

Last MLB appearance
- September 15, 1975, for the Chicago Cubs

MLB statistics
- Win–loss record: 0–2
- Earned run average: 8.59
- Strikeouts: 7
- Stats at Baseball Reference

Teams
- Chicago Cubs (1975)

Wilfred Anthony Prall (born April 20, 1950) is an American former Major League Baseball pitcher. Prall was drafted by the San Francisco Giants in the third round of the 1971 Major League Baseball draft, then was traded to the Chicago Cubs in 1974 in exchange for catcher Ken Rudolph. Prall's major league career began and ended in 1975 with the Cubs, when he pitched in three games, winning one and losing two.

== Cultural references ==
In season 1, episode 15 of the TV show Prison Break, a Cubs pitcher named "William Prall" is shown in flashback, and referred to as the favorite player of the father of one of the characters, Lincoln Burrows.

== Sources ==
- Career statistics from Baseball Reference · Baseball Reference (Minors) · Retrosheet · Baseball Almanac
