= Jim West (sportscaster) =

American sports announcer (1929–2024)

James Griffith Wetzel (March 24, 1929 – July 31, 2024), known on-air as Jim West, was an American sportscaster who worked in Baltimore and Chicago. He was a play-by-play announcer for the Chicago Blackhawks, Chicago Cubs, and Washington Capitals.

== Biography ==
West was born in Pittsburgh on March 24, 1929. He grew up in Baltimore, and graduated from Towson State College. In 1962, he was hired to handle play-by-play for Baltimore Clippers games on WITH radio. The following season, both the Clippers and West moved to WBAL, where West also hosted the Baltimore Orioles pre- and post-game shows. In 1967, West received the James H. Ellery Memorial Award for outstanding media coverage of the American Hockey League.

In 1970, West became the television announcer for the Chicago Black Hawks. From 1971 to 1976, he also called Cubs games for the station.

In 1978, the Washington Capitals chose West to call the team's games on WDCA-TV. From 1983 to 1990, West co-hosted the Jones and West Morning Show with Bob Jones. From 1984 to 1986, West was the play-by-play announcer for Maryland Terrapins football games. His final full-time job in broadcasting was the sports anchor role for WBAL Radio's morning show. He retired in 1995 and was replaced by Pam Ward.

Jim West died on July 31, 2024, at the age of 95.
