= Oscar Zamora (baseball) =

Cuban baseball player (born 1944)

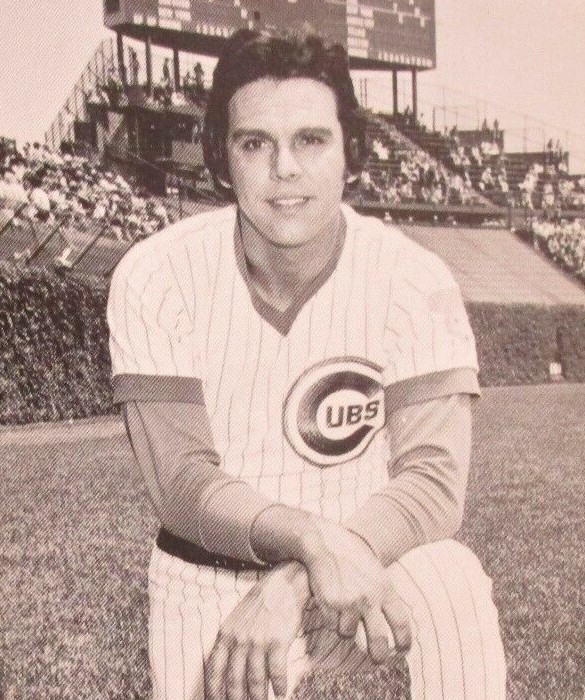
- Pitcher
- Born: September 23, 1944; Camagüey, Cuba
- Died: July 20, 2021 (aged 76); San Juan, Puerto Rico
- Batted: Right Threw: Right

MLB debut
- June 18, 1974, for the Chicago Cubs

Last MLB appearance
- July 21, 1978, for the Houston Astros

MLB statistics
- Win–loss record: 13–14
- Earned run average: 4.53
- Strikeouts: 99
- Stats at Baseball Reference

Teams
- Chicago Cubs (1974–1976); Houston Astros (1978)

Oscar José Zamora Sosa (born September 23, 1944, died July 2, 2021) is a Cuban former professional baseball player. A right-handed pitcher, he played all or part of four seasons in Major League Baseball, playing for the Chicago Cubs during 1974–76, and the Houston Astros in 1978.

In his career, he had 13 wins against 14 losses, and an earned run average of 4.53. His lack of success as a pitcher led to a chant, sung to the tune of "That's Amore": When the pitch is so fat / That the ball hits the bat / That's Zamora.

After his Major League career was over, Zamora then pitched for the Miami Amigos of the Inter-American League in 1979. Zamora was running a shoe business at the time, so he only attended games when he was pitching.
