= Steve Stone (baseball) =

American MLB pitcher and announcer (born 1947)

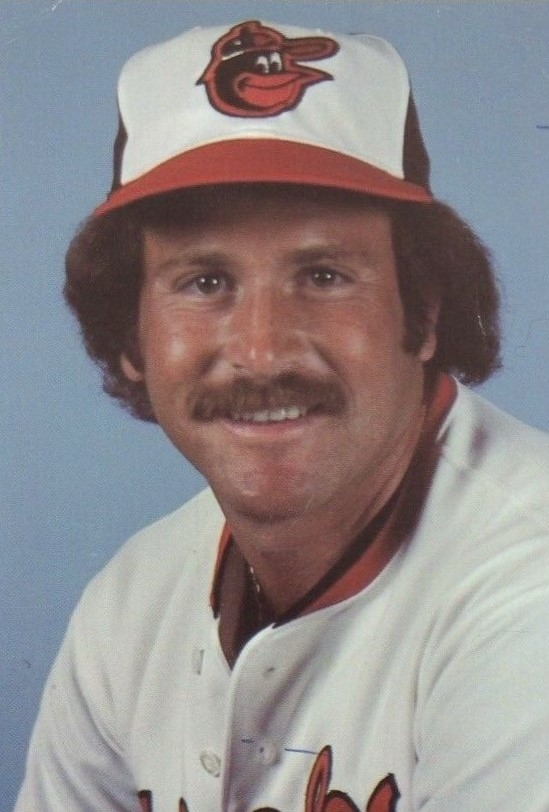
- Stone with the Baltimore Orioles in 1979
- Pitcher
- Born: July 14, 1947 (age 79); South Euclid, Ohio, U.S.
- Batted: Right Threw: Right

MLB debut
- April 8, 1971, for the San Francisco Giants

Last MLB appearance
- September 29, 1981, for the Baltimore Orioles

MLB statistics
- Win–loss record: 107–93
- Earned run average: 3.97
- Strikeouts: 1,065
- Stats at Baseball Reference

Teams
- San Francisco Giants (1971–1972); Chicago White Sox (1973); Chicago Cubs (1974–1976); Chicago White Sox (1977–1978); Baltimore Orioles (1979–1981)

Career highlights and awards
- All-Star (1980); AL Cy Young Award (1980); MLB wins leader (1980)

Steven Michael Stone (born July 14, 1947) is an American former Major League Baseball (MLB) player and current sportscaster and author.

Stone pitched for four MLB teams between 1971 and 1981. In 1980, he was the AL Cy Young Award winner and an American League All Star, finishing the season with a record of 25–7 for the Baltimore Orioles. He was WGN-TV's color commentator for Chicago Cubs broadcasts between 1983 and 2004, missing a couple of seasons late in his tenure due to health problems. He worked in radio until 2009, when he became the color commentator for Chicago White Sox television broadcasts.

== Early life ==
Stone is Jewish, and was born in South Euclid, Ohio, a Cleveland suburb, to Dorothy (a waitress) and Paul Stone (who changed records in juke boxes, and later became an insurance salesman), who were Orthodox Jews. His maternal grandfather, Edward Manheim, lived to see Stone celebrate his bar mitzvah in September 1960. Stone played high school ball at Charles F. Brush High School for baseball Coach Jim Humpall. He also won several tennis championships, was a ping pong champion, and was a proficient golfer.

At Kent State University, Stone was an outstanding pitcher and his catcher was Thurman Munson. He was selected to the All Mid-American Conference team, and was named team captain as a junior. He had a 2.00 ERA for the Chatham Anglers in the Cape Cod League in 1968. He also starred on the bowling, volleyball, and tennis teams. He joined Alpha Epsilon Pi fraternity. He graduated in 1970 with a teaching degree in history and government.

== Draft and minor leagues ==
In 1968, he was drafted by the Cleveland Indians in the 16th round of the draft, although did not sign.

In February 1969, he was drafted by the San Francisco Giants in the fourth round of the draft (secondary phase).

From 1969–1971, Stone pitched in the minor leagues.

In 1969, he pitched for the Fresno Giants, in 1970 for the Phoenix Giants and Amarillo Giants, and in 1971 again for Phoenix. He compiled a 32–24 record, and struck out nearly a batter per inning.

== Major league career ==
=== San Francisco Giants (1971–72) ===
Breaking the stereotype of ballplayers in his era, Stone said:

Charlie Fox (manager of the Giants in 1971) felt the only way a ballplayer could perform was to chew tobacco, wear a sloppy uniform and, as he put it, not be afraid to get a bloody nose, and eat, drink and sleep baseball. I never thought a bloody nose was all that comfortable, and tobacco upsets my stomach. I like to eat – but not baseball – and I never thought sleeping with the game would be all that enjoyable. I think he thought reading hurt your eyes.

Ron Fimrite mused in Sports Illustrated in May 1971 that Stone was "a Jewish intellectual … who just might be a right-handed (Sandy) Koufax."

In 1972 he was 6–8 with a 2.98 ERA. After suffering a sore arm, Stone was traded by the Giants with Ken Henderson to the Chicago White Sox for Tom Bradley on November 29, 1972.

=== Chicago White Sox (1973) ===
In 1973, he was 6-11 with a 4.24 ERA, and was fourth in the AL in strikeouts per 9 innings pitched (7.04), and 8th in hit batsmen (7).

=== Chicago Cubs (1974–1976) ===
Stone was acquired along with Steve Swisher and Ken Frailing by the Chicago Cubs from the crosstown White Sox for Ron Santo on December 11, 1973. Jim Kremmel was also sent to the Cubs to complete the transaction one week later on December 18. In 1974 he was 8–5 with a 4.14 ERA. In 1975 he was 12–8 with a 3.95 ERA, and pitched 214.3 innings.

=== Chicago White Sox (1977–78) ===
In November 1976, after suffering a torn rotator cuff and undertaking cryotherapy after refusing surgery and cortisone injections, he signed as a free agent with the Chicago White Sox for $60,000 ($430,000 today), turning down offers from four other teams.

In 1977, he was 15–12 with a 4.51 ERA in 207.1 innings. During that year on August 29, Stone gave up a home run to Cleveland Indians second baseman Duane Kuiper – Kuiper's only career home run in 3,379 at bats. In 1978, when he was paid $125,000 ($617,000 today), he was 12–12 with a 4.37 ERA in 212 innings.

=== Baltimore Orioles (1979–1981) ===
In November 1978, he signed a 4-year, $760,000 ($3,752,000 today) deal as a free agent with the Baltimore Orioles, again turning down four other offers. In 1979 Stone was 11–7 with a 3.77 ERA in 186 innings, and was 7th in the league in fewest hits allowed per 9 innings pitched (8.37).

His best year was 1980, when he went 25–7 (.781) for the Orioles, won the Cy Young Award and The Sporting News Pitcher of the Year Award, and came in 9th in the AL MVP voting. Stone's relief pitchers did not blow a save for him all season until his last start of the year. He led the league in wins (his 25 wins set a team record) and won-lost percentage, and was second in games started (37), seventh in ERA (3.23), strikeouts (149), hits allowed/9 IP (8.04), and hit batsmen (6), and ninth in innings pitched (250.7). He also won the American League June 1980 Pitcher of the Month Award. He also started and pitched three perfect innings in the All-Star Game that year.

"I knew it would ruin my arm. But one year of 25–7 is worth five of 15–15."

— Stone, on throwing over 50% curveballs in 1980

Stone threw as many as 73 curveballs in a game at least twice that season, even though he knew he might damage his pitching arm.

"I used to try not to lose before", Stone said in 1980. "Now, when I go out, I go out to win every time, and I'm certain I am. I try to envision myself literally walking off the mound a winner. I allow no negatives in my thinking. When certain ones start creeping in, I erase them and make it like a blank blackboard waiting to be filled in with things like, 'The team is going to play well, is going to score some runs, I'm going to throw strikes, I'm going to win.' "

After his Cy Young season, the pitcher who was listed as 5' 10" commented:

All my life, because of my size, people have been telling me what I couldn't do. They said I was too small and not durable enough. First they said I'd never pitch in high school. Then they said I'd never pitch in college. Then they said okay, but you'll never pitch professionally. Then they said well, maybe you're pitching professionally but you'll never make it out of the minors. When I got to the majors, they said well, you may be in the majors but you'll never be good. Now those same people are saying I won't have a good year this year. That kind of thing is reiterated by people who've never achieved a great deal themselves.

Stone suffered from shoulder tendinitis in 1981, going 4–7 with a 4.60 ERA. He appeared in a pair of spring training contests before going on the disabled list on March 21, 1982. He announced his retirement as an active player 2 1/2 months later on June 2 due to recurring arm problems. His MLB career record was 107–93, 40–21 with the Orioles for a .656 winning percentage which was the best ever by a Baltimore pitcher over a three-year span.

He is considered one of the best Jewish pitchers in major league history. Through July 2011, Stone was third among Jewish pitchers in career wins (107) and strikeouts (1,065), behind Ken Holtzman and Sandy Koufax and directly ahead of Jason Marquis, and ninth in games pitched (320), behind Barry Latman. Reminiscing about Sandy Koufax's influence on him and others when he was a child, he said, "He gave little Jewish boys some hope."

== Sportscasting career (1982–present) ==
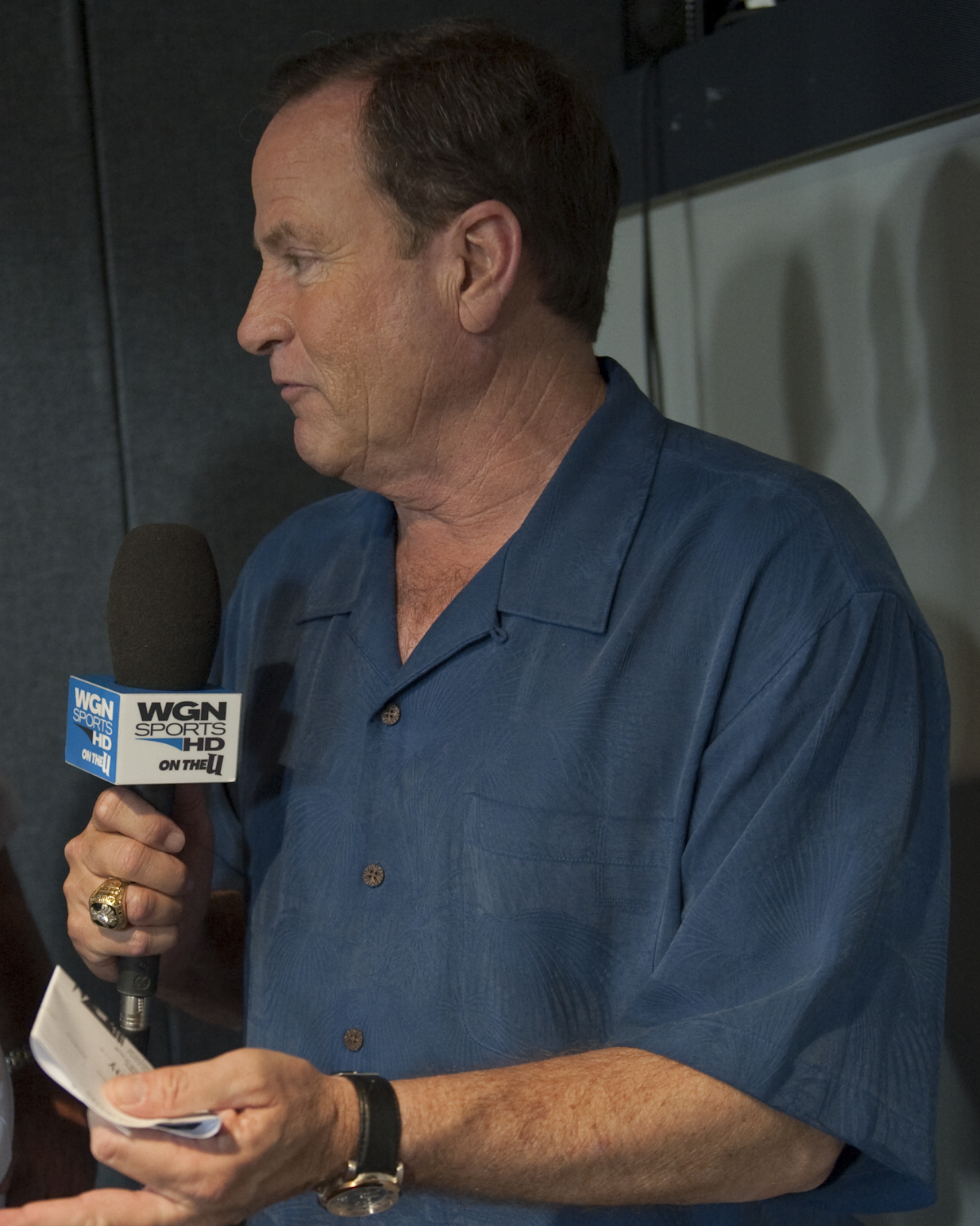
Stone announcing with WGN Sports in 2010

=== Monday Night Baseball / ABC Sports (1982) ===
Following his retirement, Stone was hired by ABC to serve as a color commentator for their Monday Night Baseball telecasts. Stone was normally paired with Al Michaels and Bob Uecker in the booth.

=== Chicago Cubs / WGN (1983–2004) ===
In 1983, Stone became a color commentator for the WGN television broadcasts of the Chicago Cubs, teaming for 14 years with Hall of Fame announcer Harry Caray. In 1985, he posed for Playgirl. After Harry Caray's death in February 1998, Stone was paired with Caray's grandson Chip Caray. Stone left the booth for health reasons in 2000, including a case of coccidioidomycosis (Valley fever) and kidney stones, and returned to the Cubs booth in 2003 and 2004.

Stone temporally took over play-by-play duties from Caray while the latter was recovering from a stroke at the start of the 1987 season. WGN announced that until Caray was well enough to return, guest announcers would fill in and sit alongside Stone.

On August 7, 1993, Stone provided commentary alongside Jim Kaat for a Cubs game against the St. Louis Cardinals for CBS.

=== Leaving the Cubs booth ===
Stone refused a contract extension as the Cubs color-man after the 2004 season amid a controversy involving Cubs players who felt he was being overly critical of their performance. Even so, he was a fan favorite. One reason he was so well-liked was his ability to predict with accuracy what might happen in various game situations, explaining to the audience why the strategy or pitch would be successful prior to the play. A famous example of this was him expressing "I wouldn't pitch to this guy" in a 2004 game, seconds before the batter (Adam Dunn) hit a home run off Cubs pitcher Mike Remlinger to give the Cincinnati Reds the lead.

Stone expressed frustration with Cubs manager Dusty Baker for not controlling his players. At one point during the 2004 season, Kent Mercker called the broadcast booth from the bullpen during a game to complain about comments made, also confronting Stone in a hotel lobby. Among the comments that reportedly irked Mercker were Chip Caray's praise of Houston Astros pitcher Roy Oswalt. It was also reported that Mercker and left fielder Moisés Alou shouted at Stone on a team charter plane to a road game in 2004, and that Alou tried to have Stone and Caray banned from the team charter flights.

On September 30, 2004, in the wake of a 12-inning loss to the Cincinnati Reds that all but eliminated the Cubs, Stone strongly criticized the team. "The truth of this situation is [this is] an extremely talented bunch of guys who want to look at all directions except where they should really look, and kind of make excuses for what happened. ... This team should have won the wild-card [playoff berth] by six, seven games. No doubt about it." The comments stunned manager Baker and were a factor in Stone's resignation as a Cub broadcaster the following month.

=== Chicago White Sox (2005–present) ===
In early 2005 Stone was hired by Chicago radio station WSCR to provide commentary and host a weekly talk show, hosted on Mondays by Terry Boers and Dan Bernstein, on Tuesdays by Mike North, and on Thursdays by Brian Hanley and Mike Mulligan. He was also hired by ESPN to work some of that network's baseball telecasts.

In early August 2007, Stone filled in for Chicago White Sox color commentator Darrin Jackson, while Jackson took leave for the birth of his child, during which he successfully predicted a walk-off home run by Juan Uribe in extra innings. In October 2007, Stone called postseason games between the Boston Red Sox and Los Angeles Angels of Anaheim for TBS, partnered with play-by-play announcer Ted Robinson. On March 4, 2008, Stone was named the color commentator for White Sox radio broadcasts for the 2008 season on WSCR AM670 The Score, replacing Chris Singleton, who moved to ESPN's Baseball Tonight.

On September 13, 2008, Stone accepted the job as the color commentator for White Sox television broadcasts for six years beginning with the 2009 season. He said he enjoyed being in the booth with Hawk Harrelson, stating that he liked his nickname "Stone Pony." Stone also acted as a fill-in play-by-play announcer when Harrelson wasn't available. He worked with either analysts Tom Paciorek or Tony Graffanino.

After Harrelson's retirement in 2018, Stone was paired with Jason Benetti (who filled in for Harrelson from 2016-2018) on White Sox telecasts from 2019-2023. In 2020, Stone and Benetti were ranked as the 8th best broadcast duo by The Athletic, and they were consistently ranked as an outstanding duo throughout their 5 years together. Benetti, widely recognized as one of the best play-by-play announcers in the MLB, left the White Sox booth after the 2023 season to become the Tigers play-by-play announcer, citing a disrespectful remark from the team's chief revenue and marketing officer Brooks Boyer as an example of his strained relationship with the team's front office.

Since 2024, Stone has been paired with John Schriffen in the White Sox booth. In their first year together, Stone and Schriffen were ranked as the 30th best broadcast duo in the MLB, a sharp fall from the 6th place ranking Stone and Benetti achieved the year prior.

Though some suspected Stone would retire after an abysmal 2024 season for the White Sox, Stone announced during the last week of the regular season that he had agreed on a long-term multi-year deal to remain the color analyst for the White Sox, starting in 2025. In his words, "They signed me to a contract that will pretty much ensure when I do decide to retire, it will be as a member of the Chicago White Sox organization."

== Writing ==
In 1999, Stone, along with Barry Rozner of the Chicago suburban area Daily Herald, authored Where's Harry?, a memoir of his experiences with Harry Caray in the WGN booth.

== See also ==
- List of Jewish Major League Baseball players
- List of Major League Baseball annual wins leaders

== Books ==
- Where's Harry? (1999) (with Barry Rozner) Taylor Publishing; ISBN 0-87833-233-2
- Said In Stone: Your Game, My Way (2011) Triumph Books; ISBN 1-60078-538-7

Preceded by Lou Boudreau; Joe Carter	Chicago Cubs television color commentator 1983–2000; 2003–2004	Succeeded by Joe Carter; Bob Brenly
