= Tom Dettore =

American baseball player (born 1947)

- Pitcher
- Born: November 17, 1947 (age 78); Canonsburg, Pennsylvania, U.S.
- Batted: Left Threw: Right

MLB debut
- June 11, 1973, for the Pittsburgh Pirates

Last MLB appearance
- April 21, 1976, for the Chicago Cubs

MLB statistics
- Win–loss record: 8–11
- Earned run average: 5.21
- Strikeouts: 106
- Stats at Baseball Reference

Teams
- Pittsburgh Pirates (1973); Chicago Cubs (1974–1976)

Thomas Anthony Dettore, Jr. (born November 17, 1947) is an American former Major League Baseball pitcher for the Pittsburgh Pirates (1973) and Chicago Cubs (1974–1976).

From 1988–1995, Dettore was a pitching coach in the Pirates minor league system. He then became the Pirates minor league pitching coordinator. On January 13, 2009, he was named the pitching coach for the Double-A West Tenn Diamond Jaxx in the Seattle Mariners organization. After the 2009 season, he was named the pitching coach for the Class-A Advanced High Desert Mavericks of the California League.
