= Gulf Coast League Cubs =

- (1972-1982, 1993-1996); Fort Myers, Florida (1994-1996); Port St. Lucie, Florida (1993); Sarasota, Florida (1979-1982); Bradenton, Florida (1972-1978)

Minor league affiliations
- Previous classes: Rookie
- Previous leagues: Gulf Coast League

Major league affiliations
- Previous teams: Chicago Cubs

Minor league titles
- League titles (2): 1972; 1974
- Division titles (1): 1996

Team data
- Name: GCL Cubs

The Gulf Coast League Cubs, or GCL Cubs, were a minor league baseball team that played in the Gulf Coast League from 1972 to 1982 and again from 1993 to 1996.

The team was affiliated with the Chicago Cubs and won GCL titles in 1972 (shared with the GCL Royals) and 1974.

== See also ==
- Gulf Coast Cubs players
- Arizona League Cubs
