= Steve Swisher =

American baseball player (born 1951)

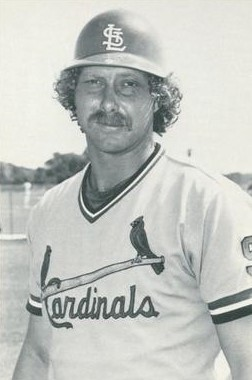
- Catcher
- Born: August 9, 1951 (age 74); Parkersburg, West Virginia, U.S.
- Batted: Right Threw: Right

MLB debut
- June 14, 1974, for the Chicago Cubs

Last MLB appearance
- September 26, 1982, for the San Diego Padres

MLB statistics
- Batting average: .216
- Home runs: 20
- Runs batted in: 124
- Stats at Baseball Reference

Teams
- Chicago Cubs (1974–1977); St. Louis Cardinals (1978–1980); San Diego Padres (1981–1982)

Career highlights and awards
- All-Star (1976)

Steven Eugene Swisher (born August 9, 1951) is an American former professional baseball player and minor league manager. He played in Major League Baseball as a catcher for the Chicago Cubs, St. Louis Cardinals, and San Diego Padres from 1974 to 1982. Swisher was elected to the 1976 National League All-Star team with the Cubs but did not play in the game. He is the father of former MLB first baseman Nick Swisher.

== College ==
Swisher attended Ohio University for a degree in education and played baseball. During his freshman season, the team went to the College World Series. Swisher was named an all-Mid-American Conference player for three of his seasons.

== Major league career ==
Swisher was drafted in the first round in June 1973 by the Chicago White Sox. He spent his first year of professional baseball with the Knoxville Sox and six games with the Iowa Oaks, batting .211 and .286 respectively. He was traded along with Steve Stone and Ken Frailing from the White Sox to the crosstown Cubs for Ron Santo on December 11, 1973. Jim Kremmel was also sent to the Cubs to complete the transaction one week later on December 18. Swisher was selected as the Cubs' representative for the 1976 MLB All-Star Game; he hit .236 that season with five home runs and 42 runs batted in. In a 2014 piece for ESPN.com, Jim Caple listed Swisher as one of the "five worst players named All-Stars".

Swisher, who had appeared in 109 games in his All-Star season, saw his playing time drop to 74 games in 1977, while batting just .190 with five home runs. In December 1977, he was traded to the St. Louis Cardinals in a four-player deal and played sparingly over the next three seasons. In late 1980, he was sent to the San Diego Padres in a multiplayer trade. Swisher never appeared in more than 45 games in a season with the Cardinals or Padres. He was granted free agency after the 1982 season and never played in the major leagues again.

== Managerial career ==
Swisher spent several seasons as a minor league manager. He started in Class A with the Waterloo Indians in 1985 and 1986. He managed Class AA and Class AAA teams in the Cleveland Indians organization through 1988, including the Buffalo Bisons, Williamsport Bills and Colorado Springs Sky Sox. Swisher moved to the New York Mets organization in 1989, where he managed the Class AA Jackson Mets. In 1991, Swisher was the manager of the Tidewater Tides, and he held the same position with the Binghamton Mets in 1992 and 1993.

He subsequently spent single seasons as the manager of the Class AAA New Orleans Zephyrs (1997) and Class AA Reading Phillies (2005). After being hired by Reading in late 2004, Swisher suffered a fall down a staircase and was rendered comatose. He had recovered enough to manage Reading in 2005, but his tenure there was punctuated by personality conflicts and the team did not renew his contract after that season.

Preceded by First Manager	Williamsport Bills Manager; 1987	Succeeded by Mike Hargrove
Preceded by First Manager	Colorado Springs Sky Sox Manager; 1988	Succeeded by Mike Hargrove
Preceded by First Manager	Binghamton Mets Manager; 1992 & 1993	Succeeded by John Tamargo
