= José Cardenal =

Cuban baseball player (born 1943)

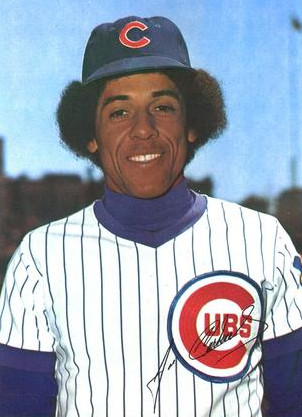
- Outfielder
- Born: October 7, 1943 (age 82); Matanzas, Cuba
- Batted: Right Threw: Right

MLB debut
- April 14, 1963, for the San Francisco Giants

Last MLB appearance
- October 3, 1980, for the Kansas City Royals

MLB statistics
- Batting average: .275
- Home runs: 138
- Runs batted in: 775
- Stats at Baseball Reference

Teams
- As player: San Francisco Giants (1963–1964); Los Angeles / California Angels (1965–1967); Cleveland Indians (1968–1969); St. Louis Cardinals (1970–1971); Milwaukee Brewers (1971); Chicago Cubs (1972–1977); Philadelphia Phillies (1978–1979); New York Mets (1979–1980); Kansas City Royals (1980); As coach: Cincinnati Reds (1993); St. Louis Cardinals (1994–1995); New York Yankees (1996–1999); Tampa Bay Devil Rays (2000–2001); Cincinnati Reds (2002–2003)

Career highlights and awards
- 3× World Series champion (1996, 1998, 1999); Chicago Cubs Hall of Fame

José Rosario Domec Cardenal (born October 7, 1943) is a Cuban American former professional baseball player and coach. He played in Major League Baseball as an outfielder from 1963 to 1980, most prominently as a member of the Chicago Cubs, with whom he established himself as a fan favorite for his powerful hitting and his strong throwing arm. He had the best seasons of his career in Chicago, posting career highs in home runs and batting average as a member of the Cubs.

After his playing career, Cardenal worked as a coach for several major league organizations and participated in three World Series as the first base coach for the New York Yankees. Cardenal was inducted into the Chicago Cubs Hall of Fame in 2022.

== Playing career ==
Cardenal was born in Matanzas, Cuba, where he grew up playing baseball with his second cousin and future major league player Bert Campaneris. He started his major league career with the San Francisco Giants in 1963 and was sent to the California Angels before the 1965 season. He finished second in the American League with 37 stolen bases, then was dealt to the Cleveland Indians for Chuck Hinton on November 29, 1967. He led the Indians twice in steals twice with a career-high 40 in 1968. In that season, he tied a major league record for outfielders by making two unassisted double plays. Traded to the St. Louis Cardinals in 1970, he hit .293 with 74 RBI. In a 1971 season split between the Cardinals and the Milwaukee Brewers, he collected a career-high 80 RBI. He was traded by the Brewers to the Cubs for Jim Colborn, Brock Davis, and Earl Stephenson on December 3, 1971.

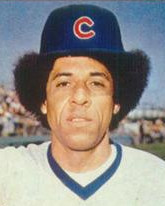
Cardenal, circa 1977

In 1973 as a right fielder for the Cubs, Cardenal led the team in batting average (.303), doubles (33) and stolen bases (19), being named Cubs Player of the Year by the Chicago baseball writers. Famously temperamental, in 1974 Cardenal was at odds with the Cubs management, and notoriously refused to play the season opener claiming that he was injured because the eyelids of one eye were stuck open. In 1975 he posted career-highs in average (.317) and hits (182).

He had another good season in 1976, batting .299 with 8 home runs and 47 RBI. On May 2, Cardenal went 6-for-7 in a 6–5 win over San Francisco in 14 innings at Candlestick Park. He slumped in 1977, batting only .239 with just 3 home runs and 18 RBI in 100 games played.

Cardenal played with the Philadelphia Phillies during the 1978 and 1979 seasons. He was the last player to wear uniform number 1 for the team, which retired the number in honor of Richie Ashburn during the 1979 season. The Phillies sent Cardenal to the New York Mets on August 2, 1979, between games of a twi-night double header featuring the two teams. Cardenal was a member of the Phillies for the first game and switched uniforms and dugouts to join the Mets for the second. He played for the New York Mets for the balance of the 1979 season and was there for most of the 1980 campaign. He was released by the Mets in August of that year. He later signed with the Kansas City Royals, ending his major league career with the Royals during the 1980 World Series.

In an 18-season career, Cardenal was a .275 hitter with 138 home runs and 775 RBI in 2017 games played. In addition, he collected 1913 hits, 936 runs, 333 doubles, 46 triples, 329 stolen bases and 608 bases on balls. Defensively, he recorded an overall .978 fielding percentage.

== Coaching career ==
Cardenal coached for the Reds, Cardinals, Yankees, and Devil Rays. He was the first base coach for the Yankees run of World Championships in 1996, 1998, and 1999. He resigned from his position with the Yankees prior to the 2000 season over a contract dispute.

Cardenal became the senior advisor to the Washington Nationals general manager in 2005. On September 14, he announced that he wanted to help the victims of Hurricane Katrina, and was seeking to auction his World Series ring he won with the New York Yankees in 1998. Cardenal was relieved of his position with the Nationals following the 2009 season.

== Cultural impact ==
First Lady Michelle Obama hugged Cardenal during the Chicago Cubs January, 2017 visit to the White House. The team and some veterans were invited there to celebrate their 2016 World Series victory. Native Chicagaon Obama said she wore her Cubs hat on top of her oversized Afro the same way Cardenal had during his career, as seen in the photo above.

== See also ==
- List of Major League Baseball players from Cuba
- List of Major League Baseball career stolen bases leaders
- List of Major League Baseball single-game hits leaders
- List of St. Louis Cardinals coaches
- List of Cuban Americans

Sporting positions
Preceded by Ron Oester	Cincinnati Reds First Base Coach; 1993	Succeeded by Joel Youngblood
Preceded by Jack Hubbard	St. Louis Cardinals First Base Coach; 1994–1995	Succeeded by Dave McKay
Preceded by Brian Butterfield	New York Yankees First Base Coach; 1996–1999	Succeeded by Lee Mazzilli
Preceded by Billy Hatcher	Tampa Bay Rays First Base Coach; 2000–2001	Succeeded by Lee May
Preceded by Bill Doran	Cincinnati Reds First Base Coach; 2002–2003	Succeeded by Randy Whisler
