= Bill Madlock =

American baseball player (born 1951)

- Madlock in 1984
- Third baseman
- Born: January 12, 1951 (age 75); Memphis, Tennessee, U.S.
- Batted: Right Threw: Right

Professional debut
- MLB: September 7, 1973, for the Texas Rangers
- NPB: April 8, 1988, for the Lotte Orions

Last appearance
- MLB: October 4, 1987, for the Detroit Tigers
- NPB: October 23, 1988, for the Lotte Orions

MLB statistics
- Batting average: .305
- Hits: 2,008
- Home runs: 163
- Runs batted in: 860

NPB statistics
- Batting average: .263
- Home runs: 19
- Runs batted in: 61
- Stats at Baseball Reference

Teams
- Texas Rangers (1973); Chicago Cubs (1974–1976); San Francisco Giants (1977–1979); Pittsburgh Pirates (1979–1985); Los Angeles Dodgers (1985–1987); Detroit Tigers (1987); Lotte Orions (1988)

Career highlights and awards
- 3× All-Star (1975, 1981, 1983); World Series champion (1979); 4× NL batting champion (1975, 1976, 1981, 1983)

Bill "Mad Dog" Madlock, Jr. (born January 12, 1951) is an American former professional baseball player and coach. He played in Major League Baseball as a third baseman from 1973 to 1987. Madlock is notable for being a four-time National League batting champion. His four batting titles as a third baseman was a record until Wade Boggs attained his fifth in 1988. Since 1970, only Tony Gwynn has won more National League batting titles (eight). Madlock is also one of only three right-handed hitters to have won multiple National League batting titles since 1960, Roberto Clemente having also won four and Tommy Davis having won back-to-back titles in 1962 and 1963.

== Early life and family ==
Bill Madlock was born in Memphis, Tennessee, but grew up in Decatur, Illinois, where he graduated from Eisenhower High School.

At Eisenhower High he played basketball, football and baseball. He received 150 scholarship offers for his skills as a basketball player, around 100 for his skills as a football player and two for his skills as a baseball player. He accepted one of the two baseball scholarships, at Southeastern Community College in Keokuk, Iowa, because of his preference for playing a less hazardous game. His reasoning was clear from what he later told a Sports Illustrated reporter: "I didn't want to have 6'5", 250-pound guys bearing down on me, so I decided to play baseball."

He was considered for the baseball draft by the St. Louis Cardinals in 1969, but would not sign with the Cardinals. By the time Madlock was ready to sign with a major league baseball team, he had decided to go with an offer from the Washington Senators organization.

Madlock has four children with his late wife Cynthia: Sara, Stephen, Douglas and Jeremy.

== Career ==
In a 15-season career, covering 1806 games, Madlock, nicknamed "Mad Dog", compiled a .305 batting average with 2008 hits, 920 runs, 348 doubles, 163 home runs, 174 stolen bases, 605 bases on balls and 860 runs batted in (RBI).

=== Early years ===
1974 photo of Madlock for Chicago Cubs

Madlock was drafted by the Washington Senators in the 5th round of the secondary phase of the 1970 amateur draft. After spending a few years in the minor leagues, with a season with the Ossining Oxen in the team's only season, he made his debut with the Texas Rangers (who had moved from Washington after the 1971 season) on September 7, 1973, and played 21 games with them, batting .351. Prior to his promotion, he led the Pacific Coast League in total bases (268) and runs scored (119), finished second in batting (.338) and had 22 homers and 90 RBI at Triple-A Spokane. He was traded along with Vic Harris from the Rangers to the Chicago Cubs for Ferguson Jenkins on October 25, 1973. His new manager with the Cubs Whitey Lockman said about him, "Our scouts are extremely high on Madlock as being one of the best hitting prospects they have seen in some time." Madlock replaced Ron Santo as the Cubs' third baseman and hit .313, the highest average for a Cubs third baseman since Stan Hack batted .323 in 1945. In 1975 Madlock won his first batting title with a .354 average. On July 26 of that year he went 6-for-6 during a Cubs' loss to the New York Mets. He also made the first of his three All-Star appearances and shared Game MVP honors with Jon Matlack.

=== Batting averages ===
In 1976 Madlock repeated as batting champion with a .339 average, edging out Ken Griffey Sr. of the Cincinnati Reds on the final day of the regular season (October 3, 1976). In an 8–2 win over the Montreal Expos, Madlock collected four singles to raise his average from .333 to .339, one point ahead of Griffey. Griffey belatedly entered his team's game (which the Reds won 11–1 over the Atlanta Braves), and went 0-for-2, dropping his average to .336.

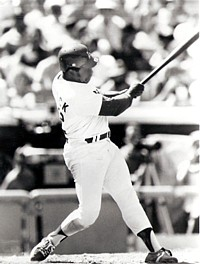
Madlock at bat in 1986

During the advent of MLB free agency following the 1976 season, Madlock demanded a multiyear contract with an annual salary of about $200,000, but was rejected by team owner Philip K. Wrigley who then announced that Madlock would be traded "to anyone foolish enough to want him." In what was considered one of the five worst trades in Cubs history by the Chicago Tribune's Chris Kuc in 2016, Madlock and Rob Sperring were dealt to the San Francisco Giants for Bobby Murcer, Steve Ontiveros and minor-league right-handed pitcher Andy Muhlstock on February 11, 1977. Madlock, an average fielder at best, was moved to second base (the Giants already had Darrell Evans at third), and batted "only" .302 and .309 in 1977 and 1978 respectively.

Madlock was acquired along with Lenny Randle and Dave Roberts by the Pittsburgh Pirates from the Giants for Al Holland, Ed Whitson and Fred Breining on June 28, 1979 in what Dave Kindred described as "a midsummer deal that still doesn't make sense." He was a starting third baseman again on a ballclub that eventually won the 1979 World Series. He batted .328 with the Pirates during the regular season and .375 in the World Series.

In 1980 Madlock's average dropped to .277 as the Pirates finished third in the National League East, eight games behind the eventual World Champion Philadelphia Phillies. For Madlock, the season became infamous for an incident during a May 1 game against the Montreal Expos at Three Rivers Stadium. Madlock poked umpire Jerry Crawford in the face with his glove after being called out on strikes with the bases loaded. National League President Chub Feeney fined Madlock $5,000 and suspended him 15 games. Madlock appealed the suspension and remained in uniform before finally serving the suspension on June 6, after National League umpires threatened to eject him from every game he tried to play in.

=== Batting titles ===
Madlock won two more batting titles, in 1981 and 1983, making him the first player to win multiple batting titles with two different teams. He also finished second in the National League in batting in 1982, his .319 average bettered only by Al Oliver's .331. Afterwards, however, his play mirrored the decline of the team. In August 1985 the Pirates traded him to Los Angeles which, like Pittsburgh in 1979, was contending for a division title. The Dodgers lost to the St. Louis Cardinals in the NLCS but Madlock hit three home runs in the loss. In 1987, the Dodgers released Madlock, who signed a few days later with the Detroit Tigers, hitting .279 with 14 home runs and 50 RBI in 87 games including a three home run game on June 28, where he again earned a trip to the postseason. On September 23, he collected his 2,000th career hit off Bruce Hurst at Fenway Park. In the 1987 ALCS, he went 0-for-5 with three strikeouts as the Tigers lost to the Minnesota Twins. Madlock became a free agent at the end of the 1987 season and played for the Lotte Orions in Japan in 1988.

Madlock's four batting titles is the most of any player in major league baseball history who is not enshrined in the Hall of Fame. He is one of 102 players in MLB history with 2,000 hits and a batting average of .300.

=== "Mad Dog" ===
Madlock also had a fiery temper, and was involved in several incidents (including the 1980 episode) that exemplified it:

- August 16, 1975: In the first inning of a game against the Houston Astros at the Astrodome, Madlock was ejected for arguing with umpire Art Williams on a close play at first base in which Madlock was called out. He was ejected by not only Williams but also home plate umpire Bruce Froemming, who overheard Madlock's angry profanity-laden tirade.
- May 1, 1976: Madlock was fined $500 for charging the mound after San Francisco pitcher Jim Barr brushed him back with a pitch during a game at Candlestick Park.
- Spring training, 1978: Madlock, as a Giant, got into a clubhouse fight with John Montefusco after interrupting an interview with the pitcher. Afterwards, Madlock ripped Montefusco: "I've heard and read where Montefusco has said this team is a team of losers."

As a player, Madlock was ejected from 18 games. He was also ejected from three games during his two years as a Tiger coach.

Over time, Madlock's approach to umpires changed. Umpire Jerry Crawford remarked after his 1980 dispute with Madlock that "[t]here's no question [Madlock has] calmed down. He's changed, which is great, because a guy of his ability doesn't have to do the things to umpires that he was doing." Madlock's agent, Stephen Greenberg, son of baseball great Hank Greenberg, added that "[t]he Crawford incident was a benchmark. Now if he disagrees with an umpire, he uses his charm, which can be considerable."

== Post-playing career ==
In 2000 and 2001, Madlock was a coach with the Detroit Tigers, reuniting with Tigers manager and former Pirates teammate Phil Garner. In 2001, Madlock was invited by Omar Moreno, another former Pirate teammate, to coach in a professional league in Panama City, Panama. In 2003, Madlock was hired to manage the Newark Bears of the independent Atlantic League; the team went 117–134 during his two seasons. In 2013, he was announced as the manager of the Independent League Tiffin Saints.

On Saturday, August 27, 2016, Madlock was inducted into the Decatur Public Schools (Decatur, IL) Athletic Hall of Fame during its inaugural ceremony at Frank M. Lindsay Field at Millikin University during the annual MacArthur-Eisenhower Tate & Lyle Braggin’ Rights Football Game.

== See also ==
- List of Major League Baseball career hits leaders
- Major League Baseball titles leaders
- List of Major League Baseball batting champions
- List of Major League Baseball career stolen bases leaders
- List of Major League Baseball single-game hits leaders

Preceded by Dan Driessen	Topps Rookie All-Star Third Baseman; 1974	Succeeded by Larry Parrish
