= Rick Reuschel =

American baseball player (born 1949)

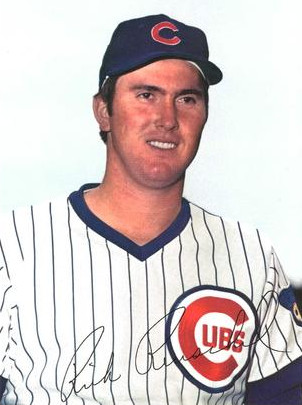
- Reuschel with the Chicago Cubs in 1973
- Pitcher
- Born: May 16, 1949 (age 77); Quincy, Illinois, U.S.
- Batted: Right Threw: Right

MLB debut
- June 19, 1972, for the Chicago Cubs

Last MLB appearance
- April 22, 1991, for the San Francisco Giants

MLB statistics
- Win–loss record: 214–191
- Earned run average: 3.37
- Strikeouts: 2,015
- Stats at Baseball Reference

Teams
- Chicago Cubs (1972–1981); New York Yankees (1981); Chicago Cubs (1983–1984); Pittsburgh Pirates (1985–1987); San Francisco Giants (1987–1991)

Career highlights and awards
- 3× All-Star (1977, 1987, 1989); 2× Gold Glove Award (1985, 1987); Chicago Cubs Hall of Fame; San Francisco Giants Wall of Fame

Rickey Eugene Reuschel (/ˈrʌʃəl/ RUSH-əl; born May 16, 1949) is an American former professional baseball player. He played in Major League Baseball as a right-handed pitcher from 1972 to 1991, winning 214 games with a career 3.37 ERA. His nickname was "Big Daddy" because his speed belied his portly physique. He was known for his deceptive style of pitching, which kept hitters off balance by constantly varying the speeds of his pitches.

Reuschel was listed as 6-foot-4 and 225 pounds. Reuschel could run surprisingly well for his size (logging four triples in his batting career) and he was frequently used as a pinch runner on days he was not pitching. He was also a fair—though awkward-looking—hitter, batting well over .200 several times. His older brother Paul Reuschel also pitched for the Cubs from 1975 to 1978, as Rick's teammate. Paul's career ended with the Cleveland Indians in 1979. The Reuschel brothers were Illinois farm boys, with strong physiques and plain-spoken ways. The two are the only siblings to combine on a shutout. On August 21, 1975, Rick started and went 6 1/3 innings against the Los Angeles Dodgers, followed by Paul, who pitched the final 2 2/3 innings for the Cubs' 7–0 win.

== Minor League Career ==
Reuschel attended Central High School in Camp Point, Illinois. After high school he played at Western Illinois University in Macomb, Illinois. Rueschel was the Cubs 3rd Round pick (#67) in the 1970 Amateur Draft out of Western Illinois, after he went 10-0 with a 1.29 ERA as a junior in 1969.

In 1970, Reuschel went 9-2 with a 3.53 ERA in fourteen starts for the Class A Huron Cubs of the Northern League. In 1971, Reuschel went 8-4 with a 2.31 ERA in sixteen starts for the Class AA San Antonio Missions of the Dixie Association, where he was teammates with his older brother, pitcher Paul Reuschel.

With the Class AAA Wichita Aeros of the American Association, Reuschel was 9-2 in twelve starts with a 1.32 ERA, before being called up by the Chicago Cubs to make his major league debut on June 19, 1972.

== Major League career ==
=== Chicago Cubs (1972–1981) ===
Reuschel began his Major League Baseball career when he was drafted in the third round of the 1970 Major League Baseball draft by the Chicago Cubs, at a time when they were declining in the post-Durocher era, and provided a strong arm for the Cubs' increasingly mediocre staff. After spending two years in the minor leagues, he joined the Cubs' major league team in 1972. His best season was in 1977, when the Cubs made a brief run at the pennant. Reuschel won twenty games and finished third in the Cy Young Award voting behind Steve Carlton and Tommy John. In addition, Reuschel pitched in a memorable game for Cub fans on July 28, 1977, when making a rare relief appearance on two days' rest, he entered the 13th inning of a 15–15 tie between the Cubs and the Cincinnati Reds at Wrigley Field. Reuschel retired two batters to end the top of the 13th. Then, he singled and scored the game-winning run in the bottom of the 13th, also picking up the victory in the 16–15 contest.

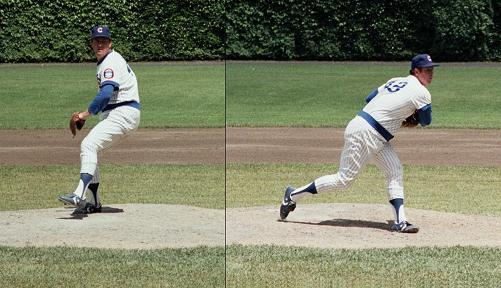
Reuschel in 1981

=== New York Yankees (1981) ===
Reuschel was traded to the New York Yankees in 1981. Reuschel was 4-4 with a 2.67 ERA in eleven starts with the Yankees, pitched six innings, giving up two runs against the Milwaukee Brewers in the AL Division Series, and made his first World Series appearance, with a 4.91 ERA in two games. The 1981 World Series marked the last chapter of the Dodgers-Yankees trilogy of that era, this one won by the Dodgers. Reuschel was ineffective in that Series, and it appeared his career might be finished.

=== Second stint with the Cubs (1983–1984) ===
Reuschel did not pitch in 1982 due to a rotator-cuff injury. He returned to the Cubs and went 6-6 combined in 1983 and 1984, spending a good portion of 1983 rehabbing in the minor leagues.

He returned to the Cubs and was on the roster in 1984 when they won the National League Eastern Division and made the playoffs, but, somewhat controversially, he was not named to the playoff roster.

In twelve total seasons with the Cubs, Reuschel was 135-127 with a 3.50 ERA in 388 games, with 343 starts with 65 complete games.

=== Pittsburgh Pirates (1985–1987) ===
Reuschel was signed by the Pittsburgh Pirates in 1985 as a free agent, and had a 14–8 win–loss record with the last-place Pirates, earning him the National League's Comeback Player of the Year award.

Reuschel was 31-30 with a 3.04 ERA in 91 games with the Pirates.

=== San Francisco Giants (1987–1991) ===
The Pirates traded Reuschel to the San Francisco Giants in late 1987 for Jeff Robinson and Scott Medvin.

Reuschel, finally back with a contender, became the ace of the Giants' staff and helped them make a late run to the National League Western Division title, their first division title since 1971, as well as leading the National League with twelve complete games and four shutouts. He followed that season by winning nineteen games for the Giants in 1988. He was selected to the 1988 All-Star team but declined to participate because he got married on the day of the game to Barbara Thompson, sister of his former Cubs teammate Scot Thompson.

In 1989 at the age of 40, Reuschel was selected as the starting pitcher for the National League in the 1989 All-Star Game, and gave up back-to-back home runs, to Bo Jackson and Wade Boggs, to start the game. Reuschel finished the 1989 season with seventeen wins for the Giants as he helped lead them to the World Series (their first since 1962). In the 1989 World Series, Reuschel was the losing pitcher in Game 2 with an 11.25 ERA, five earned runs, and five hits given up against the Oakland Athletics.

With the Giants, Reuschel was 44-30 with a 3.29 ERA in 96 games.

Reuschel is one of only two pitchers in MLB history (along with Frank Tanana) to give up a home run to both Hank Aaron and Barry Bonds, two of the most prolific home run hitters in baseball history. This is notable because Aaron retired nearly a decade before Barry Bonds reached the major leagues.

== Career statistics ==
W	L	PCT	ERA	G	GS	CG	SHO	SV	IP	H	ER	R	HR	BB	SO	WP	HBP
214	191	.528	3.37	557	529	102	26	5	3548.1	3588	1494	1330	221	935	2015	89	88

In a nineteen-year major league career, Reuschel compiled a record of 214–191 in 557 games (529 starts). He had 102 career complete games and 26 of those were shutouts. He allowed 1,330 earned runs and 2,015 strikeouts in 3,548.1 innings pitched.

Reuschel was a two-time Gold Glove Award winner and a three-time All-Star. Reuschel is tied for 94th with Mark Buehrle on the all-time wins list. Reuschel amassed 68.1 pitching WAR over his career, good for 37th most all-time. Reuschel won the Hutch Award in 1985, and was also a winner of The Sporting News Comeback Player of the Year Award. Reuschel was named to the Baseball Digest 1972 Rookie All-Star team.

== Honors ==
- Reuschel was inducted into the Western Illinois University Hall of Fame in 1982.
- In 2008, Reuschel was inducted, as a charter member, to the San Francisco Giants Wall of Fame.

== See also ==
- List of Major League Baseball career wins leaders
- List of Major League Baseball career hit batsmen leaders
- List of Major League Baseball career strikeout leaders
