= Jim Marshall (baseball) =

American baseball player and manager (1931–2025)

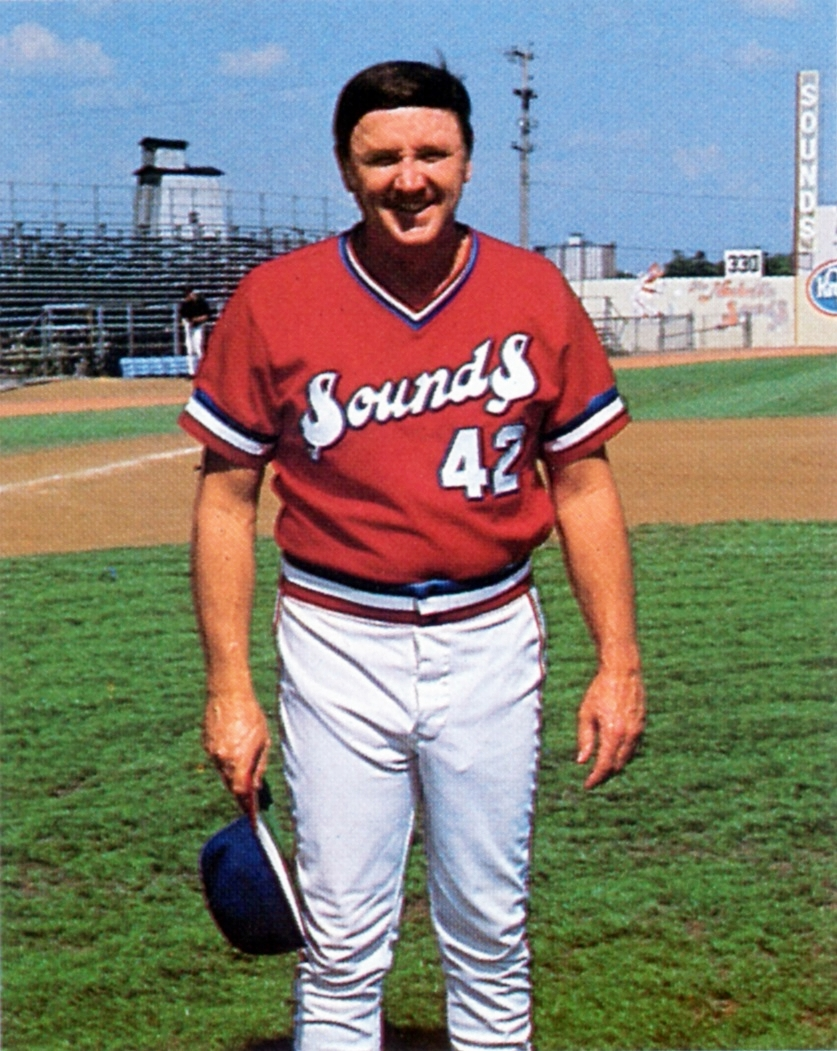
- Marshall with the Nashville Sounds in 1984
- First baseman
- Born: May 25, 1931; Danville, Illinois, U.S.
- Died: September 7, 2025 (aged 94)
- Batted: Left Threw: Left

MLB debut
- April 15, 1958, for the Baltimore Orioles

Last MLB appearance
- September 28, 1962, for the Pittsburgh Pirates

MLB statistics
- Batting average: .242
- Home runs: 29
- Runs batted in: 106
- Managerial record: 229–326
- Winning %: .413

NPB statistics
- Batting average: .268
- Home runs: 78
- Runs batted in: 252
- Stats at Baseball Reference
- Managerial record at Baseball Reference

Teams
- As player: Baltimore Orioles (1958); Chicago Cubs (1958–1959); San Francisco Giants (1960–1961); New York Mets (1962); Pittsburgh Pirates (1962); Chunichi Dragons (1963–1965); As manager: Chicago Cubs (1974–1976); Oakland Athletics (1979)

Rufus James Marshall (May 25, 1931 – September 7, 2025) was an American professional baseball player, manager, and coach. He spent five full years in Major League Baseball as a first baseman, outfielder and pinch hitter for five teams from 1958 through 1962. Then he played in Japan (with the Chunichi Dragons) from 1963 to 1965. After his playing career, Marshall managed the Chicago Cubs (1974–76) and the Oakland Athletics (1979) but never enjoyed a winning season in either post. His career big-league managing record was 229–326 (.413) and his 1979 A's squad lost 108 of 162 games (.333).

== Playing career ==
Born in Danville, Illinois, and raised in Long Beach, California, he threw and batted left-handed and was listed as 6 feet 1 inch (185 cm) tall and 190 pounds (86 kg; 13 st 8 lb). Marshall attended Long Beach State University. After beginning his professional career in 1950, he was a productive hitter during his minor league days in the Pacific Coast League of the 1950s, leading the PCL in home runs (31) and runs batted in (123) as a member of the 1954 Oakland Oaks.

Marshall appeared in 410 MLB games over five seasons (1958–62) and batted .242 with 206 hits and 29 home runs. He recorded a career .994 fielding percentage, committing only nine errors in 1,602 total chances. He was part of the first interleague trade (without waivers) in baseball history when he was dealt by the Cubs with pitcher Dave Hillman to the Boston Red Sox for first baseman Dick Gernert on November 21, 1959.

In addition to the Cubs, he played for the Baltimore Orioles, San Francisco Giants, New York Mets and Pittsburgh Pirates. He never appeared in an official game for the Red Sox, who traded him (in a waiver deal) to the Giants for pitcher Al Worthington during spring training in 1960.

During his three full seasons in Nippon Professional Baseball, Marshall hit 78 home runs in 408 games.

== Management career ==
Marshall became a minor league manager in the Cubs' organization in 1968. After handling Triple-A assignments from 1971 to 1973, he was promoted by the Cubs to MLB third-base coach on the staff of Whitey Lockman for 1974.

On July 25, with Chicago at 41–52, he replaced Lockman as manager. The Cubs went 25–44 over the remainder of the season to finish at 66–96, sixth and last in the National League East Division. Marshall then led the Cubs to successive 75–87 seasons in 1975 and 1976, the Cubs finishing in fifth and then in fourth place. His contract was not renewed, and he was replaced by Herman Franks on November 24, 1976.

He managed at Triple-A for the Montreal Expos and Oakland organizations in 1977–78 before landing his second MLB manager job with the 1979 Athletics. Marshall concluded his managerial career in minor league baseball during the 1980s, working for the New York Yankees (1984) and Chicago White Sox (1986). After his managerial career ended, Marshall scouted the United States for Japanese league teams. He remained in the game as the senior advisor for Pacific Rim operations of the Arizona Diamondbacks.

== Death ==
Marshall died after a short illness on September 7, 2025, at the age of 94.
