= 1922 Chicago Cubs season =

1922 Chicago Cubs
- League: National League
- Ballpark: Cubs Park
- City: Chicago
- Record: 80–74 (.519)
- League place: 5th
- Owners: William Wrigley Jr.
- Managers: Bill Killefer

The 1922 Chicago Cubs season was the 51st season of the Chicago Cubs franchise, the 47th in the National League and the seventh at Wrigley Field (then known as "Cubs Park"). The Cubs finished fifth in the National League with a record of 80–74.

On August 25 at Cubs Park, the Cubs and Philadelphia Phillies combined for 49 runs and 51 hits in a 26-23 Cubs victory, a modern-day record for total runs and hits in a major league game. The Cubs scored 10 runs in the second inning and 14 runs in the fourth inning providing the Cubs enough runs to win.

== Regular season ==
=== Season standings ===
National League
Team	W	L	Pct.	GB	Home	Road
New York Giants	93	61	.604	—	51‍–‍27	42‍–‍34
Cincinnati Reds	86	68	.558	7	48‍–‍29	38‍–‍39
St. Louis Cardinals	85	69	.552	8	42‍–‍35	43‍–‍34
Pittsburgh Pirates	85	69	.552	8	45‍–‍33	40‍–‍36
Chicago Cubs	80	74	.519	13	39‍–‍37	41‍–‍37
Brooklyn Robins	76	78	.494	17	44‍–‍34	32‍–‍44
Philadelphia Phillies	57	96	.373	35½	35‍–‍41	22‍–‍55
Boston Braves	53	100	.346	39½	32‍–‍43	21‍–‍57

=== Record vs. opponents ===
1922 National League record Sources:
Team	BSN	BRO	CHC	CIN	NYG	PHI	PIT	STL
Boston	—	7–15	4–18	5–17	8–14–1	8–13	10–12	11–11
Brooklyn	15–7	—	11–11	8–14	8–14–1	15–7	11–11	8–14
Chicago	18–4	11–11	—	11–11–1	8–14	9–13–1	10–12	13–9
Cincinnati	17–5	14–8	11–11–1	—	10–12	15–7	11–11–1	8–14
New York	14–8–1	14–8–1	14–8	12–10	—	15–7	11–11	13–9
Philadelphia	13–8	7–15	13–9–1	7–15	7–15	—	3–19	7–15
Pittsburgh	12–10	11–11	12–10	11–11–1	11–11	19–3	—	9–13
St. Louis	11–11	14–8	9–13	14–8	9–13	15–7	13–9	—

=== Roster ===
1922 Chicago Cubs
Roster
Pitchers: Vic Aldridge; Pete Alexander; Virgil Cheeves; Uel Eubanks; Buck Freeman; Fred Fussell; Percy Jones; Tony Kaufmann; Vic Keen; Speed Martin; Ed Morris; Tiny Osborne; George Stueland	Catchers: Gabby Hartnett; Bob O'Farrell; Kettle Wirts; Infielders: Sparky Adams; Walt Golvin; George Grantham; Ray Grimes; Charlie Hollocher; John Kelleher; Joe Klugmann; Marty Krug; Zeb Terry	Outfielders: Turner Barber; Marty Callaghan; Howie Fitzgerald; Max Flack; Bernie Friberg; Cliff Heathcote; George Maisel; Hack Miller; Jigger Statz; Other batters: Hooks Cotter; Butch Weis	Manager: Bill Killefer; Coaches: Oscar Dugey

== Player stats ==
=== Batting ===
==== Starters by position ====
Note: Pos = Position; G = Games played; AB = At bats; H = Hits; Avg. = Batting average; HR = Home runs; RBI = Runs batted in

Pos	Player	G	AB	H	Avg.	HR	RBI
C	Bob O'Farrell	128	392	127	.324	4	60
1B	Ray Grimes	138	509	180	.354	14	99
2B	Zeb Terry	131	496	142	.286	0	67
SS	Charlie Hollocher	152	592	201	.340	3	69
3B	Marty Krug	127	450	124	.276	4	60
OF	Bernie Friberg	97	296	92	.311	0	23
OF	Jigger Statz	110	462	137	.297	1	34
OF	Hack Miller	122	466	164	.352	12	78

==== Other batters ====
Note: G = Games played; AB = At bats; H = Hits; Avg. = Batting average; HR = Home runs; RBI = Runs batted in

Player	G	AB	H	Avg.	HR	RBI
Cliff Heathcote	76	243	68	.280	1	34
Turner Barber	84	226	70	.310	0	29
John Kelleher	63	193	50	.259	0	20
Marty Callaghan	74	175	45	.257	0	20
George Maisel	38	84	16	.190	0	6
Gabby Hartnett	31	72	14	.194	0	4
Kettle Wirts	31	58	10	.172	1	6
Max Flack	17	54	12	.222	0	6
Sparky Adams	11	44	11	.250	0	3
Howie Fitzgerald	10	24	8	.333	0	4
George Grantham	7	23	4	.174	0	3
Joe Klugmann	2	2	0	.000	0	0
Walt Golvin	2	2	0	.000	0	1
Butch Weis	2	2	1	.500	0	0
Hooks Cotter	1	1	1	1.000	0	0

=== Pitching ===
==== Starting pitchers ====
Note: G = Games pitched; IP = Innings pitched; W = Wins; L = Losses; ERA = Earned run average; SO = Strikeouts

Player	G	IP	W	L	ERA	SO
Vic Aldridge	36	258.1	16	15	3.52	66
Pete Alexander	33	245.2	16	13	3.63	48
Fred Fussell	3	19.0	1	1	4.74	4
Speed Martin	1	6.0	1	0	7.50	2

==== Other pitchers ====
Note: G = Games pitched; IP = Innings pitched; W = Wins; L = Losses; ERA = Earned run average; SO = Strikeouts

Player	G	IP	W	L	ERA	SO
Tiny Osborne	41	184.0	9	5	4.50	81
Virgil Cheeves	39	182.2	12	11	4.09	40
Percy Jones	44	162.0	8	9	4.78	45
Tony Kaufmann	37	153.0	7	13	4.06	45
George Stueland	35	113.0	9	4	5.81	44
Vic Keen	7	34.2	1	2	3.89	11

==== Relief pitchers ====
Note: G = Games pitched; W = Wins; L = Losses; SV = Saves; ERA = Earned run average; SO = Strikeouts

Player	G	W	L	SV	ERA	SO
Buck Freeman	11	0	1	1	8.77	10
Ed Morris	5	0	0	0	8.25	5
Uel Eubanks	2	0	0	0	27.00	1

== Farm system ==
- Class AA: Los Angeles Angels (Pacific Coast League; Red Killefer, manager)
