= Nebraska Legislature 42nd district =

American legislative district

Nebraska's 42nd legislative district
- Map of Nebraska Legislature districts with the 42nd district shaded in red
Senator
Mike Jacobson; R–North Platte
since 2022
- Demographics: 89% White; 1.1% Black; 8.1% Hispanic; 0.8% Asian; 0.6% Native American
- Population (2020): 38,324

The Nebraska Legislature's 42nd district is one of the 49 legislative districts in the Nebraska Legislature. The district is located in west-central Nebraska and covers all of Hooker, Lincoln, Logan, McPherson, Thomas, and most of Perkins counties. Notable settlements in the area include North Platte, Madrid, Gandy, Mullen, and Sutherland. Mike Jacobson has represented the district since 2022.

== Demographics ==
The US Census Bureau recorded the population as of 2020 at 38,324.

- 89% of the district is White.
- 8.1% of the district is Hispanic.
- 1.1% of the district is Black.
- 0.8% of the district is Asian.
- 0.6% of the district is Native American.

== List of representatives ==
Representative	Party	Years of service	Legislature	Hometown
Mike Jacobson	Republican	2022 - present	107th-109th	North Platte
Mike Groene	Republican	2015-2022*	104th-107th	North Platte
Tom Hansen	Republican	2007-2015	100th-104th	North Platte

- Mike Groene resigned before his term ended. Mike Jacobson was appointed to fill the vacancy.
