= Mike Groene =

American politician (born 1955)

Member of the Nebraska Legislature from the 42nd district
- In office January 7, 2015 – February 18, 2022
- Preceded by: Tom Hansen
- Succeeded by: Mike Jacobson

Personal details
- Born: August 10, 1955 (age 70) Nebraska, U.S.
- Party: Republican
- Education: University of Nebraska–Lincoln (BS)

Michael K. Groene (/ˈɡroʊni/ GROH-nee; born August 10, 1955) is a politician from the state of Nebraska in the Midwestern United States. In 2014, he was elected to the Nebraska Legislature, representing a district in the southwestern part of the state, including the city of North Platte. Groene is a member of the Republican Party. He resigned in 2022 after admitting to taking sexually inappropriate photographs of a legislative aide.

== Early life and education ==
Groene was born August 20, 1955, and raised on a farm near Olean in northeastern Nebraska. He graduated from high school in Dodge in 1973. He attended the University of Nebraska–Lincoln, graduating in 1977 with a Bachelor of Science degree in agricultural economics.

== Career ==
Groene began working for Brothers Equipment Company, a dealer in new and used agricultural implements based in Friend, Nebraska. In the course of this job, he moved to Holyoke, Colorado in 1990. In 1997, he returned to Nebraska, settling in the city of North Platte.

In April 2018, he became widely known for his insulting emails towards persons out of his district.

In Holyoke, Groene involved himself in Republican Party politics. In 1995, he ran for the local school board.

According to Groene, he paid little attention to taxes in Colorado. However, when he moved back to Nebraska in 1997, he said, he was struck by how much higher the taxes were. In particular, he described his house in Nebraska as comparable to the one he had occupied in Colorado, but with a property tax bill twice as high.

In North Platte, Groene co-founded the Western Nebraska Taxpayers Association, which he described as a nonpartisan group with no agenda apart from lowering taxes. In 2006, the group staged a petition drive to amend the Nebraska constitution; the proposed amendment would have limited the growth of state government spending to the rate of inflation and population growth. Enough signatures were secured to place the measure on the ballot; it was opposed by groups including the American Association of Retired Persons (AARP), the National Education Association (NEA), the Nebraska Farm Bureau, the League of Nebraska Municipalities, the Nebraska and the Greater Omaha Chambers of Commerce, and the Associated General Contractors. By November 1, shortly before the election, the pro-limit campaign had raised about $1.7 million, most of it from two out-of-state organizations, Americans for Limited Government and the National Taxpayers Union; the opposition had raised $2.4 million, about half of which came from the AARP and the NEA. The measure failed by a margin of 30–70%.

In 2006, Groene also ran for a seat on the board of governors of Mid-Plains Community College. In the general election, he was defeated by a margin of 45–55%.

In the course of the 2006 campaigns, Groene met Pete Ricketts, who was then making an unsuccessful attempt to win one of Nebraska's U.S. Senate seats from incumbent Ben Nelson. Discussions between Groene and Ricketts led to the establishment of the Platte Institute for Economic Research, which described itself as "Nebraska's first Free Market think tank". When the organization was launched in 2007, Ricketts held the title of director and president; Groene was a member of the board.

=== 2014 election ===
In 2014, Groene announced that he would run for a seat in the Nebraska legislature, representing the 42nd District, which was coterminous with Lincoln County. Under Nebraska's term-limits law, the incumbent, Tom Hansen, was ineligible to run for a third consecutive term.

==== 2014 primary ====
Groene faced two other candidates in the nonpartisan primary election. Scott Dulin, a member of the Democratic Party from North Platte, had grown up on a farm near Hershey, then worked for the Union Pacific Railroad for 19 years, then spent four years working as a rail accident investigator for a Minnesota law firm. While at Union Pacific, he had served for ten years as the local union chairman; for four years, he had served as the alternate legislative representative. Roric Paulman, like Groene a Republican, was a farmer from Sutherland. He was president of the non-profit Nebraska Water Balance Alliance, and had served on state task forces dealing with water and agricultural issues. None of the candidates had previously held public office.

All three candidates named taxes as an issue of concern, and expressed support for lowering property taxes. None of the three supported the 2010 Patient Protection and Affordable Care Act (ACA); Dulin supported the proposed expansion of Medicaid in Nebraska under the ACA's provisions, while Groene and Paulman opposed it.

In the primary election, Paulman received 42.3% of the vote; Groene, 37.6%; and Dulin, 20.0%. As the top two vote-getters, Paulman and Groene moved on to the general election.

==== 2014 general election ====
In announcing his candidacy, Groene had stated that he would not accept contributions from "special interest groups", and would only accept "help to run his campaign from individual citizens". Over the course of the entire campaign, he secured $37,000 in contributions and spent $35,000. Major contributors to the campaign included Groene and his family, donating $8800; Providence Investments of North Platte, contributing $3500; and two individuals, one in Blair and one in Columbus, each contributing $2500. The Paulman campaign's total receipts amounted to $162,000; its total expenditures were $167,000. Paulman contributed $34,000 to his campaign, and loaned it another $54,000. Major contributions included $10,000 from the Nebraska Hospital Association, $4750 from the Nebraska Bankers State PAC, $4500 from the Nebraska Realtors, and $3300 from the Nebraska Chamber of Commerce and Industry.

Paulman received endorsements from the Nebraska Farm Bureau and the Nebraska chapter of the AFL–CIO. His campaign website listed endorsements from nine members of the state legislature, including 42nd District incumbent Hansen.

When the general election was held, Groene received 5322 votes, or 51.5% of the total, to Paulman's 5008 votes, or 48.5%. Groene described his victory as unexpected, and attributed it to extensive door-to-door campaigning, and to buying time every week on a local talk-radio show.

=== Legislative tenure ===
==== 2015 session ====
In the 2015 legislative session, Groene was assigned to the Education Committee, the Government, Military and Veterans Affairs Committee, and the Nebraska Retirement Systems Committee.

Groene led two successful filibusters in the 2015 session. LB18 would have required Nebraska students to be vaccinated against meningitis. Supporters of the measure argued that mandatory vaccination was necessary as a public-health measure, and was supported by the general medical community; opponents maintained that the incidence of meningitis in Nebraska was low, and that the danger was not sufficient to justify the incursion on individual freedom. A second filibuster killed LB423, which would have made tax credits available for wind- or solar-energy production. Supporters argued that the bill would spur development of Nebraska's wind-power resources, and would boost the economy of rural areas; Groene and other opponents contended that the unreliability of wind power would preclude using it to replace coal plants, and that the $75 million cost of the tax credits would ultimately be borne by ratepayers and taxpayers.

Among the "most significant" actions taken by the Legislature in its 2015 session were three bills that passed over vetoes by governor Pete Ricketts. LB268 repealed the state's death penalty; LB623 reversed the state's previous policy of denying driver's licenses to people who were living illegally in the United States after being brought to the country as children, and who had been granted exemption from deportation under the Barack Obama administration's Deferred Action for Childhood Arrivals (DACA) program; and LB610 increased the tax on gasoline to pay for repairs to roads and bridges. Groene voted against the death-penalty repeal, and to sustain Ricketts's veto of the measure; he voted against passage of LB623, and to sustain the gubernatorial veto; and he voted against passage of the gas-tax increase, and to sustain the veto.

==== 2016 session ====
In its 2016 session, the Nebraska legislature passed three bills that Ricketts then vetoed. LB580 would have created an independent commission of citizens to draw new district maps following censuses; supporters described it as an attempt to de-politicize the redistricting process, while Ricketts maintained that the bill delegated the legislature's constitutional duty of redistricting to "an unelected and unaccountable board". In the bill's 29–15 passage, Groene voted against it, stating "Politicians are giving more and more authority to un-elected appointed commissions to avoid having to take a stand on issues." Sponsor John Murante opted not to seek an override of the governor's veto.

A second vetoed bill, LB935, would have changed state audit procedures. The bill passed by a margin of 37–8, with 4 present and not voting; Groene was one of those voting against it, on the grounds that an amendment to the bill had made it more difficult for citizens to monitor spending by state employees and elected officials. The bill was withdrawn without an attempt to override the veto; the state auditor agreed to work with the governor on a new version for the next year's session.

A third bill passed over Ricketts's veto. LB947 made DACA beneficiaries eligible for commercial and professional licenses in Nebraska. The bill passed the Legislature on a vote of 33–11–5, with Groene among those voting against it; the veto override passed 31–13–5, with Groene again casting a nay vote. Groene stated that his opposition arose from the belief that illegal immigrants "cheat the system and jump the line", and should not be rewarded for this misconduct.

The legislature failed to pass LB10, greatly desired by the Republican Party, which would have restored Nebraska to a winner-take-all scheme of allocating its electoral votes in U.S. presidential elections, rather than continuing its practice of awarding the electoral vote for each congressional district to the candidate who received the most votes in that district. Supporters were unable to break a filibuster; in the 32–17 cloture motion, Groene was among those who voted in favor of the bill.

=== Resignation ===
Groene resigned his office in February 2022 after being accused of taking sexually inappropriate photographs of a female legislative aide. He also dropped out of a race for a seat on the University of Nebraska Board of Regents. Groene denies that the photographs were sexual in nature.

== Controversy ==
Senator Groene is known for unguarded remarks toward constituents and his colleagues in the Legislature, including insults and vulgar hand gestures. He has described this behavior as a "push against the wall tactic" he considers successful when an opponent has "lost it".

=== Intentionally contracting COVID ===
Groene opposes measures to contain the COVID-19 pandemic and stated that he wanted to become infected with the SARS-CoV-2 virus. He successfully contracted COVID in October 2020. Groene personally insulted his constituents who contacted him in disagreement with his response to the pandemic and his desire to become infected. Groene called constituents "stupid," "fanatic," and "pathetic" because of their opinion that the virus should be controlled. Because constituents were confused about where to complain about Groene's insults, the Lincoln Journal Star printed guidance on the topic.

=== Religion useful to "keep people in line" ===
During a 2019 hearing about a bill mandating the phrase "In God We Trust" be displayed in every classroom in Nebraska, Groene stated that fear of Hell and fear of God are useful to "keep people in line." He felt that atheists should promote religion because, in his view, religion is useful to control people and to make children obedient.

Atheists criticized Groene's statement, including blogger Hemant Mehta who called it a "startling admission" of the way conservative politicians use religion to manipulate people.

=== Horse massage ===
Groene proposed a bill to change the regulations around massage therapy for horses and other equines in 2018. A woman contacted Groene criticizing him for spending time on the horse massage bill, which she considered frivolous, rather than a bill to place social workers in schools. Groene responded crudely to her, saying that "asses" are equines so the woman should seek an equine massage. A "social media firestorm" occurred in response to Groene's words, according to local media.

=== Inappropriate photos ===
A staffer working for Groene discovered photos of herself on Groene's laptop in the course of her work. The staffer said that the invasive photos were emailed with captions of a sexual and demeaning nature. After speaking with governor Pete Ricketts, Groene announced his resignation from the Legislature.

Senator Megan Hunt requested an investigation into the possibility that the incident with the photos represents criminal wrongdoing. Senator Jen Day joined Hunt in her call for an investigation, and remarked that she was unsurprised by the allegations because of "the really deep misogyny that exists in the Nebraska Legislature towards female senators and female staff members."

As of March 2022, police are investigating Groene's state-issued computers based probable cause of official misconduct.

== Personal life ==
Groene married in 1985; he and his wife Barb have two children.
