= Senator Pappas =

Senator Pappas may refer to:

- Chris Pappas (American politician) (born 1980), U.S. Senator-elect from New Hampshire
- James Pappas (born 1944), Nebraska State Senate
- Sandy Pappas (born 1949), Minnesota State Senate
- Stephan Pappas (born 1950), Wyoming State Senate
