= Olean, Nebraska =

Olean, Nebraska is the name of two unincorporated communities:

- Olean, Colfax County, Nebraska
- Olean, Valley County, Nebraska
