= List of killings by law enforcement officers in the United States, 2009 =

This is a list of people reported killed by non-military law enforcement officers in the United States in 2009, whether in the line of duty or not, and regardless of reason or method. The listing documents the occurrence of a death, making no implications regarding wrongdoing or justification on the part of the person killed or officer involved. Killings are arranged by date of the incident that caused death. Different death dates, if known, are noted in the description. The table below lists 252 people.

== 2009 ==
Date	Victim	Race	State (City)	Description
2009‑12‑31	Adam Jay Smith (26)	White	Washington (Bothell)	Shot after refusing to drop a screwdriver that was recently used to stab another man in the face. Police were responding to report of domestic violence.
2009-12-26	John A. "Smokey" Johnson (49)	Black	Florida (St. Petersburg)	
2009-12-26	Allen Bryant (31)	Black	Florida (Fort Lauderdale)	
2009-12-24	Hussein Al-Rekabi (19)		Utah (Salt Lake City)	
2009-12-24	Richard Longstreet (34)	Black	Florida (Riverview)	
2009-12-21	David Edward Crable (35)	White	Washington (Eatonville)	Shot after shooting and injuring deputies. Officers were responding to report of a domestic disturbance. One deputy later died of injuries.
2009-12-20	Tyson Richardson (21)	White	Florida (Cape Coral)	
2009-12-19	John Thuan Chinh Vu (41)	Asian/Pacific Islander	Washington (Lacey)	Shot in the rear torso while attempting to flee a house surrounded by Thurston County deputies. The deputies were attempting to effect a warrant for Mr. Vu's arrest on second-degree murder charges.
2009-12-19	Emil Jose Estrada (40)	Asian/Pacific Islander	Washington (Des Moines)	Shot after pointing a gun at police. Police were approaching him as prime suspect in a recent report of domestic violence involving a gun.
2009-12-18	Darrin Hogg (22)	Black	California (Bakersfield)	Shot by Bakersfield police officers who were responding to a report of a fight. They did not find the fight but heard gunshots and continued to investigate. One officer saw Hogg walking and asked to speak with him. Hogg walked away but as the officer approached, Hogg fired at him. Two more officers arrived at the scene and the shootout continued. Hogg was shot. He died at a local hospital.
2009-12-17	Hitesh "Sam" Patel (44)	Race unspecified	Georgia (Stockbridge)	
2009-12-17	Jose Molina (76)	Hispanic/Latino	Texas (Edinburg)	
2009-12-17	Emmanuel Alvarez (27)	Hispanic/Latino	California (West Covina)	
2009-12-17	John Calhoun Ward IV (38)	White	Texas (Dumas)	John Calhoun Ward was attempting to murder his girlfriend on the night of December 17, 2009. When police arrived, he had her at gunpoint and was shot by Dumas police.
2009-12-14	Linda Hicks (62)		Ohio (Toledo)	
2009-12-14	Neil Southerland (30)		Florida (Jacksonville)	
2009-12-13	Nicholas Alvarado Morales		Colorado (Denver)	Officer responding to "shots fired" call, spotted Morales with the spotlight on his patrol car. Morales turned and pointed his gun at the officer. The officer fired five shots, fatally wounding Morales.
2009-12-13	Andreas Mumm		Florida (Miami)	
2009-12-10	Raymond Martinez (25)		New York (Manhattan)	
2009-12-07	Brandon Michael Reuter		California (Redding)	Shot after threatening police with gun, that turned out to be a BB gun that looked like a 9mm handgun. When shot, a police dog had a hold on Reuter. He was being pursued for having stolen $3000 from a bank at gunpoint.
2009-12-02	Justin Taylor Morehead		Arkansas (Fort Smith)	Officer responded to a call from a city transit driver claiming an intoxicated Morehead to be carrying a hand grenade and a gun on board. The bus driver then faked a mechanical break down to allow time for police to arrive. Once police arrived, Morehead then exited the bus and surrendered his gun only to draw a second gun and point it at the officer who then fired 3 shots at Morehead striking him twice in the upper torso. The guns were later discovered to be BB guns, 1 replicating a Desert Eagle 45, and the grenade was found to be a BB ammo can. Morehead was later pronounced dead at a local hospital.
2009-12-01	Maurice Clemmons		Washington (Seattle)	Shot after refusing commands to stop and after reaching into waist area. Clemmons was the prime suspect in a recent killing of four police officers in Lakewood, Washington two days earlier.
2009-11-25	Perez Jackson (36)		Florida (Orlando)	
2009-11-23	Alan Provencal (69)		Florida (North Port)	
2009-12-19	James Collins (46)		Florida (Lake Worth)	
2009-11-17	Michael C Nestor		Georgia (Augusta)	Shot while backing vehicle towards officers. Nestor was wanted on a drugs possession warrant. Police approached Nestor at his home while loading possessions into his vehicle in an apparent attempt to flee.
2009-11-15	Kevin White (43)		New York (Brooklyn)	
2009-11-14	Bradley Gastin		Georgia (Macon)	Shot after attempting to run over police in a stolen vehicle. Officers were pursuing the vehicle after a report of a recent carjacking.
2009-11-14	Corey McNeal (38)		Florida (Miami)	
2009-11-12	Terry Ramsey		Georgia (Richmond County)	Shot after refusing to put down the knife Ramsey was holding to the throat of his estranged wife. Police were responding to a report of a domestic disturbance.
2009-11-12	Daniel Carlon (23)		California (Los Angeles)	
2009-11-06	Chad Pierce		Georgia (Arlington)	Shot while reaching towards glove box. Pierce had led officers on a high speed, 20 mile chase that ended with Pierce crashing his vehicle into a ditch. No weapon was found in the vehicle.
2009-11-05	Dalton Rahman (18)	White	California (Los Angeles)	
2009-11-03	Landris Hawkins (28)		Arkansas (Little Rock)	Shot to death by police after making "a threatening move." Hawkins had allegedly used a kitchen knife to cut himself and his grandmother, who officers say he would not let out of the house when they arrived. The man had a history of mental illness, according to police and family members.
2009-11-03	Julian Nolasco (25)	Latino	California (Los Angeles)	
2009-11-03	Juan Aguiar (29)	Latino	California (Los Angeles)	
2009-11-01	John LaBossiere		Washington (Lake Stevens)	Shot during confrontation with police. Officer was responding to report of armed man forcing entry into home where LaBossiere's estranged wife was staying.
2009-12-02	Drana Nikac (67)		New York (Bronx)	
2009-10-28	Luqman Ameen Abdullah (aka Christopher Thomas)		Michigan (Dearborn)	Shot 21 times during FBI raid on Dearborn warehouse.
2009-10-28	John Cooper		California (Fresno)	Cooper called 911 and said he would kill "the first cop I see." He called again indicating thoughts of suicide. When Fresno Police officers arrived Cooper was pointing what appeared to be a gun at his head. When he pointed the gun at officers they shot and killed him. It turned out to be a toy gun.
2009-10-28	Kentin Brooks (26)		Florida (Indian Shores)	
2009-10-27	Steven Anthony Vargas (32)		California (Fresno)	When Vargas crashed his SUV into a parked minivan a neighbor flagged down a Fresno Police officer. Fresno Police Chief Jerry Dyer reported that witnesses told the office the driver had a weapon and appeared to be on PCP. The office approached the vehicle and, feeling Vargas was reaching for a weapon, fired his pistol several times, killing Vargas. No gun was found. In December 2011, the City of Fresno was ordered to pay a $1.3 million settlement in an excessive-force case based on the shooting.
2009-10-24	Jerry Camp (43)		Florida (Winter Park)	
2009-10-23	Sara Riggins		Georgia (Albany)	Shot as officers responded to a domestic disturbance.
2009-10-19	unnamed male		Georgia (Austell)	Shot while attempting to run over deputies with vehicle. Police were responding to report of a suspicious person climbing a fence. When the deputies approached the man in his car and ordered him to get out, he drove towards one of the deputies.
2009-10-18	Bastiany Georges (29)		Florida (Fort Lauderdale)	
2009-10-17	Charles Ross (51)		Florida (Middleburg)	
2009-10-17	John Fulchiero (50)	White	California (Los Angeles)	
2009-10-11	Bentley, Dartanya Jr		Georgia (Rincon)	Died from injuries in motor vehicle accident after fleeing vehicle ran over spike strips placed on road by deputy. Bentley was originally stopped for speeding, but fled in vehicle when asked for his driver's license. A high speed chase ensued. After running over the spikes Bentley and his passenger died in the accident that also injured a person in a different vehicle.
2009-10-11	unnamed person		Georgia (Rincon)	Died from injuries in motor vehicle accident after fleeing vehicle ran over spike strips placed on road by deputy. Bentley was originally stopped for speeding, but fled in vehicle when asked for his driver's license. A high speed chase ensued. After running over the spikes Bentley and his passenger died in the accident that also injured a person in a different vehicle.
2009-10-11	Erik Von Davis		Georgia (Stockbridge)	Shot after striking officer in the neck with a hammer. Police were responding to the sounds of shouting. Davis was in the doorway of a home "yelling all sorts of crazy things".
2009-10-09	Frank Hernandez		New York (New York)	Hernandez abducted a woman in Long Island and drove her to a supermarket before sexually assaulting her. Officers responding to a 911 call tried to pull Hernandez out of the car, at which point he grabbed a pellet gun and was shot in the stomach and wrist.
2009-10-07	Unnamed man (21)		New York (Manhattan)	
2009-10-02	Jamil Murray (28)		Florida (West Palm Beach)	
2009-10-02	Dana Dempsey		Minnesota (Elk River)	Shot in front of court house, where he was to appear for a controlled substance charge he had pleaded guilty to. Officers state he drew and fired a revolver before he was shot by Capt. Dan Andren and court security deputy Nicole Stottlemyre.
2009-10-02	Efrain Gutierrez (31)	Latino	California (Los Angeles)	
2009-09-29	Michael Scott Lee (21)		Florida (Pensacola)	
2009-09-28	Joe Prevatt (44)		Florida (Starke)	
2009-09-27	Vionique Valnord (32)		New York (Brooklyn)	Struck and killed by a drunk NYPD officer Andrew Kelly.
2009-09-24	Robert Johnson (44)		Florida (Jacksonville)	
2009-09-23	Lonnie Graham (28)		California (Fresno)	Graham, a wanted parolee, was shot by Fresno Police early Wednesday morning. Friends say he was trying to surrender to police. Police called him out of the house and shot him when he did not drop a shiny object in his hand. A cell phone was found near his body.
2009-09-20	Christopher Reynoso (31)		Florida (Jacksonville)	
2009-09-20	Leopoldo Huiza (24)	Latino	California (Los Angeles)	
2009-09-20	Felipe Valdovinos (27)	Latino	California (Los Angeles)	
2009-09-19	Katherine Hysaw		Arizona (Phoenix)	Officers were responding to calls of Hysaw threatening her neighbors with a knife. When they entered her apartment, Hysaw started throwing bottles at them. Officers attempted to use a taser, but missed. Hysaw then attacked one of the officers with a butcher's knife. After 2 rubber bullets failed to stop her, one of the officers fired 2 rounds from his rifle. Hysaw died at the scene.
2009-09-19	Travion Richard (17)	Black	California (Los Angeles)	
2009-09-15	Christopher Villareal		Washington (Richland)	Shot after attempting to ram a police officer on a motorcycle with his car. Police were pursuing Villareal for erratic driving. In March 2013, a federal judge determined that a wrongful death lawsuit against the officer could proceed to trial.
2009-09-15	Samuel White (20)		New York (Brooklyn)	
2009-09-14	Darrick Collins (36)	Black	California (Los Angeles)	
2009-09-10	Jason Williams (32)		Washington (Seattle)	Shot after pulling out a toy/replica gun. Deputies confronted two men as prime suspects in recent robbery of a credit union. The second man was Tasered and arrested.
2009-09-10	unnamed man		Georgia (St. Simons Island)	Shot after threatening to kill police with high-powered rifle. SWAT team had responded to report that the man had barricaded himself in his house with a gun after code enforcement officers informed him he had too many signs in front of his house.
2009-09-06	Robert Brown (84)	Black	California (Los Angeles)	
2009-09-04	unnamed man		Washington (Federal Way)	Shot after threatening to kill officers during confrontation with police. Officers contacted the man while searching for a suspect in a bank robbery earlier in the day.
2009-09-04	Mark Anthony Daniels (31)		Florida (Marianna)	
2009-09-04	Wilson Victorian (59)	Black	California (Los Angeles)	
2009-09-02	Jonathan Ayers		Georgia (Toccoa)	Shot after reversing vehicle into an officer. Undercover police had approached Ayers as part of an investigation into drugs and prostitution.
2009-08-27	Adrein Herrera (30)		Florida (Miami Gardens)	
2009-08-22	Antonio Kendrick (21)		Florida (Jacksonville)	
2009-08-19	Anthony Arias (26)		Florida (Hialeah)	
2009-08-15	Joseph Leonard Burkett		Washington (Olympia)	Shot after pulling out gun and not allowing police to take it from him. Burkett was in the emergency room of a hospital being treated for a head injury. Police were called in when Burkett became agitated. The officers confiscated two guns from Burkett and remained while he was treated.
2009-08-10	Brian Christopher Naranjo		Colorado (Longmont)	Shot after pointing handgun at officers. Police had stopped Naranjo on a routine traffic stop when it was discovered Naranjo had an outstanding arrest warrant and fled in his vehicle. A high speed chase ended with a police car ramming Naranjo's vehicle.
2009-08-09	Douglas, Oran (37)	Black	California (Los Angeles)	
2009-08-07	Ezequiel Jacobo (33)	Latino	California (Los Angeles)	
2009-08-07	Guillermo Saucedo (23)	Latino	California (Los Angeles)	
2009-08-06	Jesse Long (19)	Black	California (Los Angeles)	
2009-08-06	Shawn Larson		Washington (Lake Stevens)	Shot after fighting with deputy at truck scales. Larson had been pulled over for driving erratically.
2009-08-05	Michael Andrew Campbell		Florida (Palatka)	
2009-08-03	Jeff Weekley (39)		Florida (Freeport)	
2009-08-03	Alex May (18)		Florida (Maitland)	
2009-08-01	Howard Gross (57)	White	California (Los Angeles)	
2009-08-01	Oswaldo Sevilla (31)		New York (Bronx)	
2009-07-24	Jose Jimenez (16)	White	California (Los Angeles)	
2009-07-23	Unnamed man		New York (Manhattan)	
2009-07-21	Martina Brown (58)		New Jersey (Jersey City)	
2009-07-21	Penny Schwartz		Georgia (Duluth)	Shot after Schwartz confronted officer with a handgun. A single officer responded to a Baker's report of a suicidal person. Baker was shot by accident.
2009-07-21	Barbara Baker		Georgia (Duluth)	Shot after Schwartz confronted officer with a handgun. A single officer responded to a Baker's report of a suicidal person. Baker was shot by accident.
2009-07-16	Hassan Skakur (32)		New Jersey (Jersey City)	
2009-07-16	Amanda Anderson (22)		New Jersey (Jersey City)	
2009-07-14	Jesus Serna (32)		California (Fresno)	Fresno County Sheriff's SWAT team officers responded to reports of a man with a gun at a tire shop on South Elm Ave near West North Ave. just south of Fresno City limits. Serna, armed with a rifle, fired on the arriving Deputies before they got out of their cars, wounding them with glass fragments. Serna then hid in a nearby industrial area. Deputies found him and called for him to come out. Serna refused and was shot and killed by deputies.
2009-07-13	Kiana Lamb		Florida (Miami)	
2009-07-11	Shem Walker (49)		New York (Brooklyn)	
2009-07-10	Jason Poss		Washington (Spokane)	Shot after refusing orders to drop knife and threatening officers with the knife. Police approached Poss as the primary suspect in two recent reports of assault and home breakins.
2009-07-10	Woodrow Player, Jr. (22)	Black	California (Athens)	LASD sheriff deputies initiated a traffic stop on Player after receiving a 911 call by a woman who said that a man fitting his description threatened her and her child with a gun. When the deputies pulled up behind his car, Player got out of the car and started running into an alley. He was then shot multiple times by the deputies A spokesman for the Sheriff's Department claimed that Player reached into his waistband and turned towards the deputies. Other witnesses, however, stated that he was unarmed, and was shot while running.
2009-07-10	Tiraneka Jenkins (26)		South Carolina (Charleston)	
2009-07-07	John Pebles		Washington (Bellevue)	Shot after attacking officer with a knife. Police were responding to a report of domestic disturbance.
2009-07-06	Pedro Fernandez (24)	Latino	California (Sawtelle)	
2009-07-06	Patrick Tracy Burris		North Carolina	
2009-07-06	Celso Marrero (51)		Florida (Miami)	
2009-07-05	Avery Cody (16)	Black	California (Compton)	
2009-07-04	James L. Slater, Jr		Washington (Woodinville)	Shot while holding knife. Deputies were investigating report of domestic disturbance.
2009-07-02	Hector Esparza		Colorado (Denver)	Police were responding to a family disturbance, in which Esparza has attacked his step-father. Esparza was in a bedroom, and claiming to be armed with a gun. Esparza suddenly exited the bedroom and raised a gun towards two officers. Officers immediately fired and killed Esparza.
2009-07-02	Dwight Monnie		Washington (Arlington)	Shot by deputy responding to a domestic violence call.
2009-07-01	Sedrick Bernard Cox (40)		Alabama (Gadsden)	
2009-06-27	Robbin Gastineau		Nebraska (Hershey)	Shot during a Domestic Disturbance in which female called 911. The man approached Deputy with a sword and refused to drop weapon.
2009-06-27	Quang Due Do		Florida (Miami)	
2009-06-24	unnamed man		Georgia (Fort Oglethorpe)	Shot after shooting a police officer in bullet-proof vest. The man was resisting arrest in a restaurant parking lot.
2009-06-20	Richard Blount (56)		Florida (Miami)	
2009-06-18	Lawrence McCoy Jr.		Florida (Miami Beach)	McCoy stole a taxi after pistol-whipping the driver and engaged in a vehicle pursuit with police officers. He later crashed into an oncoming car. After getting out of the taxi, he ran and started a foot pursuit. The officers initially claimed that McCoy engaged in a "blazing gun battle." McCoy was shot 9 to 11 times. However, the police issued a new statement, revealing the find of a pistol that they believed belonged to McCoy.
2009-06-17	Kenneth Ayton		Florida (Orlando)	
2009-06-15	Kiko Battle (24)		Florida (Jacksonville)	
2009-06-14	Husien Shehada		Florida (Miami Beach)	Shehada was shot by police after he stopped and put his hands in the air. Before, his brother Samer got into a fight with several men. When the police responded, they claimed that received reports that one of the brothers was hiding an AK-47 under his T-shirt. No 911 calls mentioned a gun being involved. A video recorded by a grocery store CCTV camera showed that Husein Shehada was actually carrying a coat hangar.
2009-06-14	Manny Morales (44)		Florida (Port St. Lucie)	
2009-06-10	Niles Meservey (51)		Washington (Everett)	Niles Meservey was killed after being shot eight times by Officer Troy Meade while sitting in his car outside a hotel, intoxicated and driving through a chain link fence. According to Meade, the car was coming back toward him when he unholstered his gun and began firing at Meservey. In October 2009, Meade was charged with second-degree murder and first-degree manslaughter. In July 2010, Meade was found not guilty of the charges. Meservey's family filed a $15 million civil lawsuit against Meade and the city of Everett.
2009-06-10	Eugene Paul Velarde		Colorado (Denver)	Velarde was shot when he pointed a pistol at a pursuing officer during a foot chase. Velarde had earlier led the officer in a car chase ending when Velarde struck the unmarked police vehicle.
2009-06-08	David LeRoy Wiggs		Colorado (Pueblo)	Shot while holding handgun. Police were approaching Wiggs related to arrest warrants for felony sexual assault.
2009-06-05	Richard Cabrales (20)		California (Los Angeles)	
2009-06-04	Yvette Williams (15)		South Carolina (Rock Hill)	Willis was shot by two cops, after a caller said she was armed with a 9mm handgun. The gun turned out to be a BB gun.
2009-06-02	Dominic Davis (29)		Florida (Jacksonville)	
2009-05-31	Roberto Padilla (33)		California (Fresno)	Padilla was being followed by Fresno Police as a suspect in a string of armed store robberies. When he left a grocery store police followed him down an alley and confronted him. He pulled a weapon and did not drop it as ordered. The five police officers fired 16 times, killing Padilla. It was later confirmed he had just robbed the store.
2009-05-30	Darrell B. Bass		Washington (Covington)	Shot after aiming a rifle at a sheriff's helicopter during standoff. Police were responding to report of Bass's threat to ignite a 250-pound fertilizer bomb in his residence. No explosives were found in the home.
2009-05-29	Daniel Wasilchen		Washington (Granite Falls)	Shot by deputies after getting into an argument with a state noxious-weed expert inspecting Wasilchen's property.
2009-05-28	Brenda Williams (52)		Pennsylvania (Scranton)	Shot after she allegedly lunged at officers with a knife.
2009-05-28	Jackie Beasley (50)		Florida (St. Augustine)	
2009-05-28	Mitchell Matthew Robert Marien (23)	White	California (Bellflower)	
2009-05-27	Wilford Hunton (18)	Black	California (Long Beach)	
2009-05-24	Howard Blair Kepler		Colorado (Broomfield)	Shot after killing wife and during shootout with police. Police were responding to report of domestic disturbance.
2009-05-24	Socrates Siqueiros (21)	Latino	California (Long Beach)	
2009-05-18	Randall Vernon Ellenwood		Idaho (Nezperce)	Shot by Idaho state trooper after overpowering the trooper along with a passenger, Daniel Ricardo Rodriguez, during a traffic stop.
2009-05-17	Marcus Smith (31)	Black	California (Inglewood)	
2009-05-15	Nicholous Weeks (18)		Florida (Gainesville)	
2009-05-15	Gleen Gomez (21)		Florida (Royal Palm Beach)	
2009-05-14	Edmond Albert Sutton (27)		Florida (Winter Haven)	
2009-05-06	Curtis Wetzel (37)		Washington (Lakewood)	Shot by one of five officers responding to reports of a drunken man assaulting his wife. Police claim Mr. Wetzel refused orders to drop a knife and approached to within 17 feet of the officers.
2009-05-06	Vales Delices (23)		Florida (Orlando)	
2009-05-03	James Tuggle (29)	Black	California (Long Beach)	
2009-04-30	Luis Gutierrez (26)		California (Woodland)	Gutierrez was walking on an overpass when he was stopped by three plainclothes deputies from an anti-gang task force. He fled and allegedly pulled a knife on a deputy who caught up with him. Two of the deputies fired on him, killing him.
2009-04-27	unnamed man		Georgia (Decatur)	Shot after attempting to assault officer with a knife. Police were responding to screams inside an apartment.
2009-04-27	Alfredo Montalvo (29)	Latino	California (Lynwood)	
2009-04-27	Kenneth Woodham (57)		Washington (Parkland)	Shot by Pierce County deputy responding to 911 call by Mr. Woodham's wife reporting him having been drinking and screaming at her and her mother.
2009-04-27	Raul Daniel Castillo Razo (15)	Latino	California (Norwalk)	
2009-04-26	William Odell Wood (37)		Alabama (Barnwell)	
2009-04-26	Gene Valdez (18)	Latino	California (Compton)	
2009-04-21	Donnell Miller (22)		Florida (Fort Lauderdale)	
2009-04-18	Rodney Joseph Lasseigne (52)		Florida (St. Augustine)	
2009-04-17	Jairo Bastos		Georgia (Roswell)	Shot after attempting to run over a police officer. Police were responding to a report of abduction of two children who were in the vehicle.
2009-04-16	Aniya Alexander (2)		Illinois (Peoria)	Hit and killed by a jail van driven by officer Jim Krider.
2009-04-16	Erik Garcia (18)	White	California (Los Angeles)	
2009-04-12	Mauricio Jacques (35)		New York (Bronx)	
2009-04-10	Susie Kim		California (Santa Ana)	Shot after a pursuit. Police were pursuing Kim for a traffic violation; Kim was found under the influence of alcohol and cocaine with her 18-month-old daughter in the car.
2009-04-08	Ginette Denize (48)		New York (Brooklyn)	
2009-04-08	Mauricio Cruz (35)		Florida (Palm Springs)	
2009-03-29	Stephanie Montague (20)		North Carolina (Charlotte)	Hit and killed when Martray Proctor collided with her vehicle.
2009-03-29	Shatona Robinson (40)		Tennessee (Memphis)	Hit and killed by Mark Weatherly when his squad car crashed in to her vehicle. Her 17-year-old passenger was also injured.
2009-03-28	Stephen Willis (23)		California (Fresno)	Fresno Police shot 35 times and killed Willis who they say pulled a gun on them as they approached his car in the parking lot of an apartment complex.
2009-03-24	Barbara Stewart (47)		Maine (Biddeford)	Shot after pointing what appeared to be a handgun at police. The gun was later found to be a pellet gun. Police were responding to Stewart's call to police threatening suicide or murder and stating that she was armed.
2009-03-23	Dominic Giacobbe (26)		Florida (Crystal River)	
2009-03-21	Lovelle Mixon		California (Oakland)	2009 shootings of Oakland police officers
2009-03-20	Cesar Maldonado (22)		Florida (Lake Worth)	
2009-03-17	Johnnie L Longest		Washington (Spokane)	Shot after shooting police dog. Police were tracking suspect on foot with police dog after man's vehicle crashed during police chase. Officers were attempting to pull over man for reckless driving.
2009-03-16	Nicholas Burdett (24)		Florida (Miami Beach)	
2009-03-15	Ernesto Castaneda (22)	Latino	California (Rosemead)	
2009-03-15	Unnamed man (18)		New York (Bronx)	
2009-03-12	Loren Ryan (20)		Missouri (St. Charles)	
2009-03-12	Sammie Richardson (59)	Black	California (Los Angeles)	
2009-03-11	Cesar Ramirez (25)	Latino	California (University Park)	
2009-03-09	Victor Becerril (32)		California (Fresno)	Shot by Fresno Police when he held a large wooden object in a threatening manner. He had fled a 2 AM traffic stop. After stun gun was ineffective the officer shot Becerril five times, killing him.
2009-03-09	Javery Holliday (18)		Florida (West Palm Beach)	Holliday and his cousin, Derrick Mortin, were robbing a convenience store with a BB gun when police shot Holliday in the head.
2009-03-09	Carlos Javier Perez-Alonso (32)		Florida (Indian River)	During a car chase, Perez-Alonso jumped out of his SUV with a knife and shot a BB gun at Trooper Michael Coulter, who fatally shot him.
2009-03-08	Catherine D'Onofrio (28)		New York (Greenpoint)	
2009-03-06	Victoria Fox (53)	White	California (Shadow Hills)	
2009-03-03	Dallas Adkins Jr.		Florida (Delray Beach)	Adkins, a Vietman veteran who was acting suicidal, opened his door with a gun and police shot him four times.
2009-03-02	Elizabeth Cardarelli (52)		Florida (Clearwater)	
2009-03-02	Anthony Levy (30)		Florida (Miami Gardens)	
2009-02-27	Santiago Flores (37)		Missouri (St. Louis)	
2009-02-26	Davlon Royall Reagor		Colorado (Denver)	Shot while attempting to run over officer after a car chase.
2009-02-25	Michael Davis (31)		Florida (Miami)	
2009-02-22	William Olbert (53)		Michigan (Zeeland Township)	
2009-02-21	Marcus Lemons (31)	Black	California (Compton)	
2009-02-20	Luther Hudson (38)		Florida (Holiday)	
2009-02-19	Leroy Barnes (38)	Black	California (Pasadena)	
2009-02-15	George Vincent (49)		Florida (Fort Myers)	
2009-02-13	Harold Bobbitt (23)		Missouri (St. Louis)	
2009-02-12	Guy Petrey (27)		Florida (Bonita Springs)	
2009-02-10	Akeem Harvey (18)		New York (Brooklyn)	
2009-02-10	Julie Goodson (42)		Florida (St. Petersburg)	
2009-02-09	Michael Felder (24)		Florida (Jacksonville)	
2009-02-08	Eric Walters (46)	Unknown	California (Vallejo)	
2009-02-07	Philip Munoz		Colorado (Florence)	Died of apparent heart failure. Munoz had fled from police in a stolen garbage truck. Once stopped a Taser was used on him multiple times. Coroner reported "massive" amounts of cocaine in Munoz's system.
2009-02-07	Steven Hernandez (23)	Latino	California (Huntington Park)	
2009-02-05	Theo Bennet		Florida (Jacksonville)	First of two men killed by Jacksonville police that day. Tried to hold up two undercover officers in car posing as drug dealers. Fired in car, narrowly missed officer, both returned fire, Bennet was pronounced dead at the scene.
2009-02-05	Rachel Etheridge (25)		Florida (Jacksonville)	She carjacked another person, then led police on a high-speed chase, ending with police shooting her. She was taken to the hospital with serious injuries, and did not recover.
2009-02-04	Unnamed man (23)	Black	Minnesota (Minneapolis)	
2009-02-04	Junior Carrales (25)		Florida (Miami)	
2009-02-03	James Estes (46)		Florida (Starke)	
2009-01-30	Justin Lane Kelley (20)	Race unspecified	Alabama (Guntersville)	
2009-01-29	Roberto Lopez (23)	Race unspecified	California (Fresno)	
2009-01-29	James Robert Wells Jr. (44)	Race unspecified	Alabama (Trussville)	
2009-01-26	Osman Abdullahi (36)	Black	District of Columbia (Washington)	
2009-01-26	Arthur Lee Coleman (33)	Black	Florida (Fort Myers)	
2009-01-25	Brendan J. Singleton (19)	Black	Maryland (Baltimore)	
2009-01-25	Dijon Williams (23)	Black	Florida (West Palm Beach)	
2009-01-24	Zachary Thomas Luning (32)	Race unspecified	California (Fair Oaks)	
2009-01-24	Ricardo Badillo (22)	Hispanic/Latino	California (Compton)	
2009-01-20	Clayton Lewis (39)	Race unspecified	Georgia (Albany)	Shot after retrieving handgun from console of his car. Police had stopped Lewis regarding suspected drug activity. As Lewis began to flee in his vehicle an officer dove into the backseat of the car. The officer shot Lewis when Lewis retrieved the gun.
2009-01-18	Manuel Guifarro (32)	Hispanic/Latino	Florida (Miami)	
2009-01-14	Larry Reed (22)	Black	Maryland (Baltimore)	
2009-01-14	Matthew Brice Ogden (86)	White	Florida (Jacksonville)	
2009-01-14	Joseph Bernerd Hradec (37)	White	Washington (Seattle)	Shot after spraying officers with a chemical irritant and threatening officers with a knife. Police were responding to a 911 call for help at a motel.
2009-01-12	Arnold Dan Jr. (25)	Native American	New Mexico (Shiprock)	
2009-01-12	Vincent James Lumia III (33)	White	Virginia (Floyd County)	
2009-01-12	Robert E. Wood III (42)	Race unspecified	Massachusetts (Colrain)	
2009-01-12	William Smith (15)	Black	Pennsylvania (Philadelphia)	
2009-01-12	Adalberto Martinez (28)	Hispanic/Latino	Florida (Palm Beach)	
2009-01-12	Elena Cole (46)	Race unspecified	New York (Long Island)	
2009-01-12	Jacob Olson (23)	White	New Jersey (Monmouth Junction)	
2009-01-11	Rodolfo Lepe (31)	Hispanic/Latino	California (Bakersfield)	
2009-01-11	Richard Phillip Robles Jr. (45)	Hispanic/Latino	California (Modesto)	
2009-01-10	Leonard Joseph Velasquez (36)	Race unspecified	California (Rancho Cucamonga)	
2009-01-10	Robert Wesley Holley (40)	Race unspecified	Arkansas (Cabot)	
2009-01-10	Darrel Brown (23)	Black	New York (East Greenbush)	
2009-01-10	Taurean Wilson (26)	Black	Connecticut (East Hartford)	
2009-01-09	Lamar Smith (29)	Black	Pennsylvania (Pittsburgh)	
2009-01-09	Kenji Lee Danzy (30)	Black	Virginia (Norfolk)	
2009-01-08	Barry Martin Koeningsberg (43)	White	California (Anaheim)	
2009-01-08	Carl Brewster (27)	Black	Florida (Plantation)	
2009-01-08	Adam Johnson (24)	White	Oklahoma (Oklahoma City)	
2009-01-08	Takim Skipper (20)	Race unspecified	North Carolina (Charlotte)	
2009-01-08	Derek Jerome Jones (17)	White	Virginia (Martinsville)	
2009-01-07	Stephen T. Thompson (56)	White	Indiana (Fort Wayne)	
2009-01-06	Lorenzo Jones (33)	Race unspecified	Illinois (North Chicago)	
2009-01-05	Robert E. Sylvester (57)	White	Illinois (Normal)	
2009-01-05	Secundino Rivera (59)	Race unspecified	Pennsylvania (Philadelphia)	
2009-01-04	Jose De Jesus Payan Leal (22)	Hispanic/Latino	California (Bakersfield)	Shot by three Bakersfield police officers who say he was armed, suspected of stealing a car, and running away from them.
2009-01-04	McLean, Clifford (24)		Florida (Pembroke Pines)	
2009-01-04	Randolph John Martin (49)	White	California (Woodland)	
2009-01-02	Nathan Hurt (32)	Race unspecified	Kentucky (Scuddy)	
2009-01-01	Gregory Gifford (54)	White	California (Lincoln)	
2009-01-01	Chucky Lee Jackson (29)	Black	Michigan (Grand Rapids)	
2009-01-01	Miles Allen Murphy (22)	White	Washington (Seattle)	Shot after pointing rifle with bayonet at police and refusing commands to drop weapon. Murphy was dressed in World War II -period German uniform and was holding a World War II-era German rifle. Police were responding to reports of gunfire on New Year's Eve which turned out to be blank rounds fired from the rifle.
2009-01-01	Saul Soriano (41)	Hispanic/Latino	California (Arleta)	
2009-01-01	Oscar Grant III (22)	Black	California (Oakland)	Oscar Grant was shot dead by a BART police officer at the Fruitvale BART Station while face down on the station floor. The officer who shot Grant, Johannes Mehserle, was charged with second-degree murder in Grant's death. Mehserle was found not guilty of murder, but was convicted of the lesser charge of involuntary manslaughter. Mehserle was sentenced to two years of prison and served 11 months.
2009-01-01	Adolph Grimes III (22)	Black	Louisiana (New Orleans)	

== See also ==
- Death in custody § United States
- Henry A. Wallace Police Crime Public Database
- List of cases of police brutality
- List of countries with annual rates and counts for killings by law enforcement officers
- List of law enforcement officers killed in the line of duty in the United States
- List of law enforcement officers convicted for an on-duty killing in the United States
- List of shootings by US immigration agents
- List of police reforms related to the George Floyd protests
- List of unarmed African Americans killed by law enforcement officers in the United States
- Lists of killings by law enforcement officers
- Police brutality in the United States
- Police misconduct § United States
- Police riot § United States
- Police use of deadly force in the United States
