= Platte Institute =

American free market advocacy group

Platte Institute for Economic Research
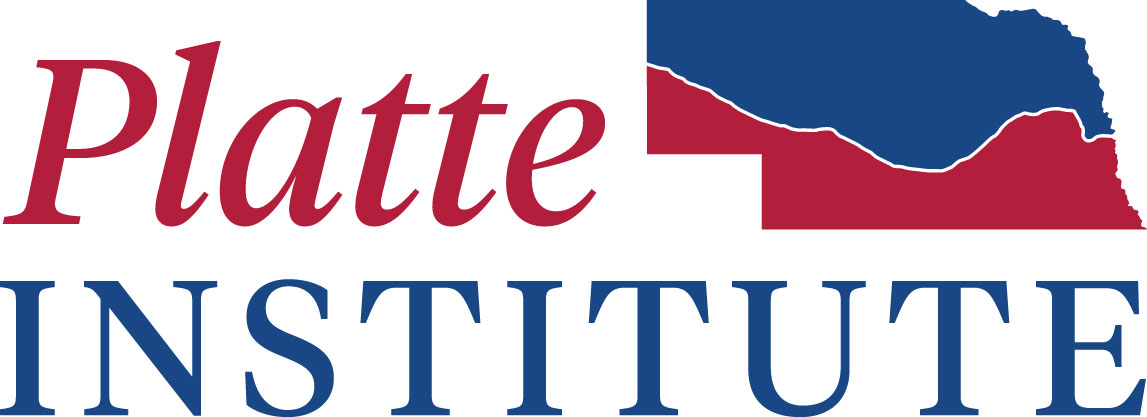
- Founder: Pete Ricketts
- Established: September 2007
- CEO: Jim Vokal
- Budget: Revenue: $1.16 million Expenses: $1.17 million (FYE December 2023)
- Address: 6910 Pacific Street, Suite 216, Omaha, NE 68106
- Coordinates: 41.2500°N 96.0281°W
- Interactive map of Platte Institute for Economic Research
- Website: www.platteinstitute.org

The Platte Institute for Economic Research is a free market advocacy group and think tank headquartered in Omaha, Nebraska. The group is conservative.

== Overview ==
The organization was established in 2007 by Pete Ricketts, who was later elected governor of Nebraska. Ricketts was president of the institute. Ricketts' co-founder was Mike Groene, who became a member of the group's board. As of 2016, its CEO was Jim Vokal.

Several former members of Nebraska's unicameral state legislature have taken jobs with the Platte Institute, including Nicole Fox and Laura Ebke.

The Platte Institute is part of the State Policy Network, a network of conservative think tanks.

== Issues ==
=== Taxes, economy, housing, and land use ===
In 2008, the Platte Institute, along with Ernie Goss of Creighton University, issued a report that concluded that Nebraska, as of 2006, had the eight-highest tax burden among the 50 states. The report's authors argued that Nebraska should cut 1.2% each year from state and local taxes so that the state's tax burden reach the national average by 2016.

The Platte Institute has promoted the reduction of occupational and business licensing requirements in Nebraska, collaborating on these efforts with the ACLU of Nebraska and state Senator Laura Ebke, among others.

The group has advocated for prison reform and reducing Nebraska's incarceration rate. Along with the ACLU and the Council of State Governments Justice Center, the group has promoted the use of enhanced probation, treatment, and community supervision as alternatives to incarceration.

The group has supported deregulation in Nebraska, arguing that many industries and sectors are subjected to excessive state regulation.

Along with the Sierra Club, the American Institute of Architects' Nebraska chapter, and other groups, the Platte Institute joined the "Missing Middle Omaha" housing campaign to support the building of higher-density "missing middle" housing in Nebraska.

In 2011, the organization opposed a bill to change the Nebraska Commission of Industrial Relations, the state body that adjudicates disputes between public-sector workers and employers. The instituted argued that the bill would not substantially reduce government spending, and objected to a provision of the proposal that would allow the commission to subpoena private businesses to compare public-sector and private-sector wages.

The Platte Institute is a major supporter of the "Blueprint Nebraska" tax proposal. The plan, which had been in development since 2018, was introduced into the Nebraska Legislature in 2022 by state Senator Mike McDonnell, but did not pass. The bill would cut the state income tax (lowering the state's top income rate and eliminating state income tax for wage-earners who earned less than $50,000) and offset the lost revenue by expanding the state sales tax (by eliminating sales tax exemptions, and taxing services that are currently untaxed). Under the proposal, Nebraska's current tax exemption for doctors' bills and medical equipment would be reduced, and currently untaxed services (including auto repairs, plumbing, roofing, legal services, accounting services, haircuts, and event and concert tickets) would be taxable. The bill would also establish student loan forgiveness programs.

=== Health care ===
The Platte Institute opposed accepting Medicaid expansion under the Affordable Care Act.

In 2009, it commissioned a study about the cost of health care by Arduin, Laffer & Moore Econometrics. The study advocates for shifting more health-care costs onto patients.

=== County government ===
In 2009, the Platte Institute released a study which recommended reducing the number of Nebraska's counties, which stands at 93, as an administrative cost-saving measure.

=== Education ===
The Platte Institute has advocated school choice measures. In 2010, it commissioned a report on charter schools in Nebraska by the Pacific Research Institute (PRI). In 2011, it commissioned another report by the PRI to promote virtual schools in Nebraska.
