= Walt Golvin =

American baseball player (1894–1973)

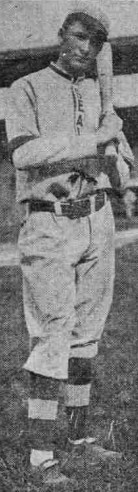
- First baseman
- Born: February 1, 1894; Hershey, Nebraska
- Died: June 11, 1973 (aged 79); Gardena, California
- Batted: Left Threw: Left

MLB debut
- April 15, 1922, for the Chicago Cubs

Last MLB appearance
- April 23, 1922, for the Chicago Cubs

MLB statistics
- Games played: 2
- At bats: 2
- Hits: 0
- Stats at Baseball Reference

Teams
- Chicago Cubs (1922)

Walter George Golvin (February 1, 1894 – June 11, 1973) was a first baseman in Major League Baseball, who played in two games for the 1922 Chicago Cubs.

He was married to Nora Golvin, who was born in Minnesota either in 1892 or 1895. She died on June 1, 1977.
