= Stapleton, Nebraska =

Village in and county seat of Logan County, Nebraska, United States

- Village
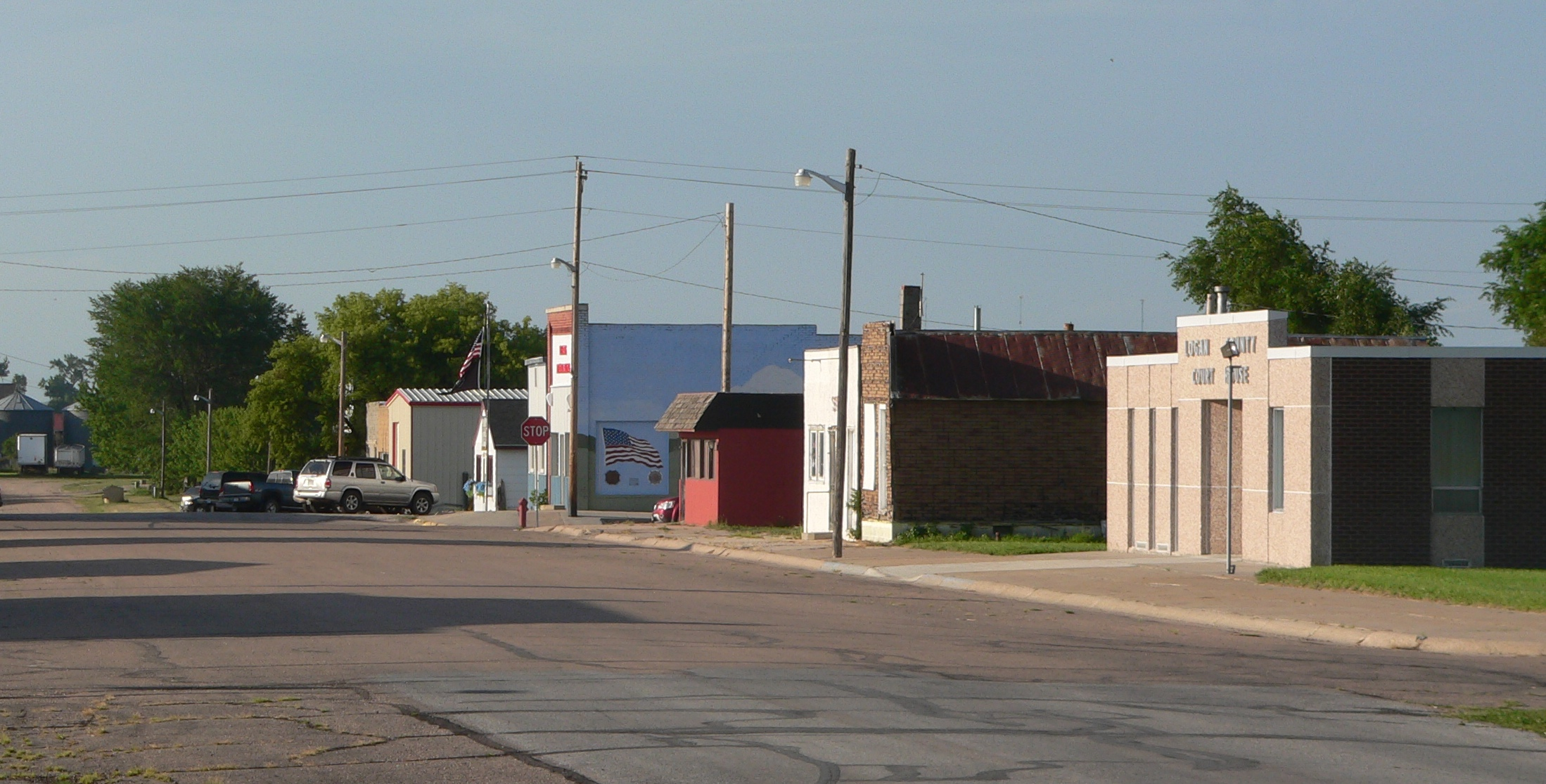
- Downtown Stapleton: Main Street

- Location of Stapleton, Nebraska
- Coordinates: 41°28′49″N 100°30′45″W
- Country: United States
- State: Nebraska
- County: Logan

Area
  - Total: 0.25 sq mi (0.65 km^{2})
  - Land: 0.25 sq mi (0.65 km^{2})
  - Water: 0 sq mi (0.00 km^{2})
- Elevation: 2,900 ft (880 m)

Population (2020)
  - Total: 267
  - Density: 1,064.5/sq mi (411.01/km^{2})
- Time zone: UTC-6 (Central (CST))
  - Summer (DST): UTC-5 (CDT)
- ZIP code: 69163
- Area code: 308
- FIPS code: 31-46870
- GNIS feature ID: 2399889
- Website: stapleton-ne.com

Stapleton is a village in and the county seat of Logan County, Nebraska, United States. The population was 267 at the 2020 census.

Stapleton is part of the North Platte, Nebraska Micropolitan Statistical Area.

== History ==
Stapleton was established in 1912 when the Union Pacific Railroad was extended to that point. It was named for Mr. Stapleton whose donation was instrumental in starting the town. In 2022, Stapleton passed a town ordinance banning abortion, the aiding & abetting of abortion, and the possession of abortion-inducing drugs.

== Geography ==
According to the United States Census Bureau, the village has a total area of 0.25 square miles (0.65 km^{2}), all land.

== Demographics ==
Historical population
Census	Pop.	Note	%±
1920	401		—
1930	431		7.5%
1940	399		−7.4%
1950	363		−9.0%
1960	359		−1.1%
1970	311		−13.4%
1980	340		9.3%
1990	299		−12.1%
2000	301		0.7%
2010	305		1.3%
2020	267		−12.5%
U.S. Decennial Census

=== 2010 census ===
As of the census of 2010, there were 305 people, 128 households, and 88 families residing in the village. The population density was 1,220.0 inhabitants per square mile (471.0/km^{2}). There were 150 housing units at an average density of 600.0 per square mile (231.7/km^{2}). The racial makeup of the village was 99.3% White, 0.3% African American, and 0.3% Asian. Hispanic or Latino of any race were 2.0% of the population.

There were 128 households, of which 32.8% had children under the age of 18 living with them, 57.0% were married couples living together, 7.8% had a female householder with no husband present, 3.9% had a male householder with no wife present, and 31.3% were non-families. 26.6% of all households were made up of individuals, and 14.8% had someone living alone who was 65 years of age or older. The average household size was 2.38 and the average family size was 2.82.

The median age in the village was 41.1 years. 26.2% of residents were under the age of 18; 4.9% were between the ages of 18 and 24; 23.6% were from 25 to 44; 24.9% were from 45 to 64; and 20.3% were 65 years of age or older. The gender makeup of the village was 49.8% male and 50.2% female.

=== 2000 census ===
As of the census of 2000, there were 301 people, 126 households, and 83 families residing in the village. The population density was 1,219.5 inhabitants per square mile (470.9/km^{2}). There were 144 housing units at an average density of 583.4 per square mile (225.3/km^{2}). The racial makeup of the village was 99.00% White, 0.33% Native American, and 0.66% from two or more races. Hispanic or Latino of any race were 1.00% of the population.

There were 126 households, out of which 31.7% had children under the age of 18 living with them, 56.3% were married couples living together, 7.1% had a female householder with no husband present, and 34.1% were non-families. 31.0% of all households were made up of individuals, and 16.7% had someone living alone who was 65 years of age or older. The average household size was 2.39 and the average family size was 3.05.

In the village, the population was spread out, with 29.6% under the age of 18, 4.0% from 18 to 24, 25.9% from 25 to 44, 21.9% from 45 to 64, and 18.6% who were 65 years of age or older. The median age was 40 years. For every 100 females, there were 92.9 males. For every 100 females age 18 and over, there were 92.7 males.

As of 2000 the median income for a household in the village was $33,125, and the median income for a family was $37,143. Males had a median income of $27,813 versus $25,625 for females. The per capita income for the village was $14,822. About 4.8% of families and 9.0% of the population were below the poverty line, including 10.2% of those under the age of eighteen and 13.0% of those 65 or over.

== Notable person ==
- C. Arlen Beam, federal judge

== See also ==
- List of municipalities in Nebraska
