= Hoagland, Nebraska =

Unincorporated community in Nebraska, U.S.

Coordinates: 41°30′30″N 100°22′16″W

Hoagland is an unincorporated community in Logan County, Nebraska, United States.

== History ==
A post office was established at Hoagland in 1912, and remained in operation until it was discontinued in 1944. The community was named for homesteader W. V. Hoagland.
