= James Pappas =

American politician

Member of the Nebraska Legislature from the 42nd district
- In office November 29, 1982 – December 20, 1987
- Preceded by: Myron Rumery
- Succeeded by: David Bernard-Stevens

Personal details
- Born: June 13, 1944 (age 82) Julesburg, Colorado
- Party: Republican (until 1985); Democratic (1985–present)
- Spouse: Jo Ann (m. 1964)
- Children: 2 (Amy Jo, James Jr.)
- Occupation: Real estate agent

James Pappas (born June 13, 1944) is an American politician from Nebraska who served as a member of the Nebraska Legislature from the 42nd district from 1982 to 1987. He was initially a Republican but switched to the Democratic Party in 1985.

== Early life ==
Pappas was born in Julesburg, Colorado, in 1944, and grew up in North Platte, Nebraska. He settled in Hershey, where worked as a farmer and served on the Hershey School Board. Pappas and his brothers jointly owned several businesses, including gasoline stations, a bulk plant, and a computer store.

== Nebraska Legislature ==
In 1982, following the decision by State Senator Myron Rumery not to seek re-election, Pappas ran to succeed him in the 42nd district, which was based in Lincoln County. Pappas faced three candidates in the primary: businessman Larry Bowley, North Platte City Councilwoman Corinne Jochum, and Gary Grabenstein, who dropped out of the race but still appeared on the ballot. Pappas placed first in the primary, winning 45 percent of the vote to Jochum's 31 percent, and they advanced to the general election. Pappas defeated Jochum by a wide margin, winning his first term in the legislature with 59 percent of the vote.

On November 14, 1982, Rumery died of cancer, and Governor Charles Thone appointed Pappas to serve out the remaining weeks of Rumery's term. He was sworn in on November 29, 1982.

Pappas switched to the Democratic Party, and announced his switch by appearing at the Nebraska Democratic Party's annual Jefferson–Jackson Dinner on April 13, 1985. In announcing his change, Pappas said, "I'd rather be a conservative Democrat than a liberal Republican. The Democrats don't care if you have a conservative, mdoerate or liberal label."

In 1986, Pappas ran for re-election to a second term. He was challenged by William Hord, a printing company owner and former Omaha World-Herald editor. Pappas placed first in the primary election, receiving 58 percent of the vote to Hord's 42 percent.

In September 1986, two months before the general election, Pappas, fellow State Senator Bernice Labedz, and several others were charged with petition fraud. Prosecutors brought two counts against Pappas: one for "circulating an initiative petition in a county in which he was not qualified and one county of falsely swearing to the signature of a circulator on an initiative petition." Pappas originally ceased his campaign and said that he would resign from the legislature, but reversed his decision, and said that he would continue to serve. He ended up narrowly defeating Hord, winning a second term with 50.3 percent of the vote.

Pappas was found guilty of one count of petition fraud on April 28, 1987. He argued that the statute he was convicted of violating was unconstitutional, and appealed to the Supreme Court of Nebraska. On December 10, 1987, Pappas announced that he would resign from the legislature, noting that it was "impossible to make a living and serve in the Legislature, and when you look at my particular situation, it is just impossible." Pappas resigned on December 20, 1987, and was succeeded by David Bernard-Stevens, who was appointed to serve out the remaining year of his term. On June 17, 1988, the Nebraska Supreme Court unanimously affirmed Pappas's conviction.
