= Don Pederson =

American politician (1928–2019)

Member of the Nebraska Legislature from the 42nd district
- In office 1996–2007
- Preceded by: David Bernard-Stevens
- Succeeded by: Tom Hansen

Personal details
- Born: December 23, 1928 Hastings, Nebraska, U.S.
- Died: June 2, 2019 (aged 90) Lincoln, Nebraska, U.S.
- Education: University of Nebraska

Don Pederson (December 23, 1928 – June 2, 2019) was an American politician from Nebraska. He served in the state legislature from 1996 to 2007.

== Personal life ==
Pederson was born December 23, 1928, in Hastings, Nebraska. He attended University of Nebraska Omaha, Grinnell College, and University of Nebraska. Pederson was a lawyer and lived in North Platte, Nebraska. He served on the North Platte Board of Education. Pederson was a member of many North Platte organizations, bar associations, and the Presbyterian Church of North Platte. He was the father of former Nebraska Cornhuskers athletic director Steve Pederson. Pederson died from pancreatic cancer in 2019 at the age of 90.

== Legislature service ==
He was appointed to the legislature on September 5, 1996, to replace David Bernard-Stevens who had resigned. He was then elected in 1996 to represent the 42nd Nebraska legislative district and reelected in 1998 and 2002. He sat on the Nebraska Retirement Systems, Building Maintenance, and Legislative Performance Audit committees. He was also a nonvoting member of the executive board and Reference committees and served as the chair of the Appropriations committee. Since Nebraska voters passed Initiative Measure 415 in 2001 limiting state senators to two terms after 2001, he was unable run for reelection in 2006.

== See also ==
- Nebraska Legislature
