= David Bernard-Stevens =

American politician

Member of the Nebraska Legislature from the 42nd district
- In office December 30, 1987 – August 15, 1996
- Preceded by: James Pappas
- Succeeded by: Don Pederson

Personal details
- Born: 1951 (age 74–75) Gothenburg, Nebraska
- Party: Republican
- Education: Nebraska Wesleyan University; American University; University of Nebraska–Lincoln (B.A.); Bellevue University (M.S.)
- Occupation: Teacher

David Bernard-Stevens (born 1951) is a Republican politician from Nebraska who served as a member of the Nebraska Legislature from the 42nd district from 1987 to 1996.

== Early life ==
Bernard-Stevens was born in Gothenburg, Nebraska, and attended Nebraska Wesleyan University and American University. While attending American, he worked as a press aide to U.S. Senator Roman Hruska, and ultimately graduated from the University of Nebraska–Lincoln with his bachelor's degree in political science. He received his teaching certificate and began teaching at Papillion High School, and was selected as Nebraska's Teacher of the Year in 1982. Bernard-Stevens subsequently taught at North Platte High School.

== Nebraska Legislature ==
In 1987, following the resignation of State Senator James Pappas from the legislature, Governor Kay A. Orr appointed Bernard-Stevens to fill the vacancy. Bernard-Stevens was sworn in on December 30, 1987. His appointment was condemned by local Republicans, who criticized Orr for not appointing Pappas's 1986 opponent, Bill Hord, to fill the vacancy.

A special election was held in 1988 for the remaining two years of Pappas's term, and though Hord was expected to run against Bernard-Stevens in the 1988 special election, he declined to run and instead decided to serve as Bernard Stevens's campaign manager. Bernard-Stevens was challenged by former North Platte Mayor Carl Bieber, and narrowly placed first in the primary, winning 54 percent of the vote to Bieber's 46 percent. They both advanced to the general election, where Bernard-Stevens won, 54–46 percent.

Bernard-Stevens ran for a full term in 1990. He was challenged by Lincoln County deputy sheriff Steven Bade, who attacked Bernard-Stevens for his opposition to a measure to require parental notification before minors could receive abortions. Bernard-Stevens was endorsed by Nebraska Voters for Choice, while Bade was supported by pro-life groups. In the primary election, Bernard-Stevens placed first by a wide margin, receiving 67 percent of the vote to Bade's 33 percent. They both advanced to the general election, where Bernard-Stevens won re-election in a landslide, 66–34 percent.

Bernard-Stevens ran for re-election in 1994, and was re-elected unopposed.

In 1996, Bernard-Stevens announced that he would resign from the legislature. He left office on August 15, 1996.

== Post-legislative career ==
Following his resignation from the legislature, Bernard-Stevens was appointed the president of the North Platte Chamber of Commerce. He received his master's degree in leadership at Bellevue University and later started a leadership development company.
