= Myron Rumery =

American politician (1905–1982)

Member of the Nebraska Legislature from the 42nd district
- In office January 8, 1975 – November 14, 1982
- Preceded by: J. James Waldron (redistricted)
- Succeeded by: James Pappas

Personal details
- Born: July 29, 1905 Julesburg, Colorado
- Died: November 15, 1982 (aged 77) North Platte, Nebraska
- Party: Democratic
- Spouse: Mattie Ella Washburn (m. 1934)
- Children: 2 (Myron, Margene)
- Education: Grand Island College; University of Nebraska (B.S.)
- Occupation: Teacher, agricultural researcher

Myron Rumery (July 29, 1905 – November 15, 1982) was a Democratic politician from Nebraska who served as a member of the Nebraska Legislature from the 42nd district from 1975 until his death in 1982.

== Early life ==
Rumery was born in Julesburg, Colorado, in 1905. He grew up in Mason City, Nebraska, and graduated from Mason City High School. Rumery attended Grand Island College and graduated from the University of Nebraska College of Agriculture. He taught high school for several years, and then joined the University of Nebraska's North Platte Station in 1943, where he supervised agricultural research and eventually served as the Station's acting superintendent.

== Nebraska Legislature ==
In 1974, following redistricting, the 42nd district, which was represented by J. James Waldron in the state legislature, was shifted to Cuming and Lincoln counties. Waldron opted to run for Congress rather than seek re-election, and Rumery ran to succeed him. In the nonpartisan primary, Rumery, a Democrat, faced Lorraine Orr, the former chair of the Nebraska Republican Party, and civic activist Robert Brownell. Rumery placed first in the primary election, winning 40 percent of the vote to Orr's 34 percent and Brownell's 26 percent, and he advanced to the general election with Orr. Rumery defeated Orr by a wide margin, winning his first term, 58–42 percent.

Rumery ran for re-election in 1978, and was re-elected unopposed. He declined to seek a third term in 1982.

== Death ==
Rumery died of cancer on November 14, 1982, several weeks prior to the end of his term.
