= Brady, Nebraska =

- Village
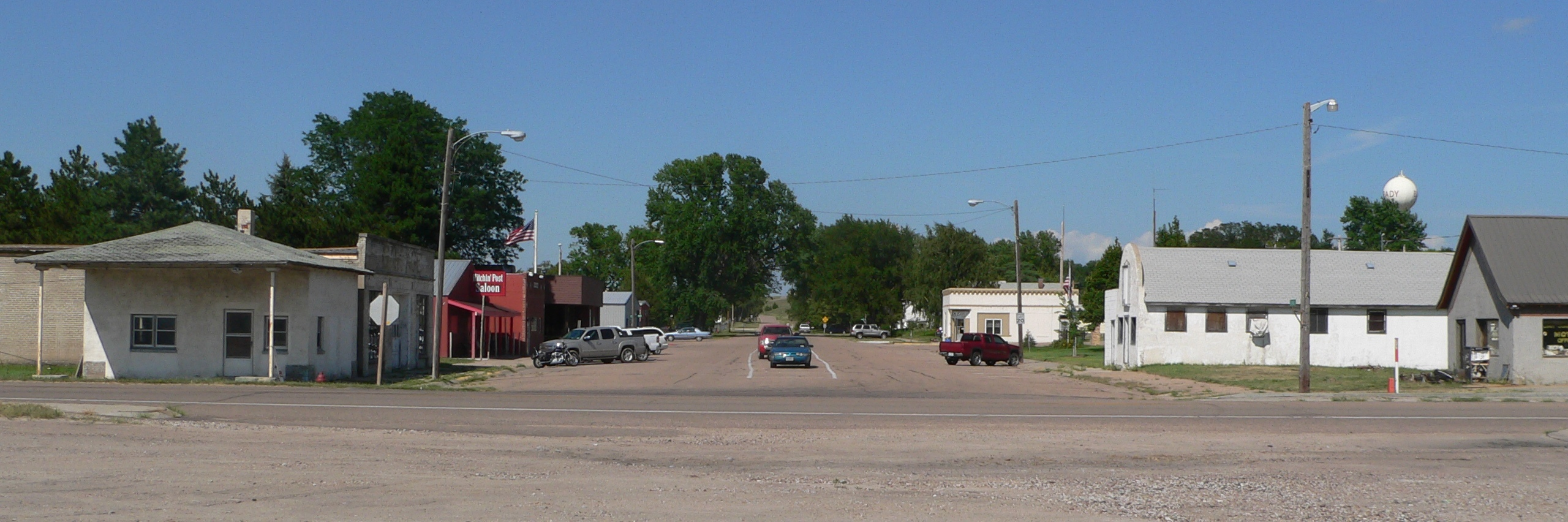
- Main Street in Brady

- Location of Brady, Nebraska
- Coordinates: 41°01′20″N 100°22′04″W
- Country: United States
- State: Nebraska
- County: Lincoln

Area
  - Total: 0.33 sq mi (0.85 km^{2})
  - Land: 0.33 sq mi (0.85 km^{2})
  - Water: 0 sq mi (0.00 km^{2})
- Elevation: 2,651 ft (808 m)

Population (2020)
  - Total: 383
  - Density: 1,167.3/sq mi (450.69/km^{2})
- Time zone: UTC-6 (Central (CST))
  - Summer (DST): UTC-5 (CDT)
- ZIP code: 69123
- Area code: 308
- FIPS code: 31-06085
- GNIS feature ID: 2398167
- Website: www.villageofbrady.org

Brady is a village in Lincoln County, Nebraska, United States. It is part of the North Platte, Nebraska Micropolitan Statistical Area. As of the 2020 census, Brady had a population of 383.

== History ==
Brady was laid out in 1889. The community was named for a trapper named Brady who was killed on what is known as Brady Island.

== Geography ==
According to the United States Census Bureau, the village has a total area of 0.33 square miles (0.85 km^{2}), all land.

=== Climate ===
Climate data for Brady, Nebraska(coordinates:41.0233°N 100.3669°W), 1991-2020
Month	Jan	Feb	Mar	Apr	May	Jun	Jul	Aug	Sep	Oct	Nov	Dec	Year
Mean daily maximum °F (°C)	39.7 (4.3)	43.9 (6.6)	55.9 (13.3)	64.4 (18.0)	73.5 (23.1)	82.6 (28.1)	88.5 (31.4)	86.4 (30.2)	79.7 (26.5)	66.8 (19.3)	52.5 (11.4)	40.9 (4.9)	64.6 (18.1)
Daily mean °F (°C)	26.9 (−2.8)	30.2 (−1.0)	40.7 (4.8)	49.7 (9.8)	60.1 (15.6)	70.2 (21.2)	75.7 (24.3)	73.5 (23.1)	65.3 (18.5)	51.8 (11.0)	38.4 (3.6)	28.0 (−2.2)	50.9 (10.5)
Mean daily minimum °F (°C)	14.0 (−10.0)	16.4 (−8.7)	25.5 (−3.6)	35.0 (1.7)	46.6 (8.1)	57.8 (14.3)	62.8 (17.1)	60.5 (15.8)	50.8 (10.4)	36.7 (2.6)	24.2 (−4.3)	15.1 (−9.4)	37.1 (2.8)
Average precipitation inches (mm)	0.42 (11)	0.66 (17)	1.06 (27)	2.48 (63)	3.75 (95)	3.74 (95)	3.11 (79)	2.38 (60)	1.72 (44)	1.77 (45)	0.56 (14)	0.55 (14)	22.2 (564)
Source: NOAA

== Demographics ==
Historical population
Census	Pop.	Note	%±
1910	308		—
1920	400		29.9%
1930	387		−3.2%
1940	460		18.9%
1950	320		−30.4%
1960	273		−14.7%
1970	311		13.9%
1980	377		21.2%
1990	331		−12.2%
2000	366		10.6%
2010	428		16.9%
2020	383		−10.5%
U.S. Decennial Census

=== 2010 census ===
As of the census of 2010, there were 428 people, 159 households, and 121 families residing in the village. The population density was 1,297.0 inhabitants per square mile (500.8/km^{2}). There were 177 housing units at an average density of 536.4 per square mile (207.1/km^{2}). The racial makeup of the village was 99.1% White, 0.2% African American, and 0.7% from two or more races. Hispanic or Latino of any race were 1.9% of the population.

There were 159 households, of which 41.5% had children under the age of 18 living with them, 63.5% were married couples living together, 7.5% had a female householder with no husband present, 5.0% had a male householder with no wife present, and 23.9% were non-families. 21.4% of all households were made up of individuals, and 7.5% had someone living alone who was 65 years of age or older. The average household size was 2.69 and the average family size was 3.17.

The median age in the village was 36.4 years. 31.8% of residents were under the age of 18; 4.1% were between the ages of 18 and 24; 24.4% were from 25 to 44; 23.8% were from 45 to 64; and 15.7% were 65 years of age or older. The gender makeup of the village was 48.8% male and 51.2% female.

=== 2000 census ===
As of the census of 2000, there were 366 people, 155 households, and 110 families residing in the village. The population density was 1,117.9 inhabitants per square mile (431.6/km^{2}). There were 170 housing units at an average density of 519.2 per square mile (200.5/km^{2}). The racial makeup of the village was 98.91% White, 0.27% Native American, 0.27% Asian, and 0.55% from two or more races. Hispanic or Latino of any race were 0.27% of the population.

There were 155 households, out of which 31.6% had children under the age of 18 living with them, 60.6% were married couples living together, 9.0% had a female householder with no husband present, and 29.0% were non-families. 27.1% of all households were made up of individuals, and 11.0% had someone living alone who was 65 years of age or older. The average household size was 2.36 and the average family size was 2.87.

The median age in Brady was 37 years. 26.0% of the population was under the age of 18; 8.7% was aged from 18 to 24; 27.0% from 25 to 44; 22.1% from 45 to 64; and 16.1% aged 65 years or older. For every 100 females, there were 92.6 males; for every 100 females aged 18 and older, there were 86.9 males.

The median age in the village was 36.4 years. 31.8% of residents were under the age of 18; 4.1% were between the ages of 18 and 24; 24.4% were from 25 to 44; 23.8% were from 45 to 64; and 15.7% were 65 years of age or older. The gender makeup of the village was 48.8% male and 51.2% female. The per capita income for the village was $14,024. About 12.5% of families and 15.3% of the population were below the poverty line, including 29.4% of those under age 18 and 10.3% of those age 65 or over.
