= North Platte micropolitan area =

- Micropolitan statistical area
- North Platte, NE Micropolitan Statistical Area
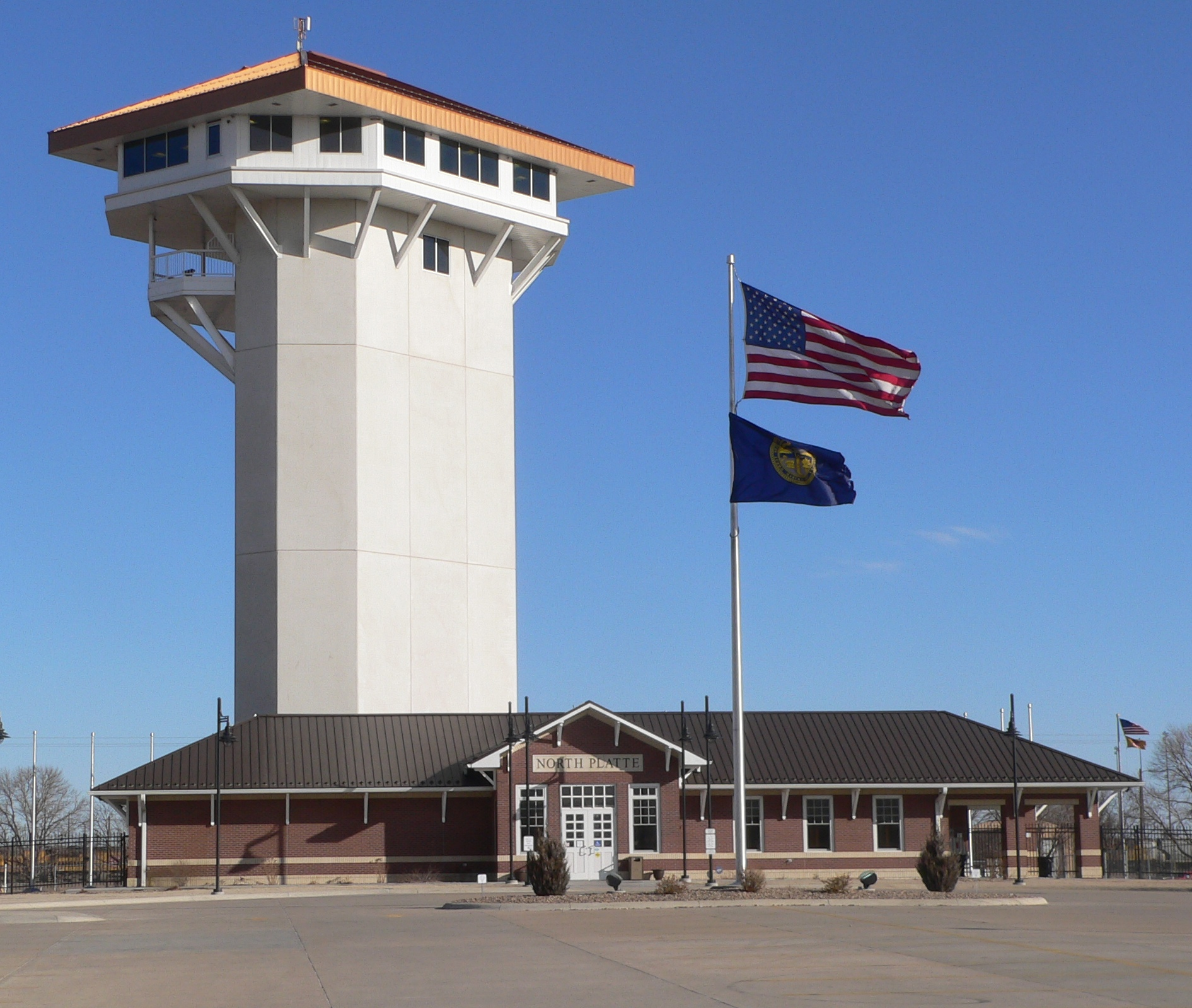
- Golden Spike Tower and Visitor Center at Union Pacific's Bailey Yards
Interactive Map of North Platte, NE μSA
City of North Platte
North Platte, NE μSA
- Country: United States
- State: Nebraska
- Largest city: North Platte
- Time zone: UTC−6 (CST)
  - Summer (DST): UTC−5 (CDT)

The North Platte micropolitan statistical area, as defined by the United States Census Bureau, is an area consisting of three counties in Nebraska anchored by the city of North Platte. As of the 2000 census, the area had a population of 35,939, and the 2010 census counted a population of 37,051.

Micropolitan statistical areas are labor market and statistical areas in the United States centered on an urban cluster (urban area) with a population of at least 10,000 but fewer than 50,000 people.

== Counties ==
- Lincoln
- Logan
- McPherson

== Communities ==
- Brady
- Gandy
- Hershey
- Maxwell
- North Platte (Principal City)
- Ringgold
- Stapleton
- Sutherland
- Tryon
- Wallace
- Wellfleet

== Demographics ==
As of the census of 2000, there were 35,939 people, 14,594 households, and 9,830 families residing within the USA. The racial makeup of the USA was 94.83% White, 0.53% African American, 0.51% Native American, 0.36% Asian, 0.02% Pacific Islander, 2.58% from other races, and 1.17% from two or more races. Hispanic or Latino of any race were 5.27% of the population.

The median income for a household in the USA was $31,814, and the median income for a family was $38,464. Males had a median income of $29,229 versus $17,517 for females. The per capita income for the USA was $15,563.

== See also ==
- Nebraska census statistical areas
