= Ben Kuroki =

United States Army Air Forces soldier

- Ben Kuroki in flight jacket
- Born: May 16, 1917; Gothenburg, Nebraska
- Died: September 1, 2015 (aged 98); Camarillo, California
- Military career
- Allegiance: United States
- Branch: United States Army Air Forces
- Service years: 1941–1946
- Rank: Technical Sergeant
- Nicknames: Most Honorable Son, Sad Saki (Note: A pun on "sad sack", a World War II-era phrase; see Sad Sack.)
- Conflicts: World War II
- Awards: Distinguished Service Medal; Distinguished Flying Cross (×3); Air Medal with oak leaf clusters (×5)

Ben Kuroki (Japanese: 黒木 勉, May 16, 1917 – September 1, 2015) was the only American of Japanese descent in the United States Army Air Forces to serve in combat operations in the Pacific theater of World War II. He flew a total of 58 combat missions over Europe, North Africa, and Japan during World War II. He was also an advocate for Japanese-Americans after World War II.

== Childhood and Army enlistment ==
Ben Kuroki was born in Gothenburg, Nebraska to Japanese immigrants, Shosuke and Naka (née Yokoyama) Kuroki on May 16, 1917; they had 10 children. When Ben was a year old the Kuroki family relocated to Hershey, Nebraska, where they owned and operated a farm. The Lincoln County town had a population of about 500. He attended Hershey High School and was the vice-president of his senior class, graduating in 1936.

After the Japanese attack on Pearl Harbor, Hawaii on December 7, 1941, Ben's father encouraged him and his brother Fred to enlist in the U.S. Military. The brothers were initially rejected by the recruiters in Grand Island, so they tried again at North Platte, where their enlistment was processed without any questions — perhaps, as a humorous story suggests, the recruiters thought that Kuroki was a Polish name. In retelling the enlistment story, Ben Kuroki said the recruiter in North Platte told him that nationality was not a problem as he made $2 for every recruit. Later, two other brothers, Bill and Henry Kuroki also served in the military during the war.

When Ben and Fred enlisted in the U.S. Army they were among the first Nisei to do so. After enlisting they were sent to basic training at Sheppard Field, Texas in January 1942, not much more than a month after the attack on Pearl Harbor.

== Military career ==
Assigned to the 93rd Bombardment Group at Fort Myers, Florida, he was told that Japanese Americans would not be allowed to serve overseas. In 1942 Kuroki petitioned his commanding officer and was allowed to work as a clerk for the Eighth Air Force at a base in England. The need for aerial gunners was high and after Kuroki volunteered, he was sent to gunnery school for two weeks and became a dorsal turret gunner on a B-24 Liberator, the most widely produced American heavy bomber to be used by Allied forces in World War II. Kuroki was in a B-24 that crash landed in Spanish Morocco and was captured by Spanish authorities. His crew was released by the Spanish after three months. After the U.S. Department of State secured his release, he returned to England and rejoined his squadron.

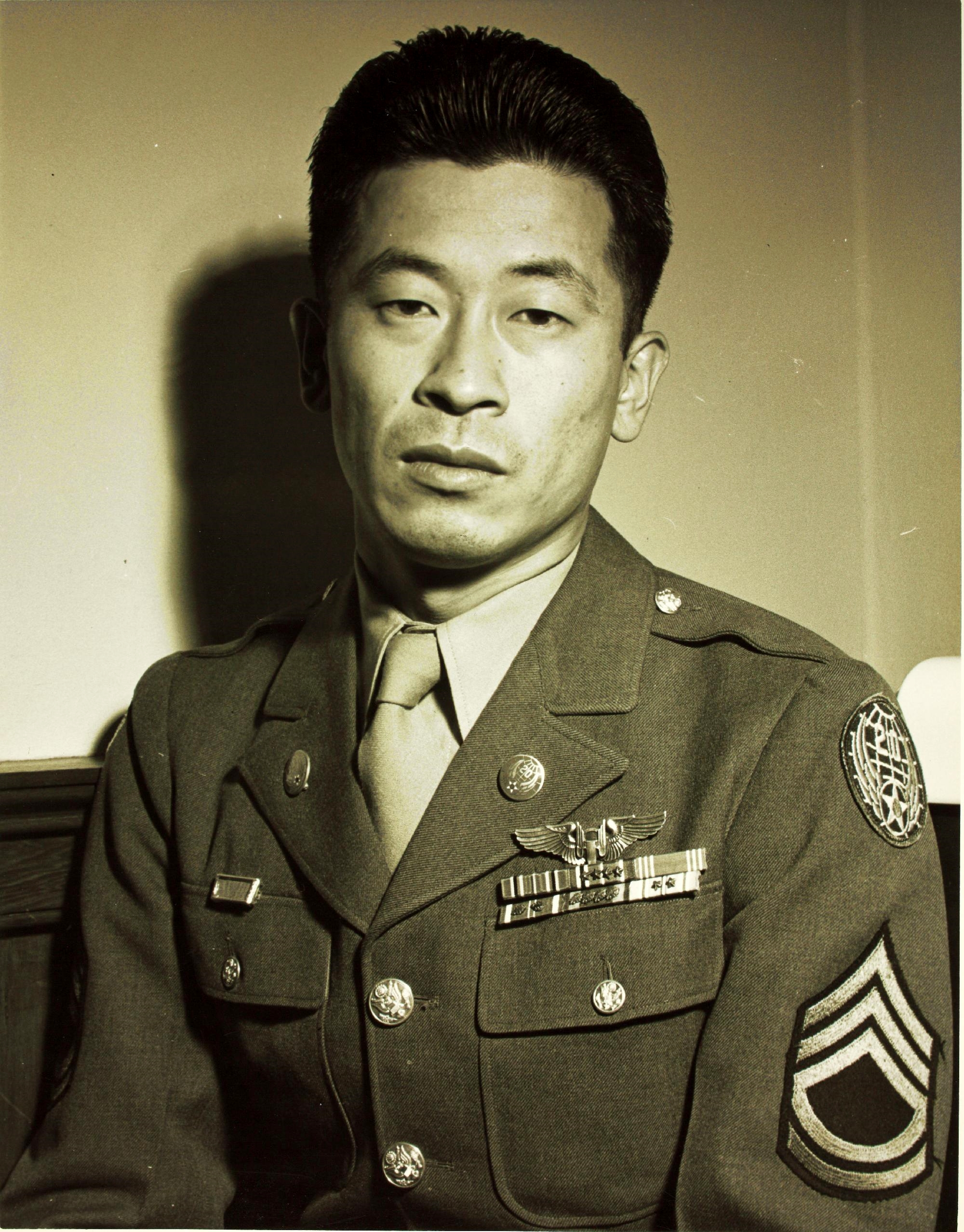
Technical Sergeant Ben Kuroki shown wearing Distinguished Flying Cross (×3), Air Medal with oak leaf clusters (×5) and service medals for World War II service

On August 1, 1943, he participated in the bombing mission known as Operation Tidal Wave, an effort to destroy the major oil refinery located in Ploiești, Romania. Kuroki flew 30 combat missions in the European theater, when the regular enlistment only required 25. After a medical review, he was allowed to fly 5 more missions above the mandated enlistment. Kuroki said he did so for his brother Fred, who was still stationed stateside. On his 30th mission he was slightly wounded when his gun turret was hit by flak.

During rest and recovery back in the United States, Kuroki was directed by the Army to visit a number of Japanese American internment camps in order to encourage able-bodied males to enlist in the U.S. military. Kuroki was the subject of a number of news articles including one in Time magazine.

Kuroki requested but was denied the opportunity to participate in the Pacific theater. Only after the intervention of Henry Stimson, the Secretary of War was that request granted. Kuroki was later permitted to join the crew of a B-29 Superfortress (who named its plane Sad Saki after Kuroki) in the 484th Squadron, 505th Bombardment Group, 20th U.S. Army Air Force, based on Tinian Island. Kuroki then participated in another 28 bombing missions over mainland Japan and other locations.

Kuroki is the only Japanese American known to have participated in air combat missions in the Pacific Theater of Operations during the war. Kuroki was awarded one Distinguished Flying Cross for his 25 missions in Europe and another for participation in the Ploiești raid. After another 28 missions in the Pacific Theater, Kuroki was awarded a third Distinguished Flying Cross as well as the Air Medal with five oak leaf clusters. By the end of the war, Ben Kuroki had completed 58 combat missions and was promoted to the rank of Technical Sergeant.

The New York Times recalled in an editorial on December 7, 1991, the 50th anniversary of the Japanese attack on Pearl Harbor, how “Gen. George Marshall asked to meet [Kuroki]; so did Generals Bradley, Spaatz, Wainwright and Jimmy Doolittle.”

== Advocacy efforts ==
Fiercely patriotic, but understanding first-hand some of the racial and other inequalities people of color had to endure, after the war Kuroki continued to speak about the need for racial equality and against racial prejudice. He engaged in a series of speaking tours discussing these issues, which he funded with his own savings and with minor donations, including proceeds from Ralph G. Martin's biography written about him entitled Boy From Nebraska: The Story of Ben Kuroki (1946).

When asked about his battle to overcome prejudice which almost prevented him from being allowed to participate in overseas aerial combat missions, Kuroki stated, "I had to fight like hell for the right to fight for my own country".

== Post-military career ==
Kuroki later attended the University of Nebraska, attaining a Bachelor's degree in journalism in 1950. He was a reporter and editor for a number of newspapers in several different states, retiring in 1984. On August 12, 2005, Kuroki was awarded the Distinguished Service Medal for his impressive combat participation during the war and for overcoming numerous incidents of prejudice. He was awarded an honorary Doctorate from the University of Nebraska–Lincoln on August 13, 2005, and is the subject of the Public Broadcasting Service documentary "Most Honorable Son: Ben Kuroki's Amazing War Story". On September 1, 2015, he died in hospice care in Camarillo, California at the age of 98.

== Awards ==

1st Row		Distinguished Service Medal		
2nd Row	Distinguished Flying Cross with two oak leaf clusters	Air Medal with five oak leaf clusters	Presidential Unit Citation	Good Conduct Medal
3rd Row	American Campaign Medal	European-African-Middle Eastern Campaign Medal with one silver and three bronze campaign stars	Asiatic-Pacific Campaign Medal with two bronze campaign stars	World War II Victory Medal

== See also ==
- History of Nebraska
- Frank Fujita, a Japanese-American soldier from Oklahoma who served with the "Lost Battalion", a US Army unit that was captured by the Japanese during the Dutch East Indies Campaign in 1942. He spent more than 3 years in Japanese captivity.

== Book list ==
- Martin, Ralph G. (1946). Boy from Nebraska: The Story of Ben Kuroki. New York: Harper & Brothers. OCLC 1287006
- Sterner, C. Douglas. (2007). Go for Broke: The Nisei Warriors of World War II Who Conquered Germany, Japan, and American Bigotry, Clearfield, Utah: American Legacy Media. ISBN 978-0-9796896-1-1 OCLC 141855086
- Yenne, Bill. (2007). Rising Sons: The Japanese American GIs Who Fought for the United States in World War II. New York: Macmillan. ISBN 978-0-312-35464-0
