= Mike Jacobson =

Nebraska politician

Member of the Nebraska Legislature from the 42nd district
- Incumbent
- Assumed office February 23, 2022
- Appointed by: Pete Ricketts
- Preceded by: Mike Groene

Personal details
- Born: Michael Jacobson
- Party: Republican
- Education: University of Nebraska–Lincoln (BS)

Michael Jacobson is an American politician, businessman, and banker serving as a member of the Nebraska Legislature from the 42nd district. Governor Pete Ricketts appointed him on February 23, 2022.

== Early life and education ==
Jacobson was raised on a Sutton, Nebraska farm and attended Sutton High School. He earned a Bachelor of Science degree in agricultural economics and education from the University of Nebraska–Lincoln and attended the University of Colorado Boulder's graduate banking program.

== Career ==
After graduating from college, Jacobson worked as a teacher and farmer in Red Cloud, Nebraska. He later worked as an agricultural lending officer for City National Bank in Hastings, Nebraska. He later worked as a senior vice president at the National Bank of Commerce in Lincoln, Nebraska. In 1998, Jacobson founded NebraskaLand Bank. Jacobson has also served as the North Platte Redevelopment Authority and North Platte Airport Authority chair. He was appointed to the Nebraska Legislature by Governor Pete Ricketts in February 2022, succeeding Mike Groene.

== Electoral history ==
Nebraska's 42nd Legislative District Election, 2022
Primary election
Party	Candidate	Votes	%
Republican	Chris Bruns	4,031	45.44
Republican	Mike Jacobson (incumbent)	3,885	43.79
Republican	Brenda Fourtner	956	10.78
Total votes		8,872	100.00
General election
Republican	Mike Jacobson (incumbent)	6,868	51.39
Republican	Chris Bruns	6,497	48.61
Total votes		13,365	100.00
Republican hold			
