= Logan County, Nebraska =

County in Nebraska, United States

- County
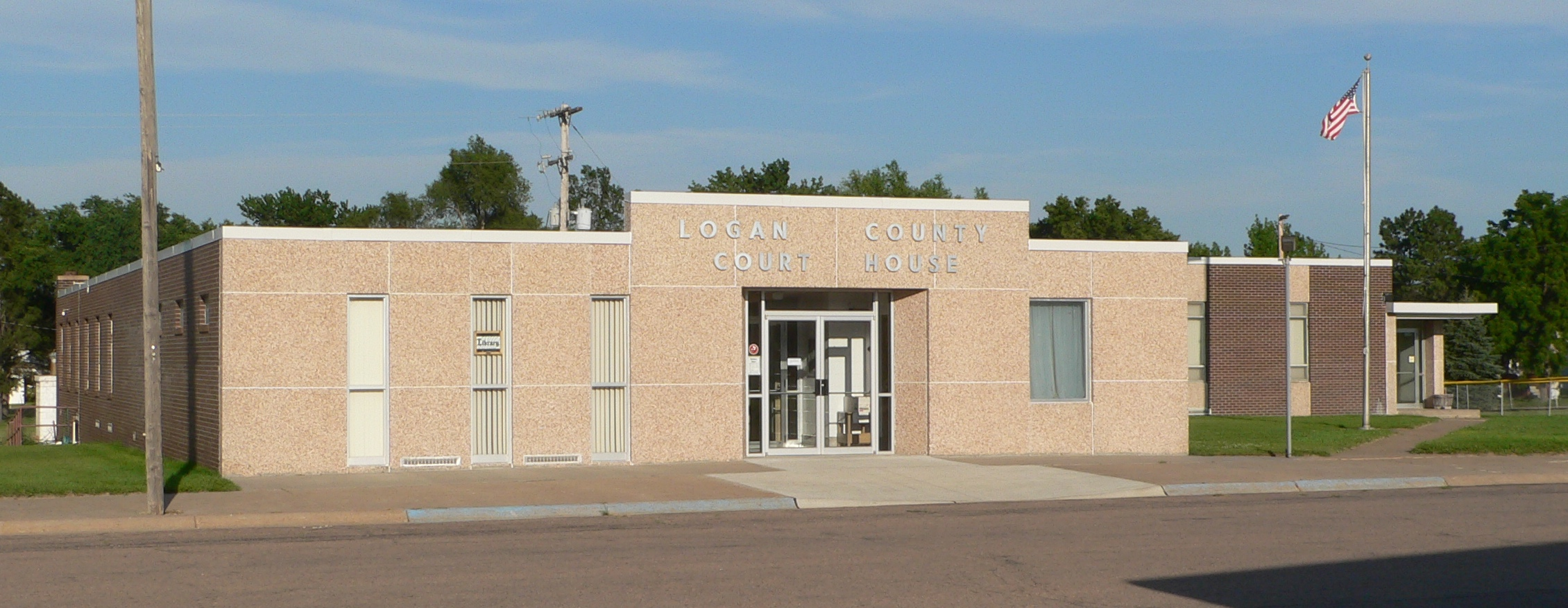
- The Logan County Courthouse in Stapleton

- Location within the U.S. state of Nebraska
- Coordinates: 41.5422°N 100.4437°W
- Country: United States
- State: Nebraska
- Founded: February 24, 1885
- Named for: John A. Logan
- Seat: Stapleton
- Largest village: Stapleton

Area
  - Total: 571.163 sq mi (1,479.31 km^{2})
  - Land: 570.698 sq mi (1,478.10 km^{2})
  - Water: 0.465 sq mi (1.20 km^{2}) 0.08%

Population (2020)
  - Total: 716
  - Estimate (2025): 669 ▼
  - Density: 1.25/sq mi (0.484/km^{2})
- Time zone: UTC−6 (Central)
  - Summer (DST): UTC−5 (CDT)
- Area code: 308
- Congressional district: 3rd
- Website: logancounty.ne.gov
- • Nebraska county number 57 • Nebraska license plate prefix 87

Logan County is a county in the U.S. state of Nebraska. As of the 2020 census, the population was 716, and was estimated to be 669 in 2025. The county seat and the largest village is Stapleton.

Logan County is part of the North Platte Micropolitan Statistical Area.

In the Nebraska license plate system, Logan County was represented by the prefix "87" (as it had the 87th-largest number of vehicles registered in the state when the license plate system was established in 1922).

== History ==
Logan County was created on February 24, 1885. It was named for Civil War General John A. Logan.

The first railroad was built through Logan County in 1911.

== Geography ==
According to the United States Census Bureau, the county has a total area of 571.163 square miles (1,479.31 km^{2}), of which 570.698 square miles (1,478.10 km^{2}) is land and 0.465 square miles (1.20 km^{2}) (0.08%) is water. It is the 57th-largest county in Nebraska by total area.

Logan County's terrain consists of low corrugated flatland, sparsely used for agricultural purposes at present. The ground slopes to the east-northeast, with precipitation runoff making its way to the Dismal River north of the county.

=== Major highways ===
- U.S. Highway 83
- Nebraska Highway 92

=== Adjacent counties ===
- Thomas County - north
- Blaine County - northeast
- Custer County - east
- Lincoln County - south
- McPherson County - west

== Demographics ==
Historical population
Census	Pop.	Note	%±
1890	1,378		—
1900	960		−30.3%
1910	1,521		58.4%
1920	1,596		4.9%
1930	1,014		−36.5%
1940	1,742		71.8%
1950	1,357		−22.1%
1960	1,108		−18.3%
1970	991		−10.6%
1980	983		−0.8%
1990	878		−10.7%
2000	774		−11.8%
2010	763		−1.4%
2020	716		−6.2%
2025 (est.)	669	▼	−6.6%
U.S. Decennial Census; 1790–1960 1900–1990; 1990–2000 2010–2020

=== 2020 census ===
As of the 2020 census, the county had a population of 716. The median age was 46.1 years. 24.6% of residents were under the age of 18 and 23.7% of residents were 65 years of age or older. For every 100 females there were 97.2 males, and for every 100 females age 18 and over there were 97.8 males age 18 and over.

The racial makeup of the county was 94.4% White, 0.0% Black or African American, 0.1% American Indian and Alaska Native, 0.6% Asian, 0.0% Native Hawaiian and Pacific Islander, 0.0% from some other race, and 4.9% from two or more races. Hispanic or Latino residents of any race comprised 3.2% of the population.

0.0% of residents lived in urban areas, while 100.0% lived in rural areas.

There were 286 households in the county, of which 31.1% had children under the age of 18 living with them and 17.5% had a female householder with no spouse or partner present. About 24.1% of all households were made up of individuals and 14.6% had someone living alone who was 65 years of age or older.

There were 367 housing units, of which 22.1% were vacant. Among occupied housing units, 82.5% were owner-occupied and 17.5% were renter-occupied. The homeowner vacancy rate was 1.1% and the rental vacancy rate was 10.7%.

=== 2000 census ===
As of the 2000 census, there were 774 people, 316 households, and 229 families residing in the county. The population density was 1 people per square mile (0.39 people/km^{2}). There were 386 housing units at an average density of 1 units per square mile (0.39/km^{2}). The racial makeup of the county was 98.58% White, 0.13% Black or African American, 1.03% Native American, and 0.26% from two or more races. 0.90% of the population were Hispanic or Latino of any race.

There were 316 households, of which 29.7% had children under 18 living with them, 66.5% were married couples living together, 3.8% had a female householder with no husband present, and 27.5% were non-families. 25.0% of all households were made up of individuals, and 12.7% had someone living alone who was 65 or older. The average household size was 2.45 and the average family size was 2.95.

The county population contained 27.3% under the age of 18, 4.4% from 18 to 24, 24.0% from 25 to 44, 26.7% from 45 to 64, and 17.6% who were 65 or older. The median age was 42. For every 100 females, there were 99.0 males. For every 100 females age 18 and over, there were 99.6 males.

The median household income was $33,125, and the median family income was $38,958. Men had a median income of $26,250 versus $18,906 for women. The per capita income was $14,937. About 6.5% of families and 10.5% of the population were below the poverty line, including 13.1% of those under 18 and 9.6% of those 65 or older.

== Communities ==
=== Villages ===
- Gandy
- Stapleton (county seat)

=== Unincorporated communities ===
- Hoagland

== Politics ==
Logan County voters have been reliably Republican for many decades. In only one presidential election since 1936 has the county selected the Democratic nominee (as of 2024).

Political Party	Number of registered voters (April 1, 2026)	Percent
Republican	443	80.99%
Independent	61	11.15%
Democratic	37	6.76%
Libertarian	6	1.10%
Legal Marijuana Now	0	0.00%
Total	547	100.00%

United States presidential election results for Logan County, Nebraska
Year	Republican		Democratic		Third party(ies)	
Year	No.	%	No.	%	No.	%
1900	107	49.77%	102	47.44%	6	2.79%
1904	100	55.56%	22	12.22%	58	32.22%
1908	140	44.73%	155	49.52%	18	5.75%
1912	97	25.33%	153	39.95%	133	34.73%
1916	172	35.10%	283	57.76%	35	7.14%
1920	312	57.78%	180	33.33%	48	8.89%
1924	277	40.56%	165	24.16%	241	35.29%
1928	595	74.38%	195	24.38%	10	1.25%
1932	346	37.32%	564	60.84%	17	1.83%
1936	410	46.91%	456	52.17%	8	0.92%
1940	498	60.51%	325	39.49%	0	0.00%
1944	450	64.84%	244	35.16%	0	0.00%
1948	254	52.16%	233	47.84%	0	0.00%
1952	447	74.13%	156	25.87%	0	0.00%
1956	367	71.26%	148	28.74%	0	0.00%
1960	391	70.58%	163	29.42%	0	0.00%
1964	267	47.42%	296	52.58%	0	0.00%
1968	363	66.36%	130	23.77%	54	9.87%
1972	320	81.42%	73	18.58%	0	0.00%
1976	283	57.29%	196	39.68%	15	3.04%
1980	442	82.46%	71	13.25%	23	4.29%
1984	446	86.77%	67	13.04%	1	0.19%
1988	373	79.70%	93	19.87%	2	0.43%
1992	271	60.09%	80	17.74%	100	22.17%
1996	294	65.63%	79	17.63%	75	16.74%
2000	336	81.55%	60	14.56%	16	3.88%
2004	357	83.22%	67	15.62%	5	1.17%
2008	327	78.61%	81	19.47%	8	1.92%
2012	356	82.60%	68	15.78%	7	1.62%
2016	400	88.30%	32	7.06%	21	4.64%
2020	407	90.44%	38	8.44%	5	1.11%
2024	409	92.53%	25	5.66%	8	1.81%
