= Butch Weis =

American baseball player (1901–1997)

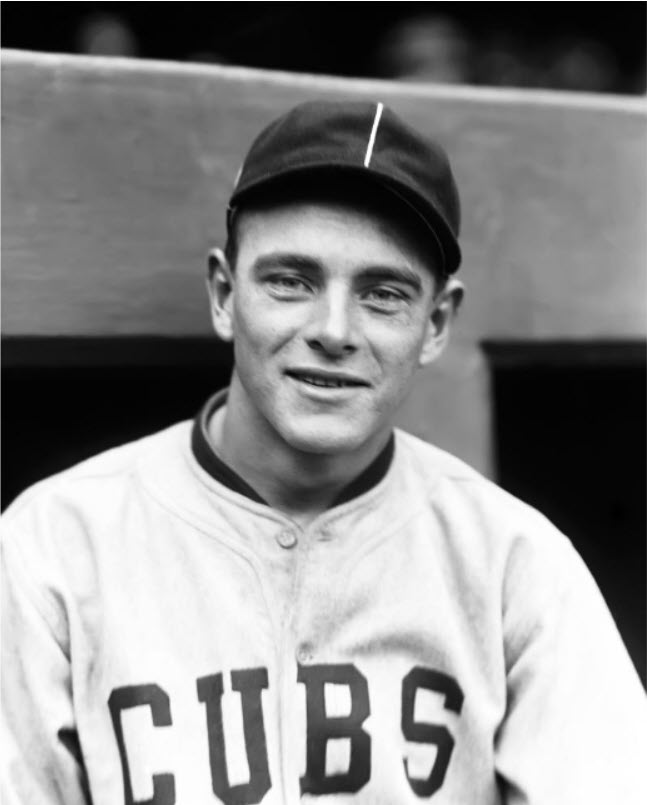
- Left fielder
- Born: March 2, 1901; St. Louis, Missouri, U.S.
- Died: May 4, 1997 (aged 96); St. Louis, Missouri, U.S.
- Batted: Left Threw: Left

MLB debut
- April 15, 1922, for the Chicago Cubs

Last MLB appearance
- October 2, 1925, for the Chicago Cubs

MLB statistics
- Batting average: .270
- Home runs: 2
- Runs batted in: 50
- Stats at Baseball Reference

Teams
- Chicago Cubs (1922–1925)

Arthur John "Butch" Weis (March 2, 1901 – May 4, 1997) was an American Major League Baseball left fielder who played for four seasons. He played for the Chicago Cubs from 1922 to 1925.
