= Tom Hansen (Nebraska politician) =

American politician (1946–2025)

Member of the Nebraska Legislature from the 42nd district
- In office 2007–2015
- Preceded by: Don Pederson
- Succeeded by: Mike Groene

Personal details
- Born: November 8, 1946 North Platte, Nebraska, U.S.
- Died: October 11, 2025 (aged 78)
- Education: University of Nebraska–Lincoln

Thomas Frederick Hansen (November 8, 1946 – October 11, 2025) was an American politician from the state of Nebraska. He served two terms in the Nebraska Legislature, from 2007 to 2015.

== Life and career ==
Hansen was born on November 8, 1946, in North Platte, Nebraska, and graduated from North Platte High School in 1965. He then earned a Bachelor of Science degree from the University of Nebraska–Lincoln in 1970. He was married and has two children. He was employed in the administration of his family's cattle ranching operation. Prior to his election to the State Legislature, Hansen served on the board of the Twin Platte Natural Resources District.

He was elected in 2006 to represent the 42nd Nebraska legislative district, which consists of Lincoln County. Because of the state's term-limits law, incumbent Don Pederson was ineligible to run for a third consecutive term. Hansen, North Platte businessman Mark Kaschke, and North Platte attorney Ron Ruff ran for the open seat. In the nonpartisan primary election, Hansen finished first with 42% of the vote, followed by Kaschke with 31%. In the general election, Hansen secured 57% of the vote to Kaschke's 43%.

In 2010, Hansen ran unopposed for re-election to his legislative seat.

Under Nebraska's term-limits law, Hansen could not run for a third consecutive term in 2014. He was succeeded by Mike Groene.

Hansen died on October 11, 2025, at the age of 78.
