= Buck Freeman (pitcher) =

American baseball player (1896–1953)

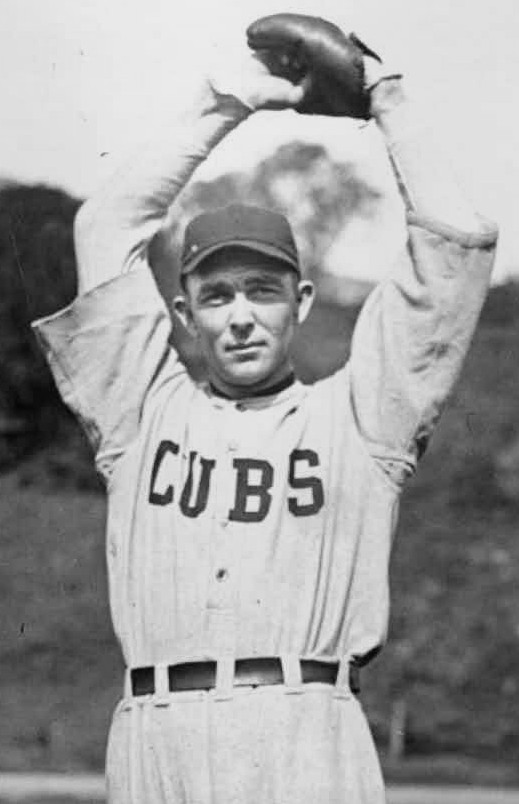
- Pitcher
- Born: July 5, 1896; Mart, Texas, U.S.
- Died: February 21, 1953 (aged 56); Fort Sam Houston, Texas, U.S.
- Batted: Both Threw: Right

MLB debut
- April 13, 1921, for the Chicago Cubs

Last MLB appearance
- June 10, 1922, for the Chicago Cubs

MLB statistics
- Win–loss record: 9–11
- Earned run average: 4.70
- Strikeouts: 52
- Stats at Baseball Reference

Teams
- Chicago Cubs (1921–1922)

Alexander Vernon "Buck" Freeman (July 5, 1896 – February 21, 1953) was an American Major League Baseball pitcher who played for the Chicago Cubs in 1921 and 1922.
