= Hooks Cotter =

American baseball player (1900–1955)

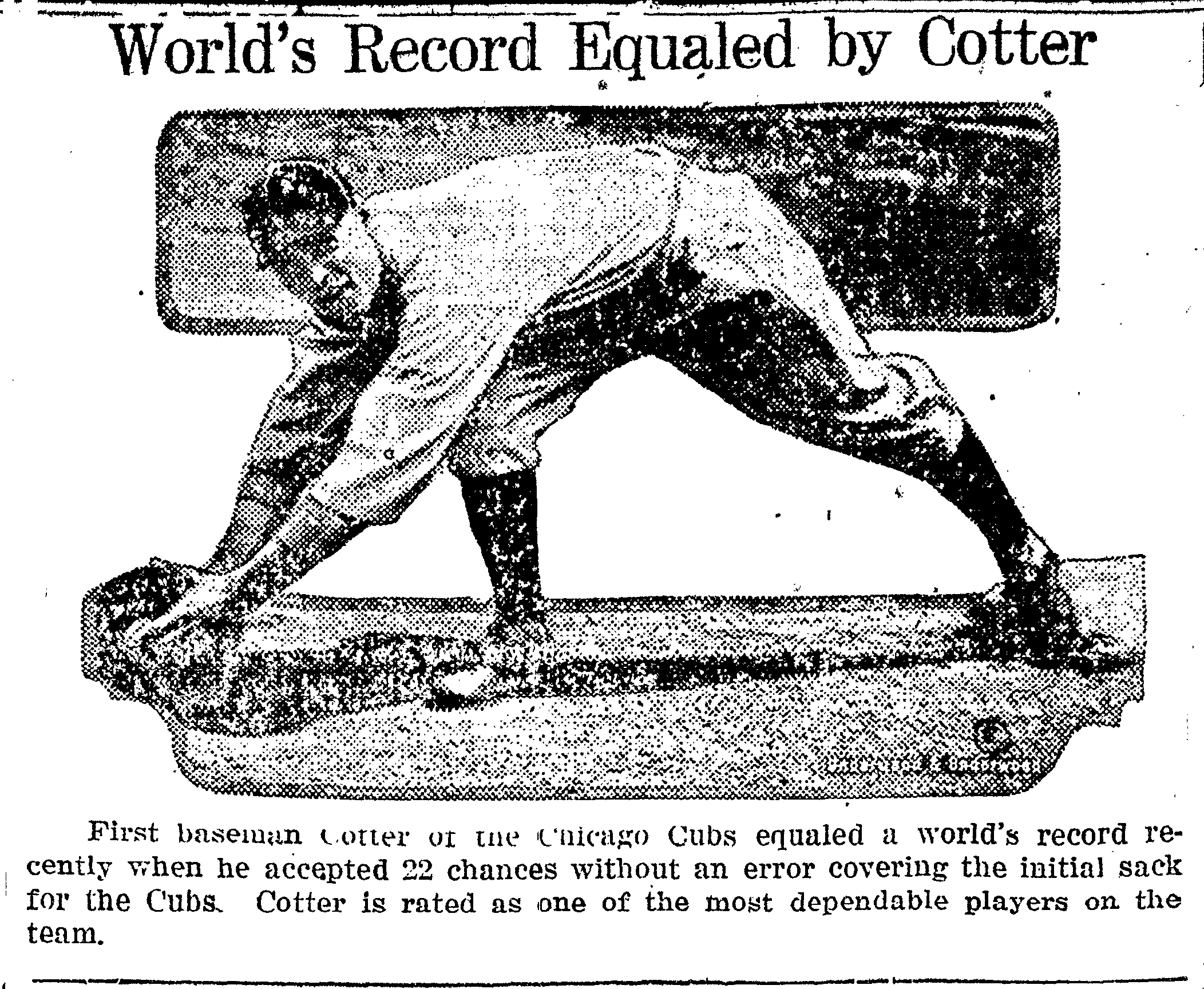
- First baseman
- Born: May 22, 1900; Holden, Missouri, U.S.
- Died: August 6, 1955 (aged 55); Los Angeles, California, U.S.
- Batted: Left Threw: Left

MLB debut
- April 15, 1922, for the Chicago Cubs

Last MLB appearance
- September 28, 1924, for the Chicago Cubs

MLB statistics
- Batting average: .264
- Home runs: 4
- Runs batted in: 33
- Stats at Baseball Reference

Teams
- Chicago Cubs (1922, 1924)

Harvey Louis "Hooks" Cotter (May 22, 1900 – August 6, 1955) was a first baseman in Major League Baseball. He played for the Chicago Cubs.
