= Virgil Cheeves =

American baseball player (1901–1979)

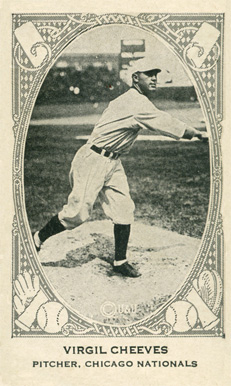
- Pitcher
- Born: February 12, 1901; Oklahoma City, Oklahoma, U.S.
- Died: May 5, 1979 (aged 78); Dallas, Texas, U.S.
- Batted: Right Threw: Right

MLB debut
- September 7, 1920, for the Chicago Cubs

Last MLB appearance
- May 13, 1927, for the New York Giants

MLB statistics
- Win–loss record: 26–27
- Earned run average: 4.73
- Strikeouts: 98
- Stats at Baseball Reference

Teams
- Chicago Cubs (1920–1923); Cleveland Indians (1924); New York Giants (1927)

Virgil Earl Cheeves (February 12, 1901 – May 5, 1979) was an American professional baseball player. He played in the major leagues for six seasons, as a pitcher. Nicknamed "Chief", he played for the Chicago Cubs from 1920 to 1923, the Cleveland Indians in 1924, and the New York Giants in 1927.
