= Gandy, Nebraska =

Village in Logan County, Nebraska, United States

- Village
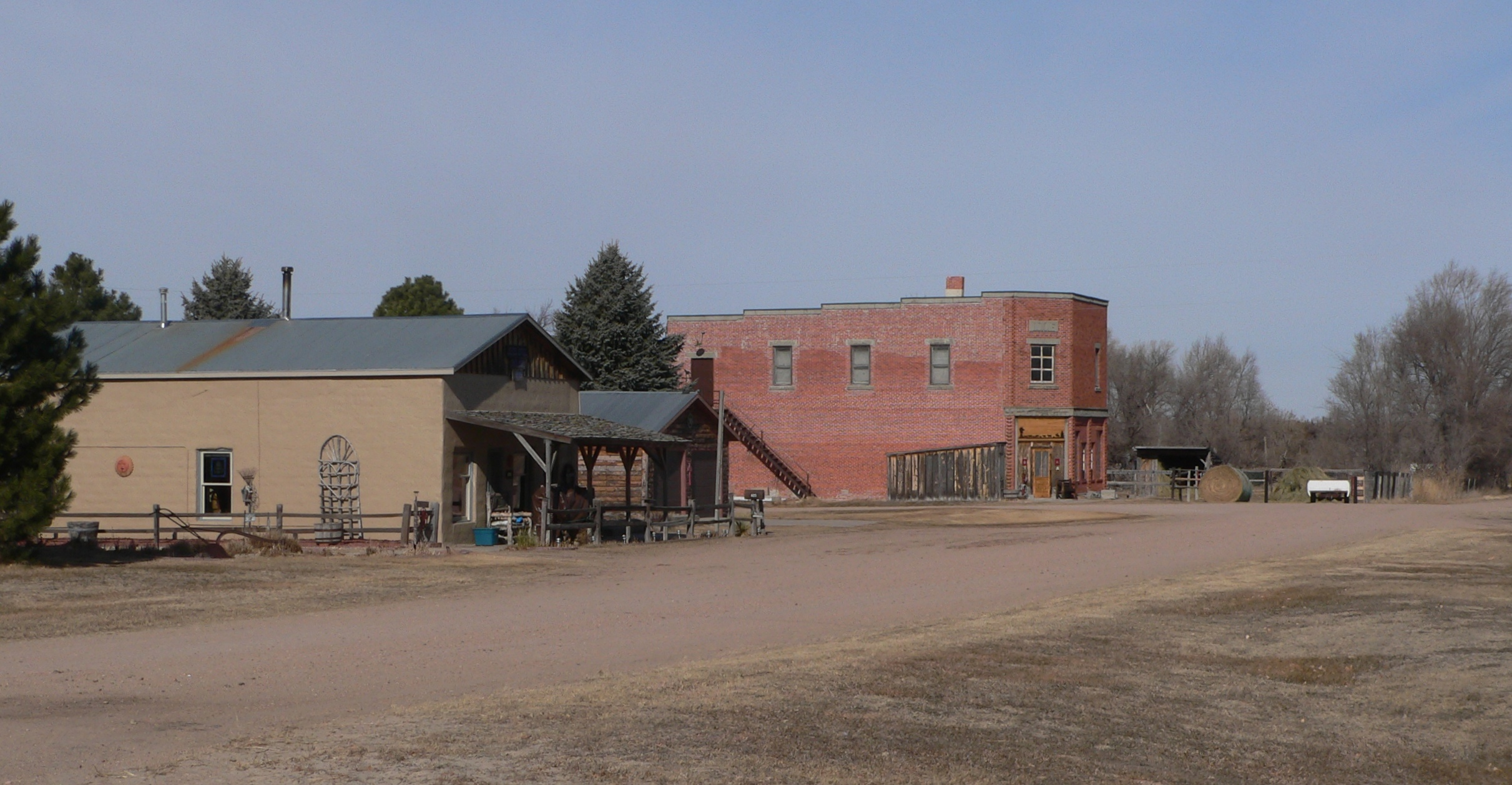
- Downtown Gandy: Broadway Avenue, looking north from 5th Street

- Location of Gandy, Nebraska
- Coordinates: 41°28′11″N 100°27′30″W
- Country: United States
- State: Nebraska
- County: Logan

Area
  - Total: 0.25 sq mi (0.64 km^{2})
  - Land: 0.25 sq mi (0.64 km^{2})
  - Water: 0 sq mi (0.00 km^{2})
- Elevation: 2,897 ft (883 m)

Population (2020)
  - Total: 34
  - Density: 138.4/sq mi (53.42/km^{2})
- Time zone: UTC-6 (Central (CST))
  - Summer (DST): UTC-5 (CDT)
- ZIP code: 69163
- Area code: 308
- FIPS code: 31-17950
- GNIS feature ID: 2398941

Gandy is a village in Logan County, Nebraska, United States. It is part of the North Platte, Nebraska Micropolitan Statistical Area. The population was 34 at the 2020 census.

== History ==
Gandy was the first seat of Logan County. An election on July 25, 1885, established the town of Gandy and named it the Logan County seat. Gandy was named after an early settler, Jim Gandy, who agreed to donate the land for the town in exchange for the naming rights. Gandy was the largest town in Logan County until a Union Pacific spur line bypassed it to the north, and terminated at a newly established town, Stapleton, in 1913. Gandy remained the county seat until an election held on May 2, 1929, changed the seat to Stapleton.

== Geography ==
According to the United States Census Bureau, the village has a total area of 0.25 square miles (0.65 km^{2}), all land.

== Demographics ==
Historical population
Census	Pop.	Note	%±
1920	191		—
1930	194		1.6%
1940	169		−12.9%
1950	88		−47.9%
1960	41		−53.4%
1970	50		22.0%
1980	53		6.0%
1990	51		−3.8%
2000	30		−41.2%
2010	32		6.7%
2020	34		6.3%
U.S. Decennial Census

=== 2010 census ===
As of the census of 2010, there were 32 people, 17 households, and 10 families residing in the village. The population density was 128.0 inhabitants per square mile (49.4/km^{2}). There were 22 housing units at an average density of 88.0 per square mile (34.0/km^{2}). The racial makeup of the village was 100.0% White.

There were 17 households, of which 5.9% had children under the age of 18 living with them, 52.9% were married couples living together, 5.9% had a female householder with no husband present, and 41.2% were non-families. 35.3% of all households were made up of individuals, and 17.6% had someone living alone who was 65 years of age or older. The average household size was 1.88 and the average family size was 2.40.

The median age in the village was 60.5 years. 9.4% of residents were under the age of 18; 0.0% were between the ages of 18 and 24; 6.2% were from 25 to 44; 50% were from 45 to 64; and 34.4% were 65 years of age or older. The gender makeup of the village was 43.8% male and 56.3% female.

=== 2000 census ===
As of the census of 2000, there were 30 people, 14 households, and 9 families residing in the village. The population density was 122.7 inhabitants per square mile (47.4/km^{2}). There were 17 housing units at an average density of 69.5 per square mile (26.8/km^{2}). The racial makeup of the village was 100.00% White.

There were 14 households, out of which 14.3% had children under the age of 18 living with them, 71.4% were married couples living together, and 28.6% were non-families. 28.6% of all households were made up of individuals, and 21.4% had someone living alone who was 65 years of age or older. The average household size was 2.14 and the average family size was 2.60.

In the village, the population was spread out, with 13.3% under the age of 18, 6.7% from 18 to 24, 26.7% from 25 to 44, 36.7% from 45 to 64, and 16.7% who were 65 years of age or older. The median age was 46 years. For every 100 females, there were 87.5 males. For every 100 females age 18 and over, there were 85.7 males.

As of 2000 the median income for a household in the village was $24,167, and the median income for a family was $47,500. Males had a median income of $48,125 versus $9,375 for females. The per capita income for the village was $20,650. There were no families and 20.8% of the population living below the poverty line, including no under eighteens and 50.0% of those over 64.

== See also ==
- List of municipalities in Nebraska
