= Uel Eubanks =

American baseball player (1903–1954)

- Pitcher
- Born: February 14, 1903; Quinlan, Texas
- Died: November 21, 1954 (aged 51); Dallas, Texas
- Batted: Right Threw: Right

MLB debut
- July 20, 1922, for the Chicago Cubs

Last MLB appearance
- August 25, 1922, for the Chicago Cubs

MLB statistics
- Win–loss record: 0–0
- Earned run average: 27.00
- Strikeouts: 1
- Stats at Baseball Reference

Teams
- Chicago Cubs (1922)

Uel Melvin Eubanks (February 14, 1903 – November 21, 1954) was a pitcher for the Chicago Cubs from July 20, 1922, to August 25, 1922. Eubanks pitched in two career games, one of which is the highest-scoring game in modern MLB history, a 26-23 Cubs victory over the Philadelphia Phillies. Eubanks gave up eight runs in 2/3 of an inning in this game.

Eubanks hit a double in his only at-bat in Major League Baseball, thus retiring with a 1.000 batting average for the Cubs. After his brief stint in the majors, he spent six years playing for minor league teams.

== Personal life ==
Eubanks was known for being a heavy drinker, and according to Baseball Almanac, he was arrested for possession of alcohol during Prohibition. He died at age 51 on November 21, 1954 from a cerebral hemorrhage.
