= Olean, Colfax County, Nebraska =

Unincorporated community in Nebraska, U.S.

Coordinates: 41°44′10″N 96°56′43″W

Olean is an unincorporated community in Colfax County, Nebraska, United States.

== History ==
A post office was established at Olean in 1873, and remained in operation until it was discontinued in 1877.
