= Hershey, Nebraska =

- Village
- Downtown Hershey

- Location of Hershey, Nebraska
- Coordinates: 41°09′36″N 101°00′17″W
- Country: United States
- State: Nebraska
- County: Lincoln

Area
  - Total: 0.76 sq mi (1.98 km^{2})
  - Land: 0.76 sq mi (1.98 km^{2})
  - Water: 0 sq mi (0.00 km^{2})
- Elevation: 2,900 ft (880 m)

Population (2020)
  - Total: 649
  - Density: 850/sq mi (328.3/km^{2})
- Time zone: UTC-6 (Central (CST))
  - Summer (DST): UTC-5 (CDT)
- ZIP code: 69143
- Area code: 308
- FIPS code: 31-22290
- GNIS feature ID: 2398496
- Website: www.villageofhershey.com

Hershey is a village in Lincoln County, Nebraska, United States. It is part of the North Platte, Nebraska Micropolitan Statistical Area. As of the 2020 census, Hershey had a population of 649.

== History ==
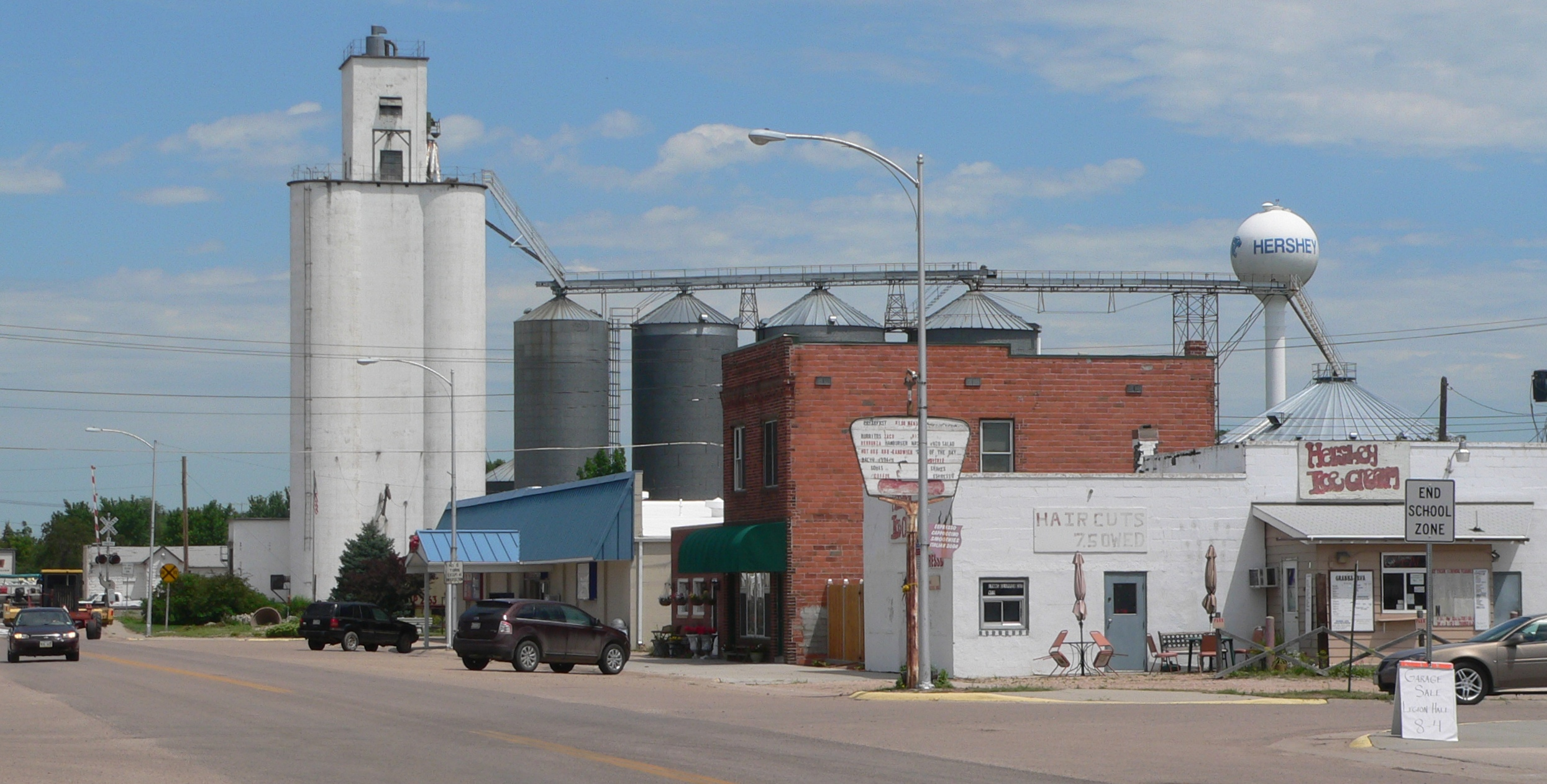
Street view

=== Beginnings ===
Hershey was established as a station on the Union Pacific Railroad. It was named for J. H. Hershey, a pioneer settler. The locations of the pre-existing O'Fallon's and Nichol's Stations are shown on an 1884 map of Lincoln County. An 1894 map shows the Hershey Station, to the west of Nichol's Station. The original town—consisting of 24 lots laid out in two square blocks—was platted on February 5, 1892, by Annie S. Guthrie.

=== Hershey in 1900 ===
By 1900, Hershey had about 20 resident families and a population of 80. This included a blacksmith (Alfred Leister), two merchants (Joseph Strickler and Martin Mickelsen), a lumberman (Weston Hill), a liveryman (Horace Stone), a doctor (William Eves), a postmaster (John Pricket), a minister (William Evans), and two railroad foremen. There were about 64 farm families (including laborers working for others) in the surrounding Nichols Precinct. Most families were of American origin, although there were five German families, and one or two each of Swedish, French, Scottish, Dutch, Bohemian and Canadian background. The village was incorporated in April 1909.

=== From 1900 to 1920 ===
Between 1900 and 1920, Hershey grew rapidly and added the structural foundation, commercial attractions, and social amenities of an important economic center for the surrounding area. A local newspaper, the Hershey Times, began publication in 1911. In 1913, a bond issue was approved providing for public water and electric lights. A telephone exchange was introduced in 1914. Businesses in Hershey in 1920, in addition to those present in 1900, included two mills (one of which, an alfalfa mill, burned in March 1920), two elevators, a hotel, two banks, three agricultural implement dealers, a cement works, an automobile dealer, a garage, a tire store, a meat market, a drug store, a restaurant, a number of dealers in agricultural products, including stock and hay, a barber, and an Opera House. There were three churches, the Methodist, Presbyterian (54 members), and Lutheran (40 members), and a number of fraternal organizations, including the Odd Fellows (63 members), Yeomanry (39 members), Modern Woodmen of the World, Royal Neighbors and Mystic Legion.

=== Agricultural context ===
Hershey is located between the North and South Platte rivers in the midst of good agricultural land, much of it irrigated. From an early date, agricultural production emphasized stock raising, alfalfa, and sugar beets. The sugar beet industry was encouraged by a tariff on sugar enacted in 1897. In 1905, there were 721 acres in Nicols Precinct planted to sugar beets. Shipments from Hershey in 1919 included 904 rail carloads of hay and 279 carloads of sugar beets. While the sugar content of the beets raised near Hershey was high, the volume was long insufficient to support a processing plant.

=== Further immigration ===
Both the railroad and the sugar beet industries were labor intensive, attracting additional immigrant groups to supply that labor. These groups included Russian Germans (ethnic Germans from Russia), Japanese and Mexicans. In 1900, there were three Russian families in the Hershey area (Henry Haff, George Amen, and Conrad Amen), two of whom had become farmers in their own right. By 1910, there had been a substantial influx of Swedish settlers, most engaged in farming. There were also two households of Japanese men in Nichols Precinct, without wives, one consisting of seven men working for the railroad and one of four men engaged in farming. By 1920, there were eight Japanese families in Hershey itself, all engaged in farming. The Mexican community repeated the pattern: in 1920, there were three Mexican households in Hershey, including young men working for the railroad. By the late 1920s, there were 19 Mexican families in Hershey. Both the Japanese and Mexican families were important parts of the community thereafter.

== Geography ==
Hershey is located on the Union Pacific Railroad's Overland Route.

According to the United States Census Bureau, the village has a total area of 0.61 square miles (1.58 km^{2}), all land.

=== Climate ===
Climate data for Hershey 5 SSE, Nebraska (1991–2020 normals, extremes 1965–present)
Month	Jan	Feb	Mar	Apr	May	Jun	Jul	Aug	Sep	Oct	Nov	Dec	Year
Record high °F (°C)	74 (23)	80 (27)	90 (32)	95 (35)	100 (38)	110 (43)	110 (43)	109 (43)	104 (40)	94 (34)	86 (30)	75 (24)	110 (43)
Mean maximum °F (°C)	61.2 (16.2)	66.4 (19.1)	76.9 (24.9)	84.8 (29.3)	90.8 (32.7)	96.7 (35.9)	100.3 (37.9)	98.1 (36.7)	95.3 (35.2)	87.3 (30.7)	74.3 (23.5)	63.6 (17.6)	101.5 (38.6)
Mean daily maximum °F (°C)	38.9 (3.8)	42.0 (5.6)	52.8 (11.6)	61.5 (16.4)	71.4 (21.9)	82.5 (28.1)	88.3 (31.3)	86.5 (30.3)	79.1 (26.2)	65.4 (18.6)	51.4 (10.8)	40.5 (4.7)	63.4 (17.4)
Daily mean °F (°C)	26.6 (−3.0)	29.3 (−1.5)	38.6 (3.7)	47.2 (8.4)	57.8 (14.3)	68.6 (20.3)	74.3 (23.5)	72.4 (22.4)	64.0 (17.8)	50.5 (10.3)	37.7 (3.2)	28.1 (−2.2)	49.6 (9.8)
Mean daily minimum °F (°C)	14.4 (−9.8)	16.5 (−8.6)	24.3 (−4.3)	33.0 (0.6)	44.1 (6.7)	54.8 (12.7)	60.4 (15.8)	58.3 (14.6)	48.8 (9.3)	35.7 (2.1)	23.9 (−4.5)	15.7 (−9.1)	35.8 (2.1)
Mean minimum °F (°C)	−6.0 (−21.1)	−2.1 (−18.9)	6.5 (−14.2)	19.0 (−7.2)	31.4 (−0.3)	43.8 (6.6)	51.7 (10.9)	49.2 (9.6)	35.3 (1.8)	19.7 (−6.8)	7.9 (−13.4)	−2.1 (−18.9)	−10.8 (−23.8)
Record low °F (°C)	−23 (−31)	−27 (−33)	−15 (−26)	5 (−15)	23 (−5)	28 (−2)	42 (6)	41 (5)	22 (−6)	2 (−17)	−7 (−22)	−31 (−35)	−31 (−35)
Average precipitation inches (mm)	0.23 (5.8)	0.43 (11)	0.85 (22)	1.99 (51)	3.33 (85)	3.82 (97)	2.68 (68)	2.21 (56)	1.58 (40)	1.79 (45)	0.38 (9.7)	0.29 (7.4)	19.58 (497)
Average snowfall inches (cm)	3.7 (9.4)	6.3 (16)	4.0 (10)	4.0 (10)	0.1 (0.25)	0.0 (0.0)	0.0 (0.0)	0.0 (0.0)	0.1 (0.25)	1.6 (4.1)	2.2 (5.6)	4.9 (12)	26.9 (68)
Average precipitation days (≥ 0.01 in)	3.0	4.2	5.1	7.5	10.1	9.3	8.1	6.2	5.8	5.6	3.2	3.1	71.2
Average snowy days (≥ 0.1 in)	2.8	3.6	2.3	1.7	0.0	0.0	0.0	0.0	0.0	0.7	1.6	2.6	15.3
Source: NOAA

== Demographics ==
Historical population
Census	Pop.	Note	%±
1910	332		—
1920	482		45.2%
1930	473		−1.9%
1940	487		3.0%
1950	573		17.7%
1960	504		−12.0%
1970	526		4.4%
1980	633		20.3%
1990	579		−8.5%
2000	572		−1.2%
2010	665		16.3%
2020	649		−2.4%
U.S. Decennial Census

=== 2010 census ===
As of the census of 2010, there were 665 people, 266 households, and 193 families residing in the village. The population density was 1,090.2 inhabitants per square mile (420.9/km^{2}). There were 292 housing units at an average density of 478.7 per square mile (184.8/km^{2}). The racial makeup of the village was 90.5% White, 0.3% African American, 0.8% Native American, 0.3% Asian, 5.6% from other races, and 2.6% from two or more races. Hispanic or Latino of any race were 8.9% of the population.

There were 266 households, of which 34.2% had children under the age of 18 living with them, 57.9% were married couples living together, 7.9% had a female householder with no husband present, 6.8% had a male householder with no wife present, and 27.4% were non-families. 21.1% of all households were made up of individuals, and 8.6% had someone living alone who was 65 years of age or older. The average household size was 2.50 and the average family size was 2.94.

The median age in the village was 40.6 years. 25.9% of residents were under the age of 18; 5.7% were between the ages of 18 and 24; 23.7% were from 25 to 44; 30.3% were from 45 to 64; and 14.6% were 65 years of age or older. The gender makeup of the village was 49.0% male and 51.0% female.

=== 2000 census ===
As of the census of 2000, there were 572 people, 232 households, and 167 families residing in the village. The population density was 1,142.4 inhabitants per square mile (441.1/km^{2}). There were 249 housing units at an average density of 497.3 per square mile (192.0/km^{2}). The racial makeup of the village was 91.61% White, 0.17% African American, 0.52% Asian, 6.82% from other races, and 0.87% from two or more races. Hispanic or Latino of any race were 9.62% of the population.

There were 232 households, out of which 34.9% had children under the age of 18 living with them, 57.8% were married couples living together, 10.8% had a female householder with no husband present, and 27.6% were non-families. 23.7% of all households were made up of individuals, and 11.6% had someone living alone who was 65 years of age or older. The average household size was 2.47 and the average family size was 2.93.

In the village, the population was spread out, with 28.1% under the age of 18, 7.2% from 18 to 24, 25.7% from 25 to 44, 26.0% from 45 to 64, and 12.9% who were 65 years of age or older. The median age was 38 years. For every 100 females, there were 88.8 males. For every 100 females age 18 and over, there were 89.4 males.

As of 2000 the median income for a household in the village was $36,875, and the median income for a family was $43,000. Males had a median income of $31,500 versus $16,848 for females. The per capita income for the village was $15,791. About 9.7% of families and 9.9% of the population were below the poverty line, including 8.7% of those under age 18 and 11.9% of those age 65 or over.

== Notable people ==
- Ben Kuroki
- Walt Golvin, baseball player
