= List of Chicago Cubs managers =

The Chicago Cubs are a professional baseball team based in Chicago, Illinois. The Cubs are members of the National League (NL) Central Division in Major League Baseball (MLB). In baseball, the head coach of a team is called the manager, or more formally, the field manager. The duties of the team manager include team strategy and leadership on and off the field. Since their inception as the White Stockings in 1876, the Cubs have employed 61 managers. The franchise's first manager was Baseball Hall of Famer Albert Spalding, who helped the White Stockings become the first champions of the newly formed National League.

After co-managing with Silver Flint during the 1879 Chicago White Stockings season, Hall of Famer Cap Anson began an 18-year managerial tenure in 1880, the longest in franchise history. Under Anson, the team won five more NL pennants — in 1880, 1881, 1882, 1885 and 1886—tying the 1885 World Series and losing the 1886 World Series in the process.^{[a]} Anson won 1,283 games as the White Stockings' manager, the most in franchise history. After taking over for Hall of Fame manager Frank Selee in 1905, Frank Chance — another Hall of Famer — managed the team through the 1912 season. During his tenure, the franchise won four more NL pennants in 1906, 1907, 1908, and 1910, winning its only two World Series titles in 1907 and 1908 until 2016 Chance's .664 career winning percentage is the highest of any Cubs manager. After Chance, from 1913 through 1960, the Cubs employed nineteen managers, nine of which were inducted into the Hall of Fame. During this period, the Cubs won six more NL pennants, including three under manager Charlie Grimm. Split between Grimm's two managerial stints in the 1930s and 1940s, plus a brief appearance as manager in 1960, Grimm accumulated 946 career wins, second-most in franchise history behind Anson.

Owner P. K. Wrigley then began experimenting with the managerial position and in December 1960, announced that Cubs would not have only one manager for the coming season. Instead, the team implemented a new managerial system known as the "College of Coaches." The system was meant to blend ideas from several individuals instead of relying on one manager. During its first year, the team rotated four managers into the role: Vedie Himsl, Harry Craft, El Tappe and Lou Klein. The next year, under the guidance of Tappe, Klein and Charlie Metro, the Cubs lost a franchise-record 103 games. Bob Kennedy managed the team for the next three seasons until Hall of Famer Leo Durocher assumed the managerial role for the 1966 season, effectively ending the five-year-long "College of Coaches" experiment. During his first season as manager, Durocher's Cubs tied the franchise's 103-game loss record set four years earlier by the "College;" however, he maintained a winning record for the rest of his seven-year tenure.

In the 42 seasons after Durocher, the Cubs employed 25 managers. Jim Frey and Don Zimmer led the team to the National League Championship Series (NLCS) in 1984 and 1989, respectively. In both of those seasons, the team's manager won a Manager of the Year Award. Jim Riggleman managed the team for five years from 1995 through 1999, earning the team's first wild card playoff spot in 1998. Dusty Baker's Cubs lost in the 2003 NLCS during the first year of a four-year managing tenure. Baker's successor, Lou Piniella, led the team to two consecutive National League Central titles during his first two years with the team and won the 2008 Manager of the Year Award. During the 2010 season, Piniella announced his intention to retire as manager at the end of the year. He instead resigned after a game in August, however, citing family reasons. Third base coach Mike Quade finished the remainder of the season as manager.

When manager Joe Maddon became a free agent near the end of 2014, the Cubs fired Rick Renteria after only one season to bring Maddon on to lead the club. He was signed to a five-year, $25 million contract. From 2015 through 2019, Maddon led the team to the playoffs four times. He was awarded the 2015 Manager of the Year Award and went on to help the club break its 108-year World Series drought in 2016. Epstein and Maddon announced in a joint press conference in September 2019 that the Cubs would let Maddon's initial five-year contract expire. The team brought on former Cubs catcher David Ross to replace Maddon, signing him to a three-year contract. Though the Cubs gave Ross a contract extension in 2022, the team hired outgoing Milwaukee Brewers manager Craig Counsell after the 2023 season and dismissed Ross.

== Table key ==
#	A running total of the number of Cubs managers. Any manager who has two or more separate terms is only counted once.
GM	Number of regular season games managed; may not equal sum of wins and losses due to tie games
W	Number of regular season wins in games managed
L	Number of regular season losses in games managed
Win%	Winning percentage: number of wins divided by number of games managed
PA	Playoff appearances: number of years this manager has led the franchise to the playoffs
PW	Playoff wins: number of wins this manager has accrued in the playoffs
PL	Playoff losses: number of losses this manager has accrued in the playoffs
PT	Playoff ties: number of ties this manager has accrued in the playoffs
LC	League championships: number of League championships, or pennants, achieved by the manager
WS	World Series: number of World Series victories achieved by the manager
*	Manager acted as interim manager
§	Belonged to the "College of Coaches"
[x]	Awarded the Manager of the Year Award during tenure with the Cubs
† or ‡	Elected to the National Baseball Hall of Fame (‡ denotes induction as manager or executive)

== Managers ==
Statistics current through the end of the 2024 season

#	Image	Manager	Seasons	GM	W	L	Win%	PA	PW	PL	PT	LC	WS	Ref
1		Albert Spalding^{‡}	1876–1877	126	78	47	.624	—	—	—	—	1	—	
2		Bob Ferguson	1878	61	30	30	.500	—	—	—	—	—	—	
3		Cap Anson^{†}	1879	64	41	21	.661	—	—	—	—	—	—	
4		Silver Flint	1879	19	5	12	.294	—	—	—	—	—	—	
—		Cap Anson^{†}	1880–1897	2194	1242	911	.577	—	—	—	—	5	—	
5		Tom Burns	1898–1899	304	160	138	.537	—	—	—	—	—	—	
6		Tom Loftus	1900–1901	286	118	161	.423	—	—	—	—	—	—	
7		Frank Selee^{‡}	1902–1905	503	280	213	.568	—	—	—	—	—	—	
8		Frank Chance^{†}	1905–1912	1178	768	389	.664	4	11	9	1	4	2	
9		Johnny Evers^{†}	1913	155	88	65	.575	—	—	—	—	—	—	
10		Hank O'Day	1914	156	78	76	.506	—	—	—	—	—	—	
11		Roger Bresnahan^{†}	1915	157	73	80	.477	—	—	—	—	—	—	
12		Joe Tinker^{†}	1916	156	67	86	.438	—	—	—	—	—	—	
13		Fred Mitchell	1917–1920	582	308	269	.534	1	2	4	0	1	0	
—		Johnny Evers^{†}	1921	96	41	55	.427	—	—	—	—	—	—	
14		Bill Killefer	1921–1925	596	300	293	.506	—	—	—	—	—	—	
15		Rabbit Maranville^{†}	1925	53	23	30	.434	—	—	—	—	—	—	
16		George Gibson	1925	26	12	14	.462	—	—	—	—	—	—	
17		Joe McCarthy^{‡}	1926–1930	770	442	321	.579	1	5	1	0	1	0	
18		Rogers Hornsby^{†}	1930–1932	259	141	116	.549	—	—	—	—	—	—	
19		Charlie Grimm	1932–1938	904	534	369	.591	2	5	12	0	2	0	
20		Gabby Hartnett^{†}	1938–1940	383	203	176	.536	1	0	4	0	1	0	
21		Jimmie Wilson	1941–1944	474	213	258	.452	—	—	—	—	—	—	
22		Roy Johnson*	1944	1	0	1	.000	—	—	—	—	—	—	
—		Charlie Grimm	1944–1949	816	406	402	.502	1	3	4	0	1	0	
23		Frankie Frisch^{†}	1949–1951	339	141	196	.418	—	—	—	—	—	—	
24		Phil Cavarretta	1951–1953	384	169	213	.442	—	—	—	—	—	—	
25		Stan Hack	1954–1956	465	196	265	.425	—	—	—	—	—	—	
26		Bob Scheffing	1957–1959	465	208	254	.450	—	—	—	—	—	—	
—		Charlie Grimm	1960	17	6	11	.353	—	—	—	—	—	—	
27		Lou Boudreau^{†}	1960	139	54	83	.394	—	—	—	—	—	—	
28		Vedie Himsl^{§}	1961	11	5	6	.455	—	—	—	—	—	—	
29		Harry Craft^{§}	1961	12	4	8	.333	—	—	—	—	—	—	
—		Vedie Himsl^{§}	1961	17	5	12	.294	—	—	—	—	—	—	
30		El Tappe^{§}	1961	2	2	0	1.000	—	—	—	—	—	—	
—		Harry Craft^{§}	1961	4	3	1	.750	—	—	—	—	—	—	
—		Vedie Himsl^{§}	1961	4	0	3	.000	—	—	—	—	—	—	
—		El Tappe^{§}	1961	79	35	43	.449	—	—	—	—	—	—	
31		Lou Klein^{§}	1961	11	5	6	.455	—	—	—	—	—	—	
—		El Tappe^{§}	1961–1962	36	9	27	.250	—	—	—	—	—	—	
—		Lou Klein^{§}	1962	30	12	18	.400	—	—	—	—	—	—	
32		Charlie Metro^{§}	1962	112	43	69	.384	—	—	—	—	—	—	
33		Bob Kennedy^{§}	1963–1965	382	182	198	.479	—	—	—	—	—	—	
—		Lou Klein^{§}	1965	106	48	58	.453	—	—	—	—	—	—	
34		Leo Durocher^{‡}	1966–1972	1065	535	526	.504	—	—	—	—	—	—	
35		Whitey Lockman	1972–1974	319	157	162	.492	—	—	—	—	—	—	
36		Jim Marshall	1974–1976	393	175	218	.445	—	—	—	—	—	—	
37		Herman Franks	1977–1979	479	238	241	.497	—	—	—	—	—	—	
38		Joey Amalfitano*	1979	7	2	5	.286	—	—	—	—	—	—	
39		Preston Gómez	1980	90	38	52	.422	—	—	—	—	—	—	
—		Joey Amalfitano	1980–1981	178	64	111	.366	—	—	—	—	—	—	
40		Lee Elia	1982–1983	285	127	158	.446	—	—	—	—	—	—	
41		Charlie Fox*	1983	39	17	22	.436	—	—	—	—	—	—	
42		Jim Frey^{[b]}	1984–1986	379	196	182	.519	1	2	3	0	0	—	
43		John Vukovich*	1986	2	1	1	.500	—	—	—	—	—	—	
44		Gene Michael	1986–1987	238	114	124	.479	—	—	—	—	—	—	
45		Frank Lucchesi*	1987	25	8	17	.320	—	—	—	—	—	—	
46		Don Zimmer^{[c]}	1988–1991	524	265	258	.507	1	1	4	0	0	—	
47		Joe Altobelli*	1991	1	0	1	.000	—	—	—	—	—	—	
48		Jim Essian	1991	122	59	63	.484	—	—	—	—	—	—	
49		Jim Lefebvre	1992–1993	324	162	162	.500	—	—	—	—	—	—	
50		Tom Trebelhorn	1994	113	49	64	.434	—	—	—	—	—	—	
51		Jim Riggleman	1995–1999	794	374	419	.472	1	0	3	0	0	—	
52		Don Baylor	2000–2002	407	187	220	.459	—	—	—	—	—	—	
53		Rene Lachemann*	2002	1	0	1	.000	—	—	—	—	—	—	
54		Bruce Kimm*	2002	78	33	45	.423	—	—	—	—	—	—	
55		Dusty Baker	2003–2006	648	322	326	.497	1	6	6	0	0	—	
56		Lou Piniella^{[d]}	2007–2010	609	316	293	.519	2	0	6	0	0	—	
57		Mike Quade	2010–2011	199	95	104	.477	—	—	—	—	—	—	
58		Dale Sveum	2012–2013	324	127	197	.392	—	—	—	—	—	—	
59		Rick Renteria	2014	162	73	89	.451	—	—	—	—	—	—	
60		Joe Maddon^{[e]}	2015–2019	810	471	339	.581	4	19	18	0	1	1	
61		David Ross	2020–2023	546	262	284	.480	1	0	2	0	0	—	
62		Craig Counsell	2024–present	486	264	222	.543	2	4	6	—	—	—	

== See also ==
- List of Chicago Cubs owners and executives

== Notes ==
- ^{a} The 19th-century World Series was a different event from the current World Series, which was first played in 1903. The 19th-century World Series was considered an exhibition contest between the champion of the National League and the champion of the American Association.
- ^{b} Jim Frey won the Manager of the Year Award for the 1984 season.
- ^{c} Don Zimmer won the Manager of the Year Award for the 1989 season.
- ^{d} Lou Piniella won the Manager of the Year Award for the 2008 season.
- ^{e} Joe Maddon won the Manager of the Year Award for the 2015 season.
