= Dick Pole =

American baseball player (born 1950)

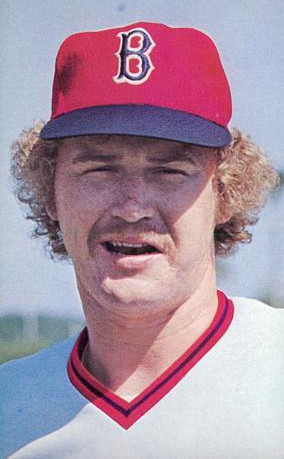
- Pole with the Red Sox in 1976
- Pitcher
- Born: October 13, 1950 (age 75); Trout Creek, Michigan, U.S.
- Batted: Right Threw: Right

MLB debut
- August 3, 1973, for the Boston Red Sox

Last MLB appearance
- July 18, 1978, for the Seattle Mariners

MLB statistics
- Win–loss record: 25–37
- Earned run average: 5.05
- Strikeouts: 239
- Stats at Baseball Reference

Teams
- As player: Boston Red Sox (1973–1976); Seattle Mariners (1977–1978); As coach: Chicago Cubs (1988–1991); San Francisco Giants (1993–1997); Boston Red Sox (1998); Anaheim Angels (1999); Cleveland Indians (2000–2001); Montreal Expos (2002); Chicago Cubs (2003–2006); Cincinnati Reds (2007–2009)

Richard Henry Pole (born October 13, 1950) is an American former professional baseball player and a former pitching coach. A right-handed pitcher, Pole was 6 ft 3 in (1.91 m) tall and weighed 210 pounds (95 kg) during his playing career.

== Playing career ==
Pole was born in Trout Creek, Michigan and attended Ewen-Trout Creek High School then Northern Michigan University and signed with the Boston Red Sox as an amateur free agent. He quickly developed into a top pitching prospect. With Class AAA Pawtucket in 1973, his 2.03 earned run average and 158 strikeouts led the International League. That same year, he pitched a no-hitter against Peninsula.

Pole made his Major League debut on August 3, 1973, starting the second game of a doubleheader against the Baltimore Orioles. He surrendered six runs in 3 2/3 innings pitched and received the loss, as the Orioles won 8–2. He remained with the team, and spent the next four seasons moving between the rotation and the bullpen for the Red Sox.

Pole's career was nearly ended by an injury during a game against the Orioles on June 30, 1975, when a line drive by Tony Muser struck him in the face. The ball had been hit so hard that it bounced into foul territory near third base, scoring two runs on the play. Pole sustained a broken jaw and damage to the retina of his right eye. The damaged eye never fully recovered, and he ultimately lost ninety percent of the vision in that eye. Pole recovered from his injuries in time to pitch in the 1975 World Series, walking the only two batters he faced in a 6–2 loss to the Cincinnati Reds in Game 5. The Red Sox ultimately lost the series in seven games.

At the end of the 1976 season, Pole became one of the inaugural members of the Seattle Mariners franchise, as they selected him from the Red Sox with the seventh pick in the 1976 MLB expansion draft. Pole spent 1977 and 1978 with the Mariners, but his performance was not up to the standard he had set in Boston, possibly due to effects from the injury. His most memorable moment with Seattle came on August 5, 1977, when he surrendered Reggie Jackson's 300th career home run. On March 24, 1979, the Mariners released him.

Pole ended his time in the majors with 25 wins, 37 losses, one save, and a 5.05 ERA in 122 games pitched and 531 innings. His one save came on September 28, 1974. He pitched 4 innings to preserve a 7-2 Red Sox win over the Tigers. He saved the game for Red Sox Hall of Famer Luis Tiant. After the end of his Major League career, he continued to play professionally in Mexico.

== Coaching career ==
Pole began his coaching career in the Chicago Cubs' minor league system in 1983, and joined their Major League coaching staff in 1988, working as pitching coach for Don Zimmer. Pole remained in that capacity through 1991, during which time he oversaw the development of Greg Maddux.

Maddux credits Pole as a major influence, and a significant contributor to his success. In a 2005 interview, he said, "I remember when Dick Pole told me one day, 'Why don't you stop trying to strike guys out? Just try to get them out, and you'll probably strike out just as many guys, if not more. He was right. I've always tried with two strikes just to make a pitch and get the guy out. You get a lot of strikeouts just on accident."

Pole returned to his roots as pitching coach for the Pawtucket Red Sox in 1992, then spent 1993 to 1997 on the coaching staff of the San Francisco Giants, under Dusty Baker. Pole next worked as bullpen coach for Boston in 1998. After that, he was pitching coach for the Anaheim Angels in 1999, for the Cleveland Indians from 2000 to 2001, and for the Montreal Expos in 2002. He re-joined the Cubs' staff in 2003. He was most recently the pitching coach for the Cincinnati Reds, taking the job in early November 2006. On October 2, 2009, the Reds relieved him of his duties.

== Personal life ==
Pole's nephew, Hank Pole pitched professionally in the Montreal Expos' system in 2002.

| Preceded by Herm Starrette | Chicago Cubs pitching coach 1988–1991 | Succeeded by Billy Connors |
| Preceded by Carlos Alfonso | San Francisco Giants pitching coach 1993–1997 | Succeeded by Ron Perranoski |
| Preceded by Herm Starrette | Boston Red Sox bullpen coach 1998 | Succeeded by John Cumberland |
| Preceded by Marcel Lachemann | Anaheim Angels pitching coach 1999 | Succeeded by Bud Black |
| Preceded by Phil Regan | Cleveland Indians pitching coach 2000–2001 | Succeeded by Mike Brown |
| Preceded by Brad Arnsberg | Montreal Expos pitching coach 2002 | Succeeded by Randy St. Claire |
| Preceded by Rene Lachemann | Chicago Cubs bench coach 2003–2006 | Succeeded by Alan Trammell |
| Preceded by Vern Ruhle | Cincinnati Reds pitching coach 2007–2009 | Succeeded by Bryan Price |
