= John Holland (baseball executive) =

American baseball executive

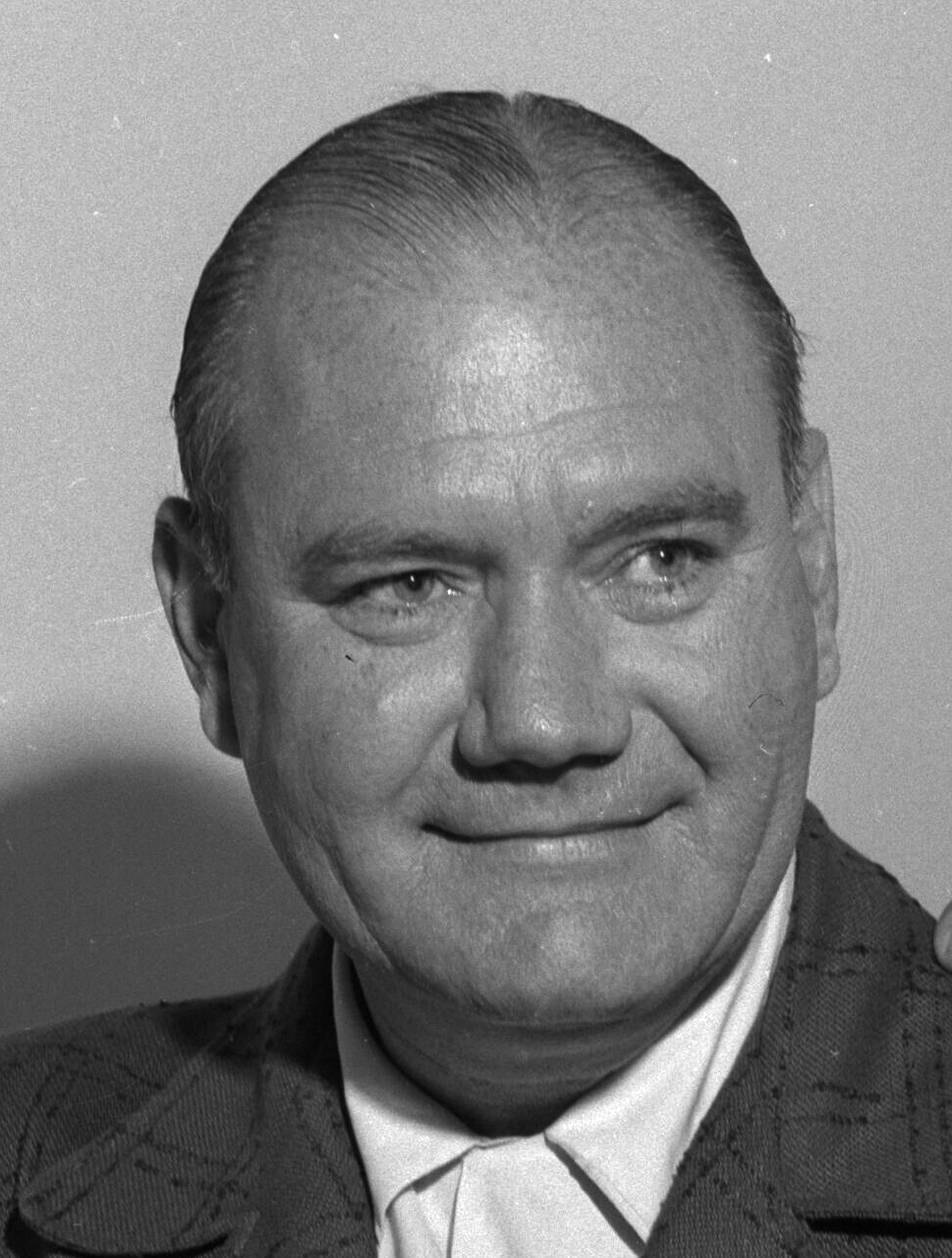
- John Holland, 1956
- Born: February 18, 1910; Wichita, Kansas, U.S.
- Died: July 15, 1979 (aged 69); Chicago, Illinois, U.S.
- Occupation(s): Professional baseball player and executive
- Years active: 1930–1975

John Davison Holland Jr. (February 18, 1910 – July 15, 1979) was an American baseball executive who served as general manager of the Chicago Cubs of Major League Baseball from 1956 to 1975.

== Early career ==
The Wichita, Kansas, native was a former minor league catcher who had toiled as an executive in the Cub farm system for the Visalia Cubs of the California League, Des Moines Bruins of the Western League, and Los Angeles Angels of the Pacific Coast League — then the Cubs' top farm team.

== GM during 'College of Coaches' era ==
Holland was promoted from the PCL Angels to succeed Wid Matthews as general manager of the Cubs after the end of the 1956 season. He brought with him Bob Scheffing as the Cubs' new manager. Scheffing, a former Cub catcher and coach, had won the PCL pennant with the Angels on the strength of 107 victories in 1956. But the Cubs were in the midst of a two-decade-long tenancy in the second division of the National League.

After Scheffing and his successors, Charlie Grimm and Lou Boudreau, could not rouse the club from its doldrums, owner Philip K. Wrigley decided on a radical departure after the 1960 season: the Cubs became the only team in the history of Major League Baseball to dispense with the position of field manager. Wrigley's College of Coaches employed a series of rotating (and then more permanent) "head coaches" from 1961 to 1965. In 1963, the experiment seemed to hold promise, as head coach Bob Kennedy led the team to an 82–80 finish, the Cubs' first winning record since 1946. But they reverted to losing seasons in 1964–65, and the College of Coaches experiment was abandoned at the end of the 1965 season, when Leo Durocher was hired to manage the Cubs.

Holland made perhaps the most notorious trade in Cubs' history during the same period. He traded talented young outfielder Lou Brock to the St. Louis Cardinals for righthanded pitcher Ernie Broglio in June 1964. Brock came into his own that season, helping the Cardinals to a World Series triumph, going on to be part of two more pennant winners and one more World Series winner before his Hall of Fame career ended. Broglio, an 18-game-winner in 1963, turned out to have elbow problems that would require off-season surgery in 1964 and ended his major league career within two years.

== Built contending late-1960s team ==
The team of Durocher and Holland floundered in 1966, when the Cubbies finished dead last in the National League. But beginning in 1967, the Cubs jumped into contention in the NL with a series of first division ballclubs and six straight above .500 campaigns, led by four Baseball Hall of Famers — Billy Williams, Ferguson Jenkins, Ernie Banks and Ron Santo — and featuring other stars like Glenn Beckert, Don Kessinger and Randy Hundley. Banks was already a mainstay with the Cubs by 1956, but Holland's scouts (including the legendary Buck O'Neil) had signed and developed Williams, Santo and Kessinger, and Holland acquired Jenkins, Hundley and Beckert through trades and the Rule 5 draft.

The 1969 Cubs broke from the gate quickly and appeared headed for the National League East Division championship but were overtaken by the "Miracle" New York Mets. That team, which finished at 92–70 and eight games out of the division lead, proved to be the most successful outfit of the Holland era, as the Cubs gradually sank back in the NL East standings, reverting to their losing ways in 1973. Holland retired two seasons later and was replaced by E. R. "Salty" Saltwell, the Cubs' treasurer.

John Holland died in Chicago at the age of 69.

Preceded by Wid Matthews	Chicago Cubs General Manager; 1956–1975	Succeeded by E. R. "Salty" Saltwell
