= Salty Saltwell =

Baseball executive (1924–2020)

Saltwell

Eldred R. "Salty" Saltwell (April 14, 1924 – May 3, 2020) was the general manager of the Chicago Cubs of Major League Baseball in 1976. He was appointed to the position on September 30. 1975 and replaced by Bob Kennedy on November 24, 1976.

Saltwell was born and raised in Sioux City, Iowa, where he attended East High School and Morningside College. His higher education was interrupted by a three-year stint in the U.S. Army, much of it spent in the European and Pacific Theaters. After returning stateside, he eventually received his degree from Morningside in 1949, where he also spent three years as the sports publicity director, after he'd helped start the school’s sports public relations department. From 1947-54, Saltwell also worked as an usher, trainer, play-by-play announcer, traveling secretary and business manager for the Sioux City Soos of the Class-A Western League.

Like a predecessor, John Holland, Saltwell had been a general manager in the minor leagues. He was the GM with minor league affiliates in Des Moines, Iowa, and Los Angeles. Saltwell came to Chicago in 1958 as a business manager by owner Philip K. Wrigley. He was made a vice president in 1972. The Chicago Tribune openly mocked the move and called Saltwell a hot dog vendor. Wrigley defended the decision by stating that Saltwell had the capacity to get rough, especially in contract negotiations. The team would go 75–87 in 1976 with Saltwell as GM. On November 24, 1976, he was reassigned from being the GM, as he was named secretary and director of park operations while field manager Jim Marshall was fired.

== Transactions ==
Saltwell was criticized for a number of transactions. His first transaction was on October 28, 1975, when he traded shortstop Don Kessinger to the St. Louis Cardinals for pitcher Mike Garman. Kessinger was the last player remaining from the 1969 Cubs team.

A challenge for Saltwell was that the fall of 1975 ushered in the era of free agency. Pitchers Andy Messersmith and Dave McNally successfully challenged a portion of the MLB Reserve clause.

Saltwell also traded Andre Thornton to the Montreal Expos. In the spring of 1976, Thornton complained about the Cubs' spring training facilities, and feuded with José Cardenal. He was labelled as a troublemaker. On May 17, Saltwell made a deal with the Expos, which was also highly criticized by fans and media alike. In the draft, Saltwell did not have any better luck. Under Saltwell, the Cubs selected pitcher Herman Segelke in the first round of the June draft.

In September 1976, Saltwell was confronted by pitcher Steve Stone. Stone had informed Saltwell of his impending free agency and attempted to get a contract. Saltwell responded by telling Stone that Mr. Wrigley was in the middle of a divorce and he would have to get back to him. Stone opted to leave the Cubs.

One of the most criticized trades was made on February 11, 1977, when the Cubs traded third baseman Bill Madlock and infielder Rob Sperring to the San Francisco Giants for outfielder Bobby Murcer, third baseman Steve Ontiveros and pitcher Andy Muhlstock. Madlock was a two-time defending batting champion who had hit .354 and .339 over the previous two seasons. Saltwell wanted more power and acquired Murcer. After smashing 27 home runs in 1977 with the Cubs, Murcer hit just nine in 1978 and was traded to his original team, the New York Yankees.

== Personal ==
Saltwell married Betty Cairy, also a Morningside College graduate in February 1955. They had two children and were married until her death on January 10, 2019.

== Death ==
Salty Saltwell died on May 3, 2020, at the age of 96.

== Executive career ==
Year	Team	Title	Function
1976	Chicago Cubs	Vice President / General Manager (Hired 9/30/75; Reassigned 11/24/76)	General Manager
1984	Chicago Cubs	Special Assistant Executive V.P. and V.P., Business Operations	Special Assistant to the GM
1985	Chicago Cubs	Special Assistant Executive V.P. and V.P., Business Operations	Special Assistant to the GM
1986	Chicago Cubs	Vice President	Special Assistant to the GM

Preceded by Whitey Lockman	Chicago Cubs General Manager; 1976	Succeeded by Bob Kennedy
