= Major League Baseball Scouting Bureau =

The Major League Baseball Scouting Bureau is a centralized scouting resource that operates under the auspices of the Office of the Commissioner of Baseball. Headquartered in Ontario, California, the MLBSB's efforts supplement the independent, proprietary amateur and professional scouting operations of the 30 Major League Baseball clubs. In 2012, the MLBSB employed 34 full-time and 13 part-time scouts in the United States, Canada and Puerto Rico. In 2010, it announced plans to expand its activities beyond Puerto Rico to other countries in Latin America.

According to MLB.com, the MLBSB's scouts "provide information on amateur prospects as a part of its mission to support the efforts of MLB clubs in the First-Year Player Draft. The MLBSB also provides professional scouting services, including the collection of video footage of players throughout the professional ranks, both domestically and internationally." It maintains an eligibility file on amateur players — many of them teenagers — and holds 35 tryout camps each June in its countries of operation.

The current MLBSB was founded in 1974 by outgoing Milwaukee Brewers general manager Jim Wilson, and became part of the commissioner's office in 1985. However, its roots date to the founding by Major League owners of the Central Scouting Bureau in 1968, a period of time when many big league clubs were downsizing their scouting departments. The CSB's first director was Jim Fanning, former farm and scouting director of the Atlanta Braves. In August 1968, Fanning resigned after seven months with the CSB to become general manager of the expansion Montreal Expos. He was succeeded by former Chicago Cubs "head coach" Vedie Himsl for two years. Then, the CSB was temporarily dormant for almost four years until it was revived, as the MLBSB, by Wilson.

From 1998–2014, the MLBSB was supervised by director, and then senior director, Frank Marcos. He announced his departure from the bureau in October 2014. He was succeeded by former Major League executive Bill Bavasi.
