= Enloe, Texas =

- Unincorporated community
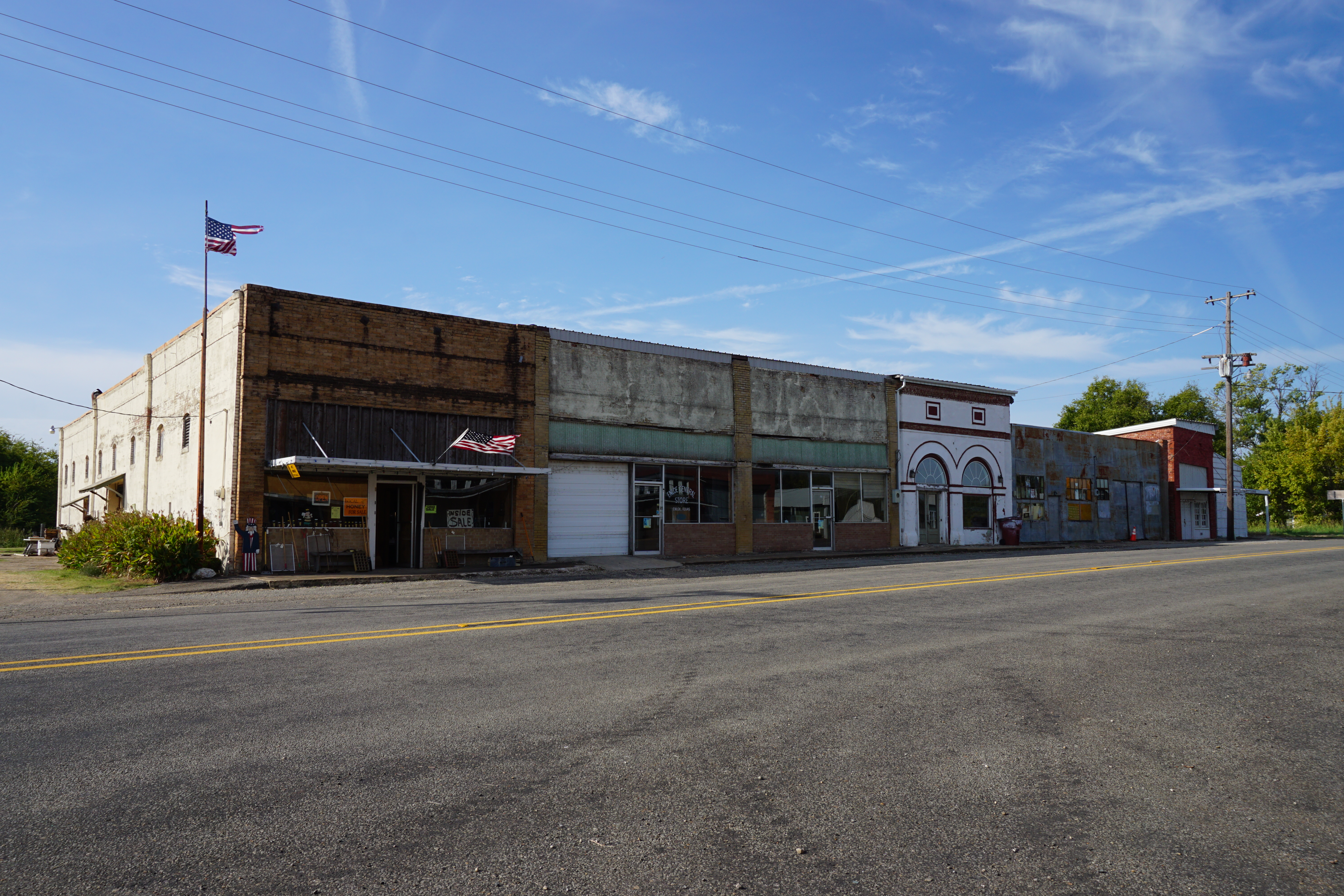
- Farm to Market Road 198 in Enloe

- Location within Texas Location within the United States
- Coordinates: 33°25′58″N 95°39′27″W
- Country: United States
- State: Texas
- County: Delta
- Elevation: 495 ft (151 m)
- Time zone: UTC-6 (Central (CST))
  - Summer (DST): UTC-5 (CDT)
- Postal code: 75441
- Area codes: 903 & 430
- GNIS feature ID: 1357032

Enloe is an unincorporated community in Delta County, Texas, United States. According to the Handbook of Texas, the community had a population of 113 in 2000.

== History ==
The region was first settled in 1888 and incorporated in 1897 upon the construction of a railway stop. 113 people were living there as of 1990 and 2000. It went up to 125 in 2010.

On June 2, 1954, a large, 1,000 yd-wide (910 m) F2 tornado killed one and injured eight in Enloe. On January 10, 2020, an EF0 tornado struck Enloe. A couple of small outbuildings were destroyed with debris scattered a few hundred yards downwind in a subtle cyclonic pattern.

Today, there are two museums in Enloe; the Patterson Museum and the Clara Foster Slough Museum.

== Geography ==
Enloe is located at the intersection of Farm to Market Roads 2949 and 198, 3 mi (4.8 km) north of Cooper in north-central Delta County. It also borders a nearby stream, Brushy Creek, to the southwest.

== Notable people ==
- Lester Bangs, music journalist and critic. His father is from Enloe.
- Goldie Holt, professional baseball player, scout, coach and manager.

== Gallery ==
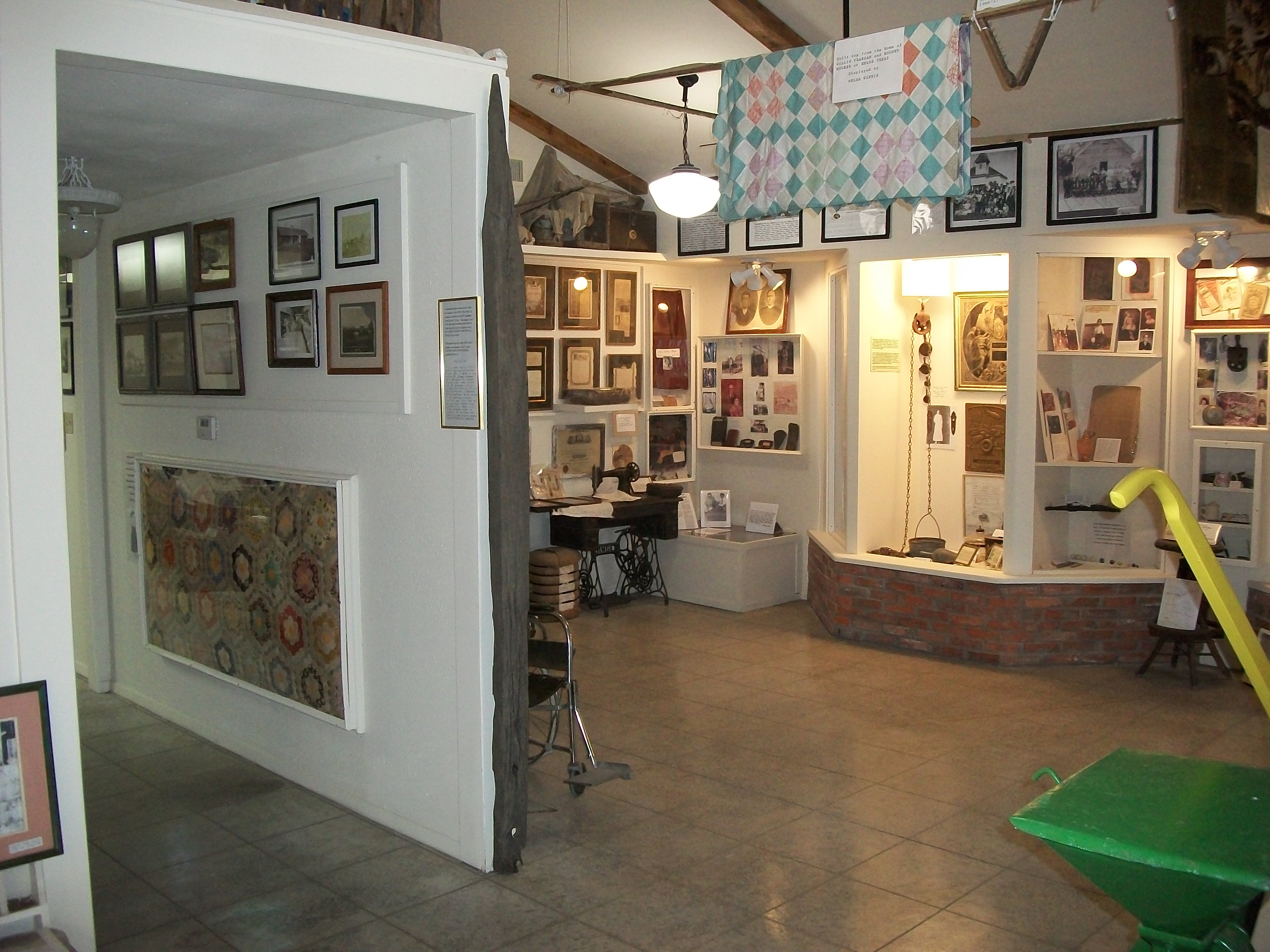
Clara Foster Slough Museum
