= Lou Klein =

American baseball player (1918–1976)

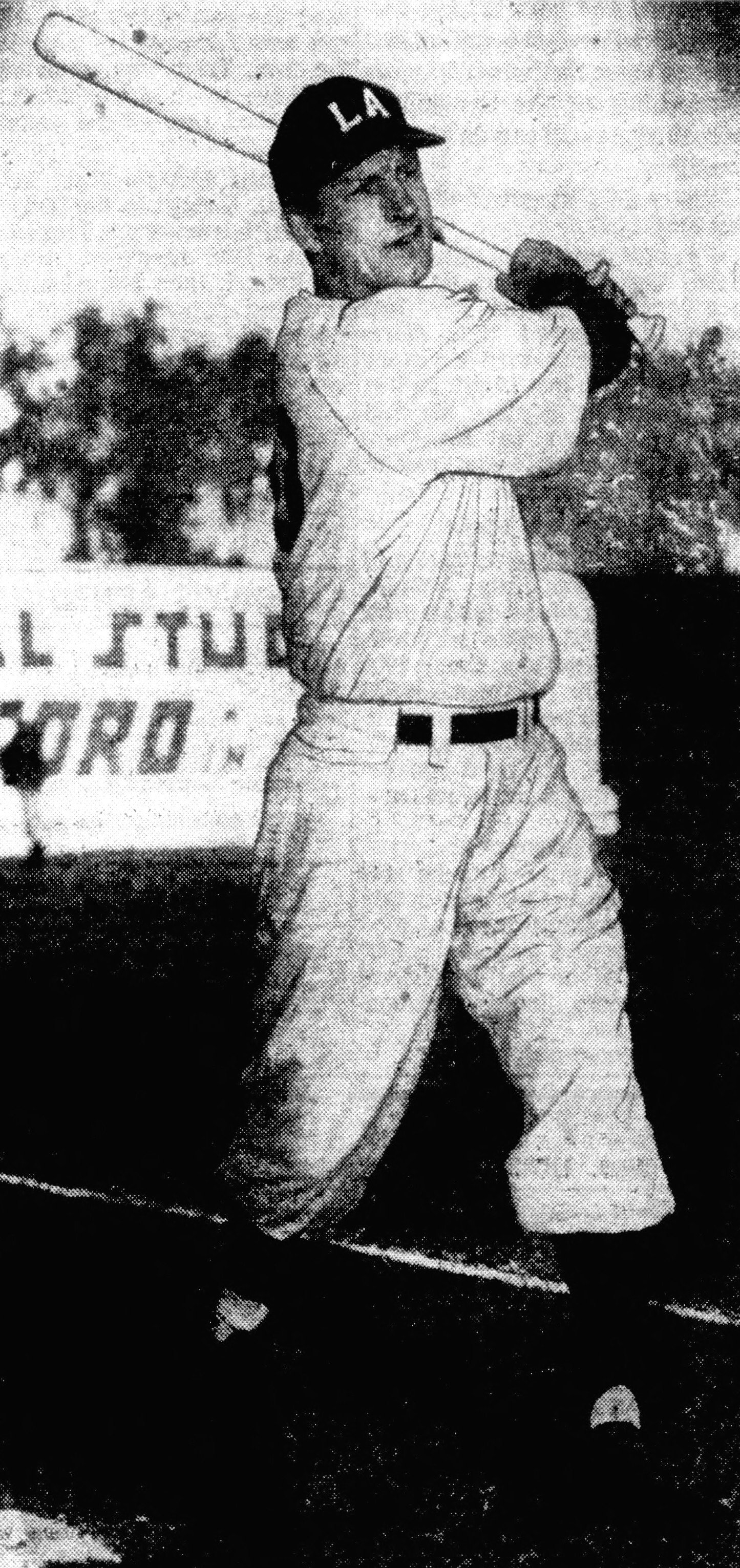
- Klein, circa 1950
- Second baseman / Shortstop / Manager
- Born: October 22, 1918; New Orleans, Louisiana, U.S.
- Died: June 20, 1976 (aged 57); Metairie, Louisiana, U.S.
- Batted: Right Threw: Right

MLB debut
- April 21, 1943, for the St. Louis Cardinals

Last MLB appearance
- September 30, 1951, for the Philadelphia Athletics

MLB statistics
- Batting average: .259
- Home runs: 16
- Runs batted in: 101
- Managerial record: 65–82
- Winning %: .442
- Stats at Baseball Reference

Teams
- As player: St. Louis Cardinals (1943, 1945–1946, 1949); Cleveland Indians (1951); Philadelphia Athletics (1951); As manager: Chicago Cubs (1961, 1962, 1965)

Career highlights and awards
- National League champion (1943)

Louis Frank Klein (October 22, 1918 – June 20, 1976) was an American professional baseball player, manager, coach and scout. During his active career he was an infielder in the Major Leagues for the St. Louis Cardinals, Cleveland Indians and Philadelphia Athletics, and was known as one of the players who "jumped" to the Mexican League in 1946. He was then suspended by Commissioner of Baseball Happy Chandler for a five-year span, although the suspension was later reduced.

Born in New Orleans, Klein attended Peters High School in that city. As a player, he was listed as 5 feet 11 inches (1.80 m) tall and 167 pounds (76 kg) and threw and batted right-handed.

== Playing career ==
Klein's professional career began as a shortstop at age 21 in the Cardinals' farm system. He rose from Class D, the lowest level, in 1940 all the way to the top-level Columbus Red Birds in 1941, and needed only three years of minor league seasoning to reach the big leagues.

In his rookie season in the Majors, with the reigning world champion 1943 Cardinals, Klein was a strong contributor to the Redbirds' successful defence of the National League pennant. He appeared in 154 of the club's 157 official games, started 32 games at shortstop, and then succeeded Jimmy Brown as St. Louis' regular second baseman (119 starts) when Brown entered World War II military service. Klein hit a career-high .287 and was second on the Cardinals in hits (180), runs scored (91) and triples (14)—behind only Stan Musial, an eventual Baseball Hall of Famer. During the 1943 World Series against the New York Yankees, he started all five games at second base but he collected only three hits, all singles, in 22 at bats and the Cardinals fell to the Yankees, four games to one. Klein then joined the United States Coast Guard, serving in Maryland and Florida, and missed all of 1944 and most of the 1945 season.

When he returned to the Cardinals in September 1945, he battled for playing time on a talent-loaded team. Klein believed his future role in St. Louis would be limited as a utility player backing up the younger Red Schoendienst (a future Hall of Famer himself). Only two months into the 1946 season, with the Cardinals in the first place, he jumped to the Mexican League, along with teammates Max Lanier and Fred Martin.

Throughout the spring of 1946, the Pasquel brothers of the Mexican League had been making enticing offers to many low-paid Major Leaguers perpetually bound to their teams by the reserve clause. The trio of Cardinals was the latest group to accept. In an attempt to slow this exodus, Chandler banned all players who broke their existing contracts to join the Mexican League, including Klein, from Organized Baseball for a span of five years. On June 5, 1949, Chandler lifted the bans on the Mexican League jumpers, and eleven days later, Klein returned to the Cardinals. The Sporting News reported that he paid $1,500 out of his own pocket to buy his release from his independent club in the Quebec Provincial League to rejoin Organized Baseball.

== Coach and manager ==
Klein's suspension-interrupted postwar MLB playing career was a far cry from his 1943 success. In 100 games for the Cardinals (1945–46; 1949), and 51 more with the Indians and Athletics (1951), he collected only 89 hits in 410 at bats (.217) and played full years in the minor leagues in 1950 and 1952–53. Altogether he batted .259 in 305 MLB games, his 269 hits including 45 doubles, 15 triples (only one after 1943) and 16 home runs. He had 101 runs batted in.

Klein became a manager in the farm system of the Chicago Cubs in 1955. In 1960, he began the season as a coach for the MLB Cubs for half a season before swapping jobs with San Antonio Missions' manager Grady Hatton in midyear.

Then, in 1961, he was named to the infamous College of Coaches—a brainchild of owner Philip K. Wrigley, who decided to abolish the position of field manager and instead rotate "head coaches" to run the Cubs and their minor league affiliates. Klein was in charge of the Cubs for 11 games between September 1–10, 1961, and compiled a 5–6 win–loss record as head coach. He'd actually helmed clubs as low as Class D (the equivalent of a Rookie-level team today) during the season.

In 1962, Klein was named head coach again, replacing El Tappe and managing 30 games between May 1 and June 3 (posting a 12–18 record). The 1962 Cubs finished 59–103 — their first time ever with a 100-loss season, and still the worst in franchise history. Only the 40–120 New York Mets were worse. In 1965, Klein was named to a third stint as head coach, replacing Bob Kennedy on June 14 and staying on through the rest of the season. The last head coach in the history of the College of Coaches, Klein went 48–58 in 1965, and finished with a lifetime 65–82 (.442) record. He remained in the Cub organization as a scout.

Klein died in Metairie, Louisiana, at age 57 after suffering a stroke.

== See also ==
- College of Coaches

Sporting positions
Preceded by El Tappe; El Tappe; Bob Kennedy	Chicago Cubs head coach September 1–10, 1961; May 1–June 3, 1962; June 14–October 3, 1965	Succeeded by El Tappe; Charlie Metro; Leo Durocher (1966 manager)
