= Fred Martin (baseball) =

American baseball player, coach, manager, and scout (1915–1979)

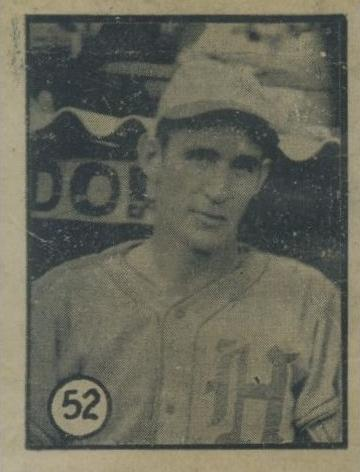
- Pitcher
- Born: June 27, 1915; LeFlore County, Oklahoma, U.S.
- Died: June 11, 1979 (aged 63); Chicago, Illinois, U.S.
- Batted: Right Threw: Right

MLB debut
- April 21, 1946, for the St. Louis Cardinals

Last MLB appearance
- September 24, 1950, for the St. Louis Cardinals

MLB statistics
- Win–loss record: 12–3
- Earned run average: 3.78
- Innings pitched: 162
- Stats at Baseball Reference

Teams
- St. Louis Cardinals (1946, 1949–1950)

Fred Turner Martin (June 27, 1915 – June 11, 1979) was an American professional baseball pitcher, coach, manager and scout. Born in Williams, Oklahoma, Martin threw and batted right-handed, stood 6 feet 1 inch (185 cm) tall and weighed 185 pounds (84 kg) during his active playing career.

== Career ==
=== Defected to Mexican League ===
Martin was one of a handful Major League Baseball players who "jumped" to the then-outlaw Mexican League during the 1946 season. With the reserve clause binding players permanently to the U.S. teams in "Organized Baseball" who held their contracts, the insurgent Mexican League induced players such as Martin, Sal Maglie, Mickey Owen, Lou Klein, Max Lanier, Danny Gardella and others to leave their clubs — in Martin's (and Lanier's and Klein's) case, the pennant-contending but notoriously low-paying St. Louis Cardinals — for greater riches south of the border.

Martin, then almost 31, was in his first MLB campaign after seven years of toiling in the minors and four years of World War II service in the United States Army. He had appeared in six games for the 1946, title-bound Cards, winning two of three decisions and compiling an earned run average of 4.08 in 28 2/3 innings pitched. He, along with the other "contract jumpers," was then suspended by Commissioner of Baseball Albert B. Chandler. While the Mexican League raids of MLB stopped, and most of the American players soon attempted to rejoin Organized Baseball, the bans remained in force.

In 1949, Martin and Lanier filed a $2.5 million lawsuit against baseball in an attempt to have the five-year bans lifted. The case, "Martin et al. v. National League Baseball Club", was appealed to the U.S. Court of Appeals for the Second Circuit, and heard by its Chief Judge Learned Hand. As part of the lawsuit, Martin and Lanier had requested a preliminary injunction allowing the "jumpers" to immediately return to their former major league teams, per the reserve clause. A district judge had denied the injunction on the grounds that it would "disturb the status quo" by restoring the plaintiffs to positions which they had voluntarily resigned three years before. Also, the judge ruled that the players' rights depended upon disputed questions of fact and law, and that they had an adequate legal remedy in the recovery of damages.

Hand and the appeals court affirmed the denial of the injunction but, with respect to the disputed questions of fact and law, added "that the cause should be preferred, and that it should be brought to trial as soon as possible."

On June 5, 1949, Chandler lifted the ban, and Martin and Lanier dropped the suit.

=== Reinstatement to U.S. pro baseball ===
Martin, nearly 34 at that point, returned to the Cardinals upon his reinstatement and posted a 6–0 mark with a 2.44 earned run average in 70 innings for the remainder of 1949. He then spent one final season in the National League with the 1950 Cards, winning four of six decisions and posting a 5.12 earned run average. Overall, Martin appeared in 57 career MLB games, won 12 games and lost only three, with an earned run average of 3.78 in 162 innings pitched. Martin pitched in the minor leagues through the 1950s; his last pitching appearance came as the 45-year-old playing manager of the Class C St. Cloud Rox. Martin appeared in 618 minor league games between 1935 and 1960, and won 169 of 304 decisions.

=== Taught 'split-finger fastball' ===
In addition, he would have a long post-playing career as a scout, minor league manager and pitching coach, largely in the Chicago Cubs organization. He was a member of the Cubs' College of Coaches from 1961 to 1965 and served as a minor league instructor for the Cubs (1966–1975; 1977–1978) and Detroit Tigers (1976). He became especially famous as a proponent of the split-finger fastball, which he taught to Cub farmhand Bruce Sutter, who mastered it, became a dominant relief pitcher in the 1970s and 1980s, and was elected to the Baseball Hall of Fame in 2006.

Sutter's success focused industry-wide attention on Martin's expertise. In 1979, former Cub shortstop Don Kessinger, named the playing manager of the Chicago White Sox, asked him to be his pitching coach, but Martin was ill with cancer. He began treatments in March, and served only a few weeks in the job. He died June 11, 1979, in Chicago, at the age of 63 of cancer.

Preceded by Stan Williams	Chicago White Sox pitching coach 1979	Succeeded by Ron Schueler
