= Bob Kennedy =

American baseball player, manager, and executive (1920–2005)

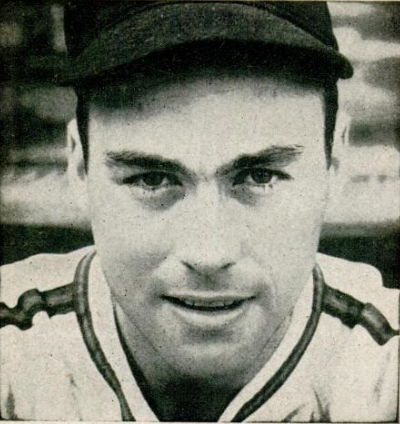
- Kennedy in 1947
- Outfielder / Third baseman / Manager
- Born: August 18, 1920; Chicago, Illinois, U.S.
- Died: April 7, 2005 (aged 84); Mesa, Arizona, U.S.
- Batted: Right Threw: Right

MLB debut
- September 14, 1939, for the Chicago White Sox

Last MLB appearance
- September 29, 1957, for the Brooklyn Dodgers

MLB statistics
- Batting average: .254
- Home runs: 63
- Runs batted in: 514
- Managerial record: 264–278
- Winning %: .487
- Stats at Baseball Reference
- Managerial record at Baseball Reference

Teams
- As player: Chicago White Sox (1939–1942, 1946–1948); Cleveland Indians (1948–1954); Baltimore Orioles (1954–1955); Chicago White Sox (1955–1956); Detroit Tigers (1956); Chicago White Sox (1957); Brooklyn Dodgers (1957); As manager: Chicago Cubs (1963–1965); Oakland Athletics (1968)

Career highlights and awards
- World Series champion (1948)

Robert Daniel Kennedy (August 18, 1920 – April 7, 2005) was an American professional baseball right fielder, third baseman, manager and executive in Major League Baseball.

From 1939 to 1957, Kennedy played for the Chicago White Sox (1939–42, 1946–48, 1955–56, 1957), Cleveland Indians (1948–54), Baltimore Orioles (1954–55), Detroit Tigers (1956) and Brooklyn Dodgers (1957). He batted and threw right-handed. After his playing career, Kennedy managed the Chicago Cubs (1963–65) and Oakland Athletics (1968). His son, former major league catcher Terry Kennedy, was a four-time All-Star and minor league manager.

== Strong-armed third baseman and rightfielder ==
Kennedy was born in Chicago. A line-drive hitter, he had a strong and accurate throwing arm. On June 22, 1937, the night before the White Sox signed him, Kennedy was working as a 16-year-old popcorn vendor at Comiskey Park during the World Heavyweight Boxing Title between Joe Louis and James J. Braddock. Kennedy debuted a year later, and became the starting third baseman in 1940. In 1940, he became the first teenaged major leaguer since 1900 to play 150 games in a season. After a break of three years to serve in the military during World War II, he returned, to play mostly in right field.

In the 1948 midseason Kennedy was sent to Cleveland in the same trade that brought Pat Seerey to Chicago. Kennedy hit .301 the rest of the year and became a member of the last World Championship Indians team. His most productive season came in 1950, when he posted career-highs in batting average (.291), runs (79), hits (157) and doubles (27). The same season, he started two triple plays from the right field, matching Indians left fielder Charlie Jamieson's two triple plays of 1928.

Kennedy was traded to the newly relocated Baltimore Orioles in 1954. On July 30, he belted the first grand slam for Baltimore against Yankees pitcher Allie Reynolds.

In 1955, Kennedy was purchased by the White Sox and sent to Detroit in 1956. Released in April 1957, he signed as a free agent with the White Sox, for his third stint with the club. A month later, he was selected off waivers by the Brooklyn Dodgers, being released at the end of the season. Kennedy is the answer to the trivia question who was the last man to ever bat for the Brooklyn Dodgers. At 3:36pm, Kennedy flew out to centerfield on a 2–2 pitch with two out and no one on in the 9th inning of the last Brooklyn Dodger game ever played on Sunday, September 29, 1957, at Connie Mack Stadium in Philadelphia. Phillies defeated the Brooklyn Dodgers 3–2. Seth Morehead, a rookie lefthander was the pitcher for the Phillies. This game marked his major league debut as a starter and was the only time all season Brooklyn lost to a lefthander. They had been 6–0 against lefties throughout 1957.

== Career as manager, coach and executive ==
Following his retirement, he was a scout and farm system director for the Indians, and manager of the Triple-A Salt Lake City Bees.

During the 1962 season, Kennedy was named to the Cubs' College of Coaches. The Cubs had experimented with having a committee of coaches run the team on the field since 1961, as opposed to having a single manager. However, after the 1962 season ended with what is still the worst record in franchise history, owner Phil Wrigley named Kennedy as "head coach" for an indefinite period. After Kennedy led the 1963 Cubs to their first winning record in 17 years, he began to assert a more traditional managerial authority over the team. He served as head coach from 1963 until June 13, 1965, posting a 162–198 record. He served as special assistant to Cub general manager John Holland, manager of the Los Angeles Dodgers' Double-A Albuquerque affiliate, and a coach with the Atlanta Braves until 1968.

In 1968, when the Athletics moved from Kansas City to Oakland, Kennedy was their first manager. Oakland finished sixth in a 10-team league with an 82–80 record, a notable improvement from the 62–99 last-place 1967 Athletics. It was also the franchise's first winning season since 1952, when the team was still in Philadelphia. According to the 1972 book Mustache Gang, authored by Ron Bergman, on the last day of the season Kennedy walked into Charlie Finley's office, expecting an extension. Five minutes later, Kennedy had been fired. After that, he spent six years (1970–75) as director of player development and director of player personnel of the St. Louis Cardinals, and 1976 as a member of the Seattle Mariners' start-up baseball operations team preparing for the club's 1977 debut in Major League Baseball.

Kennedy returned to the Cubs to succeed Salty Saltwell as general manager on November 24, 1976. His first act was to name Herman Franks as his first and only choice to replace Jim Marshall as manager. He resigned from the position and was succeeded by Franks on an interim basis on May 22, 1981.

Rounding out his baseball career, Kennedy then served as a senior baseball operations executive for the Houston Astros (1982–85) and San Francisco Giants (1986–92), assisting his former Cleveland teammate Al Rosen, then the president or general manager of those teams.

In a 16-season playing career, Kennedy was a .254 hitter with 63 home runs and 514 RBI in 1,483 games. As a manager, he posted a 264–278 record in two-plus seasons.

Kennedy died in Mesa, Arizona, aged 84.

Sporting positions
Preceded by Charlie Metro	Chicago Cubs head coach February 20, 1963–June 13, 1965	Succeeded by Lou Klein
Preceded by Luke Appling (Kansas City Athletics)	Oakland Athletics manager 1968	Succeeded by Hank Bauer
