= Harry Craft =

American baseball player and manager (1915–1995)

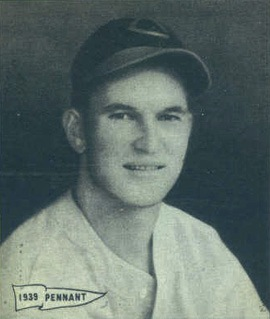
- Center fielder / Manager
- Born: April 19, 1915; Ellisville, Mississippi, U.S.
- Died: August 3, 1995 (aged 80); Conroe, Texas, U.S.
- Batted: Right Threw: Right

MLB debut
- September 19, 1937, for the Cincinnati Reds

Last MLB appearance
- July 14, 1942, for the Cincinnati Reds

MLB statistics
- Batting average: .253
- Home runs: 44
- Runs batted in: 267
- Stats at Baseball Reference
- Managerial record at Baseball Reference

Teams
- As player: Cincinnati Reds (1937–1942); As manager: Kansas City Athletics (1957–1959); Chicago Cubs (1961) (as Head Coach); Houston Colt .45s (1962–1964); As coach: Kansas City Athletics (1955–1957); Chicago Cubs (1960–1961)

Career highlights and awards
- World Series champion (1940); Cincinnati Reds Hall of Fame

Harry Francis Craft (April 19, 1915 – August 3, 1995) was an American professional baseball player and manager. Born in Ellisville, Mississippi, he attended Mississippi College. In Major League Baseball, Craft appeared in 566 games, almost exclusively as a center fielder, for the Cincinnati Reds from 1937 to 1942. He threw and batted right-handed, stood 6 feet 1 inch (1.85 m) tall and weighed 185 pounds (84 kg).

From 1962 through September 18, 1964, Craft was the first manager in Houston's MLB history as skipper of the expansion Houston Colt .45s, later the Astros. Earlier, he managed the Kansas City Athletics (August 6, 1957 through 1959) and was the "head coach" of the Chicago Cubs (April 26–May 10 and June 2–4, 1961).

== Playing career ==
A top-flight defensive center-fielder, Craft proved to be mediocre hitter during his short big-league career. He broke in with Cincinnati in September 1937 at age 22 after three minor-league campaigns, starting ten late-season games and collecting 13 hits in 42 at bats. His first full season, 1938, was also memorable. The Reds improved by 27 games in the standings and finished in the National League's first division. On June 15, Craft caught the ninth-inning fly ball (hit by Leo Durocher) to record the final out that gave Johnny Vander Meer his historic, second consecutive no-hitter. Craft batted a solid .270 as the Reds' everyday center-fielder with 15 home runs and 83 RBIs in 151 games. He had 165 hits that season in 612 at bats. All those numbers ended up being Craft's career-bests.

The next two years saw Cincinnati reach baseball's pinnacle, winning the 1939 NL pennant, then repeating as Senior Circuit champs and capturing the 1940 World Series against the Detroit Tigers. But Craft's offensive production declined.

In 1939, his numbers fell off in every category, from games played (to 134), hits (to 129), extra-base hits (from 52 to 40), batting average (to .257), homers (to 13), RBI (to 67), and slugging percentage (from .402 to .353). Although Craft started all four games of the 1939 World Series and batted sixth in the Red lineup, he mustered only one hit in 11 at bats, an infield single off Red Ruffing in Game 1. Cincinnati was swept by the New York Yankees.

Unfazed, the 1940 Reds repeated as NL champions, weathering the tragic August suicide of catcher Willard Hershberger and winning an even 100 games. On June 8, 1940, Craft hit for the cycle and went five-for-five with four runs scored in a 23–2 thrashing of the Dodgers at Crosley Field. The performance lifted Craft's season batting average to .289—but he could not sustain it. In mid-August, Craft began to split center-field duty with hard-hitting rookie Mike McCormick, and by the time the Fall Classic rolled around, McCormick was the acknowledged regular in the Red lineup. After batting only .244 with diminished production in 115 regular-season games, Craft appeared only once in the seven-game 1940 World Series; pinch hitting for Whitey Moore in Game 1, he flied out to left-field off Bobo Newsom.

Craft's 1941 season saw his offensive decline plateau. He batted .249 in 119 games with improved on-base and slugging percentages. But in 1942, his struggles at bat increased drastically. He was hitting only .125 in 14 starts over the season's first three weeks, and despite a three-hit game against Brooklyn June 28, he was still at only .177 in 33 games by July 16, when the Reds traded him on waivers to the New York Yankees. The Bombers sent him immediately to the Kansas City Blues, one of their two top affiliates, and Craft's MLB playing career was over at age 27. He appeared in 66 games for the Blues in 1942 and 1943 before serving in the United States Navy in the Pacific Theater of World War II, missing 2½ seasons. He resumed his playing career, at 31, with the Blues from 1946 through 1948.

In six major-league seasons, all with Cincinnati, Craft had an all-time .253 batting average with 533 hits, 85 doubles, 25 triples, 44 home runs and 267 RBIs in 566 games played. He accumulated 14 stolen bases and 237 runs scored. His lifetime fielding percentage was .986.

== Managerial career ==
=== Minor leagues ===
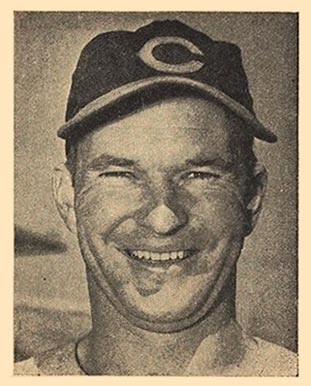
Craft in 1940

After spending all or parts of five seasons in their organization at Kansas City, Craft began his managing career in the Yankees' farm system in 1949. That season, he helped 17-year-old Mickey Mantle break into professional baseball with the Independence Yankees of the Class D Kansas–Oklahoma–Missouri League; Mantle hit .313 in 89 games and Independence won the league championship. In 1950, Craft managed Mantle again with the Joplin Miners in the Class C Western Association; Mickey broke through with a .383 batting average and 26 home runs.

"I was lucky to have Harry as skipper my first two years", Mantle said years later. "He started me out right."

While Mantle would burst onto the major-league scene in 1951, Craft worked his way up the Yankee organization, piloting the Double-A Beaumont Roughnecks (1951–1952), then returning to the Triple-A Blues of the American Association as their skipper in 1953–1954. He was Kansas City's last minor-league manager before it entered the American League in 1955.

=== Major League ===
==== Kansas City Athletics ====
Craft went from the minor-league Blues to the MLB Athletics in 1955, their first year in Kansas City after transferring from Philadelphia, when he was named a coach on the staff of Lou Boudreau. In 1957, with the 36–67 Athletics mired in Boudreau's third straight losing season, he was released on August 6 and Craft was named his successor. The club responded to the change, going 23–27, and Craft returned for two more seasons: 1958, when the Athletics improved to a 73–81 mark, and 1959. That year, Craft temporarily handed the team over to coach Bob Swift for 15 games in mid-season, including a 13-game stretch from July 21 to August 2 when he was hospitalized for extreme fatigue, first feared to be a heart ailment. Kansas City posted a 13–2 record under Swift, but went only 15–37 when Craft returned from sick leave and he was dismissed at season's end.

Craft finished with a 149–194–2 record at Kansas City. His best finish was seventh place in the eight-team American League.

After mentoring Mickey Mantle in the minors, Craft managed Roger Maris from the young right-fielder's June 15, 1958, acquisition by the Athletics from the Cleveland Indians through the end of the 1959 campaign. Maris—who attained baseball fame after his December 11, 1959, trade to the Yankees—later credited Craft with helping him with his hitting.

==== Chicago Cubs ====
A year after joining the coaching staff of the 1960 Chicago Cubs, Craft became a member of Cubs' owner Phil Wrigley's ill-fated College of Coaches. From 1961 to 1965, the team had no permanent manager, and in 1961 rotated the "head coach" job among its coaching staff. Craft led the Cubs for 16 games that season, coming out 7–9 during two brief terms in May and June as one of Wrigley's four head coaches that year.

During 1961, Craft also briefly returned to the minors when the Cubs assigned him to manage the Triple-A Houston Buffs of the American Association. He served as the last manager in Houston's minor-league history before his September 19 promotion made him the first skipper of Houston's National League expansion team when the Houston Colt .45s entered the majors in 1962.

==== Houston Colt .45s ====
1962 picture pack card of Craft for Houston Colt .45s

Craft managed the Colt .45s from 1962 to 1964, before his replacement by Lum Harris in the closing days of the 1964 season. In his first season, the Colt .45s finished in eighth place in the ten-team league with a 64–96–2 record, but six full games ahead of the ninth-place Cubs, then in their 87th year in the NL. But in 1963 and 1964, the Colt .45s fell into ninth place, ahead of only their expansion brethren, the New York Mets.

Craft ended 191–280–2 with the Colt .45s, and in all or parts of seven big-league seasons posted a 347–483–4 (.418) record, according to Retrosheet, which credits Swift for the 1959 Athletics' record during his emergency tenure. Baseball Reference, which attributes Kansas City's entire 1959 season to Craft, lists his career mark as 360–485–4 (.426).

He remained in the game after 1964 as a scout and farm system official for the Baltimore Orioles, San Francisco Giants and the Yankees before retiring in 1991.

==== Managerial/head coaching record ====
Team	Year	Regular season					Postseason			
Team	Year	Games	Won	Lost	Win %	Finish	Won	Lost	Win %	Result
KCA	1957	50	23	27	.460	Seventh in AL	–	–	–	–
KCA	1958	156	73	81	.474	Seventh in AL	–	–	–	–
KCA	1959	139	53	86	.381	Seventh in AL	–	–	–	–
KCA total		345	149	194	.434		0	0	–	
CHC	1961	16	7	9	.438	Seventh in NL	–	–	–	–
CHC total		16	7	9	.438		0	0	–	
HOU	1962	162	64	96	.400	Eighth in NL	–	–	–	–
HOU	1963	162	66	96	.407	Ninth in NL	–	–	–	–
HOU	1964	149	61	88	.409	Ninth in NL	–	–	–	–
HOU total		473	191	280	.406		0	0	–	
Total		834	347	483	.418		0	0	–	

== Death ==
Harry Craft died after a long illness in Conroe, Texas, at the age of 80 on Thursday, August 3, 1995.

== See also ==
- List of Major League Baseball players to hit for the cycle

Achievements
Preceded by Arky Vaughan	Hitting for the cycle June 8, 1940	Succeeded by Harry Danning

Sporting positions
Preceded by Lou Boudreau	Kansas City Athletics manager 1957–1959	Succeeded by Bob Elliott
Preceded by Vedie Himsl; El Tappe	Chicago Cubs head coach April 26–May 10, 1961; June 2–4, 1961	Succeeded by Vedie Himsl; Vedie Himsl
Preceded by Franchise established	Houston Colt .45s manager 1962–1964	Succeeded by Lum Harris
