= Vedie Himsl =

American baseball coach and manager

- Coach/Head coach
- Born: April 2, 1917; Plevna, Montana, U.S.
- Died: March 15, 2004 (aged 86); Chicago, Illinois, U.S.
- Batted: Right Threw: Right

MLB debut
- April 11, 1961, for the Chicago Cubs

Last MLB appearance
- June 7, 1961, for the Chicago Cubs

MLB statistics
- Games managed: 31
- Head coaching record: 10–21
- Winning percentage: .323
- Stats at Baseball Reference

Teams
- As coach: Chicago Cubs (1960–1964)

Avitus Bernard "Vedie" Himsl (April 2, 1917 – March 15, 2004) was an American professional baseball player, manager, coach and scout. Born in Plevna, Montana, Himsl was a member of the class of 1938 from Saint John's University in Collegeville, Minnesota.

== Career ==
Himsl was listed as 6-foot-1-inch (1.85 m) tall and 180 pounds (82 kg). A right-handed pitcher in minor league baseball in his playing days (1938–42; 1946; 1950–51), he peaked at the top level of the minors with the St. Paul Saints of the American Association, where he won 51 games over four seasons.

Himsl managed and scouted for the St. Louis Cardinals' organization before joining the Chicago Cubs in the mid-1950s as a scout and minor league skipper. In 1960, he was named to the coaching staff of the MLB Cubs, when the team struggled to a 60–94 record, one game out of last place in the National League. The offseason resulted in a management overhaul and owner Philip K. Wrigley's creation of the College of Coaches, in which (rather than hiring a full-time manager) all of the team's coaches would rotate as "head coach" of the Major League Cubs and their farm teams.

Himsl was named the first head coach in the history of the College of Coaches. He posted a 10–21 win–loss record (.323) over three different terms during the 1961 season (April 11–23; May 12–30; June 5–7). His first term, from Opening Day through the club's first 11 games, produced a 5–6 mark. But in his subsequent turns as the Cubs' pilot, the team lost 15 out of 20 games. Himsl also spent part of the 1961 season managing the Cubs' Wenatchee Chiefs affiliate in the Class B Northwest League. He coached for the Cubs through 1964, although he spent all of that campaign as the manager of the Triple-A Salt Lake City Bees of the Pacific Coast League.

In 1965, Himsl turned to scouting and front-office administration in the Chicago organization, with time out for two years as director of MLB's Central Scouting Bureau, and retired in 1985 as the Cubs' director of scouting. He was listed as a scouting consultant for the Cubs as late as 1999, and continued to live in Chicago until his death in 2004.

Sporting positions
Preceded by Lou Boudreau (1960 manager); Harry Craft; Harry Craft	Chicago Cubs head coach April 11–23, 1961; May 12–30, 1961; June 5–7, 1961	Succeeded by Harry Craft; El Tappe; El Tappe
