= Ken Staples =

Kenneth Arthur Staples (November 9, 1926 – September 8, 2014) was a minor league baseball player and manager.

== Early life ==
Staples attended Humboldt High School in St. Paul, Minnesota. He was born in St. Paul, Minnesota, United States.

== Career ==
=== Baseball player ===
Staples played professionally from 1945 to 1950 and from 1953 to 1954, mostly as a catcher. His batting average was .264 in 672 games during career in the minor leagues, which spanned eight years. In 1946, his batting average was .382 in 81 games for the Grand Forks Chiefs and St. Paul Saints.

=== Baseball manager ===
Staples began his managerial career in 1966 with success, with the St. Cloud Rox of the Northern League, which resulted in a 49–18 record, finishing in first-place, and a league championship. In 1967, when he managed the St. Cloud Rox, the season ended with a 44–26 record, a first-place finish and another league championship. In 1971, he again managed the St. Cloud Rox, leading them to the same results with a 42–28 record, first-place finish and league championship.

Staples returned in the 1981 season managing the Wisconsin Rapids Twins, which led to a 68–65 record and fourth-place finish in the Midwest League. 1982 ended with a 56–82 record and an 11th-place finish. Staples overall record managing in the minor league is 259-219 and a winning percentage of .542.

Staples taught and coached baseball at Robbinsdale Cooper High School in the mid-1980s. He coached baseball at Wayzata High School in 1990 and 1992.

Among the awards and honors Staples received: 1959 - Selected Mr. Tommy, University of St. Thomas, St. Paul, MN; 1978 - State of Minnesota Proclamation Award for high school hockey from Minnesota Governor Rudy Perpich; 1979 - WCCO Radio Honors - Ken Staples Day; 1986 - Inducted into the Mobile Alabama Hall of Fame for baseball; 1992 - Inducted into the Mancini's Sports Hall of Fame for baseball; 1992 - Inducted into the University of St. Thomas Hall of Fame for baseball; 1998 - Honored by St. Paul High Schools as one of the top 100 athletes in 100 years; 2006 - Inducted into the Humboldt High School Athletic Hall of Fame; 2006 - Inducted into the Minnesota High School Hockey Hall of Fame; 2009 - inducted to the Osceola Braves Hall of Fame; 2010 - Inducted to the Minnesota High School Baseball Coaches Hall of Fame.

Staples died in 2014 in Champlin, Minnesota. at the age of 87.

== See also ==
- 1951 Caribbean Series
