= Joe Macko =

American baseball player (1928–2014)

Macko with the Dallas Eagles

Joseph John Macko (February 19, 1928 – December 26, 2014) was an American long-time minor league baseball first baseman who hit over 300 home runs at that level. He also managed in the minors for three seasons. He was born in Port Clinton, Ohio.

== Career ==
Macko played from 1948 to 1964 and again in 1970, hitting .272 with 306 home runs in 1,987 games. He eclipsed the 20-home run mark seven times and the 25-home run mark five times, hitting a career high of 37 in 1956, while splitting the season between the San Diego Padres and Dallas Eagles. He also pitched for parts of four seasons, compiling a record of 11–7 with a 3.70 ERA in 37 games (15 starts). For the 1948 Batavia Clippers, he was one of the primary starters.

In 1961, he managed the St. Cloud Rox, leading the team to the league finals, which they lost. He managed the Wenatchee Chiefs in 1962 and again in 1964, leading them to a league championship victory in his first year with the team. In 1963, he skippered the Amarillo Gold Sox, and through those years managed multiple notable players, including Hall of Fame outfielder Lou Brock and major league All-Star slugger Roger Maris.

Following his playing and managerial career, Macko was the general manager of the Dallas-Fort Worth Spurs in 1970 and 1971 before becoming the longtime clubhouse manager for the Texas Rangers.

He was also a member of the Chicago Cubs' College of Coaches in 1964.

== Death ==
On December 26, 2014, Joe Macko died at the age of 86.

== Personal life ==
His son, Steve Macko, played for the Chicago Cubs in 1979 and 1980, but died in 1981 at age 27 as the result of testicular cancer.
