= Goldie Holt =

- Coach
- Born: March 22, 1902; Enloe, Texas, U.S.
- Died: June 11, 1991 (aged 89); Burbank, California, U.S.
- Batted: Right Threw: Right
- Stats at Baseball Reference

Teams
- Pittsburgh Pirates (1948–1950); Chicago Cubs (1961–1965)

Golden Desmond Holt (March 22, 1902 – June 11, 1991) was an American professional baseball player, scout, coach and manager. An outfielder and third baseman by trade, the native of Enloe, Texas, logged his playing and managing career exclusively in minor league baseball, but served the Pittsburgh Pirates and Chicago Cubs as a coach on the Major League level, and spent two separate terms scouting for the Dodgers in both Brooklyn and Los Angeles.

The 5 ft 7 in (1.70 m), 165 lb (75 kg) Holt played 23 years of minor league ball (1924–42; 1944–47), although he was a playing manager for six of those seasons. He came to the Majors as a coach under Billy Meyer of the Pirates from 1948 to 1950, then scouted and managed in the farm system for the Dodgers from 1951 to 1958. He switched to the Cubs' organization as a member of its College of Coaches experiment from 1961 to 1965, then returned to the Dodgers as a scout through the early 1980s. During that time, he taught Charlie Hough how to throw a knuckleball.

Goldie Holt died at age 89 in Burbank, California.

== See also ==
- College of Coaches
