= El Tappe =

American baseball player and coach (1927–1998)

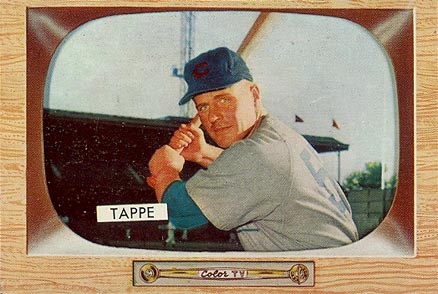
- Catcher
- Born: May 21, 1927; Quincy, Illinois, U.S.
- Died: October 10, 1998 (aged 71); Quincy, Illinois, U.S.
- Batted: Right Threw: Right

MLB debut
- April 24, 1954, for the Chicago Cubs

Last MLB appearance
- July 17, 1962, for the Chicago Cubs

MLB statistics
- Batting average: .207
- Home runs: 0
- Runs batted in: 17
- Stats at Baseball Reference

Teams
- As player: Chicago Cubs (1954–1956, 1958, 1960, 1962); As coach: Chicago Cubs (1959–1965)

Elvin Walter Tappe (May 21, 1927 – October 10, 1998) was an American professional baseball player, a catcher for the Chicago Cubs between 1954 and 1962, who was best known as a member of Philip K. Wrigley's College of Coaches during the 1961 and 1962 seasons.

== Playing career ==
Tappe was a native and lifelong resident of Quincy, Illinois, where he attended high school and Quincy University. His professional baseball career began in 1947 with the Henderson Oilers, an unaffiliated team in the Class C Lone Star League. In 1950, he was acquired by the New York Yankees' organization and then drafted by the Cubs two seasons later. Listed as 5 feet 11 inches (1.80 m) tall and 180 pounds (82 kg), he threw and batted right-handed.

Tappe made his major league debut on April 24, 1954, as a late-inning defensive replacement for Chicago catcher Joe Garagiola, and would appear in 145 games for the Cubs over all or parts of six seasons during the next nine years. Described as a "weak hitter, without power," he collected only 63 hits (including ten doubles) and batted .207 with 17 runs batted in during his MLB tenure. However, he would prove valuable to the Cubs as the author of their organization-wide instruction manual, and as a "motivator with an enthusiastic attitude" whose "strength was in the development of pitchers and catchers".

Tappe became a coach with Cubs in 1959 and after two years in that post, he assumed an influential role in the development of the "College of Coaches" after the 1960 season.

== The College of Coaches ==
Years later, Tappe said the concept was his idea. During the 1960–61 off-season, according to his account, he suggested to owner Wrigley that he not allow Lou Boudreau's successor as manager to bring in his own coaches, as had long been standard practice. Rather, he suggested hiring eight veterans from the Cubs organization as coaches—four in the minors and four for the Cubs—in hopes of retaining some stability during managerial changes. Wrigley liked the idea, but added a twist: one of the coaches should also be the manager. The Cubs played the entire 1961 season with the coaches rotating in the "head coach" position. Tappe served as head coach for 95 games over three separate stints, while Vedie Himsl, Harry Craft and Lou Klein managed 31, 16 and 11 games respectively.

Tappe ended 1961 as head coach and began 1962 in that role. Since he notched a 42–54 record in 1961—by far the best of the four who led the club—it was generally believed that he would remain head coach as long as the Cubs were playing well. Additionally, it was obvious he was Wrigley's favorite. However, the Cubs stumbled to a 4–16 start in 1962, and he was replaced by Klein. The 1962 head coaching assignment ended Tappe's managerial career with a win–loss record of 46–70–1 (.397). He returned to his backup catcher role for what would be his last year as a player, getting into 26 games. He then remained with the Cubs for some years afterward as a coach, minor league manager and scout.

== Personal life ==
Tappe (whose surname rhymed with "happy") was the son of Walter Emil Tappe and Marie Sophia (née Bronstine) Tappe. He had a twin brother, Melvin Tappe (1927–1992), who was a minor league pitcher.

Tappe ran a sporting goods store after retiring from baseball. He died in Quincy from cancer at age 71.

== See also ==
- List of Major League Baseball player–managers

Sporting positions
Preceded by Vedie Himsl; Vedie Himsl; Lou Klein	Chicago Cubs head coach May 31–June 1, 1961; June 9–August 31, 1961; September 12, 1961–April 30, 1962	Succeeded by Vedie Himsl; Lou Klein; Lou Klein
