= Dorothy Shepard =

American designer

Dorothy Shepard was a modernist designer noted for her work for Philip K. Wrigley establishing Catalina Island, California as a tourist destination and advertising Wrigley’s Chewing Gum.

== Biography ==
Born Dorothy Van Gorder in 1906 to Jessie Van Gorder of Berkeley, California and Arthur Grant Van Gorder (1867-1943) an Assistant in Physics at UC Berkeley, whose 1897 University of California commencement address as a graduating student was entitled: "Higher Education an Essential Factor in Woman's Social Position".

She showed an early aptitude for learning, art, dance, and theater. She graduated from high school as class valedictorian in less than 3 years. Then at California School of Arts and Crafts, she once again graduated in 3 years and was again class valedictorian. In 1927, just after her graduation, she was hired as an artist at Foster & Kleiser Advertising in San Francisco, where she met her husband Otis.

Dorothy and her husband Otis were hired by Philip K. Wrigley to be the creative team for all of his corporate interests. In 1936 Wrigley asked Dorothy to spearhead the development of newly acquired advertising space in Times Square in New York City. She designed a massive neon Wrigley display – eight stories tall and one block long – one of the largest neon installations ever built, even to this day. The sign depicted a fish blowing bubbles as part of the advertisement for Wrigley chewing gum. The next year, she won a National Advertising Council Award for the billboard. She also won a prize for her advertisement for Pabst beer.

In 1934, Shepard and her husband went to Catalina Island at the request of Philip K. Wrigley. Shepard and her husband Otis designed the street signage, interior designs, tile design, textiles, murals, the staff uniforms, leaflets, pamphlets, and advertisements found throughout the island.

== Personal life ==
In 1929, she married Otis 'Shep' Shepard (born in 1894) a Kansas elementary-school dropout, who joined the Army during World War I, was shipped to France, worked as a battalion artist, saw combat on three battlefields and was shot in the knee.

Dorothy divorced Otis in the 1940s.

"the marriage fell apart in the early 1940s because of Shep's womanizing and alcoholism"

They got together again in the early 1960s, remaining together until Otis’s death in 1969. Dorothy Shepard died in December 2000, in Belvedere, California.
