= Rox Park =

Baseball park in St. Cloud, Minnesota

Coordinates: 45°33′08″N 94°11′21″W

Rox Park, also known as Municipal Stadium, was a baseball park located in St. Cloud, Minnesota. It opened in 1948 and served as the home stadium for the minor league St. Cloud Rox through the 1970 season. The stadium was demolished in 1971 and was replaced by a ShopKo department store, a Byerly's grocery store and a small enclosed two story mall. Home plate was retained and located in the entryway of the ShopKo store until the early 1990s. Its seating capacity fluctuated from 5,000 in 1947 to 3,600 in 1949.
