= St. Cloud Rox (minor league baseball) =

- 1946–1971; St. Cloud, Minnesota

Minor league affiliations
- Class: Class C (1946–1962); Class-A (1963–1964); Class A Short Season (1965–1971)
- League: Northern League (1946-1971)

Major league affiliations
- Team: Minnesota Twins (1965–1971); Chicago Cubs (1960–1964); San Francisco Giants (1958–1959); New York Giants (1946–1957)

Minor league titles
- League titles (7): 1946; 1955; 1965; 1966; 1967; 1968; 1971

Team data
- Name: St. Cloud Rox (1948–1971)
- Ballpark: Rox Park (1948–1971)

The St. Cloud Rox were a professional minor league baseball team that existed from 1946 to 1971 in St Cloud, Minnesota, playing in the Northern League for the duration of the franchise.

The St. Cloud Rox were an affiliate of the Minnesota Twins (1965–1971), Chicago Cubs (1960–1964), San Francisco Giants (1958–1959) and New York Giants (1946–1957).

Baseball Hall of Fame members Dave Bancroft (1947), Lou Brock (1961), Orlando Cepeda (1956) and Gaylord Perry (1958) are St. Cloud Rox alumni.

== History ==
Located in St. Cloud, Minnesota, the team played its entire existence in the Northern League. The Rox were affiliates of the New York Giants from 1946 to 1957, the San Francisco Giants from 1958 to 1959, the Chicago Cubs from 1960 to 1964 and the Minnesota Twins from 1965 to 1971.

The original Rox ceased playing after the 1971 season when the old Northern League folded. Hall of Fame players to play for the Rox include Lou Brock, Orlando Cepeda and Gaylord Perry. Hall of Famer Dave Bancroft managed the team in 1947.

In 1997, collegiate summer baseball returned organized baseball to St. Cloud when the Dubuque Mud Puppies of the Northwoods League relocated and became the St. Cloud River Bats. In 2012, the River Bats renamed themselves to the Rox in honor of the previous Rox franchise.

== Ballpark ==
The Rox played at Rox Park, also known as Municipal Stadium, located at Division Street and 25th Avenue. It opened in 1948 and was demolished in 1971. The park capacity fluctuated from 5,000 in 1947 to 3,600 in 1949. The played their final season at the newly constructed Municipal Stadium (now Dick Putz Field).

== Year-by-year records ==
Year	Record	Finish	Manager	Playoffs
1946	73–31	1st	Walter Kopp	League Champs
1947	48–71	7th	Dave Bancroft	
1948	78–40	2nd	Charlie Fox	Lost in 1st round
1949	65–59	3rd	Charlie Fox	Lost in 1st round
1950	72–51	1st	Charlie Fox	Lost in 1st round
1951	64–55	2nd	Harold Kollar	Lost in 1st round
1952	60–64	6th	Charlie Fox	
1953	66–59	3rd	Charlie Fox	Lost in 1st round
1954	76–54	2nd	Charlie Fox	Lost in 1st round
1955	78–47	2nd	Charlie Fox	League Champs
1956	61–64	6th	Charlie Fox	
1957	59–63	5th	Pete Pavlick	
1958	72–50	1st	Richard Klaus	Lost League Finals
1959	43–80	8th	Richard Klaus	
1960	49–74	8th	Fred Martin	
1961	73–54	3rd	Joe Macko	Lost League Finals
1962	61–63	5th	George Freese	
1963	51–69	6th	Walt Dixon	4th 16-14*
1964	54–68	5th	Walt Dixon	4th 15-18*
1965	73–23	1st	Jim Rantz	League Champs
1966	49–18	1st	Ken Staples	League Champs
1967	44–26	1st	Ken Staples	League Champs
1968	43–27	1st	Carroll Hardy	League Champs
1969	33–37	3rd	Jim Merrick	none
1970	31–39	5th	Jim Merrick	none
1971	42–28	1st	Ken Staples	League Champs

== Notable alumni ==
- Dave Bancroft (1947, MGR) Inducted Baseball Hall of Fame, 1971
- Lou Brock (1961) Inducted Baseball Hall of Fame, 1985
- Orlando Cepeda (1956) Inducted Baseball Hall of Fame, 1999
- Gaylord Perry (1958) Inducted Baseball Hall of Fame, 1991
- Matty Alou (1958) 2x MLB All-Star; 1966 NL Batting Title
- Bobby Bolin (1958)
- Steve Brye (1967)
- Charlie Fox (1948–1950, 1952–1956)
- Dave Goltz (1968)
- Carroll Hardy (1968)
- George Mitterwald (1965–1966)
- Andre Rodgers (1955)
- Jimmy Stewart (1962)
- Tony Taylor (1955) 2x MLB All-Star
- Danny Thompson (1968) Died Age 29.
- Ozzie Virgil Sr. (1953)
- Leon Wagner (1955) 3x MLB All-Star; 1962 All-Star Game Most Valuable Player
- St. Cloud Rox players
