= List of Cincinnati Reds managers =

The Cincinnati Reds are an American professional baseball franchise based in Cincinnati, Ohio. They are members of the National League Central Division in Major League Baseball. In chronological order, the Reds have played their home games in the Bank Street Grounds, League Park, the Palace of the Fans, Redland Field (later known as Crosley Field), and Riverfront Stadium (later known as Cinergy Field). Since 2003, the Reds have played their home games at Great American Ball Park.

There have been sixty-four different managers in the team's franchise history: four while it was known as the Cincinnati Red Stockings (1882–1889), four while it was known as the Cincinnati Redlegs (1953–1958) and the other fifty-six under the Cincinnati Reds (1882–1952, 1959–present). In baseball, the head coach of a team is called the manager, or more formally, the field manager. Pop Snyder was the first manager of the Reds and managed from 1882 to 1884. Sparky Anderson is the franchise's all-time leader in regular-season games managed (1,450) and regular-season game wins (863). He is followed by Bill McKechnie in both categories with 1,386 and 744, respectively. Anderson is the only Reds manager to have won the World Series twice, in 1975 and 1976. Pat Moran, Lou Piniella, and McKechnie have one World Series victory each; Moran was the manager during the Black Sox Scandal, which refers to the events that took place in the 1919 World Series. McKechnie led the team to the championship in 1940, while Piniella led the team to it in 1990. Jack McKeon is the only manager to have won the Manager of the Year Award with the Reds, which he won in 1999. The current manager of the Reds is Terry Francona. The current owner is Robert Castellini.

The manager with the highest winning percentage over a full season or more was Pop Snyder, with a winning percentage of .648. Conversely, the worst winning percentage over a full season or more in franchise history is .382 by Donie Bush, who posted a 58–94 record during the 1933 season.

== Key ==
#	Number of managers
GM	Regular-season games managed
W	Regular-season wins
L	Regular-season losses
Win%	Winning percentage
PGM	Playoff games managed
PW	Playoff wins
PL	Playoff losses
PWin%	Playoff winning percentage
† or ‡	Elected to the National Baseball Hall of Fame (‡ denotes induction as manager)

Note: Linked years link to the corresponding Major League Baseball season or year in baseball.

== Managers ==
#	Name	Term^{[a]}	GM	W	L	Win%	PGM	PW	PL	PWin%	Achievements
1	Pop Snyder	1882–1884	218	140	76	.648	—	—	—	—	1882 American Association Champion
2	Will White	1884	72	44	27	.620	—	—	—	—	
3	O. P. Caylor	1885–1886	253	128	122	.512	—	—	—	—	
4	Gus Schmelz	1887–1889	414	237	171	.581	—	—	—	—	
5	Tom Loftus	1890–1891	272	133	136	.494	—	—	—	—	
6	Charles Comiskey^{†}	1892–1894	420	202	206	.495	—	—	—	—	
7	Buck Ewing^{†}	1895–1899	708	394	297	.570	—	—	—	—	
8	Bob Allen	1900	144	62	77	.446	—	—	—	—	
9	Bid McPhee^{†}	1901–1902	207	79	124	.389	—	—	—	—	
10	Frank Bancroft	1902	16	9	7	.563	—	—	—	—	
11	Joe Kelley^{†}	1902–1905	513	275	230	.545	—	—	—	—	
12	Ned Hanlon^{‡}	1906–1907	311	130	174	.428	—	—	—	—	
13	John Ganzel	1908	155	73	81	.474	—	—	—	—	
14	Clark Griffith^{†}	1909–1911	472	222	238	.483	—	—	—	—	
15	Hank O'Day	1912	155	75	78	.460	—	—	—	—	
16	Joe Tinker^{†}	1913	156	64	89	.418	—	—	—	—	
17	Buck Herzog	1914–1916	401	165	226	.422	—	—	—	—	
18	Ivey Wingo	1916	2	1	1	.500	—	—	—	—	
19	Christy Mathewson^{†}	1916–1918	346	164	176	.482	—	—	—	—	
20	Heinie Groh	1918	10	7	3	.700	—	—	—	—	
21	Pat Moran	1919–1923	757	425	329	.564	8	5	3	.625	World Series Champion (1919)
22	Jack Hendricks	1924–1929	924	469	450	.510	—	—	—	—	
23	Dan Howley	1930–1932	463	177	285	.383	—	—	—	—	
24	Donie Bush	1933	153	58	94	.382	—	—	—	—	
25	Bob O'Farrell	1934	91	30	60	.333	—	—	—	—	
26	Burt Shotton	1934	1	1	0	1.000	—	—	—	—	
27	Chuck Dressen	1934–1937	498	214	282	.431	—	—	—	—	
28	Bobby Wallace^{†}	1937	25	5	20	.200	—	—	—	—	
29	Bill McKechnie^{‡}	1938–1946	1,386	744	636	.539	11	4	7	.364	National League Champion (1939) World Series Champion (1940)
30	Hank Gowdy	1946	4	3	1	.750	—	—	—	—	
31	Johnny Neun	1947–1948	254	117	137	.461	—	—	—	—	
32	Bucky Walters	1948–1949	206	81	123	.397	—	—	—	—	
33	Luke Sewell	1949–1952	409	174	234	.426	—	—	—	—	
34	Earle Brucker, Sr.	1952	5	3	2	.600	—	—	—	—	
35	Rogers Hornsby^{†}	1952–1953	198	91	106	.462	—	—	—	—	
36	Buster Mills	1953	8	4	4	.500	—	—	—	—	
37	Birdie Tebbetts	1954–1958	730	372	357	.510	—	—	—	—	
38	Jimmy Dykes	1958	41	24	17	.585	—	—	—	—	
39	Mayo Smith	1959	80	35	45	.438	—	—	—	—	
40	Fred Hutchinson	1959–1964	816	443	372	.544	5	1	4	.200	National League Champion (1961)
41	Dick Sisler	1964–1965	215	121	94	.563	—	—	—	—	
42	Don Heffner	1966	83	37	46	.446	—	—	—	—	
43	Dave Bristol	1966–1969	565	298	265	.529	—	—	—	—	
44	Sparky Anderson^{‡}	1970–1978	1,450	863	586	.596	42	26	16	.619	National League Champion (1970, 1972) World Series Champion (1975, 1976)
45	John McNamara	1979–1982	524	279	244	.533	3	0	3	.000	
46	Russ Nixon	1982–1983	232	101	131	.435	—	—	—	—	
47	Vern Rapp	1984	121	51	70	.421	—	—	—	—	
48	Pete Rose	1984–1989	786	412	373	.525	—	—	—	—	
49	Tommy Helms	1988 (acting), 1989	64	28	36	.438	—	—	—	—	
50	Lou Piniella	1990–1992	486	255	231	.536	10	8	2	.800	World Series Champion (1990)
51	Tony Pérez^{†}	1993	44	20	24	.455	—	—	—	—	
52	Davey Johnson	1993–1995	377	204	172	.543	7	3	4	.426	
53	Ray Knight	1996–1997, 2003 (acting)	262	125	137	.477	—	—	—	—	
54	Jack McKeon	1997–2000	551	291	259	.529	—	—	—	—	BBWAA Manager of the Year Award (1999)
55	Bob Boone	2001–2003	428	190	238	.444	—	—	—	—	
56	Dave Miley	2003–2005	289	125	164	.433	—	—	—	—	
57	Jerry Narron	2005–2007	337	157	179	.467	—	—	—	—	
58	Pete Mackanin	2007	80	41	39	.513	—	—	—	—	
59	Dusty Baker	2008–2013	972	509	463	.524	8	2	6	.250	
60	Bryan Price	2014–2018	666	279	387	.419	—	—	—	—	
61	Jim Riggleman	2018	144	64	80	.444	—	—	—	—	
62	David Bell	2019–2024	865	409	456	.473	2	0	2	.000	
63	Freddie Benavides	2024	5	1	4	.200	—	—	—	—	
64	Terry Francona	2025–present	162	83	79	.512	2	0	2	.000	

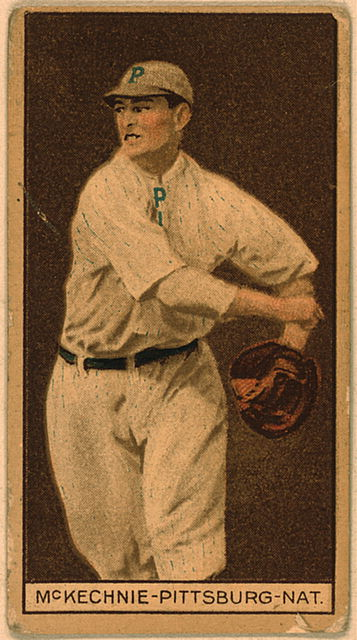
Bill McKechnie managed the Reds for eight seasons and won the World Series in 1940 with the team.

Sparky Anderson managed the Reds for eight seasons and won the World Series in 1975 and 1976 with the team.

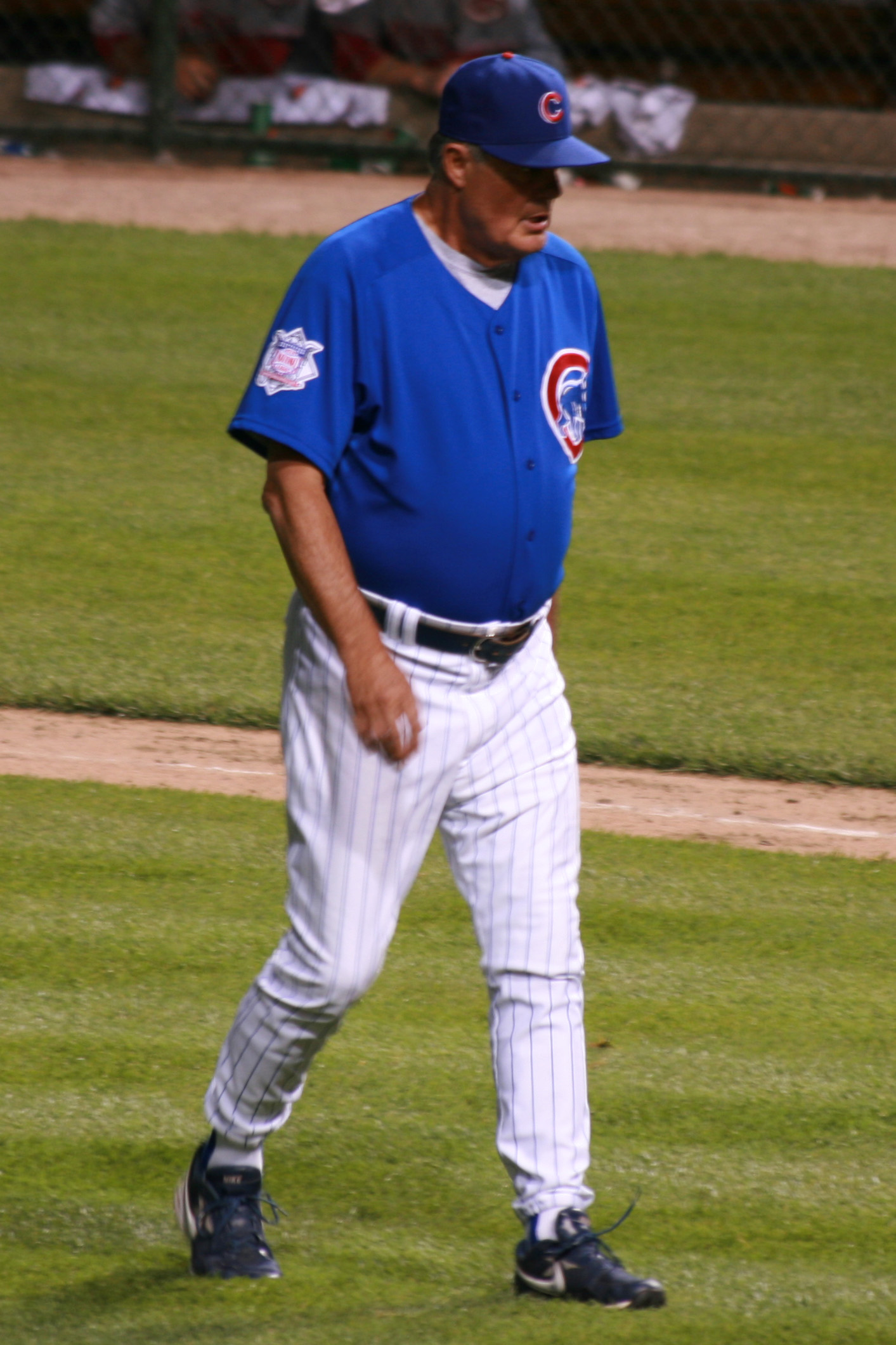
Lou Piniella (shown in a Chicago Cubs uniform) managed the Reds for three seasons and won the World Series in 1990 with the team.

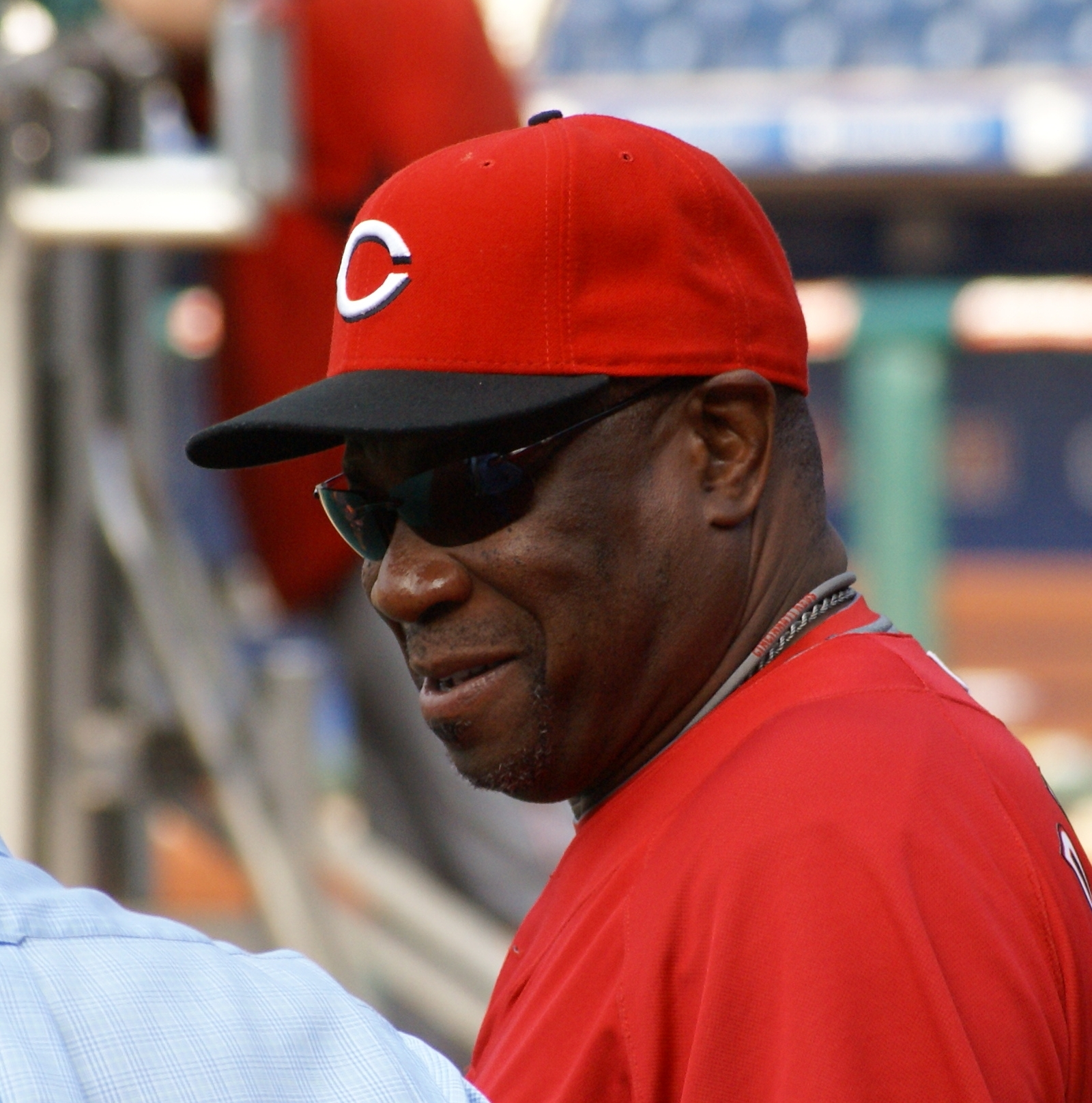
Dusty Baker managed the Reds from 2008 to 2013.

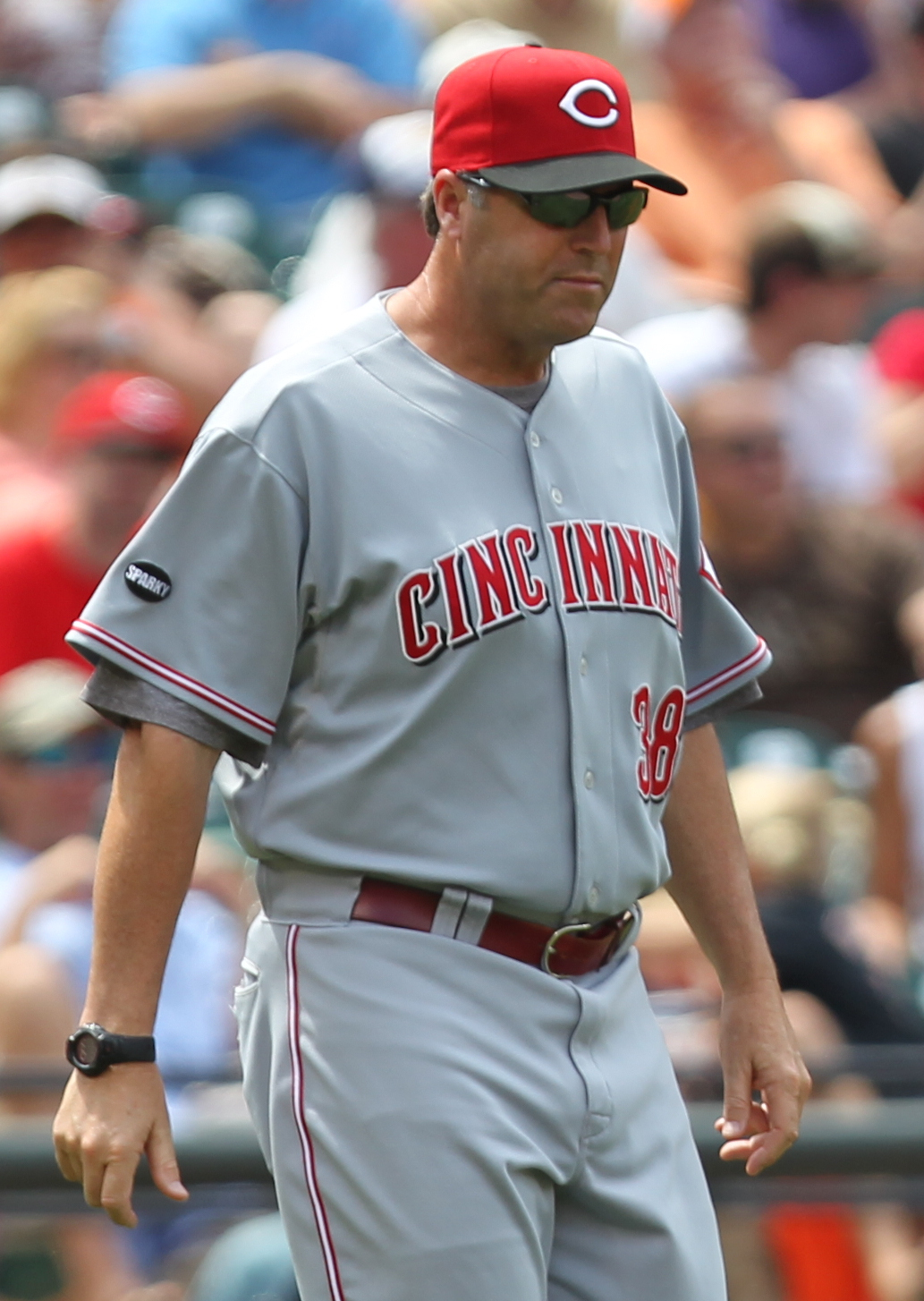
Bryan Price managed the Reds from 2014 to 2018.

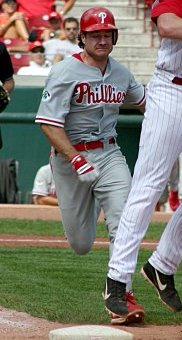
David Bell managed the Reds from 2019 to 2024.

== Note ==
- ^{a} Each year is linked to an article about that particular MLB season.
