= College of Coaches =

Coaching staff of the Chicago Cubs baseball team

- Manager

MLB statistics
- Games managed: 318 (Note: The total count of games managed includes two tie games in 1961.)
- Managerial record: 123–193
- Winning percentage: .389

Teams
- Chicago Cubs (1961–1962)

The College of Coaches was an unorthodox baseball organizational practice employed by the National League's Chicago Cubs in 1961 and 1962. After the Cubs finished 60–94 in 1960, their 14th straight NL second-division finish, Cubs owner P. K. Wrigley announced in December 1960 that the Cubs would no longer have a sole field manager, but would be led by an eight-man committee. The experiment, widely ridiculed in baseball circles, was effectively ended in 1962 before being completely abandoned in 1965.

== Concept ==
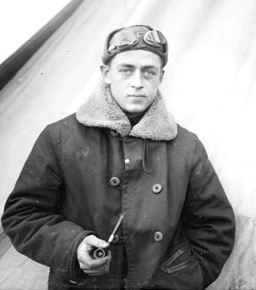
Philip K. Wrigley in 1917

After the 1960 season, owner P. K. Wrigley went to backup catcher and coach El Tappe for his input on a successor to Lou Boudreau, who had managed the Cubs from May 5 through the end of the campaign. Tappe said years later that he suggested Wrigley not allow the incoming manager to bring in his own coaches, as was standard practice. Rather, he suggested Wrigley bring in eight veterans from the Cubs organization as coaches—four for the minors and four for the Cubs. Tappe believed that if the coaches remained the same during inevitable managerial changes, the franchise would still have some consistency. Wrigley liked this idea, but added a twist—one of the coaches should also fill the manager's role.

The Cubs officially rolled out the College of Coaches during 1961 spring training. The original "faculty" included Tappe, Charlie Grimm, Goldie Holt, Bobby Adams, Harry Craft, Verlon Walker, Ripper Collins and Vedie Himsl. Each coach would serve as "head coach" for part of the season. The original concept called for the eight coaches to rotate through the entire organization from the low minors all the way to the Cubs, ensuring a standard system of play. Additionally, Wrigley argued that it would be better for the players to be exposed to the wisdom and experience of eight men rather than just one.

In announcing the experiment, Wrigley argued, "Managers are expendable. I believe there should be relief managers just like relief pitchers." He also contended that the manager system was nepotistic and led to constant turnover.

== Chaos (1961–1962) ==
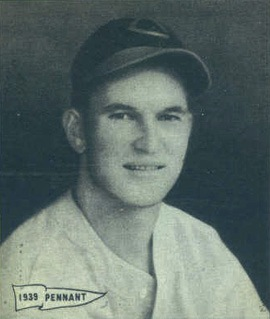
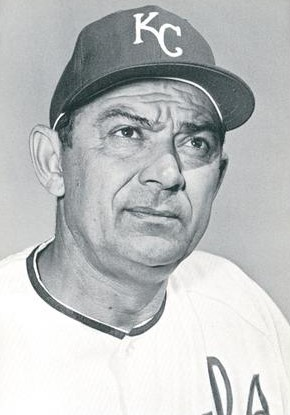
Harry Craft (left) and Charlie Metro, two members of the College of Coaches

However, there was no discernible pattern in the coaching rotation. The head coach position rotated among four different men in 1961 and three more in 1962. Occasionally the various coaches were at odds with each other. Each coach brought a different playing style and a different lineup. Additionally, according to relief pitcher Don Elston, the other coaches didn't bother to help the "head coach", leaving whoever was in charge to fend for himself.

Most of the Cubs farm teams also employed multiple managers because of the College of Coaches concept. For instance, Lou Klein, who joined the college midway through the 1961 season, found himself leading teams ranging from Class D (the equivalent of a Rookie-level team today) to the parent club during the 1961 season.

Without firm and consistent leadership, chaos reigned in the Cubs' dugout, and it showed on the field. In 1961, the Cubs finished with a 64–90 record, seventh in the eight-team National League, which was actually a slight improvement over the previous year. The 1962 season brought the worst record in Cubs history, as they finished 59–103, in ninth place in the expanded NL; only the first-year New York Mets, who lost 120 games, finished lower. Chicago finished six games behind the second expansion team, the Houston Colt .45s, in the standings. One anonymous player told the Chicago Tribune that he'd never been on a club with lower morale in his career.

== Stability and one winning season (1963–1965) ==
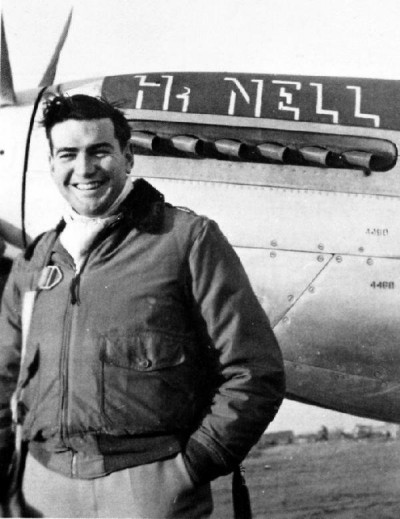
Bob Whitlow during his military service

Before the 1963 season, Wrigley designated one member of the college, Bob Kennedy, as sole head coach for at least two seasons. As early as the 1961–62 offseason, however, Wrigley had hinted that the Cubs might have a single head coach for an entire season.

At the same time, Wrigley named an "athletic director" to coordinate the system, a concept borrowed from American universities. He hired Bob Whitlow, a former United States Air Force colonel with no baseball experience, to fill the post, although team vice president John Holland remained the club's nominal general manager. Whitlow was disliked by the players for a number of reasons. In a move that particularly rankled the players, he tried to improve the batters' background at Wrigley Field by constructing a fence atop the wall in straightaway center field and allowed the ivy to twine its way up, thus forming a solid background of ivy. This resulted in several would-be home runs staying in play. To the minds of players, sportswriters and fans, this was proof that Whitlow was in over his head.

Under Kennedy, the Cubs finished 82–80 in 1963—their first winning campaign since 1946. This led Kennedy to assert a more traditional managerial authority over the team, though he still retained the title of head coach. However, they would sink back toward the bottom of the NL standings in 1964, when they went 76–86 and finished eighth.

Kennedy was shifted to the front office in June 1965 and replaced by Klein, who finished out the season; the Cubs went 72–90 and remained in eighth place. In November, Wrigley hired Leo Durocher to replace Klein. At his press conference, Durocher emphatically ended the College of Coaches experiment by declaring himself manager, with Wrigley's blessing.

The College of Coaches, which has never been attempted by another Major League Baseball team, remains widely ridiculed. Despite having several Cubs legends and fan favorites in the lineup during this time—such as Ernie Banks, Billy Williams and Ron Santo—the Cubs never finished higher than seventh during the four-year experiment, tallied only one winning record, and finished at least 17 games behind the pennant winner each season.

However, the concept of a "system" throughout all levels of the farm clubs, and of a significant number of specialty coaches, pioneered by the Brooklyn Dodgers, Baltimore Orioles, and other teams before the College of Coaches was created, is used by every major league club today.

== Members of the College of Coaches ==
- 51 Bobby Adams (1961–65)
- 59 Dick Cole (1961)
- 55 Ripper Collins (1961–63)
- 53 Harry Craft* (1961)
- 55 Alvin Dark (1965)
- 62 Walt Dixon (1964)
- 63 George Freese (1964–65)
- 55 Alex Grammas (1964)
- 50 Charlie Grimm** (1961–62)
- 54 Stan Hack (1965)
- 59 Mel Harder (1965)
- 54 Vedie Himsl* (1961–64)
- 57 Goldie Holt (1961–64)
- 61 Bob Kennedy (1962–65)
- 60 Lou Klein* (1961–65)
- 50 Whitey Lockman* (1965)
- 64 Joe Macko (1964)
- 58 Fred Martin (1961–64)
- 63 Charlie Metro (1962)
- 53 Buck O'Neil (1962–65)
- 64 Les Peden (1965)
- 52 El Tappe* (1961–65)
- 56 Verlon Walker* (1961–65)
- 59 Mel Wright (1963–64)

* Craft, Himsl, Klein, Lockman, Tappe and Walker also served as Chicago coaches either immediately before or immediately after the College of Coaches experiment.

** In 1960, the season before the college was implemented, Grimm was the manager of the Cubs from April 12 to May 4; he then was succeeded by Lou Boudreau and finished the year as a Cubs' broadcaster, before returning to uniform as a coach in 1961.

== Head coaches ==
1961

- Vedie Himsl, 10–21
- Harry Craft, 7–9
- El Tappe, 42–54
- Lou Klein, 5–6

1962

- El Tappe, 4–16
- Lou Klein, 12–18
- Charlie Metro, 43–69

1963

- Bob Kennedy, 82–80

1964

- Bob Kennedy, 76–86

1965

- Bob Kennedy, 24–32
- Lou Klein, 48–58

== Notes ==
Preceded by Lou Boudreau	Chicago Cubs manager 1961–1962	Succeeded by Bob Kennedy
