= Charlie Metro =

American baseball player, coach, manager, and scout (1918–2011)

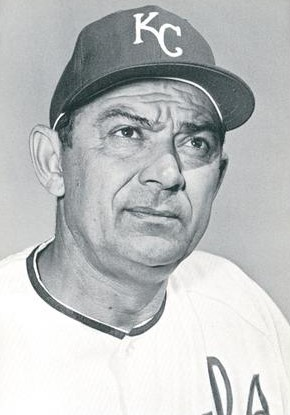
- Outfielder / Manager
- Born: April 18, 1918; Nanty Glo, Pennsylvania, U.S.
- Died: March 18, 2011 (aged 92); Buckingham, Virginia, U.S.
- Batted: Right Threw: Right

MLB debut
- May 4, 1943, for the Detroit Tigers

Last MLB appearance
- August 5, 1945, for the Philadelphia Athletics

MLB statistics
- Batting average: .193
- Home runs: 3
- Runs batted in: 23
- Managerial record: 62–102
- Winning %: .378
- Stats at Baseball Reference
- Managerial record at Baseball Reference

Teams
- As player: Detroit Tigers (1943–1944); Philadelphia Athletics (1944–1945); As manager: Chicago Cubs (1962) (Head coach); Kansas City Royals (1970); As coach: Chicago Cubs (1962); Chicago White Sox (1965); Kansas City Royals (1969); Oakland Athletics (1982)

Charlie Metro (born Charles Moreskonich; April 18, 1918 – March 18, 2011) was an American professional baseball player, manager, coach and scout. He was an outfielder for the Detroit Tigers and Philadelphia Athletics as well as the manager of the Chicago Cubs and Kansas City Royals of Major League Baseball.

Metro was born and grew up in Nanty Glo, Pennsylvania, graduating from Nanty Glo High School in 1937, and also worked in the coal mines there during breaks from school. In baseball, he took his last name from his father, Metro Moreskonich, a Ukrainian immigrant. Metro threw and batted right-handed, stood 5 feet 11 inches (1.80 m) tall and weighed 178 pounds (81 kg).

== Career ==
=== Player ===
At age 18, Metro attended a tryout camp for the St. Louis Browns, then bounced around in the minor leagues. In 1940, he joined the Texarkana Liners, then an independent baseball team but which became affiliated with the Detroit Tigers. Due to his light hitting ability, he was never able to become a full-time starter, although he did make the Tigers club out of spring training in 1943. He was released by the Tigers in 1944, partly because of his attempts to organize a players union.

The Philadelphia Athletics picked him up, and, under Connie Mack, Metro won "a shot" at starting center fielder, although his inability to hit consistently cost him this job.

In 171 major league games played, Metro had 69 hits, with 10 doubles, 2 triples and 3 home runs. Two of those blows came on consecutive days, June 23 and 24, 1945, against the New York Yankees' Jim Turner and Hank Borowy. Overall, though, Metro hit a lowly .193 with 23 runs batted in.

In the closing weeks of 1945, Metro joined the Oakland Oaks of the Pacific Coast League, where in 1946, his last season as a full-time outfielder, he played under another Hall of Fame manager, Casey Stengel.

=== Manager, coach and scout ===
In 1947, he was hired as a player-manager by the Yankees' organization, and in the mid-1950s through 1961 he helmed Triple-A clubs for the Tigers and Baltimore Orioles. In 1962, he got his first big-league managing job with the Chicago Cubs as a member of their "College of Coaches". Metro succeeded Lou Klein as "head coach" on June 12. The head coach job was designed to rotate among several members of the college, but Metro stayed in the role for 112 games and the rest of the 1962 campaign. The Cubs won 43 and lost 69 (.384) under him, and finished ninth in the ten-team National League. Metro was fired after the season; then he joined the crosstown Chicago White Sox as a scout (1963–64) and coach (1965). In 1966 he returned to managing in the PCL with the St. Louis Cardinals' top affiliate, the Tulsa Oilers.

After one season, Metro resumed his scouting career. Bob Howsam, who owned the Triple-A Denver Bears when Metro managed them as a Tigers' affiliate in 1960–61, had hired Metro for the Cardinals' system at Tulsa in 1966. When Howsam took over as general manager of the Cincinnati Reds in 1967, he brought Metro with him as a top special assignments scout. Then, in 1968, Metro joined the front office of the expansion Kansas City Royals, where he had an active hand in the expansion draft.

He took over as manager when Joe Gordon resigned after only one season at the helm. However, his stint there as manager was shorter than his Cubs tenure, lasting only 52 games (19–33, .365), being replaced by Bob Lemon on June 7.

Metro went back to scouting for the Tigers and the Los Angeles Dodgers. Then followed a coaching assignment with the Oakland Athletics, and in 1984 he returned to the Dodgers as a scout.

After being dismissed by Los Angeles, Metro retired to his Denver ranch.

He died in Buckingham, Virginia, where he lived, on March 18, 2011, from mesothelioma, a type of lung cancer.

== See also ==
- Twin Falls Cowboys

Sporting positions
Preceded by Lou Klein	Chicago Cubs head coach June 5 – September 30, 1962	Succeeded by Bob Kennedy
Preceded by Joe Gordon	Kansas City Royals manager 1970	Succeeded by Bob Lemon
