= Charlie Fox (baseball) =

American baseball player and manager (1921-2004)

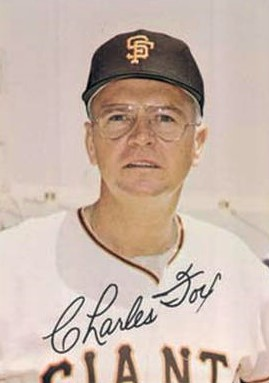
- Catcher / Manager
- Born: October 7, 1921; New York City, New York, U.S.
- Died: February 16, 2004 (aged 82); Stanford, California, U.S.
- Batted: Right Threw: Right

MLB debut
- September 24, 1942, for the New York Giants

Last MLB appearance
- September 26, 1942, for the New York Giants

MLB statistics
- Batting average: .429
- Home runs: 0
- Runs batted in: 1
- Managerial record: 377–371
- Stats at Baseball Reference

Teams
- As player: New York Giants (1942); As manager: San Francisco Giants (1970–1974); Montreal Expos (1976); Chicago Cubs (1983); As coach: San Francisco Giants (1965–1968); New York Yankees (1989)

Charles Francis Fox (October 7, 1921 – February 16, 2004) was an American manager, general manager, scout, coach—and, briefly, a catcher—in Major League Baseball. As manager of the National League West Division champion San Francisco Giants in 1971, he was named "Manager of the Year" by The Sporting News.

== Early career ==
Born in New York City, Fox appeared in only three games as a Major League player—garnering three hits in seven at bats for a career batting average of .429—with the 1942 New York Giants. However, Fox would spend another 53 years at the Major and Minor League level as a player, manager, scout and coach for the Giants, who relocated to San Francisco in 1958.

Fox spent more than a half-century in professional baseball, including stints as manager of the Montreal Expos and Chicago Cubs as well as the Giants. Born in the Bronx, he broke into big-league baseball in an unusual way. "I was 14, selling newspapers near the Polo Grounds with 24 cents in my pocket," he once recalled, "when a couple of tough kids came at me. I put up my dukes, and two Giants coaches saw me handling myself pretty good. They complimented me and asked if I could catch. I lied -- I said I could. They gave me a mitt and told me to help their pitchers in practice. "After a couple of hours, they handed me $5, as much as I made in a month hustling newspapers. That did it. From then on, I dreamed and worked only toward my goal of becoming a Giants catcher." Fox finally made it, late in 1942, for three games, going 3-for-7 at the plate in his only major-league playing action before going into the Navy for three years of service during World War II. According to his honorable discharge, he served from 11/17/1942 through 10/3/1945. During this time, he served at the Naval Torpedo Station in Newport, RI, where he completed 14 weeks of Quartermaster School. He later served aboard the SS Anson Jones and the SS Benjamin Hill and attained the rank of Seaman First Class. His discharge lists his main civilian occupation as "Professional Baseball Player" and his last employer as "New York Giants (Baseball)."

He then began a career as a player-manager of Giants' minor-league clubs, including stops at Triple-A Tacoma and Phoenix. During his time in the minors, Fox helped develop, among others, a young, strapping first baseman named Willie McCovey. "I knew Charlie ever since I signed as a 17-year-old kid -- he was kind of instrumental in the Giants signing me," McCovey said Tuesday. "I met Charlie when he was still playing. ... We all grew together. He coached me on a couple of clubs. He was easy to play for, a fiery guy."

Fox spent eight years as manager of the Giants' Class C St. Cloud Rox team in the Northern League, scouted from 1957 to 1963, then managed the Giants' Triple-A Tacoma affiliate in the Pacific Coast League in 1964 before coming to the Major Leagues as a San Francisco coach under Herman Franks in 1965. He returned to the PCL to pilot the Giants' Phoenix affiliate in 1969–70 until he was summoned to San Francisco on May 24, 1970, to replace Clyde King as the manager of the MLB Giants. The Giants were stalled in fifth place in the NL West at 19–23 (.452), and had just lost a 15-inning game to San Diego, 17–16, the day before. Under Fox, the 1970 Giants recovered to go 14 games over .500 and finish third, 16 games behind Cincinnati.

== Major League managerial career ==
Hired in 1970, Fox led the Giants to the NL West title in 1971, their only title of the decade.

In a year known as “The Year of the Fox", Charlie Fox led a team of aging stars and rising youngsters to a Western Division title with a 90–72 record. The Giants got off to a fast start, winning 37 of their first 51 games, and enjoyed a 10 1/2-game margin over the Los Angeles Dodgers on May 31. The talent of youngsters like outfielders Bobby Bonds, Gary Matthews and Garry Maddox and shortstop Chris Speier melded nicely with the experience of veterans Juan Marichal, Willie McCovey, and Willie Mays. Bonds smashed 33 home runs and 102 RBI. Meanwhile, pitcher Marichal continued his domination over batters, notching 18 wins. In addition, Willie Mays, who was now 40-years old, slugged four home runs in his first four games. He went on to set a National League career record for runs scored in June. Despite such steady play, the team began to wear down near the end of the season. On September 1, San Francisco still held a comfortable, eight-game edge over the Dodgers. Then they withstood their in-state rivals during the pennant stretch. They saw their nine-game lead on September 4 dwindle to one game by the 25th. It wasn't until the final game of the season that the Giants clinched the Division title on Marichal's 5-1 gem over the San Diego Padres.

The Giants salivated at the chance to face the Pittsburgh Pirates in the best-of-five 1971 National League Championship Series. They had beaten the Pirates 9-out-of-12-games and seemed likely candidates to win the pennant. The Giants jumped out of the gate full-steam ahead in the series opener, beating the Pirates, 5–4, in front of 40,977 fans at Candlestick Park. Willie McCovey and Tito Fuentes fueled the attack, ripping two-run homers in the fifth inning. However, the Giants would lose the next three games, as the Pirates would advance to the World Series in four games.

Subsequently, they made a series of bad trades and fell from contention thereafter. On June 27, 1974, after compiling a record of 348–327 (.516), Fox was replaced as manager by former stalwart Giants catcher Wes Westrum.

In 1976, he joined the front office of the Montreal Expos as a special assignment scout and served as the club's "emergency" manager when Karl Kuehl was fired on September 4. After winning only 12 of 34 games to close out the season, Fox was named as the general manager and was later succeeded on the field by Dick Williams. He held the GM title in Montreal through the 1978 season.

Fox, however, was destined to serve another term as an interim manager. In 1983, while working as a special assistant to Chicago Cubs general manager Dallas Green, Fox took over from embattled skipper Lee Elia on August 22 and managed the Cubs for the final 39 games of the season, winning 17 and losing 22. In 1984, he was replaced by Jim Frey. Later on he coached under Green in 1989 with the New York Yankees, and scouted for the Houston Astros.

Fox's career major league managing record was 377–371 (.504).

Fox served in other various capacities, from general manager to scout, with the Expos, Cubs, New York Yankees and Houston Astros.

Fox died at age 82 in Stanford, California, and his remains were interred in Holy Cross Catholic Cemetery, Colma, California.

== Managerial statistics ==
Team	Year	Regular Season				Post Season			
Team	Year	Won	Lost	Win %	Finish	Won	Lost	Win %	Result
SF	1970	67	53	.558	3rd in NL West	–	–	–	–
SF	1971	90	72	.556	1st in NL West	1	3	.250	Lost to Pittsburgh Pirates
SF	1972	69	86	.445	5th in NL West	–	–	–	–
SF	1973	88	74	.543	3rd in NL West	–	–	–	–
SF	1974	34	42	.447	5th in NL West	–	–	–	–
MON	1976	12	22	.353	6th in NL East	–	–	–	–
CHC	1983	17	22	.436	5th in NL East	–	–	–	–
Total		377	371	.504		1	3	.250	–

Sporting positions
Preceded by Jim Fanning	Montreal Expos general manager 1976–1978	Succeeded by John McHale
