= Philip K. Wrigley =

American businessman (1894–1977)

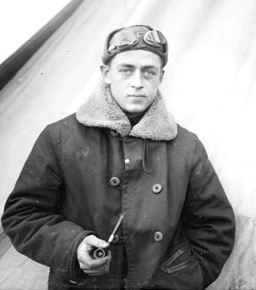
- Wrigley in 1917
- Born: Philip Knight Wrigley; December 5, 1894; Chicago, Illinois, U.S.
- Died: April 12, 1977 (aged 82); Elkhorn, Wisconsin, U.S.
- Education: Phillips Academy; University of Chicago
- Occupations: Chewing gum manufacturer and executive in Major League Baseball
- Children: 2, including William III
- Father: William Wrigley Jr.

Philip Knight Wrigley (December 5, 1894 – April 12, 1977) was an American chewing gum manufacturer and a Major League Baseball executive, inheriting both of those roles as the son of William Wrigley Jr.

== Biography ==
Wrigley was born in Chicago in 1894. He graduated from Phillips Academy in Andover, Massachusetts, in 1914, and briefly attended the University of Chicago. In the early 1930s, Philip founded Wilmington-Catalina Airline, an airline flying from the Port of Los Angeles at Wilmington, California to Santa Catalina Island, in support of his father's resort on that island. His father, William Wrigley Jr., died in 1932, elevating Philip's role in the family business. He presided over the Wm. Wrigley Jr. Company, and also the family hobby, the Chicago Cubs, as owner until his death. He turned over the presidency of his chewing gum company to his son William Wrigley III in 1961, while retaining the presidency of the Cubs.

While the gum industry prospered, the Cubs grew less competitive over the decades. After an appearance in the 1945 World Series, they only had seven winning seasons in the next 32 years, including 16 straight non-winning seasons from 1947 to 1962. They did have a brief flurry of success (although no pennant-winning season) in the late 1960s and early 1970s. Although resisting installing lights at Wrigley Field, in order to donate the light standards to the military during wartime, Wrigley was innovative in other ways. In 1961, he abolished the traditional field manager and coaches structure and instead established a "College of Coaches". This anticipated the specialization of coaches, which later became standard practice. His one mistake, however, was not having a manager. Instead, he opted to have the various coaches as a "head coach." Without firm and consistent leadership, the Cubs continued to languish in the standings, despite having Cubs greats Ernie Banks, Ron Santo, and Billy Williams on the roster. Amid constant ridicule from the media and players, Wrigley dropped the head coach idea and hired Leo Durocher as the Cubs' manager in 1966.

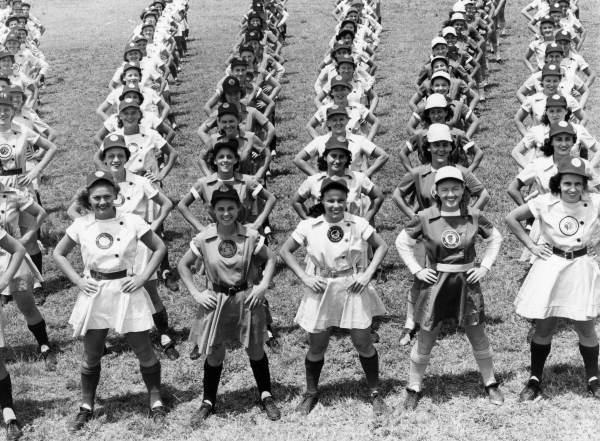
All-American Girls Professional Baseball League members in 1948

During World War II, Wrigley founded the All-American Girls Professional Baseball League (AAGPBL) as a promotional sideline to maintain interest in baseball as the military draft was depleting major-league rosters of first-line players. The AAGPBL was immortalized in the 1992 film, A League of Their Own. In the movie, the character of Walter Harvey, a candy bar mogul, is loosely based on Wrigley. As is his television counterpart in the 2022 series Morris Baker is portrayed by Kevin Dunn.

Like his father, Wrigley was a strong believer in maximizing media coverage. He hired Otis Shepard and Dorothy Shepard to assist him with his advertising needs. Starting in the 1920s, the Cubs' games were covered extensively on the radio, sometimes by competing stations at the same time, for minimal fees. In the post-World War II era, when baseball was booming, Wrigley continued this practice, allowing WGN-TV to carry all the home games as well as a significant number of road games. Some owners were aghast at Wrigley's "giving away the product", but it paid manifold dividends in the long run, as the evolution of WGN-TV into a superstation developed a truly nationwide fan base for the Cubs, resulting in nearly constant sellout crowds at "Beautiful Wrigley Field", regardless of the fortunes of the team at a given time.

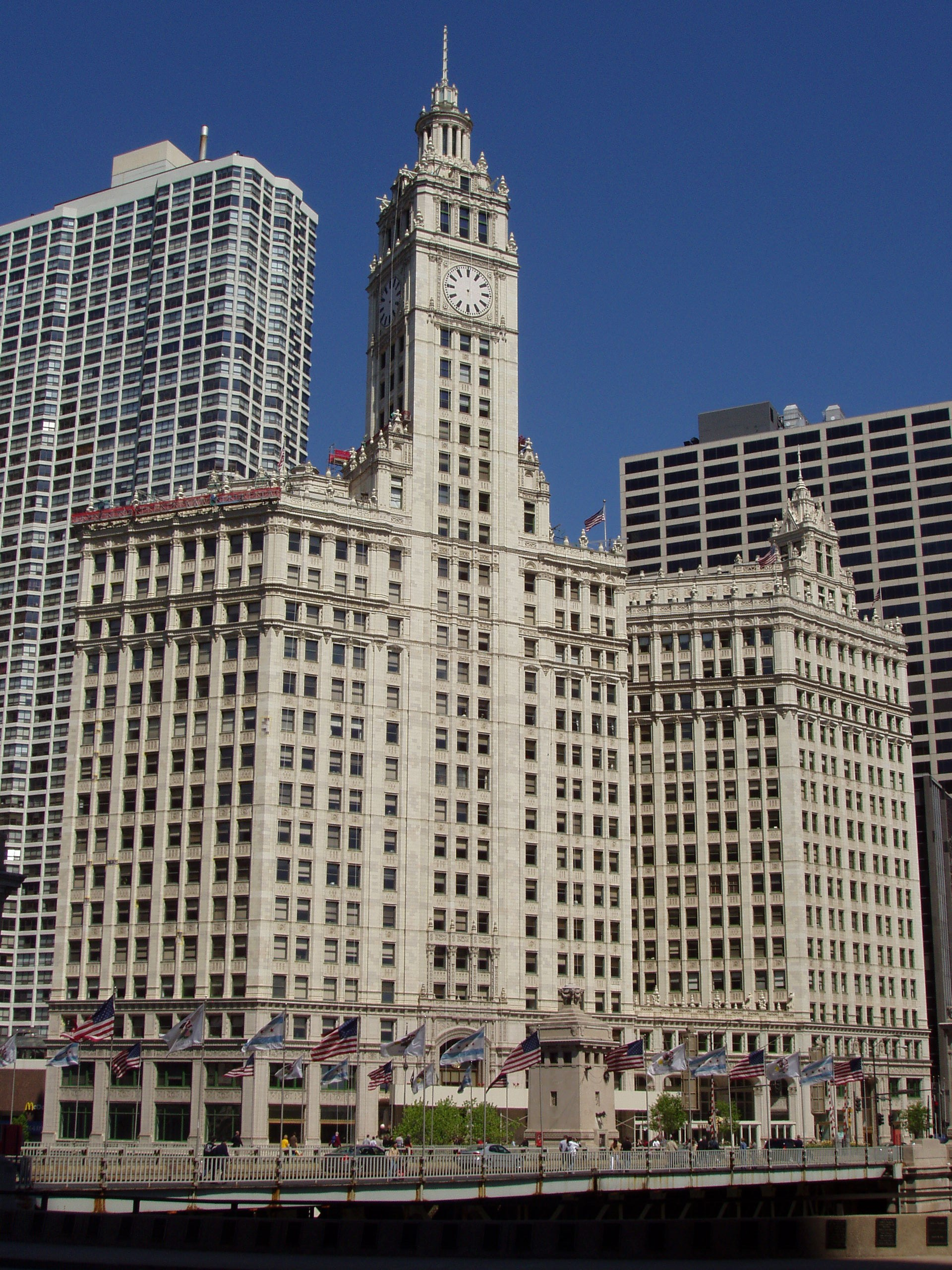
The Wrigley Building in Chicago

Wrigley was a fairly visible presence with the Cubs in his younger years, but was seldom seen attending games during his final few decades of ownership, making his presence known mostly through memos and sometimes full-page newspaper ads. The Sporting News once reported that utility player Pete LaCock—best known for being the son of TV personality Peter Marshall and for his unique sense of humor—had made a trip to the Wrigley Building and asked for an audience with Wrigley. Wrigley asked LaCock what he wanted, and he answered, "Nothing. I just wanted to see if you really exist!"

Continuing the environmental stewardship of his father, Wrigley established the Catalina Island Conservancy in 1972, and donated his family's ownership of most of Santa Catalina Island, 26 miles (42 km) off the coast of Los Angeles, to the conservancy.

Wrigley died on April 12, 1977, of a gastrointestinal hemorrhage; stricken at his resort home in Lake Geneva, Wisconsin, he died at a hospital in Elkhorn, Wisconsin.

After Wrigley died, his son William III became president of the Cubs. Only a few months later, Wrigley's widow, Helen Blanche (née Atwater) Wrigley died, saddling William III with massive estate taxes. William III was forced to sell the Cubs to the Tribune Company in 1981, ending over 60 years of Wrigley association with the team, except for the name of the ballpark itself, which remains Wrigley Field.
