= 1962 Philadelphia Phillies season =

1962 Philadelphia Phillies
- League: National League
- Ballpark: Connie Mack Stadium
- City: Philadelphia
- Record: 81–80 (.503)
- League place: 7th
- Owners: R. R. M. Carpenter, Jr.
- General managers: John J. Quinn
- Managers: Gene Mauch
- Television: WFIL
- Radio: WFIL (By Saam, Claude Haring, Frank Sims)

The 1962 Philadelphia Phillies season was the 80th season for the National League franchise. The Phillies finished the season in seventh place in the newly expanded National League with a record of 81–80, a dramatic improvement of 30 1/2 games over the 47–107 mark of the previous season. Gene Mauch managed the Phillies, who played their home games at Connie Mack Stadium.

== Offseason ==
- October 10, 1961: 1961 Major League Baseball expansion draft
  - Choo-Choo Coleman was drafted from the Phillies by the New York Mets.
  - Bob Smith was drafted from the Phillies by the New York Mets.
- November 28, 1961: Charley Smith and John Buzhardt were traded by the Phillies to the Chicago White Sox for Roy Sievers.
- Prior to 1962 season: Rubén Gómez was acquired from the Phillies by the Cleveland Indians.

== Preseason ==
The Phillies held spring training in Clearwater, Florida where the team had trained since 1947, and played exhibition games at Jack Russell Stadium.

While the Phillies' White players and club officials had been welcome to stay at Clearwater's Jack Tar Harrison Hotel, the Hotel refused service to the team's Black players who boarded in private homes. On March 10, 1962, the Phillies moved their entire team including White and Black players into the Rocky Point Motel located between Clearwater and Tampa.

The Phillies had sold pitcher Robin Roberts to the New York Yankees shortly after the 1961 season. On February 6, 1962, the Phillies announced that Roberts' uniform number 36 would be retired by the team on March 21, 1962, when the Yankees would visit Clearwater to play the Phillies in a spring training game. It was the first uniform number to be retired by the organization and only the second time (after the Yankees retired Babe Ruth's number 3) that a uniform number was retired while the player was still active. Roberts started for the Yankees in the spring game, gave up four runs in three innings, and was the winning pitcher as the Yankees won 13–10.

== Regular season ==
=== 'Phillies Special' Rail Accident ===
The Pennsylvania Railroad ran a line from Harrisburg to Philadelphia that often carried fans from central Pennsylvania to games at Connie Mack Stadium. It was advertised on Phillies radio broadcasts as the "Phillies Special". At 5:07 PM on July 28, 1962, en route to the Phillies 8:05 PM game against the Pittsburgh Pirates, four cars of Pennsylvania Railroad's Extra 4878 East derailed 3.7 miles east of Harrisburg in Steelton, Pennsylvania. Three of the cars toppled down a 30-foot embankment to the Susquehanna River. There were 19 fatalities and 119 were injured. The following day, on Sunday, July 29, 1962, at Connie Mack, the Phillies honored the victims with a moment of silence prior to the game's start. The Pennsylvania Railroad would later report the track was out of alignment.

=== Season standings ===
National League
Team	W	L	Pct.	GB	Home	Road
San Francisco Giants	103	62	.624	—	61‍–‍21	42‍–‍41
Los Angeles Dodgers	102	63	.618	1	54‍–‍29	48‍–‍34
Cincinnati Reds	98	64	.605	3½	58‍–‍23	40‍–‍41
Pittsburgh Pirates	93	68	.578	8	51‍–‍30	42‍–‍38
Milwaukee Braves	86	76	.531	15½	49‍–‍32	37‍–‍44
St. Louis Cardinals	84	78	.519	17½	44‍–‍37	40‍–‍41
Philadelphia Phillies	81	80	.503	20	46‍–‍34	35‍–‍46
Houston Colt .45s	64	96	.400	36½	32‍–‍48	32‍–‍48
Chicago Cubs	59	103	.364	42½	32‍–‍49	27‍–‍54
New York Mets	40	120	.250	60½	22‍–‍58	18‍–‍62

=== Record vs. opponents ===
1962 National League record Sources:
Team	CHC	CIN	HOU	LAD	MIL	NYM	PHI	PIT	SF	STL
Chicago	—	4–14	7–11	4–14	8–10	9–9	10–8	4–14	6–12	7–11
Cincinnati	14–4	—	13–5	9–9	13–5	13–5	8–10	13–5	7–11	8–10
Houston	11–7	5–13	—	6–12	7–11	13–3–1	1–17	5–13	7–11	9–9–1
Los Angeles	14–4	9–9	12–6	—	10–8	16–2	14–4	10–8	10–11	7–11
Milwaukee	10–8	5–13	11–7	8–10	—	12–6	11–7	10–8	7–11	12–6
New York	9–9	5–13	3–13–1	2–16	6–12	—	4–14	2–16	4–14	5–13
Philadelphia	8–10	10–8	17–1	4–14	7–11	14–4	—	7–10	5–13	9–9
Pittsburgh	14–4	5–13	13–5	8–10	8–10	16–2	10–7	—	7–11	12–6
San Francisco	12–6	11–7	11–7	11–10	11–7	14–4	13–5	11–7	—	9–9
St. Louis	11–7	10–8	9–9–1	11–7	6–12	13–5	9–9	6–12	9–9	—

=== Opening Day lineup ===
Tony Taylor, 2B
Johnny Callison, RF
Tony González, CF
Roy Sievers, 1B
Wes Covington, LF
Don Demeter, 3B
Clay Dalrymple, C
Rubén Amaro, SS
Art Mahaffey, P

=== Notable transactions ===
- September 12, 1962: Johnny Briggs was signed as an amateur free agent by the Phillies.

=== Game log ===
Legend
	Phillies win
	Phillies loss
	Postponement
**Bold**	Phillies team member

1962 Game Log
Overall Record: 81–80
April (8–9)

#	Date	Opponent	Score	Win	Loss	Save	Attendance	Record
1	April 9	@ Reds	12–4	**Art Mahaffey** (1–0)	Joey Jay (0–1)	None	28,506	1–0
2	April 10	@ Pirates	0–6	Bob Friend (1–0)	**Jim Owens** (0–1)	None	28,813	1–1
–	April 11	@ Pirates	Postponed (rain); Makeup: July 5					
3	April 13	Colt .45s	3–2	**Jack Hamilton** (1–0)	Turk Farrell (0–1)	None	12,633	2–1
4	April 14	Colt .45s	3–0	**Art Mahaffey** (2–0)	Ken Johnson (0–1)	None	2,732	3–1
–	April 15 (1)	Colt .45s	Postponed (rain); Makeup: June 26 as a traditional double-header					
–	April 15 (2)	Colt .45s	Postponed (rain); Makeup: July 11					
5	April 16	Cardinals	6–12	Ernie Broglio (1–0)	**Don Ferrarese** (0–1)	None	3,895	3–2
–	April 17	Cardinals	Postponed (cold); Makeup: June 22 as a traditional double-header					
6	April 18	Pirates	3–4	Earl Francis (1–0)	**Jack Hamilton** (1–1)	None	7,284	3–3
7	April 19	Pirates	3–6	Al McBean (1–0)	**Art Mahaffey** (2–1)	Jack Lamabe (1)	8,427	3–4
8	April 21	@ Colt .45s	3–1	**Cal McLish** (1–0)	Ken Johnson (0–2)	**Jack Baldschun** (1)	21,841	4–4
9	April 22	@ Colt .45s	4–3	**Jim Owens** (1–1)	Dave Giusti (0–1)	**Jack Baldschun** (2)	13,130	5–4
–	April 23	@ Colt .45s	Postponed (wet grounds); Makeup: July 17 as a traditional double-header					
10	April 24	@ Braves	1–2	Warren Spahn (2–2)	**Art Mahaffey** (2–2)	None	6,898	5–5
11	April 25	@ Braves	2–7	Ron Piché (1–0)	**Chris Short** (0–1)	None	7,306	5–6
12	April 26	@ Braves	4–10	Bob Hendley (2–1)	**Jack Hamilton** (1–2)	Hank Fischer (1)	6,007	5–7
13	April 27	@ Mets	11–9	**Cal McLish** (2–0)	Roger Craig (0–3)	**Jack Baldschun** (3)	9,043	6–7
14	April 28	@ Mets	6–8	Roger Craig (1–3)	**Frank Sullivan** (0–1)	None	10,492	6–8
15	April 29 (1)	@ Mets	0–8	Al Jackson (1–2)	**Art Mahaffey** (2–3)	None	see 2nd game	6–9
16	April 29 (2)	@ Mets	10–2	**Bobby Locke** (1–0)	Sherman Jones (0–4)	**Jack Baldschun** (4)	19,925	7–9
17	April 30	Braves	6–4	**Jack Hamilton** (2–2)	Warren Spahn (2–3)	**Jack Baldschun** (5)	3,931	8–9

May (9–19)

#	Date	Opponent	Score	Win	Loss	Save	Attendance	Record
–	May 1	Braves	Postponed (cold weather, wet grounds); Makeup: July 20 (22) as a traditional double-header					
–	May 2	Braves	Postponed (cold weather, rain); Makeup: July 22 (20) as a traditional double-header					
18	May 3	Braves	9–8	**Jack Baldschun** (1–0)	Hank Fischer (0–1)	None	9,983	9–9
19	May 4	Mets	6–5	**Dallas Green** (1–0)	Ken MacKenzie (0–1)	None	16,393	10–9
20	May 5	Mets	2–1	**Cal McLish** (3–0)	Al Jackson (1–3)	**Jack Baldschun** (6)	7,993	11–9
21	May 6 (1)	Mets	5–7 (12)	Craig Anderson (1–1)	**Jack Baldschun** (1–1)	Roger Craig (1)	28,215	11–10
–	May 6 (2)	Mets	Postponed (Sunday curfew); Makeup: June 6 as a traditional double-header					
22	May 8	@ Reds	6–4	**Chris Short** (1–1)	Jim O'Toole (2–4)	**Jack Baldschun** (7)	5,134	12–10
23	May 9	@ Reds	4–7	Bob Purkey (5–0)	**Art Mahaffey** (2–4)	None	3,304	12–11
24	May 11	@ Cubs	12–2	**Jack Hamilton** (3–2)	Dick Ellsworth (2–4)	None	1,004	13–11
25	May 12	@ Cubs	8–9	Don Elston (2–0)	**Jack Baldschun** (1–2)	None	2,668	13–12
26	May 13 (1)	@ Cubs	7–8	Barney Schultz (2–1)	**Jack Baldschun** (1–3)	None	see 2nd game	13–13
27	May 13 (2)	@ Cubs	5–8	Barney Schultz (3–1)	**Chris Short** (1–2)	Dick Ellsworth (1)	4,927	13–14
28	May 15	Reds	2–3	Joey Jay (5–3)	**Art Mahaffey** (2–5)	Ted Wills (1)	8,177	13–15
29	May 16	Reds	5–6	Jim Brosnan (1–1)	**Frank Sullivan** (0–2)	None	5,350	13–16
30	May 17	Reds	9–6	**Cal McLish** (4–0)	Jim O'Toole (3–5)	**Chris Short** (1)	8,674	14–16
31	May 18	Cubs	8–11	Dick Ellsworth (3–4)	**Jack Baldschun** (1–4)	None	8,425	14–17
32	May 19	Cubs	7–5	**Art Mahaffey** (3–5)	Glen Hobbie (0–5)	None	3,054	15–17
33	May 20 (1)	Cubs	4–6	Cal Koonce (2–0)	**Jim Owens** (1–2)	Bob Anderson (2)	see 2nd game	15–18
34	May 20 (2)	Cubs	2–11	Bob Buhl (2–2)	**Jack Hamilton** (3–3)	None	9,522	15–19
35	May 21	@ Cardinals	1–4	Ray Washburn (3–0)	**Dennis Bennett** (0–1)	Bobby Shantz (1)	6,956	15–20
36	May 22	@ Cardinals	2–6	Bob Gibson (6–2)	**Paul Brown** (0–1)	None	7,270	15–21
37	May 23	@ Giants	10–7	**Art Mahaffey** (4–5)	Mike McCormick (1–2)	**Jack Baldschun** (8)	7,314	16–21
38	May 24	@ Giants	4–7	Stu Miller (2–1)	**Cal McLish** (4–1)	None	5,680	16–22
39	May 25	@ Giants	7–10	Billy Pierce (7–0)	**Jack Hamilton** (3–4)	Stu Miller (4)	11,538	16–23
40	May 26	@ Dodgers	3–6	Sandy Koufax (6–2)	**Dallas Green** (1–1)	None	18,071	16–24
41	May 27 (1)	@ Dodgers	2–5	Stan Williams (4–1)	**Paul Brown** (0–2)	Ron Perranoski (3)	see 2nd game	16–25
42	May 27 (2)	@ Dodgers	1–2	Don Drysdale (7–3)	**Art Mahaffey** (4–6)	None	34,378	16–26
43	May 30 (1)	Giants	3–4 (12)	Stu Miller (3–1)	**Chris Short** (1–3)	None	see 2nd game	16–27
44	May 30 (2)	Giants	2–5	Mike McCormick (2–2)	**Jack Hamilton** (3–5)	Stu Miller (7)	29,739	16–28
45	May 31	Giants	2–1	**Art Mahaffey** (5–6)	Billy O'Dell (5–3)	None	9,393	17–28

June (17–13)

#	Date	Opponent	Score	Win	Loss	Save	Attendance	Record
46	June 1 (1)	Dodgers	4–11	Stan Williams (5–1)	**Paul Brown** (0–3)	Ron Perranoski (5)	see 2nd game	17–29
47	June 1 (2)	Dodgers	5–8	Don Drysdale (8–3)	**Dallas Green** (1–2)	Larry Sherry (3)	24,799	17–30
48	June 2	Dodgers	7–0	**Dennis Bennett** (1–1)	Phil Ortega (0–1)	None	13,141	18–30
49	June 3	Dodgers	7–5	**Chris Short** (2–3)	Johnny Podres (3–4)	**Paul Brown** (1)	9,931	19–30
50	June 4	Dodgers	3–6	Sandy Koufax (8–2)	**Art Mahaffey** (5–7)	None	15,163	19–31
–	June 5	Mets	Postponed (rain); Makeup: August 28 as a traditional double-header					
51	June 6 (1)	Mets	2–0	**Cal McLish** (5–1)	Roger Craig (2–8)	None	see 2nd game	20–31
52	June 6 (2)	Mets	2–1	**Art Mahaffey** (6–7)	Al Jackson (2–7)	None	8,681	21–31
53	June 8	@ Reds	10–3	**Dennis Bennett** (2–1)	Johnny Klippstein (1–1)	None	16,991	22–31
54	June 9	@ Reds	1–5	Bob Purkey (10–1)	**Paul Brown** (0–4)	Bill Henry (4)	6,797	22–32
55	June 10 (1)	@ Reds	7–5	**Jack Baldschun** (2–4)	Joey Jay (8–6)	None	see 2nd game	23–32
56	June 10 (2)	@ Reds	2–9	Jim Maloney (1–0)	**Art Mahaffey** (6–8)	Jim Brosnan (4)	17,471	23–33
57	June 11	@ Cardinals	8–5	**Jack Hamilton** (4–5)	Curt Simmons (6–3)	**Dallas Green** (1)	6,954	24–33
58	June 12	@ Cardinals	2–3	Don Ferrarese (1–2)	**Paul Brown** (0–5)	None	8,092	24–34
59	June 13	@ Cardinals	1–6	Bob Gibson (8–4)	**Dennis Bennett** (2–2)	None	10,933	24–35
60	June 15	Reds	13–8	**Art Mahaffey** (7–8)	Jim Maloney (1–1)	**Chris Short** (2)	15,326	25–35
61	June 16	Reds	4–3	**Chris Short** (3–3)	Bill Henry (2–1)	None	13,288	26–35
62	June 17	Reds	7–2	**Jack Baldschun** (3–4)	Jim O'Toole (4–8)	None	7,936	27–35
63	June 19	Cubs	5–9	Dave Gerard (2–0)	**Chris Short** (3–4)	None	6,464	27–36
–	June 20	Cubs	Postponed (rain); Makeup: September 19 as a traditional double-header					
64	June 21	Cubs	3–0	**Art Mahaffey** (8–8)	Dick Ellsworth (4–10)	None	7,533	28–36
65	June 22 (1)	Cardinals	3–7	Larry Jackson (6–7)	**Paul Brown** (0–6)	Lindy McDaniel (4)	see 2nd game	28–37
66	June 22 (2)	Cardinals	11–3	**Jim Owens** (2–2)	Ernie Broglio (2–3)	None	27,069	29–37
67	June 23	Cardinals	1–9	Bob Gibson (9–5)	**Bill Smith** (0–1)	None	5,893	29–38
68	June 24 (1)	Cardinals	3–1	**Chris Short** (4–4)	Ray Sadecki (4–4)	None	see 2nd game	30–38
69	June 24 (2)	Cardinals	1–5	Curt Simmons (7–4)	**Dennis Bennett** (2–3)	Lindy McDaniel (5)	20,561	30–39
70	June 25	Colt .45s	4–3	**Dallas Green** (2–2)	Hal Woodeshick (2–5)	None	8,087	31–39
71	June 26 (1)	Colt .45s	2–0	**Jack Hamilton** (5–5)	Turk Farrell (5–8)	None	see 2nd game	32–39
72	June 26 (2)	Colt .45s	6–4	**Art Mahaffey** (9–8)	Jim Golden (5–5)	None	18,707	33–39
73	June 28	@ Giants	7–2	**Bill Smith** (1–1)	Juan Marichal (11–5)	None	7,174	34–39
74	June 29	@ Giants	3–4 (12)	Billy O'Dell (9–6)	**Jack Baldschun** (3–5)	None	11,088	34–40
75	June 30	@ Giants	3–8	Bobby Bolin (2–0)	**Cal McLish** (5–2)	Stu Miller (10)	11,716	34–41

July (15–17)

#	Date	Opponent	Score	Win	Loss	Save	Attendance	Record
76	July 1	@ Giants	4–5	Don Larsen (4–1)	**Art Mahaffey** (9–9)	Stu Miller (11)	17,612	34–42
77	July 2 (1)	@ Dodgers	1–5	Johnny Podres (4–6)	**Jack Hamilton** (5–6)	Larry Sherry (6)	see 2nd game	34–43
78	July 2 (2)	@ Dodgers	0–4	Stan Williams (7–4)	**Bill Smith** (1–2)	None	28,316	34–44
79	July 4 (1)	@ Dodgers	1–16	Sandy Koufax (12–4)	**Chris Short** (4–5)	None	see 2nd game	34–45
80	July 4 (2)	@ Dodgers	3–7	Joe Moeller (6–5)	**Dennis Bennett** (2–4)	Ed Roebuck (5)	39,322	34–46
81	July 5	@ Pirates	0–5	Al McBean (8–5)	**Jim Owens** (2–3)	None	13,623	34–47
82	July 6	@ Pirates	6–2	**Art Mahaffey** (10–9)	Bob Friend (8–9)	None	15,836	35–47
83	July 7	@ Pirates	4–6	Roy Face (5–1)	**Chris Short** (4–6)	None	8,781	35–48
84	July 8 (1)	@ Pirates	8–4	**Jack Baldschun** (4–5)	Vern Law (7–4)	None	see 2nd game	36–48
85	July 8 (2)	@ Pirates	5–6	Tom Sturdivant (4–3)	**Bill Smith** (1–3)	Roy Face (17)	16,147	36–49
–	July 10	**1962 Major League Baseball All-Star Game at District of Columbia Stadium in Washington**						
86	July 11	Colt .45s	6–1	**Art Mahaffey** (11–9)	Hal Woodeshick (3–7)	None	3,441	37–49
87	July 12	Giants	3–5	Jack Sanford (10–6)	**Jack Hamilton** (5–7)	Stu Miller (13)	17,151	37–50
88	July 13	Giants	3–2	**Dennis Bennett** (3–4)	Billy O'Dell (10–8)	None	18,693	38–50
89	July 14	Giants	6–5 (10)	**Jack Baldschun** (5–5)	Stu Miller (4–5)	None	7,716	39–50
90	July 15 (1)	Dodgers	1–9	Johnny Podres (5–7)	**Bill Smith** (1–4)	None	see 2nd game	39–51
91	July 15 (2)	Dodgers	2–1	**Art Mahaffey** (12–9)	Phil Ortega (0–2)	None	34,907	40–51
92	July 17 (1)	@ Colt .45s	3–0	**Jack Hamilton** (6–7)	Russ Kemmerer (2–2)	**Jack Baldschun** (9)	see 2nd game	41–51
93	July 17 (2)	@ Colt .45s	8–2	**Cal McLish** (6–2)	Turk Farrell (5–12)	**Dennis Bennett** (1)	8,115	42–51
94	July 18	@ Colt .45s	6–2	**Dallas Green** (3–2)	Bob Bruce (6–4)	None	5,140	43–51
95	July 19	@ Colt .45s	6–2	**Chris Short** (5–6)	Hal Woodeshick (4–8)	**Jack Baldschun** (10)	5,017	44–51
96	July 20 (1)	Braves	5–7	Jack Curtis (3–4)	**Dennis Bennett** (3–5)	None	see 2nd game	44–52
97	July 20 (2)	Braves	3–2	**Art Mahaffey** (13–9)	Bob Hendley (6–7)	None	24,353	45–52
98	July 21	Braves	1–8	Warren Spahn (9–11)	**Jack Hamilton** (6–8)	None	11,689	45–53
99	July 22 (1)	Braves	10–11	Don Nottebart (1–2)	**Jack Baldschun** (5–6)	None	see 2nd game	45–54
100	July 22 (2)	Braves	2–5	Denny Lemaster (1–1)	**Dallas Green** (3–3)	Claude Raymond (3)	11,010	45–55
101	July 23	@ Cubs	5–3	**Jack Baldschun** (6–6)	Don Elston (3–6)	**Jack Hamilton** (1)	6,699	46–55
102	July 24	@ Cubs	3–5	Glen Hobbie (3–9)	**Bill Smith** (1–5)	Don Cardwell (1)	5,403	46–56
103	July 25	@ Cubs	2–5	Bob Buhl (7–8)	**Dennis Bennett** (3–6)	Dave Gerard (3)	6,292	46–57
104	July 27 (1)	Pirates	5–3	**Dallas Green** (4–3)	Harvey Haddix (7–5)	**Chris Short** (3)	see 2nd game	47–57
105	July 27 (2)	Pirates	1–4	Bob Friend (11–10)	**Jack Hamilton** (6–9)	Roy Face (18)		47–58
106	July 28	Pirates	9–2	**Art Mahaffey** (14–9)	Earl Francis (5–7)	None	12,450	48–58
107	July 29	Pirates	8–1	**Cal McLish** (7–2)	Al McBean (10–7)	None	8,502	49–58
–	July 30	**1962 Major League Baseball All-Star Game at Wrigley Field in Chicago**						

August (17–15)

#	Date	Opponent	Score	Win	Loss	Save	Attendance	Record
108	August 1	@ Mets	11–9	**Dennis Bennett** (4–6)	Al Jackson (5–13)	**Jack Baldschun** (11)	8,681	50–58
109	August 2	@ Mets	9–4	**Art Mahaffey** (15–9)	Craig Anderson (3–12)	None	6,042	51–58
–	August 3	@ Braves	Postponed (rain); Makeup: August 4 as a traditional double-header					
110	August 4 (1)	@ Braves	2–6	Bob Hendley (8–7)	**Dallas Green** (4–4)	None	see 2nd game	51–59
111	August 4 (2)	@ Braves	3–7	Claude Raymond (4–2)	**Jack Baldschun** (6–7)	None	9,474	51–60
112	August 5	@ Braves	1–8	Warren Spahn (11–11)	**Dennis Bennett** (4–7)	None	11,664	51–61
113	August 6	@ Giants	2–9	Billy Pierce (10–3)	**Dallas Green** (4–5)	None	6,222	51–62
114	August 7	@ Giants	2–4	Juan Marichal (14–8)	**Art Mahaffey** (15–10)	None	8,531	51–63
115	August 8	@ Dodgers	1–3	Stan Williams (11–7)	**Jack Hamilton** (6–10)	None	34,729	51–64
116	August 9	@ Dodgers	3–8	Ed Roebuck (8–0)	**Dennis Bennett** (4–8)	Ron Perranoski (12)	32,226	51–65
117	August 10	@ Cardinals	4–7	Bobby Shantz (4–2)	**Chris Short** (5–7)	None	13,408	51–66
118	August 11	@ Cardinals	11–3	**Art Mahaffey** (16–10)	Larry Jackson (9–10)	None	9,216	52–66
119	August 12 (1)	@ Cardinals	7–3	**Cal McLish** (8–2)	Ernie Broglio (9–5)	None	see 2nd game	53–66
120	August 12 (2)	@ Cardinals	9–7	**Dallas Green** (5–5)	Lindy McDaniel (2–7)	**Dennis Bennett** (2)	17,088	54–66
121	August 14	@ Mets	3–1 (15)	**Jack Baldschun** (7–7)	Al Jackson (6–15)	None	5,351	55–66
122	August 15 (1)	@ Mets	9–3	**Dennis Bennett** (5–8)	Bob L. Miller (0–9)	**Cal McLish** (1)	see 2nd game	56–66
123	August 15 (2)	@ Mets	8–7 (13)	**Chris Short** (6–7)	Bob Moorhead (0–2)	None	9,573	57–66
124	August 17	@ Pirates	1–9	Harvey Haddix (8–5)	**Jack Hamilton** (6–11)	None	13,713	57–67
125	August 18	@ Pirates	2–5	Tom Sturdivant (5–3)	**Cal McLish** (8–3)	Roy Face (22)	10,611	57–68
126	August 19	@ Pirates	3–2	**Chris Short** (7–7)	Roy Face (8–4)	**Jack Baldschun** (12)	15,680	58–68
127	August 20 (1)	Colt .45s	7–1	**Dallas Green** (6–5)	Turk Farrell (8–16)	None	14,601	59–68
–	August 20 (2)	Colt .45s	Postponed (rain); Makeup: August 21 as a traditional double-header					
128	August 21 (1)	Colt .45s	5–3	**Art Mahaffey** (17–10)	Bob Bruce (7–8)	None	see 2nd game	60–68
129	August 21 (2)	Colt .45s	7–4	**Jack Hamilton** (7–11)	Jim Golden (5–11)	None	5,489	61–68
130	August 22	Dodgers	5–1	**Chris Short** (8–7)	Pete Richert (2–3)	None	24,091	62–68
131	August 23	Dodgers	2–4	Johnny Podres (10–10)	**Dennis Bennett** (5–9)	Ron Perranoski (15)	25,828	62–69
132	August 24	Giants	0–6	Billy O'Dell (15–11)	**Cal McLish** (8–4)	None	19,454	62–70
133	August 25	Giants	1–6	Billy Pierce (12–4)	**Dallas Green** (6–6)	None	16,738	62–71
134	August 26	Giants	4–7	Jack Sanford (18–6)	**Art Mahaffey** (17–11)	Bobby Bolin (4)	14,855	62–72
135	August 28 (1)	Mets	0–2	Al Jackson (7–17)	**Chris Short** (8–8)	None	see 2nd game	62–73
136	August 28 (2)	Mets	10–1	**Dennis Bennett** (6–9)	Bob L. Miller (0–11)	None	6,572	63–73
137	August 29	Mets	3–2 (10)	**Cal McLish** (9–4)	Jay Hook (8–15)	None	4,822	64–73
138	August 30	Mets	8–7	**Jack Baldschun** (8–7)	Bob G. Miller (2–2)	None	5,722	65–73
139	August 31	Pirates	3–2 (11)	**Jack Baldschun** (9–7)	Earl Francis (6–8)	None	8,191	66–73

September (15–7)

#	Date	Opponent	Score	Win	Loss	Save	Attendance	Record
140	September 1	Pirates	6–7	Tom Sturdivant (8–3)	**Jim Owens** (2–4)	Roy Face (27)	8,297	66–74
–	September 2	Pirates	Cancelled (rain); Was not rescheduled					
141	September 3 (1)	@ Colt .45s	3–2	**Art Mahaffey** (18–11)	Turk Farrell (9–18)	None	see 2nd game	67–74
142	September 3 (2)	@ Colt .45s	5–3	**Jack Hamilton** (8–11)	Hal Woodeshick (5–16)	**Dennis Bennett** (3)	17,302	68–74
143	September 4	@ Colt .45s	1–4	Bob Bruce (9–8)	**Cal McLish** (9–5)	None	4,537	68–75
144	September 7	@ Braves	4–3 (10)	**Jack Baldschun** (10–7)	Claude Raymond (5–4)	None	6,571	69–75
145	September 8	@ Braves	6–4	**Cal McLish** (10–5)	Bob Hendley (10–12)	**Jack Hamilton** (2)	6,099	70–75
146	September 9	@ Braves	4–2	**Chris Short** (9–8)	Warren Spahn (14–13)	**Jack Baldschun** (13)	10,238	71–75
147	September 12	Braves	0–9	Denny Lemaster (2–4)	**Art Mahaffey** (18–12)	None	5,783	71–76
148	September 13	Braves	2–1	**Chris Short** (10–8)	Warren Spahn (14–14)	None	4,013	72–76
149	September 14	Cardinals	2–1	**Dennis Bennett** (7–9)	Lindy McDaniel (3–10)	None	7,262	73–76
150	September 15	Cardinals	5–4	**Jack Baldschun** (11–7)	Bobby Shantz (6–4)	None	4,503	74–76
151	September 16	Cardinals	3–1	**Art Mahaffey** (19–12)	Bob Gibson (15–13)	None	6,388	75–76
152	September 19 (1)	Cubs	4–3 (6)	**Chris Short** (11–8)	Morrie Steevens (0–1)	None	3,465	76–76
–	September 19 (2)	Cubs	Postponed (rain); Makeup: September 20 as a traditional double-header					
153	September 20 (1)	Cubs	3–1	**Dennis Bennett** (8–9)	Bob Buhl (11–13)	None	see 2nd game	77–76
154	September 20 (2)	Cubs	1–4	Cal Koonce (10–9)	**Jack Hamilton** (8–12)	Freddie Burdette (1)	2,508	77–77
155	September 21	Reds	8–6	**Jack Baldschun** (12–7)	Joey Jay (21–14)	None	5,726	78–77
156	September 22	Reds	2–1	**Cal McLish** (11–5)	Johnny Klippstein (7–5)	None	3,837	79–77
157	September 23	Reds	2–4 (10)	Dave Sisler (4–3)	**Art Mahaffey** (19–13)	None	6,554	79–78
158	September 26	@ Cubs	6–5	**Jack Hamilton** (9–12)	Bob Buhl (11–14)	None	930	80–78
159	September 27	@ Cubs	7–0	**Dennis Bennett** (9–9)	Cal Koonce (10–10)	None	617	81–78
160	September 28	@ Reds	3–7	Sammy Ellis (2–2)	**Chris Short** (11–9)	Bill Henry (11)	4,494	81–79
161	September 30	@ Reds	0–4	John Tsitouris (1–0)	**Art Mahaffey** (19–14)	None	10,942	81–80

=== Roster ===
1962 Philadelphia Phillies
**Roster**
**Pitchers**: 27 Jack Baldschun; 23 Dennis Bennett; 29 John Boozer; 23,39 Paul Brown; 14 Don Ferrarese; 46 Dallas Green; 48 Jack Hamilton; 50 Ed Keegan; 26 Bobby Locke; 28 Art Mahaffey; 26 Cal McLish; 49 Jim Owens; 41 Chris Short; 47 Bill Smith; 18 Frank Sullivan	**Catchers**: 11 Clay Dalrymple; 10 Bob Oldis; 9 Sammy White; **Infielders**: 20 Rubén Amaro; 15 Billy Consolo; 24 Don Demeter; 32 Billy Klaus; 19 Bobby Malkmus; 31 Mel Roach; 5 Roy Sievers; 8 Tony Taylor; 16 Frank Torre; 42 Bobby Wine	**Outfielders**: 6 Johnny Callison; 43 Wes Covington; 17 Jacke Davis; 22,25 Tony González; 21 John Herrnstein; 14,7 Ted Savage; **Other batters**: 17 Jimmie Coker	**Manager**: 4 Gene Mauch; **Coaches**: 3 Peanuts Lowrey; 1 Al Vincent; 2 Al Widmar

== Player stats ==
=== Batting ===
==== Starters by position ====
Note: Pos = Position; G = Games played; AB = At bats; H = Hits; Avg. = Batting average; HR = Home runs; RBI = Runs batted in

Pos	Player	G	AB	H	Avg.	HR	RBI
C	Clay Dalrymple	123	370	102	.276	11	54
1B	Roy Sievers	144	477	125	.262	21	80
2B	Tony Taylor	152	625	162	.259	7	43
SS	Bobby Wine	112	311	76	.244	4	25
3B	Don Demeter	153	550	169	.307	29	107
LF	Ted Savage	127	335	89	.266	7	39
CF	Tony González	118	437	132	.302	20	63
RF	Johnny Callison	157	603	181	.300	23	83

==== Other batters ====
Note: G = Games played; AB = At bats; H = Hits; Avg. = Batting average; HR = Home runs; RBI = Runs batted in

Player	G	AB	H	Avg.	HR	RBI
Wes Covington	116	304	86	.283	9	44
Billy Klaus	102	248	51	.206	4	20
Rubén Amaro Sr.	79	226	55	.243	0	19
Frank Torre	108	168	52	.310	0	20
Mel Roach	65	105	20	.190	0	8
Sammy White	41	97	21	.216	2	12
Bob Oldis	38	80	21	.263	1	10
Jacke Davis	48	75	16	.213	1	6
John Herrnstein	6	5	1	.200	0	1
Bobby Malkmus	8	5	1	.200	0	0
Billy Consolo	13	5	2	.400	0	0
Jimmie Coker	5	3	0	.000	0	1

=== Pitching ===
==== Starting pitchers ====
Note: G = Games pitched; IP = Innings pitched; W = Wins; L = Losses; ERA = Earned run average; SO = Strikeouts

Player	G	IP	W	L	ERA	SO
Art Mahaffey	41	274.0	19	14	3.94	177
Dennis Bennett	31	174.2	9	9	3.81	149
Cal McLish	32	154.2	11	5	4.25	71

==== Other pitchers ====
Note: G = Games pitched; IP = Innings pitched; W = Wins; L = Losses; ERA = Earned run average; SO = Strikeouts

Player	G	IP	W	L	ERA	SO
Jack Hamilton	41	182.0	9	12	5.09	101
Chris Short	47	142.0	11	9	3.42	91
Dallas Green	37	129.1	6	6	3.83	58
Jim Owens	23	69.2	2	4	6.33	21
Paul Brown	23	63.2	0	6	5.94	29
Bill Smith	24	50.1	1	5	4.29	26

==== Relief pitchers ====
Note: G = Games pitched; W = Wins; L = Losses; SV = Saves; ERA = Earned run average; SO = Strikeouts

Player	G	W	L	SV	ERA	SO
Jack Baldschun	67	12	7	13	2.96	95
Frank Sullivan	19	0	2	0	6.26	12
John Boozer	9	0	0	0	5.75	13
Bobby Locke	5	1	0	0	5.74	9
Don Ferrarese	5	0	1	0	8.10	6
Ed Keegan	4	0	0	0	2.25	5

== Awards and honors ==
- Gene Mauch, Associated Press NL Manager of the Year
- Robin Roberts, Lou Gehrig Award

=== All-Stars ===
1962 Major League Baseball All-Star Game -first game

- Johnny Callison

1962 Major League Baseball All-Star Game -second game

- Art Mahaffey

== Farm system ==
Level	Team	League	Manager
AAA	Dallas-Fort Worth Rangers	American Association	Dick Littlefield and Ray Murray
AAA	Buffalo Bisons	International League	Kerby Farrell
A	Williamsport Grays	Eastern League	Frank Lucchesi
C	Bakersfield Bears	California League	Bob Wellman
C	Magic Valley Cowboys	Pioneer League	Jack Phillips
D	Dothan Phillies	Alabama–Florida League	Moose Johnson
D	Miami Marlins	Florida State League	Andy Seminick

Dallas-Fort Worth affiliation shared with Los Angeles Angels
