= 1962 Milwaukee Braves season =

1962 Milwaukee Braves
- League: National League
- Ballpark: Milwaukee County Stadium
- City: Milwaukee, Wisconsin
- Record: 86–76 (.531)
- League place: 5th
- Owners: Lou Perini (sold in November 1962)
- General managers: John McHale
- Managers: Birdie Tebbetts
- Television: WTMJ-TV (Earl Gillespie, Blaine Walsh, Ernie Johnson)
- Radio: WEMP (Earl Gillespie, Blaine Walsh)

The 1962 Milwaukee Braves season was the tenth for the franchise in Milwaukee and 92nd overall.

The fifth-place Braves finished the season with an 86–76 (.531) record, 15 1/2 games behind the National League champion San Francisco Giants. The home attendance at County Stadium was 766,921, eighth in the ten-team National League. It was the Braves' first season under one million in Milwaukee.

After this season in November, owner Lou Perini sold the franchise for $5.5 million to a Chicago group led by 34-year-old insurance executive William Bartholomay. Perini retained a 10% interest in the club and sat on the board of directors for a number of years.

Ten years after the final television broadcasts in Boston, broadcasts of Braves games returned to a new channel, WTMJ-TV, giving Milwaukee television viewers a chance to watch the games at home.

== Offseason ==
- October 10, 1961: Merritt Ranew was drafted from the Braves by the Houston Colt .45s in the 1961 MLB expansion draft.
- November 8, 1961: Ellis Burton and Lou Jackson were acquired by the Braves from the Toronto Maple Leafs as part of a minor league working agreement.
- November 28, 1961: Frank Thomas was traded by the Braves with a player to be named later to the New York Mets for a player to be named later and cash. The deal was completed on May 21, 1962, when the Mets sent Gus Bell to the Braves and the Braves sent Rick Herrscher to the Mets.
- December 15, 1961: Joe Azcue, Ed Charles and Manny Jiménez were traded by the Braves to the Kansas City Athletics for Lou Klimchock and Bob Shaw.
- Prior to 1962 season: Hal Haydel was signed as an amateur free agent by the Braves.

== Regular season ==
=== Season standings ===
National League
Team	W	L	Pct.	GB	Home	Road
San Francisco Giants	103	62	.624	—	61‍–‍21	42‍–‍41
Los Angeles Dodgers	102	63	.618	1	54‍–‍29	48‍–‍34
Cincinnati Reds	98	64	.605	3½	58‍–‍23	40‍–‍41
Pittsburgh Pirates	93	68	.578	8	51‍–‍30	42‍–‍38
Milwaukee Braves	86	76	.531	15½	49‍–‍32	37‍–‍44
St. Louis Cardinals	84	78	.519	17½	44‍–‍37	40‍–‍41
Philadelphia Phillies	81	80	.503	20	46‍–‍34	35‍–‍46
Houston Colt .45s	64	96	.400	36½	32‍–‍48	32‍–‍48
Chicago Cubs	59	103	.364	42½	32‍–‍49	27‍–‍54
New York Mets	40	120	.250	60½	22‍–‍58	18‍–‍62

=== Record vs. opponents ===
1962 National League record Sources:
Team	CHC	CIN	HOU	LAD	MIL	NYM	PHI	PIT	SF	STL
Chicago	—	4–14	7–11	4–14	8–10	9–9	10–8	4–14	6–12	7–11
Cincinnati	14–4	—	13–5	9–9	13–5	13–5	8–10	13–5	7–11	8–10
Houston	11–7	5–13	—	6–12	7–11	13–3–1	1–17	5–13	7–11	9–9–1
Los Angeles	14–4	9–9	12–6	—	10–8	16–2	14–4	10–8	10–11	7–11
Milwaukee	10–8	5–13	11–7	8–10	—	12–6	11–7	10–8	7–11	12–6
New York	9–9	5–13	3–13–1	2–16	6–12	—	4–14	2–16	4–14	5–13
Philadelphia	8–10	10–8	17–1	4–14	7–11	14–4	—	7–10	5–13	9–9
Pittsburgh	14–4	5–13	13–5	8–10	8–10	16–2	10–7	—	7–11	12–6
San Francisco	12–6	11–7	11–7	11–10	11–7	14–4	13–5	11–7	—	9–9
St. Louis	11–7	10–8	9–9–1	11–7	6–12	13–5	9–9	6–12	9–9	—

=== Roster ===
1962 Milwaukee Braves
Roster
Pitchers: 10 Bob Buhl; 33 Lew Burdette; 22 Cecil Butler; 40 Tony Cloninger; 30 Jim Constable; 10 Jack Curtis; 45 Hank Fischer; 36 Bob Hendley; 23 Denny Lemaster; 20 Don McMahon; 32 Don Nottebart; 35 Ron Piché; 35 Claude Raymond; 26 Bob Shaw; 21 Warren Spahn; 16 Carl Willey	Catchers: 1 Del Crandall; 15 Joe Torre; 8 Bob Uecker; Infielders: 28 Tommie Aaron; 9 Joe Adcock; 25 Ken Aspromonte; 2 Frank Bolling; 41 Eddie Mathews; 11 Roy McMillan; 29 Denis Menke; 27 Amado Samuel	Outfielders: 44 Hank Aaron; 25 Howie Bedell; 20 Gus Bell; 45 Ethan Blackaby; 18 Lou Johnson; 30 Mack Jones; 39 Mike Krsnich; 24 Lee Maye; 29 Hawk Taylor; Other batters: 18 Lou Klimchock	Manager: 6 Birdie Tebbetts; Coaches: 3 Bill Adair; 4 Jimmy Dykes; 48 Andy Pafko; 5 Whit Wyatt

== Player stats ==
=== Batting ===
==== Starters by position ====
Note: Pos = Position; G = Games played; AB = At bats; H = Hits; Avg. = Batting average; HR = Home runs; RBI = Runs batted in

Pos	Player	G	AB	H	Avg.	HR	RBI
C	Del Crandall	107	350	104	.297	8	45
1B	Joe Adcock	121	391	97	.248	29	78
2B	Frank Bolling	122	406	110	.271	9	43
SS	Roy McMillan	137	468	115	.246	12	41
3B	Eddie Mathews	152	536	142	.265	29	90
LF	Gus Bell	79	214	61	.285	5	24
CF	Hank Aaron	156	592	191	.323	45	128
RF	Mack Jones	91	333	85	.255	10	36

==== Other batters ====
Note: G = Games played; AB = At bats; H = Hits; Avg. = Batting average; HR = Home runs; RBI = Runs batted in

Player	G	AB	H	Avg.	HR	RBI
Lee Maye	99	349	85	.244	10	41
Tommie Aaron	141	334	77	.231	8	38
Joe Torre	80	220	62	.282	5	26
Amado Samuel	76	209	43	.206	3	20
Denis Menke	50	146	28	.192	2	16
Howie Bedell	58	138	27	.196	0	2
Lou Johnson	61	117	33	.282	2	13
Ken Aspromonte	34	79	23	.291	0	7
Bob Uecker	33	64	16	.250	1	8
Hawk Taylor	20	47	12	.255	0	2
Ethan Blackaby	6	13	2	.154	0	0
Mike Krsnich	11	12	1	.083	0	2
Lou Klimchock	8	8	0	.000	0	0

=== Pitching ===
==== Starting pitchers ====
Note: G = Games pitched; IP = Innings pitched; W = Wins; L = Losses; ERA = Earned run average; SO = Strikeouts

Player	G	IP	W	L	ERA	SO
Warren Spahn	34	269.1	18	14	3.04	118
Bob Shaw	38	225.0	15	9	2.80	124
Bob Hendley	35	200.0	11	13	3.60	112
Bob Buhl	1	2.0	0	1	22.50	1

==== Other pitchers ====
Note: G = Games pitched; IP = Innings pitched; W = Wins; L = Losses; ERA = Earned run average; SO = Strikeouts

Player	G	IP	W	L	ERA	SO
Lew Burdette	37	143.2	10	9	4.89	59
Tony Cloninger	24	111.0	8	3	4.30	69
Denny Lemaster	17	86.2	3	4	3.01	69
Ron Piché	14	52.0	3	2	4.85	28
Cecil Butler	9	31.0	2	0	2.61	22
Jim Constable	3	18.0	1	1	2.00	12

==== Relief pitchers ====
Note: G = Games pitched; W = Wins; L = Losses; SV = Saves; ERA = Earned run average; SO = Strikeouts

Player	G	W	L	SV	ERA	SO
Claude Raymond	26	5	5	10	2.74	40
Don Nottebart	39	2	2	2	3.23	36
Jack Curtis	30	4	4	1	4.16	40
Carl Willey	30	2	5	1	5.40	40
Hank Fischer	29	2	3	4	5.30	29
Don McMahon	2	0	1	0	6.00	3

== Farm system ==
Level	Team	League	Manager
AAA	Louisville Colonels	American Association	Jack Tighe
AAA	Toronto Maple Leafs	International League	Chuck Dressen
AA	Austin Senators	Texas League	Jimmy Brown
B	Yakima Bears	Northwest League	Buddy Hicks
C	Eau Claire Braves	Northern League	Jim Fanning
C	Boise Braves	Pioneer League	Al Unser
D	Dublin Braves	Georgia–Florida League	Bill Steinecke
D	Cedar Rapids Red Raiders	Midwest League	Ken Blackman

LEAGUE CHAMPIONS: Louisville
