= 1962 Cincinnati Reds season =

1962 Cincinnati Reds
- League: National League
- Ballpark: Crosley Field
- City: Cincinnati
- Owners: Bill DeWitt
- General managers: Bill DeWitt
- Managers: Fred Hutchinson
- Television: WLWT (Ed Kennedy, Frank McCormick)
- Radio: WKRC (Waite Hoyt, Gene Kelly)

The 1962 Cincinnati Reds season was a season in American baseball. The team finished in third place in the National League standings, with a record of 98–64, 3 1/2 games behind the NL Champion San Francisco Giants. The Reds were managed by Fred Hutchinson, and played their home games at Crosley Field.

The Reds entered the season as the defending NL Champions, having won the 1961 pennant by 4 games over the second-place Dodgers. The Reds' lineup returned intact, although sophomore Leo Cárdenas was set to replace veteran Eddie Kasko at shortstop, putting the versatile Kasko in a "super-sub" role. That all changed in spring training when slugging third-baseman Gene Freese broke his ankle during an intra-squad game and missed virtually the entire season. The light-hitting Kasko was moved to third base and played well, but the Reds sorely missed the 26 home runs and 87 RBI that Freese had provided the year before. The lack of Freese's big bat severely hurt the Reds' chances to repeat as National League champions.

The Dodgers and Giants dominated the National League most of the year, with the Reds a distant third. Aided by two expansion teams (the Houston Colt .45s and the New York Mets), the top NL teams were winning at a very high rate. By June 6, Giants were 40–16 (.714) and the Dodgers 40–17 (.702). The Reds were playing solid baseball themselves (29–20, .592), but still trailed the Giants by 7 1/2 games and the Dodgers by 7. Cincinnati stayed a relatively distant third for most of the season until a 9-game winning streak August 5–13 drew the Reds to within 6 1/2 games of the Dodgers and to within 4 games of the Giants. By Aug. 25, the Reds had crept to within 3 games of the Dodgers and 3 1/2 games of the Giants, thanks to a 6-game winning streak.

The Reds had made up ground on both the Giants and the Dodgers, who had finally started to fade. Los Angeles lost star pitcher Sandy Koufax to a finger injury on July 17 against the Reds. The lefty missed 58 games and approximately 13 to 14 starts before returning in September. The Giants came to Crosley Field to play a 2-game set with the Reds September 12–13, the last time the Giants and Reds would meet. The Reds won both games to pull to within 3 games of the Giants and Dodgers with 13 games to go. With first place within reach, the Reds went on a crucial 9-game road trip to New York, Philadelphia and Pittsburgh, but won just 3 of 9 games, going 1–2 in each city. Meanwhile, the Giants also initially stumbled down the stretch. After leaving Cincinnati, the Giants went to Pittsburgh and promptly got swept in a 4-game series at Forbes Field, which marked 6-straight losses. San Francisco righted the ship and won 7 of its last 11 to tie the Dodgers at 101-61 while the Reds were three games back. In a 3-game "playoff" series where the statistics counted for the regular season, San Francisco beat Los Angeles 2 games to 1 to win the right to face the New York Yankees in the 1962 World Series.

The Reds finished with virtually the same winning percentage (.605) as the one (.604) that was good enough to win the NL pennant in 1961. Reds right fielder Frank Robinson followed up his '61 MVP season with another monster year at the plate, slugging 39 home runs (3rd in the NL), 136 RBI (3rd in the NL), and his .342 batting average was just .004 behind the Dodgers' Tommy Davis in a race for the batting crown. Robinson also led the league with 134 runs scored and a 1.045 OPS, while he was second in the Senior Circuit with 208 hits and 380 total bases. Robinson finished fourth in the NL MVP voting behind Maury Wills, Willie Mays and Davis.

Bob Purkey emerged as the Reds' staff ace with a career year, compiling a 23–5 record while pitching 288.1 innings. Purkey was third in the NL Cy Young Award voting behind the Dodgers' Don Drysdale and San Francisco's Jack Sanford. Purkey also finished eighth in the NL MVP voting.

== Offseason ==
- October 10, 1961: Outfielder Gus Bell was drafted from the Reds by the New York Mets in the 1961 MLB expansion draft.
- December 14, 1961: Pitcher Marshall Bridges was traded by the Reds to the New York Yankees for catcher Jesse Gonder.
- December 15, 1961: Pitcher Dave Stenhouse and catcher Bob Schmidt were traded by the Reds to the Washington Senators for outfielder Marty Keough and pitcher Johnny Klippstein.

== Regular season ==
=== Season standings ===
National League
Team	W	L	Pct.	GB	Home	Road
San Francisco Giants	103	62	.624	—	61‍–‍21	42‍–‍41
Los Angeles Dodgers	102	63	.618	1	54‍–‍29	48‍–‍34
Cincinnati Reds	98	64	.605	3½	58‍–‍23	40‍–‍41
Pittsburgh Pirates	93	68	.578	8	51‍–‍30	42‍–‍38
Milwaukee Braves	86	76	.531	15½	49‍–‍32	37‍–‍44
St. Louis Cardinals	84	78	.519	17½	44‍–‍37	40‍–‍41
Philadelphia Phillies	81	80	.503	20	46‍–‍34	35‍–‍46
Houston Colt .45s	64	96	.400	36½	32‍–‍48	32‍–‍48
Chicago Cubs	59	103	.364	42½	32‍–‍49	27‍–‍54
New York Mets	40	120	.250	60½	22‍–‍58	18‍–‍62

=== Record vs. opponents ===
1962 National League record Sources:
Team	CHC	CIN	HOU	LAD	MIL	NYM	PHI	PIT	SF	STL
Chicago	—	4–14	7–11	4–14	8–10	9–9	10–8	4–14	6–12	7–11
Cincinnati	14–4	—	13–5	9–9	13–5	13–5	8–10	13–5	7–11	8–10
Houston	11–7	5–13	—	6–12	7–11	13–3–1	1–17	5–13	7–11	9–9–1
Los Angeles	14–4	9–9	12–6	—	10–8	16–2	14–4	10–8	10–11	7–11
Milwaukee	10–8	5–13	11–7	8–10	—	12–6	11–7	10–8	7–11	12–6
New York	9–9	5–13	3–13–1	2–16	6–12	—	4–14	2–16	4–14	5–13
Philadelphia	8–10	10–8	17–1	4–14	7–11	14–4	—	7–10	5–13	9–9
Pittsburgh	14–4	5–13	13–5	8–10	8–10	16–2	10–7	—	7–11	12–6
San Francisco	12–6	11–7	11–7	11–10	11–7	14–4	13–5	11–7	—	9–9
St. Louis	11–7	10–8	9–9–1	11–7	6–12	13–5	9–9	6–12	9–9	—

=== Notable transactions ===
- May 7, 1962: Bob Miller and Cliff Cook were traded by the Reds to the New York Mets for Don Zimmer.

=== Roster ===
1962 Cincinnati Reds
Roster
Pitchers: 42 Jim Brosnan; 34 Moe Drabowsky; 32 Sammy Ellis; 44 Bill Henry; 38 Dave Hillman; 30 Joey Jay; 47 Johnny Klippstein; 46 Jim Maloney; 39 Bob Miller; 43 Howie Nunn; 41 Joe Nuxhall; 31 Jim O'Toole; 37 Bob Purkey; 40 Dave Sisler; 38 John Tsitouris; 39 Ted Wills	Catchers: 6 Johnny Edwards; 9 Hank Foiles; 5 Darrell Johnson; Infielders: 11 Rogelio Álvarez; 19 Don Blasingame; 16 Leo Cárdenas; 18 Gordy Coleman; 15 Cliff Cook; 12 Gene Freese; 14 Tommy Harper; 10 Eddie Kasko; 8 Don Pavletich; 17 Cookie Rojas; 14 Don Zimmer	Outfielders: 21 Joe Gaines; 25 Marty Keough; 24 Jerry Lynch; 28 Vada Pinson; 29 Wally Post; 20 Frank Robinson; Other batters: 7 Jesse Gonder	Manager: 1 Fred Hutchinson; Coaches: 23 Otis Douglas; 4 Reggie Otero; 2 Dick Sisler; 3 Jim Turner; 27 Pete Whisenant

== Player stats ==
= Indicates team leader

=== Batting ===
==== Starters by position ====
Note: Pos = Position; G = Games played; AB = At bats; H = Hits; Avg. = Batting average; HR = Home runs; RBI = Runs batted in

Pos	Player	G	AB	H	Avg.	HR	RBI
C	Johnny Edwards	133	452	115	.254	8	50
1B	Gordy Coleman	136	476	132	.277	28	86
2B	Don Blasingame	141	494	139	.281	2	35
SS	Leo Cárdenas	153	589	173	.294	10	60
3B	Eddie Kasko	134	533	148	.278	4	41
LF	Wally Post	109	285	75	.263	17	62
CF	Vada Pinson	155	619	181	.292	23	100
RF	Frank Robinson	162	609	208	.342	39	136

==== Reserves ====
Note: G = Games played; AB = At bats; H = Hits; Avg. = Batting average; HR = Home runs; RBI = Runs batted in

Player	G	AB	H	Avg.	HR	RBI
Jerry Lynch	114	288	81	.281	12	57
Marty Keough	111	230	64	.278	7	27
Don Zimmer	63	192	48	.250	2	16
Hank Foiles	14	131	36	.275	7	25
Cookie Rojas	97	86	19	.221	0	6
Don Pavletich	34	63	14	.222	1	7
Joe Gaines	64	52	12	.231	1	7
Gene Freese	18	42	6	.143	0	1
Rogelio Álvarez	14	28	6	.214	0	2
Tommy Harper	6	23	4	.174	0	1
Cliff Cook	6	5	0	.000	0	0
Darrell Johnson	2	4	0	.000	0	0
Jesse Gonder	4	4	0	.000	0	0

=== Pitching ===
==== Starting pitchers ====
Note: G = Games pitched; IP = Innings pitched; W = Wins; L = Losses; ERA = Earned run average; SO = Strikeouts

Player	G	IP	W	L	ERA	SO
Bob Purkey	37	288.1	23	5	2.81	141
Joey Jay	39	273.0	21	14	3.76	155
Jim O'Toole	36	251.2	16	13	3.50	170
Jim Maloney	22	115.1	9	7	3.51	105
Joe Nuxhall	12	66.0	5	0	2.45	57

==== Other pitchers ====
Note: G = Games pitched; IP = Innings pitched; W = Wins; L = Losses; ERA = Earned run average; SO = Strikeouts

Player	G	IP	W	L	ERA	SO
Moe Drabowsky	23	83.0	2	6	4.99	56
Sammy Ellis	8	28.0	2	2	6.75	27
John Tsitouris	4	21.1	1	0	0.84	7

==== Relief pitchers ====
Note: G = Games pitched; W = Wins; L = Losses; SV = Saves; ERA = Earned run average; SO = Strikeouts

Player	G	W	L	SV	ERA	SO
Jim Brosnan	48	4	4	13	3.34	51
Johnny Klippstein	40	7	6	4	4.47	67
Bill Henry	40	4	2	11	4.58	35
Dave Sisler	35	4	3	1	3.92	27
Ted Wills	26	0	2	3	5.31	58
Howie Nunn	6	0	0	0	5.59	4
Bob Miller	6	0	0	0	21.94	4
Dave Hillman	2	0	0	0	9.82	0

== Awards and honors ==
All-Star Game

- Bob Purkey, Pitcher, Reserve (both games)
- Frank Robinson, Outfield, Reserve (second game)

== Farm system ==
Level	Team	League	Manager
AAA	San Diego Padres	Pacific Coast League	Don Heffner
A	Macon Peaches	Sally League	Dave Bristol
B	Rocky Mount Leafs	Carolina League	Hersh Freeman and Jack Cassini
D	Tampa Tarpons	Florida State League	Johnny Vander Meer and Hersh Freeman
D	Geneva Redlegs	New York–Penn League	Karl Kuehl

LEAGUE CHAMPIONS: San Diego, Macon
