= John Anderson (pitcher) =

American baseball player (1929–1998)

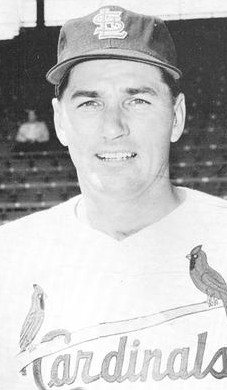
- Pitcher
- Born: November 23, 1929; St. Paul, Minnesota, U.S.
- Died: December 20, 1998 (aged 69); Houston, Texas, U.S.
- Batted: Right Threw: Right

MLB debut
- August 17, 1958, for the Philadelphia Phillies

Last MLB appearance
- June 23, 1962, for the Houston Colt .45s

MLB statistics
- Win–loss record: 0–0
- Earned run average: 6.45
- Strikeouts: 19
- Stats at Baseball Reference

Teams
- Philadelphia Phillies (1958); Baltimore Orioles (1960); St. Louis Cardinals (1962); Houston Colt .45s (1962)

John Charles Anderson (November 23, 1929 – December 20, 1998) was an American professional baseball player and right-handed pitcher who appeared in 24 games during parts of three seasons in Major League Baseball between 1958 and 1962 for the Philadelphia Phillies, Baltimore Orioles, St. Louis Cardinals and Houston Colt .45s. His professional career spanned 472 games and 16 seasons, from 1952 to 1967, most of which were spent in the minor leagues.

Born in Saint Paul, Anderson attended the University of Minnesota. Listed as 6 feet 1 inch (1.85 m) tall and 190 pounds (86 kg), he entered pro baseball in the Phillies' system and won 18 games in his second pro season, 1953, with Terre Haute of the Class B Illinois–Indiana–Iowa League. But he wasn't called up to Philadelphia until he was 28 and a seven-year minor-league veteran. In his MLB debut, he threw a scoreless inning of relief on August 17, 1958, on the road against the Milwaukee Braves. Then, seven days later, he made his only big-league start at Wrigley Field against the Chicago Cubs. Anderson went six innings and allowed seven hits but only two runs when Jim Marshall homered with a man aboard in the third frame. He left the contest for a pinch hitter in the seventh inning trailing 2–1, and when the Phils rallied for four runs in the eighth to win the rain-shortened contest, 5–3, they took Anderson off the hook for the potential defeat. Anderson appeared three more times for the 1958 Phillies, but was treated roughly, his earned run average spiking from 2.57 to 7.88.

He then spent 1959 back in the minors before getting his second big-league audition with the 1960 Orioles during the season's early weeks. He pitched in four contests in relief for Baltimore and was effective in his first two appearances before two terrible outings against the New York Yankees inflated his ERA from 0.00 to 13.50. The remainder of 1960 and all of 1961 was spent in the Triple-A International League before the Cardinals acquired him in the 1961 Rule 5 draft. He made the Redbirds' 1962 early-season roster and turned in a solid overall performance, registering his lone MLB save and allowing only one run in five relief appearances over 61/3 innings pitched through May 5. Two days later, the Cardinals included him in a trade to the Colt .45s, a brand-new expansion team, in which St. Louis obtained veteran left-hander Bobby Shantz from Houston for Anderson and outfielder Carl Warwick. The Colt .45s used Anderson in ten games out of their bullpen through June 23, but he failed to repeat his earlier success as a Cardinal, posting a 5.09 ERA in 172/3 innings. He returned to the minors for the rest of his career.

All told, he was credited with one save but no decisions during his 24-game big-league tenure. In 442/3 total innings pitched, he permitted 32 earned runs, 64 hits and 14 bases on balls, striking out 19.

John Anderson died in Houston at age 69 on December 20, 1998.
