= 1962 St. Louis Cardinals season =

Major League Baseball season

1962 St. Louis Cardinals
- League: National League
- Ballpark: Busch Stadium I
- City: St. Louis, Missouri
- Record: 84–78 (.519)
- League place: 6th
- Owners: August "Gussie" Busch
- General managers: Bing Devine
- Managers: Johnny Keane
- Television: KPLR
- Radio: KMOX (Harry Caray, Jack Buck, Joe Garagiola)

The 1962 St. Louis Cardinals season was the team's 81st season in St. Louis, Missouri and its 71st season in the National League. The Cardinals went 84–78 during the season and finished sixth in the National League, 17 1/2 games behind the San Francisco Giants. Also in 1962, the Cardinals became the first NL club to wear names on the backs of their uniforms that season.

== Offseason ==
- October 10, 1961: 1961 Major League Baseball expansion draft
  - Bob Lillis was drafted from the Cardinals by the Houston Colt .45's.
  - Don Taussig was drafted from the Cardinals by the Houston Colt .45's.
- October 13, 1961: Al Cicotte was purchased from the Cardinals by the Houston Colt .45's.
- October 24, 1961: Red Schoendienst was released by the Cardinals
- November 21, 1961: Elrod Hendricks was signed as a free agent by the Cardinals.
- November 27, 1961: Joe Cunningham was traded by the Cardinals to the Chicago White Sox for Minnie Miñoso.
- November 27, 1961: John Anderson was drafted by the Cardinals from the Baltimore Orioles in the 1961 rule 5 draft.
- Prior to 1962 season: Duke Carmel was acquired by the Cardinals from the Los Angeles Dodgers.
- March 1962: Duke Carmel was purchased from the Cardinals by the Cleveland Indians.

== Regular season ==
Pitcher Bobby Shantz and first baseman Bill White won Gold Gloves this year.

=== Season standings ===
National League
Team	W	L	Pct.	GB	Home	Road
San Francisco Giants	103	62	.624	—	61‍–‍21	42‍–‍41
Los Angeles Dodgers	102	63	.618	1	54‍–‍29	48‍–‍34
Cincinnati Reds	98	64	.605	3½	58‍–‍23	40‍–‍41
Pittsburgh Pirates	93	68	.578	8	51‍–‍30	42‍–‍38
Milwaukee Braves	86	76	.531	15½	49‍–‍32	37‍–‍44
St. Louis Cardinals	84	78	.519	17½	44‍–‍37	40‍–‍41
Philadelphia Phillies	81	80	.503	20	46‍–‍34	35‍–‍46
Houston Colt .45s	64	96	.400	36½	32‍–‍48	32‍–‍48
Chicago Cubs	59	103	.364	42½	32‍–‍49	27‍–‍54
New York Mets	40	120	.250	60½	22‍–‍58	18‍–‍62

=== Record vs. opponents ===
1962 National League record Sources:
Team	CHC	CIN	HOU	LAD	MIL	NYM	PHI	PIT	SF	STL
Chicago	—	4–14	7–11	4–14	8–10	9–9	10–8	4–14	6–12	7–11
Cincinnati	14–4	—	13–5	9–9	13–5	13–5	8–10	13–5	7–11	8–10
Houston	11–7	5–13	—	6–12	7–11	13–3–1	1–17	5–13	7–11	9–9–1
Los Angeles	14–4	9–9	12–6	—	10–8	16–2	14–4	10–8	10–11	7–11
Milwaukee	10–8	5–13	11–7	8–10	—	12–6	11–7	10–8	7–11	12–6
New York	9–9	5–13	3–13–1	2–16	6–12	—	4–14	2–16	4–14	5–13
Philadelphia	8–10	10–8	17–1	4–14	7–11	14–4	—	7–10	5–13	9–9
Pittsburgh	14–4	5–13	13–5	8–10	8–10	16–2	10–7	—	7–11	12–6
San Francisco	12–6	11–7	11–7	11–10	11–7	14–4	13–5	11–7	—	9–9
St. Louis	11–7	10–8	9–9–1	11–7	6–12	13–5	9–9	6–12	9–9	—

=== Notable transactions ===
- May 7, 1962: John Anderson and Carl Warwick were traded by the Cardinals to the Houston Colt .45s for Bobby Shantz.
- June 5, 1962: Alex Grammas and Don Landrum were traded by the Cardinals to the Chicago Cubs for Bob Smith and Daryl Robertson.

=== Roster ===
1962 St. Louis Cardinals
Roster
Pitchers: 35 John Anderson; 38 Ed Bauta; 40 Harvey Branch; 32 Ernie Broglio; 33 Bob Duliba; 36 Don Ferrarese; 45 Bob Gibson; 39 Larry Jackson; 36 Bobby Locke; 41 Lindy McDaniel; 37 Ray Sadecki; 34 Bobby Shantz; 31 Curt Simmons; 42 Paul Toth; 44 Ray Washburn	Catchers: 29 Gene Oliver; 1 Carl Sawatski; 4 Jimmie Schaffer; Infielders: 14 Ken Boyer; 19 Julio Gotay; 10 Alex Grammas; 25 Julián Javier; 27 Dal Maxvill; 2 Red Schoendienst; 12 Bill White; 17 Fred Whitfield	Outfielders: 24 Bob Burda; 22 Doug Clemens; 21 Curt Flood; 23 Charlie James; 20 Gary Kolb; 24 Don Landrum; 9 Minnie Miñoso; 6 Stan Musial; 28 Mike Shannon; 35 Bobby Gene Smith; 27 Carl Warwick	Manager: 5 Johnny Keane; Coaches: 8 Vern Benson; 26 Howie Pollet; 18 Hal Smith; 3 Harry Walker

== Player stats ==
=== Batting ===
==== Starters by position ====
Note: Pos = Position; G = Games played; AB = At bats; H = Hits; Avg. = Batting average; HR = Home runs; RBI = Runs batted in

Pos	Player	G	AB	H	Avg.	HR	RBI
C	Gene Oliver	122	345	89	.258	14	45
1B	Bill White	159	614	199	.324	20	102
2B	Julián Javier	155	598	157	.263	7	39
SS	Julio Gotay	127	369	94	.255	2	27
3B	Ken Boyer	160	611	178	.291	24	98
LF	Stan Musial	135	433	143	.330	19	82
CF	Curt Flood	151	635	188	.296	12	70
RF	Charlie James	129	388	107	.276	8	59

==== Other batters ====
Note: G = Games played; AB = At bats; H = Hits; Avg. = Batting average; HR = Home runs; RBI = Runs batted in

Player	G	AB	H	Avg.	HR	RBI
Carl Sawatski	85	222	56	.252	13	42
Dal Maxvill	79	189	42	.222	1	18
Fred Whitfield	73	158	42	.266	8	34
Red Schoendienst	98	143	43	.301	2	12
Bobby Smith	91	130	30	.231	0	12
Minnie Miñoso	39	97	19	.196	1	10
Doug Clemens	48	93	22	.237	1	12
Jimmie Schaffer	70	66	16	.242	0	6
Don Landrum	32	35	11	.314	0	3
Carl Warwick	13	23	8	.348	1	4
Alex Grammas	21	18	2	.111	0	1
Mike Shannon	10	15	2	.133	0	0
Bob Burda	7	14	1	.071	0	0
Gary Kolb	6	14	5	.357	0	0

=== Pitching ===
==== Starting pitchers ====
Note: G = Games pitched; IP = Innings pitched; W = Wins; L = Losses; ERA = Earned run average; SO = Strikeouts

Player	G	IP	W	L	ERA	SO
Larry Jackson	36	252.1	16	11	3.75	112
Bob Gibson	32	233.2	15	13	2.85	208
Ernie Broglio	34	222.1	12	9	3.00	132
Ray Washburn	34	175.2	12	9	4.10	109
Curt Simmons	31	154.0	10	10	3.51	74
Ray Sadecki	22	102.1	6	8	5.54	50
Harvey Branch	1	5.0	0	1	5.40	2

==== Other pitchers ====
Note: G = Games pitched; IP = Innings pitched; W = Wins; L = Losses; ERA = Earned run average; SO = Strikeouts

Player	G	IP	W	L	ERA	SO
Paul Toth	6	16.2	1	0	5.40	5

==== Relief pitchers ====
Note: G = Games pitched; W = Wins; L = Losses; SV = Saves; ERA = Earned run average; SO = Strikeouts

Player	G	W	L	SV	ERA	SO
Lindy McDaniel	55	3	10	14	4.12	79
Don Ferrarese	38	1	4	1	2.70	45
Bobby Shantz	28	5	3	4	2.18	47
Bob Duliba	28	2	0	2	2.06	22
Ed Bauta	20	1	0	1	5.01	25
John Anderson	5	0	0	0	1.42	3
Bobby Locke	1	0	0	0	0.00	1

== Farm system ==
Level	Team	League	Manager
AAA	Atlanta Crackers	International League	Joe Schultz
AA	Tulsa Oilers	Texas League	Whitey Kurowski
A	Portsmouth-Norfolk Tides	Sally League	Chase Riddle
C	Winnipeg Goldeyes	Northern League	Fred Koenig
C	Billings Mustangs	Pioneer League	Grover Resinger
D	Brunswick Cardinals	Georgia–Florida League	Owen Friend

LEAGUE CHAMPIONS: Atlanta, Tulsa, Billings
