= 1962 Pittsburgh Pirates season =

1962 Pittsburgh Pirates
- League: National League
- Ballpark: Forbes Field
- City: Pittsburgh, Pennsylvania
- Owners: John W. Galbreath (majority shareholder); Bing Crosby, Thomas P. Johnson (minority shareholders)
- General managers: Joe L. Brown
- Managers: Danny Murtaugh
- Television: KDKA-TV; Bob Prince, Jim Woods
- Radio: KDKA; Bob Prince, Paul Long, Jim Woods

The 1962 Pittsburgh Pirates season involved the team's 93–68 season, good for fourth place in the National League, eight games behind the NL Champion San Francisco Giants. The Pirates were the first team to lose to the New York Mets with a 9-1 loss at home on April 23, which came after the Mets lost their first nine games of the season. Ironically enough, the loss was also the first of the season for the Pirates after a 10-0 start.

== Offseason ==
- October 10, 1961: 1961 Major League Baseball expansion draft
  - Joe Christopher was drafted from the Pirates by the New York Mets.
  - Al Jackson was drafted from the Pirates by the New York Mets.
- November 21, 1961: Coot Veal was purchased by the Pirates from the Washington Senators.
- December 4, 1961: Ramón Hernández was purchased from the Pirates by the Los Angeles Angels.

== Regular season ==
=== Season standings ===
National League
Team	W	L	Pct.	GB	Home	Road
San Francisco Giants	103	62	.624	—	61‍–‍21	42‍–‍41
Los Angeles Dodgers	102	63	.618	1	54‍–‍29	48‍–‍34
Cincinnati Reds	98	64	.605	3½	58‍–‍23	40‍–‍41
Pittsburgh Pirates	93	68	.578	8	51‍–‍30	42‍–‍38
Milwaukee Braves	86	76	.531	15½	49‍–‍32	37‍–‍44
St. Louis Cardinals	84	78	.519	17½	44‍–‍37	40‍–‍41
Philadelphia Phillies	81	80	.503	20	46‍–‍34	35‍–‍46
Houston Colt .45s	64	96	.400	36½	32‍–‍48	32‍–‍48
Chicago Cubs	59	103	.364	42½	32‍–‍49	27‍–‍54
New York Mets	40	120	.250	60½	22‍–‍58	18‍–‍62

=== Record vs. opponents ===
1962 National League record Sources:
Team	CHC	CIN	HOU	LAD	MIL	NYM	PHI	PIT	SF	STL
Chicago	—	4–14	7–11	4–14	8–10	9–9	10–8	4–14	6–12	7–11
Cincinnati	14–4	—	13–5	9–9	13–5	13–5	8–10	13–5	7–11	8–10
Houston	11–7	5–13	—	6–12	7–11	13–3–1	1–17	5–13	7–11	9–9–1
Los Angeles	14–4	9–9	12–6	—	10–8	16–2	14–4	10–8	10–11	7–11
Milwaukee	10–8	5–13	11–7	8–10	—	12–6	11–7	10–8	7–11	12–6
New York	9–9	5–13	3–13–1	2–16	6–12	—	4–14	2–16	4–14	5–13
Philadelphia	8–10	10–8	17–1	4–14	7–11	14–4	—	7–10	5–13	9–9
Pittsburgh	14–4	5–13	13–5	8–10	8–10	16–2	10–7	—	7–11	12–6
San Francisco	12–6	11–7	11–7	11–10	11–7	14–4	13–5	11–7	—	9–9
St. Louis	11–7	10–8	9–9–1	11–7	6–12	13–5	9–9	6–12	9–9	—

=== Game log ===
1962 Game Log: 93–68 (Home: 51–30; Away: 42–38)
April: 13–5 (Home: 4–2; Away: 9–3)

#	Date	Opponent	Score	Win	Loss	Save	Attendance	Record
1	April 10	Phillies	6–0	**Friend** (1–0)	Owens	—	28,813	1–0
2	April 13	@ Mets	4–3	**Sturdivant** (1–0)	Jones	**Face** (1)	12,447	2–0
3	April 14	@ Mets	6–2	**Mizell** (1–0)	Jackson	**Face** (2)	9,231	3–0
4	April 15	@ Mets	7–2	**Friend** (2–0)	Craig	—	11,278	4–0
5	April 16	@ Cubs	6–5	**Olivo** (1–0)	Anderson	**Face** (3)	1,642	5–0
6	April 17	@ Cubs	10–6	**Haddix** (1–0)	Schultz	—	1,937	6–0
7	April 18	@ Phillies	4–3	**Francis** (1–0)	Hamilton	—	7,284	7–0
8	April 19	@ Phillies	6–3	**McBean** (1–0)	Mahaffey	**Lamabe** (1)	8,427	8–0
9	April 21	Mets	8–4	**Friend** (3–0)	Miller	**Face** (4)	17,927	9–0
10	April 22	Mets	4–3	**Veale** (1–0)	Jones	—	13,780	10–0
11	April 23	Mets	1–9	Hook	**Sturdivant** (1–1)	—	16,676	10–1
12	April 24	Giants	7–3	**McBean** (2–0)	Marichal	**Face** (5)	18,620	11–1
13	April 25	Giants	3–8	Perry	**Friend** (3–1)	Larsen	21,652	11–2
14	April 27	@ Dodgers	2–7	Drysdale	**Veale** (1–1)	—	40,509	11–3
15	April 28	@ Dodgers	1–2	Koufax	**Francis** (1–1)	—	26,332	11–4
16	April 29	@ Dodgers	6–1	**Friend** (4–1)	Podres	—		12–4
17	April 29	@ Dodgers	1–0	**McBean** (3–0)	Moeller	—	51,574	13–4
18	April 30	@ Giants	1–4	Perry	**Mizell** (1–1)	—	9,543	13–5

May: 13–13 (Home: 9–4; Away: 4–9)

#	Date	Opponent	Score	Win	Loss	Save	Attendance	Record
19	May 1	@ Giants	2–4	O'Dell	**Veale** (1–2)	—	23,657	13–6
20	May 2	@ Giants	2–3	Marichal	**Francis** (1–2)	—	9,926	13–7
21	May 3	@ Giants	4–8	Sanford	**Haddix** (1–1)	—	10,723	13–8
22	May 4	Dodgers	5–4	**Face** (1–0)	Moeller	—	20,986	14–8
23	May 5	Dodgers	1–10	Drysdale	**Sturdivant** (1–2)	—	13,366	14–9
24	May 9	@ Braves	2–4	Piche	**Friend** (4–2)	Fischer	3,673	14–10
25	May 10	@ Braves	3–4	Fischer	**Face** (1–1)	—	2,746	14–11
26	May 11	@ Reds	2–3 (10)	Jay	**McBean** (3–1)	—	10,448	14–12
27	May 12	@ Reds	2–9	O'Toole	**Law** (0–1)	—	16,858	14–13
28	May 13	@ Reds	4–6	Purkey	**Friend** (4–3)	Brosnan	12,004	14–14
29	May 15	Braves	5–4 (10)	**Haddix** (2–1)	Curtis	—	9,641	15–14
30	May 16	Braves	6–0	**McBean** (4–1)	Hendley	**Olivo** (1)	11,168	16–14
31	May 17	Braves	2–7	Shaw	**Friend** (4–4)	—	10,010	16–15
32	May 18	Reds	1–4	Purkey	**Haddix** (2–2)	—	17,425	16–16
33	May 20	Reds	8–2	**Law** (1–1)	Jay	—	14,971	17–16
34	May 21	Cubs	8–4	**Sturdivant** (2–2)	Ellsworth	—	7,560	18–16
35	May 22	Cubs	1–3	Cardwell	**Friend** (4–5)	—	9,584	18–17
36	May 23	@ Cardinals	6–3	**Haddix** (3–2)	Jackson	**Olivo** (2)	9,147	19–17
37	May 24	@ Cardinals	5–2	**McBean** (5–1)	Sadecki	**Face** (6)	8,536	20–17
38	May 25	@ Colt .45s	4–3 (13)	**Face** (2–1)	Tiefenauer	**Sturdivant** (1)	11,350	21–17
39	May 26	@ Colt .45s	0–2	Golden	**Friend** (4–6)	—	13,909	21–18
40	May 27	@ Colt .45s	7–2	**Law** (2–1)	Johnson	—	11,793	22–18
41	May 28	Cardinals	3–1	**Haddix** (4–2)	Broglio	—	8,051	23–18
42	May 29	Cardinals	7–6	**Sturdivant** (3–2)	Shantz	—	17,171	24–18
43	May 30	Cardinals	3–1	**Francis** (2–2)	Washburn	**Olivo** (3)	17,186	25–18
44	May 31	Cardinals	5–4	**Friend** (5–6)	Simmons	**Olivo** (4)	10,466	26–18

June: 18–14 (Home: 11–11; Away: 7–3)

#	Date	Opponent	Score	Win	Loss	Save	Attendance	Record
45	June 1	Colt .45s	8–4	**Face** (3–1)	Golden	—	14,961	27–18
46	June 2	Colt .45s	9–2	**Law** (3–1)	Farrell	—	11,703	28–18
47	June 3	Colt .45s	6–10	Tiefenauer	**Sturdivant** (3–3)	McMahon		28–19
48	June 3	Colt .45s	3–10	Johnson	**McBean** (5–2)	—	24,282	28–20
49	June 5	Dodgers	2–3	Williams	**Francis** (2–3)	Sherry		28–21
50	June 5	Dodgers	3–8	Drysdale	**Friend** (5–7)	Koufax	18,579	28–22
51	June 6	Dodgers	3–5	Moeller	**Gibbon** (0–1)	Perranoski	13,667	28–23
52	June 7	Dodgers	3–2	**Face** (4–1)	Sherry	—	12,177	29–23
53	June 9	@ Braves	3–4	Shaw	**Law** (3–2)	—		29–24
54	June 9	@ Braves	3–5	Cloninger	**McBean** (5–3)	Nottebart	8,901	29–25
55	June 10	@ Braves	12–8	**Friend** (6–7)	Piche	**Sturdivant** (2)		30–25
56	June 10	@ Braves	3–2	**Francis** (3–3)	Hendley	**Face** (7)	14,082	31–25
57	June 11	@ Cubs	6–1	**Gibbon** (1–1)	Cardwell	**Olivo** (5)	5,354	32–25
58	June 12	@ Cubs	4–3	**Haddix** (5–2)	Hobbie	**Face** (8)	3,200	33–25
59	June 13	@ Cubs	6–4	**McBean** (6–3)	Koonce	**Face** (9)	4,872	34–25
60	June 14	@ Cubs	6–3	**Friend** (7–7)	Ellsworth	—	5,005	35–25
61	June 15	Braves	9–8	**Lamabe** (1–0)	Nottebart	**Face** (10)	21,673	36–25
62	June 16	Braves	1–2	Burdette	**Law** (3–3)	—	22,437	36–26
63	June 17	Braves	7–3	**Haddix** (6–2)	Spahn	—	15,448	37–26
64	June 18	Reds	5–6	Jay	**Friend** (7–8)	Klippstein		37–27
65	June 18	Reds	2–4	Purkey	**McBean** (6–4)	—	21,884	37–28
66	June 19	Reds	1–2	Maloney	**Francis** (3–4)	Henry	12,167	37–29
67	June 20	Reds	5–4	**Law** (4–3)	O'Toole	**Face** (11)	12,965	38–29
68	June 22	Cubs	7–5	**Gibbon** (2–1)	Schultz	**Face** (12)	13,710	39–29
69	June 23	Cubs	4–3	**Olivo** (2–0)	Elston	—	8,521	40–29
70	June 24	Cubs	3–4	Buhl	**McBean** (6–5)	Anderson		40–30
71	June 24	Cubs	4–8	Koonce	**Francis** (3–5)	Schultz	15,676	40–31
72	June 25	Mets	13–3	**Law** (5–3)	Anderson	—	9,310	41–31
73	June 26	Mets	5–2	**Francis** (4–5)	Hunter	**Face** (13)	9,534	42–31
74	June 27	Mets	6–5 (10)	**Olivo** (3–0)	Craig	—	12,468	43–31
75	June 29	@ Cardinals	0–5	Simmons	**Haddix** (6–3)	—	18,531	43–32
76	June 30	@ Cardinals	17–7	**Law** (6–3)	Washburn	**Olivo** (6)	22,527	44–32

July: 17–12 (Home: 9–5; Away: 8–7)

#	Date	Opponent	Score	Win	Loss	Save	Attendance	Record
77	July 1	@ Cardinals	7–2	**McBean** (7–5)	Jackson	—	25,977	45–32
78	July 2	@ Colt .45s	4–2	**Friend** (8–8)	Woodeshick	**Face** (14)	11,760	46–32
79	July 3	@ Colt .45s	5–2	**Haddix** (7–3)	Johnson	**Face** (15)	10,729	47–32
80	July 4	@ Colt .45s	7–0	**Law** (7–3)	Bruce	—		48–32
81	July 4	@ Colt .45s	4–3	**Francis** (5–5)	Golden	**Face** (16)	20,005	49–32
82	July 5	Phillies	5–0	**McBean** (8–5)	Owens	—	13,623	50–32
83	July 6	Phillies	2–6	Mahaffey	**Friend** (8–9)	—	15,836	50–33
84	July 7	Phillies	6–4	**Face** (5–1)	Short	—	8,781	51–33
85	July 8	Phillies	4–8	Baldschun	**Law** (7–4)	—		51–34
86	July 8	Phillies	6–5	**Sturdivant** (4–3)	Smith	**Face** (17)	16,147	52–34
87	July 12	Colt .45s	6–4	**McBean** (9–5)	Golden	—	14,784	53–34
88	July 13	Colt .45s	4–0	**Friend** (9–9)	Farrell	—	15,376	54–34
89	July 14	Colt .45s	4–2	**Law** (8–4)	Bruce	—	7,343	55–34
90	July 15	Cardinals	2–3 (10)	Washburn	**Face** (5–2)	McDaniel		55–35
91	July 15	Cardinals	8–7	**Face** (6–2)	Ferrarese	—	26,905	56–35
92	July 16	Cardinals	5–2	**McBean** (10–5)	Sadecki	—	16,747	57–35
93	July 19	@ Mets	5–1	**Friend** (10–9)	Jackson	—		58–35
94	July 19	@ Mets	7–6 (10)	**Face** (7–2)	Hook	—	16,540	59–35
95	July 20	Giants	3–6	Sanford	**Law** (8–5)	Larsen	37,705	59–36
96	July 21	Giants	7–6 (11)	**Face** (8–2)	Larsen	—	23,917	60–36
97	July 22	Giants	4–5	Marichal	**Haddix** (7–4)	—	27,973	60–37
98	July 23	@ Reds	0–3	O'Toole	**Friend** (10–10)	—	11,168	60–38
99	July 24	@ Reds	4–6	Jay	**Francis** (5–6)	Henry	11,521	60–39
100	July 25	@ Reds	6–13	Purkey	**McBean** (10–6)	—	13,347	60–40
101	July 26	@ Reds	3–5	Klippstein	**Law** (8–6)	Henry	8,349	60–41
102	July 27	@ Phillies	3–5	Green	**Haddix** (7–5)	Short		60–42
103	July 27	@ Phillies	4–1	**Friend** (11–10)	Hamilton	**Face** (18)	21,159	61–42
104	July 28	@ Phillies	2–9	Mahaffey	**Francis** (5–7)	—	12,450	61–43
105	July 29	@ Phillies	1–8	McLish	**McBean** (10–7)	—	8,502	61–44

August: 18–12 (Home: 9–4; Away: 9–8)

#	Date	Opponent	Score	Win	Loss	Save	Attendance	Record
106	August 1	@ Dodgers	9–1	**Friend** (12–10)	Williams	—	42,068	62–44
107	August 2	@ Dodgers	3–5	Podres	**Gibbon** (2–2)	Sherry	40,722	62–45
108	August 3	@ Giants	5–2	**McBean** (11–7)	Marichal	**Face** (19)	15,910	63–45
109	August 4	@ Giants	5–6	Sanford	**Olivo** (3–1)	Bolin	29,370	63–46
110	August 5	@ Giants	1–2	O'Dell	**Friend** (12–11)	—	25,532	63–47
111	August 7	Cardinals	0–5	Broglio	**Gibbon** (2–3)	—	17,294	63–48
112	August 8	Cardinals	0–2	Gibson	**McBean** (11–8)	—	11,267	63–49
113	August 10	@ Cubs	6–7	Schultz	**Face** (8–3)	—	7,656	63–50
114	August 11	@ Cubs	10–6	**Law** (9–6)	Ellsworth	**Face** (20)	1,238	64–50
115	August 12	@ Cubs	5–4	**Lamabe** (2–0)	Elston	**Face** (21)	14,261	65–50
116	August 14	Dodgers	2–1	**McBean** (12–8)	Podres	—	2,121	66–50
117	August 15	Dodgers	6–3	**Friend** (13–11)	Drysdale	**Olivo** (7)	25,670	67–50
118	August 16	Dodgers	3–7	Williams	**Gibbon** (2–4)	Perranoski	23,291	67–51
119	August 17	Phillies	9–1	**Haddix** (8–5)	Hamilton	—	13,713	68–51
120	August 18	Phillies	5–2	**Sturdivant** (5–3)	McLish	**Face** (22)	10,611	69–51
121	August 19	Phillies	2–3	Short	**Face** (8–4)	Baldschun	15,680	69–52
122	August 20	@ Mets	2–0	**Friend** (14–11)	Hook	—		70–52
123	August 20	@ Mets	6–3	**McBean** (13–8)	Miller	**Face** (23)	8,214	71–52
124	August 21	@ Mets	8–6	**Olivo** (4–1)	Craig	**Face** (24)		72–52
125	August 21	@ Mets	4–5	Miller	**Face** (8–5)	—	4,184	72–53
126	August 22	Colt .45s	3–0	**Sturdivant** (6–3)	Brunet	—	10,553	73–53
127	August 23	Colt .45s	4–0	**Law** (10–6)	Johnson	—	10,742	74–53
128	August 25	@ Cardinals	2–3	Jackson	**Friend** (14–12)	—		74–54
129	August 25	@ Cardinals	4–0	**Francis** (6–7)	Simmons	—	8,959	75–54
130	August 26	@ Cardinals	5–6	Shantz	**Face** (8–6)	—		75–55
131	August 26	@ Cardinals	7–6	**Sturdivant** (7–3)	McDaniel	**Lamabe** (2)	25,556	76–55
132	August 28	Cubs	7–6	**Olivo** (5–1)	Elston	—	10,175	77–55
133	August 29	Cubs	5–2	**Friend** (15–12)	Koonce	**Face** (25)	10,714	78–55
134	August 30	Cubs	5–3	**McBean** (14–8)	Cardwell	**Face** (26)	13,639	79–55
135	August 31	@ Phillies	2–3 (11)	Baldschun	**Francis** (6–8)	—	8,191	79–56

September: 14–12 (Home: 9–4; Away: 5–8)

#	Date	Opponent	Score	Win	Loss	Save	Attendance	Record
136	September 1	@ Phillies	7–6	**Sturdivant** (8–3)	Owens	**Face** (27)	8,297	80–56
137	September 3	Mets	2–0	**Friend** (16–12)	Hook	—		81–56
138	September 3	Mets	5–4	**McBean** (15–8)	Craig	**Face** (28)	14,289	82–56
139	September 4	Mets	5–1	**Haddix** (9–5)	Anderson	—	4,364	83–56
140	September 5	@ Colt .45s	3–5	Umbricht	**Law** (10–7)	McMahon	4,593	83–57
141	September 6	@ Colt .45s	3–4	Kemmerer	**Face** (8–7)	—	5,196	83–58
142	September 7	@ Dodgers	10–1	**Francis** (7–8)	Williams	—	36,368	84–58
143	September 8	@ Dodgers	1–6	Richert	**McBean** (15–9)	—	43,887	84–59
144	September 9	@ Dodgers	3–5	Podres	**Friend** (16–13)	Perranoski	37,594	84–60
145	September 10	@ Giants	1–4	O'Dell	**Haddix** (9–6)	—	19,498	84–61
146	September 11	@ Giants	0–2	Sanford	**Sturdivant** (8–4)	—	10,283	84–62
147	September 14	Giants	5–1	**Francis** (8–8)	O'Dell	—	14,354	85–62
148	September 15	Giants	5–1	**Friend** (17–13)	Sanford	—	10,340	86–62
149	September 16	Giants	6–4 (10)	**Gibbon** (3–4)	Miller	—	14,216	87–62
150	September 17	Giants	5–2	**Sturdivant** (9–4)	McCormick	—	8,364	88–62
151	September 18	Reds	4–7 (10)	Henry	**Lamabe** (2–1)	Klippstein	5,656	88–63
152	September 19	Reds	1–0	**Friend** (18–13)	Maloney	—	3,437	89–63
153	September 20	Reds	4–3	**Priddy** (1–0)	Henry	—	3,957	90–63
154	September 21	Braves	3–7	Spahn	**McBean** (15–10)	—	6,339	90–64
155	September 22	Braves	0–2	Constable	**Sisk** (0–1)	—	5,153	90–65
156	September 23	Braves	3–10	Cloninger	**Friend** (18–14)	—	24,323	90–66
157	September 25	@ Reds	1–2	Purkey	**Sturdivant** (9–5)	—	4,500	90–67
158	September 26	@ Reds	1–0 (11)	**Francis** (9–8)	Klippstein	**Friend** (1)	3,623	91–67
159	September 28	@ Braves	8–2	**Veale** (2–2)	Constable	—	4,274	92–67
160	September 29	@ Braves	3–7	Spahn	**Sisk** (0–2)	—	11,339	92–68
161	September 30	@ Braves	4–3	**Lamabe** (3–1)	Raymond	**Veale** (1)	7,376	93–68

Legend: = Win = Loss
Bold = Pirates team member

=== Notable transactions ===
- May 7, 1962: Vinegar Bend Mizell was traded by the Pirates to the New York Mets for Jim Marshall.
- June 1962: Coot Veal was traded by the Pirates to the Detroit Tigers for Al Pehanick (minors).
- September 9, 1962: Byron Browne was signed as an amateur free agent by the Pirates.

=== Roster ===
1962 Pittsburgh Pirates
**Roster**
**Pitchers**: 30 Tom Butters; 26 Roy Face; 27 Earl Francis; 19 Bob Friend; 22 Joe Gibbon; 31 Harvey Haddix; 36 Jack Lamabe; 32 Vern Law; 34 Al McBean; 30 Vinegar Bend Mizell; 38 Diomedes Olivo; 35 Bob Priddy; 37 Tommie Sisk; 15 Tom Sturdivant; 39 Bob Veale	**Catchers**: 6 Smoky Burgess; 2 Don Leppert; 3 Orlando McFarlane; 23 Cal Neeman; 20 Elmo Plaskett; **Infielders**: 3 Bob Bailey; 17 Donn Clendenon; 24 Dick Groat; 12 Don Hoak; 16 Johnny Logan; 14 Jim Marshall; 9 Bill Mazeroski; 11 Dick Schofield; 7 Dick Stuart	**Outfielders**: 21 Roberto Clemente; 14 Larry Elliot; 5 Howie Goss; 4 Bob Skinner; 8 Willie Stargell; 18 Bill Virdon; **Other batters**: 8 Coot Veal	**Manager**: 40 Danny Murtaugh; **Coaches**: 41 Bill Burwell; 45 Lenny Levy; 43 Sam Narron; 42 Ron Northey; 44 Frank Oceak

== Statistics ==
Batting

Note: G = Games played; AB = At bats; H = Hits; Avg. = Batting average; HR = Home runs; RBI = Runs batted in

Regular Season
Player	G	AB	H	Avg.	HR	RBI
S. Burgess	103	360	118	0.328	13	61
R. Clemente	144	538	168	0.312	10	74
V. Law	23	45	14	0.311	0	5
B. Skinner	144	510	154	0.302	20	75
D. Clendenon	80	222	67	0.302	7	28
L. Elliot	8	10	3	0.300	1	2
J. Logan	44	80	24	0.300	1	12
D. Groat	161	678	199	0.294	2	61
W. Stargell	10	31	9	0.290	0	4
D. Schofield	54	104	30	0.288	2	10
E. Plaskett	7	14	4	0.286	1	3
B. Mazeroski	159	572	155	0.271	14	81
D. Leppert	45	139	37	0.266	3	18
H. Haddix	28	52	13	0.250	1	5
B. Veale	11	16	4	0.250	0	0
B. Virdon	156	663	164	0.247	6	47
H. Goss	89	111	27	0.243	2	10
D. Hoak	121	411	99	0.241	5	48
D. Stuart	114	394	90	0.228	16	64
J. Marshall	55	100	22	0.220	2	12
A. McBean	34	67	14	0.209	0	6
T. Sisk	5	5	1	0.200	0	1
D. Olivo	62	16	3	0.188	0	1
T. Sturdivant	49	33	6	0.182	0	3
C. Neeman	24	50	9	0.180	1	5
J. Gibbon	19	17	3	0.176	0	0
B. Bailey	14	42	7	0.167	0	6
E. Francis	36	61	10	0.164	1	7
B. Friend	39	91	11	0.121	0	5
O. McFarlane	8	23	2	0.087	0	1
R. Face	63	12	1	0.083	0	0
J. Lamabe	46	9	0	0.000	0	0
V. Mizell	4	6	0	0.000	0	0
C. Veal	1	1	0	0.000	0	0
T. Butters	4	0	0	—	0	0
B. Priddy	2	0	0	—	0	0
Team totals	161	5,483	1,468	0.268	108	655

Pitching

Note: G = Games pitched; IP = Innings pitched; W = Wins; L = Losses; ERA = Earned run average; SO = Strikeouts

Regular Season
Player	G	IP	W	L	ERA	SO
T. Butters	4	6	0	0	1.50	10
R. Face	63	91	8	7	1.88	45
D. Olivo	62	84 1/3	5	1	2.77	66
J. Lamabe	46	78	3	1	2.88	56
B. Priddy	2	3	1	0	3.00	1
B. Friend	39	261 2/3	18	14	3.06	144
E. Francis	36	176	9	8	3.07	121
J. Gibbon	19	57	3	4	3.63	26
A. McBean	33	189 2/3	15	10	3.70	119
T. Sturdivant	49	125 1/3	9	5	3.73	76
B. Veale	11	45 2/3	2	2	3.74	42
V. Law	23	139 1/3	10	7	3.94	78
T. Sisk	5	17 2/3	0	2	4.08	6
H. Haddix	28	141 1/3	9	6	4.20	101
V. Mizell	4	16 1/3	1	1	4.96	6
Team totals	161	1432 1/3	93	68	3.37	897

== Farm system ==
Level	Team	League	Manager
AAA	Columbus Jets	International League	Larry Shepard
A	Asheville Tourists	Sally League	Ray Hathaway
B	Kinston Eagles	Carolina League	Harding "Pete" Peterson
C	Grand Forks Chiefs	Northern League	Tom Saffell
D	Kingsport Pirates	Appalachian League	Al Kubski
D	Burlington Bees	Midwest League	James Adlam
D	Batavia Pirates	New York–Penn League	Bob Clear

LEAGUE CHAMPIONS: Kinston
