= 1962 Los Angeles Dodgers season =

1962 Los Angeles Dodgers
- League: National League
- Ballpark: Dodger Stadium
- City: Los Angeles
- Record: 102–63 (.618)
- Divisional place: 1st
- Owners: Walter O'Malley, James & Dearie Mulvey
- President: Walter O'Malley
- General managers: Buzzie Bavasi
- Managers: Walter Alston
- Television: KTTV (11)
- Radio: KFI (Vin Scully, Jerry Doggett); KWKW (Jose Garcia, Jaime Jarrín)

The 1962 Los Angeles Dodgers season was the fifth for the team in Southern California, and the 73rd for the franchise in the National League. After spending the previous four seasons at the Los Angeles Memorial Coliseum, they began the season by opening Dodger Stadium, the team's new ballpark. The stadium opened on April 10 with a game against the Cincinnati Reds. The Dodgers proceeded to win a Los Angeles record 102 games and tied the San Francisco Giants for first place in the National League. The Giants won the ensuing tie-breaker series two games to one.

== Off-season ==
- October 11, 1961: Gordie Windhorn and Bill Lajoie (minors) were traded by the Dodgers to the Kansas City Athletics for Stan Johnson, Bobby Prescott, and Jay Ward.
- December 15, 1961: Charlie Neal and a player to be named later were traded by the Dodgers to the New York Mets for Lee Walls and cash. The Dodgers completed the deal by sending Willard Hunter to the Mets on May 25, 1962.
- Prior to 1962 season: Duke Carmel was acquired from the Dodgers by the St. Louis Cardinals.
- March 24, 1962: Ramón Conde and Jim Koranda (minors) were traded by the Dodgers to the Chicago White Sox for Andy Carey.

== Regular season ==
The Los Angeles Times described the Dodgers' season as a "gamut of sublime" and "ridiculous", noting their successes—such as Maury Wills' 100 stolen bases breaking Ty Cobb's single-season record, Don Drysdale's 25 wins, and Sandy Koufax's no-hitter on June 30—together with problems such as the 18 unearned runs the defense had allowed for the season behind Drysdale, and other fielding issues.

The Dodgers spent most of the early part of the season trying to keep pace with the San Francisco Giants, who established an early lead in the standings and continued to hold at least a share of that lead continuously from April 28 to June 7. At that point the Dodgers overtook the Giants, and for the next month the lead was traded between the two sides five times. The Giants held the lead for the last time on July 7. The Dodgers went 20–6 in July while the Giants went 16–11, allowing the Dodgers to take the league lead on July 8 and hold it until season's last regular game.

The Dodgers lost 10 of their final 13 games from September 16 to 30, while the Giants lost just 6 over the same span. While the schedule says the Dodgers lost the pennant in late September/early October, it was probably lost on July 17 in Cincinnati. That is when star left-hander Sandy Koufax left his start against the Reds in the first inning with a bruised tendon on his finger. Koufax would miss 58 games and approximately 13 starts due to the injury. At the time, Koufax was 14–5 with a league-best 2.15 ERA. The desperate Dodgers brought Koufax back on Sept. 21 when he was clearly not ready. He started three games, but lasted a total of 6 2/3 innings and gave up nine runs and went 0–2 along with a no-decision. However, with seven games remaining the Dodgers were still ahead in the league by four games, and later held a two-game lead with three left to play. They entered their final game with a one-game lead over the Giants, but fell 1–0 to the St. Louis Cardinals. Meanwhile, the Giants won 2–1 over the Houston Colt .45's, after an eighth-inning home run by Willie Mays. These results left the Dodgers and Giants tied in the league at 101–61, necessitating a tie-breaker to decide the NL pennant. The three-game tiebreaker series was considered part of the regular season for statistical purposes. The Giants won game one, while the Dodgers took game two. The Giants then took game three to capture the NL pennant.

== Records and achievements ==
In 1962 two players set Los Angeles Dodgers team records that still stand. Tommy Davis, batting in the heart of the Dodgers' batting order, had a season that in another season might have earned him the National League Most Valuable Player (MVP) award. Davis set Dodger records with 230 hits and 153 runs batted in that have never been matched. In addition, Davis won the National League batting title with a .346 batting average, he scored 120 runs himself, and he also hit 27 doubles and 27 home runs. Davis finished third in the voting for the MVP trophy.

The winner of the MVP was Davis's teammate Maury Wills, who set the all-time Dodger record of 104 stolen bases. This was also a major league season record until it was broken in 1974 by Lou Brock. Wills also led the league in playing in all 165 of the Dodgers' games (including their three-game playoff with the Giants) and with 695 at-bats. The 165 games played in a single season remains an all-time major league record, and is unlikely to be broken under the current major league rules. Wills totaled 208 hits and 130 runs scored, and he also led the league with 10 triples. To top it off, Wills won the Gold Glove at shortstop. All of this impressed the voters for the MVP more than Davis's performance did.

Maury Wills (104) and Willie Davis (32) set an MLB record with the most stolen bases by two teammates with 136. The Dodgers OF consisting of Tommy Davis in LF, Willie Davis in CF and Frank Howard in RF provided most of the power for the Dodgers as Tommy Davis hit 27 HRs with 153 RBIs - Willie Davis (who was voted the NL Sophomore Of the Year in 1962) hit 21 HRs with 85 RBIs and Big Frank Howard jacked 31 HRs with 118 RBIs.

Another Dodger, Don Drysdale, won the Cy Young Award as the best pitcher in Major League Baseball. Drysdale led the league with 25 wins, 41 games started, 19 complete games, 314 innings pitched, and 232 strikeouts. He only suffered nine losses, and he also finished fifth in the voting for the MVP award.

Hall of Famer Sandy Koufax

In addition, a young pitcher named Sandy Koufax had a breakthrough year of a kind for the Dodgers. Koufax led the league with an earned-run average (ERA) of 2.54, and this was first time that he had had an ERA nearly that low, and it was the first of five consecutive years in which he led the league in ERA in just 28 games pitched, Koufax has a won-loss record of 14–7, 11 complete games, and 216 strikeouts.

=== Season standings ===
National League
| Team | W | L | Pct. | GB | Home | Road |
|---|---|---|---|---|---|---|
| San Francisco Giants | 103 | 62 | .624 | — | 61‍–‍21 | 42‍–‍41 |
| Los Angeles Dodgers | 102 | 63 | .618 | 1 | 54‍–‍29 | 48‍–‍34 |
| Cincinnati Reds | 98 | 64 | .605 | 3½ | 58‍–‍23 | 40‍–‍41 |
| Pittsburgh Pirates | 93 | 68 | .578 | 8 | 51‍–‍30 | 42‍–‍38 |
| Milwaukee Braves | 86 | 76 | .531 | 15½ | 49‍–‍32 | 37‍–‍44 |
| St. Louis Cardinals | 84 | 78 | .519 | 17½ | 44‍–‍37 | 40‍–‍41 |
| Philadelphia Phillies | 81 | 80 | .503 | 20 | 46‍–‍34 | 35‍–‍46 |
| Houston Colt .45s | 64 | 96 | .400 | 36½ | 32‍–‍48 | 32‍–‍48 |
| Chicago Cubs | 59 | 103 | .364 | 42½ | 32‍–‍49 | 27‍–‍54 |
| New York Mets | 40 | 120 | .250 | 60½ | 22‍–‍58 | 18‍–‍62 |

=== Record vs. opponents ===
1962 National League record Sources:
| Team | CHC | CIN | HOU | LAD | MIL | NYM | PHI | PIT | SF | STL |
|---|---|---|---|---|---|---|---|---|---|---|
| Chicago | — | 4–14 | 7–11 | 4–14 | 8–10 | 9–9 | 10–8 | 4–14 | 6–12 | 7–11 |
| Cincinnati | 14–4 | — | 13–5 | 9–9 | 13–5 | 13–5 | 8–10 | 13–5 | 7–11 | 8–10 |
| Houston | 11–7 | 5–13 | — | 6–12 | 7–11 | 13–3–1 | 1–17 | 5–13 | 7–11 | 9–9–1 |
| Los Angeles | 14–4 | 9–9 | 12–6 | — | 10–8 | 16–2 | 14–4 | 10–8 | 10–11 | 7–11 |
| Milwaukee | 10–8 | 5–13 | 11–7 | 8–10 | — | 12–6 | 11–7 | 10–8 | 7–11 | 12–6 |
| New York | 9–9 | 5–13 | 3–13–1 | 2–16 | 6–12 | — | 4–14 | 2–16 | 4–14 | 5–13 |
| Philadelphia | 8–10 | 10–8 | 17–1 | 4–14 | 7–11 | 14–4 | — | 7–10 | 5–13 | 9–9 |
| Pittsburgh | 14–4 | 5–13 | 13–5 | 8–10 | 8–10 | 16–2 | 10–7 | — | 7–11 | 12–6 |
| San Francisco | 12–6 | 11–7 | 11–7 | 11–10 | 11–7 | 14–4 | 13–5 | 11–7 | — | 9–9 |
| St. Louis | 11–7 | 10–8 | 9–9–1 | 11–7 | 6–12 | 13–5 | 9–9 | 6–12 | 9–9 | — |

=== Opening Day lineup ===
Opening Day starters
| Name | Position |
|---|---|
| Maury Wills | Shortstop |
| Jim Gilliam | Second baseman |
| Wally Moon | Left fielder |
| Duke Snider | Right fielder |
| John Roseboro | Catcher |
| Ron Fairly | First baseman |
| Daryl Spencer | Third baseman |
| Willie Davis | Center fielder |
| Johnny Podres | Starting pitcher |

=== Roster ===
1962 Los Angeles Dodgers
Roster
| Pitchers: 53 Don Drysdale; 23 Willard Hunter; 32 Sandy Koufax; 38 Joe Moeller; 17 Phil Ortega; 16 Ron Perranoski; 22 Johnny Podres; 45 Pete Richert; 37 Ed Roebuck; 51 Larry Sherry; 41 Jack Smith; 40 Stan Williams | Catchers: 35 Doug Camilli; 8 John Roseboro; 34 Norm Sherry; Infielders: 11 Larry Burright; 21 Andy Carey; 6 Ron Fairly; 19 Jim Gilliam; 15 Tim Harkness; 20 Daryl Spencer; 44 Dick Tracewski; 30 Maury Wills | Outfielders: 12 Tommy Davis; 3 Willie Davis; 25 Frank Howard; 14 Ken McMullen; 9 Wally Moon; 4 Duke Snider; 7 Lee Walls | Manager: 24 Walter Alston; Coaches: 33 Joe Becker; 2 Leo Durocher; 31 Greg Mulleavy; 27 Pete Reiser |

== Player stats ==
| = Indicates team leader |

| = Indicates league leader |

=== Batting ===
==== Starters by position ====
Note: Pos = Position; G = Games played; AB = At bats; H = Hits; Avg. = Batting average; HR = Home runs; RBI = Runs batted in; SB = Stolen Bases

| Pos | Player | G | AB | H | Avg. | HR | RBI | SB |
|---|---|---|---|---|---|---|---|---|
| C | John Roseboro | 128 | 389 | 97 | .249 | 7 | 55 | 12 |
| 1B | Ron Fairly | 147 | 460 | 128 | .278 | 14 | 71 | 1 |
| 2B | Jim Gilliam | 160 | 588 | 159 | .270 | 4 | 43 | 17 |
| 3B | Daryl Spencer | 77 | 157 | 37 | .236 | 2 | 12 | 0 |
| SS | Maury Wills | 165 | 695 | 208 | .299 | 6 | 48 | 104 |
| LF | Tommy Davis | 163 | 665 | 230 | .346 | 27 | 153 | 18 |
| CF | Willie Davis | 157 | 600 | 171 | .285 | 21 | 85 | 32 |
| RF | Frank Howard | 141 | 493 | 146 | .296 | 31 | 119 | 1 |

==== Other batters ====
Note: G = Games played; AB = At bats; H = Hits; Avg. = Batting average; HR = Home runs; RBI = Runs batted in

| Player | G | AB | H | Avg. | HR | RBI |
|---|---|---|---|---|---|---|
| Larry Burright | 115 | 249 | 51 | .205 | 4 | 30 |
| Wally Moon | 95 | 244 | 59 | .242 | 4 | 31 |
| Duke Snider | 80 | 158 | 44 | .278 | 5 | 30 |
| Andy Carey | 53 | 111 | 26 | .234 | 2 | 13 |
| Lee Walls | 60 | 109 | 29 | .266 | 0 | 17 |
| Doug Camilli | 45 | 88 | 25 | .284 | 4 | 22 |
| Norm Sherry | 35 | 88 | 16 | .182 | 3 | 16 |
| Tim Harkness | 92 | 62 | 16 | .258 | 2 | 7 |
| Ken McMullen | 6 | 11 | 3 | .273 | 0 | 0 |
| Dick Tracewski | 15 | 2 | 0 | .000 | 0 | 0 |

=== Pitching ===
| = Indicates league leader |

==== Starting pitchers ====
Note: G = Games pitched; IP = Innings pitched; W = Wins; L = Losses; ERA = Earned run average; SO = Strikeouts

| Player | G | IP | W | L | ERA | SO |
|---|---|---|---|---|---|---|
| Don Drysdale | 43 | 314.0 | 25 | 9 | 2.83 | 232 |
| Johnny Podres | 43 | 255.0 | 15 | 13 | 3.81 | 178 |
| Stan Williams | 40 | 185.2 | 14 | 12 | 4.46 | 108 |
| Sandy Koufax | 28 | 184.0 | 14 | 7 | 2.54 | 216 |

==== Other pitchers ====
Note: G = Games pitched; IP = Innings pitched; W = Wins; L = Losses; ERA = Earned run average; SO = Strikeouts

| Player | G | IP | W | L | ERA | SO |
|---|---|---|---|---|---|---|
| Joe Moeller | 19 | 85.2 | 6 | 5 | 5.25 | 46 |
| Pete Richert | 19 | 81.1 | 5 | 4 | 3.87 | 75 |
| Phil Ortega | 24 | 53.2 | 0 | 2 | 6.88 | 30 |

==== Relief pitchers ====
Note: G = Games pitched; W = Wins; L = Losses; SV = Saves; ERA = Earned run average; SO = Strikeouts

| Player | G | W | L | SV | ERA | SO |
|---|---|---|---|---|---|---|
| Ron Perranoski | 70 | 6 | 6 | 19 | 2.85 | 68 |
| Ed Roebuck | 64 | 10 | 2 | 9 | 3.09 | 72 |
| Larry Sherry | 58 | 7 | 3 | 11 | 3.20 | 71 |
| Jack Smith | 8 | 0 | 0 | 1 | 4.50 | 7 |
| Willard Hunter | 1 | 0 | 0 | 0 | 40.50 | 1 |

== Awards and honors ==
- National League Most Valuable Player
  - Maury Wills
- Cy Young Award
  - Don Drysdale
- Associated Press Athlete of the Year
  - Maury Wills
- Gold Glove Award
  - Maury Wills
- NL Player of the Month
  - Sandy Koufax (June 1962)
  - Frank Howard (July 1962)

=== Sporting News awards ===
- TSN Pitcher of the Year Award
  - Don Drysdale
- TSN Major League Player of the Year Award
  - Maury Wills & Don Drysdale
- TSN National League Player of the Year Award
  - Maury Wills

=== All-Stars ===
- 1962 Major League Baseball All-Star Game −1st Game
  - Don Drysdale starter
  - Tommy Davis starter
  - Sandy Koufax reserve
  - John Roseboro reserve
  - Maury Wills reserve
- 1962 Major League Baseball All-Star Game – 2nd Game
  - Johnny Podres starter
  - Tommy Davis starter
  - John Roseboro reserve
  - Maury Wills reserve
- Major League Baseball All-Star Game MVP Award – Game 1
  - Maury Wills
- TSN National League All-Star
  - Don Drysdale
  - Tommy Davis
  - Maury Wills

== Farm system ==
| Level | Team | League | Manager |
|---|---|---|---|
| AAA | Omaha Dodgers | American Association | Danny Ozark |
| AAA | Spokane Indians | Pacific Coast League | Preston Gómez |
| A | Greenville Spinners | South Atlantic League | Roy Hartsfield |
| B | Salem Dodgers | Northwest League | Stan Wasiak |
| C | Great Falls Electrics | Pioneer League | Al Ronning |
| C | Reno Silver Sox | California League | Roy Smalley |
| D | Keokuk Dodgers/Midwest Dodgers | Midwest League | Ed Serrano |
| D | Ozark Dodgers/Andalusia Dodgers | Alabama–Florida League | George Scherger |
| D | St. Petersburg Saints | Florida State League | Spider Jorgensen |
