= Tom Butters (athletic director) =

American baseball player and college sports administrator (1938–2016)

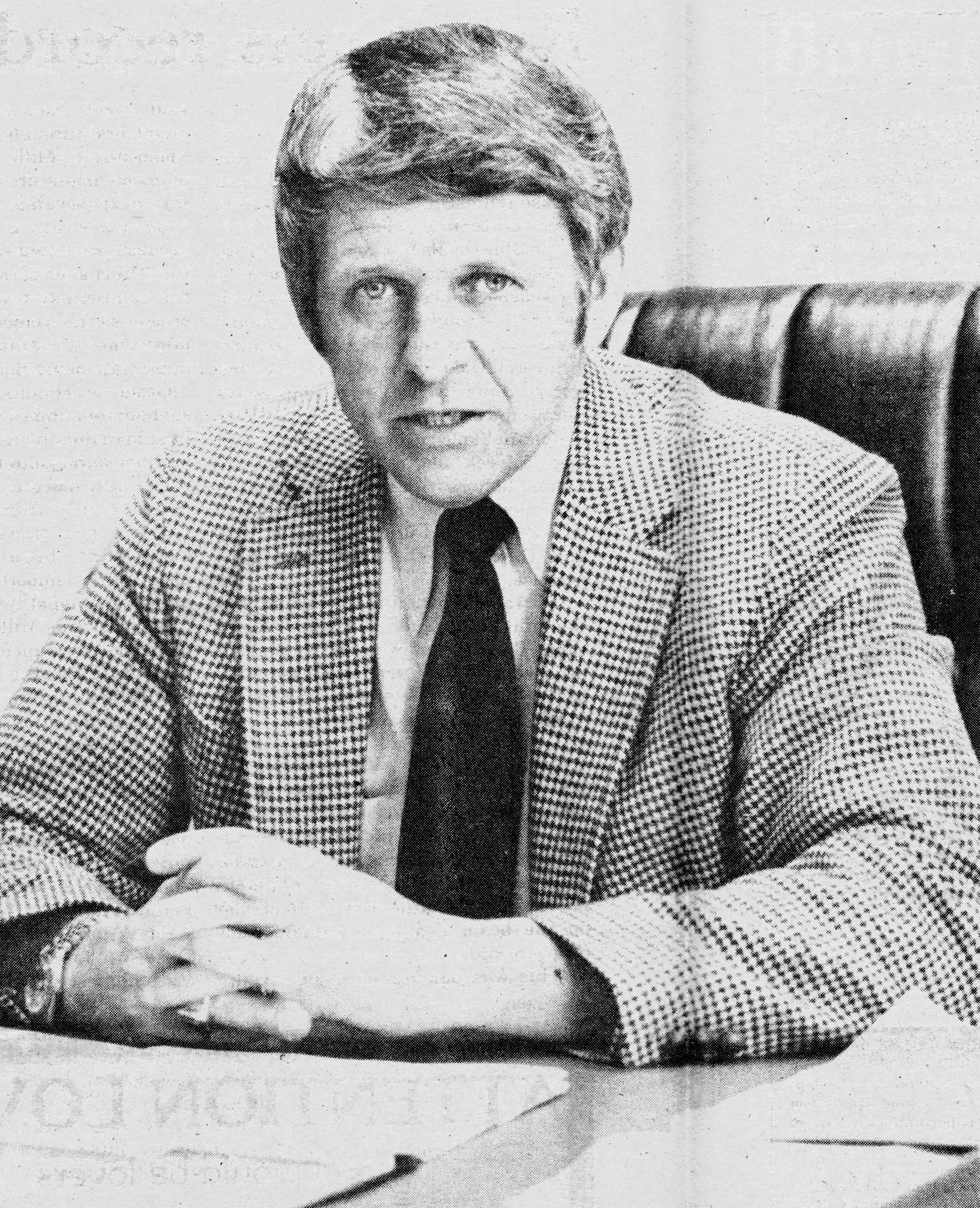
- Butters as Duke's athletic director in 1983
- Pitcher
- Born: April 8, 1938; Delaware, Ohio, U.S.
- Died: March 31, 2016 (aged 77); Durham, North Carolina, U.S.
- Batted: Right Threw: Right

MLB debut
- September 8, 1962, for the Pittsburgh Pirates

Last MLB appearance
- May 20, 1965, for the Pittsburgh Pirates

MLB statistics
- Win–loss record: 2–3
- Earned run average: 3.10
- Strikeouts: 85
- Stats at Baseball Reference

Teams
- Pittsburgh Pirates (1962–1965)

Thomas Arden Butters (April 8, 1938 – March 31, 2016) was an American professional baseball player who spent parts of four seasons in Major League Baseball (MLB) with the Pittsburgh Pirates, then had a lengthy career as a college sports administrator at Duke University. He is best remembered for his time at Duke and for being a key figure in the financial success of the NCAA Division I men's basketball tournament.

== Biography ==
=== Baseball career ===
Butters was a native of Delaware, Ohio, who attended Ohio Wesleyan University in his native city. In baseball, he was a 6 ft 2 in (1.88 m), 195 lb (88 kg) right-handed pitcher. He signed with the Pittsburgh Pirates in 1957 after being scouted by retired Pirates' general manager Branch Rickey, also an Ohio Wesleyan alumnus.

Butters required almost six full years of minor league seasoning before being called up by the Pirates in September 1962. He then spent parts of the next three seasons in Major League Baseball (MLB), including most of 1964. In 28 games pitched for the 1964 Pirates, including four starts, Butters had a 2–2 win–loss record and posted a 2.38 earned run average (ERA).

En route to spring training with his young family in 1965, Butters suffered a severe whiplash injury in an automobile accident. He spent most of 1965 on the disabled list and cut short an attempted comeback in 1966 when the effects of his injury proved insurmountable. In 43 career MLB games pitched, Butters compiled a 2–3 record, striking out 85 batters and issuing 56 bases on balls in 95 2/3 innings pitched with a 3.10 ERA.

=== College sports administrator ===
A United States Army veteran, Butters had also spent baseball off-seasons working in admissions for his alma mater, Ohio Wesleyan. In 1967, he joined Duke University as director of special events, then served three years (1968–1970) as head baseball coach before moving into administration.

Butters served as the athletic director at Duke from 1977 to 1997. Three years into that tenure, he hired Mike Krzyzewski as coach of the Duke Blue Devils men's basketball program; Krzyzewski went on to become the winningest coach in men's Division I history. During his two decades as head of Duke intercollegiate athletics, Butters supervised programs that won 40 Atlantic Coast Conference (ACC) team titles.

In addition to serving as athletic director, Butters was director of the "Iron Dukes" (the fundraising organization for the school's athletics), associate athletic director, assistant to the chancellor, and vice president of the university. During Butters' 1989–1994 tenure on the NCAA's basketball committee, including two years as chairman, he was part of the negotiating team that brokered a $1 billion contract with CBS Sports to televise the annual "March Madness" men's basketball tournament.

Butters was elected to the North Carolina Sports Hall of Fame in 2008 and the Duke Sports Hall of Fame in 1999, and received the Robert Strimer Honor Award from Ohio Wesleyan in 1998. Butters died in 2016; he was survived by his wife and two children.
