= Amado Samuel =

Dominican baseball player (born 1938)

- Shortstop / Second baseman / Third baseman
- Born: December 6, 1938; San Pedro de Macorís, Dominican Republic
- Batted: Right Threw: Right

MLB debut
- April 10, 1962, for the Milwaukee Braves

Last MLB appearance
- July 11, 1964, for the New York Mets

MLB statistics
- Batting average: .215
- Home runs: 3
- Runs batted in: 25
- Stats at Baseball Reference

Teams
- Milwaukee Braves (1962–1963); New York Mets (1964)

Amado Samuel (born Amado Ruperto Samuel) is a Dominican former Major League Baseball (MLB) shortstop, second baseman, and third baseman. Samuel signed with the Milwaukee Braves as a free agent in 1958. He would play at the Major League level with the team in 1962 and in 1963 before being purchased by the New York Mets that year. He would play at the Major League level with the Mets in 1964.
