= Ethan Blackaby =

American baseball player (1940–2022)

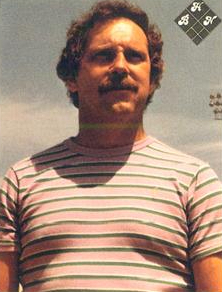
- Blackaby c. 1983
- Outfielder
- Born: July 24, 1940; Cincinnati, Ohio, U.S.
- Died: January 16, 2022 (aged 81); Phoenix, Arizona, U.S.
- Batted: Left Threw: Left

MLB debut
- September 6, 1962, for the Milwaukee Braves

Last MLB appearance
- October 4, 1964, for the Milwaukee Braves

MLB statistics
- Batting average: .120
- Home runs: 0
- Runs batted in: 1
- Stats at Baseball Reference

Teams
- Milwaukee Braves (1962, 1964)

Ethan Allen Blackaby (July 24, 1940 – January 16, 2022) was an American professional baseball player who was an outfielder in Major League Baseball, appearing in 15 games for the Milwaukee Braves during the 1962 and 1964 seasons. He threw and batted left-handed, stood 5 feet 11 inches (1.80 m) tall and weighed 190 pounds (86 kg).

Born in Cincinnati, Ohio, Blackaby attended Canton, Illinois, High School, where he was a multi-sport standout athlete. He played baseball and football at the University of Illinois at Urbana–Champaign before signing with the Braves in 1961. His nine-year professional career included 1,073 games in minor league baseball, punctuated by his two trials with the Braves in the closing weeks of the 1962 and 1964 campaigns, when MLB rosters expanded to 40 players. In his debut on September 6, 1962, he doubled in his first MLB at bat against Ernie Broglio of the St. Louis Cardinals. He had entered the game as a pinch hitter for Braves' catcher Bob Uecker, who later became both a film and television actor and Baseball Hall of Fame play-by-play broadcaster. Blackaby collected only two other hits in the majors, both singles, in 25 at bats over his two brief trials.

After his playing days were over, Blackaby was part-owner and general manager of the Phoenix Giants of the Triple-A Pacific Coast League in the 1970s and early 1980s.

Blackaby died on January 16, 2022, at the age of 81.
