= Cecil Butler (baseball) =

American baseball player (1937–2019)

- Pitcher
- Born: October 23, 1937; Dallas, Georgia, U.S.
- Died: October 2, 2019 (aged 81); Dallas, Georgia, U.S.
- Batted: Right Threw: Right

MLB debut
- April 23, 1962, for the Milwaukee Braves

Last MLB appearance
- July 25, 1964, for the Milwaukee Braves

MLB statistics
- Win–loss record: 2–0
- Earned run average: 3.31
- Strikeouts: 24
- Innings pitched: 351/3
- Stats at Baseball Reference

Teams
- Milwaukee Braves (1962, 1964)

Cecil Dean Butler (October 23, 1937 – October 2, 2019) was an American Major League Baseball (MLB) pitcher. The right-hander worked in 11 games, including two starting assignments, for the Milwaukee Braves in 1962 and 1964. Nicknamed "Slewfoot," he was born in Dallas, Georgia, stood 6 feet 4 inches (1.93 m) tall and weighed 195 pounds (88 kg).

Butler's professional baseball career lasted for nine seasons (1957–65), all in the Braves' organization. He won a spot on the 1962 Milwaukee roster out of spring training and in his second MLB appearance, he worked 41/3 innings of three-hit relief on April 28 against the newly formed Houston Colt .45s at Colt Stadium. His scoreless effort netted him his first big-league win, as the Braves rallied from a 3–2 deficit to come back and prevail, 9–3. Fifteen days later, he started against the National League's other expansion team, the New York Mets, at the Polo Grounds, and threw a six-hit, complete game victory, 3–2.

But after another start on May 19, he suffered a severe elbow injury, and was very slow to recover. Butler made two appearances with the Braves over the final four months of 1962, spent 1963 in the minor leagues, and then got into two more games for Milwaukee in July 1964, but was ineffective. He retired after the 1965 season due to his injury.

In his 11 MLB games, Butler allowed 33 hits and nine bases on balls in 351/3 innings pitched, with 24 strikeouts. He finished with a 2–0 record and a 3.31 earned run average.

Butler died at his home on October 2, 2019, in Dallas, Georgia.
