= Jack Hamilton (baseball) =

American baseball player (1938–2018)

- Pitcher
- Born: December 25, 1938; Burlington, Iowa, U.S.
- Died: February 22, 2018 (aged 79); Branson, Missouri, U.S.
- Batted: Right Threw: Right

MLB debut
- April 13, 1962, for the Philadelphia Phillies

Last MLB appearance
- August 10, 1969, for the Chicago White Sox

MLB statistics
- Win–loss record: 32–40
- Earned run average: 4.53
- Strikeouts: 357
- Stats at Baseball Reference

Teams
- Philadelphia Phillies (1962–1963); Detroit Tigers (1964–1965); New York Mets (1966–1967); California Angels (1967–1968); Cleveland Indians (1969); Chicago White Sox (1969)

Jack Edwin Hamilton (December 25, 1938 – February 22, 2018) was an American professional baseball pitcher, who played in Major League Baseball (MLB), from 1962–1969, for the Philadelphia Phillies, Detroit Tigers, New York Mets, California Angels, Cleveland Indians, and Chicago White Sox.

== Professional career ==
Originally signed by the St. Louis Cardinals as a free agent, Hamilton debuted in MLB as a starting pitcher for the Phillies in 1962 and posted a 9–12 record with an earned run average of 5.09. Pitching for the Mets on May 4, 1966, Hamilton tossed a one-hitter against the Cardinals in St. Louis; the one hit being a bunt single by opposing pitcher Ray Sadecki. He showed more promise pitching out of the bullpen, and spent most of his career as a relief pitcher until his retirement in 1969, although he was converted back to a starting pitcher for the 1966 and 1967 seasons. In 1967, Hamilton was traded by the Mets to the Angels.

=== Tony Conigliaro beaning incident ===
On August 18, 1967, the Angels were playing the Boston Red Sox in a game that would have important implications for the American League (AL) pennant race. While facing outfielder Tony Conigliaro, Hamilton hit him with a pitch on his left cheekbone that fractured both his cheekbone and eye socket, and severely damaged his retina. Conigliaro nearly died, and the damage to his vision kept him off the field the remainder of the year and all of 1968. Conigliaro made a promising-but-brief comeback in 1969–1970, until his vision problems returned, which eventually forced his early retirement from baseball in 1975 at age 30. Amid ongoing health issues, Conigliaro died in 1990 at age 45.

Hamilton retired in 1969, finishing his career with the White Sox.

== Personal life ==
Jack was born on December 25, 1938, in Morning Sun, Iowa, the son of Cecil and Myrtle Baird Hamilton. When Jack retired, he and his wife Jan got into the restaurant business, opening eateries in various cities including his hometown of Morning Sun, IA. He and his wife moved to Branson in 1986 and he was owner of Jack & Tommy’s and the Pzazz Restaurants. In Branson, Jack had a restaurant called Jack and Tommy’s. When that closed, he started Pzazz, which was in business for nearly 30 years. Pzazz was located in four different locations in Branson including Pointe Royale, and the top of the Plaza towers.

== Sources ==
- 1958 Baseball Guide, published by The Sporting News, p. 349.
- 1968 Baseball Register published by The Sporting News.
- Passan, Jeff, "Accidental villain" (August 17, 2007), Yahoo! Sports. Retrieved on August 17, 2007.
