= Harvey Branch =

American baseball player (born 1939)

- Pitcher
- Born: February 8, 1937; Memphis, Tennessee, U.S.
- Died: January 15, 2021 (aged 83); Memphis, Tennessee, U.S.
- Batted: Right Threw: Left

MLB debut
- September 18, 1962, for the St. Louis Cardinals

Last MLB appearance
- September 18, 1962, for the St. Louis Cardinals

MLB statistics
- Win–loss record: 0–1
- Earned run average: 5.40
- Strikeouts: 2
- Stats at Baseball Reference

Teams
- St. Louis Cardinals (1962)

Harvey Alfred Branch (February 8, 1937—January 15, 2021) was an American professional baseball player. He was a left-handed pitcher who had a seven-year career in minor league baseball, but whose Major League tenure consisted of a single game in the uniform of the St. Louis Cardinals on September 18, 1962.

Branch attended Alabama State University where he played college baseball and basketball for the Hornets. He stood 6 feet (1.8 m) tall and weighed 170 pounds (77 kg). He originally signed with the Chicago Cubs in 1958 and spent five years in their minor league system. In 1962, after Branch enjoyed a second consecutive successful season with the Double-A San Antonio Missions — recording 216 strikeouts in 237 innings pitched — the Cubs traded him to the Cardinals on September 1 for right-handed pitcher Paul Toth.

Seventeen days later, Branch made his MLB appearance as the Cardinals' starting pitcher — against Toth and the Cubs at Wrigley Field. He yielded a solo home run to Ron Santo in the second inning, walked in a run in the third, and gave up a third run on a triple and a ground ball out in the fifth. He left the game for a pinch hitter, Red Schoendienst, in the top of the sixth inning with St. Louis trailing, 3–1. Branch was the losing pitcher in an eventual 4–3 Redbird defeat. (Toth got the victory.) All told, Branch yielded five hits and three earned runs in his five innings of work, with five walks and two strikeouts. Those would also stand as his career MLB totals.

Branch made the Cardinals' 40-man spring training roster in 1963 but was sent to the Triple-A Atlanta Crackers for the full season. After spending that year and 1964 in the minor leagues, Branch left the game.

Branch died on January 15, 2021.
