= Bill Smith (pitcher) =

American baseball player (1934–1997)

- Pitcher
- Born: June 8, 1934; Washington, D.C., U.S.
- Died: March 30, 1997 (aged 62); Clinton, Maryland, U.S.
- Batted: Left Threw: Left

MLB debut
- September 13, 1958, for the St. Louis Cardinals

Last MLB appearance
- September 28, 1962, for the Philadelphia Phillies

MLB statistics
- Win–loss record: 1–6
- Earned run average: 4.21
- Strikeouts: 34
- Stats at Baseball Reference

Teams
- St. Louis Cardinals (1958–1959); Philadelphia Phillies (1962)

William Garland Smith (June 8, 1934 – March 30, 1997) was an American professional baseball player, a left-handed pitcher whose 12 years as a professional (1953–64) included parts of three seasons in the Major Leagues for the St. Louis Cardinals (1958–59) and Philadelphia Phillies (1962). Born in Washington, D.C., Smith batted left-handed, stood 6 feet (1.83 m) tall and weighed 190 pounds (86.2 kg).

Smith signed originally with the Cardinals, and won 130 games during his minor league career, with six seasons of ten or more wins. He appeared in 24 games played during his three Major League stints, six as a starting pitcher. His one big-league victory came on June 28, 1962, at Candlestick Park when he relieved starter Jim Owens in the second inning and threw 7 2/3 innings of shutout ball. The Phils eventually overtook the San Francisco Giants, 7–2. Smith bested a future Baseball Hall of Fame pitcher in Juan Marichal on that day, and helped his cause with an RBI double off the Giants' pitcher.

All told, Smith lost six of seven Major League decisions, and gave up 82 hits and 17 bases on balls in 68 1/3 innings of work. He struck out 34.
