= Paul Brown (baseball) =

American baseball player (born 1941)

- Pitcher
- Born: June 18, 1941 (age 85); Fort Smith, Arkansas, U.S.
- Batted: Right Threw: Right

MLB debut
- July 23, 1961, for the Philadelphia Phillies

Last MLB appearance
- July 6, 1968, for the Philadelphia Phillies

MLB statistics
- Win–loss record: 0–8
- Earned run average: 6.00
- Strikeouts: 45
- Stats at Baseball Reference

Teams
- Philadelphia Phillies (1961–1963, 1968)

Paul Dwayne Brown (born June 18, 1941) is an American former professional baseball pitcher, who played in Major League Baseball (MLB) for the Philadelphia Phillies (1961–1963, 1968). During his playing days, Brown stood 6 ft 1 in (1.85 m) tall, weighing 190 lb (86 kg). He threw and batted right-handed.

Brown was born in Fort Smith, Arkansas, raised in Holdenville, Oklahoma, graduated from high school at Moss Public School, and attended the University of Oklahoma. His younger brother, Jackie Brown, was a big league pitcher and pitching coach. Paul Brown is the father of former minor-league hurler Daren Brown, who was the interim manager of the 2010 Seattle Mariners and has been a manager or coach in the Seattle organization since 2001.

Brown spent all but seven games of his entire eight-year (1960–1965, 1967–1968) professional baseball career in the Phillies' system. In parts of four MLB seasons, he posted an 0–8 record, with a 6.00 earned run average (ERA), in 36 appearances, including 12 starts and one save. Brown surrendered 62 earned runs, on 108 hits, and 47 walks, while striking out 45, in 93 innings pitched.

When the Phillies invited Tommy John to spring training while they scouted him in 1961, John became friends with Brown. "He was an outstanding pitcher and a nice young man," John remembered.

== See also ==
- Philadelphia Phillies all-time roster
