= 1962 Major League Baseball All-Star Game =

1962 Major League Baseball All-Star Game may refer to:

- The 1962 Major League Baseball All-Star Game (first game), a 3–1 victory for the National League over the American League
- The 1962 Major League Baseball All-Star Game (second game), a 9–4 victory for the American League over the National League
