= 1962 Major League Baseball season =

1962 MLB season
- League: American League (AL); National League (NL)
- Sport: Baseball
- Duration: Regular season: April 9 – September 30, 1962 (AL); April 9 – October 3, 1962 (NL); World Series: October 4–16, 1962
- Games: 162
- Teams: 20 (10 per league)
- TV partner(s): NBC, CBS

Regular season
- Season MVP: AL: Mickey Mantle (NYY); NL: Maury Wills (LAD)
- AL champions: New York Yankees
- AL runners-up: Minnesota Twins
- NL champions: San Francisco Giants
- NL runners-up: Los Angeles Dodgers

World Series
- Champions: New York Yankees
- Runners-up: San Francisco Giants
- World Series MVP: Ralph Terry (NYY)

MLB seasons
- ← 1961 1963 →

Locations of teams for the 1962–1964 American League seasons
American League
Locations of teams for the 1962–1963 National League seasons
National League

The 1962 major league baseball season began on April 9, 1962. The regular season ended on October 3, with the San Francisco Giants and New York Yankees as the regular season champions of the National League and American League, respectively. The Giants defeated the Los Angeles Dodgers in a regular season best-of-three tiebreaker, for the National League title in three games, after both teams finished their 162-game schedules with identical 101–61 records. This was the fifth regular season tie-breaker. The postseason began with Game 1 of the 59th World Series on October 4 and ended with Game 7 on October 16. In the seventh iteration of this World Series matchup, and their first since the Giants relocated to San Francisco from New York, the Yankees defeated the Giants, four games to three, capturing their 20th championship in franchise history, winning back-to-back World Series.

For the fourth and final year, there were two separate All-Star Games played. The first, the 32nd All-Star Game, was held on July 11 at District of Columbia Stadium in Washington, D.C., home of the Washington Senators. The National League won, 3–1. The second, the 33rd All-Star Game, was held on July 31 at Wrigley Field in Chicago, Illinois, home of the Chicago Cubs. The American League won, 9–4.

In response to the proposed Continental League, the National League announced expansion during the 1960 World Series, with a new team in Houston, Texas and a new team in New York City. The 1962 season would see the Houston Colt .45s and New York Mets enfranchised, the latter being the National League's return to New York City after a four-year absence.

== Schedule ==
The 1962 schedule consisted of 162 games for all teams in the American League and National League, each of which had 10 teams. Each team was scheduled to play 18 games against the other nine teams of their respective league. The 162-game, 18 games per team format had previously been used by the American League since the previous season due to expansion and was the first season that the National League used it due to their own expansion. The format would be used until 1969.

Opening Day took place on April 9, featuring four teams. The final day of the scheduled regular season was on October 1, which saw all 20 teams play, the first time all existing teams played on the final day since 1960. Due to the Los Angeles Dodgers and San Francisco Giants finishing with the same record of 101–61, a best-of-three tie-breaker was scheduled, to be considered an extension of the regular season, and took place between October 1 and October 3. The World Series took place between October 4 and October 16.

== Rule change ==
The 1962 season saw the following rule change:

- The bonus rule, previously implemented from 1947–1950 and 1953–1957, was implemented for the third and final time (to be permanently rescinded in June 1965). This version of the rule was slightly different, allowing teams to only option to the minor leagues one first-year player. Additional players would be required to stay in the major leagues or pass through waivers. To claim a bonus player on waivers, a team must spend $8,000 (equivalent to $85,100 in 2025).

== Teams ==
League	Team	City	Ballpark	Capacity	Manager
American League	Baltimore Orioles	Baltimore, Maryland	Baltimore Memorial Stadium	49,373	Billy Hitchcock
American League	Boston Red Sox	Boston, Massachusetts	Fenway Park	33,357	Pinky Higgins
American League	Chicago White Sox	Chicago, Illinois	White Sox Park	46,550	Al López
American League	Cleveland Indians	Cleveland, Ohio	Cleveland Stadium	73,811	Mel McGaha
American League	Detroit Tigers	Detroit, Michigan	Tiger Stadium	52,850	Bob Scheffing
American League	Kansas City Athletics	Kansas City, Missouri	Municipal Stadium	34,165	Hank Bauer
American League	Los Angeles Angels	Los Angeles, California	Dodger Stadium (Note: Dodger Stadium was referred to as "Chavez Ravine Stadium" by the Angels during their tenure.)	56,000	Bill Rigney
American League	Minnesota Twins	Bloomington, Minnesota	Metropolitan Stadium	39,525	Sam Mele
American League	New York Yankees	New York, New York	Yankee Stadium	67,337	Ralph Houk
American League	Washington Senators	Washington, D.C.	District of Columbia Stadium	43,500	Mickey Vernon
National League	Chicago Cubs	Chicago, Illinois	Wrigley Field	36,755	College of Coaches
National League	Cincinnati Reds	Cincinnati, Ohio	Crosley Field	30,322	Fred Hutchinson
National League	Houston Colt .45s	Houston, Texas	Colt Stadium	32,601	Harry Craft
National League	Los Angeles Dodgers	Los Angeles, California	Dodger Stadium	56,000	Walter Alston
National League	Milwaukee Braves	Milwaukee, Wisconsin	Milwaukee County Stadium	43,768	Birdie Tebbetts
National League	New York Mets	New York, New York	Polo Grounds	56,000	Casey Stengel
National League	Philadelphia Phillies	Philadelphia, Pennsylvania	Connie Mack Stadium	33,608	Gene Mauch
National League	Pittsburgh Pirates	Pittsburgh, Pennsylvania	Forbes Field	35,500	Danny Murtaugh
National League	San Francisco Giants	San Francisco, California	Candlestick Park	42,553	Alvin Dark
National League	St. Louis Cardinals	St. Louis, Missouri	Busch Stadium	30,500	Johnny Keane

== Standings ==
=== American League ===
American League
Team	W	L	Pct.	GB	Home	Road
New York Yankees	96	66	.593	—	50‍–‍30	46‍–‍36
Minnesota Twins	91	71	.562	5	45‍–‍36	46‍–‍35
Los Angeles Angels	86	76	.531	10	40‍–‍41	46‍–‍35
Detroit Tigers	85	76	.528	10½	49‍–‍33	36‍–‍43
Chicago White Sox	85	77	.525	11	43‍–‍38	42‍–‍39
Cleveland Indians	80	82	.494	16	43‍–‍38	37‍–‍44
Baltimore Orioles	77	85	.475	19	44‍–‍38	33‍–‍47
Boston Red Sox	76	84	.475	19	39‍–‍40	37‍–‍44
Kansas City Athletics	72	90	.444	24	39‍–‍42	33‍–‍48
Washington Senators	60	101	.373	35½	27‍–‍53	33‍–‍48

=== National League ===
National League
Team	W	L	Pct.	GB	Home	Road
San Francisco Giants	103	62	.624	—	61‍–‍21	42‍–‍41
Los Angeles Dodgers	102	63	.618	1	54‍–‍29	48‍–‍34
Cincinnati Reds	98	64	.605	3½	58‍–‍23	40‍–‍41
Pittsburgh Pirates	93	68	.578	8	51‍–‍30	42‍–‍38
Milwaukee Braves	86	76	.531	15½	49‍–‍32	37‍–‍44
St. Louis Cardinals	84	78	.519	17½	44‍–‍37	40‍–‍41
Philadelphia Phillies	81	80	.503	20	46‍–‍34	35‍–‍46
Houston Colt .45s	64	96	.400	36½	32‍–‍48	32‍–‍48
Chicago Cubs	59	103	.364	42½	32‍–‍49	27‍–‍54
New York Mets	40	120	.250	60½	22‍–‍58	18‍–‍62

- The San Francisco Giants defeated the Los Angeles Dodgers in a best-of-three tie-breaker series to earn the National League pennant.

=== Tie games ===
3 tie games (1 in AL, 2 in NL), which are not factored into winning percentage or games behind (and were often replayed again) occurred throughout the season.

==== American League ====
The Minnesota Twins and Washington Senators had one each.

- August 22, Minnesota Twins vs. Washington Senators, tied at 8 after 10 innings on account of curfew.

==== National League ====
The Houston Colt .45s had two tie games. The New York Mets and St. Louis Cardinals had one each.

- April 25, Houston Colt .45s vs. St. Louis Cardinals, tied at 5 after 17 innings on account of curfew.
- September 9, Houston Colt .45s vs. New York Mets, tied at 7 after a shortened eight innings on account of 7:00 p.m. curfew.

== Postseason ==
The postseason began on October 1 and ended on October 16 with the New York Yankees defeating the San Francisco Giants in the 1962 World Series in seven games.

=== Bracket ===
National League playoff			World Series
			AL	NY Yankees	4
NL	San Francisco	2	NL	San Francisco	3
NL	LA Dodgers	1

== Managerial changes ==
=== Off-season ===
Team	Former Manager	New Manager
Baltimore Orioles	Lum Harris	Billy Hitchcock
Cleveland Indians	Mel Harder	Mel McGaha
Houston Colt .45s	Team enfranchised	Harry Craft
New York Mets	Team enfranchised	Casey Stengel

=== In-season ===
Team	Former Manager	New Manager
Cleveland Indians	Mel McGaha	Mel Harder

== League leaders ==
=== American League ===
Hitting leaders
Stat	Player	Total
AVG	Pete Runnels (BOS)	.326
OPS	Mickey Mantle (NYY)	1.091
HR	Harmon Killebrew (MIN)	48
RBI	Harmon Killebrew (MIN)	126
R	Albie Pearson (LAA)	115
H	Bobby Richardson (NYY)	209
SB	Luis Aparicio (CWS)	31

Pitching leaders
Stat	Player	Total
W	Ralph Terry (NYY)	23
L	Chuck Estrada (BAL); Ed Rakow (KCA)	17
ERA	Hank Aguirre (DET)	2.21
K	Camilo Pascual (MIN)	206
IP	Ralph Terry (NYY)	298.2
SV	Dick Radatz (BOS)	24
WHIP	Hank Aguirre (DET)	1.051

=== National League ===
Hitting leaders
Stat	Player	Total
AVG	Tommy Davis (LAD)	.346
OPS	Frank Robinson (CIN)	1.045
HR	Willie Mays (SF)	49
RBI	Tommy Davis (LAD)	153
R	Frank Robinson (CIN)	134
H	Tommy Davis (LAD)	230
SB	Maury Wills (LAD)	104

Pitching leaders
Stat	Player	Total
W	Don Drysdale (LAD)	25
L	Roger Craig (NYM)	24
ERA	Sandy Koufax (LAD)	2.54
K	Don Drysdale (LAD)	232
IP	Don Drysdale (LAD)	314.1
SV	Roy Face (PIT)	28
WHIP	Sandy Koufax (LAD)	1.036

== Milestones ==
=== Batters ===
==== Cycles ====
- Lou Clinton (BOS):
  - Clinton hit for his first cycle and 13th in franchise history, on July 13 against the Kansas City Athletics.

==== Other batting accomplishments ====
- Earl Averill Jr. (LAA):
  - Tied a Major League record by reaching base in 17 consecutive plate appearances between June 3 and 10, previously set by Piggy Ward in 1893.
- Bob Allison / Harmon Killebrew (MIN):
  - Became the first duo to hit two grand slams in the same inning, in the midst of an 11-run first inning against the Cleveland Indians on July 18.
- Warren Spahn (MIL):
  - Set a National League record for most career home runs by a pitcher by hitting his 35th home run on July 26 against the New York Mets.
- Mickey Mantle (NYY):
  - Became the seventh player in Major League history to hit 400 home runs in the fifth inning against the Detroit Tigers on September 10.

=== Pitchers ===
==== No-hitters ====
- Bo Belinsky (LAA):
  - Belinsky threw his first career no-hitter and first no-hitter in franchise history, by defeating the Baltimore Orioles 2–0 on May 5. Belinsky walked four, hitting two by pitch, and struck out nine.
- Earl Wilson (BOS):
  - Wilson threw his first career no-hitter and 12th no-hitter in franchise history, by defeating the Los Angeles Angels 2–0 on June 26. Wilson walked four and struck out five.
- Sandy Koufax (LAD):
  - Koufax threw his first career no-hitter and 14th no-hitter in franchise history, by defeating the New York Mets 5–0 on June 30. Koufax walked five and struck out 13, throwing 80 strikes on 138 pitches.
- Bill Monbouquette (BOS):
  - Monbouquette threw his first career no-hitter and 13th no-hitter in franchise history, by defeating the Chicago White Sox 1–0 on August 1. Monbouquette walked one and struck out seven.
- Jack Kralick (MIN):
  - Kralick threw his first career no-hitter and third no-hitter in franchise history, by defeating the Kansas City Athletics 1–0 on August 26. Kralick walked one and struck out three.

==== Other pitching accomplishments ====
- Sandy Koufax (LAD):
  - Became the third player to strike out 18 batters in a modern Major League game (including his previous record in 1959) for most strikeouts in a single game in a 10–2 win against the Chicago Cubs on April 24.
- Tom Cheney (WAS):
  - Set a Major League record (when including extra innings) for most strikeouts in a single game, throwing 21 strikeouts in a 16-inning 2–1 win against the Baltimore Orioles on September 12.

=== Miscellaneous ===
- New York Yankees:
  - Set a Major League record for most runs scored in the 22nd inning, by scoring two runs against the Detroit Tigers on September 1.
- New York Mets:
  - Set the modern Major League record for most losses in a season on September 30 with 120. The previous record of 117 was set by the Philadelphia Athletics in 1916.

== Awards and honors ==
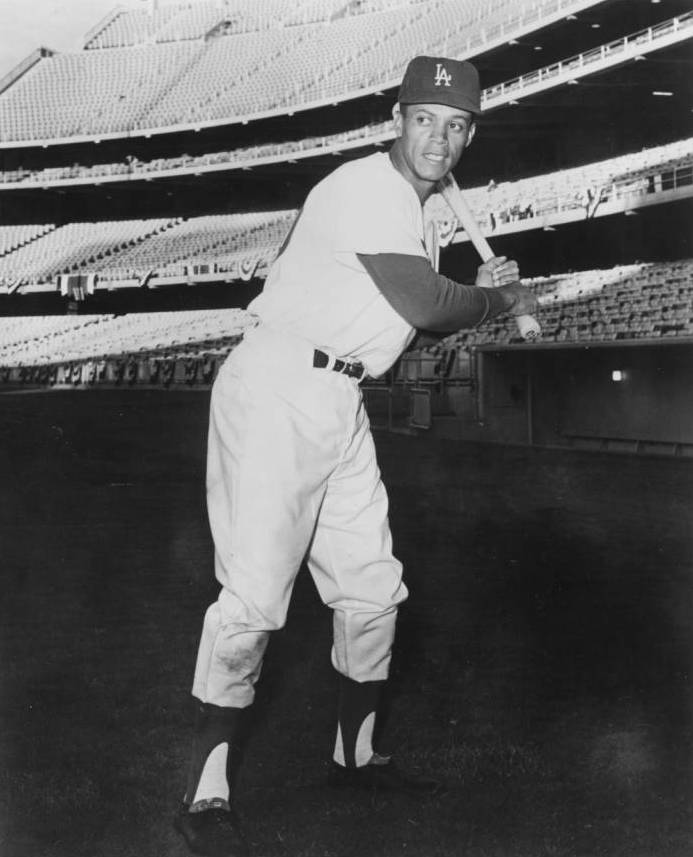
National League MVP Maury Wills

=== Regular season ===
Baseball Writers' Association of America Awards
BBWAA Award	National League	American League
Rookie of the Year	Ken Hubbs (CHC)	Tom Tresh (NYY)
Cy Young Award	Don Drysdale (LAD)	—
Most Valuable Player	Maury Wills (LAD)	Mickey Mantle (NYY)
Babe Ruth Award (World Series MVP)	—	Ralph Terry (NYY)
Gold Glove Awards
Position	National League	American League
Pitcher	Bobby Shantz (STL/HOU)	Jim Kaat (MIN)
Catcher	Del Crandall (MIL)	Earl Battey (MIN)
1st Base	Bill White (STL)	Vic Power (MIN)
2nd Base	Ken Hubbs (CHC)	Bobby Richardson (NYY)
3rd Base	Jim Davenport (SF)	Brooks Robinson (BAL)
Shortstop	Maury Wills (LAD)	Luis Aparicio (CWS)
Outfield	Bill Virdon (PIT)	Jim Landis (CWS)
Outfield	Roberto Clemente (PIT)	Al Kaline (DET)
Outfield	Willie Mays (SF)	Mickey Mantle (NYY)

=== Other awards ===
- Sport Magazine's World Series Most Valuable Player Award: Ralph Terry (NYY)

The Sporting News Awards
Award	National League	American League
Player of the Year	Don Drysdale (LAD); Maury Wills (LAD)	—
Pitcher of the Year	Don Drysdale (LAD)	Dick Donovan (CLE)
Fireman of the Year (Relief pitcher)	Roy Face (PIT)	Dick Radatz (BOS)
Rookie of the Year	Ken Hubbs (CHC)	Tom Tresh (NYY)
Manager of the Year	—	Bill Rigney (LAA)
Executive of the Year	—	Fred Haney (LAA)

=== Monthly awards ===
==== Player of the Month ====
Month	National League
May	Bob Purkey (CIN)
June	Sandy Koufax (LAD)
July	Frank Howard (LAD)
August	Jack Sanford (SF)

=== Baseball Hall of Fame ===
- Bob Feller
- Jackie Robinson
- Edd Roush
- Bill McKechnie (manager)

== Home field attendance ==
Team name	Wins	%±	Home attendance	%±	Per game
Los Angeles Dodgers	102	14.6%	2,755,184	52.7%	33,195
San Francisco Giants	103	21.2%	1,592,594	14.5%	19,422
New York Yankees	96	−11.9%	1,493,574	−14.5%	18,670
Minnesota Twins	91	30.0%	1,433,116	14.0%	17,477
Detroit Tigers	85	−15.8%	1,207,881	−24.5%	14,730
Los Angeles Angels	86	22.9%	1,144,063	89.6%	14,124
Chicago White Sox	85	−1.2%	1,131,562	−1.3%	13,970
Pittsburgh Pirates	93	24.0%	1,090,648	−9.0%	13,465
Cincinnati Reds	98	5.4%	982,095	−12.1%	12,125
St. Louis Cardinals	84	5.0%	953,895	11.5%	11,776
Houston Colt .45s	64		924,456		11,274
New York Mets	40		922,530		11,532
Baltimore Orioles	77	−18.9%	790,254	−16.9%	9,637
Milwaukee Braves	86	3.6%	766,921	−30.4%	9,468
Philadelphia Phillies	81	72.3%	762,034	29.1%	9,525
Boston Red Sox	76	0.0%	733,080	−13.8%	9,279
Washington Senators	60	−1.6%	729,775	22.2%	9,122
Cleveland Indians	80	2.6%	716,076	−1.3%	8,840
Kansas City Athletics	72	18.0%	635,675	−7.0%	7,848
Chicago Cubs	59	−7.8%	609,802	−9.4%	7,528

== Venues ==
The 1962 season saw two new teams in the National League, and with it, one new venue and one returning venue:

- The Houston Colt .45s played at Colt Stadium, where they would play for three seasons through 1964.
- The New York Mets played at the Polo Grounds, where they would play for two seasons through 1963. The Polo Grounds (in all its iterations) were previously occupied by the New York Giants from 1891 through 1957 before their relocation to San Francisco, California as the San Francisco Giants.

The 1962 season also saw three teams move into new venues:

- The Los Angeles Angels and Los Angeles Dodgers each moved into Dodger Stadium. The Angels, who previously played at Wrigley Field during their inaugural season the previous year, would play at Dodger Stadium for four seasons through 1965. The Dodgers, who previously played at Los Angeles Memorial Coliseum for four seasons, continue to play at Dodger Stadium to the present day.
- The Washington Senators open District of Columbia Stadium after playing at Griffith Stadium for their inaugural season the previous year. The team would play at District of Columbia Stadium for 10 seasons through 1971.

Comiskey Park, home of the Chicago White Sox, renamed to White Sox Park.

== Media ==
=== Television ===
CBS and NBC continued to air weekend Game of the Week broadcasts. CBS dropped its Sunday broadcasts once the NFL season started in mid-September, dropping the option clause for affiliates to carry baseball or football in place since 1957.

The All-Star Game, the National League tie-breaker series, and the World Series aired on NBC.

== Retired numbers ==
- Robin Roberts had his No. 36 retired by the Philadelphia Phillies on March 21. This was the first number retired by the team.

== See also ==
- 1962 in baseball (Events, Movies, Births, Deaths)
- 1962 Nippon Professional Baseball season
