= 1962 National League tie-breaker series =

Three-game tie-breaker series in Major League Baseball

Team (Wins)	Manager(s)	Season
San Francisco Giants (2)	Alvin Dark	101–61 (.623)
Los Angeles Dodgers (1)	Walter Alston	101–61 (.623)
- Dates: October 1–3, 1962
- Venue: Candlestick Park (San Francisco); Dodger Stadium (Los Angeles)
- Umpires: Al Barlick (Games 2–3), Augie Donatelli, Dusty Boggess, Jocko Conlan, Stan Landes (Game 1)
- Hall of Famers: Giants: Orlando Cepeda; Juan Marichal; Willie Mays; Willie McCovey; Gaylord Perry; Dodgers: Don Drysdale; Sandy Koufax; Duke Snider

The 1962 National League tie-breaker series was a best-of-three playoff series that extended Major League Baseball's (MLB) 1962 regular season to determine the winner of the National League (NL) pennant. The games were played from October 1 to 3, 1962, between the Los Angeles Dodgers and the San Francisco Giants. The Giants won the series, two games to one. The first game took place at Candlestick Park and the second and third were played at Dodger Stadium. The tie-breaker series was necessary after both teams finished the season with identical win–loss records of 101–61. The Dodgers won a coin flip late in the season, which gave them home field advantage. The series was broadcast nationally by NBC television, with Bob Wolff, George Kell (Game 2), and Joe Garagiola (Game 3) announcing, and NBC Radio, with Al Helfer and George Kell (Game 3) announcing.

The Giants won the first game in an 8–0 shutout by starting pitcher Billy Pierce over Sandy Koufax. The Dodgers evened the series with an 8–7 victory in Game 2, breaking their 35-inning scoreless streak in what was then the longest nine-inning game in MLB history. However, the Giants closed out the series in Game 3 with a 6–4 victory to clinch the NL pennant. This victory advanced the Giants to the 1962 World Series in which the defending champion New York Yankees defeated them in seven games. In baseball statistics, the tie-breaker series counted as the 163rd, 164th, and 165th regular season games for both teams, with all events in the series added to regular season statistics.

The 1962 series was the fourth tie-breaker playoff in the National League's 87 years of operation, with the previous ones having taken place in 1946, 1951 and 1959. Moreover, all four involved the Dodgers' franchise, which won one of those series (1959) and lost the other three. This was also the last MLB tie-breaker to use a best-of-three games format, as the NL subsequently adopted the single-game format used in the American League (AL).

== Background ==
The Dodgers and Giants finished the 1961 season second and third respectively in the NL, with records of 89–65 and 85–69. In an offseason trade with the Chicago White Sox the Giants acquired Billy Pierce and Don Larsen for Bob Farley, Eddie Fisher, Dom Zanni, and Verle Tiefenthaler. The Dodgers moved to a new home field, Dodger Stadium, for the 1962 season.

The Giants opened the 1962 season by establishing an early lead and, though they fell back by mid-April, held at least a share of that lead continuously from April 28 to June 7. At that point the Dodgers overtook the Giants, and for the next month the lead was traded between the two sides five times. The Giants held the lead for the last time on July 7. The Dodgers went 20–6 in July while the Giants went 16–11, allowing the Dodgers to take the league lead on July 8 and hold it until season's last regular game. The Los Angeles Times described the Dodgers' season as a "gamut of sublime" and "ridiculous", noting their successes—such as Maury Wills' 100 stolen bases breaking Ty Cobb's single-season record, Don Drysdale's 25 wins, and Sandy Koufax's no-hitter on June 30—together with problems such as the 18 unearned runs the defense had allowed for the season behind Drysdale, and other fielding issues.

The Dodgers lost 10 of their final 13 games from September 16 to 30, while the Giants lost just 6 over the same span. However, with seven games remaining the Dodgers were still ahead in the league by four games, and held a two-game lead with three left to play. They entered their final game with a one-game lead over the Giants, but fell 1–0 to the St. Louis Cardinals. Meanwhile, the Giants defeated the Houston Colt .45s 2–1 after an eighth-inning home run by Willie Mays. These results left the Dodgers and Giants tied in the league at 101–61, necessitating a tie-breaker to decide the NL pennant. The two teams had also played closely against one another during the regular season to this point, with each winning 9 of their 18 match-ups prior to the tie-breaker. Dodgers' manager Walt Alston and Giants' manager Alvin Dark could not agree on dates and sites for the tie-breaker, so they flipped a coin to decide home field advantage. Alston won the flip, opting to play the first game in San Francisco and the remaining two games in Los Angeles. The Dodgers had been more successful at home in the season, holding a 53–28 (.654 winning percentage) record there while going 47–34 (.580) on the road. Alston had also won the flip for the 1959 tie-breaker, which the Dodgers had gone on to win, and had chosen the same format.

== Game 1 summary ==
Sandy Koufax said he "had nothing at all" in describing his Game 1 performance.

Monday, October 1, 1962 1:06 pm (PT) at Candlestick Park in San Francisco, California
Team	1	2	3	4	5	6	7	8	9	R	H	E
Los Angeles	0	0	0	0	0	0	0	0	0	0	3	1
San Francisco	2	1	0	0	0	2	0	3	X	8	10	0
WP: Billy Pierce (16–6) LP: Sandy Koufax (14–7); Home runs: LAD: None; SF: Orlando Cepeda (35), Jim Davenport (14), Willie Mays 2 (49)

Sandy Koufax had missed two months of the season, not starting from July 17 until September 21. He started three games in his return prior to the tie-breaker, losing all three and pitching just seven-and-two-thirds innings across the three starts. The night before the first game of the tiebreaker, Walt Alston asked Koufax to start the game, as Don Drysdale and Johnny Podres, the Dodgers' two front line starting pitchers, had pitched the prior two days; Koufax agreed. In the game the Giants were the first to score, on a double by Felipe Alou in the bottom of the first inning, followed by a home run by Willie Mays to make the score 2–0. Billy Pierce quickly retired three Dodgers in order for the second consecutive inning and the Giants continued to hit in the bottom of the second inning. Jim Davenport led off the inning with a home run to make the score 3–0 and Ed Bailey followed with a single. Koufax was then relieved by Ed Roebuck, having allowed three runs in the game without recording an out in the second inning.

Roebuck recorded three straight outs to end the inning without further scoring. The Dodgers and the Giants each managed a single in their halves of the third inning. Neither Pierce nor Roebuck allowed a baserunner in the fourth or fifth innings, though the Giants further added to their lead in the sixth. The Dodgers pinch hit for Roebuck to lead off the top of the inning with Ken McMullen and although he singled he did not score. Larry Sherry entered to pitch for the Dodgers in the bottom of the inning and after recording the first out he allowed back-to-back home runs to Mays and Orlando Cepeda to give the Giants a 5–0 lead. Davenport then singled and Sherry was relieved by Jack Smith who finished the inning without further damage.

The game continued without scoring until the eighth inning. The Dodgers managed to get their second runner in scoring position as Doug Camilli pinch hit for Smith, but they did not score. Phil Ortega entered to pitch for the Dodgers in the bottom of the eighth and the Giants continued their offensive performance. Willie Mays walked to open the inning and then stole second base with one out. Davenport and Bailey both walked to load the bases and José Pagán doubled to empty the bases and make the game 8–0. Pierce remained in the game to pitch the ninth, finishing his complete game shutout. Koufax later said of his Game 1 performance, "I had nothing at all."

== Game 2 summary ==
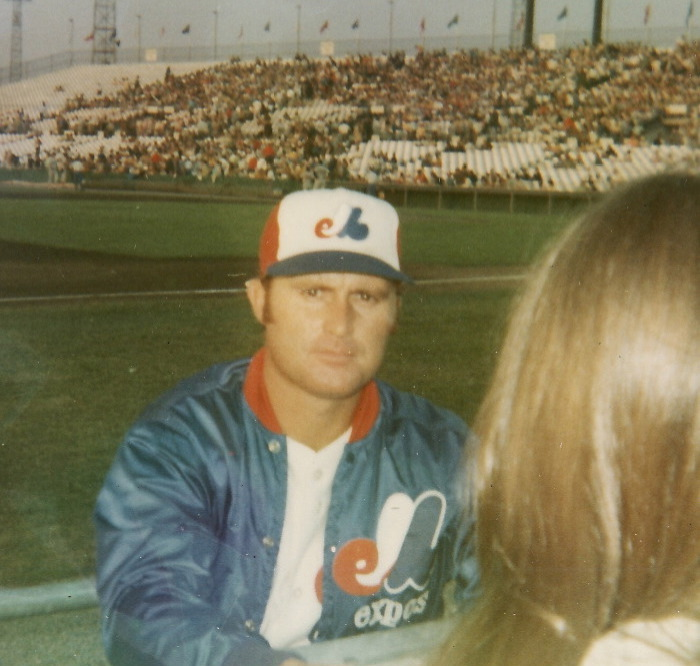
Ron Fairly, seen here with the Montreal Expos, hit the game-winning sacrifice fly for the Dodgers in Game 2 having entered as a defensive replacement in the seventh inning.

Tuesday, October 2, 1962 1:06 pm (PT) at Dodger Stadium in Los Angeles, California
Team	1	2	3	4	5	6	7	8	9	R	H	E
San Francisco	0	1	0	0	0	4	0	2	0	7	13	1
Los Angeles	0	0	0	0	0	7	0	0	1	8	7	2
WP: Stan Williams (14–12) LP: Bobby Bolin (7–3)

The Giants scored first for the second consecutive game, as Orlando Cepeda singled with one out in the second inning and scored on a double by Felipe Alou against Dodgers' starter Don Drysdale. The Giants then extended their lead in the top of the sixth inning. Alou struck out to open the inning but Tom Haller then walked and advanced to third base on a double by José Pagán. Giants' starter Jack Sanford then reached base on a throwing error by Drysdale, which also allowed Haller to score and advanced Pagán to third base. Chuck Hiller and Jim Davenport followed this with successive singles which scored Pagán and Sanford respectively. This made the score 4–0 in favor of the Giants with Hiller on second and Sanford on first, still with only one out in the inning. Ed Roebuck entered in relief of Drysdale, inducing an out at second base on a groundball by Willie Mays, to leave runners at the corners with two outs. Willie McCovey singled, allowing Hiller to score and make the game 5–0; Cepeda was then retired to end the inning.

Jack Sanford had allowed just four baserunners through his first five innings, only one of whom reached scoring position. However, after he walked Jim Gilliam to open the bottom of the sixth inning, Giants' manager Alvin Dark double switched to bring Stu Miller in to relieve Sanford, and replaced McCovey in left field with Matty Alou. After the game Dark explained his decision to remove his thus far successful pitcher: "Sanford was suffering from a cold and he was pooped." Duke Snider doubled, advancing Gilliam to third. Tommy Davis then hit a sacrifice fly, scoring Gilliam and advancing Snider. This run made the game 5–1 and ended what had been a 35 consecutive scoreless inning stretch by the Dodgers. The Dodgers increased their score as Wally Moon walked and Frank Howard singled, to bring Snider home and make the game 5–2. Billy O'Dell relieved Miller and Doug Camilli, who was pinch hitting for John Roseboro, singled to load the bases. Andy Carey then pinch hit for Willie Davis and was hit by a pitch to score Moon. The Dodgers continued substituting players, pinch hitting Lee Walls for Roebuck and bringing in Larry Burright to pinch run for Carey. Walls then hit a double which emptied the bases, giving the Dodgers a 6–5 lead in the game, and advanced to third base on the throw.

Walls' double continued his success as a pinch hitter, making him 13-for-26 with 12 runs batted in in such situations for the season. Don Larsen entered to relieve O'Dell, who had not recorded an out but had earned a blown save for his performance. Maury Wills hit a ground ball to the first baseman, who threw home in an attempt to put out Walls who slid hard into the Giants' catcher Haller. The slide, which cut Haller's arm deep enough to later require six stitches, caused him to drop the ball, leaving Walls safe on Haller's error and extending the Dodgers' lead to 7–5. John Orsino entered as the new catcher to replace the injured Haller. Wills then stole second, his 101st stolen base of the season, before the batter Gilliam saw a single pitch. Orsino's throw to try to catch Wills went past second base and into center field. Wills attempted to advance to third, but was thrown out by Willie Mays. Larsen then induced a flyball out by Gilliam and the inning was over. Between the two halves of the sixth the two teams had scored a combined 11 runs and used six pitchers, three pinch hitters, two defensive replacements, and a pinch runner.

Ron Perranoski entered as the new pitcher for the seventh, Camilli took his place as the new catcher, and Ron Fairly replaced Wally Moon at first base. Burright became the new second baseman, replacing Gilliam who moved to third base while the previous third baseman, Tommy Davis, moved to center field. Perranoski allowed singles to Orsino and Pagán after a ground out by Felipe Alou. The Giants pinch hit Harvey Kuenn for Matty Alou and Bob Nieman for Hiller, but both recorded outs to end the top of the seventh. Ernie Bowman replaced Nieman at second base for the Giants in the bottom of the inning and no runs scored in the frame. The Giants continued to hit Perranoski in the top of the eighth, with singles by Davenport and Mays to open the inning. Jack Smith entered in relief but allowed a single to Ed Bailey pinch hitting for Larsen which scored Davenport to cut the Dodgers' lead to 7–6. Mays attempted to advance to third on the play but was called out. The play drew arguments from Mays, Alvin Dark, and third base coach Whitey Lockman as third base umpire Jocko Conlan appeared to call Mays safe before changing it to out. Carl Boles pinch ran for Bailey, and Cepeda reached on an error on his fly ball which allowed Boles to move to third. Stan Williams relieved Smith and walked Felipe Alou to load the bases. Orsino hit a sacrifice fly to tie the game at seven runs apiece and Pagán grounded out to end the inning.

Bobby Bolin entered as the new pitcher for the Giants in the bottom of the eighth. Bolin kept the game tied, as did Williams who pitched a perfect top of the ninth inning. Wills walked to leadoff the bottom of the ninth, however, and Dick LeMay relieved Bolin. Gilliam then also walked, advancing Wills to second. The Dodgers announced Daryl Spencer as a pinch hitter for Snider and the Giants countered by bringing Gaylord Perry in relief of LeMay. Spencer laid down a successful sacrifice bunt, advancing the two runners to second and third base. The play drew comment after the game, as some writers believed Perry had a chance to throw to third base to put out the lead runner Wills. Alvin Dark had given Perry instructions to throw to third base if a bunt was made. He threw to first instead, allowing the sacrifice. Alvin Dark angrily went to the mound, and Mike McCormick relieved Perry, intentionally walked Tommy Davis, and then allowed a game-winning walk-off sacrifice fly to Fairly driving in Wills. Game 2 lasted 4 hours and 18 minutes, breaking the previous record of 4 hours and 2 minutes for the longest 9-inning game in major league history. Coincidentally Wills, who scored the winning run, celebrated his 30th birthday on the same day as Game 2.

== Game 3 summary ==
Don Larsen earned the win in Game 3 after relieving Juan Marichal in the eighth inning.

Wednesday, October 3, 1962 1:06 pm (PT) at Dodger Stadium in Los Angeles, California
Team	1	2	3	4	5	6	7	8	9	R	H	E
San Francisco	0	0	2	0	0	0	0	0	4	6	13	3
Los Angeles	0	0	0	1	0	2	1	0	0	4	8	4
WP: Don Larsen (5–4) LP: Ed Roebuck (10–2) Sv: Billy Pierce (1); Home runs: SF: None; LAD: Tommy Davis (27)

Game 3 matched the Giants' Juan Marichal against Johnny Podres, though Dodgers' manager Walt Alston had considered starting reliever Larry Sherry. The pair kept the game scoreless through two innings before the Giants opened the scoring in the top of the third. José Pagán singled to lead off the inning, Marichal reached on a throwing error by the pitcher on a throw to second base which allowed Pagán to move to third, and Pagán scored on a Harvey Kuenn single. Then, while Chuck Hiller was batting, John Roseboro made an error in attempting to pickoff Marichal on second base, allowing him to advance to third. Hiller hit a fly ball to shallow left field and Marichal held at third base. Left fielder Duke Snider threw home but the ball was cut off by the third baseman, who threw to second to try to catch Kuenn in a rundown between first and second. However, the second baseman's throw to first hit Kuenn in the back, leaving him safe at first and allowing Marichal to score, to make the game 2–0. Felipe Alou then singled, Kuenn went to third, and Alou advanced to second on the throw. Podres intentionally walked Willie Mays to load the bases with one out, and induced a double play from Orlando Cepeda to end the inning.

The Dodgers cut into the lead in the fourth, as Snider doubled to lead off, advanced to third on a Tommy Davis single, and scored on a groundout by Frank Howard. The Giants threatened against Podres in the top of the sixth with singles by Cepeda, Ed Bailey, and Jim Davenport on a bunt to load the bases. However, Ed Roebuck relieved Podres and escaped the inning without allowing a run. The Dodgers took a 3–2 lead in the bottom of the inning as Snider singled and scored on a home run by Tommy Davis. They extended this lead in the bottom of the seventh as Wills singled and then stole second as Jim Gilliam batted. Manager Alvin Dark had chosen not to try to hold Wills to the first base bag as Dark did not believe his Giants' defense could stop Wills from stealing regardless of their positioning. Gilliam was put out for the second out of the inning, but Wills stole third base and then scored on a throwing error by the catcher trying to catch him. This extended the Dodgers' lead to 4–2. The Dodgers further threatened in the bottom of the eighth. Don Larsen entered in relief of Marichal midway through Davis' at bat but Davis walked to lead off the inning regardless. Ron Fairly sacrificed him to second base and Davis then stole third as Howard struck out. However, Larsen intentionally walked both Roseboro and Willie Davis to load the bases and induced a ground out by Roebuck to end the inning.

The Giants took the decisive lead in the top of the ninth inning. Matty Alou pinch hit for Larsen and singled to lead off the inning and Kuenn grounded into a force out at second base. Willie McCovey pinch hit for Hiller and walked to advance Kuenn. Ernie Bowman pinch ran for McCovey and Felipe Alou walked to load the bases. Mays hit a line drive single scoring Kuenn. Roebuck barely managed to knock the ball down to hold Mays to a single and Mays said he was "still mad" after the game because he had expected more from the hit. Stan Williams relieved Roebuck and Cepeda hit a sacrifice fly to tie the game at 4 and advance Alou to third. Mays moved to second on a wild pitch to Bailey and Williams intentionally walked him to reload the bases. Williams walked Davenport to give the Giants a 5–4 lead, and they added to it as Pagán reached on an error by second baseman Larry Burright allowing Mays to score and extend the lead to 6–4. Billy Pierce pitched a perfect bottom of the ninth to end the game, earning his only save of the season. Had the Dodgers not yielded the lead in the final inning they instead would have earned a postseason berth, their first since winning the pennant via a tie-breaker in 1959.

== Aftermath ==
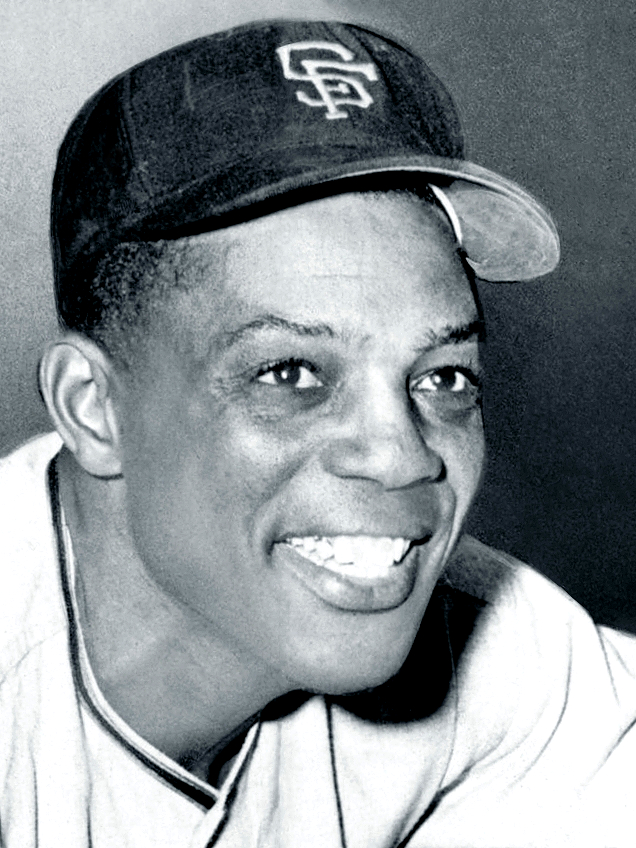
Willie Mays led the league in home runs in 1962 and finished second in MVP voting.

The Giants' win earned the franchise its 17th playoff berth, the first since moving to San Francisco from New York City in 1958. They faced the New York Yankees in the 1962 World Series, which they lost in seven games. They returned to the playoffs in 1971 and the World Series in 1989 and 2002. In 2010, the Giants won their first World Series since moving to San Francisco. The Dodgers returned to the World Series in 1963 and swept the Yankees. The Dodgers set a new attendance record in 1962, topping the previous mark of 2,641,845 set by the Cleveland Indians in 1948 with a total of 2,755,184 fans. Game 2 was the longest nine-inning game in MLB history with a time of 4 hours and 18 minutes, a record which stood until April 30, 1996, when a game between the Yankees and the Baltimore Orioles lasted 4 hours and 21 minutes. The record was again broken on August 18, 2006, during a game in which the Yankees beat the Boston Red Sox 14–11 in 4 hours and 45 minutes.

In baseball statistics tie-breakers counted as regular season games, with all events in them added to regular season statistics. For example, Willie Mays extended his league-leading home run total to 49 and Maury Wills raised his record-breaking stolen base total from 100 to 104, the most since 1900. Additionally Wills, José Pagán, and Tommy Davis played in 163, 164, and 165 games respectively, totals which could not have been matched by players not on the Dodgers or Giants. Wills also won the NL Most Valuable Player Award narrowly over Mays, with Davis placing third in the voting. Don Drysdale won both the Cy Young and Sporting News Pitcher of the Year awards and Jim Davenport, Wills, and Mays each won Rawlings Gold Glove Awards. MLB played two All-Star Games in 1962. Four Dodgers and five Giants were named to the first while four Dodgers and four Giants played in the second. Five future Hall of Famers were on the Giants roster in 1962 (Cepeda, Marichal, Mays, McCovey, and Perry) while the Dodgers had three (Drysdale, Koufax, and Snider). Dodgers' manager Walt Alston was also inducted to the Hall as a manager in 1983. Additionally, this 1962 series was the last MLB tie-breaker to use the best-of-three games format. The AL had always used a one-game format and all future NL tie-breakers were played in that format as well.

== See also ==
- Dodgers-Giants rivalry
- List of Major League Baseball tie-breakers
