= 1962 San Francisco Giants season =

1962 San Francisco Giants
- National League champions
- League: National League
- Ballpark: Candlestick Park
- City: San Francisco
- Record: 103–62 (.624)
- League place: 1st
- Owners: Horace Stoneham
- General managers: Chub Feeney
- Managers: Alvin Dark
- Television: KTVU (Russ Hodges, Lon Simmons)
- Radio: KSFO (Russ Hodges, Lon Simmons, Bill King)

The 1962 San Francisco Giants season was the Giants' 80th year in Major League Baseball, their fifth year in San Francisco since their move from New York following the 1957 season, and their third at Candlestick Park. The team finished in first place in the National League with a record of 103 wins and 62 losses. They finished the season tied with their arch-rivals, the Los Angeles Dodgers, for first place in the league, necessitating a three-game tiebreaker playoff to determine the pennant winner. The Giants won two of the three games to take their first National League title since moving to San Francisco, making the Giants the first NL champions of the 162-game schedule era. They went on to the 1962 World Series, where they lost in seven games to the New York Yankees. The Giants had 1,552 hits in the regular season, the most in the club's San Francisco era.

== Offseason ==
- October 10, 1961: 1961 Major League Baseball expansion draft
  - Joey Amalfitano was drafted from the Giants by the Houston Colt .45s.
  - Hobie Landrith was drafted from the Giants by the New York Mets.
- October 16, 1961: Billy Loes was purchased from the Giants by the New York Mets.
- November 27, 1961: Georges Maranda was drafted from the Giants by the Minnesota Twins in the 1961 rule 5 draft.
- November 30, 1961: Eddie Fisher, Dom Zanni, Bob Farley and a player to be named later were traded by the Giants to the Chicago White Sox for Don Larsen and Billy Pierce. The Giants completed the deal by sending Verle Tiefenthaler to the White Sox on August 17, 1962.
- March 2, 1962: Billy Loes was returned to the Giants by the New York Mets.
- March 2, 1962: Billy Loes was released by the Giants.

== Regular season ==
=== Season standings ===
National League
Team	W	L	Pct.	GB	Home	Road
San Francisco Giants	103	62	.624	—	61‍–‍21	42‍–‍41
Los Angeles Dodgers	102	63	.618	1	54‍–‍29	48‍–‍34
Cincinnati Reds	98	64	.605	3½	58‍–‍23	40‍–‍41
Pittsburgh Pirates	93	68	.578	8	51‍–‍30	42‍–‍38
Milwaukee Braves	86	76	.531	15½	49‍–‍32	37‍–‍44
St. Louis Cardinals	84	78	.519	17½	44‍–‍37	40‍–‍41
Philadelphia Phillies	81	80	.503	20	46‍–‍34	35‍–‍46
Houston Colt .45s	64	96	.400	36½	32‍–‍48	32‍–‍48
Chicago Cubs	59	103	.364	42½	32‍–‍49	27‍–‍54
New York Mets	40	120	.250	60½	22‍–‍58	18‍–‍62

=== Record vs. opponents ===
1962 National League record Sources:
Team	CHC	CIN	HOU	LAD	MIL	NYM	PHI	PIT	SF	STL
Chicago	—	4–14	7–11	4–14	8–10	9–9	10–8	4–14	6–12	7–11
Cincinnati	14–4	—	13–5	9–9	13–5	13–5	8–10	13–5	7–11	8–10
Houston	11–7	5–13	—	6–12	7–11	13–3–1	1–17	5–13	7–11	9–9–1
Los Angeles	14–4	9–9	12–6	—	10–8	16–2	14–4	10–8	10–11	7–11
Milwaukee	10–8	5–13	11–7	8–10	—	12–6	11–7	10–8	7–11	12–6
New York	9–9	5–13	3–13–1	2–16	6–12	—	4–14	2–16	4–14	5–13
Philadelphia	8–10	10–8	17–1	4–14	7–11	14–4	—	7–10	5–13	9–9
Pittsburgh	14–4	5–13	13–5	8–10	8–10	16–2	10–7	—	7–11	12–6
San Francisco	12–6	11–7	11–7	11–10	11–7	14–4	13–5	11–7	—	9–9
St. Louis	11–7	10–8	9–9–1	11–7	6–12	13–5	9–9	6–12	9–9	—

=== Opening Day starters ===
- Felipe Alou
- Ed Bailey
- Orlando Cepeda
- Jim Davenport
- Chuck Hiller
- Harvey Kuenn
- Juan Marichal
- Willie Mays
- José Pagán

=== Notable transactions ===
- April 29, 1962: Bob Nieman was purchased by the Giants from the Cleveland Indians.

== Game log and schedule ==
Legend
	Giants win
	Giants loss
	Postponement
**Bold**	Giants team member

1962 Game Log (102–63) (Home: 61–21; Road: 42–41)
April (15–5) (Home: 11–2; Road: 4–3)

#	Date	Opponent	Score	Win	Loss	Save	Stadium	Attendance	Record	Report
1	April 10	Braves	6–0	**Marichal** (1–0)			**Candlestick Park**	39,177	1–0	W1
2	April 11	Braves	3–1	**O'Dell** (1–0)			**Candlestick Park**	16,721	2–0	W2
3	April 12	Braves	8–4	**Sanford** (1–0)		**Miller** (1)	**Candlestick Park**	9,177	3–0	W3
4	April 13	Reds	7–2	**Pierce** (1–0)		**Miller** (2)	**Candlestick Park**	23,775	4–0	W4
5	April 14	Reds	13–6	**Larsen** (1–0)			**Candlestick Park**	18,086	5–0	W5
6	April 15	Reds	3–4	**Marichal** (1–1)			**Candlestick Park**	28,697	5–1	L1
7	April 16	Dodgers	19–8	**O'Dell** (2–0)			**Candlestick Park**	32,819	6–1	W1
8	April 17	Dodgers	7–8		**McCormick** (0–1)		**Candlestick Park**	25,841	6–2	L1
9	April 18	@ Braves	4–6		**Miller** (0–1)		County Stadium	30,001	6–3	L2
10	April 19	@ Braves	7–6	**Marichal** (2–1)			County Stadium	4,570	7–3	W1
11	April 21	@ Reds	8–6	**Larsen** (2–0)		**LeMay** (1)	Crosley Field	6,006	8–3	W2
12	April 22	@ Reds	4–6		**Sanford** (1–1)		Crosley Field	6,583	8–4	L1
13	April 23	@ Reds	4–1	**Pierce** (2–0)			Crosley Field	6,483	9–4	W1
14	April 24	@ Pirates	3–7		**Marichal** (2–2)		Forbes Field	18,620	9–5	L1
15	April 25	@ Pirates	8–3	**Perry** (1–0)		**Larsen** (1)	Forbes Field	21,652	10–5	W1
16	April 27	Cubs	5–4	**Miller** (1–1)			**Candlestick Park**	8,710	11–5	W2
17	April 28	Cubs	11–2	**Marichal** (3–2)			**Candlestick Park**	14,427	12–5	W3
18	April 29	Cubs	7–0	**Sanford** (2–1)			**Candlestick Park**	n/a	13–5	W4
19	April 29	Cubs	6–0	**Pierce** (3–0)			**Candlestick Park**	40,973	14–5	W5
20	April 30	Pirates	4–1	**Perry** (2–0)			**Candlestick Park**	9,543	15–5	W6

May (20–10) (Home: 12–4; Road: 8–6)

#	Date	Opponent	Score	Win	Loss	Save	Stadium	Attendance	Record	Report
21	May 1	Pirates	4–2	**O'Dell** (3–0)			**Candlestick Park**	23,657	16–5	W7
22	May 2	Pirates	3–2	**Marichal** (4–2)			**Candlestick Park**	9,926	17–5	W8
23	May 3	Pirates	8–4	**Sanford** (3–1)			**Candlestick Park**	10,723	18–5	W9
24	May 4	@ Cubs	11–6	**Pierce** (4–0)		**Larsen** (2)	Wrigley Field	5,011	19–5	W10
25	May 5	@ Cubs	8–12		**Duffalo** (0–1)		Wrigley Field	11,362	19–6	L1
26	May 6	@ Cubs	7–3	**O'Dell** (4–0)			Wrigley Field	14,090	20–6	W1
27	May 8	@ Cardinals	4–3	**Marichal** (5–2)			Busch Stadium	14,618	21–6	W2
28	May 9	@ Cardinals	3–7		**Sanford** (3–2)		Busch Stadium	12,421	21–7	L1
29	May 10	@ Cardinals	6–0	**O'Dell** (5–0)			Busch Stadium	15,567	22–7	W1
30	May 11	@ Colt .45s	0–7		**Perry** (2–1)		Colt Stadium	19,003	22–8	L1
31	May 12	@ Colt .45s	11–0	**Marichal** (6–2)			Colt Stadium	26,311	23–8	W1
32	May 13	@ Colt .45s	7–2	**Sanford** (4–2)			Colt Stadium	19,879	24–8	W2
33	May 15	Cardinals	6–3	**Pierce** (5–0)		**Miller** (3)	**Candlestick Park**	30,484	25–8	W3
34	May 16	Cardinals	7–2	**Marichal** (7–2)			**Candlestick Park**	12,925	26–8	W4
35	May 17	Cardinals	0–1		**O'Dell** (5–1)		**Candlestick Park**	10,976	26–9	L1
36	May 18	Colt .45s	2–3 (10)		**Sanford** (4–3)		**Candlestick Park**	18,544	26–10	L2
37	May 19	Colt .45s	10–2	**McCormick** (1–1)		**Larsen** (3)	**Candlestick Park**	16,701	27–10	W1
38	May 20	Colt .45s	5–6		**Marichal** (7–3)		**Candlestick Park**	n/a	27–11	L1
39	May 20	Colt .45s	7–4	**Pierce** (6–0)			**Candlestick Park**	40,932	28–11	W1
40	May 21	@ Dodgers	1–8		**O'Dell** (5–2)		Dodger Stadium	45,192	28–12	L1
41	May 22	@ Dodgers	1–5		**Sanford** (4–4)		Dodger Stadium	46,636	28–13	L2
42	May 23	Phillies	7–10		**McCormick** (1–2)		**Candlestick Park**	7,314	28–14	L3
43	May 24	Phillies	7–4	**Miller** (2–1)			**Candlestick Park**	5,680	29–14	W1
44	May 25	Phillies	10–7	**Pierce** (7–0)		**Miller** (4)	**Candlestick Park**	11,538	30–14	W2
45	May 26	Mets	7–6 (10)	**Larsen** (3–0)			**Candlestick Park**	18,791	31–14	W3
46	May 27	Mets	7–1	**Sanford** (5–4)		**Miller** (5)	**Candlestick Park**	n/a	32–14	W4
47	May 27	Mets	6–5	**Duffalo** (1–1)		**Miller** (6)	**Candlestick Park**	39,551	33–14	W5
48	May 30	@ Phillies	4–3 (12)	**Miller** (3–1)			Connie Mack Stadium	n/a	34–14	W6
49	May 30	@ Phillies	5–2	**McCormick** (2–2)		**Miller** (7)	Connie Mack Stadium	29,739	35–14	W7
50	May 31	@ Phillies	1–2		**O'Dell** (5–3)		Connie Mack Stadium	9,393	35–15	L1

June (16–13) (Home: 9–5; Road: 7–8)

#	Date	Opponent	Score	Win	Loss	Save	Stadium	Attendance	Record	Report
51	June 1	@ Mets	9–6	**Pierce** (8–0)		**Miller** (8)	Polo Grounds	43,742	36–15	W1
52	June 2	@ Mets	10–1	**Sanford** (6–4)			Polo Grounds	n/a	37–15	W2
53	June 2	@ Mets	6–4	**O'Dell** (6–3)		**Miller** (9)	Polo Grounds	41,001	38–15	W3
54	June 3	@ Mets	6–1	**Marichal** (8–3)			Polo Grounds	34,102	39–15	W4
55	June 5	@ Cubs	11–6	**O'Dell** (7–3)			Wrigley Field	6,087	40–15	W5
56	June 6	@ Cubs	3–4		**Larsen** (3–1)		Wrigley Field	3,783	40–16	L1
57	June 7	@ Cubs	3–4		**Pierce** (8–1)		Wrigley Field	6,656	40–17	L2
58	June 8	@ Cardinals	4–8		**Marichal** (8–4)		Busch Stadium	16,209	40–18	L3
59	June 9	@ Cardinals	4–8		**Sanford** (6–5)		Busch Stadium	17,368	40–19	L4
60	June 10	@ Cardinals	5–6		**O'Dell** (7–4)		Busch Stadium	n/a	40–20	L5
61	June 10	@ Cardinals	3–13		**Duffalo** (1–2)		Busch Stadium	33,679	40–21	L6
62	June 12	@ Reds	2–1	**Marichal** (9–4)			Crosley Field	n/a	41–21	W1
63	June 12	@ Reds	7–5	**McCormick** (3–2)		**Larsen** (4)	Crosley Field	18,215	42–21	W2
64	June 13	@ Reds	0–5		**Sanford** (6–6)		Crosley Field	15,837	42–22	L1
65	June 14	@ Reds	0–8		**Pierce** (8–2)		Crosley Field	16,756	42–23	L2
66	June 15	Cardinals	2–5		**O'Dell** (7–5)		**Candlestick Park**	23,427	42–24	L3
67	June 16	Cardinals	5–0	**Marichal** (10–4)			**Candlestick Park**	24,844	43–24	W1
68	June 17	Cardinals	6–3	**Sanford** (7–6)			**Candlestick Park**	40,533	44–24	W2
69	June 19	Colt .45s	4–6		**O'Dell** (7–6)		**Candlestick Park**	18,749	44–25	L1
70	June 20	Colt .45s	5–9		**Miller** (3–2)		**Candlestick Park**	10,430	44–26	L2
71	June 22	Braves	9–11		**Miller** (3–3)		**Candlestick Park**	20,513	44–27	L3
72	June 23	Braves	4–2	**McCormick** (4–2)			**Candlestick Park**	17,345	45–27	W1
73	June 24	Braves	3–1	**Marichal** (11–4)			**Candlestick Park**	26,130	46–27	W2
74	June 25	Reds	3–1	**O'Dell** (8–6)			**Candlestick Park**	9,195	47–27	W3
75	June 26	Reds	6–5 (10)	**Miller** (4–3)			**Candlestick Park**	15,967	48–27	W4
76	June 27	Reds	6–3	**Bolin** (1–0)			**Candlestick Park**	12,537	49–27	W5
77	June 28	Phillies	2–7		**Marichal** (11–5)		**Candlestick Park**	7,174	49–28	L1
78	June 29	Phillies	4–3 (12)	**O'Dell** (9–6)			**Candlestick Park**	11,088	50–28	W1
79	June 30	Phillies	8–3	**Bolin** (2–0)		**Miller** (10)	**Candlestick Park**	11,716	51–28	W2

July (16–11) (Home: 6–3; Road: 10–8)

#	Date	Opponent	Score	Win	Loss	Save	Stadium	Attendance	Record	Report
80	July 1	Phillies	5–4	**Larsen** (4–1)		**Miller** (11)	**Candlestick Park**	17,612	52–28	W3
81	July 2	Mets	5–8		**Miller** (4–4)		**Candlestick Park**	11,058	52–29	L1
82	July 3	Mets	10–1	**Sanford** (8–6)			**Candlestick Park**	7,083	53–29	W1
83	July 4	Mets	11–4	**Bolin** (3–0)			**Candlestick Park**	n/a	54–29	W2
84	July 4	Mets	10–3	**O'Dell** (10–6)			**Candlestick Park**	33,253	55–29	W3
85	July 5	Dodgers	3–11		**McCormick** (4–3)		**Candlestick Park**	24,915	55–30	L1
86	July 6	Dodgers	12–3	**Marichal** (12–5)			**Candlestick Park**	41,569	56–30	W1
87	July 7	Dodgers	10–3	**Sanford** (9–6)		**Miller** (12)	**Candlestick Park**	40,186	57–30	W2
88	July 8	Dodgers	0–2		**O'Dell** (10–7)		**Candlestick Park**	41,717	57–31	L1
89	July 12	@ Phillies	5–3	**Sanford** (10–6)		**Miller** (13)	Connie Mack Stadium	17,151	58–31	W1
90	July 13	@ Phillies	2–3		**O'Dell** (10–8)		Connie Mack Stadium	18,693	58–32	L1
91	July 14	@ Phillies	5–6 (10)		**Miller** (4–5)		Connie Mack Stadium	7,716	58–33	L2
92	July 15	@ Mets	3–5		**Pierce** (8–3)		Polo Grounds	n/a	58–34	L3
93	July 15	@ Mets	9–8	**Bolin** (4–0)		**Marichal** (1)	Polo Grounds	35,463	59–34	W1
94	July 16	@ Mets	3–2	**Sanford** (11–6)			Polo Grounds	23,280	60–34	W2
95	July 17	@ Braves	4–3	**O'Dell** (11–8)		**Bolin** (1)	County Stadium	14,584	61–34	W3
96	July 18	@ Braves	0–6		**Marichal** (12–6)		County Stadium	15,324	61–35	L1
97	July 19	@ Braves	7–3	**Bolin** (5–0)			County Stadium	14,158	62–35	W1
98	July 20	@ Pirates	6–3	**Sanford** (12–6)		**Larsen** (5)	Forbes Field	37,705	63–35	W2
99	July 21	@ Pirates	6–7 (11)		**Larsen** (4–2)		Forbes Field	23,917	63–36	L1
100	July 22	@ Pirates	5–4	**Marichal** (13–6)			Forbes Field	27,973	64–36	W1
101	July 23	@ Colt .45s	5–1	**Bolin** (6–0)			Colt Stadium	12,096	65–36	W2
102	July 24	@ Colt .45s	3–1	**Sanford** (13–6)		**Larsen** (6)	Colt Stadium	11,289	66–36	W3
103	July 25	@ Colt .45s	3–2	**O'Dell** (12–8)		**Miller** (14)	Colt Stadium	12,344	67–36	W4
104	July 27	@ Dodgers	1–3		**Marichal** (13–7)		Dodger Stadium	54,095	67–37	L1
105	July 28	@ Dodgers	6–8		**Bolin** (6–1)		Dodger Stadium	49,228	67–38	L2
106	July 29	@ Dodgers	1–11		**O'Dell** (12–9)		Dodger Stadium	53,792	67–39	L3

August (18–10) (Home: 12–4; Road: 6–6)

#	Date	Opponent	Score	Win	Loss	Save	Stadium	Attendance	Record	Report
107	August 1	Cubs	2–3 (10)		**O'Dell** (12–10)		**Candlestick Park**	8,930	67–40	L4
108	August 2	Cubs	4–3	**Pierce** (9–3)		**Larsen** (7)	**Candlestick Park**	7,454	68–40	W1
109	August 3	Pirates	2–5		**Marichal** (13–8)		**Candlestick Park**	15,910	68–41	L1
110	August 4	Pirates	6–5	**Sanford** (14–6)		**Bolin** (2)	**Candlestick Park**	29,370	69–41	W1
111	August 5	Pirates	2–1	**O'Dell** (13–10)			**Candlestick Park**	25,532	70–41	W2
112	August 6	Phillies	9–2	**Pierce** (10–3)			**Candlestick Park**	6,222	71–41	W3
113	August 7	Phillies	4–2	**Marichal** (14–8)			**Candlestick Park**	8,531	72–41	W4
114	August 8	Mets	2–5		**Bolin** (6–2)		**Candlestick Park**	11,411	72–42	L1
115	August 9	Mets	7–1	**Sanford** (15–6)			**Candlestick Park**	9,988	73–42	W1
116	August 10	Dodgers	11–2	**O'Dell** (14–10)			**Candlestick Park**	40,304	74–42	W2
117	August 11	Dodgers	5–4	**Pierce** (11–3)		**Miller** (15)	**Candlestick Park**	41,268	75–42	W3
118	August 12	Dodgers	5–1	**Marichal** (15–8)			**Candlestick Park**	41,812	76–42	W4
119	August 14	@ Cubs	9–2	**Sanford** (16–6)			Wrigley Field	13,609	77–42	W5
120	August 15	@ Cubs	5–7		**Miller** (4–5)		Wrigley Field	13,131	77–43	L1
121	August 16	@ Cubs	0–6		**Pierce** (11–4)		Wrigley Field	11,870	77–44	L2
122	August 17	@ Braves	4–6		**Marichal** (15–9)		County Stadium	20,781	77–45	L3
123	August 18	@ Braves	6–4	**Sanford** (17–6)		**Bolin** (3)	County Stadium	20,162	78–45	W1
124	August 19	@ Braves	8–13		**O'Dell** (14–11)		County Stadium	20,005	78–46	L1
125	August 20	@ Braves	4–9		**Larsen** (4–3)		County Stadium	15,906	78–47	L2
126	August 22	@ Mets	4–5		**Larsen** (4–4)		Polo Grounds	33,569	78–48	L3
127	August 23	@ Mets	2–1 (10)	**Marichal** (16–9)			Polo Grounds	18,815	79–48	W1
128	August 24	@ Phillies	6–0	**O'Dell** (15–11)			Connie Mack Stadium	19,454	80–48	W2
129	August 25	@ Phillies	6–1	**Pierce** (12–4)			Connie Mack Stadium	16,738	81–48	W3
130	August 26	@ Phillies	7–4	**Sanford** (18–6)		**Bolin** (4)	Connie Mack Stadium	14,855	82–48	W4
131	August 28	Braves	4–3	**Marichal** (17–9)			**Candlestick Park**	24,027	83–48	W5
132	August 29	Braves	3–10		**O'Dell** (15–12)		**Candlestick Park**	14,399	83–49	L1
133	August 30	Braves	3–2	**Sanford** (19–6)		**Larsen** (8)	**Candlestick Park**	12,496	84–49	W1
134	August 31	Reds	10–2	**Pierce** (13–4)			**Candlestick Park**	26,547	85–49	W2

September (16–12) (Home: 10–3; Road: 6–9)

#	Date	Opponent	Score	Win	Loss	Save	Stadium	Attendance	Record	Report
135	September 1	Reds	5–10		**Marichal** (17–10)		**Candlestick Park**	26,498	85–50	L1
136	September 2	Reds	6–4	**O'Dell** (16–12)			**Candlestick Park**	34,312	86–50	W1
137	September 3	@ Dodgers	7–3	**Sanford** (20–6)			Dodger Stadium	54,418	87–50	W2
138	September 4	@ Dodgers	4–5		**Pierce** (13–5)		Dodger Stadium	51,567	87-51	L1
139	September 5	@ Dodgers	3–0	**Marichal** (18–10)		**Bolin** (5)	Dodger Stadium	54,395	88-51	W1
140	September 6	@ Dodgers	9–6	**Bolin** (7–2)		**Miller** (16)	Dodger Stadium	54,263	89–51	W2
141	September 7	Cubs	6–5	**Sanford** (21–6)		**Miller** (17)	**Candlestick Park**	14,652	90–51	W3
142	September 8	Cubs	7–2	**Pierce** (14–5)		**Bolin** (6)	**Candlestick Park**	17,643	91–51	W4
143	September 9	Cubs	5–4	**McCormick** (5–3)		**Larsen** (9)	**Candlestick Park**	26,049	92–51	W5
144	September 10	Pirates	4–1	**O'Dell** (17–12)			**Candlestick Park**	19,498	93–51	W6
145	September 11	Pirates	2–0	**Sanford** (22–6)			**Candlestick Park**	10,283	94–51	W7
146	September 12	@ Reds	1–4		**Pierce** (14–6)		Crosley Field	17,564	94–52	L1
147	September 13	@ Reds	2–7		**McCormick** (5–4)		Crosley Field	16,421	94–53	L2
148	September 14	@ Pirates	1–5		**O'Dell** (17–13)		Forbes Field	14,354	94–54	L3
149	September 15	@ Pirates	1–5		**Sanford** (22–7)		Forbes Field	10,340	94–55	L4
150	September 16	@ Pirates	4–6 (10)		**Miller** (4–6)		Forbes Field	14,216	94–56	L5
151	September 17	@ Pirates	2–5		**McCormick** (5–5)		Forbes Field	8,364	94–57	L6
152	September 19	@ Cardinals	7–4	**O'Dell** (18–13)			Busch Stadium	8,314	95–57	W1
153	September 20	@ Cardinals	4–5		**LeMay** (0–1)		Busch Stadium	6,497	95–58	L1
154	September 21	@ Colt .45s	11–5	**Perry** (3–1)		**Miller** (18)	Colt Stadium	12,180	96–58	W1
155	September 22	@ Colt .45s	5–6		**Miller** (4–7)		Colt Stadium	17,125	96–59	L1
156	September 23	@ Colt .45s	10–3	**O'Dell** (19–13)			Colt Stadium	9,623	97–59	W1
157	September 25	Cardinals	4–2	**Sanford** (23–7)			**Candlestick Park**	10,965	98–59	W2
158	September 26	Cardinals	6–3	**Pierce** (15–6)		**Larsen** (10)	**Candlestick Park**	6,247	99–59	W3
159	September 27	Cardinals	4–7		**O'Dell** (19–14)		**Candlestick Park**	6,812	99–60	L1
160	September 29	Colt .45s	11–5	**Sanford** (24–7)		**Miller** (19)	**Candlestick Park**	n/a	100–60	W1
161	September 29	Colt .45s	2–4		**Marichal** (18–11)		**Candlestick Park**	26,268	101–60	L1
162	September 30	Colt .45s	2–1	**Miller** (5–7)			**Candlestick Park**	41,327	101–61	W1

October (2–1) (Home: 1–0; Road: 1–1)

#	Date	Opponent	Score	Win	Loss	Save	Stadium	Attendance	Record	Report
163	October 1	Dodgers	8–0	**Pierce** (16–6)	Koufax (14–7)		**Candlestick Park**	32,652	102–61	W2
164	October 2	@ Dodgers	7–8	Williams (14–12)	**Bolin** (7–3)		Dodger Stadium	25,321	102–62	L1
165	October 3	@ Dodgers	6–4	**Larsen** (5–4)	Roebuck (10–2)	**Pierce** (1)	Dodger Stadium	45,693	103–62	W1

=== Postseason ===
1962 Postseason Game Log
World Series (3–4)

Game	Date	Opponent	Score	Win	Loss	Save	Stadium	Attendance	Series	Report
1 WS	October 4	Yankees	2–6	Ford (1–0)	**O'Dell** (0–1)		**Candlestick Park**	43,852	0–1	L1
2 WS	October 5	Yankees	2–0	**Sanford** (1–0)	Terry (0–1)		**Candlestick Park**	43,910	1–1	W1
3 WS	October 7	@ Yankees	2–3	Stafford (1–0)	**Pierce** (0–1)		Yankee Stadium	71,434	1–2	L1
4 WS	October 8	@ Yankees	7–3	**Larsen** (1–0)	Coates (0–1)	**O'Dell** (1)	Yankee Stadium	66,607	2–2	W1
5 WS	October 10	@ Yankees	3–5	Terry (1–1)	**Sanford** (1–1)		Yankee Stadium	63,165	2–3	L1
6 WS	October 15	Yankees	5–2	**Pierce** (1–1)	Ford (1–1)		**Candlestick Park**	43,948	3–3	W1
7 WS	October 16	Yankees	0–1	Terry (2–1)	**Sanford** (1–2)		**Candlestick Park**	43,948	3–4	L1

=== Roster ===
1962 San Francisco Giants
**Roster**
**Pitchers**: 42 Bobby Bolin; 45 Jim Duffalo; 28 Bob Garibaldi; 18 Don Larsen; 39 Dick LeMay; 27 Juan Marichal; 40 Mike McCormick; 37 Stu Miller; 31 Billy O'Dell; 22,28 Gaylord Perry; 19 Billy Pierce; 33 Jack Sanford	**Catchers**: 6 Ed Bailey; 5 Tom Haller; 34 John Orsino; 2 Joe Pignatano; **Infielders**: 21 Ernie Bowman; 30 Orlando Cepeda; 12 Jim Davenport; 26 Chuck Hiller; 15 José Pagán; 17 Cap Peterson; 14 Dick Phillips	**Outfielders**: 23 Felipe Alou; 41 Matty Alou; 14 Carl Boles; 7 Harvey Kuenn; 24 Willie Mays; 44 Willie McCovey; 38 Manny Mota; 20 Bob Nieman	**Manager**: 1 Alvin Dark; **Coaches**: 46 Larry Jansen (Pitching); 3 Whitey Lockman (Third base); 9 Wes Westrum (First base)

== Player stats ==
= Indicates team leader

= Indicates league leader

=== Batting ===
==== Starters by position ====
Note: Pos = Position; G = Games played; AB = At bats; R = Runs scored; H = Hits; Avg. = Batting average; HR = Home runs; RBI = Runs batted in; SB = Stolen bases

Pos.	Player	G	AB	R	H	Avg.	HR	RBI	SB
C	Tom Haller	99	272	53	71	.261	18	55	1
1B	Orlando Cepeda	162	625	105	191	.306	35	114	10
2B	Chuck Hiller	161	602	94	166	.276	3	48	5
3B	Jim Davenport	144	485	83	144	.297	14	58	2
SS	José Pagán	164	580	73	150	.259	7	57	13
LF	Harvey Kuenn	130	487	73	148	.304	10	68	3
CF	Willie Mays	162	621	130	189	.304	49	141	18
RF	Felipe Alou	154	561	96	177	.316	25	98	10

==== Other batters ====
Note: G = Games played; AB = At bats; R = Runs scored; H = Hits; Avg. = Batting average; HR = Home runs; RBI = Runs batted in; SB = Stolen bases

Player	G	AB	R	H	Avg.	HR	RBI	SB
Ed Bailey	96	254	32	59	.232	17	45	1
Willie McCovey	91	229	41	67	.293	20	54	3
Matty Alou	78	195	28	57	.292	3	14	3
Manny Mota	47	74	9	13	.176	0	9	3
John Orsino	18	48	4	13	.271	0	4	0
Ernie Bowman	46	42	9	8	.190	1	4	0
Bob Nieman	30	30	1	9	.300	1	3	0
Carl Boles	19	24	4	9	.375	0	1	0
Cap Peterson	4	6	1	1	.167	0	0	0
Joe Pignatano	7	5	2	1	.200	0	0	0
Dick Phillips	5	3	1	0	.000	0	1	0

=== Pitching ===
==== Starting pitchers ====
Note: G = Games pitched; IP = Innings pitched; W = Wins; L = Losses; ERA = Earned run average; SO = Strikeouts

Player	G	IP	W	L	ERA	SO
Billy O'Dell	43	280.2	19	14	3.53	195
Jack Sanford	39	265.1	24	7	3.43	147
Juan Marichal	37	262.2	18	11	3.36	153
Billy Pierce	30	162.1	16	6	3.49	76

==== Other pitchers ====
Note: G = Games pitched; IP = Innings pitched; W = Wins; L = Losses; ERA = Earned run average; SO = Strikeouts

Player	G	IP	W	L	ERA	SO
Mike McCormick	28	98.2	5	5	5.38	42
Gaylord Perry	13	43.0	3	1	5.23	20

==== Relief pitchers ====
Note: G = Games pitched; W = Wins; L = Losses; SV = Saves; ERA = Earned run average; SO = Strikeouts

Player	G	W	L	SV	ERA	SO
Stu Miller	59	5	8	19	4.12	78
Don Larsen	49	5	4	11	4.38	58
Bobby Bolin	41	7	3	5	3.62	74
Jim Duffalo	24	1	2	0	3.64	29
Bob Garibaldi	9	0	0	1	5.11	9
Dick LeMay	9	0	1	1	7.71	5

== 1962 World Series ==
=== Game 1 ===
October 4, 1962, at Candlestick Park in San Francisco

Team	1	2	3	4	5	6	7	8	9	R	H	E
New York (A)	2	0	0	0	0	0	1	2	1	6	11	0
San Francisco (N)	0	1	1	0	0	0	0	0	0	2	10	0
W: Whitey Ford (1–0) L: Billy O'Dell (0–1)
HR: NYY – Clete Boyer (1)

Roger Maris' two-run double in the first inning set up Yankee starter Whitey Ford with a lead, but Willie Mays scored for the Giants in the second, ending Ford's record consecutive scoreless inning streak at 33 2/3. Chuck Hiller's double and Felipe Alou's hit in the third tied the game, but the Yankees broke the tie in the 7th on Clete Boyer's HR and scored three insurance runs in the final two innings. Ford's complete game victory was the first of six in the series, four for the Yankees and two for the Giants.

=== Game 2 ===
October 5, 1962, at Candlestick Park in San Francisco

Team	1	2	3	4	5	6	7	8	9	R	H	E
New York (A)	0	0	0	0	0	0	0	0	0	0	3	1
San Francisco (N)	1	0	0	0	0	0	1	0	x	2	6	0
W: Jack Sanford (1–0) L: Ralph Terry (0–1)
HR: SFG – Willie McCovey (1)

With the Giants protecting a 1–0 lead in the 7th inning, Willie McCovey smashed a tremendous home run over the right field fence to boost 24-game winner Jack Sanford to 2–0 shutout of the Yankees, who managed only 3 hits.

=== Game 3 ===
October 7, 1962, at Yankee Stadium in New York City

Team	1	2	3	4	5	6	7	8	9	R	H	E
San Francisco (N)	0	0	0	0	0	0	0	0	2	2	4	3
New York (A)	0	0	0	0	0	0	3	0	x	3	5	1
W:Bill Stafford (1–0) L: Billy Pierce (0–1)
HR: SFG – Ed Bailey (1)

The Yankees ended a scoreless tie in the 7th, scoring three times. Roger Maris drove a base hit off starter Billy Pierce for two runs batted in, and alert base-running allowed him to score the winning run in a 3–2 Yankee victory. Giants catcher Ed Bailey's 2-run homer in the top of the 9th left the Giants a run short.

=== Game 4 ===
October 8, 1962, at Yankee Stadium in New York City

Team	1	2	3	4	5	6	7	8	9	R	H	E
San Francisco (N)	0	2	0	0	0	0	4	0	1	7	9	1
New York (A)	0	0	0	0	0	2	0	0	1	3	9	1
W: Don Larsen (1–0) L: Jim Coates (0–1)
HR: SFG – Tom Haller (1), Chuck Hiller (1)

For the second time in two days, a Giants' catcher stroked a two-run homer when Tom Haller hit his off Whitey Ford in the second inning. After the Yankees tied the score at 2–2, second baseman Chuck Hiller hit the first National League grand slam in World Series history in the 7th, and the Giants went on to win 7–3. The game marked the only appearance in this series of future Hall-of-famer Juan Marichal, who started for the Giants.

Don Larsen was the winning pitcher in relief, six years to the day of his perfect game in the 1956 World Series.

=== Game 5 ===
October 10, 1962, at Yankee Stadium in New York City

Team	1	2	3	4	5	6	7	8	9	R	H	E
San Francisco (N)	0	0	1	0	1	0	0	0	1	3	8	2
New York (A)	0	0	0	1	0	1	0	3	x	5	6	0
W: Ralph Terry (1–1) L: Jack Sanford (1–1)
HR: SFG – José Pagán (1) NYY – Tom Tresh (1)

Hot hitting José Pagán drove in two runs with a single in the third and a home run in the 5th, but with the score tied 2–2 in the 8th, Tom Tresh walloped what proved to be the winning homer, a three-run shot that scored Bobby Richardson and Tony Kubek in front of him. With the series returning to San Francisco the Yankees had the edge, 3 games to 2, only to have the sixth game delayed four days by rain.

=== Game 6 ===
October 15, 1962, at Candlestick Park in San Francisco

Team	1	2	3	4	5	6	7	8	9	R	H	E
New York (A)	0	0	0	0	1	0	0	1	0	2	3	2
San Francisco (N)	0	0	0	3	2	0	0	0	x	5	10	1
W: Billy Pierce (1–1) L: Whitey Ford (1–1)
HR: NYY – Roger Maris (1)

In a battle of left-handed starting pitchers, Pierce out-dueled Ford and tossed a brilliant complete-game 3-hitter as the Giants evened the series at three wins apiece with a 5–2 victory. The Yankees' only runs came on a Maris solo home run in the 5th inning and an RBI single by Tony Kubek in the 8th inning.

=== Game 7 ===
October 16, 1962, at Candlestick Park in San Francisco

Team	1	2	3	4	5	6	7	8	9	R	H	E
New York (A)	0	0	0	0	1	0	0	0	0	1	7	0
San Francisco (N)	0	0	0	0	0	0	0	0	0	0	4	1
W: Ralph Terry (2–1) L: Jack Sanford (1–2)

The only run of this classic game occurred in the 5th inning when Tony Kubek grounded into a double play, with Bill Skowron scoring from third. Ralph Terry, pitching the seventh game instead of Jim Bouton because of the rain delays, had given up Bill Mazeroski's Series-winning walk-off home run two years earlier in Pittsburgh but in his third start completely stifled the Giants' power hitters.

In the bottom of the 9th, pinch-hitter Matty Alou, batting for relief pitcher Billy O'Dell, led off the inning with a bunt base hit after first having a foul ball dropped, but Terry struck out the next two batters, Felipe Alou and Hiller. Mays hit a double into the right field corner, but Maris brilliantly played the carom, then hit cut-off man Richardson with a throw that was relayed perfectly to home. Alou, already aware of Maris' great arm, stopped at third. Facing Willie McCovey with two outs, Terry elected to pitch to him rather than walk the bases loaded and bring up Orlando Cepeda. Terry's inside fastball on the second pitch completely handcuffed McCovey, who nonetheless adjusted his bat in mid-swing to extend his arms and hit what he later claimed was the hardest ball he had ever struck. The line drive appeared at first to be going over the head of a perfectly positioned Richardson, but was in fact sinking from topspin, and Richardson made the catch without leaping to end the game. The Yankees won their 20th World Championship; they would not win another World Championship until 1977. The Giants would not return to the World Series themselves until 1989.

== Awards and honors ==
1962 All-Star Game

- Felipe Alou
- Orlando Cepeda (starting 1B)
- Jim Davenport
- Juan Marichal
- Willie Mays (starting CF)

== Farm system ==
Level	Team	League	Manager
AAA	Tacoma Giants	Pacific Coast League	Red Davis
AA	El Paso Sun Kings	Texas League	George Genovese
A	Springfield Giants	Eastern League	Andy Gilbert
B	Eugene Emeralds	Northwest League	Bud Byerly
C	Fresno Giants	California League	Sal Taormina
D	Salem Rebels	Appalachian League	Alex Cosmidis
D	Lakeland Giants	Florida State League	Bert Haas and Max Lanier
D	Decatur Commodores	Midwest League	Richie Klaus
