= Ernie Bowman =

American baseball player (1935–2019)

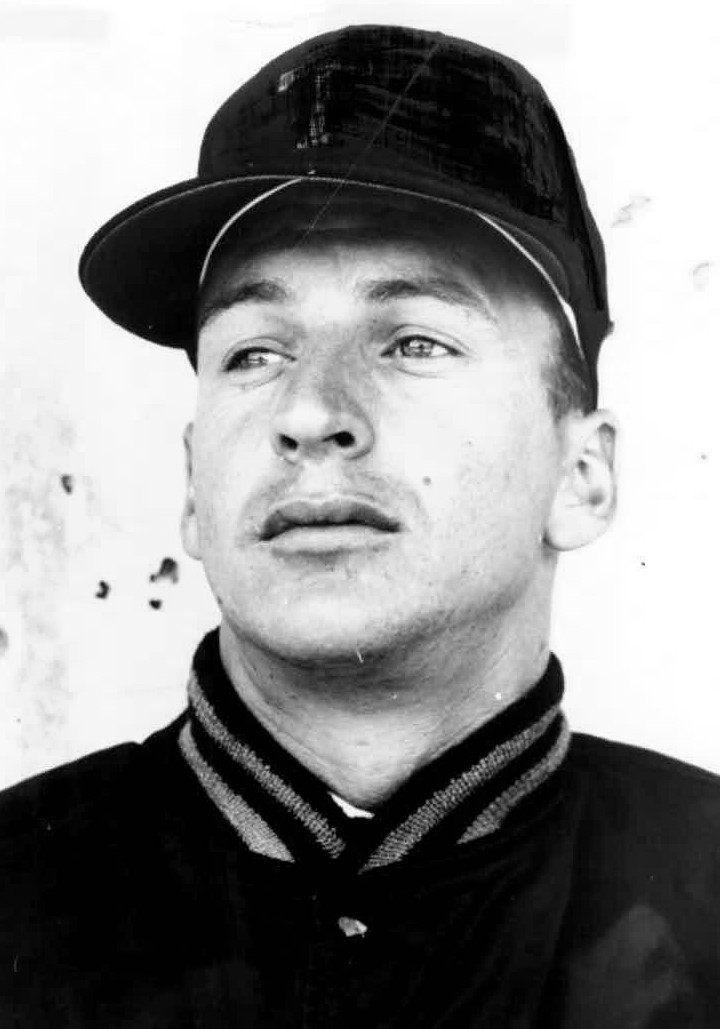
- Infielder
- Born: July 28, 1935; Johnson City, Tennessee, U.S.
- Died: August 4, 2019 (aged 84); Johnson City, Tennessee, U.S.
- Batted: Right Threw: Right

MLB debut
- April 12, 1961, for the San Francisco Giants

Last MLB appearance
- September 29, 1963, for the San Francisco Giants

MLB statistics
- Batting average: .190
- Home runs: 1
- Runs batted in: 10
- Stats at Baseball Reference

Teams
- San Francisco Giants (1961–1963)

Ernest Ferrell Bowman (July 28, 1935 – August 4, 2019) was an American professional baseball player, an infielder who appeared in 165 games in Major League Baseball for the San Francisco Giants from 1961 to 1963. Born in Johnson City, Tennessee, he batted and threw right-handed, stood 5 feet 10 inches (1.78 m) tall and weighed 160 pounds (73 kg).

Bowman was signed by the New York Giants as an amateur in 1956 after he attended East Tennessee State University. His professional career would encompass 14 seasons, although he spent only two full campaigns (1962–63) in the big leagues.

As a member of the San Francisco Giants, he served as the primary backup to the club's regular shortstop, José Pagán, and second baseman, Chuck Hiller. He was a member of the 1962 National League champion Giants. On August 23, his only MLB home run off Al Jackson of the New York Mets at the Polo Grounds was a key blow in San Francisco's 2–1 victory. He also appeared in two games of the Giants' tie-breaker series against the Los Angeles Dodgers, and in two games of the 1962 World Series against the New York Yankees. In the latter series, Bowman batted once against Marshall Bridges in Game 4 at Yankee Stadium and flied out to right fielder Roger Maris.

Bowman remained with the Giants through the 1963 season, when he appeared in a career-high 81 games, including 26 as the starting shortstop and another two as the starting second baseman. At the end of the season, he was traded to the Milwaukee Braves in a seven-player deal whose principals included Felipe Alou, Ed Bailey, Bob Shaw and Del Crandall. But the Braves sent Bowman to Triple-A in 1964, and he never appeared again in the major leagues. Altogether, he collected 39 hits during his big-league career, including four doubles, two triples and his one home run. He batted .190 and collected ten runs batted in. He retired in 1969.

Ernie Bowman died at his home in Johnson City on August 4, 2019.
