= Chuck Hiller =

American baseball player (1934–2004)

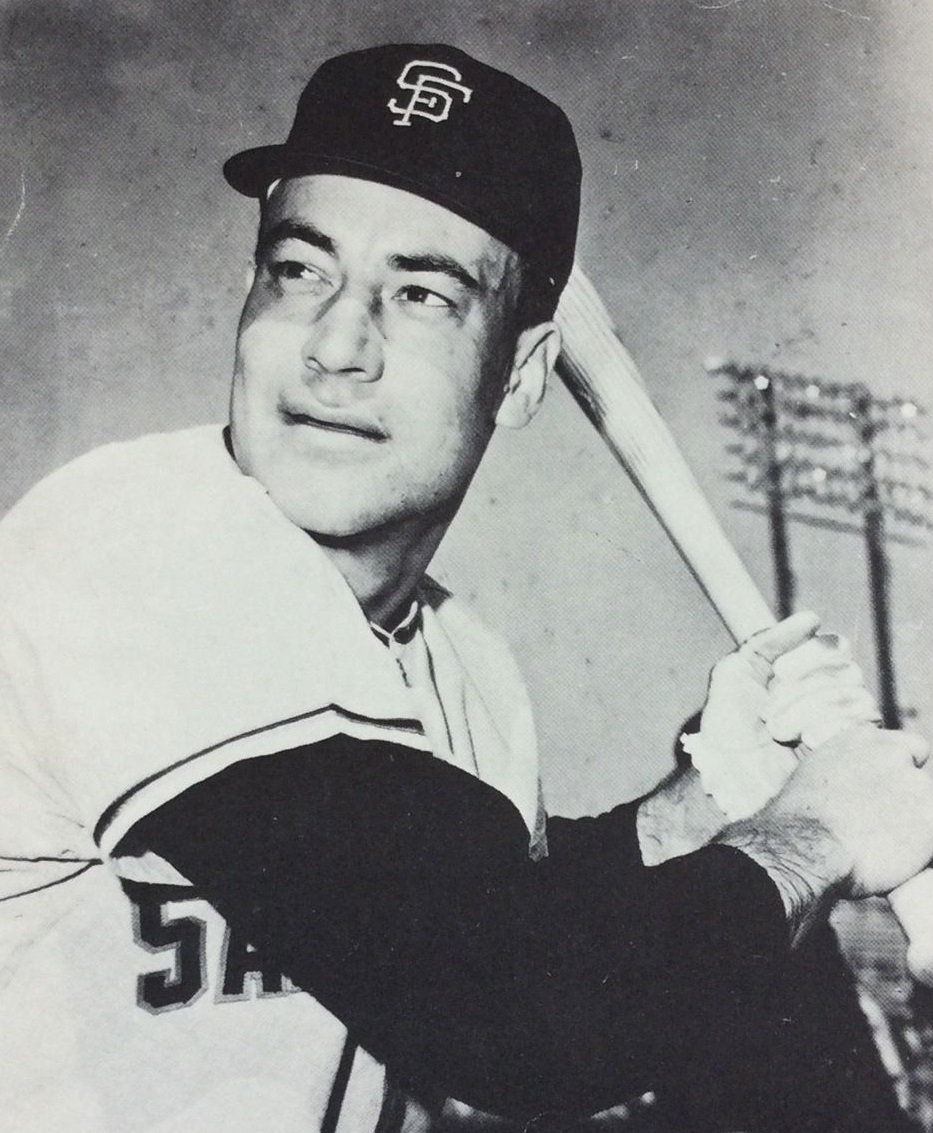
- Hiller in 1961
- Second baseman
- Born: October 1, 1934; Johnsburg, Illinois, U.S.
- Died: October 20, 2004 (aged 70); St. Pete Beach, Florida, U.S.
- Batted: Left Threw: Right

MLB debut
- April 11, 1961, for the San Francisco Giants

Last MLB appearance
- June 2, 1968, for the Pittsburgh Pirates

MLB statistics
- Batting average: .243
- Home runs: 20
- Runs batted in: 152
- Stats at Baseball Reference

Teams
- San Francisco Giants (1961–1965); New York Mets (1965–1967); Philadelphia Phillies (1967); Pittsburgh Pirates (1968)

Career highlights and awards
- World Series champion (1982)

Charles Joseph Hiller (October 1, 1934 – October 20, 2004) was an American Major League Baseball second baseman. In the 1962 World Series, he became the first National League player to hit a grand slam in a World Series.

Hiller batted left-handed, threw right-handed, and was listed as 5 feet 11 inches (1.80 m) tall and 170 pounds (77 kg). After his playing days ended, he spent the rest of his life in baseball as a coach and manager.

== University of St. Thomas ==
After graduating from McHenry East High School in McHenry, Illinois, Hiller attended the University of St. Thomas in Minneapolis and St. Paul, Minnesota. As a junior in 1955, Hiller batted .576. In 1956, he batted cleanup for the Tommies' Minnesota Intercollegiate Athletic Conference championship team. Hiller was inducted into the National College Baseball Hall of Fame in 1973.

== Minor leagues ==
He was signed by the Cleveland Indians in 1957. Over two seasons in Cleveland's farm system, he batted .288 with nineteen home runs. On December 2, 1958 he was drafted by the San Francisco Giants in the minor league baseball draft.

In 1960, Hiller was the Texas League Player of the Year, when he batted .334 with three home runs and 74 runs batted in for the Rio Grande Valley Giants. Over two seasons, he batted .337 with 151 RBIs.

== San Francisco Giants ==
=== Rookie season ===
Hiller was awarded the starting second base job to start the 1961 season. He went 1-for-4 in his major league debut on opening day, but the 0-for-21 stretch that followed his first major league hit got him in more of a platoon with the righty hitting Joey Amalfitano.

He managed to get his batting average up to .143 by the first time he went into Los Angeles to face the Dodgers on April 25 and 26. Hiller feasted on Dodgers pitching. He led off game one of the two game set with a double, and came around to score the first run of the game on Willie McCovey's single. In the second game, with the Giants trailing 3–2, he led off the eighth inning with a double, and came around to score the tying run on Willie Mays' single. Overall, Hiller went 4-for-10 with three doubles and three runs scored in the Giants' two-game sweep of the Los Angeles Dodgers.

His hitting steadily improved from there. On April 30, he went 3-for-6 with two doubles and two runs scored in a 14–4 walloping of the Milwaukee Braves. On May 30, he hit his first major league home run off the Cincinnati Reds' Jim Brosnan. For the month of June, he batted .292 to bring his average to .233.

He was hampered, however, by poor fielding. Playing the Philadelphia Phillies on June 5, Hiller mishandled Harvey Kuenn's throw from third on what should have been a routine double play. The next batter, Pancho Herrera, followed with a lead-changing three-run home run. On June 11, his second inning error on a Smoky Burgess ground ball opened the door for the Pittsburgh Pirates to score four runs. It was his seventh error of the season, and played into the decision to demote Hiller to the triple A Tacoma Giants in early July.

Hiller tore up the Pacific Coast League to the tune of a .324 batting average, five home runs and 32 RBIs to get a call back up to the majors in September. He went 3-for-5 with a run scored in his first game back in the majors, and batted .289 over the rest of the season. He also committed just one inconsequential error for a .980 fielding percentage. His rookie year, Hiller batted .238 with two home runs, twelve RBIs and 38 runs scored. He committed eight errors for a .973 fielding percentage.

=== Starting second baseman ===
Amalfitano's selection by the Houston Colt .45s in the 1962 Major League Baseball expansion draft led Giants brass to openly attempt to acquire a new second baseman before the 1962 season began. Unsuccessful, Hiller became the 1962 Giants' de facto full-time second baseman despite a poor Spring training.

Usually batting second or lead off, Hiller understood his role. He had a career high 166 hits that led to a career high 94 runs scored in front of the power bats of Mays, McCovey, Felipe Alou and Orlando Cepeda. He would also set career highs in games played (161), doubles (22) and RBIs (48). On a negative note, he also paced major league second basemen with 29 errors.

The Giants and Dodgers were embroiled in a season long battle for first place in the NL. The Dodgers were two games up on the Giants, and needed just one win when they went into St. Louis for a three-game set against the St. Louis Cardinals to end the season. The Dodgers were swept, resulting in the teams ending their 162-game schedules with identical 101-61 records, and setting up a three game tie-breaker series. The Giants won the series to face the New York Yankees in the World Series. Hiller went 3-for-10 with an RBI and a run scored.

=== 1962 World Series ===
The Giants lost game one of the World Series at home (Hiller went 1-for-4 with a run scored). They scored early in game two, when Hiller led off the Giants' half of the first inning with a double, and scored on Matty Alou's ground out. It would turn out to be all the run support Jack Sanford needed, as he held the Yankees to three hits in a complete game shutout.

After losing game three at Yankee Stadium, the Giants had a 2–0 lead in game four thanks to catcher Tom Haller's two-run home run. The Yankees, however, came back with two in the sixth to tie the score. Jim Davenport walked to lead off the seventh, and the Giants put runners on second and third when Matty Alou doubled. Yankees pitcher Marshall Bridges entered the game, and intentionally walked his first batter, Bob Nieman to load the bases for Harvey Kuenn. Kuenn popped out to third, bringing Hiller to the plate with two outs.

Hiller struck out in his previous at bat with two outs and the bases loaded. This time, he came through. He drove Bridges' fastball into the front row in the right field stands for the first grand slam in World Series play by a National Leaguer. He drove in an additional run in the ninth (unearned run, no RBI credited) in the Giants' 7–3 victory.

Hiller also drove in the first run of game five, ultimately won by the Yankees, 5–3. In game six, he scored the Giants' fifth and final run. Hiller was held hitless, and struck out in the ninth in Ralph Terry's game seven four hit gem that brought the Yankees their 20th World Series title.

In his only World Series, Hiller batted .269 (7-for-26) and turned seven double plays during the seven game series. He led the Giants with five RBIs and four runs scored, both of which also tied Roger Maris for the most in the series.

=== 1963 season ===
After going 2-for-5 with an RBI in the Giants' 9–2 opening day victory, Hiller's 1963 season took a sharp downward turn. On April 20, he committed three errors in a 4–0 loss to the Chicago Cubs. He also went 0-for-4 to drop his season average to .119. The table setter in the lead off spot a year ago scored just one run the first month of the season. He also didn't collect a second RBI until the final game of the month. On May 1, he fractured his wrist, sidelining him for a month.

He led off the June 6 contest with the Cubs with a double to end an 0-for-27 skid. He showed steady improvement from there, batting .286 with nine runs over the rest of the month.

On June 15, future Hall of Famer Juan Marichal and the Colt .45s' Dick Drott embarked on a classic pitchers' duel. Al Spangler drew a walk off Marichal in the fifth for Houston's first base runner. Drott gave up a single to Mays in the first, but did not give up a second hit until Davenport led off the eighth with a double. Two batters later, Hiller doubled, driving in the only run of Marichal's only career no-hitter.

He clubbed his first home run of the season on June 19 against the Dodgers' Larry Sherry. His second was a walk off against the Pirates on July 26. An exceptional month of August (.289 avg., 3 HR, 13 RBI, 14 runs) helped him end the season with a somewhat acceptable .223 average, 33 RBIs and 44 runs. His six home runs were a career high.

His disappointing performance in 1963 made him a question mark heading into the 1964 season. Through mid-June, Hiller batted .189 with one home run, twelve RBIs, seventeen runs and six errors on the field. The Giants made the decision to move on to rookie prospect Hal Lanier. Over the remainder of the season, Hiller made just 65 plate appearances, and batted .158 with five RBIs and four runs scored.

== New York Mets ==
When All-Star second baseman Ron Hunt separated his shoulder early in the 1965 season, the New York Mets purchased Hiller from the Giants. Hiller batted .258 with three home runs, twelve RBIs and sixteen runs in Hunt's absence. He also committed eleven errors at second, including three consecutive games May 18–20.

Upon Hunt's return, the Mets tried Hiller at third (he played one game at third with the Giants), and he made his debut as an outfielder on August 14. Overall, Hiller batted .238 with five home runs, 21 RBIs and 24 runs. He also hit one home run with the Giants to match his career high of six total.

He became manager Wes Westrum's favorite bat off the bench in 1966. On April 29, his extra innings pinch hit single drove in the winning run against the Pirates. Through June, Hiller batted .328 to prompt Westrum to find a position for him on the field to get his bat in the line up. In July, he began seeing more playing time at third and in the outfield. The Mets posted a winning record in July (18–14) for their first winning month in franchise history. Hiller batted .321.

He cooled off in the last two months of the season (.217, 1 HR, 5 RBI, 7 runs), but he still batted a career-best .280 for the season. He batted .348 as a pinch hitter with three walks. His sixteen pinch hits led the NL.

After the season, Hunt and Jim Hickman were traded to the Dodgers for Tommy Davis and Derrell Griffith. Unfortunately, Hiller squandered his opportunity to become the Mets' starting second baseman in 1967 by batting .111 with two RBIs through the first month of the season. An injury sidelined him for the month of May. When he returned, he had just one hit in eighteen at bats. Meanwhile, Jerry Buchek, acquired from the Cardinals at the end of Spring training for Eddie Bressoud and Danny Napoleon, played well enough to earn the starting job (.230 avg., 8 HR, 19 RBI). During the All-Star break, Hiller was traded to the Phillies for ex-Yankee infielder Phil Linz.

== Coaching ==
Hiller made just four starts, and was used mostly as a pinch hitter in Philadelphia. After the season, he was sent to the minors, and selected by the Pirates in the rule 5 draft. He spent most of the 1968 season with the triple A Columbus Jets, batting .275 in 87 games. He made eleven appearances with the Pirates, going 5-for-13 with a double. After the season, he retired, and became manager of the Salem Rebels in the Carolina League.

Hiller returned to the Mets in a similar capacity, working for the Mets' director of player development, Whitey Herzog, through 1972. Hiller then served under manager Herzog as an MLB coach with the Texas Rangers, Kansas City Royals and Cardinals, and later spent brief terms in the post with the Giants and the Mets. In between Hiller's major-league assignments, he served the Mets as a longtime infield instructor in their minor league system, and managed in the Cardinals' organization.

On October 20, 2004, Hiller died from leukemia at age 70 in St. Pete Beach, Florida.

== Career statistics ==
Seasons	Games	PA	AB	Runs	Hits	2B	3B	HR	RBI	SB	BB	SO	Avg.	OBP	OPS	Fld%	WAR
8	704	2344	2121	253	516	76	9	20	152	14	157	187	.243	.299	.615	.967	2.7

== See also ==
- List of St. Louis Cardinals coaches

Sporting positions
Preceded by Don Hoak	Salem Rebels Manager; 1969	Succeeded by Billy Klaus
Preceded by Clyde McCullough	Tidewater Tides Manager; 1970	Succeeded by Hank Bauer
Preceded by Terry Christman	Marion Mets Manager; 1971-1972	Succeeded by Owen Friend
Preceded by Wayne Terwilliger	Texas Rangers third base coach 1973	Succeeded by Frank Lucchesi
Preceded by Owen Friend	Marion Mets Manager; 1974-1975	Succeeded by Billy Connors
Preceded by Harry Dunlop	Kansas City Royals third base coach 1976–1979	Succeeded by Gordon Mackenzie
Preceded by Gene Hassell	Kingsport Mets Manager; 1980	Succeeded by Al Jackson
Preceded by Jack Krol	St. Louis Cardinals third base coach 1981–1983	Succeeded by Nick Leyva
Preceded by Rich Hacker	Johnson City Cardinals Manager; 1984	Succeeded by Rich Hacker
Preceded by Danny Ozark	San Francisco Giants third base coach 1985	Succeeded by Gordon Mackenzie
Preceded by Tucker Ashford	Kingsport Mets Manager; 1986	Succeeded by Bobby Floyd
Preceded by Bud Harrelson	New York Mets third base coach 1990	Succeeded by Mike Cubbage
