= Bob Nieman =

American baseball player and scout (1927–1985)

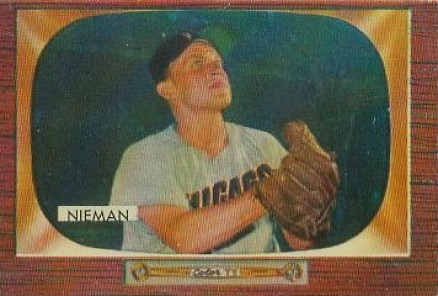
- Outfielder
- Born: January 26, 1927; Cincinnati, Ohio, U.S.
- Died: March 10, 1985 (aged 58); Corona, California, U.S.
- Batted: Right Threw: Right

MLB debut
- September 14, 1951, for the St. Louis Browns

Last MLB appearance
- October 3, 1962, for the San Francisco Giants

MLB statistics
- Batting average: .295
- Home runs: 125
- Runs batted in: 544

NPB statistics
- Batting average: .301
- Home runs: 13
- Runs batted in: 53
- Stats at Baseball Reference

Teams
- St. Louis Browns (1951–1952); Detroit Tigers (1953–1954); Chicago White Sox (1955–1956); Baltimore Orioles (1956–1959); St. Louis Cardinals (1960–1961); Cleveland Indians (1961–1962); San Francisco Giants (1962); Chunichi Dragons (1963)

Robert Charles Nieman (January 26, 1927 – March 10, 1985) was an American professional baseball player and scout. An outfielder, he spent all or parts of a dozen Major League Baseball seasons with the St. Louis Browns (1951–52), Detroit Tigers (1953–54), Chicago White Sox (1955–56), Baltimore Orioles (1956–59), St. Louis Cardinals (1960–61), Cleveland Indians (1961–62) and San Francisco Giants (1962). He also played one season in Japan for the Chunichi Dragons (1963). He threw and batted right-handed, stood 5 feet 11 inches (1.80 m) tall and weighed 195 pounds (88 kg).

== Career ==
=== Minor leagues ===
Nieman was born in Cincinnati. After attending Kent State University, he was signed by his hometown Reds as an amateur free agent in 1948. He spent three full seasons and part of a fourth in the Cincinnati farm system, although he played only 38 games above the Class A level. In June 1951, he was acquired by the unaffiliated Oklahoma City Indians from the Reds' Tulsa Oilers farm team, and he played 109 games for the 1951 Indians and batted .328. (His combined average, his tenure with Tulsa included, of .324 won him the batting title of the Texas League.)

=== Major leagues ===
Nieman then was purchased by the Browns and was added to their active roster in September 1951, setting the stage for his dramatic big league debut. On September 14, 1951 at Fenway Park, Nieman hit two home runs in his first two major league at-bats. The blows—a solo home run in the second inning and a two-run shot in the third—were hit off Red Sox left-hander Mickey McDermott. Nieman added a single and drove in three runs on the day, but Boston won the game, 9–6. Nieman became the first player in big league history to hit two homers during his first game in consecutive at bats (let alone in his first two Major League career at-bats), and the second player in MLB history to hit two home runs in his first game, behind Charlie Reilly, who became the first in 1889. (Note: Nieman is still widely considered the first MLB player to hit two home runs in his debut game (even non-consecutively) as well, since Reilly's two-home run debut game happened before what is loosely viewed as MLB's "modern era".) Bert Campaneris (1964), Mark Quinn (1999), J.P. Arencibia (2010) and Trevor Story (2016) are the only others to accomplish the feat of homering twice in their first game. Also, Nieman is one of only three players in MLB history to homer in each of his first two big league at bats. Keith McDonald, in 2000, became the second, though McDonald's first two at-bats came in separate games. Nieman remained the only player in history to hit these two home runs in his first two consecutive at-bats within the same game, until 2026, when Joshua Baez hit home runs in his first three Major League at bats, all within the same game, becoming the only player to claim this accomplishment.

Nieman became an everyday outfielder for the Browns, later played regularly for the Tigers and Orioles, and overall he fashioned a 12-year career as a semi-regular outfielder and pinch hitter. In his 1,113-game career he batted .295, with 125 home runs, 544 RBI, 455 runs, 1,018 hits, 180 doubles, 32 triples and 10 stolen bases. He batted over .300 three times, twice as a regular outfielder with more than 400 at bats.

In his final MLB campaign, he collected eight pinch hits to help the Giants win the 1962 National League pennant. In the 1962 World Series, and in his only postseason opportunity and last big-league plate appearance, Nieman pinch hit for Ed Bailey in the seventh inning of Game 4 at Yankee Stadium. He drew a base on balls against left-hander Marshall Bridges and was removed for a pinch runner, Ernie Bowman. Bowman would soon score when Giants' second baseman Chuck Hiller hit the first grand slam home run ever struck by a National League player in World Series history. The Giants won that contest, 7–3, but dropped the series in seven games.

=== Scout ===
After retiring from the field, Nieman served as a scout for over two decades, working for the Indians, Dodgers, Athletics, White Sox and Yankees.

He died as a result of a massive heart attack in Corona, California, at 58 years of age.

== See also ==
- Home run in first Major League at-bat
