= Jim Duffalo =

American baseball player (born 1935)

- Pitcher
- Born: November 25, 1935 (age 90); Helvetia, Pennsylvania, U.S.
- Batted: Right Threw: Right

MLB debut
- April 12, 1961, for the San Francisco Giants

Last MLB appearance
- September 10, 1965, for the Cincinnati Reds

MLB statistics
- Win–loss record: 15–8
- Earned run average: 3.39
- Strikeouts: 210
- Stats at Baseball Reference

Teams
- San Francisco Giants (1961–1965); Cincinnati Reds (1965)

James Francis Duffalo (born November 25, 1935) is an American former professional baseball player. A right-handed relief pitcher, Duffalo played all or part of five seasons (1961–65) in Major League Baseball, and 18 years in organized baseball as a whole. He was a member of the 1962 National League champion San Francisco Giants, but did not appear in the 1962 World Series.

Listed at 6 feet 1 inch (1.85 m) and 175 pounds (79 kg), Duffalo entered the professional ranks as a member of the Pittsburgh Pirates' farm system in 1955, winning 17 games as a rookie in the Class D Georgia–Florida League in 1955, then another 16 games in the Class B Carolina League the following season. But the Pirates sent him to the Giants during the 1958 season.

Duffalo made his Major League debut on April 12, 1961, for the Giants in a 2–1 win over the Pirates at Candlestick Park. He entered the game with two on and two outs in the ninth inning against Roberto Clemente, who grounded out to end the game, and Duffalo was credited with a save. His best years were in 1963 and 1964; in 1963 he pitched 34 games with a 4–2 record and a 2.87 earned run average, followed in 1964 with 35 games and a 5–1 record with a 2.92 ERA. Duffalo would play 119 of his 141 Major League games for the San Francisco Giants.

He was traded to the Cincinnati Reds for left-handed relief specialist Bill Henry on May 4, 1965. In 22 games he was 0–0 with a 3.45 ERA in what would be his last Major League season. However, he spent another seven seasons in minor league baseball before his retirement in 1972 at age 36.

He compiled a 15–8 record with six saves and an ERA of 3.39 during his MLB career, starting 14 games, all for the Giants, and relieving in 127 games. In 297 2/3 innings pitched, he allowed 238 hits and 155 bases on balls, with 210 strikeouts.

As a minor league hurler, Duffalo was 110–72 with an ERA of 3.48 in 387 games and 1,655 innings pitched. He briefly coached in the Giants' farm system after his playing career ended.
