= Marion Mets =

American minor league baseball team

The Marion Mets were a minor league baseball team based in Marion, Virginia that played in the Appalachian League from 1965 to 1976. They were affiliated with the New York Mets and played their home games at the Marion High School baseball field. Hall of Fame pitcher Nolan Ryan pitched for the team in 1965.

== Year-by-year record ==
Year	Record	Finish	Manager	Playoffs
1965	37-33	3rd	Pete Pavlick	none
1966	43-26	1st	Buddy Peterson	League Champs
1967	37-27	2nd	Birdie Tebbetts	none
1968	42-30	1st	Lloyd Gearhart	League Champs
1969	37-32	2nd (t)	Jack Cassini	none
1970	23-36	7th	Terry Christman	none
1971	33-35	5th (t)	Chuck Hiller	none
1972	22-45	8th	Chuck Hiller	none
1973	36-33	5th	Owen Friend	none
1974	33-35	4th	Chuck Hiller	none
1975	35-33	4th	Chuck Hiller (19-14) / Bill Connors (16-19)	none
1976	28-42	6th	Tom Egan	none

== Notable alumni ==
Baseball Hall of Fame alumni

- Nolan Ryan (1965) Inducted, 1999

Notable alumni

- Jim Bibby (1965) MLB All-Star
- Jody Davis (1976) 2 x MLB All-Star
- Ed Figueroa (1966)
- Tim Foli (1968)
- Mike Jorgensen (1966)
- John Milner (1968)
- Jerry Morales (1966) MLB All-Star
- Joe Nolan (1969)
- Steve Renko (1965)
- Birdie Tebbetts (1967, MGR) 4 x MLB All-Star
- Alex Trevino (1974)
- Kelvin Chapman (1975)
