= Tom Haller =

American baseball player (1937–2004)

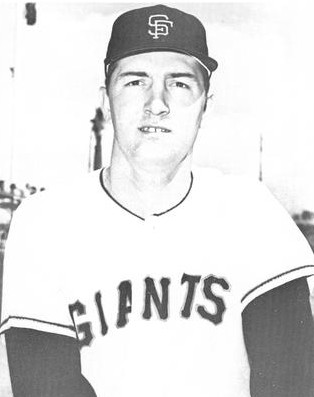
- Catcher
- Born: June 23, 1937; Lockport, Illinois, U.S.
- Died: November 26, 2004 (aged 67); Los Angeles, California, U.S.
- Batted: Left Threw: Right

MLB debut
- April 11, 1961, for the San Francisco Giants

Last MLB appearance
- October 4, 1972, for the Detroit Tigers

MLB statistics
- Batting average: .257
- Home runs: 134
- Runs batted in: 504
- Stats at Baseball Reference

Teams
- San Francisco Giants (1961–1967); Los Angeles Dodgers (1968–1971); Detroit Tigers (1972)

Career highlights and awards
- 3× All-Star (1966–1968); San Francisco Giants Wall of Fame

Thomas Frank Haller (June 23, 1937 – November 26, 2004) was an American professional baseball player, coach, and executive. He played as a catcher in Major League Baseball (MLB) from 1961 to 1972, most notably as a member of the San Francisco Giants where he made two of his three All-Star teams. Haller ended his playing career with the Los Angeles Dodgers and the Detroit Tigers.

Haller was considered one of the top catchers in the National League (NL) during the late 1960s. In 2008, he was part of the inaugural class of inductees into the San Francisco Giants Wall of Fame.

== Major League career ==
Haller was born in Lockport, Illinois, and attended the University of Illinois, where he played as a quarterback for the Illinois Fighting Illini football team. During his time at the university, Haller was also a member of Theta Chi fraternity. Haller was signed by the San Francisco Giants, as an amateur free agent, in 1958. After playing in the minor leagues for three seasons, he made his major league debut with the Giants on April 11, 1961, at the age of 24.

Haller hit .261, with 18 home runs, and 55 Run batted in (RBI), for the Giants in 1962, in a platoon system, alongside Ed Bailey, although both catchers were left-handed hitters. Haller and Bailey combined to give the Giants 35 home runs and 100 runs batted in from the catcher's position as they battled the Los Angeles Dodgers in a tight pennant race. The two teams ended the season tied for first place and met in the 1962 National League tie-breaker series. The Giants won the three-game series to clinch the National League championship. The Giants then lost to the New York Yankees in the 1962 World Series in seven games. Haller collected four hits in 14 at-bats, with a home run, and three RBI, during the Series.

Haller continued to platoon with Bailey through the 1963 season, finishing the year second to Johnny Edwards among National League catchers in fielding percentage. In December 1963, the Giants traded Bailey to the Milwaukee Braves for veteran catcher Del Crandall, and Haller became their undisputed starting catcher. He was a solid defensive catcher for the Giants from 1964 to 1967. In his book, The Bill James Historical Baseball Abstract, baseball historian Bill James said the decision to give Joe Torre a 1965 National League Gold Glove Award was absurd, stating that Torre was given the award because of his offensive statistics and that either Haller or John Roseboro was more deserving of the award. Haller also helped offensively in 1965, hitting two home runs and driving in five runs during a game on September 27 to put the Giants in first place with one week left in the season. However, the Giants faltered and ended the season two games behind the Los Angeles Dodgers.

The following season, Haller earned his first All-Star berth when he was named as a reserve player for the National League team in the 1966 All-Star Game. He was the catcher for two twenty-game winners in 1966, as Juan Marichal won 25 games and Gaylord Perry won 21 games. Haller finished the season with career-highs of 27 home runs and 67 runs batted in, as the Giants once again finished second to the Dodgers, by a game and a half. He earned his second consecutive All-Star berth in 1967 when he was named as a reserve for the National League team in the 1967 All-Star Game. Haller ended the 1967 season second to Tim McCarver among NL catchers in assists and in fielding percentage, and guided the Giants' pitching staff to the lowest team earned run average (ERA) in the National League, as Giants pitcher, Mike McCormick, won the National League Cy Young Award, with a 22-10 record. The Giants finished in second place for a third consecutive season, this time to the St. Louis Cardinals.

In February 1968, the Giants were in need of good infielders, and with four young catching prospects, including Dick Dietz and Dave Rader, club president Chub Feeney decided to trade Haller along with a player to be named later, to the Dodgers, for infielders Ron Hunt and Nate Oliver. The trade was the first between the two teams since their move to the West Coast in 1958, and also the first since the one that would have sent Jackie Robinson from the Dodgers to the Giants after the 1956 season. Haller played well in 1968, posting a .285 batting average, in 144 games, and earned his third consecutive All-Star berth. He also played well defensively with career-highs in assists (83) and in double plays (23). He guided the Dodgers' pitching staff to the second best team earned run average in the league, although the team finished the season in seventh place.

After spending four seasons with the Dodgers, Haller was traded to the Detroit Tigers, in December 1971. He batted .207 with two home runs and 12 runs batted in during the 1972 season as a backup catcher for Bill Freehan, when the Tigers won the American League Eastern Division championship. Haller was the younger brother of American League (AL) umpire Bill Haller and in July 1972, the two men appeared in the same game with Tom catching for the Tigers while Bill stood behind him as the home plate umpire. His playing time was reduced when the Tigers acquired catcher Duke Sims in August. In the 1972 American League Championship Series against the Oakland Athletics, Haller made only one appearance as a pinch hitter in Game 2, as the Tigers lost the series in five games. In October 1972, the Tigers sold Haller to the Philadelphia Phillies along with pitcher Don Leshnock. Haller then made the decision to retire at the age of 35.

== Career statistics ==
In a twelve-year major league career, Haller played in 1,294 games, accumulating 1,011 hits, in 3,935 at bats, for a .257 career batting average, along with 134 home runs, 504 runs batted in, and an on-base percentage of .340. A three-time All-Star, he was a more-than-capable defensive catcher, ending his career with a respectable .992 fielding percentage which, at the time of his retirement, was second only to the .993 career record of Elston Howard. Haller led National League catchers in putouts in 1965, and in baserunners caught stealing in 1968. He set the NL single-season record for double plays by a catcher with 23 in 1968. Haller led the NL in sacrifice flies, in 1968, with 9. Haller caught for six pitchers who would eventually be inducted into the Baseball Hall of Fame. He caught 107 shutouts during his career, ranking him 23rd all-time among major league catchers. Baseball historian Bill James ranked Haller 26th all-time among major league catchers.

== Coaching and executive career ==
After his playing career ended, Haller worked for the Giants as a coach (1977–1979), and was their vice president of baseball operations (1981–1985). He was named to the Giants' 25th anniversary team, in 1982. Early in the 1986 baseball season, Haller served as the manager of the minor league Double-A Birmingham Barons, of the Southern League (an affiliate of the Chicago White Sox). On June 9, 1986, Haller was named as the General Manager of the White Sox, but disagreements with executive Ken Harrelson led to Haller resigning at the end of the season.

After a long illness, Haller died, in Los Angeles, on November 26, 2004, at the age of 67.
