= Terry Christman =

Terry Lee Christman (December 11, 1943) has held multiple roles in professional baseball.

He pitched and played outfield in the New York Mets system from 1965 to 1969 and from 1971 to 1972. At the plate, he hit .250 with 12 home runs in 752 at-bats and on the mound - where he found considerably greater success - he was 27-19 with a 3.02 ERA in 100 appearances (43 starts).

In 1970, he managed the Marion Mets, in 1971 he managed the Key West Sun Caps and in 1983, he managed the Great Falls Giants.

Terry is married with 2 grown daughters Kerri and Kasey, and 4 lovely grandkids Sami, Sean, Joe, and Leo.

In 2012, he worked as an umpire observer for Major League Baseball. He has also refereed NCAA basketball, worked as an instructor for the San Francisco Giants and Kansas City Royals, worked as a minor league pitching coach and pitching chart coordinator for the Giants and Oakland Athletics and coached high school and college baseball.

He was born in San Francisco, California.
