= Bob Bolin =

American baseball player (1939–2023)

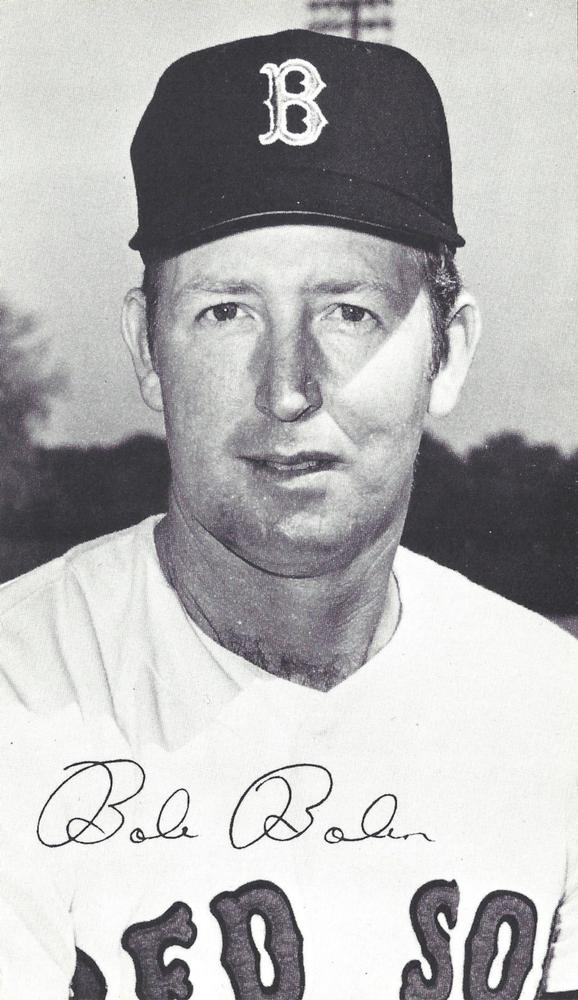
- Pitcher
- Born: January 29, 1939; Hickory Grove, South Carolina, U.S.
- Died: June 2, 2023 (aged 84); Easley, South Carolina, U.S.
- Batted: Right Threw: Right

MLB debut
- April 18, 1961, for the San Francisco Giants

Last MLB appearance
- September 30, 1973, for the Boston Red Sox

MLB statistics
- Win–loss record: 88–75
- Earned run average: 3.40
- Strikeouts: 1,175
- Stats at Baseball Reference

Teams
- San Francisco Giants (1961–1969); Milwaukee Brewers (1970); Boston Red Sox (1970–1973)

Career highlights and awards
- San Francisco Giants Wall of Fame

Bobby Donald Bolin (January 29, 1939 – June 2, 2023) was an American professional baseball pitcher who appeared in 495 games in Major League Baseball over 13 seasons (1961–1973) for the San Francisco Giants (1961–1969), Milwaukee Brewers (1970) and Boston Red Sox (1970–1973). A right-hander, Bolin was born in Hickory Grove, South Carolina, reared on the family farm near Smyrna, South Carolina, and was listed as 6 feet 4 inches (1.93 m) tall and 185 pounds (84 kg).

== Career ==
Bolin entered pro ball after signing with the New York Giants on November 10, 1956, at the age of 17 out of Hickory Grove High School (South Carolina. He spent four seasons moving up through the Giants' farm system until making the San Francisco roster in the spring of 1961.

Bolin began and ended his 13-year career as a relief pitcher, but from 1964 to 1970 he started for the majority of his appearances. He reached double figures in victories four times, and triple figures in strikeouts six times, as a Giant. In 1968, Bolin had the second-best earned run average (ERA) in the National League, 1.99, behind only Bob Gibson's record-setting mark of 1.12. Bolin finished in the NL's top ten three times for ERA, WHIP, and hit batsmen, and twice for shutouts, strikeouts per nine innings pitched, winning percentage and bases on balls allowed.

As a relief pitcher, Bolin set a career-high with a club-leading 15 saves for the 1973 Red Sox, but Boston released him at the conclusion of spring training in 1974, ending Bolin's career.

In all, Bolin pitched in 495 major league games (164 starts), with 32 complete games, ten shutouts and 161 games finished. He posted a career won–lost mark of 88–75, with 50 saves and an ERA of 3.40, permitting 1,387 hits and 597 bases on balls (along with 1,175 strikeouts) in 1,576 innings pitched. As a member of the 1962 National League champion Giants (for whom Bolin went 7–3 with six saves), he appeared in two games of the 1962 World Series against the New York Yankees, allowing four hits and two earned runs in 22/3 innings pitched.

== Personal life ==
Bolin died June 2, 2023, at the age of 84.
