= Dick LeMay =

American baseball player (1938–2018)

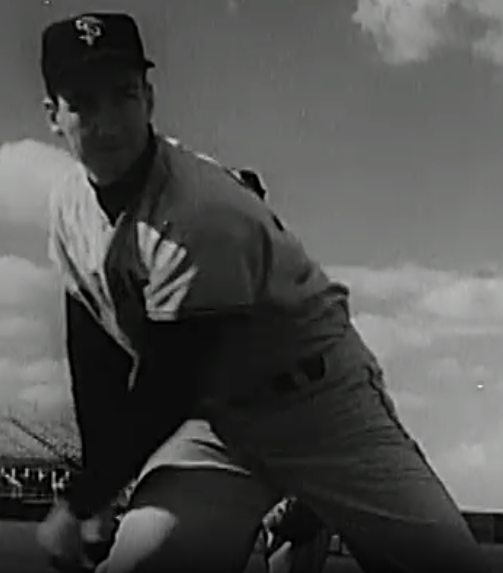
- LeMay with the San Francisco Giants in 1962
- Pitcher
- Born: August 28, 1938; Cincinnati, Ohio, U.S.
- Died: March 19, 2018 (aged 79); Kansas City, Missouri, U.S.
- Batted: Left Threw: Left

MLB debut
- June 13, 1961, for the San Francisco Giants

Last MLB appearance
- July 28, 1963, for the Chicago Cubs

MLB statistics
- Win–loss record: 3–8
- Earned run average: 4.17
- Strikeouts: 69
- Innings pitched: 108
- Stats at Baseball Reference

Teams
- San Francisco Giants (1961–1962); Chicago Cubs (1963)

Richard Paul LeMay (August 28, 1938 – March 19, 2018) was an American professional baseball player. A left-handed pitcher, LeMay appeared in parts of three Major League Baseball seasons (1961–63), but had a long career in minor league baseball. He was born in Cincinnati, Ohio, and graduated from Withrow High School.

LeMay attended the University of Michigan, stood 6 feet 3 inches (1.91 m) tall and weighed 190 pounds (86 kg). He signed with the San Francisco Giants in 1958 and was recalled from the minor leagues during the 1961 season, appearing in 27 games for the Giants that season, starting five. He dropped six of nine decisions and recorded an earned run average of 3.56 and one complete game in 83 1/3 innings pitched. He had nine-game trials with the 1962 Giants and the 1963 Chicago Cubs, and was winless in two decisions. All told he won three games, lost eight and had a career ERA of 4.17 in 45 Major League games. In 108 innings pitched, he surrendered 100 hits and 49 bases on balls. He struck out 69, and was credited with four saves. In his lone MLB complete game, on June 24, 1961, at Busch Stadium, he defeated the St. Louis Cardinals, 6–1, allowing six hits; future Baseball Hall of Famer Bob Gibson took the loss.

After he returned to minor league baseball in 1963, LeMay had a successful career as a starting pitcher at the Triple-A level through 1970, reaching the double digits in wins for six consecutive seasons, including 17- and 16-victory seasons in 1965 and 1968. All told, he won 139 games and lost 124 as a minor league pitcher. LeMay also managed at the Class A level in the Cubs' farm system in 1971–72 and was a scout for the Philadelphia Phillies in the 1970s and the Montreal Expos during the 1980s.

LeMay died on March 19, 2018.
