= Jim Davenport =

American baseball player (1933-2016)

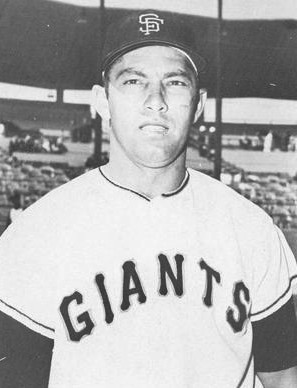
- Third baseman / Manager
- Born: August 17, 1933; Siluria, Alabama, U.S.
- Died: February 18, 2016 (aged 82); Redwood City, California, U.S.
- Batted: Right Threw: Right

MLB debut
- April 15, 1958, for the San Francisco Giants

Last MLB appearance
- June 23, 1970, for the San Francisco Giants

MLB statistics
- Batting average: .258
- Home runs: 77
- Runs batted in: 456
- Managerial record: 56–86
- Winning %: .388
- Stats at Baseball Reference

Teams
- As player: San Francisco Giants (1958–1970); As manager: San Francisco Giants (1985); As coach: San Francisco Giants (1970); San Diego Padres (1974–1975); San Francisco Giants (1976–1982); Philadelphia Phillies (1986–1987); Cleveland Indians (1989); Detroit Tigers (1991); San Francisco Giants (1996)

Career highlights and awards
- 2× All-Star (1962, 1962^{2}); Gold Glove Award (1962); San Francisco Giants Wall of Fame

James Houston Davenport (August 17, 1933 – February 18, 2016) was an American professional baseball infielder and coach who played his entire career with the San Francisco Giants in Major League Baseball (MLB). He also managed the Giants for one season in 1985 and served as a coach in various capacities for nine years over three different terms, spending a total of 51 years with the organization. The right-handed batter and thrower, nicknamed "Peanut" or "Peanuts" as a child by his grandfather, was listed as 5 feet 11 inches (1.80 m) tall and 170 pounds (77 kg).

== Early life ==
Davenport was born and grew up in Siluria, Alabama, also the birthplace of future teammate Willie Kirkland, and not far from Willie Mays' hometown. Growing up, Davenport had wanted to play football for the University of Alabama. However, Davenport married after high school and Alabama had a policy of not recruiting married players.

== College career ==
Instead, he earned a football scholarship to the University of Southern Mississippi (then called Mississippi Southern College), where he played quarterback and also joined the baseball team. In 1954, Davenport hit .439 for the Southern Miss baseball team, and signed a professional contract with the Giants after the season.

== Professional career ==
=== San Francisco Giants (1958–1970) ===
Davenport made his major league debut with the San Francisco Giants on April 15, 1958, taking the team's first at bat on the West Coast, striking out against Don Drysdale of the Los Angeles Dodgers at Seals Stadium. His best season was 1962, when he batted .297 with 14 home runs and 58 RBIs and made the All-Star team for the only time in his career. In the first of 1962's two MLB All-Star games, played July 10 at DC Stadium, Davenport took over for Ken Boyer as the National League's third baseman in the sixth inning with the Senior Circuit ahead, 2–1. In the eighth frame, his single off Dick Donovan set up Maury Wills' insurance run, as the Nationals ultimately won 3–1. Davenport played errorless ball in the field over the game's last four innings.

That same season, Davenport was critical to the Giants' winning their first pennant since moving to San Francisco five years before. After going four for nine (.444) in the first two games of the 1962 National League tie-breaker series against the Dodgers, including a home run off Sandy Koufax in Game 1, Davenport drew a bases-loaded walk off Stan Williams in the ninth inning of the decisive Game 3 to get credit for the game-winning RBI in the Giants' eventual 6–4 victory, which gained them their first NL title since 1954, when they played in New York City. In the 1962 World Series that followed, he started all seven games against the New York Yankees, but could muster only three hits in 22 at bats (.136), although he drew four more bases on balls. Defensively, he made three errors in 21 total chances at third base. The Giants lost the Series in seven games.

However, Davenport was known for his fielding, leading National League third basemen in fielding percentage each season from 1959 to 1961 and winning a Gold Glove at third base in 1962. Davenport played 97 consecutive errorless games at third base from July 26, 1966, to April 28, 1968, a record that stood until it was broken by John Wehner in the 1990s.

He had a career batting average of .258 with 77 home runs and 456 RBIs, with 1,142 career hits, also including 177 doubles and 37 triples, in 4,427 at bats. He played in 1,501 regular-season games in 13 years, the fourth-most in San Francisco Giants history after Willie McCovey (2,256), Willie Mays (2,095) and Barry Bonds (1,976). His 1,130 games played at third base are the most in Giants' history.

== Post-playing career ==
After retiring as a player, Davenport finished the 1970 season as a coach on the staff of manager Charlie Fox. He managed the Triple-A Phoenix Giants for three years (1971–1973), then came back to MLB with the San Diego Padres for two years (1974–1975), working as third-base coach for skipper John McNamara. He returned to the Giants as their third base coach from 1976 to 1982, then as a scout.

Davenport was promoted to manager of the Giants in 1985, but was replaced September 17 by Roger Craig after compiling a 56–88 record; the club was in last place in the National League West Division, 29 games behind the Dodgers at the time. The 1985 team went on to lose 100 games in the worst season in franchise history (to date, it is also the only time the team has ever hit the triple-digit mark in losses). He moved on to work as a coach for the Philadelphia Phillies (1986–1987), Cleveland Indians (1989) and Detroit Tigers (1991), and was the Tigers' advance scout in 1992. He returned to the Giants for good in 1993, and served as the club's first base coach in 1996. Overall, Davenport worked in the Giants' organization for 51 years in various roles, including player, coach, scout, manager, and a minor-league instructor.

In 2001, Davenport was named manager of the Italy national baseball team; he led the team to third place finishes at the World Port Tournament (behind Cuba and the Netherlands) and at the 2001 European Baseball Championship in Germany. It was the first time since 1957 Italy finished outside the top two. He also led Italy at the 2001 Baseball World Cup in Taiwan.

Davenport was inducted into the Southern Miss Athletic Hall of Fame as a quarterback in 1968. He was inducted into the Mississippi Sports Hall of Fame in 1983. In 2006, Davenport was inducted into the Alabama Sports Hall of Fame.

== Personal life ==
He married his high school sweetheart, Betty, and had five children, a daughter and four sons. His son Gary Davenport played minor league baseball in the Giants organization and has coached in the Giants' minor league system since 2004. Davenport lived in San Carlos, California and worked in the Giants' front office until his death on February 18, 2016. He is buried in Skylawn Memorial Park near San Francisco. The Giants wore a patch in his memory for the 2016 season, a black circle with an orange outline and his nickname "Davvy" and his number 12, to be worn on the left sleeve, below Monte Irvin's memorial patch.

== See also ==
- List of Major League Baseball players who spent their entire career with one franchise
