= José Pagán =

Puerto Rican baseball player (1935–2011)

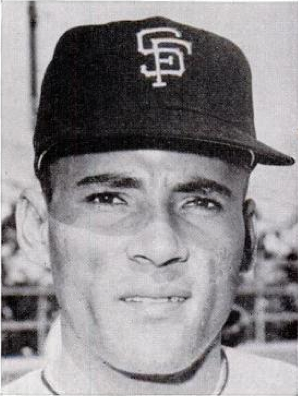
- Pagán in 1963
- Shortstop / Third baseman
- Born: May 5, 1935; Barceloneta, Puerto Rico
- Died: June 7, 2011 (aged 76); Sebring, Florida, U.S.
- Batted: Right Threw: Right

MLB debut
- August 4, 1959, for the San Francisco Giants

Last MLB appearance
- August 15, 1973, for the Philadelphia Phillies

MLB statistics
- Batting average: .250
- Home runs: 52
- Runs batted in: 372
- Stats at Baseball Reference

Teams
- As player: San Francisco Giants (1959–1965); Pittsburgh Pirates (1965–1972); Philadelphia Phillies (1973); As coach: Pittsburgh Pirates (1974–1978)

Career highlights and awards
- World Series champion (1971)

José Pagán (May 5, 1935 – June 7, 2011) was a Puerto Rican professional baseball player and coach. He played in Major League Baseball (MLB) as an infielder and outfielder for fifteen seasons, with three National League (NL) teams from 1959 to 1973. Pagán was notable for driving in the winning run for the Pittsburgh Pirates in the seventh game of the 1971 World Series.

== Baseball career ==
Pagán (birth name: José Antonio Pagán Rodríguez) was born in the town of Barceloneta, Puerto Rico. He made his major league debut at the age of 24 with the San Francisco Giants on August 8, 1959. Pagán's best full season statistically came with the Giants in 1962, when he hit .259 and drove in a career high 57 runs. He had 73 runs scored that year, which also was a career high, while collecting 150 hits for the only time in his career as the Giants won the National League Pennant. Pagán hit .368 with a home run in the 1962 World Series as the Giants lost to the New York Yankees in seven-games.

On May 22, 1965 the San Francisco Giants traded Pagán to the Pittsburgh Pirates for Dick Schofield. As a member of the Pirates he won three consecutive National League Eastern Division titles between 1970 and 1972. Despite playing part-time for the Pirates from 1966–1970, Pagán batted in the .260s twice and the .280s twice out of those five years, only hitting under .264 in 1968 when he only had 163 at bats. During that time instead of playing shortstop, he played mostly third base and left field, but also was used as a key "spare part" for the team, playing games at every position in the infield, even one at catcher in 1967 for one inning.

=== World Series hero ===
With the Pirates in 1971, after losing the NLCS in 1970, he won his only World Series and became a hero of the deciding game. In game seven of the 1971 World Series between the Pirates and the Baltimore Orioles, Pagán hit a double in the top of the eighth inning which scored Willie Stargell which proved to be the game's (and series') winning run.

He was released by the Pittsburgh Pirates on October 24, 1972 and, signed as a free agent with the Philadelphia Phillies on November 13, 1972. He played his final major league game on August 15, 1973 at the age of 38 with the Phillies.

=== Coaching ===
After his playing career ended, Pagán was a Pittsburgh Pirates coach for five seasons (1974–1978). He managed the Triple-A Ogden A's in the Pacific Coast League for two seasons (1979–1980) and teams in the Puerto Rican Winter League for several seasons, and lived in Puerto Rico before moving his family to Florida in 1999.

== Death ==
Pagán died at age 76 in 2011 at his home in Sebring, Florida, a victim of Alzheimer's disease, and was survived by his wife and two sons. He was held in such esteem by the Pittsburgh organization that a moment of silence was observed before the Pirates game with the Arizona Diamondbacks at PNC Park that night. He was buried at Lakeview Memorial Gardens in Avon Park.

== See also ==
- List of Puerto Ricans
- Sports in Puerto Rico

Pagan was coach with Philadelphia, not Pittsburgh, after retiring as player. ==Notes==
