= Marshall Bridges =

American baseball player (1931–1990)

- Pitcher
- Born: June 2, 1931; Jackson, Mississippi, U.S.
- Died: September 3, 1990 (aged 59); Jackson, Mississippi, U.S.
- Batted: Switch Threw: Left

MLB debut
- June 17, 1959, for the St. Louis Cardinals

Last MLB appearance
- September 25, 1965, for the Washington Senators

MLB statistics
- Win–loss record: 23–15
- Earned run average: 3.75
- Strikeouts: 302
- Saves: 25
- Stats at Baseball Reference

Teams
- St. Louis Cardinals (1959–1960); Cincinnati Reds (1960–1961); New York Yankees (1962–1963); Washington Senators (1964–1965)

Career highlights and awards
- World Series champion (1962)

Marshall Bridges (June 2, 1931 – September 3, 1990) was an American baseball pitcher who played in the Major Leagues from 1959 to 1965 for the St. Louis Cardinals, Cincinnati Reds, New York Yankees and Washington Senators.

A strong left-handed pitcher with an excellent fastball, Bridges was listed as 6 feet 1 inch (1.85 m) tall and 165 pounds (75 kg). After spending time with the Negro league Memphis Red Sox, then bouncing around the minor leagues for six seasons, he broke into the majors with St. Louis in the mid-season of 1959, posting a 6–3 won-lost record and a 4.26 earned run average, striking out 76 hitters in 76 innings. He might have pitched more in his first couple seasons, but sore heels gave him trouble. Used almost exclusively as a relief pitcher throughout his seven-season career, Bridges' best season came in 1962 while a member of the Yankees, anchoring the world champions' relief staff while recording a team-leading 18 saves to go with an 8–4 record and a 3.14 earned run average. However, that same season he also became the first American League pitcher to give up a World Series grand slam home run when Chuck Hiller of the San Francisco Giants got hold of one in Game 4.

One of the era's most colorful characters, Bridges was nicknamed "Sheriff" and "Fox." He was known as a teller of tall tales and an instigator or victim of elaborate practical jokes. During 1963 spring training in a Fort Lauderdale, Florida, bar, a disagreement between Bridges and a female patron resulted in her shooting him in the leg. The resulting negative publicity annoyed the image-conscious Yankee brass and may have been a major factor in them selling his contract to last-place Washington on November 30, 1963. His recovery from the gunshot wound was apparently complete, but Bridges never regained the dominance that he had shown in 1962.

The 1965 Senators were Bridges' last stop in his MLB career. His lifetime totals include a won/lost record of 23–15, 25 saves, an ERA of 3.75 and 302 strikeouts in 3451/3 innings pitched.

Bridges died of cancer on September 3, 1990, at the age of 59 at the University of Mississippi Medical Center in Jackson.
