= Billy O'Dell =

American baseball player (1933–2018)

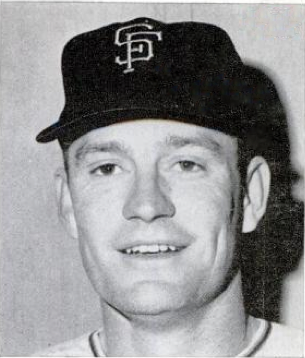
- O'Dell in 1963
- Pitcher
- Born: February 10, 1933; Whitmire, South Carolina, U.S.
- Died: September 12, 2018 (aged 85); Newberry, South Carolina, U.S.
- Batted: Switch Threw: Left

MLB debut
- June 20, 1954, for the Baltimore Orioles

Last MLB appearance
- September 12, 1967, for the Pittsburgh Pirates

MLB statistics
- Win–loss record: 105–100
- Earned run average: 3.29
- Strikeouts: 1,133
- Stats at Baseball Reference

Teams
- Baltimore Orioles (1954, 1956–1959); San Francisco Giants (1960–1964); Milwaukee / Atlanta Braves (1965–1966); Pittsburgh Pirates (1966–1967)

Career highlights and awards
- 2× All-Star (1958, 1959²)

William Oliver O'Dell (February 10, 1933 – September 12, 2018), known as Billy O'Dell and also as Digger O'Dell, was an American professional baseball player who pitched in the Major Leagues in thirteen seasons: 1954 and from 1956 to 1967. He was signed by the Baltimore Orioles as an amateur free agent in 1954, and was a bonus baby, never spending a day in the minors. He did not play in 1955 due to service in the military.

== Early life ==
O'Dell was born on February 10, 1932, in Whitmire, South Carolina, to Hattie O’Dell Ferguson and Edgar Setzler "Boggie” O’Dell. O'Dell attended Newberry High School (and/or Whitmire High School) where he was a pitcher on its baseball team under coach Harry Hedgepath. O'Dell also pitched for various local textile league teams.

O'Dell attended Clemson University, and played on its baseball team from 1952 to 1954. He was the team's best pitcher in 1954 with a 0.79 earned run average (ERA), still a school record for starting Clemson pitchers. O'Dell was named first-team All-Atlantic Coast Conference (ACC) and second-team All-American, and led the 1954 team to its first ACC championship. He pitched a no-hitter in 1954 against the University of South Carolina.

Over his Clemson career, O'Dell had a 1.51 ERA and 300 strikeouts, averaging 12.3 strikeouts per nine innings. He was all-Southern Conference in 1952 and 1953. He also played football for three years at Clemson. In 1973, O'Dell was inducted into the Clemson Athletic Hall of Fame's inaugural class.

== Professional baseball career ==
=== Baltimore Orioles ===
In 1954, the Orioles signed O'Dell out of Clemson as the team's first "bonus baby". He pitched in his first game for the Orioles less than a month after his last game at Clemson, and never spent one day in the minor leagues during his professional career.

Bonus babies were major league baseball players signed between 1947 and 1965, receiving more than $4,000, who went to play directly for their major league team for at least two years without playing in the minor leagues first. 1954 was also the team's first year in Baltimore, after having been the St. Louis Browns from 1902 to 1953.

O'Dell pitched in seven games for the Orioles in 1954, did not play in 1955 while serving in the military, and played in four games in 1956. His first full year with the Orioles came in 1957, and he played with the team two more years. Over his Orioles career, O'Dell had 29–34 record with a 2.86 ERA, and he never had an ERA above 2.97. During his years with the Orioles the team struggled, with only one year where it reached a .500 record, and never finishing above fifth place in the American League. During his first all-star season in 1958, O'Dell had a 14-11 won-loss record, although the team finished in sixth place, out of eight teams (with a 74–79 record).

O'Dell was an All-Star representative for the American League in 1958 and 1959. The 1958 game was in Baltimore. O'Dell came into the game at the start of the seventh inning, with a 4–3 lead. He got the final nine straight batters out, without a hit, to save the American League's win. Included in the nine were future Hall of Fame players Willie Mays, Stan Musial, Hank Aaron, Ernie Banks and Bill Mazeroski. O'Dell was selected as the game's Most Valuable Player.

In 1959, O'dell had the highest strikeout to walk ratio in all of MLB with 2.69. On May 19, 1959, O'Dell hit a 120-foot inside-the-park home run for the Orioles in a 2–1 victory over the Chicago White Sox. On November 30, 1959, the Orioles traded him, along with Billy Loes, to the San Francisco Giants for Jackie Brandt, Gordon Jones and Roger McCardell.

During his time with the Orioles, O'Dell's roommate was future Hall of Fame third baseman Brooks Robinson. Robinson has described O'Dell's pitching style as crafty, rather than overpowering; and O'Dell's nature as easygoing and even keeled, no matter the situation.

=== Giants, Braves and Pirates ===
On July 4, 1961, in the first game of a doubleheader, O'Dell came on in relief of Eddie Fisher, who allowed the first three Chicago Cubs he faced to reach base on hits in the bottom of the first inning, tying the game 2-2. O'Dell proceeded to retire the next 26 of the 29 batters he faced. O'Dell allowed just one run and two hits in nine innings and struck out a career high 13 batters in a relief role, recording the win. The Giants routed the Cubs, 19–3, at Wrigley Field.

In 1962, O'Dell won a career high 19 games for the NL champion Giants. O'Dell was the losing pitcher in Game 1 of the 1962 World Series against the New York Yankees. He gave up a two-run double to Roger Maris, an RBI single to Tony Kubek, a solo home run to Clete Boyer, and finally an RBI single to Dale Long before being relieved by manager Alvin Dark for veteran pitcher Don Larsen, thus allowing five earned runs in 7 1/3 innings. He did strike out eight, including Hall of Famer Mickey Mantle, who struck out twice.

After 1963, O'Dell was primarily a relief pitcher. On July 23, 1964, O'Dell allowed 12 runs (11 earned) in seven innings in a 13–4 loss to the Cubs. Alvin Dark, the Giants manager, was criticized for leaving O'Dell in so long, but Dark later explained that he thought O'Dell needed to get more work in. O'Dell had not been pitching deep in games that year, and his elbow was getting sore from disuse. While O'Dell's ERA was lower after that game, he only made one further start, working mainly out of the bullpen for the rest of the year.

After the 1964 season, the Giants traded O'Dell to the Milwaukee Braves for Ed Bailey. In 1965, he pitched in 62 games for the Braves, starting only one game, with a 2.18 ERA and 19 saves. He was with the Braves when they moved to Atlanta in 1966. He was traded by Atlanta to the Pittsburgh Pirates for Don Schwall in June 1966. At the time of the trade, he had a 2.40 ERA and six saves for the Braves. In 1966 with the Pirates, he had a 2.78 ERA, with a 3–2 record and four saves. In 1967, his final year, O'Dell pitched in only 27 games. O'Dell's final game was on September 12, 1967, in relief for the Pirates against the Cincinnati Reds. He was released by the Pirates at the end of the 1967 season.

Over his career, O'Dell had a 3.29 ERA, a 105–100 record, and 50 saves.

== Honors ==
He was inducted into the South Carolina Athletic Hall of Fame in 1976.

== Personal life ==
After retiring, O'Dell once ran for political office. In 1968, he went to work for a textile company in his hometown as a public relations director. He also coached American Legion baseball.

== Death ==
He died at a hospital in Newberry, South Carolina on September 12, 2018, from complications of Parkinson's disease, aged 85.
