= Jack Sanford =

American baseball player (1929–2000)

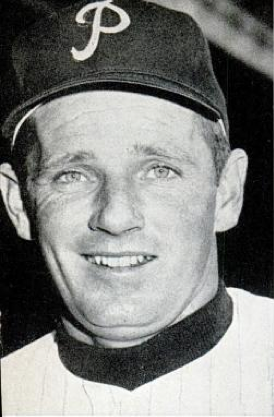
- Sanford in 1958
- Pitcher
- Born: May 18, 1929; Wellesley Hills, Massachusetts, U.S.
- Died: March 7, 2000 (aged 70); Beckley, West Virginia, U.S.
- Batted: Right Threw: Right

MLB debut
- September 16, 1956, for the Philadelphia Phillies

Last MLB appearance
- August 6, 1967, for the Kansas City Athletics

MLB statistics
- Win–loss record: 137–101
- Earned run average: 3.69
- Strikeouts: 1,182
- Stats at Baseball Reference

Teams
- Philadelphia Phillies (1956–1958); San Francisco Giants (1959–1965); California Angels (1965–1967); Kansas City Athletics (1967)

Career highlights and awards
- All-Star (1957); NL Rookie of the Year (1957); NL strikeout leader (1957)

John Stanley Sanford (May 18, 1929 – March 7, 2000) was an American professional baseball pitcher who played 12 seasons in Major League Baseball (MLB). Sanford was notable for the meteoric start to his career when, he led the National League with 188 strikeouts as a 28-year-old rookie for the Philadelphia Phillies in 1957. He later became a 20-game-winner and made his only World Series appearance as a member of the San Francisco Giants. He also played for the California Angels and the Kansas City Athletics.

== Baseball career ==
Sanford was born in Wellesley Hills, Massachusetts. After playing in the minor leagues for seven seasons, he made his major league debut with the Phillies on September 16, 1956, at the age of 27. Sanford made an immediate impact the following season when, he began the year with a 10–2 win–loss record to earn a spot on the National League team in the 1957 All-Star Game on July 9, 1957. He ended the season with a 19–8 win–loss record and a 3.08 earned run average along with a league-leading 188 strikeouts. His 19 victories were second only to the 21 wins by Warren Spahn. He also had 15 complete games on the season, including three shutouts. For his impressive performance, he was named the National League Rookie of the Year in 1957.

His next seven years would be extremely solid, but never quite as impressive as his rookie season; or according to some, he never improved much after it. After being traded to the Giants for the 1959 season, Sanford went 15–12 with a 3.16 ERA in 222 1/3 innings pitched and completed 10 games. That year, he started 31 games and made 36 appearances, 5 out of the bullpen.

Sanford led the Giants to the 1962 National League pennant with 24 victories, second only to the 25 victories by Don Drysdale. He won 16 consecutive decisions from mid-June to mid-September and was named Player of the Month in August for his second straight 6-0 month (he also posted a 3.55 ERA, and 31 SO). Only Rube Marquard, who won 19 straight games for the 1912 New York Giants, and Roy Face, who won 17 straight for the 1959 Pittsburgh Pirates have won more consecutive games in a single season during the modern era. Six pitchers have matched Sanford's 16-game streak.

The Giants would face the New York Yankees in the World Series in the only post-season appearance of Sanford's career. Sanford made three starts for the club in the World Series. In Game 2, he pitched a three-hit shutout as the Giants beat the Yankees 2–0. He was supposed to start Game 5 October 9, but rain pushed it back a day, which bothered Sanford, who had psyched himself to pitch that day. Sanford gave up a three-run home run to Tom Tresh and a total of five runs (four earned) in 7 1/3 innings as the Giants lost 5–3. He pitched better in Game 7, allowing just one run in seven innings against the Yankees when Bill Skowron scored as Tony Kubek hit into a double play in the fifth inning. That run was enough, though, for the Yankees to win 1–0, behind a Ralph Terry shutout. Sanford finished second to Don Drysdale in the voting for the 1962 Cy Young Award. After he left the Giants, his best seasons were behind him. He ended his playing career with the Kansas City Athletics on August 6, 1967 at the age of 38.

However, Sanford remained in the major leagues for two more seasons as the pitching coach of the 1968–1969 Cleveland Indians. Working on the staff of Alvin Dark, his manager with the 1962 Giants and 1967 Athletics, Sanford's first season saw the 1968 Indians compile a staff earned run average of 2.66. Throughout baseball, 1968 was known as "The Year of the Pitcher", and two of Cleveland's starters, Luis Tiant (1.60 in 2581/3 innings pitched) and Sam McDowell (1.81 in 269 innings), finished first and second in ERA in the American League.

== Pitching style ==
Sanford's best pitch was his fastball. When he was with the Giants in 1961, Dark and Larry Jansen had him practice throwing a curveball or slider on the first pitch to every batter. This was because Dark believed that it was better to be able to throw a pitch that might not be a pitcher's best if a hitter was particularly good at hitting a pitcher's best pitch.

== Career statistics ==
In a twelve-year major league career, Sanford played in 388 games, accumulating a 137-101 win–loss record along with a 3.69 earned run average in 2,049 1/3 innings pitched. He accumulated 1,182 strikeouts and gave up only 840 earned runs. He also finished in the Top 10 in MVP Award voting twice in his career (1957, 1962). He finished second in the league in wins twice, losing in 1957 to only Warren Spahn and in 1962 to Cy Young Award winner Don Drysdale.

== Later life ==
After retiring from baseball, Sanford was a golf director at country clubs. Sanford died of a brain tumor at age 70 in Beckley, West Virginia.

== Highlights ==
- Rookie of the Year in 1957
- Led the league in strikeouts in 1957 (188)
- National League All-Star in 1957
- Led the league in shutouts in 1960 (6)
- 2nd in Cy Young Award voting in 1962 to Don Drysdale

== See also ==
- List of Major League Baseball annual strikeout leaders

Preceded by Frank Howard	Major League Player of the Month; August, 1962	Succeeded by Dick Ellsworth
Preceded by Clay Bryant	Cleveland Indians pitching coach 1968–1969	Succeeded by Cot Deal
