= 1962 World Series =

59th edition of Major League Baseball's championship series

Team (Wins)	Managers	Season
New York Yankees (4)	Ralph Houk	96–66, .593, GA: 5
San Francisco Giants (3)	Alvin Dark	103–62, .624, GA: 1
- Dates: October 4–16
- Venue(s): Candlestick Park (San Francisco); Yankee Stadium (New York)
- MVP: Ralph Terry (New York)
- Umpires: Al Barlick (NL), Charlie Berry (AL), Stan Landes (NL), Jim Honochick (AL), Ken Burkhart (NL: outfield only), Hank Soar (AL: outfield only)
- Hall of Famers: Umpire: Al Barlick; Yankees: Yogi Berra; Whitey Ford; Mickey Mantle; Giants: Orlando Cepeda; Juan Marichal; Willie Mays; Willie McCovey; Gaylord Perry

Broadcast
- Television: NBC
- TV announcers: Russ Hodges and Mel Allen
- Radio: NBC
- Radio announcers: George Kell and Joe Garagiola

The 1962 World Series was the championship series of Major League Baseball's (MLB) 1962 season. The 59th edition of the World Series, it was a best-of-seven playoff that matched the defending American League (AL) and World Series champion New York Yankees against the National League (NL) champion San Francisco Giants. The Yankees won the series in seven games for the 20th championship in team history. It is best remembered for its dramatic conclusion in Game 7; with runners on second and third base and two outs in the bottom of the ninth inning, the Giants’ Willie McCovey hit a hard line drive that was caught by Yankees second baseman Bobby Richardson to preserve New York's one-run victory. Yankees pitcher Ralph Terry was named the World Series Most Valuable Player.

The Giants had won their first NL pennant since 1954 and first since moving from New York in 1958. They advanced by defeating the Los Angeles Dodgers in a three-game playoff. The Giants had a higher cumulative batting average (.226 to .199) and lower earned run average (2.66 to 2.95), had more hits (51 to 44), runs (21 to 20), hit more home runs (5 to 3), triples (2 to 1) and doubles (10 to 6), yet lost the Series. They would not return to the World Series for another 27 years.

The Yankees had won their first World Series in 1923; of the 40 Series played between 1923 and 1962, the Yankees won half. After a long dominance of the World Series picture, the Yankees would not win another World Series for 15 years despite appearances in 1963, 1964, and 1976.

This World Series, which was closely matched in every game, is also remembered for its then-record length of 13 days, caused by postponements due to rain in both cities.

== Summary ==
AL New York Yankees (4) vs. NL San Francisco Giants (3)

Game	Date	Score	Location	Time	Attendance
1	October 4	New York Yankees – 6, San Francisco Giants – 2	Candlestick Park	2:43	43,852
2	October 5	New York Yankees – 0, San Francisco Giants – 2	Candlestick Park	2:11	43,910
3	October 7	San Francisco Giants – 2, New York Yankees – 3	Yankee Stadium	2:06	71,434
4	October 8	San Francisco Giants – 7, New York Yankees – 3	Yankee Stadium	2:55	66,607
5	October 10†	San Francisco Giants – 3, New York Yankees – 5	Yankee Stadium	2:42	63,165
6	October 15††	New York Yankees – 2, San Francisco Giants – 5	Candlestick Park	2:00	43,948
7	October 16	New York Yankees – 1, San Francisco Giants – 0	Candlestick Park	2:29	43,948

NOTE: the series was originally scheduled to begin October 3, but was moved back one day due to the three-game playoff between the Giants and Dodgers to determine the National League pennant.
†: postponed from October 9 due to rain
††: postponed from October 11 due to rain

== Matchups ==
=== Game 1 ===
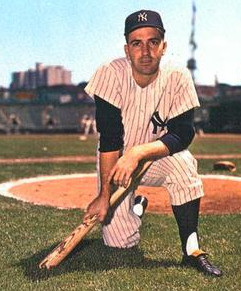
Clete Boyer

Thursday, October 4, 1962 12:00 pm (PT) at Candlestick Park in San Francisco, California
Team	1	2	3	4	5	6	7	8	9	R	H	E
New York	2	0	0	0	0	0	1	2	1	6	11	0
San Francisco	0	1	1	0	0	0	0	0	0	2	10	0
WP: Whitey Ford (1–0) LP: Billy O'Dell (0–1); Home runs: NYY: Clete Boyer (1); SF: None

Roger Maris' two-run double in the first inning off Billy O'Dell set up Yankee starter Whitey Ford with a lead, but Willie Mays scored for the Giants on Jose Pagan's single in the second, ending Ford's record World Series consecutive scoreless inning streak at 33 2/3. Chuck Hiller's double and Felipe Alou's single in the third tied the game, but the Yankees broke the tie in the seventh on Clete Boyer's home run. Next inning, Dale Long followed a single and hit-by-pitch with an RBI single to make it 4–2 Yankees and knock O'Dell out of the game. Boyer's sacrifice fly off Don Larsen extended their lead to 5–2. The Yankees got a final run in the ninth on Elston Howard's RBI single off Stu Miller, the run charged to Larsen. Ford's complete-game victory was the first of six in the series, four for the Yankees and two for the Giants.

=== Game 2 ===
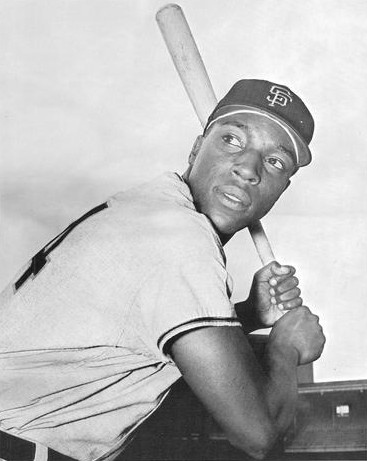
Willie McCovey

Friday, October 5, 1962 12:00 pm (PT) at Candlestick Park in San Francisco, California
Team	1	2	3	4	5	6	7	8	9	R	H	E
New York	0	0	0	0	0	0	0	0	0	0	3	1
San Francisco	1	0	0	0	0	0	1	0	X	2	6	0
WP: Jack Sanford (1–0) LP: Ralph Terry (0–1); Home runs: NYY: None; SF: Willie McCovey (1)

The Giants scored two runs in Game 2, in the first when Chuck Hiller hit a leadoff double off Ralph Terry and scored on two ground outs, then in the seventh when Willie McCovey smashed a tremendous home run over the right-field fence to boost 24-game winner Jack Sanford to a 2–0 shutout of the Yankees, who managed only three hits.

=== Game 3 ===
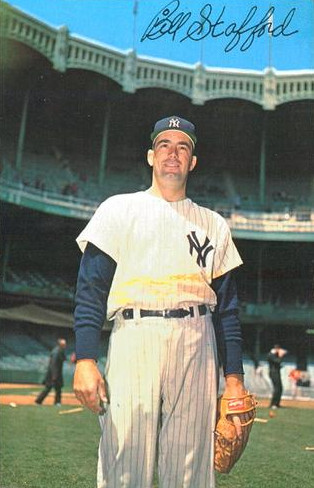
Bill Stafford

Sunday, October 7, 1962 2:00 pm (ET) at Yankee Stadium in Bronx, New York
Team	1	2	3	4	5	6	7	8	9	R	H	E
San Francisco	0	0	0	0	0	0	0	0	2	2	4	3
New York	0	0	0	0	0	0	3	0	X	3	5	1
WP: Bill Stafford (1–0) LP: Billy Pierce (0–1); Home runs: SF: Ed Bailey (1); NYY: None

The Yankees ended a scoreless tie in the seventh with three runs. After two leadoff singles, Roger Maris drove a base hit off starter Billy Pierce for two runs, then after moving to third on a sacrifice fly, he scored the eventual winning run on Clete Boyer's groundout off Don Larsen when the Giants were unable to turn an inning-ending double play. Giants catcher Ed Bailey's two-run home run in the top of the ninth off Bill Stafford left them a run short.

=== Game 4 ===
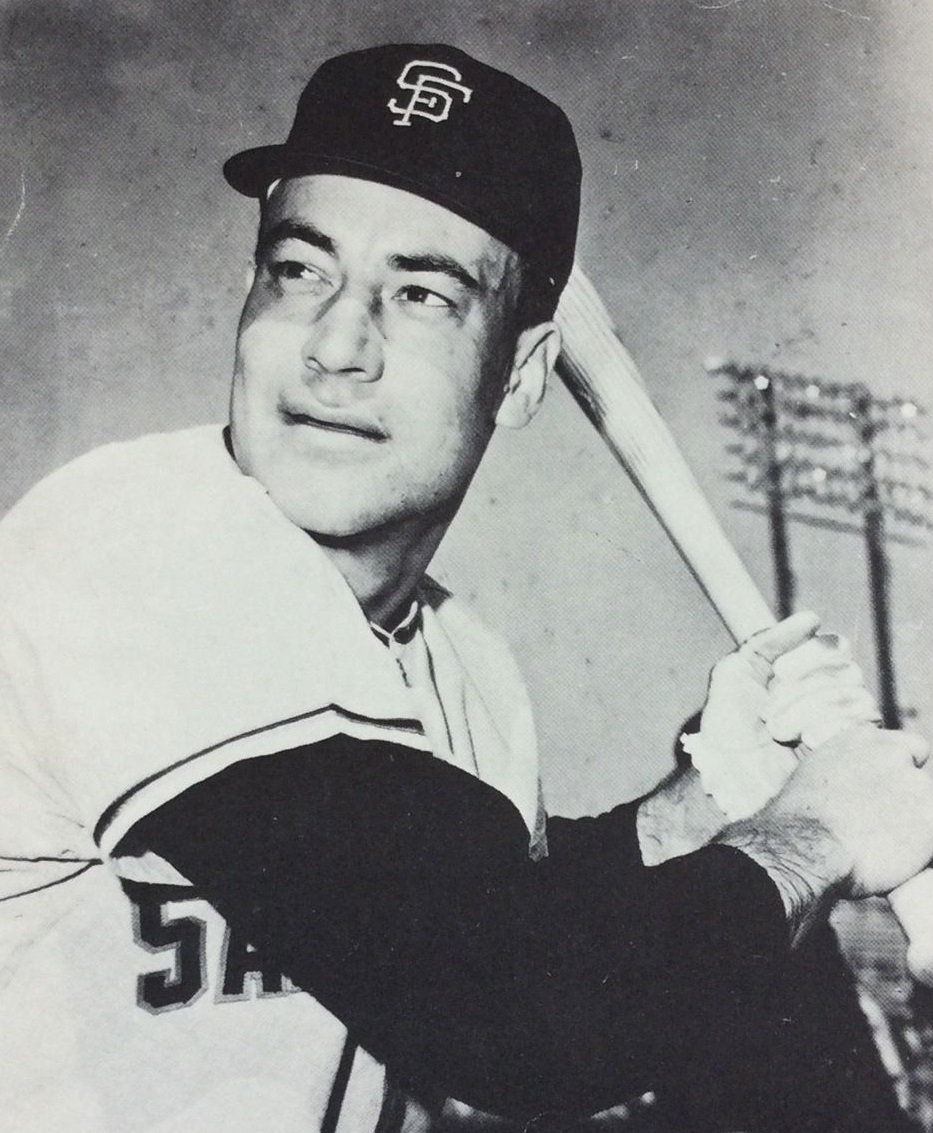
Chuck Hiller

Monday, October 8, 1962 1:00 pm (ET) at Yankee Stadium in Bronx, New York
Team	1	2	3	4	5	6	7	8	9	R	H	E
San Francisco	0	2	0	0	0	0	4	0	1	7	9	1
New York	0	0	0	0	0	2	0	0	1	3	9	1
WP: Don Larsen (1–0) LP: Jim Coates (0–1) Sv: Billy O'Dell (1); Home runs: SF: Tom Haller (1), Chuck Hiller (1); NYY: None

For the second time in as many games, a Giants catcher stroked a two-run home run, when Tom Haller hit one off Whitey Ford in the second inning. After the Yankees tied the score at 2–2 in the sixth on back-to-back walks off reliever Bobby Bolin followed by back-to-back RBI singles by Bill Skowron and Clete Boyer, second baseman Chuck Hiller hit the first National League grand slam in World Series history in the seventh off Marshall Bridges with two of the runs charged to reliever Jim Coates. The Giants scored another run in the ninth off Bridges when Matty Alou hit a leadoff single, moved to second on a sacrifice bunt, and scored on Chuck Hiller's single. The Yankees got that run back on three straight two-out singles off Billy O'Dell, the last an RBI single by Tom Tresh, but Mickey Mantle hit into a forceout to end the game as the Giants won 7–3. This game marked the only World Series appearance for Juan Marichal, who started for the Giants. Marichal smashed the thumb on his pitching hand while attempting to bunt in the top of the fifth, and was placed on the disabled list for the remainder of the series.

Don Larsen was the winning pitcher in relief, six years to the day after (and in the same stadium of) his perfect game in the 1956 World Series.

The Giants' win tied the series at two games apiece and guaranteed a return trip to San Francisco.

=== Game 5 ===
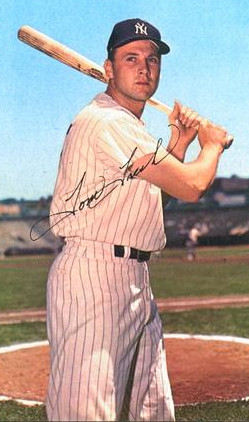
Tom Tresh

Wednesday, October 10, 1962 1:00 pm (ET) at Yankee Stadium in Bronx, New York
Team	1	2	3	4	5	6	7	8	9	R	H	E
San Francisco	0	0	1	0	1	0	0	0	1	3	8	2
New York	0	0	0	1	0	1	0	3	X	5	6	0
WP: Ralph Terry (1–1) LP: Jack Sanford (1–1); Home runs: SF: José Pagán (1); NYY: Tom Tresh (1)

Games 5 and 6 were postponed by rain. Game 5 at New York was pushed back one day, but Game 6 in San Francisco was pushed back four days due to torrential rain on the West Coast. Three of the longest World Series in terms of total days, due to various postponements, involved the Giants: the 1911 and the 1989 were the other two.

In Game 5, hot-hitting José Pagán hit a leadoff single in the third off Ralph Terry, moved to second on a sacrifice bunt, then scored on Chuck Hiller's RBI single. After a wild pitch from Jack Sanford tied the game in the fourth, Pagan's home run in the fifth put the Giants back in front 2–1, but another wild pitch in the sixth by Sanford tied the game again. In the eighth, Bobby Richardson and Tony Kubek hit back-to-back singles before Tom Tresh hit the game-winning three-run home run. The Giants scored a run in the ninth when Willie McCovey hit a leadoff single and scored on Tom Haller's one-out double, but Terry retired the next two hitters to end the game. With the series returning to San Francisco the Yankees had the edge, three games to two, only to have the sixth game delayed four days by rain.

=== Game 6 ===
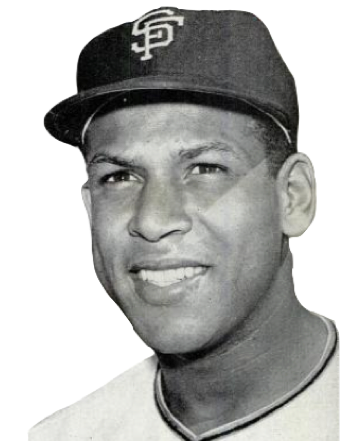
Orlando Cepeda

Monday, October 15, 1962 12:00 pm (PT) at Candlestick Park in San Francisco, California
Team	1	2	3	4	5	6	7	8	9	R	H	E
New York	0	0	0	0	1	0	0	1	0	2	3	2
San Francisco	0	0	0	3	2	0	0	0	X	5	10	1
WP: Billy Pierce (1–1) LP: Whitey Ford (1–1); Home runs: NYY: Roger Maris (1); SF: None

In a battle of left-handed starting pitchers, Billy Pierce outdueled Whitey Ford with a complete-game three-hitter as the Giants evened the series at three wins apiece with a 5–2 victory. They struck first in the fourth when after a single and walk, an error on an attempted pickoff by Ford allowed a run to score, then Orlando Cepeda's double and Jim Davenport's single scored a run each. They added to their lead next inning on RBI singles by Felipe Alou and Cepeda. The Yankees' only runs came on a Maris home run in the fifth inning and an RBI single by Tony Kubek in the eighth inning after a one-out double.

=== Game 7 ===
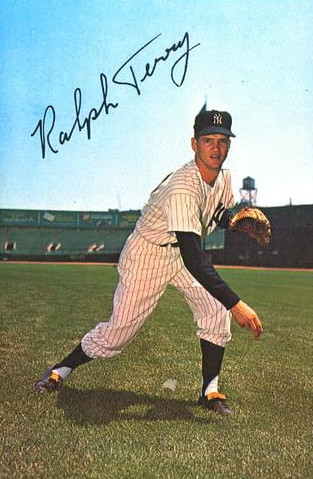
Ralph Terry

Tuesday, October 16, 1962 12:00 pm (PT) at Candlestick Park in San Francisco, California
Team	1	2	3	4	5	6	7	8	9	R	H	E
New York	0	0	0	0	1	0	0	0	0	1	7	0
San Francisco	0	0	0	0	0	0	0	0	0	0	4	1
WP: Ralph Terry (2–1) LP: Jack Sanford (1–2)

The only run of this classic game came in the fifth inning when Tony Kubek grounded into a double play, Bill Skowron scoring from third. Ralph Terry, pitching the seventh game instead of Jim Bouton because of the rain delays, had given up Bill Mazeroski's Series-winning walk-off home run two years earlier in Pittsburgh, but in his third start stifled the Giants' power hitters. In the bottom of the ninth, pinch-hitter Matty Alou, batting for reliever Billy O'Dell, led off the inning with a bunt hit after first having a foul ball dropped, but Terry struck out the next two batters, Felipe Alou and Hiller. Mays hit a double into the right-field corner, but Maris played the carom well, then hit cutoff man Richardson with a throw that was quickly relayed home. Alou, aware of Maris' strong arm, stopped at third. Facing Willie McCovey with two outs, Terry elected to pitch to him rather than walk the bases loaded, which would have brought up slugger Orlando Cepeda. Terry's inside fastball on the second pitch handcuffed McCovey, who nonetheless adjusted his bat in mid-swing to extend his arms and hit a bullet right at Richardson for the final out. Terry was named the World Series MVP after posting a 2–1 record with two complete games pitched, a shutout, 16 strikeouts, five earned runs off 17 hits, and a 1.80 ERA in 25 innings pitched.

As of 2026, this is the last time the Yankees won Game 7 of the World Series, as the next two seven-game World Series that featured the Yankees were won by their opponents (1964, 2001).

== Composite box ==
1962 World Series (4–3): New York Yankees (A.L.) over San Francisco Giants (N.L.)

Team	1	2	3	4	5	6	7	8	9	R	H	E
New York Yankees	2	0	0	1	2	3	4	6	2	20	44	5
San Francisco Giants	1	3	2	3	3	0	5	0	4	21	51	8
Total attendance: 376,864 Average attendance: 53,838; Winning player's share: $9,883 Losing player's share: $7,291

== Quotes ==
Ralph Terry gets set. Here's the pitch to Willie. There's a liner straight to Richardson! The ballgame is over and the World Series is over!

— George Kell, calling the last out of Game 7 on NBC Radio.

== Aftermath ==
The season was a high-mark for Dark in San Francisco, despite some close brushes for further success. Despite winning 88 and 90 games in the next two years, the Giants could only take solace in finishing in the top division of the National League (until division play was instituted in 1969), and Dark was fired after the 1964 season. The Giants would make their next postseason appearance in 1971, but lost in the NLCS to the eventual World Series champion Pittsburgh Pirates in four games.

The Giants would eventually return to the World Series in 1989, but were swept by the Oakland Athletics in the only all-Bay Area Fall Classic. They would also return in 2002, but they lost to the Anaheim Angels in seven games after being six outs away from the championship in Game 6, and the Giants’ collapse in the 2002 series has been cited as another manifestation of the Curse of Coogan's Bluff. The Giants would finally bring the first Series championship to San Francisco in 2010, defeating the Texas Rangers in five games, which also marked the start of a dynasty for the team. During Ring Night ceremonies in April 2011, Mays, McCovey, and Cepeda received honorary 2010 World Series rings.

The Yankees would return to the World Series the next two seasons for Houk and then Berra when the former moved to the front office in 1963 and 1964, but lost both to the Los Angeles Dodgers and St. Louis Cardinals in four and seven games respectively. Then, the Yankee dynasty soon began to crumble under the chains of retiring players and new management, which resulted in a 15-year championship drought.

For the Peanuts comic strip of December 22, 1962, cartoonist and Giants fan Charles M. Schulz depicted Charlie Brown sitting glumly with Linus, lamenting in the last panel, "Why couldn't McCovey have hit the ball just three feet higher?" The January 28, 1963, strip featured a nearly identical scene, except in the last panel Charlie Brown moaned, "Or why couldn't McCovey have hit the ball even two feet higher?"

During the 1981 Major League Baseball strike, Giants radio flagship KNBR rebroadcast Game 7, electronically re-editing NBC Radio announcer George Kell's description to make it sound as if McCovey's ninth-inning liner had gotten past Richardson, with Alou and Mays scoring to win the game and Series for San Francisco.

The 1962 Dodgers and Giants were the first among California MLB teams to win 100 games in a season. In such seasons by the Giants, Dodgers, Athletics, and Angels (the Padres have yet to win 100 games in a season), those teams have won 100 games or more 18 times, but did not win a World Series in any of these seasons. To date, no California team to has won a World Series with 100 wins or more in a single season.

== See also ==
- 1962 Japan Series
- Golden pitch
- Giants–Yankees rivalry
- Curse of Coogan's Bluff
