= Whitey Ford =

American baseball player (1928–2020)

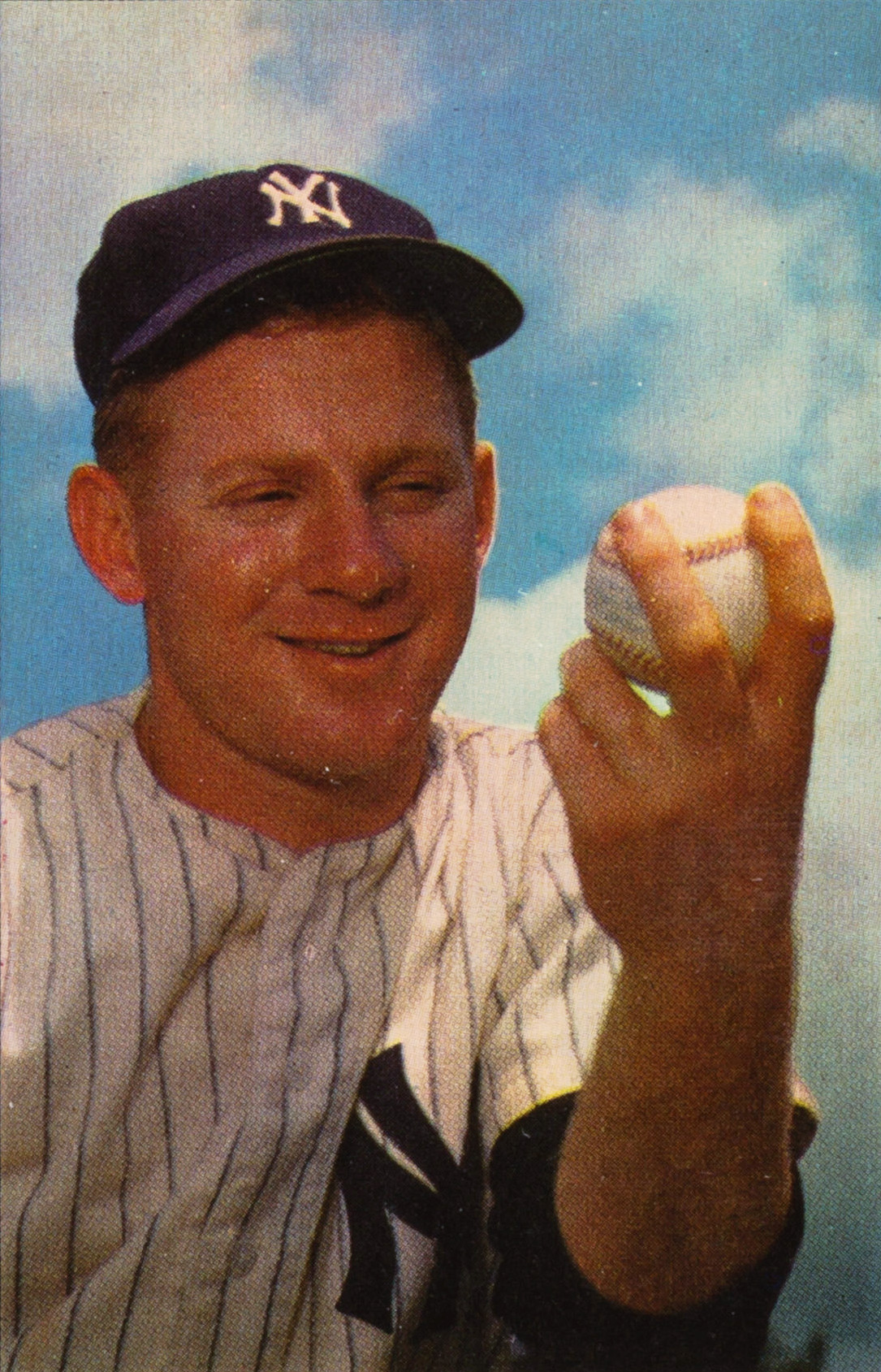
- Ford in 1953
- Pitcher
- Born: October 21, 1928; Manhattan, New York, U.S.
- Died: October 8, 2020 (aged 91); Lake Success, New York, U.S.
- Batted: Left Threw: Left

MLB debut
- July 1, 1950, for the New York Yankees

Last MLB appearance
- May 21, 1967, for the New York Yankees

MLB statistics
- Win–loss record: 236–106
- Earned run average: 2.75
- Strikeouts: 1,956
- Stats at Baseball Reference

Teams
- As player: New York Yankees (1950, 1953–1967); As coach: New York Yankees (1964, 1968, 1974–1975)

Career highlights and awards
- 10× All-Star (1954–1956, 1958, 1959, 1960–1961², 1964); 6× World Series champion (1950, 1953, 1956, 1958, 1961, 1962); Cy Young Award (1961); World Series MVP (1961); 3× AL wins leader (1955, 1961, 1963); 2× MLB ERA leader (1956, 1958); New York Yankees No. 16 retired; Monument Park honoree

Member of the National

Baseball Hall of Fame
- Induction: 1974
- Vote: 77.8% (second ballot)

Edward Charles "Whitey" Ford (October 21, 1928 – October 8, 2020), nicknamed "the Chairman of the Board", was an American professional baseball pitcher who played his entire 16-year Major League Baseball (MLB) career with the New York Yankees. He was a 10-time All-Star and six-time World Series champion. In 1961, he won both the Cy Young Award and World Series Most Valuable Player Award. Ford led the American League (AL) in wins three times and in earned run average twice. He is the Yankees franchise leader in career wins (236), shutouts (45), and innings pitched (3,170 1/3), and joint leader in games started by a pitcher (438). Ford was inducted into the Baseball Hall of Fame in 1974.

Ford signed with the Yankees as an amateur free agent in 1947 and made his major league debut in 1950. Following a two-year sojourn to serve in the United States Army during the Korean War, Ford returned to the Yankees in 1953 and pitched for them until retiring in 1967. During his tenure with the team, Ford set numerous World Series pitching records, including consecutive scoreless innings (33), wins (10), games started (22), innings pitched (146), and strikeouts (94). The Yankees retired his uniform number 16 in 1974 and dedicated a plaque in his honor in Monument Park in 1987. Ford served as the Yankees pitching coach in 1964 while still a player and from 1974 to 1975 after retiring. He also served as the team's first base coach in 1968.

In the wake of Yogi Berra's death in 2015, George Vecsey of The New York Times suggested that Ford was now "The Greatest Living Yankee". Ford died on October 8, 2020, at the age of 91.

== Early life ==
Ford was born in Manhattan. At age five, he moved to the Astoria neighborhood of Queens, a few miles from the Triborough Bridge to Yankee Stadium in the Bronx. He attended public schools and graduated from the Manhattan High School of Aviation Trades.

In 1951, Ford married Joan Foran at St. Patrick's Catholic Church in Astoria. They lived in Glen Cove, New York on Long Island for a period during the 1950s, and had two sons and a daughter together.

== Professional career ==
=== Early years ===
Ford was signed by the New York Yankees as an amateur free agent in 1947 and played his entire career with them. While still in the minor leagues, he was nicknamed "Whitey" for his light blond hair.

Ford began his Major League Baseball career on July 1, 1950, with the Yankees. He won his first nine decisions before losing a game in relief. Ford received a handful of lower-ballot Most Valuable Player (MVP) votes despite throwing just 112 innings, and won the Sporting News Rookie of the Year Award.

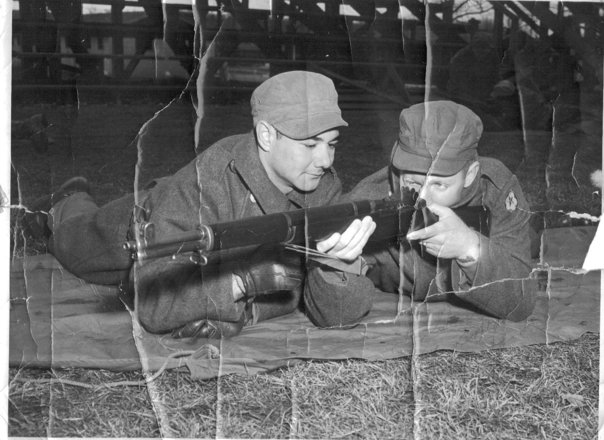
Ford shooting a rifle in training for the military

During the Korean War era, in 1951 and 1952, Ford served in the United States Army. He rejoined the Yankees for the 1953 season, and the Yankee "Big Three" pitching staff became a "Big Four", as Ford joined Allie Reynolds, Vic Raschi, and Eddie Lopat. Ford wore number 19 in his rookie season, but upon his return he changed to number 16, which he wore for the remainder of his career.

Ford eventually went from the number-four pitcher on a great staff to the universally acclaimed number-one pitcher of the Yankees. He became known as the "Chairman of the Board" for his ability to remain calm and in command during high-pressure situations. He was also known as "Slick", a nickname given to him, Billy Martin, and Mickey Mantle by manager Casey Stengel, who called them Whiskey Slicks. Ford's guile was necessary because he did not have an overwhelming fastball, but being able to throw several other pitches very well gave him pinpoint control. Ford was an effective strikeout pitcher for his time, tying the then-AL record of six consecutive strikeouts in 1956, and again in 1958. Ford never threw a no-hitter, but he pitched two consecutive one-hit games in 1955 to tie a record held by several pitchers. Sal Maglie, star pitcher for the New York Giants, thought Ford had a similar style to his own, writing in 1958 that Ford had a "good curve, good control, [a] changeup, [and an] occasional sneaky fastball."

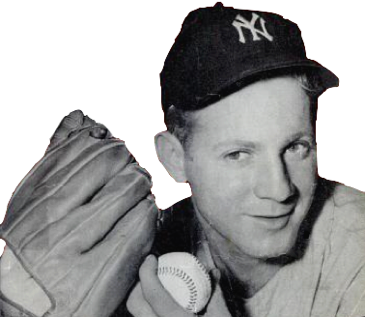
Ford in 1954

In 1955, Ford led the American League in complete games and games won; in 1956 in earned run average and winning percentage; in 1958, in earned run average; and in both 1961 and 1963, in games won and winning percentage. Ford won the Cy Young Award in 1961; he likely would have won the 1963 AL Cy Young, but this was before the institution of a separate award for each league, and Ford could not match Sandy Koufax's numbers for the Los Angeles Dodgers of the National League (NL).

Some of Ford's totals were depressed by Yankees' manager Casey Stengel, who viewed Ford as his top pitching asset and often reserved his ace left-hander for more formidable opponents such as the Cleveland Indians and Chicago White Sox. When Ralph Houk became the manager in 1961, he promised Ford that he would pitch every fourth day, regardless of the opponent; after exceeding 30 starts only once in his nine seasons under Stengel, Ford had 39 in 1961. Indeed 1961 was his first 20-win season, a career-best 25–4 record, and the Cy Young Award ensued, but Ford's season was overshadowed by the home run battle between Roger Maris and Mickey Mantle. As a left-hander with an excellent pick-off move, Ford was also deft at keeping runners at their base: He set a record in 1961 by pitching 243 consecutive innings without allowing a stolen base.

In May 1963, after pitching a shutout, Ford announced he had given up smoking. He said, "My doctor told me that whenever I think of smoking, I should think of a bus starting up and blowing the exhaust in my face."

=== Final years and retirement ===
Ford ended his career in declining health. In August 1966, he underwent surgery to correct a circulatory problem in his throwing shoulder. In May 1967, Ford lasted just one inning in what would be his final start, and he announced his retirement at the end of the month at age 38.

After retiring, Ford admitted in interviews to having occasionally doctored baseballs. Examples were the "mudball", used at home in Yankee Stadium. Yankee groundskeepers would wet down an area near the catcher's box where the Yankee catcher Elston Howard was positioned; pretending to lose balance, Howard would put down his hand with the ball and coat one side of the ball with mud and throw it to Ford. Ford also engaged in ball scuffing, sometimes used the diamond in his wedding ring to gouge the ball, but he was eventually caught by an umpire and warned to stop. Howard sharpened a buckle on his shinguard and used it to scuff the ball.

Ford described his illicit behavior as a concession to age:

I didn't begin cheating until late in my career when I needed something to help me survive. I didn't cheat when I won the twenty-five games in 1961. I don't want anybody to get any ideas and take my Cy Young Award away. And I didn't cheat in 1963 when I won twenty-four games. Well, maybe a little.

Ford admitted to doctoring the ball in the 1961 All-Star Game at Candlestick Park to strike out Willie Mays. Ford and Mantle had accumulated $1,200 ($12,772 today) in golf pro shop purchases as guests of Horace Stoneham at the Giants owner's country club. Stoneham promised to pay their tab if Ford could strike out Mays. "What was that all about?" Mays asked. "I'm sorry, Willie, but I had to throw you a spitter," Ford replied.

== Career statistics ==
Category	Seasons	W	L	Pct	ERA	G	GS	CG	SHO	SV	IP	H	ER	R	HR	BAA	BB	K	WP	HBP	Fld%	Avg.	HR	RBI	SH
Total	16	236	106	.690	2.75	498	438	156	45	11	3170 1/3	2,766	967	1,107	228	.235	1,086	1,956	75	28	.961	.173	3	69	65

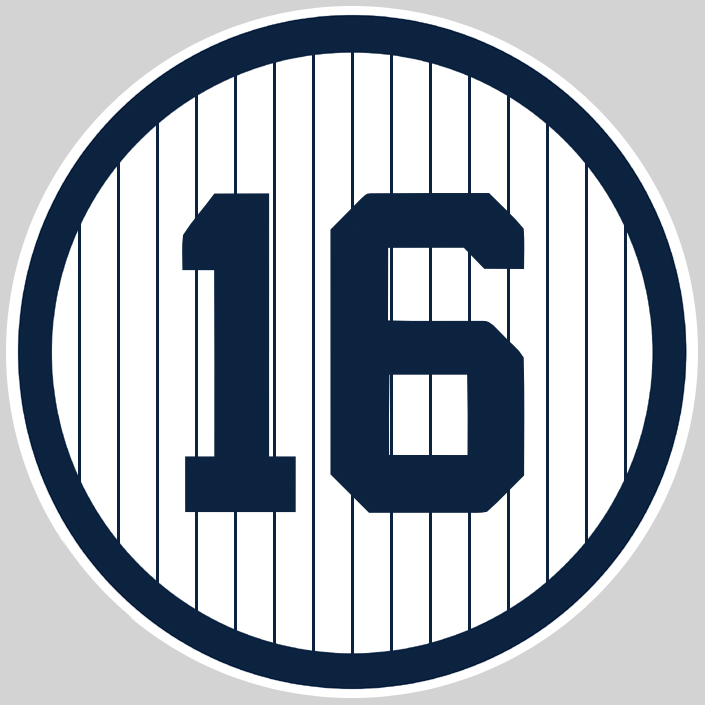
Whitey Ford's number 16 was retired by the New York Yankees in 1974.

Ford is tied with Dave Foutz for the fourth-best winning percentage in baseball history at .690. His 2.75 earned run average is the third-lowest among starting pitchers whose careers began after the advent of the live-ball era in 1920. Through 2023, only Clayton Kershaw (2.48) and Jacob deGrom (2.53) have a lower earned run average. Ford's worst earned run average in a single season was 3.24.

He appeared on eight AL All-Star teams between 1954 and 1964, going 0-2 with an 8.25 ERA in the All-Star game.

=== World Series ===
During his MLB career, Ford had 10 World Series victories, more than any other pitcher. Ford also leads all starters in World Series losses (8) and starts (22), as well as innings, hits, walks, and strikeouts. In 1961, he broke Babe Ruth's World Series record of 29 2/3 consecutive scoreless innings. The record eventually reached 33 2/3, although MLB rule-makers retroactively reduced the record to 33 innings since Ford did not complete a full inning before allowing the streak-ending run. It is still a World Series record, although Mariano Rivera broke it as a postseason record in 2000. Ford won the 1961 World Series MVP Award.

He batted .082 (4-for-49) with 4 runs, 3 runs batted in, and 7 walks in the Fall Classic.

== Honors and legacy ==
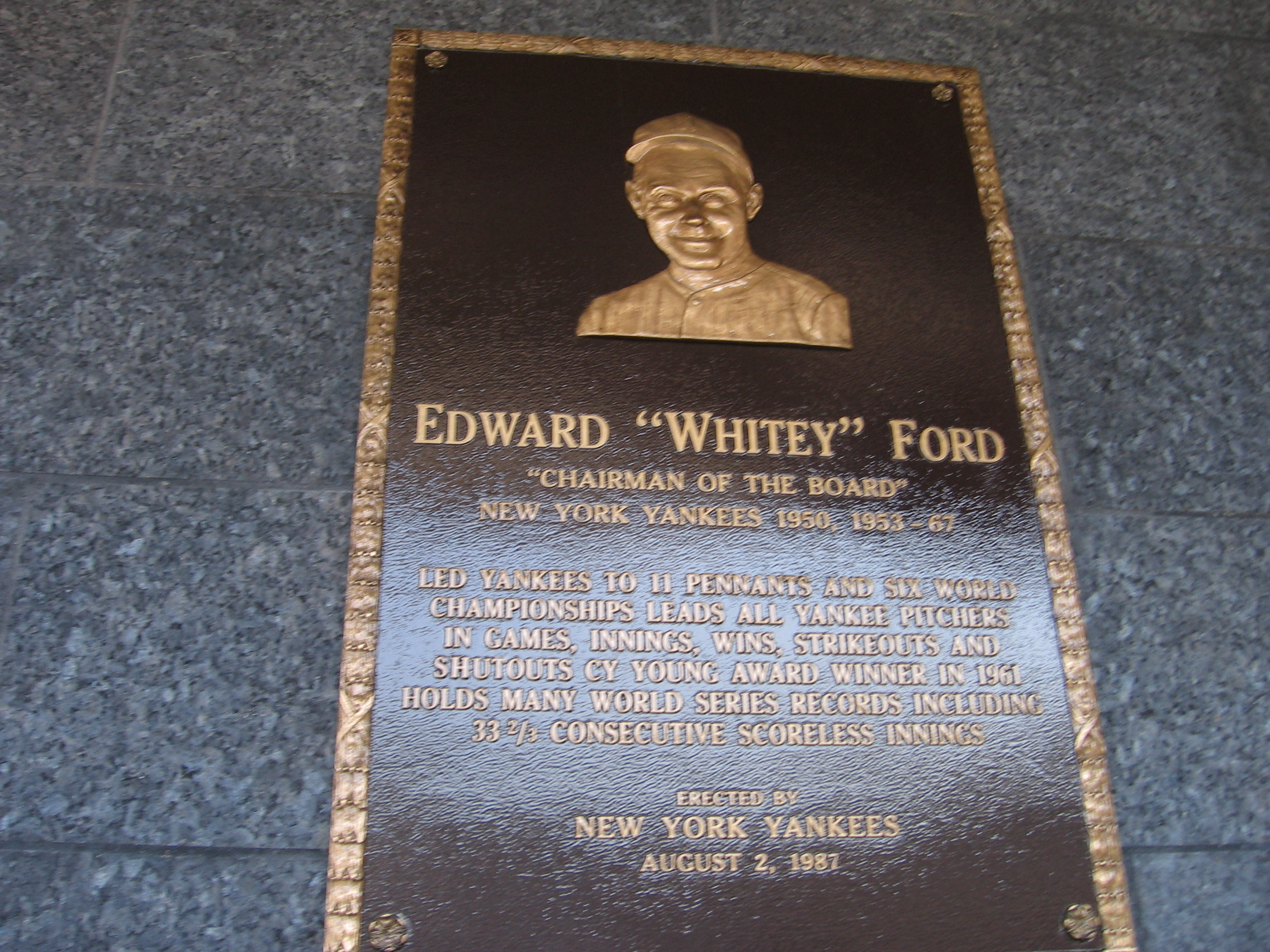
Ford's plaque at Monument Park in Yankee Stadium

In 1974, Ford and Mickey Mantle were both elected to the National Baseball Hall of Fame; at that time, the Yankees retired his number 16.

In 1984, Ford was elected to the Long Island Sports Hall of Fame.

In 1987, the Yankees dedicated plaques for Monument Park at Yankee Stadium for Ford and Lefty Gomez.

In 1999, Ford ranked 52nd on The Sporting News List of Baseball's Greatest Players. He was nominated that year for the Major League Baseball All-Century Team.

In 1994, a road in Mississauga, Ontario, was named Ford Road in his honor. The north-central area of Mississauga is known informally as "the baseball zone", as several streets in the area are named for Hall of Fame baseball players.

In 2000, the ballfield overlooking the East River on 26th Avenue, between 1st and 2nd Streets in Astoria, Queens, was named Whitey Ford Field at a Yankee Stadium ceremony.

== Post-playing career ==
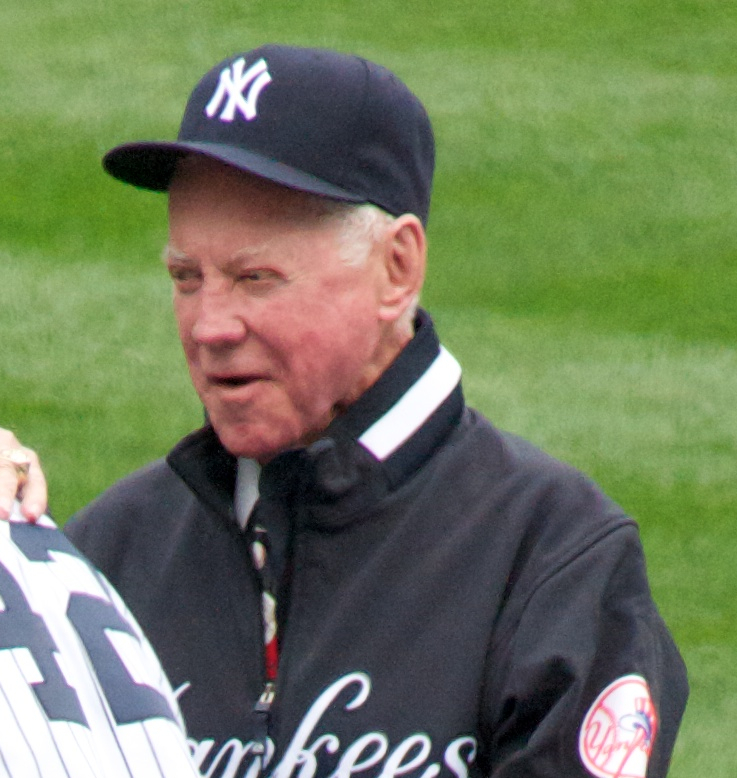
Ford in 2010

Ford was the Yankees pitching coach during the 1964 season. In 1968, he served as the Yankees as first base coach and in 1974 and 1975 as pitching coach.

In 1977, Ford was part of the broadcast team for the first game in Toronto Blue Jays history. In 2008, Ford threw the first pitch at the 2008 Major League Baseball All-Star Game. Also in 1977, Ford began serving as the commissioner of the new American Professional Slow-Pitch Softball League (APSPL), one of several men's professional softball leagues in the United States.

In 2002, Ford opened "Whitey Ford's Cafe", a sports-themed restaurant and bar next to Roosevelt Field Mall in Garden City, New York. A replica of the Yankee Stadium facade trimmed both the exterior and the bar, whose stools displayed uniform numbers of Yankee luminaries and widescreen TVs were installed throughout. The main dining area housed a panoramic display of Yankee Stadium from the 1950s, specifically a Chicago White Sox–Yankee game with Ford pitching and Mickey Mantle in center field; the Yanks were up 2–0. The servers were dressed in Yankees road uniforms, with Ford's No. 16 on the back. It lasted less than a year before it closed down.

As of 2015, the 86-year-old Ford was splitting his time between his homes in Long Island and Florida.

Ford died on October 8, 2020, at his home in Lake Success on Long Island at the age of 91, 13 days before his 92nd birthday. He was watching the Yankees play in Game 4 of the 2020 American League Division Series on television, and was surrounded by his family. The cause of death was not immediately announced, but he had suffered from dementia for several years. When he died he was the second-oldest living member of the Hall of Fame, after Tommy Lasorda. He was the last surviving member of the 1956 World Champion New York Yankees.

== Representation in other media ==
- Ford and Mantle made cameo appearances on a 1984 episode of Remington Steele starring Pierce Brosnan.
- In 1997, Ford was depicted in The Simpsons episode "The Twisted World of Marge Simpson", where he is knocked unconscious by pretzels thrown by an angry crowd at a baseball game. Homer later suggests that Marge could call the pretzels "Whitey Whackers".
- In 1998, Grammy Award–winning musician Everlast released a CD entitled Whitey Ford Sings the Blues, and assumed "Whitey Ford" as a nickname.
- Ford was portrayed by Anthony Michael Hall in the HBO movie, 61* (2001), about Roger Maris and Mickey Mantle's 1961 quest to break Babe Ruth's single-season home run record. It was directed by Billy Crystal.
- Ford is one of two central figures in Robert Pinsky's poem "The Night Game", the other being fellow Hall of Fame left-hander Sandy Koufax.

== See also ==
- List of Major League Baseball annual ERA leaders
- List of Major League Baseball annual wins leaders
- List of Major League Baseball career ERA leaders
- List of Major League Baseball career shutout leaders
- List of Major League Baseball career strikeout leaders
- List of Major League Baseball career wins leaders
- List of Major League Baseball players who spent their entire career with one franchise
- List of World Series starting pitchers

Sporting positions
Preceded by Johnny Sain; Jim Turner	New York Yankees pitching coach 1964; 1974–1975	Succeeded by Cot Deal; Cloyd Boyer
Preceded by Loren Babe	New York Yankees first-base coach 1968	Succeeded by Elston Howard
