= Night Game =

A night game is a game played under artificial lights.

Night Game may also refer to:

- Night Game (film), a 1989 baseball mystery film
- Night Game (novel), a paranormal romance novel by Christine Feehan
- The Night Game, an American rock band
- Night Game, a 1992 mystery novel by Alison Gordon
- NightSky, a video game by Nicklas Nygren previously known as Night Game
- "Night Game", a song by Paul Simon from the 1975 album Still Crazy After All These Years
- "The Night Game" (poem), a poem by Robert Pinsky

== See also ==
- Night Games (disambiguation)
