= List of San Francisco Giants no-hitters =

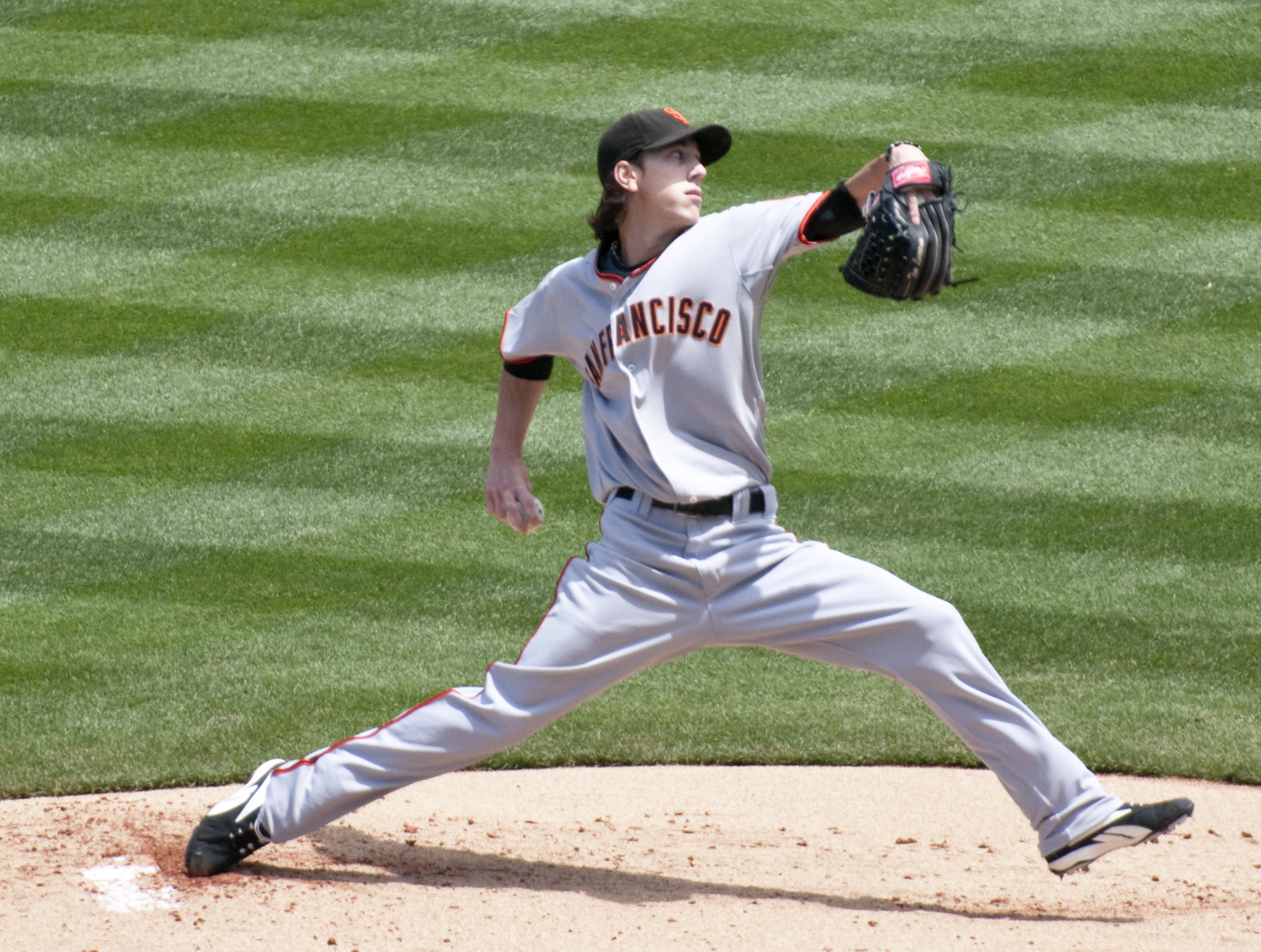
Tim Lincecum pitched two no-hitters for the Giants.

The San Francisco Giants are a Major League Baseball franchise based in San Francisco, California. They play in the National League West division. Also known in their early years as the "New York Gothams" (1883–84) and "New York Giants" (1885–1957), pitchers for the Giants have thrown 18 no-hitters in franchise history. A no-hitter is officially recognized by Major League Baseball only "when a pitcher (or pitchers) allows no hits during the entire course of a game, which consists of at least nine innings", although one or more batters "may reach base via a walk, an error, a hit by pitch, a passed ball or wild pitch on strike three, or catcher's interference." No-hitters of less than nine complete innings were previously recognized by the league as official; however, several rule alterations in 1991 changed the rule to its current form. A no-hitter is rare enough that teams may go decades without recording one. A perfect game, a special subcategory of no-hitter, was finally thrown by Matt Cain on June 13, 2012. As defined by Major League Baseball, "in a perfect game, no batter reaches any base during the course of the game." Previously, this feat came closest on July 4, 1908 when Hooks Wiltse was hit by a pitch with two outs in the ninth and a scoreless tie. The plate umpire, Cy Rigler, claimed he should have called the previous pitch strike three, that would have ended the inning with a perfection. Wiltse would go on to retire all three in the tenth to end the game after the Giants scored a run in the top of the tenth.

Amos Rusie threw the first no-hitter in Giants history on July 31, 1891; the most recent no-hitter was thrown by Blake Snell on August 2, 2024. Six left-handed pitchers have thrown no-hitters in franchise history, including the most recent no-hitter author, Snell. The other ten pitchers were right-handers. Tim Lincecum and Hall of Famer Christy Mathewson are the only pitchers to throw more than one no-hitter in a Giants uniform. Ten no-hitters were thrown at home and seven on the road. The Giants threw one in April, two in May, five in June, five in July, one in August, and three in September. The longest interval between no-hitters was between the games pitched by Hubbell and Juan Marichal, encompassing 34 years, 1 month, and 7 days from May 8, 1929 till June 15, 1963. Conversely, the shortest interval between no-hitters was between the two games pitched by Lincecum, a period of 347 days. (Note: Heston's no-hitter came 349 days after Lincecum's second no-hitter.) The Giants have no-hit the Philadelphia Phillies and San Diego Padres the most, doing so three times each—Wiltse in 1908; Jeff Tesreau in 1912; Jesse Barnes in 1922; Jonathan Sánchez in 2009; and Tim Lincecum in 2013 and 2014. Every Giants no-hitter has been a shutout (which is likely, but not a given, considering baserunners can reach, advance, and score by methods other than hits). The most baserunners allowed in a no-hitter was five, which occurred in Lincecum's first no-hitter. Of the 18 no-hitters, four have been won by a score of 1–0, more common than any other result. Those 1–0 no-hitters were attained by Christy Mathewson in 1905, Wiltse in 1908, Juan Marichal in 1963, and Gaylord Perry in 1968. The largest margin of victory in a Giants no-hitter was an 11–0 win by Carl Hubbell in 1929. Matt Cain is tied with Sandy Koufax for the most strikeouts in a perfect no-hitter with 14.

The umpire is also an integral part of any no-hitter. The task of the umpire in a baseball game is to make any decision "which involves judgment, such as, but not limited to, whether a batted ball is fair or foul, whether a pitch is a strike or a ball, or whether a runner is safe or out… [the umpire's judgment on such matters] is final." Part of the duties of the umpire making calls at home plate includes defining the strike zone, which "is defined as that area over homeplate (sic) the upper limit of which is a horizontal line at the midpoint between the top of the shoulders and the top of the uniform pants, and the lower level is a line at the hollow beneath the kneecap." These calls define every baseball game and are therefore integral to the completion of any no-hitter. 17 different umpires presided over each of the franchise's 18 no-hitters.

The manager is another integral part of any no-hitter. The tasks of the manager include determining the starting rotation, the batting order and defensive lineup in every game, and how long a pitcher stays in the game. There have been nine different managers in the franchise's 18 no-hitters.

== No-hitters ==
¶	Indicates a perfect game
£	Pitcher was left-handed
*	Member of the National Baseball Hall of Fame and Museum

#	Date	Pitcher	Final score	Base- runners	Opponent	Catcher	Plate umpire	Manager	Notes	Ref
1	July 31, 1891	Amos Rusie*	6–0	1	Brooklyn Grooms	Artie Clarke	Phil Powers	James Mutrie	First no-hitter in franchise history; First Giants no-hitter at home; First right-handed pitcher to throw a no-hitter in franchise history	
2	July 15, 1901	Christy Mathewson* (1)	5–0	2	@ St. Louis Cardinals	Jack Warner	Frank Dwyer	George Davis	First Giants no-hitter on the road	
3	June 13, 1905	Christy Mathewson* (2)	1–0	2	@ Chicago Cubs	Roger Bresnahan (1)	George Bausewine	John McGraw (1)	Smallest margin of victory in a Giants no-hitter (tie)	
4	July 4, 1908	Hooks Wiltse^{£}	1–0 (10)	1	Philadelphia Phillies	Roger Bresnahan (2)	Cy Rigler (1)	John McGraw (2)	Only baserunner was hit by pitch with two outs in the ninth; Smallest margin of victory in a Giants no-hitter (tie); First left-handed pitcher to throw a no-hitter in franchise history; First extra-inning no-hitter in franchise history and second in MLB history	
5	September 6, 1912	Jeff Tesreau	3–0	3	@ Philadelphia Phillies	Chief Meyers (1)	Bill Klem	John McGraw (3)	First game of a doubleheader	
6	April 15, 1915	Rube Marquard^{£}	2–0	4	Brooklyn Robins	Chief Meyers (2)	Cy Rigler (2)	John McGraw (4)	Game 2 of season; Earliest calendar date of Giants no-hitter	
7	May 7, 1922	Jesse Barnes	6–0	1	Philadelphia Phillies	Earl Smith	Bob Hart	John McGraw (5)		
8	May 8, 1929	Carl Hubbell^{£}*	11–0	1	Pittsburgh Pirates	Bob O'Farrell	Charlie Moran	John McGraw (6)	Largest margin of victory in a Giants no-hitter; Last no-hitter before moving to San Francisco	
9	June 15, 1963	Juan Marichal*	1–0	2	Houston Colt .45s	Ed Bailey	Ed Sudol	Al Dark	First no-hitter since moving to San Francisco; Longest interval between no-hitters in franchise history; Smallest margin of victory in a Giants no-hitter (tie)	
10	September 17, 1968	Gaylord Perry*	1–0	2	St. Louis Cardinals	Dick Dietz	Harry Wendelstedt	Herman Franks	Smallest margin of victory in a Giants no-hitter (tie); The next day at the same park, the Cardinals' Ray Washburn no-hit the Giants	
11	August 24, 1975	Ed Halicki	6–0	2	New York Mets	Dave Rader	Bruce Froemming	Wes Westrum	Second game of a doubleheader; Last no-hitter by a Giants pitcher at Candlestick Park	
12	September 29, 1976	John Montefusco	9–0	1	@ Atlanta Braves	Gary Alexander	Paul Pryor	Bill Rigney	Latest calendar date of Giants no-hitter	
13	July 10, 2009	Jonathan Sánchez^{£}	8–0	1	San Diego Padres	Eli Whiteside	Brian Runge	Bruce Bochy (1)	First no-hitter at AT&T Park; First no-hitter by a left-handed Giants pitcher in 80 years; Only baserunner was reached on error with one out in the eighth	
14	June 13, 2012	Matt Cain^{¶}	10–0	0	Houston Astros	Buster Posey (1)	Ted Barrett	Bruce Bochy (2)	First perfect game in Giants franchise history	
15	July 13, 2013	Tim Lincecum (1)	9–0	5	@ San Diego Padres	Buster Posey (2)	Mark Wegner	Bruce Bochy (3)	First no-hitter thrown in San Diego's Petco Park; Most baserunners allowed in a Giants no-hitter	
16	June 25, 2014	Tim Lincecum (2)	4–0	1	San Diego Padres	Héctor Sánchez	Adam Hamari	Bruce Bochy (4)	Shortest interval between no-hitters in franchise history; Second pitcher to no-hit the same team twice	
17	June 9, 2015	Chris Heston	5–0	3	@ New York Mets	Buster Posey (3)	Rob Drake (2)	Bruce Bochy (5)	Heston's rookie season; No walks, three hit batsmen	
18	August 2, 2024	Blake Snell^{£}	3–0	3	@ Cincinnati Reds	Patrick Bailey	Malachi Moore	Bob Melvin	Most recent Giants no-hitter; First complete game in Snell's career	
