= Night Games =

Night Games may refer to:

== Film ==
- Night Games (1966 film), a 1966 Swedish film directed by Mai Zetterling
- Night Games (1980 film), a 1980 film directed by Roger Vadim

== Music ==
- "Night Games" (Charley Pride song), 1983
- "Night Games" (Graham Bonnet song), 1981
- "Night Games", by Stephanie Mills on her album Stephanie, 1981

== Other uses ==
- Night Games (book), a 2013 book by Anna Krien
  - Night Games, upcoming TV series based on the book, directed by Samantha Lang

== See also ==
- Night Game (disambiguation)
