= Horace Stoneham =

Baseball executive (1903–1990)

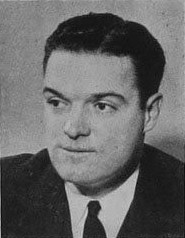
- Stoneham at the first game of the World Series, 6 October 1937.
- Born: April 27, 1903; Newark, New Jersey, U.S.
- Died: January 7, 1990 (aged 86); Scottsdale, Arizona, U.S.
- Occupation: Baseball executive
- Known for: Relocating the Giants from Manhattan to San Francisco
- Spouse: Valleda Pyke (m. 1931)
- Children: 2
- Parent(s): Charles Stoneham (father); Johanna McGoldrick (mother)
- Relatives: Chub Feeney (nephew)
- Baseball career

Career highlights and awards
- As president: World Series champion (1954)

Horace Charles Stoneham (/ˈstoʊnəm/ STOW-nəm; April 27, 1903 – January 7, 1990) was an American sports executive and the president and principal owner of the New York / San Francisco Giants of Major League Baseball from January 1936 to January 1976. During his 40-year tenure, the Giants won the 1954 World Series plus four National League pennants in 1936, 1937, 1951, and 1962, and an NL West division title in 1971. Upon relocating the franchise from Manhattan to San Francisco in 1957, Stoneham became one of two NL owners to bring the major leagues to the U.S. West Coast.

Although the Giants won only one pennant (1962) and one division title (1971) in their first 15 years after moving to the Bay Area, they were a consistent contender that featured some of the era's biggest stars. But during the mid-1970s, lacklustre on-field performance and dwindling attendance forced Stoneham to sell the team in 1976.

Stoneham's ownership witnessed three separate pennant-contending and -winning eras: the team that he inherited, the 1936–38 Giants with Bill Terry, Carl Hubbell and Mel Ott; the 1949–55 teams of manager Leo Durocher, with Monte Irvin, Sal Maglie, Bobby Thomson and Willie Mays; and the star-studded 1958–71 Giants of Mays, Orlando Cepeda, Willie McCovey, Juan Marichal and Gaylord Perry.

== Family, education and early career ==
Horace Stoneham was born in Newark, New Jersey, on April 27, 1903, to stockbroker and financier Charles Stoneham and Johanna McGoldrick. On January 14, 1919, when Horace was 15, Charles Stoneham purchased controlling interest in the Giants, then one of the most prominent franchises in the National League. The young Stoneham studied at the Hun School of Princeton and graduated from Trinity-Pawling School in 1921. He briefly attended Fordham University but dropped out after four days and was sent by his father to work in a copper mine in California during the winter of 1923–24. He returned at his father's insistence to the Giants' spring training camp in Sarasota, Florida, ahead of the 1924 season to begin his apprenticeship as a baseball executive and future owner.

He began by working on the Giants' grounds crew, then he managed the leasing of the team's Polo Grounds stadium for other sporting events, including football and boxing, and handled the team's travel and accommodation with club secretary Eddie Brannick. In the early 1930s, the young Stoneham would be admitted into Hall-of-Fame manager John McGraw's inner circle, where he worked closely with McGraw, Bill Terry (McGraw's successor), and his father.

On January 6, 1936, at age 32, Horace Stoneham inherited the Giants upon his father's death from a heart attack, becoming the youngest club owner in the National League's 60-year history. Under Terry, the Giants had won the 1933 World Series, and contended for the 1934 and 1935 pennants but fallen short by two and 8½ games to the St. Louis Cardinals and Chicago Cubs respectively.

== New York Giants ==
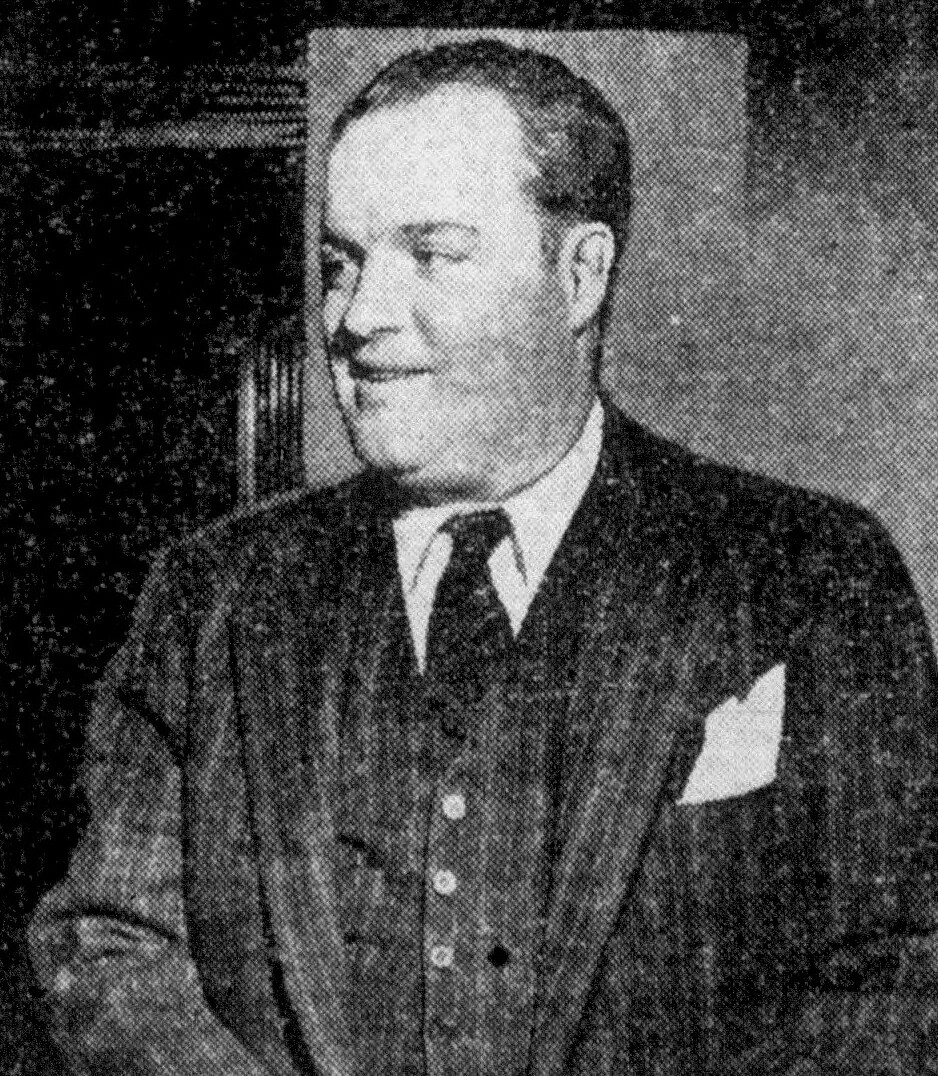
Stoneham, circa 1945

=== Early success, then struggles ===
Stoneham would soon become known as a hands-on owner who was concerned with the team's day-to-day operations, and personally involved in player trades and transactions. His first two Giants teams promptly won National League pennants. In 1936, Terry's last season as a player–manager, they defeated the Cardinals and Cubs by five games for the club's 14th NL championship. However, in the World Series, the Giants fell to the New York Yankees, four games to two. Terry then became Stoneham's full-time manager through 1941. In 1937, the Giants captured their 15th league title, besting Chicago by three full games, but they dropped the 1937 World Series in only five games to the Yankees of Lou Gehrig, Joe DiMaggio, Bill Dickey and Lefty Gomez. They finished third, behind the Cubs and Pittsburgh Pirates, in 1938, but then fell out of the NL's first division completely—coming in fifth in 1939, sixth in 1940, and fifth in 1941.

In December 1941, in the days surrounding the Attack on Pearl Harbor, plunging the U.S. into World War II, Stoneham made two headline-grabbing changes. On December 2, he replaced Terry with the club's slugging right-fielder, Mel Ott, 32, as playing manager. Then, on December 11, he acquired another future Hall-of-Fame slugger, Johnny Mize, from the Cardinals.

In Ott, Stoneham elevated the team's most popular and prominent player to the managerial role; though he was then a 16-year veteran of the Giants, "Master Melvin" was still in the prime of his career and would make three more NL All-Star teams while doubling as the club's manager. Stoneham tasked Terry with a major overhaul of the Giants' scouting and minor-league system—a makeover that would instead be supervised by yet another Hall-of-Fame former Giant star, Carl Hubbell, who succeeded Terry after the 1943 season. Stoneham's commitment to scouting and player development would bear fruit from the postwar period into the 1970s. Mize, 28 years old, was still in his prime, as the NL's All-Star first baseman.

But the Giants' on-field woes continued. In 1942, Ott led the league in home runs, runs scored and walks, and Mize led in runs batted in, but the team finished third in the National League. The Giants returned to the second division from 1943 through 1946, and finished last twice. The cellar-dwelling 1946 Giants, Stoneham's first postwar team, lost 93 games and finished 36 games behind pennant-winning St. Louis, despite the January purchase of three-time NL All-Star catcher Walker Cooper from the Cardinals for a team-record $175,000.

In 1947—led by Mize, Willard Marshall, Cooper and rookie Bobby Thomson—the slugging Giants set a new major-league record for home runs (221) in a 154-game season. On the mound, another rookie, right-hander Larry Jansen, won 21 games after Stoneham had purchased his contract from the Pacific Coast League. Ott, meanwhile, ended his 22-year playing career July 11 to focus on his managerial duties. The Giants returned to the first division, finishing fourth (81–73), but still lagged behind their arch-rivals, the Brooklyn Dodgers, by 13 games.

The 1948 Giants started well and held first place as late as June 8, but then they fell into a 12–20 funk by the All-Star break. Stoneham and Ott began to quietly discuss the manager's future. In their first day back in action after the break, with Ott still at the helm, the Giants split a July 15 doubleheader against the Pittsburgh Pirates at Forbes Field; at that point, they were 37–38, tied for fourth place (with Brooklyn), and 8½ games behind the NL's front-runners, the Boston Braves. Ott then handed Stoneham a letter of resignation, leaving the Giants without a manager.

=== The Durocher era ===
But, behind the scenes and with Ott's knowledge, Stoneham had been searching for a successor, and—during the Giants' doubleheader against the Pirates—he negotiated a deal with Dodgers' president Branch Rickey to release skipper Leo Durocher from his contract. The Dodgers had won the 1947 pennant under interim boss Burt Shotton, but the 1948 edition wasn't responding to Durocher upon his return from his year-long suspension for "conduct detrimental to baseball" and Rickey wanted to make a change. On the evening of July 15, Stoneham, Hubbell, and Chub Feeney, the team's young de facto general manager (and Stoneham's nephew), convened at Durocher's Upper East Side apartment, and signed him to become their new manager. The following morning, a shocked New York press corps learned that Ott was out, Shotton was back in Brooklyn's dugout, and Durocher had taken over the Giants. By the evening of July 17, Durocher was managing Stoneham's team in Pittsburgh.

Polo Grounds fans initially reviled Durocher as the obnoxious pilot of their arch-rivals, but he quickly produced an exciting team that just 2½ years later was in the World Series. Upon his hiring, Stoneham asked Durocher for a frank evaluation of his roster, and after leading the Giants to a mildly resurgent 41–38 record for the rest of 1948, the manager handed his owner a four-word report: "Back up the truck." "In other words," Durocher wrote in his 1975 autobiography, Nice Guys Finish Last, "You need a whole new team, Horace." Sophomores Jansen and Thomson, rookies Whitey Lockman and Don Mueller, and 26-year-old catcher Wes Westrum, a defensive standout, will remain. One-dimensional power hitters will be replaced by players who can run the bases and field their positions, as well as hit.

The 1949 season saw the retooling begin in earnest, although Stoneham's team itself (73–81) lost five games from its 1948 win column and remained in the NL's second division. In January, the Giants signed their first Black players, pitcher Ford Smith and outfielder Monte Irvin; on July 8, infielder Hank Thompson and future Hall of Famer Irvin broke the team's "color line" and made them the fourth of 16 MLB teams to integrate. Veterans Cooper, 34, and Mize, 36, were traded away during the season. Then, in December, the Giants vastly improved their middle infield defense by acquiring shortstop Alvin Dark and second baseman Eddie Stanky in a major trade with the Boston Braves that cost them two more slow-running sluggers, Marshall and Sid Gordon, among others.

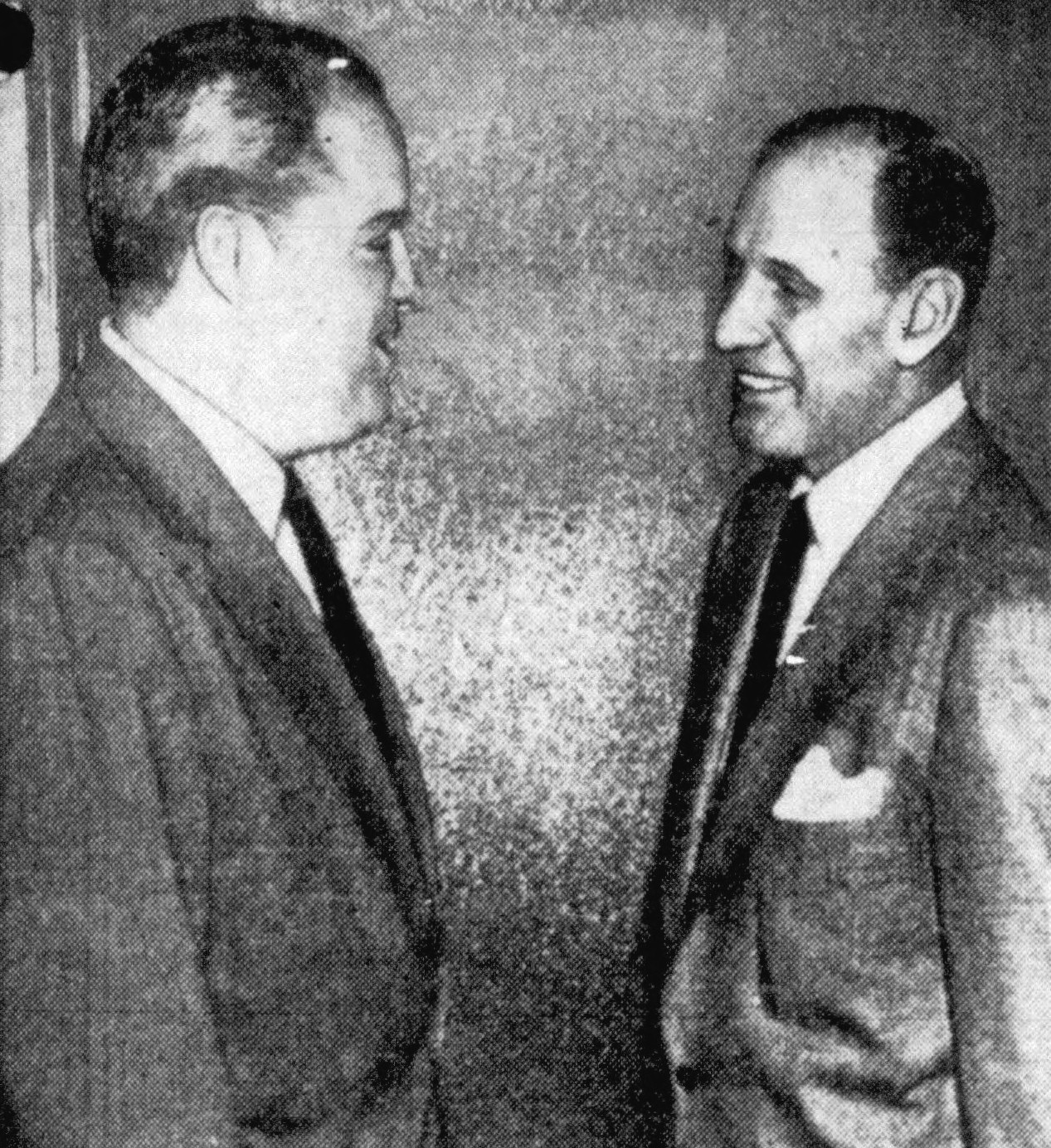
Stoneham (left) and Durocher (1949)

The following year, 1950, yielded palpable results. With Dark and Stanky up the middle, the Giants' defense turned 47 more double plays than it had in 1949. Irvin got into 110 games at first base and the outfield, and hit .299 with 15 home runs, while Thompson took over the third-base job and hit .289 with 20 homers. Pitcher Sal Maglie, back from a long suspension for "jumping" his 1946 contract to play in the Mexican League, went 18–4 (2.71). The Giants picked up veteran right-hander Jim Hearn on waivers from the Cardinals in July, and he went 11–3 (1.94) in 16 starts. Staff ace Jansen won 19 games—and he tied with Maglie and Hearn for the most shutouts (five) by an NL pitcher in 1950. The team itself won 86 of its 154 games, and finished third, only five games behind the Philadelphia Phillies.

But 1950's surpassing event came on June 20, when Giants' scout Ed Montague secured Willie Mays' signature on an amateur free agent contract. Mays, 19, was hitting .330 for the Birmingham Black Barons of the Negro American League. Only 116 minor-league games later, on May 25, 1951, he made his debut in the National League. Mays' immediate impact on the New York Giants will be massive.

The 1951 Giants lost 12 of their first 14 games of the season; by May 24, they had recovered to 17–19. Meanwhile, in 35 games for Triple-A Minneapolis, Mays had collected 71 hits, 29 for extra bases, and was hitting .477. The Giants recalled him, installed him in center field, and by season's end, Mays was the NL Rookie of the Year and a key member of a pennant-winning team. After trailing the Brooklyn Dodgers by 13½ games on August 11, the Giants won 37 of their final 44 regular-season games, caught Brooklyn on the season's final weekend, then won a thrilling, best-of-three tiebreaker series on the back of Bobby Thomson's three-run, walk-off home run in the deciding game in what was to be known as the "Shot Heard 'Round the World". Although they fell to the Yankees, four games to two, in the 1951 World Series, the Giants' 16th NL pennant validated Stoneham and Durocher's efforts to revitalize the team on the field.

Mays started the Giants' first 34 games of 1952 before entering the military for Korean War service in late May; although he was hitting only .236 at the time, the team's record was 26–8, good for a 2½-game lead over Brooklyn in the NL race. With him out of the lineup through the 1953 season, the Dodgers took the next two pennants with relative ease.

Then, in 1954, Durocher, 21-game-winning hurler Johnny Antonelli (acquired by Stoneham from the Milwaukee Braves in a blockbuster pre-season trade), clutch pinch hitter Dusty Rhodes, and Mays—the league's MVP and batting champion (.345)—led the Giants to the National League pennant by five games over the Dodgers, and Stoneham's only World Series title. In the Fall Classic, they swept the heavily favored Cleveland Indians with four straight victories. In Game 1, center fielder Mays set the tone and preserved a late-game, 2–2 tie by flagging down Vic Wertz' 420 ft (130 m) drive to the Polo Grounds' right-center field wall in a spectacular play with his back to the infield, remembered as "the catch". Rhodes then won the game in the tenth inning with a pinch-hit, three-run homer. After the Giants captured the fifth World Series in their history, Stoneham was hailed as The Sporting News' Executive of the Year.

=== Final years in New York ===
The 1954 World Series title was the last hurrah for Stoneham and the Giants in New York. In 1955, the team barely finished above .500 (80–74) and lagged behind the Dodgers by 18½ games. Facing a rebuilding job, Durocher resigned on September 24; the parting was described as "amicable" but Stoneham and his abrasive manager were known to be at odds. Bill Rigney, who'd spent his MLB career in the Giants' organization, was promoted from Minneapolis to take over for 1956.

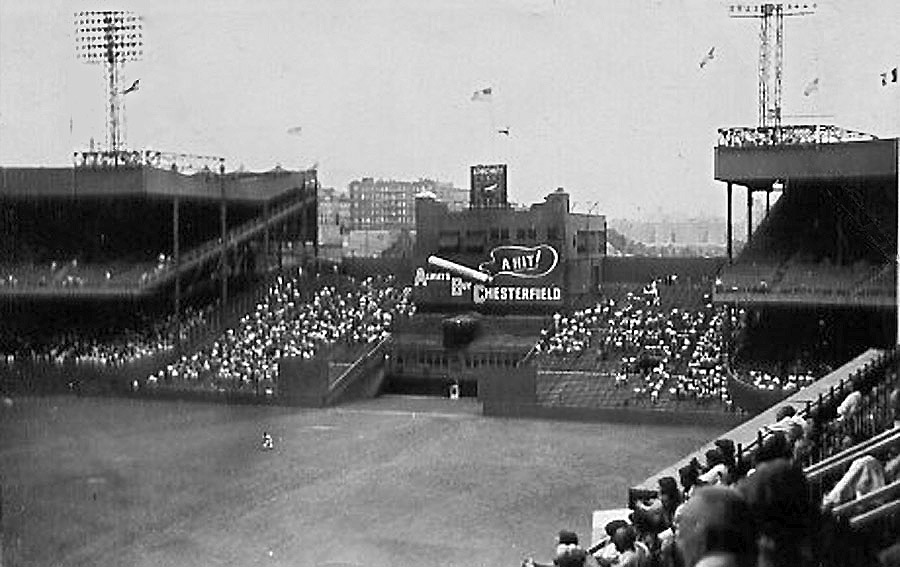
The Polo Grounds in 1952

Even more vexing, Stoneham was alarmed by a dramatic drop-off in attendance during the 1950s. The 1947 Giants had drawn 1.6 million paying fans despite finishing fourth. But the 1951 pennant winners and 1954 world champions struggled to hit seven figures in home attendance, and mediocre 1956–57 Giants' teams had drawn fewer than 700,000 customers each season. It did not help matters that the Polo Grounds was not aging gracefully. The stadium had been built in its present form in 1911, and had not been well maintained from the 1940s onward. Meanwhile, its surrounding neighbourhoods (in Washington Heights in Upper Manhattan) had entered a steep economic decline, with rising rates of crime. All of these factors contributed to the sharp drop in attendance.

The Giants' dwindling gates hit Stoneham particularly hard. Unlike most of his fellow owners, the Giants and the Polo Grounds were his sole source of income. Stoneham's balance sheet took a further hit after the 1955 season when the football Giants, who had spent their entire history as tenants of the baseball Giants, moved across the Harlem River to Yankee Stadium. With the loss of their football tenant, the baseball Giants' shrinking bottom line made it difficult for Stoneham to find the money needed for renovations even after laying off his maintenance staff. Even without that to consider, while the Giants owned the Polo Grounds, the land on which it stood was still owned by the heirs of James J. Coogan, who planned to build housing on the site.

In hopes of finding a way out, Stoneham briefly considered moving to the Bronx as tenants of the Yankees—possibly before his lease at the Polo Grounds ran out in 1962. Ironically, the Yanks had been tenants of the Giants at the Polo Grounds from 1913 to 1922. However, impressed by the success of the Braves after their 1953 shift from Boston to Milwaukee, Stoneham decided to move his Giants to the Twin Cities of Minnesota. He intended to set up shop in Metropolitan Stadium, which had just been constructed in Bloomington, halfway between Minneapolis and St. Paul, for his Triple-A farm team, the Minneapolis Millers. The stadium had been built to major league specifications with the help of public funds, and Stoneham had declared there were at most two big-league parks that were better. Under baseball rules of the time, the Giants shared the MLB rights to the Twin Cities with the Dodgers, who operated the Millers' main rival, the St. Paul Saints, as one of their three Triple-A affiliates.

Stoneham confided his plan to Dodgers owner Walter O'Malley, who then revealed that he was negotiating to transfer the Dodgers from Brooklyn to Los Angeles. He suggested that Stoneham contact San Francisco Mayor George Christopher and explore moving his team there to preserve the teams' bitter rivalry. Stoneham soon abandoned his Minnesota plan and shifted his attention, permanently, to San Francisco. In 1961, the Twin Cities succeeded in getting their own big-league team when the 1901–60 incarnation of the Washington Senators moved there and became the Minnesota Twins.

Stoneham and O'Malley were vilified by New York baseball fans when their teams' boards approved the moves to the West Coast. Stoneham was confronted by fans both angry—they chanted, after their last home game on September 29: "We want Stoneham! With a rope around his neck!"—and grief-stricken. During the August 19, 1957 press conference officially announcing the franchise's move to San Francisco, he explained, "Kids are still interested, but you don't see many of their parents at games." (In his book Five Seasons, Roger Angell quotes Stoneham as saying, "The last day we played [at the Polo Grounds], I couldn't go to the game. I just didn't want to see it all end.")

Writer Roger Kahn said years later, during promotional tours for his book The Era 1947–57, that the deteriorating condition of the Polo Grounds, as well as the Giants' shrinking fan base, made it necessary for Stoneham to abandon New York. He noted, however, that the Dodgers—a year removed from the 1956 pennant and two from Brooklyn's first world championship—were still profitable and O'Malley's move West was motivated by a desire for even greater riches.

== San Francisco Giants ==
=== Perennial contender and 1962 NL champion ===
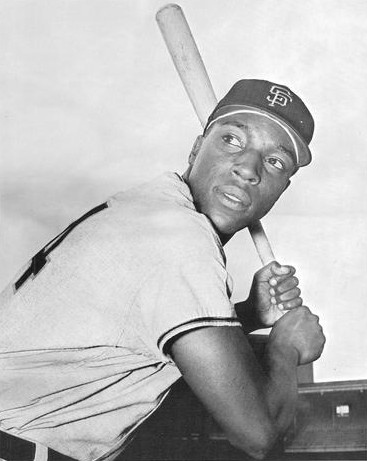
Willie McCovey (1961)

The Giants' transfer to San Francisco was initially a rousing success. The team began to play winning baseball and drew 1.27 and 1.42 million fans playing in a tiny (22,900 capacity) minor league ballpark, Seals Stadium, in 1958–59. Then the Giants moved to brand-new Candlestick Park in 1960 and attendance rose above 1.75 million fans. (Meanwhile, the National League returned to New York in 1962, with an expansion team, the Mets.)

The teams that San Francisco fans came to see were filled with dynamic young players from Carl Hubbell's farm system. The Giants of the late 1950s and 1960s were one of the most talented assemblages in the National League, including five Hall of Famers—Willie Mays, Willie McCovey, Juan Marichal, Orlando Cepeda and Gaylord Perry—and many other stars. The parade of young talent began in New York in 1956, with the debut of future eight-time All-Star and 7x Gold Glove Award-winning first baseman Bill White. In 1958 alone, the Giants introduced rookies Cepeda, Jim Davenport, Felipe Alou, Willie Kirkland and Leon Wagner; 1959 yielded McCovey; 1960 brought Matty Alou, Marichal and José Pagán; 1961 yielded Tom Haller; 1962, Gaylord Perry and Manny Mota. Then, throughout the rest of the 1960s, Stoneham's club would produce a dozen more prominent major-leaguers, including Bobby Bonds, Jim Ray Hart, Bill Hands, Randy Hundley, Tito Fuentes and George Foster. The Giants embraced the signing of African-American players, pioneered scouting in the Dominican Republic, and in 1964, brought the first Japanese player, Masanori Murakami, to the major leagues.

But Stoneham's San Francisco club could deliver only one pennant (in 1962), one National League West Division title (1971), and no World Series triumphs. The National League was so powerful and competitive—it had far outpaced the American League in signing Black and Latin players—the Giants had only one pennant to show for a decade-plus of contention. In 1962, they won 101 games and forced another best-of-three playoff with the Dodgers, then prevailed in the final inning of the decisive third game. In another echo of 1951, they were defeated by the Yankees in the World Series.

Stoneham was partially to blame for the Giants' lack of sustained dominance, as he squandered the resources of his productive farm system through a series of poorly advised trades, usually for starting pitchers who could complement Marichal and Perry. He also hired as his manager from 1961–64 Alvin Dark, who had a brilliant baseball mind but a poor relationship with at least some of his minority players. Dark was fired after the 1964 Giants fell just short in a wild, end-of-season pennant race; almost as notably, his dismissal came after he had made well-publicized and derogatory remarks to a Newsday reporter about Latin and Black ballplayers during the season. (Dark insisted that he was misquoted.) Long-time Durocher aide Herman Franks, Dark's successor, then produced four consecutive second-place finishes through 1968.

In 1971, Mays' final full season with San Francisco, the Giants roared to an early lead in the NL West, winning 37 of their first 51 games to build a 10½-game margin over the Dodgers through May 31. Then they fell to earth, going only 53–58 for the rest of the season. Still, they prevailed by a single game over Los Angeles to become division champions. In the 1971 National League Championship Series, however, the eventual world champion Pittsburgh Pirates handled Stoneham's club in four games.

=== Decline during the 1970s ===
After their initial success, Stoneham's Giants fell on hard times after 1971. The arrival of the cross-bay Oakland Athletics in 1968 split the market. The Athletics themselves struggled at the turnstiles, leading to doubts about whether the Bay Area was big enough for two MLB teams. Attendance at cold and windy Candlestick Park plummeted after 1971 to levels even below those at the Polo Grounds in the mid-1950s; during Stoneham's final five years as owner, only in 1973 did the Giants draw more than 648,000 fans, causing Stoneham financial hardship. This was the same situation that forced him to move to San Francisco almost 20 years earlier.

Finally, in 1976, he put the team up for sale. The Giants very nearly moved back east, to Toronto, when a deal with Canadian investors seemed imminent. In addition, it was briefly rumoured that they might return to the metropolitan New York area, perhaps to a new baseball stadium in the New Jersey Meadowlands. Instead, Stoneham sold it to San Francisco real estate magnate Bob Lurie and Phoenix, Arizona-based meat-packer Bud Herseth for $8 million, with the transaction unanimously approved by the other National League club owners on March 2, 1976. The deal represented a handsome return on his father's purchase of the team for $1 million 57 years earlier.

=== Property developer ===
In 1959, Stoneham began developing a spring training facility for the San Francisco Giants at Francisco Grande, in Casa Grande, Arizona. Francisco Grande hosted its first exhibition game in 1961, where Willie Mays hit a 375-foot home run in the fourth inning. Francisco Grande, now a hotel and golf resort, still houses various memorabilia of the San Francisco Giants of the 1960s.

== Personal life ==
Stoneham married his wife Valleda (née Pyke) on April 14, 1924. They had two children, son Charles Stoneham and a daughter also named Valleda. Stoneham died at age 86 in a nursing home in Scottsdale, Arizona. He was survived by his wife, son, daughter, five grandchildren and two great-grandchildren.
