= Robert Pinsky bibliography =

A list of the published work by or about American poet Robert Pinsky.

== Poetry ==
Collections

- Pinsky, Robert (1975). Sadness and happiness. Princeton, N.J.: Princeton UP.
- — (1979). An explanation of America. Princeton, N.J.: Princeton UP.
- — (1984). History of my heart. The Ecco Press.
- — (1990). The want bone. The Ecco Press.
- — (1996). The figured wheel : new and collected poems 1966–1996. Farrar, Straus and Giroux.
- — (2000). Jersey rain. Farrar, Straus and Giroux.
- — (2007). Gulf music. Farrar, Straus and Giroux.
- — (2011). Selected poems. Farrar, Straus and Giroux.
- — (2016). At the Foundling Hospital. Farrar, Straus and Giroux.
- — (2024). Proverbs of limbo. Farrar, Straus and Giroux.

Poems

Title	Year	First published	Reprinted/collected
The night game	1990	Pinsky, Robert (1990). "The night game". The want bone. Ecco Press. pp. 55–57.	The Figured Wheel, 1996
Food	2012	Pinsky, Robert (December 3, 2012). "Food". The New Yorker.	
Hand	2013	Pinsky, Robert (December 16, 2013). "Hand". The New Yorker. 89 (41): 45.	
Genesis according to George Segal	2014	Pinsky, Robert (December 15, 2014). "Genesis according to George Segal". The New Yorker. 90 (40): 62.	George Segal in black and white
Chorus	2015	Pinsky, Robert (February 9, 2015). "Chorus". The New Yorker. 90 (47): 55.	
Branca	2017	Pinsky, Robert (March 13, 2017). "Branca". The New Yorker. 93 (4): 64–65.	
At Mt. Auburn Cemetery	2021	Pinsky (March 29, 2021). "At Mt. Auburn Cemetery". The New Yorker. 97 (6): 58–59.	

Anthologies edited

- Pinsky, Robert, ed. (2019). The mind has cliffs of fall : poems at the extremes of feeling. New York: W. W. Norton.

== Prose ==
- Landor's Poetry (1968) University of Chicago Press
- The Situation of Poetry (1977) Princeton University Press
- Poetry and the World (1988) Ecco Press
- The Sounds of Poetry (1998) Farrar, Straus and Giroux
- Democracy, Culture, and the Voice of Poetry (2002) Princeton University Press
- The Life of David (2006) Schocken Books
- Thousands of Broadways: Dreams and Nightmares of the American Small Town (2009) University of Chicago Press

== Librettos ==
- Death and the Powers, an opera by Tod Machover (2010)
- Canto V (2007) a choral work with 3 or 4 voices and either piano or orchestra. Five excerpts from the Inferno of Dante. Collaborated with composer Ezra Laderman

== Interactive fiction ==
- Mindwheel (1984)

== As translator ==
- The Separate Notebooks by Czeslaw Milosz, with Renata Gorczynski and Robert Hass (1984)
- The Inferno of Dante: A New Verse Translation (1995)

== As editor ==
- Handbook of Heartbreak (1998)
- Americans' Favorite Poems: The Favorite Poem Project Anthology, with Maggie Dietz (1999)
- Poems to Read: A New Favorite Poem Project Anthology (2002)
- An Invitation to Poetry: A New Favorite Poem Project Anthology (2004)
- Essential Pleasures: A New Anthology of Poems to Read Aloud (2009)
- Singing School: Learning to Write (and Read) Poetry by Studying with the Masters (2014)

== CDs ==
- PoemJazz (2012) Circumstantial Productions
