= History of the San Francisco Giants =

The history of the San Francisco Giants begins in 1883 with the New York Gothams and has involved some of baseball's greatest players, including Willie Mays, Juan Marichal, Barry Bonds, and Gaylord Perry. The team has won three World Series titles and six National League (NL) pennants since moving to San Francisco.

== New York Giants history ==
From 1883 to 1957, the Giants franchise played games for New York City. During that time, the Giants won five of the franchise's eight World Series wins and 17 of its 23 National League pennants while playing most of its home games in the Polo Grounds in Upper Manhattan.

The Giants franchise was added by the National League in response to the 1882 formation of the American Association. Originally named the Gothams, they won consecutive National League pennants in 1888 and 1889 behind future Hall of Famers Tim Keefe, Mickey Welch, Roger Connor and Buck Ewing. From 1902 to 1931, the team was managed by John McGraw, who led them to 10 National League pennants and three World Series championships with many great players including Christy Mathewson, Joe McGinnity, Bill Terry, Jim Thorpe, Mel Ott, Casey Stengel, and Red Ames.

The post-McGraw Giants were punctuated by two famous moments, the Shot Heard 'Round the World (1951) by Bobby Thomson and The Catch by young superstar Willie Mays (1954). In the mid-1950s, the Polo Grounds was in disrepair, and the Giants began to contemplate a move from New York. The Brooklyn Dodgers were considering a move to Los Angeles but were told it would not be allowed unless a second team moved to California as well. As a result, the Giants agreed to move to San Francisco, and New York was left without a National League team until the New York Mets in 1962.

== 1958–present: San Francisco Giants ==
As with the New York years, the Giants' fortune in San Francisco has been mixed. Though recently the club has enjoyed sustained success, there have also been prolonged stretches of mediocrity along with two instances when the club's ownership threatened to move the team away from San Francisco.

=== 1958–1961: Seals Stadium and Candlestick Park ===
When the Giants moved to San Francisco, they played in Seals Stadium for their first two seasons. From 1931 to 1957, the stadium was the home of the Pacific Coast League San Francisco Seals, the AAA minor league affiliate of the Boston Red Sox. In 1958, first baseman Orlando Cepeda won Rookie of the Year honors. In 1959, Willie McCovey won the same award.

In 1960, the Giants moved to Candlestick Park, a stadium built on Candlestick Point in San Francisco's southeast corner overlooking San Francisco Bay. The new stadium quickly became known for its strong, swirling winds, cold temperatures, and thick evening fog that made for a formidable experience for brave fans and players, as well as its built-in radiant heating system which did not work. Candlestick's reputation was sealed in the ninth inning of the first 1961 All-Star Game when the winds picked up and a strong gust caused Giants relief pitcher Stu Miller to slip off the pitching rubber during his delivery, resulting in a balk, and a baseball legend that Miller was "blown off the mound".

=== 1962 World Series ===
In 1962, another memorable pennant chase with the Dodgers resulted in a second three-game tiebreaker between the two teams. The Giants again won by coming from behind with four runs in the ninth inning of Game 3. The Giants brought a World Series to San Francisco but lost 4–3 to the New York Yankees. Game 7 went to the bottom of the ninth inning, with the Yankees ahead 1–0. With Matty Alou on first base and two out, Willie Mays sliced a double down the right field line. Right fielder Roger Maris quickly got to the ball and rifled a throw to the infield preventing Alou from scoring the tying run and keeping him at third base. With Mays on second, well known for his speed, any base hit by the next batter, Willie McCovey would likely have won the series for the Giants. McCovey hit a line drive right at second baseman Bobby Richardson, who caught it after taking one step, ending the game and Series.

=== 1963–1984 ===
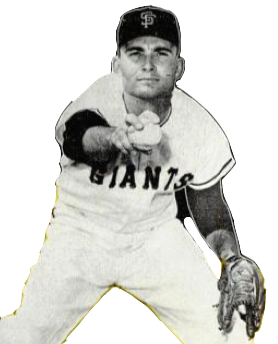
Giants pitcher Ron Herbel in a 1963 issue of Baseball Digest

Although the Giants did not play in another World Series until 1989, the teams of the 1960s continued to be pennant contenders thanks to several future Hall-of-Famers. These included Gaylord Perry, who pitched a no-hitter with the Giants in 1968; Juan Marichal, a pitcher with a memorable high-kicking delivery; McCovey, who won the National League MVP award in 1969, and Mays, who hit his 600th career home run in 1969. A Giants highlight came in 1963 when Jesús Alou joined the team, and along with Felipe and Matty, for one late inning of one game, formed the first all-brother outfield in major league history. In 1967, pitcher Mike McCormick became the first Giants Cy Young Award winner.

The Giants' next appearance in the postseason came in 1971. On the last day of the regular season, the Giants were nearing a historic collapse, having seen their lead in the National League West fall from 8 1/2 games to one game over the Los Angeles Dodgers. However, in their 162nd game, the Giants defeated the San Diego Padres to clinch the division. The Giants were defeated in the League Championship Series by the Pittsburgh Pirates.

During this decade, the Giants gave up many players who became successful elsewhere, including Garry Maddox, George Foster, Dave Kingman and Gaylord Perry. Two Giants became Rookies of the Year—outfielder Gary Matthews Sr. in 1973 and pitcher John Montefusco in 1975.

In 1976, in an 11th-hour deal, Bob Lurie bought the team, saving it from being moved to Toronto. Toronto was awarded an expansion team, the Blue Jays which began play the next year, but San Francisco baseball fans' worries about losing their beloved Giants had not completely gone away.

The rest of the 1970s was generally disappointing for the Giants, as they finished no higher than third place in any season. In 1978, thanks to young star slugger Jack Clark, veteran first baseman Willie McCovey, second baseman Bill Madlock, who was acquired from the Chicago Cubs, shortstops Johnnie LeMaster and Roger Metzger, and third baseman Darrell Evans, the Giants managed to finish the season above .500 with an 89–73 record. Veteran pitchers Vida Blue, John Montefusco, Ed Halicki, and Bob Knepper rounded out the starting rotation with Blue leading the way with 18 wins. The most memorable moment of that season occurred on May 28, 1978. With the Giants trailing 3–1 in the sixth inning, pinch hitter Mike Ivie hit a grand slam off of Dodgers ace Don Sutton before Candlestick Park's highest paid attendance of 58,545. They led the National League West for most of the season until the Los Angeles Dodgers got hot late to win the division.

In 1981, the Giants became the first National League team to hire a black manager, Frank Robinson, although he lasted fewer than four years and was generally unsuccessful. The Giants finished a game over .500 in the strike-shortened 1981 season. The next season, the Giants acquired veterans Joe Morgan and Reggie Smith, got hot late, and ended up in a three-team pennant race with the Dodgers and Braves. The day after the Dodgers eliminated them, Morgan hit a homer against the Dodgers on the last day of the season, giving the NL West to Atlanta.

=== 1985–1989: Humm-Baby ===
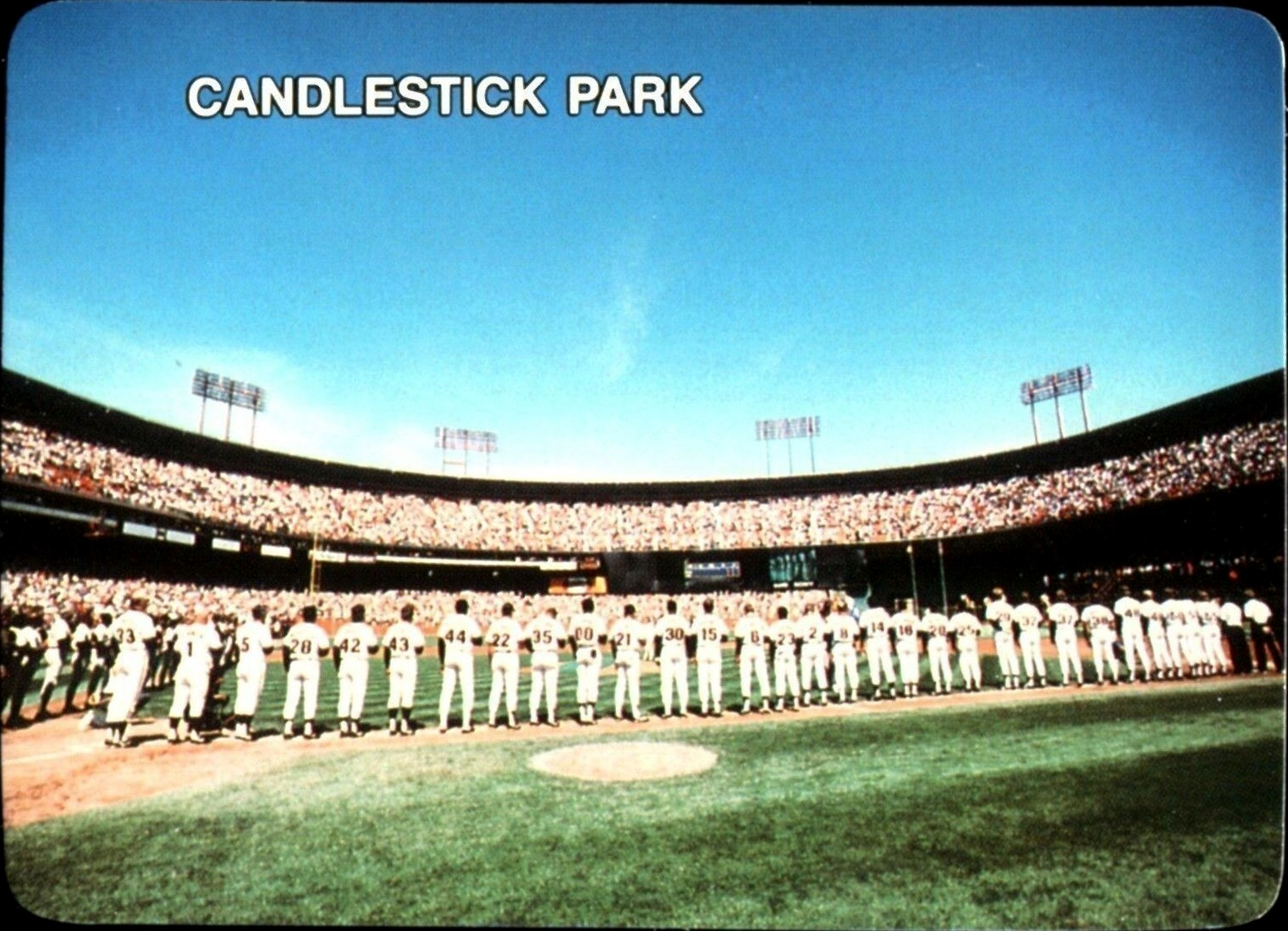
The 1987 Giants, pictured above at Candlestick, led the club to its first postseason appearance since 1971.

In 1985, owner Bob Lurie threatened to move the team out of the city of San Francisco to another location in the San Francisco Bay Area. Locations under consideration were Redwood City, San José, and Milpitas.

The 1985 Giants lost 100 games, the most in franchise history, under unsuccessful rookie manager Jim Davenport, and Lurie responded by hiring Al Rosen as general manager and Roger Craig as field manager. Rosen began in 1986 by bringing up promising rookies such as Will Clark and Robby Thompson and followed up in 1987 with trades for stars like Kevin Mitchell, Dave Dravecky, Candy Maldonado, and Rick Reuschel.

Craig managed the Giants from late 1985 to 1992. In his first five full seasons with the Giants, the team had winning records. The Giants won 83 games in 1986 and won the NL West Division title in 1987, losing the NLCS to the St. Louis Cardinals in seven games. The one bright spot in that defeat was their slugging outfielder Jeffrey Leonard, who was named the Most Valuable Player for the series in a losing effort. In Leonard's own faltering words, the prize money ($50,000) meant nothing to him, but only the win that eluded him and his team.

=== 1989: Will the "Thrill", World Series and the earthquake ===
Although the team used 15 different starting pitchers in the regular season, the 1989 Giants won the National League pennant. They were led by NL All-Star Game starting pitcher Rick Reuschel, NL ERA leader Scott Garrelts, NL Most Valuable Player Kevin Mitchell, and Will Clark.

The Giants beat the Chicago Cubs in the NLCS, 4–1. In Game 1, first baseman Will Clark hit a grand slam off Greg Maddux in the fourth inning after reading Maddux's lips telling his catcher which pitch he was going to throw. In Game 5, Clark, who was the series MVP for batting .650 with eight RBI, came through in the clutch with a bases-loaded, two-out single off hard-throwing lefty closer Mitch Williams to break a 1–1 tie in the bottom of the eighth inning. With two outs in the top of the 9th inning, Giants closer Steve Bedrosian gave up three straight singles and a run before getting Ryne Sandberg to hit a first-pitch groundout straight to Robby Thompson at second, who threw easily to Clark for the final out, stranding the tying run at second, as longtime Giants radio voice Hank Greenwald proclaimed, "27 years of waiting have come to an end. The Giants have won the pennant!"

The Giants faced their cross-Bay rivals, the Oakland Athletics in the unforgettable "Bay Bridge Series", best remembered by the October 17, 1989 Loma Prieta earthquake which struck at 5:04 p.m., just before the scheduled Game 3 at Candlestick Park. After a ten-day delay, Oakland finished its sweep of the Giants, winning Games 3 and 4 at San Francisco. The Giants never led in any of the games.

=== 1992: Farewell San Francisco? ===
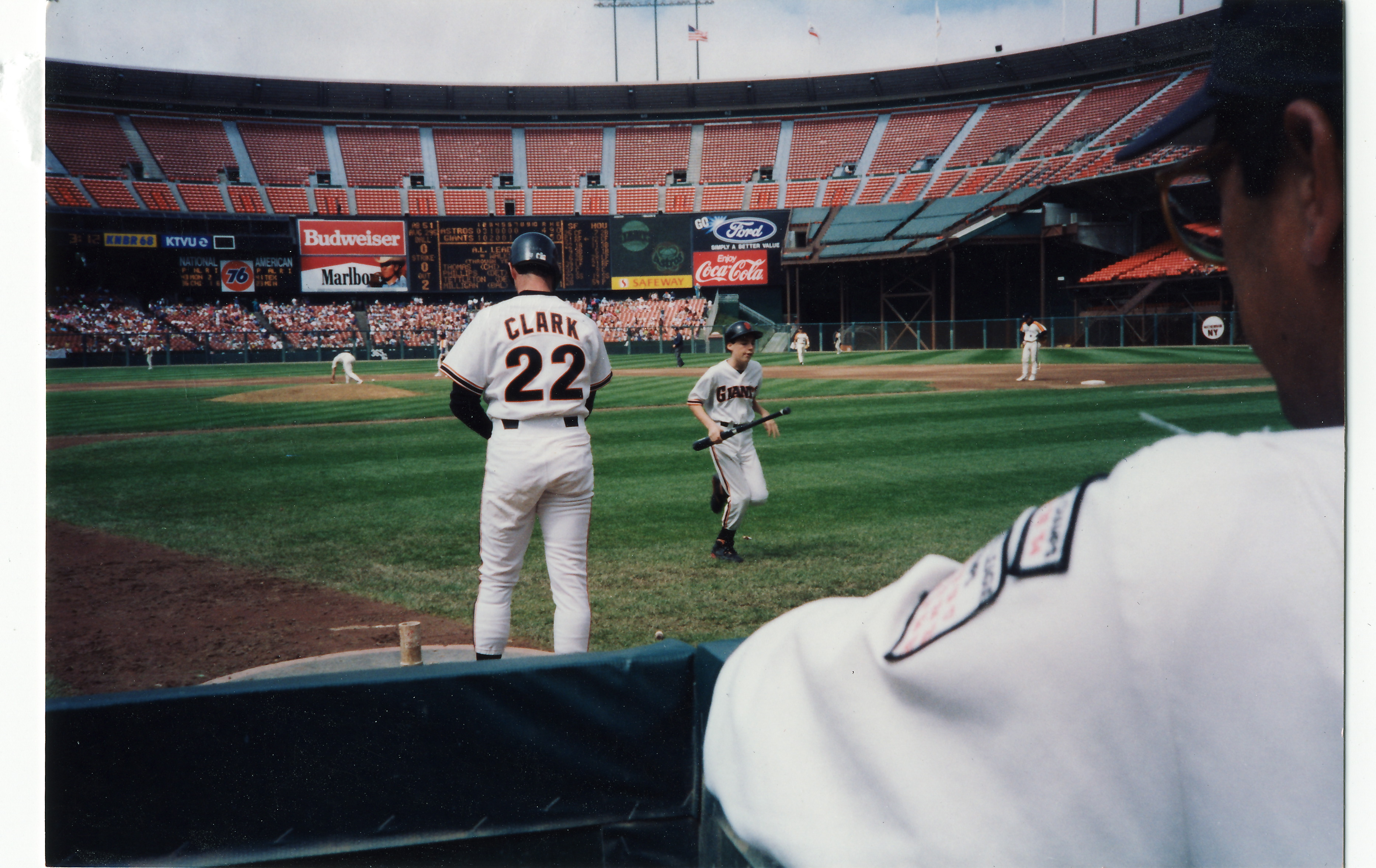
Will Clark preparing to bat for the Giants at Candlestick Park in 1992. That year, the Giants came close to relocation, with an empty stadium ready to be filled in Tampa.

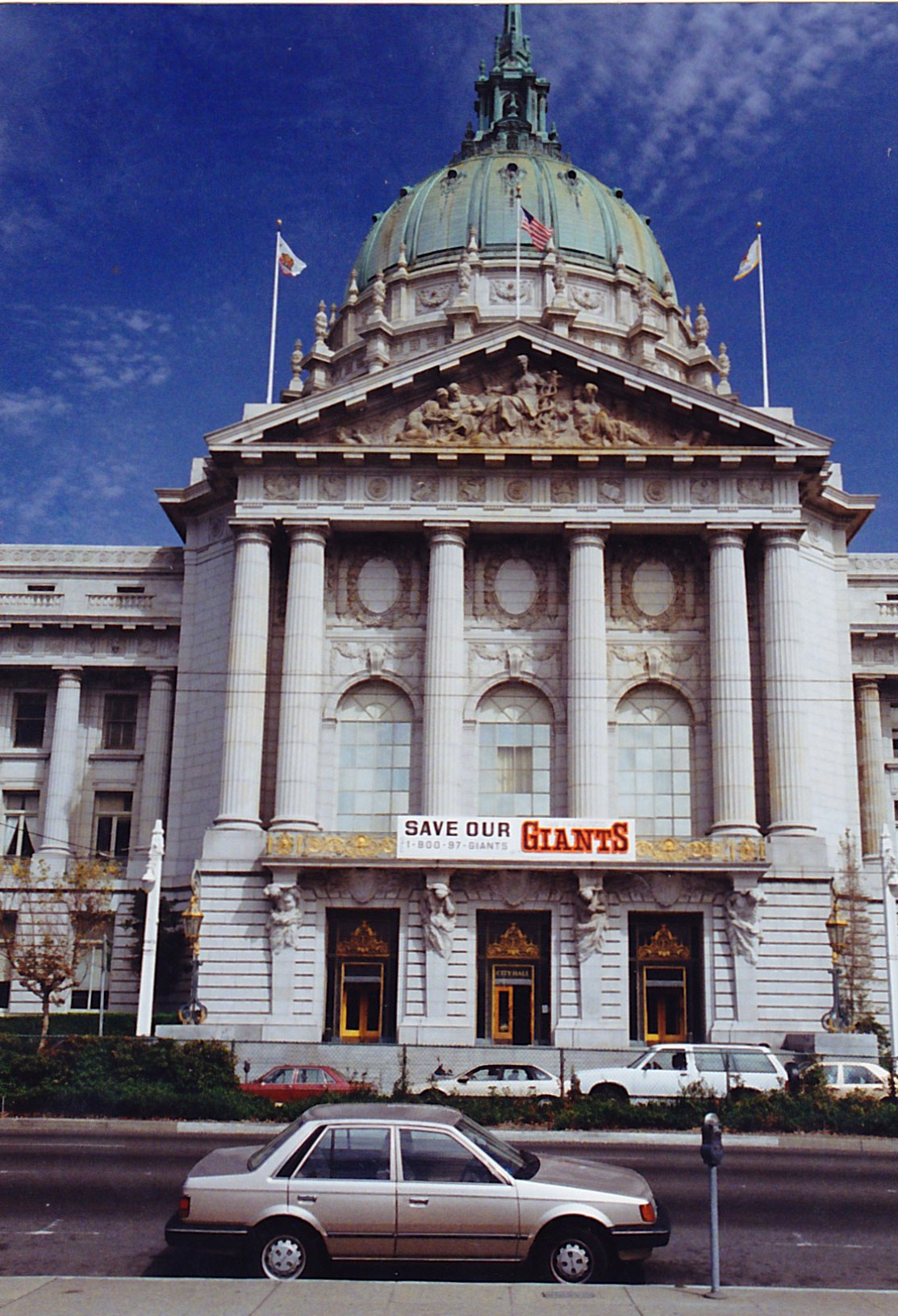
A "Save Our Giants" banner hanging from San Francisco City Hall

In the wake of the disappointing 1989 World Series sweep, a local ballot initiative to fund a new stadium in San Francisco failed, threatening the franchise's future in the city. After the 1992 season, owner Bob Lurie, who had previously saved the franchise from moving to Toronto in 1976, put the team up for sale. Robert E. Rich Jr. proposed buying the team and moving them to Pilot Field as the New York Giants of Buffalo, but adding seats to the park would have forced the club to miss the 1993 season, which Lurie found unacceptable. A group of investors from St. Petersburg led by Vince Naimoli reached an agreement to purchase the team and move them to the Tampa Bay area, but the National League owners voted against the acquisition. San Francisco mayor Frank Jordan made it a top priority to retain the team, and recruited local real estate billionaire Walter Shorenstein to help organize a local team of investors. Wally Haas, the owner of the Oakland Athletics at the time, agreed to grant the Giants exclusive rights to the South Bay so the Giants could explore all potential local sites for a new stadium and at least help to keep the team in the Bay Area. The team was instead sold in another last-minute deal to an ownership group including managing general partner Peter Magowan, former CEO of supermarket chain Safeway, and Harmon and Sue Burns. Six years later, St. Petersburg would get an MLB team via expansion when the Tampa Bay Devil Rays began play.

In addition to the anticipated move to downtown San Francisco, the Giants' ownership also made a major personnel move to solidify fan support. Before even hiring a new general manager or officially being approved as the new managing general partner, Magowan signed star free agent Barry Bonds away from the Pittsburgh Pirates, a move which was initially blocked by Major League Baseball until terms were negotiated to protect Lurie and Bonds in case the sale failed.

=== 1993: "The last pure pennant race" ===
The Barry Bonds era began auspiciously as Bonds put up the numbers for the third MVP of his career: 46 home runs, 129 runs, 123 RBI, .336 batting average, .458 on-base percentage, .677 slugging percentage. All exceeded his numbers from previous years with Pittsburgh. Matt Williams excelled as well (38 home runs, 110 RBI, .294 batting average), with veterans Robby Thompson and Will Clark, the latter in his last season with the Giants, providing additional offensive support. John Burkett and Bill Swift won more than 20 games apiece, and closer Rod Beck was dominant with 48 saves and a 2.16 ERA. All this led the Giants to a 103–59 record in Dusty Baker's first year as manager, which earned him the Manager of the Year award. But despite the Giants' great record, the Atlanta Braves—fueled by solid seasons from David Justice, Ron Gant, Deion Sanders and their key midseason acquisition of Fred McGriff—came back from a ten-game deficit to pass the Giants to win the NL West by a single game. The Braves also had two 20+-game winners, Tom Glavine and Cy Young Award-winning Greg Maddux.

Desperately needing a win against the Dodgers in the final game of the year to force a tiebreaker game with the Braves, the controversial choice of rookie pitcher Salomón Torres proved disastrous for the Giants as he gave up three runs in the first four innings of a 12–1 loss. The only other rested Giants starter, Scott Sanderson, was not chosen because he was considered a fly-ball pitcher and the Dodgers were a fly-ball-hitting team. After the major leagues' establishment of the three-division playoff format with a fourth wild card entry after the 1993 season, New York Times sports columnist Dave Anderson captured the feeling of many baseball purists regarding the thrilling—and for Giants fans, heartbreaking—winner-take-all outcome of the last two-division NL West when he characterized the 1993 National League regular season as "the last pure pennant race".

=== 1994–2007: The Barry Bonds era ===
The 1994 to 1996 seasons were not good for the Giants. The strike denied Matt Williams a chance to beat Roger Maris's single season home run record: He had 43 home runs in the Giants' first 115 games, and was thus on pace for 60, one short of Maris's record, when the strike hit with 47 games left to play. The rest of the team were not as offensively productive as their two sluggers, with no other player having even 10 home runs or even 40 RBI that late into the season although the Giants were still in contention, not far from the division lead, when the strike ended play in mid-August.

The Giants finished in last place in both 1995 and 1996. Barry Bonds continued as the Giants' driving force. Matt Williams and Glenallen Hill were the only other Giants with at least 20 home runs, while the rest of the team had mediocre offensive numbers.

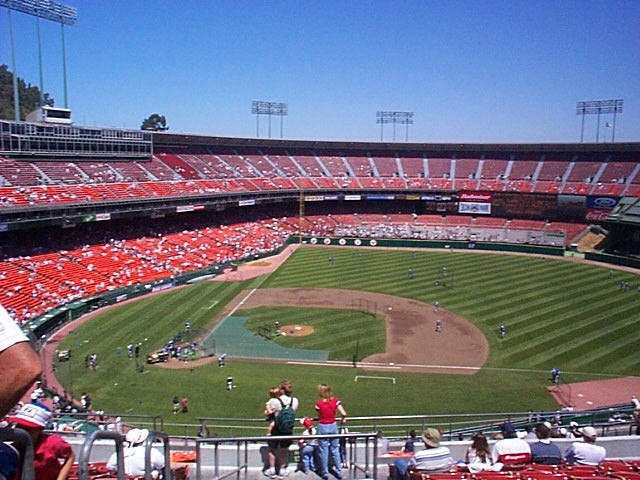
Candlestick Park

The 1996 was highlighted by Bonds's joining the 40–40 club as only the second member with 42 home runs and 40 stolen bases, along with 129 runs batted in, 151 walks, and a .308 batting average. Rookie Bill Mueller also provided hope for the future of the club with a .330 average, with 66 hits in 200 at-bats over 55 games. The pitching was scarcely better than in 1995. Only Mark Gardner had more than 10 wins, going 12–7 with a 4.42 earned run average, and Rod Beck had 35 saves and a 3.34 ERA but nine losses, and the rest of the bullpen was woeful. The low point came in late June when the Giants lost 10 straight games en route to a 68–94 record.

After three consecutive losing seasons, the Giants named Brian Sabean as their new general manager for 1997, replacing Bob Quinn. Sabean's tenure began with controversy. In his first official trade, he shocked Giants fans by trading Matt Williams to the Cleveland Indians for what newspapers referred to as a "bunch of spare parts", with a negative reaction great enough for him to explain publicly, "I didn't get to this point by being an idiot... I'm sitting here telling you there is a plan."

Sabean was proven right: The Giants' returns for Williams—second baseman Jeff Kent, shortstop José Vizcaíno, relief pitchers Julián Tavárez and Joe Roa, and $1 million in cash that enabled them to sign center fielder Darryl Hamilton—and a subsequent trade with the Anaheim Angels for first baseman J.T. Snow—turned out to be major contributors, leading the Giants to the National League West title in 1997. Snow, Kent, and Bonds each had over 100 RBI, and pitcher Shawn Estes's 19–5 record led the team. Rod Beck added 37 saves. The Giants' playoff run proved to be short, as they were swept by the Florida Marlins in the first round of the playoffs.

In 1998, the Giants were led by good seasons from sluggers Kent and Bonds, both with 30+ HR and 100+ RBI, and starting pitchers Rueter, Gardner, and newly acquired Orel Hershiser. New closer Robb Nen had 40 saves. A strong September allowed them to tie the Chicago Cubs after 162 games, but the Giants lost the tie-breaker game to the Cubs.

In 2000, after 40 years, the Giants left Candlestick Park and moved into a privately financed downtown stadium (Oracle Park, originally Pacific or "Pac" Bell Park, and later known as SBC Park and AT&T Park) on the part of the shoreline of China Basin known as McCovey Cove, at the corner of 3rd and King Streets (with an official address of 24 Willie Mays Plaza in honor of the longtime Giants superstar).

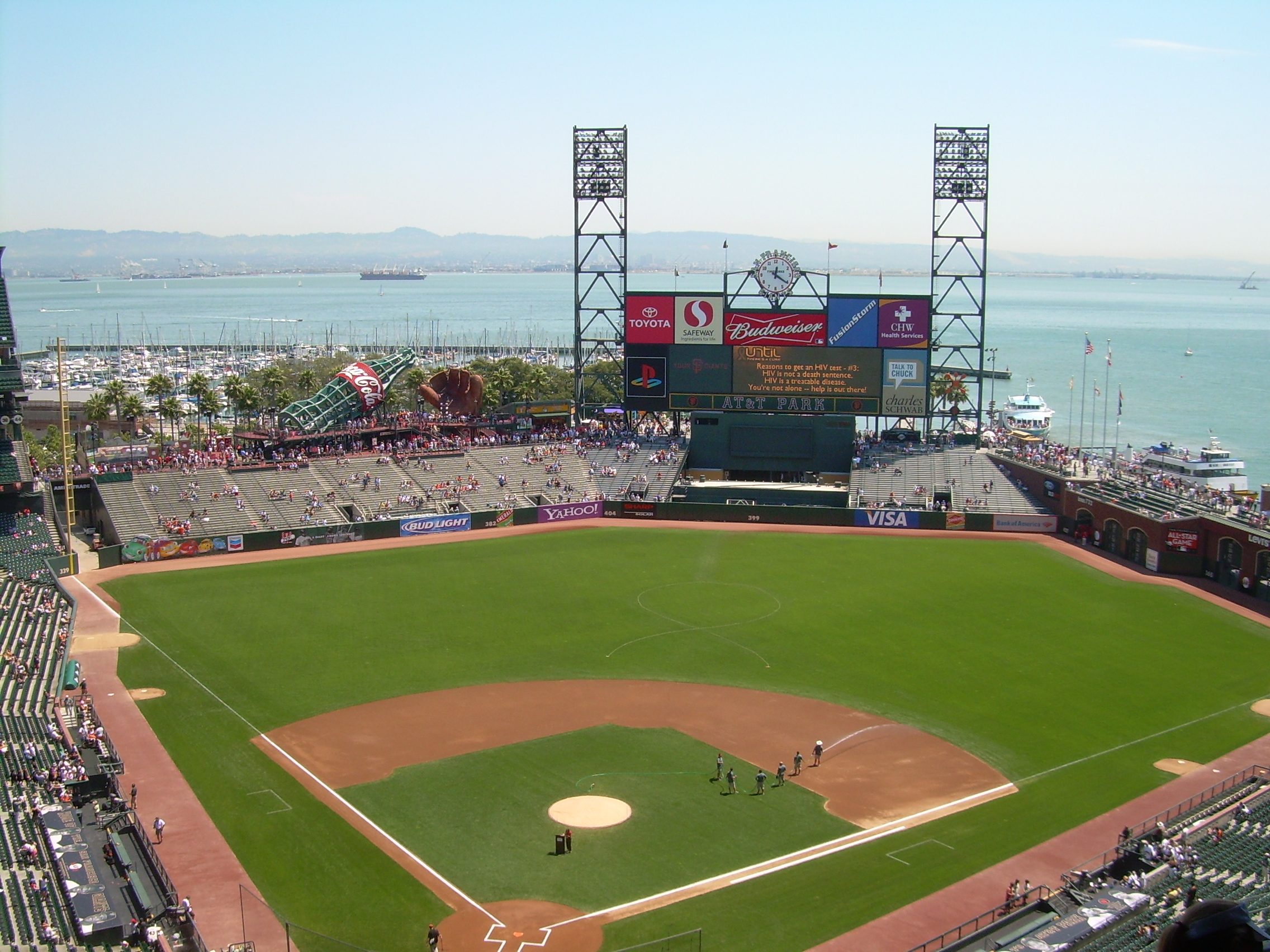
Oracle Park

The 2000 Giants not only won the NL West Division title but finished with the best record in MLB. Kent paced the attack with clutch hits (33 HR, 125 RBI) en route to being elected MVP over runner-up Bonds with 49 HR and 106 RBI. The pitching staff included five starters earning at least 10 wins, led by 17 from Liván Hernández. Closer Robb Nen was nearly perfect, with 41 saves and a 1.50 ERA. However, the Giants lost the NLDS division series to the New York Mets, 3–1. In 2001, the Giants were eliminated from playoff contention late in the season. Slugging shortstop Rich Aurilia put up stellar numbers (37 HR, 97 RBI, .324 BA) in support of Bonds, who once again gave fans something to cheer about with his single-season record 73 home runs, surpassing Mark McGwire's 70 in 1998.

In 2002, the Giants finished second in the NL West behind the Arizona Diamondbacks, bolstered by another MVP season for Bonds (46 HR, 110 RBI, .370 BA, a then-record 198 walks, and a .582 OBP) and Kent (37 HR, 108 RBI, and .313 BA). Additional roster support was provided by decent seasons from catcher Benito Santiago and shortstop Aurilia, aided by new acquisitions third baseman David Bell, outfielder Reggie Sanders, and outfielder Tsuyoshi Shinjo, (generally known by last name only), who spent only one season with the Giants before returning to Japan. The pitching staff again proved solid, with five starters winning 12 or more including Jason Schmidt in his first full season in San Francisco. Closer Robb Nen had 43 saves and a 2.20 ERA, and Félix Rodríguez and Tim Worrell were solid out of the bullpen.

The Giants made the playoffs as the NL wild card in the last weekend of the season. They began by defeating the Atlanta Braves in the NLDS 3–2, with starter Russ Ortíz winning Games 1 and 5 in Atlanta. Snow ended the deciding game by starting a double play with the tying runs on base in the bottom of the 9th. In the NLCS, they defeated the St. Louis Cardinals 4–1. Santiago, particularly for his late game-winning home run in Game 4, was elected MVP of the NLCS.

The Giants then faced the American League champion Anaheim Angels in the World Series. The Giants split the first two games in Anaheim, were beaten 10–4 by the visiting Angels in Game 3, then won Games 4 and 5 in Pac Bell Park, 4–3 and 16–4 respectively. The Series shifted back to Anaheim for Game 6. With the Giants leading the Series 3–2 and leading 5–0 with one out in the bottom of the seventh inning, manager Dusty Baker removed Ortíz after he gave up two straight singles and handed him what Baker hoped would be the "game ball" as he walked off the mound. Moments later, after fouling off numerous fastballs, the Angels' Scott Spiezio hit a three-run home run off reliever Félix Rodríguez. The Giants' closer Robb Nen, pitching with an injured right shoulder, gave up an eighth-inning two-run double to Troy Glaus, who was the Most Valuable Player for the series, and the Angels won the game 6–5 and captured the momentum in the Series. The following night, Anaheim won 4–1 to claim the Series.

After 2002, the Giants went through many personnel changes. Baker's managerial contract was not renewed after ten seasons, and he left to manage the Chicago Cubs. In addition, Gene Clines, Sonny Jackson, and Juan López all left the Giants and joined Baker in Chicago. Nen's damaged shoulder ended his career, forcing him into early retirement; and Kent, moving onto the Houston Astros, was not re-signed. He had aroused Giants front office ire earlier in the season with an off-field injury during spring training in which he broke his wrist after claiming that he had slipped and fallen off the roof of his vehicle while washing it. It later was discovered that he had lied and that, in reality, he had accidentally crashed his motorcycle while performing wheelies and other stunts, violating his contract. He had also gotten into a fight with Bonds in the dugout during a game against the San Diego Padres, which was caught on tape, and in which other teammates intervened to separate the two. Position players David Bell, Reggie Sanders, Tsuyoshi Shinjo, and Kenny Lofton, as well as pitchers Liván Hernández, Russ Ortiz, and Aaron Fultz, all went to other teams in 2003 as well.

In 2003, the Giants, under new manager Felipe Alou, won 100 games for the seventh time in franchise history, winning their division for the third time in seven seasons and spending every day of the season in first place, the ninth team to accomplish that feat in baseball history. Their offense was paced by yet another MVP season from Bonds (45 HR, 90 RBI, .341 BA, 148 BB and an OBP of .529). The pitching staff was led by Jason Schmidt (17–5, 2.34 ERA) and Kirk Rueter (10–5, 4.53) but dropped off after that, with no other starter earning ten wins.

Once again in the playoffs, the Giants faced the eventual-world-champion Florida Marlins in the NLDS. Schmidt won Game 1 in San Francisco with a low-scoring complete game out-dueling Josh Beckett; but the Marlins won the next three games, and the series three games to one, as the Giants bullpen faltered after Game 2 starter Sidney Ponson imploded, blowing a big early Giants lead. As usually reliable outfielder Fred Snodgrass blew the deciding game of the 1912 World Series on the road with the Giants one run ahead going into the last of the tenth with a notorious "muff" of a fly ball by the leadoff hitter ending with the home team Boston Red Sox scoring two runs for a come-from-behind walk-off win, exactly the same scenario happened in the last of the tenth in Florida in Game 3 of the 2003 NLDS with a muff of another easy leadoff fly ball by otherwise slick-fielding José Cruz Jr., ending with Iván Rodríguez's two-out, two-run, come-from-behind bases-loaded walk-off win for the Marlins off closer Tim Worrell.

In 2004, Bonds broke his own records with 232 walks and a .609 OBP en route to his seventh and last NL MVP award. After sitting out most of the first half of the season with an injury, Snow led the league in hitting after the All-Star Break. The Giants' 2005 season was the least successful of the decade. Bonds missed almost the entire season with a knee injury, closer Armando Benítez was injured for four months, and ace Jason Schmidt struggled after numerous injuries. On July 14, 2005, the franchise won its 10,000th game, defeating the rival Dodgers, 4–3. The Giants became the first professional sports franchise to have a five-figure win total. However, the Giants finished 75–87, their first losing season since 1996. Despite the disappointing finish, the Giants extended Alou's contract for another year.

The Giants were expected to contend in 2006 with a strong roster. Despite a losing streak in May, and the worst batting performance by Bonds in about 15 years, the Giants did contend in the less-than-stellar NL West and by July 23 were in first place. A 3–16 stretch ensued, with nine one-run losses, and combined with a season-ending eight losses in nine games, the team finished in third place with a 76–85 record. After the season, the Giants announced that they would not renew manager Felipe Alou's contract but still offer him the opportunity to stay with them in an advisory role to the general manager and to baseball operations.

With 11 free agents (excluding Jason Schmidt who signed with the Dodgers for roughly $15 million a year), a new manager on board (Bruce Bochy, division rival San Diego manager since the mid-1990s who left the Padres to manage the Giants), and the loss of veteran catcher Mike Matheny due to complications (cumulative trauma) resulting from concussions sustained during his career, the Giants' prospects for the 2007 season were less than favorable as 2006 came to an end. They then made several deals, re-signing infielders Pedro Feliz, Ray Durham and longtime fan favorite Rich Aurilia, and picking up catcher Bengie Molina, slugger Ryan Klesko and outfielder Dave Roberts. They also signed free-agent pitcher Barry Zito to a lucrative seven-year contract worth $126 million with an $18 million option for an eighth year, the richest pitcher's contract in baseball history at the time. On January 9, 2007, they re-signed pitcher Russ Ortiz to compete for the fifth starting position in spring training, which he won by late March due to his outstanding spring.

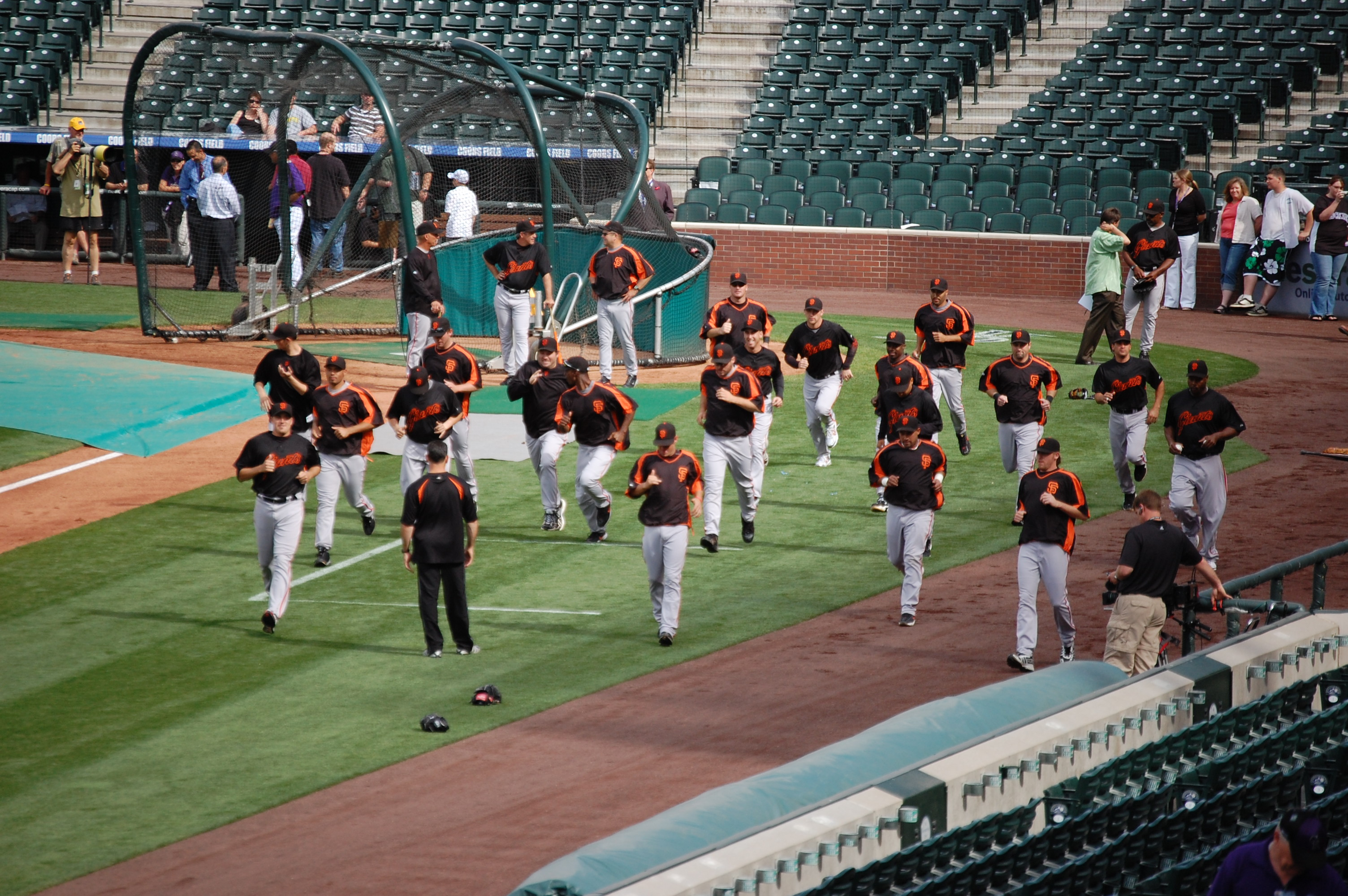
The 2007 team during spring training

They got off to a slow start in the regular season, with spurts of promise but more often stretches of mediocre play at best. Pitching was often inconsistent or the offense nonexistent (such as in a pair of 1–0 losses for young star starter Matt Cain, for whom lack of run support was a frequent problem).

The 2007 season was highlighted by Bonds breaking Hank Aaron's record for career home runs. Leading off the top of the second before a sellout crowd against the Padres on August 4, Bonds hit a high fastball off the facing of the upper deck in left field for a home run to tie Aaron at 755 home runs. In the bottom of the fifth at home against the Washington Nationals on August 7, Bonds hit number 756 into the center field bleachers, causing a melee in the crowd scrambling for the ball, which later earned six figures at auction for the young man who came up with it. Aaron, appearing on the big screen, congratulated Bonds personally.

The 2007 season continued to be discouraging for the Giants, with solid pitching but often without run support. Rookie starter Tim Lincecum, for instance, held the Chicago Cubs to two hits through eight innings on August 21, but the team scored only one run in a 5–1 loss.

On September 22, 2007, the Giants officially announced they would not re-sign Bonds for the 2008 season. After much speculation and debate, owner Peter Magowan announced Bonds' departure at a press conference, stressing the need for youth and offense throughout the lineup. Bonds played the last game of his career on September 26, 2007.

=== 2008–2009: Rebuilding ===
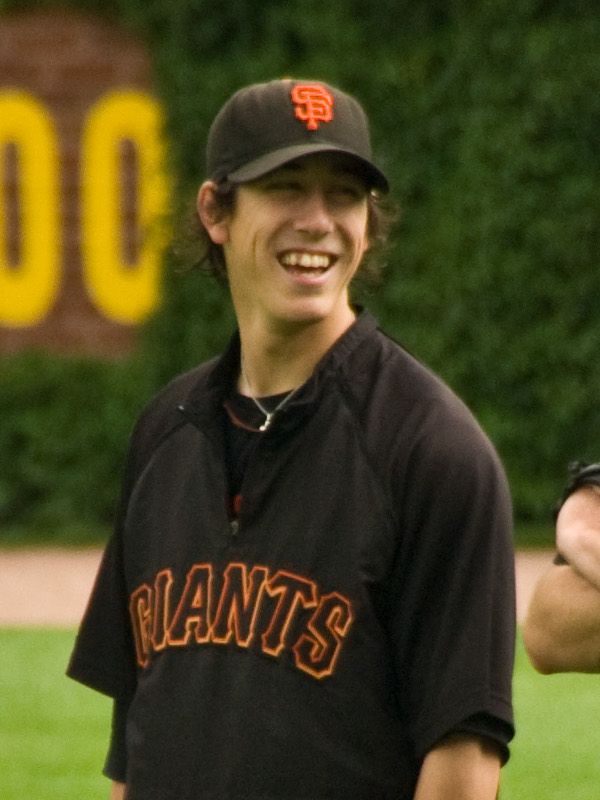
Tim Lincecum, 2008 Cy Young Award Winner

The 2008 season marked the Giants' first without Barry Bonds since 1992. Their first big move was to sign former Philadelphia Phillies center fielder Aaron Rowand to a 5-year deal. Barry Zito, in his second year as a Giant, once again got off to a poor start, losing his first eight decisions; but the team found hope with Tim Lincecum in his first full season. After going 7–5 as a rookie in 2007, he won four straight before his first loss on April 29. Lincecum was selected to the 2008 MLB All-Star Game but could not pitch due to injury. He soon recovered, however, and even went on to win the 2008 NL Cy Young Award, finishing at 18–5 and becoming the first Giant to win the award since Mike McCormick in 1967. The Giants finished the season in fourth place in the NL West with a record of 72–90.

During the 2008–09 off-season, the Giants strengthened their pitching staff with veteran starting pitcher Randy Johnson and relievers Bob Howry and Jeremy Affeldt. They also signed infielders Édgar Rentería and Juan Uribe. Bill Neukom also became the new managing partner. Despite lingering questions about their struggling offense, they were 49–39 by the All-Star Break, good enough for second place in the NL West.

In addition to the Giants' overall performance as a team, the first half of 2009 was memorable for several individuals: Johnson became the 24th major league pitcher to win 300 games, and young starter Jonathan Sánchez tossed a nearly perfect no-hitter on July 10 (the only baserunner reached on Juan Uribe's late infield error.), the first Giants no-hitter since 1976. Incredibly, Sánchez accomplished his feat spot-starting in place of injured Randy Johnson and returning to the rotation after a brief demotion to the bullpen, striking out a career-high 11 hitters to boot. It was his first major league complete game and shutout, on only 110 pitches for an 8–0 Giants romp, and the first no-hitter thrown at AT&T Park. In fact, 2009's starting rotation was one of the strongest in Giants history, two of whom went to the All-Star Game including successfully defending Cy Young champ Tim Lincecum, who started the game. He won his second straight NL Cy Young Award even though he won only 15 games in 2009, finishing at 15–7, becoming the only pitcher to capture the Cy Young Award in each of his first two full major league seasons.

On July 20, the Giants traded one of their top prospects, AA pitcher Tim Alderson, for Pittsburgh Pirates second baseman Freddy Sánchez. Alderson was the first round pick in the 2007 draft and was ranked prospect number four in the Giants' organization by Baseball America, but Sánchez provided a much-needed jump for their offense, batting .293 with 41 RBI and 22 walks for the season. On September 11, the Giants added another key player when they brought up their first-round draft pick, catcher Buster Posey, from AAA. Although the 2009 Giants finished only 14 games above .500, they won 16 more games than in 2008. With the emergence of star slugger Pablo Sandoval to provide solid offensive support for their dominant pitching staff, they looked forward to making the playoffs next year for the first time since 2003.

=== 2010–2016: San Francisco dynasty ===
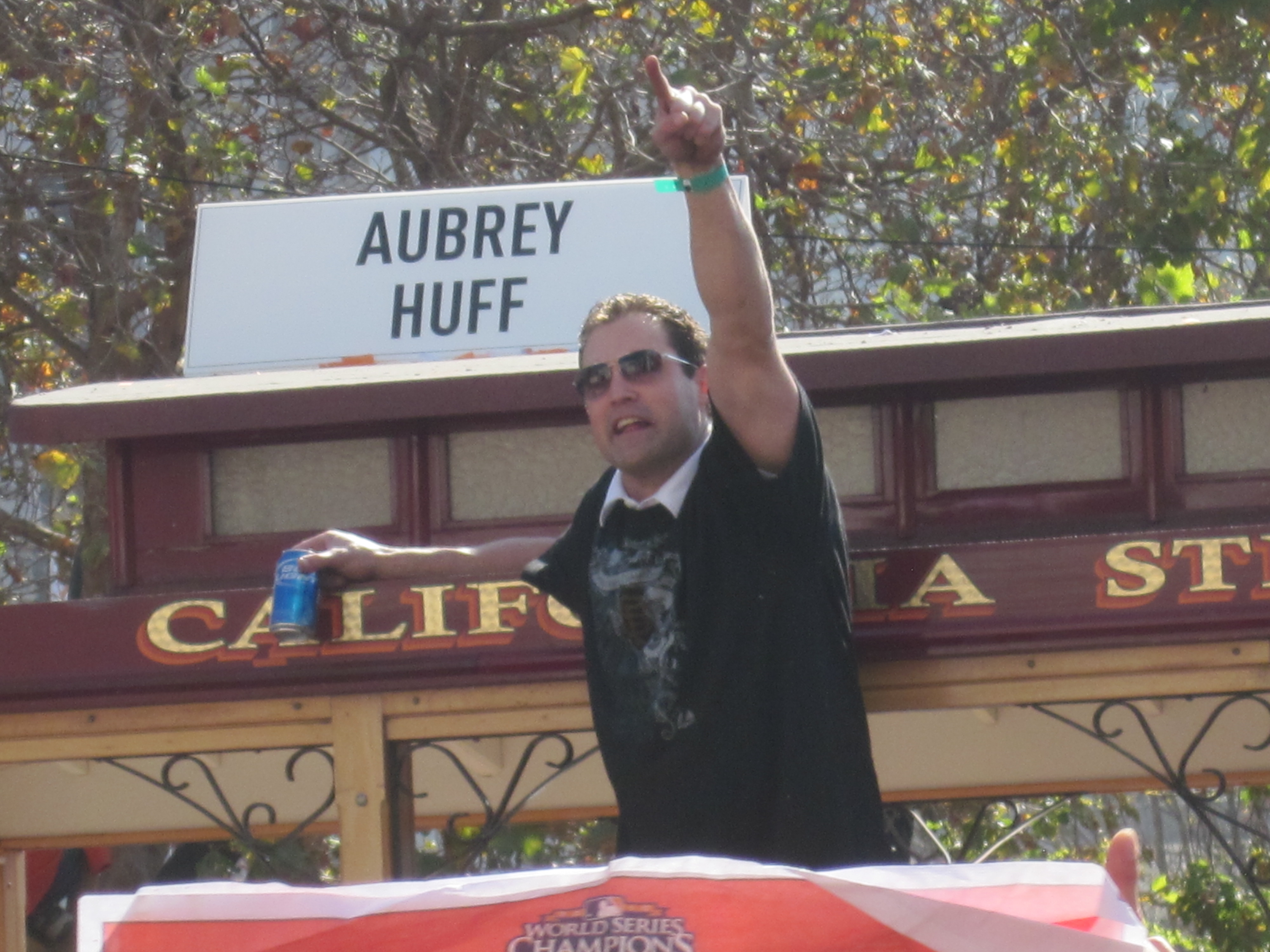
Pat Burrell in the Giants' 2010 World Series victory parade

At the start of the 2010 season, most baseball experts did not expect the Giants to make the playoffs.

The Giants won the NL West for the first time since 2003, after trailing the San Diego Padres for most of the season. In the NLDS, the Giants defeated the Atlanta Braves 3–1. The Giants followed that up with a 4–2 win over the Philadelphia Phillies in the NLCS.

Behind Tim Lincecum, the Giants wrapped up the 2010 World Series over the Texas Rangers with a 3–1 Game 5 win for their first World Series championship since 1954 and first since moving to San Francisco. Édgar Rentería was named World Series Most Valuable Player. Catcher Buster Posey was named NL Rookie of the Year.

On May 25, 2011, Marlins infielder Scott Cousins aggressively slid into Posey to score a run, fracturing Posey's ankle and ending his season. The Giants fought on without Posey and through several other injuries to position players, largely on the strength of their pitching staff. Four starters, Tim Lincecum (2.74 ERA), Matt Cain (2.88 ERA), Ryan Vogelsong (2.71 ERA) and Madison Bumgarner (3.21 ERA), and their bullpen kept the Giants in first place until mid-August. San Francisco finished the season with an 86–76 record in second place in the NL West, eight games behind the division-winning Arizona Diamondbacks.

The Giants started the 2012 season playing barely above .500, trailing the Los Angeles Dodgers for most of the first half of the season. But a 17–10 June record by the Giants (including a home sweep of the Dodgers), while the Dodgers slumped to 11–17, put the Giants as division leaders at the end of the month. On June 13, Matt Cain pitched the first perfect game in the 130-year history of the franchise, against the Houston Astros. The Giants and Dodgers continued to trade places at the top until August 20, at which point another sweep of the Dodgers gave the Giants the lead for good.

Outfielder Melky Cabrera was named the MVP of the All-Star Game, while Cain was the starting and winning pitcher. At the trade deadline, the Giants acquired right fielder Hunter Pence from the Philadelphia Phillies and second baseman Marco Scutaro from the Colorado Rockies. On August 15, Cabrera was suspended for 50 games for testing positive for a performance-enhancing drug. Despite the loss of Cabrera and the Dodgers making several big trades, the Giants still won the 2012 NL West Division, led by Scútaro's 20-game hit streak in the last 20 games of the regular season and NL MVP-to-be Buster Posey's league-leading .336.

In the NLDS, the Giants became the first NL team to come back from a 2–0 deficit to beat the Cincinnati Reds in three straight games. The St. Louis Cardinals won three out of the first four games in the NLCS. The Giants won the next three games to advance to the 2012 World Series, and Scutaro was chosen MVP of the NLCS with his .500 average. The Giants finished a 4–0 sweep over the Detroit Tigers in the World Series. Pablo Sandoval, who hit home runs in his first three at-bats in Game 1, and had a .500 average in the World Series, was named the World Series MVP.

Early in 2013, the Giants were in first place in the NL West. However, in May, the Giants began a slide into last place. They struggled both offensively and defensively due to several injuries throughout the season, most notably Ángel Pagán, who suffered a hamstring injury mid-season and was out for 12 weeks. Buster Posey, who had won the previous year's National League batting title, experienced a significant drop-off, hitting just 15 home runs (and just two in the second half of the season) and slumping to a .294 average. Although the Giants won the season series over every team in their own division, including going 11–8 over the rival Dodgers who won the division, they went only 32–54 outside of their division. This slide lasted until mid-August when the Giants began to play efficiently again (highlighted by a 19–3 win over the rival Dodgers in Los Angeles) and ended the season in third place after a brief resurgence. The Giants finished the 2013 season with a 76–86 record. The Giants' .469 record marked the second worst records ever for a team that had won the World Series the previous year, besting only the 1998 Florida Marlins. One notable highlight was Tim Lincecum throwing his first no-hitter against the San Diego Padres.

The Giants acquired outfielder Michael Morse and starting pitcher Tim Hudson in the offseason. At one point, the Giants had twice as many wins as they had losses, sporting a 42–21 record. However, their 9.5 game lead over the Dodgers dissipated. Lincecum pitched his second no-hitter, also against the Padres. With a win–loss record of 12–9, Lincecum achieved more wins than his previous two seasons, though second-half struggles put Lincecum out of the starting rotation.

The Giants finished the season with an 88–74 record. The Giants defeated the Pirates in the 2014 National League Wild Card Game, with Madison Bumgarner pitching a complete game shutout and Brandon Crawford hitting a grand slam off of Pirates starter Edinson Vólquez. The Giants won the NLDS, defeating the Washington Nationals and passing the Cincinnati Reds' Big Red Machine for a new National League record in consecutive postseason victories. The Giants played the Cardinals in the NLCS, winning in five games. Travis Ishikawa hit a game winning walk-off 3-run homer in Game 5. Madison Bumgarner was named MVP of the series after starting 2 games, giving up only 3 runs in 15 and 2/3 innings while striking out 12. The Giants faced the Kansas City Royals in the 2014 World Series, defeating the AL Champions 4–3. Madison Bumgarner was also named the World Series MVP, starting 2 games in the series as well as appearing in relief for 5 innings to finish off game 7. Bumgarner had a 0.43 ERA in the 2014 World Series, contributing to a lifetime World Series ERA of 0.25. The championship was the Giants' third in a five-year span, spurring debate over whether the Giants could be considered a modern-day baseball dynasty.

During the 2015 offseason, the Giants lost two key contributors, Pablo Sandoval and Michael Morse, to free agency who signed with the Boston Red Sox and the Miami Marlins respectively. After Sandoval's departure, there was talk of moving Posey to third base. Marco Scutaro, the Giants' injury-plagued second baseman, was also released, with Joe Panik taking his position. Over the offseason, Giants traded for Casey McGehee and Nori Aoki to replace Sandoval and Morse respectively, avoided arbitration with Brandon Belt and Brandon Crawford, re-signed Sergio Romo and Jake Peavy, re-signed Ryan Vogelsong, and looked forward to the returns of Matt Cain and Ángel Pagán. Despite the team remaining mostly the same, some concerns existed. The rotation was one of the oldest in the major leagues. Many believed McGehee and Aoki could not make up for the power lost from the departures of Sandoval and Morse. However, the Giants remained in high hopes entering 2015, looking to break the odd-year "curse" established in 2011 and 2013.

Indeed, the 2015 season began poorly for the team, and included an eight-game losing streak. However, a home sweep of the archrival Dodgers lifted the Giants' outlook, and an additional sweep of the Los Angeles Angels in the opening days of May, with Lincecum winning the final game of the series, further improved their prospects. By mid-May, the team welcomed Hunter Pence, who had broken his arm in spring training, back to the lineup, with a fine debut performance in a lopsided win in Cincinnati. The victory gave the Giants a winning record and another boost to their morale. On June 9, 2015, Chris Heston pitched the 17th no-hitter in Giants history against the New York Mets, making 110 pitches, striking out 11 including three called strikeouts in the ninth inning, with the only baserunners being three hit batsmen. Heston also had two hits and drove in two runs in the game. The no-hitter was the third by a Giants rookie and the first by a visiting pitcher at Citi Field.

On June 15, the Giants set a record for most consecutive home losses at AT&T Park at nine straight games. This losing streak was the Giants' longest since an 11-game home losing streak at the Polo Grounds in New York in 1940.

Despite injuries to Aoki, Pagán, Pence, Panik, and Leake, the Giants remained deep in the playoff hunt, due to contributions by rookies Chris Heston and Matt Duffy, as well as Posey's MVP-like season. However, with Pence out again with an oblique strain in the middle of a brutal stretch in the schedule, the Giants faced a major uphill battle. They acquired outfielder Marlon Byrd to deal with Pagán and Pence's absences; he made an immediate impact, almost hitting for the cycle in a 6–4 win against the Wild Card-leading Pirates. However, the Giants still finished 84–78 and missed the playoffs.

In 2016, the Giants started off strong, ending their first half at the All-Star break with the best record in MLB at 57–33. However, due to a struggling bullpen in the second half, they just barely qualified for the 2016 postseason in the second NL Wild Card spot. In the process, they blew an 8-game lead to the rival Los Angeles Dodgers. The Giants' run at even-year championships ended with a Game 4 loss to the eventual World Series champion Chicago Cubs in the NLDS. In Game 4, the Giants led 5–2 before they were eliminated after allowing four runs to the "Amazin' Cubs" in the ninth inning. They previously held an MLB-record 10-game winning streak when facing elimination in the postseason. Brandon Crawford, Joe Panik, and Buster Posey all received Gold Glove awards at the close of the season.

=== 2017–2024: Zaidi takes over ===
On December 6, 2016, the Giants signed closer Mark Melancon to a four-year contract. On April 2, 2017, Madison Bumgarner became the first pitcher in MLB history to hit two home runs in an Opening Day matchup. Despite the Giants' recent post-season successes and posting the seventh highest payroll in the league in 2017, they finished 64–98 and fifth in the NL West in a season that was rife with injuries to several key players. This, combined with the failure of the front office to address glaring defensive issues in the outfield, as well as the lowest power-hitting performance in the league at a time when home runs are on the rise, resulted in one of the poorest seasons in Giants history.

Before the 2018 season, the Giants acquired Evan Longoria and Andrew McCutchen in trades that saw Denard Span and the organization's top prospect Christian Arroyo sent to the Tampa Bay Rays in return, along with an additional prospect; the Pittsburgh Pirates received Giants prospects Kyle Crick and Bryan Reynolds as compensation for the final year of McCutchen's contract. The team followed these trades by signing free-agent outfielder Austin Jackson to a two-year contract. The season, despite moves to compete, ended in a 73–89 record for the Giants, 4th in the NL West. On July 8, Jackson was sent to the Texas Rangers along with pitchers Cory Gearrin and Jason Bahr. On August 31, just before the end of the waiver trade deadline, McCutchen was traded to the New York Yankees for minor leaguers Abiatal Avelino and Juan De Paula. Also in late August, Posey underwent season-ending hip surgery, which caused the Giants to struggle to a 5–21 record in September (including a franchise record 11 straight losses).

Shortly before the 2018 season came to a close, the Giants elected to part ways with general manager Bobby Evans, ending his three-year stint as general manager and 24-year career in the Giants organization. Longtime Giants executive Brian Sabean also stepped down as President of Baseball Operations, with the ownership group hiring Farhan Zaidi as his replacement. Zaidi would go on to his first season without a general manager, making a series of efficiency moves to build depth with little payroll available due to extant contracts owed to declining veteran players. Zaidi, known for finding talent in unexpected ways, initiated his 2019 season by trading for Kevin Pillar, the longtime centerfielder from the Toronto Blue Jays. Shortly thereafter, he struck a deal with the Baltimore Orioles for their 28-year-old outfield prospect Mike Yastrzemski, grandson of Boston Red Sox Hall of Famer Carl Yastrzemski. In conjunction with a later trade for Alex Dickerson, Zaidi effectively rebuilt the Giants struggling outfield. Despite the moves, and a compelling July winning streak in which the team went 19–6, the Giants finished 77–85 in manager Bruce Bochy's final season. Following Bochy's departure, Zaidi proceeded to complete the front office hiring that had been on pause since winter 2018 by hiring Scott Harris from the Chicago Cubs organization as the new general manager. The duo then went on the hunt for a new manager and completed the search when they hired new skipper Gabe Kapler, formerly with the Philadelphia Phillies. From there, they proceeded to replace nearly the entire coaching staff with the exceptions of Ron Wotus, José Alguacil, and Shawon Dunston. The front office hired Donnie Ecker, Justin Viele, and Dustin Lind as the new hitting coaches, as well as Andrew Bailey and Brian Bannister as the new pitching staff in addition to others. With the coaching staff in place, the front office made a series of moves during the 2019 Winter Meetings. They then acquired two compensatory draft picks after the departures of closer Will Smith and longtime franchise cornerstone, and World Series hero Madison Bumgarner, both players signing with other teams in free agency: the former with the Atlanta Braves and the latter with the Arizona Diamondbacks. Bumgarner's departure making catcher Buster Posey the only remaining member of the 2010, 2012, and 2014 World Series teams on the active roster.

In the 2020 season, which was shortened to 60 games due to the COVID-19 pandemic, the Giants finished third in the NL West with a 29–31 record, which tied them with the Milwaukee Brewers for the eight seed in the expanded 16-team playoff system. However, the Brewers were named the number eight seed due to them having a better record over their opponents, so the Giants missed the postseason.

In 2021, the Giants held the best record in baseball with 107 wins, the most in the franchise's history, and won the NL West crown for the first time since 2012, just one game ahead of the Los Angeles Dodgers. Kapler was named the NL Manager of the Year, becoming the second Giants manager to win the award. The Giants lost the NLDS to the Dodgers three games to two. Buster Posey retired after the season. This season saw the emergence of Logan Webb as the team's ace, beginning a run of four straight seasons with over 200 innings pitched.

The Giants were unable to repeat their success in 2022, finishing third in the NL West with an 81–81 record. They fared no better in 2023, finishing fourth in the NL West with a 79–83 record. Gabe Kapler was fired in September, and Kai Correa managed the Giants' final three games. The last link to the 2010s dynasty, Brandon Crawford, was not re-signed at season's end.

Ahead of the 2024 season, the Giants lured away manager Bob Melvin from the San Diego Padres, while also signing Cy Young Award-winning pitcher Blake Snell. They also brought in Gold Glove-winning third baseman Matt Chapman and also signed Korean outfielder Jung-hoo Lee. However, the team continued their inconsistent ways in 2024, ultimately finishing with an 80–82 record and fourth place in the NL West. After the season, the Giants fired Zaidi, replacing him with former catcher Buster Posey.

=== 2025–present ===
The Giants entered 2025 by signing former three-time Cy Young Award-winning pitcher Justin Verlander, and shortstop Willy Adames. Midway through the season, they addressed their power needs by acquiring Rafael Devers from the Boston Red Sox. At the time, the Giants were in a playoff spot at 41–31, but after going 13–24 following the Devers trade, the Giants traded away relievers Camilo Doval and Tyler Rogers, and outfielder Mike Yastrzemski at the deadline. The Giants remained in postseason contention until the season's final week, finishing at 81 wins. After the season, Bob Melvin was fired as manager, and the Giants replaced him with Tennessee Volunteers manager Tony Vitello.
