= The Night Game (poem) =

1990 poem written by Robert Pinsky

- by Robert Pinsky
- Language: English
- Subject(s): Baseball; Romantic love
- Publisher: Ecco Press
- Publication date: 1990

"The Night Game" is a poem written by Robert Pinsky. It was published as part of his book The Want Bone in 1990. The poem's title refers to baseball night games, alluding to Pinsky's love of the game. It is a love poem in which he uses baseball to describe a young romance.

== Overview ==
The first few stanzas of the poem refer to Whitey Ford, Hall of Fame left-handed pitcher for the New York Yankees. Pinsky describes Ford, with his blond "halo"-like hair and the name "Ed Ford", as "aristocratic" in comparison to the "Italian, Jewish or Colored". Later in the poem, he says "Possibly I believed only gentiles / And blonds could be left-handed".

In the final stanza of the poem, Pinsky refers to another left-handed pitcher, "Even more gifted / Than Whitey Ford", that he devised during a date with a young girl. The left-hander alluded to is Sandy Koufax, Hall of Fame pitcher for the Los Angeles Dodgers, who, like Pinsky, is Jewish and who, as noted in the last line of the poem, did not pitch on Yom Kippur when it fell on Game 1 of the 1965 World Series.

== See also ==
- Robert Pinsky bibliography
