= 1962 in baseball =

The following are the baseball events of the year 1962 throughout the world.

== Major League Baseball ==
- World Series: New York Yankees over San Francisco Giants (4–3); Ralph Terry, MVP
- All-Star Game (#1), July 10 at D.C. Stadium: National League, 3–1; Maury Wills, MVP
- All-Star Game (#2), July 30 at Wrigley Field: American League, 9–4; Leon Wagner, MVP

=== Other champions ===
- College World Series: Michigan
- Cuban National Series: Industriales
- Japan Series: Toei Flyers over Hanshin Tigers (4–2–1)
- Little League World Series: Moreland, San Jose, California
- Senior League World Series: West Hempstead, New York

== Awards and honors ==
- Baseball Hall of Fame
  - Bob Feller
  - Jackie Robinson
  - Edd Roush
  - Bill McKechnie (manager)

Baseball Writers' Association of America Awards
BBWAA Award	National League	American League
Rookie of the Year	Ken Hubbs (CHC)	Tom Tresh (NYY)
Cy Young Award	Don Drysdale (LAD)	—
Most Valuable Player	Maury Wills (LAD)	Mickey Mantle (NYY)
Gold Glove Awards
Position	National League	American League
Pitcher	Bobby Shantz (STL/HOU)	Jim Kaat (MIN)
Catcher	Del Crandall (MIL)	Earl Battey (MIN)
1st Base	Bill White (STL)	Vic Power (MIN)
2nd Base	Ken Hubbs (CHC)	Bobby Richardson (NYY)
3rd Base	Jim Davenport (SF)	Brooks Robinson (BAL)
Shortstop	Maury Wills (LAD)	Luis Aparicio (CWS)
Outfield	Bill Virdon (PIT)	Jim Landis (CWS)
Outfield	Roberto Clemente (PIT)	Al Kaline (DET)
Outfield	Willie Mays (SF)	Mickey Mantle (NYY)

== Statistical leaders ==
	American League		National League	
Stat	Player	Total	Player	Total
AVG	Pete Runnels (BOS)	.326	Tommy Davis (LAD)	.346
HR	Harmon Killebrew (MIN)	48	Willie Mays (SF)	49
RBI	Harmon Killebrew (MIN)	126	Tommy Davis (LAD)	153
W	Ralph Terry (NYY)	23	Don Drysdale (LAD)	25
ERA	Hank Aguirre (DET)	2.21	Sandy Koufax (LAD)	2.54
K	Camilo Pascual (MIN)	206	Don Drysdale (LAD)	232

== Major league baseball final standings ==
=== American League final standings ===
American League
Team	W	L	Pct.	GB	Home	Road
New York Yankees	96	66	.593	—	50‍–‍30	46‍–‍36
Minnesota Twins	91	71	.562	5	45‍–‍36	46‍–‍35
Los Angeles Angels	86	76	.531	10	40‍–‍41	46‍–‍35
Detroit Tigers	85	76	.528	10½	49‍–‍33	36‍–‍43
Chicago White Sox	85	77	.525	11	43‍–‍38	42‍–‍39
Cleveland Indians	80	82	.494	16	43‍–‍38	37‍–‍44
Baltimore Orioles	77	85	.475	19	44‍–‍38	33‍–‍47
Boston Red Sox	76	84	.475	19	39‍–‍40	37‍–‍44
Kansas City Athletics	72	90	.444	24	39‍–‍42	33‍–‍48
Washington Senators	60	101	.373	35½	27‍–‍53	33‍–‍48

Locations of teams for the 1962–1964 American League seasons
American League

=== National League final standings ===
National League
Team	W	L	Pct.	GB	Home	Road
San Francisco Giants	103	62	.624	—	61‍–‍21	42‍–‍41
Los Angeles Dodgers	102	63	.618	1	54‍–‍29	48‍–‍34
Cincinnati Reds	98	64	.605	3½	58‍–‍23	40‍–‍41
Pittsburgh Pirates	93	68	.578	8	51‍–‍30	42‍–‍38
Milwaukee Braves	86	76	.531	15½	49‍–‍32	37‍–‍44
St. Louis Cardinals	84	78	.519	17½	44‍–‍37	40‍–‍41
Philadelphia Phillies	81	80	.503	20	46‍–‍34	35‍–‍46
Houston Colt .45s	64	96	.400	36½	32‍–‍48	32‍–‍48
Chicago Cubs	59	103	.364	42½	32‍–‍49	27‍–‍54
New York Mets	40	120	.250	60½	22‍–‍58	18‍–‍62

Locations of teams for the 1962–1963 National League seasons
National League

== Nippon Professional Baseball final standings ==
=== Central League final standings ===
Central League	G	W	L	T	Pct.	GB
Hanshin Tigers	133	75	55	3	.577	—
Taiyo Whales	134	71	59	4	.546	4.0
Chunichi Dragons	133	70	60	3	.538	5.0
Yomiuri Giants	134	67	63	4	.515	8.0
Hiroshima Carp	134	56	74	4	.431	19.0
Kokutetsu Swallows	134	51	79	4	.392	24.0

=== Pacific League final standings ===
Pacific League	G	W	L	T	Pct.	GB
Toei Flyers	133	78	52	3	.600	—
Nankai Hawks	133	73	57	3	.562	5.0
Nishitetsu Lions	136	62	68	6	.477	16.0
Daimai Orions	132	60	70	2	.462	18.0
Hankyu Braves	131	60	70	1	.462	18.0
Kintetsu Buffaloes	131	57	73	1	.438	21.0

== Events ==
=== January ===
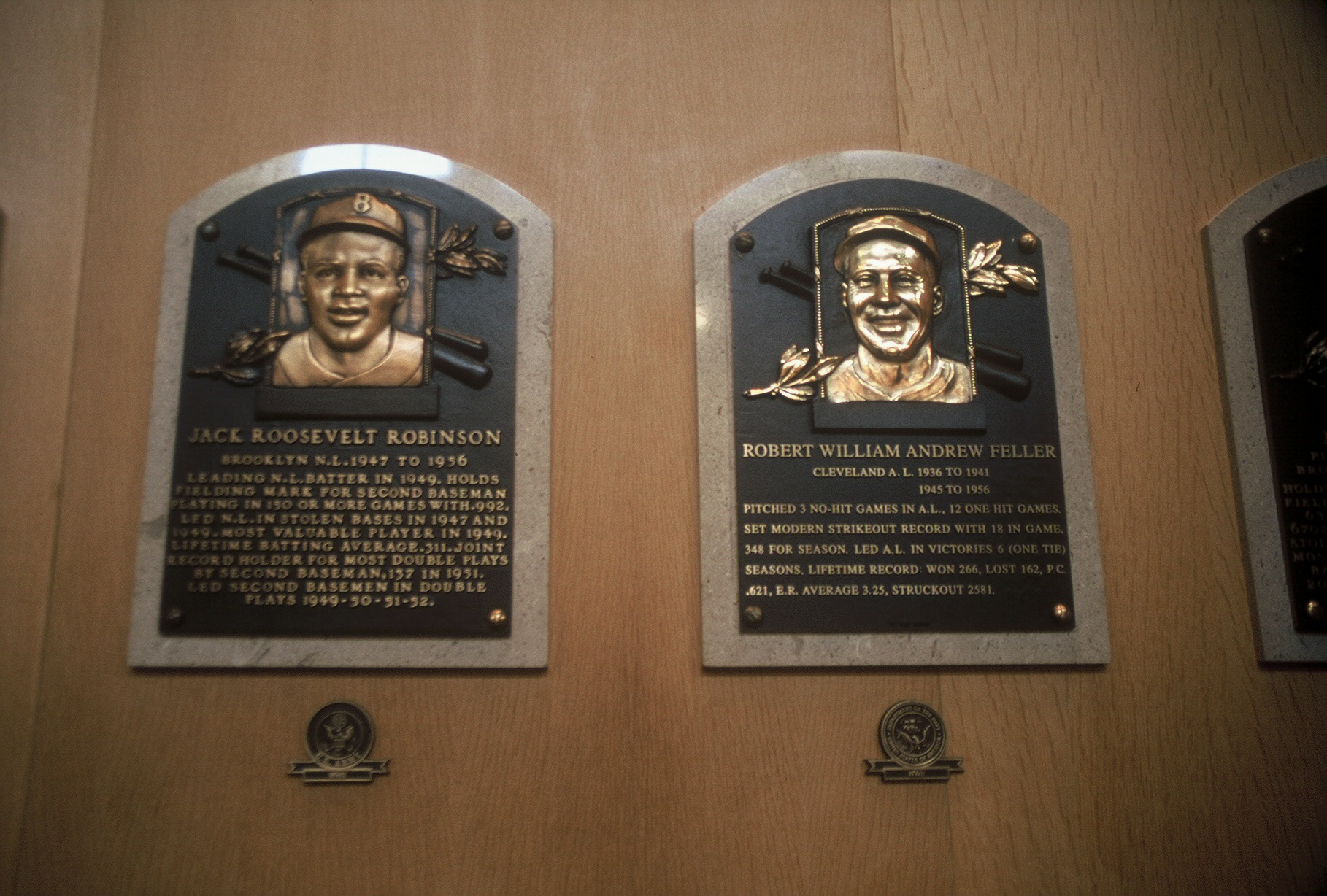
The Hall-of-Fame plaques of Robinson (L) and Feller (R)

- January 7 – The Class B Three–I League, a mainstay mid-level minor circuit in the American Midwest that operated for 55 years between 1901 and 1961, disbands. Many of its member teams will join the Midwest League, a lower-level circuit that is upgraded to a new, consolidated Class A ranking in 1963.
- January 23 – In their first year of eligibility, Bob Feller and Jackie Robinson are elected members of the Hall of Fame by the Baseball Writers' Association of America.
- January 24 – The Double-A Southern Association folds after 61 years of operation, leaving only the six-team Texas League and the semi-independent Mexican League as Double-A circuits for 1962. Only two of the Southern Association's eight teams survive in other leagues in 1962: the Atlanta Crackers and Macon Peaches. The Association was the final post-1946 minor league to enforce racial segregation, remaining all-white except for the Crackers' brief integration experiment in April 1954.
- January 20 – The Cleveland Indians purchase the contract of veteran pitcher Rubén Gómez from the Philadelphia Phillies.
- January 28 – Edd Roush and Bill McKechnie are added to the Hall of Fame by the Special Veterans Committee.

=== February ===
- February 16:
  - The expansion Houston Colt .45s assemble for the first time at their training camp in Apache Junction, Arizona.
  - The newborn New York Mets, whose roster already includes Roger Craig, Gil Hodges, Billy Loes, Charlie Neal and Don Zimmer, sign free-agent pitcher Clem Labine, another veteran of the Brooklyn Dodgers' 1950s NL dynasty. Labine, 35, had been released by the Pittsburgh Pirates in November 1961. He will appear in only three early-season games for the Mets before drawing his final release on May 1, 1962.
- February 19 – The Mets hold their first workout at Huggins–Stengel Field in Saint Petersburg, Florida, where they're greeted by Casey Stengel, their 71-year-old manager for whom the facility is partly named.

=== March ===
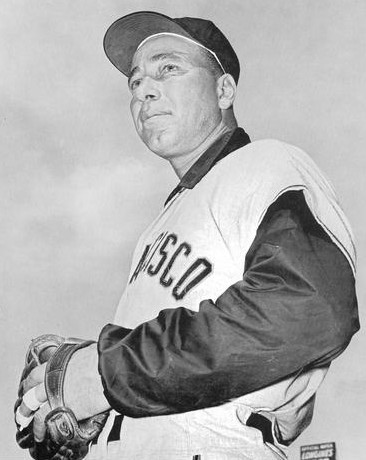
Sam Jones in 1961

- March 1 – Detroit Tigers pitcher Sam Jones, 36, undergoes surgery for the removal of two malignant growths in his neck. He has cobalt treatments during the 1962 season, but appears in 30 games for Detroit between April and September. He will continue to pitch in MLB into 1964, and remain effective in Triple-A into 1967. However, in 1971, four years after he retires from the mound, a recurrence of the cancer takes Jones' life at age 45.
- March 2 – The New York Mets return pitcher Billy Loes, who won 50 games for the 1952–1955 Brooklyn Dodgers, to his previous organization—ironically, the San Francisco Giants, who release the 32-year-old righthander and end his MLB career.
- March 23 – Cincinnati Reds president and general manager William O. DeWitt Sr. buys the franchise itself from the estate of its late owner, Powel Crosley Jr., who died in March 1961. The reported purchase price is $4.27 million.
- March 24 – Veteran third baseman Andy Carey finds his way to the Los Angeles Dodgers after he refuses to report to the Philadelphia Phillies. On December 15, 1961, Carey had been traded by the Chicago White Sox to the Phillies with pitcher Frank Barnes for hurler Taylor Phillips and infielder Bo Sadowski. Today, the White Sox send pitcher Cal McLish to Philadelphia, and take back Carey's contract. The ChiSox then trade Carey to the Dodgers for infielder Ramón Conde and minor-league outfielder Jim Koranda. Carey, 30, a three-time World Series champion with the New York Yankees, reports to the pennant-contending Dodgers and appears in 53 games for them in 1962, his final MLB season.

=== April ===
- April 2 – The Cleveland Indians acquire hard-throwing right-hander Pedro Ramos from the Minnesota Twins for slick-fielding first baseman Vic Power and southpaw Dick Stigman.
- April 3 – The Twins release second baseman Billy Martin, 33, ending his playing career. However, Martin will remain with the franchise as a scout and coach, and in 1969 he will begin his MLB managing career by leading the Twins to the American League West Division championship.
- April 9 – The American League's traditional Presidential opener marks the baseball debut of D.C. Stadium, a multipurpose facility that opened in the autumn of 1961 as the home venue of the Washington Redskins of the National Football League. With John F. Kennedy throwing out the first ball, the 1962 MLB season commences with the hometown Washington Senators defeating the Detroit Tigers 4–1 before a crowd of 44,383.
- April 10:
  - In the first regular-season game ever at Dodger Stadium, the Cincinnati Reds spoil the Los Angeles Dodgers' opening-day party by beating them 6–3 before 52,564 fans. Veteran outfielder Wally Post breaks a 2–2 tie with a three-run home run in the seventh inning off Johnny Podres, the first official homer to be hit in the new stadium.
  - In their MLB debut, and the first Major League Baseball game played in the state of Texas, the Houston Colt .45s defeat the Chicago Cubs 11–2 behind the slugging of outfielder Román Mejías, who belts two homers and drives home six runs. The game is played at Colt Stadium, a 33,000-seat, temporary facility that will be supplanted by the nearby Astrodome in 1965; the official attendance is 25,271.
- April 11 – The New York Mets play their first official game in franchise history, an 11–4 loss to the St. Louis Cardinals at Busch Stadium. Gil Hodges and Charlie Neal, former Brooklyn Dodgers, provide bright spots for the Mets, hitting the team's first-ever home runs.
- April 12 – In his Major League debut, left-hander Pete Richert of the Los Angeles Dodgers ties Karl Spooner's record by striking out the first six batters he faces. Richert enters the game against the Cincinnati Reds at Dodger Stadium with two out in the second inning and strikes out Vada Pinson for the final out. He then records a four-strikeout third inning; the victims are Frank Robinson, Gordy Coleman (who reaches first on a John Roseboro passed ball), Wally Post and Johnny Edwards. To date, Richert is the only pitcher to strike out four batters in one inning in his debut. His record-tying sixth strikeout is of Tommy Harper leading off the fourth inning. The Dodgers defeat the Reds 11–7 with Richert gaining the victory, having struck out seven batters, walking none, and allowing no hits in 3 1/3 innings.
- April 13 – National League baseball returns to New York City, as the Mets play their first home game, a 4–3 loss to the Pittsburgh Pirates before a modest crowd of 12,447 at the venerable Polo Grounds.
- April 18 – Ernie Banks hits his 300th career home run, helping the Chicago Cubs beat the Houston Colt .45s 3–2.
- April 23 – The New York Mets earn their first-ever victory, 9–1 over the Pittsburgh Pirates at Forbes Field behind Jay Hook's complete game. The Mets' record now stands at 1–9; the Pirates, having won their first ten games of 1962 (including five triumphs over the Mets), boast a 10–1 mark.
- April 24 – Casey Stengel is fined $500 by Commissioner Ford Frick for appearing in a Rheingold's beer commercial in full Mets uniform. Appearing in the ad with Stengel was Kathy Kersh, who will achieve fame as Cornelia, one of the Joker's women on the TV series Batman.
- April 30 – The Chicago Cubs acquire nine-year veteran pitcher Bob Buhl, a two-time National League All-Star, from the Milwaukee Braves for sophomore left-hander Jack Curtis.

=== May ===
- May 1 – In Year 2 of the Chicago Cubs' "College of Coaches" era, El Tappe, who served as the Cubs' rotating "head coach" (or de facto manager) for the month of April, is succeeded by Lou Klein after the Cubbies drop 16 of their first 20 games. Klein's tenure will last 30 games until he rotates out of the top job on June 3.
- May 3 – The Cleveland Indians acquire outfielder Willie Tasby from the Washington Senators for two left-handed pitchers, Steve Hamilton and Don Rudolph.
- May 5 – Rookie left-hander Bo Belinsky of the Los Angeles Angels no-hits the Baltimore Orioles 2–0 at Dodger Stadium, which the Angels prefer to call "Chavez Ravine". The no-hitter is the first in the history of both the Angels franchise and Dodger Stadium itself.
- May 7 – The Houston Colt .45s trade southpaw Bobby Shantz to the St. Louis Cardinals for right-hander John Anderson and outfielder Carl Warwick. Shantz, 36 years old and a 14-year MLB veteran, was Houston's starting pitcher in the Colt .45s' first-ever MLB game four weeks ago.

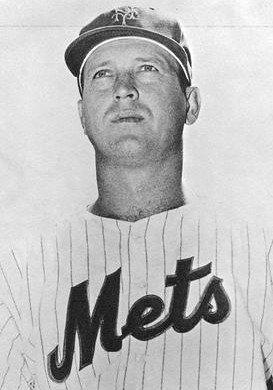
Mets' legend Marv Throneberry

- May 9
  - The 5–16 New York Mets, who in recent days have disposed of veterans like Joe Ginsberg, Clem Labine, Jim Marshall, Bobby Gene Smith and Don Zimmer, continue to shake up their roster. Today they acquire first baseman Marv Throneberry from the Baltimore Orioles for cash and a "player to be named later," who turns out to be catcher Hobie Landrith, their first pick in the October 1961 expansion draft. Throneberry will play less than a full calendar year for the Mets, but, as "Marvelous Marv," he will embody the struggling team's futility.
  - The Mets' expansion counterparts, the Houston Colt .45s, purchase the contract of veteran relief pitcher Don McMahon from the Milwaukee Braves.
- May 12 – Mets relief pitcher Craig Anderson wins both ends of a doubleheader against the Milwaukee Braves. His success will be short-lived, because Anderson will lose his next 16 decisions of 1962 and 19 straight decisions overall. In fact, he will never win another game in the major leagues.
- May 15 – The Los Angeles Angels release veteran left-hander Joe Nuxhall. The following month, Nuxhall will return to the Cincinnati Reds' organization, where he will soon successfully resume his MLB pitching career and eventually become a beloved, long-time member of their broadcast team.
- May 21 – Future Hall-of-Fame pitcher Robin Roberts, 35, signs a free-agent contract with the Baltimore Orioles. He had been without a team since April 25, when the New York Yankees released him without using him in any regular-season games. Roberts will bounce back as an Oriole, making 25 starts, going 10–9, and finishing second in the American League in earned run average (2.78).
- May 22 – In a tense, 12-inning tussle between the Los Angeles Angels and Yankees in the Bronx, Angels manager Bill Rigney orders his pitchers to intentionally walk slugger Roger Maris four times. Although the Yanks strand Maris on base each time, they win the contest, 2–1, on a triple by Joe Pepitone and sacrifice fly by Elston Howard.
- May 26 – The Detroit Tigers' All-Star right fielder, Al Kaline, batting .336 in 36 games so far, breaks his collarbone making a game-saving catch in a 2–1 victory over the New York Yankees. Kaline doesn't return to the lineup until July 23. The Tigers go 26–31 in his absence and are never a factor in the 1962 pennant race.
- May 27 – The last-place New York Mets (12–25) and first-place San Francisco Giants (31–14) engage in a brushback-fueled brawl at Candlestick Park. After Roger Craig hits Orlando Cepeda with a pitch in the seventh, the Mets' hurler tries twice to pick Willie Mays off second base. On Craig's second attempt, Mays spikes Elio Chacón, who punches the Giants' superstar, who then throws the New York second baseman to the ground. Cepeda, meanwhile, charges the mound from first base and punches Craig, and the benches clear. Chacón is ejected (his second game eviction in two days), and San Francisco goes on to win, 7–1, in the first game of a twin bill.
- May 29 – Ernie Banks hits three home runs, but his Chicago Cubs still fall to the Milwaukee Braves 11–9 at Wrigley Field in Chicago.

=== June ===
- June 5 – The Chicago Cubs' "College of Coaches" roulette wheel turns again when Charlie Metro becomes the team's third "head coach" of 1962. However, unlike his ten rotating predecessors' since 1961, his term will last uninterrupted through 112 games and the end of season.
- June 6 – Future Hall-of-Fame manager Tony LaRussa, now a 17-year-old second baseman and recent graduate of a Tampa high school, signs with Charlie Finley's Kansas City Athletics organization, beginning his professional baseball career.
  - Three days later, on June 9, another Tampa product and future manager, 18-year-old outfielder Lou Piniella, enters pro ball by signing with the Cleveland Indians.
- June 10 – Los Angeles Angels left fielder and pinch hitter Earl Averill Jr. ties a Major League record by reaching base in 17 consecutive plate appearances, a mark originally set by Piggy Ward 69 years earlier, in 1893. Averill started his streak—which included eight hits and nine bases on balls—on June 3.
- June 15 – The New York Mets acquire a familiar face for Casey Stengel's outfield in a cash transaction with the Washington Senators: Gene Woodling, now 39, a member of Stengel's first five New York Yankees teams (1949–1953)—all of which were World Series champions.
- June 17 – Marv Throneberry appears to a triple in the first inning in a game against the Chicago Cubs. However, the Cubs protest the play, saying that Throneberry never touched second base. The appeal is confirmed by the second base umpire and Throneberry is declared out. The Mets go on to lose 8–7.
- June 18:
  - At the Polo Grounds, Hank Aaron of the Milwaukee Braves hits a home run over the center field wall. The shot, a grand slam, comes off Jay Hook in the Braves' 7–1 victory over the New York Mets and is the second in back-to-back days, and the third overall, to clear that wall. The day before, Lou Brock of the Chicago Cubs had hit one over the center field wall off the Mets' Al Jackson in the first game of a doubleheader. Joe Adcock had been the only other player to hit a home run over the Polo Grounds' center field wall, doing so for the Braves against the New York Giants on April 29, 1953.
  - At Dodger Stadium, Stan Musial of the St. Louis Cardinals legs out a single off of Sandy Koufax in the second inning, giving him his 5,855th career total base, which breaks Ty Cobb's 37-year-old all-time record. The Cardinals would lose to the Dodgers 1–0.
- June 20 – Mike Fornieles of the Boston Red Sox faces 18 Cleveland Indians batters and hits four of them in only 32/3 innings pitched. No brawl breaks out, but starting pitcher Fornieles (who also throws a wild pitch) absorbs the 3–2 defeat at Municipal Stadium.
- June 23 – Larry Doby becomes the first former major league player to sign with a team in Japan. Doby signed with the Chunichi Dragons of the Nippon Professional Baseball League. However, Doby struggles and only hits .225 in what will be his final professional season.
- June 24 – In 1962's longest MLB game, the New York Yankees and Detroit Tigers struggle for 22 innings before the visiting Bombers prevail 9–7 on a two-run homer from reserve outfielder Jack Reed off Phil Regan. Rookie Jim Bouton fires seven innings of shutout relief to gain his second MLB career win. The Tigers' Rocky Colavito collects seven hits in ten at bats.
- June 26 – At Fenway Park, Boston Red Sox pitcher Earl Wilson no-hits the Los Angeles Angels 2–0 and helps his own cause by homering in the same game. He becomes the third pitcher, after Wes Ferrell in 1931 and Jim Tobin in 1944, to hit a home run supporting his own no-hitter. Rick Wise will join them in 1971, homering twice in his no-hitter. Wilson also becomes the first Black pitcher to throw a no-hitter in the American League.
- June 27 – In Pittsburgh, Richie Ashburn's single in the fourth inning against the Pirates' Bob Friend is the future Hall-of-Fame outfielder's 2,500th career hit; he is the 39th player in history to reach that level. The Pirates defeat Ashburn's Mets, 6–5, in ten innings.

Hall of Famer Sandy Koufax

- June 30 – At Dodger Stadium, Sandy Koufax no-hits the New York Mets 5–0. He begins the game by striking out the first three batters (Richie Ashburn, Rod Kanehl and Félix Mantilla) on nine pitches. The no-hitter is the first by a Dodger since the franchise's move from Brooklyn after the 1957 season, as well as the only one to feature an immaculate inning to date. Koufax will go on to pitch no-hitters in each of the next three seasons, including his perfect game in 1965; his record of four career no-hitters will be broken by Nolan Ryan in 1981.

=== July ===
- July 4 – The season's midpoint sees both of Los Angeles' MLB teams leading their leagues. The talent-rich Dodgers, with aces Sandy Koufax (12–4) and Don Drysdale (14–4) showing the way, are 56–29 (.659), one-half game in front of their bitter rivals, the San Francisco Giants (55–29) in the Senior Circuit. Shockingly, the second-year Los Angeles Angels, one year removed from expansion team status, sit atop the American League at 45–34 (.570), also by a half-game, over the New York Yankees (43–33) and Cleveland Indians (44–34). The Angels are led by the less-heralded mound duo of Ken McBride (8–3) and Bo Belinsky (7–2).
- July 9 – At a meeting held in conjunction with the All-Star Game, the major league players request a reduced schedule for the 1963 season. They also vote unanimously to continue playing two All-Star Games each year.
- July 10 – At newly opened D.C. Stadium, John F. Kennedy becomes the only U.S. president ever to throw the ceremonial first pitch at an All-Star Game, as the National League beats the American League, 3–1, in the first All-Star Game of 1962. Highlights include Maury Wills scoring two of the NL's three runs, Roberto Clemente rapping three hits, and Willie Mays making an amazing game-ending catch. Wills receives the first All-Star MVP honors.
- July 11:
  - For the first time since 1938, when Lloyd and Paul Waner pulled the trick, brothers Hank and Tommie Aaron hit home runs in the same inning. Both were hit in the last of the ninth, and Hank's grand slam provides the winning margin in an 8–6 Braves win over the Cardinals.
  - The New York Yankees reacquire veteran first baseman and pinch hitter Dale Long from the Washington Senators in exchange for outfielder Don Lock, 25, on the roster of Triple-A Richmond. Lock will become a regular in Washington's outfield through the 1966 campaign.
- July 13 – Boston Red Sox right-fielder Lou Clinton hits for the cycle in a 15–inning, 11–10 triumph over the Kansas City Athletics at Municipal Stadium. It's the only "cycle" in the majors this season.
- July 14 – Unfortunately for Ralph Branca, it is 11 years too late and it doesn't count anyway. In the New York Mets' first Old-Timers' Game, reliever Branca faces Bobby Thomson, who hit the historic "walk-off" home run against him to give the old Giants the 1951 pennant. This time, Branca gets Thomson out on a fly ball to center. In the real game itself, the Los Angeles Dodgers thrash the Mets, 17–0.
- July 17 – At Crosley Field, Sandy Koufax is forced to leave the mound after only one inning against the Cincinnati Reds. Suffering from a finger ailment known as Raynauds' Syndrome, which began when he was hit by a pitch in a game on April 28, the future Hall of Famer (14–4, 209 strikeouts and 2.15 ERA going into today) will miss more than two months of action and lose his last three decisions. His absence and subsequent struggle prove costly to his first-place Los Angeles Dodgers, who will go only 30–26 in August and September and end the 162-game season in a dead heat with their rivals, the San Francisco Giants.
- July 18 – The Minnesota Twins become the first major league club in the 20th century to hit two grand slams in one inning when Bob Allison and Harmon Killebrew connect in a team-record 11-run first inning against the Cleveland Indians. Pitchers Barry Latman and Jim Perry serve the grand gophers in the Twins' 14–3 drubbing of the Tribe.
- July 20 – The St. Louis Cardinals' Minnie Miñoso returns to action for the first time since May 11, when he fractured his skull and broke his right wrist running into an outfield wall. On August 19, he'll be hit by a pitch in the sixth and suffer a broken bone in his left forearm.
- July 22 – The Chicago White Sox' Floyd Robinson is six for six – all singles – in a 7–3 victory over the Boston Red Sox.
- July 26 – Warren Spahn of the Milwaukee Braves sets the National League record for home runs by a pitcher, when he hits his 31st off New York's Craig Anderson. Spahn also deals the Mets their 11th straight loss in a 6–1 Milwaukee victory.
- July 30 – Home runs by Leon Wagner, Pete Runnels, and Rocky Colavito power the American League past the National League 9–4 in the second All-Star Game of 1962. Wagner is selected MVP.

=== August ===
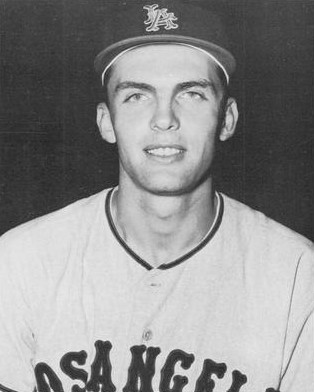
Dean Chance

- August 1 – Bill Monbouquette of the Boston Red Sox no-hits the Chicago White Sox, 1–0, at Comiskey Park, the Red Sox' second no-hitter of the season. Al Smith, who walked in the second inning, is the only baserunner Monbouquette allows. Monbouquette's catcher, Jim Pagliaroni, scores the game's lone run on a Lou Clinton single in the eighth inning.
- August 3 – At the Polo Grounds, the New York Mets blast five home runs—two by Frank Thomas, and one each by Choo Choo Coleman, Charlie Neal and Marv Throneberry—but fall to the visiting Cincinnati Reds, 8–6. The Mets are now 26–79 (.248), 45 games behind the Los Angeles Dodgers.
- August 6 – Veteran relief pitcher Johnny Klippstein throws three spotless innings, then smashes his first home run since June 1953 to deliver a 13-inning, 1–0 victory for his Cincinnati Reds over the Houston Colt .45s at Colt Stadium. Klippstein hurls today in relief of starter Bob Purkey, who tossed ten scoreless frames, and his feat comes in the middle of the Cincinnati pitching staff's streak of 381/3 consecutive shutout innings pitched, most in the majors in 1962.
- August 10 – At "Chavez Ravine", rookie Dean Chance of the Los Angeles Angels outduels future Baseball Hall of Fame member Jim Kaat, 1–0 in 11 innings. Leon Wagner's RBI single drives home the winning run.
- August 14 – It takes 15 innings, but the visiting Philadelphia Phillies defeat the New York Mets, 3–1. Met first baseman Marv Throneberry's error is key to the Phils' winning rally.
- August 19 – With each team belting four homers, the first-place New York Yankees humble the ninth-place Kansas City Athletics, 21–7, at Municipal Stadium. The Yanks amass 20 hits, with Elston Howard (two homers, eight RBI) and Mickey Mantle (one homer, seven RBI) doing the heaviest damage to the KC mound staff. New York's 21 runs scored are the most by any MLB team in 1962.
- August 26 – At Metropolitan Stadium, southpaw Jack Kralick of the Minnesota Twins no-hits the Kansas City Athletics, 1–0. Kralick retires the first 25 batters before a walk to the 26th hitter spoils his bid for a perfect game. The no-hitter is the first in the franchise's Minnesota history; it had moved from Washington after the 1960 season. It's also the fifth no-no in MLB in 1962.

=== September ===
- September 2 – Ken Hubbs, the Chicago Cubs' 21-year-old rookie, plays his 74th consecutive errorless game as a second baseman, breaking an MLB record set by Bobby Doerr in 1948. Hubbs has handled 396 chances flawlessly since committing his last error on June 14.
- September 3 – The 1962 season's post-Labor Day stretch run will begin with the Los Angeles Dodgers (90–48) leading the San Francisco Giants (87–50) by 2½ games in the National League, and the New York Yankees (82–58) up by three games over the Minnesota Twins (79–61) in the American League, with the Los Angeles Angels (77–62) still a viable contender at 3½ games back. The surprising Twins and Angels finished in the AL's second division in 1961.
- September 5 – John Kennedy, a 21-year-old rookie for the Washington Senators, homers in his first MLB at-bat off left-hander Dick Stigman at D.C. Stadium. He makes headlines because he shares his name with the 35th President of the United States, and both men were born on May 29 (though 24 years apart). Infielder Kennedy will forge a 12-year MLB career with five clubs.
- September 9:
  - Future Hall-of-Famer Tony Oliva makes his major league debut, striking out against right-hander Bob Humphreys in his only plate appearance in the Minnesota Twins' 10–9 loss to the Detroit Tigers.
  - Boston Red Sox rookie relief ace Dick "The Monster" Radatz throws seven innings of one-run, nine-strikeout ball and earns the victory when the Bosox edge the pennant-bound New York Yankees 5–4 in 16 innings at The Bronx. Radatz (8–5) is actually out-pitched by Yankee left-hander Marshall Bridges, who goes nine innings of one-run relief, but is defeated by Billy Gardner's successful squeeze bunt.
- September 10 – Mickey Mantle hits his 400th career home run, helping the Yankees beat the Detroit Tigers 3–1.
- September 12 – Washington Senators right-hander Tom Cheney strikes out 21 Baltimore Orioles hitters over 16 innings in a 2–1 triumph at Memorial Stadium. He throws 228 pitches, and may have suffered a career-shortening injury, but Cheney's record still stands for most Ks by a pitcher in a single game.
- September 16 – Willie Stargell makes his major league debut as a pinch hitter going hitless in his lone at bat in the Pittsburgh Pirates' 6–4 win over the second-place San Francisco Giants at Forbes Field. Meanwhile, Chicago Cubs veteran Bob Buhl fires a four-hitter and defeats the first-place Los Angeles Dodgers, 5–0, at Wrigley Field. With 12 games left in the regular season, the Dodgers (98–52) lead the Giants (92–56) by four full games in the National League.
- September 23 – At Busch Stadium, Maury Wills of the Dodgers pilfers two bases against the St. Louis Cardinals to eclipse Ty Cobb's for stolen bases in a season, which had stood at 96 for 47 years. Cobb's and Wills' records were each set over 156 league games. With his season elongated by the three-game NL tie-breaker series, Wills will purloin 104 bags in 165 games in 1962.
- September 25 – The defending World Series champion New York Yankees clinch the 1962 American League pennant by besting the Washington Senators 8–3 behind Whitey Ford (17–8) and Mickey Mantle, who goes four for four, with two runs scored and two RBI. It's the Bombers' 27th AL flag since they won their first in 1921.
- September 27 – The expansion Houston Colt .45s make two seventh-inning runs stand up, as they triumph, 8–6, over first-place Los Angeles at Dodger Stadium. A four-inning, scoreless effort by veteran Houston reliever Jim Umbricht earns him the win. The loss is the first of a catastrophic five-game slide that sees the Dodgers fritter away a two-game lead over the San Francisco Giants by the end of the National League's regular-season schedule.
- September 29 – Hank Bauer quits as manager of the ninth-place Kansas City Athletics before owner Charles O. Finley can fire him. Bauer's successor is former New York Yankees teammate Eddie Lopat. Finley will hire Bauer again in 1969 to manage his team, by then based in Oakland, and fire him that September.
- September 30 – Gene Oliver's solo homer off Johnny Podres supplies the only run that veteran St. Louis Cardinals lefty Curt Simmons needs, as St. Louis shuts out Los Angeles, 1–0, at Dodger Stadium. Meanwhile, at Candlestick Park, Willie Mays slugs an eighth-inning solo shot off the Houston Colt .45s' Turk Farrell to give the San Francisco Giants a 2–1 victory and a first-place tie with the Dodgers after a full-slate of 162 games. For the fourth time in 17 years, the National League pennant race will be decided by a best-of-three tiebreaker series. All of them have involved the Dodger franchise, including their classic 1951 matchup with the Giants, played when the two teams were still based in New York City.

=== October ===
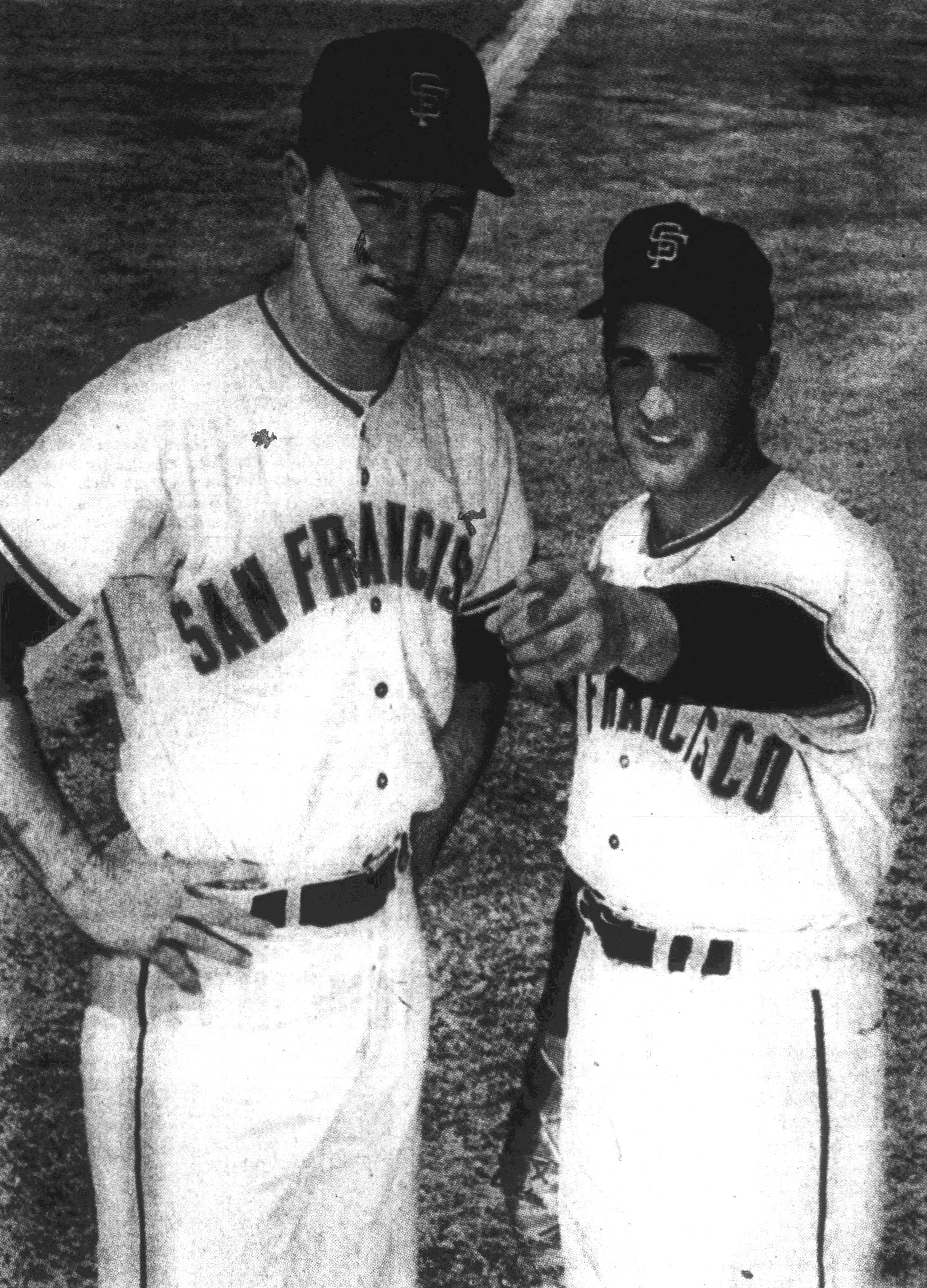
Giants battery-mates Tom Haller (L) and Billy Pierce

- October 3 – Eleven years to the day since the New York Giants beat the Brooklyn Dodgers for the National League pennant on Bobby Thomson's "Shot Heard Round the World" home run, the visiting San Francisco Giants score four runs in the top of the ninth to defeat the Los Angeles Dodgers, 6–4, in the decisive third game of the 1962 National League tie-breaker series. The Giants' Jim Davenport draws a bases-loaded walk off Stan Williams, scoring Felipe Alou with the winning run, then an insurance marker scores on an error by Los Angeles second baseman Larry Burright. Giants' reliever Don Larsen, famed for his perfect game during the 1956 World Series, earns the victory, with southpaw Billy Pierce, who had hurled a shutout in the first game of the tiebreaker, getting the save by retiring the Dodgers in order in the home half of the ninth. It's the Giants' first pennant since 1954, their first since relocating to San Francisco in 1958, and 18th overall since the club joined the NL in 1883.
- October 5 – Birdie Tebbetts, manager of the Milwaukee Braves since September 1961, steps down to take the reins of the Cleveland Indians, who fired skipper Mel McGaha on September 29. Tebbetts is reunited in Cleveland with general manager Gabe Paul; the pair worked together in Cincinnati from 1954–1958.
- October 6 – Former shortstop and fan favorite Johnny Pesky, 43, is promoted to manager of the Boston Red Sox, replacing Pinky Higgins, who moves upstairs to general manager. Pesky had been managing Triple-A Seattle, the Bosox' top farm club.
- October 11 – The New York Mets purchase the contracts of minor-league infielder Ron Hunt from the Milwaukee Braves, and catcher Norm Sherry and outfielder Dick Smith from the Los Angeles Dodgers. Hunt, 21, proves to be the most impactful acquisition, becoming the Mets' regular second baseman in 1963 en route to a 12-year NL career.

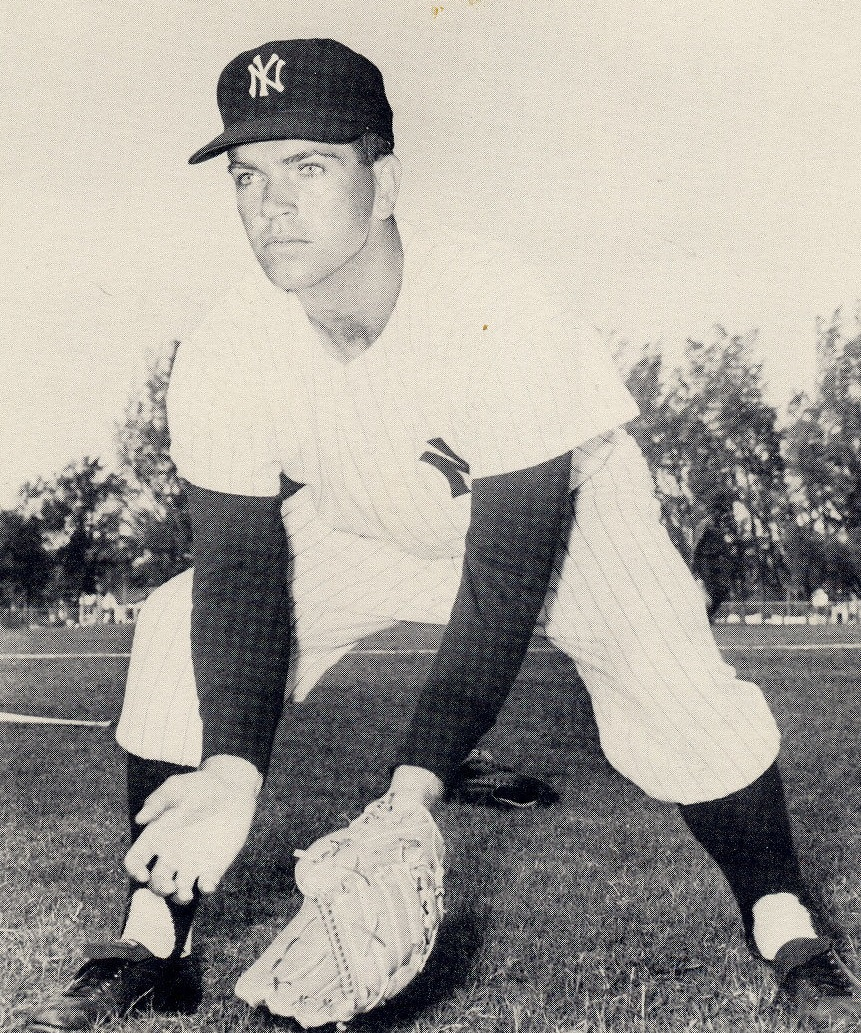
Bobby Richardson

- October 16 – The New York Yankees defeat the San Francisco Giants, 1–0, in the seventh game of the World Series to win their second straight World Series championship and 20th overall. The Giants, down to their last out, threaten with Matty Alou on third and Willie Mays on second, but Yankees second baseman Bobby Richardson snags a screaming line drive by Willie McCovey to preserve the win. New York pitcher Ralph Terry is named Series MVP.
- October 17:
  - The St. Louis Cardinals obtain All-Star outfielder George Altman and pitcher Don Cardwell from the Chicago Cubs for former All-Star pitchers Larry Jackson and Lindy McDaniel; two backup catchers, Jimmie Schaffer and Moe Thacker, also swap teams. Altman will have a disappointing 1963 campaign in his only season as a Redbird, and Jackson will win 24 games for the 1964 Cubs, but the Cardwell acquisition gives the Cardinals a key piece in a momentous November 19 transaction.
  - Bobby Bragan fills the Milwaukee Braves' vacant managerial post. He had previously managed the Pittsburgh Pirates (1956–1957) and Cleveland Indians (1958).
- October 29 – The New York Yankees sell the contract of one-time ace right-hander Bob Turley to the Los Angeles Angels. Turley, 32, has been struggling with arm woes since his banner 1958 season, when he won the Cy Young Award and was named MVP of the 1958 World Series.

=== November ===
- November 9 – Chicago Cubs owner Philip K. Wrigley announces that the "College of Coaches" concept will be retained for 1963 but that Charlie Metro, who compiled a 43–69 mark as head coach from June 5 through season's end, will not return. The 1962 Cubs (59–103 overall) finished ninth in the new, ten-team National League, behind the expansion Houston Colt .45s.
- November 11 – Ken Hubbs of the Chicago Cubs becomes the first rookie to win a Gold Glove Award.
- November 16 – Principal owner Louis R. Perini sells the Milwaukee Braves to a syndicate headed by Chicago businessman William Bartholomay for a reported $5.5 million. Perini originally bought into the Braves in 1944, when they were based in his home city of Boston, then moved them to Milwaukee in 1953. However, after six years of record-setting attendance at Milwaukee County Stadium, declining fan support is endangering the team's future in Wisconsin.
- November 19 – St. Louis Cardinals general manager Bing Devine sends hurler Don Cardwell (obtained in October) and shortstop Julio Gotay to the Pittsburgh Pirates for All-Star shortstop Dick Groat (the National League MVP for 1960) and reliever Diomedes Olivo. Newly hired Cardinals consultant Branch Rickey, convinced that Groat is too old at age 32, strongly criticizes Devine's trade, but Groat will remain the NL's All-Star shortstop in 1963 and 1964. In the former year, he will bat .319 with 201 hits and 43 doubles and finish #2 in the 1963 MVP race; in the latter year, he is a key team leader during the Cardinals' 1964 pennant drive and World Series triumph.

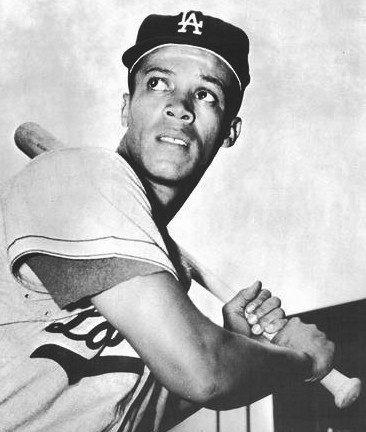
NL MVP Maury Wills

- November 20:
  - Mickey Mantle wins his third and final American League Most Valuable Player Award. The 31-year-old superstar captures 13 of 20 first-place votes, and out-points teammate and runner-up Bobby Richardson, 234 to 152.
  - The Chicago White Sox release future Baseball Hall of Fame pitcher Early Wynn. The 42-year-old veteran right-hander won his 299th MLB game on September 8 and must go for #300 in a different uniform in 1963.
- November 21 – Always in search of right-handed power, the Boston Red Sox acquire slugging first baseman Dick Stuart from the Pittsburgh Pirates, along with relief pitcher Jack Lamabe, for pitcher Don Schwall (1961's AL Rookie of the Year) and 25-year-old catcher Jim Pagliaroni. Stuart, 30, will live up to his reputation for home-run power and terrible defensive play during his two seasons in Boston.
- November 23 – Los Angeles Dodgers shortstop Maury Wills, whose 104 stolen bases broke a major league season-record set by Ty Cobb, wins the National League Most Valuable Player Award. In a controversial vote, Wills beats out teammate Tommy Davis, who led the league with a .346 batting average and 153 RBI.
- November 26:
  - The first-year professional player draft, an early 1960s contrivance designed to curb amateur bonuses, sees significant transactions today. Among them, the Chicago Cubs obtain future standout second baseman Glenn Beckert from the Boston Red Sox; the Baltimore Orioles obtain three young outfielders, Paul Blair (from the New York Mets), Dave May (from the San Francisco Giants) and Curt Motton (from the Cubs); the Washington Senators pluck outfielder Lou Piniella from the Cleveland Indians' organization; and the Houston Colt .45s draft future slugger Jim Wynn from the Cincinnati Reds.
  - The New York Yankees part with their long-time first baseman, Bill Skowron, sending him to Los Angeles Dodgers for hard-throwing right-hander Stan Williams.
  - The Boston Red Sox trade 1962 AL batting-average champ Pete Runnels (.326) to the Houston Colt .45s for Román Mejías, who led the first-year expansion team in hits (162), home runs (24), slugging percentage (.445) and runs batted in (76). The veteran players struggle in their new leagues, however, and both are out of the majors by the end of 1964.
  - The Orioles send their long-time regular catcher, Gus Triandos, and outfielder Whitey Herzog to the Detroit Tigers for Dick Brown, the Tigers' #1 catcher.
- November 27:
  - The Milwaukee Braves trade their veteran first sacker, Joe Adcock, and southpaw pitcher Jack Curtis to the Cleveland Indians for pitcher Frank Funk and outfielders Don Dillard and Ty Cline ("player to be named later").
  - The Philadelphia Phillies acquire future starting second baseman Cookie Rojas from the Cincinnati Reds for pitcher Jim Owens.
- November 28 – The Phillies acquire pugnacious veteran third baseman Don Hoak, 34, from the Pittsburgh Pirates for first baseman Pancho Herrera and outfielder Ted Savage.
- November 29:
  - After 61 years of continuous operation, the Triple-A American Association folds its tent, along with two of its member teams, Louisville and Omaha. The four remaining Association franchises are absorbed by the surviving Triple-A circuits, the International League and Pacific Coast League. The PCL adds Dallas–Fort Worth, Denver and Oklahoma City, and drops Vancouver. The International League adds Indianapolis from the Association and enfranchises a new club, the Arkansas Travelers. As a result, both Triple-A circuits become ten-club leagues.
  - MLB officials and player representatives agree to return to a single All-Star Game in 1963. The players' pension fund will receive 95 percent of the one game's proceeds (rather than 60 percent of the two games).
- November 30:
  - The Los Angeles Dodgers pick up pitcher Bob Miller from the New York Mets for first baseman Tim Harkness and second baseman Larry Burright. Miller, 23, only 1–12 with the 1962 Mets, will be a valuable bullpen arm and occasional starter for the Dodgers through 1967.
  - The Houston Colt .45s, the Mets' expansion counterparts, make two deals. They acquire pitchers Don Nottebart and Connie Grob and outfielder Jim Bolger from the Milwaukee Braves for first baseman Norm Larker. Then they send infielder Joey Amalfitano to the San Francisco Giants for pitcher Dick LeMay and outfielder Manny Mota.

=== December ===
- December 1 – Minor League Baseball overhauls its classification hierarchy below the Triple-A level. The Eastern and South Atlantic leagues are promoted from Class A to Double-A. Meanwhile, Classes B, C and D are abolished, with those leagues being promoted to a new Class A level. The Class B leagues were the Carolina and Northwest leagues; the Class C circuits were the California, Mexican Center, Northern, and Pioneer leagues. Class D comprised the Florida State, Georgia-Florida, Midwest, New York-Pennsylvania and Western Carolinas leagues. The short-season Appalachian League moves from Class D to a new Rookie League classification.
- December 5 – The Washington Senators trade left-hander Pete Burnside and utilityman Bob "Rocky" Johnson to the Baltimore Orioles for lefty Art Quirk, infielder Marv Breeding and outfielder Barry Shetrone.
- December 11 – The Boston Red Sox trade pitcher Tracy Stallard, infielder Pumpsie Green and a "player to be named later" (shortstop Al Moran) to the New York Mets for infielder Félix Mantilla.
- December 13 – The Red Sox and Houston Colt .45s trade veteran outfielders, with Boston sending Carroll Hardy to Houston for Dick Williams. The 33-year-old Williams will spend two seasons as a Boston reserve, then begin his Hall-of-Fame managerial career in the Red Sox farm system in 1965.
- December 15:
  - A six-player transaction highlights the last day of an active inter-league trading period. In it, the Baltimore Orioles acquire pitchers Stu Miller and Mike McCormick and catcher John Orsino from the San Francisco Giants for pitchers Jack Fisher and Billy Hoeft and catcher Jimmie Coker. The Orioles get the upper hand in the deal, as change-up artist Miller anchors the Oriole bullpen for the next five years, leading the American League in games pitched and saves in 1963. Four years later, the Giants will reacquire southpaw McCormick, a former bonus baby who in 1960 led the National League in ERA, and he will win 22 games and the NL Cy Young Award for them in 1967.
  - The St. Louis Cardinals acquire right-hander Ron Taylor and shortstop Jack Kubiszyn from the Cleveland Indians for first baseman Fred Whitfield.

== Movies ==
- Safe at Home!

== Births ==
=== January ===
- January 3 – Darren Daulton
- January 4 – Jay Tibbs
- January 5 – Danny Jackson
- January 7 – Jeff Montgomery
- January 10
  - Mario Díaz
  - Jim Lindeman
- January 11 – Donn Pall
- January 13 – Kevin Mitchell
- January 14 – Gary Green
- January 19 – Chris Sabo
- January 23 – Benny Distefano
- January 25 – Juan Castillo
- January 26 – Rick Schu

=== February ===
- February 2
  - Pat Clements
  - Paul Kilgus
- February 3 – Joe Klink
- February 4 – Dan Plesac
- February 14 – Bruce Crabbe
- February 15 – Rolando Roomes
- February 16 – Dwayne Henry
- February 18 – Rocky Childress
- February 19 – Álvaro Espinoza
- February 26 – Kelly Gruber
- February 27 – Greg Cadaret

=== March ===
- March 1 – Mark Gardner
- March 2 – Terry Steinbach
- March 7
  - José Canó
  - Germán González
- March 12 – Darryl Strawberry
- March 13
  - Tom Funk
  - Terry Lee
- March 18 – Brian Fisher
- March 19 – Iván Calderón
- March 20 – Kuo Tai-yuan
- March 24 – Ron Robinson
- March 25 – Jeff Kunkel
- March 26 – Kevin Seitzer
- March 29 – Billy Beane

=== April ===
- April 1 – Rich Amaral
- April 3
  - Marty Clary
  - Dave Miley
- April 11 – Tim Fortugno
- April 13 – Jeff Bittiger
- April 21 – Les Lancaster
- April 28
  - Russ Morman
  - Luis Quiñones

=== May ===
- May 2 – Jim Walewander
- May 5 – Ramón Peña
- May 6 – Tom Bolton
- May 8 – Orestes Destrade
- May 9 – Laddie Renfroe
- May 10
  - Joey Meyer
  - Robby Thompson
- May 17 – Greg Mathews
- May 29 – Eric Davis
- May 31 – Joe Orsulak

=== June ===
- June 1 – Jessie Reid
- June 2 – Darnell Coles
- June 8 – John Gibbons
- June 12 – Darrel Akerfelds
- June 16
  - Wally Joyner
  - Calvin Schiraldi
- June 17 – Stu Tate
- June 18 – Dave Leiper
- June 19 – Craig Smajstrla
- June 22 – Bryan Price
- June 23 – Chris Beasley
- June 24 – Charlie Mitchell
- June 30 – Tony Fernández

=== July ===
- July 4 – Johnny Abrego
- July 5 – Jeff Innis
- July 11 – Brian Brady
- July 13 – Robbie Wine
- July 19 – Dick Scott
- July 25 – Doug Drabek
- July 26 – Jody Reed
- July 29 – Randy McCament
- July 30 – Tom Pagnozzi
- July 31 – Ed Hickox

=== August ===
- August 1 – Scott Anderson
- August 3 – Mackey Sasser
- August 4
  - Roger Clemens
  - John Farrell
- August 7 – John Trautwein
- August 10 – Mike Schooler
- August 12
  - Urbano Lugo
  - Dave Pavlas
- August 14 – Mark Gubicza
- August 18 – Scott Arnold
- August 23 – C. B. Bucknor
- August 25 – Oddibe McDowell
- August 31 – Greg Tubbs

=== September ===
- September 2 – Johnny Paredes
- September 3 – Dave Clark
- September 8 – Al Pardo
- September 9 – Joe Strong
- September 19 – Randy Myers
- September 22 – Ray Stephens
- September 24 – Doug Davis
- September 27 – Don Schulze
- September 28
  - Todd Frohwirth
  - Rob Woodward
- September 30 – Dave Magadan

=== October ===
- October 3 – Rich Surhoff
- October 4 – Dennis Cook
- October 4
  - Tony Ferreira
  - Chris James
- October 5 – Tracy Woodson
- October 6 – Rich Yett
- October 12 – Sid Fernandez
- October 14 – Carl Nichols
- October 17 – Glenn Braggs
- October 19 – Oswaldo Peraza
- October 20 – Randy Asadoor
- October 24 – Gene Larkin
- October 27
  - Terry Bell
  - Mike Dunne
- October 30
  - Mark Portugal
  - Danny Tartabull

=== November ===
- November 3 – Sherman Corbett
- November 6 – Leo García
- November 8
  - John Fishel
  - Rey Palacios
- November 9 – Dion James
- November 11 – Cory Snyder
- November 12 – Jeff Reed
- November 12 – Wilfredo Tejada
- November 14 – Steve Peters
- November 16 – Mike Raczka
- November 17 – Ray Chadwick
- November 18 – Jamie Moyer
- November 21 – Dick Schofield
- November 24 – Randy Velarde
- November 26 – Chuck Finley
- November 30
  - Bo Jackson
  - Gary Wayne

=== December ===
- December 1 – Tim Jones
- December 4 – Stan Jefferson
- December 5
  - Alan Cockrell
  - Germán Jiménez
- December 19
  - Clay Parker
  - Bill Wegman
- December 22 – John Hoover
- December 25
  - Marty Pevey
  - Bruce Walton
- December 29 – Devon White

== Deaths ==
=== January ===
- January 5
  - Dick Lundy, 63, All-Star shortstop, second baseman and manager in the Negro leagues between 1916 and 1940; unofficially batted .484 in 1921, led Eastern Colored League in RBI (with 76) in 1927, and captured batting title of East–West League (.381) in 1932.
  - Frank Snyder, 68, catcher who appeared in 1,392 games for the St. Louis Cardinals and New York Giants from 1912 to 1927, including Giants' 1921–22 World Series champions; spent 1933–1941 as a Giants' coach, including 1933 champs.
- January 6 – Billy Purtell, 76, infielder—chiefly a third baseman—who played in 335 career contests for the Chicago White Sox (1908–1910), Boston Red Sox (1910–1911) and Detroit Tigers (1914).
- January 7
  - Ad Brennan, 74, left-hander who pitched for four clubs, chiefly Philadelphia of the National League and Chicago of the "outlaw" Federal League, from 1910 to 1915 and in 1918.
  - Dutch Lerchen, 72, shortstop for the 1910 Boston Red Sox.
- January 10
  - Fred Bratschi, 69, backup outfielder for the Chicago White Sox and Boston Red Sox between 1921 and 1927.
  - Tillie Shafer, 72, infielder and pinch hitter who played in 283 games for the New York Giants (1909–1910, 1912–1913); appeared in both 1912 and 1913 World Series on losing teams.
- January 14
  - Les Mann, 68, outfielder for five NL teams who in the 1914 World Series drove in Game 2's only run in the top of the 9th and scored the winning run in the 12th inning of Game 3 for the "Miracle Braves".
  - Pep Young, 54, second baseman who played in 730 games over ten seasons for three National League clubs, chiefly the Pittsburgh Pirates, between 1933 and 1945.
- January 18 – Bob Barrett, 82, third baseman who played 239 MLB games for the Chicago Cubs (1923–1925), Brooklyn Robins (1925 and 1927) and Boston Red Sox (1929).
- January 22 – Lefty Russell, 71, pitcher who dropped five of six career decisions over 13 games as a member of the 1910–1912 Philadelphia Athletics.
- January 26 – Steve O'Neill, 70, workhorse catcher for the 1911–1923 Cleveland Naps/Indians and member of 1920 World Series champions; later managed the Detroit Tigers to the 1945 title; also skippered Indians, Boston Red Sox and Philadelphia Phillies between 1935 and 1954; one of four brothers to play in majors.
- January 27
  - Joe Vosmik, 51, All-Star outfielder (1935) for five MLB teams (1930–1941 and 1944), principally his hometown Indians, who hit .307 lifetime and exceeded the .300 mark six times; led American League in hits (216), doubles (47) and triples (20) in 1935; also led AL in hits (201) in 1938.
  - Jim Shaw, 68, reliable starter and reliever on Washington Senators' pitching staff from 1913 to 1921; won 15 or more games four times; led 1919 American League in games pitched, innings pitched, and saves; also led Junior Circuit in saves in 1914.
  - Bob Steele, 67, Canadian southpaw who posted a 16–38 won–lost mark and a 3.05 earned run average in 91 career appearances for the St. Louis Cardinals, Pittsburgh Pirates and New York Giants from 1916 to 1919.
- January 28 – Steve Melter, 76, pitcher who appeared in 23 games, 22 in relief, for the 1909 St. Louis Cardinals.
- January 30 – Ray Roberts, 66, pitcher who worked in three games for the 1919 Philadelphia Athletics.

=== February ===
- February 6 – Ernest Lanigan, 89, statistician, sportswriter and historian who in the 1890s devised the run batted in and other statistics, in 1922 wrote the sport's first comprehensive biographical encyclopedia; later historian at the Hall of Fame for ten years.
- February 8 – Charlie Meara, 70, outfielder for the 1914 New York Yankees.
- February 9
  - Tex Burnett, 62, catcher/first baseman/outfielder who appeared for nine different Negro leagues clubs over 12 seasons between 1922 and 1941.
  - Bernie Duffy, 68, pitcher for the 1913 Pittsburgh Pirates.
- February 10 – Roy Walker, 68, pitcher who worked in 91 career games for the Cleveland Naps/Indians (1912, 1915), Chicago Cubs (1917–1918) and St. Louis Cardinals (1921–1922).
- February 12 – Dick Wheeler, 64, outfielder and pinch hitter in three games for the 1918 Cardinals.
- February 22 – Paul Speraw, 68, whose 16-year professional career included one game in MLB as a third baseman for the St. Louis Browns on September 15, 1920.
- February 24 – Max Bishop, 62, second baseman for the Philadelphia Athletics from 1924 to 1933, member of Philadelphia's AL pennant winners from 1929 to 1931 and 1929–1930 World Series champions; coach at the U.S. Naval Academy since 1938.
- February 25 – Tink Turner, 72, pitcher who appeared in one game (hurling two innings) for last-place 1915 Philadelphia Athletics; spent 1924 season as a St. Louis Cardinals coach.

=== March ===
- March 1
  - Hal Janvrin, 69, infielder who appeared in 759 games over ten seasons for four clubs between 1911 and 1922, notably the Boston Red Sox, where he was a member of the 1915 and 1916 world championship squads.
  - Horace Jenkins, 70, outfielder who played between 1910 and 1921 for a series of Chicago-based Negro leagues teams.
- March 4 – George Mogridge, 73, left-handed hurler who won 132 games over a 15-year MLB career between 1911 and 1927 with five teams, notably the 1915–1920 New York Yankees and 1921–1925 Washington Senators; key contributor to Senators' 1924 world champions.
- March 12 – Fred Beck, 75, first baseman/outfielder for Boston, Cincinnati and Philadelphia of the National League (1909–1911) and Chicago of the "outlaw" Federal League (1914–1915), whose ten home runs tied him for the NL long-ball championship in 1910.
- March 16
  - Sumpter Clarke, 64, outfielder who played 37 total games for 1920 Chicago Cubs and 1923–1924 Cleveland Indians.
  - Harry Feldman, 42, pitcher who worked in 143 games for the 1941–1946 New York Giants.
  - George Orme, 70, backup outfielder who played for the 1920 Boston Red Sox.
- March 17 – Kay Rohrer, 39, All-American Girls Professional Baseball League catcher for the 1945 Rockford Peaches champion team.
- March 18 – Elmer Bliss, 87, pitcher, then outfielder, in two total games for the New York Highlanders; in the former, he threw seven shutout innings against Detroit on September 28, 1903, to earn a relief victory; in the latter, he went 0-for-1 as a batter as a defensive replacement in right field against Cleveland on May 11, 1904.
- March 20 – John Black, 72, first baseman who batted but .151 in 54 games and 186 at-bats for the 1911 St. Louis Browns.
- March 22
  - Lee DeMontreville, 87, shortstop/second baseman for 1903 St. Louis Cardinals.
  - "Oyster Joe" Martina, 72, pitcher who went 349–277 in 833 career games in the minor leagues, but played only 24 games and one season (1924) in the majors as a member of the World Series champion Washington Senators.
  - Red Thomas, 63, outfielder who collected eight hits in 30 at-bats in eight games for the Chicago Cubs in September 1921.
- March 29 – Otto Miller, 72, catcher for the Brooklyn Dodgers/Superbas/Robins from 1910 to 1922, including two NL champions (1916, 1920).
- March 30
  - Charlie French, 78, second baseman/shortstop/outfielder who played 105 games for the Boston Red Sox and Chicago White Sox in 1909 and 1910.
  - Mutt Williams, 69, pitcher who hurled in six total games for the 1913–1914 Washington Senators.

=== April ===
- April 4 – Snooks Dowd, 64, infielder who appeared in 16 MLB games, chiefly as a pinch runner, for the Detroit Tigers and Philadelphia Athletics in 1919 and the Brooklyn Robins in 1926.
- April 5 – Vince Shupe, 40, first baseman for the 1945 Boston Braves, and one of many players who only appeared in the majors during World War II.
- April 10 – Milt Watson, 72, right-hander who pitched in 90 games from 1916 to 1919 for the St. Louis Cardinals and Philadelphia Phillies.
- April 13 – Bill Akers, 57, infielder for 1929–1931 Detroit Tigers and 1932 Boston Braves who got into 174 career games.
- April 21 – Bill Norman, 51, outfielder for the Chicago White Sox in 1931–1932, longtime minor league pilot, and manager of the Tigers from June 11, 1958 through May 2, 1959.
- April 23 – Bob Turner, 35, centerfielder for the 1944 Newark Eagles of the Negro National League.
- April 30
  - Al Demaree, 77, pitcher who won 80 games for four NL teams, later a noted sports cartoonist.
  - Russ Miller, 62, pitcher with the Philadelphia Phillies in 1927 and 1928; went 0–12 (5.42 ERA) in the latter season, and 1–13 (.071 winning percentage) lifetime.

=== May ===
- May 8 – Buster Burrell, 95, 19th-century catcher who played in 122 total games for the 1891 New York Giants and 1895–1897 Brooklyn Bridegrooms.
- May 10 – Lefty Willis, 56, pitcher for the Philadelphia Athletics from 1925 to 1927.
- May 23 – Rip Radcliff, 56, All-Star outfielder who batted .311 during his ten-season, 1,081-game career for the Chicago White Sox, St. Louis Browns and Detroit Tigers; led AL in hits in 1940.
- May 24
  - Barney Morris, 51, two-time All-Star pitcher in the Negro leagues between 1932 and 1948; member of 1947 Negro World Series champion New York Cubans.
  - Rabbit Nill, 80, infielder who appeared in 296 games between 1904 and 1908 for the Washington Senators and Cleveland Naps.
- May 28 – George Anderson, 72, outfielder for 1914–1915 Brooklyn Tip-Tops (Federal League) and 1918 St. Louis Cardinals, appearing in 269 total games.

=== June ===
- June 1 – Jim Faulkner, 62, left-hander who compiled a 10–8 won–lost mark (3.75 ERA) in 43 career games for the 1927–1928 New York Giants and 1930 Brooklyn Robins.
- June 2 – Art Stokes, 65, pitcher who appeared in a dozen games for 1925 Philadelphia Athletics.
- June 7 – George Shively, 69, Negro league baseball left fielder from 1910 to 1924.
- June 11
  - Bert Abbey, 92, 19th-century pitcher who hurled for Washington, Chicago and Brooklyn of the National League between 1892 and 1896.
  - Fred Dewitt, 61, first baseman/centerfielder who appeared for the Kansas City Monarchs, Cleveland Tigers and Memphis Red Sox of the Negro National League between 1927 and 1929.
  - Nap Kloza, 58, Polish-born outfielder for the St. Louis Browns in the early 1930s, later a manager for the AAGPBL Rockford Peaches.
- June 13 – Red Lanning, 67, outfielder and southpaw pitcher who appeared in 19 total games (six on the mound) for the horrendous 1916 Philadelphia Athletics, losers of 117 of 153 games.
- June 24 – Steve Basil, 69, American League umpire from 1936 to 1942 who worked 1,037 regular season games, the 1937 and 1940 World Series, and the 1938 and 1940 All-Star games.
- June 27 – Charlie Schmutz, 71, pitcher who made 19 appearances for the 1914–1915 Brooklyn Robins.
- June 28
  - Mickey Cochrane, 59, Hall of Fame catcher for Philadelphia Athletics (1925–1933) and Detroit Tigers (1934–1937); American League MVP in 1928 and 1934, and batted .320 lifetime; member of Philadelphia's 1929–1930 World Series champions who managed Tigers to the 1934 AL pennant and 1935 World Series title, posting a 348–250 (.582) record before stepping down on August 6, 1938.
  - Cy Morgan, 83, pitcher who spent a decade in the majors between 1903 and 1913 with four clubs, notably the 1909–1912 Athletics, where he was a member of their 1910–1911 World Series champions.

=== July ===
- July 1
  - Sam Mayer, 69, who appeared in 11 games, primarily as an outfielder, for the 1915 Washington Senators.
  - Ewing Waddy, 51, southpaw who went 2–7 hurling for the 1932 Indianapolis ABCs of the Negro Southern League and 1933 Indianapolis–Detroit Stars of the Negro National League.
- July 2 – Josh Clarke, 83, outfielder in 233 games over five major-league seasons between 1898 and 1911 for Louisville, St. Louis and Boston of the National League, and Cleveland of the American League.
- July 3 – Jimmy Walsh, 76, native of Ireland and outfielder for the 1916 Boston Red Sox world champions, who also hit better than .300 ten times in the International League, winning the league batting title in 1925 and 1926.
- July 4 – Abe Kruger, 77, pitcher who hurled in two contests for Brooklyn of the National League in 1908.
- July 9 – Moose McCormick, 81, outfielder who played in 429 games over five National League seasons for New York, Pittsburgh and Philadelphia between 1904 and 1913.
- July 12 – Mary Moore, 40, All-American Girls Professional Baseball League pitcher and member of the 1948 Rockford Peaches champion team.
- July 14 – Howard Craghead, 54, pitched for the Cleveland Indians in the 1931 and 1933 seasons.
- July 17 – Sport McAllister, 87, versatile, turn-of-the-century outfielder/infielder who appeared in 418 games, 415 of them with the Cleveland Spiders and Detroit Tigers, between 1896 and 1903.
- July 18 – Carl Holling, 66, pitched for the Detroit Tigers in the 1920s.
- July 20 – Donald Lee Barnes, 68, principal owner of the St. Louis Browns from 1936 to 1945; his 1944 Browns won that franchise's only American League pennant.
- July 23 – Ralph Shinners, 66, outfielder for the New York Giants and St. Louis Cardinals from 1922 to 1925, and later a manager in the AAGPBL.
- July 29 – Burt Shotton, 77, speedy outfielder who appeared in 1,387 games for the St. Louis Browns, Washington Senators and St. Louis Cardinals between 1909 and 1923; managed Brooklyn Dodgers to National League pennants in 1947 and 1949; also piloted Philadelphia Phillies from 1928 to 1933.

=== August ===
- August 3 – War Sanders, 85, left-handed hurler who went 2–8 (5.64 ERA) over 12 games pitched for the 1903–1904 St. Louis Cardinals.
- August 5 – Marilyn Monroe, 36, actress and former wife of Hall of Famer Joe DiMaggio.
- August 6 – Bob Williams, 78, backup catcher for the 1911–1913 New York Highlanders/Yankees who appeared in 46 career games.
- August 7 – Bill Pierce, 72, first baseman and catcher in Black baseball and the Negro leagues during the period of 1910 to 1924; player-manager of 1922 Baltimore Black Sox.
- August 11 – Jake Volz, 84, pitcher for the Boston Americans, Boston Beaneaters and Cincinnati Reds between 1901 and 1908.
- August 19 – Myron H. Wilson, 74, principal owner of the Cleveland Indians from 1952 to 1956 and club president from 1952 until his death.
- August 25 – Skipper Friday, 64, pitcher who appeared in seven games for 1923 Washington Senators.
- August 30 – Mutt Wilson, 66, pitcher in three games for 1920 Detroit Tigers; that season, he also compiled an unusual 23–21 won–lost record in 53 games in the lower minors.

=== September ===
- September 1
  - Hank Garrity, 54, catcher for the 1931 Chicago White Sox.
  - Duke Shirey, 64, pitcher for the 1920 Washington Senators.
- September 4 – Pete Washington, 59, centerfielder who played in the Negro leagues between 1923 and 1936.
- September 5 – John Potts, 75, appeared in 41 games as an outfielder and pinch hitter for Kansas City of the Federal League in 1914.
- September 10 – Bill Herring, 68, pitcher for the 1915 Brooklyn Tip-Tops of the Federal League.
- September 12 – Spottswood Poles, 74, star outfielder whose prime years (1909–1923) were spent in Black baseball before organization of the Negro leagues began in 1920; credited with a lifetime batting average of over .400, and sometimes called "the Black Ty Cobb," who played during the same era.
- September 18 – Joe Green, 84, player-manager of the 1920–1921 Chicago Giants of the Negro National League.
- September 23
  - Ted Stockard, 59, infielder for Cleveland (1927–1928) and Indianapolis (1931) of the Negro National League.
  - Tom Sullivan, 66, southpaw who pitched in three games for the Philadelphia Phillies in May 1922.
- September 24 – Joe Cambria, 72, Italian-born minor league player and club owner who became a pioneering scout covering Cuba for the Washington Senators/Minnesota Twins franchise from the 1930s until his death; signed stars Tony Oliva, Camilo Pascual and Zoilo Versalles, and many other MLB standouts.
- September 27
  - Johnny Scalzi, 55, minor-league second baseman who appeared in two games as a pinch hitter and pinch runner for 1931 Boston Braves.
  - Stan Sperry, 48, second baseman who played in 80 career games for the 1936 and 1938 Philadelphia Athletics.
- September 30
  - Cap Crowell, 70, pitcher who went 2–11 (5.27 ERA) in 19 total games for terrible Athletics teams of 1915 and 1916.
  - Cecil "Squiz" Pillion, 68, left-hander who also pitched for horrific 1915 Athletics, working in two August games.

=== October ===
- October 2 – Earl Yingling, 73, who appeared in 140 big-league games as a left-handed pitcher, outfielder and pinch hitter for four clubs, chiefly the Brooklyn Dodgers and Cincinnati Reds, over five seasons spanning 1911 to 1918.
- October 3 – Don Songer, 63, left-hander who pitched in 71 career games for the Pittsburgh Pirates and New York Giants from 1924 to 1927.
- October 5 – Jack Cummings, 58, good-hitting, seldom-used catcher/pinch hitter who batted .341 lifetime in 89 games and 151 plate appearances for 1926–1929 New York Giants and 1929 Boston Braves.
- October 6 – Dick Gossett, 72, catcher in 49 contests for the New York Yankees over all or parts of the 1913–1914 seasons.
- October 8 – Ralph Head, 69, right-hander who went 2–9 (6.66 ERA) in 35 games for 1923 Philadelphia Phillies.
- October 11
  - Bill Bell, 28, pitcher who worked in five total games for the Pittsburgh Pirates (1952, 1955); former minor-league phenom who threw three no-hitters in 15 starts for Bristol of the Class D Appalachian League earlier in 1952.
  - Dusty Decker, 50, shortstop/second baseman who played in the Negro leagues (1932, 1937) and was a star college football quarterback—nicknamed "The Human Catapult"—at historically black Fisk University.
- October 12 – Rube Geyer, 78, pitcher for the 1910–1913 St. Louis Cardinals.
- October 13 – Gus Hetling, 76, third baseman who appeared in two games for the Detroit Tigers in October 1906.
- October 15 – Possum Whitted, 72, utility man for 1914 "Miracle Boston Braves" World Series champions; appeared in 1,025 career games, primarily as an outfielder and third baseman, for the Braves, St. Louis Cardinals, Philadelphia Phillies, Pittsburgh Pirates and Brooklyn Robins between 1912 and 1922.
- October 16 – Ray Powell, 73, outfielder for 1913 Detroit Tigers and 1917–1924 Boston Braves; led National League in triples (18) in 1921.
- October 17 – Olaf Henriksen, 74, Boston Red Sox reserve outfielder (1911–1917) who was a member of three World Series champions (1912, 1915, 1916); as of 2022, the only MLB player to have been born in Denmark.
- October 20 – Tim Murchison, 66, southpaw pitcher who appeared in three total games for 1917 St. Louis Cardinals and 1920 Cleveland Indians, allowing only three hits and one unearned run in six innings of work; longtime scout.
- October 23 – Elbert Norman, 65, shortstop for the 1927 Cleveland Elites of the Negro National League.
- October 31 – Larry Goetz, 67, National League umpire from 1936 to 1956, worked in 3,225 NL contests, three World Series and two All-Star Games.

=== November ===
- November 12 – Harvey Smith, 91, third baseman who appeared in 36 games for the 1896 Washington Senators of the National League.
- November 14 – Dick Hoblitzel, 74, first baseman on Red Sox champions of 1915–1916.
- November 16 – Hugh High, 75, outfielder for the Detroit Tigers and New York Yankees between 1913–1918; brother of Andy and Charlie High.
- November 18 – Ed Moyer, 77, pitcher in six games for the 1910 Washington Senators.
- November 21 – Whitey Hilcher, 53, pitcher who appeared in 31 games for the Cincinnati Reds over four seasons spanning 1931 to 1936.
- November 26 – Al Carson, 80, pitcher who appeared in two games for the Chicago Cubs in May 1910.
- November 27 – Bob Peterson, 78, catcher for the Boston Americans between 1906 and 1907.
- November 28 – Harry Moran, 73, left-hander who appeared in 68 games for Buffalo (1914) and Newark (1915) of the "outlaw" Federal League; earlier, hurled in five contests for the 1912 Detroit Tigers.
- November 29 – Red Kress, 55, coach for the 1962 New York Mets; also coached for Detroit Tigers, New York Giants, Cleveland Indians and Los Angeles Angels for 14 seasons between 1940 and 1961; previously an AL shortstop during the 1930s.

=== December ===
- December 1 – Owen Smaulding, 65, World War I veteran and standout Black athlete who played on integrated sports teams at the University of Washington and University of Idaho and pitched for the Kansas City Monarchs, Chicago American Giants, Cleveland Tigers and Birmingham Black Barons of the Negro National League in 1927–1928; became a teacher after his playing career.
- December 2
  - Frank Kane, 67, outfielder and pinch hitter for the 1915 Brooklyn Tip-Tops (Federal League) and 1919 New York Yankees.
  - John Scott, 75, shortstop for the 1914 Pittsburgh Rebels of the Federal League.
- December 3 – George Scott, 67, pitcher who worked in two games for the 1920 St. Louis Cardinals.
- December 4
  - Ben Cantwell, 60, pitcher for New York Giants, Boston Braves/Bees, and Brooklyn Dodgers who appeared in 316 games between 1927 and 1937; won 20 games, losing ten, for 1933 Braves squad, then, two years later posted a 4–25 won–lost record pitching for a horrendous Boston club that lost 115 of its 153 games played.
  - John Joseph Coffee, alias Jack Smith, 69, one of the replacement amateur players called into action by the Detroit Tigers when the team staged a wildcat strike in support of the suspended Ty Cobb on May 18, 1912; "Smith" played errorless ball at third base for two innings of Detroit's 24–2 loss to Philadelphia, but did not record a plate appearance.
- December 6 – Dutch Hoffman, 58, Chicago White Sox' centerfielder during the 1929 season, appearing in 107 games.
- December 7
  - Bobo Newsom, 55, colorful, much-traveled All-Star pitcher who won 211 games with nine different teams between 1929 and 1953, including five stints with the Washington Senators; starred in a losing cause for the Detroit Tigers in the 1940 World Series; three-time 20-game winner (1938 through 1940) and three-time 20-game loser (1934, 1941, 1945).
  - J. G. Taylor Spink, 74, publisher and editor of The Sporting News since 1914 and a tireless champion of the sport.
- December 8 – Bill Gatewood, 81, Negro leagues pitcher who appeared for as many as 21 teams over a 24-year span (1906–1929); led Negro National League in games won (15) in 1920.
- December 14
  - Bob Katz, 51, pitcher who made six appearances for the wartime-era 1944 Cincinnati Reds.
  - Champ Osteen, 85, infielder who played in 83 career games for the 1903 Washington Senators, 1904 New York Highlanders and 1908–1909 St. Louis Cardinals.
  - Dan Woodman, 69, pitcher who appeared in 18 contests for Buffalo of the Federal League in 1914–1915.
- December 20 – Charlie Luskey, 86, outfielder/catcher in 11 games for the American League's maiden 1901 edition of the Washington Senators.
- December 27 – Jake Flowers, 60, infielder between 1923 and 1934 for three National League teams; later an MLB coach.
- December 29 – Tiny Graham, 70, 6 ft 2 in (1.88 m)-tall first baseman who played 25 games for 1914 Cincinnati Reds.
- December 30 – Joe Boley, 66, shortstop for the Philadelphia Athletics (1927–1932) and Cleveland Indians (1932); key contributor to Philadelphia's 1929 and 1930 world championships and 1931 American League title.
- December 31
  - Al Mamaux, 68, pitcher who posted back-to-back 20-plus win seasons for the 1915–1916 Pittsburgh Pirates; also hurled for the Brooklyn Robins and New York Yankees during his 12 seasons in MLB.
  - Del Mason, 79, right-hander who compiled a 5–16 (3.72) career record in 32 total games for the 1904 Washington Senators and 1906–1907 Cincinnati Reds.
