= Dick Stuart =

American baseball player (1932–2002)

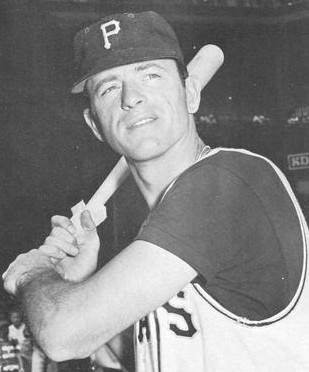
- First baseman
- Born: November 7, 1932; San Francisco, California, U.S.
- Died: December 15, 2002 (aged 70); Redwood City, California, U.S.
- Batted: Right Threw: Right

Professional debut
- MLB: July 10, 1958, for the Pittsburgh Pirates
- NPB: 1967, for the Taiyo Whales

Last appearance
- NPB: 1968, for the Taiyo Whales
- MLB: May 27, 1969, for the California Angels

MLB statistics
- Batting average: .264
- Home runs: 228
- Runs batted in: 743
- Stats at Baseball Reference

Teams
- Pittsburgh Pirates (1958–1962); Boston Red Sox (1963–1964); Philadelphia Phillies (1965); New York Mets (1966); Los Angeles Dodgers (1966); Taiyo Whales (1967–1968); California Angels (1969)

Career highlights and awards
- 2× All-Star (1961, 1961²); World Series champion (1960); AL RBI leader (1963)

Richard Lee Stuart (November 7, 1932 – December 15, 2002), nicknamed "Dr. Strangeglove", was an American professional baseball player. He played in Major League Baseball (MLB) as a first baseman from 1958 to 1966 then, played in the Nippon Professional Baseball (NPB) league from 1967 to 1968 before returning to play one final season in MLB in 1969.

A two-time All-Star player, Stuart was notable for being an integral member of the 1960 Pittsburgh Pirates team which upset the New York Yankees to win the 1960 World Series and, for being the 1963 American League RBI champion. Stuart threw and batted right-handed; during his playing days, he stood 6 feet 4 inches (1.93 m) tall, weighing 212 pounds (96 kg).

== Early years ==
Stuart was born in San Francisco, California, although his family soon relocated to San Carlos and attended Sequoia High School in neighboring Redwood City. Stuart declined two scholarships to play college baseball when he signed with the Pittsburgh Pirates in June 1951 for a $10,000 bonus. The outfielder soon emerged as one of the top sluggers in their farm system. He batted .313, and clubbed a Pioneer League leading 31 home runs with the Billings Mustangs in 1952. He also led the league in runs batted in (121), runs (115) and total bases (292).

His minor league career was interrupted by a stint in the United States Army in 1953 and 1954. After initially sputtering upon his return to professional baseball in 1955, Stuart set a Western League record with 66 home runs in 1956 with the Lincoln Chiefs. Equally stunning was his league leading 171 strikeouts.

His fielding also proved to be something of a liability. The Pirates unsuccessfully tried him at third base with the Atlanta Crackers in 1957 before shifting him to first base in 1958. Stuart clubbed 31 home runs in 80 games for the Salt Lake City Bees when he received his call to the majors in July.

== Pittsburgh Pirates ==
Stuart made his major league debut with the Pirates on July 10, 1958, at the age of 25. With the Pirates trailing 8–5, Stuart hit a two-run home run in the ninth inning of his major league debut to bring his team within a run. The following day, he hit a grand slam off Moe Drabowsky to lead his team to a 7–2 victory over the Chicago Cubs. Over the remainder of the season, Stuart would bat .268 with 48 RBIs. Despite being called up halfway through the season, and being used in a lefty/righty platoon with Ted Kluszewski, Stuart's sixteen home runs was third best on the team. He also led the league in errors committed by a first baseman (16) for the first of seven consecutive years.

He was again in a platoon with Kluszewski in 1959, and was batting .294 with nineteen home runs and sixty RBIs when the Pirates dealt Kluszewski to the Chicago White Sox on August 25. As the Pirates' full time first baseman, Stuart improved to .307 with eight home runs and nineteen RBIs. His 27 home runs and 78 RBIs led the team, while his .297 batting average tied for the team lead with catcher Smoky Burgess. His .976 fielding percentage was the lowest for a National League first baseman since Fred Luderus' .975 in 1914.

Fueled by an MVP season from shortstop Dick Groat, and the emergence of young star Roberto Clemente, the 1960 Pirates sailed to the NL pennant by seven games over the Milwaukee Braves. In their 1960 World Series victory over the New York Yankees, Stuart was held to three singles in twenty at bats with no RBIs or runs scored. Stuart was in the on deck circle as a pinch hitter when Bill Mazeroski hit the ninth-inning home run off Ralph Terry that won the World Series.

His poor performance in the World Series preceded what would be his finest season in 1961. There were two All-Star games in 1961; Stuart was part of both NL squads. In the July 11 game at Candlestick Park, Stuart doubled in his only at bat. in the July 31 contest at Fenway Park, Stuart grounded out in his only at bat. His 35 home runs and 117 RBIs far and away led the Pirates, while he batted over .300 for the only time in his career (.301). He also led the NL with 121 strikeouts.

Following a slow start to his 1962 season, Stuart found himself losing playing time to rookie prospect Donn Clendenon. After the season, Stuart and pitcher Jack Lamabe were traded to the Boston Red Sox for Jim Pagliaroni and Don Schwall.

== Boston Red Sox ==
Stuart's physical resemblance to Red Sox legend Ted Williams immediately endeared him to fans. Endearing him even more to Bosox fans was that through the first 26 games of the 1963 season, Stuart had five home runs and seventeen RBIs without committing an error. That streak ended abruptly, when Stuart had errors in both games of a May 15 doubleheader with the Los Angeles Angels. His .253 batting average, seventeen home runs and fifty RBIs at the All-Star break earned him a second-place finish to the Yankees' Joe Pepitone in fan balloting, but he was left off the team by American League manager Ralph Houk. He was, however, named the first baseman on the Sporting News' AL All-Star Team.

He would earn a degree of revenge on Houk on August 15, when he hit his thirtieth home run of the season, making him the first player to hit thirty home runs in a season in both the NL and the AL. For the season, he would finish second to the Minnesota Twins' Harmon Killebrew in the AL home run race (42 to 45). While he would go on to lead the AL with 118 RBIs and 319 total bases, he would also lead major league first basemen with 29 errors, which remains both Stuart's career high and the Boston Red Sox single season record. By season's end, he had been dubbed "Stone Fingers" by none other than Hank Aaron. Despite his well-documented defensive struggles, on June 28, Stuart became the initial first-baseman in major league history to record three assists in one inning.

The following season, Stuart would become far better known as "Dr. Strangeglove", a play on the popular 1964 film Dr. Strangelove. Despite his 24 errors at first, Stuart still mashed with the best of them. He hit 33 home runs and was second in the AL (to the Baltimore Orioles' Brooks Robinson) with 114 RBIs.

== Philadelphia Phillies ==
In need of starting pitching, the Red Sox dealt Stuart to the Philadelphia Phillies at the start of the Winter meetings for left hander Dennis Bennett. Following a 6-for-14 four game series in Los Angeles against the Dodgers, Stuart raised his batting average to .297. He followed that up with an 0-for-14 slump that saw his average drop to .216, and drew the ire of manager Gene Mauch. Stuart batted .234 with 28 home runs and 95 RBIs in his only season in Philadelphia.

On October 27, 1965 the Phillies acquired Gold Glove first baseman Bill White, Bob Uecker and Stuart's former Pirates teammate Dick Groat from the St. Louis Cardinals for Pat Corrales, Alex Johnson and Art Mahaffey. Four months later, Stuart was traded to the New York Mets for minor leaguers Wayne Graham, Bobby Klaus and Jimmie Schaffer.

== 1966 season ==
The Mets moved 21 year old All-Star Ed Kranepool into a left field platoon with Ron Swoboda in order to make room for Stuart at first base. However, once Kranepool demonstrated he was a terrible left fielder, and Stuart committed six errors by June 5, that disastrous idea was abandoned. The Mets released Stuart on June 15 with a .218 average, four home runs and thirteen RBIs. Shortly afterwards, he went from worst to first, signing as a free agent with the Los Angeles Dodgers. Though his role with the Dodgers was far more limited than Stuart was used to in his major league career, he returned to the post season for only the second time in his career. He appeared as a pinch hitter in games one and four of the 1966 World Series against the Baltimore Orioles, flying out to deep right center in game one, and striking out in Game Four. The Dodgers were swept by the Orioles, losing in four straight games as Stuart went hitless.

== Taiyo Whales ==
Prior to his trade to the Mets, Stuart seriously considered playing in Japan. With no Major League offers on the table for the 1967 season, he signed with Nippon Professional Baseball's Taiyo Whales. After an impressive first season with the Whales (.280 avg., 33 HR, 79 RBI), Stuart dipped to a .217 average, with sixteen home runs and forty RBIs his second season. He became known as "Moby Dick" while playing in Japan.

He returned to the major leagues with the California Angels in 1969, but after 22 games in which he batted .157 with just one home run, he was released on June 3. He finished out the season with the Pacific Coast League's Phoenix Giants before retiring at the age of 36.

== Career statistics ==
Games	PA	AB	Runs	Hits	2B	3B	HR	RBI	SB	BB	SO	HBP	Avg.	Slg.	Fld%
1112	4363	3997	506	1055	157	30	228	743	2	301	957	22	.264	.489	.982

In January 1973, almost four years after Stuart's retirement, it was noted that the not yet instituted designated hitter rule "would have suited Dr. Strangeglove perfectly". Other, less well known but equally unflattering nicknames included "Iron Glove" and, in a more literary vein, "The Ancient Mariner", a reference to the first lines of the Samuel Taylor Coleridge poem The Rime of the Ancient Mariner: "It is an ancient Mariner, / And he stoppeth one of three".

In their book, The Great American Baseball Card Flipping, Trading and Bubble Gum Book, Brendan C. Boyd and Fred C. Harris wrote an essay on Stuart's notoriously poor fielding. An excerpt: "Every play hit his way was an adventure, the most routine play a challenge to his artlessness. It is hard to describe this to anyone who has not seen it, just as it is hard to describe Xavier Cugat or Allen Ludden. Stu once picked up a hot dog wrapper that was blowing toward his first base position. He received a standing ovation from the crowd. It was the first thing he had managed to pick up all day, and the fans realized it could very well be the last".

== Personal life and death ==
Stuart had a daughter, Debbie Lea, from his first marriage, and two sons, Richard Lee Jr. and Robert Lance from his second marriage to Lois. He was a member of the Screen Guild Extra Union, and appeared as an extra in the film D-Day the Sixth of June, and on the television shows Navy Log and Badge 714. While with the Red Sox, Stuart began doing a sports TV show entitled Stuart on Sports Sunday nights after the news. He also hosted like-named shows while with the Phillies and Mets.

Stuart died of cancer on December 15, 2002, in Redwood City, California at the age of 70.

== See also ==
- List of Major League Baseball career home run leaders
