= Tony Ferreira =

Tony Ferreira may refer to:

- Tony Ferreira (actor) (1943–1994), Brazilian actor
- Tony Ferreira (baseball) (born 1962), former Major League Baseball pitcher
