= Don Schwall =

American baseball player (born 1936)

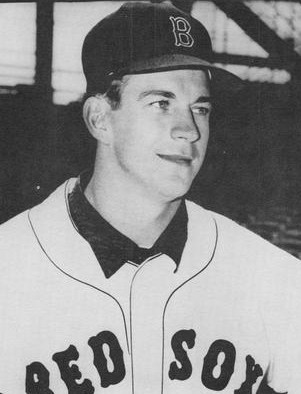
- Schwall in 1962
- Pitcher
- Born: March 2, 1936 (age 90); Hanover Township, Luzerne County, Pennsylvania, U.S.
- Batted: Right Threw: Right

MLB debut
- May 21, 1961, for the Boston Red Sox

Last MLB appearance
- April 12, 1967, for the Atlanta Braves

MLB statistics
- Win–loss record: 49–48
- Earned run average: 3.72
- Strikeouts: 408
- Stats at Baseball Reference

Teams
- Boston Red Sox (1961–1962); Pittsburgh Pirates (1963–1966); Atlanta Braves (1966–1967)

Career highlights and awards
- All-Star (1961²); AL Rookie of the Year (1961)

Donald Bernard Schwall (born March 2, 1936) is an American former professional baseball pitcher player who played seven seasons in Major League Baseball (MLB). Initially drafted by the Boston Red Sox, he spent four seasons with the Pittsburgh Pirates, before ending his career with the Atlanta Braves.

== Early life and college ==
Schwall was born on March 2, 1936, in Hanover Township, Luzerne County, Pennsylvania, a bordering suburb of Wilkes-Barre, Pennsylvania. It has been mistakenly reported in some places he was born in neighboring Wilkes-Barre.

He attended Ypsilanti High School in Ypsilanti, Michigan, graduating in 1954. He played on the basketball team from 1952 to 1954, which was his principal high school sport, and was one of the state's top scorers. At Ypsilanti, he was All-State in basketball and baseball, and honorable mention for All-State in football. In 2007, he was inducted into Ypsilanti Athletic Hall of Fame.

== College ==
The 6 ft 4 in (1.93 m) or 6 ft 6 in (1.98 m) Schwall attended the University of Oklahoma on a basketball and baseball scholarship, starting in 1955. Schwall's brother John was an Air Force captain stationed in Oklahoma, and had told the Sooner's baseball coach about Schwall's athletic prowess in high school.

=== Basketball ===
As a sophomore (1956-57), Schwall set a school scoring record for basketball. In 1957, he was named by the Associated Press (AP) as second-team All-Big Seven, and he also received considerable support in United Press International's (UPI) All-Big Seven voting. Another sophomore who received significant consideration in the UPI's Big Seven poll that year was the University of Missouri's Sonny Siebert, who would go on to pitch in major league baseball like Schwall.

For the 1956-57 season, Schwall was 7th in the Big Seven in scoring, averaging 16 points per game, and 6th in rebounding, averaging 8.7 rebounds per game. Schwall could no longer compete in the 1957-58 basketball season, however, after signing a baseball contract with the Boston Red Sox in December 1957.

=== Wilt Chamberlain ===
At the same time he was a sophomore at Oklahoma, future NBA Hall of Fame center Wilt Chamberlain was a sophomore at the University of Kansas, with both Oklahoma and Kansas being members of the then Big Seven. Schwall faced off against Chamberlain's Kansas teams three times while playing for the Sooners, totaling 73 points to Chamberlain's 69 points. In a late December 1956 game, Schwall led Oklahoma with 23 points in a loss to Kansas (56–74), though he fouled out along with two other teammates. Chamberlain scored 36 points and had 22 rebounds with a large number of blocked shots. In a January 7, 1957 rematch, Chamberlain scored 22 points and Schwall 20, in a 59–51 Kansas win. On February 18, 1957, Schwall scored 30 points and Chamberlain only 11 points, in another Kansas win over Oklahoma (76–56). Chamberlain fouled out with almost nine minutes left in the game (something he never did in over 1,000 NBA games).

=== Summer baseball ===
Schwall played Ban Johnson League baseball between his freshman and sophomore years. Between his sophomore and junior years, Schwall played semi-pro baseball for Mitchell, South Dakota, in the Basin League, where he pitched a no-hitter. He played well enough to draw the interest of 15 major league baseball teams. Schwall only played sparingly for Oklahoma as a collegian.

=== Delayed graduation ===
Schwall continued with his education at Oklahoma, even after he began playing professional baseball. He attended school in the fall semester, while playing baseball in the spring and summer. In the fall of 1961, he completed his classwork and student teaching obligations to obtain a degree in business education, at 23-years old. Although Schwall completed his coursework, a clerical error caused Schwall to never receive his degree. The oversight went unnoticed for decades until 2018 when at the age of 82, Schwall contacted the University of Oklahoma about it. The university acknowledged the oversight and had Schwall attend that year's graduation, 57 years late. He was seated on the graduation stage, and was given a separate introduction by the dean; receiving a standing ovation from those present.

== Professional baseball ==
Schwall signed with the Red Sox in late 1957 as an amateur free agent. He had first been scouted by the Red Sox Wog Rice, and was signed by Rice once he decided to play professional baseball. After signing Schwall, Rice stated it was the largest signing bonus paid to an Oklahoman at the time.

=== Minor leagues ===
Schwall played in the Red Sox minor league system from 1958 to 1960. In 1958, he pitched in Class D baseball for the Waterloo Hawks, with a 7–5 won–loss record and 4.68 earned run average (ERA). He played Class D ball again in 1959, for the Alpine Cowboys, but improved dramatically with a 23–6 record and 3.36 ERA. He won another three games for Alpine in the playoffs. The Red Sox promoted him all the way to the Triple-A Minneapolis Millers in 1960, where he went 16–9, with a 3.59 ERA.

=== Boston Red Sox ===
In 1961, Schwall pitched in five games for the Triple-A Seattle Rainiers, but was called up to the Red Sox less than two months into the season, and spent the majority of the season on the Red Sox. In his first game on May 21, 1961, against the Chicago White Sox, Schwall pitched eight innings, giving up only six hits and one run in his first major league start and victory. His next game was a complete game 5–0 shutout against the Baltimore Orioles, where he struck out former Oklahoma State basketball adversary Jerry Adair four times. Schwall won his first six decisions, with a 2.09 ERA, before losing a game. His record was 13–2 by mid-August when he had to miss two weeks of play with a kidney ailment.

While Schwall did come back in 1961, he never regained his earlier form and finished the season with a 15–7 record with 91 strikeouts and a 3.22 ERA, for a Boston team that finished 33 games out of first place and ten games under .500. Before the kidney problem struck him, Schwall was selected to the American League team for the second 1961 All-Star game, played at Boston's Fenway Park on July 31. Schwall pitched the middle three innings for the American League, the game ending in a 1–1 tie when it was stopped in the ninth inning due to rain. It was the first All-Star game tie in major league baseball history. Even though he won the Rookie of the Year award in 1961, Schwall said his biggest thrill as a rookie was striking out Stan Musial in the All-Star Game.

=== Rookie of the year ===
Schwall won American League Rookie of the Year honors. He received more votes than rookie teammate Chuck Schilling, who was tied for third in the voting. Another rookie teammate, future Hall of Fame outfielder Carl Yastrzemski, did not receive any votes. He and Yastrzemski were teammates in Minneapolis and roommates in Boston during their rookie year. Schwall was the second Red Sox player to be named the AL Rookie of the Year, joining Walter Dropo (1950), and later joined by Carlton Fisk (1972), Fred Lynn (1975), Nomar Garciaparra (1997), and Dustin Pedroia (2007). He also came in 14th in Most Valuable Player (MVP) voting that year.

=== Pittsburgh Pirates ===
After a sub-par 1962 season for the Red Sox, with a 9–15 record and 4.95 ERA, Schwall was sent to Pittsburgh. He and catcher Jim Pagliaroni were traded to the Pirates for first baseman Dick Stuart and pitcher Jack Lamabe. He went 6–12 in 1963, but with a solid 3.32 ERA, pitching mostly as a starter. In 1964, his season went awry when he was hit in the knee by a line-drive. A sore arm followed, and he was sent to the Triple-A Columbus Jets to work on his arm strength. He pitched less than 50 innings for the Pirates that year (4–3, 4.35 ERA), and started 12 games in Columbus, with a 2–6 record and 4.83 ERA.

In 1965, the Pirates made Schwall a reliever, to replace the injured Elroy Face. He pitched 42 games in relief, starting only one game, and recorded a career-best 2.92 ERA while winning nine games. In 1966, the Pirates went back to using him as both a starter and relief pitcher. The Pirates traded him to the Braves on June 15, 1966 for left-handed pitcher Billy O'Dell. His first game for the Braves came against the Pirates. Former teammate Roberto Clemente hit a line-drive off Schwall's hand that caused him to miss two months of play. He changed his pitching motion thereafter, hastening his decline as a pitcher. Schwall finished his career with Atlanta early in the next season.

In seven seasons, Schwall compiled a 49–48 record with 408 strikeouts, a 3.72 ERA, 18 complete games, five shutouts, four saves, and 743 innings pitched in 172 games (103 as a starter).

== Personal life ==
After leaving baseball, Schwall pursued a career as an investment banker. A friend of Bob Prince, Schwall managed Prince's charitable endeavors in the years after his death. Schwall continued to pursue his college education after becoming a professional baseball player, but never received his degree. In early 2018, he contacted the University of Oklahoma and was informed that he had completed his graduation requirements in 1961. He attended the school's May 2018 graduation ceremonies and received his diploma.
