= Jim Pagliaroni =

American baseball player (1937–2010)

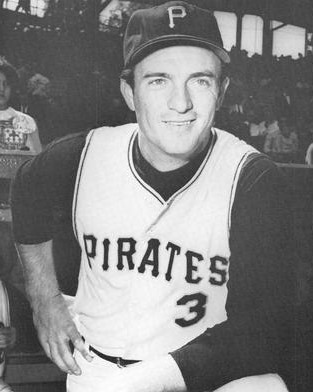
- Catcher
- Born: December 8, 1937; Dearborn, Michigan, U.S.
- Died: April 3, 2010 (aged 72); Grass Valley, California, U.S.
- Batted: Right Threw: Right

MLB debut
- August 13, 1955, for the Boston Red Sox

Last MLB appearance
- September 30, 1969, for the Seattle Pilots

MLB statistics
- Batting average: .252
- Home runs: 90
- Runs batted in: 326
- Stats at Baseball Reference

Teams
- Boston Red Sox (1955, 1960–1962); Pittsburgh Pirates (1963–1967); Oakland Athletics (1968–1969); Seattle Pilots (1969)

James Vincent "Pag" Pagliaroni (December 8, 1937 – April 3, 2010) was an American professional baseball player. He played in Major League Baseball as a catcher from 1955 to 1969 for the Boston Red Sox, Pittsburgh Pirates, Oakland Athletics and the Seattle Pilots.

== Playing career ==
Pagliaroni was born in Dearborn, Michigan, and grew up in Long Beach, California where, he was contracted by the Boston Red Sox as an amateur free agent out of Wilson High School in 1955. He was only 17 years old when he made his debut with the Red Sox that same year. Although he didn't get much opportunity to play during his first season, he received valuable instruction from former catcher, Mickey Owen. Pagliaroni then joined the United States Army from 1956 to 1958, when he was discharged in time to report to spring training with the Red Sox. Pagliaroni spent the next three seasons playing in the minor leagues before rejoining the Red Sox in August 1960. He was standing in the on deck circle during a game at Fenway Park on September 28, 1960, when Ted Williams hit a home run in his final at bat in the major leagues.

In 1961, Pagliaroni appeared in 120 games, more than any other Red Sox catcher and posted a .242 batting average with 16 home runs and 58 runs batted in. Pagliaroni was the hitting standout on June 18, 1961 when he hit a grand slam home run to tie the game as the Red Sox rallied from eight runs down with two outs in the ninth inning to defeat the Washington Senators. Pagliaroni shared catching duties in 1962 with Russ Nixon and Bob Tillman. He once again led the Red Sox catchers in games played with 90, and batted .258 with 11 home runs and 37 RBI. He was the Red Sox catcher on August 1, 1962 when Bill Monbouquette threw a no-hitter against the Chicago White Sox.

On November 20, 1962, Pagliaroni was traded by the Red Sox along with Don Schwall to the Pittsburgh Pirates for Jack Lamabe and Dick Stuart. When the Pirates' regular catcher, Smoky Burgess, was sidelined by an injury, Pagliaroni alternated with catcher Ron Brand to fulfill the catching duties. Pagliaroni himself was injured in June when, a fractured ring finger on his right hand made him miss three weeks of the season. He ended the 1963 season with a .230 batting average, 11 home runs and 26 RBI in 92 games.

In 1964, Pagliaroni would catch the majority of the Pirates' games, as the 36-year-old Burgess was used mostly as a pinch hitter. He produced a .295 batting average along with 10 home runs and 36 RBI in 97 games. Defensively, he ranked third among National League catchers in fielding percentage. Pagliaroni set a Pirates team record for catchers when he hit a career-high 17 home runs in 1965 while playing his home games at the cavernous Forbes Field. He also produced a career-high 65 RBI and finished second among the league's catchers in fielding percentage, helping the Pirates to a third-place finish in the National League.

In July 1966, as the Pirates were battling for the lead in the National League, Pagliaroni denied a story that he had struck Pirates manager Harry Walker and had been fined $1,000. Pagliaroni later sued Maury Allen, the sportswriter who had written the story, for $1 million. The Pirates team which included future Baseball Hall of Fame members Roberto Clemente, Bill Mazeroski and Willie Stargell, as well as the National League batting champion Matty Alou, fought the Los Angeles Dodgers and San Francisco Giants in a tight pennant race in 1966, holding first place on September 10, before faltering to finish the season in third place for a second consecutive year. Pagliaroni faded towards the end of the season as his batting average dipped to .235, and Jesse Gonder became the primary catcher. Pagliaroni finished the 1966 season leading National League catchers with a .997 fielding percentage, committing only two errors in 118 games.

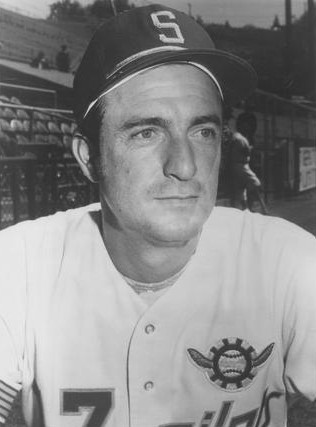
Pagliaroni with the Seattle Pilots in 1969

In May 1967, reports surfaced that Pagliaroni was asking to be traded, citing criticism his catching abilities had received from unnamed sources. He appeared in only 38 games with a .200 batting average for the Pirates in 1967, while Jerry May took over as the regular catcher. On December 3, 1967, Pagliaroni's contract was purchased by the Oakland Athletics from the Pirates. The Pirates stated that Pagliaroni was sold due to his physical condition, having undergone an operation to remove a disc from his spine.

Pagliaroni won the Athletics' starting catchers job at the beginning of the 1968 season and caught Catfish Hunter's perfect game on May 8 of that year, the first perfect game in the American League since 1922. Hunter only disagreed with Pagliaroni's pitch-calling decisions twice during the game. As a measure of his appreciation for his catcher's contribution to the perfect game, Hunter rewarded Pagliaroni with a gold watch that he had inscribed on back. He suffered a fractured wrist in June causing him to miss seven weeks of the season.

Pagliaroni began the 1969 season hitting for just a .148 batting average and on May 27, 1969, his contract was sold to the Seattle Pilots during their inaugural season as a major league team. He shared catching duties with Jerry McNertney in the season immortalized by the book Ball Four, written by his Seattle teammate, Jim Bouton. Pagliaroni later wrote Bouton that he had loved his infamously candid best-seller, and if there ever was a "Ball Four" movie, he would want to play himself, noting that he'd "be perfect for the part of a 'deranged, perverted, moral degenerate, iconoclastic, loving husband and father.' "

Pagliaroni played in his final major league game on September 30, 1969 at the age of 31.

== Career statistics ==
In an eleven-year major league career, Pagliaroni played in 849 games, accumulating 622 hits in 2,465 at bats for a .252 career batting average, along with 90 home runs, 326 runs batted in and an on-base percentage of .344. He had a career fielding percentage of .991 which was 3 points above the average during his playing career. His teammates elected him to be the Players' Representative to the Players Union for both the Pittsburgh Pirates and the Oakland Athletics.

== Later life ==
Pagliaroni later became an executive with a food distribution company. He also helped raise funds for the Jim "Catfish" Hunter ALS Foundation to help honor Hunter, who died of amyotrophic lateral sclerosis, or Lou Gehrig's disease, in 1999.

On April 3, 2010, Pagliaroni died of cancer in Grass Valley, California.
