= Jack Lamabe =

American baseball player (1936–2007)

- Pitcher
- Born: October 3, 1936; Farmingdale, New York, U.S.
- Died: December 21, 2007 (aged 71); Baton Rouge, Louisiana, U.S.
- Batted: Right Threw: Right

MLB debut
- April 17, 1962, for the Pittsburgh Pirates

Last MLB appearance
- September 22, 1968, for the Chicago Cubs

MLB statistics
- Win–loss record: 33–41
- Earned run average: 4.24
- Strikeouts: 434
- Stats at Baseball Reference

Teams
- Pittsburgh Pirates (1962); Boston Red Sox (1963–1965); Houston Astros (1965); Chicago White Sox (1966–1967); New York Mets (1967); St. Louis Cardinals (1967); Chicago Cubs (1968)

Career highlights and awards
- World Series champion (1967)

John Alexander Lamabe (October 3, 1936 – December 21, 2007) was an American professional baseball right-handed pitcher. He was a member of the 1967 World Series champion St. Louis Cardinals. Following his playing career, Lamabe became a minor league coach with the Montreal Expos before becoming a very successful college baseball coach with Jacksonville University and Louisiana State University.

== Early years ==
Lamabe was born in Farmingdale, New York, and was teammates with former Major League Baseball infielder Al Weis on the Farmingdale High School baseball team (with whom he would play again with the Chicago White Sox in 1966 & 1967). After two years at the University of Vermont, where he played baseball and basketball, Lamabe signed with the Philadelphia Phillies on June 26, 1956. He pitched one season with their Carolina League affiliate, the Wilson Tobs, going 3–7 with a 2.75 earned run average. After which, Commissioner Ford Frick declared Lamabe a free agent on the grounds that he was ineligible to sign such a contract while attending UVM. Shortly afterwards, he signed with the Pittsburgh Pirates.

== Pittsburgh Pirates ==
Lamabe was 41–44 with a 3.92 ERA over five seasons in the Pirates' farm system when he earned a job in the Bucs' bullpen out of Spring training 1962. He made his major league debut on April 17 against the Chicago Cubs. After starter Tom Sturdivant allowed five earned runs in one inning, Lamabe pitched four scoreless innings, scattering three hits. Two days later, he earned his first career save against the Phillies. After seventeen appearances with a 2.06 ERA, Labame earned his first career win on June 15 against the Milwaukee Braves. All told, Lamabe was 3–1 with two saves and a 2.88 ERA his only season in Pittsburgh. In the off-season, he and first baseman Dick Stuart were traded to the Boston Red Sox for Jim Pagliaroni and Don Schwall.

== Boston Red Sox ==
Lamabe had a career year his first season in Boston. He was 7–3 with a career high six saves and 3.23 ERA as a reliever, also making two spot starts. Lamabe also hit his only career home run, off the New York Yankees' Bill Stafford, on August 14, 1963.

In 1964, Bosox manager Johnny Pesky moved Lamabe into the starting rotation. After winning his first three decisions, Lamabe began to sputter in his new role, going 5–11 with a 6.42 ERA the rest of the way. He also became ineffective as a reliever, going 1–2, and allowing 22 earned runs in 24.1 innings pitched. The ineffectiveness continued into 1965. Lamabe was 0–3 with an 8.17 ERA when he was demoted to the Triple A Toronto Maple Leafs. At the end of the International League season, he was traded to the Houston Astros for Bucky Brandon. He made three appearances (two starts) with the Astros, and was 0–2 with a 4.26 ERA. During the Winter meetings, Lamabe and minor leaguer Raymond Cordeiro were traded to the Chicago White Sox for Bill Heath and Dave Nicholson.

== Chicago White Sox ==
After beginning the 1966 season in the bullpen, Lamabe was moved into the starting rotation in late May. He hurled shutouts in both of his first two starts against the Red Sox and Washington Senators. He remained a starter through the All-Star break. After which, he split his time evenly in both roles.

== World Series champion ==
Thirteen games into the 1967 season, Lamabe was shipped to the New York Mets as part of a conditional deal. He was 0–3 with a 3.98 ERA for the Mets when he went from worst to first. Between games of a July 16 doubleheader with the St. Louis Cardinals, the last place Mets sent Lamabe to the first place Cardinals for a player to be named later. Lamabe was the losing pitcher in the second game of the doubleheader. After a second consecutive loss in his second appearance as a Cardinal, Lamabe improved substantially. He went 3–2 with four saves and a stellar 1.99 ERA.

That October, the Cards faced Lamabe's former franchise, the Boston Red Sox in the World Series. While the Cards won the World Series in seven games, Lamabe appeared in all three losses, losing game six.

== Chicago Cubs ==
For the 1968 season, the Cardinals optioned Lamabe to the Triple A Tulsa Oilers. He pitched a shutout in his only game for the Oilers when the Cardinals traded Lamabe and Ron Piche to the Chicago Cubs for Dave Dowling and Pete Mikkelsen. Lamabe was 3–2 with a 4.30 ERA for the Cubs. He began the 1969 season with the Pacific Coast League's Tacoma Cubs. On June 11, Lamabe and Adolfo Phillips were traded to the Montreal Expos for Paul Popovich.

== Coaching career ==
After finishing out the 1969 season as a minor leaguer with the Expos, Lamabe reported to Spring training 1970 as a non-roster invitee. While he failed to make the club, he was hired as a pitching coach in the team's minor-league system. Lamabe also served as head baseball coach of the Jacksonville University from 1974 to 1978, and in 1976 came within one game of the College World Series. He was inducted posthumously into the school's Hall of Fame in 2011.

Lamabe was head coach of the LSU Tigers baseball team from 1979 until 1983 and compiled an overall record of 134–115–0 (.538) and a record of 46–55–0 (.455) in the SEC. He was the first full-time head baseball coach in the history of the LSU baseball program and was replaced as head coach by Skip Bertman. Later, he was a pitching instructor for the Colorado Rockies and San Diego Padres before retiring.

== Career stats ==
| W | L | PCT | ERA | G | GS | CG | SHO | SV | IP | BF | H | ER | R | HR | BAA | K | BB | WP | HBP | Fld% | Avg. | SH |
| 33 | 41 | .446 | 4.24 | 285 | 49 | 7 | 3 | 16 | 711 | 3079 | 753 | 335 | 375 | 67 | .272 | 434 | 238 | 28 | 11 | .970 | .096 | 9 |

== Personal life ==
During his playing career, Lamabe attended Springfield College, where he earned a B.S. in Science and an MA in Administration. He met his wife Janet there, and the two married on July 11, 1966. They had two children, John and Jennifer. Lamabe is a member of the University of Vermont Athletic Hall of Fame and the Jacksonville University Athletic Hall of Fame. He was also an honorably discharged United States Marine Corps veteran. He died at his home in Baton Rouge, Louisiana, on December 21, 2007.
