= Dusty Decker =

American baseball player (1911–1962)

- Shortstop
- Born: October 19, 1911; Hopkinsville, Kentucky, U.S.
- Died: October 11, 1962 (aged 50); Evansville, Indiana, U.S.
- Batted: Unknown Threw: Unknown

Negro league baseball debut
- 1932, for the Indianapolis ABCs

Last appearance
- 1937, for the Detroit Stars
- Stats at Baseball Reference

Teams
- Indianapolis ABCs (1932); Montgomery Grey Sox (1932); Detroit Stars (1937)

Charles Edward "Dusty" Decker (October 19, 1911 – October 11, 1962) was an American professional baseball shortstop in the Negro leagues. He played with the Indianapolis ABCs and Montgomery Grey Sox in 1932 and the Detroit Stars.

== Early life and career ==
Charles Edward Decker was born on October 19, 1911, in Hopkinsville, Kentucky, the oldest of two sons born to Edward Decker and Inez Caldwell. Approximately one month later, the family moved to Evansville, Indiana.

Decker graduated from Frederick Douglass High School before briefly attending Fisk University in 1928. The following two years, he majored in physical education at Lincoln University while winning All-Midwestern honors as quarterback for the Blue Tigers, acquiring an alternate nickname, "the Human Catapult", in the process.
