= Steve Melter =

American baseball player (1886–1962)

- Pitcher
- Born: January 2, 1886; Marcus, Iowa, U.S.
- Died: January 28, 1962 (aged 76); Mishawaka, Indiana, U.S.
- Batted: Right Threw: Right

MLB debut
- June 27, 1909, for the St. Louis Cardinals

Last MLB appearance
- October 6, 1909, for the St. Louis Cardinals

MLB statistics
- Win–loss record: 0–1
- Earned run average: 3.50
- Strikeouts: 24
- Stats at Baseball Reference

Teams
- St. Louis Cardinals (1909)

Stephen Blasius Melter (January 2, 1886 – January 28, 1962) was an American pitcher in Major League Baseball who appeared in 23 games, all but one in relief, for the St. Louis Cardinals in 1909.

== Sources ==
- Career statistics from Baseball Reference · Retrosheet · Baseball Almanac
