= Ewing Waddy =

American baseball player

- Starting pitcher
- Born: October 3, 1910; Allisona, Tennessee, U.S.
- Died: July 1, 1962 (aged 51); Marion County, Tennessee, U.S.
- Batted: Left Threw: Left

Negro league baseball debut
- 1932, for the Indianapolis ABCs

Last appearance
- 1933, for the Indianapolis ABCs

Teams
- Indianapolis ABCs (1932–1933)

Ewing Thomas Waddy (October 3, 1910 – January 6, 1993) was an American professional baseball starting pitcher in the Negro leagues. He played with the Indianapolis ABCs from 1932 to 1933.
