= Juan Castillo (second baseman) =

Dominican baseball player (born 1962)

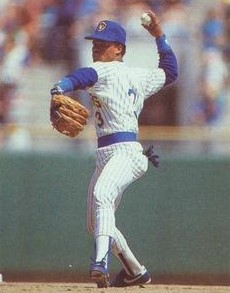
- Second baseman
- Born: January 25, 1962 (age 64); Santo Domingo, Dominican Republic
- Batted: Switch Threw: Right

MLB debut
- April 12, 1986, for the Milwaukee Brewers

Last MLB appearance
- April 17, 1989, for the Milwaukee Brewers

MLB statistics
- Batting average: .215
- Home runs: 3
- Runs batted in: 38

MLB statistics
- Batting average: .315
- Home runs: 22
- Runs batted in: 152
- Stats at Baseball Reference

Teams
- Milwaukee Brewers (1986–1989); Uni-President Lions (1991–1994); Chinatrust Whales (1997)

Career highlights and awards
- Taiwan Series champion (1991)

Juan Castillo Brayas (born January 25, 1962) is a Dominican former professional baseball player. He played all or part of four seasons in Major League Baseball from 1986 until 1989, all for the Milwaukee Brewers. His primary position was second base, but he also played a good deal at third base and shortstop.

Castillo was originally signed as an amateur free agent in 1979 by the Brewers. He played in their organization for his entire career until he became a free agent once again in 1989. After playing in the Cleveland Indians organization in 1990, he returned to the Brewers to start the 1991 season. He finished the year with the Rieleros de Aguascalientes of the Mexican League, and continued to play on and off in Mexico until 1998.

Castillo has one daughter and three sons and lives in Miami, Florida, with his wife and two youngest sons.
