= On-deck =

Situation of the next batter in baseball

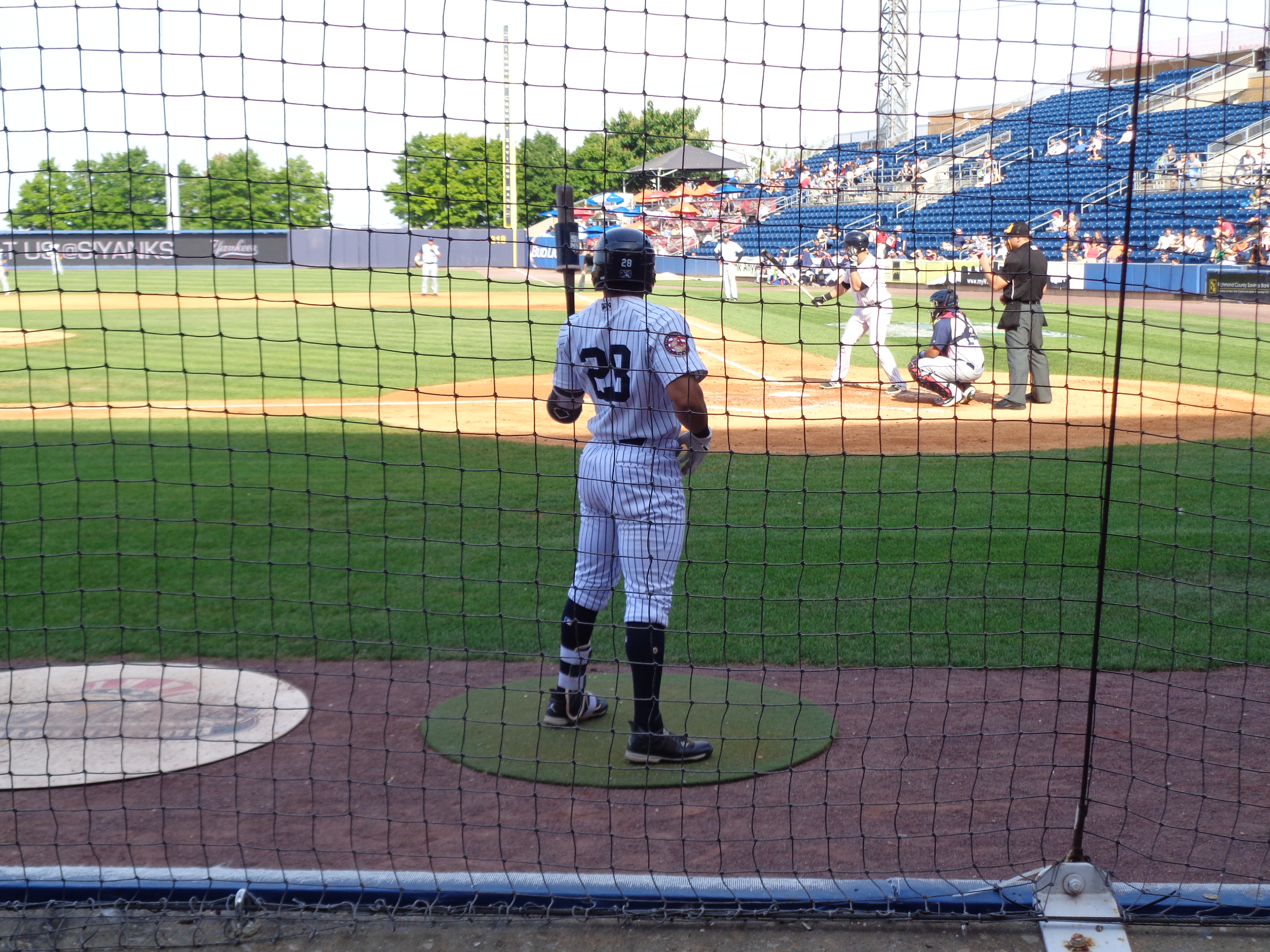
A player waits to bat in the on-deck circle.

In baseball, on-deck refers to being next in line to bat. In a professional game, the batter who is on deck traditionally waits in a location in the foul territory called the on-deck circle.

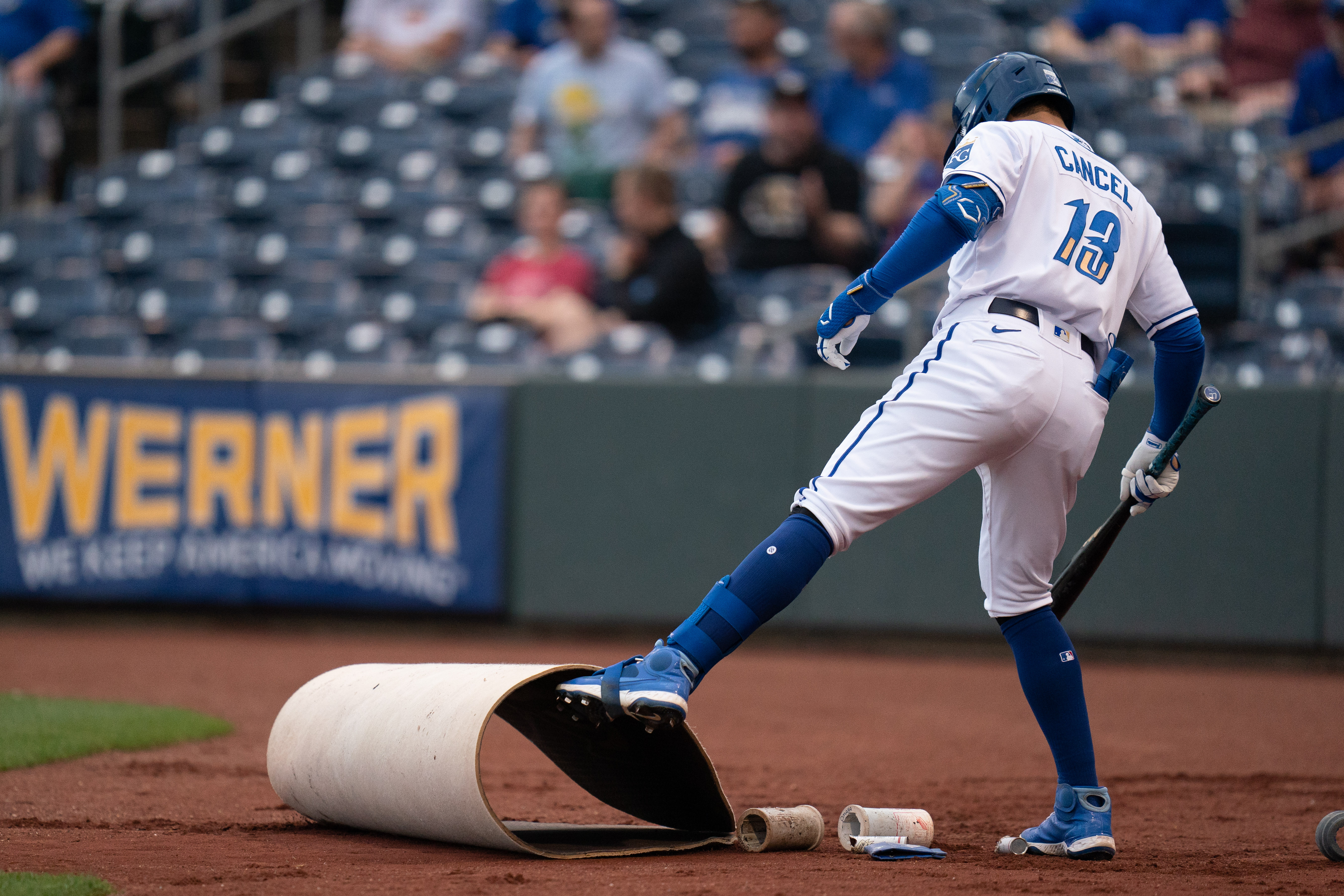
Gabriel Cancel of the Omaha Storm Chasers unfurls the on-deck circle during a game at Werner Park in 2022.

Being on-deck only guarantees the batter will get a chance to bat in the inning if there are fewer than two outs, and the number of outs plus the number of baserunners (including the one at bat) adds up to fewer than three, because a double play or triple play could occur. Additionally, the manager reserves the right to pull the on-deck hitter for a substitute at his discretion.

The player next in line to bat following the on-deck batter is colloquially referred to as being in-the-hole.

== On-deck circles ==
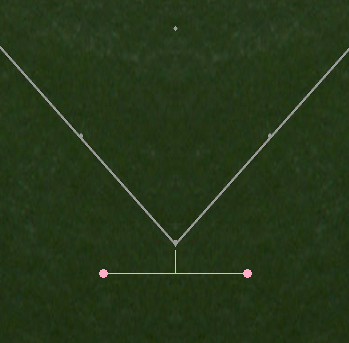
Diagram of on-deck circles (shown in pink)

There are two on-deck circles in the field, one for each team, positioned in foul ground between home plate and the respective teams' benches. The on-deck circle is where the next scheduled batter, or "on-deck" batter, warms up while waiting for the current batter to finish his turn. The on-deck circle is either an area composed of bare dirt; a plain circle painted onto artificial turf; or often, especially at the professional level, made from artificial material, with a team or league logo painted onto it.

According to Major League Baseball rules and NCAA baseball rules, there are two on-deck circles (one near each team's dugout). Each circle is 5 feet (1.5 m) in diameter, and the centers of the circles are 74 feet (23 m) apart. A straight line drawn between the centers of the two on-deck circles should pass 10 feet (3 m) behind home plate. In the Official Baseball Rules published by Major League Baseball, the on-deck circle is referred to as the "next batter's box".

== Significance in save situations ==
A relief pitcher who comes in to pitch when his team is ahead can earn a save if the tying run is either on base, at bat, or on-deck, and the pitcher then finishes the game without giving up the lead.
