= Tony Ferreira (baseball) =

American baseball player (born 1962)

- Pitcher
- Born: October 4, 1962 (age 63); Riverside, California, U.S.
- Batted: Left Threw: Left

MLB debut
- September 17, 1985, for the Kansas City Royals

Last MLB appearance
- October 6, 1985, for the Kansas City Royals

MLB statistics
- Win–loss record: 0–0
- Earned run average: 7.94
- Strikeouts: 5
- Stats at Baseball Reference

Teams
- Kansas City Royals (1985)

Anthony Ross Ferreira (born October 4, 1962) is an American former Major League Baseball pitcher who played for one month, a September call up with the 1985 Kansas City Royals, logging in 38 days in the major leagues. He pitched two games and ended the season with 7.94 ERA during the 1985 Kansas City Royals season. Ferreira resides in Tarpon Springs, Florida.
