= 1961 Philadelphia Phillies season =

Major League Baseball season

1961 Philadelphia Phillies
- League: National League
- Ballpark: Connie Mack Stadium
- City: Philadelphia
- Record: 47–107 (.305)
- League place: 8th
- Owners: R. R. M. Carpenter, Jr.
- General managers: John J. Quinn
- Managers: Gene Mauch
- Television: WFIL
- Radio: WFIL (By Saam, Claude Haring, Frank Sims)

The 1961 Philadelphia Phillies season was the 79th in franchise history. The Phillies finished the season in last place in the National League at 47–107, 46 games behind the NL Champion Cincinnati Reds. The team also lost 23 games in a row, the most in the majors since 1900.

== Offseason ==
- November 28, 1960: Choo-Choo Coleman was drafted by the Phillies from the Los Angeles Dodgers in the 1960 rule 5 draft.

== Regular season ==
=== Season standings ===
National League
Team	W	L	Pct.	GB	Home	Road
Cincinnati Reds	93	61	.604	—	47‍–‍30	46‍–‍31
Los Angeles Dodgers	89	65	.578	4	45‍–‍32	44‍–‍33
San Francisco Giants	85	69	.552	8	45‍–‍32	40‍–‍37
Milwaukee Braves	83	71	.539	10	45‍–‍32	38‍–‍39
St. Louis Cardinals	80	74	.519	13	48‍–‍29	32‍–‍45
Pittsburgh Pirates	75	79	.487	18	38‍–‍39	37‍–‍40
Chicago Cubs	64	90	.416	29	40‍–‍37	24‍–‍53
Philadelphia Phillies	47	107	.305	46	22‍–‍55	25‍–‍52

=== Record vs. opponents ===
1961 National League record Sources:
Team	CHC	CIN	LAD	MIL	PHI	PIT	SF	STL
Chicago	—	12–10	7–15	9–13–1	13–9	11–11	5–17	7–15–1
Cincinnati	10–12	—	12–10	15–7	19–3	11–11	12–10	14–8
Los Angeles	15–7	10–12	—	12–10	17–5	13–9	10–12	12–10
Milwaukee	13–9–1	7–15	10–12	—	16–6	12–10	11–11	14–8
Philadelphia	9–13	3–19	5–17	6–16	—	7–15	8–14–1	9–13
Pittsburgh	11–11	11–11	9–13	10–12	15–7	—	10–12	9–13
San Francisco	17–5	10–12	12–10	11–11	14–8–1	12–10	—	9–13
St. Louis	15–7–1	8–14	10–12	8–14	13–9	13–9	13–9	—

=== Notable transactions ===
- May 4, 1961: Turk Farrell and Joe Koppe were traded by the Phillies to the Los Angeles Dodgers for Charley Smith and Don Demeter.
- June 1, 1961: Warren Hacker was purchased from the Phillies by the Chicago White Sox.
- July 2, 1961: Bobby Del Greco was traded by the Phillies to the Kansas City Athletics for Wes Covington.

=== 1961 Game log ===
Legend
	Phillies win
	Phillies loss
	Phillies tie
	Postponement
**Bold**	Phillies team member

1961 Game Log
Overall Record: 47–107
April (6–9)

#	Date	Opponent	Score	Win	Loss	Save	Attendance	Record
1	April 11	@ Dodgers	2–6	Don Drysdale (1–0)	**Robin Roberts** (0–1)	Larry Sherry (1)	50,927	0–1
2	April 12	@ Dodgers	2–3	Johnny Podres (1–0)	**Frank Sullivan** (0–1)	Larry Sherry (2)	10,694	0–2
3	April 13	@ Dodgers	8–7	**Turk Farrell** (1–0)	Ed Palmquist (0–1)	None	10,312	1–2
4	April 14	@ Giants	0–2	Mike McCormick (1–1)	**Art Mahaffey** (0–1)	None	19,989	1–3
5	April 15	@ Giants	2–0	**Dallas Green** (1–0)	Juan Marichal (0–1)	None	18,755	2–3
6	April 16	@ Giants	2–5	Sam Jones (1–0)	**Robin Roberts** (0–2)	Billy O'Dell (1)	23,594	2–4
–	April 18	Braves	Postponed (rain); Makeup: July 19 as a traditional double-header					
–	April 19	Braves	Postponed (rain and cold weather); Makeup: August 25 as a traditional double-header					
7	April 20	Braves	6–7 (11)	Ron Piché (1–0)	**John Buzhardt** (0–1)	None	9,531	2–5
8	April 21	Cubs	2–3	Don Cardwell (1–0)	**Robin Roberts** (0–3)	Don Elston (1)	5,738	2–6
9	April 22	Cubs	4–6 (11)	Don Elston (3–0)	**Turk Farrell** (1–1)	None	3,996	2–7
10	April 23 (1)	Cubs	1–0	**Frank Sullivan** (1–1)	Dick Ellsworth (0–1)	None	see 2nd game	3–7
11	April 23 (2)	Cubs	6–0	**Art Mahaffey** (1–1)	Bob Anderson (0–2)	None	16,027	4–7
–	April 25	@ Pirates	Postponed (rain and wet grounds); Makeup: June 25 as a traditional double-header					
12	April 26	@ Pirates	2–3	Vinegar Bend Mizell (2–0)	**Dallas Green** (1–1)	None	9,420	4–8
13	April 28	@ Cardinals	9–10 (11)	Al Cicotte (1–2)	**Dallas Green** (1–2)	None	5,620	4–9
14	April 29	@ Cardinals	3–2	**Art Mahaffey** (2–1)	Ray Sadecki (1–1)	None	6,175	5–9
15	April 30	@ Cardinals	11–7 (10)	**Turk Farrell** (2–1)	Larry Jackson (0–2)	None	8,194	6–9

May (6–18)

#	Date	Opponent	Score	Win	Loss	Save	Attendance	Record
16	May 1	@ Reds	2–3	Jim O'Toole (2–2)	**Robin Roberts** (0–4)	None	2,089	6–10
17	May 2	@ Reds	2–3	Ken Hunt (2–1)	**Dallas Green** (1–3)	Jim Brosnan (3)	3,026	6–11
18	May 3	@ Reds	3–9	Jim Maloney (1–1)	**John Buzhardt** (0–2)	Bill Henry (1)	4,018	6–12
19	May 4	@ Reds	0–4	Joey Jay (1–3)	**Art Mahaffey** (2–2)	None	3,087	6–13
20	May 5	Giants	2–4	Juan Marichal (2–1)	**Frank Sullivan** (1–2)	None	15,674	6–14
–	May 6	Giants	Postponed (rain); Makeup: July 28 as a traditional double-header					
21	May 7	Giants	0–7	Billy Loes (3–1)	**Robin Roberts** (0–5)	None	9,985	6–15
22	May 8	Dodgers	3–4 (10)	Turk Farrell (3–1)	**Chris Short** (0–1)	None	8,529	6–16
23	May 9	Dodgers	2–5 (6)	Don Drysdale (3–2)	**Art Mahaffey** (2–3)	None	11,483	6–17
24	May 10	Dodgers	0–6	Johnny Podres (5–0)	**Frank Sullivan** (1–3)	None	8,170	6–18
25	May 12	Cardinals	1–5	Ernie Broglio (3–3)	**John Buzhardt** (0–3)	None	5,463	6–19
26	May 13	Cardinals	3–1	**Art Mahaffey** (3–3)	Ray Sadecki (2–2)	None	5,827	7–19
27	May 14	Cardinals	6–4	**Chris Short** (1–1)	Lindy McDaniel (2–2)	None	4,276	8–19
28	May 16	Reds	2–4	Joey Jay (3–3)	**Frank Sullivan** (1–4)	None	5,428	8–20
29	May 17	Reds	1–2	Bob Purkey (4–1)	**John Buzhardt** (0–4)	None	4,641	8–21
30	May 19	Pirates	4–1	**Art Mahaffey** (4–3)	Bob Friend (4–4)	None	16,035	9–21
31	May 20	Pirates	3–4	Joe Gibbon (3–2)	**Robin Roberts** (0–6)	Roy Face (6)	12,547	9–22
32	May 21	Pirates	11–13	Bob Friend (5–4)	**Don Ferrarese** (0–1)	None	9,291	9–23
33	May 23	@ Cubs	2–1 (10)	**Frank Sullivan** (2–4)	Glen Hobbie (2–5)	**Chris Short** (1)	2,179	10–23
34	May 24	@ Braves	7–1	**Art Mahaffey** (5–3)	Don Nottebart (2–3)	None	9,120	11–23
–	May 25	@ Braves	Postponed (rain); Makeup: July 5 as a traditional double-header					
–	May 26	@ Reds	Postponed (cold); Makeup: August 2 as a traditional double-header					
35	May 27	@ Reds	4–5	Joey Jay (5–3)	**John Buzhardt** (0–5)	Jim Brosnan (5)	7,690	11–24
36	May 28	@ Reds	2–4	Bob Purkey (5–2)	**Frank Sullivan** (2–5)	None	6,632	11–25
37	May 30 (1)	Braves	1–3	Bob Buhl (2–4)	**Don Ferrarese** (0–2)	None	see 2nd game	11–26
38	May 30 (2)	Braves	11–4	**Art Mahaffey** (6–3)	Carl Willey (2–1)	None	28,783	12–26
39	May 31	Cubs	4–5	Bob Anderson (2–3)	**Robin Roberts** (0–7)	Don Elston (5)	4,213	12–27

June (10–18–1)

#	Date	Opponent	Score	Win	Loss	Save	Attendance	Record
40	June 1	Cubs	3–10	Glen Hobbie (3–5)	**Frank Sullivan** (2–6)	None	3,785	12–28
41	June 2	@ Pirates	6–0	**John Buzhardt** (1–5)	Bob Friend (5–7)	None	14,344	13–28
42	June 3	@ Pirates	1–5	Bobby Shantz (2–1)	**Art Mahaffey** (6–4)	Roy Face (7)	11,153	13–29
43	June 4	@ Pirates	5–0	**Don Ferrarese** (1–2)	Vinegar Bend Mizell (4–3)	None	27,352	14–29
44	June 5	@ Giants	3–2	**Robin Roberts** (1–7)	Mike McCormick (5–5)	None	4,881	15–29
45	June 6	@ Giants	13–9	**Dallas Green** (2–3)	Billy O'Dell (1–3)	**Ken Lehman** (1)	10,533	16–29
46	June 7	@ Giants	3–4 (11)	Stu Miller (5–0)	**Chris Short** (1–2)	None	6,048	16–30
47	June 8	@ Giants	5–2	**John Buzhardt** (2–5)	Sam Jones (5–5)	None	5,703	17–30
48	June 9	@ Dodgers	1–3	Don Drysdale (4–3)	**Frank Sullivan** (2–7)	None	19,110	17–31
49	June 10	@ Dodgers	4–5	Larry Sherry (2–2)	**John Buzhardt** (2–6)	None	18,908	17–32
50	June 11	@ Dodgers	3–6	Sandy Koufax (9–2)	**Art Mahaffey** (6–5)	None	18,833	17–33
51	June 13	Cardinals	3–2	**Frank Sullivan** (3–7)	Larry Jackson (2–6)	None	7,327	18–33
–	June 14	Cardinals	Postponed (rain); Makeup: August 29 as a traditional double-header					
52	June 15	Cardinals	3–6	Ray Sadecki (5–4)	**Art Mahaffey** (6–6)	Bob Miller (2)	6,789	18–34
53	June 16	Reds	1–4	Ken Hunt (7–3)	**John Buzhardt** (2–7)	Jim Brosnan (10)	10,508	18–35
54	June 17	Reds	5–10	Bob Purkey (8–3)	**Robin Roberts** (1–8)	None	5,205	18–36
55	June 18 (1)	Reds	2–7	Howie Nunn (2–0)	**Don Ferrarese** (1–3)	None	see 2nd game	18–37
56	June 18 (2)	Reds	0–10	Jim O'Toole (6–6)	**Chris Short** (1–3)	None	16,369	18–38
57	June 20	Pirates	2–6	Harvey Haddix (5–2)	**Art Mahaffey** (6–7)	Roy Face (10)	10,649	18–39
–	June 21	Pirates	Postponed (rain); Makeup: August 8 as a traditional double-header					
58	June 22	Pirates	1–5	Bob Friend (8–7)	**John Buzhardt** (2–8)	None	9,126	18–40
59	June 23	@ Pirates	12–11	**Ken Lehman** (1–0)	Earl Francis (0–2)	**Frank Sullivan** (1)	16,170	19–40
60	June 24	@ Pirates	6–2	**Chris Short** (2–3)	Vinegar Bend Mizell (4–6)	**Frank Sullivan** (2)	9,546	20–40
61	June 25 (1)	@ Pirates	5–10	Roy Face (3–3)	**Jack Baldschun** (0–1)	None	see 2nd game	20–41
62	June 25 (2)	@ Pirates	4–3	**Art Mahaffey** (7–7)	Harvey Haddix (5–3)	**Frank Sullivan** (3)	10,951	21–41
63	June 26	Giants	1–0	**Jim Owens** (1–0)	Jack Sanford (3–5)	**Dallas Green** (1)	7,872	22–41
64	June 27	Giants	5–12	Juan Marichal (5–4)	**John Buzhardt** (2–9)	Stu Miller (7)	10,728	22–42
65	June 28	Giants	7–7 (15)	None	None	None	11,597	22–42–1
66	June 29 (1)	Giants	7–8 (10)	Juan Marichal (6–4)	**Frank Sullivan** (3–8)	None	see 2nd game	22–43–1
67	June 29 (2)	Giants	1–4	Billy Loes (5–5)	**Art Mahaffey** (7–8)	None	14,997	22–44–1
68	June 30	Dodgers	6–10	Stan Williams (7–7)	**Jim Owens** (1–1)	Turk Farrell (3)	17,518	22–45–1

July (8–21)

#	Date	Opponent	Score	Win	Loss	Save	Attendance	Record
69	July 1	Dodgers	2–5	Johnny Podres (8–1)	**John Buzhardt** (2–10)	Larry Sherry (11)	19,064	22–46–1
70	July 2	Dodgers	1–2	Don Drysdale (6–5)	**Art Mahaffey** (7–9)	Turk Farrell (4)	15,039	22–47–1
71	July 4 (1)	@ Cardinals	7–10	Curt Simmons (3–7)	**Don Ferrarese** (1–4)	Mickey McDermott (4)	see 2nd game	22–48–1
72	July 4 (2)	@ Cardinals	10–6	**Jack Baldschun** (1–1)	Craig Anderson (1–1)	**Frank Sullivan** (4)	14,653	23–48–1
73	July 5 (1)	@ Braves	4–5 (12)	Don McMahon (4–0)	**Frank Sullivan** (3–9)	None	see 2nd game	23–49–1
74	July 5 (2)	@ Braves	0–4	Lew Burdette (9–5)	**Ken Lehman** (1–1)	None	14,280	23–50–1
75	July 6	@ Braves	6–7	Johnny Antonelli (1–4)	**Don Ferrarese** (1–5)	Don McMahon (5)	10,439	23–51–1
76	July 7	@ Cubs	3–9	Don Cardwell (8–6)	**Chris Short** (2–4)	None	5,356	23–52–1
77	July 8	@ Cubs	4–6	Jack Curtis (6–2)	**Jim Owens** (1–2)	Barney Schultz (5)	11,645	23–53–1
78	July 9 (1)	@ Cubs	8–9	Glen Hobbie (7–9)	**Art Mahaffey** (7–10)	Bob Anderson (3)	see 2nd game	23–54–1
79	July 9 (2)	@ Cubs	5–8 (8)	Dick Ellsworth (4–6)	**Chris Short** (2–5)	None	20,556	23–55–1
–	July 11	**1961 Major League Baseball All-Star Game at Candlestick Park in San Francisco**						
80	July 13	@ Dodgers	2–7	Stan Williams (9–8)	**Art Mahaffey** (7–11)	None	14,238	23–56–1
81	July 14	@ Dodgers	7–5 (10)	**Jack Baldschun** (2–1)	Roger Craig (3–6)	None	13,871	24–56–1
82	July 15	@ Dodgers	7–2	**Chris Short** (3–5)	Sandy Koufax (11–6)	None	8,062	25–56–1
83	July 16	@ Giants	3–7	Sam Jones (7–5)	**Jim Owens** (1–3)	Stu Miller (8)	17,608	25–57–1
84	July 17	@ Giants	10–7	**Jack Baldschun** (3–1)	Bobby Bolin (2–1)	None	10,401	26–57–1
85	July 19 (1)	Braves	5–8	Bob Buhl (6–8)	**Art Mahaffey** (7–12)	Don McMahon (6)	see 2nd game	26–58–1
86	July 19 (2)	Braves	2–1	**Don Ferrarese** (2–5)	Carl Willey (3–4)	None	19,818	27–58–1
87	July 20	Braves	1–5	Bob Hendley (3–2)	**Chris Short** (3–6)	None	6,614	27–59–1
88	July 21	Cubs	4–3 (10)	**Jack Baldschun** (4–1)	Barney Schultz (3–2)	None	5,413	28–59–1
89	July 22	Cubs	6–5	**Chris Short** (4–6)	Glen Hobbie (7–11)	**Jack Baldschun** (1)	2,956	29–59–1
90	July 23	Cubs	5–11	Don Elston (6–5)	**Art Mahaffey** (7–13)	None	3,476	29–60–1
91	July 25	Dodgers	2–7	Sandy Koufax (13–6)	**Don Ferrarese** (2–6)	None	10,391	29–61–1
92	July 26	Dodgers	1–6	Don Drysdale (8–6)	**Jim Owens** (1–4)	None	10,058	29–62–1
93	July 27	Dodgers	6–11	Roger Craig (4–6)	**Jack Baldschun** (4–2)	Larry Sherry (14)	8,415	29–63–1
94	July 28 (1)	Giants	5–8	Dom Zanni (1–0)	**Art Mahaffey** (7–14)	Stu Miller (9)	see 2nd game	29–64–1
95	July 28 (2)	Giants	4–3	**John Buzhardt** (3–10)	Dick LeMay (2–4)	None	19,558	30–64–1
96	July 29	Giants	3–4	Mike McCormick (9–9)	**Don Ferrarese** (2–7)	None	8,667	30–65–1
97	July 30	Giants	2–5	Jack Sanford (6–5)	**Jim Owens** (1–5)	None	8,347	30–66–1
–	July 31	**1961 Major League Baseball All-Star Game at Fenway Park in Boston**						

August (7–26)

#	Date	Opponent	Score	Win	Loss	Save	Attendance	Record
98	August 2 (1)	@ Reds	2–4	Jim O'Toole (11–8)	**Art Mahaffey** (7–15)	Bill Henry (13)	see 2nd game	30–67–1
99	August 2 (2)	@ Reds	2–3	Joey Jay (15–6)	**Chris Short** (4–7)	Sherman Jones (2)	19,286	30–68–1
100	August 3	@ Reds	1–7	Ken Johnson (2–4)	**John Buzhardt** (3–11)	None	9,625	30–69–1
101	August 4	@ Cardinals	8–9	Ernie Broglio (8–10)	**Don Ferrarese** (2–8)	Ed Bauta (2)	8,749	30–70–1
102	August 5	@ Cardinals	0–7	Curt Simmons (6–7)	**Paul Brown** (0–1)	None	7,140	30–71–1
103	August 6 (1)	@ Cardinals	1–3	Ray Sadecki (9–5)	**Frank Sullivan** (3–10)	None	see 2nd game	30–72–1
104	August 6 (2)	@ Cardinals	2–3	Bob Gibson (8–8)	**Jim Owens** (1–6)	None	18,784	30–73–1
105	August 7	Pirates	1–3	Bob Friend (11–13)	**John Buzhardt** (3–12)	None	5,586	30–74–1
106	August 8 (1)	Pirates	2–10	Harvey Haddix (8–5)	**Art Mahaffey** (7–16)	None	see 2nd game	30–75–1
107	August 8 (2)	Pirates	2–3	Tom Sturdivant (3–6)	**Chris Short** (4–8)	None	11,081	30–76–1
108	August 9	Reds	0–5	Joey Jay (16–7)	**Don Ferrarese** (2–9)	None	9,317	30–77–1
109	August 11	@ Pirates	0–6 (7)	Bob Friend (12–13)	**Robin Roberts** (1–9)	None	12,965	30–78–1
110	August 12	@ Pirates	0–4	Vinegar Bend Mizell (6–8)	**Jim Owens** (1–7)	None	8,785	30–79–1
111	August 13	@ Pirates	4–13	Tom Sturdivant (4–6)	**John Buzhardt** (3–13)	None	12,923	30–80–1
112	August 14	@ Cubs	2–9	Dick Ellsworth (6–7)	**Frank Sullivan** (3–11)	None	5,608	30–81–1
113	August 15	@ Cubs	5–6	Jack Curtis (8–7)	**Art Mahaffey** (7–17)	Bob Anderson (5)	5,878	30–82–1
114	August 16	@ Cubs	5–9	Don Cardwell (10–10)	**Chris Short** (4–9)	None	6,390	30–83–1
115	August 17	@ Braves	6–7 (11)	Don Nottebart (4–6)	**Jack Baldschun** (4–3)	None	12,451	30–84–1
116	August 18	@ Braves	1–4	Lew Burdette (15–8)	**Jim Owens** (1–8)	None	15,791	30–85–1
117	August 19	@ Braves	3–4	Tony Cloninger (4–2)	**Frank Sullivan** (3–12)	Don McMahon (7)	10,574	30–86–1
118	August 20 (1)	@ Braves	2–5	Warren Spahn (14–12)	**Chris Short** (4–10)	None	see 2nd game	30–87–1
119	August 20 (2)	@ Braves	7–4	**John Buzhardt** (4–13)	Carl Willey (5–7)	None	24,637	31–87–1
120	August 22	Cubs	6–0	**Art Mahaffey** (8–17)	Dick Ellsworth (7–8)	None	4,957	32–87–1
–	August 23	Cubs	Postponed (wet grounds); Makeup: August 24					
121	August 24	Cubs	7–4	**Jim Owens** (2–8)	Jack Curtis (8–9)	**Don Ferrarese** (1)	2,773	33–87–1
122	August 25 (1)	Braves	9–4	**John Buzhardt** (5–13)	Carl Willey (5–8)	None	see 2nd game	34–87–1
123	August 25 (2)	Braves	4–9	Tony Cloninger (5–2)	**Frank Sullivan** (3–13)	None	13,037	34–88–1
–	August 26	Braves	Postponed (rain); Makeup: August 27 as a traditional double-header					
124	August 27 (1)	Braves	10–11 (12)	Bob Hendley (4–3)	**Jim Owens** (2–9)	None	see 2nd game	34–89–1
125	August 27 (2)	Braves	3–0	**Art Mahaffey** (9–17)	Bob Buhl (9–10)	None	9,263	35–89–1
126	August 28	Braves	1–7	Warren Spahn (16–12)	**Robin Roberts** (1–10)	None	6,346	35–90–1
127	August 29 (1)	Cardinals	4–5	Curt Simmons (8–9)	**John Buzhardt** (5–14)	Ed Bauta (5)	see 2nd game	35–91–1
128	August 29 (2)	Cardinals	4–3	**Chris Short** (5–10)	Al Cicotte (2–5)	None	8,592	36–91–1
129	August 30	Cardinals	4–3	**Don Ferrarese** (3–9)	Ray Sadecki (12–7)	None	4,952	37–91–1
130	August 31	Cardinals	1–2	Bob Gibson (10–10)	**Art Mahaffey** (9–18)	None	4,803	37–92–1

September (10–14)

#	Date	Opponent	Score	Win	Loss	Save	Attendance	Record
131	September 2	Reds	4–7	Joey Jay (19–8)	**John Buzhardt** (5–15)	Bill Henry (16)	4,147	37–93–1
132	September 3	Reds	3–2	**Jim Owens** (3–9)	Jim Maloney (6–6)	None	4,752	38–93–1
133	September 4 (1)	Reds	0–5	Ken Johnson (6–6)	**Frank Sullivan** (3–14)	None	see 2nd game	38–94–1
134	September 4 (2)	Reds	5–3	**Art Mahaffey** (10–18)	Ken Hunt (9–10)	None	16,175	39–94–1
135	September 5	@ Braves	4–5 (14)	Lew Burdette (16–9)	**Frank Sullivan** (3–15)	None	8,018	39–95–1
136	September 6	@ Braves	0–1	Warren Spahn (18–12)	**John Buzhardt** (5–16)	None	10,090	39–96–1
137	September 8	@ Cubs	1–4	Dick Ellsworth (8–10)	**Art Mahaffey** (10–19)	None	1,533	39–97–1
138	September 9	@ Cubs	6–2	**Jim Owens** (4–9)	Jack Curtis (10–11)	None	7,110	40–97–1
139	September 10	@ Cubs	14–6	**Don Ferrarese** (4–9)	Barney Schultz (7–4)	**Frank Sullivan** (5)	7,628	41–97–1
140	September 11	@ Dodgers	5–6 (11)	Ron Perranoski (7–5)	**Don Ferrarese** (4–10)	None	9,064	41–98–1
141	September 12	@ Dodgers	19–10	**Chris Short** (6–10)	Sandy Koufax (15–11)	**Jack Baldschun** (2)	8,629	42–98–1
142	September 13	@ Giants	2–8	Jim Duffalo (4–0)	**Dallas Green** (2–4)	None	5,585	42–99–1
143	September 14	@ Giants	4–3 (10)	**John Buzhardt** (6–16)	Dick LeMay (3–6)	None	4,328	43–99–1
144	September 16	@ Reds	2–3	Jim O'Toole (16–9)	**Jim Owens** (4–10)	Jim Brosnan (15)	8,376	43–100–1
145	September 17	@ Reds	4–0	**Art Mahaffey** (11–19)	Bob Purkey (16–11)	**Frank Sullivan** (6)	14,671	44–100–1
146	September 19	@ Cardinals	0–3	Curt Simmons (9–10)	**John Buzhardt** (6–17)	None	4,935	44–101–1
147	September 20	@ Cardinals	6–1	**Don Ferrarese** (5–10)	Ernie Broglio (9–12)	None	5,113	45–101–1
148	September 22	Pirates	2–3	Clem Labine (4–1)	**Frank Sullivan** (3–16)	None	4,687	45–102–1
149	September 23	Pirates	5–4 (16)	**Jack Baldschun** (5–3)	Roy Face (6–12)	None	4,005	46–102–1
150	September 24	Pirates	3–4	Vinegar Bend Mizell (7–10)	**Chris Short** (6–11)	Tom Sturdivant (1)	3,282	46–103–1
151	September 25	Giants	2–10	Mike McCormick (13–16)	**Don Ferrarese** (5–11)	None	3,416	46–104–1
152	September 27	Dodgers	2–1	**Jim Owens** (5–10)	Sandy Koufax (18–13)	**Jack Baldschun** (3)	4,166	47–104–1
153	September 28	Dodgers	0–10	Don Drysdale (13–10)	**Chris Short** (6–12)	None	3,651	47–105–1
154	September 30	Cardinals	2–12	Ray Washburn (1–1)	**John Buzhardt** (6–18)	None	2,587	47–106–1

October (0–1)

#	Date	Opponent	Score	Win	Loss	Save	Attendance	Record
155	October 1	Cardinals	0–2	Bob Gibson (13–12)	**Don Ferrarese** (5–12)	None	2,496	47–107–1

=== Roster ===
1961 Philadelphia Phillies
**Roster**
**Pitchers**: 27 Jack Baldschun; 34 Paul Brown; 23 John Buzhardt; 43 Turk Farrell; 14 Don Ferrarese; 46 Dallas Green; 25 Ken Lehman; 28 Art Mahaffey; 42 Jack Meyer; 49 Jim Owens; 36 Robin Roberts; 41 Chris Short; 29 Frank Sullivan	**Catchers**: 10 Jimmie Coker; 12 Choo-Choo Coleman; 11 Clay Dalrymple; 10 Darrell Johnson; 10 Al Kenders; 10 Cal Neeman; **Infielders**: 20 Rubén Amaro; 7,18 Pancho Herrera; 15 Joe Koppe; 19 Bobby Malkmus; 5 Bob Sadowski; 15 Charley Smith; 8 Tony Taylor; 9 Lee Walls; 5 George Williams; 30 Jim Woods	**Outfielders**: 6 Johnny Callison; 26,43 Wes Covington; 7 Tony Curry; 26 Bobby Del Greco; 24 Don Demeter; 22 Tony González; 16 Bobby Gene Smith; 18 Elmer Valo; 17 Ken Walters	**Manager**: 4 Gene Mauch; **Coaches**: 2 Bob Lemon; 3 Peanuts Lowrey; 1 Al Vincent

== Player stats ==
=== Batting ===
==== Starters by position ====
Note: Pos = Position; G = Games played; AB = At bats; H = Hits; Avg. = Batting average; HR = Home runs; RBI = Runs batted in

Pos	Player	G	AB	H	Avg.	HR	RBI
C	Clay Dalrymple	129	378	83	.220	5	42
1B	Pancho Herrera	126	400	103	.258	13	51
2B	Tony Taylor	106	400	100	.250	2	26
3B	Charley Smith	112	411	102	.248	9	47
SS	Rubén Amaro	135	381	98	.257	1	32
LF	Johnny Callison	138	455	121	.266	9	47
CF	Tony González	126	426	118	.277	12	58
RF	Ken Walters	86	180	41	.228	2	14

==== Other batters ====
Note: G = Games played; AB = At bats; H = Hits; Avg. = Batting average; HR = Home runs; RBI = Runs batted in

Player	G	AB	H	Avg.	HR	RBI
Don Demeter	106	382	98	.257	20	68
Bobby Malkmus	121	342	79	.231	7	31
Lee Walls	91	261	73	.280	8	30
Bobby Smith	79	174	44	.253	2	18
Wes Covington	57	165	50	.303	7	26
Bobby Del Greco	41	112	29	.259	2	11
Darrell Johnson	21	61	14	.230	0	3
Bob Sadowski	16	54	7	.130	0	0
Jim Woods	23	48	11	.229	2	9
Choo Choo Coleman	34	47	6	.128	0	4
Elmer Valo	50	43	8	.186	1	8
George Williams	17	36	9	.250	0	1
Tony Curry	15	36	7	.194	0	3
Cal Neeman	19	31	7	.226	0	2
Jimmie Coker	11	25	10	.400	1	4
Al Kenders	10	23	4	.174	0	1
Joe Koppe	6	3	0	.000	0	0

=== Pitching ===
==== Starting pitchers ====
Note: G = Games pitched; IP = Innings pitched; W = Wins; L = Losses; ERA = Earned run average; SO = Strikeouts

Player	G	IP	W	L	ERA	SO
Art Mahaffey	36	219.1	11	19	4.10	158
John Buzhardt	41	202.1	6	18	4.49	92
Robin Roberts	26	117.0	1	10	5.85	54
Jim Owens	20	106.2	5	10	4.47	38

==== Other pitchers ====
Note: G = Games pitched; IP = Innings pitched; W = Wins; L = Losses; ERA = Earned run average; SO = Strikeouts

Player	G	IP	W	L	ERA	SO
Frank Sullivan	49	159.1	3	16	4.29	114
Don Ferrarese	42	138.2	5	12	3.76	89
Dallas Green	42	128.0	2	4	4.85	51
Chris Short	39	127.1	6	12	5.94	80
Paul Brown	5	10.0	0	1	8.10	1

==== Relief pitchers ====
Note: G = Games pitched; W = Wins; L = Losses; SV = Saves; ERA = Earned run average; SO = Strikeouts

Player	G	W	L	SV	ERA	SO
Jack Baldschun	65	5	3	3	3.88	59
Ken Lehman	41	1	1	1	4.26	27
Turk Farrell	5	2	1	0	6.52	10
Jack Meyer	1	0	0	0	9.00	2

== Minor league system ==
Level	Team	League	Manager
AAA	Buffalo Bisons	International League	Kerby Farrell
AA	Chattanooga Lookouts	Southern Association	Frank Lucchesi
A	Williamsport Grays	Eastern League	Andy Seminick
B	Des Moines Demons	Illinois–Indiana–Iowa League	Chuck Kress
C	Bakersfield Bears	California League	Lou Kahn
C	Magic Valley Cowboys	Pioneer League	Jack Phillips
D	Dothan Phillies	Alabama–Florida League	Bob Wellman
D	Elmira Pioneers	New York–Penn League	Moose Johnson

LEAGUE CHAMPIONS: Buffalo, Chattanooga
