= 1961 Los Angeles Dodgers season =

1961 Los Angeles Dodgers
- League: National League
- Ballpark: Los Angeles Memorial Coliseum
- City: Los Angeles
- Record: 89–65 (.578)
- Divisional place: 2nd
- Owners: Walter O'Malley, James & Dearie Mulvey
- President: Walter O'Malley
- General managers: Buzzie Bavasi
- Managers: Walter Alston
- Television: KTTV (11)
- Radio: KFI; Vin Scully, Jerry Doggett; KWKW; René Cárdenas, Jaime Jarrín, Miguel Alonzo

The 1961 Los Angeles Dodgers season was the 72nd season for the Los Angeles Dodgers franchise in Major League Baseball (MLB), their 4th season in Los Angeles, California, and their 4th and final season playing their home games at Los Angeles Memorial Coliseum in Los Angeles California, since they moved to their new stadium the following season. The Dodgers finished in second place in the National League with a record of 89–65, four games behind the Cincinnati Reds.

== Offseason ==
- November 28, 1960: Ray Semproch was drafted by the Washington Senators from the Dodgers in the 1960 rule 5 draft.
- December 15, 1960: Earl Robinson was purchased from the Dodgers by the Baltimore Orioles.
- December 16, 1960: Danny McDevitt was purchased from the Dodgers by the New York Yankees.
- January 31, 1961: Joe Pignatano was purchased from the Dodgers by the Kansas City Athletics.
- March 30, 1961: Ed Rakow was traded by the Dodgers to the Kansas City Athletics for Howie Reed and cash.

== Regular season ==
On April 17, 1961, Duke Snider hit his 370th career home run, which at the time moved him into 7th place on the all-time career home runs list. Later in the same game, Snider suffered a broken elbow, and he was knocked out for a good part of the season when he was hit by a pitch from Bob Gibson of the Cardinals.

=== Season standings ===
National League
Team	W	L	Pct.	GB	Home	Road
Cincinnati Reds	93	61	.604	—	47‍–‍30	46‍–‍31
Los Angeles Dodgers	89	65	.578	4	45‍–‍32	44‍–‍33
San Francisco Giants	85	69	.552	8	45‍–‍32	40‍–‍37
Milwaukee Braves	83	71	.539	10	45‍–‍32	38‍–‍39
St. Louis Cardinals	80	74	.519	13	48‍–‍29	32‍–‍45
Pittsburgh Pirates	75	79	.487	18	38‍–‍39	37‍–‍40
Chicago Cubs	64	90	.416	29	40‍–‍37	24‍–‍53
Philadelphia Phillies	47	107	.305	46	22‍–‍55	25‍–‍52

=== Record vs. opponents ===
1961 National League record Sources:
Team	CHC	CIN	LAD	MIL	PHI	PIT	SF	STL
Chicago	—	12–10	7–15	9–13–1	13–9	11–11	5–17	7–15–1
Cincinnati	10–12	—	12–10	15–7	19–3	11–11	12–10	14–8
Los Angeles	15–7	10–12	—	12–10	17–5	13–9	10–12	12–10
Milwaukee	13–9–1	7–15	10–12	—	16–6	12–10	11–11	14–8
Philadelphia	9–13	3–19	5–17	6–16	—	7–15	8–14–1	9–13
Pittsburgh	11–11	11–11	9–13	10–12	15–7	—	10–12	9–13
San Francisco	17–5	10–12	12–10	11–11	14–8–1	12–10	—	9–13
St. Louis	15–7–1	8–14	10–12	8–14	13–9	13–9	13–9	—

=== Opening Day lineup ===
Opening Day starters
#	Name	Position
30	Maury Wills	SS
3	Willie Davis	CF
12	Tommy Davis	3B
4	Duke Snider	RF
9	Wally Moon	LF
5	Norm Larker	1B
43	Charlie Neal	2B
8	John Roseboro	C
53	Don Drysdale	P

=== Notable transactions ===
- May 4, 1961: Don Demeter and Charley Smith were traded by the Dodgers to the Philadelphia Phillies for Turk Farrell and Joe Koppe.
- May 26, 1961: Art Fowler was purchased from the Dodgers by the Los Angeles Angels.
- May 30, 1961: Bob Lillis and Carl Warwick were traded by the Dodgers to the St. Louis Cardinals for Daryl Spencer.

=== Roster ===
1961 Los Angeles Dodgers
Roster
Pitchers: 38 Roger Craig; 53 Don Drysdale; 20 Turk Farrell; 41 Jim Golden; 32 Sandy Koufax; 17 Phil Ortega; 23 Ed Palmquist; 16 Ron Perranoski; 22 Johnny Podres; 37 Ed Roebuck; 51 Larry Sherry; 40 Stan Williams	Catchers: 35 Doug Camilli; 8 John Roseboro; 34 Norm Sherry; Infielders: 28 Bob Aspromonte; 19 Jim Gilliam; 15 Tim Harkness; 14 Gil Hodges; 5 Norm Larker; 11 Bob Lillis; 43 Charlie Neal; 18 Charley Smith; 7 Daryl Spencer; 30 Maury Wills	Outfielders: 12 Tommy Davis; 3 Willie Davis; 7 Don Demeter; 6 Ron Fairly; 25 Frank Howard; 9 Wally Moon; 4 Duke Snider; 54 Carl Warwick; 23 Gordie Windhorn	Manager: 24 Walter Alston; Coaches: 33 Joe Becker; 10 Clay Bryant; 2 Leo Durocher; 27 Pete Reiser

== Player stats ==
= Indicates league leader

=== Batting ===
==== Starters by position ====
Note: Pos = Position; G = Games played; AB = At bats; H = Hits; Avg. = Batting average; HR = Home runs; RBI = Runs batted in

Pos	Player	G	AB	H	Avg.	HR	RBI
C	John Roseboro	128	394	99	.251	18	59
1B	Norm Larker	97	282	76	.270	5	38
2B	Charlie Neal	108	341	80	.235	10	48
SS	Maury Wills	148	613	173	.282	1	31
3B	Daryl Spencer	60	189	46	.243	8	27
LF	Wally Moon	134	463	152	.328	17	88
CF	Willie Davis	128	339	86	.254	12	45
RF	Frank Howard	92	267	79	.296	15	45

==== Other batters ====
Note: G = Games played; AB = At bats; H = Hits; Avg. = Batting average; HR = Home runs; RBI = Runs batted in

Player	G	AB	H	Avg.	HR	RBI
Tommy Davis	132	460	128	.278	15	58
Jim Gilliam	144	439	107	.244	4	32
Ron Fairly	111	245	79	.322	10	48
Duke Snider	85	233	69	.296	16	56
Gil Hodges	109	215	52	.242	8	31
Norm Sherry	47	121	31	.256	5	21
Bob Aspromonte	47	58	14	.241	0	2
Gordie Windhorn	34	33	8	.242	2	6
Doug Camilli	13	30	4	.133	3	4
Don Demeter	15	29	5	.172	1	2
Charley Smith	9	24	6	.250	2	3
Carl Warwick	19	11	1	.091	0	1
Bob Lillis	19	9	1	.111	0	1
Tim Harkness	5	8	4	.500	0	0

=== Pitching ===
==== Starting pitchers ====
Note: G = Games pitched; IP = Innings pitched; W = Wins; L = Losses; ERA = Earned run average; SO = Strikeouts

Player	G	IP	W	L	ERA	SO
Sandy Koufax	42	255.2	18	13	3.52	269
Don Drysdale	40	244.0	13	10	3.69	182
Stan Williams	41	235.1	15	12	3.90	205
Johnny Podres	32	182.2	18	5	3.74	124

==== Other pitchers ====
Note: G = Games pitched; IP = Innings pitched; W = Wins; L = Losses; ERA = Earned run average; SO = Strikeouts

Player	G	IP	W	L	ERA	SO
Roger Craig	40	112.2	5	6	6.15	53
Phil Ortega	4	13.0	0	2	5.54	15

==== Relief pitchers ====
Note: G = Games pitched; W = Wins; L = Losses; SV = Saves; ERA = Earned run average; SO = Strikeouts

Player	G	W	L	SV	ERA	SO
Larry Sherry	53	4	4	15	3.90	79
Turk Farrell	50	6	6	10	5.06	80
Ron Perranoski	53	7	5	6	2.65	56
Jim Golden	28	1	1	0	5.79	18
Ed Roebuck	5	2	0	0	5.00	9
Ed Palmquist	5	0	1	1	6.23	5

== Awards and honors ==
- Gold Glove Award
  - Maury Wills
  - John Roseboro

=== All-Stars ===
- 1961 Major League Baseball All-Star Game – Game 1
  - Maury Wills starter
  - Sandy Koufax reserve
  - John Roseboro reserve
- 1961 Major League Baseball All-Star Game – Game 2
  - Maury Wills starter
  - Don Drysdale reserve
  - Sandy Koufax reserve
  - John Roseboro reserve
- TSN National League All-Star
  - Maury Wills

== Farm system ==
Level	Team	League	Manager
AAA	Omaha Dodgers	American Association	Danny Ozark
AAA	Spokane Indians	Pacific Coast League	Preston Gómez
AA	Atlanta Crackers	Southern Association	Rube Walker
A	Greenville Spinners	South Atlantic League	Roy Hartsfield
B	Salem Dodgers	Northwest League	Stan Wasiak
C	Great Falls Electrics	Pioneer League	Al Ronning
C	Reno Silver Sox	California League	Roy Smalley
D	Artesia Dodgers	Sophomore League	Spider Jorgensen
D	Kokomo Dodgers	Midwest League	Dom Domenichelli
D	Orlando Dodgers	Florida State League	Edward Serrano
D	Panama City Fliers	Alabama–Florida League	George Scherger

LEAGUE CHAMPIONS: Great Falls, Reno
