= 1961 Chicago Cubs season =

1961 Chicago Cubs
- League: National League
- Ballpark: Wrigley Field
- City: Chicago, IL
- Record: 64–90 (.416)
- League place: 7th
- Owners: Philip K. Wrigley
- General managers: John Holland
- Managers: Vedie Himsl (31 games); Harry Craft (16 games); El Tappe (96 games); Lou Klein (11 games)
- Television: WGN-TV (Jack Brickhouse, Vince Lloyd)
- Radio: WGN (Jack Quinlan, Lou Boudreau)

The 1961 Chicago Cubs season was the 90th season of the Chicago Cubs franchise, the 86th in the National League and the 46th at Wrigley Field. In the first season under their College of Coaches, the Cubs finished seventh in the National League with a record of 64–90, 29 games behind the Cincinnati Reds.

== Offseason ==
- January 12, 1961: Billy Cowan was signed as an amateur free agent by the Cubs.

== Regular season ==
=== The College of Coaches ===
This season marked the introduction of the so-called "College of Coaches", a system instituted by owner Philip K. Wrigley after input from El Tappe. Under this system, the Cubs would have no single manager, but instead would have a rotating series of eight coaches, with one managing the team while others served as either assistant coaches or minor league field personnel.

Four different men served as manager during 1961: Tappe, who served the most games in the position and had a record of 42–54; Harry Craft, who had a record of 7–9; Vedie Himsl, who had a record of 10–21; and Lou Klein, who was brought on board in midseason and had a record of 5–6. Other coaches in the system during the season were Charlie Grimm – the team's manager in 1960 – Bobby Adams, Dick Cole, Ripper Collins, Goldie Holt, Fred Martin and Verlon Walker. The team improved to 64–90, four games better than their 1960 record, although none of the four managers posted a winning record individually. The experiment would be carried over into the 1962 season.

=== Season standings ===
National League
Team	W	L	Pct.	GB	Home	Road
Cincinnati Reds	93	61	.604	—	47‍–‍30	46‍–‍31
Los Angeles Dodgers	89	65	.578	4	45‍–‍32	44‍–‍33
San Francisco Giants	85	69	.552	8	45‍–‍32	40‍–‍37
Milwaukee Braves	83	71	.539	10	45‍–‍32	38‍–‍39
St. Louis Cardinals	80	74	.519	13	48‍–‍29	32‍–‍45
Pittsburgh Pirates	75	79	.487	18	38‍–‍39	37‍–‍40
Chicago Cubs	64	90	.416	29	40‍–‍37	24‍–‍53
Philadelphia Phillies	47	107	.305	46	22‍–‍55	25‍–‍52

=== Record vs. opponents ===
1961 National League record Sources:
Team	CHC	CIN	LAD	MIL	PHI	PIT	SF	STL
Chicago	—	12–10	7–15	9–13–1	13–9	11–11	5–17	7–15–1
Cincinnati	10–12	—	12–10	15–7	19–3	11–11	12–10	14–8
Los Angeles	15–7	10–12	—	12–10	17–5	13–9	10–12	12–10
Milwaukee	13–9–1	7–15	10–12	—	16–6	12–10	11–11	14–8
Philadelphia	9–13	3–19	5–17	6–16	—	7–15	8–14–1	9–13
Pittsburgh	11–11	11–11	9–13	10–12	15–7	—	10–12	9–13
San Francisco	17–5	10–12	12–10	11–11	14–8–1	12–10	—	9–13
St. Louis	15–7–1	8–14	10–12	8–14	13–9	13–9	13–9	—

=== Notable transactions ===
- April 1, 1961: Lou Johnson was traded by the Cubs to the Los Angeles Angels for Jim McAnany.
- May 9, 1961: Frank Thomas was traded by the Cubs to the Milwaukee Braves for Mel Roach.
- July 20, 1961: Curt Motton was signed as an amateur free agent by the Cubs.
- September 21, 1961: Paul Casanova was signed as a free agent the Cubs.

=== Roster ===
1961 Chicago Cubs
Roster
Pitchers: 32 Bob Anderson; 48 Jim Brewer; 34 Dick Burwell; 43 Don Cardwell; 42 Jack Curtis; 30 Dick Drott; 37 Dick Ellsworth; 36 Don Elston; 40 Glen Hobbie; 46 Joe Schaffernoth; 41 Barney Schultz; 45 Mel Wright	Catchers: 9 Cuno Barragan; 6 Dick Bertell; 7 Sammy Taylor; 8 Moe Thacker; Infielders: 14 Ernie Banks; 11 Ed Bouchee; 33 Ken Hubbs; 16 Jerry Kindall; 25 Moe Morhardt; 12 Mel Roach; 18 Andre Rodgers; 10 Ron Santo; 17 Don Zimmer	Outfielders: 21 George Altman; 1 Richie Ashburn; 24 Lou Brock; 19 Sammy Drake; 22 Al Heist; 23 Nelson Mathews; 20 Jim McAnany; 27 Danny Murphy; 25 Frank Thomas; 28 Bob Will; 26 Billy Williams; Other batters: 8 George Freese	Head coach: 53 Harry Craft; 54 Vedie Himsl; 60 Lou Klein; 52 El Tappe; Coaches College of Coaches

== Player stats ==
= Indicates team leader

=== Batting ===
==== Starters by position ====
Note: Pos = Position; G = Games played; AB = At bats; H = Hits; Avg. = Batting average; HR = Home runs; RBI = Runs batted in

Pos	Player	G	AB	H	Avg.	HR	RBI
C	Dick Bertell	92	267	73	.273	2	33
1B	Ed Bouchee	112	319	79	.248	12	38
2B	Don Zimmer	128	477	120	.252	13	40
SS	Ernie Banks	138	511	142	.278	29	80
3B	Ron Santo	154	578	164	.284	23	83
LF	Billy Williams	146	529	147	.278	25	86
CF	Al Heist	109	321	82	.255	7	37
RF	George Altman	138	518	157	.303	27	96

==== Other batters ====
Note: G = Games played; AB = At bats; H = Hits; Avg. = Batting average; HR = Home runs; RBI = Runs batted in

Player	G	AB	H	Avg.	HR	RBI
Jerry Kindall	96	310	75	.242	9	44
Richie Ashburn	109	307	79	.257	0	19
Sammy Taylor	89	235	56	.238	8	23
Andre Rodgers	73	214	57	.266	6	23
Bob Will	86	113	29	.257	0	8
Frank Thomas	15	50	13	.260	2	6
Mel Roach	23	39	5	.128	0	1
Moe Thacker	25	35	6	.171	0	2
Cuno Barragan	10	28	6	.214	1	2
Ken Hubbs	10	28	5	.179	1	2
Moe Morhardt	7	18	5	.278	0	1
Danny Murphy	4	13	5	.385	2	3
Lou Brock	4	11	1	.091	0	0
Jim McAnany	11	10	3	.300	0	0
Nelson Mathews	3	9	1	.111	0	0
George Freese	9	7	2	.286	0	1
Sammy Drake	13	5	0	.000	0	0

=== Pitching ===
==== Starting pitchers ====
Note: G = Games pitched; IP = Innings pitched; W = Wins; L = Losses; ERA = Earned run average; SO = Strikeouts

Player	G	IP	W	L	ERA	SO
Don Cardwell	39	259.1	15	14	3.82	156
Glen Hobbie	36	198.2	7	13	4.26	103
Dick Ellsworth	37	186.2	10	11	3.86	91
Jack Curtis	31	180.1	10	13	4.89	57

==== Other pitchers ====
Note: G = Games pitched; IP = Innings pitched; W = Wins; L = Losses; ERA = Earned run average; SO = Strikeouts

Player	G	IP	W	L	ERA	SO
Bob Anderson	57	152.0	7	10	4.26	96
Dick Drott	35	98.0	1	4	4.22	48
Jim Brewer	36	86.2	1	7	5.82	57

==== Relief pitchers ====
Note: G = Games pitched; W = Wins; L = Losses; SV = Saves; ERA = Earned run average; SO = Strikeouts

Player	G	W	L	SV	ERA	SO
Don Elston	58	6	7	8	5.59	59
Barney Schultz	41	7	6	7	2.70	59
Joe Schaffernoth	21	0	4	0	6.34	23
Mel Wright	11	0	1	0	10.71	6
Dick Burwell	2	0	0	0	9.00	0

== Awards and honors ==
All-Star Game

- Don Zimmer, Second Base, Reserve, First and Second Game
- George Altman, Outfield, Reserve, First and Second Game

== Farm system ==
Level	Team	League	Manager
AAA	Houston Buffaloes	American Association	Grady Hatton, Fred Martin, Lou Klein and Harry Craft
AA	San Antonio Missions	Texas League	Ripper Collins, Harry Craft, Bobby Adams and Verlon Walker
B	Wenatchee Chiefs	Northwest League	Verlon Walker, Vedie Himsl, Dick Cole and Bobby Adams
C	St. Cloud Rox	Northern League	Joe Macko
D	Morristown Cubs	Appalachian League	John Fitzpatrick
D	Carlsbad Potashes	Sophomore League	Lou Klein and Walt Dixon

LEAGUE CHAMPIONS: San Antonio
