= 1961 Pittsburgh Pirates season =

1961 Pittsburgh Pirates
- League: National League
- Ballpark: Forbes Field
- City: Pittsburgh, Pennsylvania
- Owners: John W. Galbreath (majority shareholder); Bing Crosby, Thomas P. Johnson (minority shareholders)
- General managers: Joe L. Brown
- Managers: Danny Murtaugh
- Television: KDKA-TV; Bob Prince, Jim Woods
- Radio: KDKA; Bob Prince, Paul Long, Jim Woods

The 1961 Pittsburgh Pirates fell from World Champions the previous season to sixth place in the National League, as they won 75 games and lost 79, 18 games behind NL Champion Cincinnati.

== Regular season ==
=== Season standings ===
National League
Team	W	L	Pct.	GB	Home	Road
Cincinnati Reds	93	61	.604	—	47‍–‍30	46‍–‍31
Los Angeles Dodgers	89	65	.578	4	45‍–‍32	44‍–‍33
San Francisco Giants	85	69	.552	8	45‍–‍32	40‍–‍37
Milwaukee Braves	83	71	.539	10	45‍–‍32	38‍–‍39
St. Louis Cardinals	80	74	.519	13	48‍–‍29	32‍–‍45
Pittsburgh Pirates	75	79	.487	18	38‍–‍39	37‍–‍40
Chicago Cubs	64	90	.416	29	40‍–‍37	24‍–‍53
Philadelphia Phillies	47	107	.305	46	22‍–‍55	25‍–‍52

=== Record vs. opponents ===
1961 National League record Sources:
Team	CHC	CIN	LAD	MIL	PHI	PIT	SF	STL
Chicago	—	12–10	7–15	9–13–1	13–9	11–11	5–17	7–15–1
Cincinnati	10–12	—	12–10	15–7	19–3	11–11	12–10	14–8
Los Angeles	15–7	10–12	—	12–10	17–5	13–9	10–12	12–10
Milwaukee	13–9–1	7–15	10–12	—	16–6	12–10	11–11	14–8
Philadelphia	9–13	3–19	5–17	6–16	—	7–15	8–14–1	9–13
Pittsburgh	11–11	11–11	9–13	10–12	15–7	—	10–12	9–13
San Francisco	17–5	10–12	12–10	11–11	14–8–1	12–10	—	9–13
St. Louis	15–7–1	8–14	10–12	8–14	13–9	13–9	13–9	—

=== Game log ===
1961 Game Log: 75–79 (Home: 38–39; Away: 37–40)
April: 9–6 (Home: 4–2; Away: 5–4)

#	Date	Opponent	Score	Win	Loss	Save	Attendance	Record
1	April 11	@ Giants	8–7	**Face** (1–0)	McCormick	**Labine** (1)	41,423	1–0
2	April 12	@ Giants	1–2	Loes	**Law** (0–1)	Duffalo	7,583	1–1
3	April 13	@ Giants	5–6 (12)	Duffalo	**Face** (1–1)	—	10,910	1–2
4	April 14	@ Dodgers	6–3	**Gibbon** (1–0)	Koufax	**Labine** (2)	28,371	2–2
5	April 15	@ Dodgers	4–1	**Friend** (1–0)	Drysdale	—	36,783	3–2
6	April 16	@ Dodgers	6–13	Williams	**Law** (0–2)	Palmquist	27,716	3–3
7	April 18	Cubs	5–3	**Mizell** (1–0)	Wright	**Face** (1)	30,781	4–3
8	April 19	Cubs	4–1	**Friend** (2–0)	Anderson	—	12,742	5–3
9	April 20	Cubs	0–3	Hobbie	**Gibbon** (1–1)	—	10,428	5–4
10	April 23	Braves	1–3	Spahn	**Law** (0–3)	—	21,249	5–5
11	April 24	Braves	7–6	**Friend** (3–0)	Drabowsky	**Labine** (3)	14,826	6–5
12	April 26	Phillies	3–2	**Mizell** (2–0)	Green	—	9,420	7–5
13	April 29	@ Reds	6–3	**Law** (1–3)	Jay	**Face** (2)	9,173	8–5
14	April 30	@ Reds	6–3	**Friend** (4–0)	Hook	**Face** (3)		9–5
15	April 30	@ Reds	2–4	Purkey	**Gibbon** (1–2)	—	11,743	9–6

May: 12–12 (Home: 7–6; Away: 5–6)

#	Date	Opponent	Score	Win	Loss	Save	Attendance	Record
16	May 2	@ Cardinals	6–0	**Haddix** (1–0)	Broglio	—	6,549	10–6
17	May 3	@ Cardinals	1–3	Gibson	**Mizell** (2–1)	McDaniel	5,611	10–7
18	May 5	Dodgers	0–10	Podres	**Friend** (4–1)	Farrell	25,023	10–8
19	May 6	Dodgers	9–5	**Gibbon** (2–2)	Craig	**Face** (4)	9,736	11–8
20	May 7	Dodgers	2–4	Koufax	**Witt** (0–1)	Sherry	17,363	11–9
21	May 9	Giants	9–6	**Haddix** (2–0)	Sanford	**Labine** (4)	17,250	12–9
22	May 10	Giants	0–3	McCormick	**Friend** (4–2)	—	21,599	12–10
23	May 12	Reds	8–5	**Shantz** (1–0)	Bridges	—	20,662	13–10
24	May 13	Reds	13–5	**Labine** (1–0)	O'Toole	—	13,343	14–10
25	May 14	Reds	1–4	Hunt	**Friend** (4–3)	Brosnan	17,459	14–11
26	May 16	Cardinals	2–1	**Face** (2–1)	Simmons	—	13,578	15–11
27	May 17	Cardinals	4–3	**Mizell** (3–1)	Broglio	**Face** (5)	17,691	16–11
28	May 19	@ Phillies	1–4	Mahaffey	**Friend** (4–4)	—	16,035	16–12
29	May 20	@ Phillies	4–3	**Gibbon** (3–2)	Roberts	**Face** (6)	12,547	17–12
30	May 21	@ Phillies	13–11	**Friend** (5–4)	Ferrarese	—	9,291	18–12
31	May 22	@ Braves	2–1	**Haddix** (3–0)	Buhl	—	10,332	19–12
32	May 23	@ Braves	0–1	Burdette	**Shantz** (1–1)	—	9,367	19–13
33	May 24	@ Cubs	7–3	**Mizell** (4–1)	Ellsworth	**Labine** (5)	5,573	20–13
34	May 26	@ Cardinals	2–12	Simmons	**Friend** (5–5)	—	8,868	20–14
35	May 27	@ Cardinals	5–7	Broglio	**Law** (1–4)	McDaniel	14,941	20–15
36	May 28	@ Cardinals	4–8	Cicotte	**Haddix** (3–1)	—	16,632	20–16
37	May 30	Cubs	3–5	Ellsworth	**Mizell** (4–2)	Elston		20–17
38	May 30	Cubs	0–10	Cardwell	**Friend** (5–6)	—	30,852	20–18
39	May 31	Braves	9–1	**Gibbon** (4–2)	Spahn	—	16,902	21–18

June: 15–13 (Home: 10–9; Away: 5–4)

#	Date	Opponent	Score	Win	Loss	Save	Attendance	Record
40	June 1	Braves	8–2 (7)	**Haddix** (4–1)	Burdette	—	19,128	22–18
41	June 2	Phillies	0–6	Buzhardt	**Friend** (5–7)	—	14,344	22–19
42	June 3	Phillies	5–1	**Shantz** (2–1)	Mahaffey	**Face** (7)	11,153	23–19
43	June 4	Phillies	0–5	Ferrarese	**Mizell** (4–3)	—	27,352	23–20
44	June 5	@ Dodgers	5–2	**Law** (2–4)	Perranoski	**Face** (8)	14,715	24–20
45	June 6	@ Dodgers	7–8	Podres	**Face** (2–2)	Sherry	15,784	24–21
46	June 7	@ Dodgers	3–7	Koufax	**Francis** (0–1)	—	19,967	24–22
47	June 8	@ Dodgers	4–2	**Friend** (6–7)	Williams	**Shantz** (1)	17,599	25–22
48	June 9	@ Giants	6–9	Bolin	**Face** (2–3)	Miller	27,815	25–23
49	June 10	@ Giants	0–5	McCormick	**Mizell** (4–4)	—	26,630	25–24
50	June 11	@ Giants	8–4	**Law** (3–4)	Loes	**Friend** (1)	34,185	26–24
51	June 13	Reds	2–1	**Gibbon** (5–2)	Maloney	—	19,423	27–24
52	June 14	Reds	5–4	**Shantz** (3–1)	Brosnan	—	14,270	28–24
53	June 15	Reds	1–8	Jay	**Mizell** (4–5)	—	19,209	28–25
54	June 16	Cardinals	2–5	Gibson	**Haddix** (4–2)	—	26,229	28–26
55	June 17	Cardinals	9–3	**Shantz** (4–1)	Broglio	—	15,436	29–26
56	June 18	Cardinals	5–3	**Friend** (7–7)	Simmons	**Face** (9)		30–26
57	June 18	Cardinals	3–7	Jackson	**Gibbon** (5–3)	Miller	29,176	30–27
58	June 20	@ Phillies	6–2	**Haddix** (5–2)	Mahaffey	**Face** (10)	10,649	31–27
59	June 22	@ Phillies	5–1	**Friend** (8–7)	Buzhardt	—	9,126	32–27
60	June 23	Phillies	11–12	Lehman	**Francis** (0–2)	Sullivan	16,170	32–28
61	June 24	Phillies	2–6	Short	**Mizell** (4–6)	Sullivan	9,546	32–29
62	June 25	Phillies	10–5	**Face** (3–3)	Baldschun	—		33–29
63	June 25	Phillies	3–4	Mahaffey	**Haddix** (5–3)	Sullivan	10,951	33–30
64	June 27	Dodgers	5–9	Farrell	**Friend** (8–8)	Sherry	25,936	33–31
65	June 28	Dodgers	9–3	**Gibbon** (6–3)	Drysdale	—	21,581	34–31
66	June 29	Dodgers	4–2	**Francis** (1–2)	Koufax	**Face** (11)	21,520	35–31
67	June 30	Giants	4–3	**Face** (4–3)	McCormick	—	31,900	36–31

July: 9–17 (Home: 4–10; Away: 5–7)

#	Date	Opponent	Score	Win	Loss	Save	Attendance	Record
68	July 1	Giants	3–4	Jones	**Friend** (8–9)	—	19,737	36–32
69	July 2	Giants	7–6	**Haddix** (6–3)	McCormick	**Labine** (6)		37–32
70	July 2	Giants	9–0 (7)	**Shantz** (5–1)	Marichal	—	36,093	38–32
71	July 3	@ Reds	3–4	Maloney	**Gibbon** (6–4)	Brosnan	31,839	38–33
72	July 4	@ Reds	0–2	Jay	**Francis** (1–3)	—	11,802	38–34
73	July 6	@ Cubs	15–3	**Friend** (9–9)	Ellsworth	—		39–34
74	July 6	@ Cubs	1–5	Hobbie	**Mizell** (4–7)	—	15,813	39–35
75	July 7	@ Braves	6–5	**McBean** (1–0)	Spahn	**Face** (12)	17,622	40–35
76	July 8	@ Braves	4–3	**Gibbon** (7–4)	Buhl	**Shantz** (2)	16,109	41–35
77	July 9	@ Braves	5–4	**McBean** (2–0)	Burdette	**Face** (13)	20,845	42–35
78	July 13	@ Giants	1–2	Miller	**Friend** (9–10)	—	11,328	42–36
79	July 14	@ Giants	6–4	**Labine** (2–0)	LeMay	**Face** (14)	23,177	43–36
80	July 15	@ Giants	3–8	McCormick	**Haddix** (6–4)	—	22,596	43–37
81	July 16	@ Dodgers	11–12 (10)	Podres	**Face** (4–4)	—	15,930	43–38
82	July 17	@ Dodgers	4–6	Williams	**Friend** (9–11)	Koufax	26,232	43–39
83	July 20	Cubs	4–0	**Gibbon** (8–4)	Curtis	—	13,859	44–39
84	July 21	Braves	3–5	Burdette	**Friend** (9–12)	Nottebart	28,290	44–40
85	July 22	Braves	4–5	Cloninger	**Shantz** (5–2)	Nottebart	16,417	44–41
86	July 23	Braves	4–11	Buhl	**Haddix** (6–5)	—		44–42
87	July 23	Braves	4–5	McMahon	**Friend** (9–13)	—	26,531	44–43
88	July 25	Giants	7–16	Miller	**Gibbon** (8–5)	—	18,698	44–44
89	July 26	Giants	8–3	**Friend** (10–13)	LeMay	—	17,306	45–44
90	July 27	Giants	0–2	Marichal	**Mizell** (4–8)	—	17,885	45–45
91	July 28	Dodgers	4–6	Podres	**Francis** (1–4)	Farrell	25,593	45–46
92	July 29	Dodgers	4–5	Perranoski	**McBean** (2–1)	Farrell	11,822	45–47
93	July 30	Dodgers	3–7	Drysdale	**Gibbon** (8–6)	Perranoski	18,273	45–48

August: 16–16 (Home: 8–7; Away: 8–9)

#	Date	Opponent	Score	Win	Loss	Save	Attendance	Record
94	August 2	@ Cardinals	2–4	Jackson	**Shantz** (5–3)	—	12,048	45–49
95	August 3	@ Cardinals	19–0	**Haddix** (7–5)	Cicotte	—	11,514	46–49
96	August 4	@ Reds	4–5	Brosnan	**Labine** (2–1)	—	27,383	46–50
97	August 5	@ Reds	11–7	**McBean** (3–1)	Hunt	—	12,125	47–50
98	August 6	@ Reds	9–4	**Mizell** (5–8)	Jay	**Labine** (7)		48–50
99	August 6	@ Reds	2–3 (10)	Brosnan	**Face** (4–5)	—	31,167	48–51
100	August 7	@ Phillies	3–1	**Friend** (11–13)	Buzhardt	—	5,586	49–51
101	August 8	@ Phillies	10–2	**Haddix** (8–5)	Mahaffey	—		50–51
102	August 8	@ Phillies	3–2	**Sturdivant** (1–0)	Short	—	11,081	51–51
103	August 9	Cardinals	0–4	Simmons	**Gibbon** (8–7)	Bauta	17,038	51–52
104	August 10	Cardinals	2–3	Sadecki	**Francis** (1–5)	—	13,812	51–53
105	August 11	Phillies	6–0 (7)	**Friend** (12–13)	Roberts	—	12,965	52–53
106	August 12	Phillies	4–0	**Mizell** (6–8)	Owens	—	8,785	53–53
107	August 13	Phillies	13–4	**Sturdivant** (2–0)	Buzhardt	—	12,923	54–53
108	August 14	@ Braves	3–8	Cloninger	**Haddix** (8–6)	—	14,648	54–54
109	August 15	@ Braves	1–4	Willey	**Gibbon** (8–8)	—	16,843	54–55
110	August 16	@ Braves	1–2	Spahn	**Friend** (12–14)	—	18,330	54–56
111	August 17	@ Cubs	4–11	Drott	**Mizell** (6–9)	Anderson		54–57
112	August 17	@ Cubs	4–3	**Francis** (2–5)	Brewer	**Face** (15)	16,961	55–57
113	August 18	@ Cubs	1–2 (11)	Ellsworth	**Sturdivant** (2–1)	—	7,469	55–58
114	August 19	@ Cubs	4–3 (11)	**Labine** (3–1)	Curtis	—	11,777	56–58
115	August 20	@ Cubs	0–1 (11)	Cardwell	**Friend** (12–15)	—	19,038	56–59
116	August 22	Braves	4–1	**Gibbon** (9–8)	Buhl	**Face** (16)	15,874	57–59
117	August 23	Braves	7–6	**Face** (5–5)	Nottebart	—	15,117	58–59
118	August 24	Braves	1–6	Spahn	**Friend** (12–16)	—	16,653	58–60
119	August 25	Cubs	1–0	**Sturdivant** (3–1)	Cardwell	—	12,651	59–60
120	August 26	Cubs	3–7	Schultz	**Face** (5–6)	Anderson	9,137	59–61
121	August 27	Cubs	7–3	**Gibbon** (10–8)	Curtis	**Labine** (8)		60–61
122	August 27	Cubs	5–6	Brewer	**Mizell** (6–10)	Anderson	15,471	60–62
123	August 28	Cubs	4–5	Anderson	**Face** (5–7)	—	13,753	60–63
124	August 29	Reds	0–3	O'Toole	**Friend** (12–17)	Maloney	17,999	60–64
125	August 30	Reds	3–1	**Sturdivant** (4–1)	Purkey	—	20,000	61–64

September: 13–15 (Home: 4–5; Away: 9–10)

#	Date	Opponent	Score	Win	Loss	Save	Attendance	Record
126	September 1	@ Cardinals	4–8	Jackson	**Gibbon** (10–9)	—	13,480	61–65
127	September 2	@ Cardinals	5–4	**Face** (6–7)	McDaniel	—	9,140	62–65
128	September 3	@ Cardinals	8–1	**Friend** (13–17)	Simmons	—	13,817	63–65
129	September 4	@ Cardinals	4–9	Sadecki	**Francis** (2–6)	McDaniel	10,021	63–66
130	September 5	@ Cubs	8–3	**Sturdivant** (5–1)	Hobbie	—	3,417	64–66
131	September 6	@ Cubs	2–6	Cardwell	**Gibbon** (10–10)	—	3,080	64–67
132	September 7	@ Cubs	7–5	**Shantz** (6–3)	Brewer	—	2,752	65–67
133	September 8	@ Braves	2–1	**Friend** (14–17)	Hendley	—	15,606	66–67
134	September 9	@ Braves	3–4	Nottebart	**Face** (6–8)	—	12,320	66–68
135	September 10	@ Braves	3–4	Spahn	**Sturdivant** (5–2)	—	24,198	66–69
136	September 11	@ Giants	3–4 (10)	Sanford	**Face** (6–9)	—	5,512	66–70
137	September 12	@ Giants	3–0	**Gibbon** (11–10)	McCormick	—	9,539	67–70
138	September 13	@ Dodgers	8–2	**Haddix** (9–6)	Farrell	—	10,494	68–70
139	September 14	@ Dodgers	6–7	Roebuck	**Face** (6–10)	—	9,805	68–71
140	September 16	Cardinals	3–6	Sadecki	**Francis** (2–7)	—	6,830	68–72
141	September 17	Cardinals	0–3	Jackson	**McBean** (3–2)	—	10,030	68–73
142	September 18	Cardinals	8–6	**Foss** (1–0)	Gibson	**Face** (17)	8,934	69–73
143	September 19	@ Reds	1–10	O'Toole	**Friend** (14–18)	—	14,225	69–74
144	September 20	@ Reds	2–3	Jay	**Face** (6–11)	—	14,822	69–75
145	September 22	@ Phillies	6–3	**Labine** (4–1)	Sullivan	—	4,687	70–75
146	September 23	@ Phillies	4–5 (16)	Baldschun	**Face** (6–12)	—	4,005	70–76
147	September 24	@ Phillies	4–3	**Mizell** (7–10)	Short	**Sturdivant** (1)	3,282	71–76
148	September 26	Dodgers	3–5	Williams	**Friend** (14–19)	Farrell		71–77
149	September 26	Dodgers	8–0	**Gibbon** (12–10)	Drysdale	—	9,602	72–77
150	September 27	Giants	5–3	**Haddix** (10–6)	Miller	—	7,471	73–77
151	September 28	Giants	4–7	Duffalo	**Francis** (2–8)	Miller	5,384	73–78
152	September 29	Reds	1–8	O'Toole	**Foss** (1–1)	Jones	10,119	73–79
153	September 30	Reds	11–6	**Jackson** (1–0)	Jay	—	7,158	74–79

October: 1–0 (Home: 1–0; Away: 0–0)

#	Date	Opponent	Score	Win	Loss	Save	Attendance	Record
154	October 1	Reds	3–1	**Gibbon** (13–10)	Brosnan	—	26,760	75–79

Legend: = Win = Loss
Bold = Pirates team member

=== Opening Day lineup ===
Opening Day Lineup
#	Name	Position
18	Bill Virdon	CF
24	Dick Groat	SS
4	Bob Skinner	LF
14	Rocky Nelson	1B
21	Roberto Clemente	RF
12	Don Hoak	3B
9	Bill Mazeroski	2B
6	Smoky Burgess	C
19	Bob Friend	SP

=== Notable transactions ===
- May 1961: Don Williams was purchased from the Pirates by the Chicago White Sox.
- June 20, 1961: Gene Baker was released by the Pirates.
- June 24, 1961: Ron Woods was signed by the Pirates as an amateur free agent.

=== Roster ===
1961 Pittsburgh Pirates
**Roster**
**Pitchers**: 34 Tom Cheney; 26 Roy Face; 37 Larry Foss; 27 Earl Francis; 19 Bob Friend; 22 Joe Gibbon; 35 Fred Green; 31 Harvey Haddix; 25 Al Jackson; 29 Clem Labine; 32 Vern Law; 34 Al McBean; 30 Vinegar Bend Mizell; 28 Bobby Shantz; 15 Tom Sturdivant; 37 Jim Umbricht; 39 George Witt	**Catchers**: 6 Smoky Burgess; 2 Don Leppert; 2 Bob Oldis; 5 Hal Smith; **Infielders**: 16 Gene Baker; 24 Dick Groat; 12 Don Hoak; 16 Johnny Logan; 9 Bill Mazeroski; 14 Rocky Nelson; 11 Dick Schofield; 7 Dick Stuart	**Outfielders**: 23 Joe Christopher; 20 Gino Cimoli; 21 Roberto Clemente; 35 Donn Clendenon; 15 Román Mejías; 20 Walt Moryn; 4 Bob Skinner; 18 Bill Virdon	**Manager**: 40 Danny Murtaugh; **Coaches**: 41 Bill Burwell; 45 Lenny Levy; 43 Sam Narron; 42 Ron Northey; 44 Frank Oceak

== Statistics ==
= Indicates team leader

= Indicates league leader

Batting

Note: G = Games played; AB = At bats; H = Hits; Avg. = Batting average; HR = Home runs; RBI = Runs batted in

Regular Season
Player	G	AB	H	Avg.	HR	RBI
J. Umbricht	1	1	1	1.000	0	0
G. Witt	9	2	1	0.500	0	0
B. Shantz	44	16	7	0.438	0	3
R. Clemente	146	572	201	0.351	23	89
D. Clendenon	9	35	11	0.314	0	2
S. Burgess	100	323	98	0.303	12	52
D. Stuart	138	532	160	0.301	35	117
G. Cimoli	21	67	20	0.299	0	6
D. Hoak	145	503	150	0.298	12	61
D. Groat	148	596	164	0.275	6	55
R. Face	62	11	3	0.273	0	1
B. Skinner	119	381	102	0.268	3	42
D. Leppert	22	60	16	0.267	3	5
A. McBean	28	15	4	0.267	1	3
B. Mazeroski	152	558	148	0.265	13	59
J. Christopher	76	186	49	0.263	0	14
V. Law	11	19	5	0.263	0	5
B. Virdon	146	599	156	0.260	9	58
T. Sturdivant	13	32	8	0.250	0	1
J. Logan	27	52	12	0.231	0	5
H. Smith	67	193	43	0.223	3	26
W. Moryn	40	65	13	0.200	3	9
R. Nelson	75	127	25	0.197	5	13
D. Schofield	60	78	15	0.192	0	2
L. Foss	3	6	1	0.167	0	1
H. Haddix	31	56	8	0.143	0	3
B. Friend	41	79	11	0.139	0	7
J. Gibbon	31	59	8	0.136	0	6
V. Mizell	25	23	3	0.130	0	1
E. Francis	23	28	3	0.107	0	0
G. Baker	9	10	1	0.100	0	0
C. Labine	56	10	1	0.100	0	0
F. Green	13	3	0	0.000	0	0
A. Jackson	5	8	0	0.000	0	0
R. Mejias	4	1	0	0.000	0	0
B. Oldis	4	5	0	0.000	0	0
T. Cheney	1	0	0	—	0	0
Team totals	154	5,311	1.448	0.273	128	646

Pitching

Note: G = Games pitched; IP = Innings pitched; W = Wins; L = Losses; ERA = Earned run average; SO = Strikeouts

Regular Season
Player	G	IP	W	L	ERA	SO
T. Cheney	1	0	0	0	—	0
J. Umbricht	1	3 1/3	0	0	2.70	1
T. Sturdivant	13	85 2/3	5	2	2.84	45
J. Gibbon	30	195 1/3	13	10	3.32	145
B. Shantz	43	89 1/3	6	3	3.32	61
A. Jackson	3	23 2/3	1	0	3.42	15
C. Labine	56	92 2/3	4	1	3.69	49
A. McBean	27	74 1/3	3	2	3.75	49
R. Face	62	92	6	12	3.82	55
B. Friend	41	236	14	19	3.85	108
H. Haddix	29	156	10	6	4.10	99
E. Francis	23	102 2/3	2	8	4.21	53
V. Law	11	59 1/3	3	4	4.70	20
F. Green	13	20 2/3	0	0	4.79	4
V. Mizell	25	100	7	10	5.04	37
L. Foss	3	15 1/3	1	1	5.87	9
G. Witt	9	15 2/3	0	1	6.32	9
Team totals	154	1362	75	79	3.92	759

== Farm system ==
Level	Team	League	Manager
AAA	Columbus Jets	International League	Larry Shepard
A	Asheville Tourists	Sally League	Ray Hathaway
B	Burlington Bees	Illinois–Indiana–Iowa League	Harding "Pete" Peterson
C	Grand Forks Chiefs	Northern League	Bob Clear
D	Kingsport Pirates	Appalachian League	Jim Gibbons
D	Batavia Pirates	New York–Penn League	James Adlam and Gene Baker
D	Hobbs Pirates	Sophomore League	Al Kubski
D	Shelby Colonels	Western Carolinas League	Aaron Robinson and James Adlam

LEAGUE CHAMPIONS: Asheville, Hobbs
