= 1961 St. Louis Cardinals season =

Major League Baseball season

1961 St. Louis Cardinals
- League: National League
- Ballpark: Busch Stadium I
- City: St. Louis, Missouri
- Record: 80–74 (.519)
- League place: 5th
- Owners: August "Gussie" Busch
- General managers: Bing Devine
- Managers: Solly Hemus, Johnny Keane
- Television: KPLR (Buddy Blattner, Jerry Gross, Joe Garagiola)
- Radio: KMOX (Harry Caray, Jack Buck, Joe Garagiola)

The 1961 St. Louis Cardinals season was the team's 80th season in St. Louis, Missouri and its 70th season in the National League. The Cardinals went 80–74 during the season and finished fifth in the National League. It was the last season before the NL went to a 162-game schedule the following season to adjust for the new ten-team league.

== Offseason ==
- October 11, 1960: Leon Wagner, Cal Browning, a player to be named later, and cash were traded by the Cardinals to the Toronto Maple Leafs for Al Cicotte. The Cardinals completed the deal by sending Ellis Burton to the Maple Leafs on January 26, 1961.
- December 29, 1960: Marv Grissom was released by the Cardinals.
- March 15, 1961: Red Schoendienst was signed as a free agent by the Cardinals.
- Prior to 1961 season: Don Taussig was acquired by the Cardinals from the Portland Beavers as part of a minor league working agreement.

== Regular season ==
On July 6, with the Cardinals at 33–41, manager Solly Hemus was fired and replaced by Johnny Keane. The team went 47–33 under Keane.

First baseman Bill White and third baseman Ken Boyer won Gold Gloves this year.

=== Season standings ===
National League
Team	W	L	Pct.	GB	Home	Road
Cincinnati Reds	93	61	.604	—	47‍–‍30	46‍–‍31
Los Angeles Dodgers	89	65	.578	4	45‍–‍32	44‍–‍33
San Francisco Giants	85	69	.552	8	45‍–‍32	40‍–‍37
Milwaukee Braves	83	71	.539	10	45‍–‍32	38‍–‍39
St. Louis Cardinals	80	74	.519	13	48‍–‍29	32‍–‍45
Pittsburgh Pirates	75	79	.487	18	38‍–‍39	37‍–‍40
Chicago Cubs	64	90	.416	29	40‍–‍37	24‍–‍53
Philadelphia Phillies	47	107	.305	46	22‍–‍55	25‍–‍52

=== Record vs. opponents ===
1961 National League record Sources:
Team	CHC	CIN	LAD	MIL	PHI	PIT	SF	STL
Chicago	—	12–10	7–15	9–13–1	13–9	11–11	5–17	7–15–1
Cincinnati	10–12	—	12–10	15–7	19–3	11–11	12–10	14–8
Los Angeles	15–7	10–12	—	12–10	17–5	13–9	10–12	12–10
Milwaukee	13–9–1	7–15	10–12	—	16–6	12–10	11–11	14–8
Philadelphia	9–13	3–19	5–17	6–16	—	7–15	8–14–1	9–13
Pittsburgh	11–11	11–11	9–13	10–12	15–7	—	10–12	9–13
San Francisco	17–5	10–12	12–10	11–11	14–8–1	12–10	—	9–13
St. Louis	15–7–1	8–14	10–12	8–14	13–9	13–9	13–9	—

=== Notable transactions ===
- May 10, 1961: Bob Nieman was traded by the Cardinals to the Cleveland Indians for Joe Morgan, a player to be named later, and cash. The Indians sent Mike Lee to the Cardinals on June 1 to complete the trade.
- May 16, 1961: Duke Carmel was traded by the Cardinals to the Los Angeles Dodgers for Joe Koppe.
- May 30, 1961: Daryl Spencer was traded by the Cardinals to the Los Angeles Dodgers for Bob Lillis and Carl Warwick.

=== Roster ===
1961 St. Louis Cardinals
Roster
Pitchers: 47,18 Craig Anderson; 38 Ed Bauta; 32 Ernie Broglio; 33 Al Cicotte; 45 Bob Gibson; 39 Larry Jackson; 41 Lindy McDaniel; 38,19 Mickey McDermott; 36 Bob Miller; 37 Ray Sadecki; 31 Curt Simmons; 43 Bobby Tiefenauer; 44 Ray Washburn	Catchers: 34 Chris Cannizzaro; 20 Tim McCarver; 29 Gene Oliver; 1 Carl Sawatski; 4 Jimmie Schaffer; 9 Hal Smith; Infielders: 14 Ken Boyer; 17 Jerry Buchek; 19 Julio Gotay; 10 Alex Grammas; 25 Julián Javier; 35 Bob Lillis; 2 Red Schoendienst; 20 Daryl Spencer; 12 Bill White	Outfielders: 40 Doug Clemens; 15 Joe Cunningham; 21 Curt Flood; 23 Charlie James; 24 Don Landrum; 28 Walt Moryn; 6 Stan Musial; 4 Bob Nieman; 24 Ed Olivares; 27 Don Taussig; 24,42 Carl Warwick; Other batters: 18 George Crowe	Manager: 7 Solly Hemus; 5 Johnny Keane; Coaches: 8 Vern Benson; 8 Darrell Johnson; 5 Johnny Keane; 26 Howie Pollet; 3 Harry Walker

== Player stats ==
=== Batting ===
==== Starters by position ====
Note: Pos = Position; G = Games played; AB = At bats; H = Hits; Avg. = Batting average; HR = Home runs; RBI = Runs batted in

Pos	Player	G	AB	H	Avg.	HR	RBI
C	Jimmie Schaffer	68	153	39	.255	1	16
1B	Bill White	153	591	169	.286	20	90
2B	Julián Javier	113	445	124	.279	2	41
SS	Bob Lillis	86	230	50	.217	0	21
3B	Ken Boyer	153	589	194	.329	24	95
LF	Stan Musial	123	372	107	.288	15	70
CF	Curt Flood	132	335	108	.322	2	21
RF	Joe Cunningham	113	322	92	.286	7	40

==== Other batters ====
Note: G = Games played; AB = At bats; H = Hits; Avg. = Batting average; HR = Home runs; RBI = Runs batted in

Player	G	AB	H	Avg.	HR	RBI
Charlie James	108	349	89	.255	4	44
Don Taussig	98	188	54	.287	2	25
Carl Sawatski	86	174	52	.299	10	33
Alex Grammas	89	170	36	.212	0	21
Carl Warwick	55	152	38	.250	4	16
Daryl Spencer	37	130	33	.254	4	21
Hal Smith	45	125	31	.248	0	10
Red Schoendienst	72	120	36	.300	1	12
Jerry Buchek	31	90	12	.133	0	9
Tim McCarver	22	67	16	.239	1	6
Don Landrum	28	66	11	.167	1	3
Gene Oliver	22	52	14	.269	4	9
Julio Gotay	10	45	11	.244	0	5
Walt Moryn	17	32	4	.125	0	2
Ed Olivares	21	30	5	.167	0	1
Bob Nieman	6	17	8	.471	0	2
Doug Clemens	6	12	2	.167	0	0
George Crowe	7	7	1	.143	0	0
Chris Cannizzaro	6	2	1	.500	0	0

=== Pitching ===
==== Starting pitchers ====
Note: G = Games pitched; IP = Innings pitched; W = Wins; L = Losses; ERA = Earned run average; SO = Strikeouts

Player	G	IP	W	L	ERA	SO
Ray Sadecki	31	222.2	14	10	3.72	114
Bob Gibson	35	211.1	13	12	3.24	166
Larry Jackson	33	211.0	14	11	3.75	113
Curt Simmons	30	195.2	9	10	3.13	99
Ernie Broglio	29	174.2	9	12	4.12	113

==== Other pitchers ====
Note: G = Games pitched; IP = Innings pitched; W = Wins; L = Losses; ERA = Earned run average; SO = Strikeouts

Player	G	IP	W	L	ERA	SO
Al Cicotte	29	75.0	2	6	5.28	51
Bob Miller	34	74.1	1	3	4.24	39
Ray Washburn	3	20.1	1	1	1.77	12

==== Relief pitchers ====
Note: G = Games pitched; W = Wins; L = Losses; SV = Saves; ERA = Earned run average; SO = Strikeouts

Player	G	W	L	SV	ERA	SO
Lindy McDaniel	55	10	6	9	4.87	65
Craig Anderson	25	4	3	1	3.26	21
Mickey McDermott	19	1	0	4	3.67	15
Ed Bauta	13	2	0	5	1.40	12
Bobby Tiefenauer	3	0	0	0	6.23	3

== Farm system ==
Level	Team	League	Manager
AAA	San Juan/Charleston Marlins	International League	Joe Schultz
AAA	Portland Beavers	Pacific Coast League	Vern Benson and Ray Katt
AA	Tulsa Oilers	Texas League	Whitey Kurowski
A	Lancaster Red Roses	Eastern League	Chase Riddle
C	Winnipeg Goldeyes	Northern League	Grover Resinger and Owen Friend
C	Billings Mustangs	Pioneer League	Owen Friend and Grover Resinger
D	Johnson City Cardinals	Appalachian League	Ed Lyons, George Kissell, Charlie Frey, Mo Mozzali and Johnny Grodzicki
D	Keokuk Cardinals	Midwest League	Al Unser

San Juan franchise moved to Charleston (WV), May 19, 1961
