= 1961 Milwaukee Braves season =

1961 Milwaukee Braves
- League: National League
- Ballpark: Milwaukee County Stadium
- City: Milwaukee, Wisconsin
- Record: 83–71 (.539)
- League place: 4th
- Owners: Louis R. Perini
- General managers: John McHale
- Managers: Chuck Dressen 71–58 (.550); Birdie Tebbetts 12–13 (.480)
- Radio: WEMP (Earl Gillespie, Blaine Walsh)

The 1961 Milwaukee Braves season was the ninth in Milwaukee and the 91st overall season of the franchise.

The fourth-place Braves finished the season with an 83–71 (.539) record, ten games behind the National League champion Cincinnati Reds. The home attendance at County Stadium was 1,101,411, fifth in the eight-team National League. It was the Braves' lowest attendance to date in Milwaukee, and was the last season surpassing one million fans.

== Offseason ==
- October 14, 1960: Red Schoendienst was released by the Braves.
- October 14, 1960: Stan Lopata was released by the Braves.
- December 3, 1960: Billy Martin was purchased by the Braves from the Cincinnati Reds.
- December 14, 1960: Joe Azcue was purchased by the Braves from the Cincinnati Reds.
- Prior to 1961 season (exact date unknown)
  - Jim Campbell was traded by the Braves to the Houston Colt .45s for Morrie Martin.
  - Clay Carroll was signed by the Braves as an amateur free agent.

== Regular season ==
On April 28, Warren Spahn threw a no-hitter against the San Francisco Giants.

On June 8, against the Cincinnati Reds, four consecutive Braves batters hit home runs off pitchers Jim Maloney (two) and Marshall Bridges (two more) in the seventh inning. The batters who accomplished this feat were Eddie Mathews, Hank Aaron, Joe Adcock, and Frank Thomas. Oddly, both Adcock and Thomas were former players for the Reds.

=== Season standings ===
National League
Team	W	L	Pct.	GB	Home	Road
Cincinnati Reds	93	61	.604	—	47‍–‍30	46‍–‍31
Los Angeles Dodgers	89	65	.578	4	45‍–‍32	44‍–‍33
San Francisco Giants	85	69	.552	8	45‍–‍32	40‍–‍37
Milwaukee Braves	83	71	.539	10	45‍–‍32	38‍–‍39
St. Louis Cardinals	80	74	.519	13	48‍–‍29	32‍–‍45
Pittsburgh Pirates	75	79	.487	18	38‍–‍39	37‍–‍40
Chicago Cubs	64	90	.416	29	40‍–‍37	24‍–‍53
Philadelphia Phillies	47	107	.305	46	22‍–‍55	25‍–‍52

=== Record vs. opponents ===
1961 National League record Sources:
Team	CHC	CIN	LAD	MIL	PHI	PIT	SF	STL
Chicago	—	12–10	7–15	9–13–1	13–9	11–11	5–17	7–15–1
Cincinnati	10–12	—	12–10	15–7	19–3	11–11	12–10	14–8
Los Angeles	15–7	10–12	—	12–10	17–5	13–9	10–12	12–10
Milwaukee	13–9–1	7–15	10–12	—	16–6	12–10	11–11	14–8
Philadelphia	9–13	3–19	5–17	6–16	—	7–15	8–14–1	9–13
Pittsburgh	11–11	11–11	9–13	10–12	15–7	—	10–12	9–13
San Francisco	17–5	10–12	12–10	11–11	14–8–1	12–10	—	9–13
St. Louis	15–7–1	8–14	10–12	8–14	13–9	13–9	13–9	—

=== Notable transactions ===
- April 1961: Morrie Martin was released by the Braves.
- May 9, 1961: Mel Roach was traded by the Braves to the Chicago Cubs for Frank Thomas.
- May 10, 1961: Wes Covington was selected off waivers from the Braves by the Chicago White Sox.
- June 1, 1961: Billy Martin was traded by the Braves to the Minnesota Twins for Billy Consolo.

=== Managerial turnover ===
Chuck Dressen, 66, was fired on September 2, less than a month shy of finishing his second year as the Braves' manager. The club was in third place at 71–58 (.550), seven games behind the league-leading Cincinnati Reds, when the change was announced after a Saturday home win over the Dodgers. The Braves were 159–124 (.562) under Dressen's command.

His successor was executive vice president Birdie Tebbetts, 48, a former Cincinnati manager, who came down from the Milwaukee front office to take the reins; the Braves went 12–13 (.480) under him to finish the season. Tebbetts was signed through the 1963 season but he would spend only 1962 as the Braves' skipper before leaving to become manager of the Cleveland Indians in 1963. Tebbetts retained two of Dressen's coaches, Andy Pafko and Whit Wyatt, while George Myatt departed for the American League Detroit Tigers.

=== Roster ===
1961 Milwaukee Braves
Roster
Pitchers: 43 Johnny Antonelli; 30 George Brunet; 10 Bob Buhl; 33 Lew Burdette; 40 Tony Cloninger; 17 Moe Drabowsky; 36 Bob Hendley; 36 Ken MacKenzie; 20 Don McMahon; 19 Seth Morehead; 32 Don Nottebart; 40 Chi-Chi Olivo; 35 Ron Piché; 35 Claude Raymond; 21 Warren Spahn; 16 Carl Willey	Catchers: 1 Del Crandall; 6 Charley Lau; 40 Phil Roof; 15 Joe Torre; 22 Sammy White; Infielders: 9 Joe Adcock; 2 Frank Bolling; 3 Bob Boyd; 23 Johnny Logan; 18 Félix Mantilla; 41 Eddie Mathews; 11 Roy McMillan	Outfielders: 44 Hank Aaron; 19 Gino Cimoli; 43 Wes Covington; 29 John DeMerit; 30 Mack Jones; 24 Lee Maye; 12 Mel Roach; 25 Al Spangler; 26 Hawk Taylor; 12 Frank Thomas; Other batters: 30 Neil Chrisley; 3 Billy Martin	Manager: 7 Chuck Dressen; 4 Birdie Tebbetts; Coaches: 8 George Myatt; 48 Andy Pafko; 5 Whit Wyatt

== Player stats ==
=== Batting ===
= Indicates team leader

==== Starters by position ====
Note: Pos = Position; G = Games played; AB = At bats; H = Hits; Avg. = Batting average; HR = Home runs; RBI = Runs batted in

Pos	Player	G	AB	H	Avg.	HR	RBI
C	Joe Torre	113	406	113	.278	10	42
1B	Joe Adcock	152	562	160	.285	35	108
2B	Frank Bolling	148	585	153	.262	15	56
SS	Roy McMillan	154	505	111	.220	7	48
3B	Eddie Mathews	152	572	175	.306	32	91
LF	Frank Thomas	124	423	120	.284	25	67
CF	Hank Aaron	155	603	197	.327	34	120
RF	Lee Maye	110	373	101	.271	14	41

==== Other batters ====
Note: G = Games played; AB = At bats; H = Hits; Avg. = Batting average; HR = Home runs; RBI = Runs batted in

Player	G	AB	H	Avg.	HR	RBI
Gino Cimoli	37	117	23	.197	3	4
Mack Jones	28	104	24	.231	0	12
Al Spangler	68	97	26	.268	0	6
Félix Mantilla	45	93	20	.215	1	5
Charley Lau	28	82	17	.207	0	5
John DeMerit	32	74	12	.162	2	5
Sammy White	21	63	14	.222	0	5
Bob Boyd	36	41	10	.244	0	3
Mel Roach	13	36	6	.167	1	6
Del Crandall	15	30	6	.200	0	1
Hawk Taylor	20	26	5	.192	1	1
Wes Covington	9	21	4	.190	0	0
Johnny Logan	18	19	2	.105	0	1
Neil Chrisley	10	9	2	.222	0	0
Billy Martin	6	6	0	.000	0	0
Phil Roof	1	0	0	----	0	0

=== Pitching ===
= Indicates league leader

==== Starting pitchers ====
Note: G = Games pitched; IP = Innings pitched; W = Wins; L = Losses; ERA = Earned run average; SO = Strikeouts

Player	G	IP	W	L	ERA	SO
Lew Burdette	40	272.1	18	11	4.00	92
Warren Spahn	38	262.2	21	13	3.02	115
Bob Buhl	32	188.1	9	10	4.11	77
Bob Hendley	19	97.0	5	7	3.90	44

==== Other pitchers ====
Note: G = Games pitched; IP = Innings pitched; W = Wins; L = Losses; ERA = Earned run average; SO = Strikeouts

Player	G	IP	W	L	ERA	SO
Carl Willey	35	159.2	6	12	3.83	91
Don Nottebart	38	126.1	6	7	4.06	66
Tony Cloninger	19	84.0	7	2	5.25	51

==== Relief pitchers ====
Note: G = Games pitched; W = Wins; L = Losses; SV = Saves; ERA = Earned run average; SO = Strikeouts

Player	G	W	L	SV	ERA	SO
Don McMahon	53	6	4	8	2.84	55
Moe Drabowsky	16	0	2	2	4.62	5
Claude Raymond	13	1	0	2	3.98	13
Ron Piché	12	2	2	1	3.47	16
Seth Morehead	12	1	0	0	6.46	13
Johnny Antonelli	9	1	0	0	7.59	8
Ken MacKenzie	5	0	1	0	5.14	5
George Brunet	5	0	0	0	5.40	0
Chi-Chi Olivo	3	0	0	0	18.00	1

== Awards and honors ==
=== League leaders ===
- Warren Spahn, National League leader, wins

== Farm system ==
Level	Team	League	Manager
AAA	Louisville Colonels	American Association	Ben Geraghty
AAA	Vancouver Mounties	Pacific Coast League	Billy Hitchcock
AA	Austin Senators	Texas League	Bill Adair
B	Cedar Rapids Braves	Illinois–Indiana–Iowa League	Jimmy Brown
B	Yakima Bears	Northwest League	Buddy Hicks
C	Eau Claire Braves	Northern League	Jim Fanning
C	Boise Braves	Pioneer League	Gordon Maltzberger
D	Palatka Azaleas	Florida State League	Mike Fandozzi
D	Quad Cities Braves	Midwest League	Alex Monchak
D	Wellsville Braves	New York–Penn League	Bill Steinecke
D	Newton-Conover Twins	Western Carolinas League	Joe Abernethy

LEAGUE CHAMPIONS: Louisville
