= Al Kenders =

American baseball player (1937-2013)

- Catcher
- Born: April 4, 1937; Barrington, New Jersey, U.S.
- Died: January 7, 2013 (aged 75); Burbank, California, U.S.
- Batted: Right Threw: Right

MLB debut
- August 14, 1961, for the Philadelphia Phillies

Last MLB appearance
- September 25, 1961, for the Philadelphia Phillies

MLB statistics
- Batting average: .174
- Home runs: 0
- Runs batted in: 1
- Stats at Baseball Reference

Teams
- Philadelphia Phillies (1961)

Albert Daniel George Kenders (April 4, 1937 – January 7, 2013) was an American professional baseball player. A catcher, he played for eight seasons (1956–1963) in the Philadelphia Phillies' farm system, with a ten-game, 23-at bat Major League trial for the 1961 Phillies. He batted and threw right-handed, stood 6 feet (1.8 m) tall and weighed 185 pounds (84 kg) as an active player.

Previous to his major league career, Kenders played both football and baseball at Haddon Heights High School, which he graduated from in 1956. In 1954, he won the New Jersey State Championship with the Brooklawn American Legion team. He went on to play in the semi-pro Camden County League, where he hit .536 with 13 home runs as a catcher. This caught the attention of the local baseball club, the Philadelphia Phillies, and scout Jocko Collins signed Kenders to a deal with the team.

In 1961, Kenders started four games at catcher for the Phillies after a mid-season recall from the Double-A Chattanooga Lookouts. In his second game, he recorded his first MLB hit, a single off pitcher Jack Curtis of the Chicago Cubs. He would notch only three more hits during his Major League service, with the only extra-base blow, a double, coming off future Baseball Hall of Fame southpaw Warren Spahn on August 20, 1961.

He batted .259 with 33 home runs in 655 minor league games.

In 1983, Kenders was featured on a baseball card in the third and final "One Year Winners" series put out by Topps.
