= Charley Smith =

American baseball player (1937–1994)

- Third baseman
- Born: September 15, 1937; Charleston, South Carolina, U.S.
- Died: November 29, 1994 (aged 57); Reno, Nevada, U.S.
- Batted: Right Threw: Right

MLB debut
- September 8, 1960, for the Los Angeles Dodgers

Last MLB appearance
- April 22, 1969, for the Chicago Cubs

MLB statistics
- Batting average: .239
- Home runs: 69
- Runs batted in: 281
- Stats at Baseball Reference

Teams
- Los Angeles Dodgers (1960–1961); Philadelphia Phillies (1961); Chicago White Sox (1962–1964); New York Mets (1964–1965); St. Louis Cardinals (1966); New York Yankees (1967–1968); Chicago Cubs (1969)

Charles William Smith (September 15, 1937 – November 29, 1994), born in Charleston, South Carolina, was an American professional baseball third baseman. He played in Major League Baseball for the Los Angeles Dodgers, Philadelphia Phillies, Chicago White Sox, New York Mets, St. Louis Cardinals, New York Yankees, and Chicago Cubs from 1960 to 1969.

== Brooklyn Dodgers signee ==
Smith was one of the last players to sign with the Brooklyn Dodgers before their move to Los Angeles. He was originally a shortstop, but switched over to third base in 1960 with the Spokane Indians. Over four seasons in their farm system, Smith batted .293 with 73 home runs and 330 runs batted in. He debuted with the Los Angeles Dodgers as a September call up in 1960. Though he went hitless in his major league debut, he had two RBIs. In eighteen games, he was 10-for-60 with five RBIs.

In his first start of 1961, Smith took the St. Louis Cardinals' Curt Simmons to left center field for his first major league home run. He made his first major league start at short in the second game of an April 30 doubleheader with the Chicago Cubs, and committed a throwing error.

== Philadelphia Phillies ==
Twenty games into the 1961 season, the Dodgers traded Smith and outfielder Don Demeter to the Philadelphia Phillies for relief pitcher Turk Farrell and infielder Joe Koppe on 4 May. Smith found himself in a three way battle (with Bob Sadowski & Jim Woods) for the starting third base job upon his arrival in Philadelphia, but he won the job by mid June. He batted .248 with nine home runs and 47 RBIs for a Phillies team that lost 107 games. During the off season, he and pitcher John Buzhardt were traded to the Chicago White Sox for slugging first baseman Roy Sievers.

== Chicago White Sox ==
After Smith got off to an 0-for-26 start in 1962, ChiSox manager Al López shifted left fielder Al Smith (who had some experience at third) to third base, and Charley to the bench. He appeared in 65 games, and batted .207 with two home runs and seventeen RBIs. The highlight of his White Sox career was a 3-for-4 performance against the Los Angeles Angels on June 5. Smith broke up a 1–1 tie in the third with an RBI single. After the Angels took a 5–3 lead, Smith tied the game with another single that drove in two. In the ninth, his third single of the day drove in the winning run.

On April 16, 1963, Smith struck out as a pinch hitter. After which, he was optioned down to the triple A Indianapolis Indians, where he would spend the remainder of the season. He received a September call up, and was 2-for-6 with an RBI triple in his return.

== New York Mets ==
Two games into the 1964 season, Smith was dealt to the New York Mets for shortstop Chico Fernández and minor league catcher Bobby Catton. With the Mets, Smith once again had a starting job with a team that would lose 100 games.

Though he went hitless in his first 25 at bats as a Met, Hall of Fame manager Casey Stengel stuck with Smith, and he soon emerged as the top slugger on the team. He went 3-for-6 with a home run and five RBIs and two runs scored in the Mets' 19-1 drubbing of the Cubs on May 26. On August 17, his two home runs drove in four of the Mets' five runs in their shutout of the Pittsburgh Pirates.

All told, his twenty home runs were a career best, and also led the team. His 58 RBIs were second to Joe Christopher's 76. He committed 31 errors, 23 of which at third, giving him a .917 fielding percentage at his primary position.

The 1965 Mets were 50-112, the second worst record in franchise history. Smith got off to another slow start in 1965. He batted .160 with four RBIs in April. His first home run on May 14 off the Cincinnati Reds' Joe Nuxhall was a game winner. His next two home runs also came against Cincinnati, one in each game of a May 16 doubleheader sweep.

For the season, Smith batter .244 with a team leading 62 RBIs. His sixteen home runs were second to rookie Ron Swoboda's nineteen. His glove also improved substantially; he only made eighteen errors at third for a .957 fielding percentage (league average was .951). After the season, he and pitcher Al Jackson were traded to the Cardinals for former National League Most Valuable Players Ken Boyer.

== St. Louis Cardinals ==
Taking over for a Cards legend, Smith homered in his second game as a Cardinal. His one season in St. Louis, he batted a career best .266 with a career best .964 fielding percentage. His performance was good enough to catch the eye of New York Yankees General Manager Lee MacPhail, who traded Roger Maris for Smith in a one-for-one swap on December 8, 1966.

== New York Yankees ==
A little over a week before acquiring Smith, the Yankees traded away 1966 starting third baseman Clete Boyer. The pressure of replacing two stars overwhelmed Smith. His .224 batting average, nine home runs and 38 RBIs in 1967 were all career lows since he became a starter. He also regressed defensively, committing 21 errors.

The Yankees acquired third baseman Bobby Cox from the Atlanta Braves after the season. Smith became a reserve, making just 77 plate appearances, and received most of his playing time as a pinch hitter. He was 10-for-31 with four RBIs in that role. Overall, he batted .229. His one home run of the season was a walk off against Wilbur Wood on September 10.

== Chicago Cubs ==
After the season, he was traded to the San Francisco Giants for second baseman Nate Oliver. Toward the end of Spring training, 1969, the Giants sold his contract to the Cubs. He appeared in just two games with the Cubs, spending most of his time in the Pacific Coast League with the Tacoma Cubs, however, those two games earned him the distinction of having been the first baseball player to play for both Chicago and both New York franchises.

== Career statistics ==
Games	PA	AB	Runs	Hits	2B	3B	HR	RBI	SB	BB	SO	Avg.	OBP	OPS	Fld%	WAR
771	2686	2484	228	594	83	18	69	281	7	130	565	.239	.279	.649	.944	4.9

== Private life ==
Smith made his home in Reno, Nevada, where he made his professional baseball debut at age 19 with the Class C Reno Silver Sox. He and his wife, Carol had two children, a son, Brian, and a daughter, Suzanne. He died suddenly on November 29, 1994 at age 57 from a blood clot after undergoing knee surgery. He is also survived by two brothers and seven grandchildren.
