= 1961 San Francisco Giants season =

1961 San Francisco Giants
- League: National League
- Ballpark: Candlestick Park
- City: San Francisco
- Record: 89–65 (.578)
- League place: 3rd
- Owners: Horace Stoneham
- General managers: Chub Feeney
- Managers: Alvin Dark
- Television: KTVU (Russ Hodges, Lon Simmons)
- Radio: KSFO (Russ Hodges, Lon Simmons, Bill King)

The 1961 San Francisco Giants season was the Giants' 79th year in Major League Baseball, their fourth season in San Francisco since their move from New York following the 1957 season, and their second season at Candlestick Park. The team finished in third place in the National League with an 85 wins and 69 losses record, eight games behind the NL Champion Cincinnati Reds. The Giants were managed by Alvin Dark. As of 2021, this remains the only Giants season in franchise history in which two players (Orlando Cepeda and Willie Mays) each hit 40 or more home runs.

== Regular season ==
Willie Mays had both a three home run game (on June 29) and a four home run game (on April 30) during the 1961 season. Mays became the ninth player, and first Giant, in MLB history to hit four home runs in one game.

=== Season standings ===
National League
Team	W	L	Pct.	GB	Home	Road
Cincinnati Reds	93	61	.604	—	47‍–‍30	46‍–‍31
Los Angeles Dodgers	89	65	.578	4	45‍–‍32	44‍–‍33
San Francisco Giants	85	69	.552	8	45‍–‍32	40‍–‍37
Milwaukee Braves	83	71	.539	10	45‍–‍32	38‍–‍39
St. Louis Cardinals	80	74	.519	13	48‍–‍29	32‍–‍45
Pittsburgh Pirates	75	79	.487	18	38‍–‍39	37‍–‍40
Chicago Cubs	64	90	.416	29	40‍–‍37	24‍–‍53
Philadelphia Phillies	47	107	.305	46	22‍–‍55	25‍–‍52

=== Record vs. opponents ===
1961 National League record Sources:
Team	CHC	CIN	LAD	MIL	PHI	PIT	SF	STL
Chicago	—	12–10	7–15	9–13–1	13–9	11–11	5–17	7–15–1
Cincinnati	10–12	—	12–10	15–7	19–3	11–11	12–10	14–8
Los Angeles	15–7	10–12	—	12–10	17–5	13–9	10–12	12–10
Milwaukee	13–9–1	7–15	10–12	—	16–6	12–10	11–11	14–8
Philadelphia	9–13	3–19	5–17	6–16	—	7–15	8–14–1	9–13
Pittsburgh	11–11	11–11	9–13	10–12	15–7	—	10–12	9–13
San Francisco	17–5	10–12	12–10	11–11	14–8–1	12–10	—	9–13
St. Louis	15–7–1	8–14	10–12	8–14	13–9	13–9	13–9	—

=== Opening Day starters ===
- Felipe Alou
- Ed Bressoud
- Orlando Cepeda
- Tom Haller
- Chuck Hiller
- Sam Jones
- Harvey Kuenn
- Willie Mays
- Willie McCovey

=== Roster ===
1961 San Francisco Giants
Roster
Pitchers: 42 Bob Bolin; 45 Jim Duffalo; 39 Eddie Fisher; 19 Sam Jones; 39 Dick LeMay; 28 Billy Loes; 27 Juan Marichal; 40 Mike McCormick; 37 Stu Miller; 31 Billy O'Dell; 33 Jack Sanford; 36 Dom Zanni	Catchers: 6 Ed Bailey; 51 Tom Haller; 5 Hobie Landrith; 34 John Orsino; 9 Bob Schmidt; Infielders: 14 Joey Amalfitano; 21 Ernie Bowman; 16 Ed Bressoud; 30 Orlando Cepeda; 12 Jim Davenport; 26 Chuck Hiller; 25 Jim Marshall; 44 Willie McCovey; 15 José Pagán	Outfielders: 23 Felipe Alou; 41 Matty Alou; 18 Bob Farley; 7 Harvey Kuenn; 24 Willie Mays; Other batters: 10 Don Blasingame	Manager: 1 Alvin Dark; Coaches: 46 Larry Jansen; 6,3 Whitey Lockman; 2 Salty Parker; 3,9 Wes Westrum

== Player stats ==
= Indicates team leader

= Indicates league leader

=== Batting ===
==== Starters by position ====
Note: Pos = Position; G = Games played; AB = At bats; H = Hits; Avg. = Batting average; HR = Home runs; RBI = Runs batted in

Pos.	Player	G	AB	H	R	Avg.	HR	RBI
C	Ed Bailey	107	340	81	39	.238	13	51
1B	Willie McCovey	106	328	89	59	.271	18	50
2B	Joey Amalfitano	109	384	98	64	.255	2	23
SS	José Pagán	134	434	110	38	.253	5	46
3B	Jim Davenport	137	436	121	64	.278	12	65
LF	Harvey Kuenn	131	471	125	60	.265	5	46
CF	Willie Mays	154	572	176	129	.308	40	123
RF	Felipe Alou	132	415	120	59	.289	18	52

==== Other batters ====
Note: G = Games played; AB = At bats; H = Hits; Avg. = Batting average; HR = Home runs; RBI = Runs batted in

Player	G	AB	H	Avg.	HR	RBI
Orlando Cepeda	152	585	182	.311	46	142
Chuck Hiller	70	240	57	.238	2	12
Matty Alou	81	200	62	.310	6	24
Ed Bressoud	59	114	24	.211	3	11
John Orsino	25	83	23	.277	4	12
Hobie Landrith	43	71	17	.239	2	10
Tom Haller	30	62	9	.145	2	8
Ernie Bowman	38	38	8	.211	0	2
Jim Marshall	44	36	8	.222	1	7
Bob Farley	13	20	2	.100	0	1
Bob Schmidt	2	6	1	.167	0	1
Don Blasingame	3	1	0	.000	0	0

=== Pitching ===
==== Starting pitchers ====
Note: G = Games pitched; IP = Innings pitched; W = Wins; L = Losses; ERA = Earned run average; SO = Strikeouts

Player	G	IP	W	L	ERA	SO
Mike McCormick	40	250.0	13	16	3.20	163
Jack Sanford	38	217.1	13	9	4.22	112
Juan Marichal	29	185.0	13	10	3.89	124

==== Other pitchers ====
Note: G = Games pitched; IP = Innings pitched; W = Wins; L = Losses; ERA = Earned run average; SO = Strikeouts

Player	G	IP	W	L	ERA	SO
Billy O'Dell	46	130.1	7	5	3.59	110
Sam Jones	37	128.1	8	8	4.49	105
Billy Loes	26	114.2	6	5	4.24	55
Dick LeMay	27	83.1	3	6	3.56	54

==== Relief pitchers ====
Note: G = Games pitched; W = Wins; L = Losses; SV = Saves; ERA = Earned run average; SO = Strikeouts

Player	G	W	L	SV	ERA	SO
Stu Miller	63	14	5	17	2.66	89
Bobby Bolin	37	2	2	5	3.19	48
Jim Duffalo	24	5	1	1	4.23	37
Eddie Fisher	15	0	2	1	5.35	16
Dom Zanni	8	1	0	0	3.95	11

== Awards and honors ==
All-Star Game (first game) All-Star Game (second game)

== Farm system ==
Level	Team	League	Manager
AAA	Tacoma Giants	Pacific Coast League	Red Davis
AA	Rio Grande Valley/Victoria Giants	Texas League	Ray Murray
A	Springfield Giants	Eastern League	Andy Gilbert
B	Eugene Emeralds	Northwest League	Richie Klaus
C	Fresno Giants	California League	Sal Taormina
C	Pocatello Bannocks	Pioneer League	Bert Thiel
D	Salem Rebels	Appalachian League	Jodie Phipps
D	Quincy Giants	Midwest League	Buddy Kerr
D	El Paso Sun Kings	Sophomore League	George Genovese
D	Belmont Chiefs	Western Carolinas League	Jim Poole, Whitey Ries and Max Lanier

LEAGUE CHAMPIONS: Tacoma, Springfield, Quincy

Rio Grande Valley club moved to Victoria, June 10, 1961; Pocatello affiliation shared with Kansas City Athletics
