= 1961 Major League Baseball All-Star Game =

1961 Major League Baseball All-Star Game may refer to:

- 1961 Major League Baseball All-Star Game (first game), National League 5, American League 4; played on July 11 at Candlestick Park in San Francisco
- 1961 Major League Baseball All-Star Game (second game), National League 1, American League 1; played on July 31 at Fenway Park in Boston
