= Dick Burwell =

American baseball player (1940–2023)

- Pitcher
- Born: January 23, 1940; Alton, Illinois, U.S.
- Died: May 1, 2023 (aged 83); Phoenix, Arizona, U.S.
- Batted: Right Threw: Right

MLB debut
- September 13, 1960, for the Chicago Cubs

Last MLB appearance
- September 17, 1961, for the Chicago Cubs

MLB statistics
- Win–loss record: 0–0
- Earned run average: 6.59
- Strikeouts: 1
- Stats at Baseball Reference

Teams
- Chicago Cubs (1960–1961)

Richard Matthew Burwell (January 23, 1940 – May 1, 2023) was an American professional baseball pitcher. A right-hander, Burwell pitched parts of two seasons in Major League Baseball, 1960 and 1961, for the Chicago Cubs. The native of Alton, Illinois, attended Illinois Wesleyan University. He was listed as 6 feet 1 inch (1.85 m) tall and 190 pounds (86 kg).

Burwell's pro career lasted for seven years (1959–1965), all in the Cubs' organization. He appeared in a total of five major league games, including one start, his maiden MLB appearance on September 13, 1960, against the Cincinnati Reds at Crosley Field. Burwell allowed six earned runs in five innings pitched on six hits (including home runs by Gordy Coleman and Eddie Kasko) and three bases on balls. He left the game for a pinch hitter with the Cubs trailing 6–4. However, he was not charged with the loss: the Cubs tied the score at six after Burwell's exit, and the decisive run in Chicago's 8–6 defeat was charged to relief pitcher Don Elston.

In Burwell's two late-season big-league trials, he allowed 17 hits and 11 bases on balls in 132/3 innings pitched, with one strikeout. He did not earn a decision and posted an earned run average of 6.59.

Burwell died in Arizona on May 1, 2023, at the age of 83.
