= Jim Woods (baseball) =

American baseball player (born 1939)

- Third baseman
- Born: September 17, 1939 (age 86); Chicago, Illinois, U.S.
- Batted: Right Threw: Right

MLB debut
- September 27, 1957, for the Chicago Cubs

Last MLB appearance
- June 23, 1961, for the Philadelphia Phillies

MLB statistics
- Batting average: .207
- Home runs: 3
- Runs batted in: 12
- Stats at Baseball Reference

Teams
- Chicago Cubs (1957); Philadelphia Phillies (1960–1961)

James Jerome Woods (born September 17, 1939), nicknamed "Woody", is an American former professional baseball player. He played parts of three seasons in Major League Baseball, primarily as a third baseman. He threw and batted right-handed and during his playing career was measured at 6 feet (1.8 m) tall and 175 pounds (79 kg).

Woods' eight-year (1957–64) professional career included parts of three seasons with the Chicago Cubs (1957) and Philadelphia Phillies (1960–61), but he spent portions or all of those eight seasons toiling in minor league baseball. In the majors, he appeared in 36 games, collecting 17 hits, including three doubles and three home runs.

Woods was included in a notable trade between the Cubs and Phillies on January 11, 1960, when he was packaged with veteran shortstop Alvin Dark and pitcher John Buzhardt in a trade for the Phillies' veteran center fielder (and future Hall of Famer) Richie Ashburn.
