= Ken Hunt (pitcher) =

American baseball player (1938–2008)

- Pitcher
- Born: December 14, 1938; Ogden, Utah, U.S.
- Died: January 27, 2008 (aged 69); Morgan, Utah, U.S.
- Batted: Right Threw: Right

MLB debut
- April 16, 1961, for the Cincinnati Reds

Last MLB appearance
- September 30, 1961, for the Cincinnati Reds

MLB statistics
- Win–loss record: 9–10
- Earned run average: 3.96
- Strikeouts: 75
- Stats at Baseball Reference

Teams
- Cincinnati Reds (1961)

Kenneth Raymond Hunt Jr. (December 14, 1938 – January 27, 2008) was an American starting pitcher who played one full Major League Baseball season for the 1961 Cincinnati Reds. Listed at 6 feet 4 inches (1.93 m) tall and 200 pounds (91 kg), Hunt batted and threw right-handed. He overcame control problems to reach the major leagues with the Reds in 1961, starting games for the National League champions. He won The Sporting News Rookie Pitcher of the Year Award and appeared in the World Series, which the Reds lost in five games to the New York Yankees. However, his control problems resurfaced in the minor leagues after that, and he never appeared in another major league game. Following his career, he coached baseball and basketball at Morgan High School in Utah for 20 years.

== Early life ==
Hunt was born to Kenneth Sr. and Wanda Hunt in Ogden, Utah. He grew up in that city, getting named to the All-State baseball and basketball teams while attending Ogden High School. After high school, he received baseball and basketball scholarships to Brigham Young University but only went to the institution for a year at the time before starting his professional baseball career. He would later become the first Cougar to make it to the major leagues.

== Career ==
Hunt signed a contract with the Cincinnati Redlegs before the 1958 season after getting spotted by one of the scouts for Redlegs' general manager Gabe Paul. He began his minor league career that year with the Class C Visalia Redlegs of the California League. Hunt struggled with control, prompting Visalia manager Dave Bristol to phone the Redlegs' front office and ask, "Do I really have to pitch this guy that often? They're gonna run me out of town." The front office told him to keep it up, believing the solution to Hunt's control problems was experience. He spent the whole year with Visalia but did not stick in the starting rotation, only starting seven of his 21 games. 75 walks in 54 innings pitched contributed to a 2–5 record and an earned run average (ERA) of 9.00. Next season, Hunt remained with Visalia. Once again, he had more walks (185) than innings pitched (150), and his record was 4–14. However, he lowered his ERA to 6.66 and struck out 160 batters. Sometime in 1959, he married Carol Nelson; later, the couple had their marriage solemnized at the Salt Lake Temple.

The repeated use began to pay off with the Columbia Reds of the Class A South Atlantic League in 1960. Hunt shoved his walk total down to 134, even as his innings pitched rose to 211, in 30 starts. He spent the whole year in Columbia's rotation, winning 16 games (to only six losses) and striking out 221. This earned him a spot at spring training for the Reds in 1961.

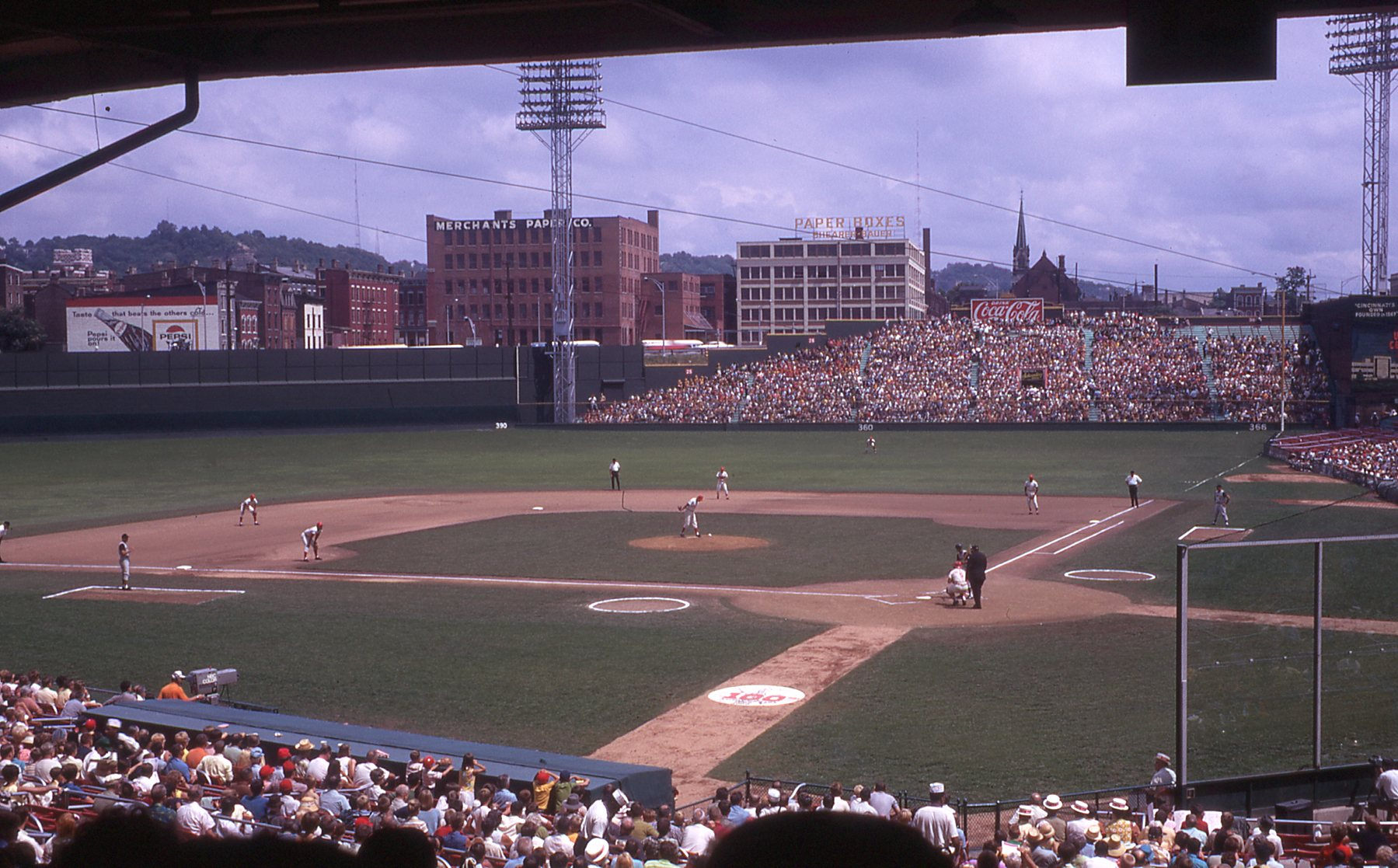
Crosley Field was the site of Hunt's home games with the Reds in 1961.

Despite his improvement, Hunt was not expected to make the Reds' roster in 1961. Fred Hutchinson, the manager, did not even bother to mention Hunt in a pre-season news release where he discussed rookies to watch. However, Hunt's improved control helped him win a spot in the Reds' starting rotation. His first game actually was not a start, but a relief outing in which he filled in for Reds' ace Jim O'Toole, in a 5–3 loss to the St. Louis Cardinals on April 16. Three days later, he made his first start and got his first career win, giving up two runs (one earned) in eight innings in a 4–2 victory over the San Francisco Giants. On May 23, despite allowing five hits and six walks in 7 2/3 innings, he held the Los Angeles Dodgers scoreless, beating Don Drysdale in a 2–0 victory. Hunt got off to a fast start, sporting an 8–3 record and a 2.73 ERA through his first 14 games (13 as a starter). However, after that, he struggled to a 1–7 record and a 6.27 ERA over the rest of the season (though he only walked 22 in 47 1/3 innings over that time). He started only one game after August 5 as the Reds went to a four-man rotation down the stretch. Despite his late fade, Hunt won The Sporting News Rookie Pitcher of the Year Award after going 9–10 with 75 strikeouts in 136⅓ innings of work. The Reds surprised experts (Sports Illustrated said they had 25–1 odds of winning the pennant before the season) by finishing in first place in the National League, earning a trip to the World Series against the New York Yankees. Not needed as a starter, Hunt made only one appearance, striking out one and walking one in the ninth inning of the fifth and final game, a blowout 13–5 loss.

Hunt was mentioned in Sports Illustrated's preview of the 1962 Reds as a backup for the Big Three starters of Joey Jay, O'Toole, and Bob Purkey. However, he did not pitch for the Reds that year. In fact, he never pitched in the major leagues again. Hunt did throw in the minor leagues, pitching 16 games (14 starts) between the Reds' Class A affiliate (now the Macon Peaches) and the San Diego Padres of the Class AAA Pacific Coast League. He had a 2–8 record between those teams, with a 7.67 ERA, and his control problems returned, as he walked 80 in 61 innings. Strangely, he gave up fewer earned runs per game at San Diego (3.46 ERA) than at Macon (10.80 ERA).

In 1963, Hunt again split the season between Macon (now a Class AA affiliate) and San Diego, though he only pitched two games for the Padres. In 19 games (18 starts), he had a 7–9 record, a 4.50 ERA, 56 strikeouts, and 89 walks in 88 innings. He spent all of 1964 with Macon, which switched to the Southern League. In 25 games (14 starts), he had a 7–6 record, a 4.59 ERA, 69 strikeouts, and 63 walks in 98 innings.

Cincinnati switched its AA affiliate to the Knoxville Smokies of the Southern League in 1965, and Hunt pitched one final season for them, losing two games and posting a 6.92 ERA in 12 games (four starts). He also got spent time with the Baltimore Orioles' organization that season, giving up five runs in three innings of three games for the Class AAA Rochester Red Wings of the International League that year. His career ended at the age of 26, with him having pitched one season in the major leagues.

== Later life ==
Following his baseball career, Hunt earned his bachelor's degree from Brigham Young University, then taught English and coached basketball and baseball at Morgan High School in Utah from 1983 through 2003. As a basketball coach, he was twice named Utah's 2A coach of the year. In 2004, he was grateful to be inducted into the Utah Sports Hall of Fame. He and his wife had three children: Ken III, Jennifer, and Adam. An avid sportsman, he liked to fish, hunt and camp. Hunt also was an enthusiastic Utah Jazz fan who would shout at the TV while watching their games. Hunt died in Morgan at age 69 while in hospice.
