= Walt Moryn =

American baseball player (1926–1996)

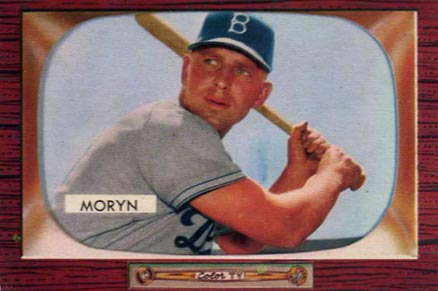
- Outfielder
- Born: April 12, 1926; Saint Paul, Minnesota, U.S.
- Died: July 21, 1996 (aged 70); Winfield, Illinois, U.S.
- Batted: Left Threw: Right

MLB debut
- June 29, 1954, for the Brooklyn Dodgers

Last MLB appearance
- September 28, 1961, for the Pittsburgh Pirates

MLB statistics
- Batting average: .266
- Home runs: 101
- Runs batted in: 354
- Stats at Baseball Reference

Teams
- Brooklyn Dodgers (1954–1955); Chicago Cubs (1956–1960); St. Louis Cardinals (1960–1961); Pittsburgh Pirates (1961)

Career highlights and awards
- All-Star (1958)

Walter Joseph "Moose" Moryn (April 12, 1926 – July 21, 1996) was an American professional baseball player who was an outfielder in Major League Baseball (MLB). A native of St. Paul, Minnesota, Moryn's professional baseball career began in 1948 after he served in the United States Navy in the Pacific Theater of Operations during World War II. He played in the Majors from 1954 through 1961 for the Brooklyn Dodgers, Chicago Cubs, St. Louis Cardinals and Pittsburgh Pirates. He stood 6 feet 2 inches (1.88 m) tall and weighed 205 pounds (93 kg), batted left-handed and threw right-handed.

Moryn appeared in 785 games played over eight big-league seasons, collecting 667 hits, with 116 doubles, 16 triples and 101 home runs. He had 354 runs batted in, and batted .266. He spent four successive seasons (1956–59) as a regular outfielder for the Cubs, the first two as a right fielder and the latter pair as a left fielder, and he swatted 82 of his career homers during that period.

Moryn's career highlight was a dramatic shoe-string catch on the last out of the May 15, 1960, no-hitter by Don Cardwell of the Cubs. Cardwell's gem came in his Cubs debut after being acquired in a trade. Moryn himself was traded exactly a month later, at the trading deadline, when he was sent to the Cardinals. He was a member of the National League team for the 25th anniversary 1958 All-Star Game, but did not play in the game.

Moryn died of a heart attack in Winfield, Illinois, at the age of 70, and is buried in Assumption Cemetery in Wheaton.

== Sources ==
- Career statistics from MLB, or Baseball Reference, or Baseball Reference (Minors)
