= Joe Gibbon =

American baseball player (1935–2019)

- Pitcher
- Born: April 10, 1935; Hickory, Mississippi, U.S.
- Died: February 20, 2019 (aged 83); Newton, Mississippi, U.S.
- Batted: Right Threw: Left

MLB debut
- April 17, 1960, for the Pittsburgh Pirates

Last MLB appearance
- July 11, 1972, for the Houston Astros

MLB statistics
- Win–loss record: 61–65
- Earned run average: 3.52
- Strikeouts: 743
- Stats at Baseball Reference

Teams
- Pittsburgh Pirates (1960–1965); San Francisco Giants (1965–1969); Pittsburgh Pirates (1969–1970); Cincinnati Reds (1971–1972); Houston Astros (1972)

Career highlights and awards
- World Series champion (1960)

Joseph Charles Gibbon (April 10, 1935 – February 20, 2019) was an American professional baseball player. A left-handed pitcher, he spent all or parts of 13 seasons (1960–72) in Major League Baseball as a member of the Pittsburgh Pirates, San Francisco Giants, Cincinnati Reds and Houston Astros. Gibbon was born in Hickory, Mississippi.

== Career in sports ==
An alumnus of the University of Mississippi, where he was a standout in both baseball and basketball, Gibbon signed with the Pirates in 1957. In 1959, his third minor league season, he won 16 of 25 decisions for the Triple-A Columbus Jets, posted a strong 3.22 earned run average, and hurled 11 complete games and four shutouts in 28 starting pitcher assignments. He led the International League in strikeouts with 152.

His performance helped Gibbon win a spot on the roster of the 1960 Pirates, for whom he pitched in 27 games (including nine starts). He was the winning pitcher in his first two big-league games (as a relief pitcher) and during the year posted a 4–2 record for a Pirate team that captured the 1960 National League pennant by seven games. In the 1960 World Series, Gibbon worked in Games 2 and 3 (both lopsided losses to the New York Yankees) and surrendered three earned runs (on a three-run home run by Mickey Mantle in Game 2) in three full innings pitched. However, the Pirates won the Series in seven games, on Bill Mazeroski's walk-off Game 7 home run.

Apart from three games pitched for the 1962 Kinston Eagles of the Class B Carolina League, Gibbon spent the remainder of his pro career in the big leagues. In his sophomore season, 1961 with Pittsburgh, he set personal bests in wins (13), games started (29), complete games (seven), shutouts (three), strikeouts (145) and innings pitched (1951/3). As his career progressed (and especially after his December 1965 trade to the Giants), Gibbon became more of a relief specialist. He did not make any starts after the 1967 season.

When he returned to the Pirates in June 1969, he pitched out of the Pittsburgh bullpen through 1970, appearing in two games of the 1970 National League Championship Series against Cincinnati and working a total of one-third of an inning. Released at the end of October, Gibbon joined the Reds in 1971 and posted a 2.94 ERA and tying his career-best mark for saves with 11.

During his MLB career, Gibbon compiled a 61–65 record with a 3.52 earned run average and 743 strikeouts in 1,1192/3 innings pitched; he allowed 1,053 hits and 414 bases on balls. He made 419 total appearances, 127 as a starting pitcher, and logged 20 complete games, four shutouts and 32 career saves.

== Death ==
Gibbon died on February 20, 2019, at his home south of Newton, Mississippi after a short illness.
