= Carl Willey =

American baseball player (1931–2009)

- Pitcher
- Born: June 6, 1931; Cherryfield, Maine, U.S.
- Died: July 20, 2009 (aged 78); Ellsworth, Maine, U.S.
- Batted: Right Threw: Right

MLB debut
- April 30, 1958, for the Milwaukee Braves

Last MLB appearance
- September 26, 1965, for the New York Mets

MLB statistics
- Win–loss record: 38–58
- Earned run average: 3.76
- Strikeouts: 493
- Stats at Baseball Reference

Teams
- Milwaukee Braves (1958–1962); New York Mets (1963–1965)

Carlton Francis Willey (June 6, 1931 – July 20, 2009) was an American professional baseball pitcher who played eight seasons in Major League Baseball (MLB) with the Milwaukee Braves and New York Mets.

Willey was a native of Cherryfield, Maine, who threw and batted right-handed, stood 6 feet (1.8 m) tall and weighed 175 pounds (79 kg). He missed the first three months of the 1964 season after having his jaw broken by a line drive hit by Gates Brown during a spring training game. After his playing career ended, Carlton Willey served as a scout for the Philadelphia Phillies.

Willey died of lung cancer on July 20, 2009, in Ellsworth, Maine.
