= Bob Buhl =

American baseball player (1928–2001)

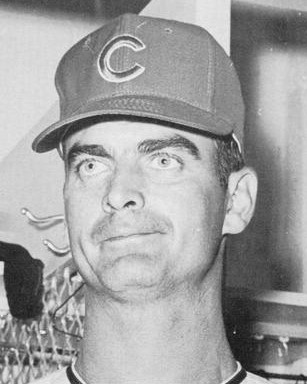
- Pitcher
- Born: August 12, 1928; Saginaw, Michigan, U.S.
- Died: February 16, 2001 (aged 72); Titusville, Florida, U.S.
- Batted: Right Threw: Right

MLB debut
- April 17, 1953, for the Milwaukee Braves

Last MLB appearance
- April 30, 1967, for the Philadelphia Phillies

MLB statistics
- Win–loss record: 166–132
- Earned run average: 3.55
- Strikeouts: 1,268
- Stats at Baseball Reference

Teams
- Milwaukee Braves (1953–1962); Chicago Cubs (1962–1966); Philadelphia Phillies (1966–1967)

Career highlights and awards
- 2× All-Star (1960, 1960²); World Series champion (1957)

Robert Ray Buhl (/bjuːl/ BEWL; August 12, 1928 – February 16, 2001) was an American right-handed starting pitcher in Major League Baseball who played with the Milwaukee Braves, Chicago Cubs, and Philadelphia Phillies.

== Early life ==
Buhl was born on August 12, 1928, in Saginaw, Michigan. Buhl attended Saginaw High School, where he starred on the baseball team 1942–1946, and was a pitcher and played first base on the school's baseball team. He was also a lineman on the school's football team.

== Professional career ==
=== Multiple signings and minor leagues ===
Buhl signed with the Chicago White Sox in 1946. In 1947, Buhl pitched for the Madisonville Miners, the White Sox affiliate in the Class-D Kentucky-Illinois-Tennessee League. He had a 19–10 won–loss record and 3.00 earned run average (ERA).

Baseball commissioner A. B. "Happy" Chandler's office investigated whether the White Sox violated major league rules by signing Buhl before he graduated high school, even though he had finished playing high school sports. In early 1948, Chandler declared Buhl a free agent, and fined the White Sox $500, because Buhl signed with the White Sox before actually graduating high school in January 1947 (not graduating in June 1946 because he needed more credits). Buhl was heavily pursued by scouts from major league teams, but the White Sox were forbidden from re-signing him. At the end of February, Buhl signed with the Boston Braves, via a two-year contract with their Triple-A farm team the Milwaukee Brewers. He was assigned to play for his hometown Saginaw Bears of the Single-A Central League, under general manager and executive vice president Earle W. Halstead, who was involved with scouting and signing Buhl.

In his 1948 Saginaw season, Buhl had an 11–12 record with a 5.22 ERA in 1948. Buhl played for the Single-A Hartford Chiefs in 1949, going 8–8 with a 4.43 ERA. In 1950, he was assigned to the Double-A Dallas Eagles, under manager Charlie Grimm, where Buhl was 8–14 with a 3.47 ERA.

=== Military service ===
Buhl was in military service in 1951-52, during the Korean War. He was a paratrooper and made 19 jumps in Korea. He did play baseball for Fort Campbell and Hartsville teams during his time of service.

=== Major leagues ===
==== Milwaukee Braves ====
Buhl joined the Braves for the 1953 season, once again under manager Charlie Grimm. He appeared in 30 games, starting 18, with a 13–8 record and 2.97 ERA. Even after two years of military service, this was lower than any ERA he posted in the minor leagues from 1947-50. In 1954, however, Buhl went 2–7, with a 4.00 ERA, starting 14 of the 31 games in which he appeared. In 1955, he improved to 13–11, with a 3.21 ERA while starting 27 of the 38 games in which he appeared.

In 1956 with the Braves, Buhl went 18–8, starting 33 games with a 3.32 ERA. Buhl compiled an 8–1 record against the National League (NL) champion Brooklyn Dodgers in 1956. The Braves finished second in the National League, one game behind the Dodgers, with a pitching staff that also included future Hall of Fame pitcher Warren Spahn (20–11) and Lew Burdette (19–10). Buhl was 23rd in Most Valuable Player voting that year, with teammates future Hall of Fame great Hank Aaron 3rd, Spahn 4rth, Joe Adcock 11th, and Burdette 22nd.

He repeated as an 18-game winner the following year (18–7), with a league high .720 winning percentage. He was also fourth in the league with a 2.74 ERA. Spahn was 21–11 and won the Cy Young Award, Burdette was 17–9, and Aaron was the NL's Most Valuable Player. Buhl was third in the Cy Young voting and 14th in the 1957 NL MVP voting, behind teammates Aaron, Spahn (5th), future Hall of Fame third baseman Eddie Mathews (8th), and ahead of Burdette (24) and Johnny Logan (25). The Braves won the NL title in 1957, and defeated the New York Yankees in the World Series, 4–3, with Burdette as the Most Valuable Player in the World Series. Buhl started two games in the World Series, losing one, and pitching only 3.1 innings.

Buhl had a sore shoulder in 1958, and did not play from May 14 through August 31. He only appeared in 11 games, after starting 31 games a year earlier. He was 5–2 with a 3.45 ERA. He returned on September 1, and pitched a complete game victory over the Chicago Cubs, 2–1. He pitched in three more regular seasons game, going 1–2, never pitching more than 5.1 innings in any of those games. The Braves played the Yankees again in the 1958 World Series, this time losing 3–4. Buhl did not play in the 1958 World Series.

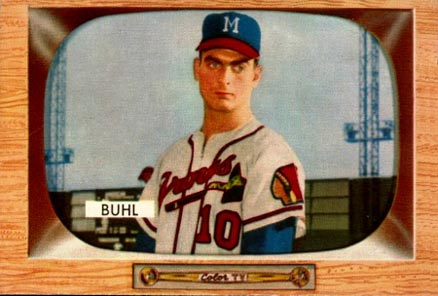
1955 Bowman baseball card of Buhl

In 1959, Buhl won 15 game, losing only nine, with a 2.86 ERA (lowest among all Braves starters). Buhl's four shutouts tied with six others (including Spahn and Burdette) for the NL lead. The Braves finished in second place, two games behind the Dodgers. He had another productive season in 1960, when he finished with a 16–9 record, and a 3.09 ERA. He was selected to play in both 1960 All-Star games, pitching only in the July 11 game. In 1961, his record fell to 9–10 with a 4.11 ERA.

==== Chicago Cubs and Philadelphia Phillies ====
On April 30, 1962, Buhl was traded to the Cubs for Jack Curtis, after appearing in just one game for the Braves. He had 12 wins against 13 losses, a considerably better percentage than the 9th-place Cubs (59–103 .364) achieved overall that year. In 1962, Buhl failed to get a hit in 70 at-bats, the worst single-season batting performance in major league history. Baseball author Bill James named Buhl as the worst hitting pitcher of the 1950s. For his career, Buhl had a batting average of .089, with just two extra-base hits (both doubles) in 857 at-bats, for a slugging percentage of .091.

From 1963–1965 he went 11–14, 15–14 and 13–11 for the Cubs, with ERAs of 3.38, 3.83 and 4.39 respectively. After pitching in only one game for the Cubs in 1966, he was traded with Larry Jackson to the Philadelphia Phillies in 1966 in a deal that brought future Hall-of-Famer Ferguson Jenkins, Adolfo Phillips and John Hernstein to Chicago. In 1966 with the Phillies he pitched in 32 games, starting 18, with a 6–8 record and 4.77 ERA. In his final season, Buhl pitched only three innings before being released on May 16, 1967.

=== Career ===
In his 15-year professional career Buhl posted a 166–132 record with 1,288 strikeouts and a 3.55 ERA in 2,587 innings. He pitched 111 complete games and compiled 20 shutouts.

Fellow pitcher Sal Maglie observed, "Buhl gets wild when he's hit a little."

== Honors ==
In October 1957, Saginaw held Bob Buhl Day. He was among the inaugural class of the Saginaw County Hall of Fame in 2002.

== Death ==
Buhl died in Titusville, Florida, on February 16, 2001, just two days before the death of his Braves roommate Eddie Mathews.
