= Ed Palmquist =

American baseball player (1933–2010)

- Pitcher
- Born: June 10, 1933; Los Angeles, California, U.S.
- Died: July 10, 2010 (aged 77); Santa Maria, California, U.S.
- Batted: Right Threw: Right

MLB debut
- June 10, 1960, for the Los Angeles Dodgers

Last MLB appearance
- June 11, 1961, for the Minnesota Twins

MLB statistics
- Win–loss record: 1–3
- Earned run average: 5.11
- Strikeouts: 41
- Stats at Baseball Reference

Teams
- Los Angeles Dodgers (1960–1961); Minnesota Twins (1961); Daimai Orions (1963)

Edwin Lee Palmquist (June 10, 1933 – July 10, 2010) was an American middle relief pitcher who played from 1960 through 1961 in Major League Baseball. Listed at 6 ft 3 in (1.91 m), 195 lb (88 kg), Palmquist batted and threw right-handed. A native of Los Angeles, he attended Susan Miller Dorsey High School. He signed with the Brooklyn Dodgers as a free agent in 1951.

Palmquist entered the majors in 1960 with the Los Angeles Dodgers, playing for them in 1960–1961 before joining the Minnesota Twins (1961). He posted a 1–3 record with a 5.11 earned run average in 36 pitching appearances, including two starts, allowing 47 runs (39 earned) on 77 hits while walking 36 batters and striking out 41 in 68 2/3 innings of work.

In 1963, Palmquist pitched in Japan for the Daimai Orions. He also saw action in the minor leagues with the Santa Barbara Dodgers (1951–52), Newport News Dodgers (1955), Kokomo Dodgers (1956), Great Falls Electrics (1957), Spokane Indians (1958, 1960), St. Paul Saints (1959) and Vancouver Mounties (1962), registering a mark of 28–36 with a 3.58 ERA in 551 innings.

After retiring, Palmquist became a longtime resident of Grant's Pass, Oregon. He died at the age of 77 in Santa Maria, California.

Palmquist unwittingly played a large role in Dodgers history during 1961 spring training. He was meant to be one of three pitchers who were supposed to make the trip to Orlando, Florida for a B-squad game against the Minnesota Twins on March 23. Palmquist overslept and missed the flight, leaving the team one pitcher short and was fined $25 by manager Walter Alston. In Orlando, acting manager Gil Hodges informed that day's starting pitcher Sandy Koufax that, with one pitcher short, he was going to go seven innings instead of the previously planned five. The game would prove to be a turning point Koufax's career, beginning a six-year run in which he would dominate Major League Baseball.
