= John Buzhardt =

American baseball player (1936–2008)

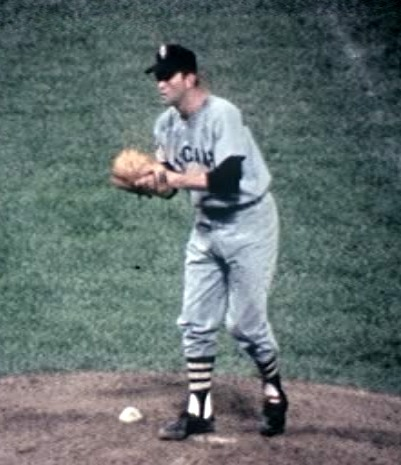
- Pitcher
- Born: August 17, 1936; Prosperity, South Carolina, U.S.
- Died: June 15, 2008 (aged 71); Prosperity, South Carolina, U.S.
- Batted: Right Threw: Right

MLB debut
- September 10, 1958, for the Chicago Cubs

Last MLB appearance
- September 29, 1968, for the Houston Astros

MLB statistics
- Win–loss record: 71–96
- Earned run average: 3.66
- Strikeouts: 678
- Stats at Baseball Reference

Teams
- Chicago Cubs (1958–1959); Philadelphia Phillies (1960–1961); Chicago White Sox (1962–1967); Baltimore Orioles (1967); Houston Astros (1967–1968)

John William Buzhardt (August 17, 1936 – June 15, 2008) was an American professional baseball right-handed pitcher, who played in Major League Baseball (MLB) for the Chicago Cubs, Philadelphia Phillies, Chicago White Sox, Baltimore Orioles and Houston Astros from 1958 through 1968.

== Career ==
Buzahrdt's 15-year pro career began in the Cubs' farm system in 1954.

His best MLB season came while pitching for the 1965 White Sox, when he won 13 games and lost eight. Buzhardt's career win–loss record was 71–96 and he had a 3.66 earned run average (ERA). The 6 ft 2 in (1.88 m), 195 lb (88 kg) Buzhardt appeared in 326 MLB games, 200 as a starting pitcher, with 44 complete games and 15 shutouts; in 1,4902/3 innings pitched, he struck out 678, allowing 1,425 hits and 457 bases on balls.

On June 21, 1959, while pitching for the Cubs, Buzhardt pitched a 4–0 one-hitter against the Phillies, allowing only a third-inning single by Carl Sawatski, and facing just 28 batters (one over the minimum). On July 28, 1961, in the second game of a doubleheader at Connie Mack Stadium, he pitched a complete game, 3–2 victory over the San Francisco Giants. The Phillies then lost their next 23 games, setting a modern-day major league record for consecutive losses. They finally won a game on August 20, with Buzhardt pitching another complete game, defeating the Milwaukee Braves 7–4, at Milwaukee County Stadium, also in the second game of a doubleheader.

== Later life ==
After his baseball career, he returned to his native Prosperity, South Carolina, working as a foreman for the Kodak Company. Buzhardt died in Prosperity on June 15, 2008, at the age of 71.
