= Jack Curtis (baseball) =

American baseball player (1937–2025)

- Pitcher
- Born: January 11, 1937; Rhodhiss, North Carolina, U.S.
- Died: May 12, 2025 (aged 88); Granite Falls, North Carolina, U.S.
- Batted: Left Threw: Left

MLB debut
- April 22, 1961, for the Chicago Cubs

Last MLB appearance
- May 1, 1963, for the Cleveland Indians

MLB statistics
- Win–loss record: 14–19
- Earned run average: 4.84
- Strikeouts: 108
- Stats at Baseball Reference

Teams
- Chicago Cubs (1961–1962); Milwaukee Braves (1962); Cleveland Indians (1963)

Jack Patrick Curtis (January 11, 1937 – May 12, 2025) was an American professional baseball player and left-handed pitcher who worked in 69 games in Major League Baseball for the Chicago Cubs (1961–62), Milwaukee Braves (1962), and Cleveland Indians (1963). He was listed as 5 feet 10 inches (1.78 m) tall and 175 pounds (79 kg) and signed with the Cubs in 1956 after graduating from Granite Falls High School in Granite Falls, North Carolina.

== Baseball career ==
Curtis joined the Cubs after two stalwart seasons in minor league baseball. In 1959, he won 20 games (losing 10) with a sparkling 2.84 earned run average for the Class B Wenatchee Chiefs. Then, in 1960, he went 19–8 (3.57 ERA) with a league-leading 19 complete games for the Double-A San Antonio Missions and was named the Texas League's pitcher of the year.

In his rookie campaign, 1961, Curtis took a turn in the Cubs' starting rotation and won 10 games, tied for second on the team, against 13 losses with a 4.89 ERA. He threw six complete games. When future Hall-of-Famer Warren Spahn notched his 300th win on August 11, it was Curtis who took the 2–1 loss. Curtis was a batting practice pitcher for the National League in the All-Star Game and finished third in the1961 NL Rookie of Year voting, trailing his teammate and future Hall-of-Famer Billy Williams and future Hall-of-Fame manager Joe Torre.

In 1962, Curtis began the year going winless in three starts and one relief appearance. On April 30, Curtis was traded even-up for veteran Braves' starting pitcher Bob Buhl, a former National League All-Star. Curtis made only five starts for Milwaukee through the end of 1962 and put up a 4–4 record in 30 games, with one save. At the end of the season, he was traded again, this time to the Cleveland Indians, who had just hired manager Birdie Tebbetts away from the Braves. Curtis appeared in four games for Tebbetts in relief in the early weeks of 1963 and was treated harshly in three of them. He was sent to Triple-A Jacksonville at the May cutdown after allowing ten earned runs in only five innings pitched.

Curtis bounced around the minors the next four seasons, appearing in 52 games, starting seven for Cleveland's Triple-A Portland team in 1964, then spending the next two seasons pitching for Triple-A Toledo in the New York Yankees organization. In 1965, he had a particularly good season, going 10-7 in 17 starts, with a 2.90 ERA, 12 complete games and five shutouts. He began the 1967 season pitching for the Yankees Triple-A team in Syracuse, before finishing his baseball career with seven games for the Minnesota's Triple-A Charlotte affiliate.

During his MLB career, Curtis compiled a career record of 14–19 with a 4.84 earned run average. In 279 innings pitched, he permitted 328 hits and 89 bases on balls with 108 strikeouts. He was credited with six complete games and two saves. He won an additional 97 games in the minors.

== Later life and death ==
Curtis worked in private business after retiring, then spent 25 years as a production manager for a manufacturing company. He was inducted into the Caldwell County Sports Hall of Fame in 1993.

Curtis died on May 12, 2025, at the age of 88.
