= Joe Koppe =

American baseball player (1930–2006)

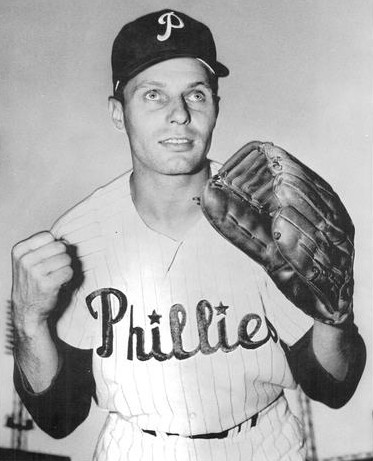
- Koppe in 1961
- Shortstop
- Born: October 19, 1930; Detroit, Michigan, U.S.
- Died: September 27, 2006 (aged 75); Ann Arbor, Michigan, U.S.
- Batted: Right Threw: Right

MLB debut
- August 9, 1958, for the Milwaukee Braves

Last MLB appearance
- September 10, 1965, for the California Angels

MLB statistics
- Batting average: .236
- Home runs: 19
- Runs batted in: 141
- Stats at Baseball Reference

Teams
- Milwaukee Braves (1958); Philadelphia Phillies (1959–1961); Los Angeles / California Angels (1961–1965)

Career highlights and awards
- 1959 Topps All-Star Rookie Team

Joseph Koppe (October 19, 1930 – September 27, 2006), born Joseph Kopchia, was an American professional baseball shortstop, who played in Major League Baseball (MLB) for the Milwaukee Braves, Philadelphia Phillies, and Los Angeles Angels.

== Career ==
Koppe made his big league debut on August 9, 1958, for the Braves. He appeared in 16 games for Milwaukee in the later part of the season, but did not make an appearance when the Braves won the National League pennant and went to the World Series. Just prior to the 1959 season, Koppe was traded to the Phillies as part of a six-player deal.

Koppe came into his own in his first season in Philadelphia. He saw action in 126 games (113 at shortstop), in his true rookie season. Koppe put up a respectable offensive season, hitting .261, with 18 doubles, seven triples, and seven home runs, while scoring 68 runs. His seven triples placed 8th in the National League (NL).

Koppe injured his wrist in 1960 and missed all but 58 games. He played just 9 more games with the Phillies in 1961 and was traded to the Los Angeles Dodgers, who traded him again, just 12 days later, to the St. Louis Cardinals in May 1961. Koppe saw no playing time for the Cardinals and did not see any MLB action for a full month. He was purchased by the Angels on June 19, 1961.

As an Angel, Koppe made a serious effort to return to the performance level of his rookie season. He never saw more than 375 at-bats in any season for the Angels and finished his career with the team a .236 hitter. Koppe was primarily a middle infielder, however, and was always able to contribute defensively.

== Death ==
Koppe died on September 27, 2006, in Ann Arbor, Michigan, after a seven-year battle with cancer.
