= Tony Taylor (baseball) =

Cuban baseball player (1935–2020)

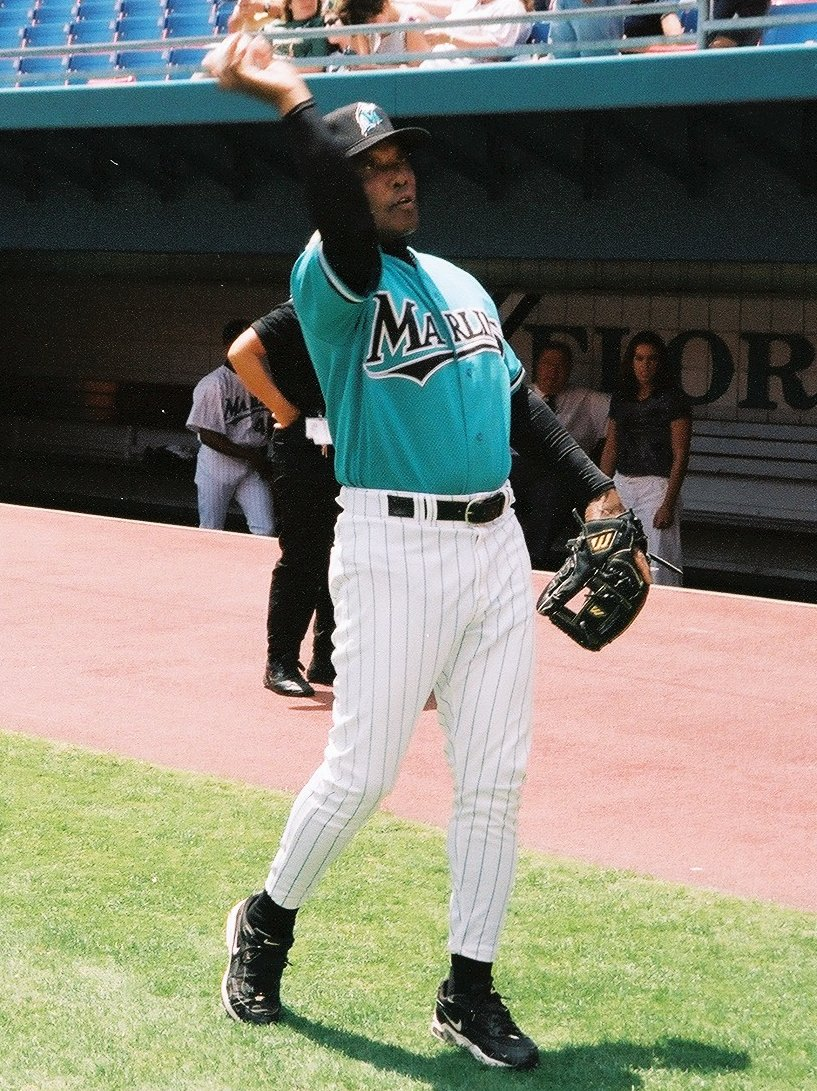
- Taylor with the Florida Marlins in 2001
- Second baseman
- Born: December 19, 1935; Central Álava, Cuba
- Died: July 16, 2020 (aged 84); Miami, Florida, U.S.
- Batted: Right Threw: Right

MLB debut
- April 15, 1958, for the Chicago Cubs

Last MLB appearance
- September 29, 1976, for the Philadelphia Phillies

MLB statistics
- Batting average: .261
- Hits: 2,007
- Home runs: 75
- Runs batted in: 598
- Stats at Baseball Reference

Teams
- Chicago Cubs (1958–1960); Philadelphia Phillies (1960–1971); Detroit Tigers (1971–1973); Philadelphia Phillies (1974–1976)

Career highlights and awards
- 2× All-Star (1960, 1960²); Philadelphia Phillies Wall of Fame

Antonio Nemesio Taylor Sánchez (December 19, 1935 – July 16, 2020) was a Cuban professional baseball second baseman who played 19 seasons in Major League Baseball (MLB). He played for the Chicago Cubs, Philadelphia Phillies, and Detroit Tigers from 1958 until 1976. He batted and threw right-handed and also played third base and first base.

Taylor was signed as an amateur free agent by the New York Giants in 1954 and played for three of their minor league affiliates until 1957, when the Chicago Cubs drafted him in that year's Rule 5 draft and promoted him to the major leagues. After spending two seasons with the organization, he was traded to the Philadelphia Phillies in 1960, the same year he was selected twice as an All-Star. He was subsequently dealt in mid-1971 to the Detroit Tigers, who released him after two seasons. He returned to the Phillies and played his last game on September 29, 1976.

== Early life ==
Taylor was born in Central Alava, Matanzas Province, on December 19, 1935. He was of American descent through his father, who died in 1957. His mother's parents were Chinese; they changed their name to Sánchez upon arrival in Cuba.

Taylor's younger brother, Jorge, also played baseball with a minor league affiliate of the Cincinnati Reds in 1960. Taylor also had a sister (Estrella). He started playing baseball when he was seven or eight years old. He was signed as an amateur free agent by the New York Giants in April 1954.

== Professional career ==
Taylor posted a career .261 batting average with 75 home runs and 598 RBI in 2195 games.

Taylor signed at age 18 as a third baseman in the New York Giants organization. He debuted in the major leagues with the Chicago Cubs in 1958; he was their starting second baseman in 1958 and 1959.

Taylor had a small role in one of baseball history's weirdest plays. It took place on June 30, 1959, when the St. Louis Cardinals played the Cubs at Wrigley Field. Stan Musial was at the plate facing Bob Anderson with a count of 3–1. Anderson's next pitch was errant, the ball evaded catcher Sammy Taylor and rolled all the way to the backstop. Umpire Vic Delmore called "ball four", but Anderson and Sammy Taylor contended that Musial foul tipped the ball, which would mean the ball was actually strike two. While Delmore was embroiled in an argument with Anderson and Sammy Taylor, Musial ran for second base. Seeing that Musial was running to second, third baseman Alvin Dark retrieved the ball, which briefly wound up in the hands of field announcer Pat Pieper, but Dark recovered it. Absentmindedly, however, Delmore produced a new baseball and gave it to Sammy Taylor. When Anderson saw Musial trying for second, he took the new ball from Sammy Taylor and threw it towards Tony Taylor covering second base, and the ball went over the latter's head into the outfield. Meanwhile, Dark threw the original ball to shortstop Ernie Banks. Musial did not see the throw and he was declared out when the tag was made.

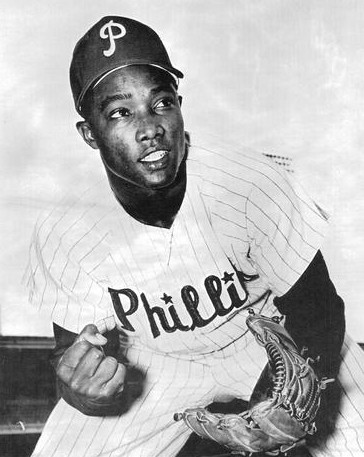
Taylor as a player with the Philadelphia Phillies in 1961

Taylor was traded to the Philadelphia Phillies along with Cal Neeman for Don Cardwell and Ed Bouchee early in the 1960 season. Despite the fact that Philadelphia was a mediocre team, Taylor established himself and was named to the National League All-Star team that year.

A solid and dependable performer, Taylor set a Phillies team record by playing 1,003 games at second base (later broken by Chase Utley), and his six steals of home ranks him second on the Phillies' all-time list.

Taylor appeared on a live satellite broadcast feed on July 23, 1962, in the first live transatlantic broadcast, relayed by Telstar in the 20 minutes that it orbited over the Atlantic Ocean. As lead-in filler before a speech by President John F. Kennedy, a 90-second clip of a game between the Phillies and the Chicago Cubs at Wrigley Field, featuring Taylor hitting a ball pitched by Cal Koonce to right fielder George Altman, was captured and broadcast live to Europe.

In 1963, Taylor hit .281 and collected career highs in runs (102) and hits (182), and the next season, he made the defensive play that saved Jim Bunning's perfect game. In 1970, he hit a career-high .301 average with 26 doubles, nine triples and nine homers.

Taylor was dealt from the Phillies to the Detroit Tigers for minor-league right-handed pitchers Carl Cavanaugh and Mike Fremuth on June 11, 1971. He helped them to a division title a year later. A free agent before the 1974 season, he signed again with the Phillies and became a valuable utility man and pinch hitter for his final three major league seasons.

== Later life ==
After retiring as a player, Taylor became a major league coach for the Phillies from 1977 to 1979, and again from 1988 to 1989. In the intervening time, he was manager in the organization's minor league system and a roving instructor. He served as a minor league coach with the Giants starting in 1990. Two years later, he became minor league coordinator of the Florida Marlins, before becoming their major league coach from 1999 to 2001, and again in 2004.

Taylor was enshrined in the Cuban Baseball Hall of Fame in 1981. He was subsequently inducted into the Philadelphia Phillies Wall of Fame in 2002, and the Hispanic Heritage Baseball Museum Hall of Fame two years later.

Taylor died on July 16, 2020, at the age of 84. He had suffered a stroke one year before at the conclusion of an event for retired players at Citizens Bank Park, and died due to complications arising from it.

== See also ==
- 1972 American League Championship Series
- List of Major League Baseball career hits leaders
- List of Major League Baseball career stolen bases leaders
- List of Major League Baseball players from Cuba
- List of Major League Baseball career runs scored leaders
- List of Major League Baseball ultimate grand slams
