= 1977 Baseball Hall of Fame balloting =

Elections to the Baseball Hall of Fame

National Baseball

Hall of Fame and Museum
- New inductees: 6
- via BBWAA: 1
- via Veterans Committee: 3
- via Negro Leagues Committee: 2
- Total inductees: 163
- Induction date: August 8, 1977

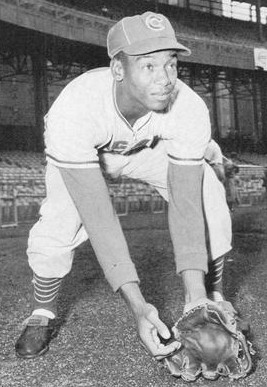
1977 BBWAA inductee Ernie Banks

Elections to the Baseball Hall of Fame for 1977 followed the system in place since 1971. The Baseball Writers' Association of America (BBWAA) voted by mail to select from recent major league players and elected Ernie Banks. The Veterans Committee met in closed sessions to consider executives, managers, umpires, and earlier major league players. It selected three people: Al López, Amos Rusie, and Joe Sewell. The Negro League Committee also met in person and selected two players, Martín Dihigo and John Henry Lloyd. The Negro League Committee also decided to disband; it had elected nine players in seven years. A formal induction ceremony was held in Cooperstown, New York, on August 8, 1977, with Commissioner of Baseball Bowie Kuhn presiding.

== BBWAA election ==
The BBWAA was authorized to elect players active in 1957 or later, but not after 1971; the ballot included candidates from the 1976 ballot who were not elected, along with selected players, chosen by a screening committee, whose last appearance was in 1971. All 10-year members of the BBWAA were eligible to vote.

Voters were instructed to cast votes for up to 10 candidates; any candidate receiving votes on at least 75% of the ballots would be honored with induction to the Hall. The ballot consisted of 34 players; a total of 383 ballots were cast, with 288 votes required for election. A total of 2,929 individual votes were cast, an average of 7.65 per ballot.

Candidates who were eligible for the first time are indicated here with a dagger (†). The one candidate who received at least 75% of the vote and was elected is indicated in bold italics; candidates who have since been elected in subsequent elections are indicated in italics.

George Kell and Walker Cooper were on the ballot for the final time. Harvey Kuenn, whose last game had been in 1966, was eligible for the first time due to his appearance on the roster of the Milwaukee Brewers for two weeks in 1970.

| Player | Votes | Percent | Change |
|---|---|---|---|
| **Ernie Banks**† | 321 | 83.8 | - |
| Eddie Mathews | 239 | 62.4 | ▲13.7% |
| Gil Hodges | 224 | 58.5 | ▼1.6% |
| Enos Slaughter | 222 | 58.0 | ▲7.2% |
| Duke Snider | 212 | 55.4 | ▲14.4% |
| Don Drysdale | 197 | 51.4 | ▲22.0% |
| Pee Wee Reese | 163 | 42.6 | ▼5.3% |
| Nellie Fox | 152 | 39.7 | ▼5.1% |
| Jim Bunning† | 146 | 38.1 | - |
| George Kell | 141 | 36.8 | ▲3.6% |
| Richie Ashburn | 139 | 36.3 | ▲14.4% |
| Red Schoendienst | 105 | 27.4 | ▼5.8% |
| Lew Burdette | 85 | 22.2 | ▲16.8% |
| Roger Maris | 72 | 18.8 | ▼3.6% |
| Alvin Dark | 66 | 17.2 | ▲1.2% |
| Harvey Kuenn† | 57 | 14.9 | - |
| Ted Kluszewski | 55 | 14.4 | ▲1.5% |
| Mickey Vernon | 52 | 13.6 | ▲0.2% |
| Walker Cooper | 45 | 11.7 | ▼2.7% |
| Elston Howard | 43 | 11.2 | ▼3.0% |
| Don Newcombe | 43 | 11.2 | ▲5.8% |
| Don Larsen | 39 | 10.2 | ▼1.9% |
| Roy Face | 33 | 8.6 | ▲2.7% |
| Curt Flood† | 16 | 4.2 | - |
| Ken Boyer | 14 | 3.7 | ▼0.2% |
| Bobby Thomson | 10 | 2.6 | ▲0.3% |
| Del Crandall | 8 | 2.1 | ▼1.8% |
| Harvey Haddix | 7 | 1.8 | ▼0.3% |
| Vern Law | 5 | 1.3 | ▼1.0% |
| Dick Groat | 4 | 1.0 | ▼0.8% |
| Vic Wertz | 4 | 1.0 | ▼0.3% |
| Bill White | 4 | 1.0 | ▼0.8% |
| Camilo Pascual† | 3 | 0.8 | - |
| Johnny Podres | 3 | 0.8 | ▲0.3% |

Key to colors
| Elected to the Hall. These individuals are also indicated in **bold italics**. |
| Players who were elected in future elections. These individuals are also indicated in plain italics. |
| Players not yet elected who returned on the 1978 ballot. |
| Eliminated from future BBWAA voting. These individuals remain eligible for future Veterans Committee consideration. |

Harvey Kuenn, whose last game played was in 1966, was actually activated by the Brewers for the last two weeks of 1971, in order for him to qualify for pension purposes. He did not play in an actual game, however.

The newly-eligible players included 13 All-Stars, 8 of whom were not included on the ballot, representing a total of 50 All-Star selections. Among the new candidates were 11-time All-Star Ernie Banks, 8-time All-Star Harvey Kuenn, and 7-time All-Stars Jim Bunning and Camilo Pascual. The field included two MVPs (Banks, who won twice, and Zoilo Versalles), one Cy Young Award winner (Dean Chance) and one Rookie of the Year (Kuenn).

Players eligible for the first time who were not included on the ballot were: Bob Aspromonte, Clete Boyer, George Brunet, Dean Chance, Ty Cline, Clay Dalrymple, Dick Ellsworth, Jake Gibbs, Tony González, Mudcat Grant, Dick Hall, Jim Hannan, Mike Hershberger, Chuck Hinton, Mack Jones, Cal Koonce, Jim Maloney, Lee Maye, Mike McCormick, Don Pavletich, Claude Raymond, Howie Reed, Ducky Schofield, Al Spangler, George Thomas, Zoilo Versalles and Al Weis.

== J. G. Taylor Spink Award ==
Harold Kaese (1909–1975) and Red Smith (1905–1982) received the J. G. Taylor Spink Award honoring baseball writers. The awards were voted at the December 1976 meeting of the BBWAA, and included in the summer 1977 ceremonies.
