= Sammy Taylor (baseball) =

American baseball player (1933–2019)

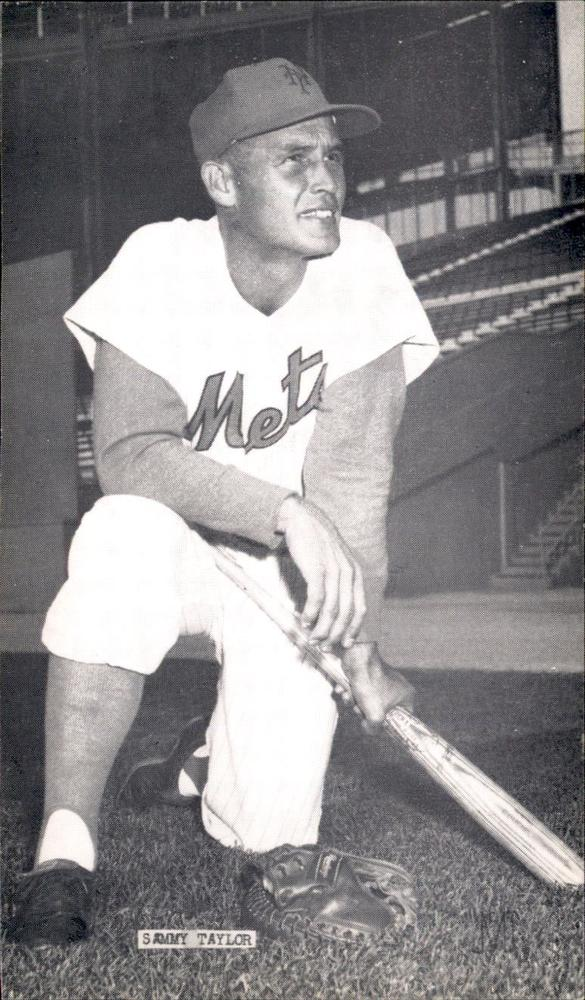
- Taylor with the New York Mets in 1962
- Catcher
- Born: February 27, 1933; Woodruff, South Carolina, U.S.
- Died: October 8, 2019 (aged 86); Woodruff, South Carolina, U.S.
- Batted: Left Threw: Right

MLB debut
- April 20, 1958, for the Chicago Cubs

Last MLB appearance
- August 6, 1963, for the Cleveland Indians

MLB statistics
- Batting average: .245
- Home runs: 33
- Runs batted in: 147
- Stats at Baseball Reference

Teams
- Chicago Cubs (1958–1962); New York Mets (1962–1963); Cincinnati Reds (1963); Cleveland Indians (1963)

Samuel Douglas Taylor (February 27, 1933 – October 8, 2019) was an American professional baseball player, a Major League catcher who appeared in 473 games over six seasons from 1958 to 1963 for the Chicago Cubs, New York Mets, Cincinnati Reds and Cleveland Indians. Born in Woodruff, South Carolina, he left-handed-batting Taylor was listed as 6 feet 2 inches (1.88 m) tall and 185 pounds (84 kg).

After graduating from Woodruff High School, Taylor played one season (1950) in the Class D North Carolina State League. Then, he served in the United States Navy during the Korean Conflict.

== Baseball career ==
=== Chicago Cubs ===
Signed by the Milwaukee Braves as a 23-year-old free agent in 1956, Taylor spent two full years in the Braves' farm system, then was traded with pitcher Taylor Phillips to the Cubs for outfielder Eddie Haas and pitchers Don Kaiser and Bob Rush on December 5, 1957. He made his big league debut on April 20, 1958 against the St. Louis Cardinals. Appearing as a pinch hitter for Gene Fodge, he drew a walk in his first plate appearance. Overall, Taylor appeared in 96 games in 1958, hitting .259 with 78 hits, six home runs and 36 RBI.

In 110 games in 1959, Taylor hit .269 with 13 home runs and 43 runs batted in in 110 games. His 13 intentional walks were the fourth most that season. Taylor was involved in a rather peculiar situation in a game on June 30 of that year, between the St. Louis Cardinals and Chicago Cubs. Stan Musial was at the plate, with a count of 3–1. Pitcher Bob Anderson's next pitch was errant, evading Taylor and rolling all the way to the backstop. Umpire Vic Delmore called ball four, however Anderson and Taylor contended that Musial foul tipped the ball. Because the ball was still in play, and because Delmore was embroiled in an argument with the catcher and pitcher, Musial took it upon himself to try for second base. Seeing that Musial was trying for second, Alvin Dark ran to the backstop to retrieve the ball. The ball wound up in the hands of field announcer Pat Pieper, but Dark ended up getting it back anyway. Absentmindedly, however, Delmore pulled out a new ball and gave it to Taylor. Anderson finally noticed that Musial was trying for second, took the new ball, and threw it to second baseman Tony Taylor. To Anderson's disappointment, the ball flew over Tony Taylor's head into the outfield. Dark, at the same time that Anderson threw the new ball, threw the original ball to shortstop Ernie Banks. Musial, though, did not see Dark's throw and only noticed Anderson's ball fly over the second baseman's head, so he tried to go to third base. On his way there, he was tagged by Banks, and after a delay he was ruled out.

Taylor slumped in 1960, hitting only .207 in 150 at-bats. He lost his starting catching role that year and played in only 74 games.

Taylor was the team's second most used catcher in 1961, behind Dick Bertell. In 1961, he hit .238 with eight home runs and 23 RBI in 235 at-bats (89 games).

=== New York Mets ===
Taylor began the 1962 season with the Cubs, hitting .133 in 15 at-bats with them. On April 26, he was traded to the Mets for outfielder Bobby Gene Smith. In 68 games with the Mets, he hit .222 with three home runs and 20 RBI. Overall, he hit .214 in 173 at-bats that season.

In 1963—his final season—Taylor played for three different teams. He began the year with the Mets and hit .257 in 41 at-bats with them.

=== Cincinnati Reds and Cleveland Indians ===
On July 1, he was traded with Charlie Neal to the Reds for another catcher, Jesse Gonder. He played in three games for the Reds, collecting no hits in six at-bats. On August 1, he was traded to the Indians for outfielder/catcher Gene Green. He amassed three hits in ten at-bats for the Indians. Overall, he hit .235 with no home runs and seven RBI in 51 at-bats. He played his final game on August 6.

Overall, Taylor played six years in the majors, hitting .245 with 309 hits, 47 doubles, nine triples, 33 home runs and 147 RBI in 473 games.

Sammy Taylor died October 8, 2019, aged 86.
