= Ernie Banks =

American baseball player (1931–2015)

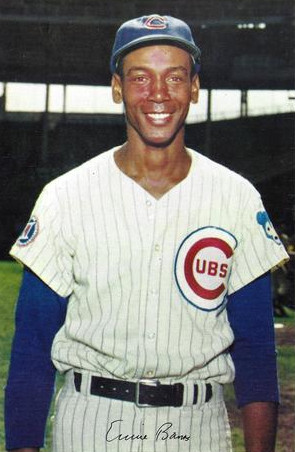
- Banks in 1969
- Shortstop / First baseman
- Born: January 31, 1931; Dallas, Texas, U.S.
- Died: January 23, 2015 (aged 83); Chicago, Illinois, U.S.
- Batted: Right Threw: Right

MLB debut
- September 17, 1953, for the Chicago Cubs

Last MLB appearance
- September 26, 1971, for the Chicago Cubs

MLB statistics
- Batting average: .274
- Hits: 2,583
- Home runs: 512
- Runs batted in: 1,636
- Stats at Baseball Reference

Teams
- As player: Chicago Cubs (1953–1971); As coach: Chicago Cubs (1967–1973)

Career highlights and awards
- 14× All-Star (1955–1960², 1961²–1962², 1965, 1967, 1969); 2× NL MVP (1958, 1959); Gold Glove Award (1960); 2× NL home run leader (1958, 1960); 2× NL RBI leader (1958, 1959); Chicago Cubs No. 14 retired; Chicago Cubs Hall of Fame; Major League Baseball All-Century Team

Member of the National

Baseball Hall of Fame
- Induction: 1977
- Vote: 83.8% (first ballot)
Military career
Allegiance	United States
Branch	United States Army
Service years	1951–1953
Rank	Private first class

Ernest Banks (January 31, 1931 – January 23, 2015), nicknamed "Mr. Cub" and "Mr. Sunshine", was an American professional baseball player who starred in Major League Baseball (MLB) as a shortstop and first baseman for the Chicago Cubs between 1953 and 1971. He was inducted into the National Baseball Hall of Fame in 1977 in his first year of eligibility, and was named to the Major League Baseball All-Century Team in 1999.

Banks is regarded as one of the greatest players of all time. He began playing professional baseball in 1950 with the Kansas City Monarchs in the Negro leagues. He served in the U.S. military for two years, played for the Monarchs again, and began his National League career in September 1953. The following year, Banks was the National League Rookie of the Year runner-up. Beginning in 1955, Banks was a National League (NL) All-Star for 11 seasons, playing in 13 of the 15 All-Star Games held during those years. Banks was the Cubs' main attraction in the late 1950s, the National League Most Valuable Player in 1958 and 1959, and the Cubs' first Gold Glove winner in 1960.

In 1962, Banks became a regular first baseman for the Cubs. Between 1967 and 1971, he was a player-coach. In 1969, through a Chicago Sun-Times fan poll, Cubs fans voted him the greatest Cub ever. In 1970, Banks hit his 500th career home run at Wrigley Field. He retired from playing in 1971, was a coach for the Cubs in 1972, and in 1982 was the team's first player to have his uniform number retired.

Banks was active in the Chicago community during and after his tenure with the Cubs. He founded a charitable organization, became the first black Ford Motor Company dealer in the United States, and made an unsuccessful bid for a local political office. In 2013, Banks was awarded the Presidential Medal of Freedom by Barack Obama for his contribution to sports.

== Early life ==
Banks was born in Dallas, Texas, to Eddie and Essie Banks on January 31, 1931; he was the second of twelve children. His father, who had worked in construction and was a warehouse loader for a grocery chain, played baseball for black, semi-professional teams in Texas. As a child, Banks was not very interested in baseball, preferring swimming, basketball and football. His father bought him a baseball glove for less than three dollars at a five and dime store and motivated him with nickels and dimes to play catch. While still in high school, Banks joined the Dallas Black Giants, a semi-pro baseball team, in 1949. His mother encouraged him to follow one of his grandfathers into a career as a minister.

Banks graduated from Booker T. Washington High School in 1950. He lettered in basketball, football and track. Banks' school did not have a baseball team; he played fastpitch softball for a church team during the summer. He was also a member of the Amarillo Colts, a semi-professional baseball team. History professor Timothy Gilfoyle wrote that Banks' talent for baseball was discovered by Bill Blair, a family friend who scouted for the Kansas City Monarchs of the Negro American League. Other sources say Banks was noticed by Cool Papa Bell of the Monarchs.

In 1951, Banks was drafted into the U.S. Army and served in Germany during the Korean War. He served as a flag bearer in the 45th Anti-Aircraft Artillery Battalion at Fort Bliss, where he played with the Harlem Globetrotters on a part-time basis. In 1953, he was discharged from the army and joined the Monarchs for the remainder of that season, achieving a .347 batting average. Banks later said, "Playing for the Kansas City Monarchs was like my school, my learning, my world. It was my whole life." Banks hosted a program on 1450 WHFC in the late 1950s.

== MLB career ==
=== Early career ===
Banks signed with the Chicago Cubs in late 1953, making his major league debut on September 17 at age 22 and playing in 10 games at Wrigley Field. He was the Cubs' first black player; he became one of several former Negro league players who joined MLB teams without playing in the minor leagues. Larry Moffi and Jonathan Kronstadt wrote that he "just was not the crusading type. He was so grateful to be playing baseball for a living, he did not have time to change the world, and if that meant some people called him an Uncle Tom, well, so be it."

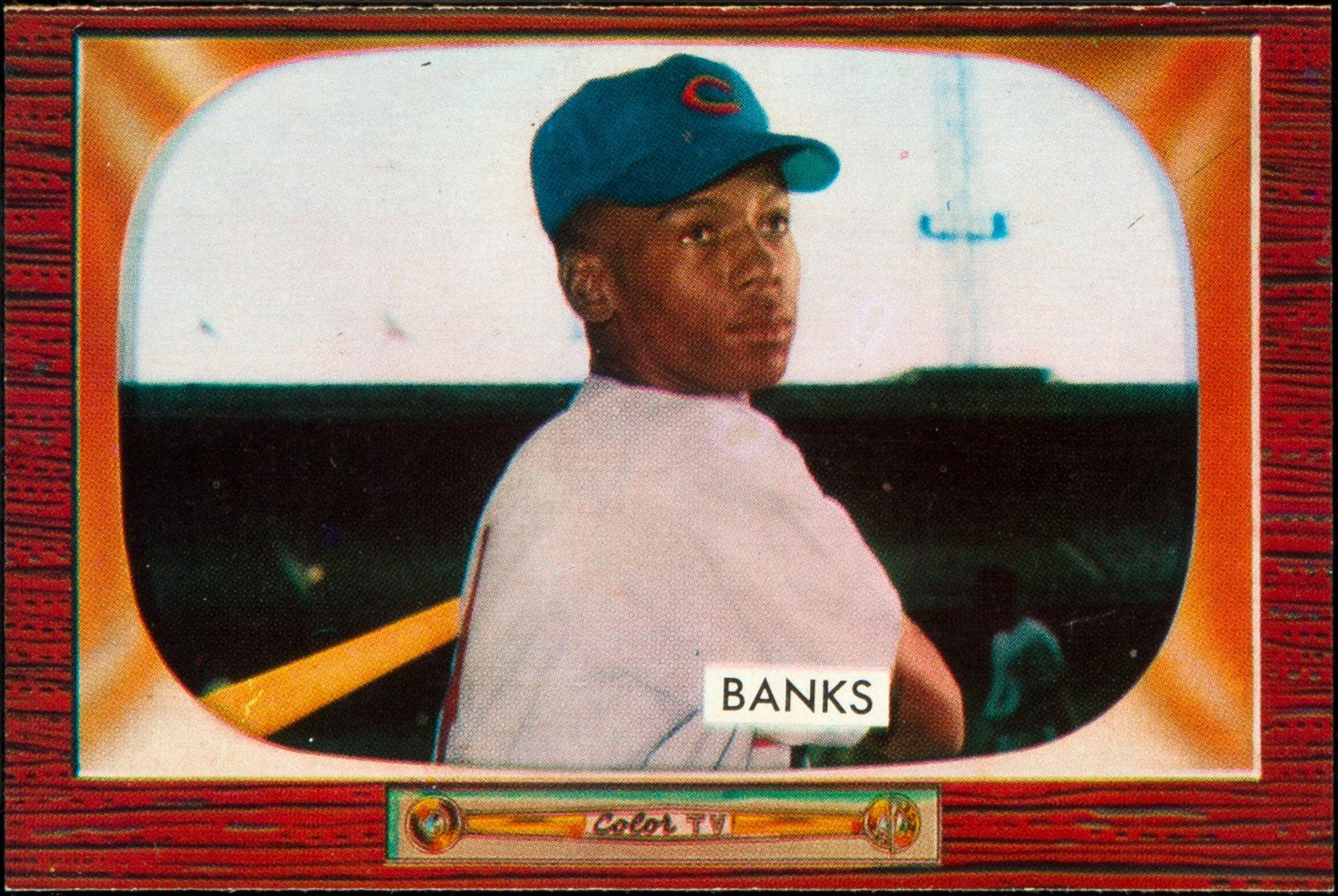
1955 Bowman trading card

During his first game for the Cubs, Banks received a visit from Jackie Robinson that influenced his quiet presence in baseball. Robinson told Banks, "Ernie, I'm glad to see you're up here so now just listen and learn ... For years, I didn't talk and learned a lot about people". Later, when Banks felt like becoming more vocal, he discussed the issue with teammate Billy Williams, who advised him to remain quiet. Williams drew the analogy of fish that are caught once they open their mouths. Banks said, "I kept my mouth shut but tried to make a difference. My whole life, I've just wanted to make people better".

In 1954, Banks' double play partner during his official rookie season was Gene Baker, the Cubs' second black player. Banks and Baker roomed together on road trips and became the first all-black double-play combination in major league history. When Steve Bilko played first base, Cubs announcer Bert Wilson referred to the Banks–Baker–Bilko double play combination as "Bingo to Bango to Bilko". Banks hit 19 home runs and finished second to Wally Moon in Rookie of the Year voting. Banks participated in a trend toward lighter baseball bats after he accidentally picked up a teammate's bat and liked that it was easy to generate bat speed.

In 1955, Banks hit 44 home runs, had 117 RBI and batted .295. He played and was the starting NL shortstop in his first of 13 All-Star Games that season. His home run total was a single-season record among shortstops. He also set a 30-year record of five single-season grand slam home runs. Banks finished third in 1955 in the league's Most Valuable Player (MVP) voting, behind Roy Campanella and Duke Snider. The Cubs finished with a 72–81 win–loss record, winning 29 of 77 road games. In 1956, Banks missed 18 games due to a hand infection, breaking his run of 424 consecutive games played. He finished the season with 28 home runs, 85 RBIs, and a .297 batting average. He made the All-Star selection as a reserve player but did not play in the game. In 1957, Banks finished the season with 43 home runs, 102 RBI, and a .285 batting average.

In 1958 and 1959, Banks became the first NL player to be awarded back-to-back MVP Awards, leading the league in RBI in both those seasons (with 129 and 143, respectively). His 1958 season was also the first time an MVP winner was on a below-.500 team. Banks hit a major-league-leading (and a career best) 47 home runs in 1958, while batting .313, third best in the NL. The following year, he hit .304 with 45 home runs. In 1959, the Cubs came the closest to a winning season since Banks' arrival, finishing with a 74–80 record.

Banks had a small role in an unusual play on June 30, 1959, when the St. Louis Cardinals played the Cubs at Wrigley Field. Stan Musial was at the plate facing Bob Anderson with a count of 3–1. Anderson's next pitch was errant, the ball evaded catcher Sammy Taylor and rolled all the way to the backstop. Umpire Vic Delmore called "ball four", but Anderson and Taylor contended that Musial foul tipped the ball. Because the ball was still in play and Delmore was embroiled in an argument with Anderson and Taylor, Musial tried to run for second base. Seeing that Musial was running to second, third baseman Alvin Dark ran to the backstop to retrieve the ball. The ball wound up in the hands of field announcer Pat Pieper, but Dark ended up getting it back anyway. Absentmindedly, however, Delmore pulled out a new baseball and gave it to Taylor. When Anderson noticed that Musial was trying for second, he took the new ball from Sammy Taylor and threw it towards Tony Taylor covering second base, and the ball went over Taylor's head into the outfield. At the same time that Anderson threw the new ball towards second baseman Taylor, Dark threw the original ball to shortstop Ernie Banks. Musial did not see the throw and he was declared out when the tag was made.

In 1960, Banks hit a major league and NL-leading 41 HR, had 117 RBI, and led the NL in games played for the sixth time in seven years. He was also the first Cubs player to receive an annual NL Gold Glove award (for shortstop). On the eve of the 1960 World Series, Joe Reichler, a writer for the Associated Press, reported that the Milwaukee Braves were prepared to pay cash and trade pitchers Joey Jay, Carlton Willey and Don Nottebart, outfielder Billy Bruton, shortstop Johnny Logan and first baseman Frank Torre in exchange for Banks from the Cubs.

=== Move to first base ===
In 1961, Banks experienced problems with a knee injury he had suffered while in the army. After 717 consecutive games, he removed himself from the Cubs lineup for at least four games, ending his pursuit of the record for playing in the most consecutive NL games of 895 games set by Stan Musial. In May, the Cubs announced that Jerry Kindall would replace Banks at shortstop and that Banks would move to left field. Banks later said, "Only a duck out of water could have shared my loneliness in left field". Banks credited center fielder Richie Ashburn with helping him learn to play left field; in 23 games Banks committed only one error. In June, he was moved to first base, learning that position from former first baseman and Cubs coach Charlie Grimm. He was not selected to be an All-Star for the first of two All-Star games that season since 1959, when MLB started having two All-Star Games per season through 1962, (Note: Major League Baseball held two All-Star Games for the years from 1959 to 1962.) but was selected as a reserve player. Banks was a pinch hitter in the second All-Star game.

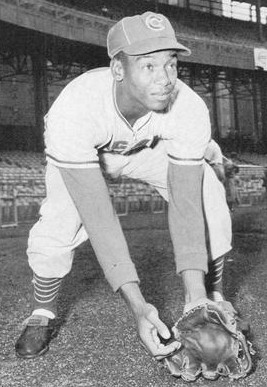
Banks in 1964

The Cubs began playing under the College of Coaches in 1961, a system in which decisions were made by a group of 12 coaches rather than by one manager. By the 1962 season, Banks hoped to return to shortstop but the College of Coaches had determined that he would remain at first base indefinitely. In May 1962, Banks was hit in the head by a fastball from former Cubs pitcher Moe Drabowsky and was taken off the field unconscious. He sustained a concussion, spent two nights in a hospital, sat out a Monday game, and hit three home runs and a double on Tuesday.

In May 1963, Banks set a single-game record of 22 putouts by a first baseman. However, he caught mumps that year and finished the season with 18 home runs, 64 RBI, and a .227 batting average. Despite Banks' struggles that season, the Cubs had their first winning record since the 1940s. Banks, following his doctor's orders, avoided his usual off-season participation in handball and basketball, and began the 1964 season weighing seven pounds (3.2 kg) more than the previous year. Banks finished the season with 23 home runs, 95 RBI, and a .264 batting average. The Cubs finished in eighth place in 1964, losing over $315,000. In 1965, Banks hit 28 home runs, had 107 RBI, a .265 batting average, and played and started at first base in the All-Star Game. On September 2, he hit his 400th home run. The Cubs finished the season with a baseball operations deficit of $1.2 million, though this was largely offset by television and radio revenue, and the rental of Wrigley Field to the Chicago Bears football team.

The Cubs hired Leo Durocher as manager in 1966, hoping he could inspire renewed interest in the team's fan base. Banks hit only 15 home runs; Cubs finished the 1966 season in last place with a 59–103 win–loss record, the worst season of Durocher's career. From the time Durocher arrived in Chicago, he was frustrated at his inability to trade or bench the aging Banks. In Durocher's autobiography, he says:

... [Banks] was a great player in his time. Unfortunately, his time wasn't my time. Even more unfortunately, there was not a thing I could do about it. He couldn't run, he couldn't field; toward the end, he couldn't even hit. There are some players who instinctively do the right thing on the base paths. Ernie had an unfailing instinct for doing the wrong thing. But I had to play him. Had to play the man or there would have been a revolution in the street."

Banks said of Durocher, "I wish there had been someone around like him early in my career ... He's made me go for that little extra needed to win". Durocher served as Cubs manager until mid-1972, the season after Banks retired. In his memoir Mr. Cub, published around the time that Banks retired, Banks said too much had been made of the racial implications in his relationship with Durocher:

My philosophy about race relations is that I'm the man and I'll set my own patterns in life. I don't rely on anyone else's opinions. I look at a man as a human being; I don't care about his color. Some people feel that because you are black you will never be treated fairly, and that you should voice your opinions, be militant about them. I don't feel this way. You can't convince a fool against his will ... If a man doesn't like me because I'm black, that's fine. I'll just go elsewhere, but I'm not going to let him change my life.

The Cubs appointed Banks a player-coach for the 1967 season. Banks competed with John Boccabella for a starting position at first base. Shortly after, Durocher named Banks the outright starter at first base. Banks hit 23 home runs and drove in 95 runs, and went to the All-Star Game that year. After the 1967 season, an article in Ebony said Banks was not thought to have made more than $65,000 (equal to $627,620 today) in any season. He had received a pay increase from $33,000 to $50,000 between his MVP seasons in 1958 and 1959, but Ebony said several MLB players were making $100,000 at the time.

=== Final seasons ===
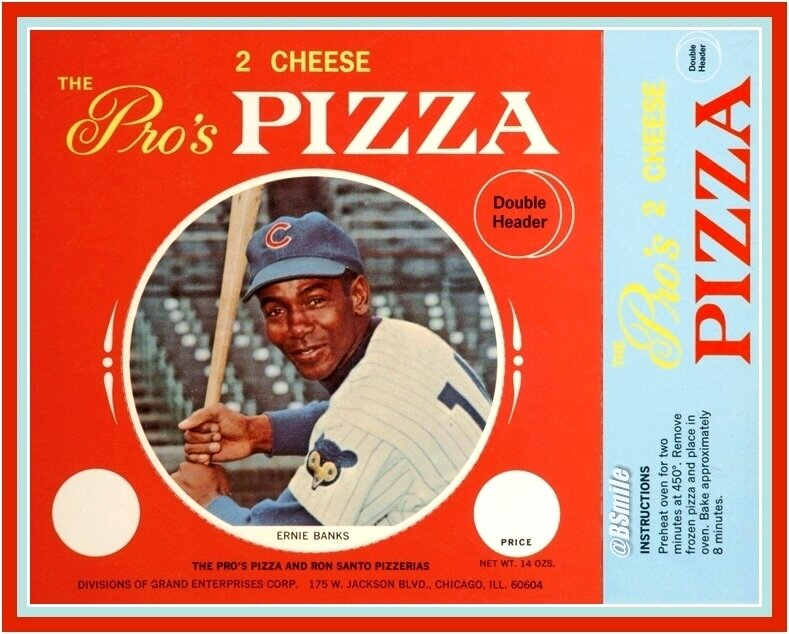
1967 food packaging

Banks won the Lou Gehrig Memorial Award in 1968, an honor recognizing playing ability and personal character. The 37-year-old Banks hit 32 home runs, had 83 RBI, and finished that season with a .246 batting average. In 1969, he came the closest to helping the Cubs win the NL pennant; the Cubs fell from first place after holding an 8 1/2-game lead in August. Banks made his 11th and final All-Star season appearance as a pinch hitter; it was his 14th All-Star Game appearance overall. Banks hit his 500th home run on May 12, 1970, at Chicago's Wrigley Field. On December 1, 1971, Banks retired as a player but continued to coach for the Cubs until 1973. He was an instructor in the minor leagues for the next three seasons and also worked in the Cubs' front office.

Banks finished his career with 512 home runs; his 277 home runs as a shortstop were a career record at the time of his retirement. (Cal Ripken Jr. now holds the record for most home runs as a shortstop with 345.) Banks holds Cubs records for games played (2,528), at-bats (9,421), extra-base hits (1,009) and total bases (4,706). Banks also excelled as an infielder; he won an NL Gold Glove Award for shortstop in 1960. He led the NL in putouts five times and was the NL leader in fielding percentage as shortstop three times, and once as first baseman.

Banks holds the major league record for most games played without a postseason appearance (2,528). In his memoir, citing his fondness for the Cubs and owner Philip K. Wrigley, Banks said he did not regret signing with the Cubs rather than one of the more successful baseball franchises. Banks' popularity and positive attitude led to the nicknames "Mr. Cub" and "Mr. Sunshine". Banks was known for his catchphrase, "It's a beautiful day for a ballgame ... Let's play two!", expressing his wish to play a doubleheader every day out of his love of baseball.

== Personal life ==
In 1953, after returning from military service in Germany, Banks married his first wife Mollye Ector. He proposed to her in a letter from Germany. Although he filed for divorce two years later, the couple briefly reconciled in early 1959. By that summer, they agreed on a divorce settlement that would pay $65,000 to Ector in lieu of alimony. Shortly thereafter, Banks eloped with Eloyce Johnson. The couple had twin sons within a year and a daughter four years after that. Ector filed suit against Banks in 1963 for failure to make payments on a life insurance policy agreed upon in their divorce settlement.

Banks was a lifelong Republican – and he also once stated that "I'm not goin' anywhere I'm not wanted" – prompting critics to claim that he was "soft" on Jim Crow; he ran for alderman in Chicago in 1963. He ran in the 8th Ward against Democratic incumbent James A. Condon. In the Feb. 26 primary, Banks finished a distant third, garnering just 12% of the vote (Condon won re-election with 55%; Gerald Gibbons drew 25%). He later said, "People knew me only as a baseball player. They didn't think I qualified as a government official and no matter what I did I couldn't change my image ... What I learned, was that it was going to be hard for me to disengage myself from my baseball life and I would have to compensate for it after my playing days were over." Banks endorsed George W. Bush for president in 2004.

In 1966, Banks worked for Seaway National Bank in the off-season and enrolled in a banking correspondence course. He bought into several business ventures, including a gas station, during his playing career. Though he had been paid modestly in comparison to other baseball stars, Banks had taken the advice of Wrigley and invested much of his earnings. He later spent time working for an insurance company and for New World Van Lines. Banks began building assets that would be worth an estimated $4 million by the time he was 55 years old.

Banks and Bob Nelson became the first black owners of a U.S. Ford Motor Company dealership in 1967, Ernie Banks Ford on Chicago's south side. Nelson had been the first non-white commissioned officer in the United States Army Air Forces during World War II; he operated an import car dealership before the venture with Banks. Banks was appointed to the board of directors of the Chicago Transit Authority in 1969. On a trip to Europe, Banks visited the Pope, who presented him with a medal that became a prized possession.

Banks was divorced from Eloyce in 1981. She received several valuable items from his playing career as part of their divorce settlement, including his 500th home run ball. She sold the items not long after the divorce. He remarried in 1984. In 1993, his third wife Marjorie was part of a group that met with MLB executives to discuss race relations in baseball after allegations of racial slurs surfaced against Cincinnati Reds owner Marge Schott. Banks married Liz Ellzey in 1997 and Hank Aaron served as his best man. In late 2008, Banks and Ellzey adopted an infant daughter.

Banks's nephew, Bob Johnson, was a major league catcher and first baseman for the Texas Rangers between 1981 and 1983. His great nephew, Acie Law, is a professional basketball player who attended Texas A&M University before playing in the National Basketball Association (NBA).

== Later years ==
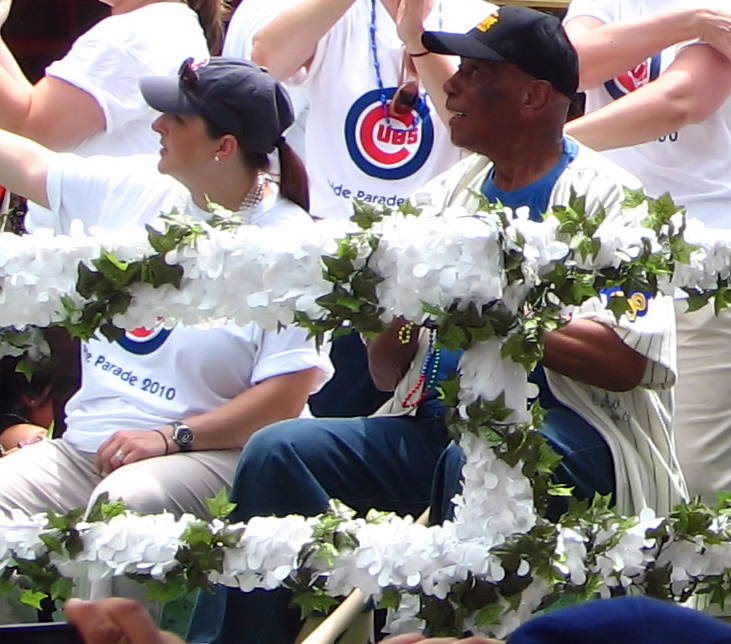
Banks and Cubs co-owner Laura Ricketts on the float representing the Cubs organization at the 2010 Chicago Pride Parade

In 1969, Banks had been appointed to the Chicago Transit Board (the Chicago Transit Authority's governing and administrative body) by the governor of Illinois. He would continue to serve on the board until 1981.

Banks served as a team ambassador after his retirement, though author Phil Rogers says the team had never placed Banks in a position of authority or significant influence. In 1983, shortly after Wrigley sold the team to the Tribune Company, Banks and the Cubs briefly severed ties. Rogers wrote that after the sale, Banks was viewed as "something of a crazy uncle who hung around the house for no apparent reason", and that team officials anonymously told the press that Banks had been fired because he was unreliable. At the time, he was employed as the Cubs' corporate sales representative. Soon Banks and the Cubs reconciled and he resumed making appearances on behalf of the team.

In 1984, when the Cubs won the NL East division, the club named Banks an honorary team member. At the 1990 Major League Baseball All-Star Game, the first one held at Wrigley Field since Banks' playing days, he threw out the ceremonial first pitch to starting catcher Mike Scioscia.

In 2003, he guest starred on an episode of Yes, Dear.

In June 2006, Crain's Chicago Business said Banks was part of a group looking into buying the Chicago Cubs in case the Tribune Company decided to sell the club. Banks established a charity, the Live Above & Beyond Foundation, which assists youth and the elderly with issues including self-esteem and healthcare. In 2008, Banks released a charity wine called Ernie Banks 512 Chardonnay, the proceeds of which were donated to his foundation.

Banks was an ordained minister; he presided at the wedding of MLB pitcher Sean Marshall. On March 31, 2008, a statue of Banks (Mr. Cub) was unveiled in front of Wrigley Field. That year, Eddie Vedder released a song called "All The Way", which Banks had asked Vedder to write about the Cubs as a birthday gift.

Banks remained close to the Cubs team and made frequent appearances at their spring training grounds, HoHoKam Stadium in Arizona. Author Harry Strong wrote in 2013 that "the Chicago Cubs do not have a mascot, but they hardly need one when the face of the franchise is still so visible".

=== Death ===
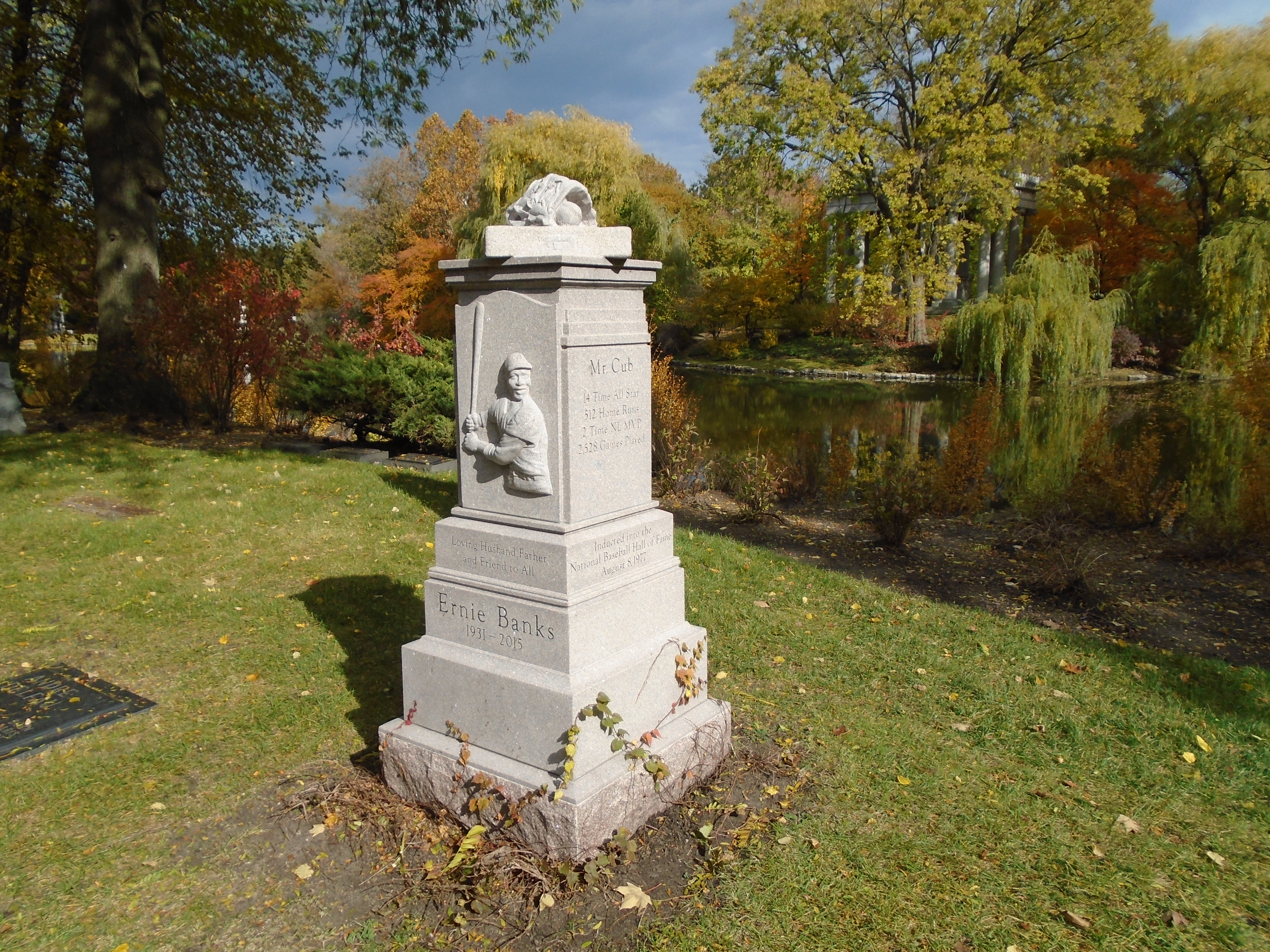
Ernie Banks' grave monument in Graceland Cemetery

Banks died of a heart attack at a Chicago hospital on January 23, 2015, eight days before his 84th birthday. Following a public visitation, a memorial service was held at the Fourth Presbyterian Church. Several well-known people spoke at the service, including Chicago mayor Rahm Emanuel and baseball personalities Joe Torre and Billy Williams. After the service, a procession moved from Downtown Chicago past Wrigley Field.

In the weeks after his death, a legal battle arose over Banks' estate and the disposition of his body. His estranged widow Elizabeth said that he had amended his will in October without her knowledge. The new will left all of Banks' assets to his longtime caregiver, Regina Rice. Banks had been diagnosed with dementia shortly before the change in his will. A Chicago funeral home sent Elizabeth a bill for $35,000 in funeral costs, but the bill went unpaid as Elizabeth challenged the legality of Banks' new will. In March 2015, the Chicago Cubs announced that they would pay the funeral home costs.

Banks was buried in Graceland Cemetery, near Wrigley Field, beneath a monument that pay tribute to his sports and public career. During the entire 2015 season, the Cubs had the number 14 located behind home plate.

== Honors and legacy ==
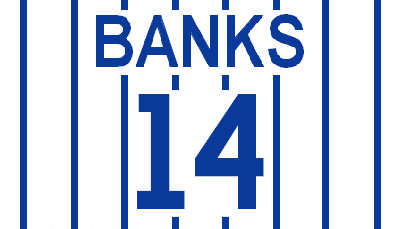
Ernie Banks's number 14 was retired by the Chicago Cubs in 1982.

Banks was voted into the National Baseball Hall of Fame in 1977, his first year of eligibility. He received votes on 321 of the 383 ballots. Though several players were selected through the Veterans Committee and the Special Committee on the Negro Leagues that year, Banks was the only player elected by the Baseball Writers' Association of America. He was inducted on August 8 of that year. Banks ended his induction speech with his famous catchphrase:

We've got the setting – sunshine, fresh air, the team behind us. So let's play two!

The Cubs retired Banks' uniform number 14 in 1982. He was the first player to have his number retired by the team. The team did not retire any more numbers for another five years, when Billy Williams received the honor. Through the 2023 season only six former Cubs, along with Brooklyn Dodger Jackie Robinson, have had their numbers retired by the organization.

External videos
- Presidential Medal of Freedom recipient – Ernie Banks, The White House

Banks was named to the Major League Baseball All-Century Team in 1999. That same year, The Sporting News ranked him number 38 on its list of "Baseball's 100 Greatest Players". In 2020, The Athletic ranked Banks at number 65 on its "Baseball 100" list, complied by sportswriter Joe Posnanski.

In 2022, as part of their SN Rushmore project, The Sporting News named Banks on their "Chicago Mount Rushmore of Sports", along with Chicago Bulls basketball player Michael Jordan, Chicago Bears football player Walter Payton, and Chicago Blackhawks hockey player Bobby Hull.

He was inducted as a Laureate of The Lincoln Academy of Illinois and awarded the Order of Lincoln (the State's highest honor) by the Governor of Illinois in 1970, in the area of Sports.

In 2009, Banks was named a Library of Congress Living Legend, a designation that recognizes those "who have made significant contributions to America's diverse cultural, scientific and social heritage". In 2013, he received the Presidential Medal of Freedom with 15 other people, including Bill Clinton and Oprah Winfrey. During the ceremony, he presented President Obama with a bat that had belonged to Jackie Robinson.

== See also ==
- Major League Baseball consecutive games played streaks
- List of first black Major League Baseball players
- List of baseball players who went directly to Major League Baseball
- List of Negro league baseball players who played in Major League Baseball
- List of Major League Baseball annual runs batted in leaders
- List of Major League Baseball annual home run leaders
- List of Major League Baseball career home run leaders
- List of Major League Baseball career hits leaders
- List of Major League Baseball career doubles leaders
- List of Major League Baseball career runs scored leaders
- List of Major League Baseball career runs batted in leaders
- List of Major League Baseball career total bases leaders
- List of Major League Baseball players who spent their entire career with one franchise
