= Bob Anderson (baseball) =

American baseball player (1935–2015)

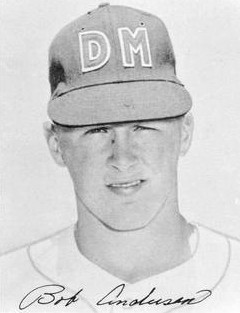
- Anderson with the Des Moines Bruins, circa 1955
- Pitcher
- Born: September 29, 1935; East Chicago, Indiana, U.S.
- Died: March 12, 2015 (aged 79); Tulsa, Oklahoma, U.S.
- Batted: Right Threw: Right

MLB debut
- July 31, 1957, for the Chicago Cubs

Last MLB appearance
- September 25, 1963, for the Detroit Tigers

MLB statistics
- Win–loss record: 36–46
- Earned run average: 4.26
- Strikeouts: 502
- Stats at Baseball Reference

Teams
- Chicago Cubs (1957–1962); Detroit Tigers (1963)

Robert Carl Anderson (September 29, 1935 – March 12, 2015) was an American professional baseball player and right-handed pitcher who appeared in 246 games in Major League Baseball (MLB) between 1957 and 1963 for the Chicago Cubs and Detroit Tigers. Born in East Chicago, Indiana, he graduated from Hammond High School and attended both Michigan State University and Western Michigan University. He stood 6 feet 4 inches (1.93 m) tall and weighed 210 pounds (95 kg) during his active career.

== Career overview ==
Anderson signed with Chicago in 1954 and reached the Open-Classification Pacific Coast League in 1956 as a member of the Cubs' top farm team, the Los Angeles Angels. He had a stellar season as a relief pitcher, working in 70 games and winning a dozen, for the PCL champion Angels. The following year, he was recalled by the Cubs in midyear and spent parts of 1957 and 1958 as a member of the Cubs' bullpen corps and spot starter. In 1959, he made the Cubs' staff for good and became a full-time starting pitcher, posting a 21–24 record over the next two seasons in 66 assignments, with 12 complete games and his only MLB shutout, a 3–0 six-hit triumph against the pennant-contending Milwaukee Braves on August 24, 1959.

In 1961, he transitioned back to a bullpen role, and received only 19 more starting assignments over the rest of his MLB career. He was traded to Detroit after the 1962 season. Reunited with Bob Scheffing, his manager with the PCL Angels and the 1957–1959 Cubs, Anderson got into 32 games for the 1963 Tigers and posted the only winning season of his career, as he captured three of four decisions. He was dealt along with Rocky Colavito and $50,000 from the Tigers to the Kansas City Athletics for Jerry Lumpe, Dave Wickersham and Ed Rakow on November 18, 1963. He did not make the 1964 Athletics' roster and spent the year back in minor league baseball before leaving the game.

During his MLB career, he won 36 games, lost 46, and compiled an earned run average of 4.26. He was credited with 15 complete games. In 8402/3 innings pitched, he allowed 858 hits and 319 bases on balls with 502 strikeouts.

== Involved in unusual 1959 play ==
Anderson was involved in one of Major League Baseball's most unusual and weirdest plays of all time in its long history, which occurred during a game played on June 30, 1959, at Wrigley Field between the Cubs and St. Louis Cardinals.

Anderson was pitching and Stan Musial was at the plate with a count of 3–1. Anderson's next pitch was errant, evading catcher Sammy Taylor and rolling all the way to the backstop. The home plate umpire Vic Delmore called ball four, however Anderson and Taylor contended Musial had foul tipped the ball and because the ball was still in play, and due to Delmore being embroiled in an argument with the catcher and pitcher, Musial took it upon himself to try for second base. Seeing that Musial was breaking for second, Cubs third baseman Alvin Dark ran to the backstop to retrieve the ball, however that ball wound up in the hands of field announcer Pat Pieper, but Dark ended up getting it back anyway.

Absentmindedly, however, Delmore pulled out a new ball and gave it to Taylor. Anderson finally noticed that Musial was trying for second, took the new ball, and threw it to second baseman Tony Taylor at which Anderson's throw flew high over Tony Taylor's head into centerfield. Dark, at the same time that Anderson threw the new ball, threw the original ball to shortstop Ernie Banks. Musial, though, did not see Dark's throw and only noticing Anderson's ball fly over the second baseman's head then tried to go to third base, however, on his way over there, was tagged by Banks, and after a delay was ruled out. Oddly, in the final accounting, this most unusual and different play made no difference in the result, a 4–1 victory for the visiting Cardinals.
