= Vic Delmore =

American baseball umpire (1915-1960)

- Born: October 21, 1915; Dunmore, Pennsylvania, U.S.
- Died: June 10, 1960 (aged 44); Scranton, Pennsylvania, U.S.
- Resting place: Mount Carmel Cemetery (Dunmore, Pennsylvania)
- Occupation: Baseball umpire
- Years active: 1956 – 1959
- Employer: National League
- Height: 6 ft 0 in (1.83 m)

Victor "Deacon" Delmore (October 21, 1915 – June 10, 1960) was an American baseball umpire who worked in the National League from 1956 to 1959. He is perhaps best known for his involvement in an incident during a 1959 game where two baseballs were in play at the same time.

== Career ==
From 1935 to 1942, Delmore pitched in the minor leagues, most notably with the Hopkinsville Hoppers in 1937. His professional umpiring career began in 1948 in the KITTY League. He worked in the Southern Association from 1949 to 1955. Following his promotion to the National League in 1956, he worked a total of 618 games through the 1959 season. During those four seasons, he issued 14 ejections, including Cincinnati Reds manager Birdie Tebbetts three times.

=== Incident ===
Delmore was involved in one of the most bizarre plays in baseball history, which happened during a game between the St. Louis Cardinals and Chicago Cubs at Wrigley Field on June 30, 1959. With the Cardinals leading 2–1 in the top of the fourth inning, Stan Musial came to bat with one out and no one on base. On a count of 3–1, Cubs' pitcher Bob Anderson's next pitch was errant, evading catcher Sammy Taylor and rolling all the way to the backstop. Delmore called ball four, but Anderson and Taylor contended that Musial foul tipped the ball. Because the ball was still in play, and because Delmore was embroiled in an argument with the catcher and pitcher, Musial took it upon himself to try for second base.

Seeing that Musial was trying for second, third baseman Alvin Dark ran to the backstop to retrieve the ball. The ball wound up in the hands of field announcer Pat Pieper, but Dark ended up getting it back. Meanwhile, Delmore pulled out a new ball and gave it to Sammy Taylor. Anderson, noticing that Musial was trying for second, took the new ball and threw it towards second baseman Tony Taylor, but the throw was high and went into the outfield. Dark, at the same time that Anderson threw the new ball, threw the original ball to shortstop Ernie Banks.

Musial did not see Dark's throw (the original ball) and only noticed Anderson's throw (the new ball) fly over the second baseman's head, so he tried to go to third base. On his way there, he was tagged by Banks. After a delay and arguments from the managers, Musial was eventually ruled out. The Cardinals filed a protest, which became moot when they won the game 4–1, and thus the play stood. This was the first known occurrence in Major League Baseball history in which two balls were in play simultaneously.

=== Aftermath ===
Delmore's umpiring contract was not renewed for the 1960 season by the National League, despite a "deluge" of telegrams from fans who considered his termination unjust. Less than a year after the incident, Delmore died at age 44, reportedly from heart disease. He was buried in Mount Carmel Cemetery in his hometown. He was survived by his mother Catherine, and by his wife of six months, Sonja Bochmann, a former secretary who had worked at the National League offices.

Alvin Dark, involved in the infamous play, recalled years later, "It was a mess and I really felt sorry for Vic Delmore. ... I don't remember everything about it but I do remember everyone laughed at Vic Delmore. That play ruined him, and he was a great fellow and a good umpire."

== See also ==
- List of Major League Baseball umpires (disambiguation)
