= Alvin Dark =

American baseball player and manager (1922–2014)

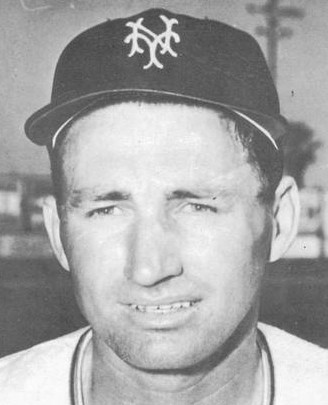
- Dark, c. 1955
- Shortstop / Manager
- Born: January 7, 1922; Comanche, Oklahoma, U.S.
- Died: November 13, 2014 (aged 92); Easley, South Carolina, U.S.
- Batted: Right Threw: Right

MLB debut
- July 14, 1946, for the Boston Braves

Last MLB appearance
- October 2, 1960, for the Milwaukee Braves

MLB statistics
- Batting average: .289
- Hits: 2,089
- Home runs: 126
- Runs batted in: 757
- Managerial record: 994–954
- Winning %: .510
- Stats at Baseball Reference
- Managerial record at Baseball Reference

Teams
- As player: Boston Braves (1946, 1948–1949); New York Giants (1950–1956); St. Louis Cardinals (1956–1958); Chicago Cubs (1958–1959); Philadelphia Phillies (1960); Milwaukee Braves (1960); As manager: San Francisco Giants (1961–1964); Kansas City Athletics (1966–1967); Cleveland Indians (1968–1971); Oakland Athletics (1974–1975); San Diego Padres (1977); As coach: Chicago Cubs (1965, 1977)

Career highlights and awards
- 3× All-Star (1951, 1952, 1954); 2× World Series champion (1954, 1974); Rookie of the Year (1948)

Alvin Ralph Dark (January 7, 1922 – November 13, 2014), nicknamed "Blackie" and "the Swamp Fox", was an American professional baseball shortstop and manager. He played fourteen years in Major League Baseball (MLB) for the Boston/Milwaukee Braves (1946, 1948–49, 1960), the New York Giants (1950–1956), the St. Louis Cardinals (1956–1958), the Chicago Cubs (1958–59), and the Philadelphia Phillies (1960). Later, he managed the San Francisco Giants (1961–1964), the Kansas City/Oakland Athletics (1966–67, 1974–75), the Cleveland Indians (1968–1971), and the San Diego Padres (1977). He was a three-time All-Star and a two-time World Series champion, once as a player (1954) and once as a manager (1974).

Born in Oklahoma, Dark grew up in Lake Charles, Louisiana. He played baseball, basketball, and football at Louisiana State University before transferring to Southwestern Louisiana Institute to engage in officer training for the United States Marine Corps. After serving in the Marines in 1945 and 1946, he signed with the Braves, debuting with them later that year. He spent 1947 in the minor leagues, then was named the major leagues' 1948 Rookie of the Year after batting .322 for the Boston Braves. Following the 1949 season, he was traded to the Giants, who were looking to improve their speed and fielding. Named the captain by Giants manager Leo Durocher, he hit .300 or more three times while playing for the Giants, and became the first National League (NL) shortstop to hit 20 home runs more than once. He batted over .400 in the 1951 World Series and the 1954 World Series, the latter of which New York won by sweeping the Cleveland Indians. Traded to the Cardinals in 1956, Dark served as their starting shortstop through the beginning of the 1958 season, when his diminished range caused him to be shifted to third base. He spent most of 1958 and all of 1959 with the Cubs, then played for the Phillies and Braves in 1960 before retiring as a player. Dark had 2,089 hits in his career. Of the three shortstops in New York following World War II, Dark had a higher batting average and more home runs than Phil Rizzuto or Pee Wee Reese; despite that fact, he is the only one of the three not in the National Baseball Hall of Fame and Museum. In the timespan of his career, only three players had more hits than him.

With his career over, Dark was traded to the Giants after the 1960 season so he could be named manager for the upcoming 1961 season. In his first four seasons in San Francisco, the Giants had a winning record, with the peak being the team reaching the World Series in 1962, losing to the New York Yankees in a close seven-game contest. Dark became embroiled in controversy in 1964 after a Newsday article accused him of making racist comments, a claim denied by Dark, whose character was vouched for by Jackie Robinson. He was fired following the 1964 season, in which the Giants narrowly missed the pennant. After a year as the Cubs’ third base coach, he was hired to manage the Athletics in 1966. He only lasted two years with Kansas City before getting dismissed over a dispute with Charlie Finley about a player suspension. Hired to manage the Indians for 1968, Dark took on the dual role of general manager and field manager in 1969. The Indians finished third place in the American League (AL) in 1968 but had losing seasons the next three years, and Dark was fired in mid-1971 even though there were still two years remaining on his contract. Rehired to manage the Athletics in 1974, Dark became the third manager to win pennants in the NL and the AL. He led the team to its third straight World Series win and another playoff berth in 1975. During a church talk in 1975, he mentioned that Finley would be going to Hell if he did not accept Jesus Christ as his personal Savior, and the owner fired Dark after the season, saying he was "too busy with church activities." Dark was hired one last time as a manager for San Diego in the middle of 1977. Finishing out the year with them, he hoped to be retained for 1978, but new general manager Bob Fontaine Sr. elected to go with Roger Craig, firing Dark in the middle of 1978 spring training. Following his managerial career, Dark held jobs as a minor league director for the Cubs and Chicago White Sox in the 1980s. He moved to Easley, South Carolina, in 1983, where he lived before dying of Alzheimer's disease in 2014.

== Early life ==
Alvin Ralph Dark was born on January 7, 1922, in Comanche, Oklahoma, the third-oldest of four children of Ralph and Cordia Dark. Ralph was a tool pusher for oil drillers. After living in Oklahoma and Texas, the Darks moved to Lake Charles, Louisiana, where Alvin spent much of his formative years. Malaria and diphtheria prevented Dark from being able to attend school until he turned seven, but by the time he reached high school, he was playing baseball, basketball, and football. As a tailback, Dark was an All-State and All-Southern player for Lake Charles High School, and he captained the basketball team as well. The school did not have a baseball team, but Dark played American Legion baseball in his teens. He was offered a basketball scholarship from Texas A&M University, but he turned it down in favor of a baseball and basketball scholarship from Louisiana State University (LSU).

== College career ==
Dark was a member of Phi Delta Theta at LSU. During his sophomore year in 1942–43, he lettered in baseball, basketball, and football. Used as a halfback by the football team, he averaged 7.2 yards rushing, gaining 433 yards on 60 attempts. With World War II occurring, he transferred through the V-12 program to Southwestern Louisiana Institute (SLI, now the University of Louisiana at Lafayette), in order to train to be an officer in the United States Marine Corps. Playing tailback for the most successful football team in school history in 1943, he helped SLI to an undefeated season in 1943 and a New Year's Day victory in the Oil Bowl. Against Arkansas A&M College in the 24–7 victory, Dark ran for a touchdown, passed for another, and kicked a field goal as well as three extra points. Meanwhile, he batted .462 for the baseball team, also participating on the basketball and golf teams. Then, Dark went to Parris Island and Camp Lejeune, completing basic training for the Marines before getting sworn in as an officer at Quantico, Virginia, in 1945. He would ultimately complete his bachelor's degree at SLI in 1947, after his professional baseball career had already begun.

== Military service ==
After receiving his Marine commission, Dark was sent to Pearl Harbor to await assignment. He was briefly sent to Saipan to be part of a machine-gun outfit, but after one day, he was sent back to Pearl Harbor because the military wanted him on the Marine Corps football team. In December, after the war was over, he was sent to China, where he helped support the Nationalist forces in the Chinese Civil War by guarding a supply station 45 miles south of Peking and transporting supplies to another station. Dark spent four months doing this, but he and his squad did not realize that one of the towns they passed through was Communist-controlled. "A month after I got back to the States, I received word that the Marines who took our place were ambushed in the Communist town and massacred," he wrote in his autobiography.

== Professional career ==
Upon his return to the States in 1946, Dark discovered he had been drafted by the Philadelphia Eagles in the 1945 NFL draft. He preferred baseball over football, however, and Ted McGrew, a scout for the Boston Braves, was impressed with Dark's "tenacity and competitive spirit in all sports," according to Eric Aron of the Society for American Baseball Research. Dark signed a $50,000 contract with the Braves on July 4, 1946, joining them 10 days later when his military service ended.

=== Boston Braves (1946, 1948–49) ===
Dark's Major League Baseball (MLB) debut came on July 14, 1946, when he was used as a pinch runner for Don Padgett in a 5–2 loss in the second game of a doubleheader against the Pittsburgh Pirates. On August 8, he had his first hit, doubling against Lefty Hoerst as the Philadelphia Phillies beat the Braves by a score of 9–8. Used strictly as a reserve player and only about once every five games, Dark made only 15 appearances for the Braves in 1946, getting three hits (all doubles) in 13 at bats.

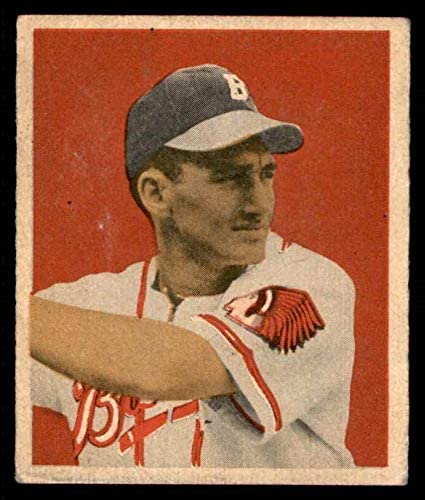
1949 Bowman baseball card of Dark with the Boston Braves

In 1947, Dark hoped to be the Braves' starting shortstop, but manager Billy Southworth elected to go with the veteran Sibby Sisti at the position. Dark was sent to the Milwaukee Brewers, an American Association team that was the Braves' top affiliate, for the only season he would spend in the minor leagues. As the starting shortstop for the Brewers, he was named an All-Star and Rookie of the Year, finishing third in American Association Most Valuable Player (MVP) voting. Dark led the league in runs scored (121) and doubles (49), also ranking among the league leaders in hits (186, third behind John Douglas's 195 and Bud Stewart's 189) and stolen bases (14, tied with Charlie Ray for ninth). He batted .303 with 10 home runs and 66 runs batted in (RBI). Defensively, though he led the league in errors, he earned a reputation for steady play at the shortstop position.

Though he was not called up in 1947, Dark made the Braves' Opening Day roster in 1948 as a reserve infielder, as Sisti was still the starting shortstop – but this would soon change. "First I got cut up on a takeout at second base, and that knocked me out of the lineup for a couple of weeks," Sisti said. "Dark went in, and he didn't do too well. Then I went in and I didn't do too well, so they put Dark back in. This time he clicked, and he stayed there the rest of the year." In just his second game of the year, the second half of a doubleheader against the New York Giants, Dark had a season-high three RBI despite not entering the game until the third inning. By June, Dark and second baseman Eddie Stanky were showing their skill at turning double plays together. From June 20 through July 11, Dark had a 23-game hitting streak, three short of Guy Curtright's record for rookies. During that streak, he hit his first major league home run, against Elmer Singleton in a 12–3 win over the Pirates. In his first full major league season, Dark ranked among the NL leaders in batting average (.322, fourth), hits (175, fifth), and doubles (39, third behind Stan Musial's 46 and Del Ennis's 40). He scored 85 runs, hit three home runs, and had 48 RBI. Dark was named the MLB Rookie of the Year in 1948, the second winner of the award (after Jackie Robinson) and the last winner before the Baseball Writers' Association of America (BBWAA) started giving separate awards for the best rookie in the American League (AL) and the National League (NL). Dark also finished third in MLB MVP voting in 1948 after playing a vital part of the Braves' run to the pennant, their first since 1914. He struggled in the World Series, though, hitting only .167 as the Braves dropped the World Series to the Cleveland Indians, four games to two. In Game 3, he committed an error that allowed Gene Bearden to score the first run of the game in a 2–0 loss to the Indians.

Dark remained the Braves' starting shortstop in 1949. He had four hits on May 13 in a 10-inning, 6–5 win over the Brooklyn Dodgers. On May 18 and May 21, he had three-RBI games, in a 13–9 loss to the Cincinnati Reds and an 8–2 victory over the Pirates. On July 9, he had to be carried off the field after being hit in the head by a throw from Granny Hamner, but he was not seriously injured. He had two hits and three RBI on August 20, in a 4–0 victory over the Dodgers. In 130 games (529 at bats), Dark batted .276 with 74 runs scored, 146 hits, three home runs, and 53 RBI. He finished 25th in MVP voting after the season.

After winning the pennant in 1948, the Braves fell to fourth place in the league, with a 75–79 record. The New York Giants, the fifth place team, were looking to become a more multidimensional team by trading some of their power hitters for faster players that were better at defense. On December 14, the Braves traded Dark and Stanky to the Giants for Sid Gordon, Willard Marshall, Red Webb, and Buddy Kerr. Giants fans were initially disappointed at the deal, as Gordon was a fan favorite and Stanky was notorious for having excelled with the Giants' rivals, the Dodgers.

=== New York Giants (1950–1956) ===
Upon joining the Giants, Dark was immediately named team captain by manager Leo Durocher, a surprise to many sportswriters, who had speculated that the more veteran Stanky would get the role. An Associated Press article two years later called the move "smart," speculating that Durocher had made the decision because he expected the younger Dark to be with the club longer than Stanky. Dark said, "I think Leo chose me because he knew Stanky would be the way he was regardless, and he wanted me to develop more of that brashness Stanky had and Leo loved." In the first game of a doubleheader against the Reds on May 20, 1950, Dark had four hits in an 8–0 victory. He hit a three-run home run against Bud Podbielan in the second game of a doubleheader against the Dodgers on July 4, but that was all the scoring for the Giants as they lost 5–3. On July 23, against the Chicago Cubs in Game 2 of a doubleheader, he had a home run and a two-RBI single against Johnny Schmitz as the Giants won 3–0. In the second game of a doubleheader versus the Cubs on August 2, he had a bases-clearing triple against Johnny Klippstein and an RBI-sacrifice fly against Doyle Lade as the Giants won 8–6. On September 9, his home runs against Preacher Roe were the only scores in a 2–0 win over the Dodgers. In 154 games, Dark batted .279 with 79 runs scored, 164 hits, 16 home runs, and 67 RBI. His nine stolen bases tied with Stanky's total for eighth-best in the NL.

In May 1951, Dark had four-RBI games on the first, the fifth, and the ninth, racking up four hits in each of the latter two contests; the Giants won each of the games. He had his third four-hit game of the month on May 25, adding two RBI in an 8–5 victory over the Phillies. Against the Cubs on June 9, Dark hit a three-run home run in the fourth-inning against Paul Minner, then delivered the second of back-to-back home runs off Bob Schultz in the fifth inning (with Stanky) as the Giants won 10–1. Dark made the NL All-Star team for the first time in 1951. Selected as the starting shortstop over Pee Wee Reese, he had a hit against Fred Hutchinson in the NL's 8–3 victory. In an 8–5 win over the Phillies on August 17, Dark again had four hits, this time scoring three runs. During Game 2 of a doubleheader against the Braves on September 5, he had four hits in a 9–1 victory. On September 16, in the second game of a doubleheader against the Pirates at Forbes Field, he had four hits, including an inside-the-park home run against Bill Werle as the Giants won 6–4. In 156 games, Dark had 14 home runs and 69 RBI. He led the NL with 41 doubles and also ranked among the league leaders in batting average (.303, eighth), runs scored (114, fourth, behind Musial's and Ralph Kiner's 124 and Gil Hodges's 118), hits (196, fourth, behind Richie Ashburn's 221, Musial's 205, and Carl Furillo's 197), and stolen bases (12, tied with teammate Monte Irvin for eighth). Although he led NL shortstops with 45 errors, Dark also led in putouts (295), assists (465) and double plays (114). Dark finished 12th in MVP voting after the season.

Tied with the Dodgers at the end of the season, the Giants played a three-game tie-breaker series with Brooklyn to determine the NL pennant winner. In the deciding Game 3, with the Giants trailing 4–1 in the ninth inning, Dark led off with a single against Don Newcombe. As Dark recalled, "I must have fouled off six or seven pitches with two strikes before getting that hit." He then scored three batters later on a Whitey Lockman double. Bobby Thomson followed with the Shot Heard 'Round the World, a three-run home run against Ralph Branca that clinched the pennant for the Giants. In Game 1 of the 1951 World Series against the New York Yankees, Dark hit a three-run home run against Allie Reynolds, helping the Giants to a 5–1 victory. He had an RBI single against Vic Raschi in Game 3, which the Giants won 6–2. In Game 4, he had three doubles, though the Yankees won that game 6–2. Ultimately, Dark had a hit in every game of the series, batting .417, but the Giants fell to the Yankees in six games.

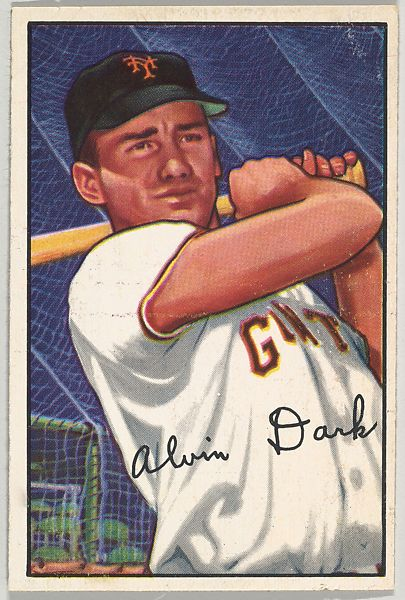
1952 Bowman baseball card of Dark with the New York Giants

The following year, 1952, Dark picked up where he'd left off. He had three hits and two runs scored, including a home run against Howie Pollet, on June 8, 1952, in a 9–1 victory over the Pirates. On June 29, he had three runs scored, three hits, and three RBI in a 12–3 victory over the Phillies. For the second year in a row, he was selected to the All-Star Game, though he did not play this time because Hamner started for the NL, and Durocher (the manager) let all the starting players (except the pitcher) play the whole game. In the first game of a doubleheader against the Cubs on July 30, his eighth inning three-run home run against Bob Rush gave the Giants three insurance runs in their 10–6 victory. He had three hits in each of three wins in a row over the Pirates on August 26, 27, and 28. On September 24, he had five hits and three runs scored, including a home run against Sheldon Jones as the Giants defeated Boston 11–8 in the first game of a doubleheader. In 151 games, Dark had 14 home runs and 73 RBI. He was seventh in the NL in runs scored (92), fourth in hits (177, behind Musial's 194, Red Schoendienst's 188, and Bobby Adams's 180), eighth in doubles (29, tied with Eddie Waitkus and Thomson), and seventh in batting average (.301). Though he lost Stanky as a double play partner (the second baseman had been traded to the Cardinals before the season), Dark still led the NL with 116 double plays turned as shortstop, now working with Davey Williams at second base. He also led the NL in putouts for the second straight year, with 324.

Entering the 1953 season, the Giants considered shifting Dark to second base, with Williams and Daryl Spencer the candidates to be the new Giants shortstop. After having made $25,000 the year before, Dark held out at the beginning of spring training, seeking a higher salary for 1953, as Reese of the Dodgers had made $40,000 the year before. On March 3, he and the Giants finally agreed on a two-year-contract that reportedly paid somewhere between $30,000 annually (what the Giants had wanted) and $35,000 annually (what Dark had wanted). Once spring training was underway, there were reports that Dark was playing indifferently at second base, hoping to force the team to move him back to shortstop. Durocher held a press conference at his hotel room to address the rumors on March 20, and Dark barged in as it was going on. "I have told Leo I will play second, third, or anywhere else he wants me to if he thinks it will improve the club," Dark said, and Durocher concurred that there was no ill feeling between him and Dark. John Drebinger of The New York Times doubted that Dark had played indifferently, noting that his worst day as a fielder in spring training occurred in a game in which he was playing shortstop, a game he had insisted on playing even though he was "not feeling well" that day.

Dark began the season at the shortstop position. Durocher shifted him to left field on June 21, then to second base on June 25, as Spencer began to get time at short. He scored four runs and had three RBI in a 20–6 victory over Brooklyn on July 5, including a two-run home run against Clem Labine. After spending much of July playing second base, Dark was shifted back to shortstop for the rest of the season on July 29, as Spencer's batting average had been low the past month. On August 26, he had five hits and five RBI, including a two-run home run against Harvey Haddix in a 13–4 victory over the Cardinals. He had back-to-back four-hit games in victories over the Cubs on August 31 and September 1. With the Giants out of playoff contention at the end of the 1953 season, Dark convinced Durocher to let him do something he had always wanted to do in the major leagues: pitch. Originally scheduled to throw the first two innings against the Pittsburgh Pirates on September 27, Dark completed only the first, giving up two runs before getting replaced by Ruben Gomez. Dark got a no decision, but the Giants lost 6–4. In 155 games, Dark batted .300 with 88 RBI. He led the NL in at bats (647) and ranked among the leaders in runs scored (126, third, behind Duke Snider's 132 and Musial's 127), hits (194, fourth, behind Ashburn's 205, Musial's 200, and Snider's 198), and doubles (41, second to Musial's 53). His 23 home runs were a record for NL shortstops at the time, though Ernie Banks would break it two years later by hitting 44.

Spencer departed to serve in the United States Army in 1954, leaving the shortstop position unquestionably Dark's. He had five hits, two runs scored, and two RBI, including a home run against Rush, on May 14 in a 9–6 victory over the Cubs. On June 3, he had four hits and scored five runs in a 13–8 victory over the Cardinals. He had four hits against Cincinnati the next day, then had back-to-back four-hit games again against the Milwaukee Braves on June 8 and 9. In the first game of a doubleheader against the Phillies on July 5, Dark had four hits, three runs scored, and an RBI in a 10–0 victory. On July 10, he hit a grand slam against Max Surkont, but the home run came in a 10–7 loss to Pittsburgh. He was the starting shortstop in the All-Star Game, recording a single against Bob Keegan in the NL's 11–9 loss to the AL. On August 6, he hit a solo home run against Gene Conley of the Braves. An irate Conley returned to the Braves' dugout and thundered, "I'm gonna get that ––––. I'm gonna part his hair for that. That ––– is hitting me too good." Next time Dark batted, Conley threw a pitch towards his chin, leaving Dark face first on the ground as the hitter dove out of the way. His last time at bat that night, Dark hit another home run against Dave Jolly, but the Giants lost to the Braves by a score of 6–5. He had four-hit games on August 14 and September 1, but these both came in losses. In 1954, he batted .293 and was fifth in the MVP voting as the Giants won the pennant. He had 98 runs scored, 26 doubles, and 70 RBI. Dark led the NL in at bats (644) as well as games (tied for first with 154) and also finished seventh in hits (189). His 20 home runs made him the first NL shortstop to hit at least 20 home runs in multiple seasons. Defensively, though he led the league in errors (36), he provided solid play at the shortstop position.

In the 1954 World Series, the Giants faced the Cleveland Indians, who had set an AL record with 111 wins. Dark batted .412 with a hit in every game. He had three hits and scored two runs in Game 4 as the Giants pulled off the sweep to win their first championship since 1933. In the World Series parade, Dark rode in the first car with Willie Mays in front of 500,000 parade-goers in New York City.

On April 23, 1955, the Giants were playing the Dodgers at Ebbets Field. Sal Maglie had been throwing brushback pitches past the heads of several Brooklyn hitters, and irritated third baseman Jackie Robinson took revenge by hitting Williams with a shoulder block as he charged into first base in the fourth inning. Williams was knocked unconscious and had to be taken off the field on a stretcher, and Dark attempted to fight Robinson. Both benches cleared, but umpire Tom Gorman kept Dark from doing anything more than yelling. Between innings, Dark conferred with his teammates and issued a challenge: "Somebody's got to get him." It was decided that the first runner to reach third base would be charged with this task. Next inning, Dark got a hit against Carl Erskine and ran hard into Robinson at third base. The two exchanged words again, but umpire Babe Pinelli kept things from getting out of hand. On the following day, with the Giants trailing Brooklyn 5–3 in the ninth, Dark hit a two-run home run against Billy Loes to tie the game; the Giants won the next inning 11–10. In the second game of a doubleheader against the Cubs on May 15, Dark had four hits and scored two runs in a 9–4 victory. He hit a three-run home run against Murry Dickson on July 7 in an 8–5 victory over the Phillies. In the second game of a doubleheader against Cincinnati on August 7, Dark hurt his rib after colliding with first baseman Ted Kluszewski. He thought the injury was a bruise and tried to play again on August 14, but he had to leave that game early and was later diagnosed with a broken rib. The injury kept him out until September 1, but he only played two games upon his return before he tripped over a base in a game against the Phillies on September 2, separating his shoulder. That injury kept him out the rest of the season. Together, the injuries cost Dark 40 games. In 115 games, Dark batted .282 with 77 runs scored, 134 hits, 20 doubles, nine home runs, and 45 RBI. After the season, Dark was awarded the first Lou Gehrig Memorial Award, given to the player who best exemplified Gehrig's character and integrity both on and off the field.

Recovered from his injuries by 1956, Dark was back in the lineup for Opening Day. He batted .364 in April but only hit .222 in his next 37 games, through June 15. That June, the Giants were searching for a second baseman. Meanwhile, the Cardinals wanted a shortstop and also desired to trade second baseman Red Schoendienst, as prospect Don Blasingame seemed ready to take over the position and St. Louis wanted to trade the veteran before his skills declined.

=== St. Louis Cardinals (1956–1958) ===
On June 14, Dark, Lockman, Ray Katt, Don Liddle, and cash were traded to the Cardinals for Schoendienst, Bill Sarni, Dick Littlefield, Jackie Brandt, and two players to be named later (eventually Bob Stephenson and Gordon Jones). In 48 games with the Giants, Dark batted .252 with 19 runs scored, 52 hits, two home runs, and 17 RBI.

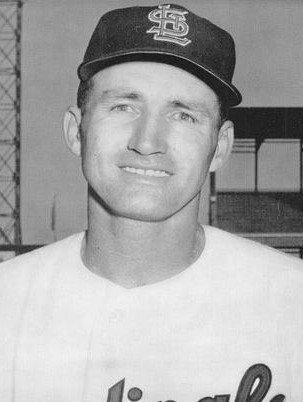
Dark in 1957

Facing the Giants on July 12, 1956, Dark hit a seventh-inning sacrifice fly against Marv Grissom to snap a 3–3 tie in a 5–3 victory. The next day, Dark had four hits and three RBI, including a tie-breaking two-run double in the eighth inning against Hoyt Wilhelm as the Cardinals defeated New York by a score of 7–5. In the third game of the series, he had three RBI in a 5–2 victory. Then, in the first game of a July 15 doubleheader against Philadelphia, he had three hits, two runs scored, and four RBI in St. Louis's 9–1 victory. On September 14, Dark had four hits and scored three runs, including a two-run home run against Mike McCormick, in a 9–4 victory over the Giants. In 100 games for St. Louis, Dark batted .286 with 54 runs scored, 118 hits, four home runs, and 37 RBI. His combined totals between the Giants and the Cardinals were a .275 batting average, 73 runs scored, 170 hits, 26 doubles, six home runs, and 54 RBI.

By 1957, Dark's range was not as wide as it once had been; the season would be his last as a shortstop. "I got by knowing the hitters, knowing where to play, what to look for," he wrote in his autobiography. He hit only four home runs in 1957, three of which came against the Giants. In Game 1 of a doubleheader against Cincinnati on May 30, he had three RBI in a 7–2 victory. On June 11, he had four hits and an RBI in a 5–2 victory over the Phillies. He had four hits, two runs scored, and an RBI on July 3 in a 5–4 victory over the Cubs. On July 31, he had four hits and two RBI in a 5–1 victory over the Giants. He had three RBI in a 10–1 victory over the Braves on September 1. In 140 games, Dark batted .290 with 80 runs scored, 169 hits, 25 doubles, and 64 RBI. Despite his diminished range, he led the NL in putouts (276) and double plays (105) for the third time.

Late in 1958 spring training, Dark had to be removed from a game after getting hit by a pitch from Dick Donovan, but he was back in the lineup by Opening Day. He started the year at shortstop but, after making two errors in his first four games, was moved to third base in favor of Ducky Schofield.

=== Chicago Cubs (1958–1959) ===
After batting .297 in 18 games, Dark was traded to the Cubs on May 20 for Jim Brosnan.

After the trade to the Cubs, Dark continued to play third base, as Banks was the shortstop. He had three hits, three RBI, and a run scored on May 23 in an 11–4 victory over the Phillies. On June 20, he had four hits and three RBI in an 11–3 victory over Cincinnati. Two days later, in the second game of a doubleheader against Cincinnati, he had two hits and three RBI in an 8–6 victory. In the second game of a doubleheader against the Phillies on July 13, he had four hits and scored both Cub runs in a 2–1 victory. His two-RBI single against Don Erickson in the 10th inning on September 16 snapped an 8–8 tie in a 10–8 victory over the Phillies. In 114 games with the Cubs, Dark batted .295 with 54 runs scored, 137 hits, 16 doubles, three home runs, and 43 RBI. He played 132 games combined for both teams, batting .295 with 61 runs scored, 156 hits, 16 doubles, four homes runs, and 48 RBI.

In 1959, Dark remained at third base. He had three hits, scored three runs, and had two RBI on May 13 in a 10–0 win over Cincinnati. On June 30, in a game against the Cardinals, Dark had a role in one of baseball history's most unusual plays. Musial was at the plate, with a count of 3–1. Pitcher Bob Anderson threw a wild pitch that evaded catcher Sammy Taylor and rolled all the way to the backstop. Umpire Vic Delmore called ball four, but Anderson and Taylor contended that Musial foul tipped the ball. As the ball was still in play, and because Delmore was embroiled in an argument with the catcher and pitcher, Musial decided to try to advance to second base. Seeing that Musial was trying for second, Dark ran to the backstop to retrieve the ball. A ball boy had tossed it towards field announcer Pat Pieper, who was in charge of holding baseballs for the umpire, but Dark picked it up before it could get to Pieper. Absentmindedly, however, Delmore pulled out a new ball and gave it to Taylor. Anderson finally noticed that Musial was trying for second, took the new ball, and threw it to second baseman Tony Taylor. Anderson's throw flew over Tony Taylor's head into the outfield. Dark, at the same time that Anderson threw the new ball, threw the original ball to Banks. Musial did not see Dark's throw and tried to go to third base, having seen Anderson's ball fly over the second baseman's head. On his way there, he was tagged by Banks, and after a delay, Musial was ruled out. Still, the Cardinals won the game by a score of 4–1.

Dark hit only six home runs in 1959, three of which came in consecutive games from August 11–13. In the third, on August 13, the home run was a grand slam against McCormick in a 20–9 victory over the Giants. His two-run double against Jack Sanford provided the only runs for Chicago in a 2–1 victory over the Giants on September 4. On September 26, he hit a three-run home run against Podres in a 12–2 victory over the Dodgers. In 136 games, he batted .264 with 60 runs scored, 126 hits, 22 doubles, a career-high nine triples, and 45 RBI.

=== Philadelphia Phillies (1960) ===
On January 11, 1960, Dark was traded with John Buzhardt and Jim Woods to the Phillies in exchange for Ashburn. "Trades tell you exactly which side of the hill you're on," he wrote in his 1980 autobiography, contrasting this deal with the trade that sent him and Stanky to New York, where four players were given up for those two. He began the year as Philadelphia's starting third baseman. Facing the Braves in the second game of the year, on April 14, he notched his 2,000th hit, a single against Don McMahon in the sixth inning of an eventual 10-inning, 5–4 victory. He hit back-to-back home runs against the Dodgers on May 6 and 7.

=== Milwaukee Braves (1960) ===
After hitting .242 in 55 games, Dark was traded back to the Braves (now in Milwaukee) on June 23 for "Walpole" Joe Morgan (not to be confused with the Hall of Famer of the same name). With Milwaukee, Dark served as a pinch hitter and utility player. In September, he got most of the starts for the Braves in left field. He appeared in his last major league game on October 2, playing left field in a 9–5 loss to Pittsburgh. Dark hit .298 in 50 games for Milwaukee. In 105 games combined between the teams, he batted .265 with 45 runs scored, 90 hits, 11 doubles, four home runs, and 32 RBI.

After the season, Braves manager Charlie Dressen told Dark that if he returned for the 1961 season, "you'll be my utility infielder-outfielder." To Dark, playing the game was becoming more of an occupation than a joy, and he feared being sent to the minor leagues. Rather than try to hang on another year as a player, he decided to retire. Over a 14-year major league career, Dark recorded a .289 career batting average, 2,089 hits, 358 doubles, 126 home runs, 1,064 runs scored, and 757 RBI over 1,828 games played. Defensively, he recorded a .959 fielding percentage.

== Managerial career ==
=== San Francisco Giants (1961–1964) ===
1963 SportsService photo of Dark for San Francisco Giants

Dark was traded back to the Giants (who had moved to San Francisco after the 1957 season) for Andre Rodgers on October 30, 1960, a move made so the team could hire Dark as their new manager. Giants owner Horace Stoneham tried to fill coaching vacancies with former Giants players, rewarding loyalty to the organization. Upon becoming manager of the Giants, one of the first things Dark did was rearrange the team's locker assignments so that players were no longer grouped by race. Tex Maule of Sports Illustrated wrote in May 1961, "the Giants are no longer a conglomerate of stars, divided roughly along color lines, with no sense of being a team." During a fit of rage following a 1–0 loss to the Phillies on June 26, Dark threw a metal stool against the wall, then realized he'd lost part of the tip of his little finger. "I made up my mind two weeks ago not to take my anger out on the players. So, I guess I took it out on myself tonight," he quipped. In his first year as manager of the Giants, Dark oversaw a team that finished third in the NL with an 85–69 record.

During the 1962 season, the Giants battled the Dodgers for the NL pennant, as both teams occupied the top two spots in the league starting May 10. One sore spot in the rivalry concerned infield dirt. The Dodgers used to pack the dirt at Dodger Stadium tightly, creating a hard infield that made it easier for Maury Wills, who would steal 104 bases in 1962, to run on. When Dark's complaints fell on deaf ears, he decided to get revenge at Candlestick Park. Before a Dodger series with three weeks to go in the season, Dark had the groundskeepers soak the infield around first base; the muddy soil prevented anybody from getting enough of a foothold to steal bases. For the incident, Dark earned the nickname "The Swamp Fox." The Dodgers had a four-game lead with seven games to go in the season, but San Francisco pulled into a tie on the final day of the season, necessitating another tie-breaker series. Prevailing in three games, the Giants faced the Yankees in the World Series. In a nailbiter, the teams forced the series all the way to its maximum seven games, with the Giants losing 1–0 in the series finale after Bobby Richardson snared a Willie McCovey line drive that likely would have won the series for the Giants had it been a hit.

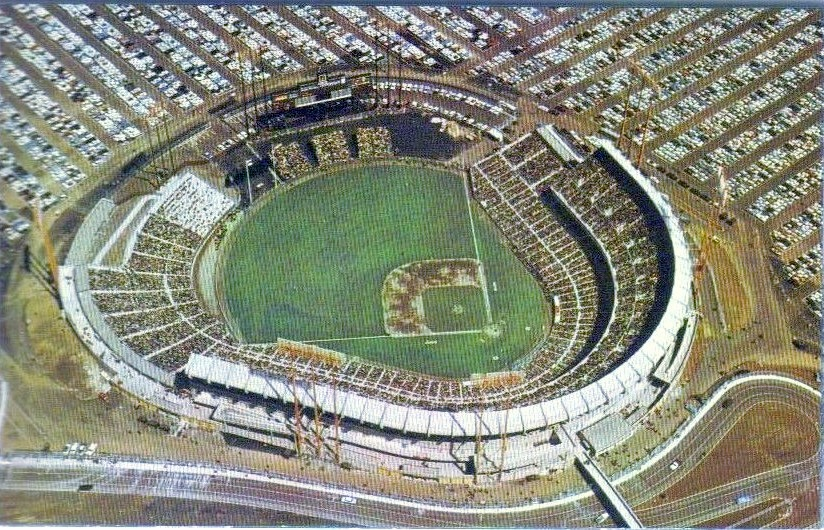
Candlestick Park, the Giants' home stadium during Dark's managerial tenure, where he once had the infield flooded to keep Maury Wills from stealing bases.

Dark had a rocky relationship with Orlando Cepeda, one of the Giants' most popular players. During 1963 spring training, while Cepeda was refusing to play in hopes of getting a higher-paying contract, Dark revealed to the press that he had a point system by which he rated the players. When asked about Cepeda, Dark responded, "He's got more minuses than anybody." "It may have been unfair for me to bring it up," Dark admitted later. The two squabbled over the next two seasons about Cepeda's supposed lack of hustle, with the player blaming a sore knee. In 1963, the Giants had a winning record all season but did not fare quite as well as in 1962, winning 11 fewer games and finishing 11 games behind the Dodgers for the pennant.

In 1964, Dark named Willie Mays the captain of the Giants, making Mays the first African-American captain in Major League Baseball. "You should have had it long before this," Dark told the player. Sports Illustrated reported on July 6 that Stoneham was thinking of firing Dark amidst rumors that the two were not speaking. Dark later wrote in his autobiography that his relationship with Stoneham had been rocky ever since Stoneham discovered in 1963 that the manager was having an affair. "You can't handle your ball players if you can't handle yourself," he had told Dark. "You've got rules you are breaking." On July 23, Dark became embroiled in controversy when Stan Isaacs of Newsday quoted him as saying the number of black and Hispanic players on the team was a source of trouble: "They are just not able to perform up to the white player when it comes to mental alertness." Dark responded that he had been severely misquoted; Mays, whom he had named as team captain, met with several of the black and Hispanic players at the Carlton House in Pittsburgh (where the Giants were on a road trip) and calmed the team, reminding them that their best chance of winning came if Dark remained the manager the rest of the year. "I have known Dark for many years, and my relationships with him have always been exceptional," said Jackie Robinson. "I have found him to be a gentleman and, above all, unbiased." Dark considered suing the paper, but decided not to after he was told that Newsday would respond by publicizing his affair with Jackie Troy, an airline stewardess. "You don't have to be prejudiced if you are accused of it," Dark later wrote in his autobiography. "The accusation convicts you every time." The Giants were contenders for the pennant most of the season, and they ended the year just three games out of first place; however, in 1964, that was fourth place in a close three-way race. Stoneham fired Dark during the sixth inning of the last game of the season, after the Giants had been eliminated from playoff contention.

After his dismissal from the Giants, Dark became a third base coach for the Cubs in 1965. He made it clear to the general manager John Holland that he was not interested in becoming the Cubs' manager, as he found the notion of coaching under a current manager while being readied to replace him "offensive." With a month to go in the season, Dark was hired as an assistant to Kansas City Athletics owner Charlie Finley.

=== Kansas City Athletics (1966–1967) ===
After the season, Dark was named manager of the last-place Athletics, who had lost 103 games in 1965. The ballclub lost 14 of its first 17 games in 1966 but was one game under .500 for the rest of the year, resulting in a 15-game improvement and a seventh-place finish in the ten-team American League. As the season progressed, Dark made sure he utilized the young starting pitchers to get them experience; entering the 1967 season, the Athletics had five starters with an average age of 21.8. Their seventh-place finish in 1966 was Kansas City's finest since Finley had purchased the team, and the grateful owner rewarded Dark with a Cadillac after the season. Their record was not quite as good in 1967, as Dark piloted them to a 52–69 record in their first 131 games. His second season with the Athletics ended in August, due to a disagreement over player discipline after Finley fined and suspended pitcher Lew Krausse Jr. for his behavior on a team flight. Dark believed, after talking to several of the other players, that Krausse had been playing little pranks on Athletics broadcaster Monte Moore, who then falsely reported to Finley that Krausse used "deplorable language" when talking to a pregnant woman on the flight. Because Dark refused to carry out the suspension, Finley asked to see him at his hotel room in Washington, D.C., where the Athletics had gone for a road trip against the Washington Senators. In a seven-hour meeting, Finley fired his manager, decided to rehire him, then fired him again when he was presented with a player's statement backing Dark and criticizing Finley's use of spies to keep tabs on the players. Additionally, Finley released first baseman Ken Harrelson, who had also stood up for Krausse. Harrelson dubbed Finley "a menace to the sport." Despite the dismissal, Dark remained in correspondence with Finley, who would often make long-distance phone calls to his ex-manager.

=== Cleveland Indians (1968–1971) ===
Dark was hired to manage the Cleveland Indians in 1968 by Vernon Stouffer; the Indians had an 86–75 record in his first year, their best performance since 1959. Sam McDowell theorized that the team would have had an even better year if they had gotten more hits with runners in scoring position. After an initial third-place season, Dark requested and was given the additional duties of general manager, but having the field manager negotiate the players' contracts proved an untenable situation. Dark eventually concluded that the same person should not hold both roles, because the general manager's job is to make the player think he is worth less money, while the manager's job is to make him think he is more valuable to the team. Over the next two seasons, the team slumped to a 62–99 record in 1969 and a 76–86 finish in 1970. With the team in last place in the AL East in mid-1971 and attendance down by 60,000, Dark was fired on July 29. Because he had signed a five-year contract with the team in 1969, Cleveland had to continue to pay him through the 1973 season.

=== Oakland Athletics (1974–1975) ===
In the meantime, the Athletics had moved to Oakland, and after manager Dick Williams resigned following consecutive World Series triumphs in 1972–73, Finley rehired Dark. A newscaster reporting on the move quipped, "The only thing worse than being hired by Charlie Finley is being hired by him a second time." Now taking his religion more seriously, Dark promised not to complain about players in public or demean them. Dark's hiring was met with resentment by some of the Athletics coaches, such as Irv Noren, the third base coach, who had hoped to be hired as manager himself. Noren and Vern Hoscheit, the bullpen coach, were replaced in July. Dark also had trouble earning the respect of Athletics pitchers such as Vida Blue and Ken Holtzman. Frequently, when he went out to the mound to replace the starter, the pitchers would disrespectfully flip the baseball to him instead of handing it over. In July, Dark had finally had enough. "I made up my mind to have a squad meeting [on July 14] at the park," he said. In the speech, he criticized the team for their attitudes, fining Blue $250. Blue paid the fine in change: "I had a big old money bag that probably weighed about 75 pounds." The speech helped the players to be more responsive to Dark, and though they would get no-hit days later by Dick Bosman of the Indians, they went on to win the AL West. In the AL Championship Series (ALCS), the Athletics defeated the Orioles three games to one, holding Baltimore scoreless for 30 straight innings during the series. The series victory sent Oakland to the World Series and made Dark the third manager (after Joe McCarthy and Yogi Berra) at the time to win pennants in both leagues. (Sparky Anderson, Dick Williams, Tony La Russa, Jim Leyland, and Joe Maddon have since accomplished that feat.) In the World Series, the Athletics faced the Dodgers in the first World Series composed of only California teams. Oakland won the series in five games, becoming the first team to win three consecutive World Series since the Yankees won five straight from 1949 to 1953.

Entering the 1975 season, the Athletics had to cope with the loss of pitcher Catfish Hunter, winner of 20 or more games four straight seasons, who had used a contract breach to become a free agent and sign with the Yankees. Still, the team posted a 55–32 record in the first half of the season, and seven Athletics were part of the AL All-Star Team, managed by Dark. The team won the AL West by seven games over the runner-up Kansas City Royals; however, they were swept in the ALCS by the Boston Red Sox. Though they made the playoffs both years under Dark, he was not re-hired as the Athletics manager in 1976. During a church talk that September, Dark had said, "To God, Charlie Finley is just a very little, bitty thing. If he doesn't accept Jesus Christ as his personal savior, he's going to hell." When Finley announced Dark would not return for 1976, he stated that the manager was "too busy with church activities."

Dark spent 1976 out of baseball for the first time in 30 years. He was hired as a coach for the Cubs in 1977, working under Herman Franks, who had coached under and later replaced Dark as the manager of the Giants. While Dark had been disappointed at the replacement, the men had remained friends and were happy to work together again. His tenure with the Cubs was short-lived.

=== San Diego Padres (1977) ===
On May 28, Dark was hired to replace John McNamara as manager of the San Diego Padres. The Padres, who had a 21–28 record when he took over, had a 48–65 record for the rest of the season. Dark's contract called for him to manage for two years, but general manager Buzzie Bavasi was replaced with Bob Fontaine Sr. in 1978, and Fontaine preferred someone other than Dark to manage the ballclub. In the midst of spring training, on March 21, Dark was fired, replaced by Roger Craig. It was only the second time that a major league manager had been fired during spring training. Because his contract ran through 1979, the Padres still had to pay him for two years, much like the Indians had been obligated to do from 1971 to 1973. Dark ended his managerial career with a 994–954 record, good for a .510 winning percentage.

During games he managed, Dark would stand in the front of his team's dugout with one foot up on the steps, drawing comparisons to Washington crossing the Delaware. He went beyond traditional statistics in evaluating players, using a point system to determine who his best were. Hits in key situations or hits that advanced a runner garnered points for players, but miscues such as overrunning a base or ignoring a sign would lead to a deduction. "There are winning .275 hitters and losing .310 hitters," Dark said of his system. Cepeda had a rather low score, which annoyed the player once he found out about it. Later in his managerial career, Dark stopped using the system, not wanting to cause resentment.

Though Dark never managed again after 1978 spring training, he did hold two other baseball positions. In 1981, the Cubs hired him to be their farm system evaluator. Later, in 1986, the Chicago White Sox hired him to be their minor league director. He was thrilled that the White Sox were hiring former major league players to coach minor league teams, something not often seen at the time.

==== Managerial record ====
Team	Year	Regular season					Postseason			
Team	Year	Games	Won	Lost	Win %	Finish	Won	Lost	Win %	Result
SF	1961	154	85	69	.552	3rd in NL	–	–	–	–
SF	1962	165	103	62	.624	1st in NL	3	4	.429	Lost World Series (NYY)
SF	1963	162	88	74	.543	3rd in NL	–	–	–	–
SF	1964	162	90	72	.556	4th in NL	–	–	–	–
SF total		643	366	277	.569		3	4	.429	
KC	1966	160	74	86	.463	7th in AL	–	–	–	–
KC	1967	121	52	69	.430	fired	–	–	–	–
CLE	1968	161	86	75	.534	3rd in AL	–	–	–	–
CLE	1969	161	62	99	.385	6th in AL East	–	–	–	–
CLE	1970	162	76	86	.469	5th in AL East	–	–	–	–
CLE	1971	103	42	61	.408	fired	–	–	–	–
CLE total		587	266	321	.453		0	0	–	
OAK	1974	162	90	72	.556	1st in AL West	7	2	.778	Won World Series (LAD)
OAK	1975	162	98	64	.605	1st in AL West	0	3	.000	Lost ALCS (BOS)
KC/ OAK total		605	314	291	.519		7	5	.583	
SD	1977	113	48	65	.425	5th in NL West	–	–	–	–
SD total		113	48	65	.425		0	0	–	
Total		1948	994	954	.510		10	9	.526	

== Legacy ==
"Dark was a great hit-and-run guy, and very tough to strike out," Phil Rizzuto, shortstop for the Yankees in the early 1950s, recalled. "And he was a fiery ballplayer. He got into more fights than either Pee Wee or me." Richard Goldstein of The New York Times observed that, of the "three superb shortstops" in New York following the war, Dark had the best batting average and the most home runs, even though he is the only one not in the Hall of Fame. Joe DiMaggio said he was a "Red Rolfe type of hitter," noting that Dark could "bunt or drag, hit behind the runner, or push the ball to the opposite field," which made him useful in the number two position in the batting lineup. In a 1969 poll, Giants fans selected Dark as the greatest shortstop in team history. According to baseball writer Bill James, Dark may have lost a Hall of Fame career due to his debut being delayed by his military service.

In 1976, Dark was inducted into the Louisiana Sports Hall of Fame. Five years later, he was elected to the LSU Athletic Hall of Fame. Alvin Dark Avenue, located just south of LSU's campus in Baton Rouge, Louisiana, is named after him.

Dark made an uncredited appearance in The Kid from Cleveland in 1949, as one of the Boston Braves shown in the film. Fifty-two years later, his 1961 Topps baseball card was featured in the 2001 film Skipped Parts, being thrown into a fire as part of a rite of passage/growing up event between a stern grandfather (R. Lee Ermey) and his grandson (Bug Hall).

== Personal life ==
Dark was married twice. His first wife, Adrienne Managan, was his childhood sweetheart; the two had grown up going to the same church. They had four children: Allison, Gene, Eve, and Margaret. In 1962, he met Jacolyn "Jackie" Troy while she was serving as an airline stewardess on a flight he was on. Although it went against his Christian beliefs, he began having an affair with her. They tried multiple times to break it off, and Dark even told his wife about it in December 1962. This led to the Darks moving back to Lake Charles after the 1963 season, so Adrienne could be nearer her family in case the couple got divorced, though Robert Boyle of Sports Illustrated thought the move meant that Dark was trying to become manager of the Houston Astros. Finally, in November 1968, Adrienne filed for legal separation from Dark, as couples in Louisiana had to be legally separated for 14 months before they could get a divorce. The divorce was finalized early in the 1970 baseball season, and Alvin married Jackie the same day he signed the last divorce papers. Though he believed divorce was sinful, "we just weren't letting God get in our way," he said of his decision to remarry. "There are people in Lake Charles who have not spoken to me since, much less forgiven me," Dark wrote in 1980. After some initial struggles, Alvin and Jackie developed a happy marriage by 1974 and stayed together for 44 years until Alvin's death in 2014. Jackie had two children from a previous marriage, Rusty and Lori, whom Dark adopted in October 1970.

Dark's nickname was "Blackie."

A Baptist, Dark had a reputation as a devout Christian. He said his parents took him to church "ever since I was old enough to breathe." During the 1960s, when he had the affair and his marriage fell apart, Dark wrote that "I had found it easier not to go to church. Easier not to take my Bible on road trips. Easier to jump on a player, or to cuss an umpire." After his time with the Indians, he began to take his faith more seriously when he started attending a Bible study with his wife. He would often quote scripture during press conferences. Dark also used to present his Christian testimony at churches, though he quit doing so from 1963 through the early 1970s because of his divorce. Finley once instructed Dark to "lay off the Bible," but the unpredictable Finley also once asked Dark to talk about his faith at a Chicago restaurant. Dark was a member of the Fellowship of Christian Athletes.

Dark was good friends with Stanky, his roommate when the two played together on the Braves and Giants. As players, both dreamed of managing major league teams one day, and Dark spoke highly of Stanky's baseball intelligence. "Stanky knew so much more about the game than anybody else. If there were ten possible percentage plays to make, most guys would know four or five. Stanky would know ten." After their careers, the two did not correspond as much; Dark speculated this was because of the divorce, as Stanky was a devout Catholic.

Dark's career in the major leagues as a player and manager spanned over 30 seasons. "Baseball is his life," said Lee Walls, who was Dark's roommate with the Cubs. "He lives, breathes and talks baseball most of the time." During offseasons, Dark would supplement his income by working for the Magabar Mud Company, which provided oil drillers with mud. Dark enjoyed golf, and Maule called him the best baseball-playing golfer "with the possible exception of...Paul Richards." He played in the Bing Crosby National Pro-Amateur in Pebble Beach, California, 12 times; and he also played in Jackie Gleason's Inverrary Classic in Palm Beach Gardens, Florida. After his dismissal from the Indians, he briefly played for money, charging as much as $100 for someone to play against him. In 1980, Dark penned an autobiography (with John Underwood) entitled When in Doubt, Fire the Manager, published by E. P. Dutton.

In 1983, Dark and Jackie moved to Easley, South Carolina, where they would live for the rest of their lives. He started the Alvin Dark Foundation, which gives money to Christian ministries. On November 13, 2014, Dark died at his home in Easley, from Alzheimer's disease, at the age of 92. He was survived by his second wife, his children, 20 grandchildren, and three great-grandchildren.

== See also ==
- List of Major League Baseball career hits leaders
- List of Major League Baseball career runs scored leaders
- List of Major League Baseball annual doubles leaders

== Book sources ==
- Dark, Alvin; Underwood, John (1980). When in Doubt, Fire the Manager: My Life and Times in Baseball. New York: E. P. Dutton. ISBN 978-0525232643.
- Hirsch, James S. (2010). Willie Mays: The Life, the Legend. New York: Scribner. ISBN 978-1416547907.
