= Lou Gehrig Memorial Award =

Major League Baseball award

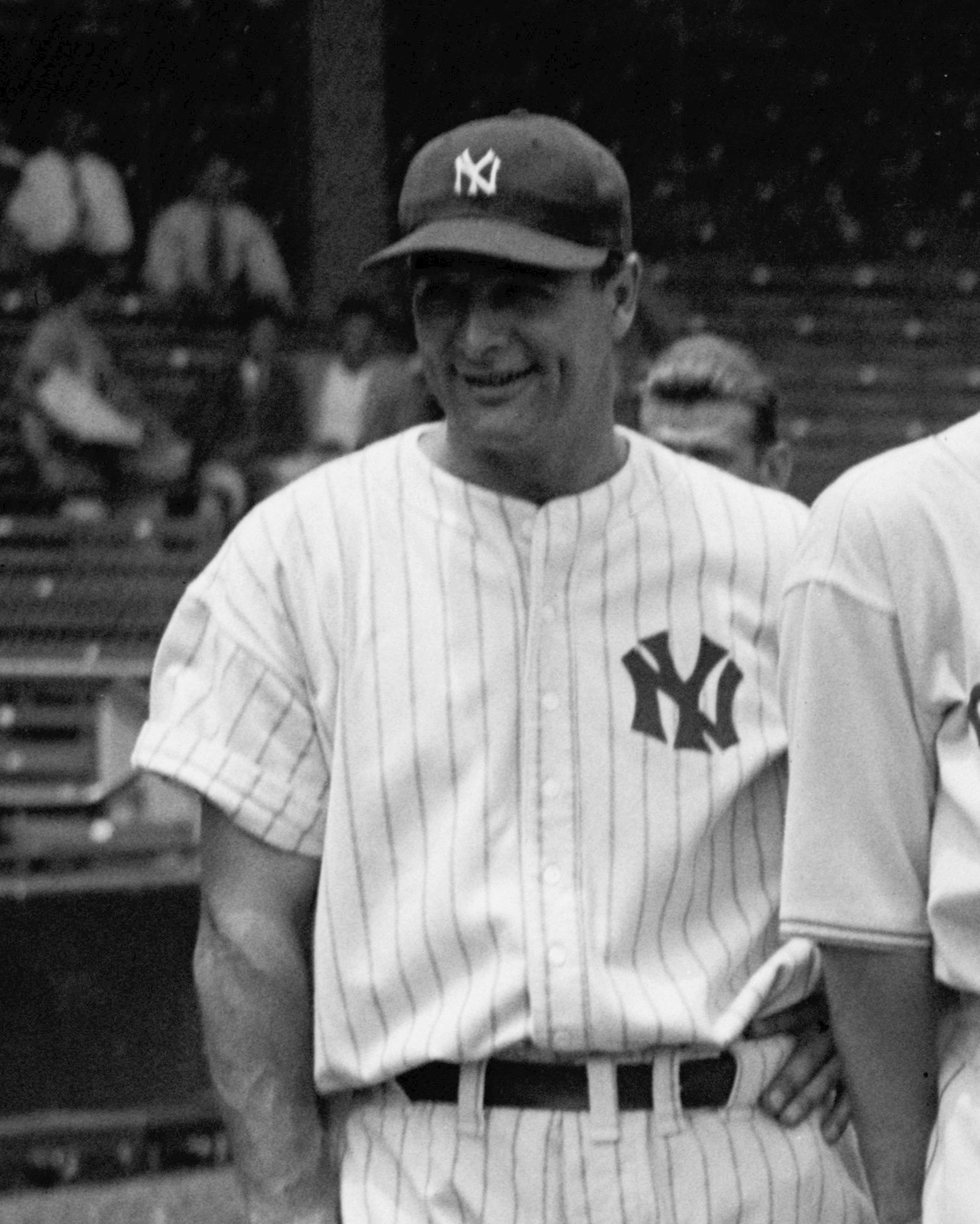
- Lou Gehrig, the namesake of the award
- Location: Cooperstown, New York
- Country: United States
- Presented by: Phi Delta Theta

History
- First award: 1955
- Most recent: Bobby Witt Jr., Kansas City Royals
- Website: Lou Gehrig Memorial Award

The Lou Gehrig Memorial Award is given annually to a Major League Baseball (MLB) player who best exhibits the character and integrity of Lou Gehrig, both on the field and off it. The award was created by the Phi Delta Theta fraternity in honor of Gehrig, who was a member of the fraternity at Columbia University. It was first presented in 1955, fourteen years after Gehrig's death. The award's purpose is to recognize a player's exemplary contributions in "both his community and philanthropy." The bestowal of the award is overseen by the headquarters of the Phi Delta Theta in Oxford, Ohio, and the name of each winner is inscribed onto the Lou Gehrig Award plaque in the Baseball Hall of Fame in Cooperstown, New York. It is the only MLB award conferred by a fraternity.

Twenty-nine winners of the Lou Gehrig Memorial Award are members of the National Baseball Hall of Fame. The inaugural winner was Alvin Dark. Curt Schilling (1995) and Shane Victorino (2008) received the award for working with the ALS Association and raising money for amyotrophic lateral sclerosis (ALS). The disease took Gehrig's life and is eponymously known as "Lou Gehrig's disease". Mike Timlin won the award in 2007 for his efforts in raising awareness and finding a cure for ALS, which took his mother's life in 2002.

Winners of the Lou Gehrig Memorial Award have undertaken a variety of different causes. Many winners, including Rick Sutcliffe, Barry Larkin, Mark McGwire, Todd Stottlemyre and Derek Jeter, worked with children in need. Jeter assisted children and teenagers in avoiding drug and alcohol addiction through his Turn 2 Foundation, while Sutcliffe visited disabled children in hospitals and bestowed college scholarships to underprivileged juveniles through his foundation. Other winners devoted their work to aiding individuals who had a specific illness, such as Albert Pujols, whose daughter has Down syndrome, and who devoted the Pujols Family Foundation to helping those with the disorder, and Ryan Zimmerman, who established the ziMS Foundation to raise money for multiple sclerosis, the disease which afflicts his mother.

== Winners ==
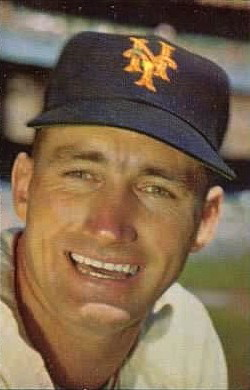
Alvin Dark won the inaugural Lou Gehrig Memorial Award in 1955.

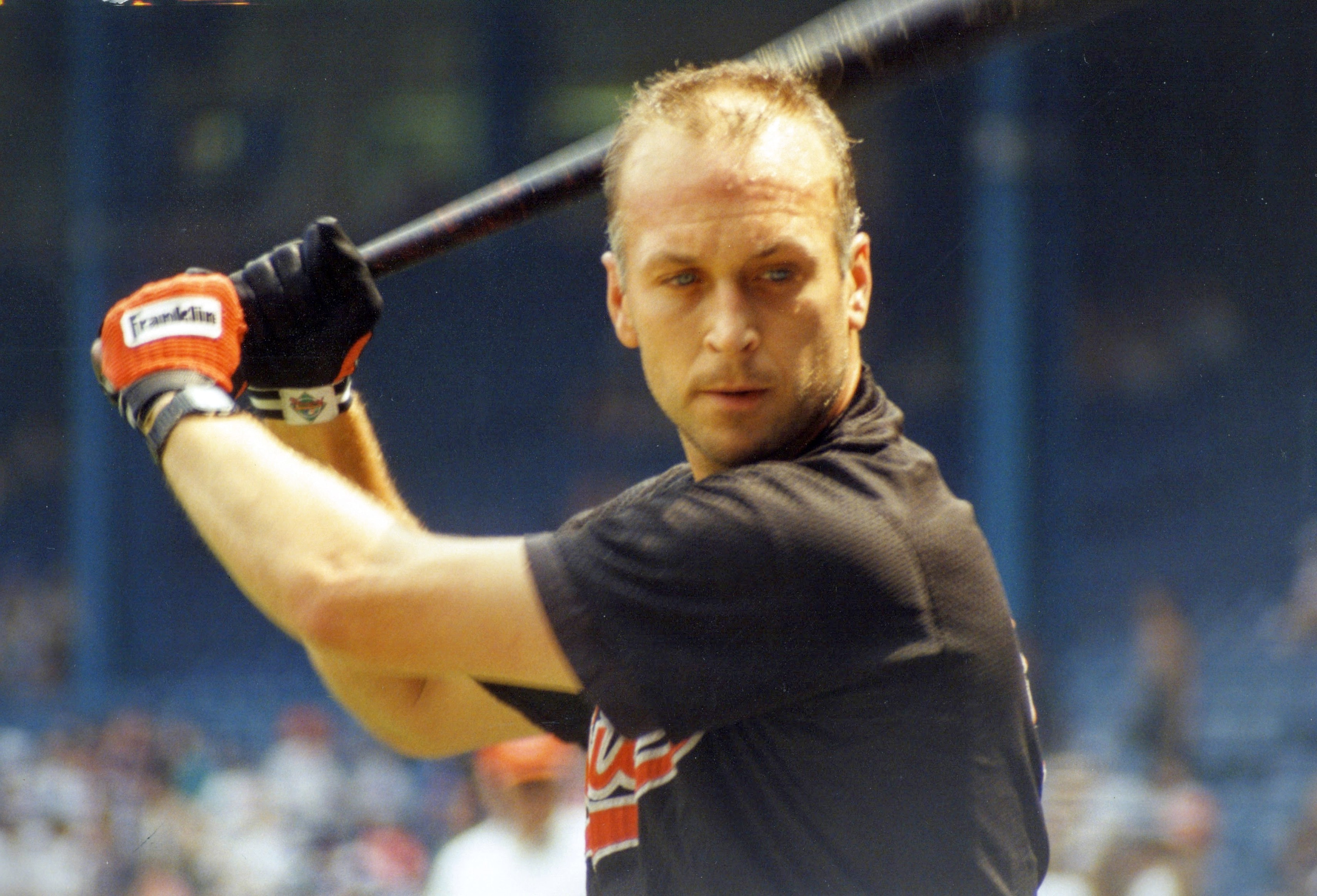
Cal Ripken Jr., the 1992 winner, surpassed Gehrig's record for consecutive games played three years later.

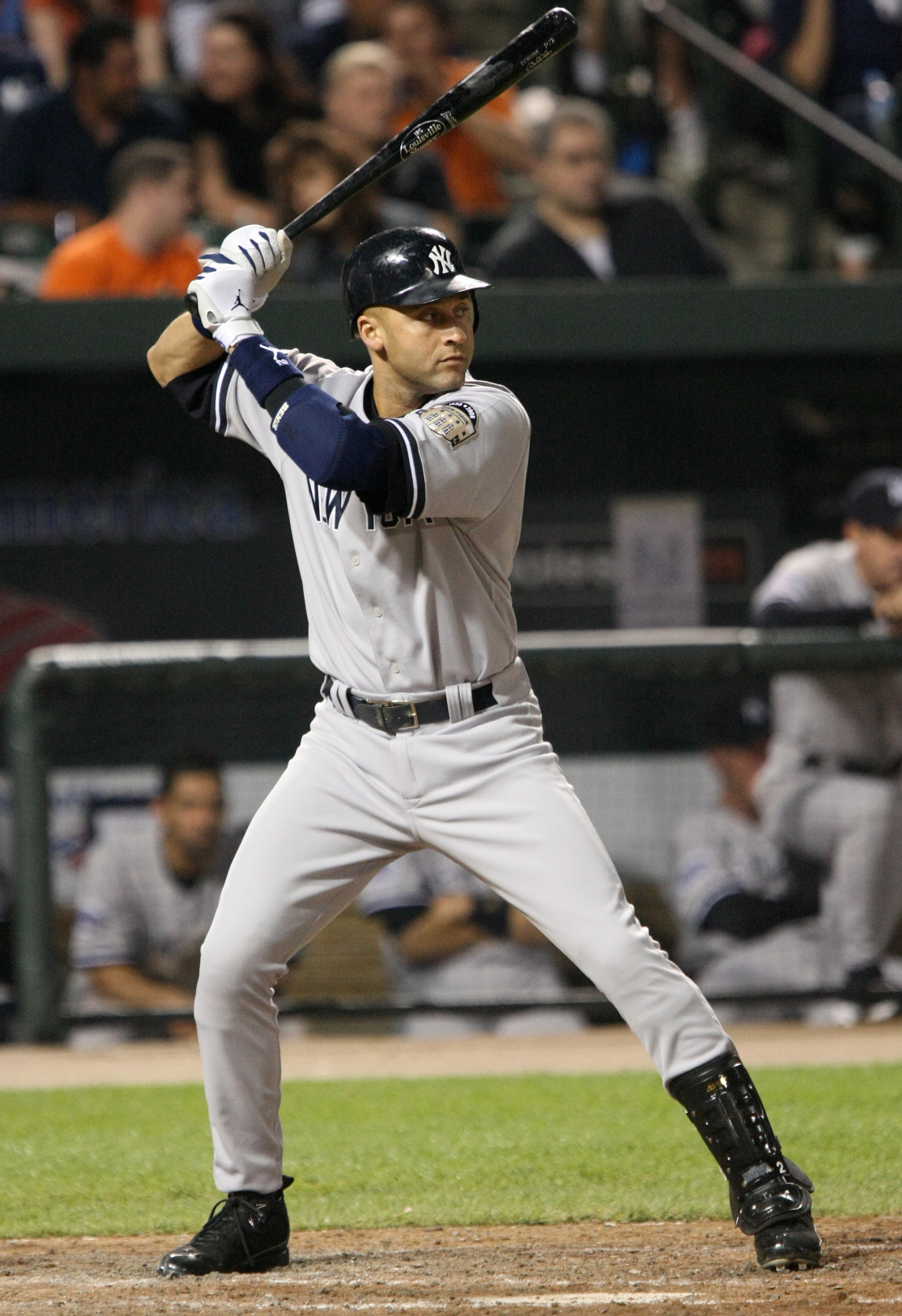
Derek Jeter, the 2010 winner, broke Gehrig's record for most hits as a member of the New York Yankees the year before.

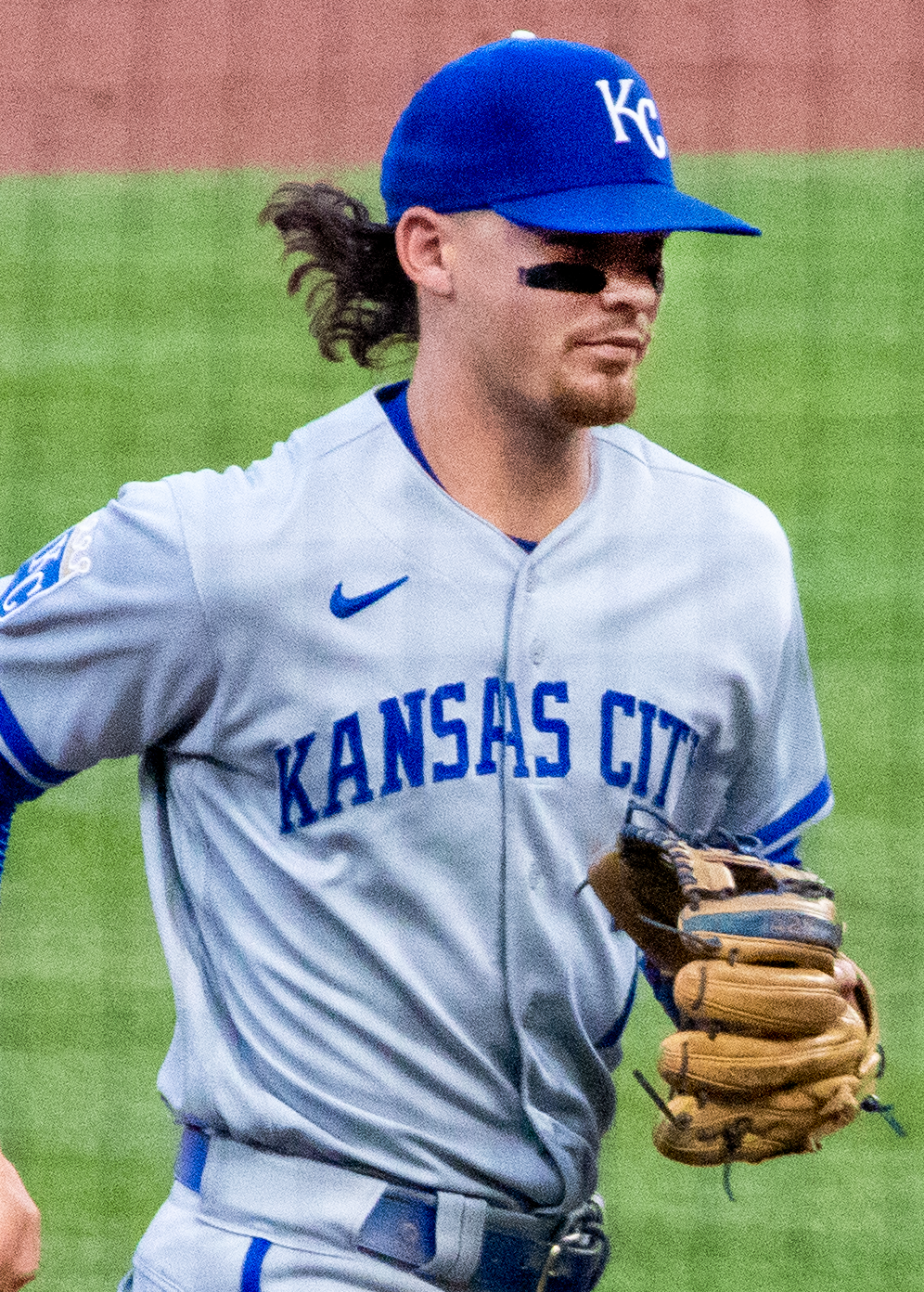
Bobby Witt Jr. is the most recent player to win the award.

Key
Year	Links to the article about the corresponding baseball year
Player	Name of the player
Team	The player's team at the time he won the award
Position	The player's position at the time he won the award
†	Member of the Baseball Hall of Fame
‡	Player is active

Winners
Year	Player	Team	Position	Ref
1955	Alvin Dark	New York Giants	Shortstop	
1956	Pee Wee Reese^{†}	Brooklyn Dodgers	Shortstop	
1957	Stan Musial^{†}	St. Louis Cardinals	First baseman	
1958	Gil McDougald	New York Yankees	Second baseman	
1959	Gil Hodges^{†}	Los Angeles Dodgers	First baseman	
1960	Dick Groat	Pittsburgh Pirates	Shortstop	
1961	Warren Spahn^{†}	Milwaukee Braves	Pitcher	
1962	Robin Roberts^{†}	Baltimore Orioles	Pitcher	
1963	Bobby Richardson	New York Yankees	Second baseman	
1964	Ken Boyer	St. Louis Cardinals	Third baseman	
1965	Vern Law	Pittsburgh Pirates	Pitcher	
1966	Brooks Robinson^{†}	Baltimore Orioles	Third baseman	
1967	Ernie Banks^{†}	Chicago Cubs	First baseman	
1968	Al Kaline^{†}	Detroit Tigers	Outfielder	
1969	Pete Rose	Cincinnati Reds	Outfielder	
1970	Hank Aaron^{†}	Atlanta Braves	Outfielder	
1971	Harmon Killebrew^{†}	Minnesota Twins	Outfielder	
1972	Wes Parker	Los Angeles Dodgers	First baseman	
1973	Ron Santo^{†}	Chicago Cubs	Third baseman	
1974	Willie Stargell^{†}	Pittsburgh Pirates	First baseman	
1975	Johnny Bench^{†}	Cincinnati Reds	Catcher	
1976	Don Sutton^{†}	Los Angeles Dodgers	Pitcher	
1977	Lou Brock^{†}	St. Louis Cardinals	Outfielder	
1978	Don Kessinger	Chicago White Sox	Shortstop	
1979	Phil Niekro^{†}	Atlanta Braves	Pitcher	
1980	Tony Pérez^{†}	Boston Red Sox	First baseman	
1981	Tommy John	New York Yankees	Pitcher	
1982	Ron Cey	Los Angeles Dodgers	Third baseman	
1983	Mike Schmidt^{†}	Philadelphia Phillies	Third baseman	
1984	Steve Garvey	San Diego Padres	First baseman	
1985	Dale Murphy	Atlanta Braves	Outfielder	
1986	George Brett^{†}	Kansas City Royals	Third baseman	
1987	Rick Sutcliffe	Chicago Cubs	Pitcher	
1988	Buddy Bell	Houston Astros	Third baseman	
1989	Ozzie Smith^{†}	St. Louis Cardinals	Shortstop	
1990	Glenn Davis	Houston Astros	First baseman	
1991	Kent Hrbek	Minnesota Twins	First baseman	
1992	Cal Ripken Jr.^{†}	Baltimore Orioles	Shortstop	
1993	Don Mattingly	New York Yankees	First baseman	
1994	Barry Larkin^{†}	Cincinnati Reds	Shortstop	
1995	Curt Schilling	Philadelphia Phillies	Pitcher	
1996	Brett Butler	Los Angeles Dodgers	Outfielder	
1997	Paul Molitor^{†}	Minnesota Twins	Designated hitter	
1998	Tony Gwynn^{†}	San Diego Padres	Outfielder	
1999	Mark McGwire	St. Louis Cardinals	First baseman	
2000	Todd Stottlemyre	Arizona Diamondbacks	Pitcher	
2001	John Franco	New York Mets	Pitcher	
2002	Danny Graves	Cincinnati Reds	Pitcher	
2003	Jamie Moyer	Seattle Mariners	Pitcher	
2004	Jim Thome^{†}	Philadelphia Phillies	First baseman	
2005	John Smoltz^{†}	Atlanta Braves	Pitcher	
2006	Trevor Hoffman^{†}	San Diego Padres	Pitcher	
2007	Mike Timlin	Boston Red Sox	Pitcher	
2008	Shane Victorino	Philadelphia Phillies	Outfielder	
2009	Albert Pujols	St. Louis Cardinals	First baseman	
2010	Derek Jeter^{†}	New York Yankees	Shortstop	
2011	Ryan Zimmerman	Washington Nationals	Third baseman	
2012	Barry Zito	San Francisco Giants	Pitcher	
2013	Josh Hamilton	Los Angeles Angels	Outfielder	
2014	Adrián Beltré^{†}	Texas Rangers	Third baseman	
2015	Curtis Granderson	New York Mets	Outfielder	
2016	Jose Altuve^{‡}	Houston Astros	Second baseman	
2017	Joey Votto	Cincinnati Reds	First baseman	
2018	Corey Kluber	Cleveland Indians	Pitcher	
2019	Buster Posey	San Francisco Giants	Catcher	
2020	Stephen Piscotty	Oakland Athletics	Outfielder	
2021	Salvador Pérez^{‡}	Kansas City Royals	Catcher	
2022	Brandon Crawford	San Francisco Giants	Shortstop	
2023	Paul Goldschmidt^{‡}	St. Louis Cardinals	First baseman	
2024	Chris Sale^{‡}	Atlanta Braves	Pitcher	
2025	Bobby Witt Jr.^{‡}	Kansas City Royals	Shortstop	

== See also ==
- Roberto Clemente Award
- Players Choice Awards (The Marvin Miller Man of the Year Award)
- Branch Rickey Award
- Baseball awards
- List of Major League Baseball awards
