= Pat Pieper =

American baseball announcer (1886–1974)

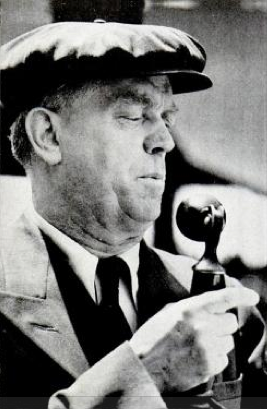
- Pieper in 1963
- Born: Frank Pieper; February 17, 1886; Hanover, Germany
- Died: October 22, 1974 (aged 88)
- Occupation: Baseball announcer
- Spouse: Karen Marie Jorgensen (m. 1918; died 1971)

Frank "Pat" Pieper (February 17, 1886 – October 22, 1974) was an American baseball announcer. He served as the Chicago Cubs field (public address) announcer from 1916 to 1974, a span of 59 years.

== Vendor at West Side Park ==
Pieper (pronounced "Piper") was born February 17, 1886, in Hanover, Germany. His family, including ten siblings, settled in Denver, Colorado. In 1904, 17-year-old Pat left for Chicago in search of a career. He was hired as a popcorn and peanut vendor by Dan Ryan, Sr., then the concessions boss at West Side Park, the home field of the Cubs. He later recalled that Ryan told him that "the first fifty years are the toughest. After that, it's easy."

By 1916, the Cubs had moved into Weeghman Park, soon to become known as Wrigley Field. The team did not bring along their field announcer, and Pieper talked himself into the job with Cub President Charles Weeghman.

Pieper also worked in the World Series of 1918, wherein the Cubs used Comiskey Park as home due to its greater capacity. There, he had the unusual task of announcing a pinch hitter for Babe Ruth, who was then a young pitcher for the Boston Red Sox. "The Babe," says Pieper, "was always tough for my Cubs."

== The Voice of Wrigley Field ==
Pieper first got to use an electronic public address system in 1932. "That saved my life," he said. "Before that, I had to run up and down the lines with my [14-pound] megaphone to make any kind of announcement. On some of those hot Wrigley Field days I’d lose six or eight pounds." As field announcer, he proclaimed the lineups, the current batter, defensive changes and so forth. He also introduced special guests and announced special events, such as births within the Cub "family."

On September 25, 1963, the retiring Stan Musial was named a Vice President of the St. Louis Cardinals just before he came to bat in the third inning at Wrigley. The next time that Musial batted, Pieper announced him with his new title. The Vice President struck out, then left the game for City Hall to be made an honorary citizen of Chicago.

Pieper's signature phrase at the beginning of each game was, "Attention! ... Attention, please! ... Have your pencil ... and scorecards ready ... and I'll give you... the correct lineup ... for today's ball game. The batt'ry ... for the [team]... [pitcher's name] ... and [catcher's name]." [and so on] He also would announce, "Play ball!" at the start of the game. In recent years, the Cubs have played a recording of that phrase to announce the starting lineups.

Between Pieper and current Philadelphia Phillies' public address announcer Dan Baker, the 2015 MLB season marked the 100th consecutive season that one of them has been announcing games. Baker has been the Phillies' PA announcer since 1972. The last game that was played without Pieper or Baker announcing games, was the 1915 World Series on October 13, 1915. Baker will be in his 55th season as Philadelphia's announcer in 2026.

== Witness to Diamond History ==
Pieper missed just 16 home games during his 59 years with the Cubs, and did not miss a game from 1924 onward. Hence, he witnessed virtually all of the great moments in Wrigley Field baseball history. He believed that his favorite moment came in 1917 "when our big left hander, Jim (Hippo) Vaughn, and Fred Toney, a right hander for Cincinnati pitched a double no-hitter for nine innings," Pieper recalled. "Somewhere at home I still have a picture of that great afternoon – a photograph of Vaughn, Toney and me."

"Don’t let anybody tell you the Babe [Ruth] didn’t point to the bleachers before he slammed that homer off Charlie Root," said Pieper, referring to The Called Shot of 1932. "I know. I had the best seat in the house ... I remember it as if it were yesterday. Guy Bush, one of our best pitchers was on the edge of the Cub dugout screaming ‘You big so and so, he's got two strikes on you. He’ll get you next time.’ Ruth stepped out of the batter's box. He definitely pointed toward center field where he planted Root's next pitch."

Pieper was on the job when Gabby Hartnett‘s Homer in the Gloamin' helped propel the Cubs to the 1938 National League pennant. "I have always attempted to handle my job as announcer with dignity," recalled Pieper. "But when I saw Gabby's hit soaring on its way over the left field fence, I picked up the bag of baseballs I keep for umpires and ran to third base to meet him. Then I jogged beside him until he reached home plate. You might say I brought Gabby home. I kept shouting, 'Be sure and touch the plate.' Gabby just smiled. I never saw a man so happy. I was 52 years old then. That was no way for me to behave."

Pieper names Rogers Hornsby as the greatest all-around player he'd seen. "He did everything well: hit, run, field. Hornsby wasn’t a flashy player, just a great who had his head jammed with baseball knowledge. He knew every hitter in the league. He played position on ‘em, and very frequently he was within six inches of where the ball was hit." Pieper regarded the Cubs infield of the 1930s, with Billy Jurges, Billy Herman and Phil Cavarretta, as more proficient than the legendary Tinker, Evers and Chance. "I pick them because the rabbit ball has made the job of the infielders much, much tougher than it was in 1906."

Pat Pieper had a small role in one of baseball history's weirdest plays. It took place during a game played on June 30, 1959, between the St. Louis Cardinals and Chicago Cubs. Stan Musial was at the plate, with a count of 3–1. Bob Anderson's next pitch was errant, evading catcher Sammy Taylor and rolling all the way to the backstop. Umpire Vic Delmore called ball four, however Anderson and Taylor contended that Musial foul tipped the ball. Because the ball was still in play, and because Delmore was embroiled in an argument with the catcher and pitcher, Musial took it upon himself to try for second base. Seeing that Musial was trying for second, third baseman Alvin Dark ran to the backstop to retrieve the ball. The ball wound up in the hands of Pieper, but Dark ended up getting it back anyway. Absentmindedly, however, Delmore pulled out a new ball and gave it to Taylor. Anderson finally noticed that Musial was trying for second, took the new ball, and threw it to second baseman Taylor. Anderson's throw flew over Tony Taylor's head into the outfield. Dark, at the same time that Anderson threw the new ball, threw the original ball to shortstop Ernie Banks. Musial, though, did not see Dark's throw and only noticed Anderson's ball fly over the second baseman's head, so he tried to go to third base. On his way there, he was tagged by Banks, and after a delay he was ruled out.

== Personal ==
The Cubs honored Pieper with a "day" on September 22, 1940, celebrating 25 years as field announcer, and again on September 13, 1953, in honor of his fifty years as a Cub employee. The latter occasion took place a day before Gene Baker and Ernie Banks joined—and thus integrated—the ballclub. In 1961, he got to throw out the first ball to open the season, after which he reported for work as customary, in his chair behind home plate, making the usual announcements and providing fresh baseballs to the plate umpire as needed. The Hall of Fame made a recording of Pieper's voice in 1966.

As Wrigley Field had no lighting system until 1988, all the Cubs home games were played in the daytime. After the games, Pieper would serve as a waiter at The Ivanhoe, a castle-themed north-side Chicago restaurant that opened in 1920 and featured turrets and drawbridges, and even had an adjoining theater. The Ivanhoe was at 3000 North Clark Street, about a mile south-southwest of Wrigley Field, and Pieper would typically walk there after a ball game.

Pieper met Karen Marie Jorgensen in 1910, and after what he called "a whirlwind courtship," married her in 1918. Karen didn't like to attend baseball games, although Pieper recalls that he once got her to stay for all of three innings. Karen died in 1971. They had no children.

A dedicated bowler, Pieper subbed for an absent player in the American Bowling Congress tournament in 1924. He threw three consecutive strikes before the absentee returned. He was a mainstay of the Cubs’ team, rolling alongside Andy Pafko, Billy Holm, Phil Cavarretta and Gabby Hartnett, often in tournaments organized by Ray Schalk. Pieper bowled a 200 game at age 80.

== Death ==
Pieper was taken ill after reporting for work at the ballpark on September 8, 1974. Suffering from acute jaundice, he was admitted to American Hospital, and died on October 22, 1974. In 1996, he was inducted into the Chicago Cubs Walk of Fame (which was later discontinued and reintroduced as the Chicago Cubs Hall of Fame in 2021).
