= Foul tip =

In baseball, a type of foul

In baseball, a foul tip is defined as "a batted ball that goes sharp and direct from the bat to the catcher and is legally caught. It is not a foul tip unless caught, and any foul tip that is caught is a strike and the ball is 'in play'."

A foul tip is not the same as a foul ball, although many people mistakenly use the term to refer to any pitch at which the batter swings and makes slight contact, regardless of whether it is caught by the catcher. However, the rules are very narrow: it is not a foul tip if the ball touches anything else on the way to the catcher's hand or glove or if it is not legally caught and held. Anything else is technically a foul ball, including if the ball is caught after popping up into foul territory.

The rules treat a foul tip as equivalent in every respect to a pitch at which the batter swings and misses.

- A foul tip is always a strike, meaning a player on two strikes is automatically out.
- The ball remains alive and runners may advance or be thrown out on the bases.

In contrast, a foul ball counts as a strike only if the batter does not already have two strikes against them, or if the batter incurred the foul ball on a bunt. Runners may not advance and must return to their bases without danger of being tagged out.
