= List of Major League Baseball Opening Day starting pitchers =

Major League Baseball (MLB) is the highest level of play in North American professional baseball, and is the organization that operates the National League and the American League. In 2000, the two leagues were officially disbanded as separate legal entities, and all of their rights and functions were consolidated in the commissioner's office. Since that time, MLB has operated as a single league, and constitutes one of the major professional sports leagues of the United States. It is composed of 30 teams.

Opening Day is the day on which professional baseball leagues begin their regular season. For MLB and most of the minor leagues, this day falls during the first week of April. For baseball fans, Opening Day serves as a symbol of rebirth; writer Thomas Boswell once penned a book titled, Why Time Begins On Opening Day. Many feel that the occasion represents a newness or a chance to forget last season, in that the 30 major league clubs and their millions of fans begin with 0-0 records.

Being named the Opening Day starter is an honor, which is often given to the player who is expected to lead the pitching staff that season. It is often given to the pitcher who had the best season the year prior, though there are various strategic reasons why a team's best pitcher might not start on Opening Day.

== National League ==
=== Eastern Division ===
==== Atlanta Braves ====
The Atlanta Braves National League franchise originated in Boston, Massachusetts in 1871. The team has played three different cities: Boston (1871–1952), Milwaukee, Wisconsin (1953–1965), and Atlanta, Georgia (1966–present).

==== Miami Marlins ====
The Marlins franchise entered the National League in 1993 as an expansion team, and was known as the Florida Marlins until 2011.

==== New York Mets ====
The successor to two previous National League franchises in New York City (the Giants and the Dodgers), the New York Mets have played in Queens since 1964, when they vacated the Polo Grounds in Manhattan and moved to Shea Stadium.

==== Philadelphia Phillies ====
The National League franchise in Philadelphia was established in 1883 following the dissolution of the Worcester Worcesters. The team adopted the Philadelphia Phillies name in 1884 and has used the moniker, and been located in the city, since that time.

==== Washington Nationals ====
The Washington Nationals franchise was established in Montreal, Quebec in 1969 as an expansion team, originally known as the Montreal Expos.

=== Central Division ===
==== Chicago Cubs ====
The Chicago Cubs franchise began as the Chicago White Stockings in 1876, with Albert Spalding as the franchise's inaugural manager.

==== Cincinnati Reds ====
Similar to their division counterparts, the Cincinnati Reds were established as the Cincinnati Red Stockings in 1882.

==== Milwaukee Brewers ====
Established in 1969 as the Pilots in Seattle, Washington, the team moved to Milwaukee, Wisconsin the following season, which brought top-flight baseball back to Wisconsin for the first time since the Braves departed after the 1965 season. The Brewers have been members of the National League since 1998; prior to that, the team played as a member of the American League Central Division.

==== Pittsburgh Pirates ====
The Pittsburgh Pirates joined the National League in 1887 after five seasons as members of the American Association.

==== St. Louis Cardinals ====
The St. Louis Cardinals were originally established in 1882 as the St. Louis Browns.

=== Western Division ===
==== Arizona Diamondbacks ====
The Arizona Diamondbacks entered the National League as an expansion team in 1998.

==== Colorado Rockies ====
The Colorado Rockies entered the National League as an expansion team in 1993.

==== Los Angeles Dodgers ====
The Los Angeles Dodgers began play in 1884 as the Brooklyn Atlantics and were known by several nicknames before adopting the Dodgers name in 1932.

==== San Diego Padres ====
The San Diego Padres joined Major League Baseball as an expansion team in 1969.

==== San Francisco Giants ====
The San Francisco Giants were originally established as the New York Gothams in 1883.

== American League ==
=== Eastern Division ===
==== Baltimore Orioles ====
The Baltimore Orioles franchise was established in 1901 in Milwaukee, Wisconsin as the "Milwaukee Brewers".

==== Boston Red Sox ====
The Boston Red Sox of Boston, Massachusetts, began in 1901 as the Americans and adopted the Red Sox name in 1908.

==== New York Yankees ====
The franchise currently known as the New York Yankees was originally established in 1901 as the Baltimore Orioles (unrelated to their current divisional rivals). After moving to New York City in 1903 and adopting the name New York Highlanders, the team was renamed the Yankees in 1913.

==== Tampa Bay Rays ====
The Tampa Bay Rays, originally named the Devil Rays, joined Major League Baseball at its last expansion in 1998.

==== Toronto Blue Jays ====
Since 2005, the Toronto Blue Jays, established in 1977, are the only team in Major League Baseball based outside of the United States.

=== Central Division ===
==== Chicago White Sox ====
The Chicago White Sox were established in 1901.

==== Cleveland Guardians ====
The team now known as the Cleveland Guardians has played under several monikers since its inception in 1901, including the Cleveland Blues or Bluebirds, the Cleveland Bronchos, the Cleveland Naps, and the Cleveland Indians.

==== Detroit Tigers ====
The Detroit Tigers were founded as members of the Western League in 1894.

==== Kansas City Royals ====
The Kansas City Royals were added to the American League in a 1969 expansion after the city's first Major League Baseball franchise departed for Oakland, California.

==== Minnesota Twins ====
The Minnesota franchise began its life as the Washington Senators in Washington, D. C., where they played from their inception in 1901 to 1960.

=== Western Division ===
==== Houston Astros ====
The city of Houston, Texas was awarded an expansion franchise in the National League in 1962 after the dissolution of the Continental League. The team, which began play as the Colt .45s, changed its name to the Houston Astros in 1965.

==== Los Angeles Angels ====
Playing under various names such as the California Angels, the Anaheim Angels and the Los Angeles Angels of Anaheim, the Los Angeles Angels have been members of the American League since 1961.

==== Oakland Athletics ====
While the Oakland Athletics have played under the same name since their establishment in 1901, the team has played in three different locations under that moniker. The franchise was initially based in Philadelphia, Pennsylvania.

==== Seattle Mariners ====
The Seattle Mariners franchise was established in 1977, the successor to the earlier Pilots team that moved to Milwaukee, Wisconsin.

==== Texas Rangers ====
When the Minnesota Twins moved to Minneapolis for the 1961 season, a new Washington Senators team was established in the United States capital as an expansion franchise.

== 2026 Opening Day starting pitchers ==
Team	Starting pitcher	No. of starts	Ref.
Arizona Diamondbacks	Zac Gallen	4	
Athletics	Luis Severino	3	
Atlanta Braves	Chris Sale	7	
Baltimore Orioles	Trevor Rogers	1	
Boston Red Sox	Garrett Crochet	3	
Chicago Cubs	Matthew Boyd	3	
Chicago White Sox	Shane Smith	1	
Cincinnati Reds	Andrew Abbott	1	
Cleveland Guardians	Tanner Bibee	1	
Colorado Rockies	Kyle Freeland	5	
Detroit Tigers	Tarik Skubal	3	
Houston Astros	Hunter Brown	1	
Kansas City Royals	Cole Ragans	3	
Los Angeles Angels	José Soriano	1	
Los Angeles Dodgers	Yoshinobu Yamamoto	2	
Miami Marlins	Sandy Alcántara	6	
Milwaukee Brewers	Jacob Misiorowski	1	
Minnesota Twins	Joe Ryan	2	
New York Mets	Freddy Peralta	3	
New York Yankees	Max Fried	4	
Philadelphia Phillies	Cristopher Sánchez	1	
Pittsburgh Pirates	Paul Skenes	2	
St. Louis Cardinals	Matthew Liberatore	1	
San Diego Padres	Nick Pivetta	1	
San Francisco Giants	Logan Webb	5	
Seattle Mariners	Logan Gilbert	2	
Tampa Bay Rays	Drew Rasmussen	1	
Texas Rangers	Nathan Eovaldi	6	
Toronto Blue Jays	Kevin Gausman	3	
Washington Nationals	Cade Cavalli	1	
