= List of Major League Baseball first-round draft picks =

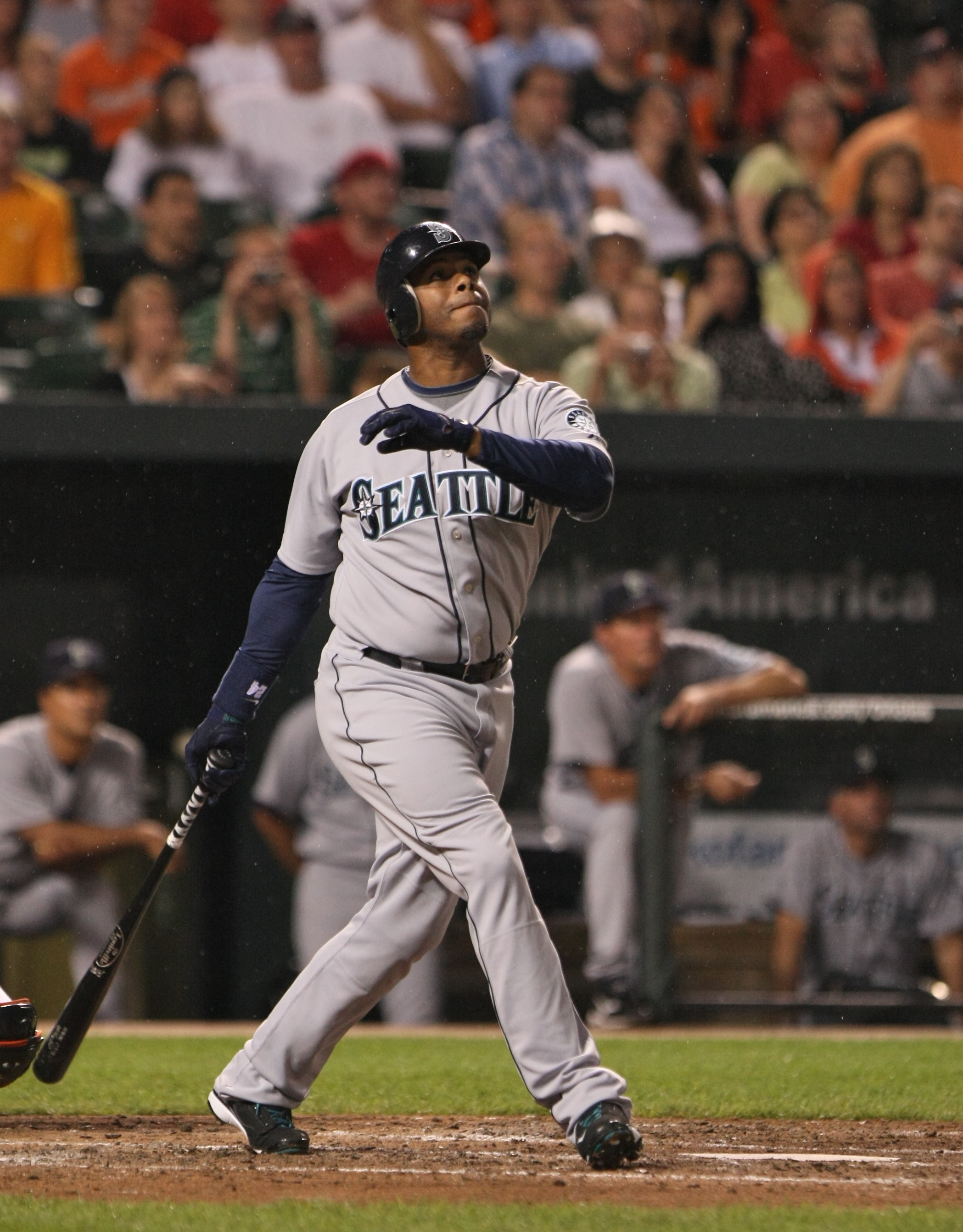
Ken Griffey Jr., the 1987 first round pick of the Seattle Mariners

Major League Baseball (MLB) is the highest level of play in North American professional baseball, and is the organization that operates the National League and the American League. In 2000, the two leagues were officially disbanded as separate legal entities, and all of their rights and functions were consolidated in the commissioner's office. Since that time, MLB has operated as a single league, and constitutes one of the major professional sports leagues of the United States. It is composed of 30 teams.

The First-Year Player Draft, also known as the Rule 4 Draft, is MLB primary mechanism for assigning amateur baseball players from high schools, colleges, and other amateur baseball clubs to its teams. The first draft took place in 1965; it was introduced to prevent richer teams from negotiating wealthier contracts with top-level prospects and therefore, monopolizing the player market. Originally, three drafts were held each year. The first draft took place in June and involved high-school graduates and college seniors who had just finished their seasons. The second draft took place in January for high school and college players who had graduated in December. The third draft took place in August and was for players who participated in American amateur summer leagues. The August draft was eliminated after two years, and the January draft lasted until 1986.

The draft order is determined based on the previous season's standings, with the team possessing the worst record receiving the first pick. In addition, teams that lost free agents in the previous off-season may be awarded "compensatory" picks.

== National League ==
=== Eastern Division ===
==== Atlanta Braves ====
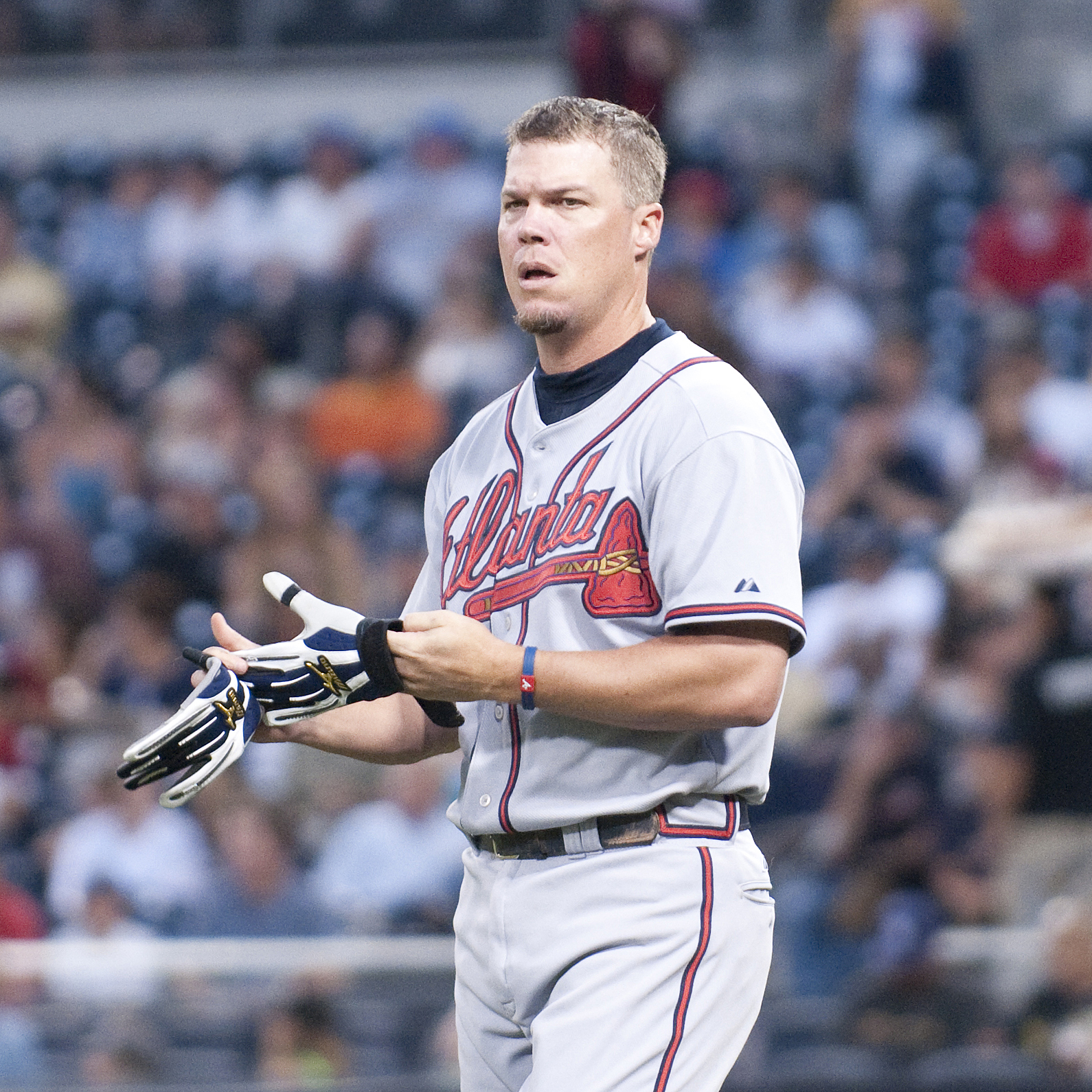
Chipper Jones won the National League MVP Award in 1999, four years after winning a World Series ring.

The Atlanta Braves National League franchise originated in Boston, Massachusetts in 1871. The team has played in three different cities: Boston (1871–1952), Milwaukee, Wisconsin (1953–1965), and Atlanta, Georgia (1966–present). Since the establishment of the draft in 1965, the Braves have selected 55 players in the first round. Of those 55 players, the Braves have selected 26 pitchers, eight outfielders, seven shortstops, five catchers, four third basemen, three first basemen, and two second basemen. Four of these players, Kent Mercker, Steve Avery, Chipper Jones, and Mike Kelly, were part of the 1995 World Series championship team. The team's 1974 selection, Dale Murphy, won consecutive National League Most Valuable Player Awards (NL MVP) in 1982 and 1983, the Lou Gehrig Memorial Award in 1985, and the Roberto Clemente Award in 1988. Bob Horner, the Braves' 1978 selection, won the National League Rookie of the Year Award in the same year. Chipper Jones, drafted by the Braves in 1990, won the NL MVP Award in 1999. The Braves have held the first overall pick twice; in 1978 they used it to select Horner, and in 1990 they chose Chipper Jones.

==== Miami Marlins ====
The Marlins franchise entered the National League in 1993 as an expansion team, and was known as the Florida Marlins until 2011. Of the 24 players picked by the Marlins in the first round, 13 have been pitchers. Four outfielders were selected and two players each were taken at first base, third base, and catcher. The Marlins have also drafted one shortstop in the first round, though they have never taken a second baseman. Two of the Marlins' first-round picks have won championships with the franchise. Charles Johnson (1992) won a World Series title on the 1997 championship team and Josh Beckett (1999) won with the 2003 team.

==== New York Mets ====
The successor to two previous National League franchises in New York City (the Giants and the Dodgers), the New York Mets have played in Queens since 1964, when they vacated the Polo Grounds in Manhattan and moved to Shea Stadium.

==== Philadelphia Phillies ====
The National League franchise in Philadelphia was established in 1883 following the dissolution of the Worcester Worcesters. The team adopted the Philadelphia Phillies name in 1884 and has used the moniker, and been located in the city, since that time.

==== Washington Nationals ====
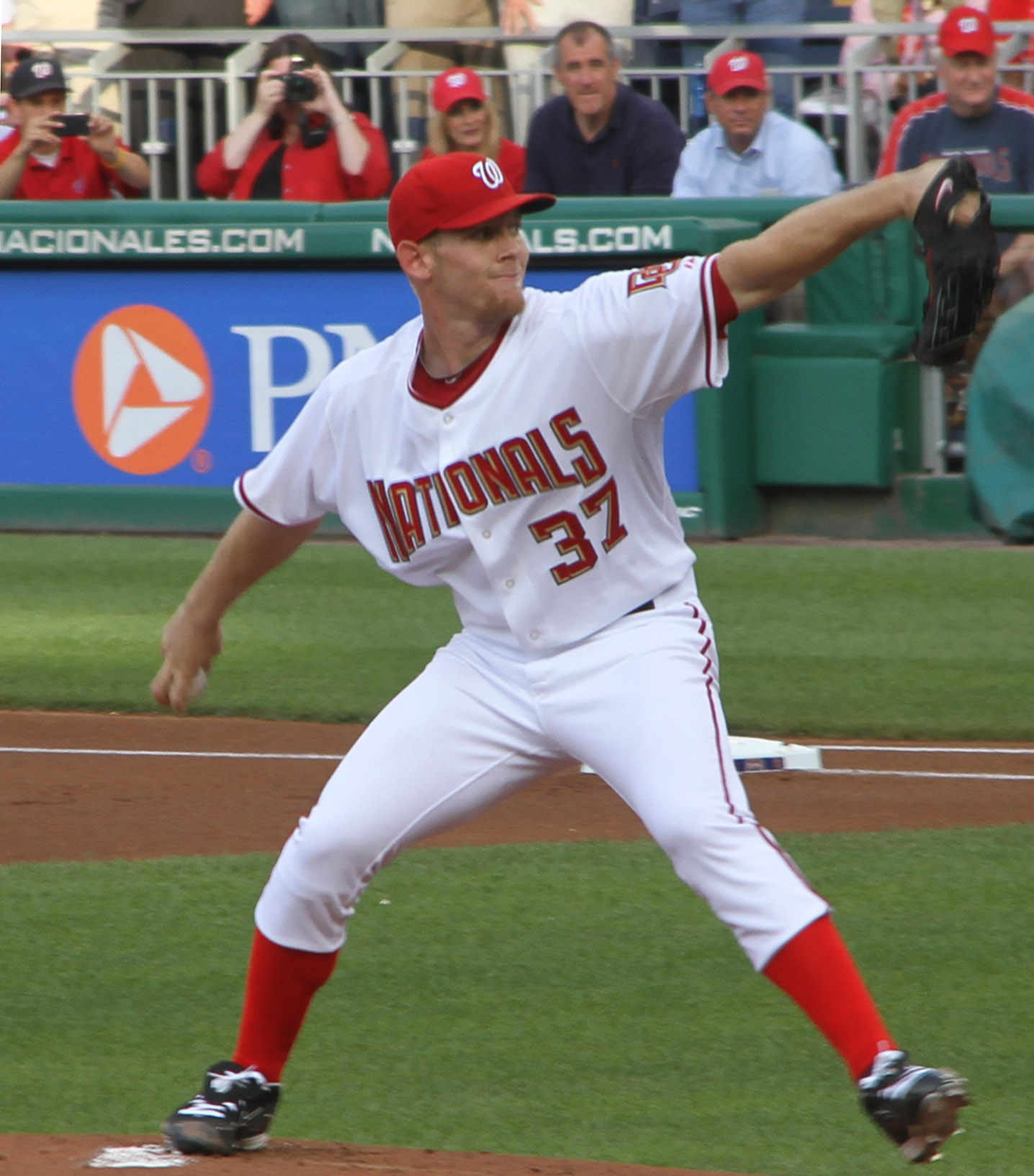
Stephen Strasburg (2009) is considered to be one of the greatest pitching prospects in the history of the draft.

The Washington Nationals franchise was established in Montreal, Quebec in 1969 as an expansion team, originally known as the Montreal Expos. Since the institution of MLB's Rule 4 Draft, the Expos/Nationals have selected 66 players in the first round. Thirty-two have been pitchers, the most of any position; 22 of them were right-handed, while 10 were left-handed. Thirteen outfielders, nine shortstops, five third basemen, four catchers, and three first basemen were also taken.

=== Central Division ===
==== Chicago Cubs ====
The Chicago Cubs franchise began as the Chicago White Stockings in 1876, with Albert Spalding as the franchise's inaugural manager.

==== Cincinnati Reds ====
Similar to their division counterparts, the Cincinnati Reds were established as the Cincinnati Red Stockings in 1882.

==== Milwaukee Brewers ====
Established in 1969 as the Pilots in Seattle, Washington, the team moved to Milwaukee, Wisconsin the following season, which brought top-flight baseball back to Wisconsin for the first time since the Braves departed after the 1965 season. The Brewers have been members of the National League since 1998; prior to that, the team played as a member of the American League Central Division.

==== Pittsburgh Pirates ====
The Pittsburgh Pirates joined the National League in 1887 after five seasons as members of the American Association.

==== St. Louis Cardinals ====
The St. Louis Cardinals were originally established in 1882 as the St. Louis Browns.

=== Western Division ===
==== Arizona Diamondbacks ====
The Arizona Diamondbacks entered the National League as an expansion team in 1998.

==== Colorado Rockies ====
The Colorado Rockies entered the National League as an expansion team in 1993.

==== Los Angeles Dodgers ====
The Los Angeles Dodgers began play in 1884 as the Brooklyn Atlantics and were known by several nicknames before adopting the Dodgers name in 1932.

==== San Diego Padres ====
The San Diego Padres joined Major League Baseball as an expansion team in 1969.

==== San Francisco Giants ====
The San Francisco Giants were originally established as the New York Gothams in 1883.

== American League ==
=== Eastern Division ===
==== Baltimore Orioles ====
The Baltimore Orioles franchise was established in 1901 in Milwaukee, Wisconsin as the "Milwaukee Brewers".

==== Boston Red Sox ====
The Boston Red Sox of Boston, Massachusetts, began in 1901 as the Americans and adopted the Red Sox name in 1908.

==== New York Yankees ====
The franchise currently known as the New York Yankees was originally established in 1901 as the Baltimore Orioles (unrelated to their current divisional rivals). After moving to New York City in 1903 and adopting the name New York Highlanders, the team was renamed the Yankees in 1913.

==== Tampa Bay Rays ====
The Tampa Bay Rays, originally named the Devil Rays, joined Major League Baseball at its last expansion in 1998.

==== Toronto Blue Jays ====
Since 2005, the Toronto Blue Jays, established in 1977, are the only team in Major League Baseball based outside of the United States.

=== Central Division ===
==== Chicago White Sox ====
The Chicago White Sox were established in 1901.

==== Cleveland Guardians ====
The team now known as the Cleveland Guardians has played under several monikers since its inception in 1901, including the Cleveland Blues or Bluebirds, the Cleveland Bronchos, the Cleveland Naps, and the Cleveland Indians.

==== Detroit Tigers ====
The Detroit Tigers were founded as members of the Western League in 1894].

==== Kansas City Royals ====
The Kansas City Royals were added to the American League in a 1969 expansion after the city's first Major League Baseball franchise departed for Oakland, California.

==== Minnesota Twins ====
The Minnesota franchise began its life as the Washington Senators in Washington, D. C., where they played from their inception in 1901 to 1960.

=== Western Division ===
==== Houston Astros ====
The city of Houston, Texas was awarded an expansion franchise in the National League in 1962 after the dissolution of the Continental League. The team, which began play as the Colt .45s, changed its name to the Houston Astros in 1965.

==== Los Angeles Angels ====
Playing under various names such as the Los Angeles Angels of Anaheim, California Angels, and Anaheim Angels, the Los Angeles Angels have been members of the American League since 1961.

==== Oakland Athletics ====
While the Oakland Athletics have played under the same name since their establishment in 1901, the team has played in three different locations under that moniker. The franchise was initially based in Philadelphia, Pennsylvania.

==== Seattle Mariners ====
The Seattle Mariners franchise was established in 1977, the successor to the earlier Pilots team that moved to Milwaukee, Wisconsin.

==== Texas Rangers ====
When the Minnesota Twins moved to Minneapolis for the 1961 season, a new Washington Senators team was established in the United States capital as an expansion franchise.

== See also ==
- List of first overall Major League Baseball draft picks
