= 1977 Major League Baseball expansion =

Addition of the Seattle Mariners and Toronto Blue Jays

Locations of teams for the 1976 American League season
West East
Locations of teams for the 1977–1981 American League seasons
West East

The 1977 Major League Baseball expansion resulted in the establishment of expansion franchises in Seattle and Toronto in the American League of Major League Baseball. The Seattle Mariners and Toronto Blue Jays began play in the 1977 season, becoming the 25th and 26th teams in Major League Baseball.

Seattle and Toronto were included in a list of potential expansion cities in a survey conducted by the American League in 1960. The others were Atlanta, Buffalo, Dallas–Fort Worth, Denver, Oakland, and San Diego (all of which received MLB franchises eventually through expansion or relocation except Buffalo, which has a AAA team in the Blue Jays system.)

== Seattle ==
In the 1969 Major League Baseball expansion (which had been originally planned to take place in 1971, but the date was moved up two years when Senator Stuart Symington of Missouri demanded that a new team be placed in Kansas City at the earliest possible convenience after the Kansas City Athletics relocated to Oakland), Kansas City, Montreal, San Diego, and Seattle were each granted franchises; the Kansas City Royals and Seattle Pilots were added to the American League, while the Montreal Expos (now the Washington Nationals) and San Diego Padres joined the National League. The Seattle Pilots only played one season, during which they faced financial difficulties stemming from a complete lack of television coverage, a poorly performing team, a stadium with problems, and the highest ticket and concession prices in the league. Owners of other American League teams wanted Dewey Soriano and William R. Daley to sell the team to a Seattle owner who would improve the team and address issues at Sick's Stadium, particularly uncovered seats with bad views. After several attempts to sell the team to a Seattle owner failed, on April 1, 1970, judge Sidney Volinn declared the team officially bankrupt; it was sold to Milwaukee car dealer (and future MLB commissioner) Bud Selig, who moved the team to there and renamed it the Milwaukee Brewers, who began play a week later on April 7. Selig had negotiated a deal for the purchase with Soriano during Game 1 of the 1969 World Series.

As a result of the relocation of the Seattle Pilots to Milwaukee, in 1970 the city of Seattle, King County and the state of Washington sued the American League for breach of contract. The $32.5 million lawsuit proceeded until 1976, when at trial the American League offered the city a franchise in exchange for the city, county, and state to drop the suit. On November 2, 1972, King County had broken ground on the Kingdome, which would come to be used by the Seattle Mariners for baseball and by the Seahawks for football.

On January 15, 1976, the expansion franchise was approved, becoming the 13th franchise in the American League. It was owned by Lester Smith and Danny Kaye, who paid an expansion fee of US$6.5 million. Owing to the history surrounding the franchise, sportswriter Emmett Watson of the Seattle Post-Intelligencer joked that the team should be named the Seattle Litigants.

== Toronto ==
Toronto had a long history of interest in baseball. Its first professional baseball team was established in 1885, and in 1886 Sunlight Park was built to host its games. In 1897, Hanlan's Point Stadium was built at the Toronto Islands for the Toronto Maple Leafs of the International League, and on September 5, 1914 it was the site of baseball legend Babe Ruth's first professional home run and only minor league home run. In 1926, Maple Leaf Stadium was built for the Toronto Maple Leafs. The team was successful, sometimes drawing more fans than established Major League Baseball teams. The team was owned by Jack Kent Cooke, who in the mid-1950s sought municipal financing of a major league baseball park on the grounds of the Canadian National Exhibition. He was also involved in the failed attempt to establish the Continental League as a third league in Major League Baseball in the early 1960s. Maple Leaf Stadium was demolished in 1968 after the Toronto Maple Leafs were sold to Walter Dilbeck and moved to Louisville, Kentucky. (The team has since relocated twice, and is now the Worcester Red Sox.)

In the early 1970s, Toronto City Council alderman Paul Godfrey proposed a plan for a publicly financed domed stadium in the city, but it was opposed by taxpayers and amateur sports groups. Undeterred, he proposed renovation of Exhibition Stadium to support baseball. The stadium was renovated in anticipation of the city being awarded a Major League Baseball team, costing CA$15 million. Half of the funds were provided by the municipal government, and the other half from an interest-free loan from the provincial Government of Ontario. Its seating capacity was increased to 40,000.

There had been strong interest from several groups and individuals to own a Major League Baseball team in the city. The most prominent was Labatt Brewing Company, who wanted to use ownership of a sports team as a means to establish a visible presence in the Toronto market.

On January 9, 1976, the National Exhibition Company, owners of the San Francisco Giants, established an agreement in principle to sell the franchise to a consortium owned by Labatt Brewing Company, Vulcan Assets, and the Canadian Imperial Bank of Commerce for CA$13,250,000 (equivalent to $71,276,527 in 2025. The Giants had failed to repay a US$500,000 loan from Major League Baseball, and had experienced declining revenues since the relocation of the Kansas City Athletics to Oakland in 1968. Of the sale price, US$5,250,000 was to be placed in escrow to "meet certain possible obligations with respect to the transaction", especially the lease of Candlestick Park, which would expire in 1994.

The new owners of the Giants, led by Don McDougall, would move the team to Toronto pending approval from the other eleven National League teams, which would be sought on January 14 at the Winter Meetings of General managers in Phoenix. The team would be known as the Toronto Giants and would begin play during the 1976 Major League Baseball season. The deal was scuttled by a Superior Court of California, which issued an injunction blocking the sale on February 11, 1976; the injunction was requested by the city of San Francisco on January 10. The National Exhibition Company eventually accepted a purchase proposal from Bob Lurie in a deal brokered by George Moscone, the Mayor of San Francisco; Lurie elected to keep the team in San Francisco. This was the third scuttled attempt by Labatt to bring an MLB team to Toronto, after failures to acquire the Baltimore Orioles and the Cleveland Indians. Soon after, Godfrey received a phone call from Kansas City Royals owner Ewing Kauffman informing him that he supported a Toronto franchise for the American League.

During an owners meeting held on March 20, 1976, the American League franchises voted 11-1 to expand the league with a Toronto franchise, to which National League owners resolved to consider a Toronto franchise to begin play in the 1977 season. Bowie Kuhn, at the time the Commissioner of Baseball, planned for the National League to expand with new franchises in Toronto and Washington, D.C., and for the American League to add a new franchise in New Orleans in addition to the already-awarded Seattle franchise. On March 29, National League owners met and voted in favour of the expansion plans, but they were rejected because the vote was not unanimous, with dissenting votes from the owners of the Cincinnati Reds and Philadelphia Phillies. A subsequent vote on April 26 ended this plan with a 7–5 result in favour of the proposal, again failing to achieve unanimity.

Two groups bid for the rights to franchise ownership in the city, which presented bids during an American League owner's meeting on March 26, 1976. Ultimately, an ownership group named Metro Baseball Ltd. consisting of Labatt Brewing Company, the Canadian Imperial Bank of Commerce, and Imperial Trust won the bid for a franchise fee of CA$7 million. The other bid was made by Atlantic Packaging. The winning bid was represented by legal counsel Herb Solway and Gord Kirke. Kirke prepared the original documents which led to the foundation of the team in 1976.

After the city was awarded the franchise, U.S. President Gerald Ford attempted to pressure Major League Baseball to instead award the franchise to Washington, D.C., which he claimed should have a team before Toronto. Both the American League and National League dismissed his request.

In 1974, the Toronto City Council approved a further CA$2.8 million for renovations to Exhibition Stadium, retrofitting the stadium for baseball and would be ready in time for the 1977 season. Paul Beeston was hired as the team's first employee on May 10, 1976, and Peter Bavasi was hired as the team's first president and general manager on June 18, 1976.

== Expansion draft ==
In order to stock the roster of each team, a draft was held on November 5, 1976 in which each of the extant teams would make available to the expansion franchises some of the players on their major league and minor league rosters. Each team was allowed to protect fifteen players on the major league roster, and an additional three players after each of the first and second round of the draft. The Seattle Mariners and Toronto Blue Jays each selected 30 players in the draft.

== See also ==
- 1961 Major League Baseball expansion
- 1962 Major League Baseball expansion
- 1969 Major League Baseball expansion
- 1993 Major League Baseball expansion
- 1998 Major League Baseball expansion
