= Rebel league =

The term rebel league has been used to characterize several sports leagues including:

- All-America Football Conference
- American Basketball Association
- American Basketball League (1961–63)
- American Football League
- Continental League
- Indian Cricket League
- Mexican Baseball League
- United States Football League
- World Football League
- World Hockey Association
