= 1969 Major League Baseball expansion =

The 1969 Major League Baseball expansion resulted in the establishment of expansion franchises in Kansas City and Seattle in the American League and in Montreal and San Diego in the National League of Major League Baseball (MLB). The Kansas City Royals, Montreal Expos, San Diego Padres, and the Seattle Pilots began play in the 1969 season. One of the reasons for expansion was increasing pressure to maintain the sport as the US national pastime, particularly because of the increasing popularity of professional football.

As a result of expansion, the American and National Leagues reorganized. Each league was split into two divisions, forming the American League East, American League West, National League East, and National League West.

Other candidate cities that were considered in 1967 included Buffalo, Dallas–Fort Worth, and Milwaukee. The latter two were rejected because they were close to cities that already had an MLB team (Houston and Chicago, respectively). In May 1966, Commissioner of Baseball William Eckert stated that cities that should be considered for expansion included Milwaukee (the Milwaukee Braves had moved to Atlanta before the 1966 season), New Orleans, Oakland, San Diego, Seattle, and Toronto, and that expansion would occur in "eight to 10 years;" he subsequently stated that the leagues could expand "any time after two years". By August, MLB had plans to expand to two 12-team leagues by 1970, and had squelched the possibility of a third league, such as the Continental League proposed in 1959 or the proposal made in August 1968 by Ron Plaza consisting of an Eastern, Central, and Western League.

Locations of teams for the 1968 American League season
American League
Locations of teams for the 1966–1968 National League seasons
National League
Locations of teams for the 1969 American League season
West East
Locations of teams for the 1969 National League season
West East

== American League ==
In 1960, the American League conducted a survey to determine potential expansion cities. The list included Atlanta, Buffalo, Dallas–Fort Worth, Denver, Oakland, San Diego, Seattle, and Toronto.

=== Kansas City Royals ===
Kansas City had been the home to the Kansas City Athletics from 1955, when the team moved from Philadelphia, to 1967, after which the team moved to Oakland. For several years, owner Charlie Finley had threatened to leave the city: in May and September 1962 to Dallas–Fort Worth; in January 1964 he signed a contract with the state of Kentucky to move the team to Louisville and rename the team Kentucky Athletics; and in February 1964 he wanted to move the team to Oakland. A committee of American League owners denied his requests.

In October 1967, with the team's lease at Municipal Stadium expired, Finley once again proposed to move the franchise to Oakland, this time at the owners' meetings in Chicago. During the first ballot of the committee of American League owners on October 18, he received six supporting votes, one opposing vote (from the Baltimore Orioles), and the Cleveland Indians, New York Yankees, and Washington Senators abstained from voting. American League president Joe Cronin requested a second ballot, in which the New York Yankees were the only team to change their status, opting to support the move and giving Finley "the seven votes necessary to move the team". In a press release, Cronin announced the move and promised to expand the league by two more clubs no later than 1971. The Oakland Athletics began play in the 1968 Major League Baseball season.

Cronin conveyed the news to Kansas City mayor Ilus Davis and Stuart Symington, a US Senator from Missouri. Cronin had thought that the compromise to install a new team by 1971 would be acceptable to them as compensation for the loss of the Athletics. Instead, Symington threatened to challenge Major League Baseball's antitrust exemption with federal legislation, and to also challenge the reserve clause. Davis threatened a lawsuit to block the move. Tom Yawkey arranged a meeting of the owners still at the convention, during which the league agreed to accelerate the expansion process and assured that Kansas City would be granted a new franchise to begin play no later than the 1969 season. This would require another franchise to be established at the same time to ensure the league had an even number of teams for a balanced schedule.

On the floor of the United States Senate on October 19, Symington described Finley as "one of the most disreputable characters ever to enter the American sports scene" and said that "Oakland is the luckiest city since Hiroshima".

Ewing Kauffman won rights to the franchise, and paid a $5.5 million expansion fee for the Royals, which played games at Municipal Stadium until the end of the 1972 season, after which the team moved to Royals Stadium, now known as Kauffman Stadium.

=== Seattle Pilots ===
By the 1960s, with Seattle's population growing, the city became the largest to host a Pacific Coast League team, the Seattle Rainiers. The league's stature also declined with the move of the Brooklyn Dodgers to Los Angeles and the New York Giants to San Francisco, which caused those cities' PCL teams to relocate to much smaller markets. In 1964, the city purchased Sick's Stadium for $1.1 million. In 1965, the Rainiers were sold to the Los Angeles Angels, who renamed the team the Seattle Angels.

The city made several attempts to lure a Major League Baseball team. In 1964, William R. Daley visited the city when searching for a new home for the Cleveland Indians. He was unimpressed with the stadium, citing it as the primary reason to terminate his quest to move his team. Charlie Finley also found the stadium inadequate during a 1967 visit, and so rejected Seattle as a potential target for moving the Kansas City Athletics.

Because of this, the city instead tried to lobby for an expansion franchise at the 1967 owners' meetings in Chicago. The delegation also had support from two US Senators, Henry M. Jackson and Warren Magnuson, the latter of whom was the chairman of the Senate Commerce Committee, a committee which has "jurisdiction over the major league's business activities". Coupled with Symington's threats related to the move of the Kansas City Athletics, the political influence swayed the American League owners. However, they were reluctant to expand in 1969 without a Seattle stadium bond issue. The Seattle delegation assured the owners that Sick's Stadium could be renovated in five months to fulfill the minimum requirements until a new stadium was built; with this, the owners agreed to a 1969 expansion, and approved teams in Kansas City and Seattle.

On December 1, 1967 at the Winter Meetings in Mexico City, the franchise was officially awarded to Pacific Northwest Sports, which received $5.5 million in funding from Daley, who thus had 47% ownership of the venture. Other owners included Max and Dewey Soriano. The award was contingent on renovation of Sick's Stadium to increase its seating capacity from 11,000 to 30,000 by the start of the 1969 season. The Sorianos persuaded notable athletes to advocate for the $40 million King County stadium bond issue, including baseball players Mickey Mantle, Carl Yastrzemski, and Joe DiMaggio, and football player Y. A. Tittle; the bond issue was approved by 62.3% of the electorate.

== National League ==
The National League had received applications for an expansion franchise from Buffalo, Dallas–Fort Worth, Milwaukee, Montreal, San Diego, and Toronto as well as an informal bid from Denver.

=== Montreal Expos ===
Montreal had a long history of interest in baseball. The sport became increasingly popular in eastern North America in the 1850s and 1860s, and Montreal "became a special hotbed", so much so that by the early 1860s Montreal authorities banned play in city parks and streets for public safety.

Minor league baseball became a presence in the city. In 1946, the Montreal Royals, a Triple-A team affiliated with the Brooklyn Dodgers of Major League Baseball, became the first team having any affiliation to MLB to break baseball's color barrier. Jackie Robinson, who had been signed to a contract by Branch Rickey in late 1945, played the entire season for the International League team. He and teammates Roy Partlow and Johnny Wright were the first black players in the league since the 1880s. The next year, Robinson became the first black player to play for a Major League Baseball team. In 1951 in Farnham, a town east of Montreal, Sam Bankhead became the first black manager in Minor League Baseball; he was a player-manager for the Farnham Pirates of the Provincial League that year.

Montreal City Councilor Gerry Snyder spoke to Ford C. Frick sometime after the 1962 Major League Baseball expansion, during which he was told Montreal would not receive an expansion franchise unless it had a stadium in which to contest matches. At the Winter Meetings in Mexico City on December 2, 1967, Snyder presented a proposal to Major League Baseball owners to establish a franchise in the city. Several influential owners pledged their support for a Montreal franchise in that meeting, including Walter O'Malley, Roy Hofheinz, and John Galbreath. Certain that Hofheinz would object to a Dallas–Fort Worth bid and that the San Diego bid was near certain to be successful, Snyder deemed a bid from Buffalo to be the strongest bid against which to compete.

On May 27, 1968, the National League officially awarded a franchise to Montreal to commence play in the 1969 season. National League president Warren Giles had encouraged the owners during the meeting, stating "If we're going to expand, let's really spread it out". The Montreal Expos became the first franchise to be awarded to a city outside the United States. When the news reached the U.S. Congress, members collectively condemned the decision.

Because of the slow pace of progress in meeting commitments, Jean-Louis Lévesque withdrew his financial support in the franchise on July 31, 1968. Snyder quickly found another investor, Charles Bronfman, and the team met the deadline of 15 August for the initial $1.1 million installment, before which Jarry Park was selected as the team's stadium for the short term. Renovations to the park were made by adding uncovered bleacher seats along the right and left field lines, and an electronic scoreboard installed beyond right field. The team had some issues committing to a new stadium, as required by the franchise award, and it was said that the team had agreed to build a dome at the Autostade and use it as their stadium if a new stadium was not built by 1970. It had originally intended to lease the stadium and expand its seating capacity from 26,000 to 37,000, but then chose Jarry Park instead.

The ownership group paid $12.5 million for the team. John McHale was hired as the team's first president, and Jim Fanning its first general manager. Many names had been considered for the team, including Royals which had a strong association with the city, but the name had already been adopted by the new Kansas City franchise. After rejecting various options, including "Voyageurs" and "Nationals", the name Expos was chosen in honour of Expo 67 and because it was the same in both of the city's official languages. McHale stated that the name would "help Montreal be identified properly as the city that gave the world Expo 67".

The New York Daily mistakenly reported that Buffalo had been awarded a franchise instead of Montreal.

=== San Diego Padres ===
In 1967, C. Arnholt Smith, owner of the PCL San Diego Padres (PCL), won a bid for an expansion team in the National League for the 1969 season. On May 27, 1968, the National League officially awarded a franchise to San Diego to commence play in the 1969 season for a fee of $12.5 million for the team. After the 1968 PCL season, Smith surrendered the franchise, which moved to Eugene, Oregon, and transferred the Padre name to his new NL team, the San Diego Padres. Eddie Leishman was named general manager of the MLB Padres, with club president and minority investor Buzzie Bavasi, formerly GM of the Los Angeles Dodgers (having resigned to take the new role), playing a dominant role in its baseball operations as president of the team.

== Expansion draft ==
In order to stock the roster of each team, a draft was held in which each of the extant teams would make available to the expansion franchises some of the players on their major league and minor league rosters. Each expansion team selected 30 players in the draft, and each of the extant teams lost six players. The extant teams were allowed to protect 15 players in their organization from the draft. After each player lost, another three players could be protected. The extant teams were not informed of the draft selections of the expansion teams until the draft was complete.

On October 14, 1968, the Montreal Expos and San Diego Padres drafted players exclusively from National League teams. The draft was conducted from the Windsor Hotel in Montreal, in which four rooms were reserved: one for the Expos, one for the Padres, one for the remaining 10 teams, and one in which draft selections were made. The Padres won a coin flip, and so had the first selection, which they used to draft Ollie Brown from the San Francisco Giants. Montreal's first selection was Pittsburgh Pirates utility player Manny Mota. Selections were made by general manager Jim Fanning and manager Gene Mauch for Montreal, and general manager Buzzie Bavasi and manager Preston Gómez for San Diego.

On October 15, the Kansas City Royals and Seattle Pilots drafted players exclusively from American League teams. The draft was conducted in Boston, at the Sheraton Hotel.

== Aftermath ==
Because Buffalo was not awarded an expansion franchise, Erie County legislators reconsidered a $50 million bond issue that was to be used for the construction of a domed stadium for baseball and football. The applicants that submitted a bid for Dallas–Fort Worth claimed that Roy Hofheinz, owner of the Houston Astros, had blocked their bid in order to preserve Houston's radio and television broadcast revenue. Chicago White Sox owner Arthur Allyn, Jr. complained about his team being in the same division as two expansion franchises.

The addition of four teams resulted in the reconfiguration of the leagues; each was split into an east and a west division. The American League announced its realignment into two divisions on 28 May 1968, beginning in the 1969 season; the American League East would consist of the Baltimore Orioles, Boston Red Sox, Cleveland Indians, Detroit Tigers, New York Yankees and Washington Senators, and the American League West would consist of the California Angels, Chicago White Sox, Kansas City Royals, Minnesota Twins, Oakland Athletics, and Seattle Pilots. The National League originally resisted a divisional split, with its president Warren Giles citing "the tradition and history of baseball". By July 10, the National League owners had agreed to a divisional split, in which the National League East would consist of the Chicago Cubs, Montreal Expos, New York Mets, Philadelphia Phillies, Pittsburgh Pirates, and St. Louis Cardinals, and the National League West would consist of the Atlanta Braves, Cincinnati Reds, Houston Astros, Los Angeles Dodgers, San Diego Padres, and San Francisco Giants.

Game scheduling issues had to be resolved; league-wide, there would be 1,944 games compared to 1,620 for the 1968 Major League Baseball season. The American League had considered decreasing the number of games played by each team to 152 or 156 from 162 that had been played each season since 1961, and the National League either 162 or 165 games, but the leagues agreed to a 162-game schedule in a meeting on 10 July 1968. Each team would play 18 games against every other team in their own division, and 12 games against each league opponent in the other division. A best-of-five post-season playoff series between league division winners was also introduced.

The Kansas City Royals have been the most successful of the four 1969 expansion teams. The franchise fielded competitive teams in the 1970s and 1980s and won the 1985 World Series. After a 29-year postseason drought, the Royals returned to postseason play in the 2014 season, before winning their second World Series title in 2015.

The San Diego Padres had nine consecutive losing seasons, and have since made the playoffs seven times. A potential sale and relocation to Washington for the 1974 season was averted when, while the sale was tied up in legal action, Ray Kroc (who had just retired from his position as McDonald's CEO) bought the team and kept them in San Diego. The Padres twice made the World Series in 1984 and 1998, but lost both appearances.

The Montreal Expos had good attendance for the 1969 season, and after having losing records for ten years, were competitive in the 1980s and early 1990s. Its 1994 season put it in first place before the 1994–95 Major League Baseball strike prematurely ended the season. The team's fortunes declined thereafter, and the team moved to Washington, D.C. for the 2005 season, becoming the Washington Nationals. The franchise won its first playoff series in 1981 when the Expos defeated the Phillies in the NLDS, after a split-season. As the Nationals, the franchise won the NLDS in 2019, over the Los Angeles Dodgers. They went onto sweep the St. Louis Cardinals in their first ever NLCS, and defeat the Houston Astros (moved to the AL prior to the 2013 season) to win the franchise's first World Series title.

The Seattle Pilots fared the worst of the four expansion franchises, playing only in the 1969 season. The team performed poorly on the field, and faced financial difficulties owing to no television coverage, a stadium with problems, and the highest ticket and concession prices in the league. Owners of other American League teams wanted Soriano and Daley to sell the team to a Seattle owner who would improve the team and address issues at Sick's Stadium, particularly uncovered seats with bad views. After several attempts to sell the team to a Seattle owner failed, on April 1, 1970, Judge Sidney Volinn declared the team officially bankrupt; it was sold to Bud Selig, who moved the team to Milwaukee and renamed it the Milwaukee Brewers. Selig had negotiated a deal for the purchase with Soriano during Game 1 of the 1969 World Series. As a result of the relocation, in 1970 the city of Seattle, King County, and the state of Washington sued the American League for breach of contract. The $32.5 million lawsuit was settled in 1976 when the American League offered the city a franchise in exchange for termination of the lawsuit. This led to the establishment of the Seattle Mariners via the 1977 Major League Baseball expansion. As for the Brewers, the franchise played in the American League until the 1997 season, after which they moved to the National League during the 1998 expansion. The Brewers only qualified for the postseason twice while in the American League, making the 1982 World Series, but have fared much better in the National League, reaching the postseason ten times since 2008 and won the 2026 World Series.

== See also ==
- 1961 Major League Baseball expansion
- 1962 Major League Baseball expansion
- 1977 Major League Baseball expansion
- 1993 Major League Baseball expansion
- 1998 Major League Baseball expansion
