= 1961 Major League Baseball season =

1961 MLB season
- League: American League (AL); National League (NL)
- Sport: Baseball
- Duration: Regular season: April 10 – October 1, 1961 (AL); April 11 – October 1, 1961 (NL); World Series: October 4–9, 1961
- Games: 162 (AL); 154 (NL)
- Teams: 18 total: 10 (AL); 8 (NL)
- TV partner(s): NBC, CBS, ABC

Regular season
- Season MVP: AL: Roger Maris (NYY); NL: Frank Robinson (CIN)
- AL champions: New York Yankees
- AL runners-up: Detroit Tigers
- NL champions: Cincinnati Reds
- NL runners-up: Los Angeles Dodgers

World Series
- Champions: New York Yankees
- Runners-up: Cincinnati Reds
- World Series MVP: Whitey Ford (NYY)

MLB seasons
- ← 1960 1962 →

Locations of teams for the 1961 American League season
American League
Locations of teams for the 1960–1961 National League seasons
National League

The 1961 major league baseball season began on April 10, 1961. The regular season ended on October 1, with the Cincinnati Reds and New York Yankees as the regular season champions of the National League and American League, respectively. The postseason began with Game 1 of the 58th World Series on October 4 and ended with Game 5 on October 9. In the second iteration of this World Series matchup, the Yankees defeated the Reds, four games to one, capturing their 19th championship in franchise history, since their previous in 1958. The season is best known for Yankee teammates Roger Maris' and Mickey Mantle's pursuit of Babe Ruth's prestigious 34-year-old single-season home run record of 60. Maris ultimately broke the record when he hit his 61st home run on the final day of the regular season, while Mantle was forced out of the lineup in late September due to a hip infection and finished with 54 home runs. Going into the season, the defending World Series champions were the Pittsburgh Pirates from the 1960 season.

For the third year, there were two separate All-Star Games played. The first, the 30th All-Star Game, was held on July 11 at Candlestick Park in San Francisco, California, home of the San Francisco Giants. The National League won, 5–4. The second, the 31st All-Star Game, was held on July 31 at Fenway Park in Boston, Massachusetts, home of the Boston Red Sox. The game ended in a 1–1 tie, due to a rainout following the end of the ninth inning.

In response to the proposed Continental League, the American League expanded by two teams in the first MLB expansion since 1901, ushering in the expansion era. The original Washington Senators moved to the Minneapolis–Saint Paul metropolitan area in Minnesota and became the Minnesota Twins, being the sixth team since 1953 to relocate, and the third of American League teams since then. The American League therefore placed a new team in Washington, D.C., also called the Washington Senators. Also, the American League placed a team in Los Angeles called the Los Angeles Angels.

== Schedule ==
The 1961 schedule was the first time that the American and National Leagues did not follow the same scheduling format. Due to expansion of the American League, the AL schedule consisted of 162 games for all 10 teams. Each team was scheduled to play 18 games against the other nine teams. Meanwhile, the National League, still consisting of eight teams, continued the 154-game format in place since the 1904 season (except for 1919). Each team was scheduled to play 22 games against the other seven teams. 1961 would mark the last 154-game season in professional baseball history, as the National League itself would copy the American League 162-game format following their own expansion the following season.

American League Opening Day took place on April 10, featuring the Chicago White Sox and newly enfranchised Washington Senators, while National League Opening Day took place the following day, featuring all eight teams. The final day of the regular season was on October 1 and saw sixteen teams play. The World Series took place between October 4 and October 9.

== Rule changes ==
The 1961 season saw the following rule changes:

- A sacrifice fly is no longer limited to fair balls.
- A rule preventing leagues of all levels of major and minor league baseball from drafting college players during a school year was implemented.

== Teams ==
League	Team	City	Ballpark	Capacity	Manager
American League	Baltimore Orioles	Baltimore, Maryland	Baltimore Memorial Stadium	49,375	Paul Richards
American League	Baltimore Orioles	Baltimore, Maryland	Baltimore Memorial Stadium	49,375	Lum Harris
American League	Boston Red Sox	Boston, Massachusetts	Fenway Park	33,357	Pinky Higgins
American League	Chicago White Sox	Chicago, Illinois	Comiskey Park	46,550	Al López
American League	Cleveland Indians	Cleveland, Ohio	Cleveland Stadium	73,811	Jimmy Dykes
American League	Cleveland Indians	Cleveland, Ohio	Cleveland Stadium	73,811	Mel Harder
American League	Detroit Tigers	Detroit, Michigan	Tiger Stadium	52,904	Bob Scheffing
American League	Kansas City Athletics	Kansas City, Missouri	Municipal Stadium	34,165	Joe Gordon
American League	Kansas City Athletics	Kansas City, Missouri	Municipal Stadium	34,165	Hank Bauer
American League	Los Angeles Angels	Los Angeles, California	Wrigley Field (Los Angeles)	20,457	Bill Rigney
American League	Minnesota Twins	Bloomington, Minnesota	Metropolitan Stadium	30,022	Cookie Lavagetto
American League	Minnesota Twins	Bloomington, Minnesota	Metropolitan Stadium	30,022	Sam Mele
American League	New York Yankees	New York, New York	Yankee Stadium	67,337	Ralph Houk
American League	Washington Senators	Washington, D.C.	Griffith Stadium	27,500	Mickey Vernon
National League	Chicago Cubs	Chicago, Illinois	Wrigley Field (Chicago)	36,755	College of Coaches
National League	Cincinnati Reds	Cincinnati, Ohio	Crosley Field	30,322	Fred Hutchinson
National League	Los Angeles Dodgers	Los Angeles, California	Los Angeles Memorial Coliseum	94,600	Walter Alston
National League	Milwaukee Braves	Milwaukee, Wisconsin	Milwaukee County Stadium	43,768	Chuck Dressen
National League	Milwaukee Braves	Milwaukee, Wisconsin	Milwaukee County Stadium	43,768	Birdie Tebbetts
National League	Philadelphia Phillies	Philadelphia, Pennsylvania	Connie Mack Stadium	33,608	Gene Mauch
National League	Pittsburgh Pirates	Pittsburgh, Pennsylvania	Forbes Field	35,500	Danny Murtaugh
National League	San Francisco Giants	San Francisco, California	Candlestick Park	42,553	Alvin Dark
National League	St. Louis Cardinals	St. Louis, Missouri	Busch Stadium	30,500	Solly Hemus
National League	St. Louis Cardinals	St. Louis, Missouri	Busch Stadium	30,500	Johnny Keane

== Standings ==
=== American League ===
American League
Team	W	L	Pct.	GB	Home	Road
New York Yankees	109	53	.673	—	65‍–‍16	44‍–‍37
Detroit Tigers	101	61	.623	8	50‍–‍31	51‍–‍30
Baltimore Orioles	95	67	.586	14	48‍–‍33	47‍–‍34
Chicago White Sox	86	76	.531	23	53‍–‍28	33‍–‍48
Cleveland Indians	78	83	.484	30½	40‍–‍41	38‍–‍42
Boston Red Sox	76	86	.469	33	50‍–‍31	26‍–‍55
Minnesota Twins	70	90	.438	38	36‍–‍44	34‍–‍46
Los Angeles Angels	70	91	.435	38½	46‍–‍36	24‍–‍55
Kansas City Athletics	61	100	.379	47½	33‍–‍47	28‍–‍53
Washington Senators	61	100	.379	47½	33‍–‍46	28‍–‍54

=== National League ===
National League
Team	W	L	Pct.	GB	Home	Road
Cincinnati Reds	93	61	.604	—	47‍–‍30	46‍–‍31
Los Angeles Dodgers	89	65	.578	4	45‍–‍32	44‍–‍33
San Francisco Giants	85	69	.552	8	45‍–‍32	40‍–‍37
Milwaukee Braves	83	71	.539	10	45‍–‍32	38‍–‍39
St. Louis Cardinals	80	74	.519	13	48‍–‍29	32‍–‍45
Pittsburgh Pirates	75	79	.487	18	38‍–‍39	37‍–‍40
Chicago Cubs	64	90	.416	29	40‍–‍37	24‍–‍53
Philadelphia Phillies	47	107	.305	46	22‍–‍55	25‍–‍52

=== Tie games ===
7 tie games (4 in AL, 3 in NL), which are not factored into winning percentage or games behind (and were often replayed again) occurred throughout the season.

==== American League ====
The Baltimore Orioles, Boston Red Sox, Chicago White Sox, Detroit Tigers, Kansas City Athletics, Los Angeles Angels, Minnesota Twins, and New York Yankees had one each.

- April 22 (game 2), Baltimore Orioles vs. New York Yankees, tied at 5 after a shortened seven innings on account of rain, following a 32 minute rain delay.
- June 1, Detroit Tigers vs. Kansas City Athletics, tied at 4 after a shortened eight innings on account of rain.
- June 8 (game 2), Boston Red Sox vs. Los Angeles Angels, tied at 4 after 11 innings due to rain following a 51 minute rain delay. Game called at 1:18 a.m.
- September 5, Minnesota Twins vs. Chicago White Sox, tied at 3 after nine innings due to fog.

==== National League ====
The Chicago Cubs had two tie games. The Milwaukee Braves, Philadelphia Phillies, San Francisco Giants, St. Louis Cardinals had one each.

- June 6 (game 2), St. Louis Cardinals vs. Chicago Cubs, tied at 3 after 10 innings on account of 12:50 a.m. curfew.
- June 28, Philadelphia Phillies vs. San Francisco Giants, tied at 7 after 15 innings on account of 12:50 a.m. curfew.
- August 2 (game 2), Chicago Cubs vs. Milwaukee Braves, tied at 7 after 11 innings on account of darkness. Game rescheduled to September 3.

== Postseason ==
The postseason began on October 4 and ended on October 9 with the New York Yankees defeating the Cincinnati Reds in the 1961 World Series in five games.

=== Bracket ===
World Series
AL	New York Yankees	4
NL	Cincinnati Reds	1

== Managerial changes ==
=== Off-season ===
Team	Former Manager	New Manager
Chicago Cubs	Lou Boudreau	College of Coaches
Detroit Tigers	Joe Gordon	Bob Scheffing
Kansas City Athletics	Bob Elliott	Joe Gordon
Los Angeles Angels	Team enfranchised	Bill Rigney
New York Yankees	Casey Stengel	Ralph Houk
San Francisco Giants	Tom Sheehan	Alvin Dark
Washington Senators	Team enfranchised	Mickey Vernon

=== In-season ===
Team	Former Manager	New Manager
Baltimore Orioles	Paul Richards	Lum Harris
Cleveland Indians	Jimmy Dykes	Mel Harder
Kansas City Athletics	Joe Gordon	Hank Bauer
Milwaukee Braves	Chuck Dressen	Birdie Tebbetts
Minnesota Twins	Cookie Lavagetto	Sam Mele
St. Louis Cardinals	Solly Hemus	Johnny Keane

== League leaders ==
=== American League ===
Hitting leaders
Stat	Player	Total
AVG	Norm Cash (DET)	.361
OPS	Norm Cash (DET)	1.148
HR	Roger Maris (NYY)	61
RBI	Jim Gentile (BAL); Roger Maris (NYY)	141
R	Roger Maris (NYY)	132
H	Norm Cash (DET)	193
SB	Luis Aparicio (CWS)	53

Pitching leaders
Stat	Player	Total
W	Whitey Ford (NYY)	25
L	Pedro Ramos (MIN)	20
ERA	Dick Donovan (WAS)	2.40
K	Camilo Pascual (MIN)	221
IP	Whitey Ford (NYY)	283.0
SV	Luis Arroyo (NYY)	29
WHIP	Dick Donovan (WAS)	1.026

=== National League ===
Hitting leaders
Stat	Player	Total
AVG	Roberto Clemente (PIT)	.351
OPS	Frank Robinson (CIN)	1.015
HR	Orlando Cepeda (SF)	46
RBI	Orlando Cepeda (SF)	142
R	Willie Mays (SF)	129
H	Vada Pinson (CIN)	208
SB	Maury Wills (LAD)	35

Pitching leaders
Stat	Player	Total
W	Joey Jay (CIN); Warren Spahn (MIL)	21
L	Bob Friend (PIT); Art Mahaffey (PHI)	19
ERA	Warren Spahn (MIL)	3.02
K	Sandy Koufax (LAD)	269
IP	Lew Burdette (MIL)	272.1
SV	Roy Face (PIT); Stu Miller (SF)	17
WHIP	Warren Spahn (MIL)	1.142

== Milestones ==
=== Batters ===
==== Four home runs in one game ====
- Willie Mays (SF):
  - Became the ninth player to hit four home runs in one game in a 14–4 win against the Milwaukee Braves on April 30.

==== Cycles ====
- Ken Boyer (STL):
  - Boyer hit for his first cycle and 12th in franchise history, in game two of a doubleheader on September 14 against the Chicago Cubs.

==== Other batting accomplishments ====
- Jim Gentile (BAL):
  - Became the fourth player to hit two grand slams in a single game, in a 13–5 win over the Minnesota Twins on May 9.
- Eddie Mathews / Hank Aaron / Joe Adcock / Frank Thomas (MIL):
  - Became the first group of players to hit four consecutive home runs in the seventh inning on June 8 against the Cincinnati Reds.
- Roger Maris (NYY):
  - Tied an American League record by becoming the fourth player to hit home runs in six consecutive games between August 11 and 16.
  - Set a Major League record for single-season home runs at 61 on the last day of the season on October 1, breaking Babe Ruth's 34-year-old major league single-season record of 60, set in 1927. Maris' record would stand for 37 years until it was broken by Mark McGwire's 70 in 1998. Maris' American League record would stand for a total of 61 years until it was eclipsed by Aaron Judge's 62 in 2022.
- Orlando Cepeda / Felipe Alou / Jim Davenport / Willie Mays / John Orsino (SF):
  - Become the third group of players in Major League history to hit five home runs in one inning in the ninth inning against the Cincinnati Reds on August 23.

=== Pitchers ===
==== No-hitters ====
- Warren Spahn (MIL):
  - Spahn threw his second career no-hitter and 11th no-hitter in franchise history, by defeating the San Francisco Giants 1–0 on April 28. Wilson walked two and struck out five.

==== Other pitching accomplishments ====
- Warren Spahn (MIL):
  - Became the 13th member of the 300-win club, defeating the Chicago Cubs on August 11, winning 2–1.

=== Miscellaneous ===
- Philadelphia Phillies:
  - Lost their 23rd consecutive game in game one of a doubleheader on August 20 to the Milwaukee Braves, breaking the modern (1901–present) major league record for most consecutive losses that was set by the Boston Americans in 1906 and Philadelphia Athletics in both 1916 and 1943.
  - Lost their 20th consecutive game on August 17 to the Milwaukee Braves, breaking the modern National League record for most consecutive losses that was set by the Boston Beaneaters in 1906.

== Awards and honors ==
=== Regular season ===
Baseball Writers' Association of America Awards
BBWAA Award	National League	American League
Rookie of the Year	Billy Williams (CHC)	Don Schwall (BOS)
Cy Young Award	—	Whitey Ford (NYY)
Most Valuable Player	Frank Robinson (CIN)	Roger Maris (NYY)
Babe Ruth Award (World Series MVP)	—	Whitey Ford (NYY)
Gold Glove Awards
Position	National League	American League
Pitcher	Bobby Shantz (PIT)	Frank Lary (DET)
Catcher	John Roseboro (LAD)	Earl Battey (MIN)
1st Base	Bill White (STL)	Vic Power (CLE)
2nd Base	Bill Mazeroski (PIT)	Bobby Richardson (NYY)
3rd Base	Ken Boyer (STL)	Brooks Robinson (BAL)
Shortstop	Maury Wills (LAD)	Luis Aparicio (CWS)
Outfield	Vada Pinson (CIN)	Jim Landis (CWS)
Outfield	Roberto Clemente (PIT)	Al Kaline (DET)
Outfield	Willie Mays (SF)	Jimmy Piersall (CLE)

=== Other awards ===
- Sport Magazine's World Series Most Valuable Player Award: Whitey Ford (NYY)

The Sporting News Awards
Award	National League	American League
Player of the Year	—	Roger Maris (NYY)
Pitcher of the Year	Warren Spahn (MIL)	Whitey Ford (NYY)
Fireman of the Year (Relief pitcher)	Stu Miller (SF)	Luis Arroyo (NYY)
Rookie of the Year (Player)	Billy Williams (CHC)	Dick Howser (KCA)
Rookie of the Year (Pitcher)	Ken Hunt (CIN)	Don Schwall (BOS)
Manager of the Year	—	Ralph Houk (NYY)
Executive of the Year	—	Dan Topping (NYY)

=== Monthly awards ===
==== Player of the Month ====
Month	National League
May	Joey Jay (CIN)
June	George Altman (CHC)
July	Frank Robinson (CIN)
August	Warren Spahn (MIL)
September	Jim O'Toole (CIN)

=== Baseball Hall of Fame ===
- Max Carey
- Billy Hamilton

== Home field attendance ==
Team name	Wins	%±	Home attendance	%±	Per game
Los Angeles Dodgers	89	8.5%	1,804,250	−19.9%	23,432
New York Yankees	109	12.4%	1,747,725	7.4%	21,577
Detroit Tigers	101	42.3%	1,600,710	37.1%	19,521
San Francisco Giants	85	7.6%	1,390,679	−22.5%	18,061
Minnesota Twins	70	−4.1%	1,256,723	69.0%	15,515
Pittsburgh Pirates	75	−21.1%	1,199,128	−29.7%	15,573
Chicago White Sox	86	−1.1%	1,146,019	−30.3%	14,148
Cincinnati Reds	93	38.8%	1,117,603	68.4%	14,514
Milwaukee Braves	83	−5.7%	1,101,441	−26.5%	14,304
Baltimore Orioles	95	6.7%	951,089	−19.9%	11,599
St. Louis Cardinals	80	−7.0%	855,305	−22.0%	10,965
Boston Red Sox	76	16.9%	850,589	−24.7%	10,373
Cleveland Indians	78	2.6%	725,547	−23.7%	8,957
Kansas City Athletics	61	5.2%	683,817	−11.8%	8,548
Chicago Cubs	64	6.7%	673,057	−16.9%	8,629
Los Angeles Angels	70		603,510		7,360
Washington Senators	61		597,287		7,561
Philadelphia Phillies	47	−20.3%	590,039	−31.6%	7,565

== Venues ==
The 1961 season saw two new teams in the American League, and with it, one new venue and one returning venue:

- The Los Angeles Angels played their first and only season at Wrigley Field. Their final game was on October 1 against the Cleveland Indians, moving into Dodger Stadium (referred to as "Chavez Ravine Stadium" when the Angels played) for the start of the 1962 season.
- The Washington Senators played their first and only season at Griffith Stadium, the longtime home of the original AL Washington Senators. Their final game was on September 21 against the Minnesota Twins, moving into District of Columbia Stadium for the start of the 1962 season.

The Minnesota Twins, newly relocated from their long-time home in Washington, D.C. as the Washington Senators, leave Griffith Stadium after playing there for 50 seasons, moving into Metropolitan Stadium where they would play for 21 seasons through 1981.

Briggs Stadium, home of the Detroit Tigers, is renamed to Tiger Stadium.

The Los Angeles Dodgers would play their final game at Los Angeles Memorial Coliseum on September 20 against the Chicago Cubs, moving into Dodger Stadium for the start of the 1962 season.

== Media ==
=== Television ===
CBS and NBC continued to air weekend Game of the Week broadcasts, while ABC televised several games in prime time. One of ABC's prime time games occurred as Roger Maris was poised to tie and subsequently break Babe Ruth's regular season home run record of 60. As with all MLB games in those days, the action was totally blacked out of major league markets. As a matter of fact, as documented in the HBO film 61*, the Maris family was welcomed into ABC's Kansas City, Missouri affiliate KMBC-TV so they could watch the in-house feed of the game, which was blacked out of Kansas City.

The All-Star Game and World Series aired on NBC.

== See also ==
- 1961 in baseball (Events, Births, Deaths)
- 1961 Nippon Professional Baseball season
