= Expansion team =

Sports team added after the founding of its league

An expansion team is a new team in a sports league, usually from a city that has not hosted a team in that league before, formed with the intention of satisfying the demand for a local team from a population in a new area. Sporting leagues also hope that the expansion of their competition will grow the popularity of the sport generally. The term is most commonly used in reference to the North American major professional sports leagues but is applied to sports leagues in other countries with a closed franchise system of league membership. The term refers to the expansion of the sport into new areas. The addition of an expansion team sometimes results in the payment of an expansion fee to the league by the new team and an expansion draft to populate the new roster.

== Background ==
=== Reasons for expansion ===
In North America, expansion often takes place in response to population growth and geographic shifts of population. Such demographic change results in financial opportunities to engage with the new market as consumers of sports demand local teams to support. Major League Baseball (MLB) was limited to 16 teams located north and east of St. Louis, Missouri, for the first half of the 20th century. During that time, the United States population doubled and expanded to the south and west. Rival interests explored the possibility of forming a rival league in the untapped markets. To forestall that possibility, one of the measures that MLB took was to expand by four teams in 1961 and 1962. Over the past four decades, MLB expanded further, to its current 30-team membership. In the context of MLB, the term "expansion team" is also used to refer to any of the 14 teams enfranchised in the second half of the 20th century.

Leagues that are new and/or financially struggling may also admit large numbers of expansion teams so that the existing franchises can pocket more revenue from expansion fees. Indoor American football leagues are notorious for doing so: the leagues can double the number of teams and have many new teams fail within a year or two. Major League Soccer, after spending most of its first decade of existence with relatively stable membership and struggling finances, adopted a policy of continuous expansion beginning in 2005, a policy that the league as of 2017 has no intention of stopping.

=== Locations for expansion teams ===
Cities and regions with large populations that lack a team are generally regarded to be the best candidates for new teams. In rugby league, the United Kingdom-based Rugby Football League's Super League has added teams from France and Wales to cover a great demographic spread. The operator of Super League, England's Rugby Football League, has also added teams to the lower levels of its league pyramid, specifically the Championship and League 1, from both France and Wales, and most recently Canada. In rugby union, the competition originally known as the Celtic League and now as Pro14, which began with sides only from the Celtic nations of Ireland, Scotland, and Wales, has added teams from Italy and more recently South Africa. The U.S.-based NFL has considered a potential franchise in the UK.

=== Performance of expansion teams ===
When an expansion team begins play, it is generally stocked with less talented free agents, inexperienced players, and veterans nearing retirement. Additionally, prospective owners may face expensive fees to the league as well as high startup costs such as stadiums and facilities. The team is also at a disadvantage in that it has not been together as a team as long as its opponents and thus lacks the cohesiveness other teams have built over years. As a result, most expansion teams are known for their poor play during their first seasons. Expansion teams must also compete with any expansion rivals for available talent, a common problem since leagues often expand by two or four teams in one season.

Expansion teams are not necessarily doomed to mediocrity, however, as most leagues have policies which promote parity, such as drafts and salary caps, which give some expansion teams the opportunity to win championships only a few years after their first season. In Major League Baseball (MLB) The Arizona Diamondbacks won the 2001 World Series in their fourth season, and the Florida Marlins won the 1997 World Series in their fifth season. In the NBA, The Milwaukee Bucks won the 1971 NBA Finals in their third year of existence, greatly helped by drafting Kareem Abdul-Jabbar in the 1969 draft and acquiring Oscar Robertson from the Cincinnati Royals before the 1970–71 season began. In the NHL, the Florida Panthers made the Stanley Cup Final in their third season even though, like MLB, the league then had no salary cap; a cap was established in 2005. However, the Vegas Golden Knights quickly emerged as one of the NHL's best teams in its first season. Thanks to a less-harsh expansion draft and successful management, the team defied all odds and advanced to the 2018 Stanley Cup Final in their first year of existence, and later won the 2023 Stanley Cup Final in just their sixth season.

The National Football League (NFL), despite being considered the most generous in its revenue sharing and the strictest with its salary cap, has had far more difficulty bringing expansion teams up to par with their more established brethren. Of the six teams to have been added to the NFL since the AFL–NFL merger, the fastest turnaround between an inaugural season and the team's first Super Bowl victory was 27 seasons (the Tampa Bay Buccaneers, established in 1976, won Super Bowl XXXVII in the 2002 season); none of the four teams to hold expansion drafts since 1995 (Note: While the Baltimore Ravens are officially considered an expansion franchise that began play in 1996, they did not stock their roster with an expansion draft, instead taking on the contracts of the former Cleveland Browns players, while the Browns suspended operations for three seasons. The Ravens later won the Super Bowl in their 5th and 17th seasons of existence. Conversely, when the Browns returned to the NFL in 1999, while not an expansion franchise, their initial roster was stocked by an expansion draft and they were given the top pick in the 1999 NFL draft. The Browns have not appeared in the Super Bowl since returning to the league.) have ever won that contest, with only one, the Carolina Panthers (who reached the game in their 9th and 21st seasons of existence) playing in the game. In 1996, the Panthers and Jacksonville Jaguars each made it to their respective conference championship games in their second season in the league.

=== Relocated teams regarded as expansion teams ===
Expansion teams are usually considered as such in their first season and sometimes in their second season. A team that moves to another location and/or changes its name is not an expansion team. If it moves, it is known as a relocated team, and if the name changes, the team is known as a renamed team. Relocated teams may change their name, colors, and mascot at the same time as the move; however, because the roster is the same and the league does not expand as a result, they are not regarded as expansion teams. A handful of franchise relocations are officially recognized by their respective leagues as creation of expansion franchises; this is done so that the history of the team stays with the original city, to be assumed a few years later by a revival of the franchise after a period of inactivity. The league expands in the season corresponding to the original franchise's revival, and holds an expansion draft for the revived franchise. For examples, see the notes below on the NFL's Baltimore Ravens (relocated in 1996 from the Cleveland Browns, which were revived in 1999), NBA's New Orleans Pelicans (relocated in 2002 from the Charlotte Hornets, which were revived in 2004 and were initially named the Charlotte Bobcats), and NHL's Utah Mammoth (relocated from the Arizona Coyotes in 2024, revival of the Coyotes expected in 2029).

== Expansion teams in North America ==
=== Major League Baseball (MLB) ===
The National League had an eight-team lineup established in 1900, mirrored by the eight charter franchises of the American League in 1901. This list enumerates franchises added since this "Classic Eight" era.

- 1961: Los Angeles Angels; Washington Senators (now Texas Rangers)
- 1962: Houston Colt .45s (now Houston Astros); New York Mets
- 1969: Kansas City Royals; Montreal Expos (now Washington Nationals); San Diego Padres; Seattle Pilots (now Milwaukee Brewers)
- 1977: Seattle Mariners; Toronto Blue Jays
- 1993: Colorado Rockies; Florida Marlins (now Miami Marlins)
- 1998: Arizona Diamondbacks; Tampa Bay Devil Rays (now Tampa Bay Rays)

=== National Basketball Association (NBA) ===
Eight charter franchises of the NBA (founded in 1950 via merger of the BAA and NBL) are still active.

- 1961: Chicago Packers (now Washington Wizards)
- 1966: Chicago Bulls
- 1967: San Diego Rockets (now Houston Rockets); Seattle SuperSonics (now Oklahoma City Thunder)
- 1968: Milwaukee Bucks; Phoenix Suns
- 1970: Cleveland Cavaliers; Buffalo Braves (now Los Angeles Clippers); Portland Trail Blazers
- 1974: New Orleans Jazz (now Utah Jazz)
- 1976: New York Nets (now Brooklyn Nets), Denver Nuggets, Indiana Pacers, and San Antonio Spurs join NBA after merger with American Basketball Association (ABA).
- 1980: Dallas Mavericks
- 1988: Miami Heat; Charlotte Hornets
- 1989: Minnesota Timberwolves; Orlando Magic
- 1995: Vancouver Grizzlies (now Memphis Grizzlies); Toronto Raptors
- 2002: New Orleans Hornets (now New Orleans Pelicans) – The Charlotte Hornets relocated to New Orleans in 2002, and in 2013 renamed themselves the New Orleans Pelicans. Subsequently, the original Charlotte Hornets' history was assumed by the revived Charlotte Hornets (previously Charlotte Bobcats; see below). Hence, the Pelicans are retrospectively considered by the NBA to be an expansion team that began play in the 2002–03 season.
- 2004: Charlotte Bobcats entered the league and held an expansion draft. In 2014 the team was renamed the Charlotte Hornets (see above) and received possession of the history and records of the Charlotte Hornets prior to 2002. Hence, the Bobcats are retrospectively considered by the NBA to be a revival of the previous Charlotte franchise, having suspended operations from 2002 until 2004.

==== American Basketball Association (ABA) ====
There was only one expansion team in the whole history of the ABA.

- 1972: San Diego Conquistadors

=== National Football League (NFL) ===
Only extant teams are listed. Two charter franchises, the Chicago Cardinals (now Arizona Cardinals) and Decatur Staleys (now the Chicago Bears), are still active. Starting in 1960, the NFL held an expansion draft for new franchises.

- 1921: Green Bay Packers, previously an independent, joined the league.
- 1925: New York Giants — replaced another team of the same name that left the league after one season in 1921
- 1930: Portsmouth Spartans (now Detroit Lions), previously of the Ohio League, joined the NFL.
- 1932: Boston Braves (now Washington Commanders) – replaced the 1931 Cleveland Indians, who in turn replaced the Orange/Newark Tornadoes, a 1929 expansion team that left the league in 1931.
- 1933: Philadelphia Eagles — replaced the Frankford Yellow Jackets, a 1924 expansion team that folded in 1931; Pittsburgh Pirates (now Pittsburgh Steelers), previously the Rooneys of the Western Pennsylvania Senior Independent Football Conference, joined the league.
- 1937: Cleveland Rams (now Los Angeles Rams) joined, having previously played in the 1936 American Football League.
- 1950: Three teams joined the NFL after a partial merger with the rival All-America Football Conference (AAFC), of which the Cleveland Browns and San Francisco 49ers still exist.
- 1953: Baltimore Colts (second) (now Indianapolis Colts) — replaced the position held by several franchises, dating back to another charter franchise, the Dayton Triangles. Not to be confused with the AAFC Baltimore Colts, who were the third AAFC team to join the NFL but folded in 1950.
- 1960: Dallas Cowboys
- 1961: Minnesota Vikings
- 1966: Atlanta Falcons
- 1967: New Orleans Saints
- 1970: Boston Patriots (now New England Patriots), Buffalo Bills, Cincinnati Bengals, Denver Broncos, Houston Oilers (now Tennessee Titans), Kansas City Chiefs, Miami Dolphins, New York Jets, Oakland Raiders (now Las Vegas Raiders), and San Diego Chargers (now Los Angeles Chargers) join NFL after merger with the 1960 American Football League (AFL). No expansion draft was necessary as the AFL teams were already well established and of comparable strength.
- 1976: Seattle Seahawks; Tampa Bay Buccaneers
- 1995: Carolina Panthers; Jacksonville Jaguars
- 1996: Baltimore Ravens — The Cleveland Browns effectively relocated to Baltimore and became the Ravens. No expansion draft is needed as the league does not change in size, though the statistical history and branding of the Browns stayed in Cleveland for a future revival of the franchise (see below). The Baltimore Ravens are considered by the NFL to be an expansion team that began play in the 1996 season.
- 1999: The Cleveland Browns are revived, hold an expansion draft, and receive possession of the history and records of the Browns prior to 1996. The Browns are considered by the NFL to be a continuation of the previous Cleveland Browns franchise, rather than a 1999 expansion team.
- 2002: Houston Texans

==== American Football League ====
Two teams from the AFL of the 1960s were expansion teams in that league. Both joined the AFL after the merger with the NFL was agreed to, but before it was finalized.

- 1966: Miami Dolphins
- 1968: Cincinnati Bengals

=== National Hockey League (NHL) ===
- 1924: Boston Bruins; Montreal Maroons (defunct in 1947)
- 1925: New York Americans (defunct in 1946); Pittsburgh Pirates (defunct in 1936)
- 1926: Chicago Black Hawks (now Chicago Blackhawks); Detroit Cougars (now Detroit Red Wings); New York Rangers
- 1967: Los Angeles Kings; Minnesota North Stars (now Dallas Stars); California Seals (defunct; merged with Minnesota North Stars in 1978); Philadelphia Flyers; Pittsburgh Penguins; St. Louis Blues
- 1970: Buffalo Sabres; Vancouver Canucks
- 1972: Atlanta Flames (now Calgary Flames); New York Islanders
- 1974: Kansas City Scouts (later Colorado Rockies, now New Jersey Devils); Washington Capitals
- 1979: Hartford Whalers (now Carolina Hurricanes), Quebec Nordiques (now Colorado Avalanche), Edmonton Oilers, and Winnipeg Jets) — all joined NHL after merger with World Hockey Association (WHA).
- 1991: San Jose Sharks
- 1992: Ottawa Senators; Tampa Bay Lightning
- 1993: Mighty Ducks of Anaheim (now Anaheim Ducks); Florida Panthers
- 1996: Arizona Coyotes – All of the Winnipeg Jets records have been transferred to the current Winnipeg Jets franchise in 2026 treating the Coyotes as an expansion team.
- 1998: Nashville Predators
- 1999: Atlanta Thrashers (now current Winnipeg Jets)
- 2000: Columbus Blue Jackets; Minnesota Wild
- 2017: Vegas Golden Knights
- 2021: Seattle Kraken
- 2024: Utah Mammoth – The Arizona Coyotes roster and personnel (including draft picks) are effectively relocated to Salt Lake City though officially considered by the NHL to be an expansion franchise.

=== Major League Soccer (MLS) ===
- 1998: Chicago Fire FC (originally Chicago Fire SC); Miami Fusion (contracted in 2002)
- 2005: Chivas USA (folded by the league in 2014); Real Salt Lake
- 2006: Houston Dynamo – In 2005, the San Jose Earthquakes relocated to Houston, considered to be a new expansion team, while the Earthquakes were put on hiatus until returning in 2008.
- 2007: Toronto FC; revived San Jose Earthquakes
- 2009: Seattle Sounders FC
- 2010: Philadelphia Union
- 2011: Portland Timbers; Vancouver Whitecaps FC
- 2012: Montreal Impact (now CF Montréal)
- 2015: New York City FC; Orlando City SC
- 2017: Atlanta United FC; Minnesota United FC
- 2018: Los Angeles FC
- 2019: FC Cincinnati
- 2020: Inter Miami CF; Nashville SC
- 2021: Austin FC
- 2022: Charlotte FC
- 2023: St. Louis City SC
- 2025: San Diego FC

=== Canadian Football League (CFL) ===
- 1993: Sacramento Gold Miners (defunct) – The first entry in the league's failed attempt to expand into the U.S. After the 1994 season, the team relocated to San Antonio and played as the San Antonio Texans before folding after the 1995 season.
- 1994:
  - Baltimore Stallions (technically defunct) – The Stallions were the most successful team in the CFL's U.S. experiment, winning the Grey Cup in 1995. However, the impending relocation of the NFL's Cleveland Browns to Baltimore led the team to depart for Montreal, where it became the current version of the Montreal Alouettes. Despite this history, the CFL does not recognize the link between the Stallions and Alouettes, instead treating the Alouettes as a continuation of past CFL teams in Montreal.
  - Las Vegas Posse (defunct) – Also part of the CFL's failed U.S. experiment
  - Shreveport Pirates (defunct) – Also part of the CFL's failed U.S. experiment
- 1995: Birmingham Barracudas (defunct); Memphis Mad Dogs (defunct)
- 2002: Ottawa Renegades (defunct, though now treated by the CFL as the same team as the past Ottawa Rough Riders and current Ottawa Redblacks)
- 2014: Ottawa Redblacks

=== National Lacrosse League (NLL) ===
- 1989: Detroit Turbos (defunct); New England Blazers (later Boston Blazers; defunct)
- 1990: Pittsburgh Bulls (defunct)
- 1992: Buffalo Bandits
- 1995: Rochester Knighthawks
- 1996: Charlotte Cobras (defunct)
- 1998: Ontario Raiders (now Toronto Rock); Syracuse Smash (later Ottawa Rebel; defunct)
- 2000: Albany Attack (later San Jose Stealth, Washington Stealth, and Vancouver Stealth; now Vancouver Warriors)
- 2001: Columbus Landsharks (later Arizona Sting; defunct)
- 2002: Calgary Roughnecks; Montreal Express (defunct); New Jersey Storm (later Anaheim Storm; defunct); Vancouver Ravens (defunct)
- 2005: Minnesota Swarm (now Georgia Swarm)
- 2006: Edmonton Rush (now Saskatchewan Rush); Portland Lumberjax (defunct)
- 2007: Chicago Shamrox (defunct); New York Titans (later Orlando Titans; defunct)
- 2009: Boston Blazers (second iteration; defunct)
- 2019: San Diego Seals, Philadelphia Wings
- 2020: Halifax Thunderbirds, New York Riptide (now Ottawa Black Bears)
- 2021: Panther City Lacrosse Club (defunct)
- 2022: Las Vegas Desert Dogs

=== Major League Lacrosse (MLL) ===
- 2006: Chicago Machine (later the second iteration of the Rochester Rattlers and Dallas Rattlers) (defunct); Denver Outlaws; Los Angeles Riptide (defunct); San Francisco Dragons (defunct)
- 2009: Toronto Nationals (later Hamilton Nationals; though the league considers it an expansion, it was a relocation of the management and player assets from the original Rochester Rattlers, though the name, colors and team history remained in Rochester) (defunct)
- 2012: Ohio Machine (defunct); Charlotte Hounds (hiatus then defunct with the PLL merger)
- 2014: Florida Launch (Though the league considers it an expansion, it was a relocation of the management and player assets from the Hamilton Nationals, though the name, colors, and team history remained in Hamilton.) (defunct)
- 2016: Atlanta Blaze (defunct)
- 2020: Connecticut Hammerheads (defunct with the PLL merger)

=== Major League Rugby (MLR) ===
Six of the seven charter franchises from 2018 remain active.

- 2019: Rugby United New York; Toronto Arrows
- 2020: New England Free Jacks; Old Glory DC; Rugby ATL
- 2021: LA Giltinis (defunct)
- 2022: Dallas Jackals
- 2023: Chicago Hounds
- 2024: Anthem RC, Miami Sharks (defunct)
- 2026: California Legion

=== Women's National Basketball Association (WNBA) ===
The WNBA began in 1997 with eight charter franchises, four of which are still active: the Los Angeles Sparks, New York Liberty, Phoenix Mercury, and Utah Starzz (now Las Vegas Aces).

- 1998: Detroit Shock (now Dallas Wings); Washington Mystics
- 1999: Orlando Miracle (now Connecticut Sun); Minnesota Lynx
- 2000: Indiana Fever; Seattle Storm; Miami Sol (defunct); Portland Fire (defunct)
- 2006: Chicago Sky
- 2008: Atlanta Dream
- 2025: Golden State Valkyries
- 2026: Portland Fire; Toronto Tempo
- 2028: Cleveland Sirens
- 2029: Detroit
- 2030: Philadelphia

=== National Women's Soccer League (NWSL) ===
- 2014: Houston Dash
- 2016: Orlando Pride
- 2017: North Carolina Courage (roster relocated from folded Western New York Flash)
- 2018: Utah Royals FC (roster relocated from folded FC Kansas City)
- 2021: Racing Louisville; Kansas City Current (roster relocated from folded Utah Royals FC)
- 2022: Angel City; San Diego Wave
- 2024: Bay FC; revival of Utah Royals (without "FC")
- 2026: Boston Legacy; Denver Summit
- 2028: Atlanta City; Columbus

=== Canadian Premier League (CPL) ===
- 2020: Atlético Ottawa
- 2023: Vancouver FC
- 2026: FC Supra du Québec

=== Canadian Elite Basketball League (CEBL) ===
- 2020: Ottawa BlackJacks
- 2022: Montreal Alliance; Scarborough Shooting Stars; Newfoundland Growlers
- 2023: Winnipeg Sea Bears

== Expansion teams in Australia and New Zealand ==
=== A-League Men ===
- 2007–08: Wellington Phoenix
- 2009–10: Gold Coast United and Northern Fury FC (defunct)
- 2010–11: Melbourne Heart (now Melbourne City since 2014–15 A-League season)
- 2012–13: Western Sydney Wanderers
- 2019–20: Western United (pause)
- 2020–21: Macarthur FC
- 2024–25: Auckland FC
- 2026–27: Canberra

=== Australian Baseball League ===
- 2018: Auckland Tuatara; Geelong-Korea (both folded after 2023 season)

=== Australian Football League ===
- 1908: Richmond Tigers (relocated from the VFA), University (dropped out of competition and folded at the end of 1914)
- 1925: Hawthorn Hawks, North Melbourne Kangaroos and Footscray Bulldogs (became Western Bulldogs in 1996). All three teams relocated from the VFA.
- 1987: Brisbane Bears (now Brisbane Lions); West Coast Eagles
- 1991: Adelaide Crows
- 1995: Fremantle Dockers
- 1997: Port Adelaide Power (had history/links from the successful Port Adelaide Magpies in the SANFL)
- 2011: Gold Coast Suns
- 2012: Greater Western Sydney Giants
- 2028: Tasmania FC

=== AFL Women's ===
AFL Women's, launched in 2017 with 8 teams, is operated by the Australian Football League, with all teams fielded by AFL clubs. The league expanded to 10 teams prior to the 2019 season and 14 prior to the 2020 season. In 2023, the remaining four AFL clubs launched women's sides.

- 2019: Geelong; North Melbourne
- 2020: Gold Coast Suns; Richmond; St Kilda; West Coast Eagles
- 2023: Essendon, Hawthorn, Port Adelaide, Sydney Swans

=== National Basketball League ===
- 1980: Coburg Giants (later became North Melbourne Giants in 1987–1998); Launceston Casino City (defunct)
- 1981: Forestville Eagles (now currently playing NBL1 Central)
- 1982: Adelaide City Eagles (now Adelaide 36ers); Geelong Cats (now Geelong Supercats until 1996 but now currently playing NBL1 South); Westate Wildcats (now Perth Wildcats)
- 1983: Devonport Warriors (defunct); Hobart Devils (defunct)
- 1984: Melbourne Tigers (now Melbourne United)
- 1988: Sydney Kings (merger of Sydney Supersonics and West Sydney Westars)
- 1990: Gold Coast Cougars (defunct, later known as Gold Coast Rollers)
- 1992: South East Melbourne Magic (defunct)
- 1993: Townsville Suns (now Townsville Crocodiles since 1998)
- 1998: Victoria Titans (later became Victoria Giants in 2002–2004 and then defunct); West Sydney Razorbacks (in its last season, Sydney Spirit; defunct)
- 1999: Cairns Taipans
- 2004: Hunter Pirates (defunct); New Zealand Breakers
- 2006: Singapore Slingers (defunct); South Dragons (defunct)
- 2007: Gold Coast Blaze (defunct)
- 2019: South East Melbourne Phoenix
- 2021: Tasmania JackJumpers

=== National Rugby League ===
- 1910: Annandale
- 1920: University
- 1921: St. George Dragons
- 1935: Canterbury-Bankstown Bulldogs
- 1947: Manly-Warringah Sea Eagles; Parramatta Eels
- 1967: Cronulla-Sutherland Sharks; Penrith Panthers
- 1982: Canberra Raiders; Illawarra Steelers (now part of joint venture with St. George Dragons)
- 1988: Brisbane Broncos; Gold Coast-Tweed Giants (later Chargers, now defunct); Newcastle Knights
- 1995: Auckland Warriors (now New Zealand Warriors); North Queensland Cowboys; South Queensland Crushers (now defunct); Western Reds (now defunct)
- 1998: Melbourne Storm; Adelaide Rams (now defunct)
- 1999: St George Illawarra Dragons (Joint venture between St. George Dragons and Illawarra Steelers)
- 2000: Wests Tigers (joint venture between Western Suburbs Magpies and Balmain Tigers)
- 2000: Northern Eagles (joint venture between North Sydney Bears and Manly-Warringah Sea Eagles) (now defunct; reverted to Manly-Warringah Sea Eagles)
- 2007: Gold Coast Titans
- 2023: The Dolphins
- 2027: Perth Bears
- 2028: Papua New Guinea Chiefs

=== Super Rugby ===
- 2006: Cheetahs and Western Force
  - The Cheetahs and Force were both dropped from Super Rugby after the 2017 season. The Cheetahs immediately became an expansion team in Pro14 (now the United Rugby Championship), but ceased Super Rugby operations when the country's four principal Super Rugby sides joined the URC in 2021. The Force later moved to Australia's National Rugby Championship, but after that league folded, it would return to Super Rugby, first in the COVID-era Super Rugby AU before joining the retooled Super Rugby Pacific in 2022.
- 2011: Melbourne Rebels (now defunct)
- 2013: Southern Kings
  - The Kings were dropped from Super Rugby at the same time as the Cheetahs and Force, and joined Pro14 alongside the Cheetahs. The team folded in 2020 when a planned takeover bid collapsed in fraud.
- 2016: Jaguares and Sunwolves (both now defunct)
- 2022: Moana Pasifika and Fijian Drua

=== Women's National Basketball League ===
- 1983: AIS (defunct)
- 1984: Bulleen Boomers (now Melbourne Boomers)
- 1986: Canberra Capitals
- 1989: Sydney Flames (now Sydney Uni Flames)
- 1990: Perth Lynx
- 1992: Adelaide Lightning; Dandenong Rangers
- 2001: Townsville Fire
- 2007: Bendigo Spirit
- 2008: Logan Thunder (defunct)
- 2015: South East Queensland Stars

== Expansion teams in Asia ==
=== Asia League Ice Hockey ===
- 2004: Harbin; Qiqihar; Golden Amur (all defunct)
- 2005: High1; Nordic Vikings (both defunct)
- 2006: Seibu Prince Rabbits; Changchun Fuao; China Hosa (all defunct)
- 2007: China Dragon (as China Sharks) (defunct)
- 2009: Tohoku Free Blades
- 2012: Daemyung Sangmu (defunct)
- 2013: PSK Sakhalin (expelled in 2022)
- 2016: Daemyung Killer Whales (defunct)
- 2019: East Hokkaido Cranes (folded in 2023)
- 2022: Yokohama Grits
- 2025: Stars Kobe

=== Indian Premier League ===
- 2011: Kochi Tuskers Kerala; Pune Warriors India
- 2016: Gujarat Lions; Rising Pune Supergiants
- 2022: Gujarat Titans; Lucknow Super Giants

=== Indian Super League ===
- 2017–2018: Bengaluru FC; Jamshedpur FC
- 2019–2020: Hyderabad FC
- 2020–2021: SC East Bengal

=== Maharlika Pilipinas Basketball League ===
- 2018–19: Bacoor City Strikers (inactive); Basilan Steel; Cebu City Sharks (now Cebu Greats); Davao Occidental Tigers (inactive); GenSan Warriors; Laguna Heroes (now Biñan Tatak Gel); Makati Skyscrapers (defunct, last played as Makati OKBet Kings); Mandaluyong El Tigre (defunct); Manila Stars (now Manila Batang Quiapo); Marikina Shoemasters; Pampanga Lanterns (now Pampanga Giant Lanterns, inactive); Pasig Pirates (now Pasig City); Pasay Voyagers; Rizal Crusaders (now Rizal Golden Coolers); San Juan Knights; Zamboanga Valientes (split and became Zamboanga Family's Brand Sardines; now Zamboanga Sikat)
- 2019–20: Bacolod Master Sardines (suspended, lasted played as Bacolod Masskara); Bicol Volcanoes (defunct, last played as Bicolandia Oragons); Iloilo United Royals (defunct); Mindoro Tamaraws; Nueva Ecija MiGuard (now Nueva Ecija Rice Vanguards, inactive); Soccsksargen Marlins (now Sarangani Marlins)
- 2023: Negros Muscovados (now Negros Hacienderos); Quezon Huskers
- 2024: Abra Weavers; Pangasinan Heatwaves (inactive); Tarlac United Force (withdrew)
- 2025: Ilagan Isabela Cowboys

=== Philippine Basketball Association ===
- 1978: Filmanbank Bankers (defunct)
- 1979: Gilbey's Gin (now Barangay Ginebra San Miguel)
- 1980: CDCP/Galleon Shippers (defunct)
- 1983: Manhattan Shirtmakers/Country Fair Hotdogs (defunct)
- 1984: Manila Beer Brewmasters (folded after the 1986 season)
- 1985: Shell Azodrin Bugbusters (folded in 2005)
- 1986: Alaska Aces (folded in 2022)
- 1988: Purefoods Hotdogs
- 1990: Pop Cola Sizzlers (folded after the 2001 season); Pepsi Hotshots (now TNT Tropang 5G)
- 1993: Sta. Lucia Realtors (folded in 2010)
- 1999: Tanduay Rhum Masters (folded after the 2001 season)
- 2000: Batang Red Bull Energy Kings (from the PBL, note that the promotion and relegation system was not used.) (folded in 2011)
- 2002: FedEx Express (folded in 2016); Coca-Cola Tigers (folded in 2012)
- 2006: Welcoat Dragons (from the PBL, note that the promotion and relegation system was not used.) (now Rain or Shine Elasto Painters)
- 2010: Meralco Bolts
- 2011: Shopinas.com Clickers (folded in 2014)
- 2012: GlobalPort Batang Pier (folded in 2025)
- 2014: Blackwater Elite; Kia Sorento (now Terrafirma Dyip); NLEX Road Warriors
- 2016: Phoenix Fuel Masters
- 2022: Converge FiberXers
- 2025: Titan Ultra Giant Risers

=== Philippines Football League ===
- 2017 (debut season): Ceres-Negros F.C. (now United City F.C., inactive); Davao Aguilas F.C. (now Aguilas-UMak F.C.); Global F.C. (club license suspended); Ilocos United F.C. (inactive); Kaya F.C. (now Kaya F.C.-Iloilo); Loyola F.C. (formerly F.C. Meralco Manila, inactive); JPV Marikina F.C. (inactive, reverted to Manila All-Japan F.C. name); Stallion Laguna F.C.
- 2019: Green Archers United F.C. (defunct); Mendiola F.C. 1991; Philippine Air Force F.C. (inactive)
- 2020: Azkals Development Team (defunct); Maharlika Manila (now Maharlika F.C.)
- 2022-2023: Dynamic Herb Cebu F.C.
- 2024: Don Bosco Garelli; Manila Digger; Manila Montet (inactive); One Taguig; Philippine Army; Tuloy F.C.
- 2024-2025: Philippine Youth National Team (inactive)

=== Pakistan Super League ===
- 2018: Multan Sultans

=== P. LEAGUE+ ===
- 2021: New Taipei Kings (now with TPBL); Kaohsiung Steelers (folded)
- 2024: Tainan TSG GhostHawks
- 2025: Yankey Ark

=== Premier Volleyball League ===
- 2021 (pro debut): Cignal HD Spikers (inactive); Chery Tiggo Crossovers (defunct); PLDT Home Fibr Power Hitters (now PLDT High Speed Hitters); Sta. Lucia Lady Realtors (inactive)
- 2022: F2 Logistics Cargo Movers (defunct); Akari Chargers
- 2023: Quezon City Gerflor Defenders (defunct); Foton Tornadoes (defunct); Nxled Chameleons; Galeries Highrisers; Farm Fresh Foxies
- 2024: Strong Group Athletics (now Zus Coffee Thunderbelles); Capital1 Solar Spikers

== Expansion teams in Europe ==
=== European League of Football ===
- 2022: Raiders Tirol; Rhein Fire; Vienna Vikings; Istanbul Rams (withdrew after one season)
- 2023: Fehérvár Enthroners; Milano Seamen; Munich Ravens; Paris Musketeers; Prague Lions; Helvetic Guards (replaced by Helvetic Mercenaries in 2024)
- 2024: Madrid Bravos
- 2025: Nordic Storm

=== Kontinental Hockey League ===
- 2009: Avtomobilist Yekaterinburg
- 2010: HC Yugra
- 2011: Lev Poprad – This team, based in Slovakia, was purchased after its first KHL season (2011–12) by Czech interests. It was disbanded and replaced by the similarly named Lev Praha. The latter team folded at the end of the 2013–14 season.
- 2012: HC Donbass; Slovan Bratislava
  - Donbass left the KHL after the 2013–14 season. The team joined what is now known as the Ukrainian Hockey League in 2015–16.
- 2013: Admiral Vladivostok; KHL Medveščak (from Zagreb, Croatia)
  - Medveščak, which had joined from the Austrian Hockey League, withdrew from the KHL after the 2016–17 season to rejoin the Austrian league.
- 2014: Sochi; Jokerit (from Helsinki, Finland)
- 2016: Kunlun Red Star (from Beijing, China)
- 2023: Lada Togliatti

=== United Rugby Championship ===
Originally known as the Celtic League, and later as Pro12 and Pro14.

- 2010:
  - Aironi – A team formed specifically for the competition by several existing clubs in Northern Italy, with Viadana the lead side. The team folded when the Italian Rugby Federation (FIR) revoked its professional license effective with the end of the 2011–12 Pro12 season; it was replaced by the FIR-operated Zebre.
  - Benetton Treviso – Founded in 1932, it competed in Italian domestic leagues before joining the competition originally known as the Celtic League, later known as Pro12 and now as Pro14.
- 2017:
  - Cheetahs
  - Southern Kings
    - These teams had played in Super Rugby before that competition's governing body, SANZAAR, axed three teams at the end of the 2017 season. Both had themselves been Super Rugby expansion teams; the Cheetahs entered in 2006 and the Kings in 2013. The Kings were liquidated prior to the 2020–21 season when a planned takeover bid collapsed in fraud; the Cheetahs left after that season.
- 2021:
  - Bulls
  - Lions
  - Sharks
  - Stormers
    - South Africa's so-called "Big Four" Super Rugby sides left that competition after its reorganisation amid the COVID-19 pandemic. They joined the former Pro14, which changed its name to the United Rugby Championship.

=== Super League ===
- 1995: Paris Saint-Germain RL (now defunct)
- 2006: Catalans Dragons — Although Super League used a promotion and relegation system at that time, Les Catalans, as the only French team in the otherwise all-English competition, were assured of a place in the league through 2008. Super League instituted a franchise system effective with the 2009 season, and Les Catalans retained their place in the league.
- 2009:
  - Celtic Crusaders (later Crusaders Rugby League) – An expansion team only in the sense that they were invited into Super League. The club were established in 2005. After the 2011 season, the club folded due to financial problems; their effective successor club, the North Wales Crusaders, currently compete in League 1, two levels below Super League.
  - Salford City Reds – Also technically not an expansion team; they have existed since 1873 and played in Super League as recently as the 2007 season.
- 2012: Widnes Vikings – An expansion team only in the sense that they have been invited into the now-franchised Super League. The club have existed since 1875, were founding members of what is now the Rugby Football League in 1895, and participated in Super League as recently as 2005.

=== VTB United League ===
- 2010: Espoon Honka; Tsmoki-Minsk (formerly Minsk-2006)
- 2022: Samara; MBA Moscow
- 2023: Uralmash Ekaterinburg; Runa Basket Moscow

== Expansion teams in Africa ==
=== Vodacom Cup ===
- 2010:
  - Welwitschias (a developmental side for the Namibia national rugby union team) – This was the second time Namibia participated in the competition; it entered a team from 1999 to 2001. The team withdrew from the competition after the 2011 season due to financial constraints. They remained in the Vodacom Cup until the competition was scrapped after its 2015 season. The team now features in the Vodacom Cup's successor competition, the Rugby Challenge.
  - Pampas XV (a developmental side for the Argentina national rugby union team) – Argentina left the Vodacom Cup after the 2013 season, choosing instead to enter the IRB Pacific Cup from 2014. At that time, it was also expected that Argentina would be added to Super Rugby in the near future, and the country would eventually receive a Super Rugby team beginning in 2016.

== eSports ==
=== League of Legends ===
The League of Legends Championship Series (LCS) and the League of Legends European Championship (LEC) initially fielded teams from eight organizations when they began operations in 2013; both leagues expanded to a total of ten teams in 2015.

LCS expansion teams

- Team Liquid (2015)
- Winterfox (2015; folded 2016)
- Gravity Gaming → Echo Fox (2015; folded 2019)
- Immortals (2016)
- Phoenix1 (2016; folded 2018)
- Flyquest (2017)
- 100 Thieves (2018)
- Golden Guardians (2018)
- Evil Geniuses (2020)

LEC expansion teams

- Elements (2015; folded 2016)
- SK Gaming (2015)
- Schalke 04 (2016)
- Splyce → MAD Lions (2016)
- G2 Esports (2016)
- Team Vitality (2016)
- Excel Esports (2019)
- Rogue (2019)
