= 1961 Major League Baseball expansion =

Expansion of the major baseball leagues

The 1961 Major League Baseball expansion resulted in the formation of two new Major League Baseball (MLB) franchises in the American League (AL). A new club was started in Washington, D.C., and took the existing name of the Senators, as the previous team of the same name moved to Minneapolis–Saint Paul for the start of the 1961 season and became the Minnesota Twins. The second new franchise was granted to an ownership group led by Gene Autry for a team in Los Angeles who named themselves the Angels. The two new teams each paid a fee of $2.1 million and became the 17th and 18th franchises in MLB.

The expansion was part of an initiative in response to the perceived threat of a proposed third major league, the Continental League. In 1962, the National League (NL) also added two new teams, the Houston Colt .45s (later renamed the Astros) and the New York Mets.

Locations of teams for the 1955–1960 American League seasons
American League
Locations of teams for the 1961 American League season
American League

== Background ==
For a 50-year period from 1903 to 1952, MLB's 16-team structure remained intact. No franchises were relocated during this period, although five markets, Boston, Chicago, New York City, Philadelphia, and St. Louis, had two or more teams. According to authors Andy McCue and Eric Thompson, "By 1953, ... Population had moved from the northeast quadrant to the vibrant cities of the West and South. The less financially successful clubs in two-team cities were finding it increasingly difficult to compete."

The situation changed as the Boston Braves moved to Milwaukee in 1953, the St. Louis Browns relocated to Baltimore a year later, and the Philadelphia Athletics moved to Kansas City in 1955. Then, before the 1958 season, the two New York City teams in the NL moved to the West Coast with the Dodgers moving to Los Angeles and the Giants moving to San Francisco. New York City sought a replacement NL franchise, and by December 1958 MLB had created an Expansion Committee. Despite the formation of the group, MLB displayed little intention of adding a New York team.

The relocation of the Dodgers and Giants led to a proposal for a third major league: the Continental League, which would have started by 1961 with franchises in markets MLB had previously ignored. In addition, MLB faced pressure from the U.S. Congress, which indicated that efforts to prevent future expansion would potentially endanger the sport's exemption from antitrust laws. Congress voted on a bill aimed at repealing the exemption, but it failed to pass. However, MLB moved to expand after a rival league became a possibility. The potential threat posed by the Continental League ended in August 1960, when the NL proposed expanding to include four of the new organization's clubs. The AL then became interested in the idea of expansion. Expansion Committee chairman Del Webb initially backed the addition of a Houston-based franchise, but the NL spoiled the idea when it announced the addition of teams in that city and New York for 1962.

== Markets ==
For many years, Los Angeles had been rumored to be a potential site for an AL franchise. At the time of the expansion, the Los Angeles area was the second-most populated in the U.S., and several sports teams had already moved into the city, including the NL's Dodgers. Actor Gene Autry led a group that paid $2.1 million for the right to place an MLB team in Los Angeles. Autry, who owned radio stations, had been seeking to acquire a contract to broadcast baseball games when he traveled to MLB's Winter Meetings. After the Meetings, on December 6, 1960, his group received franchise rights. The Los Angeles team was initially scheduled to begin play in 1962, but a relocation plan elsewhere in the AL resulted in the start date being moved up to 1961. The club was nicknamed the Angels, after a Pacific Coast League team that had previously played in the city. To secure the name rights, Autry paid a $350,000 fee to Dodgers owner Walter O'Malley, who had purchased the minor league Angels before relocating the Dodgers to Los Angeles.

Initially, leading figures in Minneapolis–St. Paul, Minnesota, had sought an expansion franchise. However, Senators owner Calvin Griffith believed his team could not prosper in the capital city of Washington, D.C., and sought to relocate to Minnesota. The Senators had played in Washington, D.C., starting in 1901, and had won the 1924 World Series. Starting in the 1940s, however, the club had slipped towards the bottom of the AL standings for most seasons. In October 1960, the AL permitted the Senators to move in time for next year's season, and gave Washington, D.C., an expansion team. The former Senators changed their name to the Minnesota Twins, and the new expansion team took the Senators name. The decision was partially in response to pressure from Congress, which had wanted a replacement for the former Senators. As with the Angels' ownership group, the new Senators' owners paid a $2.1 million fee for the right to an MLB franchise. The two new teams became the 17th and 18th clubs in MLB. Furthermore, the American League season itself was expanded from 154 games per team to 162.

== Expansion draft ==
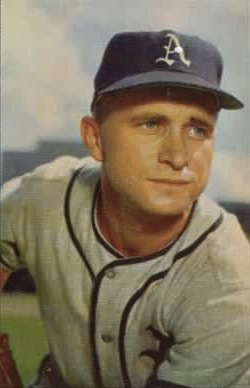
Bobby Shantz (pictured in 1953) was the Senators' first pick in the expansion draft

A draft was held on December 14, 1960, to stock the new teams with players from the existing AL clubs. All teams were required to make seven players draftable from their regular rosters, along with eight more from their expanded rosters of 40 players, with the number of players that could be selected from one franchise capped at seven. The Angels and Senators were limited to 28 picks each, and were forced to pay $75,000 per pick. There were also requirements to choose certain numbers of players for each position.

The Angels won the first overall pick in the expansion draft via coin toss and used it to select New York Yankees pitcher Eli Grba. The Senators followed by taking another Yankees pitcher, Bobby Shantz, with their first choice. Later in the draft, both teams violated the rules prohibiting existing clubs from losing more than seven players from their normal rosters; by the 43rd pick, the Cleveland Indians and Detroit Tigers had each seen eight of their players chosen, and another rule mandating that the Angels and Senators not take more than four players from any one team was also ignored. Angels manager Bill Rigney later said that the teams had not been notified about the rules by the AL.

Despite an effort by AL president Joe Cronin that required both teams to relinquish earlier selections and choose different players, imbalances still existed in player selections; seven of the eight AL teams had had five or more players drafted by the Angels or Senators. In response, player trades between the expansion teams were mandated by Cronin. In the last of these trades, future Cy Young Award-winning pitcher Dean Chance was sent to the Angels by Washington.

== Performance of expansion teams ==
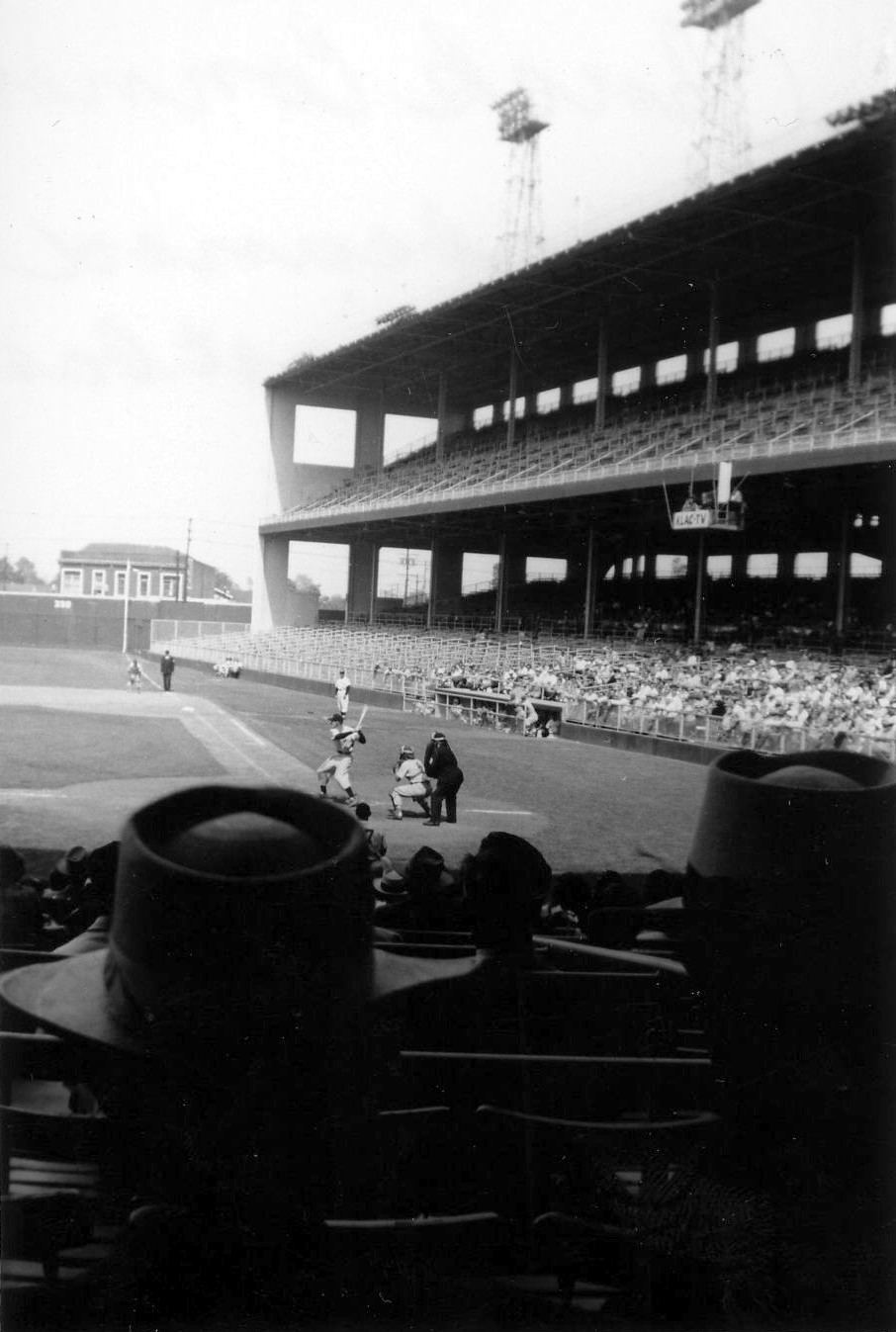
Wrigley Field in Los Angeles, the first home stadium for the expansion Angels franchise

In 1961, Wrigley Field (unaffiliated with the stadium of the same name in Chicago), a former minor league stadium, served as the home of the Angels; for the next four seasons, they shared Dodger Stadium with the Dodgers. Los Angeles won 70 games in its first season, exceeding expectations. The following season, they held first place in the AL as late as July 4, ending the year with 86 victories. However, the team's performance declined in future years, as its strategy of acquiring "recognizable names" led to aging talent whose output fell before the Angels' minor league system could replace them. The Angels moved into Anaheim Stadium in 1966, and won their first World Series in 2002, while known as the Anaheim Angels.

The Senators experienced a lack of strong fan interest in their inaugural season, drawing under 600,000 fans for the year. The team annually posted about 90 defeats in most future years, and did not win more games than it lost until 1969, when Washington ended the season with an 86–76 win–loss record. The original owner of the club left early in the Senators' existence, and a second shift occurred shortly after stockbrokers James Johnson and James Lemon purchased the team from Elwood Quesada. In September 1971, then-owner Bob Short announced that the Senators would move to the Dallas area after the season; the team's last game in Washington was forfeited due to "unruly behavior" by Senators fans. It would not be until 2005 when MLB returned to Washington by relocating the NL's Montreal Expos, established in 1969, and renaming them the Washington Nationals. The Nationals would win their first World Series in 2019, while the Texas Rangers would claim their first Series win in 2023.

== Aftermath ==
The 1961 expansion was the first in a series of moves that resulted in MLB nearly doubling in size to 30 franchises. As part of MLB's effort to prevent the formation of the Continental League, the NL added the New York Mets and Houston Colt .45s (who later changed their nickname to the Astros) for the 1962 season. Another expansion draft was made to stock the new teams for the 1962 season. Four new clubs joined the AL and NL in 1969, in San Diego, Kansas City, Montreal, and Seattle (although the team moved to Milwaukee the following year). Further two-team expansions took place in 1977, 1993, and 1998. The expansions had the effect of placing MLB teams across the continent; before 1961, only four teams (the Dodgers, Giants, Kansas City Athletics, and St. Louis Cardinals) were based west of the Mississippi.

== See also ==
- 1962 Major League Baseball expansion
- 1969 Major League Baseball expansion
- 1977 Major League Baseball expansion
- 1993 Major League Baseball expansion
- 1998 Major League Baseball expansion

== Bibliography ==
- Dickson, Paul (2009). The Dickson Baseball Dictionary (3 ed.). W. W. Norton & Company. ISBN 9780393066814.
- Fetter, Henry D. (2005). Taking on the Yankees: Winning and Losing in the Business of Baseball. W. W. Norton & Company. ISBN 0-393-32674-8.
- Jozsa, Frank P. (2006). Big Sports, Big Business: A Century of League Expansions, Mergers, and Reorganizations. Greenwood Publishing Group. ISBN 9780275991340.
- Jozsa, Jr., Frank (2010). Major League Baseball Expansions and Relocations: A History, 1876–2008. McFarland & Company. ISBN 9780786457236.
- Longley, Neil (2013). An Absence of Competition: The Sustained Competitive Advantage of the Monopoly Sports Leagues. Springer Science+Business Media. ISBN 9781461494850.
- Morales, Bill (2011). Farewell to the Last Golden Era: The Yankees, the Pirates and the 1960 Baseball Season. McFarland & Company. ISBN 978-0-7864-6327-5.
- Zimniuch, Fran (2013). Baseball's New Frontier: A History of Expansion, 1961–1998. University of Nebraska Press. ISBN 9780803246829.
