= Agreement in principle =

In law, term used in a negotiation

In law, an agreement in principle is a stepping stone to a contract. Such agreements with regard to the principle are usually considered fair and equitable. Even if not all details are known, an agreement in principle may, for example, outline a schedule of royalties.

In real property transactions, a binder is a document that sets the sales price for the property.
