= 1962 Major League Baseball expansion =

Formation of baseball teams

The 1962 Major League Baseball expansion was the formation of two new Major League Baseball (MLB) teams for the 1962 season. The Houston Colt .45s (later renamed the Astros) and the New York Mets were added to the National League (NL), becoming the 19th and 20th teams in MLB's two leagues. The Colt .45s were the first major league team in Houston while the Mets filled the void left when the New York Giants and Brooklyn Dodgers of the NL moved to California after the 1957 season.

The expansion was the second part of an initiative that resulted in the addition of four clubs to MLB. The previous year the American League had added the Los Angeles Angels and second incarnation of the Washington Senators.

Locations of teams for the 1960–1961 National League seasons
National League
Locations of teams for the 1962–1963 National League seasons
National League

== Background ==
For a 50-year period from 1903 to 1952, MLB's 16-team structure (split into the American and National Leagues) remained intact. No franchises were relocated during this period, and five markets—Boston, Chicago, New York City, Philadelphia, and St. Louis—had two or more teams. According to authors Andy McCue and Eric Thompson, "The less financially successful clubs in two-team cities were finding it increasingly difficult to compete" by the early 1950s. In addition, population changes in the United States were leading to many citizens moving away from the Northeast, where many MLB teams were based, to southern and western locations.

From 1953 to 1955, three franchises were relocated, all of which had been in markets with two or more teams. Prior to the 1958 season, the two New York City teams in the NL, the Brooklyn Dodgers and New York Giants, moved westward; the Dodgers relocated to Los Angeles, while San Francisco became the new home of the Giants. New York City sought a replacement NL franchise, and by December 1958 MLB had created an Expansion Committee. Despite the formation of the group, MLB displayed little intention of adding a New York team. The city had beaten MLB to planning for future expansion, with the formation of the Mayor's Committee shortly after the Dodgers and Giants announced their moves; the committee was headed by lawyer William Shea.

The relocation of the Dodgers and Giants led to a proposal for a third major league: the Continental League, which would have started by 1961 with franchises in markets MLB had previously ignored. In addition, MLB was facing pressure from the U.S. Congress, which indicated that efforts to prevent future expansion would arouse interest in weakening the sport's exemption from antitrust laws. Congress voted on a bill aimed at repealing the exemption, but it failed. However, MLB moved to expand after a rival league became a possibility. MLB formed an expansion committee, which voted in favor of adding four new teams, two in each league, by 1961–62.

MLB sought cities that had received interest from the Continental League. Among them were Houston, Los Angeles, New York City, and Washington, D.C. The NL announced an expansion as the 1960 World Series was in progress, with new teams in Houston and New York City. Shea had been a supporter of the Continental League concept, and had attracted several investors. A potential Houston team also had numerous partners, many of whom had oil interests. The AL initially showed interest in adding a Houston team, but the investors wanted an NL franchise. MLB granted the two cities franchises on October 17, 1960. Furthermore, the National League season itself was expanded from 154 games (per team) to 162.

== Markets ==
The idea of a replacement NL club in New York City was strongly supported by city Mayor Robert Wagner. The city was unable to secure funding for a proposed Flushing Meadows stadium in time for play in 1962, so the Mets played at the Polo Grounds, the previous home of the New York Giants. George Weiss was the president of the team, and seven-time World Series championship-winning manager Casey Stengel was hired to lead the Mets on the field.

The Houston Sports Association was formed in 1957 and bought a minor league baseball team four years later. The group was given a controlling interest in Houston's expansion team, which was nicknamed the Colt .45s. It played at Colt Stadium.

== Expansion draft ==
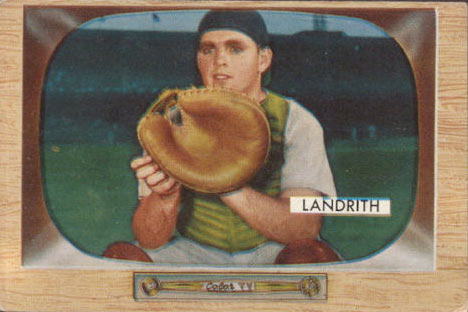
Hobie Landrith (pictured in 1955) was the Mets' first pick in the expansion draft

A draft was held on October 10, 1961, to stock the new teams with players from the existing NL clubs. All eight original NL teams were required to make 15 players available to be drafted by the Colt .45s and Mets from their regular rosters. A maximum number of possible selections in the draft was set at 45. The players were divided into three price classes, based on what would be charged to the expansion teams. They could each take 4 "premium" players, who cost $125,000 per player, 16 $75,000 players, and 3 $50,000 players; the Mets chose only 2 $50,000 players. A coin toss was held to determine who would receive the first overall pick in the expansion draft; it was won by Houston.

The Colt .45s had the first overall pick in the expansion draft and selected San Francisco Giants infielder Eddie Bressoud. The Mets' first selection was another player from the Giants, catcher Hobie Landrith. The Mets' later selections in the draft included Gil Hodges of the Los Angeles Dodgers and Don Zimmer of the Chicago Cubs. The teams alternated choices through the first 36 picks, before the Colt .45s selected Jim Golden and Joey Amalfitano consecutively. Each team then had every other selection until the end of the draft, which came after the Mets picked Lee Walls of the Philadelphia Phillies with the 45th overall choice.

Both teams selected five outfielders in the expansion draft. The Colt .45s picked seven infielders, one more than the Mets; New York's three catchers chosen was one more than the two taken by Houston. Seven pitchers were taken by the Mets; the Colt .45s took four.

== Performance of expansion teams ==
After losses in nine straight games to start the 1962 season, the Mets set a then-MLB record with 120 losses in their 160 games played. The team featured two pitchers who lost at least 20 games and had the lowest batting average in the NL. Despite the repeated setbacks on the field, the Mets proved popular with fans of the previous NL franchises in New York, drawing more than 900,000 fans to the Polo Grounds in 1962. The Mets played one more season at the stadium, before Shea Stadium was built in time for the 1964 season, in which New York drew 1.8 million spectators. By 1969, the Mets had won their first World Series, one of two earned by the franchise. In addition, New York has won five NL pennants and six division titles.

The Colt .45s played their first three seasons at Colt Stadium before beginning play at the Astrodome in 1965. The team won its first game, defeating the Chicago Cubs by a score of 11–2. At the end of their first season, the Colt .45s were in eighth place in the NL; the Cubs and Mets were behind them. The franchise did not finish higher than eighth over the next six years, before improving in the following decade. Houston eventually changed its team nickname to the Astros, and won the 2005 NL pennant; in addition, it played in the National League Championship Series three other times. The Astros moved to the American League in the 2013 season. They made their second World Series appearance four years later, winning for the first time. The Astros would win two more AL pennants, in 2019 and 2021, before winning a second World Series title in 2022.

== Aftermath ==
Following the 1961 expansion that resulted in the addition of the Los Angeles Angels and the second incarnation of the Washington Senators to the AL, the 1962 expansion was part of a series of moves that led to MLB nearly doubling in size to 30 franchises. Four new clubs joined the AL and NL in 1969, in San Diego, Kansas City, Montreal, and Seattle (although the team moved to Milwaukee the following year). Further two-team expansions took place in 1977, 1993, and 1998.

== See also ==
- 1961 Major League Baseball expansion
- 1969 Major League Baseball expansion
- 1977 Major League Baseball expansion
- 1993 Major League Baseball expansion
- 1998 Major League Baseball expansion

== Bibliography ==
- Jozsa, Jr., Frank (2010). Major League Baseball Expansions and Relocations: A History, 1876–2008. McFarland & Company. ISBN 9780786457236.
- Longley, Neil (2013). An Absence of Competition: The Sustained Competitive Advantage of the Monopoly Sports Leagues. Springer Science+Business Media. ISBN 9781461494850.
