= 1993 Major League Baseball expansion =

Establishment of the 27th and 28th teams in MLB

The 1993 Major League Baseball expansion resulted in Major League Baseball (MLB) adding two expansion teams to the National League (NL) for the 1993 season: the Colorado Rockies and the Florida Marlins (now known as the Miami Marlins).

Locations of teams for the 1977–1992 National League seasons
West East
Locations of teams for the 1993 National League season
West East

== Background ==
Talks of expansion began on August 8, 1985, when the players and the owners agreed to a new collective bargaining agreement (CBA). The basic agreement allowed the National League to expand by two members to match the American League, which had done so in 1977. Details of expansion were finalized in the 1990 CBA.

Ten cities were considered serious candidates for the two spots: Buffalo, Charlotte, Denver, Miami, Nashville, Orlando, Phoenix, Sacramento, Tampa Bay, and Washington. The Florida Suncoast Dome in St. Petersburg and Pilot Field in Buffalo were built specifically to lure an existing or expansion MLB franchise.

The National League expansion committee consisted of Pittsburgh Pirates Chairman Doug Danfort, New York Mets president Fred Wilpon and Houston Astros owner John McMullen. On December 18, 1990, the committee eliminated Charlotte, Nashville, Phoenix and Sacramento from consideration to cut the list down to six finalists. With three sites from Florida remaining in contention it became apparent that one would win out while the other spot would go to a non-Florida team.

== Denver, Colorado ==
After previous failed attempts to bring Major League Baseball to the state of Colorado (most notably the Pittsburgh Pirates nearly relocating to Denver following the Pittsburgh drug trials in 1985), by the late 1980s a team seemed to be a possibility in Denver. Eugene Orza, associate general counsel of the Major League Baseball Players Association, stated that he expected Denver would receive one of the expansion franchises.

The Colorado Baseball Commission, led by banking executive Larry Varnell, was successful in getting Denver voters to approve a 0.1% sales tax to help finance a new baseball stadium. Also, an advisory committee was formed in 1990 by then-Governor of Colorado Roy Romer to recruit an ownership group. The group selected was led by John Antonucci, an Ohio beverage distributor, and Michael I. Monus, the head of the Phar-Mor drugstore chain. Local and regional companies—such as Erie Lake, Hensel Phelps Construction, KOA Radio, and the Rocky Mountain News—rounded out the group. The Denver group chose to call their franchise the Colorado Rockies, the same name used as the National Hockey League franchise that played in Denver from 1976 to 1982.

== Miami, Florida ==
U.S. Senator Connie Mack III from Florida, the grandson of baseball great Connie Mack and a member of the Senate Task Force on Major League Baseball, pushed Baseball Commissioner Fay Vincent to expand to Florida.

On March 7, 1990, Wayne Huizenga, CEO of Blockbuster Entertainment Corporation, announced he had purchased 15% of the NFL's Miami Dolphins and 50% of the Dolphins' home, Joe Robbie Stadium, for an estimated $30 million. Huizenga stated his intention to aggressively pursue an expansion franchise. MLB had announced a few months earlier that it intended to add two new teams to the National League. It was a foregone conclusion that one of them would be placed in Florida; the only question was whether Huizenga would beat out competing groups from Orlando and Tampa Bay. Orlando fielded a very spirited campaign bolstered by its family-oriented tourism industry. Tampa Bay already had a baseball park — the Florida Suncoast Dome in St. Petersburg, completed in 1990.

On June 10, 1990, Huizenga was awarded an expansion franchise in the National League (NL) for a $95 million expansion fee and the team began operations in 1993 as the Florida Marlins. The Miami group chose to call themselves the "Florida" Marlins to broaden their fanbase to the entire state, while reviving the nickname "Marlins" from previous minor league teams, the Miami Marlins of the International League from 1956 to 1960, and the Miami Marlins (1962–1970) and Miami Marlins (1982–1988) teams that played in the Florida State League.

== Finalization of expansion plans ==
In June 1991, the expansion committee accepted the bids of the Miami and Denver groups to debut in 1993. Expansion was approved unanimously by all teams in July 1991.

An expansion draft to stock both franchises was set for November 1992. Though previous expansions allowed the drafting of players from the same league only, Vincent declared that the American League would receive $42 million of the National League's $190 million in expansion revenue so that the AL would provide players in the National League expansion draft. In an attempt to win support in the American League and balance the vote, Vincent decreed that the AL owners were entitled to 22% of the $190 million take. This decision marked the first time in expansion history that leagues were required to share expansion revenue or provide players for another league's expansion draft. Vincent said the owners expanded to raise money to pay their collusion debt.

The Tampa Bay Baseball Group sued MLB for allegedly reneging on an agreement to grant an expansion team to Tampa. The suit was settled in 2003, five years after Tampa's major league team, the Devil Rays (now simply the Rays), began play in the American League.

== See also ==
- 1961 Major League Baseball expansion
- 1962 Major League Baseball expansion
- 1969 Major League Baseball expansion
- 1977 Major League Baseball expansion
- 1998 Major League Baseball expansion
