= 1998 Major League Baseball expansion =

Establishment of the 29th and 30th teams in MLB

The 1998 Major League Baseball expansion resulted in the establishment of Major League Baseball (MLB)'s 29th and 30th teams beginning play for the 1998 season. After initiating an expansion committee in March 1994, 27 groups representing nine cities submitted bids for the proposed expansion teams. After a yearlong process, on March 9, 1995, the league awarded the National League franchise to Phoenix and the American League franchise to Tampa Bay. The Arizona Diamondbacks and the Tampa Bay Devil Rays (currently the Tampa Bay Rays), subsequently began play for the 1998 season.

Locations of teams for the 1997 American League season
West Central East
Locations of teams for the 1997 National League seasons
West Central East
Locations of teams for the 1998 American League season
West Central East
Locations of teams for the 1998–1999 National League seasons
West Central East

== History ==
With the successes of the Colorado Rockies and Florida Marlins following the 1993 expansion, Major League Baseball by 1994 was looking to expand again from 28 to 30 teams. On March 2, 1994, MLB created an expansion committee to evaluate the feasibility of expansion. Although both Phoenix and Tampa Bay were believed to be overwhelming favorites for the franchises, other cities were invited to bid for the proposed franchises. The committee was headed by Boston Red Sox General Partner John Harrington, with others serving on the committee including Bill Giles of the Philadelphia Phillies, Jerry Reinsdorf of the Chicago White Sox, George Steinbrenner of the New York Yankees, Stanton Cook of the Chicago Cubs, Richard Jacobs of the Cleveland Indians, Stan Kasten of the Atlanta Braves, the president of the National League, Leonard S. Coleman, Jr., and the president of the American League, Bobby Brown.

By June, the league announced that all cities with interest in the proposed franchises should submit their intentions by June 24. By June 30, the committee released the nine communities that submitted information to MLB for the proposed franchises. Buffalo, Nashville, Northern Virginia, Orlando, Phoenix, Tampa Bay and Vancouver placed expansion requests. Other cities mentioned as potential expansion locations which did not officially submit an application to the league included Charlotte and Washington.

After whittling down the field to four finalists (Northern Virginia, Orlando, Phoenix and Tampa Bay), MLB announced Phoenix and Tampa Bay as the two expansion franchises on March 9, 1995. Announced to begin play for the 1998 season, each ownership group paid a $130 million expansion fee to enter the league. The ownership groups paid $32 million in July 1995, $25 million in July 1996, $40 million in July 1997 and $33 million in November 1997. In addition, the two expansion teams gave away their rights to $5 million from baseball's central fund for each of the five years following expansion (1998–2002).

The adding of the 29th and 30th team caused the American League and the National League to have fifteen teams each. Because of the odd number of teams, only seven games could possibly be scheduled in each league on any given day. Thus, one team in each league would have to be idle on any given day. This would have made it difficult for scheduling, in terms of travel days and the need to end the season before October. To continue intraleague-only play throughout most of the season, both leagues would need to carry an even number of teams, so the decision was made to move one club from the AL Central to the NL Central - it was ultimately then-acting Commissioner Bud Selig (who at the time also owned the Milwaukee Brewers) who agreed to have his own franchise change leagues.

The 1998 expansion remains the most recent to be conducted in Major League Baseball. MLB would later reverse the imbalance created by the 1998 expansion when, following the sale of the Houston Astros, the new owners agreed to move their franchise to the American League before the 2013 season. Following that transaction, MLB consequently altered its season structure so as to include interleague play throughout the regular season.

== See also ==
- 1961 Major League Baseball expansion
- 1962 Major League Baseball expansion
- 1969 Major League Baseball expansion
- 1977 Major League Baseball expansion
- 1993 Major League Baseball expansion
