= Continental League =

Proposed American baseball league

- Sport: Baseball
- Founded: July 27, 1959
- Founder: William Shea
- First season: 1961 (planned)
- Folded: August 2, 1960
- President: Branch Rickey
- Claim to fame: Compelled Major League Baseball to hasten its efforts to add expansion teams
- No. of teams: 8 (planned)
- Country: United States and Canada

The Continental League of Professional Baseball Clubs (known as the Continental League or CL) was a proposed third major league for baseball in the United States and Canada. The league was announced in 1959 and scheduled to begin play in the 1961 season. Unlike previous attempts at competitor leagues to Major League Baseball such as the Players' League (1890) and the Federal League (1913–1915), the Continental League sought membership and acceptance within organized baseball, as attempts to form outsider leagues could be quashed per a 1922 Supreme Court case that declared Major League Baseball exempt from federal antitrust laws. The league disbanded in August 1960 without playing a single game as a concession by lawyer William Shea as part of his negotiations with Major League Baseball to expand to incorporate at least eight new teams.

== History ==
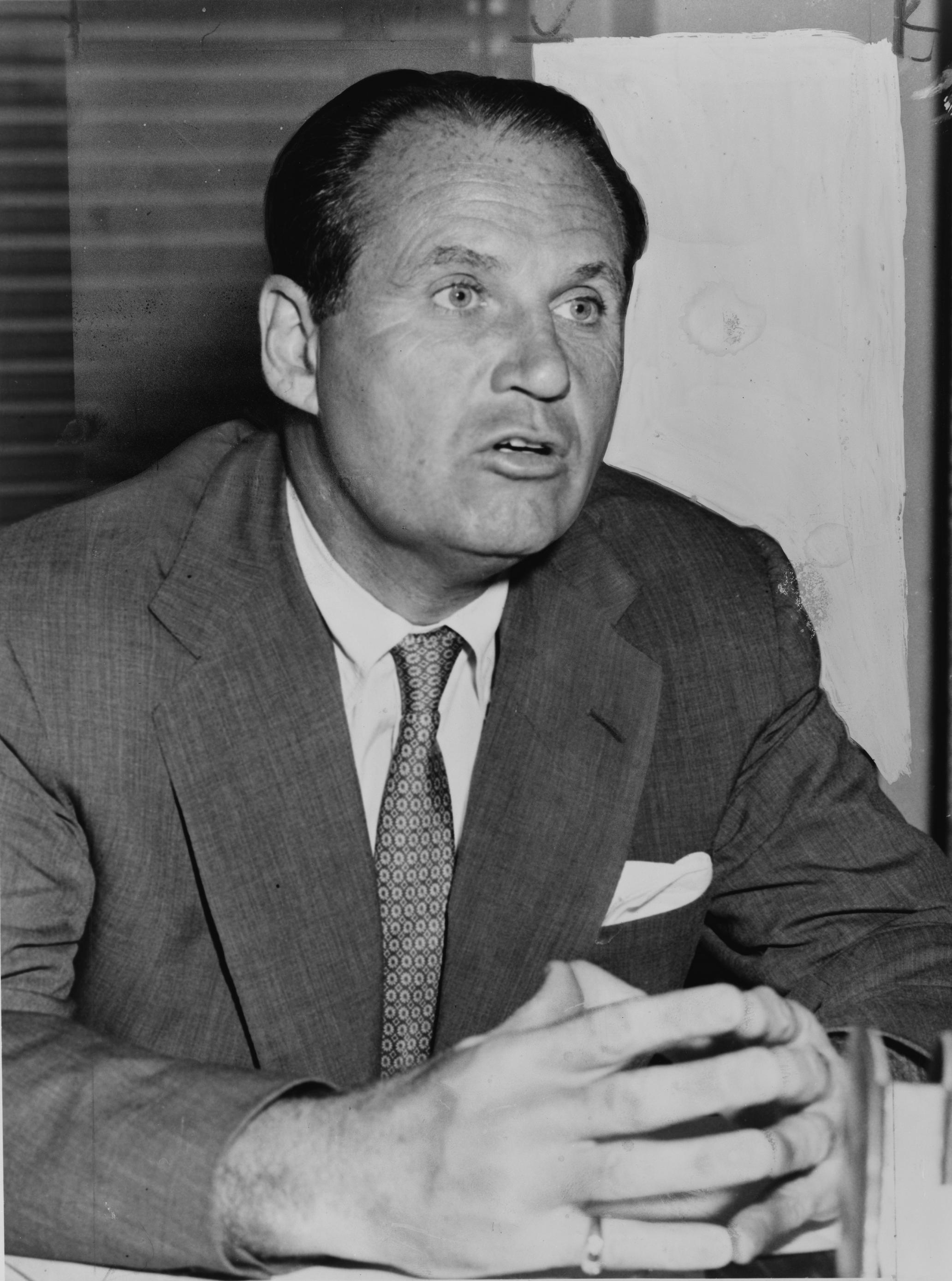
William Shea

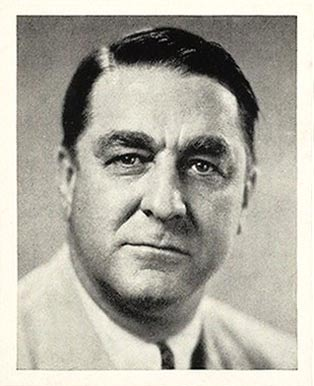
Branch Rickey

=== Background ===
The move of the New York Giants (to San Francisco) and the Brooklyn Dodgers (to Los Angeles) following the 1957 season led New York City mayor Robert F. Wagner Jr. to appoint a four-man committee to bring the National League back to the city in 1958. Early overtures to entice one of the other six existing NL teams – the Cincinnati Redlegs, Philadelphia Phillies, and Pittsburgh Pirates were reportedly approached – were abandoned.

=== New league announced ===
Continental League cities

The Continental League was the idea of attorney William Shea, who proposed it in November 1958. On July 27, 1959, the new league was formally announced, with teams in Denver, Houston, Minneapolis–St. Paul, New York City, and Toronto. The name of the league was said to have been the suggestion of Colorado senator Edwin C. Johnson.

Representing the team owners at the announcement were Bob Howsam (Denver), Craig F. Cullinan Jr. (Houston), Wheelock Whitney Jr. (Minneapolis–St. Paul), Dwight F. Davis Jr., who was representing the group headed by Joan Whitney Payson (New York), and Jack Kent Cooke (Toronto). Owners in each city had agreed to pay $50,000 to the league and committed to a capital investment of $2.5 million, not including stadium costs. A minimum seating capacity of 35,000 was established by the league for the venues in which its teams would play.

At least three other teams were expected to be in place before play began in 1961, and the league said it had received applications from 10 cities. The three that were later selected were Atlanta (announced December 8, 1959), Dallas–Fort Worth (announced December 22, 1959), and Buffalo (backed by Robert O. Swados and announced on January 29, 1960). Former Dodgers president Branch Rickey was named league president on August 18, 1959. Appearing in that capacity as a guest on the live CBS broadcast of What's My Line on Sunday, September 13, 1959, he pronounced the new league as "Inevitable as tomorrow morning."

On February 18, 1960, Rickey and Cooke announced an opening date of April 18, 1961.

=== Established leagues respond ===
The Major League Baseball commissioner's office was noncommittal on the issue. At that time, however, the American League and the National League enjoyed far more autonomy than they do today, answering more to their constituent owners (who were universally hostile to the new league) than to the Commissioner's Office. They reacted to the formation of the new league by announcing plans to expand by adding two teams in each of the existing leagues. Priority would be given, it was stated, to cities that did not have Major League Baseball. Accordingly, the NL placed one of its expansion teams in Houston (the then-Houston Colt .45s, now the American League Astros), a Continental League city without an existing Major League Baseball team.

Though the AL placed one of its expansion teams (the Washington Senators, now the Texas Rangers) in a previously existing Major League Baseball city (Washington, D.C.), this was done to replace the original Senators team, which had relocated to Minneapolis–St. Paul and became the Minnesota Twins. Like Houston, the Twin Cities of Minneapolis-St. Paul were a Continental League city without an existing Major League Baseball team.

However, notwithstanding aforementioned promise to expand to non-MLB cities, the National League owners had always had misgivings regarding their apparent ceding of the nation's largest market to the American League. Thus, once expansion was committed to, it was virtually inevitable the NL would return to New York City. The NL opted to offer its tenth franchise to the owners of the Continental League New York team, who immediately accepted, effectively killing any attempt to revive the proposed league. This franchise would become the New York Mets. The AL then followed by placing a second expansion team in Los Angeles, the Los Angeles Angels, giving the American League its first presence on the West Coast.

=== The league disbands ===
With Shea's mission to bring the National League back to New York successful, he stopped championing the Continental League's formation. The promise of expansion achieved the owners' desired effect; on August 2, 1960, the Continental League formally disbanded.

== Legacy ==
Baseball historians concur that even without the imminent threat of a third major league, Major League Baseball expansion would inevitably have happened due to such factors as pressure from Congress, the rapid growth of professional football, and the replacement of conservative long-tenured owners with younger businessmen who tended to be far more amenable to expansion. Nevertheless, the Continental League undoubtedly compelled MLB to hasten expansion by several years. Although Major League Baseball had succeeded in preventing the launch of an eight-team CL, it only did so by committing to eventually add eight franchises of its own. MLB finished honoring this commitment in 1969 when the AL and NL each added two more teams for a total of eight over the course of the decade, thereby matching the total number of new teams envisioned by the Continental League.

Although William Shea's efforts to create a third major league are not well known today, Shea Stadium, home of the New York Mets from 1964 to 2008, was named in his honor for his efforts in bringing National League baseball back to New York. Over the next two decades, Shea would become involved in efforts to secure second franchises for the New York metropolitan area in each of the other three major sports. He brokered the 1963 sale of the Titans of New York (now known as the New York Jets) from Harry Wismer to Sonny Werblin, ensuring the survival of the then-struggling American Football League franchise, and then worked to bring the New York Nets of the American Basketball Association to Nassau Coliseum. Shea also helped negotiate the mergers of both rival leagues with the established National Football League and National Basketball Association respectively. On the other hand, he actively opposed efforts to establish a World Hockey Association team on Long Island by successfully lobbying the National Hockey League and the New York Rangers to award an NHL franchise (the New York Islanders) to Nassau County.

Of the eight proposed Continental League cities, all but one eventually received relocated or expansion Major League Baseball franchises – Minneapolis–St. Paul in 1961, Houston and New York in 1962, Atlanta in 1966, Dallas–Fort Worth in 1972, Toronto in 1977, and Denver in 1993. Buffalo, although it made efforts to lure an MLB team to then-new Pilot Field in the early 1990s, has not succeeded in bringing Major League Baseball back. (There had been a major league team in Buffalo in the nineteenth century.) Buffalo remains home to the Buffalo Bisons, a team in the Triple-A International League. Buffalo also played host to the majority of Toronto Blue Jays home games for the 2020 season and part of the next season due to cross-border travel restrictions caused by the COVID-19 pandemic.
