= 1961 Cincinnati Reds season =

1961 Cincinnati Reds
- National League champions
- League: National League
- Ballpark: Crosley Field
- City: Cincinnati
- Owners: Powel Crosley Jr. Bill DeWitt
- General managers: Bill DeWitt
- Managers: Fred Hutchinson
- Television: WKRC (Ed Kennedy, Frank McCormick)
- Radio: WLW (Waite Hoyt, Jack Moran)

The 1961 Cincinnati Reds season was a season in American baseball. It consisted of the Reds winning the National League pennant with a 93–61 record, four games ahead of the runner-up Los Angeles Dodgers, but losing the World Series in five games to the New York Yankees. The Reds were managed by Fred Hutchinson, and played their home games at Crosley Field. The Reds were also the last team to win the National League in the 154-game schedule era, before going to a 162-game schedule a year later.

== Preseason ==
Cincinnati's road to the World Series was truly a remarkable one, as the Reds went through significant changes in a single season to improve from a team that won just 67 games and finished 28 games behind the eventual World Series Champion Pittsburgh Pirates in 1960. The architect of the turnaround was the Reds' new general manager Bill DeWitt, who left his role as president and general manager of the Detroit Tigers after the end of the 1960 season to replace Gabe Paul as the Reds' GM. Paul was hired as the general manager of the expansion Houston Colt .45s.

DeWitt, who had a short history of successful trades in Detroit including acquiring Norm Cash and Rocky Colavito, went to work at the 1960 Winter Meetings for Cincinnati. DeWitt found trade partners in the Milwaukee Braves and the Chicago White Sox. In essentially a three-team trade, the Reds acquired pitchers Joey Jay and Juan Pizarro for slick-fielding shortstop Roy McMillan on Dec. 15, 1960. On that same day, the Reds then traded Pizzaro and pitcher Cal McLish to the White Sox for third baseman Gene Freese. It was the fourth time Freese had been traded in 18 months. Most recently, the White Sox had acquired Freese from the Philadelphia Phillies for future all star Johnny Callison in December 1959.

The franchise was then forever changed when long-time Reds owner Powel Crosley Jr. died suddenly of a heart attack at his home in Cincinnati on March 28, 1961, 13 days before the start of the Reds' season. DeWitt eventually purchased 100% of the team ownership from Crosley's estate by year's end.

== Season recap ==
The Reds began the season with Freese at third base, sure-handed Eddie Kasko moved from third (where he played in 1960) to shortstop and long-time minor leaguer Jim Baumer at second base. Baumer was one of MLB's "feel good" stories. After playing in nine games with the White Sox in 1949 as an 18-year-old rookie, Baumer returned to the minor leagues and didn't make it back to the big league for 11 years. The Reds drafted Baumer during the Rule 5 draft after the Pittsburgh Pirates left him unprotected. After a solid spring training with the Reds, Baumer was named starting second baseman to open the season. As the season began, expectations were low for the Reds among baseball "experts." The Reds won their first three games, but then went into a slump, losing 10 of 12. To the surprise of many, it was the Reds' offense that struggled most. Baumer in particular was hitting just .125. DeWitt then made a bold move on April 27, 1961, trading all-star catcher Ed Bailey to the San Francisco Giants for second baseman Don Blasingame, catcher Bob Schmidt and journeyman pitcher Sherman Jones. Blasingame was inserted as starter at second base, and Baumer was traded to the Detroit Tigers on May 10 for backup first baseman Dick Gernert. Baumer never again played in the majors.

On April 30, the Reds won the second game of a double-header from the Pittsburgh Pirates to begin a 9-game winning streak. Exactly a month after the trade of Bailey, the Reds began another win streak, this time six games, to improve to 26–16. Those streaks were part of a stretch where the Reds won 50 of 70 games to improve to 55–30. Cincinnati led Los Angeles by five games at the All Star break.

After the break, the Dodgers got hot and the Reds floundered. After the games of August 13, Los Angeles was 69-40 and led Cincinnati (70–46) by 2 1/2 games, but six in the loss column as the Dodgers had played seven fewer games than the Reds due to multiple rainouts. On August 15, the Reds went into Los Angeles to begin a three-game, two-day series highlighted by a double-header. In the first game of the series, Reds' righty Joey Jay bested Sandy Koufax and the Dodgers, 5–2, as Eddie Kasko had four hits and Frank Robinson drove in two for Cincinnati. In the Wednesday double-header, knuckle-baller Bob Purkey threw a four-hit shutout as the Reds won Game 1, 6–0. In Game 2, Freese hit two home runs off Dodgers' lefty Johnny Podres and Jim O'Toole hurled a two-hitter as the Reds completed the sweep with an 8–0 victory. The Reds left Los Angeles with a half-game lead. It was the Dodgers' fourth-straight loss in what became a 10-game losing streak to put the Dodgers in a hole, while the Reds stayed in first-place the rest of the season.

The Reds clinched their first pennant in 21 years on Sept. 26 when they beat the Cubs, 6–3, in the afternoon and the Dodgers lost to the Pittsburgh Pirates, 8–0, in the second game of a doubleheader. The Reds earned a chance to face the mighty New York Yankees in the 1961 World Series.

Outfielders Frank Robinson and Vada Pinson led the Reds offense while starting pitchers Bob Purkey, Jim O'Toole and newcomer Joey Jay were the staff standouts. Robinson (37 homers, 124 RBI, 117 runs scored, 22 stolen bases, .323 average) was named National League MVP. Pinson (208 hits, .343 average, 101 runs scored, 23 stolen bases) and a Gold Glove recipient, finished third in MVP voting. Purkey won 16 games, O'Toole won 19 and Jay won an NL-best 21 games. Jay also finished fifth in NL MVP voting, one spot ahead of future Hall of Famer Willie Mays who hit 40 home runs and drove in 123 for the Giants.

At a position (3B) that the Reds had received little offensive production from in the recent years leading up to 1961, Freese provided a major boost, slugging 26 home runs and driving in 87 runs to go with a .277 average.

Hutchinson, a former MLB pitcher, was masterful in his handling of the pitching staff as well as juggling a lineup that included part-timers (and former slugging standouts) Gus Bell, Wally Post (20, 57, .294) as well as Jerry Lynch (13, 50, .315). For the second straight season, Lynch led the National League with 19 pinch hits. Hutchinson was named Manager of the Year.

== Player moves ==
- December 3, 1960: Second baseman Billy Martin was sold to the Milwaukee Braves.
- December 14, 1960: Catcher Joe Azcue was sold to the Milwaukee Braves.
- December 15, 1960: Pitchers Joey Jay and Juan Pizarro were acquired from the Milwaukee Braves in a trade for shortstop Roy McMillan.
- December 15, 1960: Third baseman Gene Freese was acquired from the Chicago White Sox in a trade for pitchers Juan Pizarro and Cal McLish.
- January 21, 1961: Pitchers John Tsitouris and Johnny Briggs were acquired from the Kansas City Athletics in a trade for pitcher Joe Nuxhall.
- February 24, 1961: Catcher Frank House was sold to the Baltimore Orioles.
- April 27, 1961: Second baseman Don Blasingame, catcher Bob Schmidt and pitcher Sherman Jones were acquired in a trade with the San Francisco Giants for catcher Ed Bailey.
- May 10, 1961: First baseman Dick Gernert was acquired from the Detroit Tigers in a trade for infielder Jim Baumer.
- July 21, 1961: Pitcher Ken Johnson was acquired from the Kansas City Athletics for cash.
- September 16, 1961: Pitcher Dave Sisler and cash were acquired from the Washington Senators for pitcher Claude Osteen.

=== Season standings ===
National League
Team	W	L	Pct.	GB	Home	Road
Cincinnati Reds	93	61	.604	—	47‍–‍30	46‍–‍31
Los Angeles Dodgers	89	65	.578	4	45‍–‍32	44‍–‍33
San Francisco Giants	85	69	.552	8	45‍–‍32	40‍–‍37
Milwaukee Braves	83	71	.539	10	45‍–‍32	38‍–‍39
St. Louis Cardinals	80	74	.519	13	48‍–‍29	32‍–‍45
Pittsburgh Pirates	75	79	.487	18	38‍–‍39	37‍–‍40
Chicago Cubs	64	90	.416	29	40‍–‍37	24‍–‍53
Philadelphia Phillies	47	107	.305	46	22‍–‍55	25‍–‍52

=== Record vs. opponents ===
1961 National League record Sources:
Team	CHC	CIN	LAD	MIL	PHI	PIT	SF	STL
Chicago	—	12–10	7–15	9–13–1	13–9	11–11	5–17	7–15–1
Cincinnati	10–12	—	12–10	15–7	19–3	11–11	12–10	14–8
Los Angeles	15–7	10–12	—	12–10	17–5	13–9	10–12	12–10
Milwaukee	13–9–1	7–15	10–12	—	16–6	12–10	11–11	14–8
Philadelphia	9–13	3–19	5–17	6–16	—	7–15	8–14–1	9–13
Pittsburgh	11–11	11–11	9–13	10–12	15–7	—	10–12	9–13
San Francisco	17–5	10–12	12–10	11–11	14–8–1	12–10	—	9–13
St. Louis	15–7–1	8–14	10–12	8–14	13–9	13–9	13–9	—

=== Roster ===
1961 Cincinnati Reds
Roster
Pitchers: 34 Marshall Bridges; 42 Jim Brosnan; 44 Bill Henry; 47 Jay Hook; 41 Ken Hunt; 30 Joey Jay; 40 Ken Johnson; 34 Sherman Jones; 46 Jim Maloney; 38 Howie Nunn; 31 Jim O'Toole; 32 Claude Osteen; 37 Bob Purkey	Catchers: 6 Ed Bailey; 6 Johnny Edwards; 9 Darrell Johnson; 6 Bob Schmidt; 8 Jerry Zimmerman; Infielders: 11 Jim Baumer; 19 Don Blasingame; 16 Leo Cárdenas; 17 Elio Chacón; 18 Gordy Coleman; 11 Cliff Cook; 12 Gene Freese; 15 Dick Gernert; 14 Willie Jones; 10 Eddie Kasko	Outfielders: 25 Gus Bell; 21 Joe Gaines; 24 Jerry Lynch; 28 Vada Pinson; 29 Wally Post; 20 Frank Robinson; 27 Pete Whisenant; Other batters: 27 Harry Anderson; 9 Hal Bevan	Manager: 1 Fred Hutchinson; Coaches: 23 Otis Douglas; 4 Reggie Otero; 2 Dick Sisler; 3 Jim Turner; 27 Pete Whisenant

== Player stats ==
= Indicates team leader

= Indicates league leader

=== Batting ===
==== Starters by position ====
Note: Pos = Position; G = Games played; AB = At bats; H = Hits; Avg. = Batting average; HR = Home runs; RBI = Runs batted in

Pos	Player	G	AB	H	Avg.	HR	RBI
C	Jerry Zimmerman	76	204	42	.204	0	10
1B	Gordy Coleman	150	520	149	.287	26	87
2B	Don Blasingame	123	450	100	.222	1	21
3B	Gene Freese	152	575	159	.277	26	87
SS	Eddie Kasko	126	469	127	.271	2	27
LF	Wally Post	99	282	83	.294	20	57
CF	Vada Pinson	154	607	208	.343	16	87
RF	Frank Robinson	153	545	176	.323	37	124

==== Other batters ====
Note: Pos = Position; G = Games played; AB = At bats; H = Hits; Avg. = Batting average; HR = Home runs; RBI = Runs batted in

Pos	Player	G	AB	H	Avg.	HR	RBI
OF	Gus Bell	103	235	60	.255	3	33
SS	Leo Cárdenas	74	198	61	.308	5	24
LF	Jerry Lynch	96	181	57	.315	13	50
C	Johnny Edwards	52	145	27	.186	2	14
2B	Elio Chacón	61	132	35	.265	2	5
C	Bob Schmidt	27	70	9	.129	1	4
1B	Dick Gernert	40	63	19	.302	0	7
C	Darrell Johnson	20	54	17	.315	1	6
C	Ed Bailey	12	43	13	.302	0	2
2B	Jim Baumer	10	24	3	.125	0	0
UT	Pete Whisenant	26	15	3	.200	0	1
3B	Willie Jones	9	7	0	.000	0	0
3B	Cliff Cook	4	5	0	.000	0	0
PH	Harry Anderson	4	4	1	.250	0	0
OF	Joe Gaines	4	3	0	.000	0	0
PH	Hal Bevan	3	3	1	.333	1	1

=== Pitching ===
==== Starting pitchers ====
Note: G = Games pitched; CG = Complete games; IP = Innings pitched; W = Wins; L = Losses; ERA = Earned run average; SO = Strikeouts

Pitcher	G	CG	IP	W	L	ERA	SO
Jim O'Toole	39	11	253.2	19	9	3.10	178
Joey Jay	34	14	247.1	21	10	3.53	157
Bob Purkey	36	13	246.1	16	12	3.73	116
Ken Hunt	29	4	136.1	9	10	3.96	75
Ken Johnson	15	3	83.0	6	2	3.25	42

==== Other pitchers ====
Note: G = Games pitched; CG = Complete games; IP = Innings pitched; W = Wins; SV = Saves; ERA = Earned run average; SO = Strikeouts

Pitcher	G	CG	IP	W	SV	ERA	SO
Jim Maloney	27	1	94.2	6	2	4.37	57
Jay Hook	22	0	62.2	1	0	7.76	36
Marshall Bridges	13	0	20.2	0	0	7.84	17

==== Relief pitchers ====
Note: G = Games pitched; IP = Innings pitched; W = Wins; L = Losses; SV = Saves; ERA = Earned run average; SO = Strikeouts

Pitcher	G	IP	W	L	SV	ERA	SO
Jim Brosnan	53	80.0	10	4	16	3.04	40
Bill Henry	47	53.1	2	1	16	2.19	53
Sherman Jones	24	55.0	1	1	2	4.42	32
Howie Nunn	24	37.2	2	1	0	3.58	26
Claude Osteen	1	0.1	0	0	0	0.00	0

== 1961 World Series ==
AL New York Yankees (4) vs. NL Cincinnati Reds (1)
Game	Score	Date	Location	Attendance
1	Reds – 0, Yankees– 2	October 4	Yankee Stadium	62,397
2	Reds– 6, Yankees – 2	October 5	Yankee Stadium	63,083
3	Yankees– 3, Reds – 2	October 7	Crosley Field	32,589
4	Yankees– 7, Reds – 0	October 8	Crosley Field	32,589
5	Yankees– 13, Reds – 5	October 9	Crosley Field	32,589

== Awards and honors ==
- Fred Hutchinson, Associated Press NL Manager of the Year
- Frank Robinson, National League Most Valuable Player
- Vada Pinson, Outfield, National League Gold Glove

== Farm system ==
Level	Team	League	Manager
AAA	Indianapolis Indians	American Association	Cot Deal
AAA	Jersey City Jerseys	International League	Nap Reyes
A	Columbia Reds	Sally League	Ted Beard and Hersh Freeman
B	Topeka Reds	Illinois–Indiana–Iowa League	Dave Bristol
D	Tampa Tarpons	Florida State League	Johnny Vander Meer
D	Geneva Redlegs	New York–Penn League	Karl Kuehl

LEAGUE CHAMPIONS: Topeka, Tampa
