= 1972 Baseball Hall of Fame balloting =

Elections to the Baseball Hall of Fame

National Baseball

Hall of Fame and Museum
- New inductees: 8
- via BBWAA: 3
- via Veterans Committee: 3
- via Negro Leagues Committee: 2
- Total inductees: 134
- Induction date: August 7, 1972

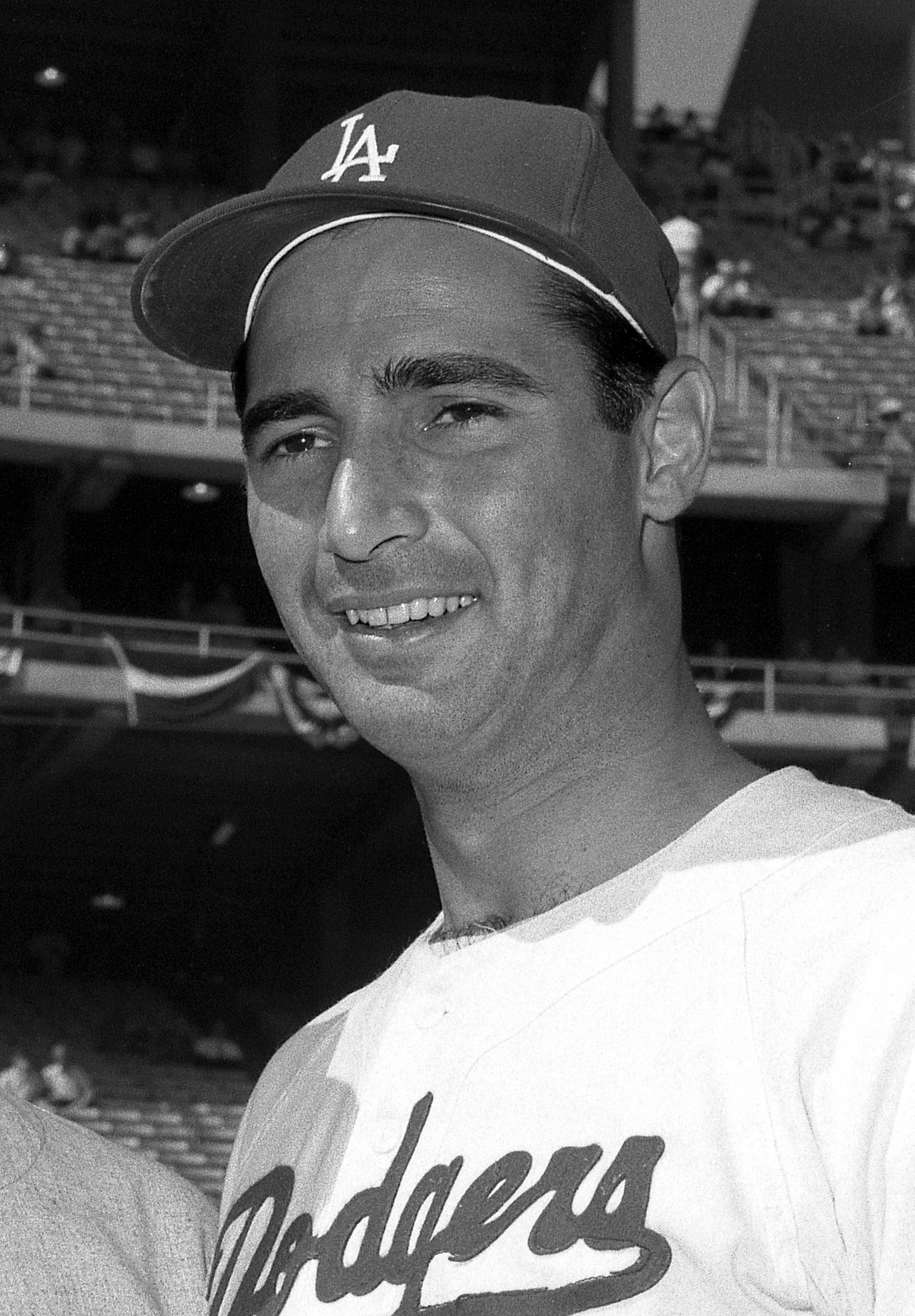
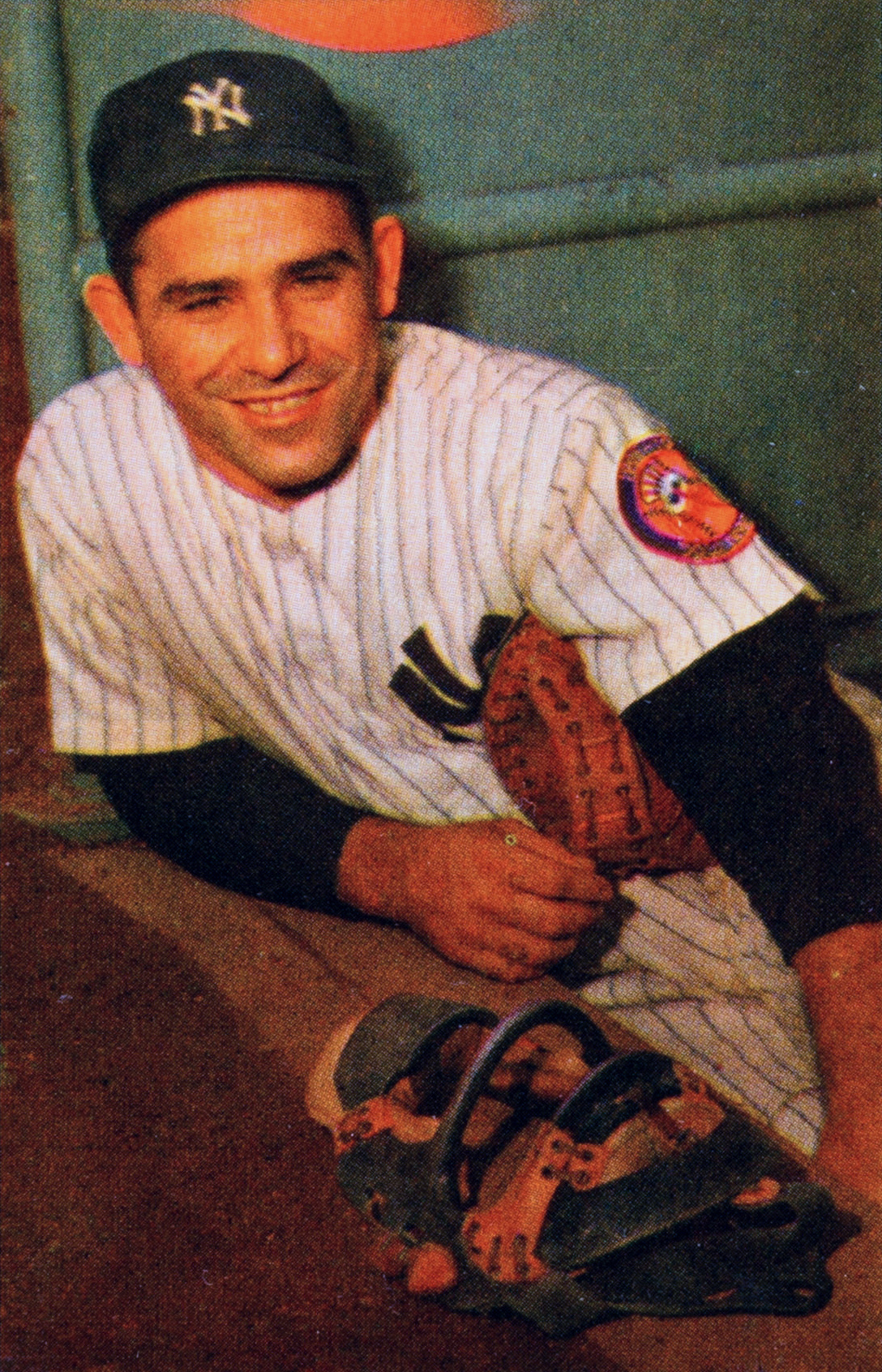
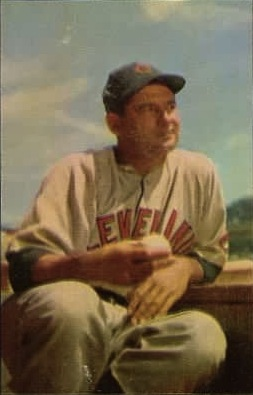
1972 BBWAA inductees (L-R): Sandy Koufax, Yogi Berra, and Early Wynn

Elections to the Baseball Hall of Fame for 1972 followed the system established one year earlier. The Baseball Writers' Association of America (BBWAA) voted by mail to select from recent major league players and elected three: Yogi Berra, Sandy Koufax, and Early Wynn. The Veterans Committee met in closed sessions to consider executives, managers, umpires, and earlier major league players. It also selected three people: Lefty Gomez, Will Harridge, and Ross Youngs. The Negro Leagues Committee met for the second time and selected Josh Gibson and Buck Leonard. A formal induction ceremony was held in Cooperstown, New York, on August 7, 1972, with Commissioner of Baseball Bowie Kuhn presiding.

== BBWAA election ==
The BBWAA was authorized to elect players active in 1952 or later, but not after 1966; the ballot included candidates from the 1971 ballot who received at least 5% of the vote but were not elected, along with selected players, chosen by a screening committee, whose last appearance was in 1966. All 10-year members of the BBWAA were eligible to vote.

Voters were instructed to cast votes for up to 10 candidates; any candidate receiving votes on at least 75% of the ballots would be honored with induction to the Hall. The ballot consisted of 46 players; a total of 396 ballots were cast, with 297 votes required for election. A total of 3,083 individual votes were cast, an average of 7.79 per ballot.

Candidates who were eligible for the first time are indicated here with a dagger (†). The three candidates who received at least 75% of the vote and were elected are indicated in bold italics; candidates who have since been elected in subsequent elections are indicated in italics.

Charlie Keller was on the ballot for the final time.

Player	Votes	Percent	Change
**Sandy Koufax**†	344	86.9	-
**Yogi Berra**	339	85.6	▲18.4%
**Early Wynn**	301	76.0	▲9.3%
Ralph Kiner	235	59.3	▲0.4%
Gil Hodges	161	40.7	▼9.3%
Johnny Mize	157	39.6	▼4.0%
Enos Slaughter	149	37.6	▼8.2%
Pee Wee Reese	129	32.6	▼2.7%
Marty Marion	120	30.3	▼3.9%
Bob Lemon	117	29.5	▲4.5%
George Kell	115	29.0	▼0.2%
Allie Reynolds	105	26.5	▼4.1%
Red Schoendienst	104	26.3	▼7.9%
Phil Rizzuto	103	26.0	▼0.4%
Hal Newhouser	92	23.2	▼2.9%
Duke Snider	84	21.2	▼3.5%
Nellie Fox	64	16.2	▲5.4%
Phil Cavarretta	61	15.4	▼7.7%
Alvin Dark	55	13.9	▼1.1%
Dom DiMaggio	36	9.1	▲4.9%
Bobo Newsom	31	7.8	▲3.1%
Charlie Keller	24	6.1	▲2.2%
Johnny Sain	21	5.3	▲2.2%
Mickey Vernon	12	3.0	▼0.3%
Richie Ashburn	11	2.8	-
Ted Kluszewski	10	2.5	-
Bobby Thomson	10	2.5	▲1.4%
Harvey Haddix	9	2.3	▼0.5%
Roy McMillan†	9	2.3	-
Bobby Shantz	9	2.3	▲0.9%
Walker Cooper	8	2.0	▲0.1%
Bobby Richardson†	8	2.0	-
Don Newcombe	7	1.8	▼0.4%
Harry Brecheen	5	1.3	▼0.6%
Dutch Leonard	5	1.3	▲0.5%
Carl Erskine	4	1.0	▲0.2%
Gil McDougald	4	1.0	▼0.1%
Billy Pierce	4	1.0	▼0.9%
Vic Raschi	4	1.0	▲0.4%
Vic Wertz	4	1.0	▲0.4%
Vic Power	3	0.8	▲0.2%
Roy Sievers	3	0.8	▼0.3%
Carl Furillo	2	0.5	▼0.9&
Ed Lopat	2	0.5	▼0.6%
Preacher Roe	2	0.5	▼0.3%
Jackie Jensen	1	0.3	▼0.3%

Key to colors
Elected to the Hall. These individuals are also indicated in **bold italics**.
Players who were elected in future elections. These individuals are also indicated in plain italics.
Players not yet elected who returned on the 1973 ballot.
Eliminated from future BBWAA voting. These individuals remain eligible for future Veterans Committee consideration.

Players eligible for the first time who were not included on the ballot were: Joe Adcock, Ed Bailey, Don Blasingame, Frank Bolling, Wes Covington, Roger Craig, Del Crandall, Joe Cunningham, Gene Freese, Bob Friend, Jim Gilliam, Ray Herbert, Billy Hoeft, Joey Jay, Eddie Kasko, Marty Keough, Héctor López, Jerry Lynch, Frank Malzone, Félix Mantilla, Joe Nuxhall, Bob Purkey, Steve Ridzik, Ed Roebuck, Bob Skinner and Frank Thomas.

== J. G. Taylor Spink Award ==
Frank Graham (1893–1965) received the J. G. Taylor Spink Award honoring a baseball writer. The award was voted at the December 1971 meeting of the BBWAA, and included in the summer 1972 ceremonies.
