= Jim Baumer =

American baseball player (1931–1996)

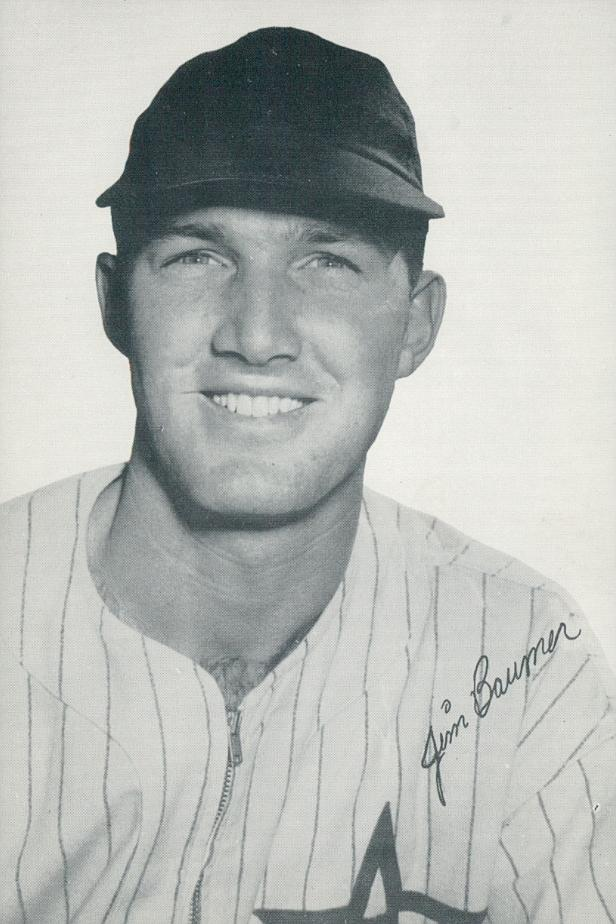
- Baumer circa 1957
- Infielder
- Born: January 29, 1931; Tulsa, Oklahoma, U.S.
- Died: July 8, 1996 (aged 65); Paoli, Pennsylvania, U.S.
- Batted: Right Threw: Right

Professional debut
- MLB: September 14, 1949, for the Chicago White Sox
- NPB: April 6, 1963, for the Nishitetsu Lions

Last appearance
- MLB: April 27, 1961, for the Cincinnati Reds
- NPB: 1967, for the Nishitetsu Lions

MLB statistics
- Batting average: .206
- Home runs: 0
- Runs batted in: 2

NPB statistics
- Batting average: .251
- Home runs: 82
- Runs batted in: 267
- Stats at Baseball Reference

Teams
- Chicago White Sox (1949); Cincinnati Reds (1961); Nishitetsu Lions (1963–1967)

James Sloan Baumer (January 29, 1931 – July 8, 1996) was an American professional baseball player, scout, and front office executive. A right-handed-hitting infielder born in Tulsa, Oklahoma, Baumer was a graduate of Broken Arrow Senior High. During his active career, he stood 6 feet 2 inches (1.88 m) tall and weighed 185 pounds (84 kg).

Baumer had a highly unusual Major League playing career. A power-hitting shortstop, he was signed by the Chicago White Sox for $50,000 as a "bonus baby" at the age of 18 in 1949, days before the New York Yankees signed fellow Oklahoma prospect Mickey Mantle for $1,500.

The bonus rule at the time forced Baumer to start his career in the major leagues with Chicago, where he hit .400 (four hits in 10 at bats in 1949, including a double and a triple). He then disappeared into the minor leagues for the decade of the 1950s, and did not return to MLB until, as a 30-year-old, he had a brief trial with the 1961 Cincinnati Reds. Baumer appeared in ten of Cincinnati's first 13 games, eight as the Reds' starting second baseman, but collected only three singles and batted .125. The day of his last MLB game, April 27, 1961, the Reds acquired second baseman Don Blasingame in a trade with the San Francisco Giants. Baumer was traded to the Detroit Tigers for first baseman Dick Gernert on May 10, and returned to the minor leagues.

Overall, Baumer batted .206 in 18 MLB games and 34 at bats, with two runs batted in. After his big league career, Baumer played for the Nishitetsu Lions in Japan from 1963 until 1967.

When his playing career ended, Baumer became a scout with the Houston Astros and Milwaukee Brewers, and was promoted to Milwaukee's director of scouting in 1974. The following season, he succeeded Jim Wilson as the Brewers' general manager. Baumer's most successful transaction during his three-year tenure as GM was his acquisition of first baseman Cecil Cooper from the Boston Red Sox following the 1976 season. However, the Brewers struggled on the field, and after their eighth straight losing season in Milwaukee in 1977, Baumer was fired and replaced by Harry Dalton.

He then joined the Philadelphia Phillies as a scout, and was promoted to director of the Phils' scouting and farm system operations in 1981. Two years later, Baumer was named a team vice president. His role diminished after a front-office purge in 1988, but he remained with the Phillies as an area scout.

Baumer died at age 65 in the Philadelphia suburb of Paoli, Pennsylvania.

Preceded by Jim Wilson	Milwaukee Brewers General manager 1975–1977	Succeeded by Harry Dalton
