= Don Blasingame =

American baseball player (1932–2005)

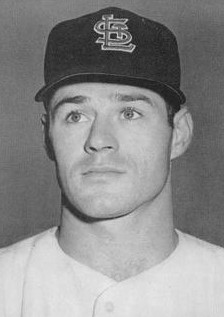
- Second baseman
- Born: March 16, 1932; Corinth, Mississippi, U.S.
- Died: April 13, 2005 (aged 73); Fountain Hills, Arizona, U.S.
- Batted: Left Threw: Right

MLB debut
- September 20, 1955, for the St. Louis Cardinals

Last MLB appearance
- August 27, 1966, for the Kansas City Athletics

MLB statistics
- Batting average: .258
- Home runs: 21
- Runs batted in: 308
- Stats at Baseball Reference

Teams
- St. Louis Cardinals (1955–1959); San Francisco Giants (1960–1961); Cincinnati Reds (1961–1963); Washington Senators (1963–1966); Kansas City Athletics (1966); Nankai Hawks (1967–1969)

Career highlights and awards
- All-Star (1958)

Donald Lee Blasingame (March 16, 1932 – April 13, 2005), nicknamed "Blazer", was an American professional baseball player. He played as a second baseman in Major League Baseball (MLB) for the St. Louis Cardinals (1955–1959), San Francisco Giants (1960–1961), Cincinnati Reds (1961–1963), Washington Senators (1963–1966), and Kansas City Athletics (1966). Blasingame threw right-handed, batted left-handed and was listed as 5 feet 10 inches (1.78 m) tall and 160 pounds (73 kg).

Born and raised in Corinth, Mississippi, Blasingame signed with the Cardinals in 1953 after a stint in the United States Army. He made his debut for the team in September 1955 and took over the second base job from Red Schoendienst in 1956. In 1957, he finished twelfth in National League Most Valuable Player Award voting, and he reached his only All-Star Game in 1958. He played one more season for the Cardinals in 1959 before getting traded to the Giants. With San Francisco, Blasingame's batting average was significantly lower than it had been with St. Louis, and he lost the second base job in 1961, then was traded early in the season to the Reds. He made it to the World Series with the Reds during his first year and batted .281 for them in 1962. In 1963, he lost the second base role to Pete Rose and was traded to the Senators midseason. Blasingame served as Washington's second baseman until 1966, platooned with Chuck Cottier for the first half of that year, then went to the Athletics and spent a month with them as a pinch hitter to finish his major league career.

After that, Blasingame went to Japan. He spent three seasons playing with the Nankai Hawks, then coached the team for several years. From 1979 to 1980, he managed the Hanshin Tigers, and from 1981 to 1982, he managed Nankai. Returning to the U.S., he served as a minor league coordinator for the Philadelphia Phillies afterward. In his later years, he lived in Scottsdale, Arizona.

== Early life ==
Blasingame was born on March 16, 1932, in Corinth, Mississippi. He was the third boy and fourth child of Chester Henry "Doc" and Ottie May Blasingame. Doc was a butcher in West Corinth at a local meat market. Don attended Corinth High School and excelled playing baseball for them and for American Legion Post 6 in Corinth. He helped Corinth High win the state championship in 1949. The Houston Buffaloes of the Class AA Texas League tried him out during 1951 spring training, but he went off to serve in the United States Army for two years during the Korean War. Once his military service ended, he signed with the St. Louis Cardinals in 1953.

Blasingame went to David Lipscomb College in his offseasons between 1952 and 1953 and again between 1953 and 1954.

== Minor league career ==
Blasingame's first professional team was the Winston-Salem Cardinals of the Class B Carolina League. He had 141 hits in 131 games, along with seven home runs and a .290 batting average. For the following season, he went to spring training with the Buffaloes. He suffered two injuries in spring training, burning his hand by grabbing a light bulb in a hotel room, then tripping over a base the day before the season, causing him to miss the first two weeks. However, he impressed the team enough to make their roster. "Can you imagine what a favorite he'll be if he keeps on looking like he does now?" manager Dixie Walker asked.

Blasingame batted .315 in 144 games (575 at bats) with Houston in 1954, racking up 181 hits, five home runs, and 51 runs batted in (RBI). He demonstrated great speed with the team, stealing 34 bases and earning the nickname "Don Blazing-game". Eventually shortened to "Blazer", the nickname would follow him for the rest of his career. Walker said, "He wears the dirtiest uniform on the club. That's the highest tribute I can pay him." Houston won the Texas League pennant and played the Atlanta Crackers in the Dixie Series after the season.

Though he had played shortstop these seasons, Blasingame was moved to second base during winter ball in Cuba after the 1954 season, groomed to replace Red Schoendienst at the position once his tenure with the Cardinals ended. He played 132 games (497 at bats) with the Omaha Cardinals of the Class AAA American Association, batting .302 with 150 hits, three home runs, 46 RBI, and 17 stolen bases, earning a September call-up to the St. Louis Cardinals.

== Major league career ==
=== St. Louis Cardinals ===
Blasingame made his major league debut at age 23 on September 20, 1955, in a 2–0 Cardinals win over the Chicago Cubs. Starting at second base and batting leadoff, his first career at bat resulted in his first hit, a single off Sam Jones, and he scored on a Solly Hemus home run. He appeared in five games that fall for the Cardinals, reaching base 12 times in 23 opportunities.

In 1956, Blasingame began the season on the bench for three games, then took over as the Cardinal shortstop from Alex Grammas. He batted .263 in his first 50 games, through June 12. Two days later, the Cardinals traded Schoendienst to the New York Giants, opening the door for Blasingame to take over at that position. He spent the rest of the year at second base and finished the season batting .261 with 153 hits, 94 runs, and 27 RBI in 150 games (587 at bats). He stole eight bases but was caught an equal number of times.

Blasingame enjoyed his best season in 1957, when he hit .271 and posted career-highs in home runs (8), RBI (58), runs (101), hits (176) and stolen bases (21, third in the league). His first home run eventually came on May 12, against Red Murff, though it was in a 10–4 loss to the Milwaukee Braves. September 4, he had an even better game against the Braves. With the game tied 4–4 in the 12th inning, Blasingame hit a double against Don McMahon with one out. He then stole third base, forcing McMahon to intentionally walk the next two hitters to set up a force play. An error by Bob Hazle allowed Blasingame to score, giving the Cardinals a 5–4 win. Another highlight came on June 12 that year, when he had four RBIs, including a two-RBI single in the 10th inning, helping the Cardinals beat the Pittsburgh Pirates 10–3 in the first game of a doubleheader. Used as a leadoff man, Blasingame led the National League (NL) with 650 at bats. Defensively in 1957, Blasingame led NL second basemen in assists and double plays. He tied for 12th in NL Most Valuable Player Award voting after the season, with Ed Bouchee of the Philadelphia Phillies.

In 1958, Blasingame batted .276 in the first half of the season, getting named to the National League All-Star team for the only time in his career. Bill Mazeroski played the whole game for the NL at second, but Blasingame did make an appearance, flying out when he pinch-hit for Warren Spahn in the fourth inning. He had four hits and two RBI in an 8–7 victory over the San Francisco Giants on August 6. Sports Illustrated reported he was "hurt a lot" that year, but he still appeared in 143 of 154 games. He batted .274 with 71 runs scored, 19 doubles, 10 triples (a career high), two home runs, and 20 steals.

Blasingame only hit one home run in 1959, in a 5–3 loss to the Los Angeles Dodgers, but it was against Sandy Koufax. He had three hits, scored three times, and drove in two runs during a June 9, 12–3 victory over Milwaukee. On July 19, he had four hits and scored twice in a 9–5 victory, also over Milwaukee. He finished the season with a .289 batting average and 26 doubles, both career highs. While he only had 24 RBI, he scored 90 runs. He stole 15 bases but was caught a league-leading 15 times as well.

=== San Francisco Giants and Cincinnati Reds ===
After the 1959 season, on December 15, Blasingame was traded to the San Francisco Giants for Daryl Spencer (the team's previous second baseman) and Leon Wagner. The Giants had discussed the possibility of acquiring Blasingame from the Cardinals since December of the previous season; they hoped he could shore up their error-prone infield. He served as the team's leadoff man, just as he had in St. Louis. However, Blasingame failed to live up to expectations with the Giants. His batting average dropped to .235, the lowest of his major league career. In 136 games (523 at bats), Blasingame had 123 hits, two home runs, and 31 RBI. He did see improvement as a base stealer, as he was only caught stealing twice in 16 attempts.

In 1961, Blasingame lost the second base job to rookie Chuck Hiller. He was only used three times in the first two weeks, all as a pinch-hitter, before getting traded with Bob Schmidt to the Cincinnati Reds for Ed Bailey and a player to be named later (Sherman Jones).

"We needed some one to pull the infield together...Blasingame fit the bill," said Reds' manager Fred Hutchinson. Three days after Blasingame's arrival in Cincinnati, the Reds went on a nine-game winning streak, shooting from last place to the upper portions of the NL standings. Blasingame's average continued to dip in 1961, though, falling to .222. By the end of the year, he was losing playing time to prospect Elio Chacón. In 123 games (450 at bats), Blasingame had 100 hits, one home run, and 21 RBI, only stealing four bases on the season. With the Reds, Blasingame appeared in the 1961 World Series, playing in three games with one hit in seven at-bats as the Reds fell in five games to the New York Yankees.

Chacón was taken by the New York Mets in the 1961 Major League Baseball (MLB) expansion draft, leaving Blasingame without competition for the Reds' second base job in 1962. On April 18, he had three hits, four runs, and two RBI in a 14–0 victory over the Dodgers. On May 24, he had four hits, including a double and a triple, in a 5–0 victory over the Houston Colt .45's. He had five hits against the Cubs in a 7–5 victory over them in Game 1 of a doubleheader held on September 5. In 141 games (494 at bats), Blasingame had 139 hits, scored 77 runs, had two home runs, and drove in 35. Once again, he stole four bases. His extra-base hit totals were down, as he had nine doubles and seven triples.

By 1963, Blasingame's defense was no longer what it had been. Sports Illustrated noted that he was "competent" but said he had "trouble making the double play." The Reds had a new second base prospect in spring training that year named Pete Rose; Blasingame was the only member of the team who thought he would make the roster. Rose went on to win Rookie of the Year honors that year. Though Rose won the second base job, he lost it temporarily to Blasingame after batting .130 in the first six games of the year. Blasingame played the next eight games there but batted .160 and lost the job to Rose again. Seldom used after that, Blasingame was traded to the Washington Senators on July 1 for Jim Coates.

=== Washington Senators and Kansas City Athletics ===
The Senators acquired Blasingame to replace Chuck Cottier at second base; Cottier was only batting .200 through the end of June. Blasingame finished the 1963 season strong, batting .316 in his final 32 games beginning August 24. In 69 games (254 at bats) with the Senators, he batted .256 with 29 runs scored, 65 hits, two home runs, 12 RBI, and three stolen bases. In 87 games (285 at bats) between Cincinnati and Washington, he batted .246 with 33 runs scored and 70 hits (he had no home runs, RBI, or stolen bases with the Reds).

Blasingame remained the Senators' second baseman in 1964. He had three hits and scored two runs, including the winning run, on April 23 in a 5–4 victory over the Minnesota Twins. On May 29, he pinch-hit in the sixth inning, drew a walk, scored the tying run, then had a two-RBI single against Ted Abernathy in the next inning to help the Senators beat the Cleveland Indians 8–4. August 4, he hit a bases-loaded two-RBI single against Sonny Siebert, putting the Senators ahead to stay in a 4–2 victory over Cleveland. He played 143 games (506 at bats) for the Senators, batting .267 with 56 runs scored, 135 hits, 17 doubles, one home run, and 34 RBI.

On April 14, 1965, Blasingame had a two-RBI triple against Dick Radatz that put the Senators ahead to stay in a 6–4 victory over the Boston Red Sox. Three days later, he had three hits and drove in the Senators' only run in a 2–1 loss to the Chicago White Sox. His two-run single against Pete Mikkelsen on July 18 helped the Senators win a 3–0 victory over the Yankees. From August 22 through September 3, the Senators opted to play Ken Hamlin at second base instead of Blasingame. Blasingame only played 129 games (403 at bats) for the Senators in 1965, batting .223 with 90 hits, 47 runs scored, eight doubles, eight triples, one home run, and 18 RBI, stealing five bases.

In 1966 Blasingame began platooning with Hamlin at second base. The left-handed hitting Blasingame would start games against right-handed pitchers, while the right-handed hitting Hamlin would start against left-handers. Blasingame's only home run of the year came against Dave Wickersham, a solo shot in a 4–3 loss to the Detroit Tigers on June 13. In the first game of a doubleheader against Boston on July 4, he struck out a season-high three times but had two RBI in Washington's 6–4 win over the Red Sox. He batted .218 with 43 hits, 18 runs scored, 11 RBI, and nine doubles in 68 games (200 at bats) through the end of July. On August 2, the Kansas City Athletics purchased his contract.

Blasingame was mainly used as a pinch-hitter with Kansas City, only starting three games. He played 12 games for the Athletics, getting three hits in 19 at bats. Following the September call-ups, the Athletics released him on September 7. In 68 games his final year, Blasingame batted .210. He finished his time in the major leagues as a .258 career hitter with 1,366 hits, 178 doubles, 62 triples, 21 home runs, and 308 RBI in 1,444 games (219 at bats), stealing 105 bases.

== The only hit ==
Former players César Tovar and Eddie Milner each collected their team's only hit in a single game five separate times, an MLB record. Blasingame is the only other player to do so four or more times:

- July 13, 1962: Cubs pitcher Cal Koonce one-hit the Reds, giving up a single to Blasingame in a 1–0 Cubs victory.
- August 6, 1963: Stan Williams of the Yankees one-hit the Senators, giving up a double to Blasingame in a 1–0 Yankee win.
- August 20, 1963: Moe Drabowsky of the Athletics allowed one hit, a single by Blasingame, in the first game of a doubleheader as the A's won 9–0.
- September 25, 1965: Mudcat Grant of the Twins one-hit the Senators in the first game of a doubleheader to win, 5–0. Blasingame's double in the third inning was the only hit for Washington.

== Playing style ==
Blasingame was a speedy contact hitter, usually the leadoff man for his team. He never hit more than eight home runs in a season but had a .350 on-base percentage in his years with the Cardinals. He also had a reputation for being one of the game's best bunters and spray hitters. In an era where stolen bases were not common, Blasingame finished in the Top 10 in the NL in steals four times despite never stealing more than 21 in a season. His nickname, "Blazer", was a result of his flashy style of play and his swiftness at running the bases. His defense was highly regarded in his days with the Cardinals; retroactively he led the NL in fielding wins (a modern metric that attempts to predict how many more wins a team would have because of the fielding of one of its players) each year from 1956 through 1959. In 1958, Sports Illustrated wrote that Blasingame helped give St. Louis "the tightest defensive play in the league." Later in his career, his defensive abilities apparently declined; Sports Illustrated noted he had trouble making the double play by 1963. At the end of his final season, Blasingame had grounded into fewer double plays per times at bat than any other major leaguer. Only Don Buford has since had a lower rate.

== Player and manager in Japan ==
Opting to continue his playing career in Japan, Blasingame joined the Nankai Hawks in 1967. The Japanese referred to him by his nickname, "Blazer", because "Blasingame" was tough to pronounce and Blazer fit better in box scores. "It sounds snappy and even seems to evoke a spiritually stirring acoustic effect," said a publicity agent for the Hawks. "We ran over obstacle courses for a week and swung hammers and axes and ran up the side of a mountain,” Blasingame described spring training with Nankai. Playing second base for Nankai, he batted .268 with 61 runs scored, 128 hits, 18 doubles, six triples, five home runs, and 28 RBI, stealing five bases but getting caught nine times in 128 games (478 at bats). Next season, he played 134 games (513 at bats) with Nankai, batting .275 with 64 runs, 141 hits, 13 doubles, seven triples, four home runs, and 39 RBI, stealing three bases and getting caught five times. His final season with Nankai, he batted .279 with 46 runs scored, 102 hits, 10 doubles, one triple, six home runs, and 19 RBI in 104 games (365 at bats). Blasingame was surprised to find that the Japanese would actually shove umpires during games (without getting ejected), and he noted they were a lot more casual than Americans in the dugout, often eating food with chopsticks during the games.

After he finished his career as a player, Blasingame was a coach for Nankai for the next eight seasons. In 1978, he was a coach for the Hiroshima Toyo Carp. Then, he became manager of the Hanshin Tigers in 1979. After he took over, Hanshin traded fan-favorite Koichi Tabuchi to the Seibu Lions for Akinobu Mayumi, Masashi Takenouchi, and Yoshiharu Wakana. Hanshin finished fourth in the Central Division, also losing their number one draft pick Suguru Egawa in a trade to the Yomiuri Giants, whom Egawa preferred to play for. However, the trade brought Hanshin Shigeru Kobayashi, who won 22 games that season. There was a rift between Blasingame and Hanshin's front office when Blasingame signed American Dave Hilton to play second base. Hilton slumped in his time with Hanshin, and the front office asked Blasingame to call up a prospect to replace him at the position while also supposedly negotiating to sign Bruce Boisclair to replace him on the roster. Blasingame resigned, citing violated promises by the management to let him make decisions about players on the roster. He returned to the Nankai Hawks, this time as manager, in 1981. Blasingame tabbed Barney Schultz, a former knuckleball pitcher, as his pitching coach, and brought in Japanese American Wally Yonamine as a coach and interpreter. The team struggled with a lack of talent, and Blasingame was let go during the 1982 season.

Altogether, Blasingame spent 15 years in Japan. His managerial record was 180–208–28 (Japanese baseball allows for ties).

== Post-career ==
After his time in Japan, Blasingame served as the field coordinator for player development for the Phillies until 1998. He returned to Japan in 1984 and 1991 for old-timer's games. When he retired, he moved to the Scottsdale, Arizona area.

== Personal life ==
In 1960, Blasingame married Sara Cooper, a flight attendant for Ozark Air Lines who in 1957 was Miss Missouri. She won the Talent portion dancing the Charleston, and was a finalist (top 10) in the Miss America Pageant. Sara was the daughter of Walker Cooper, a teammate of Blasingame's on the Cardinals in 1956 and 1957. Cooper said of the marriage, "You know you are getting too old when your daughter marries one of your teammates." Blasingame and his wife had five children: Kent, Brett, Gregg, Dawn, and Cindy. Kent played minor league baseball for three seasons, including two seasons in the Phillies' organization. Gregg was a professional indoor soccer player with the Louisville Thunder of the American Indoor Soccer Association (AISA) from 1984 to 1985, the Tacoma Stars of the Major Indoor Soccer League (MISL) from 1985 to 1989, and the Atlanta Attack of the AISA in 1989–1991 (the league changed its name to National Professional Soccer League in Gregg's final season). While Don was in Japan, the family divided the year living there and in the United States. All their children became fluent in Japanese, which helped Kent out later on when he was a scout in Asia for the Colorado Rockies.

Blasingame died at age 73 on April 13, 2005, in Fountain Hills, Arizona, of an unexpected heart attack after talking to his brother on the phone earlier in the day. He is interred at Paradise Memorial Gardens in Scottsdale.

== Legacy ==
The Corinth SportsPlex's youth baseball league was named after Blasingame in the 1970s, and in 1980, he was inducted into the Mississippi Sports Hall of Fame. A street in Corinth was named Blasingame Street in his honor.
