= Gernert =

Gernert is a surname of German origin. Notable people with the surname include:

- Dick Gernert (1928–2017), American baseball player
