= Bob Schmidt (baseball) =

American baseball player (1933–2015)

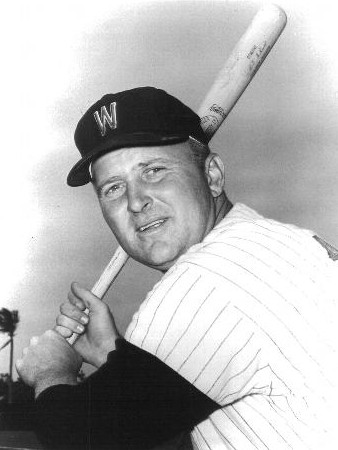
- Schmidt in 1962
- Catcher
- Born: April 22, 1933; St. Louis, Missouri, U.S.
- Died: May 2, 2015 (aged 82); DeBary, Florida, U.S.
- Batted: Right Threw: Right

MLB debut
- April 16, 1958, for the San Francisco Giants

Last MLB appearance
- June 8, 1965, for the New York Yankees

MLB statistics
- Batting average: .243
- Home runs: 39
- Runs batted in: 150
- Stats at Baseball Reference

Teams
- San Francisco Giants (1958–1961); Cincinnati Reds (1961); Washington Senators (1962–1963); New York Yankees (1965)

Career highlights and awards
- All-Star (1958)

Robert Benjamin Schmidt (April 22, 1933 – May 2, 2015) was an American professional baseball player, a catcher in Major League Baseball for seven seasons (1958–63; 1965) for the San Francisco Giants, Cincinnati Reds, Washington Senators and New York Yankees. He threw and batted right-handed and was listed as 6 feet 2 inches (1.88 m) tall and 205 pounds (93 kg).

== Major League career ==
Born in St. Louis, Missouri, Schmidt signed with the New York Giants in 1951, and rose methodically through their minor league system. He missed the 1953 and 1954 seasons due to military service, but when he returned to baseball he was selected all-star catcher in successive years in the Double-A Texas League (1956) and the Triple-A American Association (1957). Concurrently the Giants' catchers of the 1950s, Wes Westrum, Ray Katt and Valmy Thomas, were aging or proving ineffective, and the franchise itself transferred to San Francisco.

As a rookie with the 1958 San Francisco Giants, Schmidt was selected to be on the National League team in the 1958 All-Star Game. On August 31, 1958, Schmidt hit a home run and had six runs batted in against future Baseball Hall of Fame member, Sandy Koufax, of the Los Angeles Dodgers, including a first-inning grand slam. But by 1959, Schmidt was sharing the Giants' catching job with left-handed-hitting Hobie Landrith.

In 1961, he was traded with Don Blasingame and Sherman Jones to the Cincinnati Reds for catcher Ed Bailey. Schmidt appeared in 27 games as a reserve to regular catcher Jerry Zimmerman during the Reds' pennant-winning season of 1961, but he batted only .129, spent part of the year at Triple-A, and was not included on the post-season roster when the Reds lost to the 1961 Yankees in the World Series. In 1962 he was traded along with Dave Stenhouse to the Washington Senators for Marty Keough and Johnny Klippstein. Schmidt ended his career with the New York Yankees in 1965.

== Career statistics ==
In a seven-year major league career, Schmidt played in 454 games, accumulating 317 hits in 1,305 at bats for a .243 career batting average along with 39 home runs and 150 runs batted in. Schmidt led the American League in fielding percentage in 1962 while playing for the Senators. He had a career fielding percentage of .988. He holds the Major League record for most putouts in an extra inning game with 22, set on June 22, 1958.
