= Kojiro Ikegaya =

Japanese baseball player (1945–2026)

- Pitcher / Coach
- Born: 28 June 1952; Shizuoka, Shizuoka Prefecture, Japan
- Died: 29 October 2026 (aged 74)
- Batted: Right Threw: Right

NPB debut
- June 29, 1974, for the Hiroshima Toyo Carp

Last NPB appearance
- October 24, 1985, for the Hiroshima Toyo Carp

NPB statistics
- Win–loss record: 103–84
- Earned run average: 4.13
- Strikeouts: 1,056
- Saves: 10
- Stats at Baseball Reference

Teams
- As player: Hiroshima Toyo Carp (1974–1985); As coach: Hiroshima Toyo Carp (1989–1992); Yomiuri Giants (1998–2001, 2004)

Career highlights and awards
- 1× Central League Best Nine Award (1976); 1× Eiji Sawamura Award (1976); 1× Central League wins champion (1976); 2× Central League strikeout champion (1976, 1977); 2× NPB All-Star (1975–1976)
- Last updated on: 24 October 2020

Kojiro Ikegaya (池谷 公二郎, Ikegaya Kojiro; 28 June 1952 – 29 October 2026) was a Japanese Nippon Professional Baseball pitcher.

Ikegaya died on 29 October 2026, at the age of 74.
