= 1958 Major League Baseball All-Star Game =

1958 American baseball competition

	1	2	3	4	5	6	7	8	9	R	H	E
National League	2	1	0	0	0	0	0	0	0	3	4	2
American League	1	1	0	0	1	1	0	0	X	4	9	2
- Date: July 8, 1958
- Venue: Memorial Stadium
- City: Baltimore, Maryland
- Managers: Fred Haney (MIL); Casey Stengel (NYY)
- Attendance: 48,829
- Ceremonial first pitch: Vice President Richard Nixon
- Television: NBC
- TV announcers: Mel Allen and Al Helfer
- Radio: NBC
- Radio announcers: Bob Neal and Ernie Harwell

The 1958 Major League Baseball All-Star Game was the 25th playing of the midsummer classic between the all-stars of the American League (AL) and National League (NL), the two leagues comprising Major League Baseball. The game was held on July 8, 1958, at Memorial Stadium in Baltimore, Maryland, the home of the Baltimore Orioles of the American League.

This was the first Major League Baseball All-Star Game without an extra base hit.

For this silver jubilee game, the ceremonial first pitch was thrown by U.S. Vice President Richard Nixon, who became President 10 years later. The attendance was 48,829. The game was broadcast on the NBC television and radio networks.

The first hit of the game was by legendary center fielder Willie Mays. The last scoring came in the sixth inning when the American League team took the lead after an error by third baseman Frank Thomas led to a single by Gil McDougald. Early Wynn was the winning pitcher as the American League scored a 4-3 victory.

Several players were named to the team but did not get into the game. These included Billy Pierce, Tony Kubek, Harvey Kuenn, Sherm Lollar, Rocky Bridges, Ryne Duren, Whitey Ford, and Elston Howard for the American League. For the National League team, Johnny Antonelli, Richie Ashburn, George Crowe, Eddie Mathews, Don McMahon, Walt Moryn, Johnny Podres, Bob Purkey, and Bob Schmidt were on the roster but did not play.

The next All-Star Game to be played in Baltimore was in 1993; that edition was aired on both CBS TV and radio, and played in Oriole Park at Camden Yards, with a special commemoration of this game's 35th anniversary.

== Opening lineups ==
American League			National League
Player	Team	Pos	Player	Team	Pos
Nellie Fox	Chicago White Sox	2B	Willie Mays	San Francisco Giants	CF
Mickey Mantle	New York Yankees	CF	Bob Skinner	Pittsburgh Pirates	LF
Jackie Jensen	Boston Red Sox	RF	Stan Musial	St. Louis Cardinals	1B
Bob Cerv	Kansas City Athletics	LF	Henry Aaron	Milwaukee Braves	RF
Bill Skowron	New York Yankees	1B	Ernie Banks	Chicago Cubs	SS
Frank Malzone	Boston Red Sox	3B	Frank Thomas	Pittsburgh Pirates	3B
Gus Triandos	Baltimore Orioles	C	Bill Mazeroski	Pittsburgh Pirates	2B
Luis Aparicio	Chicago White Sox	SS	Del Crandall	Milwaukee Braves	C
Bob Turley	New York Yankees	P	Warren Spahn	Milwaukee Braves	P

== Umpires ==
Position	Umpire
Home Plate	Eddie Rommel (AL)
First Base	Tom Gorman (NL)
Second Base	Bill McKinley (AL)
Third Base	Jocko Conlan (NL)
Left Field	Frank Umont (AL)
Right Field	Frank Secory (NL)

== Line score ==
Tuesday, July 8, 1958 1:00 pm (ET) at Memorial Stadium in Baltimore, Maryland
Team	1	2	3	4	5	6	7	8	9	R	H	E
National League	2	1	0	0	0	0	0	0	0	3	4	2
American League	1	1	0	0	1	1	0	0	X	4	9	2
WP: Early Wynn (1–0) LP: Bob Friend (0–1) Sv: Billy O'Dell (1)
