= Suguru Egawa =

Japanese baseball player and analyst (born 1955)

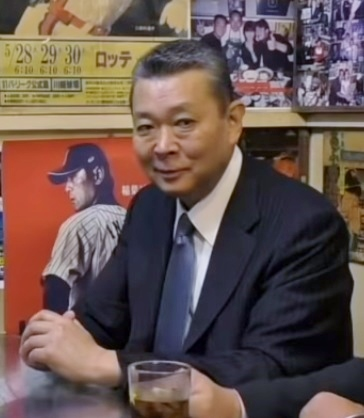
- Pitcher
- Born: May 25, 1955 (age 70); Iwaki, Fukushima, Japan
- Batted: Right Threw: Right

NPB debut
- June 2, 1979, for the Yomiuri Giants

Last appearance
- July 12, 1987, for the Yomiuri Giants

NPB statistics
- Win–loss: 135–72
- ERA: 3.02
- Strikeouts: 1366
- Stats at Baseball Reference

Teams
- Yomiuri Giants (1979–1987)

Career highlights and awards
- Japanese Triple Crown (1981); Central League MVP (1981); 2x Best Nine Award (1980, 1981); Japan Series champion (1981)

Suguru Egawa (江川 卓, Egawa Suguru; born May 25, 1955 in Iwaki, Fukushima Prefecture) is a Japanese former pitcher and current baseball analyst. Despite being one of the best pitchers of his generation, Egawa's perceived arrogance and non-conformist ways earned him the media nicknames "Dirty Egawa," "The Giant Devil," and "The Enemy of the People." Most famously, Egawa expressed interest in playing in the Central League over the Pacific League, even when being drafted in 1977 and 1978. As a technical free agent in 1978, he signed with the Yomiuri Giants, which caused a headache for the league that resulted in him eventually being traded to the Yomiuri Giants. He played with the Giants for eight years before retiring due to arm injuries.

== High school career ==
Egawa entered Sakushin Gakuin High School. In his high school career, he recorded two perfect games, nine no-hitters, 20 shutouts, and 30 complete games in 44 games pitched. He closed out his high school career with an earned run average of 0.41, which was significantly lower than Daisuke Matsuzaka (1.12) and Masahiro Tanaka (1.31). In the spring of 1973, he set a still-standing record of 60 strikeouts in National High School Baseball Invitational Tournament. He was nicknamed "The Monster", a nickname that Matsuzaka (and to a lesser extent Rōki Sasaki) later received as well. However, he was different from Matsuzaka in not having strong teammates. His team had never won the championship at the Koshien Stadium.

== College career ==
At Hosei University, Egawa was also a dominant pitcher, setting a number of school records.

== Professional career ==
Egawa was drafted by the Crown Lighter Lions in 1977, but turned down the team's offer because he wanted only to play for the Yomiuri Giants, and that "Kyushu was too far away, and I don't like flying", as he had developed acrophobia as a kid nearly falling off a cliff. Instead, he went to Los Angeles, attended University of Southern California, and worked with USC baseball pitching coach Rod Dedeaux, while also learning English with future NPB player Chris Smith.

After the Fukuoka Baseball Corporation sold the Lions to Seibu, then moved them to Tokorozawa, representatives began contacting Egawa to try and get him to sign. While Tokorozawa was in Kanto, because the Lions were a Pacific League team (as Egawa only wanted to play in Kanto and in the Central League), he denied the contract. However, Seibu representatives were so persistent, Egawa's handler tried to issue a restraining order against them to avoid them contacting him. This was later thrown out by a judge in Los Angeles court, as Seibu had a legitimate reason to contact Egawa, which ended up having one big consequence for Seibu. As it turned out, his handler was a board member of Mitsubishi of America, so because of that, Seibu had to cut ties with Mitsubishi as a whole, which meant removing Mitsubishi products from Seibu's Sogo stores, and selling off all buses made by Mitsubishi in their bus line. Relations between both companies was only restored in the 2000s after Yoshiaki Tsutsumi stepped down after he was convicted for insider trading and arrested.

12 months later, he signed a contract with the Giants — despite the fact that the Hanshin Tigers had drafted him number one in the 1978 draft. On November 21, 1978, Egawa was traded to the Giants. Because there was no reverse-draft, this act was regarded as unfair by the other Japanese professional baseball teams, and they protested. Nonetheless, Egawa officially joined the Giants before the 1979 season. The trade, however, brought Hanshin pitcher Shigeru Kobayashi, who won 22 games that season. Egawa was suspended until June from playing baseball.

Egawa notched over 10 wins as a pitcher each year from 1980 until his retirement. In 1981, his record of 20–6, with a 2.28 earned run average and 221 strikeouts earned him the Japanese Triple Crown and the Central League MVP.

He recorded eight consecutive strikeouts in the 1984 All-Star game, just missing Yutaka Enatsu's record of nine straight strikeouts.

In 1985, American expatriate player Randy Bass of the Hanshin Tigers was poised to break Sadaharu Oh's single-season record of 55 home runs. The Yomiuri Giants pitchers — whose manager was Sadaharu Oh — were said by pitching coach to have been given instructions to intentionally walk Bass in every at-bat. However, Egawa ignored the indication in the first game of the two last Giants' games against Hanshin Tigers — Bass went 1 for 2 against Egawa, with a single and an unintentional walk. After Egawa left the mound, Bass was issued five walks in six at-bats.

On June 26, 1986, Egawa gave up a home run to Bass, which was Bass' seventh consecutive game with a home run. Sadaharu Oh's record is also seven consecutive games. Egawa was admired for his fair play, even though it sometimes went against the wishes of his team.

Egawa retired in 1987 at the still young age of 32, claiming arm issues. Like Hiromitsu Ochiai, known for his Oreryu (オレ流) attitude ("to do with only my style"), Egawa was considered part of a new generation of Japanese baseball players who rejected the traditional values of "obligation, self-sacrifice, and deference to their superiors."

== Retirement ==
Since he retired in 1987, he has been working as a baseball analyst. In the Japanese anime film Whisper of the Heart, he played a role as a baseball analyst. Since 2022, he has uploaded videos on YouTube analyzing baseball.
