= Don McMahon =

American baseball player (1930–1987)

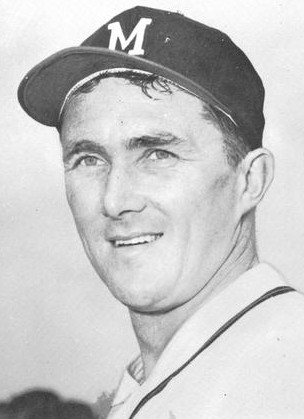
- McMahon in 1958
- Pitcher
- Born: January 4, 1930; Brooklyn, New York, U.S.
- Died: July 22, 1987 (aged 57); Los Angeles, California, U.S.
- Batted: Right Threw: Right

MLB debut
- June 30, 1957, for the Milwaukee Braves

Last MLB appearance
- June 29, 1974, for the San Francisco Giants

MLB statistics
- Win–loss record: 90–68
- Earned run average: 2.96
- Strikeouts: 1,003
- Saves: 152
- Stats at Baseball Reference

Teams
- Milwaukee Braves (1957–1962); Houston Colt .45's (1962–1963); Cleveland Indians (1964–1966); Boston Red Sox (1966–1967); Chicago White Sox (1967–1968); Detroit Tigers (1968–1969); San Francisco Giants (1969–1974)

Career highlights and awards
- All-Star (1958); 2× World Series champion (1957, 1968)

Donald John McMahon (January 4, 1930 – July 22, 1987) was an American right-handed relief pitcher in Major League Baseball (MLB). Born in Brooklyn, New York, he was signed by the Boston Braves before the 1950 season. He played for the Milwaukee Braves (1957–1962), Houston Colt .45s (1962–1963), Cleveland Indians (1964–1966), Boston Red Sox (1966–1967), Chicago White Sox (1967–1968), Detroit Tigers (1968–1969), and San Francisco Giants (1969–1974).

McMahon was used almost exclusively in relief during his 18-year major league career. He appeared in 874 games, just two as a starter, and was one of the busiest and most dependable relievers of his era. He never was on the disabled list, and in the fifteen full seasons that he played (1958–1972), he averaged about 54 games and 81 innings pitched per year.

== Early life ==
McMahon was born on January 4, 1930, in Brooklyn, New York. He was a baseball star at Erasmus Hall High School, where he was known for his hitting ability and power, speed, and defensive skill in the outfield (which featured his strong throwing arm), as well as playing third base. One of his Erasmus Hall classmates was future owner of the Oakland/Los Angeles Raiders Al Davis, whom McMahon beat out for starting right fielder on Erasmus Hall's baseball team. As a youth, he also played sandlot baseball for the Flatbush Robins, where his batting average was always in excess of .350.

== Career ==
McMahon was signed by the Boston Braves as an amateur free agent in 1950. He reached the big leagues at the advanced age of 27 after playing minor league ball for about 5 1/2 years and spending two years in the military (May 30, 1951 – May 17, 1953). He appeared in his final game on June 29, 1974, nearly 17 years after his major league debut.

=== Minor leagues ===
As a 20-year old in 1950, McMahon was assigned as a pitcher to the Class-D Owensboro Oilers. He had a won–loss record of 20–9, with a 2.72 earned run average (ERA), pitching 218 innings (the most he ever pitched in a season) in 33 games. After returning from military service, he had a 6–5 record and 4.50 ERA with the Class-B Evansville Braves in 1953; starting 12 of the 26 games in which he appeared. He was promoted to the Braves' Double-A affiliate in 1954, where manager Whitlow Wyatt converted him into a full-time relief pitcher.

McMahon improved over the prior season, now pitching almost exclusively in relief, but when promoted to the Triple-A Toledo Sox in 1955, he had a poor year, with a 2–13 record and 5.01 ERA, starting 17 of the 42 games in which he appeared. He split the 1956 season between Double-A ball, where his record was 4–2 with a 2.00 ERA, pitching 13 of 14 games in relief; and the Triple-A Wichita Braves, where he was 4–4, with a 4.35 ERA; starting only six out of his 40 games.

McMahon was on the Braves 1957 spring training roster, but started the season with Wichita. He pitched almost exclusively in relief, and improved to 6–2 with a 2.92 ERA and 65 strikeouts in 71 innings pitched.

=== Major leagues ===
==== Milwaukee Braves ====
McMahon was called up to the Milwaukee Braves in June of 1957, during the team's run to the National League championship and eventual World Series success. McMahon believed he was the first pitcher to come up to the major leagues strictly as a relief pitcher. McMahon became the Braves relief pitching ace. He appeared in 32 regular season games for the Braves, all in relief. He had a 1.54 ERA, eight saves (tied for 7th in the National League), 46 strikeouts in 46.2 innings, and a 2–3 record. In the 1957 World Series, McMahon appeared in three games, pitching five innings, striking out five New York Yankees, and not allowing a run.

In McMahon's first full major league season (1958), the Braves won the NL championship again, but this time lost to the Yankees in the World Series, four games to three. McMahon pitched in 38 games, all in relief. He had a 7–2 regular season record, with eight saves and a 3.68 ERA in 58.2 innings pitched. McMahon again pitched in three World Series games, but had a 5.40 ERA in 3.1 innings pitched. He was selected to play in the 1958 All-Star game, the only time he was ever chosen as an All-Star.

In 1959, McMahon pitched 60 games in relief for the second-place Braves, with a 5–3 record, 15 saves (tied for second in the major leagues), and a 2.57 ERA in 80.2 innings pitched (finishing more games (49) than any other pitcher in all of major league baseball). In 1960, his ERA rose by over 3 runs (5.94) and his record was 3–6. He regained form in 1961, appearing in 53 games with a 6–4 record, eight saves, and 2.84 ERA. In early May of 1962, however, he had pitched in only two games for the Braves when they sold McMahon's contract rights to the Houston Colt 45s.

==== Colt 45s ====
McMahon came to the Colt 45s in their first year of existence, after the NL expansion in 1962. He pitched in 51 games for the Colt 45s, who finished their first season 64–96–2; but McMahon had a 5–5 record with eight saves and a sterling 1.53 ERA to go along with 69 strikeouts in 76.2 innings pitched. As part of the new team's efforts to gain fans, the Brooklyn-born McMahon and teammate Hal Woodeshick competed in a cow-milking contest against the Cincinnati Reds. His ERA rose to 4.05 in 1963, with a 1–5 record. At the end of that season, his rights were sold to the Cleveland Indians of the American League (AL).

==== Cleveland, Boston Red Sox, Chicago White Sox ====
In 1964 with Cleveland, McMahon had a career high in appearances (70). His 16 saves tied for sixth best in the AL. He had a 6–4 record, with a 2.41 ERA and 92 strikeouts in 101 innings pitched. His ERA rose in 1965 to 3.28, with a 3–3 record and 11 saves. On June 2, 1966, he and Lee Stange were traded to the Boston Red Sox for fellow relief pitcher Dick "the Monster" Radatz.

As with Milwaukee, Houston, and Cleveland, McMahon pitched very well in his first year with the Red Sox. He appeared in 49 games in relief, with an 8–7 record, nine saves and a 2.65 ERA; playing on a ninth-place team that had a 72–90 record. One year to the day after being traded to the Red Sox, the team traded him to the Chicago White Sox for versatile infielder Jerry Adair on June 2, 1967. Adair would go on to play an important role in the Red Sox winning the AL championship in 1967. McMahon excelled for the White Sox. He appeared in 52 games as a relief pitcher, with a 1.67 ERA, 5–0 record, three saves, and 74 strikeouts in 91.2 innings pitched. In 1968, McMahon had appeared in 25 games for the White Sox, with a 1.96 ERA, when he was traded to the Detroit Tigers for Dennis Ribant on July 26.

==== Detroit Tigers and San Francisco Giants ====
Consistent with his history on every other major league team, McMahon was excellent in his first year with the Tigers. He had a 2.02 ERA with a 3–1 record in 20 relief appearances for the Tigers in 1968, as their bullpen ace. The Tigers traded the 26-year old Ribant for the 38-year old McMahon because he had the experience to stand the heat of a pennant race. The Tigers won the AL championship, and then defeated the St. Louis Cardinals four games to three in the 1968 World Series. McMahon pitched in two World Series games, giving up three runs in two innings, including a three-run home run to future Hall of Famer Orlando Cepeda.

On August 8, 1969, McMahon had a 3.89 ERA with a 3–5 record and 11 saves, when the Tigers traded him to the San Francisco Giants for a player to be named later (Cesar Gutierrez). The Giants would be the last of the seven teams he played for in the major leagues. After pitching in 13 games for the 1969 Giants, the 40-year old McMahon pitched in 61 games in 1970, with a career-high 19 saves (sixth best in the NL). He also had a 9–5 record and 2.96 ERA, with 74 strikeouts in 94.1 innings pitched.

In 1971, the Giants won the NL Western Division, but lost to the Pittsburgh Pirates in the 1971 National League Championship Series (NLCS). McMahon appeared in 61 regular season games again for the Giants, with a 10–6 record and four saves, but a 4.06 ERA. He appeared in two NLCS games, pitching three innings without giving up a hit, base on balls or a run.

In 1972, he appeared in 44 games for the Giants, with a 3.71 ERA, and was released by the Giants, effectively forcing his retirement. However, the Giants re-signed McMahon in late-June 1973 because their bullpen pitching was weak. At age 43, in his first game back, he got the six Atlanta Braves he faced out in succession (including Hank Aaron). That year, McMahon had 22 relief appearances with a 4–0 record, six saves, and 1.48 ERA. He was again released at the end of the season, and was re-signed in May of 1974. His major league career ended in July 1974, when after pitching only 11.2 innings, the Giants released McMahon for the final time. The signings and releases with the Giants were facilitated by the fact he was also the Giants pitching coach.

In his final game, at the age of 44 (by far the oldest player in Major League Baseball at that time), McMahon pitched two scoreless innings against the Los Angeles Dodgers (June 29, 1974). Unlike some other players who pitched into their 40s, such as his contemporary Hoyt Wilhelm, McMahon still relied on the fastball as his principal pitch.

=== Career ===
McMahon was a valuable part of two World Championship clubs—the 1957 Milwaukee Braves and the 1968 Detroit Tigers. Altogether, he pitched in three World Series and one National League Championship Series. He finished in the American League or National League top ten seven times for games pitched, seven times for saves, eight times for games finished, and once each for wild pitches, hit batsmen, and winning percentage.

Tommy John, McMahon's teammate on the Indians, described the pitcher as "a nail-tough, confident-bordering-on-cocky, Brooklyn-born veteran."

He recorded his 1,000th strikeout at the age of 44 on May 27, 1974 on All-Star shortstop Don Kessinger of the Chicago Cubs. A little more than a month later, when McMahon retired, only Hoyt Wilhelm, Lindy McDaniel, and Cy Young had pitched in more games.

For his career he finished with a lifetime record of 90–68, 153 saves, 506 games finished, and an earned run average of 2.96. As of the conclusion of the 2006 season, McMahon ranked 17th all-time for fewest hits allowed per 9 innings pitched (7.24). Through 2024, he ranks 21st all time in hits allowed per nine innings.

McMahon held Hall of Famers Hank Aaron, Ernie Banks, Johnny Bench, Harmon Killebrew, Bill Mazeroski, Joe Morgan, Stan Musial, Brooks Robinson, Frank Robinson, and Willie Stargell to a .149 collective batting average (28-for-188).

=== Coaching ===
McMahon served as the Giants pitching coach from 1972 to 1975, and also from 1980 to 1982. He was activated by San Francisco for parts of the 1972, 1973, and 1974 seasons when the Giants needed his experienced and effective arm to help out in the bullpen. (Relievers Elías Sosa and Randy Moffitt - brother of tennis star Billie Jean King - were shouldering most of the load, and were not getting enough help from the others.) He also was the pitching coach of the Minnesota Twins from 1976 to 1977 and of the Cleveland Indians from 1983 to 1985. In 1986, after a recommendation from friend and fellow high school classmate Al Davis to Dodgers manager Tommy Lasorda, McMahon was hired as a scout for the LA Dodgers.

== Personal life ==
During his playing career, McMahon served as a football scout for his old high school teammate Al Davis and the Oakland Raiders.

== Death ==
In 1987, he was working as an instructional coach and scout with the Los Angeles Dodgers and often pitched batting practice before many home games. On July 22, he was pitching batting practice when he suffered a heart attack, having undergone heart bypass surgery about three and a half years prior. McMahon died within hours. He was buried at the Good Shepherd Cemetery in Huntington Beach, California, with a baseball in his hand. Don had several children with his wife Darlene, including his son Jack and Mike McMahon. At the time of Mr. McMahon's death the family lived in Garden Grove, California.

== See also ==
- List of Major League Baseball annual saves leaders

Preceded by Larry Jansen; Larry Shepard	San Francisco Giants pitching coach 1972–1975; 1980–1982	Succeeded by Buck Rodgers; Herm Starrette
Preceded by Lee Stange	Minnesota Twins pitching coach 1976–1977	Succeeded by Camilo Pascual
Preceded by Chuck Estrada	Cleveland Indians pitching coach 1983–1985	Succeeded by Jack Aker
