= Gene Freese =

American baseball player (1934–2013)

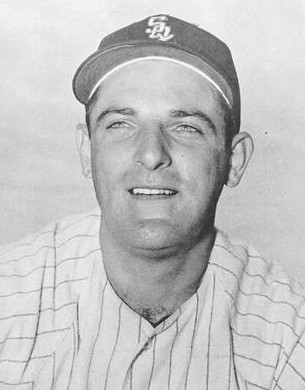
- Third baseman
- Born: January 8, 1934; Wheeling, West Virginia, U.S.
- Died: June 18, 2013 (aged 79); Metairie, Louisiana, U.S.
- Batted: Right Threw: Right

MLB debut
- April 13, 1955, for the Pittsburgh Pirates

Last MLB appearance
- September 3, 1966, for the Houston Astros

MLB statistics
- Batting average: .254
- Home runs: 115
- Runs batted in: 432
- Stats at Baseball Reference

Teams
- Pittsburgh Pirates (1955–1958); St. Louis Cardinals (1958); Philadelphia Phillies (1959); Chicago White Sox (1960); Cincinnati Reds (1961–1963); Pittsburgh Pirates (1964–1965); Chicago White Sox (1965–1966); Houston Astros (1966)

Eugene Lewis Freese (January 8, 1934 – June 18, 2013) was an American professional baseball third baseman, who was widely noted as a journeyman. Freese played in Major League Baseball for the Pittsburgh Pirates (twice), St. Louis Cardinals, Philadelphia Phillies, Chicago White Sox (twice), Cincinnati Reds, and Houston Astros, for 12 seasons (1955–1966).

Freese's career batting average stands at .254, in 1,115 games played, with 115 home runs and 432 runs batted in (RBI). During his playing days, he was listed as 5 feet 11 inches (1.80 m) tall, weighing 175 pounds (79 kg); Freese batted and threw right-handed. His career was derailed at its peak, when he suffered a broken ankle before the 1962 season.

His teammates nicknamed him "Augie" as a Pirate rookie, in 1955, after umpire Augie Donatelli, who was calling balls and strikes in Freese's first big league game.

During his Major League career, Freese was traded or had his contract rights sold a total of seven times.

== Early life ==
Freese was born on January 8, 1934, in Wheeling, West Virginia. He attended Wheeling High School, graduating in 1951. His over 7½-year older brother George Freese also attended Wheeling High, and the two later became teammates on the Pittsburgh Pirates in 1955.

Freese was a three-sport athlete at West Liberty State College, and played tailback on the football team.

== Baseball career ==
He signed as an amateur free agent with the Pirates in March 1953. Between Major League Baseball (MLB) and Minor League Baseball (MiLB), Freese played 17 seasons in professional baseball.

=== Pittsburgh Pirates ===
In 1953, the Pirates assigned Freese to the Brunswick Pirates of the Class D Georgia-Florida League. Freese split his time defensively between second base and shortstop. He had a .309 batting average, with nine home runs, 89 runs batted in (RBI), 94 runs scored, and an .833 OPS (on-base plus slugging). In 1954, Freese was promoted to the Double-A New Orleans Pelicans of the Southern Association, under manager Danny Murtaugh. He split time between second base (.969 fielding percentage) and third base (.931 fielding percentage) defensively, and hit .332, with 16 home runs, 98 RBIs, 98 runs and an .872 OPS.

In 1955, he was called up to the Pirates, and played the full season for Pittsburgh, playing in 134 games. Defensively, he again split time between second base (.965 fielding percentage) and third base (.943 fielding percentage). Freese hit .257 in 179 at bats, with three home runs and 22 RBIs. During the 1955 season, Freese and his brother George were both members of the Pittsburgh Pirates, in what was both of their rookie seasons. On June 10, 1955, over 1,000 Wheeling residents, including their parents, attended a game at Forbes Field in Pittsburgh to honor the brothers. The Pittsburgh chapter of the Baseball Writers Association selected Freese to receive the John L. Hernon Award as the Pirates' Rookie of the Year, over future Hall of Fame outfielder Roberto Clemente.

One of the most memorable plays of his career came on May 28, 1955. The Pirates and Philadelphia Phillies were tied 4–4, with Freese on first base and teammate Tom Saffell on third base in the ninth inning. Pirates batter Román Mejías hit a ball into the outfield that should have resulted in a base hit and driven in Saffell with the winning run. Instead of going to second base, however, Freese turned around to shake Mejías hand in congratulations. Phillies shortstop Roy Smalley recognized Freese failed to reach second base, and called for centerfielder Richie Ashburn to throw him the ball. Smalley got the ball and stepped on second base, resulting in a force out of Freese and negating the run. The Phillies then went on to win the game.

The play was reminiscent of the similar, infamous, baserunning error by New York Giant Fred Merkle in 1908 that cost the Giants the National League pennant; long known as "Fred Merkle's boner". Newspaper headlines compared the two events the next day, with such headlines as "Pirate Rookie Pulls a Merkle Boner", "Boner Recalls 1908", and "Gene Freese's Mistake Like Costly Fred Merkle's 'Boner'". Unlike Merkle, who was plagued by repeated retellings of the event until his death, with even his New York Times obituary focusing on the 1908 incident nearly 50 years later, Freese was able to laugh about his faux pas, as it occurred for a bad team with no aspiration to a pennant.

Freese began the 1956 season with the Pirates, but was assigned to the Hollywood Stars of the Pacific Coast League in July, before rejoining the Pirates in mid-September. He hit .208 in 207 at bats, with three home runs and 14 RBIs for the Pirates in 1956. He hit .274 for the Stars, with 11 home runs and 36 RBIs in only 223 at bats.

Before joining the Stars, Freese was fined $50 by NL President Warren Giles in late May for "'inciting to riot'". He had been called out at second base by umpire Augie Donatelli, and started a heated argument with Donatelli, who ejected Freese from the game. As Freese walked off the field, some of the Pirates fans threw beer cans onto the field, and one patron was struck by a beer can. Ironically, Freese got the nickname "Augie" as the result of his Pirates teammates playing a practical joke on him and Donatelli, by telling the public address announcer that Freese's first name was Augie, rather than Gene. The nickname stayed with him through the remainder of his life.

In 1957, he played the full season with the Pirates, with the majority of his games at third base (74), while also playing ten games each in the outfield and at second base. He hit .283 in 346 at bats, with six home runs, 31 RBIs and 44 runs scored. He led all National League (NL) third basemen with 16 fielding errors, fourth most in all of Major League Baseball, and had a .924 fielding percentage at third base.

=== St. Louis Cardinals, Philadelphia Phillies and Chicago White Sox ===
Freese began the 1958 season with the Pirates, but on June 15 was traded with Johnny O'Brien to the St. Louis Cardinals for Dick "Ducky" Schofield and cash. Before the trade, Freese had been little used by the Pirates, but played in 62 games for the Cardinals that year, batting .257 in 191 at bats, with six home runs and 16 RBIs. After the season ended, the Cardinals traded Freese to the Philadelphia Phillies for Solly Hemus. In 1959, Freese's sole year in Philadelphia, he played 109 games at third base with a .916 fielding percentage, leading all National League third basemen with 22 errors, third worst in Major League Baseball. However, he hit .268, with 23 home runs, 70 RBIs, 60 runs scored and an .843 OPS.

After the 1959 season, the Phillies traded Freese to the American League's (AL) Chicago White Sox for Johnny Callison. In 1960 for the White Sox, he hit .273, with 17 home runs and 79 RBIs. He played 122 games at third base, and his fielding percentage improved to .946. He committed two less errors than in 1959, in 110 more chances.

=== Cincinnati Reds ===
After the 1960 season, the White Sox traded Freese to the Cincinnati Reds for pitchers Juan Pizzaro and Cal McLish. Freese was a member of the 1961 National League champion Reds, playing a prime role in the team's success. In 1961, he reached career highs in plate appearances (606), at bats (575), batting average (.277), runs scored (78), hits (159), home runs (26), RBIs (87) and games played (152 – 151 of which were at third base), as Cincinnati won its first pennant since 1940. His fielding percentage at third base improved to .950, the best of his career in seasons where he played more than 47 games at third base.

In the 1961 World Series, won by the New York Yankees in five games, Freese batted only .063 (1-for-16) and was the victim of one of two spectacular defensive plays by his third-base counterpart, Clete Boyer, in the Series opener; helping Whitey Ford defeat Jim O'Toole, 2–0.

In early March 1962, during the Reds spring training camp in Tampa, in an intrasquad game, Freese fractured his right ankle sliding into second base and had to be carted to an ambulance. He would only play in 18 games during the 1962 season. He did not play his first game that season until mid-August, and finished the season with only 42 at bats. Freese was never the same player after breaking his ankle. He played four more years in Major League Baseball, but would never play in more than 99 games in a season for the remainder of his career, never have more than 289 at bats in a season, and never match the batting numbers during his peak years (1959-61).

Going into the Reds' 1963 season, Freese was still experiencing the effects of his broken ankle from a year earlier. He began the season in Cincinnati, but after hitting just .154 in 17 games, in early May the Reds optioned him to the San Diego Padres of the Pacific Coast League. Freese was upset by the Reds' decision, and thought about not reporting to San Diego. However, he ultimately did join the Padres, batting .281 in 54 games, with 12 home runs and 34 RBIs. He returned to the Reds in mid-July, and by the end of the season raised his average to .244, with six home runs and 26 RBIs.

=== Return to the Pirates and White Sox, Houston Astros ===
After the 1963 season, the Reds sold Freese's contract rights to the Pittsburgh Pirates. He played in 99 games for the Pirates in 1964, starting 62 at third base. He hit .225, with nine home runs and 40 RBIs. He started the 1965 season with the Pirates. Freese played in 43 games, but less than half of those games in the field, and had only 80 at bats when his contract rights were sold to the Chicago White Sox on August 23, 1965. He only appeared in 17 games for the White Sox, with 32 at bats in 1965.

1966 was his last year in Major League Baseball. He began the 1966 season with the White Sox, playing in 48 games, hitting .208 in 106 at bats, with three home runs and 10 RBIs. He played in 34 games at third base, starting 24. On July 20, 1966, the White Sox traded Freese to the Houston Astros for Jim Mahoney and cash. He appeared in only 21 games, with a .091 average in 33 at bats. He played two more seasons of Triple-A minor league baseball before retiring altogether from professional baseball after the 1968 season.

During his 12-year Major League career, Freese had a .254 batting average, 877 hits, 161 doubles, 28 triples, 115 home runs, 432 RBIs, 429 runs scored and a .723 OPS. During his playing days, he was listed as 5 feet 11 inches (1.80 m) tall, weighing 175 pounds (79 kg); Freese batted and threw right-handed.

== Managerial career ==
In 1973, Freese managed the Double-A Shreveport Captains of the Texas League. He was also the team captain and occasionally played for the Captains. The team had a 70–68 record, and was second in the Texas League's Eastern Division. He also served as manager, along with Ken McBride, during the Captains' 1974 season.

== Honors ==
In 1988, Freese was inducted into the Greater New Orleans Sports Hall of Fame, and in 2008, he was inducted into the New Orleans Professional Baseball Hall of Fame. He is also a member of the Wheeling Hall of Fame and the Diamond Club Hall of Fame.

== Personal life and death ==
After, playing for the New Orleans Pelicans in 1954, Freese made New Orleans his home for the rest of his life. He had a long business career there after leaving baseball. He owned and operated the Basin Lounge sports tavern in New Orleans.

His older brother, George, briefly played Major League Baseball and was a longtime scout and Minor League Baseball (MiLB) manager.

Freese died on June 18, 2013, in Metairie, Louisiana. He was survived by his wife Mary, brother George Freese, three children, eight grandchildren and two great-grandchildren.
