= Early Wynn =

American baseball player (1920–1999)

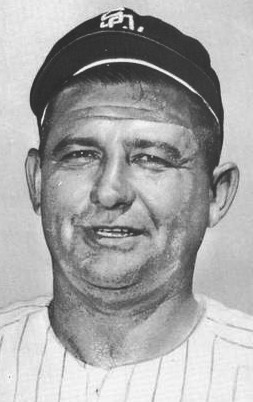
- Wynn, c. 1958
- Pitcher
- Born: January 6, 1920; Hartford, Alabama, U.S.
- Died: April 4, 1999 (aged 79); Venice, Florida, U.S.
- Batted: Switch Threw: Right

MLB debut
- September 13, 1939, for the Washington Senators

Last MLB appearance
- September 13, 1963, for the Cleveland Indians

MLB statistics
- Win–loss record: 300–244
- Earned run average: 3.54
- Strikeouts: 2,334
- Stats at Baseball Reference

Teams
- Washington Senators (1939, 1941–1944, 1946–1948); Cleveland Indians (1949–1957); Chicago White Sox (1958–1962); Cleveland Indians (1963)

Career highlights and awards
- 9× All-Star (1947, 1955–1960²); Cy Young Award (1959); 2× MLB wins leader (1954, 1959); AL ERA leader (1950); 2× AL strikeout leader (1957, 1958); Cleveland Guardians Hall of Fame; Washington Nationals Ring of Honor

Member of the National

Baseball Hall of Fame
- Induction: 1972
- Vote: 76.0% (fourth ballot)

Early Wynn Jr. (January 6, 1920 – April 4, 1999), nicknamed "Gus", was an American professional baseball right-handed pitcher. He played in Major League Baseball (MLB) for the Washington Senators, Cleveland Indians, and Chicago White Sox, during his 23-year MLB career. Wynn was identified as one of the most intimidating pitchers in the game, having combined his powerful fastball with a hard attitude toward batters. He was inducted into the Baseball Hall of Fame in 1972.

Wynn signed with the Senators at the age of 17, deciding to forgo completing his high school education to begin pursuing a baseball career. He spent three seasons in Minor League Baseball (MiLB) before achieving his first MLB stint in 1939. Wynn returned to the big leagues two years later and in 1942 pitched his first full MLB season. The following year, he won 18 games for the Senators. Drafted into the military in 1944, Wynn missed all of 1945 and a portion of the 1946 season while serving in the United States Army during World War II. He spent all of 1947 and 1948 with the Senators before getting traded to the Indians after the 1948 season.

With Cleveland, Wynn was a member of what historian David Fleitz called "one of the greatest pitching rotations of all time," along with Bob Feller, Mike Garcia, and Bob Lemon. Pitching coach Mel Harder taught him a curveball, slider, and knuckleball, which Wynn credited with helping him become a better pitcher in the 1950s. He won 20 or more games in four of his seasons with the Indians, helping them set an American League (AL) record with 111 total wins in 1954. He started Game 2 of the 1954 World Series, which the New York Giants won in four games. In 1955, he was selected to his first of eight straight All-Star Games. Traded to the White Sox after the 1957 season, Wynn won the 1959 Cy Young Award, leading the AL with 22 wins as the team won the AL pennant. At 39, he became the oldest pitcher to win the award, and he was not passed for 19 years. In Game 1 of the 1959 World Series, Wynn struck out six in seven innings, allowing no runs as the White Sox won 11–0. He made two other starts in the Series but failed to pitch past the fourth inning in either, as the Los Angeles Dodgers won the series in six games. Towards the end of his career, Wynn began to rely more heavily on the knuckleball, as the velocity of his pitches declined. The White Sox released him after the 1962 season, but Wynn signed with the Indians in 1963 because he was determined to win 300 games. He picked up his 300th victory against the Kansas City Athletics on July 13, his last major league win, though he remained on the roster for the rest of the season. As of 2025, he is one of 24 MLB pitchers to win 300 games.

After his retirement as a player, Wynn served as a pitching coach for the Indians from 1964 to 1966 and the Minnesota Twins from 1967 to 1969. He later was a broadcaster for the Toronto Blue Jays and White Sox. Wynn lived in Nokomis, Florida, for many years, operating the Early Wynn Steak House and Bowling Lanes in Venice, Florida, during the 1960s. In 1999, he was included on The Sporting News list of the 100 greatest players in baseball history. Wynn died that year in an assisted living facility following heart-related problems and a stroke.

== Early life ==
Wynn was born January 6, 1920, in Hartford, Alabama, the son of Blanche Wynn and Early Wynn Sr., an automobile mechanic and former semi-professional baseball player. Wynn described his ancestry as being Scottish, Irish, and Cherokee; sportswriter Lew Freedman speculates that Wynn was no more than 1/8 Cherokee. As a youth, Wynn lifted 500-pound bales of cotton one summer for 10 cents an hour; the experience left him determined to make a different living for himself. Excelling at both football and baseball, Wynn was about to become the top running back at Geneva County High School as a sophomore, but he suffered a broken leg on a punt return that year. The injury forced him out of football and focused his attention on baseball. Wynn later described it as "my best break ever."

When he was a teenager, Wynn attended a tryout session in Florida for the Washington Senators. He impressed Senators coach Clyde Milan enough that the organization offered him a minor league contract. Wynn signed with Washington for $100 per month and decided not to finish high school. Between 1937 and 1939, Wynn pitched minor league baseball in the Florida State League and the Piedmont League.

== Professional career ==
=== Washington Senators (1939, 1941–1944, 1946–1948) ===
Wynn made his Major League Baseball (MLB) debut in 1939, when he was a September callup by the Senators. He threw a complete game in his first outing on September 13, allowing four runs (three earned) in a 4–2 loss to the Chicago White Sox. Wynn made three starts, posting an 0–2 record and a 5.75 earned run average (ERA) before returning to the minor leagues for 1940 and most of 1941. David Fleitz of the Society for American Baseball Research wrote, "Wynn was not yet ready for major-league action." He made it back to the major leagues in 1941, when he was again a September callup. In his first start of the year, the second game of a doubleheader against the Philadelphia Athletics, he gave up two runs and six hits, earning his first major league win in a 4–2 Senator victory. He started five games this time, completing four of them and finishing with a 3–1 record and a 1.58 ERA.

In 1942, Wynn was named to Washington's four-man pitching rotation and spent the whole season in the major leagues for the first time. He threw a shutout on April 30 against the White Sox, allowing the Senators to win by scoring just one run. In the second game of a doubleheader against the New York Yankees on September 6, he gave up several runs–11, though only five were earned. The Senators lost 15–2. He pitched 30 games that season, finishing with a 10–16 record and a 5.12 ERA. The 16 losses ranked fifth in the American League (AL).

Wynn opened the 1943 season as the number two starter in the Senators' rotation, behind Dutch Leonard. On April 27, he threw 13 scoreless innings but received a no decision as Philadelphia defeated the Senators 2–1 in 16 innings. Against the Cleveland Indians on July 10, he allowed only four hits and threw a shutout in a 4–0 victory. He pitched 13 1/3 innings on August 18, losing the game 3–2 in the 14th to the White Sox when Guy Curtright singled to drive in a run; however, the two runs Wynn had allowed earlier were unearned. Four days later, in the second game of a doubleheader against the St. Louis Browns, Wynn hit his first major league home run against Bob Muncrief. He was less successful on the mound, allowing seven runs in six innings as the Browns won 8–5. On September 10, he held Philadelphia to three hits in a 5–0 victory. In the first game of a doubleheader against the Yankees on September 19, Wynn gave up two runs in 10 innings as the Senators won 3–2. In 37 games, he finished 18–12 with a 2.91 ERA and 89 strikeouts, leading the AL with 33 starts. Wynn finished 18th in AL Most Valuable Player (MVP) voting.

On April 20, 1944, Wynn threw a two-hit shutout against the Philadelphia Athletics. He held the Indians to three runs (two earned) over 13 innings on May 26 in a 5–3 victory. On June 18, he threw a four-hit shutout against the Boston Red Sox in a 1–0 victory. He had a 6–7 record entering June 29 but would lose 10 decisions in a row starting from that date and lasting through August 13, when he finally won another game. One of those losses in the second game of a doubleheader on July 4 came after Wynn had held the White Sox to two runs in 11 innings; he gave up a third run in the 12th, and Chicago defeated Washington by a score of 3–2. Though his season ended in late August, he led the league in losses in 1944, compiling an 8–17 record and a 3.38 ERA.

Wynn's 1944 season ended early, as he joined the United States Army on August 21. He underwent 17 weeks of training at Fort Knox before going to the Philippines to serve in the Tank Corps during World War II. Though he missed the 1945 major league season, Wynn continued to play baseball, pitching for a Pacific Army team known as the Manila Dodgers.

Returning to the United States in June 1946, Wynn was able to resume pitching for the Senators on July 16. He pitched 11 innings against the Yankees in the first game of a doubleheader on September 8, allowing only one run (unearned) and earning the victory in Washington's 2–1 triumph. In 17 games that year, he finished with an 8–5 record and a 3.11 ERA.

In 1947, Wynn was the Senators' Opening Day starter. He came within one out of completing the first game he won that season on April 23, getting relieved by Tom Ferrick with two outs in the ninth inning but still earning the win in a 4–3 triumph over Philadelphia. On June 5, he shut out the Indians in a 3–0 victory. Wynn was selected to the 1947 AL All-Star team for the first time as a replacement for an injured Bob Feller, but he did not pitch in the AL's 2–1 victory. In the first game of a doubleheader on July 10, he gave up 10 hits but threw a shutout in a 4–0 victory over the White Sox. On July 22, he gave up only two hits and one run (unearned) in a 6–1 victory over the Detroit Tigers. He pitched 33 games that year and earned a decision in almost every game, totaling 17 wins with 15 losses and a 3.64 ERA. After the season, he finished 23rd in AL MVP voting.

Wynn made the Opening Day start again for the Senators in 1948 but gave up 12 runs (10 earned) over 8 1/3 innings in a 12–4 loss to the Senators. On May 6, he limited Cleveland to three hits in a shutout as the Senators beat the Indians by a score of 5–0. He had a 7–7 record through the end of June but only won one more game the rest of the season (against the Indians on August 29), losing 12 games and posting a 6.96 ERA in the season's second half. In 1948, Wynn was the victim of inconsistency, posting an 8–19 record and a 5.82 ERA. He gave up a league-high 128 earned runs, and his 19 losses were third in the league (behind Fred Sanford's 21 and Bill Wight's 20). When hitting, though, he had a career-high 16 runs batted in (RBI).

During the offseason, the Senators made Wynn available for trade. The Boston Red Sox offered Johnny Pesky to Washington for Wynn in November, but the trade did not go through. However, Bill Veeck, who owned the Indians, had been trying to acquire Wynn since before the 1948 season. In December, Wynn and Mickey Vernon were sent to the Cleveland Indians in exchange for Joe Haynes, Ed Klieman and Eddie Robinson.

=== Cleveland Indians (1949–1957) ===
The Indians were excited about Wynn's potential, but they felt he needed more pitches to be truly successful. Though he threw a changeup, Wynn relied almost exclusively on his fastball and did not have any other pitches available at his disposal. Pitching coach Mel Harder, a four-time All-Star with the Indians in the 1930s, taught Wynn how to throw a curveball, slider, and knuckleball; Wynn had the curveball and slider "mastered" by the middle of the 1949 season, according to Fleitz. "I could throw the ball when I came here [to Cleveland],” remembered Wynn, “but Mel made a pitcher out of me." With Cleveland, he developed into a key part of what Fleitz called "one of the greatest pitching rotations of all time," joining Feller, Bob Lemon and Mike Garcia. Cleveland manager Al López later called those four pitchers "the greatest pitching staff I ever saw during 33 years in the majors."

Wynn pitched all 11 innings of a game against the White Sox on May 28, allowing two runs as the Indians prevailed 3–2. On June 3, Wynn held the Red Sox to four hits and one run as the Indians prevailed 8–1. Interestingly, though he was perfecting his new pitches as the 1949 season wore on, Wynn had more success earlier in the year. He had a 7–1 record with a 3.60 ERA through July 17; thereafter, he posted a 4–6 record with a 4.62 ERA. On August 2, he held his former team to one run in an 8–1 victory. Wynn's 23 starts were his fewest in a season not interrupted by military service since 1941; he posted an 11–7 record and a 4.15 ERA.

By 1950, Wynn was the number two starter in Cleveland's rotation, behind Lemon and ahead of Feller (third). From June 16 through July 9, he won six straight appearances, including a game on July 9 in which he pitched five shutout innings of relief. Wynn struck out a season-high 11 batters on July 6 in a 5–2 win over the White Sox. He limited the Tigers to two runs over 10 innings on August 14 in a 3–2 victory. Five days later, he held the White Sox to three hits and no runs in a 1–0 triumph. He shut out the White Sox again in his last start of the year on September 26, allowing six hits in a 2–0 victory. In 1950, he recorded 18 wins and led the AL with a 3.20 ERA, the highest of any player to lead the league in that category. Wynn also surpassed the 100-strikeout mark for the first time, finishing the year with 143. 1950 was the first of seven straight seasons in which Wynn would win at least 17 games.

On April 18, 1951, Wynn held the Tigers to two runs in 10 innings, earning the win in a 4–2 victory. Though he had a 3.62 ERA through June 17, Wynn's record was merely 4–8; he won 16 games after that date to earn his first 20-win season. On July 14, he held the Yankees to two hits and threw a shutout in an 8–0 victory. Five days later, Boston scored four runs against him in 11 innings, but Cleveland rallied from a 4–3 deficit in the 11th to win 5–4. In the first game of a doubleheader on August 19, he shut out the White Sox in a 4–0 victory. On August 28, he held the Athletics scoreless in a 1–0 victory. The victory started a streak of six straight decisions won by Wynn, lasting until his loss to the White Sox on September 25. Wynn tied for the AL lead in starts (34) and led the league with 274 1/3 innings pitched, finishing tied for fourth with 20 wins (along with Ned Garver and teammate Garcia), third in ERA (3.02, behind Saul Rogovin's 2.78 and Eddie Lopat's 2.91), and second in strikeouts (133, behind only Vic Raschi's 164). He finished 16th in AL MVP voting.

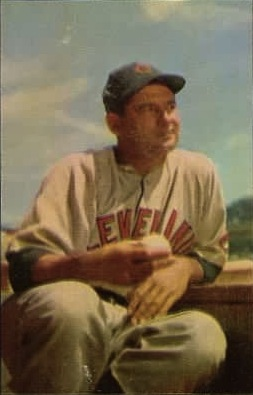
Wynn's baseball card in the 1953 Bowman set

Wynn made his first Opening Day start as an Indian in 1952. He held Boston to four hits on June 5, striking out eight batters as the Indians won 5–0. In the first game of a doubleheader against Detroit on July 4, he allowed just two hits as Cleveland won 11–0. Wynn was 16–9 through August 15, but he lost three appearances in a row to fall to 16–12 on August 24. He would not lose another game in 1952, winning all seven of his final starts. On September 5, he held the White Sox to four hits in a 3–0 victory. He shut out the Red Sox again on September 12, holding them to three hits in a 5–0 triumph. Wynn finished the year among AL leaders in several categories. He allowed the most home runs (23) and walks (132) of any AL pitcher, but his 2.90 ERA ranked tenth. His 23 wins ranked second to Bobby Shantz's 24, and his 153 strikeouts were topped only by Allie Reynolds's 160. This season, Wynn finished fifth in AL MVP voting.

In 1953, Wynn was the fourth starter in the Indians' rotation. In the first game of a doubleheader against the Senators on May 3, he allowed just three hits in a 7–0 shutout victory, striking out eight and also hitting a home run against Connie Marrero. On June 28, he held the Yankees to three hits and one run, hitting a home run against Tom Gorman in a 4–1 victory over the Yankees. Against the Yankees again on July 23, he struck out seven and allowed two runs in a 10–2 victory. He recorded 10 strikeouts in eight innings against the Red Sox on September 1, allowing three runs as the Indians won 13–3. In 36 games (34 starts), he had a 17–12 record and a 3.93 ERA. His 17 wins ranked ninth in the AL, and his 138 strikeouts ranked third (behind Billy Pierce's 186 and Virgil Trucks's 149).

Wynn made the Opening Day start for the Indians in 1954, his last of two he would make during his tenure with the team. On May 1, he held the Yankees to two runs and drove in two runs himself with an RBI single against Gorman as the Indians prevailed 10–2. Wynn held the Tigers to two hits on May 28 in a 3–0 victory. On July 15, he held the Athletics to three hits in a 4–0 shutout victory. He threw a second shutout against Detroit on August 18, allowing six hits in a 4–0 victory. In the second game of a doubleheader against New York on September 12, he struck out 12 Yankees in a 3–2 victory. Wynn finished the season with a 2.73 ERA (fourth in the AL), won 23 games (most in the AL) and struck out 155 batters (second to Bob Turley's 185). He led the AL in starts and innings pitched and finished sixth in MVP voting. The Indians won 111 regular season games during 1954, breaking an AL record previously held by the 1927 New York Yankees and earning Wynn his first playoff appearance. In the 1954 World Series against the New York Giants, Wynn started Game 2. He allowed three runs in seven innings, as the Giants defeated the Indians 3–1. That was Wynn's only appearance in the series, as the Giants won four straight games against Cleveland.

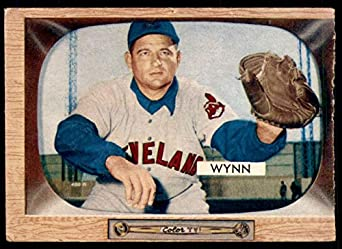
Wynn's baseball card in the 1955 Bowman set

Afflicted by pneumonia to begin the 1955 season, Wynn did not earn his first win until May. On May 22, he threw a shutout against the Tigers, allowing just one hit when Fred Hatfield singled in the fourth inning. On June 22, he struck out 10 batters in a 5–0 shutout victory over the Baltimore Orioles. Four days later, in the first game of a doubleheader, he recorded eight strikeouts and allowed just three hits in a 5–0 victory over the Yankees. On July 1, he threw a third shutout in a row as the Indians defeated the White Sox 1–0. He was an All-Star for the second time in his career and pitched three scoreless innings in the game. This selection marked the start of eight consecutive All-Star Games he would be selected to over the next six seasons. (Note: MLB held two All-Star Games a year from 1959 through 1962.) He finished the 1955 season with a 17–11 record and a 2.82 ERA. Wynn's 17 wins were tied with Turley for fourth in the AL (three pitchers had 18), his 2.82 ERA was third (behind Pierce's 1.97 and Whitey Ford's 2.63), and his 122 strikeouts ranked seventh. Also, his six shutouts were tied with Pierce and Turley for second, behind Billy Hoeft's seven. That season, Wynn began writing a column for The Cleveland News entitled The Wynn Mill, he did it without any assistance from ghostwriters despite the fact that he had never finished high school. He gave his opinions concerning everything from umpires to Indians coaches, to the frustration of Indians' general manager Hank Greenberg. Wynn donated his payment for the column to the Elks Club in Nokomis, Florida, where he lived during the offseason.

Wynn threw a shutout against the Yankees on June 8, 1956, allowing five hits in a 9–0 victory. He shut out the Red Sox on June 21, limiting them to four hits in a 5–0 victory. On July 18, he was struck in the face by a sharp line drive off the bat of Senators shortstop Jose Valdivielso. Replaced by Hank Aguirre on the mound, Wynn lost seven teeth from the impact. The facial wound required 16 stitches. He was pitching again four days later, holding the Orioles to six hits in an 8–0 shutout. On July 31, he shut out the Yankees for the second time that year, allowing three hits in a 5–0 victory. He picked up his 20th win of the year with a ten-inning effort against the Kansas City Athletics in a 4–1 victory. His 20 wins put him in a five-way tie for second in the AL, behind Frank Lary's 21. Wynn finished third in ERA (2.72, behind Ford's 2.47 and teammate Herb Score's 2.53) and seventh with 153 strikeouts. In AL MVP voting, Wynn ranked 13th.

In the first game of a doubleheader against the Tigers on April 28, 1957, Wynn took the loss but allowed just two runs and struck out a season-high 10 hitters. He struck out nine Yankees on June 27 in a 2–0 shutout. Seven days later, he had nine strikeouts again, allowing three hits and one unearned run in a 3–1 triumph over Detroit in the first game of a doubleheader. He struck out nine hitters on August 3 as well but gave up 10 hits and four runs in seven innings of a 5–3 loss to the Yankees. Wynn led the AL with 37 starts, but the 1957 season was his first losing season with Cleveland. His record was just 14–17, and his ERA of 4.31 was his highest as an Indian. He led the league in strikeouts (with a career-high 184), but he also led the league in hits (270) and earned runs (126) allowed. After the season, Wynn and Al Smith were traded to the Chicago White Sox for Minnie Miñoso and Hatfield. The trade reunited him with López, who had managed him with the Indians through the 1956 season.

=== Chicago White Sox (1958–1962) ===
Wynn's new contract with the White Sox forbade him from writing for newspapers (thus ending The Wynn Mill), but his salary was raised to make up for lost revenue. In his first start against Cleveland since the trade, Wynn threw a two-hit shutout on May 9, 1958. He held the Orioles scoreless on May 23, the necessary total for the White Sox to prevail 1–0. On June 19, he gave up just two hits against Boston in a 4–0 victory. He threw another two-hit shutout on August 31 in a 3–0 victory over Detroit. He had a winning record on September 9 but lost three of his final four starts to finish the year with a 14–16 record. In 1958, Wynn became the first MLB pitcher to lead his league in strikeouts in consecutive years with different teams (184 with Cleveland, 189 with Chicago). His ERA was 4.13.

Fleitz writes that in 1959, "everything clicked for both Wynn and the White Sox." He began relying further on the knuckleball, since his fastball was losing velocity. "For years they've been accusing me of throwing it when I didn't even know how to hold it ... I can't throw as hard as I did six, seven years ago. And I get tired quicker. I find that you can throw the knuckler with a little more effort and no strain", Wynn said. On May 1, Wynn became the second pitcher in major league history to win a game 1–0 while recording at least ten strikeouts and hitting a home run; Red Ruffing had done the same for the Yankees in 1932. He also allowed just one hit to Boston in the game. Wynn served as the starting pitcher in the first All-Star Game of the year on July 7, allowing one run in three innings and receiving a no-decision as the National League defeated the AL 5–4. He threw back-to-back shutouts on August 9 (second game of a doubleheader) and August 13, allowing three hits in each as the White Sox won both games 9–0. On September 8, he pitched 10 innings, allowing two runs to the Athletics as Chicago prevailed 3–2. Facing the Indians on September 22, Wynn picked up his 21st win, a victory that clinched the AL pennant for the White Sox. Wynn won the Cy Young Award in 1959 at the age of 39, posting a record of 22–10, with 179 strikeouts and a 3.17 ERA. He became the third-oldest MLB pitcher to win 20 games in a season, following Cy Young and Grover Cleveland Alexander. Wynn's 22 wins led the AL, his 3.17 ERA ranked ninth, his 179 strikeouts were third (behind Jim Bunning's 201 and Camilo Pascual's 179), his 255 2/3 innings pitched led the league, and his 37 starts tied Paul Foytack for most in the AL. He also ranked second in shutouts with five, one fewer than Pascual's total. Wynn was third in AL MVP voting, trailing teammates Nellie Fox and Luis Aparicio.

Wynn was "magnificent" in Game 1 of the 1959 World Series, according to Sports Illustrated. He allowed no runs, merely singles, to the Los Angeles Dodgers for seven innings before exiting because the cold weather was affecting his elbow; the White Sox defeated Los Angeles 11–0. In Game 4, he kept the Dodgers scoreless for the first two innings but allowed four runs (three earned) in the third inning before getting replaced with two outs by Turk Lown; the Dodgers won that game 5–4, though Wynn had a no-decision. He gave up a two-run home run to Duke Snider in the third inning of Game 6, then allowed three runs in the fourth inning, taking the loss in the 9–3 defeat as the Dodgers clinched the Series victory in six games.

In the first game of a doubleheader on May 15, 1960, Wynn shut out the Indians, limiting them to five hits in a 4–0 triumph. He lost five straight decisions from May 25 through June 18, but he won 11 of his next 15. In 1960, Wynn was selected to the All-Star Games for his seventh and last year, pitching two scoreless innings in the second All-Star Game, which the AL lost 6–0. On August 19, he shut out the Athletics, allowing seven hits as Chicago defeated Kansas City by a score of 10–0. His final two wins of the season were shutouts thrown within 12 days of each other in September, the first coming in a 1–0 victory over Boston on September 11. He finished the 1960 season with a 13–12 record (his fewest wins since 1949), a 3.49 ERA, and 158 strikeouts, the third-highest total in the AL (behind Bunning's 201 and Pedro Ramos's 160). Wynn also tied Ford and Jim Perry for the AL lead in shutouts, with four.

Wynn struck out a season-high seven batters in back-to-back wins on May 12 and May 16, 1961. He held Baltimore scoreless and pitched seven shutout innings with six strikeouts on July 22 but received a no-decision; the White Sox won 7–4. In 1961, Wynn was 8–2 but his season ended after the start against the Orioles because his gout, which had affected him since 1950, finally became too much for him to pitch through. He had 64 strikeouts and a 3.51 ERA. Wynn missed the rest of the season, even giving up eating meat in an attempt to get the ailment under control.

By 1962, Wynn had started pitching mainly with the slider and the knuckleball. By that season, he was the oldest player in the AL. Facing the Indians on May 28, he threw a three-hit shutout as Chicago won 2–0. His next win (over a month later) was also a shutout, when he struck out eight batters and allowed only five hits in a 7–0 victory over Cleveland. 24 days later, Wynn had another shutout in a five-hit, 6–0 victory over the Washington Senators. He pitched to a 7–15 record in 1962, with a 4.46 ERA (his highest since 1948) and just 91 strikeouts. The 15 losses were tied with Don Schwall's total for fourth in the AL, and his 4.46 ERA was 0.49 over the league average. Thinking he was finished, the White Sox released him after the season.

=== 1963: The pursuit of win #300 ===
Wynn, however, had picked up his 299th victory before the end of 1962 and was determined to get to 300 career wins. He attended spring training with the White Sox in 1963 failing to make the team. Several teams offered him one-game contracts, but Wynn held out for a full-time deal, which he got from the Indians on June 21. Cleveland then added him to the starting rotation to give him the opportunities he needed. He failed to win in his first three starts with the Indians that year, and the nine months and seven starts that had elapsed from 1962 to 1963 are still, as of 2007, the longest gap between any pitcher's 299th and 300th wins in MLB history.

The night before his fourth start of the year, against the Athletics on July 13, Wynn struggled to sleep due to gout-related pain. In that outing, Wynn finally picked up the milestone. Opposing Kansas City batter Ed Charles recalled Wynn's performance: "His fastball, if it reached 80, that was stretching it. He was laboring, throwing nothing but bloopers and junk." He left the game with a 5–4 lead after pitching five innings. "Jerry Walker relieved me and saved the game for me. He was my roommate and pitched like a man possessed", Wynn recalled. Long after his retirement, which came at the end of the 1963 season, Wynn reflected on his 300th win stating he was not proud of the milestone. "If I had pitched a good game and gone nine innings, that would be something. But that's not the way it was", Wynn said. He remains one of only 24 pitchers to win 300 games.

Following the 300th win, Wynn made just one more start, a 3–2 win over Kansas City on July 27 (though Wynn received a no-decision because he was removed from the game in the fifth inning). He did make several relief appearances for the Indians before the end of the season. His last of these came on September 13, when he entered a game against the Los Angeles Angels in relief of Jack Kralick with two outs in the sixth inning with runners on first and second. Wynn gave up an RBI single to Jim Fregosi, then got Charlie Dees to line out to shortstop to end the inning. Lifted in favor of pinch-hitter Willie Kirkland in the bottom of the inning, Wynn had pitched his last game. In 20 games (five starts), Wynn had a 1–2 record, a 2.28 ERA, and 29 strikeouts. After the season, he retired.

== Legacy ==
Wynn approached the game with passion, sometimes throwing chairs in frustration after losses. He also hated getting removed from games, once throwing a baseball at López when the manager walked to the mound to remove him (though Wynn apologized to López after the game). First afflicted by gout in 1950, he endured pain through much of the second half of his career. Nevertheless, he was the first player to pitch at least 23 seasons in the major leagues, and he appeared in games over four decades. His durability helped him lead the AL in innings three times (1951, 1954, 1959) and propelled him to an AL record for most years pitched (23). Wynn won an even 300 games, 23rd most by any major leaguer. He registered five 20-win seasons, 2,334 strikeouts, 290 complete games, 49 shutouts, and 4,556 innings pitched in 691 games.

In the 1950s, Wynn had more strikeouts (1,544) than any other pitcher in the major leagues. He was one of the best hitting pitchers of his day as well. A switch hitter, Wynn batted .214 (365-for-1,704), with 17 home runs and 173 RBI. His 90 pinch-hit appearances included a grand slam (which he hit with the Senators on September 15, 1946), making him one of five MLB pitchers to record a grand slam as a pinch-hitter.

As of 2020, Wynn still ranks among the Indians' career leaders in many categories. He is fifth in wins (164), tied for fourth in strikeouts (1,277, equal to Lemon's total), seventh in shutouts (24), and seventh in total games started (296). In 1999, The Sporting News ranked Wynn number 100 on their list of the 100 Greatest Baseball Players.

== Later life ==
Wynn remained with the Indians following retirement, becoming their pitching coach in 1964. Several of his players – including Sam McDowell, Sonny Siebert, Luis Tiant and Steve Hargan – were still with the team in 1967 when they set a record for team strikeouts in a season with 1189. Tommy John considered him "abrasive" and not "very informative or helpful," though Wynn did teach John how to throw a slider. In August 1965, Wynn flirted with the idea of making a comeback as a knuckleball pitcher. Wynn left Cleveland after the 1966 season and joined the Minnesota Twins as pitching coach. He later served as a minor league manager for the Twins. Off the field, Wynn advocated for better pensions for retired baseball players.

Wynn proposed the idea of a one-game comeback to the Twins in 1970. In 1972, the Twins considered activating the 52-year-old Wynn to pitch one inning if retired star Ted Williams would hit against him. The move would have made Wynn the first player to pitch in five different decades, but Williams was not interested and the team dropped the idea. Williams called him "the toughest pitcher I ever faced."

In 1972, Wynn was elected to the Baseball Hall of Fame along with Sandy Koufax and Yogi Berra. He was disappointed that he had not received the required votes on his first three ballots, but he was grateful for the honor. "I'd been hoping for it, but I didn't want to build up my hopes too high," he said. "It's like being placed up there on a pedestal, not like getting a gold watch for your longtime efforts. It's recognition I was waiting for a long time." He was inducted as a member of the Indians on his plaque.

From their inaugural 1977 season through the end of the 1981 season, Wynn provided the color commentary for radio broadcasts of Toronto Blue Jays games, working alongside Tom Cheek. He also provided color commentary for Chicago White Sox radio broadcasts in 1982 and 1983, paired with Joe McConnell. When he was replaced by Lorn Brown in December 1983, White Sox president Eddie Einhorn described Wynn as "a link to baseball's past."

In the last years of his life, Wynn suffered a heart attack and a stroke. His health had declined after the death of his second wife in 1994. He moved to an assisted living facility in Venice, Florida, where he died in April 1999. Wynn's body was cremated, and his family kept his ashes.

In 2013, the Bob Feller Act of Valor Award honored Wynn as one of 37 Baseball Hall of Fame members for his service in the United States Army during World War II.

== Personal life ==
Wynn married Mabel Allman in 1939. She was killed in a car accident in 1942. They had one child together, son Joe, whom Wynn's relatives helped to raise after Mabel's death. In the fall of 1944, just after entering the Army, Wynn married his second wife, Lorraine Follin. They later had a daughter, Sherry. Early and Lorraine resided in Nokomis, Florida. Wynn had several hobbies, including flying his Cessna 170, hunting, and operating powerboats. In the 1960s, he owned the Early Wynn Steak House and Bowling Lanes in Venice, Florida.

== Toughness ==
Wynn was remembered for his toughness and for the frequency with which he threw at batters. He once stated, "I'd knock down my own grandmother if she dug in on me." He also said to reporters: "Why should I worry about hitters? Do they worry about me? Do you ever find a hitter crying because he's hit a line drive through the box? My job is getting hitters out. If I don't get them out I lose. I don't like losing a game any more than a salesman likes losing a big sale. I've got a right to knock down anybody holding a bat." When he was then asked whether he would have the same opinion if the batter were his own mother, he paused, then responded, "Mother was a pretty good curveball hitter."

In fact, when Wynn was with the Indians, he actually threw a pitch at his own 15-year-old son, Joe. Wynn was throwing pre-game batting practice to Joe, and Joe hit two long drives in a row. Ushers in the nearly empty stadium began to clap. Moments later, Joe was lying flat on his back in the batting cage, frightened by his father's knockdown pitch. (Note: A knockdown pitch is "a pitch aimed so close to the body that the batter must drop to the ground to avoid being hit.") Wynn said later, "He was leaning in on me, and I had to show him who was boss." (Note: In Roger Kahn's version of the incident, the knockdown pitch occurred after Joe hit one long drive, and Wynn then said to his son, "You shouldn't crowd me.")

His attitude was encouraged early in his career by manager Bucky Harris, who ordered Wynn to throw brushback pitches (Note: A brushback pitch is "a pitch aimed close to the body so that the batter must step back to avoid it.") when he got two strikes on a batter. Otherwise he faced a $25 fine. "I was making $350 a month. I couldn't afford giving up $25", Wynn said. Whenever an opposing batter lined one of his pitches back toward the mound, Wynn would retaliate by throwing a brushback pitch at the batter the next time the batter faced him. "That space between the white lines – that's my office, that's where I conduct my business,” he said in an interview with sportswriter Red Smith. “You take a look at the batter's box, and part of it belongs to the hitter. But when he crowds in just that hair, he's stepping into my office, and nobody comes into my office without an invitation when I'm going to work."

In 1962, when Wynn was with the White Sox, he was throwing batting practice and his teammate Joe Cunningham hit a line drive that missed Wynn by inches. Wynn responded by throwing three straight pitches under his teammate's chin. Whenever one of his teammates was knocked down by an opposing pitcher, Wynn would retaliate by knocking down two of the opposing pitcher's teammates. According to Minnesota Twins player Rod Carew, Wynn's competitiveness did not end when his playing career did. As the Twins pitching coach from 1967 to 1969, "Early would knock you down in batting practice. If you hit a ball good off of him, he'd knock you down and then challenge you. He told you to expect it when you stepped in the cage against him."

== See also ==
- 300 win club
- List of Major League Baseball career wins leaders
- List of Major League Baseball annual ERA leaders
- List of Major League Baseball annual strikeout leaders
- List of Major League Baseball annual wins leaders
- List of Major League Baseball all-time leaders in home runs by pitchers
- List of Major League Baseball players who played in four decades
- List of Major League Baseball career strikeout leaders
- TSN Pitcher of the Year (1959)

== Notes ==
Sporting positions
Preceded by Mel Harder	Cleveland Indians pitching coach 1964–1966	Succeeded by Clay Bryant
Preceded by Johnny Sain	Minnesota Twins pitching coach 1967–1969	Succeeded by Art Fowler
