= Shigeru Kobayashi =

Japanese baseball player (1952–2010)

- Pitcher
- Born: November 14, 1952; Tōhaku, Tottori
- Died: January 17, 2010 (aged 57); Fukui, Fukui
- Batted: Right Threw: Right

NPB debut
- September 26, 1973, for the Yomiuri Giants

Last appearance
- October 22, 1983, for the Hanshin Tigers

NPB statistics
- Win–loss record: 139–95
- Earned run average: 3.18
- Strikeouts: 1,273
- Stats at Baseball Reference

Teams
- As player: Yomiuri Giants (1973–1979); Hanshin Tigers (1979–1983); As coach: Kintetsu Buffaloes/Osaka Kintetsu Buffaloes (1997–2001); SK Wyverns (2007); Hokkaido Nippon-Ham Fighters (2009)

Career highlights and awards
- 2x Eiji Sawamura Award (1977, 1979); 1973 Japan Series champion; 2007 Korean Series champion

Shigeru Kobayashi (小林 繁, Kobayashi Shigeru; November 14, 1952 – January 17, 2010) was a Japanese baseball pitcher.

He played for the Yomiuri Giants and the Hanshin Tigers of Nippon Professional Baseball. His trade to the Tigers gave the Giants Suguru Egawa, as he had been drafted by the Tigers, despite him signing with the Giants in secrecy. Kobayashi coached two other NPB teams, the Osaka Kintetsu Buffaloes and the Hokkaido Nippon-Ham Fighters, and also spent a season in the Korea Baseball Organization as a coach for the SK Wyverns.

He died of heart failure in 2010 at the age of 57.
