= Dick Gernert =

American baseball player (1928–2017)

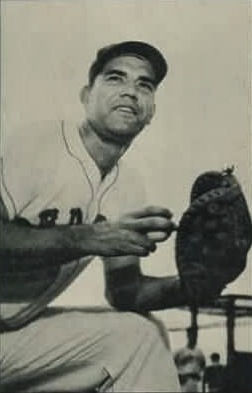
- Gernert in 1953
- First baseman
- Born: September 28, 1928; Reading, Pennsylvania, U.S.
- Died: November 30, 2017 (aged 89); Reading, Pennsylvania, U.S.
- Batted: Right Threw: Right

MLB debut
- April 16, 1952, for the Boston Red Sox

Last MLB appearance
- May 9, 1962, for the Houston Colt .45s

MLB statistics
- Batting average: .254
- Home runs: 103
- Runs batted in: 402
- Stats at Baseball Reference

Teams
- Boston Red Sox (1952–1959); Chicago Cubs (1960); Detroit Tigers (1960–1961); Cincinnati Reds (1961); Houston Colt .45s (1962)

Richard Edward Gernert (September 28, 1928 – November 30, 2017), was an American professional baseball first baseman, outfielder and coach, who played in Major League Baseball (MLB) for the Boston Red Sox (1952–1959), Chicago Cubs (1960), Detroit Tigers (1960–1961), Cincinnati Reds (1961) and Houston Colt .45's (1962). He threw and batted right-handed. During his playing days, Gernert stood 6 feet 3 inches (1.91 m) tall, weighing 209 pounds (95 kg). His uncle, Dom Dallessandro, was also a Major Leaguer.

Although Gernert spent much of the 1950s with the Red Sox, he often found himself sharing the first-base job with players such as Vic Wertz, Norm Zauchin and Mickey Vernon. A powerful right-handed batter, he was signed to take advantage of the Green Monster at Fenway Park. Gernert batted a career-high .291 in 1956 and topped the 20-homer mark in 1953 and 1958.

In 11 MLB seasons, Gernert played in 835 games and had 2,493 at bats, 357 runs, 632 hits, 104 doubles, eight triples, 103 home runs, 402 runs batted in (RBI), 10 stolen bases, and 363 walks. He posted a .254 batting average, .351 on-base percentage, .426 slugging percentage, 1,061 total bases, 10 sacrifice hits, 13 sacrifice flies, and 12 intentional walks.

Gernert was involved in the first interleague trade without waivers in baseball history, on November 21, 1959, when Boston shipped him to the Cubs for first baseman Jim Marshall and pitcher Dave Hillman. Gernert helped the Reds win the 1961 National League pennant, as a pinch hitter; however, in that World Series, which the Reds lost to the New York Yankees in five games, he was 0–4 in pinch-hitting roles.

After his playing days ended, Gernert was a coach for the Texas Rangers (1975–1976), a minor league manager, and longtime scout for numerous teams, most notably the New York Mets. Gernert died on November 30, 2017, at 89 years of age.
