= 2010 World Series =

2010 Major League Baseball season

- Official 2010 World Series logo
Team (Wins)	Managers	Season
San Francisco Giants (4)	Bruce Bochy	92–70 (.568), GA: 2
Texas Rangers (1)	Ron Washington	90–72 (.556), GA: 9
- Dates: October 27 – November 1
- Venue(s): AT&T Park (San Francisco); Globe Life Park in Arlington (Texas)
- MVP: Édgar Rentería (San Francisco)
- Umpires: John Hirschbeck (crew chief), Sam Holbrook, Bill Miller, Mike Winters, Jeff Kellogg, Gary Darling
- Hall of Famers: Giants: None; Rangers: Vladimir Guerrero

Broadcast
- Television: Fox (United States); MLB International (International)
- TV announcers: Joe Buck and Tim McCarver (Fox); Gary Thorne and Rick Sutcliffe (MLB International)
- Radio: ESPN; KNBR (SF); KESN (TEX)
- Radio announcers: Jon Miller and Joe Morgan (ESPN); Duane Kuiper, Dave Flemming and Mike Krukow (KNBR); Eric Nadel and Dave Barnett (KESN)
- ALCS: Texas Rangers over New York Yankees (4–2)
- NLCS: San Francisco Giants over Philadelphia Phillies (4–2)

The 2010 World Series was the championship series of Major League Baseball's (MLB) 2010 season. The 106th edition of the World Series, it was a best-of-seven playoff played between the American League (AL) champion Texas Rangers and the National League (NL) champion San Francisco Giants; the Giants won the series, four games to one, to secure their first World Series championship since 1954 and their first since relocating to San Francisco from New York City in 1958, ending the Curse of Coogan's Bluff. The series began on Wednesday, October 27, and ended on Monday, November 1.

In their respective League Championship Series, the Rangers and the Giants eliminated the 2009 World Series teams—the New York Yankees and the Philadelphia Phillies—each in six games. The Rangers' victory in the AL Championship Series gave the franchise its first World Series appearance in its 50-year history, dating from their inauguration as the second Washington Senators club in 1961. Meanwhile, the victory in the NL Championship Series gave the Giants their fourth World Series appearance since moving to San Francisco prior to the 1958 season; their most recent appearance had been in the 2002 World Series, when they lost to the Anaheim Angels in seven games. Coincidentally, the Giants and Rangers faced off in the first regular-season interleague game, on June 12, 1997, at the Ballpark in Arlington; Rangers reliever Darren Oliver, then in his first stint with the club, threw the game's first pitch.

The Giants had home-field advantage for the World Series (the first NL champions since 2001), because the NL won the All-Star Game, 3–1, on July 13. For the second consecutive year, Series games were scheduled for earlier start times to attract younger viewers. First pitch was just before 8:00 p.m. EDT for most games, with Game 3 starting at 7:00 p.m. EDT as part of a "family night" promotion and Game 4 starting at 8:20 p.m. EDT to accommodate Fox's NFL coverage.

San Francisco landmarks, such as Coit Tower, the Ferry Building, and San Francisco City Hall, were illuminated with orange lighting at night during the postseason. An exclusive VIP party was held on the eve of the World Series at the California Academy of Sciences (in Golden Gate Park); most media were not allowed near the event. San Francisco mayor Gavin Newsom made a friendly wager with Arlington mayor Robert Cluck, agreeing that "the losing city's mayor will travel to the winning city and join the winning city's mayor in a day of support for local youth and community service initiatives, with both mayors wearing the jersey of the World Series Champion team." With three games slated in Arlington, this marked the 5th time the same city hosted both a World Series game and the upcoming Super Bowl (Los Angeles 1966–67, Minneapolis 1991–92, Atlanta 1999–2000, Tampa 2008–09).

== Background ==
=== Texas Rangers ===
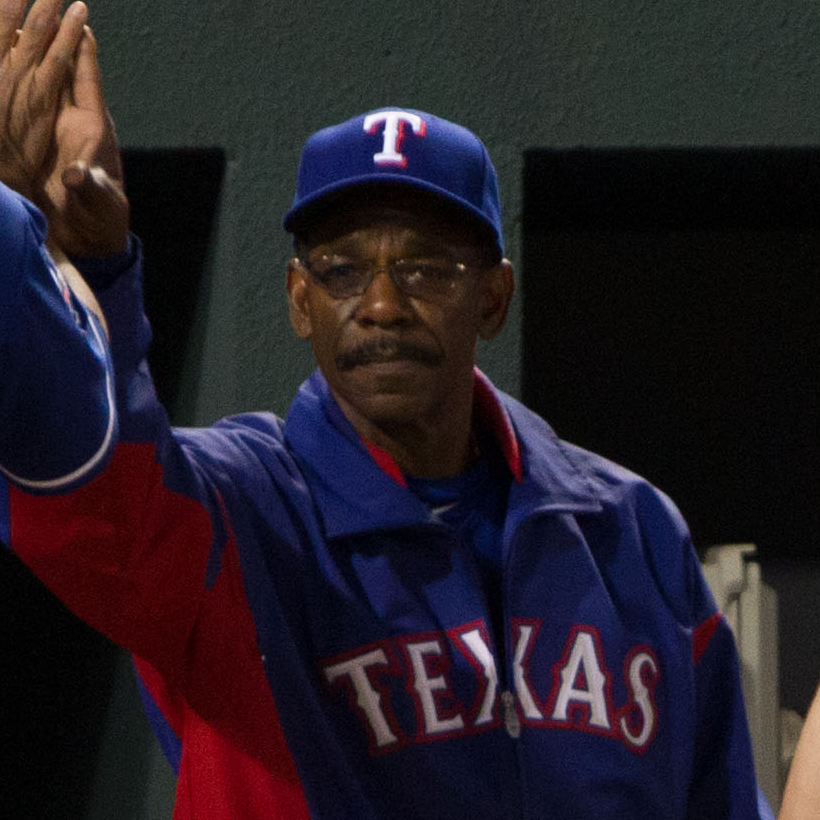
Ron Washington led the Rangers to the World Series for the first time in franchise history.

The Rangers and their fans had a long history of futility and disappointment. Enfranchised in 1961 as the second iteration of the Washington Senators, the team only had one season with a winning percentage above .500 out of 11 seasons in Washington, D.C.. The team relocated to Arlington, Texas, for the 1972 season but failed to make the postseason for over 20 years. Despite being 10 games under .500, the Rangers were leading the American League West division on August 12, 1994, when the 1994–95 Major League Baseball strike began and the remainder of the season was cancelled. They went on to win three division titles in 1996, 1998, and 1999, but were eliminated by the New York Yankees in the ALDS each time, having only won one game out of all three series combined. The Rangers' last postseason appearance before 2010 was in 1999. At the time, the Rangers were the only team to have never advanced past the first round of the playoffs and one of three (the others being the Seattle Mariners - who are still without a World Series appearance, and the Washington Nationals - who most recently won the World Series in 2019) to have never appeared in the World Series.

Heading into 2010, the Rangers were plagued with off-field issues. During spring training, manager Ron Washington admitted to prior cocaine use and failing a drug test during the 2009 season. Additionally, the team's owner, Tom Hicks, had financial problems dating back to 2008, which culminated in the team declaring bankruptcy in May and being sold to a partnership led by Chuck Greenberg and team president Nolan Ryan in August.

In the offseason, Iván Rodríguez, Marlon Byrd, Omar Vizquel, and Andruw Jones all departed due to free agency. Kevin Millwood was traded to the Baltimore Orioles for Chris Ray, who in turn was traded to the Giants mid-season. Notable offseason additions to the Rangers included starting pitcher Rich Harden, previously of the Chicago Cubs; starting pitcher Colby Lewis, previously of Nippon Professional Baseball's Hiroshima Toyo Carp; and designated hitter Vladimir Guerrero, previously of the Los Angeles Angels of Anaheim. Notable midseason roster moves include the aforementioned trade of Chris Ray to San Francisco in exchange for catcher Bengie Molina, and the trade of Justin Smoak and three minor-leaguers to the Seattle Mariners for starting pitcher Cliff Lee and relief pitcher Mark Lowe. The Rangers also traded two minor leaguers to the Florida Marlins in exchange for Jorge Cantú, and Joaquín Árias to the New York Mets in exchange for Jeff Francoeur.

The Rangers spent most of the season in first place in the American League West, with both the Los Angeles Angels of Anaheim and Seattle Mariners failing to live up to expectations by ESPN critics. They took first place for good on June 8, following a brief one-day stint in first place by the Angels, and finished the season with a 90–72 record, nine games ahead of the second-place Oakland Athletics. Their .556 winning percentage was the lowest among all eight 2010 postseason teams.

In the postseason, the third-seeded Rangers faced the top-seeded Tampa Bay Rays in the ALDS. The Rangers won the first two games at Tropicana Field by wide margins, bringing the Rays to the brink of elimination; however, the Rays won the next two games at Rangers Ballpark in Arlington to force a deciding Game 5 at Tropicana Field. Game 5 was another decisive Rangers victory, as ace Cliff Lee stymied the Rays and the offense struck Rays ace David Price once again. This was the first postseason series win in franchise history; additionally, the Rangers were the last team that had never won a postseason series. In the ALCS, the Rangers faced the wild-card winning New York Yankees, to whom they had lost all three of their previous postseason appearances. The Yankees had swept the second-seeded Minnesota Twins in their ALDS. The Rangers held a 5–0 lead in Game 1, only to see the Yankees come back and beat them 6–5. However, the next three games were all blowouts, as the Rangers took a 3–1 series lead. The Yankees won Game 5 by a large margin, but were once again routed in Game 6, 6–1, behind a series-winning hit by Vladimir Guerrero. Josh Hamilton's MVP performance included four home runs, tying an ALCS record, and helped the Rangers reach their first World Series. It also marked the first time since 1991 that the AL West champion won the pennant. The Angels' 2002 win was as the wild card team.

=== San Francisco Giants ===
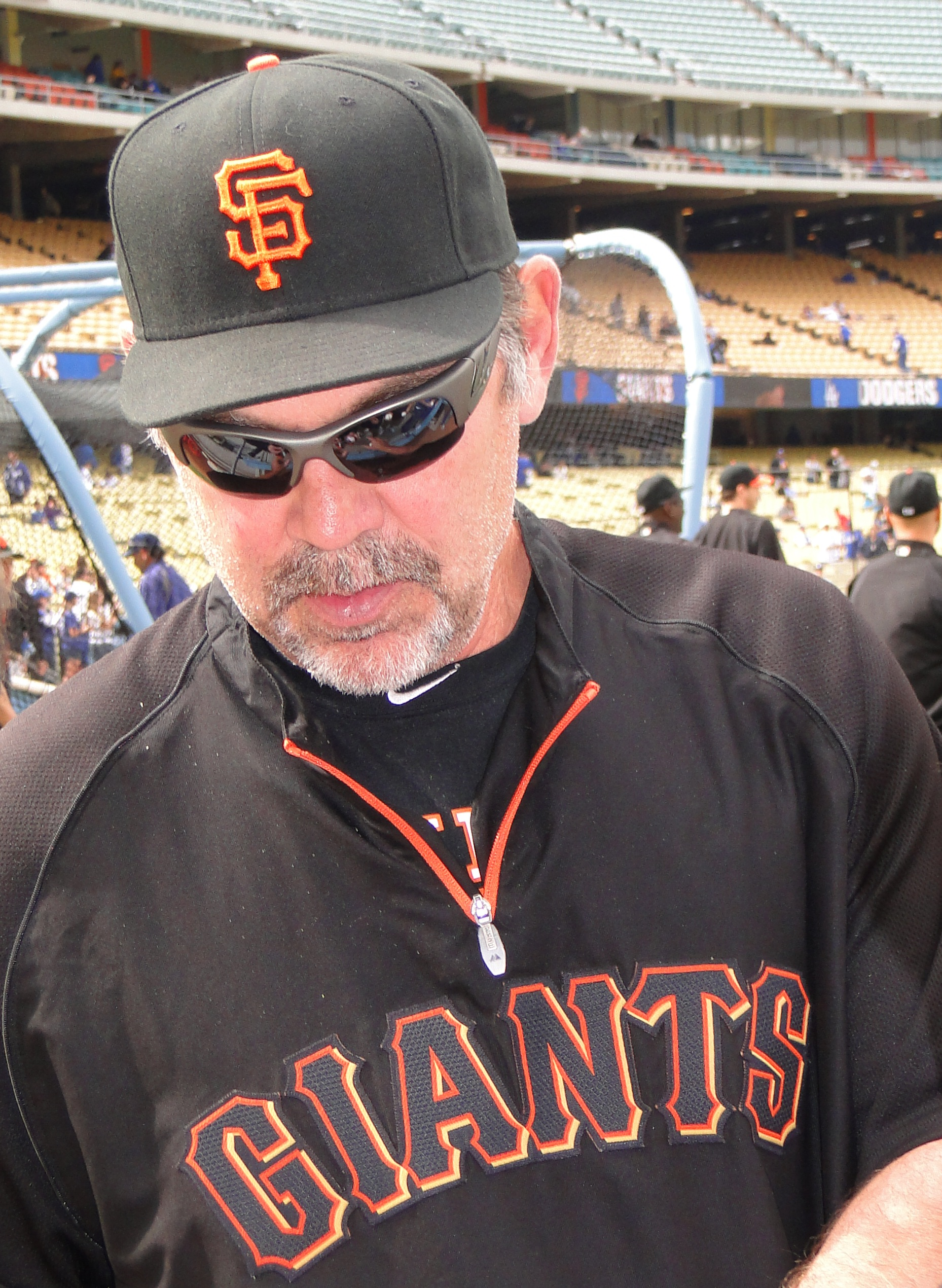
Bruce Bochy sought his first World Series win as a manager after previously appearing in the 1998 series.

Like the Rangers, the Giants and their fans had a long history of futility and disappointment since their move from New York City to San Francisco before the 1958 season. The Giants had won their last World Series against the Cleveland Indians in 1954. After moving to San Francisco, enraged Giants fans in New York allegedly placed a hex on the franchise, starting the Curse of Coogan's Bluff that would last for over 50 years. Within that period, they made it to the World Series three times, but lost each time. These included a seven-game loss to the New York Yankees in 1962, a four-game sweep by their cross-bay rival Oakland Athletics in 1989 that was marred by the Loma Prieta earthquake, and another seven-game loss to the Anaheim Angels in 2002 after being six outs away from the title in Game 6 with a 5–3 lead in the bottom of the eighth. Their last postseason appearance was in 2003, when they lost to the eventual World Series champion Florida Marlins in the NLDS.

The Giants entered 2010 with a strong pitching staff led by two-time Cy Young Award winner Tim Lincecum and a solid bullpen spearheaded by closer Brian Wilson. Notable offseason acquisitions included free agents Mark DeRosa, previously of the St. Louis Cardinals; and Aubrey Huff, previously of the Detroit Tigers. Over the course of the season, the Giants' front office made a series of moves to bolster their offense. Free agent Pat Burrell was signed in late May after he was released by the Tampa Bay Rays, while Buster Posey—who had started the season at Triple-A Fresno—was called up in late May and became the starting catcher after the Giants traded Bengie Molina to the Texas Rangers. In August, José Guillén was acquired in a trade with the Kansas City Royals, and Cody Ross was claimed off waivers from the Florida Marlins.

The Giants spent much of the early part of the season in second or third place in the National League West standings, trailing the San Diego Padres and on occasion the Los Angeles Dodgers or Colorado Rockies. They entered the All-Star break in fourth place, trailing the Padres, Rockies, and Dodgers. However, they finished July in second place behind the Padres, with a record of 20–8 for the month. On August 26, the Padres began a ten-game losing streak that allowed the Giants to gain some ground. The Giants tied the Padres for first place on September 10 and the two teams traded the top spot for the next 15 days. Then, the Giants took the lead for good on September 26, when they began a four-game winning streak coupled with the Padres' three-game losing streak. The Giants were three games ahead of the Padres going into the final weekend of the season, a three-game set between the two teams that the Padres needed to sweep in order to force a tie-breaker. The Padres won the first two games, but the Giants prevailed in the final game, 3–0, to clinch the franchise's seventh NL West championship.

In the Division Series, the second-seeded Giants faced the wild card-winning Atlanta Braves, who had also clinched a postseason berth on the last day of the regular season. Each game was decided by one run, with the Giants winning the series three games to one. The Giants won behind Lincecum's 14 strikeouts in Game 1 and earned come-from-behind wins in Games 3 and 4. In the NLCS, the Giants were heavy underdogs to the two-time defending National League champion Philadelphia Phillies, the overall #1 seed in the postseason. Ross' two home runs in Game 1 off Phillies ace Roy Halladay helped the Giants win the opener 4–3. They lost Game 2, but rebounded in Game 3 thanks to Matt Cain's strong performance and more timely hitting by Ross. Game 4 saw the Giants win on a walk-off sac fly by Juan Uribe. With the Phillies winning Game 5, 4–2, the series was sent back to Philadelphia. The Phillies took a 2–0 lead in the first inning of Game 6, but the Giants tied the game in the third and their steady bullpen held the Phillies' offense scoreless the rest of the way. This effort by the Giants bullpen included relief appearances by Tim Lincecum and Madison Bumgarner, who were both part of the Giants playoff rotation. In the eighth, Uribe hit a home run to right that barely cleared the wall and gave the Giants a 3–2 lead. Wilson came on for a five-out save to clinch the series. This marked the first time that the NL West champion had made it to the World Series since the Arizona Diamondbacks did so in 2001 (the Giants' 2002 appearance and the Colorado Rockies' 2007 appearance were both as wild card winners).

== Summary ==
San Francisco won the series, 4–1.

Game	Date	Score	Location	Time	Attendance
1	October 27	Texas Rangers – 7, San Francisco Giants – 11	AT&T Park	3:36	43,601
2	October 28	Texas Rangers – 0, San Francisco Giants – 9	AT&T Park	3:17	43,622
3	October 30	San Francisco Giants – 2, Texas Rangers – 4	Rangers Ballpark in Arlington	2:51	52,419
4	October 31	San Francisco Giants – 4, Texas Rangers – 0	Rangers Ballpark in Arlington	3:09	51,920
5	November 1	San Francisco Giants – 3, Texas Rangers – 1	Rangers Ballpark in Arlington	2:32	52,045

== Matchups ==
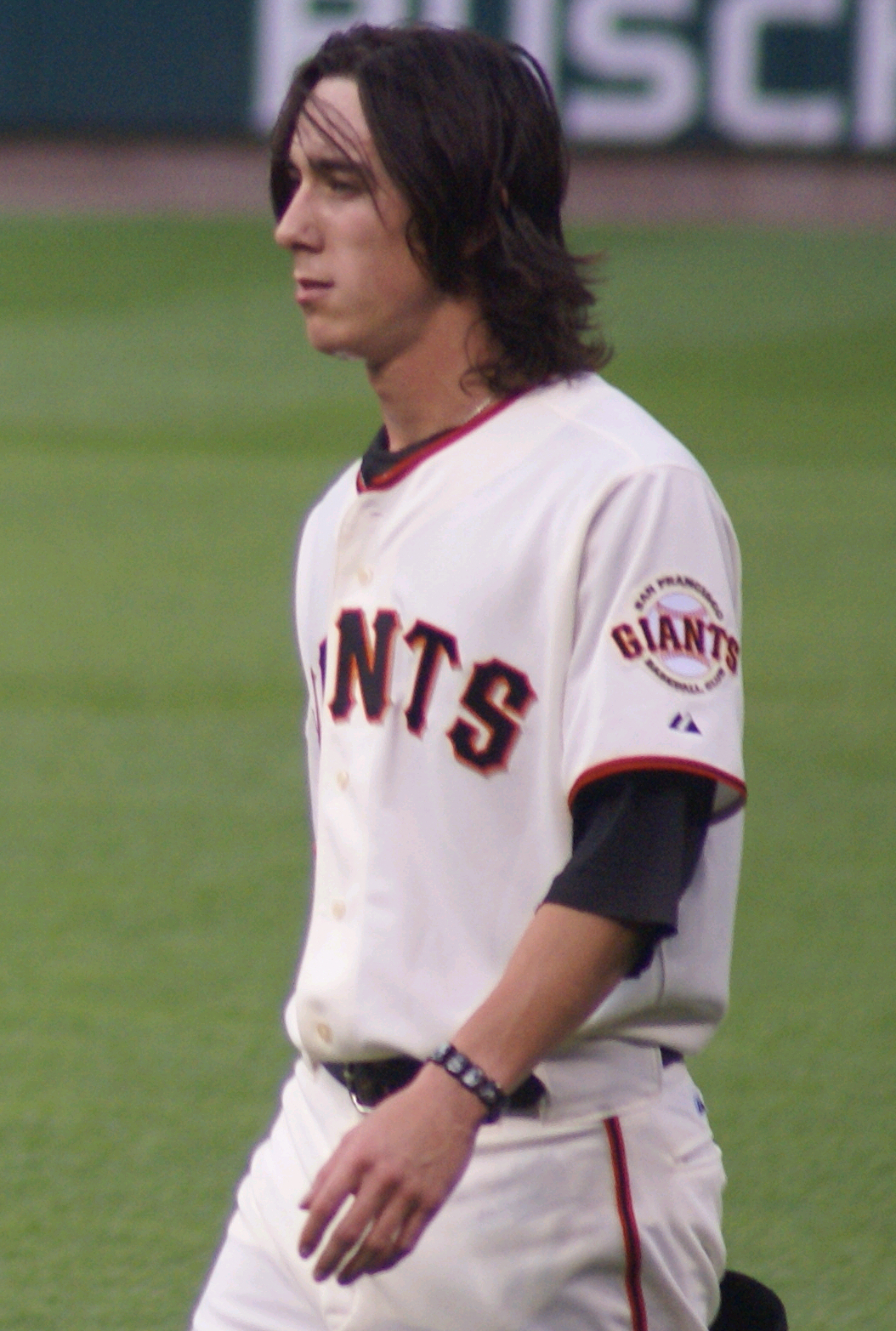
Tim Lincecum, the winning pitcher in Game 1.

=== Game 1 ===
October 27, 2010 4:59 pm (PDT) at AT&T Park in San Francisco, California 61 °F (16 °C), cloudy
Team	1	2	3	4	5	6	7	8	9	R	H	E
Texas	1	1	0	0	0	2	0	0	3	7	11	4
San Francisco	0	0	2	0	6	0	0	3	X	11	14	2
WP: Tim Lincecum (1–0) LP: Cliff Lee (0–1); Home runs: TEX: None; SF: Juan Uribe (1); Attendance: 43,601; Boxscore

The anticipated pitchers' duel between former Cy Young Award winners Cliff Lee and Tim Lincecum never materialized, as Lincecum gave up two early runs and Lee gave up seven runs—six of which were earned—in 4 2/3 innings. In the first inning, Lincecum gave up a hit and a walk, respectively, to the first two batters he faced: Elvis Andrus and Michael Young. Andrus scored on a Vladimir Guerrero single that struck Lincecum's leg and bounced into right field. In the second, Bengie Molina singled, advanced to third on a Lee double, and scored on Andrus' sacrifice fly. In the bottom of the third inning, Édgar Rentería reached on an error and advanced to second when Lee hit Andrés Torres. Rentería scored on a Freddy Sanchez RBI double, and Torres scored on a Buster Posey RBI single, tying the game.

In the bottom of the fifth inning, Torres doubled and scored on another Sanchez double. Lee then walked Pat Burrell and gave up back-to-back singles to Cody Ross and Aubrey Huff, which scored Sanchez and Burrell, respectively. Lee was then relieved by Darren O'Day, who gave up a three-run home run to Juan Uribe that increased the Giants' lead to six runs. In the top of the sixth inning, Lincecum struck out the first two batters he faced, but walked Ian Kinsler, who scored on a Molina double. Molina advanced to third on a Mitch Moreland single and scored on a David Murphy single. Lincecum was then removed from the game, having gone 5 2/3 innings.

The Giants piled on to their lead in the bottom of the eighth. Rangers reliever Mark Lowe gave up a single to Rentería, who advanced to third on a Vladimir Guerrero fielding error. Rentería then scored on pinch hitter Travis Ishikawa's double. Sanchez singled to score Ishikawa, and advanced to second on another Guerrero error. Lowe recorded one more out before being relieved by Michael Kirkman. Kirkman promptly gave up a single to Nate Schierholtz that scored Sanchez.

In the top of the ninth, Giants reliever Ramón Ramírez gave up a single to pinch hitter Julio Borbon and walked Andrus before being relieved by Jeremy Affeldt. Affeldt threw a wild pitch and walked Josh Hamilton to load the bases, and was relieved by closer Brian Wilson. Guerrero hit a sacrifice fly that scored Borbon, and Nelson Cruz doubled to score Andrus and Hamilton, but Kinsler popped out to end the game.

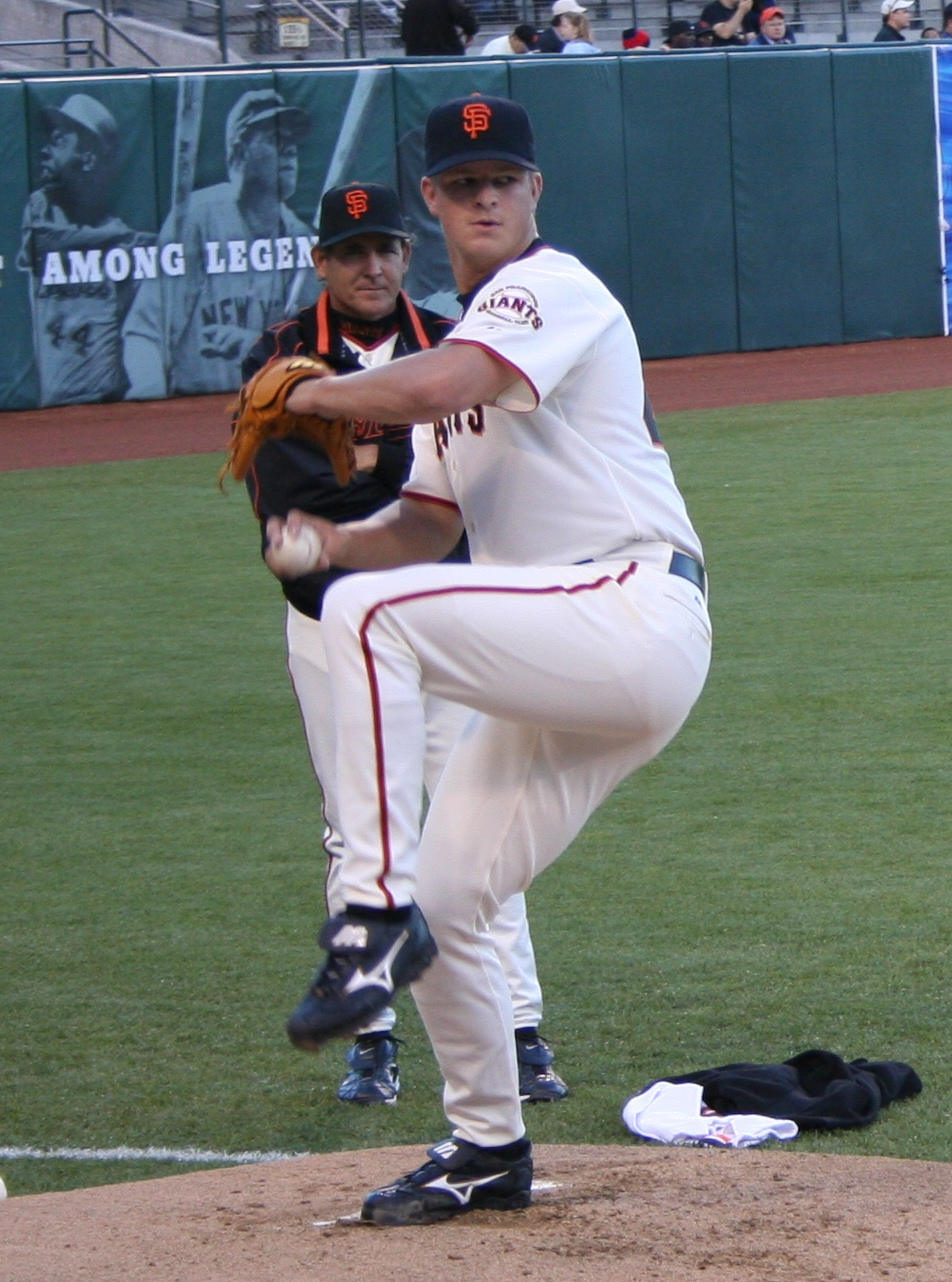
Despite four innings of well-pitched baseball between him and C. J. Wilson (below), Matt Cain (above) emerged as the winning pitcher in Game 2.

=== Game 2 ===
October 28, 2010 4:57 pm (PDT) at AT&T Park in San Francisco, California 69 °F (21 °C), mostly cloudy
Team	1	2	3	4	5	6	7	8	9	R	H	E
Texas	0	0	0	0	0	0	0	0	0	0	4	0
San Francisco	0	0	0	0	1	0	1	7	X	9	8	0
WP: Matt Cain (1–0) LP: C. J. Wilson (0–1); Home runs: TEX: None; SF: Édgar Rentería (1); Attendance: 43,622; Boxscore

Game 2 started out as a pitching duel between San Francisco's Matt Cain and Texas' C. J. Wilson. Ian Kinsler led off the top of the fifth with a deep fly ball that was perhaps an inch short of a home run. The ball bounced high off the top of the center field wall and back into the field of play, forcing Kinsler to settle for a double. Cain did not allow him to score. In the bottom of the 5th inning, Édgar Rentería hit a home run into left field to give San Francisco a 1–0 lead. Texas threatened in the top of the sixth with back-to-back singles by Michael Young and Josh Hamilton, who both advanced into scoring position on Cain's wild pitch to Nelson Cruz. Cain subsequently got Cruz and Kinsler to pop out, ending the threat. The Giants added a run in the bottom of the seventh when Cody Ross walked, advanced to second base on a groundout by Aubrey Huff, and then scored on a single by Juan Uribe. Wilson was removed from the game with a blister in the seventh inning and was relieved by Darren Oliver. Cain went 7 2/3 innings, allowing only four hits. Cain's outing was his third and final of the postseason, a playoff run in which he pitched 21 1/3 innings without allowing an earned run.

In the eighth inning, Texas reliever Darren O'Day struck out Andrés Torres and Freddy Sanchez to record the first two outs. Buster Posey singled up the middle, and O'Day was relieved by Derek Holland. Holland walked Nate Schierholtz and Cody Ross to load the bases, then walked Huff to force in a run, increasing the Giants' lead to 3–0. Mark Lowe then relieved Holland, and walked Uribe to force in another run. Rentería then singled to left field, scoring Ross and Huff to increase the Giants' lead to 6–0. Lowe was then relieved by Michael Kirkman, who gave up a triple to pinch hitter Aaron Rowand, scoring Uribe and Rentería. Rowand then scored on an Andrés Torres double. Guillermo Mota retired the Rangers in the ninth to give the Giants a 2–0 series lead. Nate Schierholtz made a running catch to end the game.

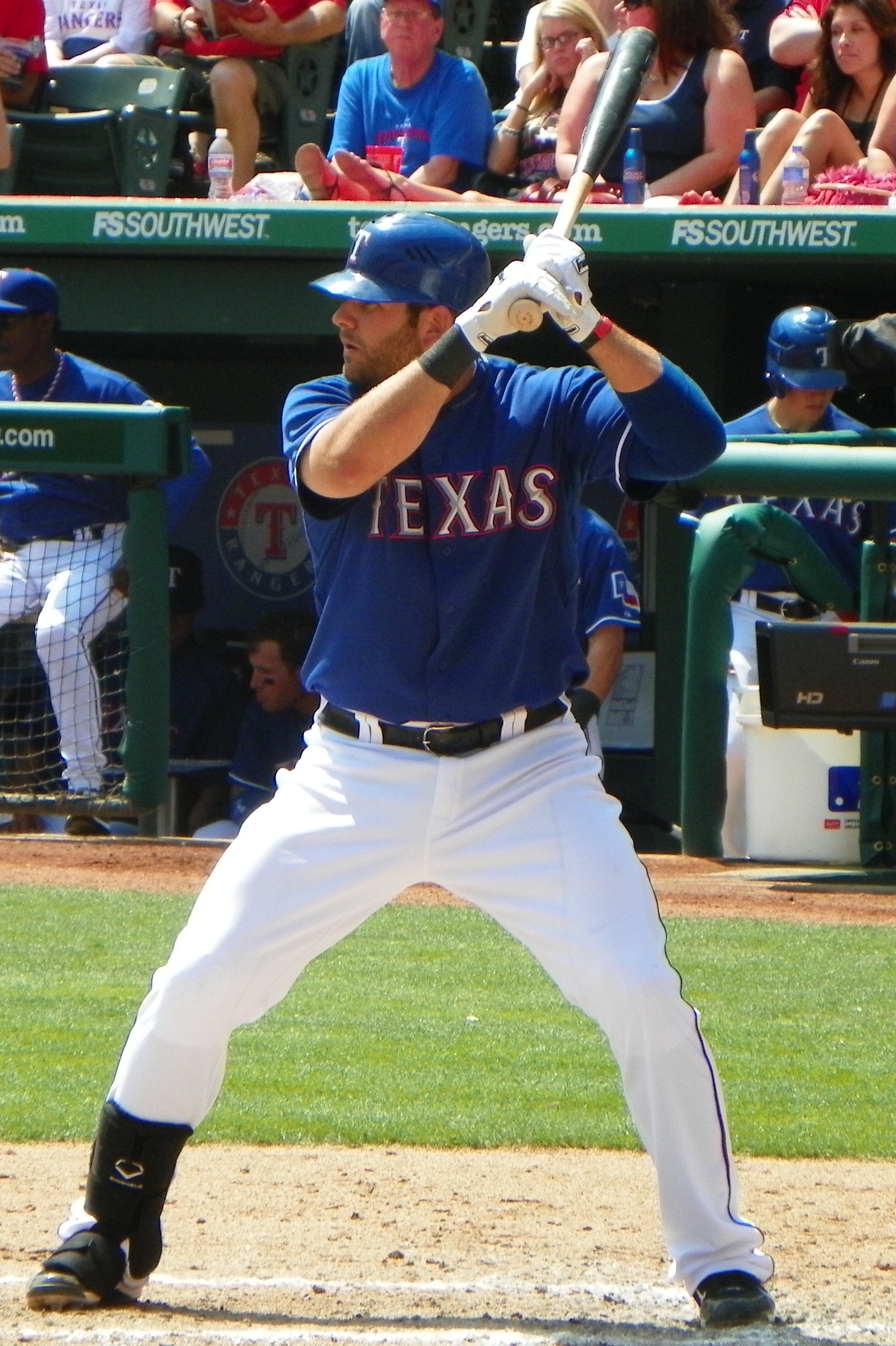
Mitch Moreland hit a three-run home run for the Rangers in Game 3.

=== Game 3 ===
October 30, 2010 6:00 pm (CDT) at Rangers Ballpark in Arlington, Texas 75 °F (24 °C), partly cloudy
Team	1	2	3	4	5	6	7	8	9	R	H	E
San Francisco	0	0	0	0	0	0	1	1	0	2	5	1
Texas	0	3	0	0	1	0	0	0	X	4	8	0
WP: Colby Lewis (1–0) LP: Jonathan Sánchez (0–1) Sv: Neftalí Feliz (1); Home runs: SF: Cody Ross (1), Andrés Torres (1); TEX: Mitch Moreland (1), Josh Hamilton (1); Attendance: 52,419; Boxscore

All runs scored in this game were produced by home runs. In the bottom of the second inning, Giants starter Jonathan Sánchez gave up a double to Nelson Cruz and walked Bengie Molina before giving up a three-run home run to Mitch Moreland. In the bottom of the fifth inning, Sánchez yielded a home run to Josh Hamilton, which would be the last batter he would face. Cody Ross and Andrés Torres cut the lead in half with home runs in the seventh and eighth, respectively, off Rangers starter Colby Lewis. Texas closer Neftalí Feliz pitched a perfect ninth to secure the Rangers' first and only victory of the series.

This was the first World Series game won by a team from Texas, as the Houston Astros were swept in 2005.

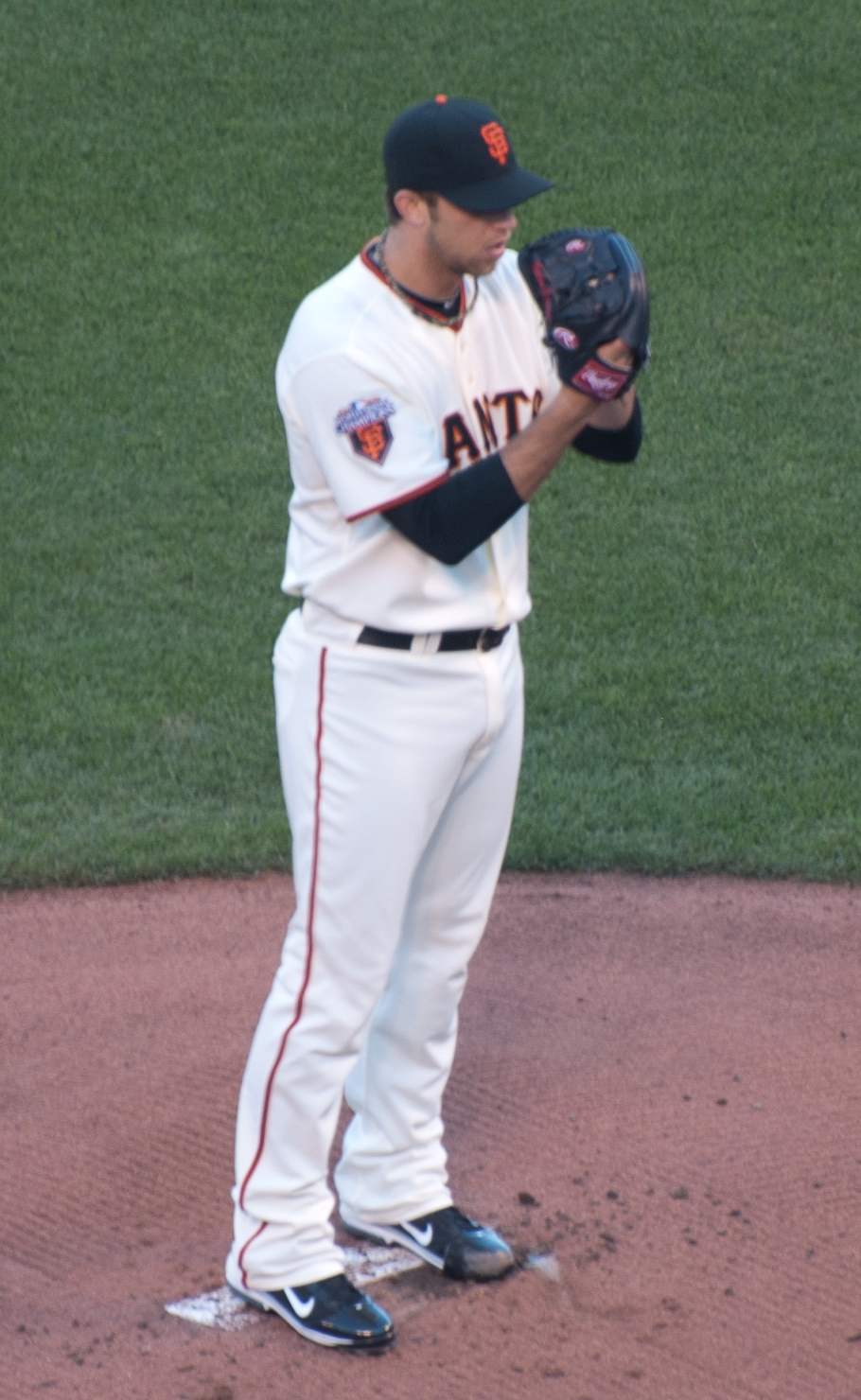
Madison Bumgarner pitched 8 shutout innings in Game 4.

=== Game 4 ===
October 31, 2010 7:22 pm (CDT) at Rangers Ballpark in Arlington, Texas 75 °F (24 °C), mostly cloudy
Team	1	2	3	4	5	6	7	8	9	R	H	E
San Francisco	0	0	2	0	0	0	1	1	0	4	8	1
Texas	0	0	0	0	0	0	0	0	0	0	3	0
WP: Madison Bumgarner (1–0) LP: Tommy Hunter (0–1); Home runs: SF: Aubrey Huff (1), Buster Posey (1); TEX: None; Attendance: 51,920; Boxscore

In Game 4, the Giants sent 21-year-old rookie Madison Bumgarner to the hill against the Rangers' Tommy Hunter. Bumgarner was brilliant for San Francisco, hurling eight innings while allowing only three hits. Bumgarner allowed only one Ranger to reach second base. A two-run homer by Aubrey Huff in the third inning off Hunter was enough for the Giants win. The other two runs were scored on a run-scoring double by Andrés Torres in the seventh and a home run to dead center by Buster Posey in the eighth. Bumgarner also became the fifth-youngest pitcher to start a World Series game, and the fourth-youngest to win one. Bumgarner and Posey were the first rookie battery to start a World Series game since Spec Shea and Yogi Berra in 1947.

=== Game 5 ===
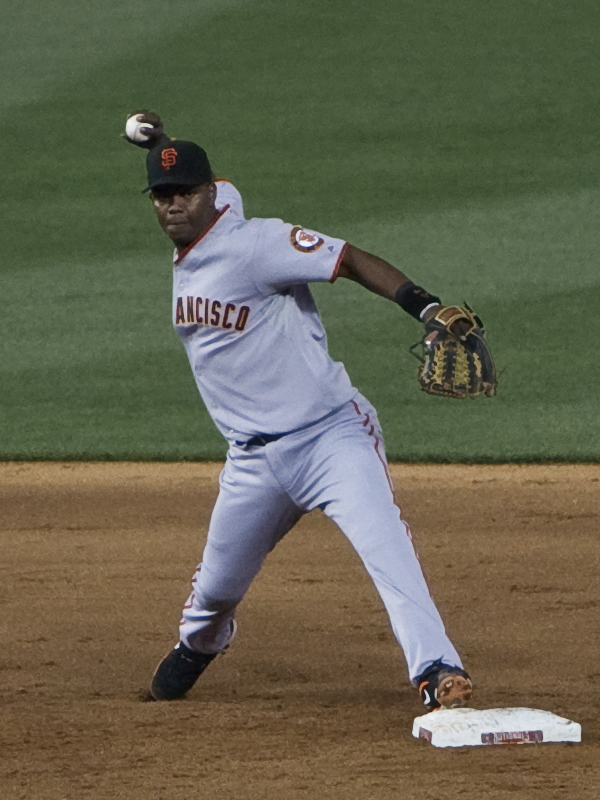
Riding the edge he gave the Giants with his seventh inning home run, Édgar Rentería was awarded the World Series Most Valuable Player award.

November 1, 2010 6:58 pm (CDT) at Rangers Ballpark in Arlington, Texas 70 °F (21 °C), mostly cloudy
Team	1	2	3	4	5	6	7	8	9	R	H	E
San Francisco	0	0	0	0	0	0	3	0	0	3	7	0
Texas	0	0	0	0	0	0	1	0	0	1	3	1
WP: Tim Lincecum (2–0) LP: Cliff Lee (0–2) Sv: Brian Wilson (1); Home runs: SF: Édgar Rentería (2); TEX: Nelson Cruz (1); Attendance: 52,045; Boxscore

Game 5 was a pitching rematch of Game 1 between former Cy Young Award winners Cliff Lee and Tim Lincecum. Down 3–1 in the series, the Rangers needed a win in their ballpark to send the Series back to San Francisco or the Giants would return home as champions. What resulted was the pitching duel anticipated in Game 1. Both Lee and Lincecum pitched six shutout innings, with Lincecum having allowed only two hits and Lee three. In the top of the seventh inning, Cody Ross and Juan Uribe singled back to back to put two runners on with no outs. The next Giant batter, Aubrey Huff, who had never laid down a bunt in his Major League career, successfully executed a sacrifice bunt, one where only a quick play by Lee prevented Huff from reaching base himself. Runners were now at second and third base for Pat Burrell. Lee struck out Burrell (10th time Burrell fanned in the Series), but then allowed a three-run homer on a 2–0 slider by Édgar Rentería to left center field, putting the Giants ahead 3–0.

With one out in the bottom of the seventh, Nelson Cruz had a home run that cut the deficit to 3–1 and broke an 18-inning scoreless streak for the Rangers—their longest drought of the entire season. Lincecum walked the next batter, Ian Kinsler, to bring the tying run to the plate in the bottom of the seventh but struck out the next two Texas batters to end the threat.

Rangers closer Neftalí Feliz pitched two scoreless innings, and Lincecum pitched a 1–2–3 eighth, keeping the score 3–1. Brian Wilson, the 2010 Major League saves champion (48 saves), relieved Lincecum in the bottom of the ninth. Facing the heart of Texas' order, Wilson made quick work of the first two batters, striking Josh Hamilton out looking on four pitches and getting Vladimir Guerrero to hit a grounder to Rentería at short on the first pitch. This brought Nelson Cruz to the plate as the last hope for Texas. Cruz worked the count to 3–2, but Wilson struck him out swinging to seal the championship for San Francisco.

Édgar Rentería's three-run homer was the second World Series championship-clinching hit of his career, the first coming with the Florida Marlins in 1997. Rentería was named the MVP of the series, as he hit .412 (7 for 17) with six RBIs in the Series.

== Composite line score ==
2010 World Series (4–1): San Francisco Giants (NL) beat Texas Rangers (AL).

Team	1	2	3	4	5	6	7	8	9	R	H	E
San Francisco Giants	0	0	4	0	7	0	6	12	0	29	42	4
Texas Rangers	1	4	0	0	1	2	1	0	3	12	29	5
Total attendance: 243,607 Average attendance: 48,721; Winning player's share: $317,631.29 Losing player's share: $246,279.55

== Broadcasting ==
=== Television ===
In the United States, Fox televised the games, with Joe Buck calling play-by-play on his 13th World Series dating back to 1996 (which was also Fox's very first World Series), while Tim McCarver handled color commentary for the 21st time since 1985 (when McCarver worked for ABC). Ken Rosenthal also appeared on the Fox telecasts as a field reporter. MLB International syndicated its own telecast of the series, with announcers Gary Thorne and Rick Sutcliffe, to various networks outside the U.S. ESPN America broadcast the series live in the UK and in Europe. Additionally, the American Forces Network and Canadian Forces Radio and Television carried the games to U.S. and Canadian service personnel stationed around the globe. Fox Deportes carried the Series in Spanish on American cable and satellite TV.

However, many viewers in the New York City and Philadelphia markets were unable to watch Games 1 and 2 because News Corporation, Fox's parent company, pulled WNYW and WTXF from cable provider Cablevision on October 16 due to a carriage dispute. An agreement between the companies was reached just before Game 3.

==== Ratings ====
The overall national Nielsen rating for the five games was 8.4, which, at the time, tied the 2008 World Series for the event's lowest-ever TV rating (the 2012 World Series would later draw a 7.6 rating to hold the record on its own). Game 4 was beaten in the ratings by a Pittsburgh Steelers–New Orleans Saints game on NBC Sunday Night Football, the first time a World Series game was outdrawn by a regular-season NFL contest airing in the same time slot.

Game	Ratings (households)	Share (households)	American audience (in millions)
1	8.9	15	15.009
2	8.5	14	14.130
3	6.7	13	11.460
4	9.0	15	15.537
5	8.8	14	14.950

=== Radio ===
ESPN Radio also broadcast the World Series nationally, with Jon Miller (who worked the Giants' local radio broadcasts during the regular season) calling his 13th consecutive World Series as the network's play-by-play announcer, and Joe Morgan providing commentary on his 11th World Series for ESPN Radio and his 14th overall (counting three Series telecasts for NBC). The games were the last that Miller and Morgan (who had also been calling Sunday Night Baseball for ESPN television since 1990) would work together, as the network subsequently announced that their contracts would not be renewed for 2011. ESPN Deportes Radio also aired the Series to Spanish language listeners, with Eduardo Ortega and former Giants pitcher Juan Marichal announcing. In the UK, the Series was broadcast by BBC Radio 5 Live Sports Extra, with Jonny Gould and Josh Chetwynd commentating.

Locally, the two teams' flagship stations broadcast the series with their respective announcing crews. The Giants' English-language broadcasts aired on KNBR (with Dave Flemming, Duane Kuiper, and Mike Krukow announcing) with their Spanish-language broadcasts on KIQI (with Erwin Higueros and Tito Fuentes), while KRLD-FM and AM carried the Rangers' English-language broadcasts (with Eric Nadel and Dave Barnett) and KFLC-AM had their Spanish-language broadcasts (with Eleno Ornelas and Jerry Romo). Due to contractual obligations, the non-flagship stations on the teams' radio networks carried the ESPN Radio broadcasts of the games, although the local broadcasts were also available on XM Satellite Radio and to Gameday Audio subscribers at MLB.com.

== Series overview and aftermath ==
San Francisco outscored Texas 29–12, and shut out the Rangers twice. The Giants became the second team in the 2010 postseason to record two shutouts in a series since the Philadelphia Phillies shut out the Cincinnati Reds twice in the NLDS. The Rangers were the first team to be shut out twice in the World Series since the Baltimore Orioles recorded three shut outs against the 1966 Los Angeles Dodgers en route to a sweep in the World Series. The Giants would later accomplish this feat again in the 2012 World Series against the Detroit Tigers.

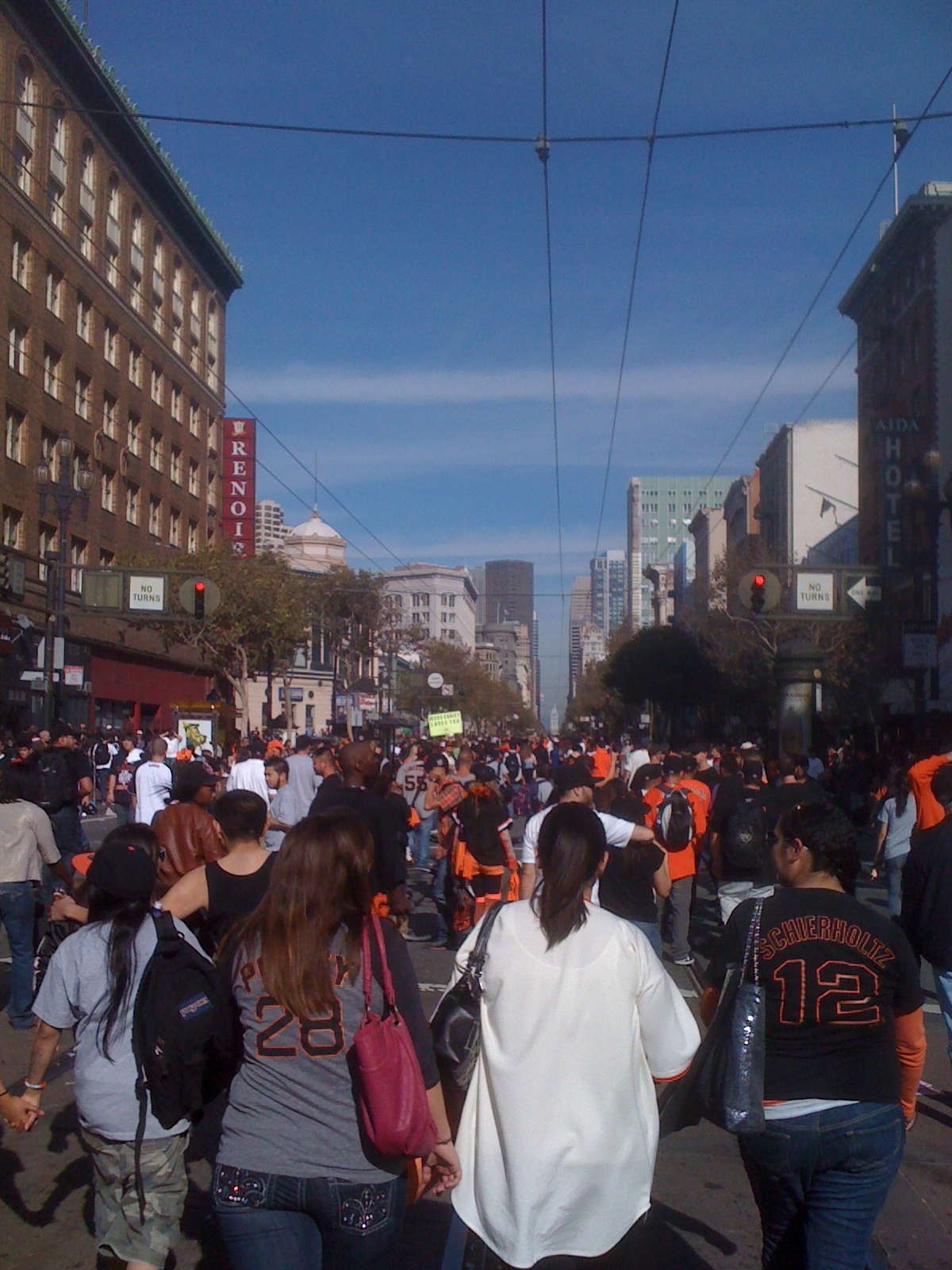
San Francisco's Market Street after the Giants victory parade

The Giants championship marked several firsts, not just for the team, but also for the city of San Francisco and the San Francisco Bay Area.

The firsts with the championship were:

- Giants:
  - Championship since 1954, when in New York.
  - Championship since moving to San Francisco.
- City of San Francisco:
  - World Series championship.
  - Major sports championship since the 49ers won Super Bowl XXIX in 1995.
- Bay Area:
  - World Series championship since the Oakland Athletics swept the Giants in 1989.
  - Major sports championship since the 49ers win in Super Bowl XXIX.

In summing up the firsts, Larry Baer, the president of the Giants and a fourth generation resident of San Francisco, said that the team dedicated the championship to "53 years of San Francisco Giants players and coaches and managers...millions of fans."

The Giants held a victory parade on November 3, following the same parade route that the team used when they moved to the city. With some estimates of a million fans lining the route, the parade and rally at City Hall was the largest event ever in the city of San Francisco. Transit agency BART set an all-time single day record for ridership, breaking its previous record by almost 20%.

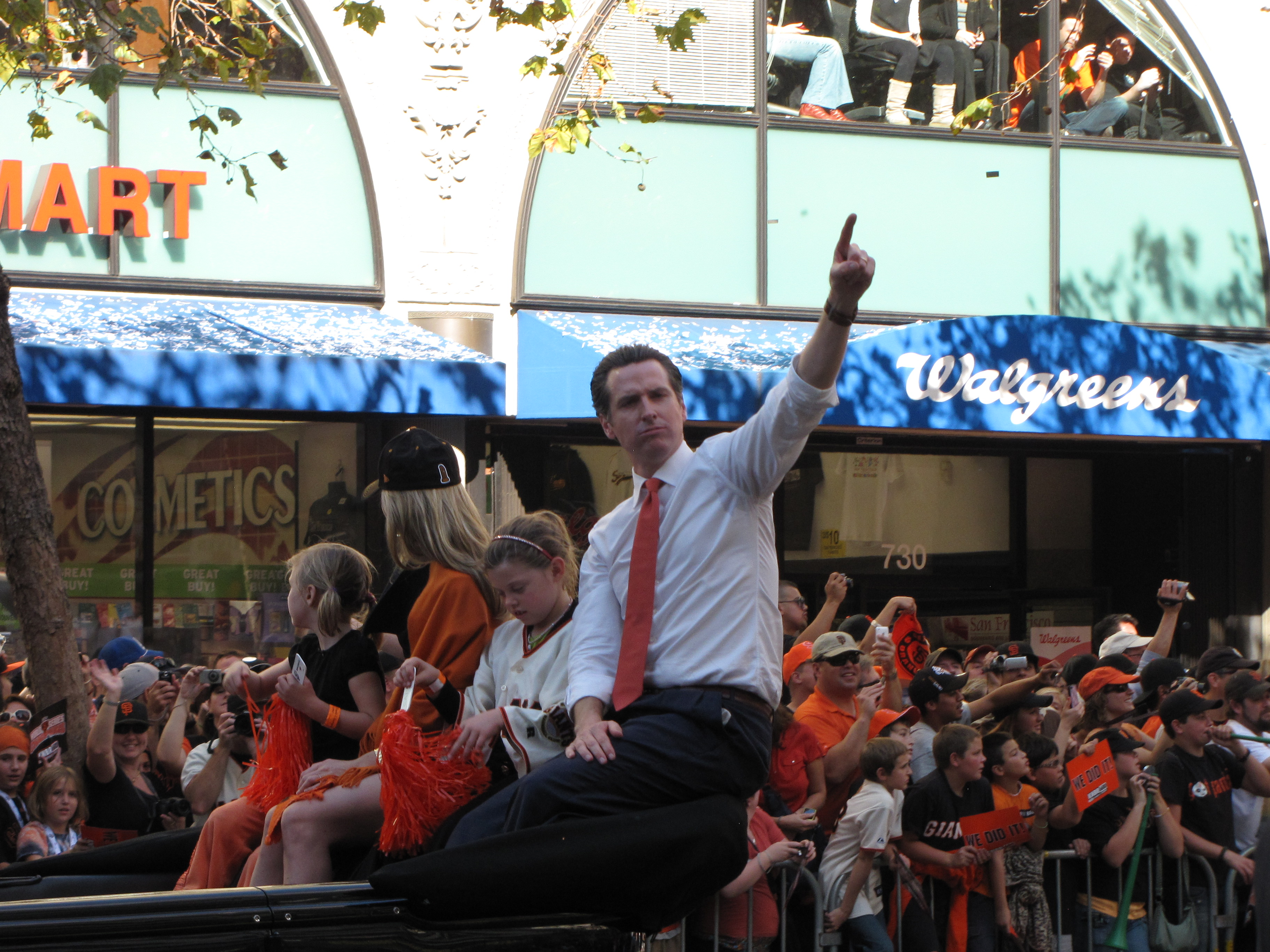
San Francisco Mayor Gavin Newsom at the victory parade with his family, 3 November 2010. He was elected as Lieutenant Governor of California the previous day.

Replaced by Buster Posey midway during the 2010 season, Bengie Molina was traded to the Rangers, reaching the World Series against the Giants. Despite being on the losing team, Molina received a championship ring, becoming just the sixth player to play for both World Series teams in the same season.

While losing Cliff Lee to free agency to Philadelphia, the Texas Rangers bolstered their line-up by signing third baseman Adrian Beltre. The next season, the Rangers won the AL West title for the second consecutive season, after leading that division for much of the season, eventually making it back to the World Series against the St. Louis Cardinals, losing to them in seven games, after being one strike away from the title, twice in Game 6.

The Giants' 2010 World Series championship was followed by two further World Series titles in 2012 and 2014; however, they missed the playoffs in between those championship seasons. Those three World Series titles in five seasons qualified as a dynasty, according to the criteria devised by statistician Bill James.

With the Giants' first World Series championship in San Francisco, the National Hockey League's San Jose Sharks remain the only Bay Area franchise without a world championship. The Sharks would reach the Stanley Cup Final for the 2015-2016 season, but ultimately lost to the Pittsburgh Penguins in six games.

Two key contributors from the San Francisco Giants would eventually join the Texas Rangers. Tim Lincecum signed a one-year contract with the Rangers on March 7, 2018. On October 21, 2022, the Rangers hired Bruce Bochy as their new manager, who led the Rangers to their first World Series championship title in his first season as Rangers manager in 2023.

== See also ==
- 2010 Asia Series
- 2010 Japan Series
- 2010 Korean Series
- Curse of Coogan's Bluff
- Curse of Bob Short
