= Curse of the Black Sox =

Chicago White Sox championship drought, 1917–2005

The Curse of the Black Sox (also known as the Curse of Shoeless Joe) (1917–2005) was a superstition or "scapegoat" cited as one reason for the failure of the Chicago White Sox to win the World Series from 1917 until 2005. As with other supposed baseball curses, such as the crosstown Chicago Cubs' Curse of the Billy Goat (1908–2016), or the Boston Red Sox' Curse of the Bambino (1918–2004), these "curses" have been publicized by the popular media over the course of time.

== The curse: 1920–1958 ==
The White Sox were dealt a severe blow in 1919 by the Black Sox scandal, when Comiskey suspended the seven alleged conspirators still on the roster late in the 1920 season (ringleader Chick Gandil only played semipro ball that year). Conventional wisdom has it that the Sox were headed for another pennant and championship and that the suspensions knocked them out of the race. In reality, the last game for the "Eight Men Out" was September 27, just three games from the end of their season. At that point the Sox had won 3 in a row and were sitting at 95–56 with 3 games to play. The Cleveland Indians were also in a hot streak, at 94–54 with 6 games to play, and halfway through a four-game sweep of the St. Louis Browns. The Indians were just a few percentage points ahead of the White Sox.

The Indians would close the season with 4 wins and 2 losses, and finish with a 98–56 record. The Sox would lose 2 of their final 3 to finish 96–58. If the Sox had swept their final series against the Browns and the Indians record stayed the same, the American League would have had its first pennant playoff. Even discounting any morale boost the Indians might have received from the news of the Sox players' suspensions, the Sox return to the World Series was by no means ensured, even if there had been no suspensions. If they had finished tied, it would be noted that the Indians had won 12 of the clubs' 22 meetings, but the Sox had taken 2 of 3 in their most recent series.

In any case, the Sox finished in second place, two games behind the Indians, who went on to win (and make some history) in the 1920 World Series. However, the New York Yankees, who finished in third place just a game behind the Sox in Babe Ruth's first year with the club, would go on to win the next three American League pennants, starting a dynasty that would be a difficult hurdle for the other AL clubs, including the White Sox, for many decades thereafter.

With the players' suspensions formalized as bans, the Sox fell to seventh place in 1921. It would be the mid-1930s before the team returned to the upper half of the league, and the early 1950s before they became regular contenders again.

== The curse: 1959–2005 ==
When the White Sox finally won their next pennant, in 1959, Jack Brickhouse called the final out of the pennant-clinching game: "A forty year wait has now ended!" At that time, four decades was the longest stretch any major league team had gone without a World Series appearance (the crosstown Cubs had only gone 14 years after winning their last pennant). In that sense, the Black Sox "curse", or the apparent pall cast over the franchise for some decades in the wake of the scandal, had also finally ended. Despite the team's pennant victory, however, they lost the 1959 World Series to the Los Angeles Dodgers in six games.

The White Sox remained competitive for the next several years, but were not quite good enough to win. After a slump, they became contenders again starting in the late 1970s, and qualified for post-season play by winning the American League West division title in 1983 and 1993 and the American League Central division title in 2000. The "curse" discussion was revived by the national media during the 2005 post-season, when the Sox won their first league championship since 1959 (an even longer wait than before, 46 years). During the ensuing 2005 World Series, the White Sox swept the Houston Astros for their first World Series championship in 88 years (87 if the cancelled 1994 World Series is excluded). Some of this discussion found its way to the official World Series film DVD. For example, White Sox center fielder Aaron Rowand, in an interview for the DVD, compared the 2004 Red Sox with the 2005 White Sox: "If they could break their 'curse', so could we."

In one of the ways that patterns appear to emerge in sporting events, the White Sox World Series win in 2005, along with the Boston Red Sox win in 2004, symmetrically bookended the two teams' previous wins in the World Series and the long gaps between them, with the Red Sox's and White Sox's last World Series wins having come in 1918 and 1917, respectively.

== Skeptics ==
There is a large faction of White Sox fans who dismiss the idea of a curse against the White Sox as a ridiculous (yet successful) ploy by the national media to sensationalize the team in efforts for increased ratings, instead attributing their drought to the more obvious reason: team mismanagement. The Comiskeys were very conservative spenders (which many hypothesize to be the reason that the Black Sox scandal even occurred in the first place) and it was not until 1958 that the family gave up majority ownership to Bill Veeck, who was an innovative marketer but lacked sufficient resources to compete with wealthier teams. Ownership then passed to the Allyn brothers, who almost moved the team to Milwaukee while mediocre on-field performance continued. The team was then reacquired by Veeck, who sold it to current majority owner Jerry Reinsdorf, who also owns the NBA's Chicago Bulls on the West Side of town.

== See also ==
- Baseball superstition
- Black Sox scandal
- Curse of the Bambino – A similar superstition surrounding the Boston Red Sox (ended in 2004)
- Curse of the Billy Goat – A similar superstition surrounding the Chicago Cubs (ended in 2016)
- Curse of Rocky Colavito – A similar superstition surrounding the Cleveland Guardians (ongoing)
- Curse of the Colonel – A similar superstition surrounding the Hanshin Tigers (Japanese baseball, ended in 2023)
- Curse of Coogan's Bluff – A similar superstition surrounding the San Francisco Giants (ended in 2010)
- Curse of Billy Penn - A similar superstition surrounding sports in Philadelphia (ended 2008)
- Sports-related curses
