= Baseball superstition =

Collection of superstitious beliefs regarding baseball

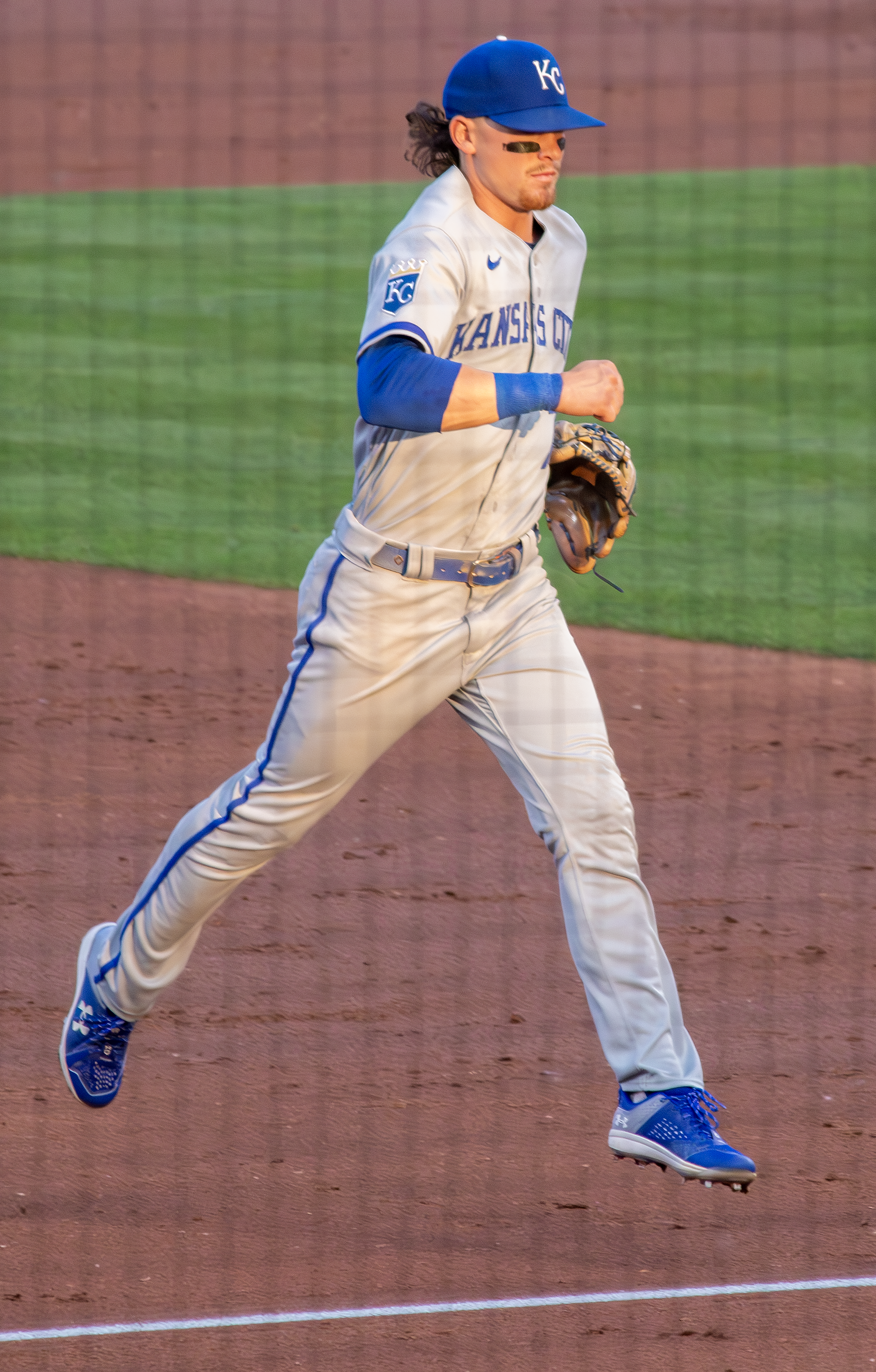
Bobby Witt Jr. jumps over the line, 2023.

Baseball is a sport with a long history of superstition. From the Curse of the Bambino to some players' refusal to wash their clothes or bodies after a win, superstition is present in all parts of baseball. Many baseball players — batters, pitchers, and fielders alike — perform elaborate, repetitive routines prior to pitches and at bats due to superstition. The desire to keep a number they have been successful with is strong in baseball. In fact, anything that happens prior to something good or bad in baseball can give birth to a new superstition.

Some of the more common superstitions include purposely stepping on or avoiding stepping on the foul line when taking the field, and not talking about a no-hitter or perfect game while it is in progress — a superstition that also holds for fans and announcers. Others include routines such as eating only chicken before a game like Wade Boggs, pitcher Justin Verlander eating three crunchy taco supremes (no tomato), a cheesy gordita crunch and a Mexican Pizza (no tomato) from Taco Bell, before every start, and drawing in the dirt in the batter's box before an at bat. Justin Morneau, the 2006 American League Most Valuable Player winner, wears number 33 to honour his idol, ex-NHL goaltender Patrick Roy. His ritual before every Twins' home game entails stopping by the same Jimmy John's Gourmet Subs — located on Grand Avenue in St. Paul, Minnesota — and ordering the same sandwich from the menu: Turkey Tom with no sprouts. Afterwards, he drinks a Slurpee from a Slurpee machine in the Twins' clubhouse made of one-half Mountain Dew, one-half red or orange flavor. In 2013, Bryce Harper said on Jimmy Kimmel Live that he eats waffles and takes seven showers before games.

Certain players go as far as observing superstitions off the field. This includes early 20th-century second baseman Amby McConnell; whenever he was in the middle of a batting slump, he would scavenge the streets and pick up any pin he found, believing this was a sign he would break out of the slump.

== See also ==
- Curse of the Bambino
- Curse of the Billy Goat
- Curse of Billy Penn
- Curse of the Black Sox
- Curse of Rocky Colavito
- Curse of the Colonel
- Curse of Coogan's Bluff
- Ex-Cubs Factor
- Koufax Curse
- Milwaukee Brewers reverse World Series curse
- Sailors' superstitions
- Sports-related curses
