= Freddy Sanchez =

American baseball player (born 1977)

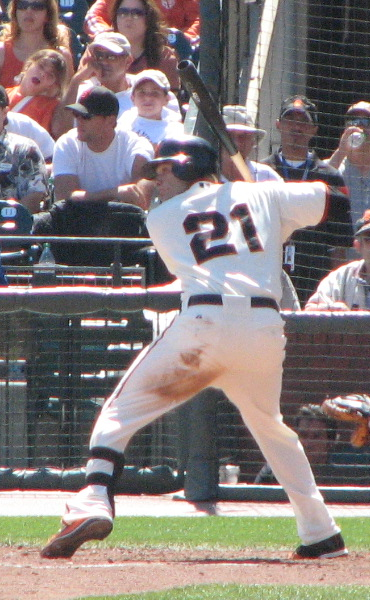
- Sanchez with the Giants in 2010
- Second baseman
- Born: December 21, 1977 (age 48); Hollywood, California, U.S.
- Batted: Right Threw: Right

MLB debut
- September 10, 2002, for the Boston Red Sox

Last MLB appearance
- June 10, 2011, for the San Francisco Giants

MLB statistics
- Batting average: .297
- Home runs: 48
- Runs batted in: 371
- Stats at Baseball Reference

Teams
- Boston Red Sox (2002–2003); Pittsburgh Pirates (2004–2009); San Francisco Giants (2009–2011)

Career highlights and awards
- 3× All-Star (2006, 2007, 2009); World Series champion (2010); NL batting champion (2006)

Frederick Phillip Sanchez Jr. (born December 21, 1977) is an American former professional baseball second baseman. Sanchez played in Major League Baseball for the Boston Red Sox (2002–2003), Pittsburgh Pirates (2004–2009) and San Francisco Giants (2009–2011). He batted and threw right-handed.

Born with a severely pigeon-toed left foot and a club right foot, Sanchez defied doctors' expectations by learning how to walk normally. He was named the Most Valuable Player of the Foothill League his senior year at Burbank High School, getting drafted by the Atlanta Braves in the 30th round of the 1996 Major League Baseball (MLB) draft. However, Sanchez chose to attend college instead, spending two years at Glendale Community College, one year at Dallas Baptist University, and one year at Oklahoma City University, where he was a National Association of Intercollegiate Athletics All-American short stop. Following his college career, he was drafted by the Red Sox in the 11th round of the 2000 draft.

Sanchez made his major league debut with the Red Sox in 2002, playing 12 games that season, and then played 20 games with them in 2003 before getting traded to the Pirates. He suffered an injury in his first game with the Pirates' Triple-A affiliate and missed the remainder of the 2003 season, as well as the first half of 2004. Sanchez spent most of 2004 in the minor leagues, only playing nine games for Pittsburgh. In his first full season, he received many of the starts at third base and second base for the Pirates, batting .291. Still, he was just a reserve player to begin the 2006 season, but that would be the best year of his career. Given a chance to start at third base when Joe Randa was injured in May, Sanchez had 200 hits and led the National League (NL) with a .344 batting average, the highest by a Pirate since Roberto Clemente batted .345 in 1969. He made the All-Star Game that year as well as 2007, when he batted .304. After hitting .271 in 2008, Sanchez reached his third All-Star Game with the Pirates in 2009 but was traded to the Giants on July 31.

Expected to help the Giants contend for the playoffs in the latter part of 2009, Sanchez spent much of his time with them injured. He missed the start of the 2010 season with a shoulder injury but became a key part of their infield as their starting second baseman after making his season debut on May 19. He batted .292 as San Francisco won the NL West. In Game 3 of the 2010 National League Division Series against Atlanta, he hit a two-out single against Craig Kimbrel in the ninth inning of a game the Giants trailed 2–1; they rallied to win 3–2 that inning. Sanchez batted .320 in the 2010 National League Championship Series against the Philadelphia Phillies, then became the first player to have doubles in his first three World Series at bats in Game 1 of the 2010 World Series, helping the Giants win their first World Series since 1954 as they defeated the Texas Rangers. Sanchez batted .289 through 60 games in 2011 but suffered another shoulder injury on June 10. He spent the next season and a half on the disabled list, then announced his retirement on December 21, 2015.

== Early life ==
Frederick Phillip Sanchez Jr. was born to Freddy Sr. and Michelle at Hollywood Presbyterian Medical Center on December 21, 1977. At birth, he had a severely pigeon-toed left foot and a club right foot, and his parents received an initial medical prognosis that he might never walk. After they sought specialized medical attention through the Children's Orthopaedic Center at Children's Hospital Los Angeles, they had him undergo surgery to correct his foot problems at 13 months. Sanchez then had to undergo years of physical therapy before he could walk properly. His father was a truck driver who got his son interested in baseball by playing catch with him in the backyard. Sanchez and his father were big fans of the Los Angeles Dodgers. After a full day of work, Freddy Sr. would come home, then drive his son 30–45 minutes to play Little League baseball, as there were few fields near where the Sanchez family lived in downtown Los Angeles. During Sanchez's sixth grade year, the family moved to Burbank.

In 1996, Sanchez graduated from Burbank High School, where he was a three-year varsity player. In his senior year he was named the Most Valuable Player (MVP) of the Foothill League of the California Interscholastic Federation. While in high school, he played on a summer league team with Jack Wilson, who would eventually be his teammate in the major leagues with the Pittsburgh Pirates. His senior year, he was the No. 3 prospect in his region. He was drafted by the Atlanta Braves in the 30th round of the 1996 Major League Baseball (MLB) draft out of Burbank High but opted to attend college instead. "They told me they were going to do a draft-and-watch," Sanchez said of the Braves, "So I didn't even have the choice of being signed."

Initially, Sanchez planned to attend Los Angeles Valley College, the closest community college to where he lived. However, he went to Glendale Community College instead after they hired Denny Barrett as their coach; Sanchez had played under Barrett on a travel team and looked forward to being on his team again. In two years at Glendale, he batted .407, won the Western State Conference MVP Award, and led the team to a co-championship in the conference. He transferred to Dallas Baptist University of the National Association of Intercollegiate Athletics (NAIA) as a junior, where he played in the NAIA World Series. Dallas Baptist switched coaches after Sanchez's junior year, prompting him to transfer to Oklahoma City University (OCU) for his senior year in 2000. Sanchez batted .434 with 13 home runs and 59 runs batted in (RBI) for the OCU Stars, getting named a NAIA All-American. The Stars advanced all the way to the Sooner Athletic Conference championship game, which they lost to Oklahoma Baptist University. Sanchez credits OCU coaches Denney Crabaugh and Keith Lytle with his eventual success in the major leagues; Lytle taught him to hit to all fields, as opposed to just being a pull hitter. After being recommended to the Boston Red Sox by scout Ernie Jacobs, Sanchez was chosen by Boston in the 11th round of the 2000 draft, signing with the team nine days later.

== Career ==
=== Boston Red Sox: Major league debut ===
In the 2000 season, Sanchez split the year between the Single-A short season Lowell Spinners and the Single-A Augusta GreenJackets. For Lowell he hit .288, and for Augusta he hit .301. He began 2001 playing for the Single-A advanced Sarasota Red Sox, where he batted .339 in 69 games. Promoted to the Double-A Trenton Thunder that season, he hit .326 in 44 games.

Sanchez split the majority of the 2002 season between Trenton and the Triple-A Pawtucket Red Sox. With Trenton, he batted .328 in 80 games, reaching the Eastern League All-Star Game before earning a promotion to Pawtucket on July 16. To this point, he had mostly been used as a shortstop, but the Red Sox started having him play second base at Pawtucket as well because Nomar Garciaparra was firmly entrenched as Boston's shortstop in the major leagues. With Pawtucket, Sanchez batted .301 in 45 games. A September call-up by Boston, Sanchez made his major league debut for the Red Sox on September 10 against the Tampa Bay Devil Rays, when he pinch-hit for Rey Sánchez with the bases loaded. He had a two-RBI single against Steven Kent as the Red Sox won 12–1. Sanchez played 12 games for the Red Sox that September, batting .188 with three runs scored, three hits, and three RBI in 16 at bats.

In 2003, Sanchez started the year with Pawtucket. He led the International League in batting with a .384 average before getting promoted by Boston on May 30. With Boston, his average was just .235 in 20 games. Demoted to Pawtucket at the end of July, he batted .208 before July 31, the 2003 trade deadline. On that day, Sanchez was dealt (along with left-handed pitcher Mike Gonzalez) to the Pittsburgh Pirates in return for pitchers Jeff Suppan, Brandon Lyon and Anastacio Martínez.

=== Pittsburgh Pirates: Batting title, All-Star ===
==== 2003–04 ====
Upon acquiring Sanchez, the Pirates assigned him to the Triple-A Nashville Sounds; he played only one game there before an ankle injury forced him onto the disabled list. Following the season, Sanchez had surgery to remove a bone spur from his right foot. Hoping to be ready for 2004 spring training, he ultimately spent the first half of the 2004 season on the disabled list, not playing for Nashville until July. Though his .264 average (in 44 games) was his lowest at any minor league level, he joined the Pirates as a September callup. In nine games, he batted .158, with three hits and two runs scored.

==== 2005 ====
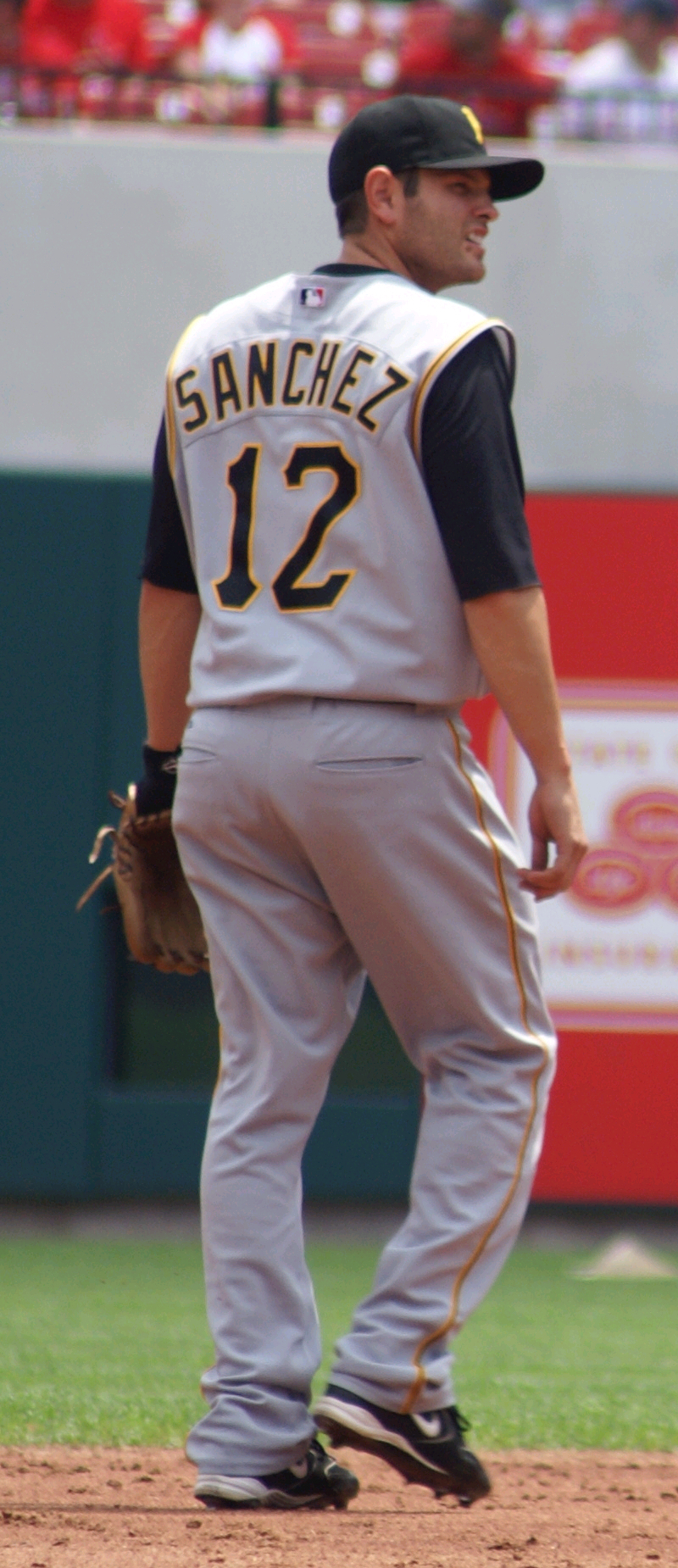
Sanchez in 2007

2005 was Sanchez's first full season in the major leagues. He began the season as a backup infielder, filling in for other players at second base, shortstop, and third base. On May 28, he took over as the starting third baseman from Ty Wigginton, who was batting .196. He got a majority of the starts at third base until August 22, when he was moved to second base after José Castillo suffered a season-ending injury to his medial collateral ligament. On July 3, he had three hits and two RBI, including his first home run (a solo shot in the seventh inning against Doug Davis) in an 11–10 victory over the Milwaukee Brewers. He finished the season on a 17-game hitting streak, getting 11 hits in a four-day span from September 19 through September 22. He appeared in 132 games and made 100 starts (39 at second base, 6 at shortstop and 55 at third base), compiling a .291 batting average with five home runs and 35 RBI.

==== 2006 ====
Sanchez began the 2006 season as a bench player, valuable to the Pirates for his ability to play multiple positions. When third baseman Joe Randa went on the disabled list with a foot injury at the beginning of May, Sanchez took over the position, becoming a starter for the rest of the year. On June 29, he had four hits, including a walk-off home run against Cliff Politte as Pittsburgh snapped a 13-game losing streak, defeating the Chicago White Sox 7–6. Three hits the day before gave him seven in a two-day span, and the 29th was the last day of a 13-game hitting streak for Sanchez.

Not on the 2006 All-Star ballot because he was a bench player to start the season, Sanchez still received over 850,000 write-in votes for the All-Star Game, an MLB record. He finished fifth in the voting to David Wright, who was the National League (NL) starter at third base, but Sanchez still made the NL All-Star squad as a reserve selected by NL manager Phil Garner. In pregame introductions, Sanchez and teammate Jason Bay received an ovation from the fans, as the game was played at their home stadium, PNC Park. Sanchez entered the game in the fifth inning at shortstop, replacing Édgar Rentería. He made a stellar leaping catch in the fifth inning to rob Mark Loretta of a hit, then also darted far to the right of second base in the eighth inning to complete a putout of Grady Sizemore. Sanchez finished the game at second base and went 0 for 2 at the plate with two groundouts. On August 31, he had four RBI, including an 11th-inning RBI against Ryan Dempster that capped Pittsburgh's three-run comeback in a 10–9 victory over the Cubs. Sanchez was the final out on September 24 when Trevor Hoffman of the San Diego Padres set what was at the time the major league record for saves with his 479th.

The 2006 season was the best of Sanchez's career. He won the NL batting title with a .344 average, beating Florida Marlins third baseman Miguel Cabrera on the last day of the season and becoming the first Pirate to win a batting title since Bill Madlock in 1983. The .344 average was the highest by a Pirate since Roberto Clemente batted .345 in 1969. Paul Meyer of the Pittsburgh Post-Gazette dubbed 2006 Sanchez's "storybook season" for his rise from a high-ceiling, limited-visibility prospect to an All-Star and batting champion. Pirates' manager Jim Tracy admitted his surprise and praised him: "If you handed out ballots at the start of the season listing potential candidates to win the National League batting championship, I don't know that his name would have been on it. Now? He's a guy people are going to keep an eye on for many years to come." In addition to leading the league in hitting, Sanchez recorded 200 hits in 2006, leading the NL in doubles with 53 and setting a career-high with 85 RBI. After the season, Sanchez received the Tony Conigliaro Award, an annual award to a player who overcomes obstacles and adversity to succeed, in recognition of his having led the NL in hitting even though doctors once wondered if he would ever walk.

==== 2007 ====
In 2007, Sanchez was moved to second base, replacing Castillo so that José Bautista could be the Pirates third baseman. A knee injury caused him to miss much of spring training and the beginning of the regular season, as Sanchez did not make his first appearance until the sixth game of the season. For the second year in a row, Sanchez was named to the NL All-Star team as a reserve, selected by Tony La Russa. This time, he was the only Pirate All-Star. On August 11, he had four hits and five RBI, including a home run against Tim Lincecum in a 13–3 victory over the San Francisco Giants. Against the Colorado Rockies on August 22, he had his fourth four-hit game of the season and hit a home run against Ramón Ortiz as the Pirates won 11–2. He had five RBI in the first game of a doubleheader on August 28, including a grand slam against Elizardo Ramírez as the Pirates defeated the Cincinnati Reds by a score of 6–4. Sanchez also missed Pittsburgh's final five games of the year, undergoing surgery to repair a separated shoulder, an injury he had played through for much of the season. He finished the season with a .304 batting average and a career-high 11 home runs.

==== 2008 ====
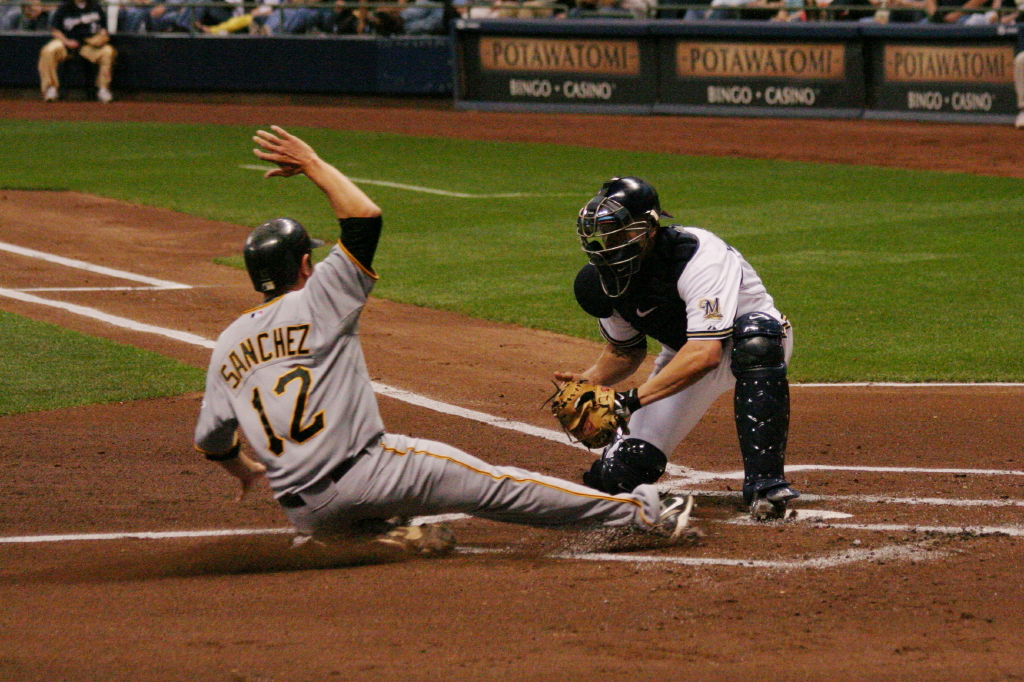
Sanchez sliding into home against Jason Kendall of the Milwaukee Brewers

On February 5, the Pirates and Sanchez agreed to a two-year deal, with an option for 2010. The contract paid Sanchez $11 million guaranteed but had the potential to be as high as $18.4 million. On May 4, he had three hits and scored two runs in a 5–4 victory over the Giants. Batting .230 entering the Pirates' game on July 21, Sanchez hoped for improved performance in the remainder of the year. On July 21, he hit a three-run inside-the-park home run against Tim Byrdak as the Pirates defeated the Houston Astros 9–3. The next day, he had three hits and two RBI, including a solo home run against Jack Cassel as the Pirates defeated the Astros 8–2. On September 6, he had a season-high four hits, two runs scored, and two RBI, but the effort came in a 7–6 loss to the Giants. By batting .347 in his final 54 games (starting July 21), Sanchez raised his season average to .271 by the end of the year. He also hit nine home runs and had 52 RBI in 2008.

==== 2009 ====
Almost rested for a game on May 25, 2009, Sanchez had six hits as the Pirates defeated the Cubs 10–8, the first six-hit game by a Pirate since Wally Backman had one in 1990. He had two hits on June 13, including a grand slam against Nate Robertson as the Pirates defeated the Detroit Tigers by a score of 9–3. Eight days later, he had a home run and three RBI, but the Pirates lost 5–4 to Colorado.

Selected to the All-Star Game amidst trade rumors, Sanchez was one of two NL position players not to be used in the game (along with Hunter Pence) but became the first Pittsburgh infielder to be selected to the game three times since Bill Mazeroski. On July 16, reports broke that the Pirates had discussed long term contracts with Sanchez and Jack Wilson. Both players rejected Pittsburgh's initial offers, causing Pirates' general manager Neal Huntington to question their willingness to remain with the club. On July 29, 2009, Sanchez was traded to the San Francisco Giants for minor league pitcher Tim Alderson. In 86 games with Pittsburgh, Sanchez batted .296 with 6 home runs and 34 RBI.

=== San Francisco Giants: World Series champion ===
==== 2009 ====
On August 26, Sanchez was placed on the 15-day disabled list (retroactive to August 18) due to a strained left shoulder. "It's just one of those deals, I apologize to the fans and to the organization and my teammates and everybody," Sanchez said, as the Giants were hoping he would help them contend for the playoffs. "I got traded here for a reason and that was to play. For me not to be out there hurts." He was activated off the disabled list in September and returned to the lineup September 17, but he played only 12 more games before twisting his left knee on September 21 and missing the last 12 games of the season with the injury. The Giants were eliminated from the NL Wild Card race on September 30, missing the playoffs. In 25 games with San Francisco, Sanchez batted .284 with one home run and seven RBI. His combined totals between the ball clubs included a .293 average, seven home runs, and 41 RBI in 111 games.

On October 30, Sanchez signed a two-year, $12 million contract to remain with the Giants. He had surgery on his left knee after the 2009 season, as well as arthroscopic surgery on his left shoulder.

==== 2010: World Series champion ====
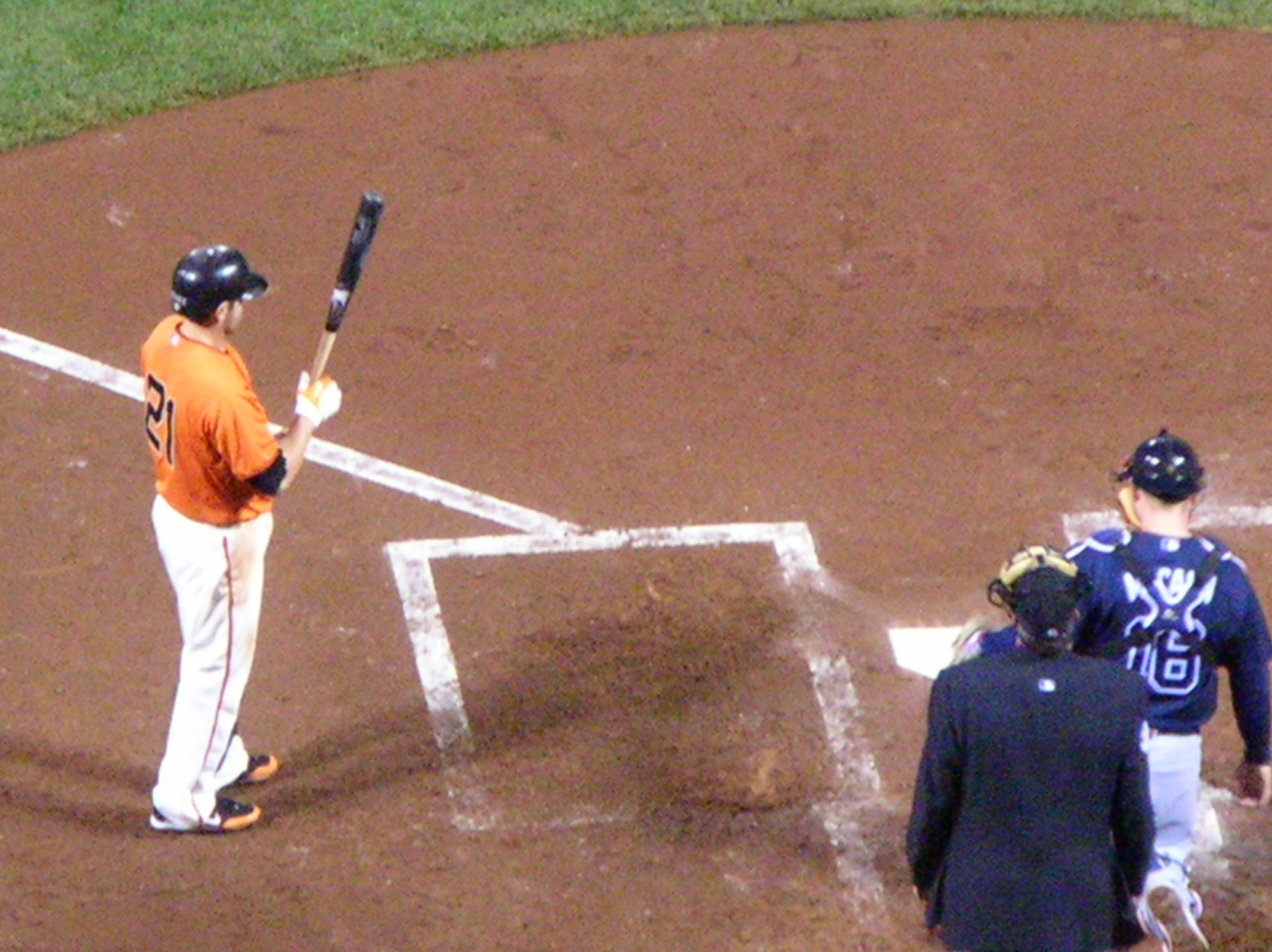
Sanchez bats during Game 2 of the National League Division Series

Sanchez was a key member of the Giants' infield in 2010. Because of his shoulder surgery, his season debut was postponed to May 19, but he served as the Giants' everyday second baseman for the rest of the year. On June 20, he hit a three-run home run against Brian Tallet in a 9–6 victory over the Toronto Blue Jays. On August 23 and 24, he had back-to-back four hit games in victories over the Reds. He also had four hits on September 23 in a 13–0 victory over the Chicago Cubs. Three days later, he hit a two-run home run against Jorge de la Rosa as the Giants defeated the Rockies by a score of 4–2. Sanchez finished the season batting .292 with seven home runs and 47 RBI as the San Francisco Giants won the NL West, reaching the playoffs for the team's first time since 2003 and Sanchez's first time ever.

In the 2010 National League Division Series against the Braves, Sanchez batted .125 but scored two runs. In Game 3, Sanchez batted in the ninth inning with two outs and the Giants down 2–1. Craig Kimbrel got two strikes on him, but Sanchez hit a single, then later scored the tying run as the Giants came back to win the game 3–2 that inning. The Giants defeated Atlanta in four games. He batted .320 in the 2010 National League Championship Series against the Philadelphia Phillies, with three multi-hit games as the Giants beat the Phillies in six games. In Game 1 of the 2010 World Series against the Texas Rangers, he became the first player in history to collect three doubles in his first three World Series at-bats during the Giants' 11–7 victory over the Rangers. "I think it’s crazy to have my name up there with all the guys that have played in the World Series that have done that before," he said. "Obviously for no one to have done that yet, I think it’s something special. For just a little guy like me to go out there and be able to do it. But getting the win was the most important thing, but that’s something special and something I can enjoy along with the win." Sanchez had four hits total in that game, and he had two more in the Series. In Game 4, he made a leaping catch of a line drive off the bat of Jeff Francoeur with two outs in the second inning, falling on his back but hanging onto the ball. The Giants won that game 4–0, then won the series in five games, earning their first World Series title since 1954.

Bothered by his left shoulder late in the year, Sanchez had a second surgery on it following the 2010 season. Dave Groeschner, the Giants' trainer, explained that the surgery severed Sanchez's biceps tendon, cleaning up the back of the second baseman's shoulder.

==== 2011 ====
On April 1, the Giants extended Sanchez's contract an additional year for $6 million in 2012. The next day, he had three hits, three RBI, and a home run against Lance Cormier in a 10–0 victory over the Dodgers. With the Giants trailing the Diamondbacks 3–2 in the sixth inning on April 16, Sanchez had an RBI double to drive in the tying run, then had a two-RBI single in the seventh to put the Giants ahead as they won 5–3. Sanchez hit a home run against Maikel Cleto on June 2, driving in four runs total as the Giants beat the St. Louis Cardinals 12–7. On June 10, Sanchez dislocated his shoulder diving for a ground ball by Reds second baseman Brandon Phillips. He was placed on the disabled list, and on August 1, it was announced that Sanchez would have season-ending surgery the next day. Sanchez batted .289 with three home runs and 24 RBI in 60 games in what would be his final major league season.

==== 2012, retirement ====
Sanchez started the year on the disabled list. He attempted to return to the Giants, playing three games for the Single-A Advanced San Jose Giants on a rehab assignment. However, on July 4, Sanchez underwent back surgery which kept him out for the rest of the season. Unsigned after the 2012 season, Sanchez considered a comeback attempt. Finally, he officially retired on December 21, 2015, his 38th birthday.

=== Career statistics ===
Years	Games	PA	AB	R	H	2B	3B	HR	RBI	BB	SO	AVG	OBP	SLG	FLD%
10	904	3686	3402	434	1012	215	17	48	371	180	420	.297	.335	.413	.988

Sanchez played 646 games at second base, 172 games at third base and 55 games at shortstop.

== Personal life ==
Sanchez married his high school sweetheart, Alissa Dowdy, in 2002. An actress, she had made appearances in The Nanny and The Fresh Prince of Bel-Air. They have two sons, born 2005 and 2008. During his playing career, he used a webcam to keep in touch with his children while on road trips.

Sanchez has been good friends with Jack Wilson since the two played together in a travel league. When Sanchez was called up by Pittsburgh in September 2004, Wilson let him and his wife stay at his house. Sanchez said Wilson "is like a brother to me." Since his retirement, he and his family have resided in Chandler, Arizona.

Burbank High School, Glendale Community College, and Oklahoma City University have all inducted Sanchez into their Halls of Fame. Additionally, Burbank High School retired Sanchez's number 21.

== See also ==
- List of Major League Baseball batting champions
- List of Major League Baseball annual doubles leaders
- List of Major League Baseball single-game hits leaders
