= Curse of Coogan's Bluff =

San Francisco Giants championship drought, 1958–2010

The Curse of Coogan's Bluff (also known as the Curse of Eddie Grant) (1958–2010) was a baseball-related superstition that allegedly prevented the San Francisco Giants Major League Baseball franchise from winning the World Series following the club's move from New York City to San Francisco after the conclusion of the 1957 season. The curse began when upset Giants fans in the New York metropolitan area placed a hex on the relocated franchise. The curse proved true in the World Series of 1962, 1989, and 2002. It ended when the Giants won the 2010 World Series in their fourth World Series appearance since the move to San Francisco.

== Background and origin of the curse ==
Although the actual curse began in 1958, the story goes back to 1918 when Eddie Grant was killed while fighting in World War I. The team honored him with a commemorative plaque on the center field wall at the Polo Grounds (which was located on a piece of land in New York called "Coogan's Bluff," so named for its owner/developer, James J. Coogan). While the franchise was based in New York, the Giants won five World Series titles, with the longest drought between titles being 21 years. The last championship as the New York Giants came against the Cleveland Indians in 1954, notably featuring Willie Mays' famous catch in Game 1.

In the 1950s, Giants' owner Horace Stoneham began to consider moving the team to another city while needing a new stadium to replace the crumbling Polo Grounds. San Francisco mayor George Christopher negotiated with Stoneham, approving the move to San Francisco starting with the 1958 season. The approval caused the upset Giants fans to storm the field during the last home game before the relocation, stealing the Eddie Grant plaque and losing the team identity. Following the move, upset Giants' fans in New York allegedly placed a hex on the San Francisco Giants, claiming the franchise would never win the World Series while based in San Francisco. Many believed all of the team's good luck is in New York.

== World Series appearances during the curse ==
During the 50 years after placing the alleged Curse of Coogan's Bluff, the Giants made three World Series appearances and lost each time, twice in a deciding Game 7. In 1962, the Giants tied for first place in the National League, then won a three-game playoff against the rival Los Angeles Dodgers with a dramatic comeback in the 9th inning of the third game to win the National League pennant. But in Game 7 of the 1962 World Series, against their former crosstown rival New York Yankees, down 1–0 and with runners on second and third, Willie McCovey hit a sharp line drive, and the ball was caught by Yankees' second baseman Bobby Richardson to end the game and the Series.

In the 1989 World Series, the Giants were swept by another San Francisco Bay Area team, the Oakland Athletics. The 1989 Series was infamous for the large earthquake that struck the San Francisco Bay Area, delaying Games 3 and 4 of the World Series by 10 days. In the 2002 World Series against the Anaheim Angels, the Giants led the series 3–2 heading back to Anaheim for Games 6 and 7, but the Giants lost the last two games for their third World Series loss since moving to San Francisco. In Game 6 of that Series, the Giants held a commanding 5–0 lead with starting pitcher Russ Ortiz on the mound heading into the bottom of the seventh, and were six outs away from the championship going into the bottom of the eighth despite having their lead cut to two. However, the Angels successfully completed their rally in the bottom of the eighth for one of the greatest comebacks in World Series history. The Giants lost Game 7 (and the Series) the next day 4–1. The Giants’ 2002 World Series collapse was considered another manifestation of the curse by fans and San Francisco media.

Within the same timeframe, the Dodgers, who had only one World Series win in Brooklyn (1955), had much better luck in Los Angeles, winning in 1959, 1963, 1965, 1981, and 1988.

== The end of the curse ==
In 2001, historian and author Mike Hanlon suggested to Giants owner Peter Magowan to have a new plaque to be installed at AT&T Park (now named Oracle Park) in an effort to end the curse. In 2006 the development of the new plaque began but took two years due to problems of production. In 2008 the Eddie Grant plaque was installed on the tower at right field. The installation of the plaque would prove fortuitous for the team's chances of winning the championship. In 2010, the Giants won the division after passing the San Diego Padres for the NL West division lead on the final day of the season. The Giants qualified to play in the World Series after defeating the Atlanta Braves in the National League Division Series and the Philadelphia Phillies (who made back-to-back World Series appearances in the previous year) in the National League Championship Series. The Giants defeated the Texas Rangers in five games to win the World Series championship for the first time since moving to San Francisco in 1958, thus ending the 52-year Curse of Coogan's Bluff. Following their 2010 championship, the Giants would win two more world championships in the next four years—in 2012 and in 2014.

Despite the Giants' three championships in quick succession bringing a definitive end to the curse, fans have noted that all three titles were clinched away from San Francisco, leading some to wonder if some faint echo of the hex still indeed remains in their new home city.

== See also ==
- Baseball superstition
- Curse of the Bambino – A similar superstition surrounding the Boston Red Sox (ended in 2004)
- Curse of the Billy Goat – A similar superstition surrounding the Chicago Cubs (ended in 2016)
- Curse of the Black Sox – A similar superstition surrounding the Chicago White Sox (ended in 2005)
- Curse of Rocky Colavito – A similar superstition surrounding the Cleveland Guardians (formerly Indians) (ongoing)
- Curse of the Colonel – A similar superstition surrounding the Hanshin Tigers (ended in 2023)
- Sports-related curses
