= 2010 National League Championship Series =

Team (Wins)	Managers	Season
San Francisco Giants (4)	Bruce Bochy	92–70 (.568), GA: 2
Philadelphia Phillies (2)	Charlie Manuel	97–65 (.599), GA: 6
- Dates: October 16–23
- MVP: Cody Ross (San Francisco)
- Umpires: Derryl Cousins (crew chief), Dan Iassogna, Ted Barrett, Wally Bell, Jeff Nelson, Tom Hallion

Broadcast
- Television: Fox
- TV announcers: Joe Buck and Tim McCarver
- Radio: ESPN
- Radio announcers: Dan Shulman and Dave Campbell
- NLDS: Philadelphia Phillies over Cincinnati Reds (3–0); San Francisco Giants over Atlanta Braves (3–1)

The 2010 National League Championship Series (NLCS) was a best-of-seven playoff series in Major League Baseball’s 2010 postseason that pitted the overall #1 seed Philadelphia Phillies and the second-seeded San Francisco Giants — against each other for the National League pennant. The Giants would defeat the heavily favored Phillies, four games to two, to advance to their first World Series since 2002. The series, the 41st NLCS in league history, began on October 16 and ended on October 23. The Phillies had home field advantage as a result of their better regular-season record. The Phillies hosted Games 1, 2 and 6, while the Giants were at home for Games 3, 4 and 5.

The Giants would go on to defeat the Texas Rangers in the World Series in five games, winning their first World Series championship since 1954, and their first since relocating to San Francisco from New York City back in 1958, ending the Curse of Coogan's Bluff.

== Summary ==
=== Philadelphia Phillies vs. San Francisco Giants ===
San Francisco won the series, 4–2.

Game	Date	Score	Location	Time	Attendance
1	October 16	San Francisco Giants – 4, Philadelphia Phillies – 3	Citizens Bank Park	2:59	45,929
2	October 17	San Francisco Giants – 1, Philadelphia Phillies – 6	Citizens Bank Park	3:01	46,099
3	October 19	Philadelphia Phillies – 0, San Francisco Giants – 3	AT&T Park	2:39	43,320
4	October 20	Philadelphia Phillies – 5, San Francisco Giants – 6	AT&T Park	3:40	43,515
5	October 21	Philadelphia Phillies – 4, San Francisco Giants – 2	AT&T Park	3:15	43,713
6	October 23	San Francisco Giants – 3, Philadelphia Phillies – 2	Citizens Bank Park	3:41	46,062

== Game summaries ==
=== Game 1 ===
October 16, 2010 7:30 pm (EDT) at Citizens Bank Park in Philadelphia, Pennsylvania 57 °F (14 °C), clear
Team	1	2	3	4	5	6	7	8	9	R	H	E
San Francisco	0	0	1	0	1	2	0	0	0	4	9	0
Philadelphia	0	0	1	0	0	2	0	0	0	3	7	0
WP: Tim Lincecum (1–0) LP: Roy Halladay (0–1) Sv: Brian Wilson (1); Home runs: SF: Cody Ross 2 (2); PHI: Carlos Ruiz (1), Jayson Werth (1); Attendance: 45,929; Boxscore

In one of the most touted postseason pitching matchups in recent history, two former Cy Young Award winners faced off: Roy Halladay for the Phillies and Tim Lincecum for the Giants. The Giants jumped out to a 1–0 lead in the top of the third inning on a Cody Ross solo home run, Halladay's first hit allowed in the postseason. The Phillies quickly tied the game up in the bottom half of the same inning on a home run from catcher Carlos Ruiz.

The game remained tied until the top of the fifth inning, when Ross belted his second homer of the game, another solo shot, giving San Francisco a 2–1 lead. The Giants extended that lead to 4–1 the following inning on a string of three two-out hits, namely, a single by Buster Posey, a double by former Phillie Pat Burrell, and a single from Juan Uribe. In the bottom of the same inning, the sixth, the Phillies closed the deficit to 4–3 on a two-run blast from Jayson Werth.

Lincecum and Halladay then each pitched a scoreless half of the seventh before turning the game over to their respective bullpens. Southpaw Javier López retired the first two Philadelphia batters of the eighth inning, then handed the ball to Giants closer Brian Wilson, who recorded a four-out save, striking out Shane Victorino to end the game.

=== Game 2 ===
October 17, 2010 8:00 pm (EDT) at Citizens Bank Park in Philadelphia, Pennsylvania 59 °F (15 °C), clear
Team	1	2	3	4	5	6	7	8	9	R	H	E
San Francisco	0	0	0	0	1	0	0	0	0	1	4	1
Philadelphia	1	0	0	0	1	0	4	0	X	6	8	0
WP: Roy Oswalt (1–0) LP: Jonathan Sánchez (0–1); Home runs: SF: Cody Ross (3); PHI: None; Attendance: 46,099; Boxscore

In the first inning Chase Utley walked, then stole second. Mike Fontenot misfielded Plácido Polanco's grounder and everybody advanced. Ryan Howard and Jimmy Rollins both walked, bringing in Utley for the first run. Oswalt no-hit the Giants through the fifth inning until Cody Ross hit a home run, his third in two games. This was the third straight game in which Ross's solo home run broke up a no-hitter. In the bottom inning, Shane Victorino doubled, then advanced to third on a Utley fly out. Polanco's sacrifice fly brought in the second Phillie run.

In the bottom of the seventh inning Oswalt hit a single up the middle. That knocked Sánchez out of the game, bringing in Ramón Ramírez. Oswalt then advanced on a Victorino sacrifice bunt. Polanco then ripped a single up the middle bringing in Oswalt. Ramírez was brought down and in came Jeremy Affeldt. Affeldt struck out Howard then intentionally walked Jayson Werth. Giants manager Bruce Bochy then sent in Santiago Casilla to face Jimmy Rollins. Rollins ripped a three-run double off Casilla, extending the Phillies' lead to five.

With a five-run lead, Oswalt pitched a scoreless eighth. He struck out nine while allowing three hits and walking three.

=== Game 3 ===
October 19, 2010 1:00 pm (PDT) at AT&T Park in San Francisco, California 67 °F (19 °C), sunny
Team	1	2	3	4	5	6	7	8	9	R	H	E
Philadelphia	0	0	0	0	0	0	0	0	0	0	3	1
San Francisco	0	0	0	2	1	0	0	0	X	3	4	0
WP: Matt Cain (1–0) LP: Cole Hamels (0–1) Sv: Brian Wilson (2); Attendance: 43,320; Boxscore

With the series shifting to San Francisco for a day Game 3, and the series tied 1–1, both teams again threw very good starting pitchers, 2008 World Series MVP Cole Hamels for Philadelphia and All-Star Matt Cain for San Francisco. Both starters started out strong, dominating the first three innings. In the fourth inning, however, the Giants broke through against Hamels. Édgar Rentería led off with a base hit to right, and was bunted to second by Freddy Sanchez. Following Buster Posey's strikeout and Pat Burrell's walk, Cody Ross ripped a fastball down the left field line for an RBI single, his fourth RBI of the NLCS. Aubrey Huff then singled off the glove of a diving Chase Utley, bringing in Burrell and making the score 2–0, Giants.

The Giants added a third run in the next inning, when Aaron Rowand led off the inning with a double to left and scored on a Sanchez single that fooled Chase Utley. With a 3–0 lead, Matt Cain cruised through the Phillies lineup. In the seventh inning, he ran into trouble, but was able to get Shane Victorino to groundout to Sanchez with the bases loaded for the third out. Javier López relieved Cain and tossed a perfect eighth, striking out Ryan Howard to end the inning.

Brian Wilson closed out the game by getting Raúl Ibañez to ground into a double play with one out and Jimmy Rollins at first. The Giants now had a 2–1 NLCS advantage.

=== Game 4 ===
October 20, 2010 4:30 pm (PDT) at AT&T Park in San Francisco, California 65 °F (18 °C), mostly clear
Team	1	2	3	4	5	6	7	8	9	R	H	E
Philadelphia	0	0	0	0	4	0	0	1	0	5	9	1
San Francisco	1	0	1	0	1	2	0	0	1	6	11	0
WP: Brian Wilson (1–0) LP: Roy Oswalt (1–1); Attendance: 43,515; Boxscore

Game 4 was a match up of both teams' fourth starters, 21-year-old Madison Bumgarner for the Giants and Joe Blanton for the Phillies. The Giants scored first, when Buster Posey lined an RBI single into center field that scored Freddy Sanchez. Posey struck again in the third inning, scoring Huff on a two-out double over the head of left fielder Ben Francisco, increasing the Giants' lead to 2–0.

The Phillies' offense broke through in the fifth inning against Bumgarner. Back-to-back singles by Francisco and Carlos Ruiz opened the inning, and Blanton hit a sacrifice bunt to advance both runners into scoring position. Shane Victorino then hit a single up the middle, scoring Francisco; however, Ruiz was thrown out at home plate by Giants center fielder Aaron Rowand. Chase Utley singled to right and Santiago Casilla was brought in to face Plácido Polanco. Polanco doubled in both runners, giving the Phillies a 3–2 lead. Ryan Howard was then intentionally walked and Jayson Werth was hit by a pitch. Facing Jimmy Rollins, Casilla threw a wild pitch, bringing home a fourth Phillies run. Casilla finally ended the inning by striking out Rollins.

The Giants got a run back on an Aubrey Huff single up the middle in the bottom of the fifth, which scored Andrés Torres. In the sixth inning, Pat Burrell drew a leadoff walk and advanced to third on a Cody Ross double. Pablo Sandoval came to the plate and appeared to double down the right field line, but the ball was called foul. Four pitches later, Sandoval lined a two-run double into the left-center field gap, scoring Burrell and Ross, and giving the Giants a 5–4 lead.

The Phillies tied it in the top of the eighth with back-to-back doubles by Howard and Werth. Giants reliever Sergio Romo recovered and retired the next three Phillies batters to strand Werth at second. Going to the ninth inning, the game was tied 5–5. In the top of the ninth, Giants closer Brian Wilson threw a 1-2-3 inning.

In the bottom of the ninth, Game 2 winner Roy Oswalt was brought in as a reliever. Sanchez lined out to right field to start the inning, but Huff singled past a diving Howard immediately afterwards. Posey followed with a base hit to right—his fourth hit of the game—moving Huff to third with only one out. Juan Uribe, pinch hitting in the pitcher's spot, followed with a sacrifice fly to left field, allowing Huff to tag up and score the winning run. The victory gave the Giants a commanding 3–1 series lead.

=== Game 5 ===
October 21, 2010 4:30 pm (PDT) at AT&T Park in San Francisco, California 62 °F (17 °C), cloudy
Team	1	2	3	4	5	6	7	8	9	R	H	E
Philadelphia	0	0	3	0	0	0	0	0	1	4	6	1
San Francisco	1	0	0	1	0	0	0	0	0	2	7	2
WP: Roy Halladay (1–1) LP: Tim Lincecum (1–1) Sv: Brad Lidge (1); Home runs: PHI: Jayson Werth (2); SF: None; Attendance: 43,713; Boxscore

Game 5 saw a rematch of Game 1's starting pitchers: Roy Halladay of the Phillies and Tim Lincecum of the Giants. In the bottom of the first inning Halladay walked leadoff hitter Andrés Torres. Freddy Sanchez followed up with a single, advancing Torres to third. Aubrey Huff lined out to first baseman Ryan Howard, followed by a Buster Posey RBI groundout to second.

The Phillies struck in the top of the third inning. Raúl Ibañez singled, and Carlos Ruiz was hit by a pitch. Halladay then bunted the ball, which dropped in the home plate area, and the ball was ruled a fair ball by home plate umpire Jeff Nelson. Giants catcher Posey quickly picked up the ball and threw to third baseman Pablo Sandoval in an attempt to throw out Ibáñez; however, Sandoval, who was playing shallowly in anticipation of the bunt, misjudged the position of third base while retreating to the bag, allowing Ibáñez to reach safely. Meanwhile, Halladay, thinking the ball was foul, did not begin his run to first base until after Ibáñez was ruled safe, and Sandoval had enough time to throw the ball to first base to retire Halladay. Television replays showed the ball was in foul territory when Posey picked it up, which means it should have been ruled a foul ball.

Then, Giants first baseman Aubrey Huff committed an error on a grounder by Shane Victorino, scoring two runners. Plácido Polanco added to the lead with an RBI single.

In the bottom of the fourth with one out Pat Burrell hit a double to left and scored on a Cody Ross RBI double.

Phillies relievers José Contreras and J. C. Romero combined to shut the Giants down in the seventh inning. Then Phillies middle reliever Ryan Madson pitched a perfect eighth inning, striking out Posey, Burrell, and Ross.

In the top of the ninth Jayson Werth hit a solo homer off Ramón Ramírez to extend the lead to two.

Phillies closer Brad Lidge pitched a perfect ninth inning to collect his 12th postseason save out of 12 opportunities with Philadelphia (and the 18th of his career). To send the series back to Philadelphia.

=== Game 6 ===
October 23, 2010 7:30 pm (EDT) at Citizens Bank Park in Philadelphia, Pennsylvania 59 °F (15 °C), partly cloudy
Team	1	2	3	4	5	6	7	8	9	R	H	E
San Francisco	0	0	2	0	0	0	0	1	0	3	13	0
Philadelphia	2	0	0	0	0	0	0	0	0	2	8	1
WP: Javier López (1–0) LP: Ryan Madson (0–1) Sv: Brian Wilson (3); Home runs: SF: Juan Uribe (1); PHI: None; Attendance: 46,062; Boxscore

San Francisco starter Jonathan Sánchez had a poor outing. In the first inning, he walked Plácido Polanco and threw a wild pitch to Chase Utley that advanced Polanco to second base. Polanco then scored on an Utley RBI double, and Utley himself scored later in the inning on a sacrifice fly by Jayson Werth.

San Francisco rallied against Phillies starter Roy Oswalt in the third inning. Sánchez singled off his opposite number and advanced to second base on a long fly ball from Andrés Torres that was dropped up against the center field wall by Shane Victorino. Freddy Sanchez bunted the runners over to second and third and Aubrey Huff hit a single up the middle, which only scored Sánchez as Torres was thrown out at home by Victorino. Huff took second base on the throw home and eventually scored on a throwing error by Polanco to tie the game at 2–2.

Sánchez was still very wild with his command as he walked Polanco and hit Utley to start off the bottom of the third. Utley flipped the ball back towards the mound which led to Sánchez and Utley exchanging hostile words. The confrontation led to both benches clearing. No one was ejected as a result of the incident, but Sánchez was removed from the game and replaced with Jeremy Affeldt. Affeldt was effective for the Giants, retiring the next three Phillies to end the scoring threat in the third, then throwing a 1-2-3 fourth inning.

In the fifth, Affeldt was relieved by Madison Bumgarner. Jimmy Rollins singled and advanced to third on a two-out double from Ryan Howard. After walking Werth intentionally, Bumgarner got out of the jam by getting Victorino to ground out with the bases loaded.

Oswalt got into a jam himself in the top of the sixth, when Cody Ross doubled and Juan Uribe was hit by a pitch. Oswalt got out of the jam by getting Édgar Rentería to ground into Utley who executed the double play. Bumgarner faced yet another jam in the bottom of the sixth, as Raúl Ibañez doubled to lead off the inning and was bunted over to third by Carlos Ruiz. Bumgarner then struck out pinch hitter Ben Francisco and induced a fly ball out from Rollins to end the threat once again.

The Giants finally broke through in the top of the eighth, when Uribe hit an opposite field home run off Philadelphia reliever Ryan Madson. Tim Lincecum, who was the Giants' starting pitcher in Games 1 and 5, then entered the game in a relief role to pitch the eighth inning. Lincecum struck out Werth, but gave up back-to-back singles to Victorino and Ibáñez. Giants manager Bruce Bochy promptly brought in closer Brian Wilson for a five-out save. Phillies catcher Ruiz hit a line drive right at Giants first baseman Huff, who caught the ball and easily doubled off Victorino at second to get out of the inning.

At the top of the ninth, Phillies closer Brad Lidge allowed two hits and an intentional walk of Buster Posey to load the bases but escaped the jam without allowing any scoring after getting the pitcher Wilson to groundout to Howard at first. Wilson got pinch hitter Ross Gload to ground out to start the bottom of the ninth, but then walked Rollins to put the tying run on base. Polanco grounded into a fielder's choice to Uribe, who threw to second to force out Rollins. Utley then drew a walk, which put the winning run on first base. With a full count and the runners moving on the pitch, Wilson struck out Howard looking to end the game and send the Giants to their first World Series in eight years.

=== Composite line score ===
2010 NLCS (4–2): San Francisco Giants over Philadelphia Phillies

Team	1	2	3	4	5	6	7	8	9	R	H	E
San Francisco Giants	2	0	4	3	4	4	0	1	1	19	48	3
Philadelphia Phillies	3	0	4	0	5	2	4	1	1	20	41	4
Total attendance: 268,638 Average attendance: 44,773

== Broadcasting ==
Fox televised the NLCS in the United States, with Joe Buck providing play-by-play and Tim McCarver as commentator. Every pitch of 2010 NLCS was also broadcast on ESPN Radio with Dan Shulman (play-by-play) and Dave Campbell (color commentator). The series did not air in Cablevision homes after News Corporation, Fox's parent company, pulled station WTXF on October 16 as the result of a carriage dispute with Cablevision.
