= 2010 KBO–NPB Club Championship =

The KBO–NPB Club Championship 2010 was contested between the champions of Nippon Professional Baseball's Japan Series, and the Korea Baseball Organization's Korean Series on Saturday, 13 November 2010. The game was played at the Tokyo Dome. The 2010 Championship was won by Japan's Chiba Lotte Marines.

== Game summary ==
Team	1	2	3	4	5	6	7	8	9	R	H	E
SK Wyverns	0	0	0	0	0	0	0	0	0	0	2	0
Chiba Lotte Marines	0	2	0	0	1	0	0	0	X	3	9	0
WP: Yuki Karakawa LP: Ken Kadokura Sv: Hiroyuki Kobayashi; Home runs: CL: Toshiaki Imae (1); SK: None
