= Aaron Rowand =

American baseball player (born 1977)

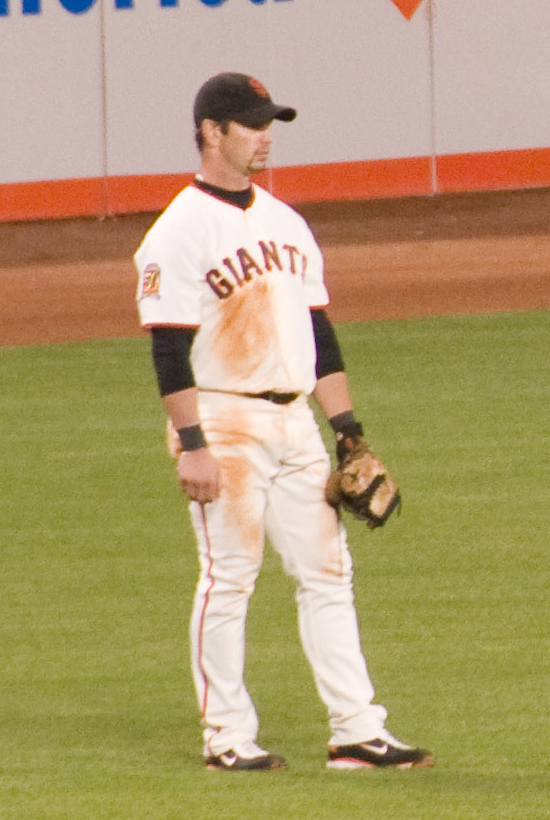
- Rowand with the San Francisco Giants
- Center fielder
- Born: August 29, 1977 (age 49); Portland, Oregon, U.S.
- Batted: Right Threw: Right

MLB debut
- June 16, 2001, for the Chicago White Sox

Last MLB appearance
- August 30, 2011, for the San Francisco Giants

MLB statistics
- Batting average: .273
- Home runs: 136
- Runs batted in: 536
- Stats at Baseball Reference

Teams
- Chicago White Sox (2001–2005); Philadelphia Phillies (2006–2007); San Francisco Giants (2008–2011)

Career highlights and awards
- All-Star (2007); 2× World Series champion (2005, 2010); Gold Glove Award (2007)

Aaron Ryan Rowand (born August 29, 1977) is an American former professional baseball center fielder. He played in Major League Baseball (MLB) for the Chicago White Sox, Philadelphia Phillies, and San Francisco Giants, winning two World Series championships. During his playing days, Rowand stood 6 feet (1.8 m) tall and weighed 210 pounds (95 kg). He batted and threw right-handed.

Born in Portland, Oregon, Rowand was raised in Glendora, California. He attended California State University, Fullerton, where he was named an All-American in 1998. Drafted by the White Sox in the first round that year, he debuted with the team in 2001. By 2004, he was the team's everyday center fielder. He hit 24 home runs in 2004, batting .310. In 2005, he was part of the White Sox team that defeated the Houston Astros in the World Series for their first championship since 1917. After the season, he was traded to the Phillies as part of a trade that sent Jim Thome to Chicago. During his time with Chicago, Rowand was extremely popular with White Sox fans, owing to his all-out style of play.

On May 11, 2006, Rowand made a spectacular catch, smashing face-first into the wall to rob Xavier Nady of a hit. He had his best season in 2007, playing in his only All-Star Game, hitting a career-high 27 home runs, winning a Gold Glove Award, and finishing 22nd in Most Valuable Player Award voting. A free agent after that season, he signed a five-year, $60 million contract with the Giants. Though he led NL outfielders in range factor in 2008, his statistics were not as good as they had been earlier in his career. By 2010, he was no longer the team's regular center fielder, having lost the job to Andrés Torres. However, Rowand became a World Series champion for the second time when the Giants defeated the Texas Rangers in 2010. In August 2011, he was designated for assignment and released. Following his playing career, he served as a backup broadcaster and minor league coach in the White Sox organization.

== Early life ==
Aaron Ryan Rowand was born on August 29, 1977, in Portland, Oregon, and grew up in Glendora, California. His father, Bob, was employed in the air conditioning business. When Rowand was about 10 years old, he frequently played slow-pitch softball in an adult league with his dad. He graduated from Glendora High School in 1995. Rowand was the only Glendora player to have his number retired until Adam Plutko in 2020. According to his high school coach, Rowand hit over .650 during his time at Glendora. He was drafted by the New York Mets in the 40th round of the 1995 Major League Baseball (MLB) draft, but chose to go to college instead of signing with the team.

== College career ==
Rowand attended California State University, Fullerton, playing for their baseball team (the Titans) from 1996 through 1998.

During his junior season, Rowand set a Cal State Fullerton record with 27 doubles. Rowand earned All-America honors in 1998 as the Titans won the Big West South Division title. Over his three years with the college team, he batted .345 with 126 runs scored, 180 hits, 39 doubles, six triples, 23 home runs, and 121 runs batted in (RBI). He stole 32 bases.

After graduating, Rowand would return to Cal State Fullerton for its annual Alumni Game. In 1996 and 1997, he played collegiate summer baseball with the Brewster Whitecaps of the Cape Cod Baseball League, where he was named a league all-star both seasons.

== Professional career ==
=== Draft and minor leagues ===
In 1998, Rowand was selected by the Chicago White Sox in the first round (35th pick) of the draft. He started his professional career that season with the Single-A Hickory Crawdads of the South Atlantic League. Playing 61 games for the club, he batted .342, hitting five home runs and recording 32 RBI. The following year, he played his first full professional season with the Single-A advanced Winston-Salem Warthogs of the Carolina League, batting .279 in 133 games. He led the team in doubles (37), home runs (24), and RBI (88).

In 2000, Rowand played for the Double-A Birmingham Barons of the Southern League. He hit 20 home runs and recorded 98 RBI while playing in 139 games. According to Brittany Ghiroli of MLB.com, "By spring 2001, the future National League All-Star looked primed to break through to the big leagues." Rowand began the year with the Triple-A Charlotte Knights of the International League, where through the middle of June he had 16 home runs and 48 RBI in 62 games.

=== Chicago White Sox (2001–2005) ===
==== 2001 ====
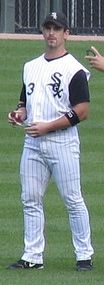
Aaron Rowand in center field on October 5, 2005

In June 2001, Rowand was called up to the White Sox for the first time. He made his major league debut for them the next day as a pinch hitter against the St. Louis Cardinals. He collected his first major league hit on June 19, 2001, in the first game of a doubleheader. The hit came against Kansas City Royals' pitcher Tony Cogan in Chicago's 5–3 victory. On July 7, he hit his first major league home run against Jason Schmidt in a 4–1 win over the Pittsburgh Pirates. Although he was initially used sparingly, in the middle of July Rowand began splitting time with Chris Singleton in center field. In 63 games (123 at bats), he batted .293 with 21 runs scored, 36 hits, five doubles, four home runs, and 20 RBI.

==== 2002 ====
Rowand was part of the Opening Day roster for the White Sox in 2002, but he spent much of the season as a reserve outfielder. Following the trade of Kenny Lofton to the San Francisco Giants on July 28, Rowand became the everyday center fielder for much of the rest of the year. Only batting .204 through July 28, Rowand batted .291 for the remainder of the season. On August 13, he four hits and scored three runs in a 12–3 victory over the Texas Rangers. He had four RBI on September 11, including a two-run home run against Darrell May, in a 9–6 loss to Kansas City. In 126 games (302 at bats), he batted .258 with 41 runs scored, 78 hits, 16 doubles, seven home runs, and 29 RBI.

==== 2003 ====
Rowand suffered a broken left shoulder blade and rib in a dirt bike accident in the 2002–03 offseason and spent part of 2003 spring training recovering. He was ready in time for Opening Day and began 2003 as the regular center fielder. After hitting .133 in his first 28 games, Rowand was sent to Charlotte in early May. In 32 games with the Knights, he batted .242 with three home runs and 13 RBI before getting recalled to rejoin the White Sox around June 10. Though mostly a backup outfielder for the rest of the year, he hit .381 for the rest of the season. In 93 games (170 at bats), he batted .287 with 22 runs scored, 45 hits, eight doubles, six home runs, and 24 RBI.

==== 2004 ====
In 2004, Rowand held the centerfield job for the entire season. On May 23, he scored four runs, recorded four hits, and hit a three-run home run against Terry Mulholland as the White Sox beat the Minnesota Twins by a score of 17–7. He had four hits and scored three runs on July 19 in a 12–6 win over the Rangers. Facing the Boston Red Sox on August 13, he hit two home runs in a game for the first time, both coming against Tim Wakefield, as the White Sox won 8–7. Five days later, he had another two-home-run game, hitting his first ever grand slam against Jeremy Bonderman in a 9–2 victory over the Detroit Tigers. José Contreras, the starting pitcher for the White Sox in both of Rowand's two-home-run games, said, "I owe him something a little bigger than dinner." In 140 games (487 at bats), Rowand batted .310 with 94 runs scored, 151 hits, 38 doubles, 24 home runs, and 69 RBI. He set a career high with 17 stolen bases. His 5.7 Wins Above Replacement (WAR) figure was seventh in the American League (AL) and fourth among AL position players (trailing only Ichiro Suzuki's 9.2, Alex Rodriguez's 7.6, and Miguel Tejada's 7.4).

==== 2005 ====
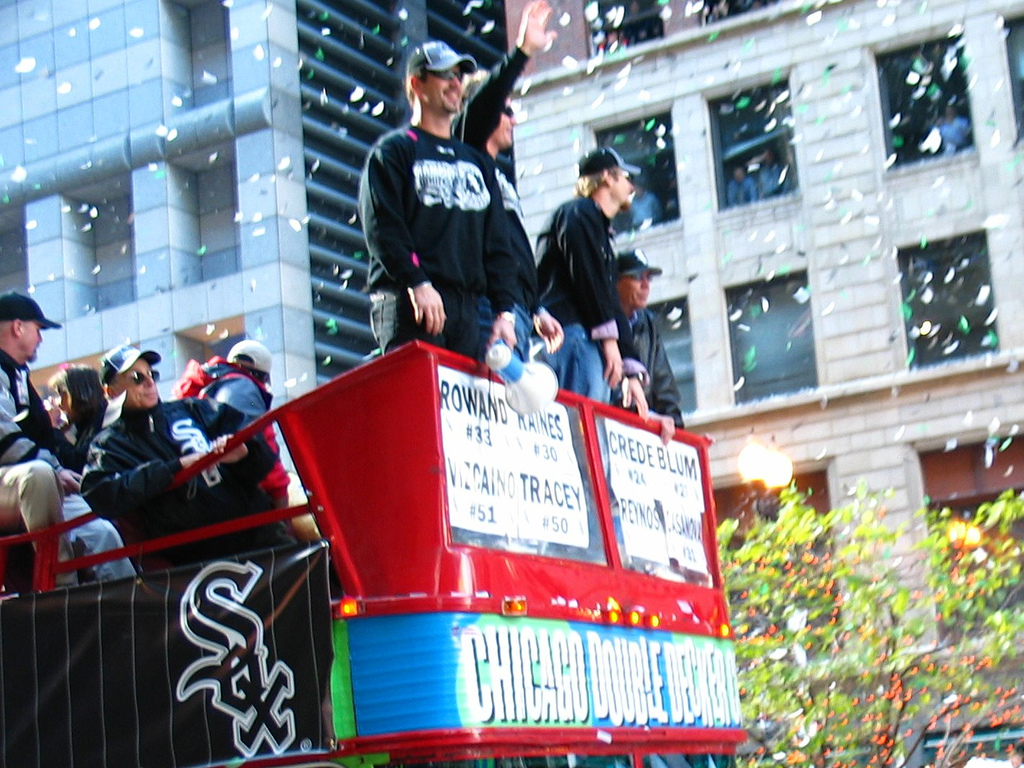
Aaron Rowand at the White Sox parade celebrating their victory in the 2005 World Series

On June 10, 2005, with the White Sox leading the San Diego Padres by two runs in the seventh inning, Rowand made two run-saving plays. First, he threw out Phil Nevin in a close play at third base. Next, with runners on second and third and two outs, he made a diving catch to rob Khalil Greene of a hit and end the inning. The White Sox won 4–2. Two days later, after entering the game as a pinch hitter in the eighth inning, Rowand hit a go-ahead, three-run, 10th-inning home run against Trevor Hoffman, helping the White Sox beat the Padres 8–5. Rowand had three hits and scored three runs on July 16 in a 7–5 victory over the Cleveland Indians. On September 13, he had four hits and a career-high three doubles in a 6–4 win over the Kansas City Royals. White Sox manager Ozzie Guillén said, "Rowand had a big night. From now on somebody needs to step up and be a hero every game. Tonight it was Rowand." In 2005, he had a .270 batting average with 77 runs and 30 doubles. Rowand also hit 13 home runs and stole 16 bases. He walked 32 times and struck out 116. He had a .329 on-base percentage (OBP) and a .407 slugging percentage (SLG). He also collected 235 total bases. Defensively, he collected 388 putouts and committed only three errors, for a .978 fielding percentage. His defensive WAR of 1.9 was the seventh-best in the AL.

The White Sox won the AL Central title, advancing to the playoffs for the first time in Rowand's career. In the first game of the AL Division Series (ALDS) against the Boston Red Sox, he slammed into the wall chasing after a ball even though the White Sox were up by 14 runs. He batted .400 with two RBI in the ALDS, which Chicago swept in three games. In the AL Championship Series (ALCS), he batted .167 with three hits (all doubles), three runs scored, and one RBI as the White Sox defeated the Los Angeles Angels in five games. Against the Houston Astros in the World Series, he batted .294. Though he had no RBI, he scored two runs and had five hits as the White Sox swept the Astros, earning their first World Series championship since 1917.

During his time in Chicago, Rowand was a favorite of the fans because of his style of play. He would run hard after balls hit to center field, not afraid to crash into the outfield wall if it was necessary to make a catch. "White Sox fans have always reserved a special place for Aaron because of his all-out style of play and love for the game," observed Director of Player Development Nick Capra in 2015.

=== Philadelphia Phillies (2006–2007) ===
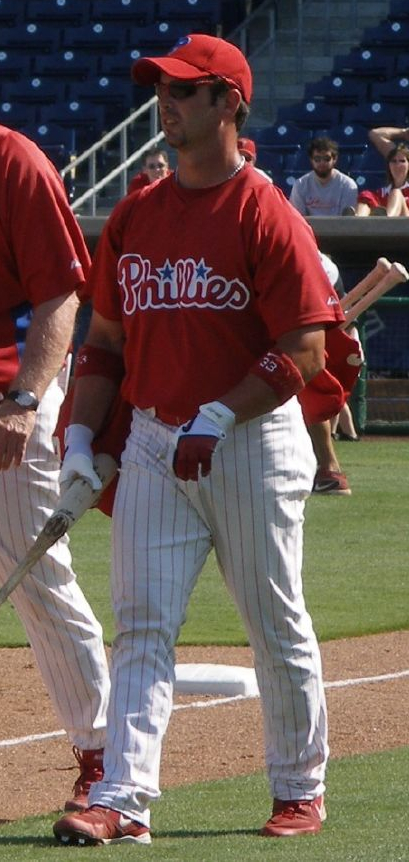
Rowand on March 11, 2007

==== 2006 ====
After the 2005 season, on November 23, Rowand was traded with minor league pitchers Gio González and Daniel Haigwood to the Philadelphia Phillies for first baseman Jim Thome. Chicago wanted Thome for his skill at hitting home runs, and Philadelphia needed a new center fielder because it was not planning to re-sign Lofton.

Rowand's bases-loaded triple in the seventh inning against Matt Herges of the Florida Marlins on May 2, 2006, brought the Phillies from a one-run deficit to a 7–5 lead, which they would hold for the rest of the game. On May 11, in the first inning against the Mets, Rowand made a spectacular play by smashing into the center field fence of Citizens Bank Park face first at full speed in order to run down a deep fly ball off the bat of Xavier Nady with the bases loaded. Had the ball fallen for a hit, three runs likely would have scored. "It might be the best catch I've ever seen," said manager Charlie Manuel, praising Rowand's "effort and determination". Robert Knapel of Bleacher Report named it the 12th-best catch in baseball history in 2012, and, in 2019, Thomas Harrigan of MLB.com listed the catch as among the best ever. Rain shortened the game to five innings, and the Phillies won 2–0. Rowand suffered a broken nose and severe lacerations to his face as a result of running into the wall. He underwent seven hours of surgery to repair the nose, and was placed on the 15-day disabled list. He returned to the starting lineup on May 27.

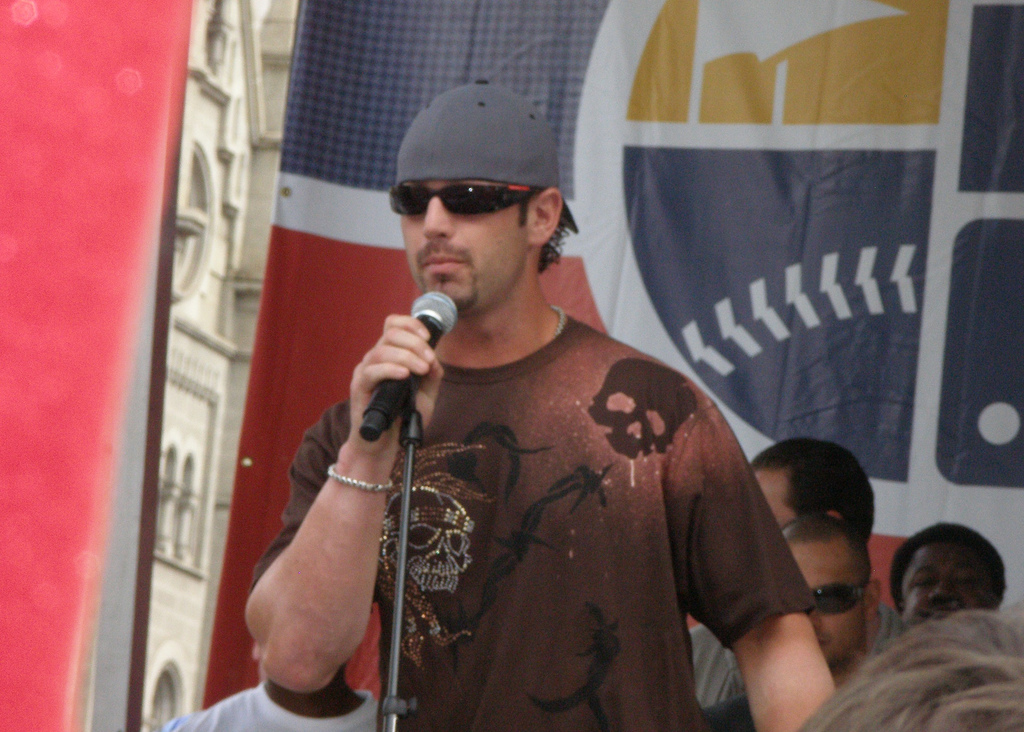
Rowand at a 2007 Philadelphia Phillies rally, celebrating the team's playoff berth

After batting .301 through June 5, Rowand hit .236 for the remainder of the season. On August 20, he had four hits and scored three runs in a 12–10 victory over the Washington Nationals. The next day, against the Chicago Cubs, Rowand collided with Philadelphia second baseman Chase Utley and broke his ankle. He was on the disabled list for the remainder of the regular season. In 109 games (445 at bats), Rowand batted .262 with 59 runs scored, 106 hits, 24 doubles, 12 home runs, and 47 RBI. He recorded 10 stolen bases, the last time in his career he would steal more than six.

==== 2007 ====
Set to become a free agent for the first time after the 2007 season, Rowand made the year his best offensively. Against the White Sox on June 13, 2007, Rowand had a pinch-hit RBI groundout in the sixth inning, then hit a grand slam against Matt Thornton in the seventh inning, helping the Phillies win 8–4. For the first time in his career in 2007, Rowand was selected to the All-Star Game. He came to bat in the bottom of the ninth with the bases loaded, two outs, and the National League (NL) trailing 5–4. However, Rowand flew out to Alex Ríos in right field to end the game. He had a season-high five hits on July 17 against the Los Angeles Dodgers, also scoring three times and hitting back-to-back home runs with Pat Burrell against Rudy Seánez in Philadelphia's 15–3 triumph. Rowand also had four-hit games on April 27, July 14, and September 22, all Philadelphia victories. With the Phillies thick in the hunt for the playoffs late in the season, on September 17, Rowand hit two home runs against the St. Louis Cardinals. Then, in the eighth inning, he fell to the ground on the warning track as he robbed Ryan Ludwick of a hit that would have driven in the runs to put the Cardinals ahead. Philadelphia won 13–11. He finished the season with a batting average of .309, 105 runs scored (10th in the NL), 189 hits (eighth in the NL), 45 doubles (sixth in the NL), 27 home runs, 89 RBI, and six stolen bases. He earned his first Gold Glove Award for his outfield play that year, leading the NL with 11 outfield assists. Committing only two errors all season, Rowand led NL outfielders with a .995 fielding percentage. He finished 22nd in NL Most Valuable Player Award voting.

Winners of the NL East in 2007, the Phillies faced the Colorado Rockies in the NLDS. Rowand and Burrell hit back-to-back home runs against Jeff Francis to start the fifth inning of Game 1, which Philadelphia would lose 4–2. That was his only hit of the series, which Philadelphia lost in three games.

=== San Francisco Giants (2008–2011) ===
==== 2008 ====
Rowand signed a five-year, $60 million contract with the San Francisco Giants on December 12, 2007, becoming the team's primary offseason free agent signing. In the face of dismal expectations for the team's 2008 season, Rowand proposed in January that the Giants could win the NL West "if guys have some good years". He had three RBIs apiece in back-to-back games against the Marlins on May 23 and 25, the first an 8–2 victory and the second an 8–6 loss in the first game of a doubleheader. In the latter game, he hit his 100th career home run, against Mark Hendrickson. Rowand had one other three-RBI game, which came on August 6 in a 3–2 win over the Atlanta Braves. He batted .342 in his first 54 games (through June 2), but his average was only .233 from June 3 through the rest of the season. On August 13, he had a season-high four hits and scored a run in a 5–4 victory over the Dodgers. The Giants did not win the division, struggling to a 72–90 finish. Rowand himself did not come close to his 2007 numbers with Philadelphia, as his on-base plus slugging percentage dropped from .889 in 2007 to .749. In 152 games (549 at bats), he batted .271 with 57 runs scored, 149 hits, 37 doubles, 13 home runs, and 70 RBI. Defensively, he had the highest range factor among NL outfielders per game (2.81) and per nine innings (2.95).

==== 2009 ====
After only hitting .214 through May 8, 2009, Rowand batted .340 over his next 50 games to raise his batting average to .302 through July 4. However, he would only hit .208 for the rest of the season. On July 10, with one out in the ninth inning, Rowand made a leaping catch at the center field wall to rob Edgar Gonzalez of a hit and preserve Jonathan Sánchez's no hitter. He missed a few games after getting hit by a pitch from Tommy Hanson on July 20, though the resulting contusion was not severe enough to require him to go on the disabled list. On July 31, Rowand collected his 1,000th career hit at home against his former team, the Phillies, when he doubled against Cliff Lee in San Francisco's 5–1 loss. He had four hits and two RBI, including a solo home run against Livan Hernandez, in the first game of a doubleheader against the Mets on August 17, which the Giants won 10–1. Six times during the year, he had a season-high three RBI. In 144 games (499 at bats), he batted .261 with 61 runs scored, 130 hits, 30 doubles, 15 home runs, and 64 RBI.

==== 2010 ====
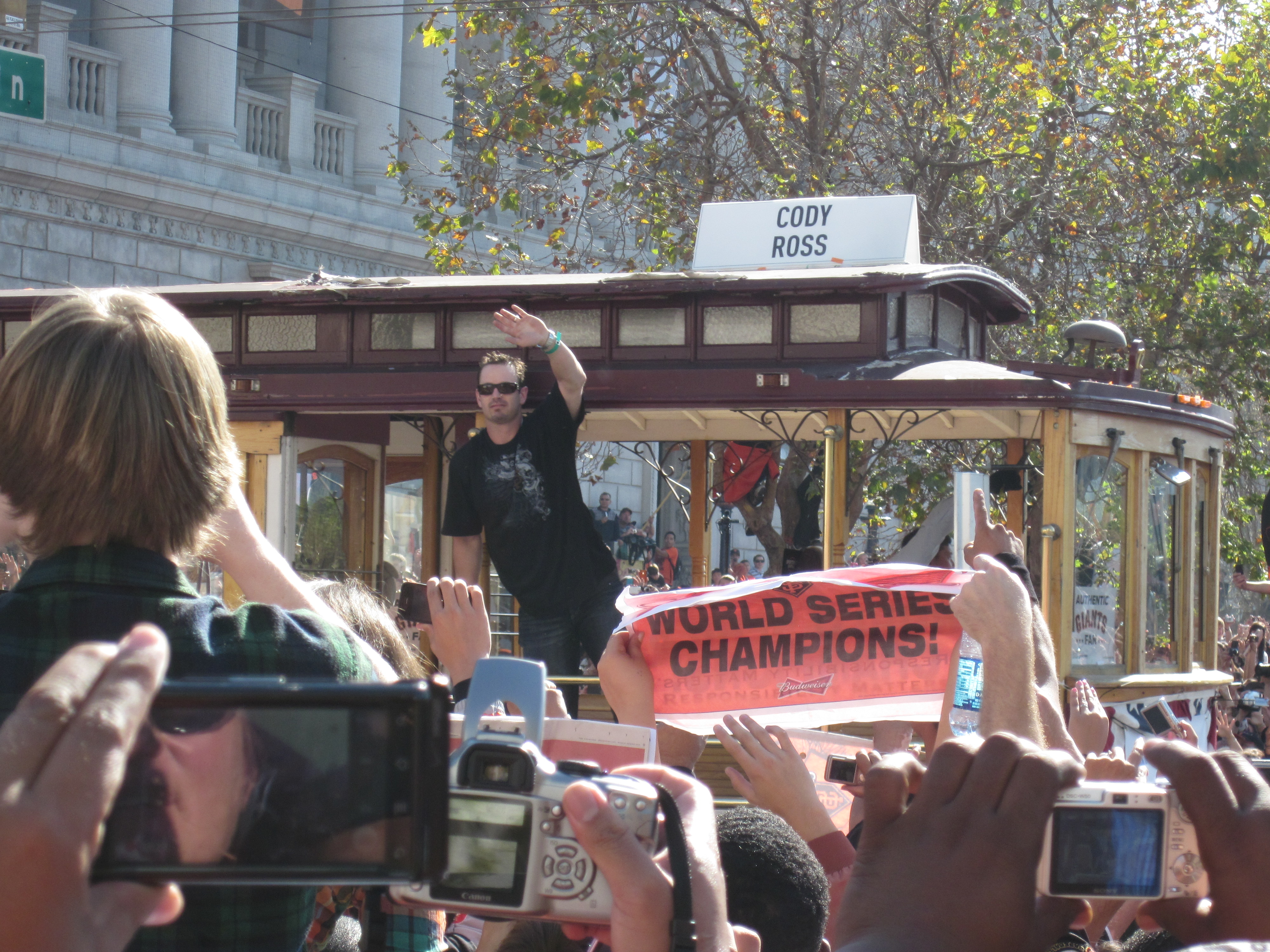
Rowand waving from a cable car in the parade celebrating the Giants' 2010 World Series victory

Rowand had four hits and two RBI against the Astros on April 7 in a 10–4 victory. On April 16, Rowand was hit in the face by a pitch from Vicente Padilla of the Dodgers. He suffered a mild concussion and was on the disabled list until May 2. He had three RBI on May 4, including a two-run home run against Juan Carlos Oviedo, in a 9–6 victory over the Marlins. In June, he began losing playing time to Andrés Torres in center field; by August, his starts were infrequent. He played in 105 games (331 at bats), his fewest appearances since 2003. Batting .230, he had 42 runs scored, 76 hits, 12 doubles, 11 home runs, and 34 RBI.

The Giants won the NL West, and Rowand was part of their roster for the playoffs. He was limited to two pinch-hit appearances in the NLDS, which the Giants won in four games over the Braves. After Torres batted .120 in the first six games of the playoffs, Rowand started in center field in Games 3 and 4 of the NLCS against the Phillies, both Giant victories. He also replaced Torres in the bottom of the ninth inning in Game 6, which the Giants won 3–2 to clinch a trip to the World Series against the Rangers. In Game 2 of the World Series, Rowand hit a two-RBI triple against Michael Kirkman in the bottom of the eighth inning. He then scored on an RBI double by Torres to extend the Giants lead to 9–0, the final score. He also started Game 5 of the series in center field. The Giants won the series, their first World Series victory since 1954, and Rowand earned his second World Series championship.

==== 2011 ====
Rowand began 2011 as a reserve player but was able to get starts in center field and left field from April 10 to May 10 while Torres was on the disabled list with an Achilles injury. He had a season-high three RBI on April 28 (in a 5–2 victory over the Pirates) and on June 28 (in the first game of a doubleheader, a 13–7 win over the Cubs). Rowand was designated for assignment on August 31, 2011, after batting .233 with four home runs and 21 RBI in 108 games during the 2011 season. Brian Sabean, the general manager of the Giants did not elaborate on Rowand's poor performance with the Giants, saying, "It didn't turn out. Nothing more to be said. He's been given opportunities, and it just didn't turn out." Rowand was released on September 8, 2011.

On December 12, 2011, Rowand signed a minor league deal with the Miami Marlins with an invite to spring training. He was released on March 29, 2012, after batting just .128 in spring training.

== Personal life ==
Rowand and his ex-wife Marianne have two children: Tatum and McKay. The family had residences in Las Vegas and California. In 2020, Rowand sold his Las Vegas mansion, purchasing a house overlooking the ocean in San Clemente, California, for $4.833 million.

Rowand's cousin James Shields also played MLB baseball.

Since his retirement, Rowand has occasionally filled in as a TV or radio broadcaster for the White Sox. In 2015, Rowand served as a guest instructor for the Philadelphia Phillies and Chicago White Sox in spring training. In November 2015, the White Sox hired him as an outfielding and base running instructor for the minor league players. The role required him to work with the prospects sporadically throughout the season, then teach them in a month-long instructional camp after the final game of the year. He managed the Arizona Fall League's Glendale Desert Dogs in 2016. By 2020, he had been replaced as the outfielding and base running instructor by Doug Sisson.

During Season 3 of American Chopper: Senior vs. Junior in 2012, Paul Junior Designs built "The Aaron Rowand Bike" for the ballplayer. The black and red motorcycle featured a similar color scheme as the "Black Widow," one of Rowand's favorite designs.
