= Madison Bumgarner =

American baseball player (born 1989)

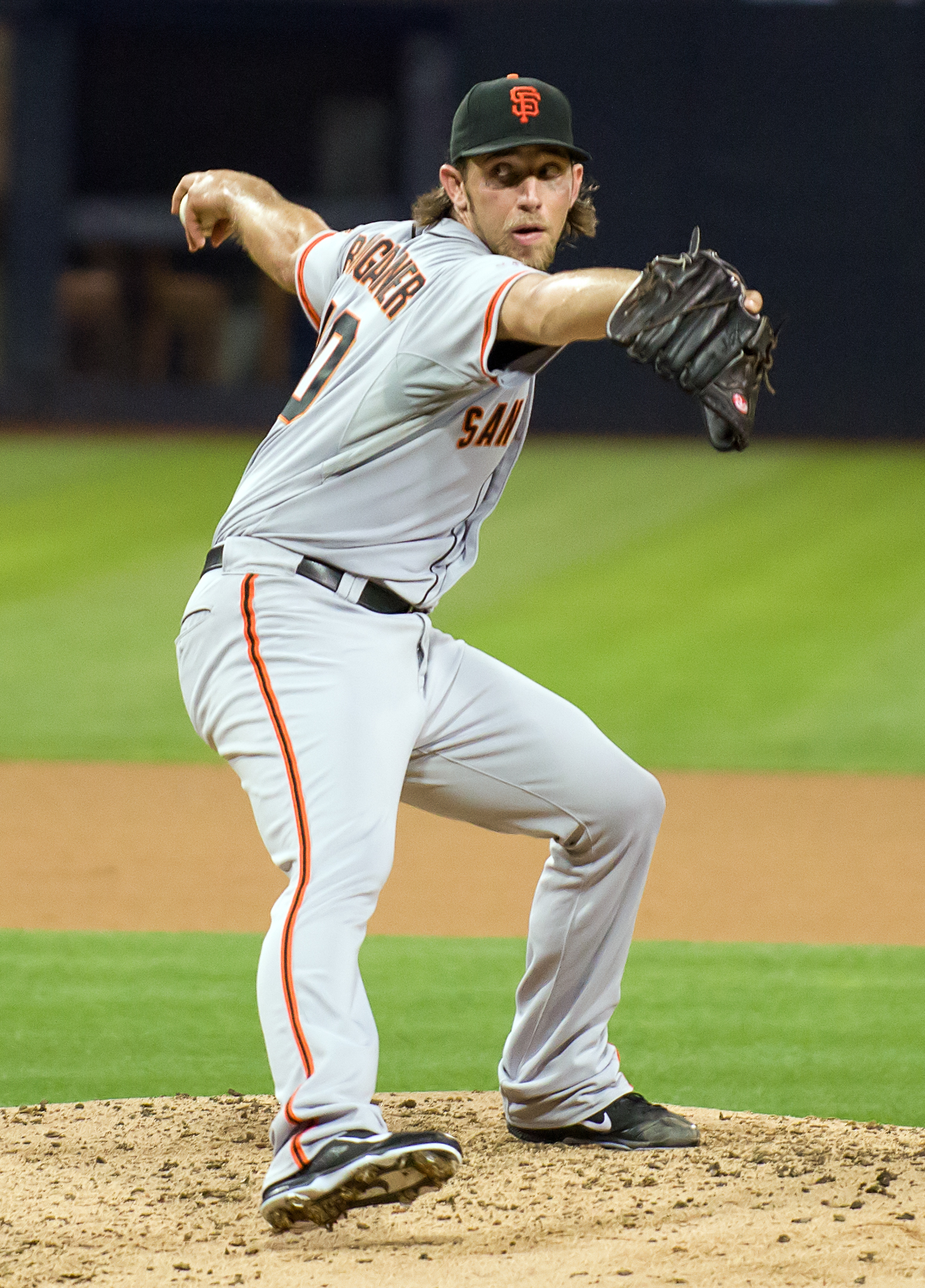
- Bumgarner with the San Francisco Giants in 2013
- Pitcher
- Born: August 1, 1989 (age 37); Hickory, North Carolina, U.S.
- Batted: Right Threw: Left

MLB debut
- September 8, 2009, for the San Francisco Giants

Last MLB appearance
- April 19, 2023, for the Arizona Diamondbacks

MLB statistics
- Win–loss record: 134–124
- Earned run average: 3.47
- Strikeouts: 2,070
- Stats at Baseball Reference

Teams
- San Francisco Giants (2009–2019); Arizona Diamondbacks (2020–2023)

Career highlights and awards
- 4× All-Star (2013–2016); 3× World Series champion (2010, 2012, 2014); World Series MVP (2014); NLCS MVP (2014); 2× Silver Slugger Award (2014, 2015)

Madison Kyle Bumgarner (born August 1, 1989), nicknamed "MadBum", is an American former professional baseball pitcher. He played in Major League Baseball (MLB) for the San Francisco Giants (2009–19) and Arizona Diamondbacks (2020–23). Bumgarner won three World Series championships (2010, 2012, 2014) and two Silver Slugger Awards (2014, 2015). He was also selected to four National League (NL) All-Star teams and has the most strikeouts in franchise history by a Giants left-handed pitcher.

Bumgarner played high school baseball at South Caldwell High School in Hudson, North Carolina, where he helped his team win the 2007 North Carolina 4A state championship. He was selected with the tenth overall pick in the 2007 MLB draft by the Giants. He and Buster Posey both made their major league debuts in 2009 and established a reputation as one of the best batteries in recent MLB history. Bumgarner pitched eight scoreless innings in Game 4 of the 2010 World Series, helping win the franchise's first World Series in San Francisco and the first since 1954. Two years later, Bumgarner pitched seven more scoreless innings in Game 2 of the 2012 World Series. In 2014, Bumgarner started the Wild Card Game, throwing a shutout against the Pittsburgh Pirates. He set the World Series record for the lowest earned run average (ERA) in 2014, with an ERA of 0.25, and took home the Most Valuable Player award as the Giants won their third World Series during his time in San Francisco.

Bumgarner won 18 games (his career-high) in 2014 and 2015, and he had a career-high 251 strikeouts in 2016. That fall, he threw his second Wild Card Game shutout, blanking the New York Mets. Injuries interrupted the first half of his next two seasons, a dirt bike accident in 2017 and a broken finger in 2018. Bumgarner led the NL in games started in 2019, with a 9–9 record. A free agent after that season, he signed a five-year, $85 million contract with the Diamondbacks. In 2021, he pitched the third complete game shutout with no hits in franchise history in a seven-inning win over the Atlanta Braves. Arizona released Bumgarner in April 2023. He had a career 134–124 record, 3.47 ERA, and 2,070 strikeouts.

== Early life ==
Madison Kyle Bumgarner was born August 1, 1989, in Hickory, North Carolina, and grew up in an area ten miles northwest nicknamed "Bumtown" because of the abundance of people with the surname Bumgarner who have lived there over the years, after their ancestors had arrived from Germany. He grew up in a log house built by his father, sleeping in a loft. At the age of four, he began playing youth baseball league, for which his father had to sign a waiver because the league was for five- to eight-year-olds. He would not let Madison throw curveballs until he was sixteen. His parents, Kevin and Debbie, divorced while Bumgarner was in high school.

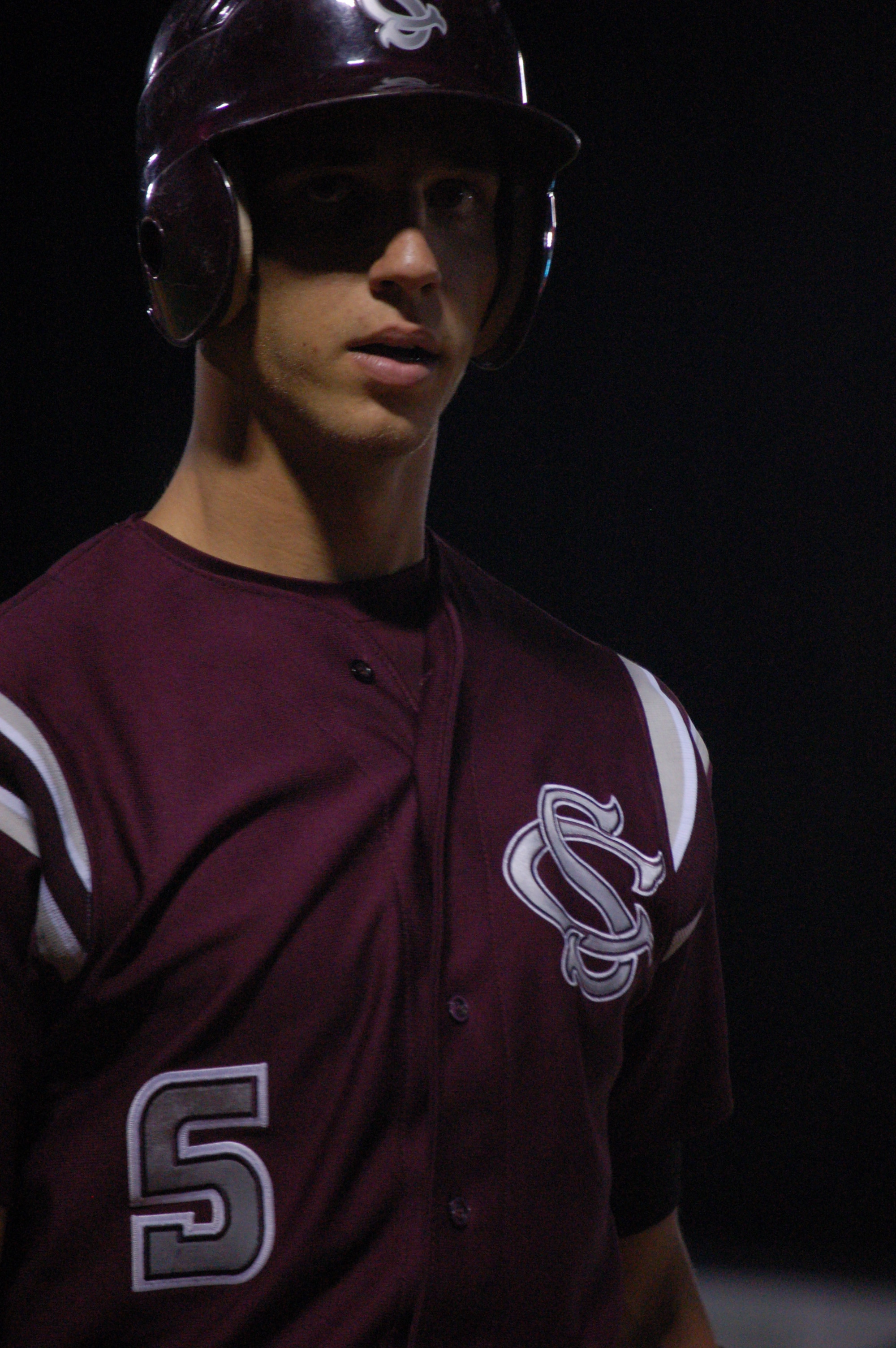
Bumgarner during a game for South Caldwell High School in 2007

Bumgarner attended South Caldwell High School in Hudson, North Carolina, where he was known as "Maddie" and played on both the school's baseball team and the Post 29's American Legion Baseball team. In his junior season, he had a 12–2 win–loss record, a 0.99 earned run average (ERA), and 120 strikeouts in 84 innings pitched, as he helped his team to a 2006 North Carolina 4A state runner-up finish. His senior season, he went 11–2 with a 1.05 ERA and 143 strikeouts in 86 innings pitched, and also had a batting average of .424 with 11 home runs and 38 runs batted in. In his final high school game, with his team ahead 8–0, Bumgarner hit a two-run inside the park home run to end the game and win the 2007 North Carolina 4A state championship. He was named most valuable player (MVP) of the playoffs and the Gatorade North Carolina Player of the Year, garnering the nickname "The Carolina Peach." Bumgarner attracted so much attention from scouts and agents in high school that his father built a wall around the bullpen at his high school field to keep them from distracting him as he warmed up. He committed to attend the University of North Carolina at Chapel Hill on a college baseball scholarship.

In 2013, the North Carolina High School Athletic Association (NCHSAA) included Bumgarner on its "100 To Remember" male athletes list, which included Michael Jordan, Carl Eller, and Jim Beatty.

== Professional career ==
=== Draft and minor leagues ===
The San Francisco Giants selected Bumgarner in the first round, with the tenth overall selection, of the 2007 MLB draft. Going into the draft, Baseball America had ranked him as the 14th-best prospect overall. He was the first high school pitcher to be selected as the Giants' first pick since Matt Cain in 2002, and the first left-handed pitcher selected in the first round by the organization since Noah Lowry in 2001. Bumgarner was also the first left-handed pitcher taken as the first pick by the organization since Mike Remlinger in 1987, the first high school left-handed pitcher the Giants drafted in the first round since Frank Riccelli in 1971, and the first high school left-handed pitcher taken as the first pick by the organization since Riccelli in 1971. In many do-overs, Bumgarner would be selected by the Tampa Bay Devil Rays as the first overall pick of the 2007 MLB re-draft.

In 2008, Baseball America ranked Bumgarner the third-best prospect in the Giants organization. Bumgarner pitched for the Augusta Greenjackets, the Giants' Low-A South Atlantic League affiliate, in 2008. The Giants had him alter the angle of his head during delivery, but after Bumgarner struggled over his first three starts in Augusta, he reverted to the way he had thrown in high school. With Augusta, he worked on his changeup, slider, and ability to throw effectively on the inside part of the plate, a critical trait for a pitcher with his side-armed delivery. He won the South Atlantic League pitchers' Triple Crown, tying for the league lead in wins (15, tied with Levi Maxwell), leading the league in ERA (1.46), and leading the league in strikeouts (164).

Before the start of the 2009 season, the magazine ranked Bumgarner as the ninth-best prospect in baseball. He began the 2009 season with the Giants' High-A affiliate, the San Jose Giants of the California League. After five starts, in which he went 3–1 with a 1.48 ERA and 23 strikeouts, he was called up to the Giants AA affiliate, the Connecticut Defenders of the Eastern League. On July 22, he hit a grand slam against Eric Niesen and picked up the victory in a 9–3 triumph over the Binghamton Mets. In 20 games (19 starts) with them, he went 9–1 with a 1.93 ERA and 69 strikeouts.

Entering 2010, Bumgarner attended the Giants' spring training before the season, competing for the position of fifth starter. He dropped to the fourteenth-best prospect in baseball on the magazine's list, as some writers were concerned about a drop in Bumgarner's velocity. Out of shape entering the new season, he struggled and was sent down to the AAA Fresno Grizzlies, partly due to his loss of velocity. In 14 starts with Fresno, he went 7–1 with a 3.16 ERA and 59 strikeouts.

June 25, 2017, the San Francisco Giants sent Bumgarner on a rehab assignment with the AZL Giants. At the Giants Baseball Complex (Scottsdale Stadium), he pitched three innings without allowing a hit against the AZL Angels. On June 30, he was sent on another rehab assignment, this one at Raley Field with the Sacramento River Cats against his former team, the Fresno Grizzlies. On July 5, the Giants sent Bumgarner on his third rehab assignment, this one with the San Jose Giants. That day at San Jose Municipal Stadium, he pitched against the Rancho Cucamonga Quakes. On July 10 at San Jose Municipal Stadium, he pitched against the Modesto Nuts, striking out eight batters and only allowing two hits.

On May 26, 2018, the Giants sent Bumgarner on a rehab assignment with the Sacramento River Cats. That day at Raley Field, in a 2–0 team win over the Albuquerque Isotopes, Bumgarner started and pitched 3 2/3 hitless and scoreless innings, throwing 47 pitches (31 strikes) and striking out eight of the 12 batters he faced. On May 31, he was sent on another rehab assignment, this one with the San Jose Giants. That day at San Jose Municipal Stadium, he pitched against the Visalia Rawhide.

=== San Francisco Giants (2009–2019) ===
==== 2009 ====
On September 8, 2009, the Giants promoted Bumgarner to the major leagues for his debut in a start against the San Diego Padres at AT&T Park that night. He started in place of ace Tim Lincecum, who was scratched with back spasms. At the age of 20 years and 38 days, he became the second-youngest pitcher ever to start a game for the Giants, older only than Mike McCormick, who started two games for the Giants—as a nineteen-year-old—in 1956, when the team was still in New York. In the bottom of the third inning with no outs, Bumgarner struck out Padres' pitcher Kevin Correia for his first career strikeout. As a rookie, Bumgarner's locker was next to that of future National Baseball Hall of Fame starting pitcher Randy Johnson in his last MLB season. Bumgarner made four appearances with the Giants in 2009, posting an ERA of 1.80 and striking out ten batters in ten innings.

==== 2010 ====
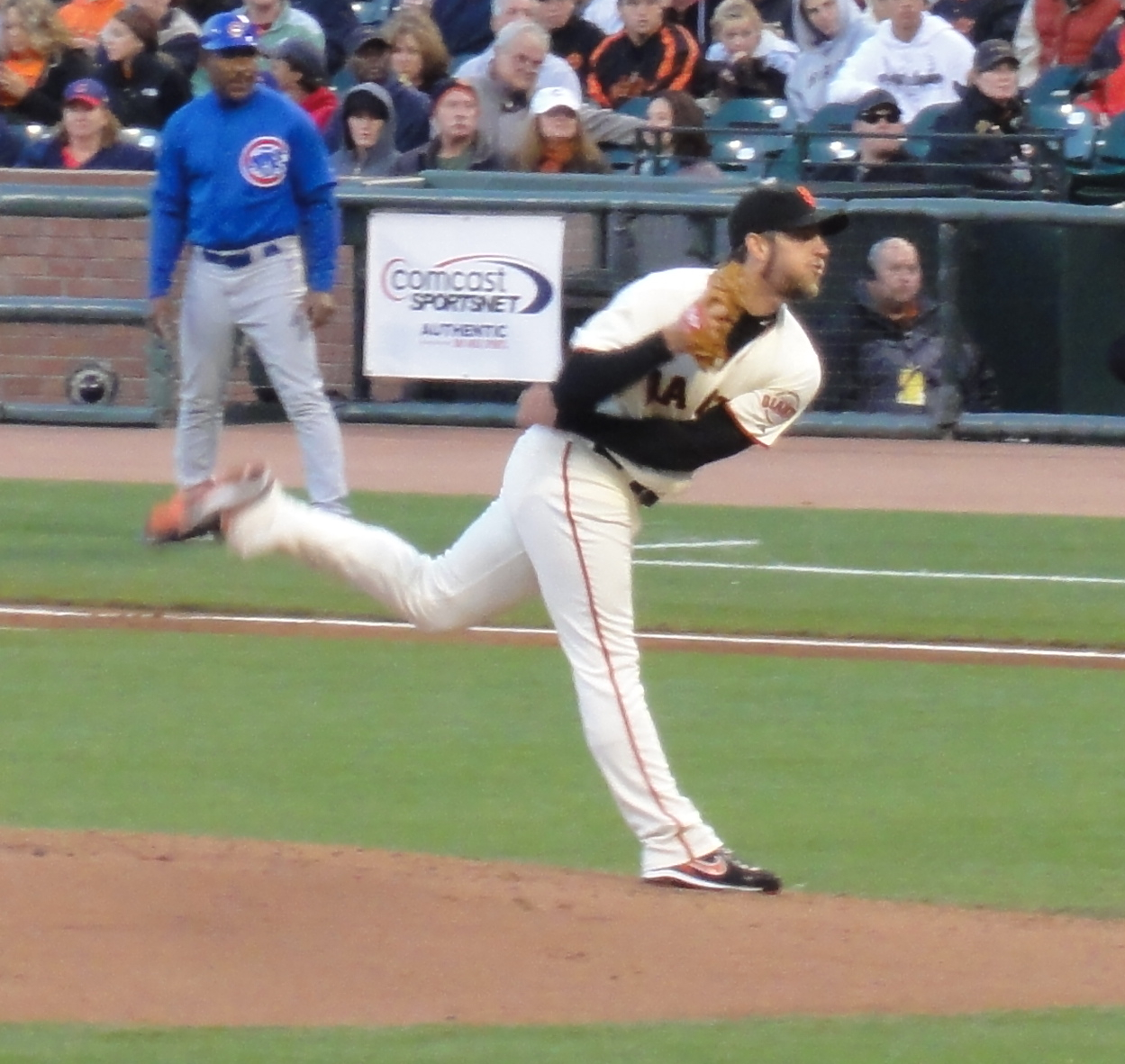
Bumgarner pitching against the Chicago Cubs in his rookie season in 2010

On June 26, 2010, Bumgarner was called up again to join the club, facing the Boston Red Sox the next day, where he registered his first career major league hit. Leading off the bottom of the fifth inning and on the first pitch he saw, Bumgarner hit a line drive single to left-center field off of pitcher Manny Delcarmen. He replaced Joe Martinez, who had made one start in place of an injured Todd Wellemeyer, in the starting rotation. The next day, Bumgarner made his first career major league pinch-hitting appearance.

On July 6 at Miller Park, in a 6–1 win over the Milwaukee Brewers, Bumgarner earned his first major league victory by going eight innings without yielding a run. In the game, he also registered his first MLB run batted in (RBI). In the top of the sixth inning and leading 4–0, Bumgarner hit an RBI single through second and first base off of pitcher Randy Wolf, scoring center fielder Aaron Rowand and moving first baseman Travis Ishikawa to third base.

Bumgarner pitched well enough that when Wellemeyer returned from the disabled list in August, Giants Manager Bruce Bochy chose to use Wellemeyer in the bullpen and leave Bumgarner in the rotation.

In five September starts during the Giants' successful run to the National League (NL) West championship, Bumgarner posted an earned run average (ERA) of 1.13. At the end of September, Bumgarner earned his first win at home, making him 7–6 on the season. In 18 starts, Bumgarner finished his rookie season with a win–loss record of 7–6, a 3.00 ERA, and 86 strikeouts. After the season, he was named a starting pitcher on Baseball America's 2010 All-Rookie Team.

Bumgarner was the number four starting pitcher in the team's postseason rotation, behind Lincecum, Cain, and Sánchez. It is the only postseason starting rotation where every starter (minimum of four) pitched at least one complete game no-hit shutout at some point in their careers. The Giants played against the wild card in the NL Division Series (NLDS). On October 11 at Turner Field, in a 3–2 win over the Atlanta Braves, his childhood team, Bumgarner made his postseason debut in Game 4 of the series, striking out five and pitching six innings to advance the Giants to the NL Championship Series (NLCS). He became the youngest pitcher in franchise history to appear in, start, and win a playoff game. He was also the sixth-youngest pitcher to appear in a playoff game. On October 23 at Citizens Bank Park, in a 3–2 win over the NL East champion Philadelphia Phillies, in Game 6 of the NLCS, Bumgarner made his first career postseason relief appearance, relieving Jeremy Affeldt and pitching two shutout innings in the fifth and sixth. The Giants won the game to advance to the World Series. On October 31 at Rangers Ballpark in Arlington, in a 4–0 win over the American League (AL) champion Texas Rangers, Bumgarner made his World Series debut, becoming the fifth-youngest pitcher to start a World Series game. In Game 4 of the World Series, Bumgarner and Buster Posey were the first rookie battery to start a World Series game since Spec Shea and Yogi Berra in 1947. Bumgarner pitched eight shutout innings and struck out six batters, including designated hitter and future Hall of Famer Vladimir Guerrero three times. Bumgarner walked two while allowing only three hits and permitting just one Ranger to reach second base, winning his first career World Series game.

He became the first NL rookie starting pitcher to pitch five scoreless innings in a World Series game since John Stuper of the St. Louis Cardinals in Game 6 of the 1982 World Series against the Brewers. Bumgarner had a chance to become the first rookie pitcher to throw a complete game shutout in a World Series game since the Cleveland Indians' Gene Bearden blanked the Boston Braves 2–0 in Game 3 of the 1948 World Series, but Bumgarner had already thrown 106 pitches. Instead, he turned the ball over to the closer Brian Wilson, who led the majors that season with a franchise record-tying 48 saves and finished Game 4. Fox Sports play-by-play commentator Joe Buck said it was "One of the best pitching performances we've seen in a World Series in a long time certainly from a rookie." Color commentator Tim McCarver said "We talked about [Tim] Lincecum. We talked about [Matt] Cain. We talked about [Jonathan] Sánchez. The number four starter for the San Francisco Giants won't be number four for long." At 21 years and 91 days old, Bumgarner became the fourth youngest pitcher in major league history all-time to win a World Series game. He was named the Ram Power Player of the Game. Bumgarner's 2.18 ERA in the postseason is the second lowest all-time by a rookie, second to Babe Adams' 1.33 ERA with the 1909 Pittsburgh Pirates. This win gave the Giants a 3–1 lead in the series, en route to the Giants winning their first World Series championship in 56 years since the 1954 World Series—and their first title in 52 years in San Francisco. It was their sixth World Series championship title in franchise history. On November 3, the Giants celebrated their first World Series victory parade in San Francisco. "When you talk about the 2010 team, to me, the opening sentence better be about the pitching," said starting left fielder Pat Burrell.

==== 2011 ====
On April 8 at AT&T Park, before the team's home opener against the eventual World Series Champion St. Louis Cardinals, the Giants raised their first World Series championship flag during a pregame ceremony. On April 9 at AT&T Park, during another pregame ceremony, the team received their World Series rings before their game against the St. Louis Cardinals.

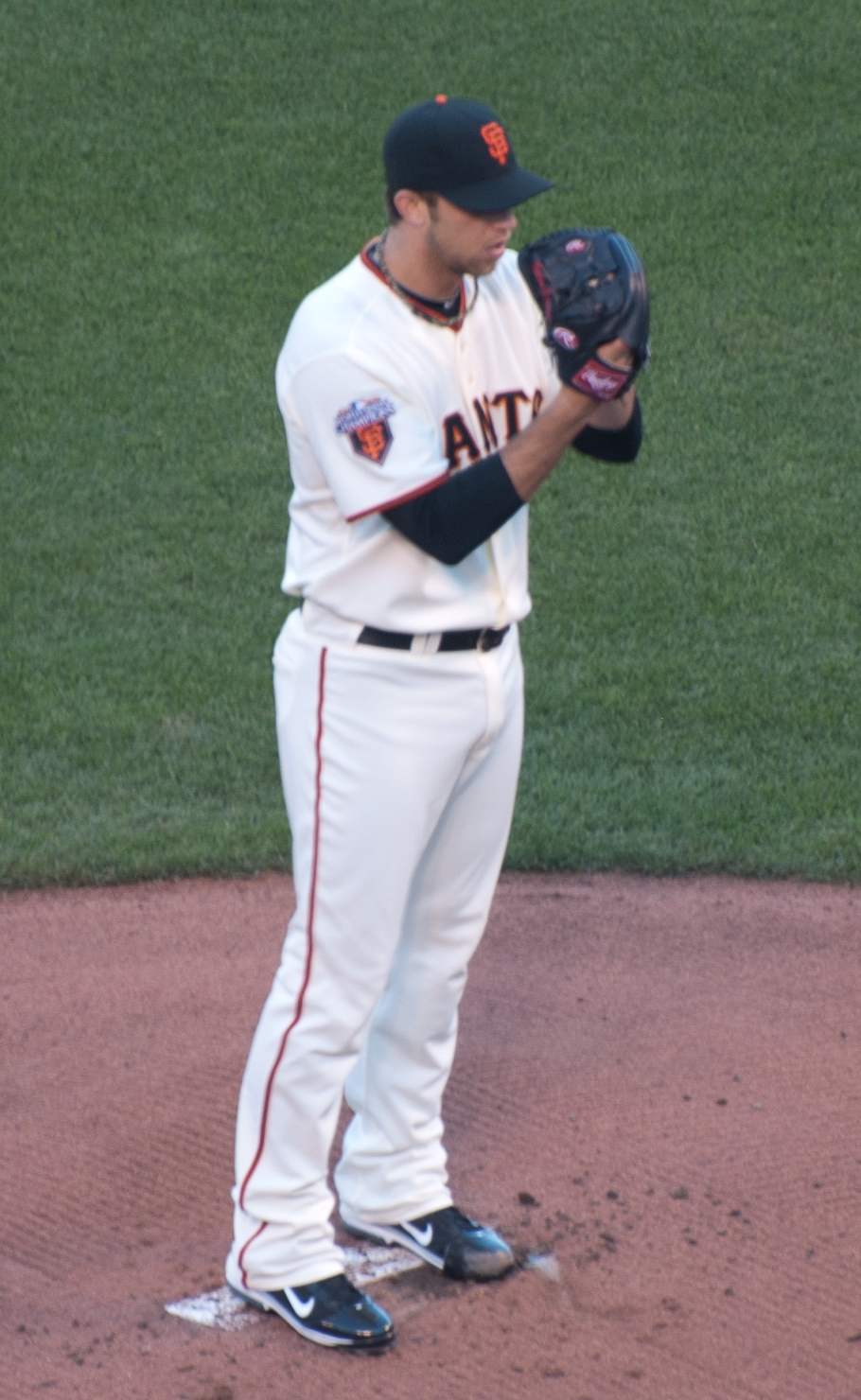
Bumgarner in June 2011

On April 11 at AT&T Park, against the Los Angeles Dodgers, Bumgarner got former teammate Juan Uribe to strike out swinging in the top of the second inning for his 100th career strikeout. Bumgarner was 0–5 with a 4.58 ERA in his first seven starts of the 2011 season. Despite pitching at least six innings and giving up more than one earned run only once in his five starts from April 27 through May 19, 2011, it was not until the 19th that he got his first win, collecting an ERA of 3.71 for the season at that point.

On May 19, 2011, at Dodger Stadium, in a 3–1 win over the Los Angeles Dodgers, Bumgarner pitched 8 2/3 innings before allowing a run in the ninth inning, nearly throwing his first career shutout and outdueling 2009 All-Star pitcher Chad Billingsley. He threw a career-high 89 strikes on the outing.

By June 9, Bumgarner had a 1.93 ERA over his last nine starts, yet had two wins and five losses to show for it. In seven of his eight losses at that point, the Giants either only scored once or scored no times at all.

On September 5, Bumgarner struck out thirteen batters while yielding two earned runs, seven hits and one walk over 8 1/3 innings while earning the win against the Padres. It was his second consecutive double digit strikeout game, having struck out eleven Cubs batters in his previous start against the Chicago Cubs. With his win September 16, Bumgarner won five consecutive starts; he finished the season 13–13 with a 3.21 ERA, 204 innings pitched, and 191 strikeouts. Bumgarner was 12–1 for the games in which his teammates scored three or more runs. Bumgarner finished eleventh in voting for the NL Cy Young Award.

==== 2012 ====
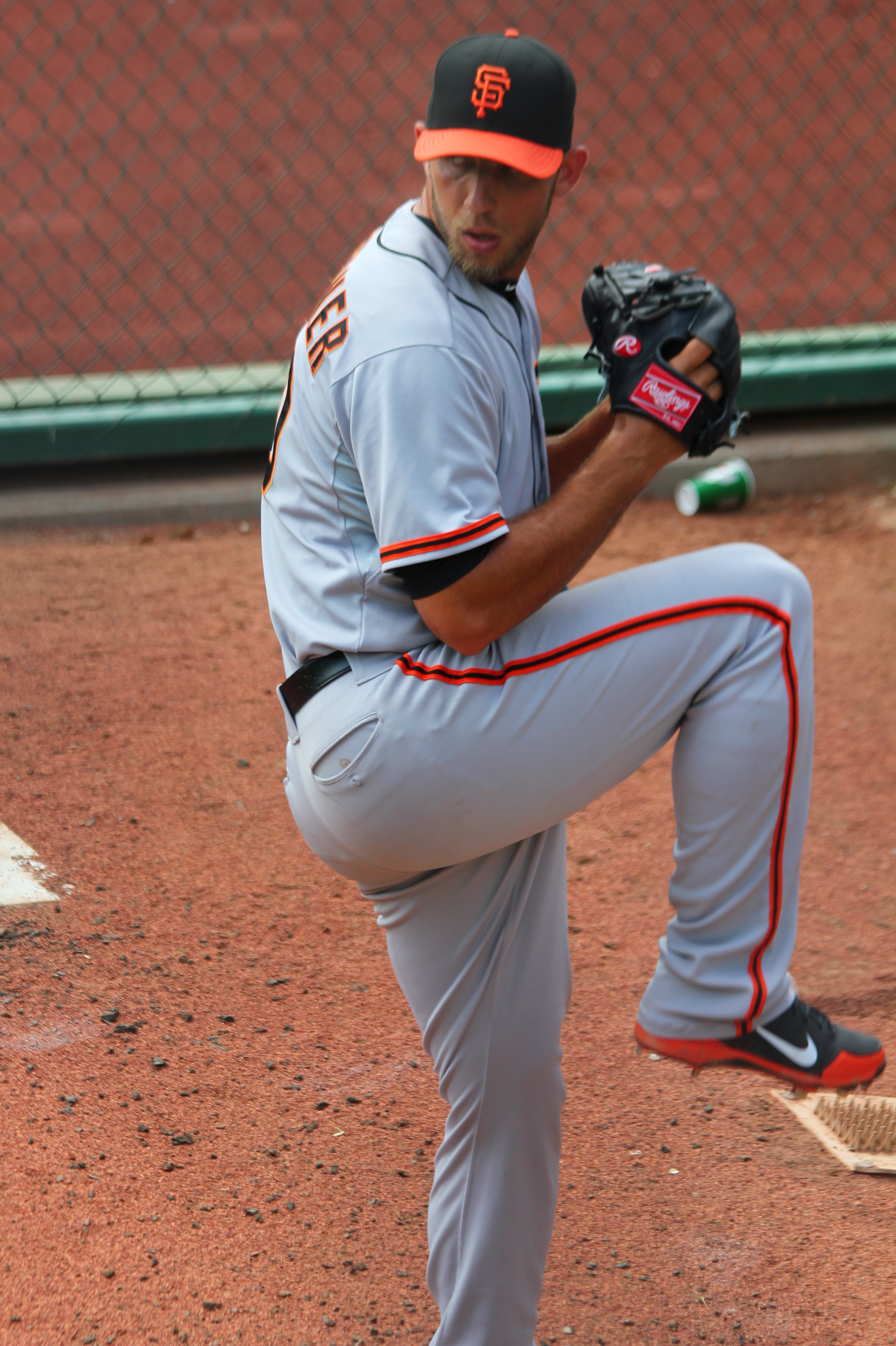
Bumgarner tossing in the bullpen at PNC Park in 2012

On April 16, 2012, Bumgarner and the Giants agreed to a six-year contract extension worth $35.56 million through the 2017 season. The contract included additional $12 million options for 2018 and 2019. When Bumgarner made his usual call to his mom, Debbie, who had heard about the signing from media reports, she had to coax it out of him during their conversation because he did not tell her. Bumgarner began the season by going 5–1 with a 2.31 ERA.

On June 12 at AT&T Park, in a 6–3 win over the Houston Astros, Bumgarner hit his first career Major League home run and also struck out twelve batters. Leading off the bottom of the third inning, Bumgarner hit a flyball off of pitcher Bud Norris to deep left field and into the bleachers, making the score 1–0. Since May 14, the Giants had played 16 home games without hitting a homerun. Upon entering the dugout, he just played along as his teammates gave him the "cold shoulder" that did not last long before congratulating him. Bumgarner became the most recent Giants pitcher to hit a home run and strikeout 10 or more batters in a game since Mike Krukow, who was, of course, announcing the game. The next day, fellow rotation mate Matt Cain pitched the 22nd perfect game in Major League history. On June 28 at AT&T Park, in a 5–0 win over the Cincinnati Reds, Bumgarner pitched both his first career regular-season complete game, shutout, and one-hitter. Bumgarner struck out eight and walked two batters. He started the game by only walking two batters and pitching five no-hit innings. The bid ended in the top of the sixth inning, when starting catcher Ryan Hanigan singled on the first pitch he saw on a ground ball through the hole at short (Brandon Crawford) and second (Ryan Theriot) to center field (Ángel Pagán). With this victory, it marked the first time in franchise history with four straight shutouts and established a new San Francisco record of 36 consecutive scoreless innings. The losing pitcher was future rotation mate Johnny Cueto.

On September 22 at AT&T Park, in an 8–4 win, Bumgarner pitched 5 2/3 innings and struck out six batters to get the win as the Giants clinched their spot in the playoffs. Winning their sixth straight game, the Giants won the National League West Division championship for the second time in three years in a game over the San Diego Padres. Bumgarner finished the year with a 16–7 record while posting a 3.37 ERA and striking out 191 batters in 208 1/3 innings.

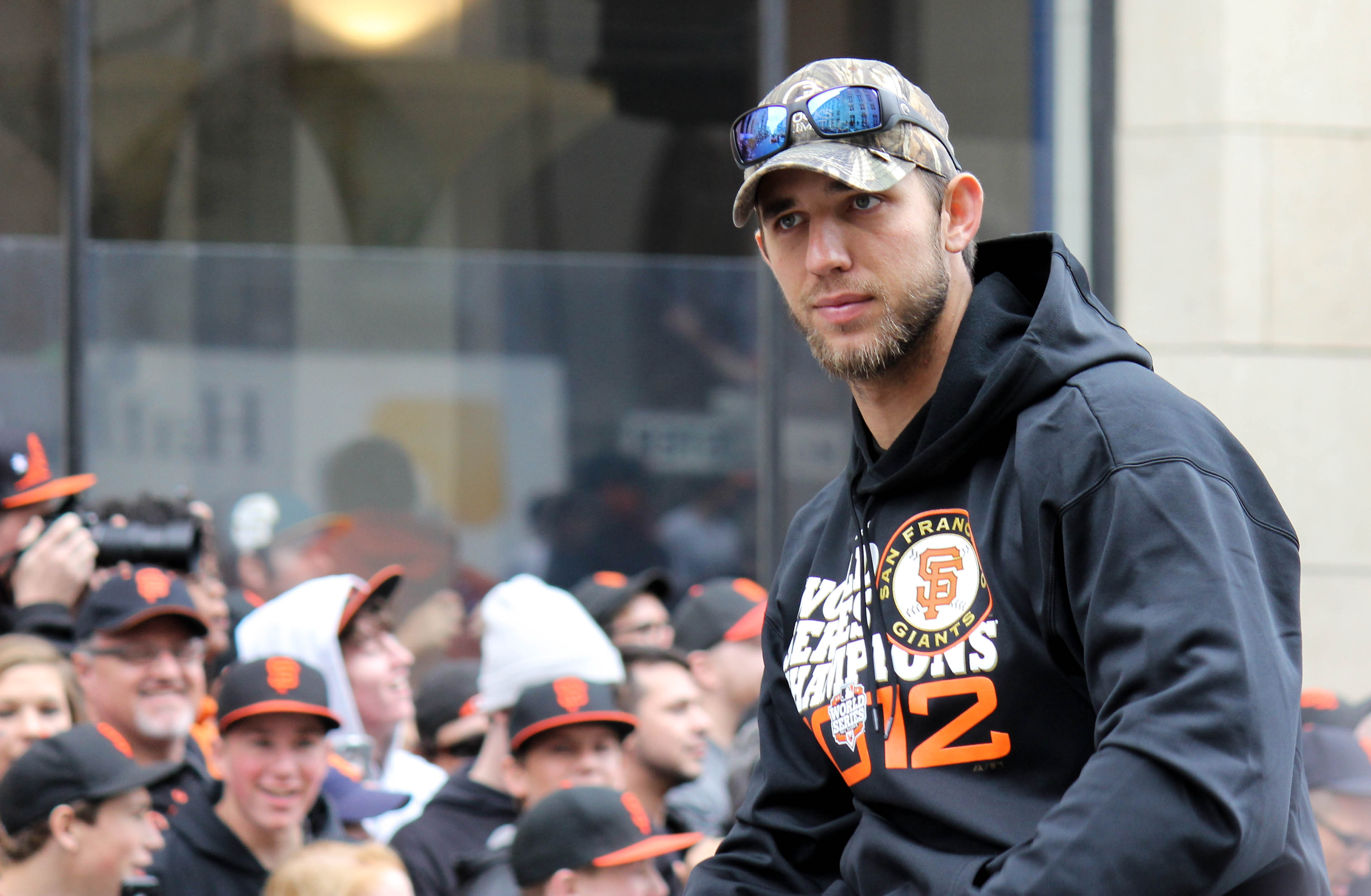
Bumgarner in the 2012 World Series parade

On October 25 at AT&T Park, in a 2–0 win over the American League (AL) champion Detroit Tigers in Game 2 of the World Series, at the age of 23, Bumgarner pitched seven scoreless innings, striking out eight batters and yielding only two hits. Bumgarner became the first pitcher to begin his World Series career with fifteen scoreless innings since Bruce Hurst in 1986. Hall of Famer Christy Mathewson in 1905 was the last Giant before Bumgarner to have scoreless outings in his first two career World Series starts. The Giants swept the Series for their second title in the last three seasons. It was their seventh World Series championship title in franchise history. On October 31, the Giants held another World Series victory parade but this time on Halloween.

==== 2013 ====
Bumgarner began the season as the number two starting pitcher. In his first start of 2013 on April 2 at Dodger Stadium, in a 2–0 win over the Los Angeles Dodgers, Bumgarner threw eight shutout innings and added an RBI. In the top of the seventh inning, Bumgarner knocked in first baseman Joaquín Arias on a fielder's choice by the shortstop. On April 5 at AT&T Park, before the team's home opener against the eventual National League Champion St. Louis Cardinals, the Giants raised their second World Series championship flag during a pregame ceremony. On April 7 at AT&T Park, during another pregame ceremony, the team received their World Series rings before their game against the St. Louis Cardinals. On April 19 at AT&T Park, Bumgarner got Yonder Alonso to strikeout swinging in the top of the fourth inning for his 500th career strikeout.

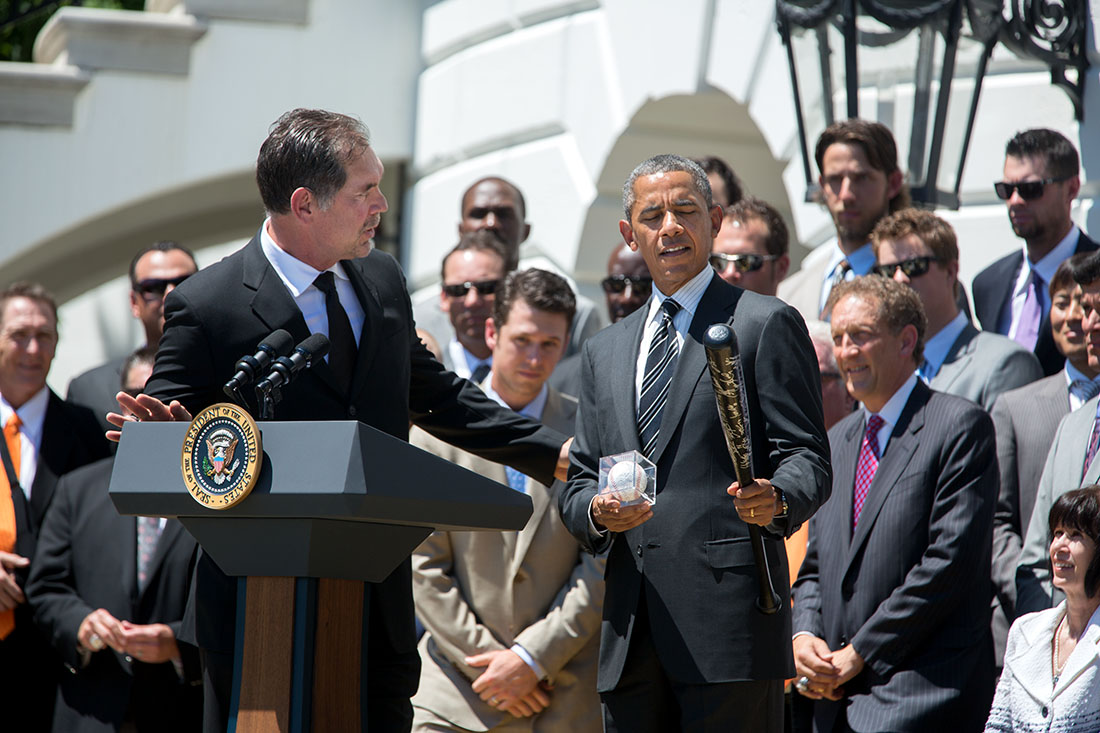
Bumgarner with the Giants on the South Lawn outside of the White House in 2013

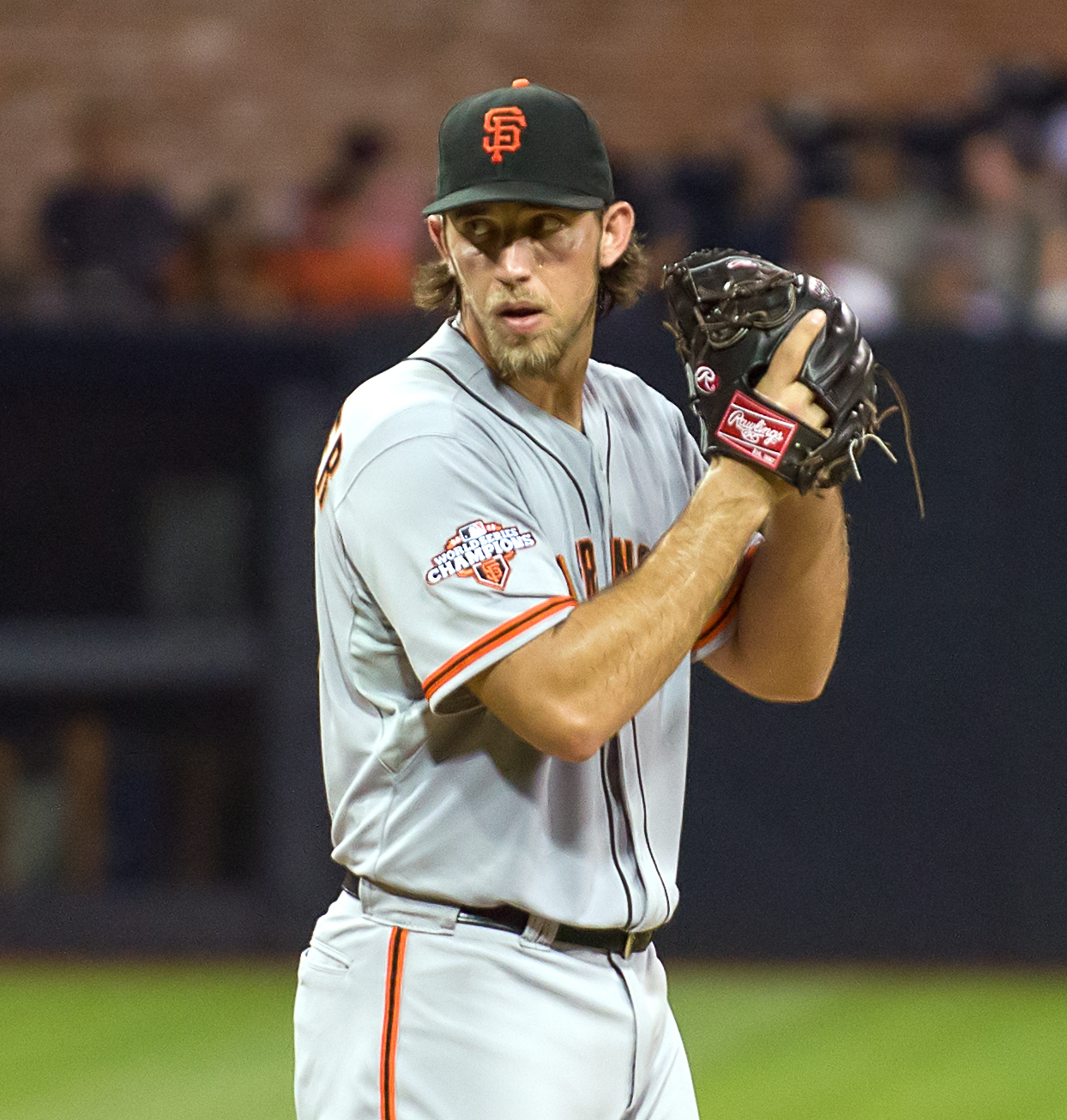
Bumgarner pitching in September 2013

Against the Braves on May 11, Bumgarner had a season-high 11 strikeouts, picking up the win in a 10–1 victory. Bumgarner was selected to represent the National League for the 2013 Major League Baseball All-Star Game, his first career All-Star selection. Though on the roster, he was not used in the NL's 3–0 loss to the AL.

On July 27, Bumgarner held the Cubs scoreless for eight innings but received a no-decision in a 1–0 loss. He matched his season-high in strikeouts with 11 on August 2 in a 4–1 victory over the Tampa Bay Rays.

Bumgarner set career bests for ERA (2.77), walks plus hits per inning pitched (WHIP) (1.03) and strikeouts (199) in 31 starts, finishing with a 13–9 record. He threw over two hundred innings for the third consecutive season (201 1/3) and improved at holding runners on base, conceding eight stolen bases in 2013 as opposed to 27 in 2012. Bumgarner finished in ninth place in voting for the NL Cy Young Award.

==== 2014: World Series MVP ====
On February 25, 2014, at Scottsdale Stadium, Bochy announced that he named Bumgarner as their Opening Day starting pitcher. On March 31, 2014, at Chase Field, in a 9–8 team win over the Arizona Diamondbacks, Bumgarner made the first Opening Day start of his career.

On April 11 at AT&T Park, in a 6–5 win over the Colorado Rockies, Bumgarner hit his first career MLB grand slam and registered a career-high five runs batted in. Trailing 3–2 in the bottom of the fourth inning and on the first pitch he saw from pitcher Jorge De La Rosa, Bumgarner hit a fly ball into the left field bleachers, clearing the bases. Left fielder Michael Morse, second baseman Brandon Hicks, shortstop Brandon Crawford, and Bumgarner all crossed home plate. Bumgarner celebrated by blowing his nose, which has led to his other nickname "Snot Rocket." Bumgarner almost hit a home run earlier in the bottom of the third inning. It ended up being a fly ball sacrifice fly to deep left field that scored Crawford.

For the first time in his major league career, Bumgarner was named NL Pitcher of the Month for May after going 5–0 in six starts, with 48 strikeouts and a 2.08 ERA. He represented the NL at the MLB All-Star Game, his second straight All-Star selection. However, Bumgarner was unavailable to pitch in the All-Star Game because he pitched two days prior to the event. Giants starting pitcher and friend Tim Hudson was named as Bumgarner's replacement. On July 13, in an 8–4 win over the Arizona Diamondbacks at AT&T Park, Posey and Bumgarner each hit grand slams, marking the first time that they both hit home runs in the same game and the first time in MLB history that batterymates both hit grand slams in the same game. Trailing 1–0 in the bottom of the fifth inning, Posey hammered and launched a line drive off of pitcher Vidal Nuño III to deep left field and into the bleachers, clearing the bases. Bumgarner, right fielder Hunter Pence, and third baseman Pablo Sandoval all scored, greeting and high-fiving Posey as he ran crossing home plate. Leading 4–1 in the bottom of the sixth inning and on the first pitch he saw from pitcher Matt Stites, Bumgarner hit a line drive deep down the left field line and into the bleachers, clearing the bases. First baseman Joaquín Arias, second baseman Ehire Adrianza, and Crawford all high-fived Bumgarner after touching home plate.

Comcast SportsNet Bay Area sportscaster Dave Flemming broadcast on live television "that first pitch... on the way, and Bumgarner does! And sends one to deep left FIELD, it's gone! My goodness! His second one of the year, he's going to the All-Star Game, put him in the lineup." "Or at least put him in the Home Run Derby," replied Krukow. Bumgarner also tied the all-time MLB records for grand slams in a career and in a single season by a pitcher with two. Tony Cloninger had been the last pitcher to hit two grand slams in one season, doing so in one game on July 3, 1966.

On August 26 at AT&T Park, in a 3–0 win over the Colorado Rockies, Bumgarner pitched his second career complete game one-hit shutout, which included pitching seven perfect innings to start the game. In the process, he set a franchise-record sixth career game with ten or more strikeouts and no walks. Bumgarner was named the NL Pitcher of the Month for August. He went 4–1 with a 1.57 ERA, threw three complete games, and had 56 strikeouts against just three walks.

On September 12 at AT&T Park, in a 9–0 win over the Dodgers, Bumgarner became the fifth left-handed pitcher in franchise history to strikeout over two hundred batters in a season. Former teammate and starting third baseman Juan Uribe was leading off the top of the seventh inning and, on three pitches, Bumgarner struck him out swinging on a slow curveball, for his 207th strikeout of the season. He broke Ray Sadecki's mark from 1968, setting a new Giants single-season strikeout record by a left-handed pitcher. On September 25 at AT&T Park, in the team's 9–8 comeback win over the San Diego Padres, the Giants clinched a Wild Card berth. Every year the Giants won the World Series, they secured a playoff spot by defeating the San Diego Padres. Fellow pitcher Lincecum also won his 100th career game that night. On September 26 at AT&T Park, before a home game against the San Diego Padres, Bumgarner was named the 2014 Willie Mac Award winner during a pregame ceremony.

Bumgarner set a career high in wins with 18, posting an 18–10 record, a 2.98 ERA, and 219 strikeouts for the regular season. He finished fourth in voting for the NL Cy Young Award, behind Clayton Kershaw, Johnny Cueto, and Adam Wainwright.

The Giants reached the postseason for the third time in Bumgarner's career, this time as a wild card team. On October 1 at PNC Park, in an 8–0 win over the Pittsburgh Pirates, Bumgarner pitched a four-hit shutout while striking out a playoff career-high 10 batters in the NL Wild Card Game, his first career postseason shutout, allowing the Giants to advance to the NLDS against the NL East champion Washington Nationals. He joined Sandy Koufax from the 1965 World Series and Justin Verlander from the 2012 ALDS as the only pitchers to pitch a shutout and strike out ten or more batters in a winner-take-all game. Giants sportscaster Jon Miller commented "Bumgarner, [is] starting to build, a postseason legend, I think." On October 6 at AT&T Park, in Game 3 of the NLDS, he struck out six but gave up three runs (two earned) in seven innings but suffered the loss in a 4–1 defeat. The loss was the only one for the Giants in the series, as they defeated the Nationals the next day in Game 4 to advance to the NLCS against the Cardinals. On October 11 at Busch Stadium, in a 3–0 win over the St. Louis Cardinals, Bumgarner threw 7 2/3 shutout innings while striking out seven in Game 1 of the NLCS, setting a major league postseason record with 26 2/3 consecutive postseason scoreless innings on the road, breaking the ninety-year-old record held by fellow Giant Art Nehf. On October 16 at AT&T Park, in Game 5, he struck out five and limited the Cardinals to three runs in eight innings but left with the game tied. However, Travis Ishikawa hit a walk-off home run in the ninth to win the game 6–3 and clinch the Giants' five-game victory over the Cardinals. Bumgarner was named the NLCS MVP.

In the World Series, the Giants faced the AL champion Kansas City Royals. With the starting rotation's regular season win-loss record posted by Jake Peavy (7–13), Hudson (9–13), and Ryan Vogelsong (8–13), the Giants became the first World Series team to have more than one starter four or more games under a .500 winning percentage. On October 21 at Kauffman Stadium, in a 7–1 win in Game 1 of the World Series, Bumgarner struck out five batters and at one point retired 12 straight batters. With two outs in the bottom of the seventh inning and on a 1-2 pitch, his 104th total pitch, catcher Salvador Perez hit a solo fly ball home run into the Royals left field bullpen with fireworks going off. He allowed only one walk and run and three hits in seven innings on 106 pitches, ending his consecutive scoreless innings on the road streak at 32 2/3 innings. This was his first allowed since Game 4 of the 2010 NLDS. His World Series straight scoreless inning streak snapped at 21 innings pitched to begin his World Series pitching career. It was the only earned run allowed by Bumgarner in his World Series career. Bumgarner was willing to pitch in Game 4 but Bochy started him in Game 5. On October 26 at AT&T Park, in a 5–0 win in Game 5 of the World Series, Bumgarner pitched his second career postseason complete-game shutout on the postseason, another four-hit shutout, that put the Giants up three games to two in the Series. He became the second pitcher in franchise history with two shutouts in a single postseason after Mathewson's three shutouts in the 1905 World Series and the first San Francisco pitcher to throw a complete-game shutout in a World Series game since Jack Sanford in Game 2 of the 1962 World Series. In addition, according to Fox Sports, Bumgarner is the fourth left-handed pitcher with at least two shutouts in a single postseason, joining Hall of Famers Whitey Ford, Sandy Koufax, and former teammate Randy Johnson. This was the first complete game shutout by a pitcher in a World Series game since the Florida Marlins' Josh Beckett in the clinching Game 6 of the 2003 World Series over the New York Yankees at Yankee Stadium. This was also the first by a left-handed pitcher since Johnson in Game 2 of the 2001 World Series over the New York Yankees at Bank One Ballpark. Since the installment of division play in 1969, Bumgarner is the fourth pitcher to throw multiple complete game shutouts in a single postseason, along with Orel Hershiser, Beckett, and Johnson. Bumgarner set the all-time MLB record for lowest career World Series ERA (0.29) among pitchers of at least twenty-five innings pitched and three starts, breaking Jack Billingham's previous record of 0.36 in 25 1/3 innings pitched. The National Baseball Hall of Famer with the lowest career World Series earned run average is Babe Ruth's 0.87 in 31 innings pitched, which ranks fifth all-time. Bumgarner would lower his record to 0.25 two days later. Bumgarner was also the first pitcher in World Series history to pitch a shutout with at least eight strikeouts and no walks. He threw 117 pitches. The last question asked by Fox Sports reporter Ken Rosenthal on the night in a live postgame interview was if he would be available if there is a game seven. When asked, Bumgarner replied "You know it. Always."

"Salvador Perez... the 2-2 - Popped up! [Pablo] Sandoval! In foul territory... GIANTS WIN! A World Series win for the San Francisco Giants, for the third time in the last five years! And their hero, Madison Bumgarner!"

— Joe Buck's final television call on Fox of the final out of the 2014 World Series clincher

"Madison Bumgarner trying to wrap up this World Series for the Giants. He's ready. He throws, swing and a POP-UP! [Pablo] Sandoval down the line in foul ground, he's got plenty of room, and he's got it! And the Giants have won; they have won the World Series for the third time in five years. And Madison Bumgarner has firmly etched his name on the all-time World Series record books as one of the greatest World Series pitchers the game has ever seen!"

— Jon Miller's final radio call on KNBR of the final out of the 2014 World Series clincher

Bumgarner let Bochy know that he could be available to pitch Game 6 or 7 in any capacity. On October 28 at Kauffman Stadium, the Giants lost Game 6 10–0, forcing a Game 7. After the game, when asked how many pitches he might be able to throw tomorrow night, Bumgarner said "Maybe 200?" On October 29 at Kauffman Stadium, before Game 7 of the World Series, Bumgarner sat and stood in the outfield with fellow starter Jake Peavy discussing the game plan strategy. Bumgarner said Hudson would pitch a few innings, hand the ball over to himself, and then he would hand it off to the bullpen. Peavy instantly countered and predicted that Bumgarner would not have to come out and that he would finish the championship. Reliever Jeremy Affeldt, who relieved Hudson, pitched a scoreless bottom of the fourth. The bullpen gates opened and Bochy and the Giants brought in Bumgarner on two days' rest to protect their one-run 3–2 lead in the bottom of the fifth. This was Bumgarner's first appearance out of the bullpen since Game 6 of the 2010 NLCS, when he also relieved Affeldt. After allowing a leadoff single to begin the inning by second baseman Omar Infante, whom the Giants defeated in a series during their three World Series championship runs, Bumgarner retired 14 batters in a row. The game ended in dramatic fashion when, with two outs in the bottom of the ninth inning, left fielder Alex Gordon lined an 87 mph (140 km/h) slider to left center field. Center fielder Gregor Blanco misplayed the ball, and it rolled to the wall. Left fielder Juan Pérez had trouble grabbing the ball, which allowed Gordon to reach third base as the potential tying run, on a base hit and error combination. With the tying run 90 feet (27 m) away and the winning run at the plate, Bumgarner was continually "climbing the ladder" with Posey, who was half-squatting and nearly standing. Bumgarner threw six pitches to Perez, inducing a foul pop up fly ball, which was caught by third baseman and free agent to-be Pablo Sandoval to end the game, Series, and baseball season. The win made the Giants the first visiting team since the 1979 Pittsburgh Pirates to win Game 7 of the World Series, continuing their "Even-Year Magic," a trend of clinching World Series titles while on the road, having done so at Globe Life Park in Arlington in 2010 and Comerica Park in 2012. Bumgarner was initially credited with the win, which would have given him a 3–0 record in the series, the first since Randy Johnson in the 2001 World Series. However, following deliberation among the official scorers, it was decided that Affeldt by rule was entitled to the win. Bumgarner pitched five scoreless innings in relief, striking out four batters while allowing only two hits and zero walks on 68 pitches. Preserving a one-run lead, he earned his first career save, regular season or postseason. This was also the longest save in any postseason game, a winner-take-all game, and World Series history. Bumgarner, at the age of 25, and the Giants won their third title in the last five seasons. It was their eighth World Series championship title in franchise history.

Upon being named the World Series MVP, the Commissioner of Baseball Bud Selig handed out the Commissioner's Trophy to Giants management and presented Bumgarner with the World Series MVP Award, both for the final time in his career. Selig said "You did the sport and the Giants proud." Bumgarner became the 26th pitcher and the first pitcher in Giants franchise history to win World Series MVP, finishing the Series with a 2–0 record, a 0.43 earned run average, 17 strikeouts, and walking only one batter in two starts across three pitching appearances. He also pitched a complete game shutout, recorded a save, and, in the 61 innings the Giants played in the World Series, he only gave up one run in 21 innings pitched, throwing 291 total pitches. Speaking to the media after the game at the podium with the MVP trophy at his side, Bumgarner said "Yeah, we won Game 7 of the World Series on the road. So it was definitely emotional. It's been an unbelievable year for us. So many ups and downs. We faced a lot of adversity. I couldn't be happier for my teammates. There were a lot of guys that couldn't deserve it anymore they do. Like I said, I'm thankful for them and truly an honor to be part of this team and organization."

For the 2014 postseason, Bumgarner started six games in seven pitching appearances. He posted a 4–1 win–loss record, a 1.03 earned run average (third lowest by a pitcher with a minimum of 30 innings pitched), two complete game shutouts, a save, a San Francisco Giants single postseason record 45 strikeouts, and he pitched a major league record 52 2/3 total innings in a single postseason. It was more than twice as many innings as any other pitcher who appeared in the playoffs and World Series that fall; he accounted for 32.9 percent of all innings the Giants pitched in the postseason. The previous records were Tim Lincecum's 43 strikeouts in 2010 and Bill Foster's 51 innings pitched in 1926 and Curt Schilling's 48 1/3 innings pitched in 2001. Bumgarner also threw a major league record 702 total pitches in a single postseason. Bumgarner sat down with NBC Sports Bay Area's Alex Pavlovic to reflect and reminisce on his 2014 postseason run before the 10-year reunion of the 2014 World Series championship team ceremony at Oracle Park. "Most of the second half of that season, but especially the postseason, was, that was me as good as I can be," Bumgarner said. "Everything was working perfectly. You know, people talk about the zone that [I was in], that was it." When asked if he had any idea that that would never be done again, Bumgarner answered "Probably not in the near future but who knows what's going to happen. I could never say never," he said. "Who knows what the game is going to evolve into, but I would say it's a pretty safe bet that it's not going to happen in the near future the way it's going."

For the 2014 regular season and postseason combined, in 40 appearances, Bumgarner started 39 games, the most by a Giants pitcher since Ron Bryant started 39 regular season games in 1973, according to Fox Sports. He posted a 22–11 record, and he struck out 264 batters in 270 total innings pitched. His 270 total innings pitched are the most by a Giants pitcher since Bryant's 270 in 1973.

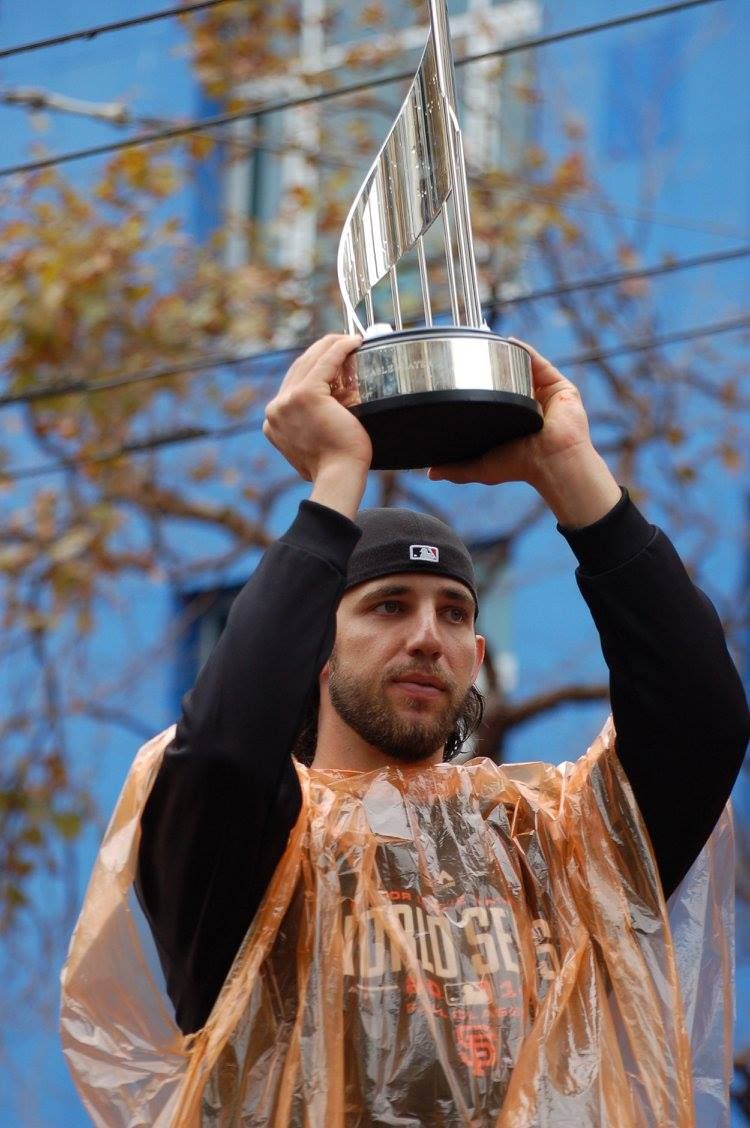
Bumgarner hoists his World Series MVP trophy during the 2014 World Series victory parade.

On October 31, the Giants held their third World Series victory parade in San Francisco, and second in three years on Halloween. "We were thinking maybe if we did the ring this year, we wouldn't even put our names on the side [of it], we just put MadBum on the side of the rings," Affeldt said.

On December 8, Bumgarner was named the Sports Illustrated Sportsman of the Year. He became the 17th person associated with MLB and the first Giant to represent the award. On December 30, he was named the Associated Press Male Athlete of the Year. He became the first MLB player since fellow Giant Barry Bonds in 2001 to win the award. He is the fourth Giant along with fellow left-handed Giants pitcher Carl Hubbell, and Willie Mays and Bonds, and is the 25th MLB player to win the award. On January 24, 2015, Bumgarner won the Babe Ruth Award given by the New York chapter of the Baseball Writers' Association of America to the most outstanding player of the postseason.

==== 2015 ====
On February 19, 2015, at Scottsdale Stadium, after watching the Giants' first workout of spring training, Bochy announced that he had named Bumgarner as their Opening Day starting pitcher again. "He's going the second game, too."

On April 6, 2015, at Chase Field, in a 5–4 win over the Arizona Diamondbacks, Bumgarner started on Opening Night and held them to one run. On April 13 at AT&T Park, before the team's home opener against the Colorado Rockies, the Giants raised their third World Series championship flag during a pregame ceremony. Giants CEO, Managing general partner, owner, and President Larry Baer convinced him to enter on a San Francisco Mounted Police horseback, something Bumgarner did not want to do, arguing with him for weeks about it, but ended up being glad he did it. Bumgarner relayed the banner to six of the nine Giants who were part of all three World Series championship teams in the past five years. They climbed into the stands to raise it up a pole matching the height of the American flag. On April 18 at AT&T Park, during another pregame ceremony, the team received their World Series rings before their game against the Arizona Diamondbacks.

On May 4, 2015, at AT&T Park, in a 2–0 win over the San Diego Padres, Bumgarner pitched 7 1/3 scoreless innings and struck out six batters. He took a no-hitter into the seventh inning, but Justin Upton spoiled it with a leadoff single. On May 21, Bumgarner became the first pitcher to hit a home run off of Kershaw, who became the second Cy Young Award winner to surrender a home run to Bumgarner, joining Zack Greinke. Bumgarner became the first reigning World Series MVP in Major League history to hit a home run off of a defending League MVP.

On June 23 at AT&T Park, Bumgarner again pitched 7 1/3 innings against the Padres. But this time, he struck out a career-high 14 batters, tying Atlee Hammaker's San Francisco Era record for the most strikeouts in a game by a left-handed pitcher. This tied for the second most strikeouts in a game by a left-handed pitcher in franchise history. This trailed only National Baseball Hall of Famer Carl Hubbell's 15. According to ESPN Stats and Info, he became the first National League pitcher to assemble a 14-strikeout, one-walk game and no decision since the Chicago Cubs' Mark Prior on September 30, 2004. Five days later, in a 6–3 win over the Colorado Rockies, Bumgarner had two hits, one a solo home run, scored twice, and struck out center fielder Brandon Barnes swinging in the top of the second inning for his 1,000th career strikeout. He became the third left-handed pitcher in the San Francisco era and the third-youngest in franchise history to reach the milestone. Only Amos Rusie (21) and Mathewson (25) were younger.

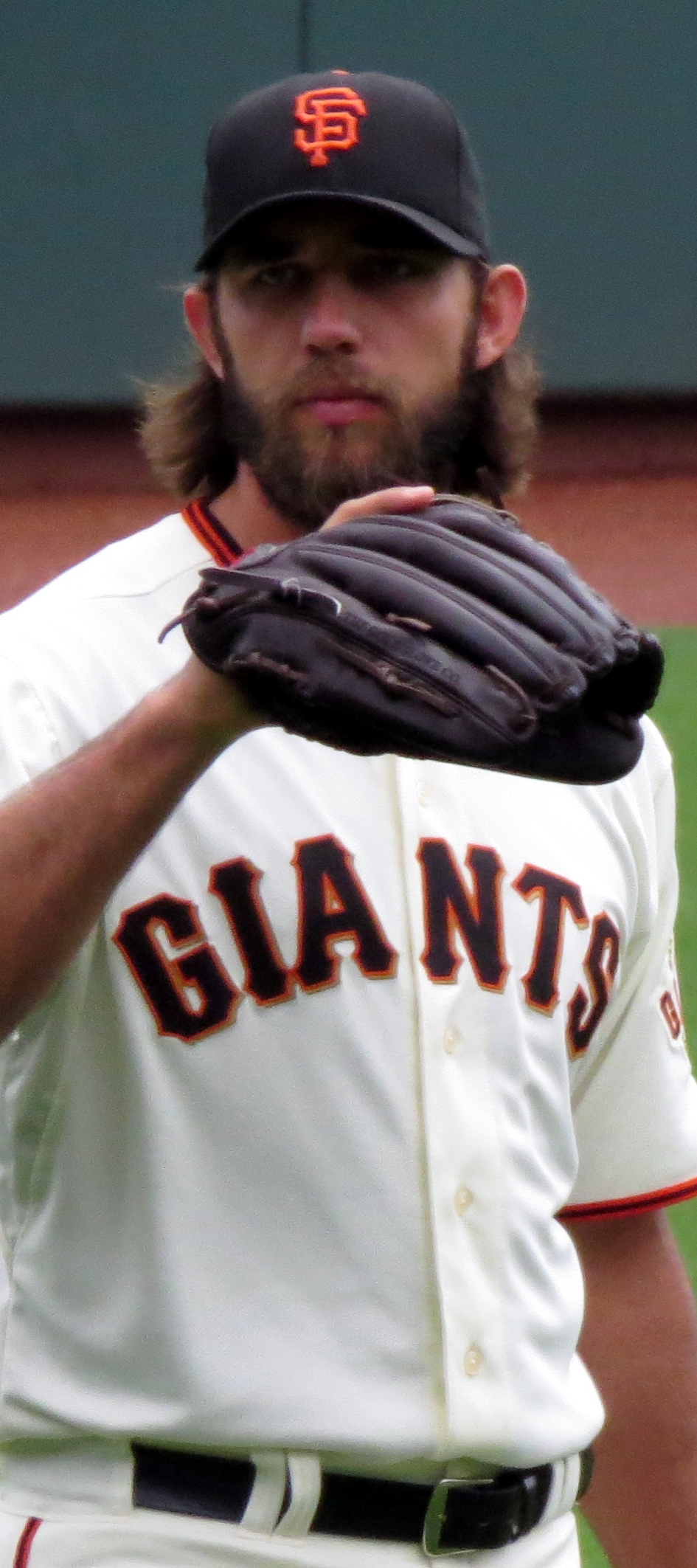
Bumgarner in 2015

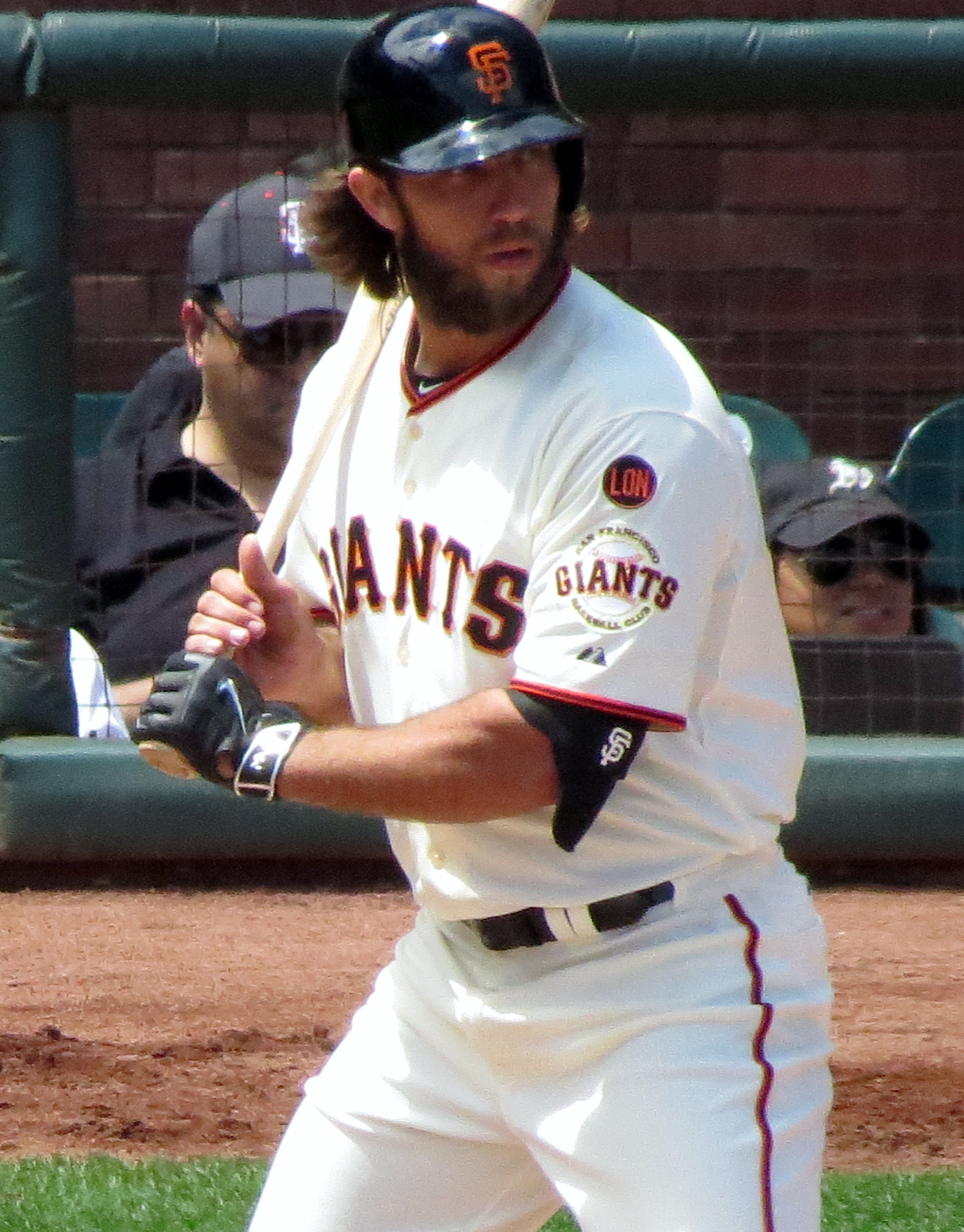
Bumgarner batting in 2015, his second Silver Slugger season

For the third year in a row, Bumgarner was part of the NL All-Star team. This time, he got to pitch in the game, throwing a scoreless fourth inning, with batterymate Posey catching him.

On August 11 at AT&T Park, in a 3–1 win over the Houston Astros, Bumgarner pitched a complete game and struck out 12 batters and walked none. During his outing, he struck out a career-high seven straight batters to tie a San Francisco record with Juan Marichal and Jonathan Sánchez. The Nationals swept the three-game series over the Giants in Washington, D.C. back in July. On August 16 at AT&T Park, in a 5–0 win over the Washington Nationals, he tied his career-high by recording 14 strikeouts, including three against Bryce Harper, who would go on to win the NL MVP award that year. Bumgarner also hit a double, hit his tenth career home run, and pitched a complete-game shutout. In the top of the fifth inning and leading 3–0, Bumgarner hit an opposite field, line drive RBI double off of starting pitcher Joe Ross to right field, scoring second baseman Kelby Tomlinson from first base. In the bottom of the seventh inning and leading 4–0, Bumgarner hit a fly ball to deep left field off of pitcher Casey Janssen for a solo home run. He is one of two pitchers in the modern era along with National Baseball Hall of Famer Early Wynn (1959) with two extra-base hits (both hitting a double and then a home run) and to strikeout 14 batters in a complete-game shutout. He became the first Giants left-handed pitcher to record multiple fourteen-strikeout games in a single season and career, and joined Marichal as the only Giants pitchers in the San Francisco era to strike out ten or more batters, hit a home run, and record a shutout in the same game. The Giants swept the four-game series over the Nationals in San Francisco. On August 17, for his exploits the week of August 10–16, Bumgarner won his first career National League Player of the Week Award. On August 18 at Busch Stadium, in a 2–0 win over the St. Louis Cardinals, Bumgarner logged his first career pinch-hit, a two-out single to left field in the top of the seventh inning off of Lance Lynn. He became the first Giants pitcher to record a hit in a pitch-hitting appearance since Kirk Rueter in 2004. On August 21 at PNC Park, in a 6–4 win over the Pittsburgh Pirates, Bumgarner hit his fifth home run, the most since Carlos Zambrano in 2006. On August 28 at AT&T Park, in a 9–1 win over the Chicago Cubs, Bumgarner struck out twelve batters through six innings, the third out of four games in which he finished with ten or more strikeouts.

On September 1, Bumgarner became the first left-handed pitcher in the live-ball era to hit five home runs and strikeout two hundred batters in a single season. On September 12 at AT&T Park, in an 8–0 win over the Padres, Bumgarner pitched his third career complete game one-hit shutout, including a career-high 7 2/3 perfect innings to start the game. He almost pitched a perfect game in consecutive seasons against a NL West team had it not been for one baserunner. On September 15, 2015, at AT&T Park, trailing 8–5 to the Cincinnati Reds in the bottom of the eighth inning, Bumgarner pinch-hit for Affeldt, batting seventh. After falling behind 0–2 in the count, Bumgarner drew a walk on seven pitches, all fastballs, in a "spirited at bat" against fellow 2015 National League All-Star pitcher Aroldis Chapman with two outs, loading the bases.

Bumgarner was scheduled to start the last game of the regular season, but with the Giants eliminated from playoff contention and his huge workload over the last two years, Bochy decided to rest him. Matt Cain got the start. Bumgarner had a chance to be the first Giants pitcher since Shawn Estes in 1997 to win 19 games in one season. Bumgarner tied a career high in wins with 18, posting an 18–9 record, a 2.93 ERA, and also set career highs with a .667 win percentage, 218 1/3 innings pitched and 234 strikeouts for the 2015 MLB regular season. His four complete games tied for the most in the Majors with five other pitchers. He was named the winner of the 2015 National League Silver Slugger Award at pitcher. Bumgarner finished in sixth place in voting for the NL Cy Young Award.

==== 2016 ====
On February 17, 2016, at Scottsdale Stadium, Bumgarner checked into spring training as the lowest-paid pitcher in the starting rotation. For the third year in a row, Bumgarner made the Opening Day start for the Giants in 2016 (April 4), lasting only five innings and allowing three runs but earning the win in a 12–3 triumph over the Milwaukee Brewers. In his next start (April 9), Bumgarner hit another home run off of Kershaw, though the Giants lost the game to the Dodgers by a score of 3–2. From April 20 to June 20, Bumgarner allowed two earned runs or fewer in 12 consecutive starts, tying Fred Anderson for the third-longest streak in Giants history since 1913.

On June 2 during the Giants last visit to Turner Field, Bumgarner became the last Giants pitcher to start and win a game at that ballpark. Bumgarner, second baseman Joe Panik, and Posey each hit two-run home runs in the top of the fifth inning, giving the Giants a trio of two-run home runs in the same inning, all on the first pitch they all saw. In the top of the fifth inning and on the first pitch he saw from pitcher Aaron Blair, Bumgarner hit a fly ball to deep left-center field and into the bleachers, scoring left fielder Gregor Blanco, who had walked before Bumgarner's at bat. On the first pitch he saw from Blair, Panik hit a fly ball to deep right field and into the bleachers, scoring center fielder Denard Span, who had walked before Panik's at bat. On the first pitch he saw from Blair, Posey hit a fly ball down the deep left field line and into the bleachers, scoring third baseman Matt Duffy, who was hit by a pitch before Posey's at bat. This was the second time in their careers that Bumgarner and Posey each hit home runs in the same game as batterymates. All of the runs scored were on three two-run home runs as the Giants won the rubber match 6–0 and the series 2–1. In recognition of his hitting ability, the Giants used him instead of a designated hitter on June 30 at the Oakland Alameda Coliseum. That was the first time a pitcher batted for himself at the beginning of a game at an AL stadium since 1976, and only the fifth time since the creation of the designated hitter rule in 1973. He went 1-for-4 with a double.

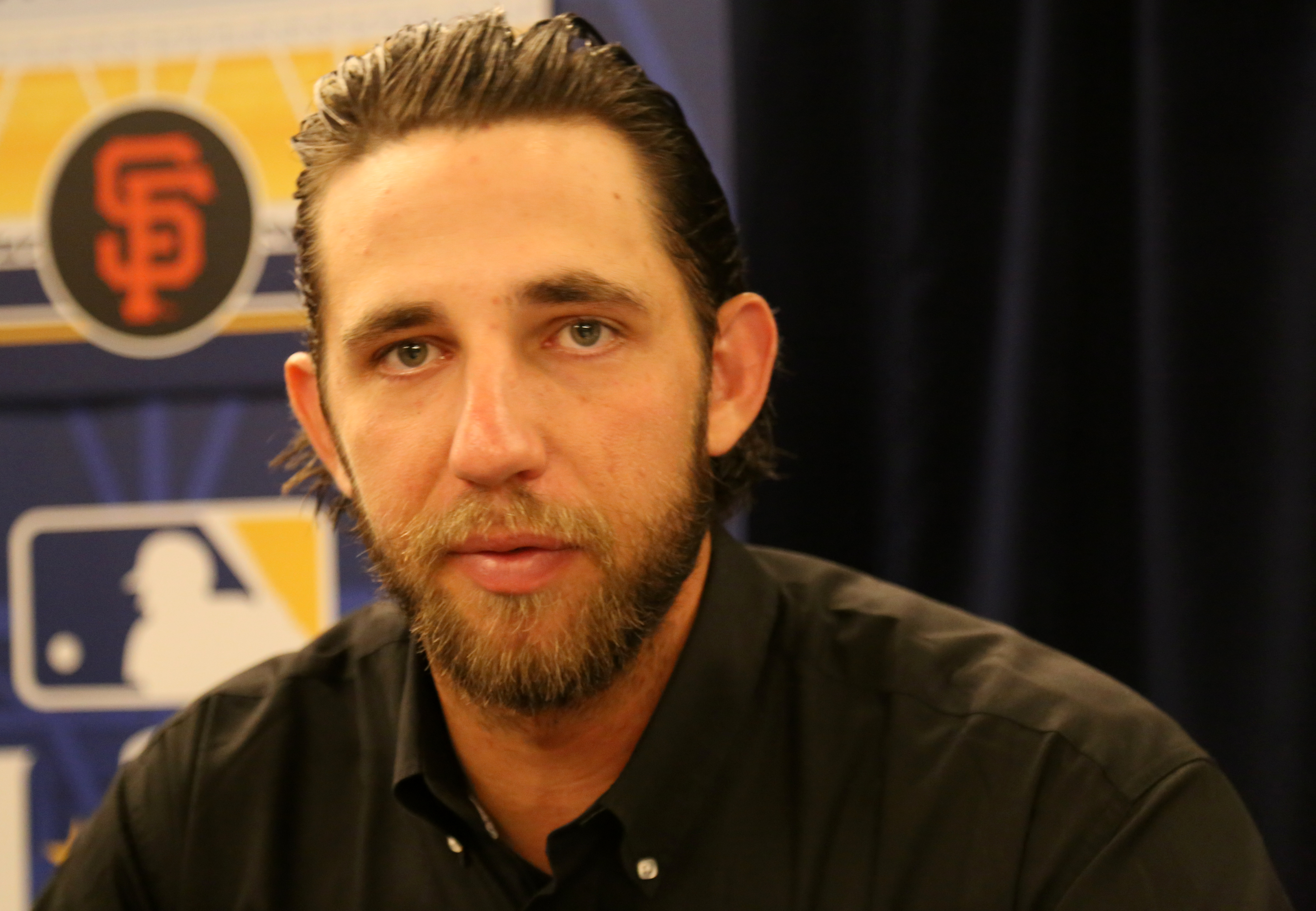
Bumgarner speaks to reporters during availability at the 2016 MLB All-Star Game

For the fourth year in a row, Bumgarner was an All-Star, though he did not pitch in the game because he had made a start two days before. At the MLB All-Star break, Bumgarner posted a 1.94 earned run average, which was the lowest by any Giants pitcher since 1983. He limited the Diamondbacks to a single hit on July 10 in a 4–0 shutout, striking out 14. It was Bumgarner's fourth career one-hitter, the most by a Giants pitcher since Mathewson threw six. The game was a no-hitter until Jake Lamb got a hit with one out in the eighth. During Cain's 100th win on July 31, Bumgarner pinch-hit for Cain after Cain had thrown five no-hit innings. Bumgarner hit an opposite-field leadoff double, becoming the first Giants pitcher to record a pinch-hit double since Ray Sadecki did so in 1967. Teammate Jeff Samardzija (also a fellow starter) pinch-ran for Bumgarner and scored a run as the Giants beat the Nationals 3–1.

On August 18 at AT&T Park, in a 10–7 win over the New York Mets, Bumgarner became the second pitcher since 1900 after Hal Jeffcoat of the 1957 Cincinnati Redlegs to allow a grand slam and then hit a go-ahead home run in the same inning, according to the Elias Sports Bureau. Bumgarner surrendered a grand slam to future teammate Justin Ruggiano in the top of the fourth inning and proceeded to hit a two-run home run off of Jacob deGrom in the bottom of the fourth inning. In his next start, on August 23, Bumgarner struck out Rob Segedin for his 200th strikeout of the season, becoming the first left-handed pitcher in Giants franchise history to accomplish the feat for three straight seasons, and tying Mathewson for second all-time behind Rusie's, Marichal's, and Lincecum's four.

On September 3 at Wrigley Field, in a 3–2 win over the eventual World Series Champion Chicago Cubs, Bumgarner faced defending NL Cy Young Award winner Jake Arrieta. He struck out ten batters and walked nobody, notching his thirtieth career double-digit strikeout game, surpassing Mathewson's twenty-nine for second place in Giants franchise history behind only Lincecum's thirty-six. Against the Dodgers on September 20, Bumgarner had another 10-strikeout game with no walks. With his 240th strikeout of the season, he broke Cy Seymour's Giants' record for strikeouts in a single season by a left-handed pitcher, which had stood since 1898. On September 30 at AT&T Park, in a 9–3 win over the Los Angeles Dodgers, Bumgarner picked up his 100th career win. According to CSN Bay Area, at age 27 years and 60 days, he became the third youngest pitcher in franchise history, the youngest left-handed pitcher, and the youngest in the San Francisco Era to reach the milestone. He broke Juan Marichal's San Francisco milestone when Marichal was 27 years, 288 days old in 1965. Only Hal Schumacher (24 years and 234 days in 1938) and Christy Mathewson (24 years and 262 days in 1905) were younger. He became the seventh pitcher in the San Francisco Era to reach the milestone and the third Giant to win his 100th career game on the 2016 season, joining fellow rotation mates Johnny Cueto and Matt Cain. "That's special to me just to get the opportunity to do that, but there's a lot more at stake right now." Bumgarner said reflecting postgame to the media in the Giants home locker room. "So that's kind of in the back of my mind. So it's definitely special to get to do. I'm very very thankful and blessed for that." "We know how good he is and it's a number and he's going to get a lot more wins," Bochy said speaking to the media postgame at the podium. "This guy's special. We've seen what he's done for us and he's just as good a competitor as I've ever seen and, you know, that's 100 wins. I mean that's pretty good. That means you're good. It means you've been around, you've been healthy and I don't think he's he's ever had any issues, knock on wood. And you know we're just fortunate to have him."

Bumgarner threw 3,571 total pitches and faced 912 total batters in 34 starts, all of which led the National League. He posted a 15–9 record, a 2.74 ERA, and 251 strikeouts in 226 2/3 innings. His 251 strikeouts ranked third in the league, behind Scherzer's 284 and José Fernández's 253; his 2.74 ERA was fourth, behind Kyle Hendricks's 2.13, Jon Lester's 2.44, and Noah Syndergaard's 2.60. Bumgarner was fourth place in voting for the NL Cy Young Award (behind Max Scherzer, Lester, and Hendricks); he finished sixteenth in NL MVP voting and was second to Scherzer among pitchers in voting.

The Giants had baseball's best record in the first half of the season, but they were baseball's fourth-worst team in the second-half. However, they still earned a spot in the NL Wild Card Game, winning the final four games of the regular season down the home stretch to qualify. October 5 at Citi Field, Bumgarner started that game. He pitched his third career postseason complete game four-hit shutout to give the Giants a 3–0 win over the defending National League Champion New York Mets. This made him the only player in postseason history with two complete game shutouts in winner-take-all games. When asked by ESPN's Buster Olney what he wants his legacy to be as a pitcher, Bumgarner replied "A winner. I mean that's all anybody wants to be known as is a winner." In the NLDS, Bumgarner and the Giants faced the National League Central Division Champion Cubs, who finished the year with baseball's best win–loss record at 103–58, and Arrieta again. On October 10 at AT&T Park, in Game 3, Bumgarner's 24 consecutive postseason scoreless innings streak ended when Arrieta homered off of him. With two outs and runners on first and second base in the top of the second inning, Arrieta launched a line drive 1-2 pitch off of Bumgarner into the left field bleachers for a three-run home run, scoring shortstop Addison Russell and second baseman Javier Báez. Arrieta became the first and only pitcher ever to hit a home run off of Bumgarner. Bumgarner pitched five innings and left with the Giants trailing 3–2, but the Giants rallied to win 6–5 in 13 innings. This was Bumgarner's last career postseason start and game and it was the only win for the Giants in this series. The Cubs then defeated the National League West champion Los Angeles Dodgers in the NLCS four games to two, winning their first National League Pennant in 71 years. The Cubs would eventually win the 2016 World Series in seven games over the Cleveland Indians, their first World Series championship since 1908 in 108 years, ending the Curse of the Billy Goat.

==== 2017 ====
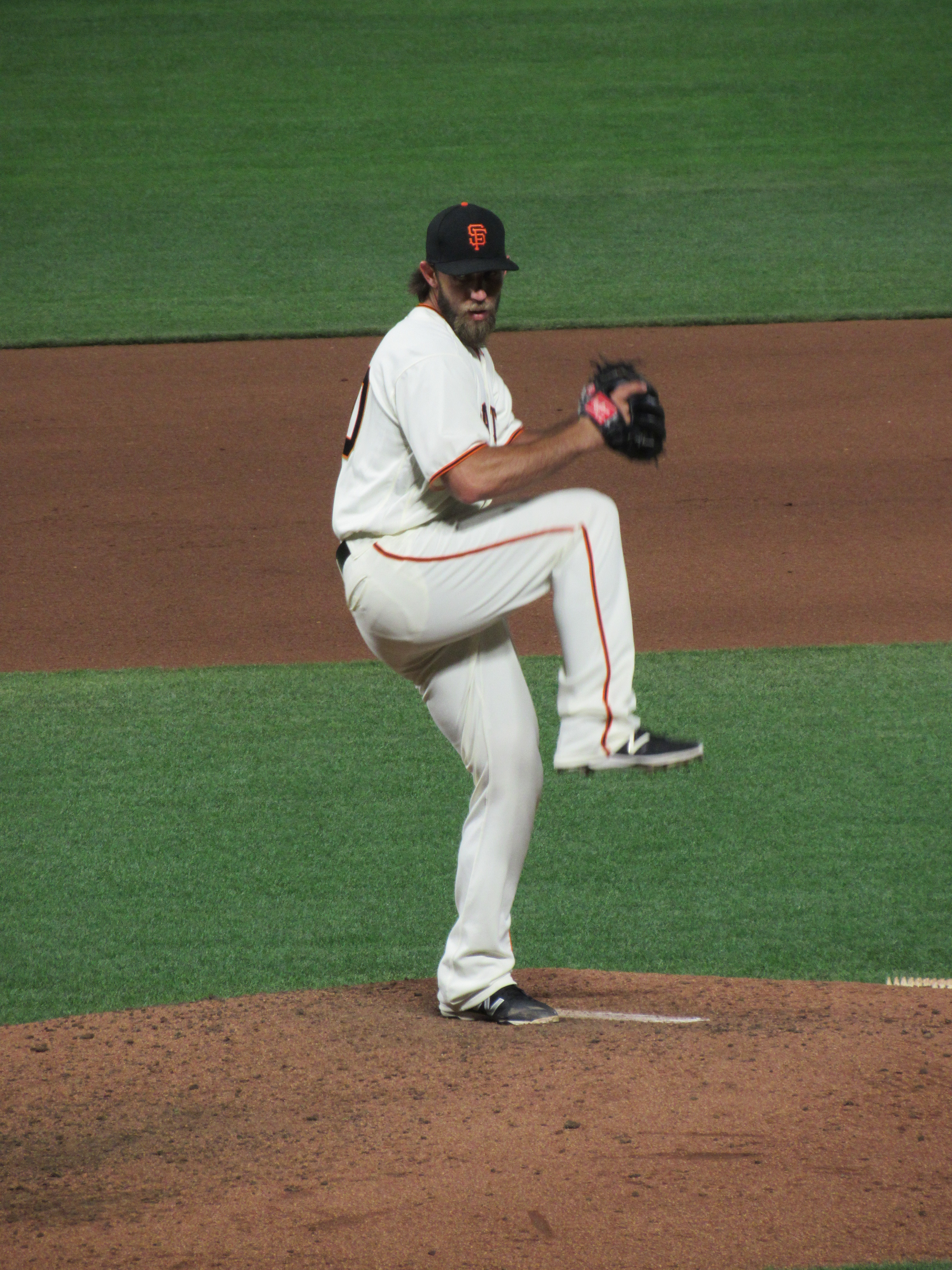
Bumgarner pitching in 2017

In his fourth consecutive Opening Day start on April 2, 2017, Bumgarner struck out 11 in seven innings pitched and hit two home runs, including one against Greinke. He became the fourth player to strikeout 10 batters and hit two home runs in a game since the mound moved to its current distance in 1893, joining Rick Wise (1971), Pedro Ramos (1963) and Milt Pappas (1961). Greinke later joined this list in 2019 and Shohei Ohtani in 2023. He became the first pitcher to hit two home runs on Opening Day as well as the fourth Giants pitcher and the first in the San Francisco Era to hit a home run on Opening Day, joining Mickey Welch (May 1, 1884), Larry Benton (April 18, 1929), and Johnny Antonelli (April 17, 1956). The second home run made him the Giants' record-holder in home runs by a pitcher, pushing him past Hal Schumacher. Bumgarner also joined Carlos González and Joey Votto as the third player to hit multiple home runs off of both Kershaw and Greinke. However, the Giants lost 6–5 to the Diamondbacks. On April 19, Bumgarner pitched against the Kansas City Royals for the first time since 2014 and made his first return to Kauffman Stadium since Game 7 of the 2014 World Series. On April 20 in the mountains one hour outside of Denver, Colorado, Bumgarner rented Honda dirt bikes on an off day with two family members. More than two hours later and almost back to the truck, Bumgarner slipped and fell off of his dirt bike and hit the ground on his pitching shoulder in a freak accident, losing control more or less at the end. Not in serious pain but knowing something was wrong, they called the trainers once they got back to the room in the downtown hotel. They then went to the emergency room in a hospital to get everything checked out, doing multiple CT scans, magnetic resonance imaging (MRI) tests and X-rays. He suffered injuries to his throwing shoulder, a Grade 1 or 2 sprain of the AC joint, and bruised ribs. Bochy came to see him, and he talked to his teammates as well as Giants General Manager Bobby Evans and Baer, who were all super supportive. Beginning on April 21, the Giants placed Bumgarner on the disabled list for the first time in his career. On April 24 at AT&T Park, returning from the road trip, a remorseful Bumgarner answered questions from the media and indicated that there was no timetable for his return, saying that he would bust his butt in rehab. On April 25, the Giants announced that he would not need surgery. On April 26, Bochy told reporters that Bumgarner would begin rehab work soon.

On June 6, the Giants transferred Bumgarner from the 10-day DL to the 60-day DL. On July 15, 2017, the Giants activated Bumgarner from the 60-day disabled list. He was out of the starting rotation for nearly three months. Bumgarner returned on July 15 at Petco Park against the San Diego Padres. He struck out the side in the bottom of the first inning, striking out center fielder Manuel Margot swinging and second baseman Carlos Asuaje and first baseman Wil Myers looking. Bumgarner received a no-decision in a 5–3 defeat. Bumgarner's first win of the year did not come until ten days later, against the Pirates.

With a 3–5 record on August 15, Bumgarner lost his next four decisions before winning his last game of the year to finish with a 4–9 record. In 17 starts, Bumgarner had a 3.32 ERA and 101 strikeouts in 111 innings pitched.

After the season, on November 5, the Giants exercised Bumgarner's 2018 contract option worth $12 million.

==== 2018 ====
On March 23, 2018, at Scottsdale Stadium, in his last scheduled Spring Training start, Bumgarner broke one of his pitching fingers on a comebacker in the top of the third inning off the bat of Kansas City Royals starting second baseman and utility player Whit Merrifield, who was leading off the inning. Bumgarner sustained a fractured left hand, specifically the knuckle of his pinky finger and his fifth metacarpal bone. The injury required pins inserted and surgery the next day. Bumgarner had already been named the Opening Day starting pitcher. Instead, Ty Blach filled in on March 29 at Dodger Stadium, which the Giants and Blach won 1–0 over the Dodgers and Kershaw. On March 29, 2018, the Giants placed Bumgarner on the 10-day disabled list retroactive to March 26, 2018. On April 11, 2018, the Giants transferred Bumgarner from the 10-day disabled list to the 60-day disabled list.

On June 5, 2018, Bumgarner was activated from the 60-day disabled list, returning to the starting rotation and making his season debut at AT&T Park against the Arizona Diamondbacks. Bumgarner picked up his first win of the year in his fourth start, a 3–0 win over the Padres on June 21. On June 26, Bumgarner said that rule changes are "kind of getting out of hand" when Major League Baseball explored adding a "universal" designated hitter by adding the position in the National League. On June 27, in a 1–0 walk-off win over the Rockies, Bumgarner struck out leadoff hitter and second baseman DJ LeMahieu in the top of the first inning for his 1,500th career strikeout, becoming the fourth-fastest left-handed pitcher since 1920 to reach the milestone. It was his 239th career game; Randy Johnson (206), Kershaw (218), and David Price (236) were the only ones since 1920 to reach 1,500 strikeouts quicker. From June 16 through July 2, he threw 22 straight scoreless innings.

Bumgarner picked up his 106th career win in a 13–8 win over the Cardinals on July 8, surpassing Rueter for the most wins by a left-handed pitcher in the San Francisco Era. On August 23, in a 3–1 win over the Mets, Bumgarner won his 109th career game, surpassing Lincecum for sole possession of third place in the San Francisco Era and the most wins by a pitcher under Bruce Bochy's managerial career.

On September 25 at AT&T Park, in a 5–4 win over the San Diego Padres, Bumgarner registered his first career walk-off hit and run batted in. In the bottom of the twelfth inning and with the score tied at four, Bumgarner pinch hit for Mark Melancon, batting eighth. Bumgarner hit a ground ball RBI single to left field off of pitcher Rowan Wick, knocking in Gorkys Hernández from third base. His walk-off hit and run batted in are the firsts by a Giants pitcher in twenty-eight years. Don Robinson was the last Giants pitcher to do so on July 31, 1990, also a walk-off RBI single.

In 21 starts, Bumgarner had a 6–7 record, a 3.26 ERA, and 109 strikeouts in 129 2/3 innings pitched. On October 29, the Giants exercised Bumgarner's 2019 contract option worth $12 million.

==== 2019 ====
On November 6, 2018, during the offseason, Farhan Zaidi became president of baseball operations when he joined the Giants. The 2018 MLB Winter Meetings took place between December 9–13 at Mandalay Bay Resort in Las Vegas. On December 11, Zaidi said the Giants could try embracing the 'opener' pitching strategy under him. During the 2018 season, openers emerged and were subsequently used to begin games. Former teammate Sergio Romo's emergence as an opener with the Tampa Bay Rays popularized the practice in 2018.

On February 9, 2019, at Oracle Park, during one of the Q&A sessions at Giants FanFest, Bochy revealed that Bumgarner texted him "If you're using an opener in my game, I'm walking right out of the ballpark" during the Winter Meetings after learning that the Giants were considering using openers for the upcoming season. On February 17, Bumgarner said that he was joking over opener refusal. There was speculations and many questions about Bumgarner's future with the club as his contract was set to expire at the end of the 2019 season. On February 18, 2019, at Scottsdale Stadium, during spring training, Bochy announced that he would be retiring following the conclusion of the 2019 season.

With his fifth career Opening Day start on March 28, 2019, Bumgarner joined Marichal as the only pitchers to make at least five Opening Day starts for the San Francisco era Giants. He joined Carl Hubbell as the only left-handed pitchers in franchise history to reach 1,600 strikeouts, but the Giants lost 2–0 to the Padres.

On June 15, Bumgarner passed Hubbell's strikeout total in a game against the Brewers. Though he gave up five runs (three earned), the Giants won 8–7, with Bumgarner receiving a no-decision. He held the Rockies to two runs in six innings on June 25 and drove in the Giants' third run with an RBI single in a 4–2 victory.

In an 8–4 win over the Cardinals on July 6, Bumgarner was removed after two innings due to being hit by a batted ball in the first inning. However, he had two strikeouts in the game, passing Lincecum's 1,704 to move into fourth place all-time by a Giant. On July 31, the day before his 30th birthday, despite numerous trade speculations that would have sent him to a potential playoff contender, Bumgarner was not traded at the MLB trade deadline.

On August 8, Bumgarner became the first starting pitcher to have a hit and draw two or more walks at the plate while allowing one hit or fewer on the mound since 1920, according to STATS LLC. He also became the first pitcher ever to accomplish this feat while having more strikeouts pitching rather than batting. He made his 278th career start in a 3–2 win over the Oakland Athletics on August 13, surpassing Rueter (277) for the most by a left-handed pitcher in the San Francisco era and the second-most in franchise history behind Hubbell (433). This win put Bumgarner one win behind former rotation mate Lincecum for the second most career victories by a pitcher in the history of the ballpark. On August 13 at Oracle Park, in a 3–2 win over the Oakland Athletics, Bumgarner pitched seven innings of one-run ball, striking out nine and allowed only two hits. This was Bumgarner's 59th career home win, tying Lincecum for the second most career victories by a pitcher in the history of the ballpark. This put him one behind the record held by another a former Giants pitcher, Cain. On August 30 at Oracle Park, in a 8–3 win over the San Diego Padres, Bumgarner pitched seven innings of one-run ball, striking out nine and allowed only four hits. This was Bumgarner's 60th career home win, moving past Lincecum and tying Cain for the most career victories by a pitcher in the history of the ballpark. He also lowered his career earned run average at home to 2.71, also a ballpark record and the lowest in its two-decade, 20-season history (minimum 20 games started) among Giants starting pitchers.

On September 24 at Oracle Park, Bumgarner pitched seven innings and struck out nine Colorado Rockies batters. Leading off the bottom of the third inning and on the first pitch he saw, Bumgarner hit a 369-foot fly ball off of pitcher Jeff Hoffman down the left field line for his 19th career home run and made the score 3–1. The home run was hit at a 40-degree launch angle, the highest by a pitcher since the introduction of the Statcast era. Posey homered as well, marking the third and final time they both homered in the same game as batterymates. Trailing 1–0 in the bottom of the first inning, Posey hit a fly ball off of Hoffman down the deep left field line and into the bleachers for a two-run homer, knocking in rookie outfielder Mike Yastrzemski. This game featured a Major League record 25 pitchers playing for both the Giants and the Rockies in over 16 innings. On September 29 at Oracle Park, in the season finale, a 9–0 loss to the Los Angeles Dodgers, Bumgarner played his last career regular season game as a Giant. In the bottom of the fifth inning and with two outs, Bumgarner pinch hit for Crawford, batting eighth. In a tuneup inning, Kershaw pitched and called rookie catcher Will Smith out to him so Bumgarner could soak it in. As he walked from the on deck circle to the plate and entered the batter's box, he received a standing ovation from Giants announcers, executives, fans, and teammates, as Bumgarner tipped his batting helmet. A seven-pitch at bat, Bumgarner lined-out to third baseman Jedd Gyorko. As he walked off the mound, Kershaw tipped his cap to Bumgarner and Bochy, who was managing his final career game as Giants manager in San Francisco, who in turn acknowledged him. At the conclusion of Fan Appreciation Day and Weekend, the Giants organization, which ranged from alumni, coaches, executives, former players from the 2007 to 2009 Giants, 2010, 2012, and 2014 World Series championship teams, honored Bochy in a postgame ceremony bidding farewell to him. Bochy was also surrounded by his family. The event was broadcast live on local television on NBC Sports Bay Area, and Bumgarner gifted Bochy a present at the beginning of his tributes. "...I think of watching Bum do something I don't think we'll ever see in the game again," Bochy said acknowledging Bumgarner by recognizing his 2014 postseason in his farewell speech.

Leading the National League with 34 games started again, Bumgarner posted a 9–9 record, a 3.90 ERA, and 203 strikeouts in 207 2/3 innings pitched.

After the season, Bumgarner became a free agent for the first time in his career. On November 4, the Giants tendered him a $17.8 million qualifying offer. On November 14, he rejected their offer, which was expected. Bumgarner finished his 11-season San Francisco Giants career with a 119–92 win–loss record, a 3.13 earned run average, and 1,794 strikeouts. The Giants received a Compensation pick after Competitive Balance Round B in the 2020 MLB draft. On June 11, 2020, the Giants used that pick to draft NC State Wolfpack left-handed pitcher Nick Swiney 67th overall. On July 3, Swiney signed with the Giants organization.

=== Arizona Diamondbacks (2020–2023) ===
Bumgarner became an unrestricted free agent at 12:01 a.m. EDT on November 4, 2019. On December 4, 2019, teams were informed that Bumgarner was seeking a five-year deal over $100 million, according to USA Today's Bob Nightengale. During this time, he was contacted by nine teams, including the Braves, St. Louis Cardinals, Cincinnati Reds, Arizona Diamondbacks, Los Angeles Angels, Minnesota Twins, New York Yankees, Los Angeles Dodgers, and Giants, according to MLB Network's Jon Heyman. On December 15, 2019, it was reported that Bumgarner would sign a five-year contract with the Diamondbacks worth $85 million, staying in the NL West, sources told MLB.com's Mark Feinsand and Steve Gilbert. $15 million ($5 million each from his 2021-23 salaries) is deferred until after his deal is completed. Bumgarner and his wife had been coming out there since the Giants drafted him in 2007 and he had horses there. Prior to signing with Arizona, the Diamondbacks hired Giants bullpen coach Matt Herges as their new pitching coach and signed Giants free agent catcher Stephen Vogt. The deal was officially completed on December 17 at his introductory press conference. At the time, it was the second-largest contract in franchise history. The Diamondbacks forfeited their Second round pick of the 2020 MLB draft. Upon signing, Bumgarner said that he liked the direction the team was going, stated that the Phoenix area was like a second home to him, and said that winning was what the whole decision was based on. USA Today reported that Bumgarner was offered at least two five-year $100 million deals. The Giants reportedly offered Bumgarner a four-year, $70 million contract, according to ESPN's Jeff Passan.

==== 2020 ====
On July 24, 2020, at Petco Park, Bumgarner made his Arizona Diamondbacks team debut as their Opening Day starting pitcher against the San Diego Padres. On August 4 at Chase Field, he made his Arizona home debut as a Diamondback against the defending American League champion Houston Astros. He was placed on the disabled list on August 10, 2020.

On September 5 at an empty Oracle Park, Bumgarner pitched against his former team, the San Francisco Giants, for the first time in his career. Bumgarner ended the season with back-to-back scoreless five inning outings to finish the year. In the final game of the season, on September 27 at Chase Field, in an 11–3 win over the Colorado Rockies, he won his first career game as an Arizona Diamondback. In his first season with Arizona, which was shortened due to the COVID-19 pandemic, Bumgarner finished with a 1–4 win–loss record with a 6.48 ERA in 41 2/3 innings.

==== 2021 ====
On April 25, 2021, at Truist Park, in a 7–0 win over the eventual World Series Champion Atlanta Braves, Bumgarner pitched seven no-hit innings in the second game of a doubleheader, in a game shortened to seven innings by MLB adopting the doubleheader rule in Minor League Baseball in 2020 and 2021. Because the game was only seven innings long, even though it was a full regulation game under doubleheader rules (Rule 7.01), Bumgarner was credited with a complete game, a shutout, but not a no-hitter. It would have been the third no-hitter in franchise history. This was very nearly a perfect game and would have been the second one in franchise history. Bumgarner almost pitched three career perfect games had it not been for one baserunner. The only baserunner was second baseman Ozzie Albies. Leading off the bottom of the second inning, on a 1-2 pitch, he hit a curveball that was a ground ball into the hole at shortstop (Nick Ahmed) and third base (Asdrúbal Cabrera). The throw by Ahmed, a two-time Gold Glove Award winner, pulled the first baseman Wyatt Mathisen off the bag as he stretched out to right field to make the catch. On April 26, Bumgarner, along with San Diego Padres shortstop Fernando Tatís Jr., were named National League Co-Players of the Week for the week of April 19–25. In the first game of the doubleheader, teammate Zac Gallen pitched a complete game one-hit shutout. According to the Elias Sports Bureau, with the only hit in two combined games, the Braves amassed the fewest hits in a doubleheader in MLB history. Bumgarner's would have been the third no-hitter thrown during the 2021 MLB season. On August 14, 2021, at Chase Field, in a 7–0 win over the San Diego Padres, teammate Tyler Gilbert pitched the eighth no-hitter of the season in his first career Major League start. Nine no-hitters ended up being thrown during the season. The previous record was eight, set in 1884. The previous modern era record (since 1901) was seven, accomplished in 1990, 1991, 2012, and 2015. Bumgarner almost threw one in 2012 and 2015.

On May 22, 2023, it was later revealed that during this time Bumgarner feuded with Diamondbacks pitching strategist Dan Haren, a former MLB pitcher. They never spoke again after Bumgarner told the press that he had ditched the scouting reports, leading to an angry confrontation with Haren.

On August 3 at Chase Field, in an 3–1 win over the eventual National League West Division Champion San Francisco Giants, Bumgarner defeated his former team for the first time in his career. In the process, he accomplished the feat of defeating every National League team. The Giants would go on to win the National League West and a franchise-record 107 games in the 162 game schedule in Posey's last season. He finished 7–10 with a 4.67 ERA, striking out 124 batters in 146 1/3 innings pitched. Bumgarner was a finalist for the Silver Slugger Award, which was won by Max Fried.

==== 2022 ====
Through the first seven starts of 2022, Bumgarner posted a 1.78 earned run average. On May 4 at LoanDepot Park, after pitching the bottom of the first inning to start the game against the Miami Marlins, Bumgarner was ejected after first base umpire Dan Bellino completed checking Bumgarner's left hand. This was Bumgarner's second career ejection, both in Miami. Bellino stared at him and held his hand for an abnormally long time during a standard routine foreign substance check spot. It was the first time in Major League history that a pitcher was ejected during a foreign substance check in which the pitcher was neither accused nor had a sticky substance. Two days later, Bellino issued a public apology and faced undisclosed discipline from MLB. Bumgarner addressed Bellino's apology and said that it was not directed at him.

On June 22, 2022, at Petco Park, Bumgarner struck out first baseman Luke Voit swinging in the bottom of the fourth inning for his 2,000th career strikeout. He became the eighth-fastest left-handed pitcher in terms of innings pitched and the 86th pitcher in major league history to reach the milestone.

On August 15 at Oracle Park, Bumgarner pitched 5 2/3 innings in his last game and start against his former team. With two outs in the bottom of the sixth inning, Diamondbacks manager Torey Lovullo replaced Bumgarner with pitcher Kevin Ginkel. As Bumgarner departed, he received a standing ovation from the fans as he walked off the pitcher's mound and field into the visiting dugout. For the season, Bumgarner was 7–15 with a 4.88 ERA, and gave up a major-league-leading 50 doubles in 158 2/3 innings.

==== 2023 ====
Major League Baseball implemented a pitch clock starting in the 2023 season. "Out of all the rules changes [over my career], I probably like this one the most," Bumgarner said on March 5.

In the three-game series finale on April 19 at Busch Stadium, in a 5–14 loss to the St. Louis Cardinals, Bumgarner made his last MLB appearance in the regular season. In his last career game and start, he pitched three innings, giving up seven hits and seven earned runs. He struck out two batters and walked four batters. The next day, on April 20, Bumgarner was designated for assignment by Arizona. He made four starts for the Diamondbacks in 2023, struggling to an 0–3 record and 10.26 ERA. In 16 2/3 innings pitched, he gave up 25 hits while recording 10 strikeouts against 15 walks. Arizona Diamondbacks Executive Vice President and General Manager Mike Hazen had discussed putting Bumgarner in the bullpen. After he went unclaimed and cleared waivers, he was officially and unceremoniously released by the team on April 26 with $34 million left remaining on the last two years of his contract. In four seasons with Arizona, Bumgarner had a 15–32 win–loss record, a 5.23 earned run average, and 276 strikeouts in 363 1/3 innings pitched.

The Texas Rangers were managed by Bochy in his first season as the team's manager. Bochy and Bumgarner won their first World Series championships together against the Texas Rangers in 2010. Before Game 7 of the ALCS, Bumgarner sent a text message to Bochy offering his services, according to ESPN's Buster Olney. Texas won Game 7 to win the American League pennant (third in franchise history) over the defending World Series champion Houston Astros, while the Diamondbacks won the 2023 National League pennant in seven games over the defending National League champion Philadelphia Phillies, advancing to the World Series. This was the Arizona Diamondbacks' second National League pennant and first World Series appearance since 2001. Bumgarner was eligible for another World Series ring if the Diamondbacks had won the World Series. On November 1 at Chase Field, in Game 5, a 5–0 win, Texas won the Series over Arizona in five games for the franchise's first World Series championship.

==== 2024 ====
On March 3, 2024, Bumgarner told his friends that he was contemplating making an MLB comeback, according to USA Today's Bob Nightengale.

== Career overall ==
Bumgarner finished with the fourth-most strikeouts in Giants history with 1,794, behind only Christy Mathewson (2,504), Juan Marichal (2,281), and Amos Rusie (1,835).

=== Statistics and achievements ===
Category	Years	WAR	W	L	ERA	G	GS	CG	SHO	SV	IP	H	R	ER	HR	BB	IBB	SO	HBP	ERA+	FIP	WHIP	H9	SO9	Ref.
Total	15	32.4	134	124	3.47	358	355	16	7	0	2,209 1/3	2,007	933	853	258	544	38	2,070	89	110	3.63	1.155	8.2	8.4	

== Pitching style ==
Madison Bumgarner pitching motion
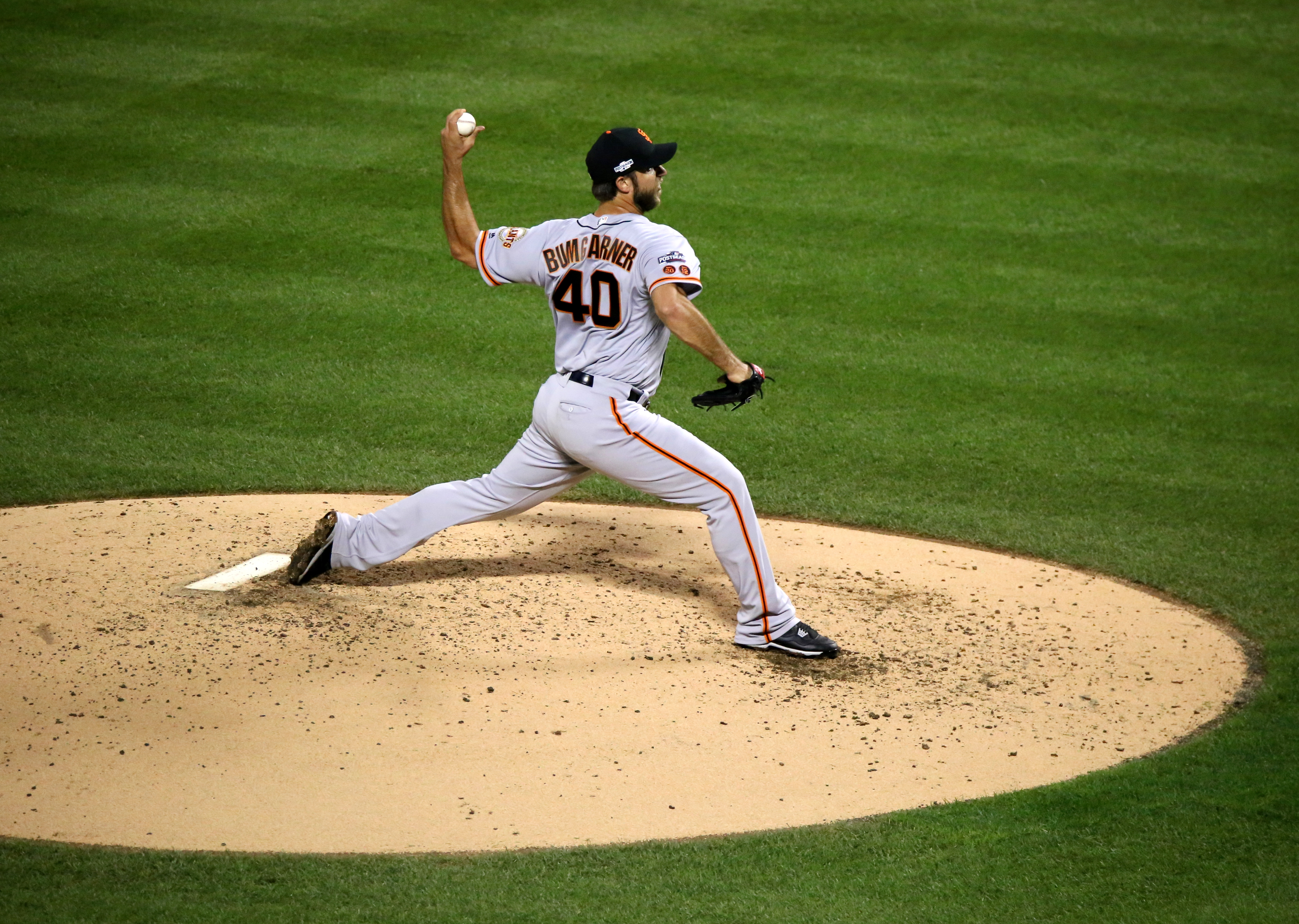

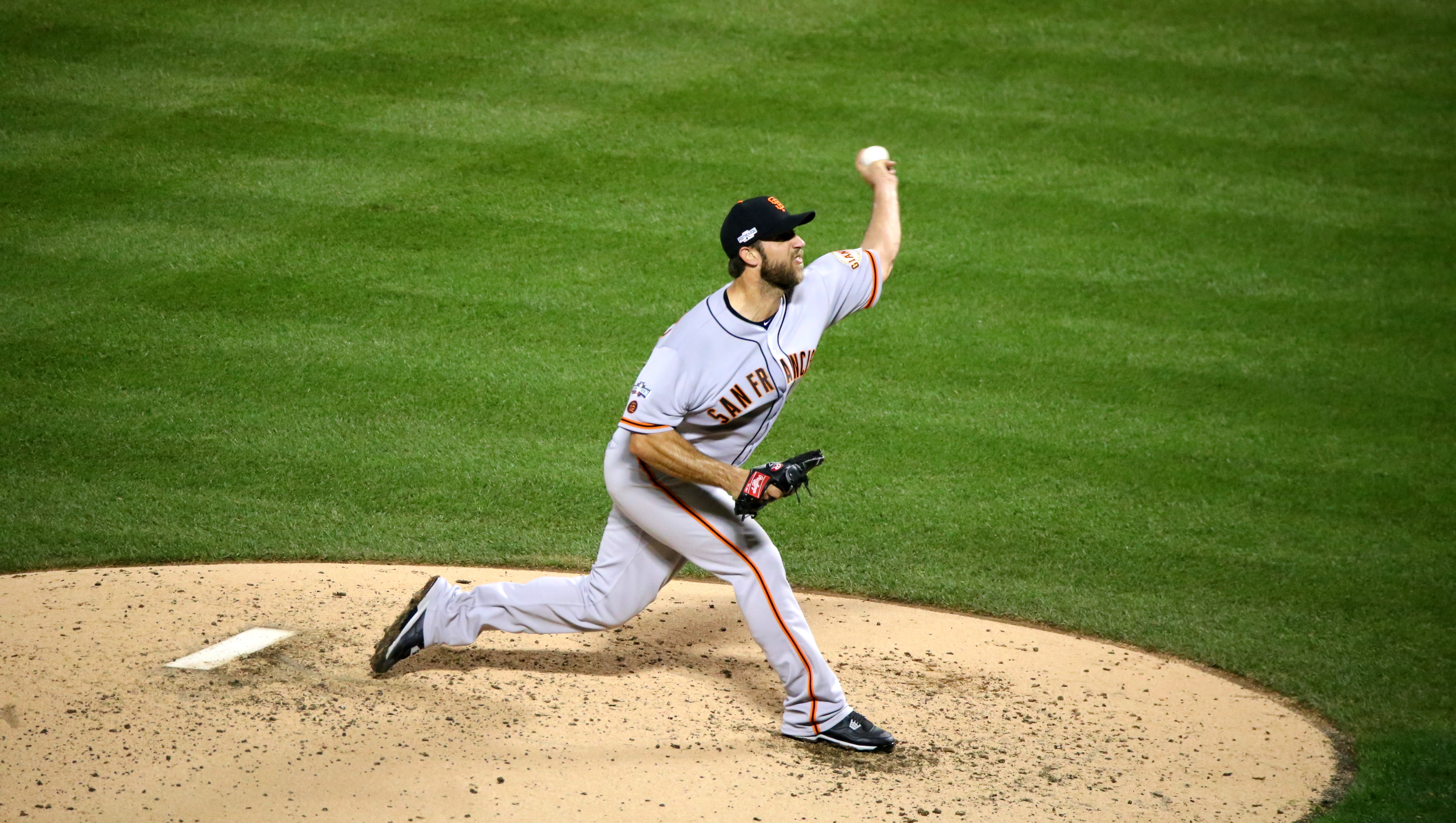

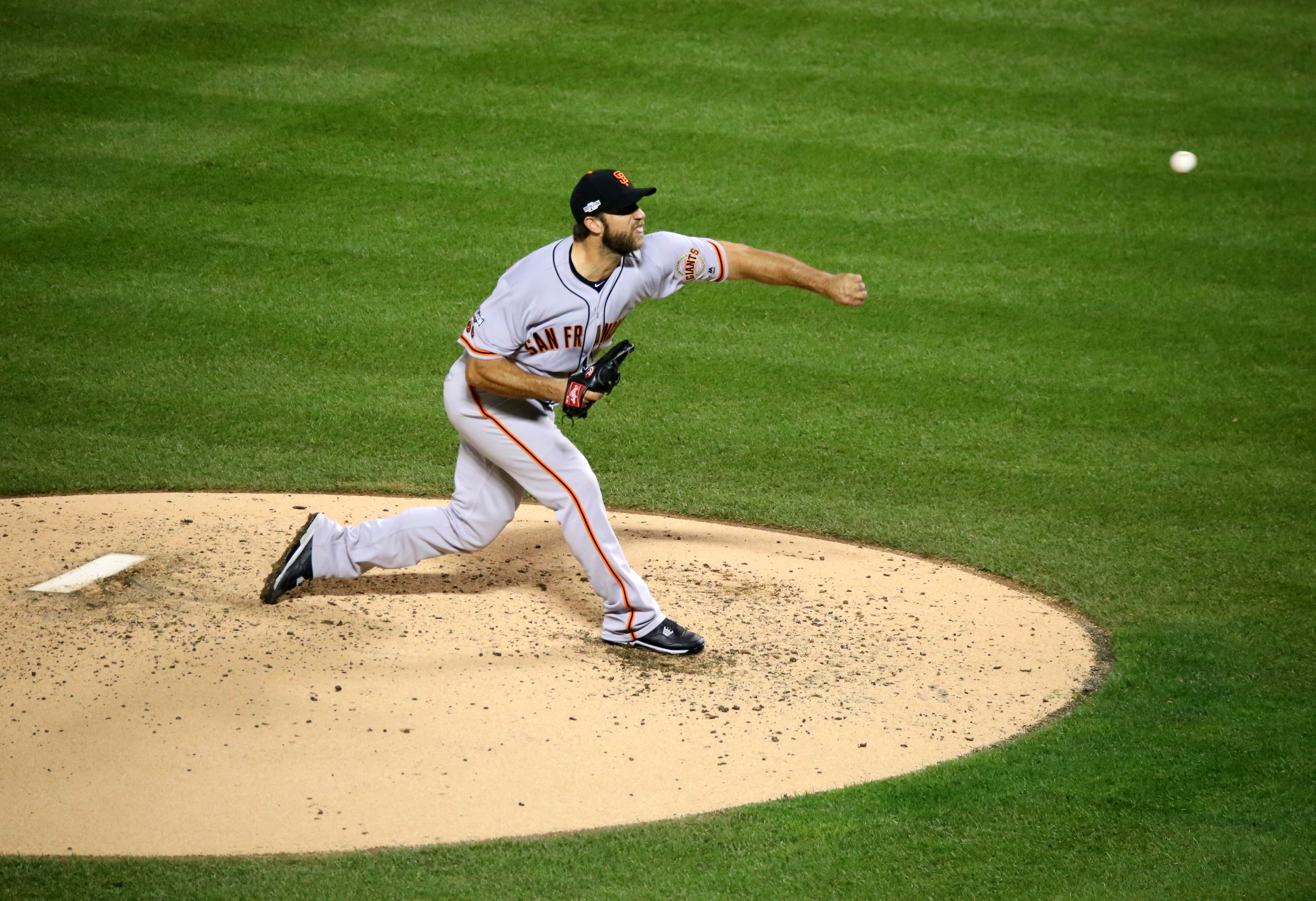

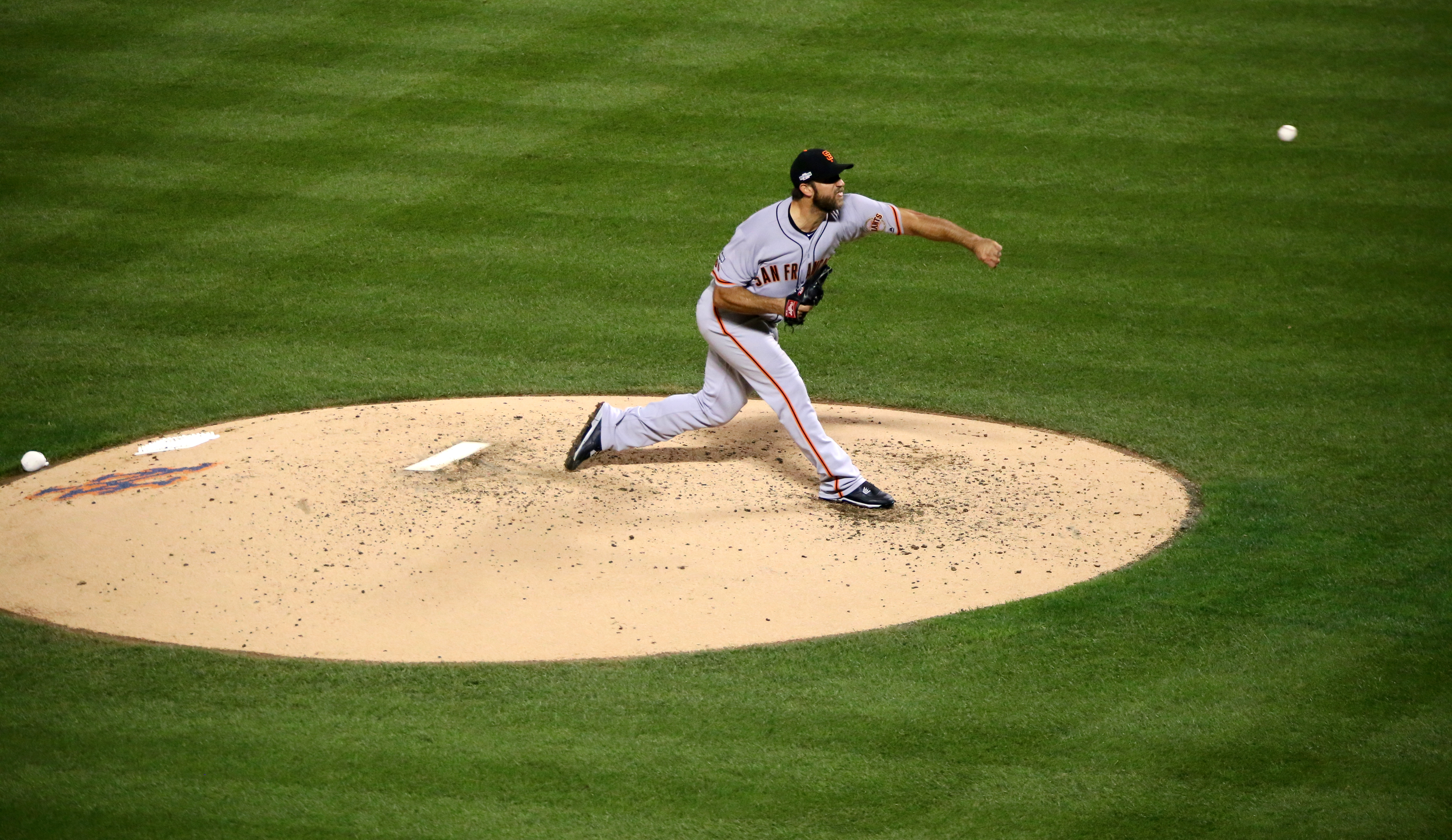

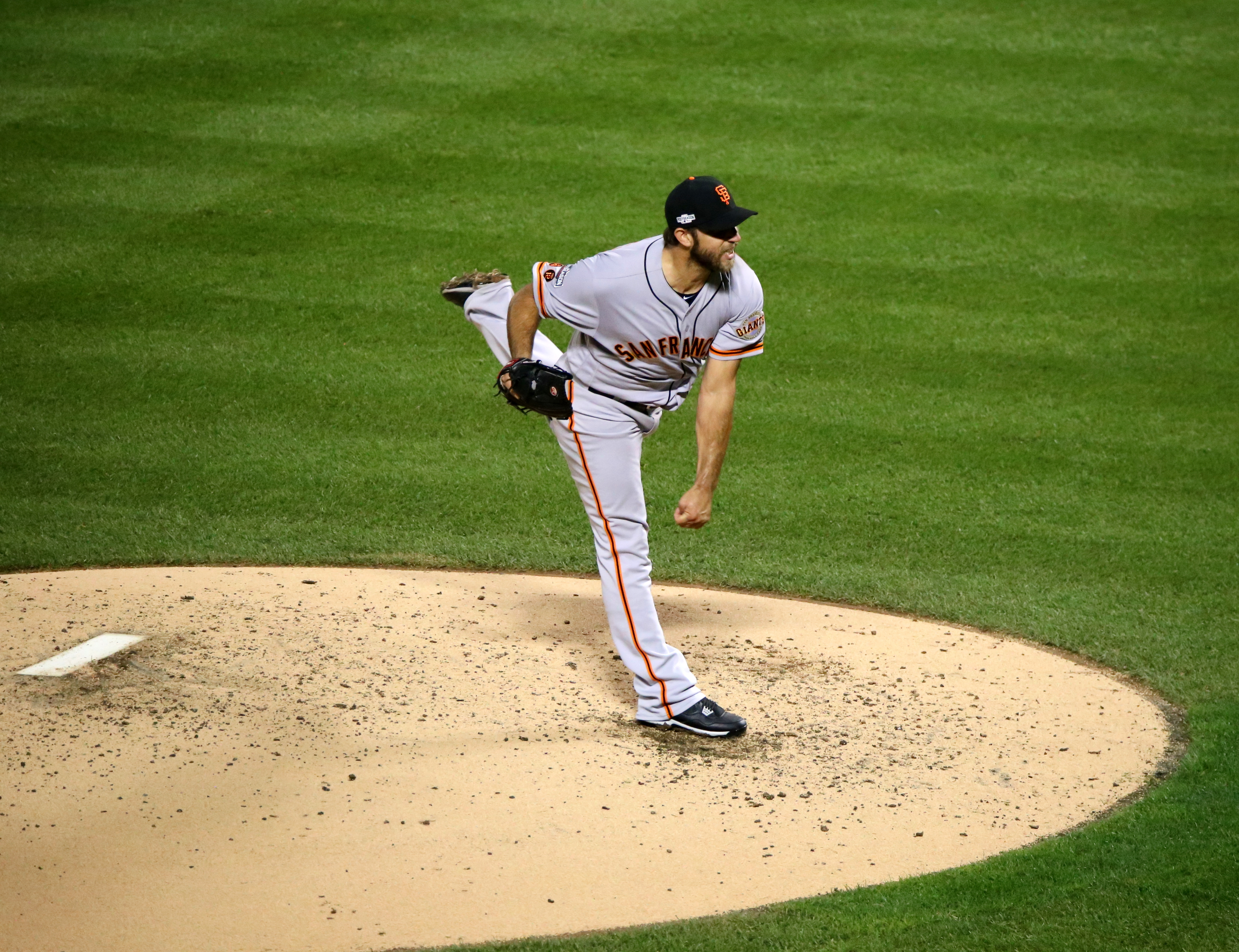

Throwing a ball is the only thing Bumgarner does left-handed. Bumgarner has a unique pitching style; as he throws, it appears he is throwing toward first base. Bumgarner's repertoire consists of four pitches including a curveball he throws at two different speeds with two different types of movement. He features a four-seam fastball with an average velocity of 92.22 mph, a cutter that averages 87.77 mph, and a curveball that averages 77.45 mph with a sharp, mostly downward break. Occasionally, he throws a much slower curve with a more exaggerated and horizontal break that averages 70.25 mph, and he also throws a change-up that sits at an average of 84.51 mph. He tends to throw the fastball and the cutter over 30 percent of the time (exact percentage varies from year to year), and the change-up and curveball are his secondary pitches.

== Legacy ==
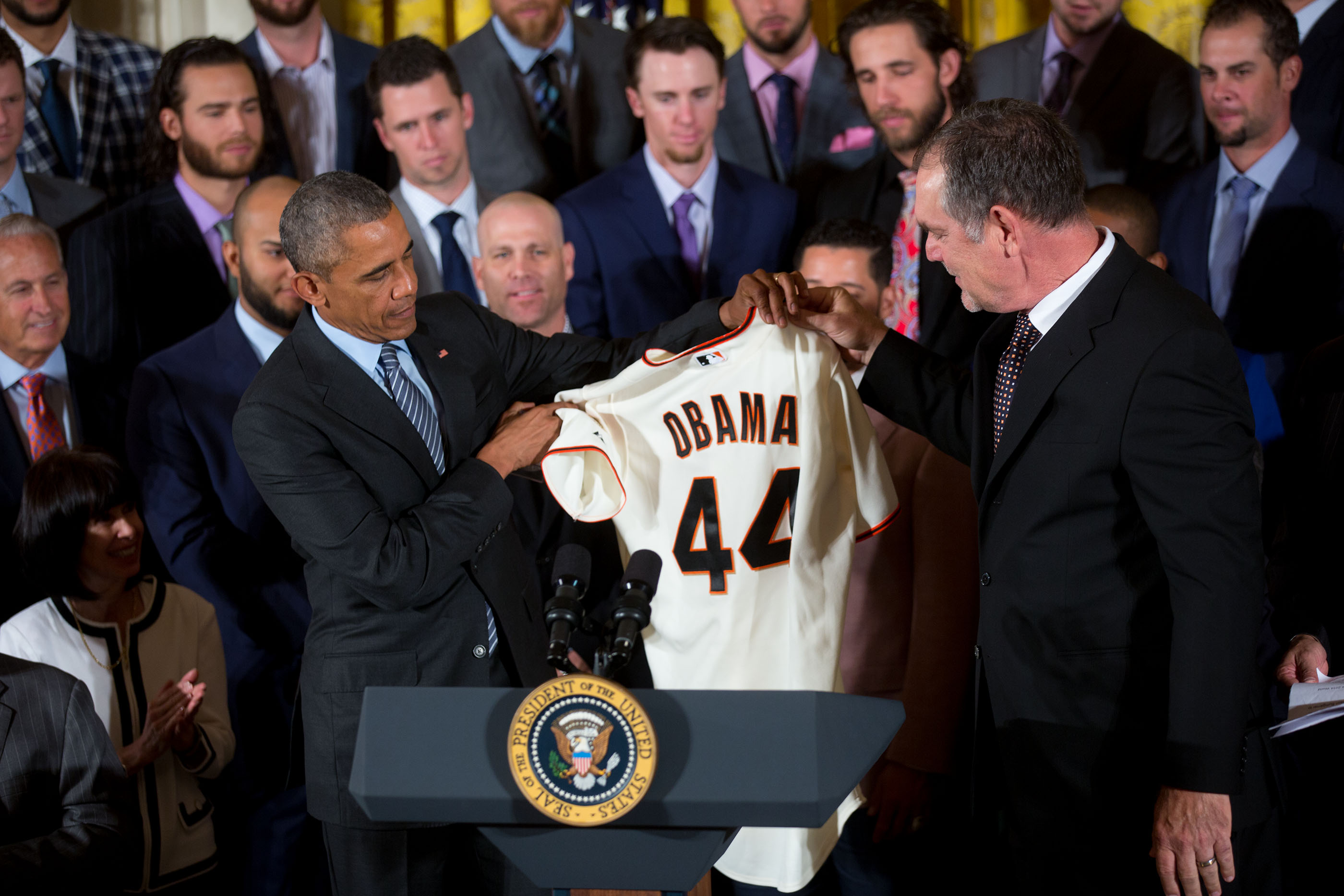
Bumgarner with the Giants welcomed in the East Room of the White House in 2015

"And I guess they do have one other thing--Madison Bumgarner. They got Maddy. So last October, Madison put together a string of performances that I think is pretty hard to believe--and I'm not talking about his locker room celebrations. Twenty-five years old and is already one of the best pitchers in postseason history. For his career, he's 4-0 with a [0].25 ERA in the World Series. Last year, he set a new record for postseason innings pitched. And of course, there's Game 7, which is what kids in their backyards dream about. Madison comes in from the bullpen on just two days' rest after throwing a complete game shutout in Game 5. He throws five more scoreless innings to wrap up the title with one of the greatest performances in World Series history."

— President of the United States Barack Obama remarks on Bumgarner and his playoff successes

Bumgarner is widely regarded as one of the greatest World Series pitchers of all time. For his career, he started four games in five pitching appearances. He posted a 4–0 win–loss record, a World Series record 0.25 earned run average (minimum 20 innings of work), a complete game shutout, a save, and 31 strikeouts in 36 innings pitched. His 31 career World Series strikeouts are the second most by a left-handed pitcher in franchise history, trailing only Giants Hall of Famer Carl Hubbell by one. He is also widely regarded as one of the greatest postseason pitchers of all time. For his career, Bumgarner started 14 games in 16 pitching appearances. He posted an 8–3 win–loss record, a 2.11 earned run average, 3 complete games that were all shutouts, a save, and 87 strikeouts in 102 1/3 innings pitched.

== Career highlights ==
Bumgarner hit 19 career home runs, the second-most hit by a pitcher, behind Carlos Zambrano's 24, since the AL adopted the designated hitter rule in 1973. The Giants have not reissued Bumgarner's number 40.

=== Awards ===
Award / Honor	Time(s)	Date(s)	Ref(s)
Baseball America All-Rookie Team	1	2010	
NL All-Star	4	2013, 2014, 2015, 2016	
NL Pitcher of the Month	2	May 2014, August 2014	
World Series Most Valuable Player Award	1	2014	
World Series champion	3	2010, 2012, 2014	
Babe Ruth Award	1	2014	
NLCS MVP	1	2014	
Major League Baseball Pitcher of the Month Award	2	May & August 2014	
Major League Baseball Player of the Week Award	2	August 10–16, 2015; April 19–25, 2021	
NL Silver Slugger Award at pitcher	2	2014, 2015	
Associated Press Male Athlete of the Year	1	2014	
Sports Illustrated Sportsman of the Year	1	2014	
Willie Mac Award	1	2014	

== Post-playing career ==
On August 10 at Oracle Park, Bumgarner attended and partook in festivities celebrating the 10-year anniversary of the 2014 World Series championship team. He was the last person introduced out of the Giants dugout and received the largest ovation. He carried and placed the third Commissioner's Trophy between the first two on a table in front of the pitcher's mound before taking his seat. Giants sportscasters Duane Kuiper and Mike Krukow served as MCs and interviewed Bumgarner on the field and in the booth. As he attempted to answer Krukow's first question on the field, Bumgarner was interrupted with a standing ovation and he acknowledged the crowd by tipping his camouflage cap. He threw out the ceremonial first pitch to former battery mate Buster Posey and received another Buster Hug. During the second inning, he joined "Kruk and Kuip" on NBC Sports Bay Area. While he had not formally retired, he did not want to discuss current or future plans. "Don't ask me what I'm doing. Don't ask me if I'm coming back and don't ask me what I'm doing."

On November 25, 2024, Posey, the Giants new president of baseball operations, appeared on The Athletic's "Starkville" with Jayson Stark and Doug Glanville Podcast and hinted that Bumgarner wants to return to the Giants and have some sort of involvement, either in an advisory role or possibly joining the coaching staff and help the young pitchers.

== Personal life ==
Bumgarner's parents are Kevin and Debbie Bumgarner. Kevin works nights at a food distribution company, while Debbie is an accountant for PepsiCo. He has a stepsister and two older half-brothers. His half-sister, Dena, died in 2010 after accidentally overdosing on pain medication after being hospitalized due to cancer. Bumgarner has been a Baptist since his childhood. Andrew Baggarly, a reporter who covers the Giants, wrote of Bumgarner, "While I wouldn't describe him as outgoing, he struck me as being smart, well spoken and polite. He is deeply Christian and seems to be very grounded."

Bumgarner is a cowboy, a farmer, and a rancher. He operates a family-owned business, 4440 Ranch & Cattle Company, in the Blue Ridge Mountains. They sell pasture-raised and grain-fed F1 Wagyu beef in Lenoir, North Carolina.

Bumgarner and his high school sweetheart, Ali Saunders, married on February 14, 2010, in a private ceremony in which he wore "a white open-collar shirt and blue jeans while carrying a pocketknife." Prior to marrying his wife Ali, Bumgarner dated a woman also named Madison Bumgarner. Upon hearing this, Jeff Foxworthy rated Bumgarner a perfect 10 on the redneck scale. During the offseason, they live on a farm in North Carolina which is about thirty minutes from where he grew up in the old furniture manufacturing area of the state. On June 24, 2019, at Oracle Park, in an exclusive ESPN interview with former MLB pitcher and broadcaster Rick Sutcliffe, Bumgarner revealed that he plays catch with Ali, who grew up playing softball through high school.

During the season, Bumgarner and teammate Hunter Pence were neighbors in San Francisco, living in a $5,000 a month rental condo with views of the Bay Bridge and Oracle Park.

== Appearances outside of baseball ==
Bumgarner has appeared on television as a guest on The Tonight Show Starring Jimmy Fallon. In episode 154 during season 1, he gave Jimmy Fallon MadBum underwear. Bumgarner has endorsement deals with Carhartt and Ford and has appeared in television commercials for both.

On July 7, 2015, singer and musician Tim Hall, who knows Bumgarner's father and coached Bumgarner as a child, dedicated a song to him called "Outlaw Southpaw." Hall, inspired by Bumgarner's 2014 postseason and World Series heroics, posted it on YouTube with his country band Tim Hall and Buffalo Country.

Bumgarner's article All In a Day's Work was published on April 6, 2016, on The Players' Tribune. On February 23, 2020, Bumgarner revealed in an interview for The Athletic that he has competed in rodeo events as a team roper under the alias Mason Saunders, combining a shortened version of his first name with his wife's maiden name. He said that he had been roping since his mid-teens—long enough that "it's part of who you are"—and he has been discreetly competing in rodeos for some time, including during his MLB career. Bumgarner, who added that he was frequently recognized at rodeo events, won over $26,000 in a competition in Wickenburg, Arizona about two weeks before he signed his Diamondbacks contract, and said that he may pursue roping more seriously after the end of his MLB career. He has a section on his Baseball Reference page titled Team-Roping Rodeo Competition Winnings. The Arizona Diamondbacks and their Executive Vice President and General Manager Mike Hazen were not aware of Bumgarner's other interests until the story was published.

== MLB records ==
=== San Francisco Era records ===
- Most career World Series wins: 4
- Most career World Series strikeouts by a left-handed pitcher: 31
- Most career postseason complete game shutouts: 3
- Most / Longest consecutive postseason scoreless innings streak: 24 (2014, 2016)
- Most career wins by a left-handed pitcher: 119
- Most career wins at Oracle Park: 60 (tied with Matt Cain)
- Lowest career ERA at Oracle Park (minimum 20 games started) among Giants starting pitchers: 2.72
- Most career one-hitters: 4
- Most home runs by a pitcher, single season: 5 (2015)

=== Giants franchise records ===
- Most career postseason wins: 8
- Most wins by a pitcher in a single postseason: 4, 2014 (tied with Lincecum, 2010)
- Most career postseason strikeouts: 87
- Most strikeouts by a pitcher in a single postseason: 45, 2014
- Most strikeouts by a left-handed pitcher in a single World Series: 17, 2014
- Most career postseason complete game four-hit shutouts: 3
- Highest career postseason Win Probability Added: 2.7 in 102 1/3 innings pitched
- Highest career World Series Win Probability Added: 2.1 in 36 innings pitched
- Highest Win Probability Added in a single postseason: 1.7 in 52 2/3 innings pitched, 2014
- Highest Win Probability Added in a single World Series: 1.3 in 21 innings pitched, 2014
- Highest career postseason Championship WPA: 132.6 in 102 1/3 innings pitched
- Highest Championship WPA in a single postseason: 99.5 in 52 2/3 innings pitched
- Highest Championship WPA in a single World Series: 92.0 in 21 innings pitched, 2014
- Lowest walks and hits per innings pitched in a single World Series: .476 in 21 innings pitched, 2014
- Most career strikeouts by a left-handed pitcher: 1,794
- Most strikeouts by a left-handed pitcher in a single season: 251 (2016)
- Most seasons with 200 strikeouts by a left-handed pitcher: 4 (2014–2016, 2019)
- Most consecutive seasons with 200 strikeouts by a left-handed pitcher: 3 (2014–2016)
- Most career games with 14 or more strikeouts: 3 (tied with Gaylord Perry)
- Most career games with 10 or more strikeouts by a left-handed pitcher: 33
- Most career games with 10 or more strikeouts and zero walks: 12
- Most career home runs by a pitcher: 19

=== Regular season records ===
- Most career grand slams hit by a pitcher: 2 (tied with 6 others)
- Most grand slams hit by a pitcher in a single season: 2 in 2014 (tied with Tony Cloninger)
- Most home runs hit by a pitcher on Opening Day: 2 on April 2, 2017, at Chase Field vs. Arizona Diamondbacks

=== Postseason records ===
- Longest save in a postseason game: 5 innings in Game 7, 2014 World Series
- Longest save in a winner-take-all game: 5 innings in Game 7, 2014 World Series
- Lowest career postseason road ERA (minimum 25 innings of work): 0.50
- Most innings pitched in a single postseason: 52 2/3, 2014
- Most total pitches thrown in a single postseason: 702, 2014
- Most starts in a single postseason: 6, 2014 (tied with Curt Schilling, 2001; Chris Carpenter, 2011; Corey Kluber, 2016; and Justin Verlander, 2019)
- Most career postseason starts of at least 7 shutout innings: 6
- Most starts with at least 7 innings pitched, single postseason: 6 (tied with Curt Schilling, 2001)

=== World Series records ===
- Lowest career World Series ERA (minimum 20 innings of work): 0.25 in 36 innings pitched
- Highest career win–loss percentage: 1.000 in 36 innings pitched
- Highest win–loss percentage in a single World Series: 1.000 in 21 innings pitched, 2014
- Lowest career walks and hits per innings pitched: 0.528 in 36 innings pitched
- Lowest career hits per nine innings pitched: 3.500 in 36 innings pitched
- Highest career championship win probability added: 121.8 in 36 innings pitched
- Fewest hits allowed in a single World Series by any pitcher with at least 20 innings pitched: 9 in 21 innings, 2014
- Most shutout innings in relief in a World Series Game 7: 5 (tie with Joe Page)
- Longest save in a World Series Game: 5 innings in Game 7, 2014
- Longest save in a World Series-clinching/winner-take-all Game: 5 innings in Game 7, 2014
- Most World Series games won through age 25: 4
- First MLB pitcher in a single World Series to earn at least two wins, throw a shutout and earn a save–in 2014
- First MLB pitcher in a World Series to pitch a shutout with at least eight strikeouts and no walks–Game 5 in 2014

== See also ==
- List of Arizona Diamondbacks Opening Day starting pitchers
- List of Major League Baseball all-time leaders in home runs by pitchers
- List of Major League Baseball career strikeout leaders
- List of Major League Baseball career WHIP leaders
- List of Major League Baseball no-hitters
- List of Major League Baseball record holders
- List of San Francisco Giants Opening Day starting pitchers
- List of San Francisco Giants team records
- List of Silver Slugger Award winners at pitcher
- List of World Series starting pitchers

== Sources ==
- Baggarly, Andrew (2011). A Band of Misfits: Tales of the 2010 San Francisco Giants. Chicago: Triumph Books. ISBN 978-1-60078-598-6.
