= Andrew Baggarly =

American journalist and author

Andrew Baggarly (born c. 1975) is an American journalist and author who has covered Major League Baseball teams since 1998 and the San Francisco Giants since 2004. As of December 2017, he is the Giants beat writer for The Athletic.

Baggarly is the author of A Band of Misfits: Tales of the 2010 San Francisco Giants (2011) and Giant Splash: Bondsian Blasts, World Series Parades, and Other Thrilling Moments by the Bay (2015).

== Career ==
In 1998, Baggarly began covering Major League Baseball for the San Bernardino County Sun. Baggarly later worked for the Riverside Press-Enterprise, where he served as a beat reporter covering the Anaheim Angels from 2000 to 2001 and the Los Angeles Dodgers from 2002 to 2003.

Baggarly spent a combined eight years with the Oakland Tribune, from 2004 to 2006, and the San Jose Mercury News, from 2006 to 2012, covering Giants baseball as a beat writer. He also followed the Giants in his blog, "Extra Baggs," created for Bay Area News Group. In 2012, Baggarly joined Comcast SportsNet Bay Area as their "Giants Insider", covering the team on several different multiplatform outlets. In late September 2014, Baggarly was reportedly boycotted by Giants players after he wrote about a clubhouse argument. Baggarly left CSN and returned to the Bay Area News Group in 2015. In December 2017, Baggarly joined The Athletic as their Giants beat writer.

Baggarly served as an official scorer for the 2007 MLB All-Star Game. As a member of the Baseball Writers' Association of America (BBWAA), he is a Major League Baseball Hall of Fame voter.

== Personal ==
Baggarly was born in Naperville, Illinois and grew up a Chicago Cubs fan in suburban Los Angeles. He graduated from Damien High School in La Verne, California, and the Medill School of Journalism at Northwestern University in 1997. He lives in Millbrae, California.

As a child, Baggarly appeared on the Bill Rafferty-hosted version of Card Sharks in the 1980s. In 2012, he appeared on the game show Jeopardy!, becoming a three-time champion.
