= List of San Francisco Giants seasons =

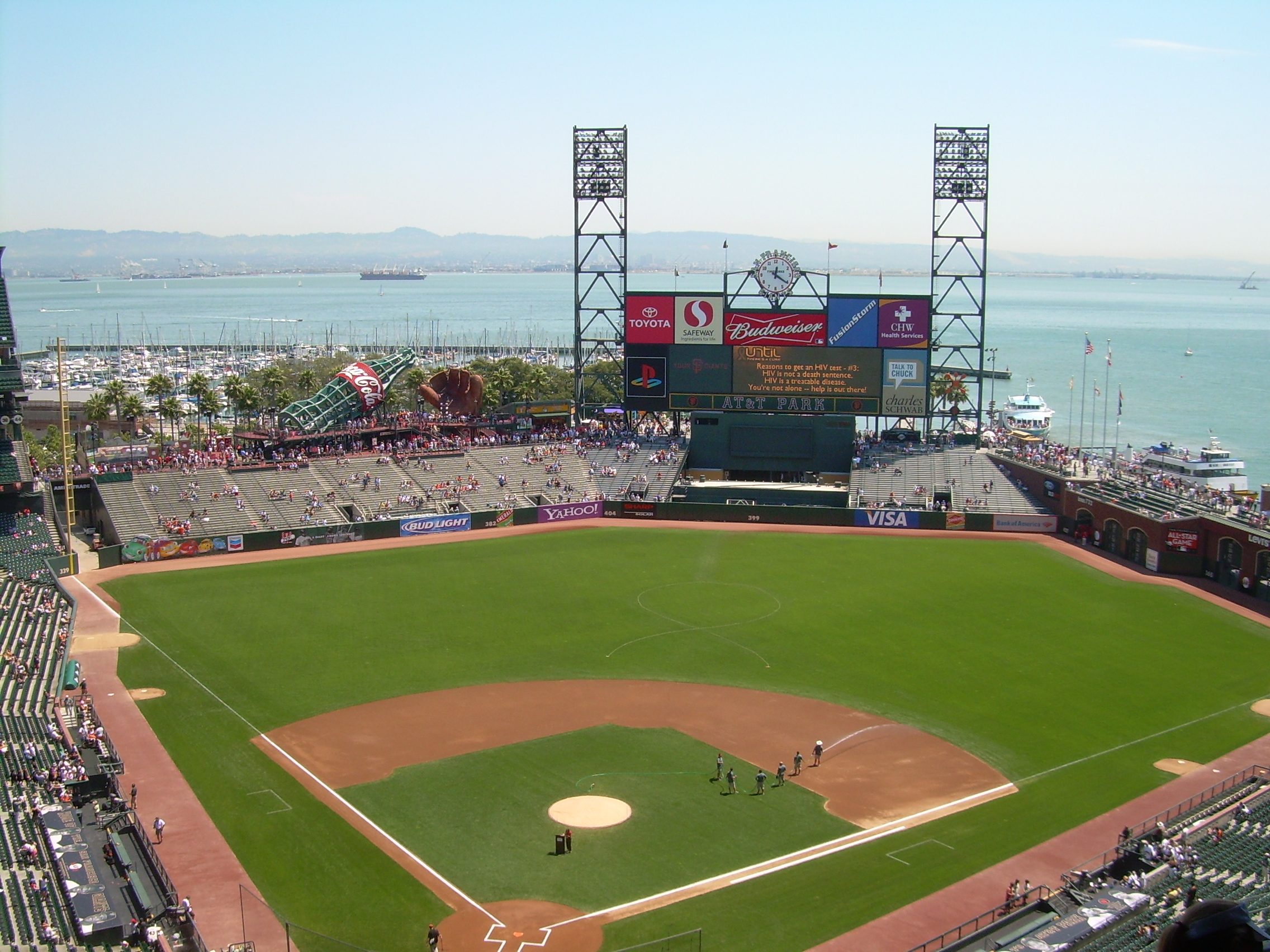
Oracle Park, home field of the Giants since the 2000 season.

The San Francisco Giants are a professional baseball team based in San Francisco, California. They have been a member of the National League (NL), as a part of Major League Baseball, since the team's inception in 1883. They joined the NL West following the establishment of divisions within the league in 1969. The Giants played 75 seasons in New York City, New York, as the New York Gothams and New York Giants, spending the majority of their seasons at the Polo Grounds in Upper Manhattan. The Giants relocated to San Francisco in 1958, briefly playing at Seals Stadium. After sharing Candlestick Park for 29 years with the San Francisco 49ers National Football League team, the Giants moved to their current home, Oracle Park, in 2000. From October 1, 2010, through June 16, 2017, the Giants recorded a National League-record 530 consecutive sellouts.

The Giants are one of the most successful teams in Major League Baseball history, having won more games than any other team and having the second highest winning percentage. In New York, the Giants enjoyed 55 winning seasons, with only 3 losing seasons between 1903 and 1939, a stretch which included two runs of 10 or more straight winning seasons (1903–14 and 1916–1925). In San Francisco the Giants have had 39 winning seasons, including their first fourteen in the city. Their eight World Series titles are tied for fourth-most in baseball, while their 23 pennants are the second most in the National League, and third-most overall. Their first title came in 1905 against the Philadelphia Athletics, where they won the series 4–1. They claimed four consecutive National League pennants between 1921 and 1924, going on to beat cross-town team the New York Yankees in the World Series on two of those occasions. Their fourth title came in 1933 as they beat the Washington Senators in five games. The 1951 season saw the Giants beat their rivals the Brooklyn Dodgers in a three-game playoff for the National League pennant. The Giants won the series 2–1 on a walk-off home run by Bobby Thomson in game 3, a moment remembered as the Shot Heard 'Round the World. They went on to lose in the World Series to the Yankees. A 4–0 series sweep of the Cleveland Indians in the 1954 World Series earned the Giants their fifth title.

Until 2010, the Giants were without a title since relocation to San Francisco — at the time this was the third-longest World Series winning drought in the league. They have made it to the World Series on six occasions following the move, but were on the losing side each of the first three times. Among those was the 1989 World Series, when the "Bay Bridge Series", being contested against neighboring team the Oakland Athletics, was interrupted by the 1989 Loma Prieta earthquake; the series was postponed for ten days, and the Giants were eventually swept by the A's. The club ended its title-winning drought in 2010, as they beat the Texas Rangers 4–1 to bring the Commissioner's Trophy to San Francisco for the first time in the city's history. The Giants won their second title in San Francisco in 2012, sweeping the Detroit Tigers, and won again for the third time in five years in 2014, defeating the Kansas City Royals in seven games.

In their entire history (143 years), the Giants have never had more than four straight losing seasons. Until 2022, they had never finished at exactly .500, either finishing above or below that mark every year.

== Year by year results ==
Pre–World Series champions (Pre–1903) ^{‖}	World Series champions (1903–present) ^{†}	National League champions (1883–present) ^{‡}	Division champions (1969–present) ^{*}	Wild Card berth (1994–present) ^{§}

MLB season	Team season	League	Division	Finish	Wins	Losses	Win%	GB	Postseason	Awards
New York Gothams
1883	1883	NL		6th	46	50	.479	16		
1884	1884	NL		4th	62	50	.554	22		
New York Giants
1885	1885	NL		2nd	85	27	.759	2		
1886	1886	NL		3rd	75	44	.630	12.5		
1887	1887	NL		4th	68	55	.553	10.5		
1888 ^{‖}	1888	NL ^{‡}		1st	84	47	.641	–	Won World Series (Browns) 6–4 ^{‖}	Tim Keefe (TC)
1889 ^{‖}	1889	NL ^{‡}		1st	83	43	.659	–	Won World Series (Bridegrooms) 6–3 ^{‖}	
1890	1890	NL		6th	63	68	.481	24		
1891	1891	NL		3rd	71	61	.538	13		
1892	1892	NL		8th	71	80	.470	31.5		
1893	1893	NL		5th	68	64	.515	19.5		
1894 ^{‖}	1894	NL		2nd	88	44	.667	3	Won Temple Cup (Orioles) 4–0 ^{‖}	Amos Rusie (TC)
1895	1895	NL		9th	66	65	.504	21.5		
1896	1896	NL		7th	64	67	.489	27		
1897	1897	NL		3rd	83	48	.634	9.5		
1898	1898	NL		7th	77	73	.513	25.5		
1899	1899	NL		10th	60	90	.400	42		
1900	1900	NL		8th	60	78	.435	23		
1901	1901	NL		7th	52	85	.380	37		
1902	1902	NL		7th	48	88	.353	53.5		
1903	1903	NL		2nd	84	55	.604	6.5		
1904	1904	NL ^{‡}		1st	106	47	.693	–	World Series cancelled^{[a]} ^{‡}	
1905 ^{†}	1905	NL ^{‡}		1st	105	48	.686	–	Won World Series (Athletics) 4–1 ^{†}	Christy Mathewson (TC)
1906	1906	NL		2nd	96	56	.632	20		
1907	1907	NL		4th	82	71	.536	25.5		
1908	1908	NL		2nd	98	56	.636	1		Christy Mathewson (TC)
1909	1909	NL		3rd	92	61	.601	18.5		
1910	1910	NL		2nd	91	63	.591	13		
1911	1911	NL ^{‡}		1st	99	54	.647	–	Lost World Series (Athletics) 4–2 ^{‡}	
1912	1912	NL ^{‡}		1st	103	48	.682	–	Lost World Series (Red Sox) 4–3 ^{‡}	Larry Doyle (MVP)
1913	1913	NL ^{‡}		1st	101	51	.664	–	Lost World Series (Athletics) 4–1 ^{‡}	
1914	1914	NL		2nd	84	70	.545	10.5		
1915	1915	NL		8th	69	83	.454	21		
1916	1916	NL		4th	86	66	.566	7		
1917	1917	NL ^{‡}		1st	98	56	.636	–	Lost World Series (White Sox) 4–2 ^{‡}	
1918	1918	NL		2nd	71	53	.573	10.5		
1919	1919	NL		2nd	87	53	.621	9		
1920	1920	NL		2nd	86	68	.558	7		
1921 ^{†}	1921	NL ^{‡}		1st	94	59	.614	–	Won World Series (Yankees) 5–3 ^{†}	
1922 ^{†}	1922	NL ^{‡}		1st	93	61	.604	–	Won World Series (Yankees) 4–0 ^{†}	
1923	1923	NL ^{‡}		1st	95	58	.621	–	Lost World Series (Yankees) 4–2 ^{‡}	
1924	1924	NL ^{‡}		1st	93	60	.608	–	Lost World Series (Senators) 4–3 ^{‡}	
1925	1925	NL		2nd	86	66	.566	8.5		
1926	1926	NL		5th	74	77	.490	13.5		
1927	1927	NL		3rd	92	62	.597	2		
1928	1928	NL		2nd	93	61	.604	2		
1929	1929	NL		3rd	84	67	.556	13.5		
1930	1930	NL		3rd	87	67	.565	5		
1931	1931	NL		2nd	87	65	.572	13		
1932	1932	NL		6th	72	82	.468	18		
1933 ^{†}	1933	NL ^{‡}		1st	91	61	.599	–	Won World Series (Senators) 4–1 ^{†}	Carl Hubbell (MVP)
1934	1934	NL		2nd	93	60	.608	2		
1935	1935	NL		3rd	91	62	.595	8.5		
1936	1936	NL ^{‡}		1st	92	62	.597	–	Lost World Series (Yankees) 4–2 ^{‡}	Carl Hubbell (MVP)
1937	1937	NL ^{‡}		1st	95	57	.625	–	Lost World Series (Yankees) 4–1 ^{‡}	
1938	1938	NL		3rd	83	67	.553	5		
1939	1939	NL		5th	77	74	.510	18.5		
1940	1940	NL		6th	72	80	.474	27.5		
1941	1941	NL		5th	74	79	.484	25.5		
1942	1942	NL		3rd	85	67	.559	25.5		
1943	1943	NL		8th	55	98	.359	49.5		
1944	1944	NL		5th	67	87	.435	38		
1945	1945	NL		5th	78	74	.513	19		
1946	1946	NL		8th	61	93	.396	36		
1947	1947	NL		4th	81	73	.526	13		
1948	1948	NL		5th	78	76	.506	13.5		
1949	1949	NL		5th	73	81	.474	24		
1950	1950	NL		3rd	86	68	.558	5		
1951	1951	NL ^{‡}		1st	98	59	.624	–	Lost World Series (Yankees) 4–2 ^{‡}	Willie Mays (ROY); Leo Durocher (MOY)
1952	1952	NL		2nd	92	62	.597	4.5		
1953	1953	NL		5th	70	84	.455	35		Leo Durocher (MOY)
1954 ^{†}	1954	NL ^{‡}		1st	97	57	.630	–	Won World Series (Indians) 4–0 ^{†}	Willie Mays (MVP); Leo Durocher (MOY)
1955	1955	NL		3rd	80	74	.519	18.5		
1956	1956	NL		6th	67	87	.435	26		
1957	1957	NL		6th	69	85	.448	26		
San Francisco Giants
1958	1958	NL		3rd	80	74	.519	12		Orlando Cepeda (ROY)
1959	1959	NL		3rd	83	71	.539	4		Willie McCovey (ROY)
1960	1960	NL		5th	79	75	.513	16		
1961	1961	NL		3rd	85	69	.552	8		
1962	1962	NL ^{‡}		1st	103	62	.624	–	Lost World Series (Yankees) 4–3 ^{‡}	
1963	1963	NL		3rd	88	74	.543	11		
1964	1964	NL		4th	90	72	.556	3		
1965	1965	NL		2nd	95	67	.586	2		Willie Mays (MVP)
1966	1966	NL		2nd	93	68	.578	1.5		
1967	1967	NL		2nd	91	71	.562	10.5		Mike McCormick (CYA)
1968	1968	NL		2nd	88	74	.543	9		
1969	1969	NL	West	2nd	90	72	.556	3		Willie McCovey (MVP)
1970	1970	NL	West	3rd	86	76	.531	16		
1971	1971	NL	West ^{*}	1st	90	72	.556	–	Lost NLCS (Pirates) 3–1	Charlie Fox (MOY)
1972	1972	NL	West	5th	69	86	.445	26.5		
1973	1973	NL	West	3rd	88	74	.543	11		Gary Matthews (ROY)
1974	1974	NL	West	5th	72	90	.444	30		
1975	1975	NL	West	3rd	80	81	.497	27.5		John Montefusco (ROY)
1976	1976	NL	West	4th	74	88	.457	28		
1977	1977	NL	West	4th	75	87	.463	23		
1978	1978	NL	West	3rd	89	73	.549	6		Joe Altobelli (MOY)
1979	1979	NL	West	4th	71	91	.438	19.5		
1980	1980	NL	West	5th	75	86	.466	17		
1981	1981	NL	West	5th	27	32	.458	9		
1981	1981	NL	West	3rd	29	23	.558	3.5		
1982	1982	NL	West	3rd	87	75	.537	2		Frank Robinson (MOY)
1983	1983	NL	West	5th	79	83	.488	12		
1984	1984	NL	West	6th	66	96	.407	26		
1985	1985	NL	West	6th	62	100	.383	33		
1986	1986	NL	West	3rd	83	79	.512	13		
1987	1987	NL	West ^{*}	1st	90	72	.556	–	Lost NLCS (Cardinals) 4–3	Roger Craig (MOY)
1988	1988	NL	West	4th	83	79	.512	11.5		
1989	1989	NL ^{‡}	West ^{*}	1st	92	70	.568	–	Won NLCS (Cubs) 4–1; Lost World Series (Athletics) 4–0 ^{‡}	Kevin Mitchell (MVP)
1990	1990	NL	West	3rd	85	77	.525	6		
1991	1991	NL	West	4th	75	87	.463	19		
1992	1992	NL	West	5th	72	90	.444	26		
1993	1993	NL	West	2nd	103	59	.636	1		Barry Bonds (MVP); Dusty Baker (MOY)
1994	1994	NL	West	2nd	55	60	.478	3.5		
1995	1995	NL	West	4th	67	77	.465	11		
1996	1996	NL	West	4th	68	94	.420	23		
1997	1997	NL	West ^{*}	1st	90	72	.556	–	Lost NLDS (Marlins) 3–0	Dusty Baker (MOY)
1998	1998	NL	West	2nd	89	74	.546	9.5		
1999	1999	NL	West	2nd	86	76	.531	14		
2000	2000	NL	West ^{*}	1st	97	65	.599	–	Lost NLDS (Mets) 3–1	Jeff Kent (MVP); Dusty Baker (MOY)
2001	2001	NL	West	2nd	90	72	.556	2		Barry Bonds (MVP)
2002	2002	NL ^{‡}	West	2nd ^{§}	95	66	.590	2.5	Won NLDS (Braves) 3–2; Won NLCS (Cardinals) 4–1; Lost World Series (Angels) 4–3 ^{‡}	Barry Bonds (MVP)
2003	2003	NL	West ^{*}	1st	100	61	.621	–	Lost NLDS (Marlins) 3–1	Barry Bonds (MVP)
2004	2004	NL	West	2nd	91	71	.562	2		Barry Bonds (MVP)
2005	2005	NL	West	3rd	75	87	.463	7		
2006	2006	NL	West	3rd	76	85	.472	11.5		
2007	2007	NL	West	5th	71	91	.438	19		
2008	2008	NL	West	4th	72	90	.444	12		Tim Lincecum (CYA)
2009	2009	NL	West	3rd	88	74	.543	7		Tim Lincecum (CYA)
2010 ^{†}	2010	NL ^{‡}	West ^{*}	1st	92	70	.568	–	Won NLDS (Braves) 3–1; Won NLCS (Phillies) 4–2; Won World Series (Rangers) 4–1 ^{†}	Buster Posey (ROY)
2011	2011	NL	West	2nd	86	76	.531	8		
2012 ^{†}	2012	NL ^{‡}	West ^{*}	1st	94	68	.580	–	Won NLDS (Reds) 3–2; Won NLCS (Cardinals) 4–3; Won World Series (Tigers) 4–0 ^{†}	Buster Posey (MVP)
2013	2013	NL	West	T-3rd	76	86	.469	16		
2014 ^{†}	2014	NL ^{‡}	West	2nd ^{§}	88	74	.543	6	Won NLWC (Pirates); Won NLDS (Nationals) 3–1; Won NLCS (Cardinals) 4–1; Won World Series (Royals) 4–3 ^{†}	
2015	2015	NL	West	2nd	84	78	.519	8		
2016	2016	NL	West	2nd ^{§}	87	75	.537	4	Won NLWC (Mets); Lost NLDS (Cubs) 3–1	
2017	2017	NL	West	5th	64	98	.395	40		
2018	2018	NL	West	4th	73	89	.451	18.5		
2019	2019	NL	West	3rd	77	85	.475	29		
2020	2020	NL	West	3rd	29	31	.483	14		
2021	2021	NL	West ^{*}	1st	107	55	.660	–	Lost NLDS (Dodgers) 3–2	Gabe Kapler (MOY)
2022	2022	NL	West	3rd	81	81	.500	30		
2023	2023	NL	West	4th	79	83	.488	21		
2024	2024	NL	West	4th	80	82	.494	18		
2025	2025	NL	West	3rd	81	81	.500	12		
2026	2026	NL	West	4th	65	97	.401	35		

== Record by decade ==
The following table describes the Giants' MLB win–loss record by decade.

Decade	Wins	Losses	Pct
1880s	503	316	.614
1890s	711	660	.519
1900s	823	645	.561
1910s	889	597	.598
1920s	890	639	.582
1930s	868	657	.569
1940s	724	808	.473
1950s	822	721	.533
1960s	902	704	.562
1970s	794	818	.493
1980s	773	795	.493
1990s	790	766	.508
2000s	855	762	.529
2010s	821	799	.507
2020s	522	510	.506
All-time	11687	10197	.534

These statistics are from Baseball-Reference.com's San Francisco Giants History & Encyclopedia, and are current as of September 28, 2025.

== Postseason record by year ==
The Giants have made the postseason twenty-seven times in their history, with the first being in 1905 and the most recent being in 2021.

Postseason record by year
Year	Finish	Round	Opponent	Result		
1905	World Series Champions	World Series	Philadelphia Athletics	Won	4	1
1911	National League Champions	World Series	Philadelphia Athletics	Lost	2	4
1912	National League Champions	World Series	Boston Red Sox	Lost	3	4
1913	National League Champions	World Series	Philadelphia Athletics	Lost	1	4
1917	National League Champions	World Series	Chicago White Sox	Lost	2	4
1921	World Series Champions	World Series	New York Yankees	Won	5	3
1922	World Series Champions	World Series	New York Yankees	Won	4	0
1923	National League Champions	World Series	New York Yankees	Lost	2	4
1924	National League Champions	World Series	Washington Senators	Lost	3	4
1933	World Series Champions	World Series	Washington Senators	Won	4	1
1936	National League Champions	World Series	New York Yankees	Lost	2	4
1937	National League Champions	World Series	New York Yankees	Lost	1	4
1951	National League Champions	World Series	New York Yankees	Lost	2	4
1954	World Series Champions	World Series	Cleveland Indians	Won	4	0
1962	National League Champions	World Series	New York Yankees	Lost	3	4
1971	National League West Champions	NLCS	Pittsburgh Pirates	Lost	1	3
1987	National League West Champions	NLCS	St Louis Cardinals	Lost	3	4
1989	National League Champions	NLCS	Chicago Cubs	Won	4	1
1989	National League Champions	World Series	Oakland Athletics	Lost	0	4
1997	National League West Champions	NLDS	Florida Marlins	Lost	0	3
2000	National League West Champions	NLDS	New York Mets	Lost	1	3
2002	National League Champions	NLDS	Atlanta Braves	Won	3	2
2002	National League Champions	NLCS	St Louis Cardinals	Won	4	1
2002	National League Champions	World Series	Anaheim Angels	Lost	3	4
2003	National League West Champions	NLDS	Florida Marlins	Lost	1	3
2010	World Series Champions	NLDS	Atlanta Braves	Won	3	1
2010	World Series Champions	NLCS	Philadelphia Phillies	Won	4	2
2010	World Series Champions	World Series	Texas Rangers	Won	4	1
2012	World Series Champions	NLDS	Cincinnati Reds	Won	3	2
2012	World Series Champions	NLCS	St Louis Cardinals	Won	4	3
2012	World Series Champions	World Series	Detroit Tigers	Won	4	0
2014	World Series Champions	NLWC	Pittsburgh Pirates	Won	1	0
2014	World Series Champions	NLDS	Washington Nationals	Won	3	1
2014	World Series Champions	NLCS	St Louis Cardinals	Won	4	1
2014	World Series Champions	World Series	Kansas City Royals	Won	4	3
2016	National League Wild Card	NLWC	New York Mets	Won	1	0
2016	National League Wild Card	NLDS	Chicago Cubs	Lost	1	3
2021	National League West Champions	NLDS	Los Angeles Dodgers	Lost	2	3
27	Totals			19-19	100	93

== All-time records ==
	Total Games	Wins	Losses	Win %
New York Gothams/Giants regular season record (1883–1957)	11,120	6,069	4,895	.554
San Francisco Giants regular season record (1958–present)	10,925	5,620	5,299	.515
All-time regular season record	22,045	11,687	10,197	.534
All-time post-season record^{[b]}	193	100	93	.518
All-time regular and post-season record	22,238	11,787	10,290	.530

These statistics are from Baseball-Reference.com's San Francisco Giants History & Encyclopedia, and are current as of September 29, 2026.

== Notes ==
- ^{a} The Giants were due to play against the Boston Americans, champions of the American League, but boycotted the series. John McGraw, then Giants manager, claimed the AL was inferior and any series would be unnecessary.
- ^{b} Does not include postseason games prior to 1903 — the beginning of the modern World Series era — as these were considered exhibition games.
