= List of San Francisco Giants Opening Day starting pitchers =

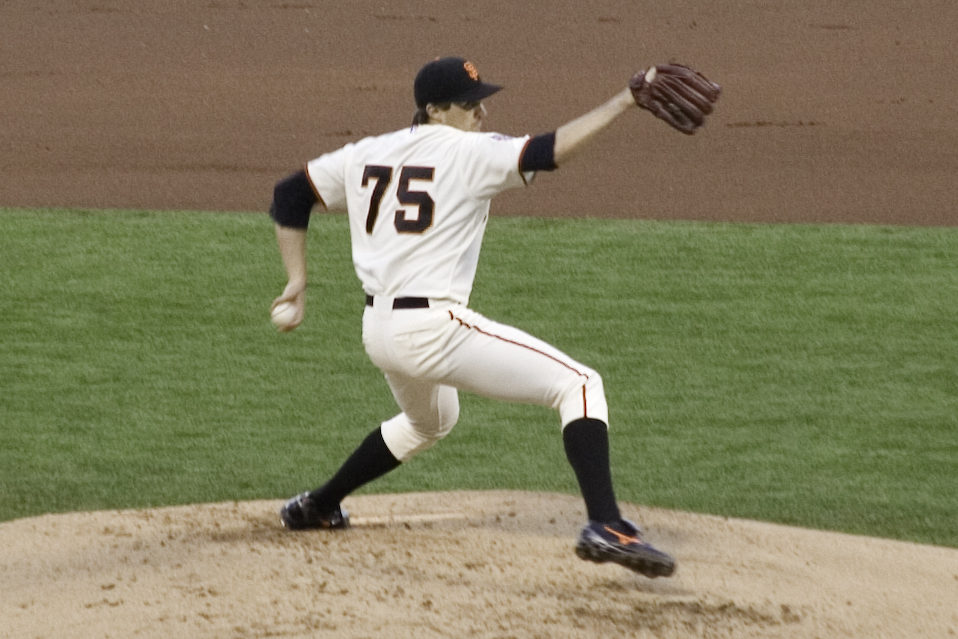
Barry Zito was the San Francisco Giants' Opening Day starting pitcher in 2007 and 2008.

The San Francisco Giants are a Major League Baseball franchise based in San Francisco, California. They moved to San Francisco from New York City in 1958. They play in the National League West division. The first game of the new baseball season for a team is played on Opening Day, and being named the Opening Day starter is an honor, which is often given to the player who is expected to lead the pitching staff that season, though there are various strategic reasons why a team's best pitcher might not start on Opening Day. Through 2016, the Giants have used 30 different Opening Day starting pitchers in their 58 seasons since moving to San Francisco. The 30 starters have a combined Opening Day record of 27 wins, 16 losses and 16 no decisions. No decisions are only awarded to the starting pitcher if the game is won or lost after the starting pitcher has left the game.

The first Opening Day game for the San Francisco Giants was played against the Los Angeles Dodgers on April 15, 1958, at Seals Stadium, the Giants' first home ball park in San Francisco. Rubén Gómez was the Giants' Opening Day starting pitcher that day, in a game the Giants lost 8–0. That was the Giants' only Opening Day game at Seals Stadium. They also played in two other home parks in San Francisco: Candlestick Park from 1960 to 1999, and Oracle Park, previously called PacBell Park, SBC Park and AT&T Park, since 2000. The Giants' Opening Day starting pitchers had a record of seven wins, three losses and seven no decisions at Candlestick Park and have a record of two wins, one loss and one no decision at AT&T Park. That gives the San Francisco Giants' Opening Day starting pitchers a total home record of 10 wins, 4 losses and 8 no decisions. Their record in Opening Day road games is 17 wins, 12 losses, and 8 no decisions.

Juan Marichal holds the San Francisco Giants' record for most Opening Day starts, with 10. Marichal had a record in Opening Day starts of six wins, two losses and two no decisions. Tim Lincecum and Madison Bumgarner each made four Opening Day starts for the Giants, and John Montefusco, Mike Krukow, John Burkett and Liván Hernández each made three Opening Day starts. Sam Jones, Vida Blue, Rick Reuschel, Mark Gardner, Kirk Rueter, Jason Schmidt and Barry Zito have each made two Opening Day starts for the Giants. Marichal has the most wins in Opening Day starts for San Francisco, with six. Reuschel and Burkett are the only pitchers to have won more than one Opening Day start for San Francisco without a loss. Both have records in Opening Day starts of two wins and no losses. Burkett also has a no decision. Zito has the worst record for San Francisco in Opening Day starts, with no wins and two losses. Zito and Marichal have the most losses in Opening Day starts, with two apiece. The Giants have played in the World Series six times since moving to San Francisco, in 1962, 1989, 2002, 2010, 2012 and 2014, winning in 2010, 2012 and 2014. Their Opening Day starting pitchers in those years were Juan Marichal in 1962, Rick Reuschel in 1989, Liván Hernández in 2002, Tim Lincecum in 2010 and 2012, and Madison Bumgarner in 2014. The Giants' Opening Day starting pitchers won four of their six Opening Day starts in those seasons, with their only loss coming in 2012 and a no decision in 2014.

== Key ==
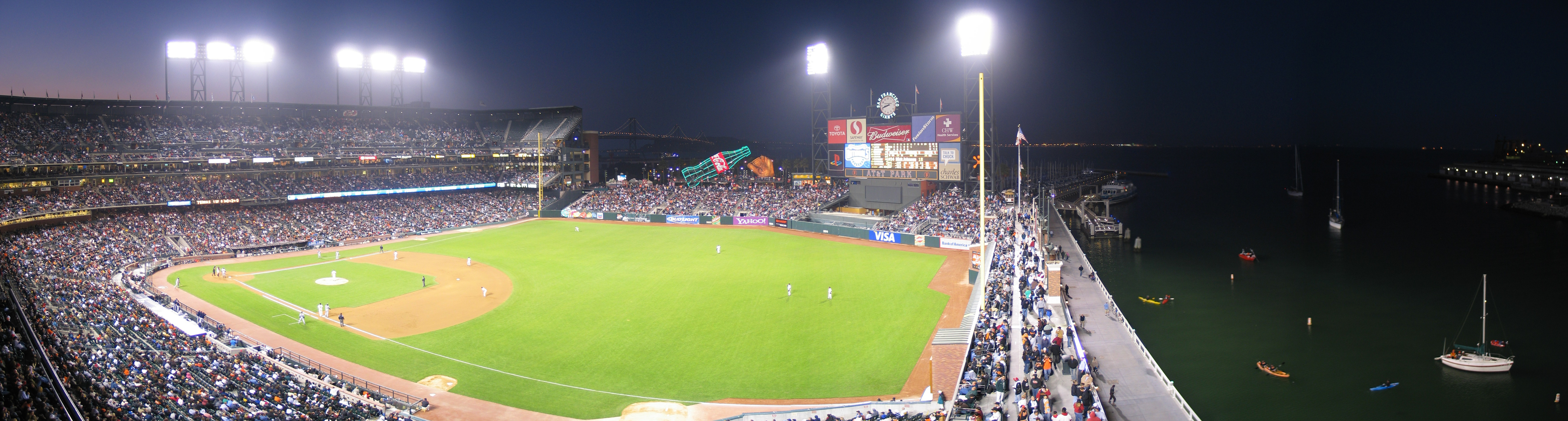
Oracle Park, formerly called Pac Bell Park, SBC Park and AT&T Park, has been the Giants' home field since 2000 and has been the site of three Opening Day games through 2008.

Season	Each year is linked to an article about that particular Giants season.
W	Win
L	Loss
ND (W)	No decision by starting pitcher; Giants won game
ND (L)	No decision by starting pitcher; Giants lost game
Location	Stadium in italics for home game
Pitcher (#)	Number of appearances as Opening Day starter with the Giants
*	Advanced to the post-season
**	NL Champions
†	World Series Champions

== Pitchers ==
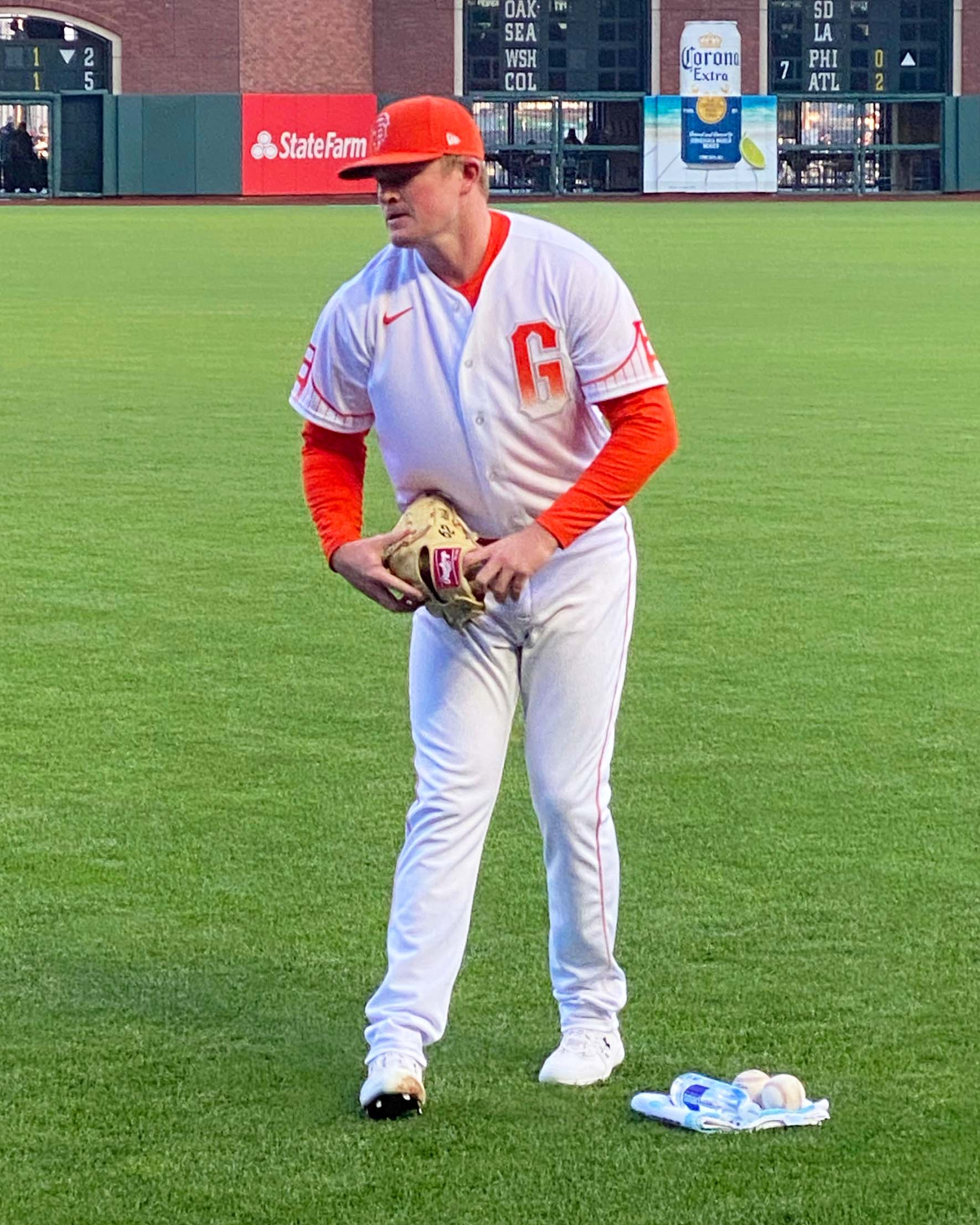
Logan Webb was the Giants' Opening Day starting pitcher in 2022, 2023, 2024, 2025 and 2026.

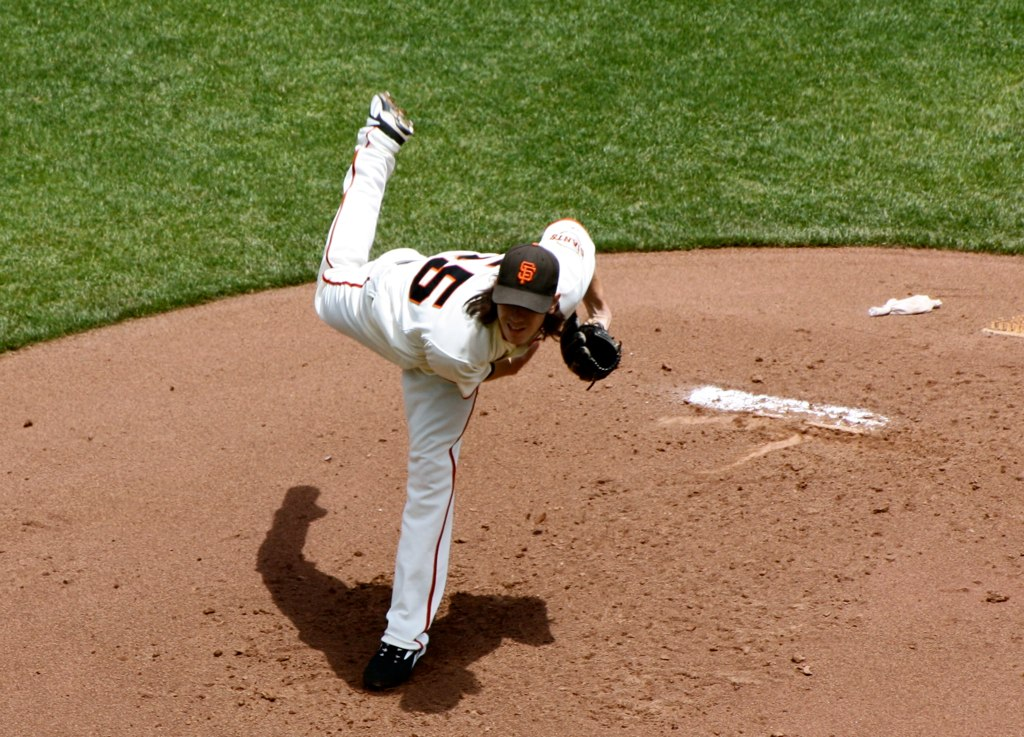
Tim Lincecum was the Giants' Opening Day starting pitcher in 2009, 2010, 2011 and 2012.

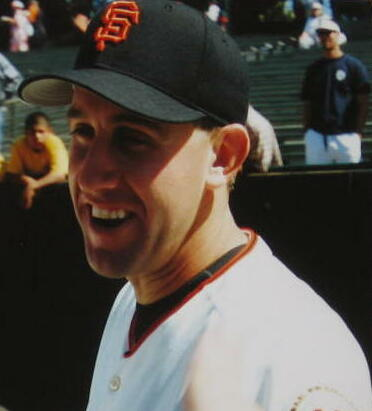
Kirk Rueter was the Giants' Opening Day starting pitcher in 2003 and 2004.

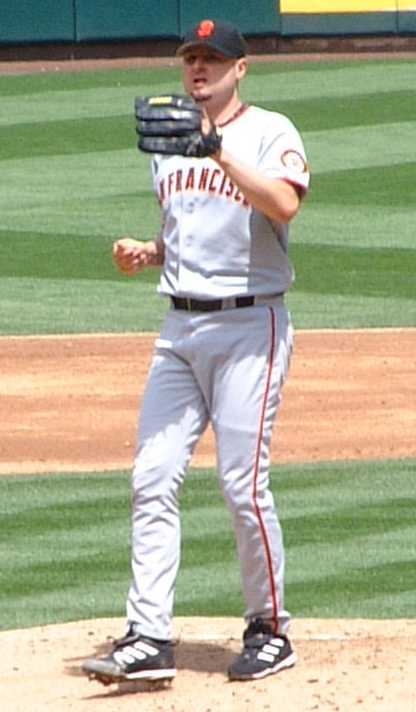
Jason Schmidt was the Giants' Opening Day starting pitcher in 2005 and 2006.

Season	Pitcher	Decision	Final score	Opponent	Location	Ref(s)
1958	Rubén Gómez	W	8–0	Los Angeles Dodgers	Seals Stadium	
1959	Johnny Antonelli^{[a]}	W	6–5	St. Louis Cardinals	Sportsman's Park	
1960	Sam Jones	W	3–1	St. Louis Cardinals	Candlestick Park	
1961	Sam Jones (2)	ND (L)	7–8	Pittsburgh Pirates	Candlestick Park	
1962**	Juan Marichal	W	6–0	Milwaukee Braves	Candlestick Park	
1963	Jack Sanford	W	9–2	Houston Colt .45's	Colt Stadium	
1964	Juan Marichal (2)	W	8–4	Milwaukee Braves	Candlestick Park	
1965	Juan Marichal (3)	L	0–1	Pittsburgh Pirates	Forbes Field	
1966	Juan Marichal (4)	W	9–1	Chicago Cubs	Candlestick Park	
1967	Juan Marichal (5)	L	0–6	St. Louis Cardinals	Busch Stadium	
1968	Juan Marichal (6)	ND (W)	5–4	New York Mets	Candlestick Park	
1969	Juan Marichal (7)	ND (L)	4–5	Atlanta Braves	Atlanta–Fulton County Stadium	
1970	Gaylord Perry	L	5–8	Houston Astros	Candlestick Park	
1971*	Juan Marichal (8)	W	4–0	San Diego Padres	San Diego Stadium	
1972	Juan Marichal (9)	W	5–0	Houston Astros	Astrodome	
1973	Juan Marichal (10)	W	4–1	Cincinnati Reds	Riverfront Stadium	
1974	Tom Bradley	W	5–1	Houston Astros	Candlestick Park	
1975	Jim Barr	W	2–0	San Diego Padres	San Diego Stadium	
1976	John Montefusco	W	4–2	Los Angeles Dodgers	Candlestick Park	
1977	John Montefusco (2)	L	1–5	Los Angeles Dodgers	Dodger Stadium	
1978	John Montefusco (3)	ND (L)	2–3	San Diego Padres	Candlestick Park	
1979	Vida Blue	W	11–5	Cincinnati Reds	Riverfront Stadium	
1980	Bob Knepper	L	4–6	San Diego Padres	San Diego Stadium	
1981	Vida Blue (2)	ND (L)	1–4	San Diego Padres	Candlestick Park	
1982	Al Holland	ND (L)	3–4	Los Angeles Dodgers	Dodger Stadium	
1983	Mike Krukow	L	13–16	San Diego Padres	Candlestick Park	
1984	Mark Davis	L	3–5	Chicago Cubs	Candlestick Park	
1985	Atlee Hammaker	ND (W)	4–3	San Diego Padres	Candlestick Park	
1986	Mike Krukow (2)	W	8–3	Houston Astros	Astrodome	
1987*	Mike Krukow (3)	ND (W)	4–3	San Diego Padres	Candlestick Park	
1988	Dave Dravecky	W	5–1	Los Angeles Dodgers	Dodger Stadium	
1989**	Rick Reuschel	W	5–3	San Diego Padres	Jack Murphy Stadium	
1990	Rick Reuschel (2)	W	8–0	Atlanta Braves	Atlanta–Fulton County Stadium	
1991	John Burkett	ND (L)	4–7	San Diego Padres	Jack Murphy Stadium	
1992	Bill Swift	W	8–1	Los Angeles Dodgers	Dodger Stadium	
1993	John Burkett (2)	W	2–1	St. Louis Cardinals	Busch Stadium	
1994	John Burkett (3)	W	8–0	Pittsburgh Pirates	Candlestick Park	
1995	Terry Mulholland	L	5–12	Atlanta Braves	Atlanta–Fulton County Stadium	
1996	Mark Leiter	L	8–10	Atlanta Braves	Atlanta–Fulton County Stadium	
1997*	Mark Gardner	ND (L)	2–5	Pittsburgh Pirates	Candlestick Park	
1998	Shawn Estes	ND (W)	9–4	Houston Astros	Astrodome	
1999	Mark Gardner (2)	ND (W)	11–8	Cincinnati Reds	Riverfront Stadium	
2000*	Liván Hernández	L	4–6	Florida Marlins	Dolphin Stadium	
2001	Liván Hernández (2)	W	3–2	San Diego Padres	Pac Bell Park	
2002**	Liván Hernández (3)	W	9–2	Los Angeles Dodgers	Dodger Stadium	
2003*	Kirk Rueter	ND (W)	5–2	San Diego Padres	Qualcomm Stadium	
2004	Kirk Rueter (2)	ND (W)	5–4	Houston Astros	Minute Maid Park	
2005	Jason Schmidt	W	4–2	Los Angeles Dodgers	SBC Park	
2006	Jason Schmidt (2)	L	1–6	San Diego Padres	Petco Park	
2007	Barry Zito	L	0–7	San Diego Padres	AT&T Park	
2008	Barry Zito (2)	L	0–5	Los Angeles Dodgers	Dodger Stadium	
2009	Tim Lincecum	ND (W)	10–6	Milwaukee Brewers	AT&T Park	
2010†	Tim Lincecum (2)	W	5–2	Houston Astros	Minute Maid Park	
2011	Tim Lincecum (3)	L	1–2	Los Angeles Dodgers	Dodger Stadium	
2012†	Tim Lincecum (4)	L	4–5	Arizona Diamondbacks	Chase Field	
2013	Matt Cain	ND (L)	0–4	Los Angeles Dodgers	Dodger Stadium	
2014†	Madison Bumgarner	ND (W)	9–8	Arizona Diamondbacks	Chase Field	
2015	Madison Bumgarner (2)	W	5–4	Arizona Diamondbacks	Chase Field	
2016*	Madison Bumgarner (3)	W	12–3	Milwaukee Brewers	Miller Park	
2017	Madison Bumgarner (4)	ND (L)	5–6	Arizona Diamondbacks	Chase Field	
2018	Ty Blach	W	1–0	Los Angeles Dodgers	Dodger Stadium	
2019	Madison Bumgarner (5)	L	0–2	San Diego Padres	Petco Park	
2020	Johnny Cueto	ND (L)	1–8	Los Angeles Dodgers	Dodger Stadium	
2021	Kevin Gausman	ND (L)	7–8	Seattle Mariners	T-Mobile Park	
2022	Logan Webb	ND (W)	6–5	Miami Marlins	Oracle Park	
2023	Logan Webb (2)	L	0–5	New York Yankees	Yankee Stadium	
2024	Logan Webb (3)	ND (L)	4–6	San Diego Padres	Petco Park	
2025	Logan Webb (4)	ND (W)	6–4	Cincinnati Reds	Great American Ball Park	
2026	Logan Webb (5)	L	0–7	New York Yankees	Oracle Park	

== Footnotes ==
- ^{a} Johnny Antonelli had one Opening Day start for the San Francisco Giants in 1959. He also had three Opening Day starts for the New York Giants, in 1955, 1956 and 1957, giving him a total of four Opening Day starts for the Giants' franchise.
