= Tim Lincecum =

American baseball player (born 1984)

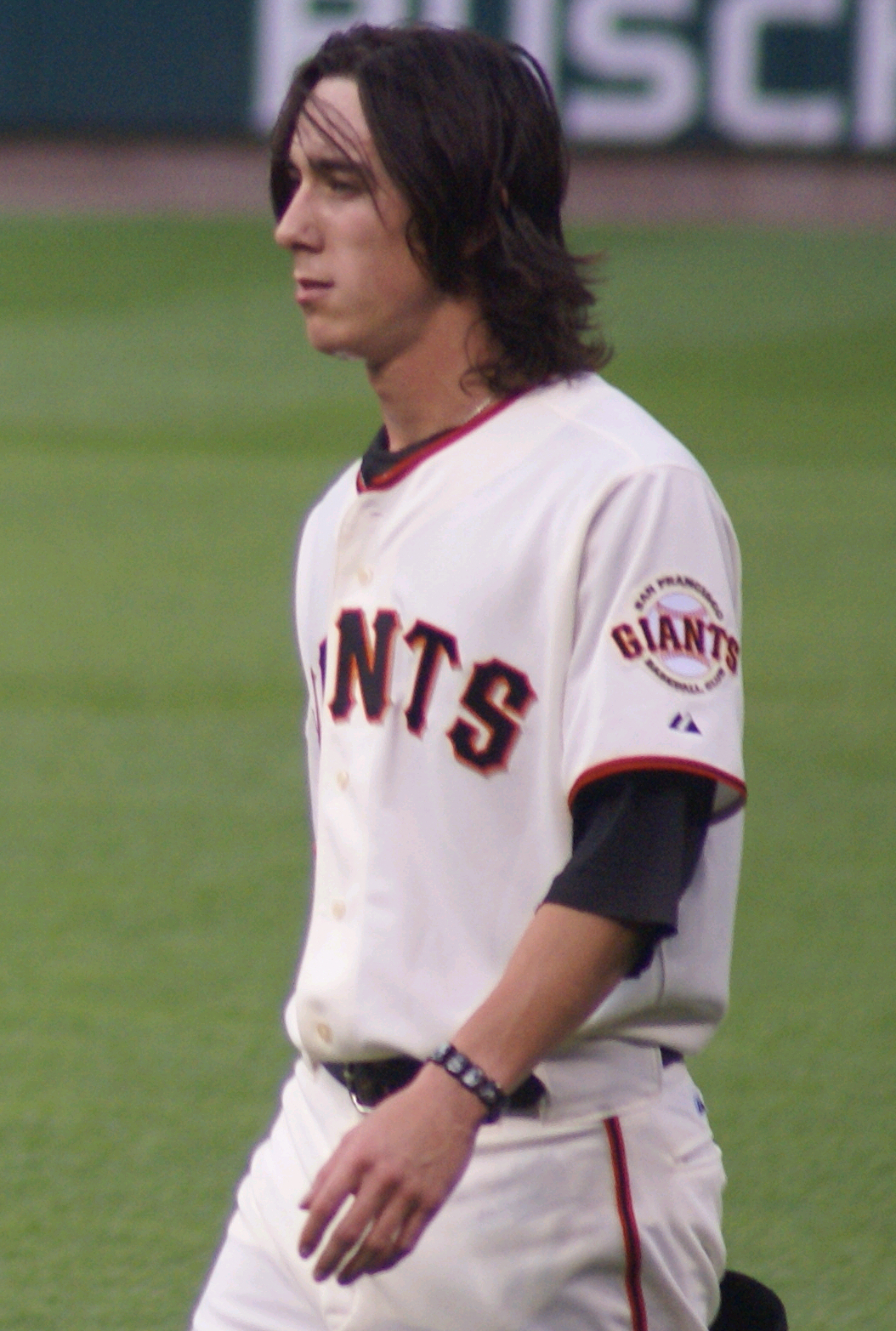
- Lincecum with the San Francisco Giants in 2009
- Pitcher
- Born: June 15, 1984 (age 42); Bellevue, Washington, U.S.
- Batted: Left Threw: Right

MLB debut
- May 6, 2007, for the San Francisco Giants

Last MLB appearance
- August 5, 2016, for the Los Angeles Angels

MLB statistics
- Win–loss record: 110–89
- Earned run average: 3.74
- Strikeouts: 1,736
- Stats at Baseball Reference

Teams
- San Francisco Giants (2007–2015); Los Angeles Angels (2016)

Career highlights and awards
- 4× All-Star (2008–2011); 3× World Series champion (2010, 2012, 2014); 2× NL Cy Young Award (2008, 2009); 3× NL strikeout leader (2008–2010); Golden Spikes Award (2006); Pitched two no-hitters (2013, 2014)

Timothy Leroy Lincecum (/ˈlɪnsəkʌm/ LIN-sə-kum; born June 15, 1984), nicknamed "the Freak", is an American former professional baseball pitcher who played ten seasons in Major League Baseball (MLB), primarily for the San Francisco Giants. A two-time Cy Young Award winner, Lincecum won World Series championships in 2010, 2012, and 2014 as a member of the Giants.

A graduate of Liberty Senior High School in Renton, Washington, Lincecum played college baseball at the University of Washington, where he won the 2006 Golden Spikes Award. That year, Lincecum became the first Washington Husky to be selected in the first round of an MLB draft when the San Francisco Giants selected him tenth overall.

Nicknamed "The Freak" for his ability to generate powerful pitches despite his slight physique (5 feet 11 inches, 170 pounds) and for his unorthodox pitching mechanics, the power pitcher led the National League in strikeouts for three consecutive years in a span from 2008 to 2010. He also led the league in shutouts in 2009 and won the Babe Ruth Award in 2010 as the most valuable player of the MLB postseason. Lincecum won consecutive Cy Young Awards in 2008 and 2009, becoming the first MLB pitcher to win the award in his first two full seasons. He also appeared in four consecutive All-Star Games from 2008 through 2011 and pitched no-hitters in 2013 and 2014. After an injury-plagued 2015 season, he made nine starts for the Los Angeles Angels in 2016. Lincecum returned to baseball in 2018 to sign with the Texas Rangers, but only played for the Rangers' Triple-A affiliate before being released due to injuries.

== Early life ==
Timothy Leroy Lincecum was born on June 15, 1984, in Bellevue, Washington. Lincecum's mother, Rebecca Asis, is the daughter of Filipino immigrants. His father, Chris, worked at Boeing and is distantly related by marriage to actress Natalie Wood. From the age of four, Chris helped his son refine his pitching motion, filming his practices and games and analyzing the video. Lincecum attended Liberty Senior High School in Renton, Washington, where he played two seasons of varsity baseball. As a senior, he was named the state's Player of the Year and led his school to the 2003 3A Kingco Athletic Conference title. He was selected by the Chicago Cubs in the 48th round (1,408th overall) of the 2003 Major League Baseball (MLB) draft, but he did not sign, opting to attend the University of Washington instead.

== College career ==
In both 2004 and 2006, Lincecum was named the Pac-10 Pitcher of the Year for the Washington Huskies. He was selected by the Cleveland Indians in the 42nd round (1,261st overall) upon re-entering the draft in 2005. Again, he did not sign, rejecting an offer including a $700,000 signing bonus as he had been holding out for a larger signing bonus so that his father could retire. He finished 2006 with a 12–4 win–loss record and a 1.94 earned run average (ERA), 199 strikeouts, and three saves in 125 1/3 innings. He was the recipient of the 2006 Golden Spikes Award, which is awarded annually to the best amateur baseball player.

In 2005, Lincecum played collegiate summer baseball for the Harwich Mariners of the Cape Cod Baseball League. He was named a league all-star for Harwich, and posted a 2–2 record with a league-leading 0.69 ERA, striking out 68 batters in 39 innings.

== Professional career ==
=== Draft and minor leagues ===
The San Francisco Giants selected Lincecum with the tenth overall pick in the 2006 MLB draft, becoming the first player from the University of Washington to be taken in the first round. Lincecum's hometown team, the Seattle Mariners, drafted pitcher Brandon Morrow with the fifth overall pick. His $2.025 million signing bonus was, at the time, the most the organization had ever paid to any amateur player. (Note: The Giants gave Angel Villalona a $2.1 million bonus a little over a month later.)

Lincecum made his professional debut in 2006 with the Salem-Keizer Volcanoes of the Single-A short season Northwest League. Going into 2007, he was ranked as the #11 prospect in baseball and the #1 prospect in the San Francisco Giants organization by Baseball America. In the spring of 2007, Colorado Rockies prospect Ian Stewart described Lincecum as tough to face, saying "You can't see the ball at all until it's right on top of you. It gets on you real quick...Guys on our club who have been in the big leagues said he's the toughest guy they ever faced too." Lincecum spent the first month of the season pitching for the Fresno Grizzlies, the Giants' Triple-A affiliate in the Pacific Coast League (PCL). In 31 innings across five starts with the Grizzlies, he allowed just one run, 12 hits, and 11 walks while striking out 46 batters and going 4–0. During his 2006 and 2007 minor league campaigns, Lincecum struck out 30.9% of batters, the highest ratio of any minor league pitcher in the previous ten years.

=== San Francisco Giants (2007–2015) ===
==== Rookie year (2007) ====
After starter Russ Ortiz suffered an inflamed elbow, the Giants called Lincecum up to make his first career Major League start on May 6, 2007, at AT&T Park against the Philadelphia Phillies. Lincecum struck out three batters, all swinging, in his first inning, the first being second baseman Chase Utley, followed by future 2010 World Series champion teammates left fielder Pat Burrell and center fielder Aaron Rowand.

Lincecum earned his first major league win five days later against the Rockies. His next two starts were against the Houston Astros, on May 17 and 22. After the first match-up, Astros third baseman Mike Lamb said, "The stuff he was throwing out there tonight was everything he's hyped up to be. He was 97 mph (156 km/h) with movement. You just don't see that every day. He pitched very much like the pitcher he is compared to and out-dueled him throughout the night." After recording a no decision in the first game, Lincecum pitched eight innings and got the win the second time.

In July, Lincecum went 4–0 with a 1.62 ERA. On July 1, in a seven-inning performance against the Arizona Diamondbacks, he recorded 12 strikeouts and allowed just three hits in a 13–0 victory. Lincecum pitched into the ninth inning for the first time on August 21 against the Cubs, holding a 1–0 lead. He had allowed just two hits and one walk through the first eight, while throwing only 88 pitches. Cubs shortstop and future 2012 World Series champion teammate Ryan Theriot said after the game, "He's got electric stuff. The best stuff I've seen all year."

Lincecum was benched in September as a precaution due to the high number of innings he had pitched in his first full year of professional baseball. Between the minors and the majors, he pitched a total of 177 1/3 innings in the 2007 season.

==== Consecutive Cy Young Awards (2008–2009) ====
The Giants asked Lincecum not to throw bullpen sessions like the ones other pitchers typically throw during the off-season. Bruce Bochy, the manager of the Giants, told the San Francisco Chronicle that the team was being careful with Lincecum because of studies showing that pitchers who throw 200 innings in a season early in their careers are more susceptible to injuries.

From April 2 through April 24, Lincecum won his first four decisions of the 2008 season. On May 15, Lincecum struck out 10 Astros in six innings. Houston first baseman Lance Berkman offered his view of Lincecum: "He has three almost unhittable pitches...When he throws those off-speed pitches where he wants, you've got no chance." After his team fell to Lincecum and the Giants 6–3 on May 27, Diamondbacks first baseman Conor Jackson gave his impression of facing Lincecum: "From what I saw tonight, that's the best arm I've seen all year, no doubt. You've got to almost hit a ball right down the middle. You're going to pop up the ball at your bellybutton, which we all did tonight, and the one down, it's coming in at 98 mph (158 km/h), you're not going to put too much good wood on it. Even the ones down the middle are coming at 98. He's good, man."

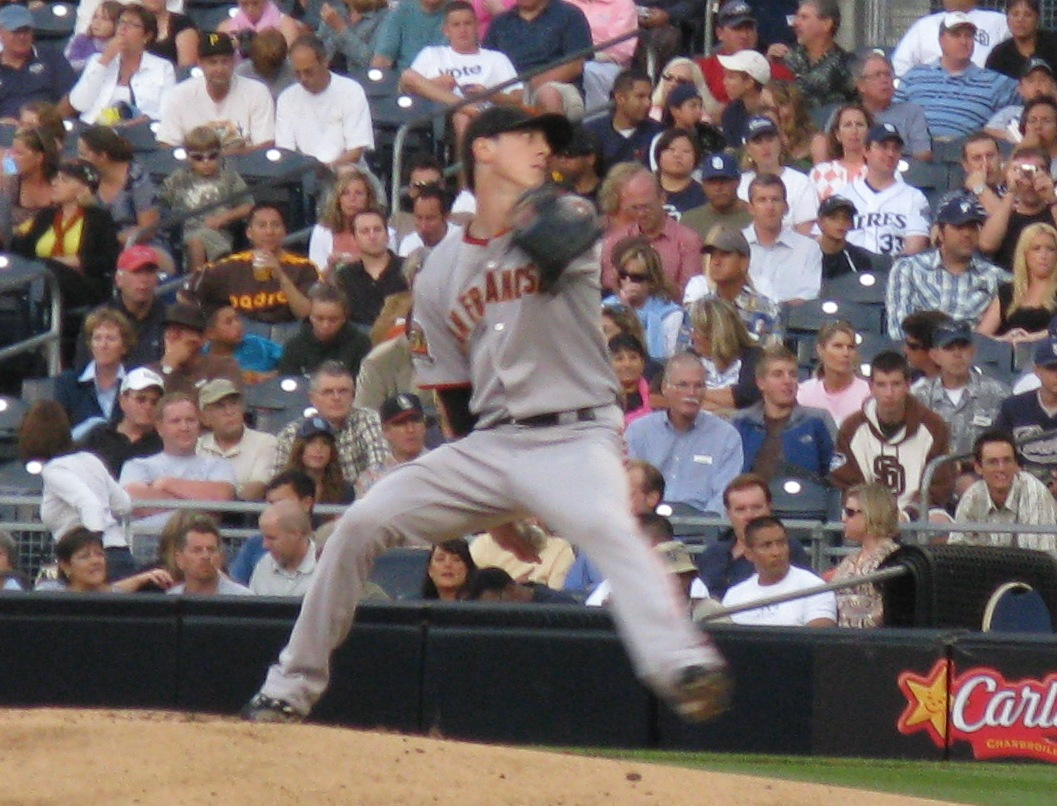
Lincecum pitching on August 1, 2008, in San Diego

Lincecum was on the cover of the July 7, 2008, issue of Sports Illustrated. He was selected to his first All-Star Game, but he was unavailable to play in it because he was hospitalized the day of the game due to flu-like symptoms. In a July 26 game against the Diamondbacks, he struck out 13 batters in seven innings while allowing seven hits, two earned runs, and no walks.

On September 13, Lincecum pitched his first major league shutout against the San Diego Padres. In nine innings, he threw 138 pitches, gave up four hits and struck out 12 batters. Facing the Rockies on September 23, he recorded his 252nd strikeout of the season, breaking Jason Schmidt's 2004 single-season strikeout record. Lincecum finished the season with 265 strikeouts, making him the first San Francisco pitcher to win the National League (NL) strikeout title and the first Giant to do so since Bill Voiselle in 1944. Lincecum won 18 games, losing just five. On November 11, 2008, Lincecum was awarded the NL Cy Young Award, making him the second Giant (after Mike McCormick in 1967) to win the award. He finished 23rd in that year's NL Most Valuable Player (MVP) Award voting.

"People out there said I was too small. It's those kinds of moments that pushed me to be where I'm at right now."

— Tim Lincecum

After losing his first decision of 2009 on April 12 against the Padres, Lincecum won six in a row, not losing again until June 17. On June 2 at Nationals Park, Lincecum struck out Washington Nationals leadoff hitter and shortstop Cristian Guzmán looking in the bottom of the first inning for his 500th career strikeout, becoming the quickest Giants pitcher in franchise history to reach the milestone. In his six June starts, he went 4–1 with a 1.38 ERA and pitched three complete games. On July 3, Lincecum was announced as the NL Pitcher of the Month for June. He and fellow Giants starter Matt Cain were selected to the NL All-Star Team. Lincecum started the game for the NL, allowing two runs (one earned) in two innings pitched in the NL's eventual 4–3 loss.

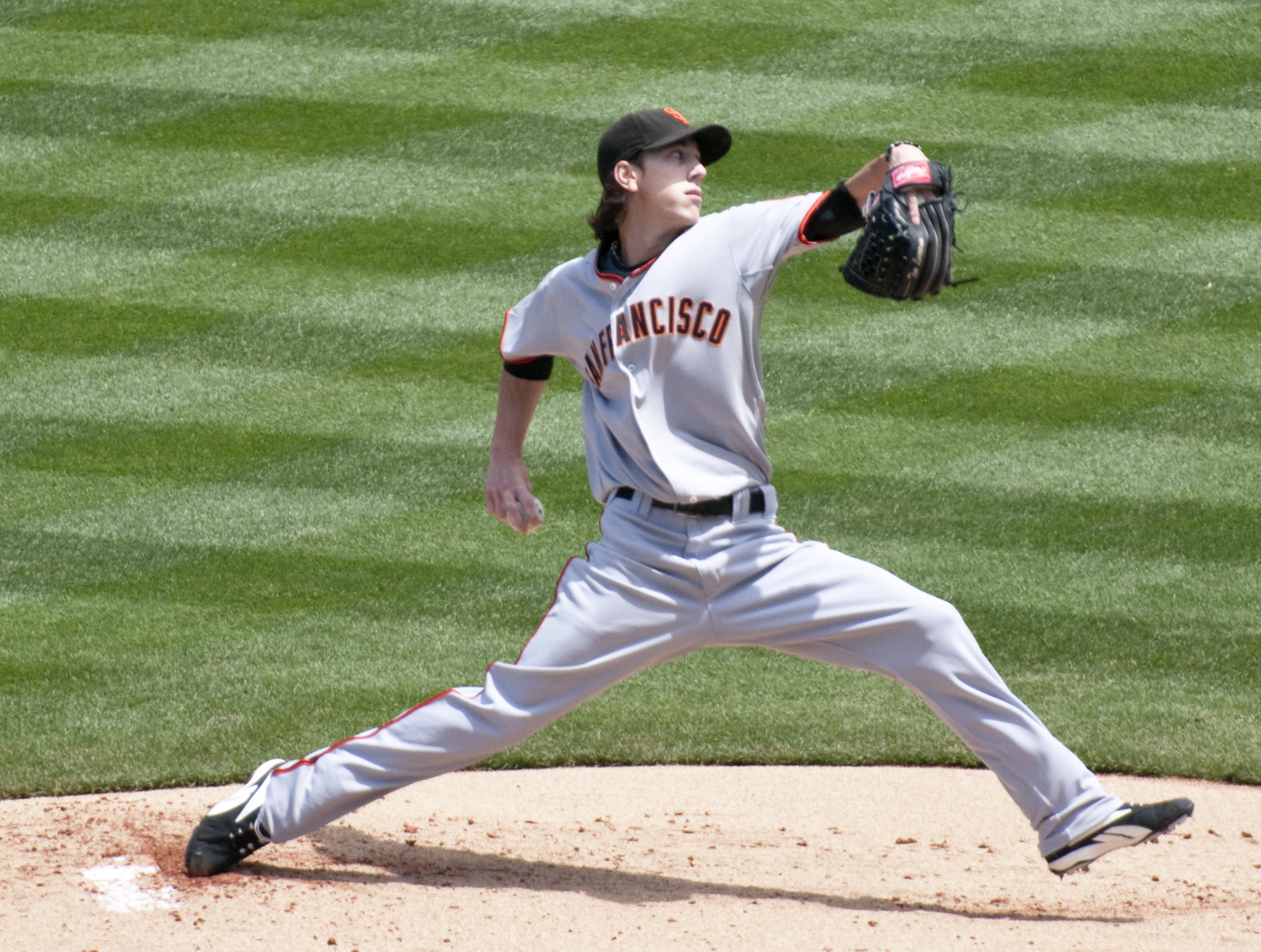
Lincecum in 2009

Through 20 starts in 2009, Lincecum had amassed an 11–3 record with a 2.30 ERA, 183 strikeouts, four complete games, and two shutouts. Lincecum also had a scoreless inning streak of 29 innings, the third-longest streak since the Giants moved to San Francisco from New York City prior to the 1958 season. On July 27, in a 4–2 win over the Pittsburgh Pirates at AT&T Park, Lincecum pitched a complete game and struck out a career-high 15 batters, the second most in San Francisco history (Schmidt struck out 16 in a 2006 game). On August 3, Lincecum was named the NL Player of the Week.

Against the Padres on September 8, Lincecum missed a regularly scheduled start for the first time in his major league career, due to back spasms. Lincecum finished the 2009 season with a 15–7 record, 2.48 ERA and 261 strikeouts. Following the season, Lincecum was named the Sporting News NL Pitcher of the Year for the second consecutive year. On November 19, Lincecum was awarded his second consecutive Cy Young Award, narrowly edging out St. Louis Cardinals pitchers Chris Carpenter and Adam Wainwright. In doing so, he became the first pitcher in MLB history to be awarded the Cy Young in each of his first two full seasons. He finished 18th in NL MVP voting.

On November 24, 2009, it was reported that Lincecum would file for a record $23 million in salary arbitration.

==== First World Series championship and setting records (2010–2011) ====
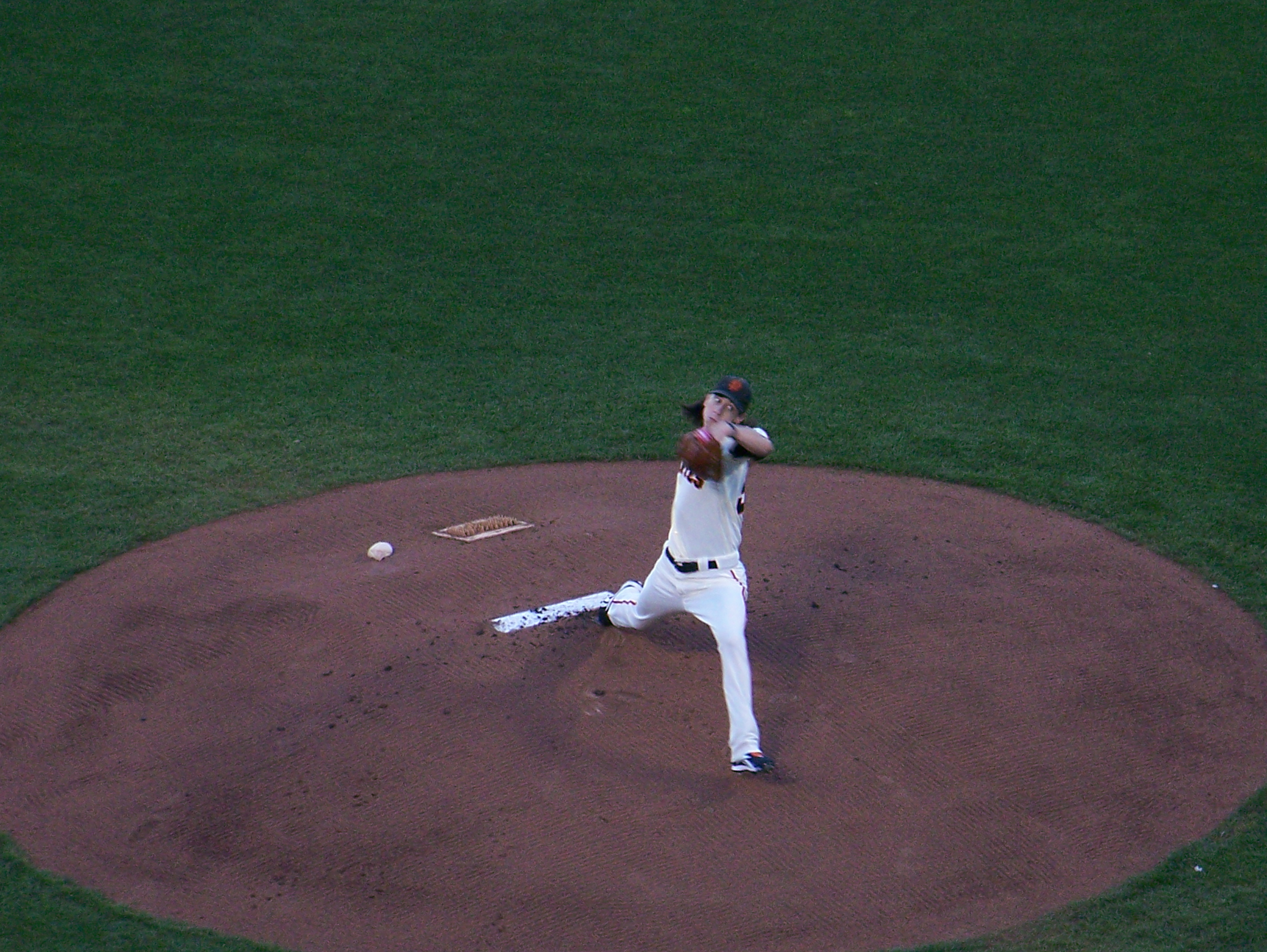
Lincecum in September 2010

On January 19, 2010, the Giants offered Lincecum eight million dollars but he wanted a record $13 million. The two sides could not agree to contract terms, so went to an arbitration hearing. On February 12, 2010, Lincecum signed a two-year, $23 million deal, breaking the previous arbitration record of $22,000,022 by Roger Clemens in 2006. Lincecum helped win his own arbitration case by bringing in and showcasing his two Cy Young Awards in court. Former teammate Kevin Frandsen called it a "pimp move" on MLB Network Radio.

Lincecum started the 2010 season with a 5–0 record, recording 10 or more strikeouts in three of his first six games. However, from May 15 through May 31, he walked five batters in each of four consecutive starts. In June, he improved, striking out 10 hitters again on June 16 in a 6–3 win over the Baltimore Orioles.

For the third year in a row, Lincecum was selected to the NL All-Star Team. As of the All-Star break, Lincecum was 9–4 with a 3.16 ERA over 116 2/3 innings pitched. During the season's first half, he defeated Houston's Roy Oswalt three times in three months. All three games were pitchers' duels.

After a disappointing August in which he experienced a five-game losing streak, Lincecum had a strong outing on September 1. Facing one of the league's top pitchers, Ubaldo Jiménez, Lincecum pitched eight innings of one-run ball for his first win since July 30. He won five games in September, finishing the month 5–1. For the third year in a row, Lincecum won the NL strikeout title; he also set a record for most strikeouts by an MLB pitcher in his first four seasons. Lincecum finished the 2010 regular season with a 16–10 record, a 3.43 ERA and 231 strikeouts.

On October 3 at AT&T Park, in a 3–1 win over the San Diego Padres, the Giants won the National League West Division title on the last day of the regular season. The Giants reached the postseason and clinched their first playoff berth since 2003. In a postgame interview with Comcast SportsNet's Amy Gutierrez, she asked him "Are you ready for your champagne shower?" Lincecum immediately answered "F––– yeah." This soon became a popular internet GIF and San Francisco Giants fans began selling black and orange "F––– YEAH" and "F––– YEAH!" t-shirts online on Depop.

On October 7 at AT&T Park, in a 1–0 win over the Atlanta Braves in Game 1 of the NL Division Series (NLDS), Lincecum pitched a complete-game two-hit shutout and struck out a franchise playoff record 14 batters in his first career postseason start and game. In his next postseason start, Lincecum outdueled fellow Cy Young Award winner Roy Halladay in a 4–3 victory over the Phillies in Game 1 of the NL Championship Series (NLCS). The two squared off again in Game 5 on October 21, in which Lincecum gave up three runs (two earned) over seven innings but suffered the loss in the 4–2 defeat. In Game 6 on October 23, with the Giants clinging to a one-run lead, Lincecum was summoned from the bullpen on one day's rest to pitch the bottom of the eighth inning. He struck out Jayson Werth before surrendering singles to the next two batters. Brian Wilson stranded the runners to end the eighth, and the Giants won the game 3–2, advancing to the World Series. On October 27 at AT&T Park, in Game 1 of the World Series against the American League (AL) champion Texas Rangers, Lincecum committed what he called a "brain fart" in the first inning. With runners at first and third and one out, Lincecum caught Michael Young in a rundown between third base and home. However, instead of throwing towards Pablo Sandoval as he pursued Young to the bag, Lincecum kept the ball himself, allowing Young to scamper back safely. A double play helped him end the inning with only one run scoring, and though he ran into trouble in the next inning, Texas only managed to score one more run. The Giants tied the game in the third, then added six runs in the sixth, taking an 8–2 lead before Lincecum allowed two more runs in the sixth and departed. He earned the win in an eventual 11–7 triumph.

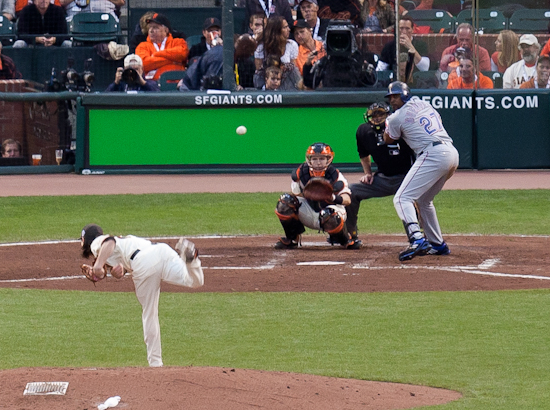
Lincecum pitching in Game 1 of the 2010 World Series

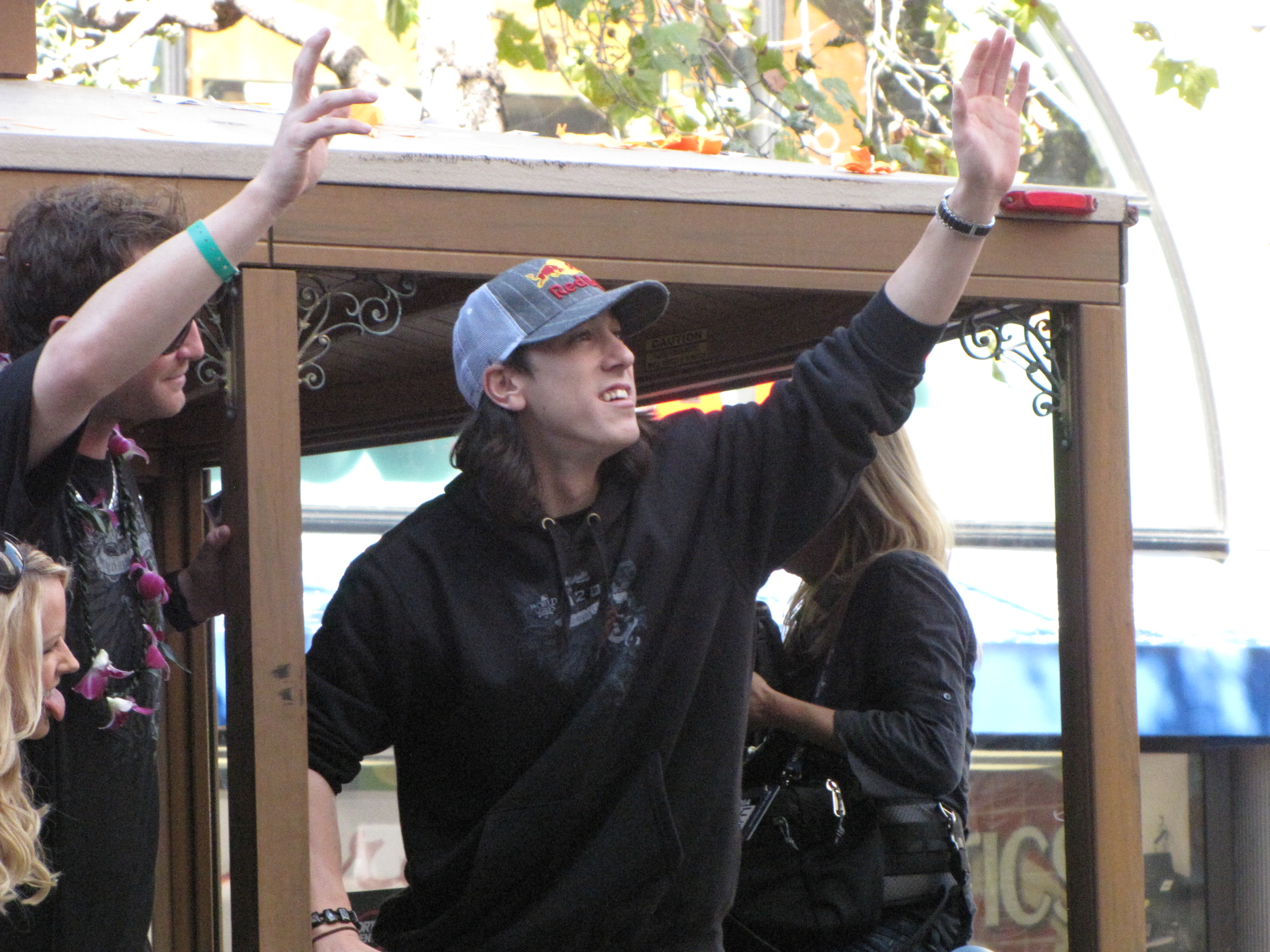
Lincecum in the 2010 World Series parade

On November 1 at Rangers Ballpark in Arlington, with the Giants leading the Series three games to one, Lincecum started and was the winning pitcher in the clinching Game 5. He struck out a franchise World Series record 10 batters in eight innings while giving up only three hits en route to a 3–1 victory. The win ended the Giants' 56-year drought between World Series championships and also gave San Francisco its first baseball world championship.

On May 4, 2011, Lincecum struck out twelve New York Mets, becoming the Giants franchise record holder for most games pitched with 10 or more strikeouts. Lincecum's total of 29 such games surpassed Hall of Fame "first five" inaugural member Christy Mathewson. While Mathewson accumulated his 28 ten-plus-strikeout games in 551 starts over 17 seasons with the Giants, Lincecum recorded 29 such games in 129 starts over five seasons. On May 21, he threw a three-hit shutout against the Oakland Athletics as San Francisco won 3–0. On June 6 at AT&T Park, Lincecum struck out Washington Nationals third baseman Jerry Hairston Jr. swinging to end the top of the second inning for his 1,000th career strikeout, becoming the fastest Giants pitcher in franchise history to reach the milestone. Lincecum was met with a large standing ovation from his loving fans as he came off of the mound and was congratulated by his coaches and teammates as he walked down into the dugout.

Despite having the fourth-lowest ERA in the NL (2.74), including a second-half ERA of 2.31, Lincecum finished the 2011 season with a 13–14 record. Lincecum's so-so win–loss record was largely due to his receiving the worst run support in the major leagues; the Giants scored no runs in ten of his outings and scored two runs or fewer in 21 of them, making Lincecum one of only six pitchers in modern major league history to have at least 200 strikeouts, an ERA of less than 2.75, and a losing record.

==== Second World Series championship (2012) ====
Lincecum reportedly rejected San Francisco's offer of a five-year, $100 million extension before the 2012 season. In January 2012, he instead signed a two-year, $40.5 million deal with the Giants, leaving him eligible for free agency after the 2013 season.

Lincecum's career began a downturn in 2012. After winning back-to-back games on April 23 (against the Mets) and 28 (against the Padres), he lost six decisions in a row, not winning again until he threw seven shutout innings against the Los Angeles Dodgers on June 22. At the All-Star break, he had a 3–10 record and a 6.42 ERA.

However, Lincecum improved in the second half of the season, winning seven of his last 12 decisions and posting a 3.83 ERA. In his first game after the All-Star break, he pitched eight shutout innings and struck out 11. Closer Santiago Casilla gave up two runs in the 9th inning, but the Giants won 3–2. He finished the season with a 10–15 record and 190 strikeouts. The 190 strikeouts were 10th-best in the NL, but Lincecum also led the league in losses (15) and wild pitches (17; highest total in MLB). His 5.18 ERA for the season was nearly double what it had been the year before.

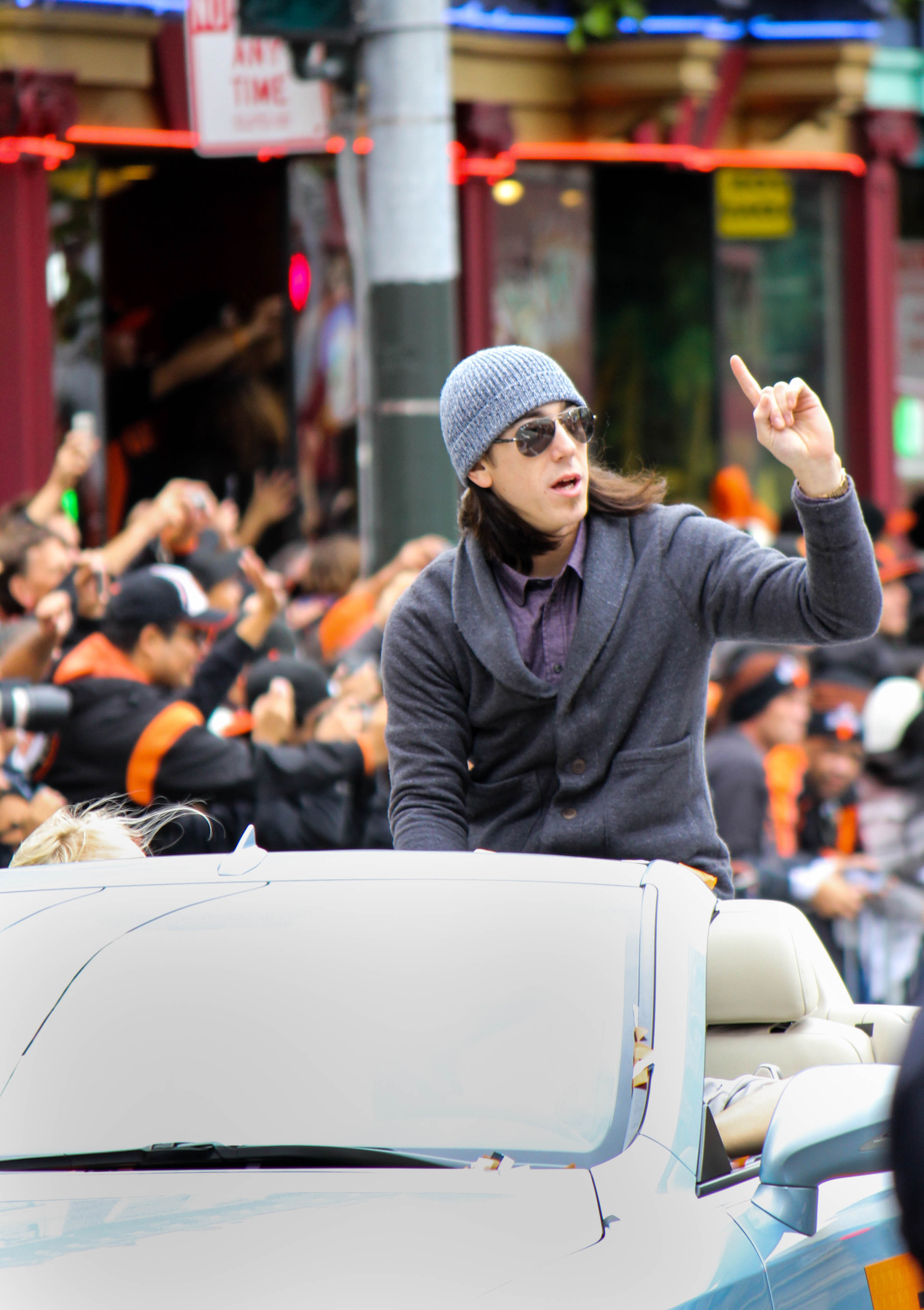
Lincecum in the 2012 World Series parade

With the Giants only needing four starters for the playoffs, Lincecum was used as a relief pitcher in the postseason. In Game 2 of the NLDS against the Cincinnati Reds, Lincecum threw two shutout innings, though the Giants would lose 9–0. He picked up the win in Game 4 of the NLDS, throwing 4 1/3 innings of relief and allowing just one run as the Giants won 8–3 to force a deciding Game 5, which they would also win. After Lincecum pitched two hitless innings in Game 1 of the NLCS against the Cardinals, Bochy decided to give him the start in Game 4. Lincecum gave up four runs in 4 2/3 innings, taking the loss in San Francisco's 8–3 defeat. That loss put the Giants down three games to one in the series, but they won the next three games, advancing to the World Series for the second time in three years. In Game 1 of the World Series, Lincecum relieved Barry Zito with two outs in the sixth inning, getting the last out and throwing two further scoreless innings as the Giants defeated the Detroit Tigers by a score of 8–3. Lincecum relieved Ryan Vogelsong with two outs in the sixth inning of Game 3, again throwing 2 1/3 scoreless innings, this time in a 2–0 victory. The Giants swept the Series for their second title in three seasons.

==== Third World Series championship and no-hitters (2012–2015) ====
During the 2012 offseason, Lincecum used a conditioning program to improve his coordination. His performance in spring training in 2013 was lackluster, as he posted a 10.57 ERA. Cain and Madison Bumgarner were both ahead of him in the rotation to start the season. On July 13 at Petco Park, in a 9–0 win over the San Diego Padres, Lincecum threw his first career no-hitter. The first no-hitter ever pitched in that ballpark, he struck out 13 batters, hit one by a pitch, and walked four. He threw a career-high 148 pitches, which were the second most number of pitches ever thrown in a no-hitter, after the 149 that Edwin Jackson threw in his June 25, 2010 no-hitter. The 13 strikeouts were the second-most by a Giant in pitching a no-hitter, after the 14 in Matt Cain's perfect game a year earlier. Lincecum, the losing pitcher in Homer Bailey's second career no-hitter only eleven days earlier, became the first no-hit pitcher to also be the losing pitcher in another no-hitter during the same season since the Giants' Juan Marichal in 1963, as well as the first pitcher since Bill McCahan in 1947 to hurl a no-hitter after being on the losing end of the last no-hitter before it. The #FreakNoHitter hashtag became popular on social media. Lincecum finished the first half of his season with a losing record (5–9), but his 4.26 ERA was lower than what it had been in the first half of 2012 (6.42).

On September 20 at Yankee Stadium, Lincecum struck out New York Yankees center fielder Curtis Granderson swinging in the bottom of the second inning for his 1,500th career strikeout, becoming the fastest Giants pitcher in franchise history to reach the milestone.

Lincecum pitched to an ERA of 4.54 in the second half of the 2013 season; however, the Giants bullpen accounted for an unusually high 12 earned runs charged to Lincecum. In 32 starts in 2013, Lincecum went 10–14 with a 4.37 ERA, striking out 193 in 197 2/3 innings. By the end of the year, he had 1,510 strikeouts, the third-highest total by a pitcher over his first seven years (behind Tom Seaver's 1,655 and Bert Blyleven's 1,546). On October 22, Lincecum signed a two-year, $35 million contract, which prevented him from becoming a free agent.

With Tim Hudson joining the Giants in 2014, Lincecum fell to fourth in the Giants rotation to start the year. On May 12, Lincecum struck out 11 in 7 2/3 one-run innings as the Giants defeated the Braves 4–2. He had a no-hitter going against the Cubs on May 28 but was removed after five innings, partly because a blister was forming on his middle finger. The no-hitter lasted until the seventh, when John Baker recorded a hit against Jeremy Affeldt, but the Giants still won 5–0. On June 25, Lincecum pitched his tenth career complete game and second career no-hitter. It was his second against the Padres and the third no-hitter in the short history of AT&T Park. With his second no-hit performance against the Padres, Lincecum became the second player in MLB history to throw two no-hitters against the same team (joining Hall of Famer Addie Joss) and the first in Major League history to do it in back-to-back seasons. Against the Phillies on July 22, Lincecum inherited runners at second base and third base with only one out in the 14th inning of a game the Giants led 9–5 over the Phillies. Only the runner at third scored, as Lincecum recorded the final two outs. With the save, Lincecum became the fifth pitcher since 1976 to pitch a no-hitter and record a save in the same season, joining Matt Garza, Chris Bosio, Jerry Reuss, and John Candelaria.

After posting a 9.49 ERA in six games from July 25 through August 23, Lincecum was replaced in the Giants rotation by Yusmeiro Petit. Bochy initially indicated that the move might only be for one start, but Lincecum would spend the rest of the season in the bullpen. On September 25 at AT&T Park, in a 9–8 comeback win over the San Diego Padres, Lincecum won his 100th career game and the Giants clinched a Wild Card berth. Every year the Giants won the World Series, they secured a playoff spot by defeating the San Diego Padres. Lincecum threw two pitches (the fewest total for a pitcher's 100th career win), retiring Alexi Amarista to end the seventh inning, then became the pitcher of record as the Giants took the lead in the bottom of the inning. In 33 games (26 starts), he had a 12–9 record, a 4.74 ERA, and 134 strikeouts in 155 2/3 innings pitched.

Lincecum was the only player on the Giants' 25-man roster who was not used during the NLDS and the NLCS. He finally made an appearance in Game 2 of the 2014 World Series against the Kansas City Royals, entering to start the bottom of the seventh inning and retiring all five batters he faced. Lincecum left the game in the eighth inning with lower back tightness. He did not pitch again in the series, but the Giants defeated the Royals in seven games, giving Lincecum the third World Series championship of his career.

Through May 3, 2015, Lincecum posted a 2–2 record, a 2.40 ERA, 20 strikeouts, and 11 walks in 30 innings pitched. He threw eight shutout innings in a victory over the Los Angeles Angels on May 3, then struck out eight over six shutout innings in a win over the Miami Marlins on May 8. On May 20, in a 4–0 win over the Dodgers, Lincecum pitched seven shutout innings and passed Hall of Famer Carl Hubbell for fourth place in franchise history on the Giants all-time career strikeouts list. On June 27, Lincecum was hit in his pitching elbow with a line drive off the bat of DJ LeMahieu and left the game with an injury. He was diagnosed with a degenerative condition in both hips in July and was given cortisone shots. Still not having pitched since June 27, Lincecum underwent season-ending hip surgery on September 3. For the season, he was 7–4 with a 4.13 ERA and 60 strikeouts. He became a free agent after the season.

=== Los Angeles Angels (2016) ===
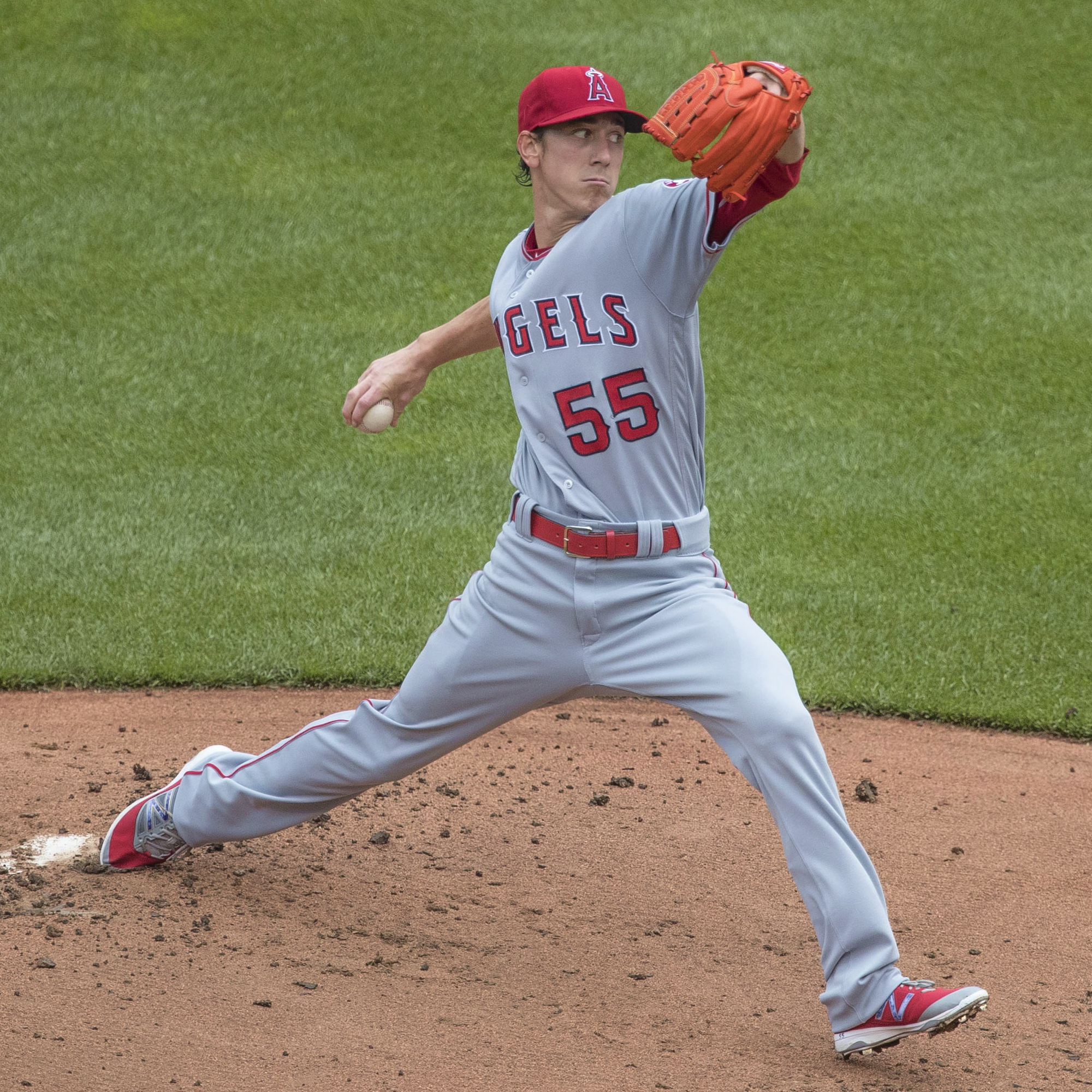
Lincecum with the Los Angeles Angels in 2016

On May 6, 2016 at Scottsdale Stadium, Lincecum held a private pitching showcase, throwing 41 pitches in front of MLB club representatives and scouts. Three teams were interested in him, including the Los Angeles Angels, Chicago White Sox, and Giants. On May 20, 2016, Lincecum signed a one-year, $2.5 million contract with the Angels. He was optioned to the Triple-A Salt Lake Bees of the PCL on May 22 for a rehab assignment. On June 18, after being called up to start in Oakland, Lincecum gave up one run in six innings to earn a victory in his Angels debut. However, he would only win one more game for the Angels all season, allowing five runs (three earned) in five innings on July 19 in an 8–6 victory over the Rangers. Facing the Seattle Mariners on August 5, he allowed nine hits and six runs in 3 1/3 innings, taking the loss in the 6–4 defeat. The Angels designated Lincecum for assignment the next day, and he accepted an option to Salt Lake on August 9. In September, even though major league rosters expanded from 25 to 40 players, the Angels decided not to recall Lincecum. He finished his major league season with a 2–6 record and a 9.16 ERA, allowing 68 hits and 23 walks over 38 1/3 innings pitched. With the Bees, he had an 0–3 record and a 3.76 ERA in seven starts. He became a free agent after the season.

=== Texas Rangers ===
After sitting out the 2017 season, Lincecum signed a one-year contract with the Texas Rangers on March 7, 2018. Rangers' general manager Jon Daniels said the team planned to use him as a relief pitcher. Lincecum began the season on the 60-day disabled list after suffering a blister on his right middle finger during spring training. Eventually, he made 10 appearances for the Round Rock Express of the PCL, posting a 5.68 ERA and walking nine batters in 12 2/3 innings. He was released by the Rangers on June 5, 2018.

== Career overall ==
=== Statistics and achievements ===
Category	Years	WAR	W	L	ERA	G	GS	CG	SHO	SV	IP	H	R	ER	HR	BB	IBB	SO	HBP	ERA+	FIP	WHIP	H9	SO9	Ref.
Total	10	19.9	110	89	3.74	278	270	10	7	1	1,682.0	1,506	746	699	147	669	33	1,736	44	104	3.45	1.293	8.1	9.3	

== Post-playing career ==
In September 2019, Lincecum appeared at a postgame ceremony held by the Giants to mark Bochy's final game as the team's manager. In an interview at the ceremony, Lincecum acknowledged that he had not formally retired from baseball and was "trying to transition". He added, "I think the hardest part was coming to grips with who I was after baseball, and I haven't even done it fully yet".

== Pitching style ==
Tim Lincecum mechanics
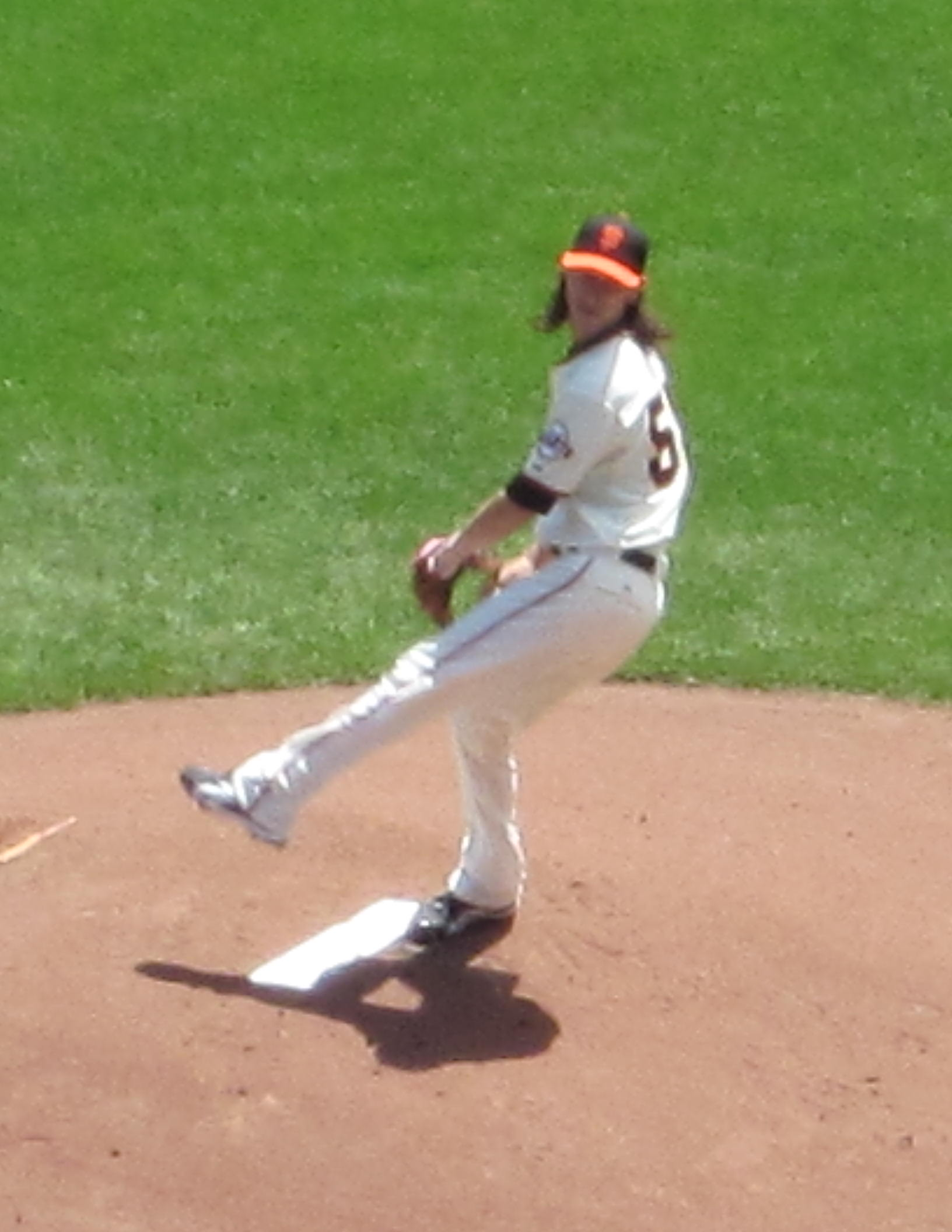

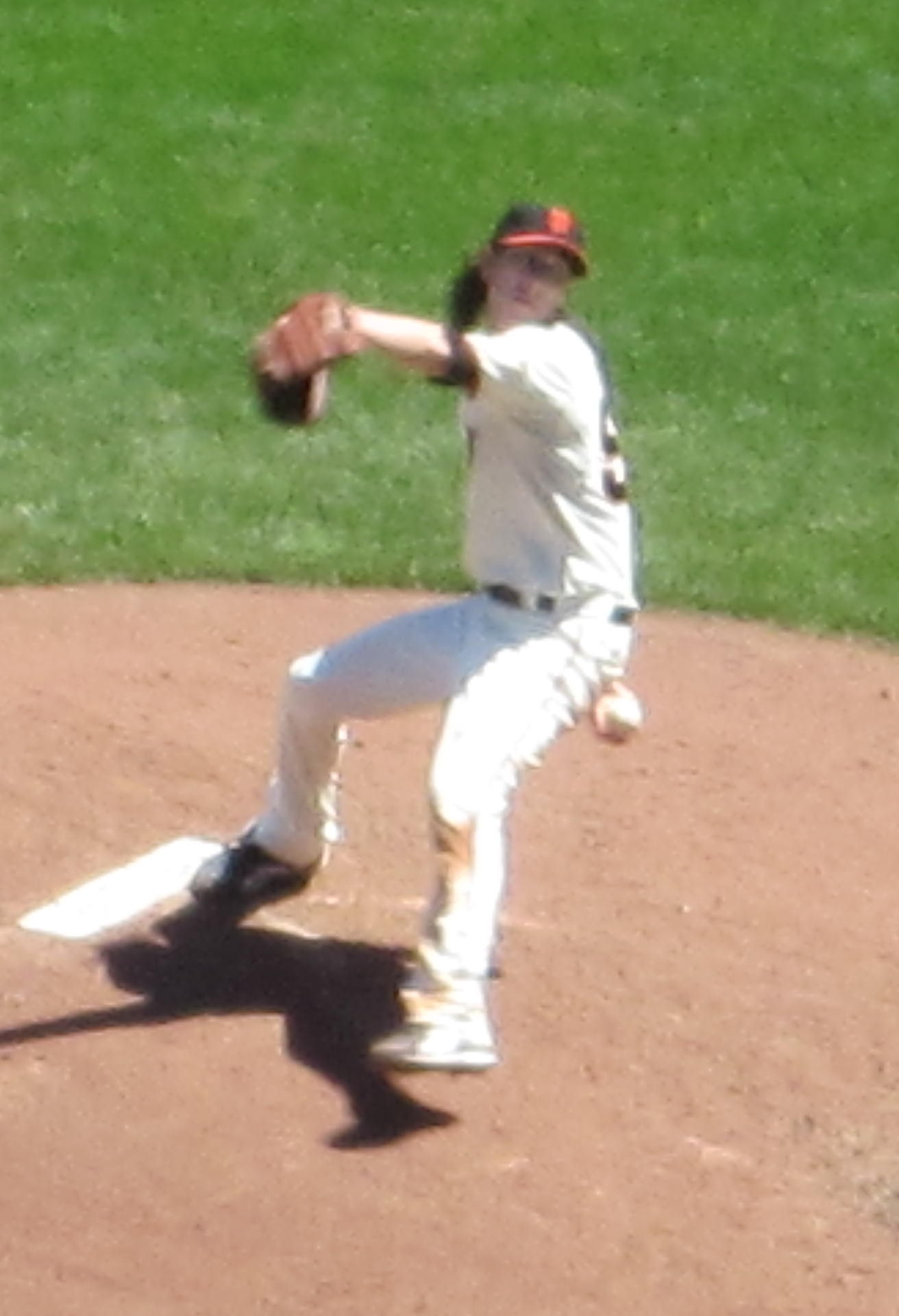

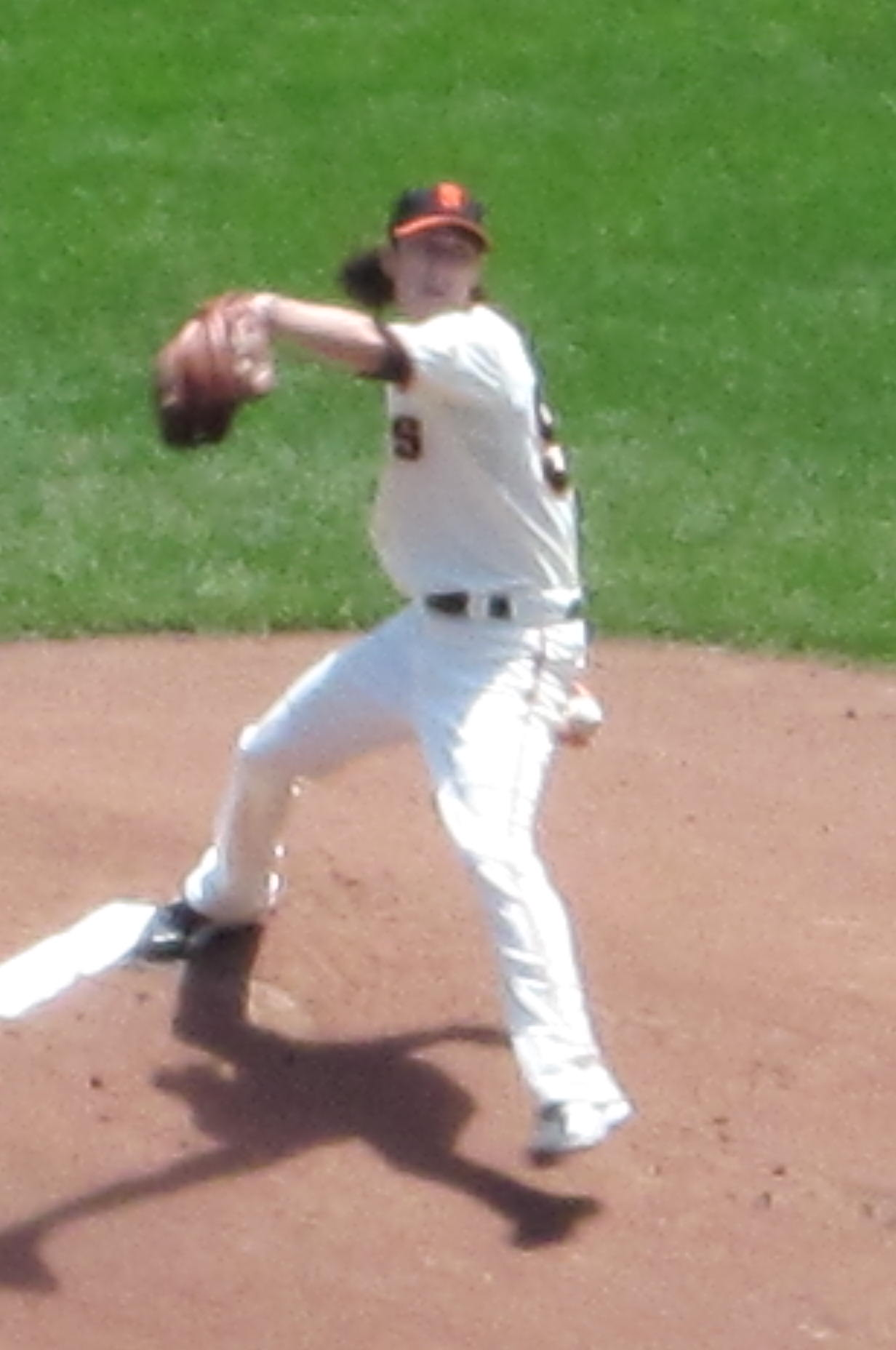

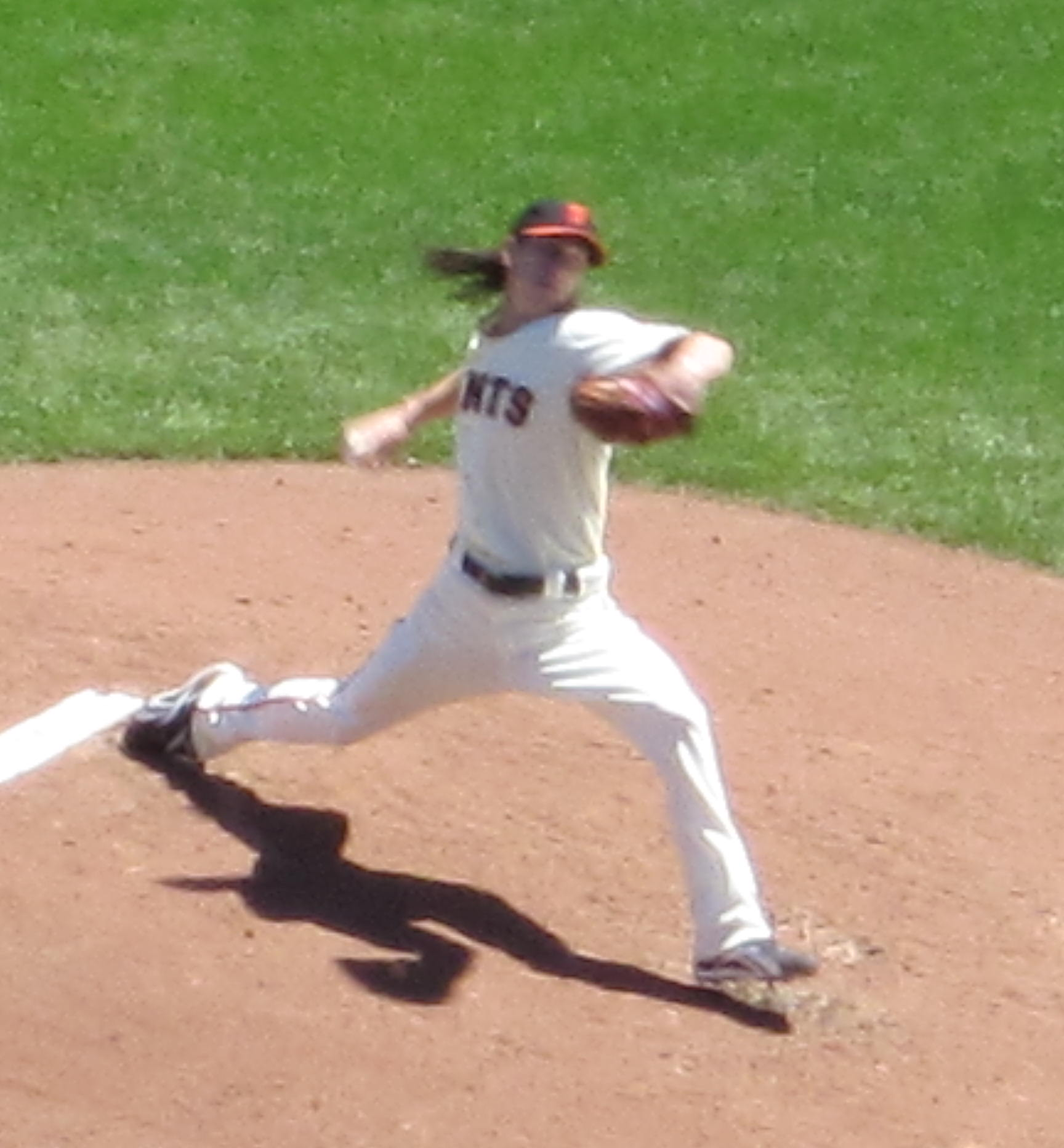

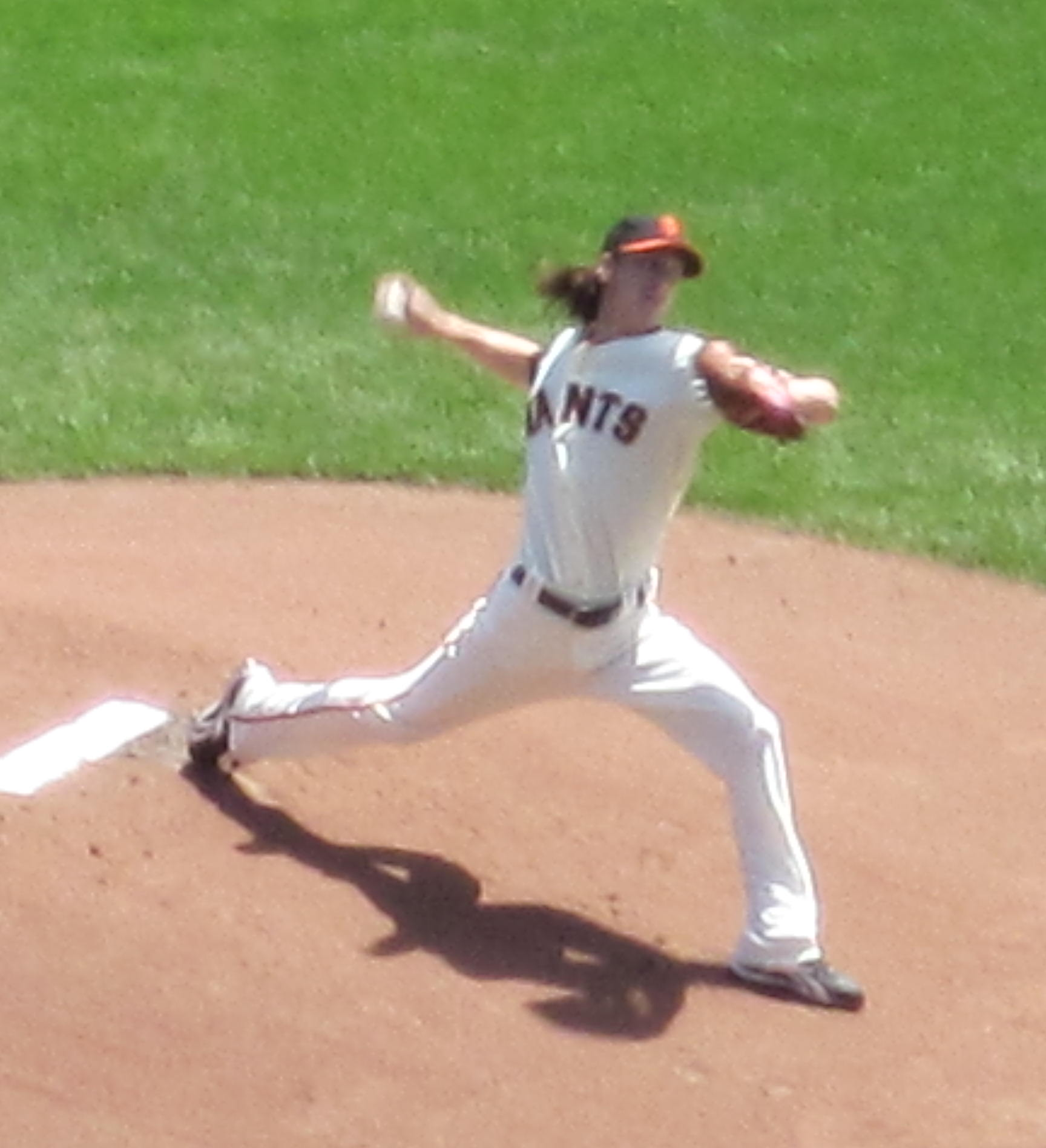

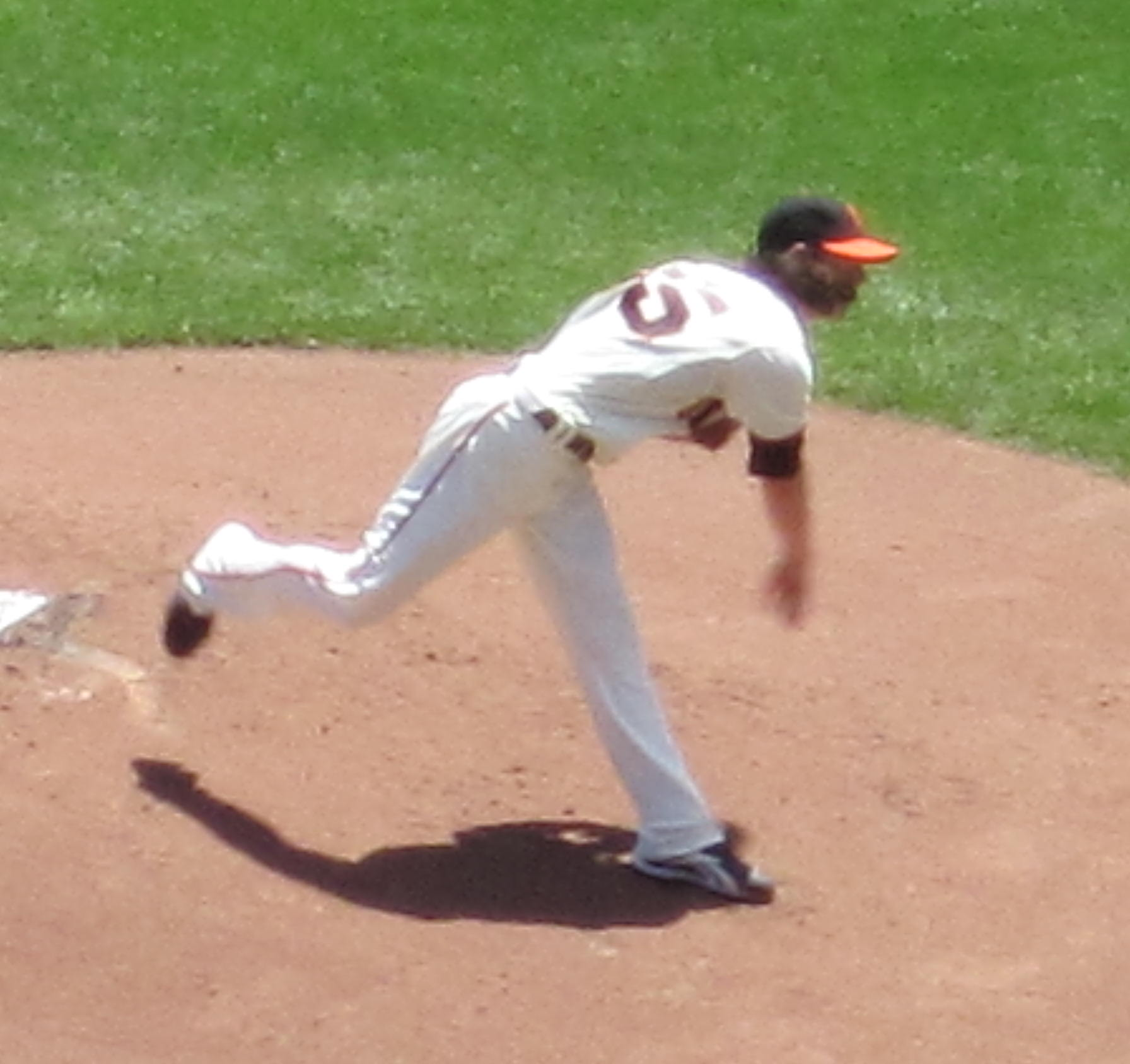

When pitching, Lincecum would start with his back slightly to the plate, his left leg raised, and his glove held over his head. Then, he would take a step of about seven feet forward, maneuvering his hips over the place his left foot was now planted as he released the ball. This helped him to generate high velocity despite his slight build. The power behind the throws was generated not just from the arm, but also from the long stride and the hip muscles. Sportswriters Bob Nightengale and Robert Falkoff both thought that Lincecum was a similar pitcher to Roy Oswalt.

Lincecum threw a four-seam fastball, but mostly used a two-seam fastball which he threw for more sinking movement to get more ground balls. This pitch had little lateral movement due to his overhand delivery and the speed at which the pitch was thrown. He had a curveball which broke away from right-handed hitters. These were his primary pitches when he first reached the major leagues, but as his career progressed, he added two more. In 2007, he added a changeup with a grip similar to that of a split-finger fastball. A fast pitch, his changeup appeared similar to his fastball for the first 30 feet (9.1 m), but then dove down sharply and tailed away from left-handed batters. The changeup was his favorite pitch to throw with two strikes. He had thrown a slider in college, and he started using it again in 2008, throwing it far more often by 2011. The slider was a pitch he used when ahead in the count, as he preferred to rely on his fastball when he was behind. He reached 99 mph (159 km/h) with his fastball in rookie year. The fastball averaged 94.1 miles per hour (151.4 km/h) in 2008 and 92.4 miles per hour (148.7 km/h) in 2009, but by 2014 it was averaging less than 90 miles per hour (140 km/h). His other pitches were typically in the high-70/low-80 mph range (approximately 128.75 km/h); these also slowed slightly as his career progressed.

== Legacy ==
"One of these characters is Tim Lincecum. Where's Tim? I see him back there. Recognize the hair. When Tim entered the draft five years ago, nine teams passed him over before the Giants picked him up. Nobody thought somebody that skinny with that violent a delivery could survive without just flying apart. But now, with two Cy Youngs under his belt, everybody understands why he's called "The Freak." Before Game 5 last year, Tim was so relaxed he was singing in the clubhouse. That's how his teammates knew they were about to see something special. And after watching him pitch eight incredible innings, including a stretch of 11 strikes in a row, America learned sometimes it's a good idea to bet on the skinny guy. So, you and me."

— President of the United States Barack Obama remarks on Lincecum

Lincecum's 2010 season was the best by a starting pitcher on San Francisco's first World Series championship team. He helped spark a dynasty. Former rotation mate Cain wrote an autobiographical article published on October 3, 2017, on The Players' Tribune. Cain pinpointed Lincecum's Major League debut as the exact day the Giants dynasty started.

The Giants have not reissued Lincecum's number 55.

== Career highlights ==
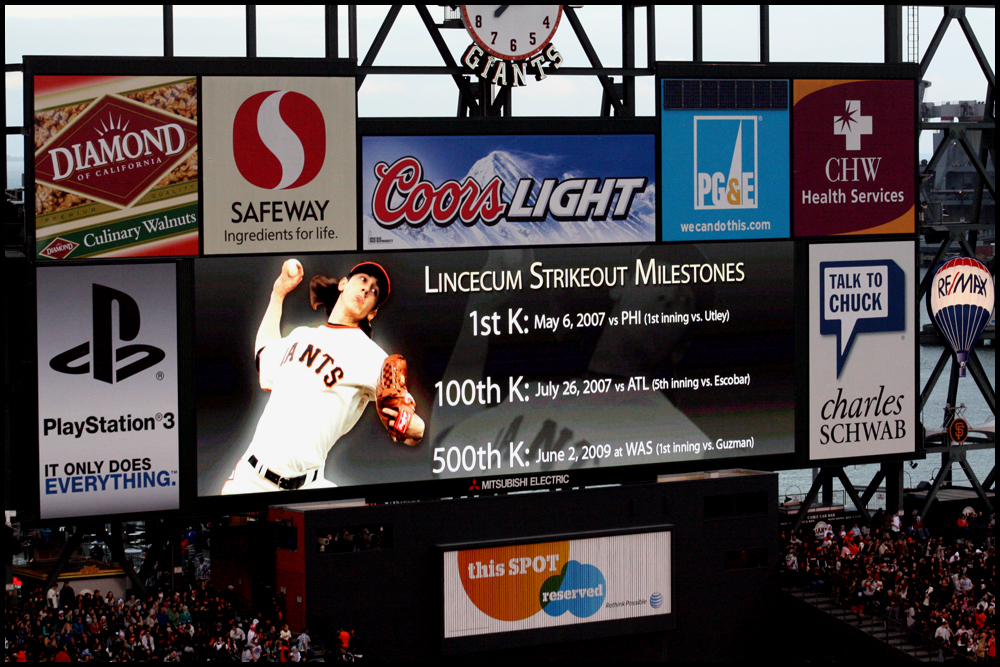
Lincecum's strikeout milestones

=== Awards ===
Award / Honor	Time(s)	Date(s)
World Series Champion	3	2010, 2012, 2014
Babe Ruth Award	1	2010
NL Champion	3	2010, 2012, 2014
NL Cy Young Award	2	2008–2009
The Sporting News' NL Pitcher of the Year Award	2	2008–2009
NL strikeouts leader	3	2008–2010
NL shutouts leader	1	2009
NL All-Star	4	2008, 2009, 2010, 2011
MLB All-Star Game NL Starting Pitcher	1	2009
NL Pitcher of the Month	1	June 2009
NL Player of the Week	3	2009, 2013–2014
Major League Baseball Starter of the Year	1	2008
Players Choice Award for NL's Outstanding Pitcher	1	2008
San Francisco Giants Opening Day starting pitcher	4	2009–2012
Major League Baseball 2K9 and Major League Baseball 2K9 Fantasy All-Stars Cover Athlete	1	2008
Golden Spikes Award	1	2006
Collegiate Baseball Newspaper National Freshman of the Year	1	2004
Pac-10 Pitcher of the Year	2	2004, 2006
Pac-10 Freshman of the Year	1	2004
Pac-10 Pitcher Of The Week	1	2005
Gatorade Washington State Baseball Player of the Year	1	2003

Lincecum was included on the ballot for the National Baseball Hall of Fame class of 2022 when it was announced on November 22, 2021.

== MLB Records ==
=== Regular season records ===
- No-hit repeat against the same franchise/team (San Diego Padres) in back-to-back seasons. (2013–2014)
- No-hit repeat against the same franchise/team (tied with Addie Joss).
- Multiple no-hitters thrown, multiple Cy Young Awards won (shared with Sandy Koufax, Randy Johnson, Justin Verlander, Max Scherzer, and Roy Halladay).
- Multiple no-hitters thrown, multiple Cy Young Awards won, multiple World Series championship titles (shared with Sandy Koufax, Justin Verlander, and Max Scherzer).

== Personal life ==
While he was with the Giants, Lincecum lived in the Mission District area of San Francisco, steps away from the old Seals Stadium site. During the off-season, he lived in Seattle. He has owned property in Paradise Valley, Arizona. As of 2011, Lincecum had a pet French Bulldog named Cy. In 2022, his family had a bulldog named Charlie Bean.

In 2014, the Sacramento Bee described Lincecum as the most beloved San Francisco sports figure since Joe Montana. Because of his "small size and unorthodox pitching delivery, he is an unlikely figure to have reached the pinnacle of his sport", which the Bee believes reflects the success of the Giants. Fox Sports in 2014 called him a "local legend and crowd favorite, now and forever." Lincecum was nicknamed "The Freak" by his college teammates because of his athletic abilities and his ability to generate powerful pitches from his athletic but slight physique. Giants fans continued to refer to him by the moniker during his time with the team.

On October 30, 2009, a police officer pulled Lincecum over in Washington for speeding and discovered the pitcher with 3.3 grams (0.12 oz) of marijuana, which was illegal under state law at the time. He was cited for marijuana possession that November. San Francisco Giants fans made custom t-shirts that read "LET TIMMY SMOKE" with a pot leaf behind it and were sold online on eBay. On August 5, 2010, at Turner Field, Lincecum made three appearances at the plate against Atlanta Braves pitcher Jair Jurrjens. Each time he came to bat, their organist Matthew Kaminski played "Puff, the Magic Dragon." "I didn’t realize it until someone told me after the game." Lincecum said.

Lincecum appeared in a 2010 This is SportsCenter commercial. In it, he attempted to record a voicemail greeting on his phone, telling callers that they had reached "The Freak", "The Franchise", "The Freaky Franchise", and "Big Time Timmy Jim". He was dissatisfied with each attempt, particularly the last because "No one calls me that." Finally, he decided to record one beginning simply "Hi. This is Tim Lincecum. If you leave your name, number, and a short message, I'll be-" – only to be interrupted by Karl Ravech walking by and saying "Hey, Big Time Timmy Jim! What's up?"

Lincecum is a fan of the NFL's Seattle Seahawks. On December 19, 2010, at Lumen Field, (then known as CenturyLink Field), Lincecum was the 12th MAN Flag Raiser, honoring the 12s before the Seahawks' home game in Seattle.

Lincecum's wife, Cristin Coleman, was a schoolteacher and principal. She died of cancer on June 27, 2022, at age 38.

== Activism ==
=== Philanthropy ===
In 2011, Lincecum donated $25,000 to the Bryan Stow Fund to honor the service of firefighters, police officers, and paramedics. Stow is a Giants fan and had recently been beaten badly by Los Angeles Dodgers' fans outside of Dodger Stadium.

== See also ==
- List of World Series champions
- List of World Series starting pitchers
- List of Major League Baseball annual strikeout leaders
- List of Major League Baseball annual shutout leaders
- List of Major League Baseball no-hitters
- List of San Francisco Giants Opening Day starting pitchers
- List of San Francisco Giants no-hitters
- List of San Francisco Giants seasons
- List of San Francisco Giants team records

== Sources ==
- Baggarly, Andrew (2011). A Band of Misfits: Tales of the 2010 San Francisco Giants. Chicago: Triumph Books. ISBN 978-1-60078-598-6. OCLC 773565513 – via Internet Archive.

Awards and achievements
Preceded by Chris Young	NL hits per nine innings leader 2008	Succeeded by Clayton Kershaw
Preceded by Chris Young	NL opponent batting average leader 2008	Succeeded by Clayton Kershaw
Preceded by Ben Sheets	National League All-Star Game starting pitcher 2009	Succeeded by Ubaldo Jiménez
Preceded by Homer Bailey; Clayton Kershaw	No-hitter pitcher July 13, 2013; June 24, 2014	Succeeded by Henderson Álvarez; Cole Hamels, Jake Diekman, Ken Giles, and Jonathan Papelbon
