= Sports-related curses =

List of sports superstitions

A sports-related curse is a superstitious belief in the effective action of some malevolent power that is used to explain the failures or misfortunes of specific sports teams, players, or cities. Teams, players, and cities often cite a "curse" for many negative things, such as their inability to win a sports championship, or unexpected injuries.

== American football ==
=== Detroit Lions ===
In 1958, the Detroit Lions traded Bobby Layne to the Pittsburgh Steelers, with Layne responding to the trade by supposedly saying that the Lions would "not win for 50 years". The veracity of this story has been disputed, particularly because the quote was never published at the time.

Despite this, in the 50 years after the trade, the Lions accumulated the worst winning percentage of the 12 teams in the National Football League (NFL) at the time, and are still one of only two franchises that were in the NFL prior to 1966 that have not yet played in the Super Bowl. The Lions' lone playoff win, prior to the 2023–24 season, came against the Dallas Cowboys following the 1991 season.

When the Pittsburgh Steelers won their fifth Super Bowl championship in 2006, they won it at Ford Field, the Lions' current home stadium. Two years later – in the last year of the supposed curse – the Steelers won their sixth Super Bowl championship, while the Lions finished 0–16, the first team to lose every game of a 16-game season.

After the 2023–24 season, the Lions won a Wild Card spot, and were able to defeat the Los Angeles Rams 24–23 to advance to the divisional round, where they defeated the Tampa Bay Buccaneers 31–23 to advance to the NFC Championship Game, where they faced the San Francisco 49ers. During halftime, the Lions held a 24–7 lead, but the 49ers rallied to tie the game in the third quarter, helped by a turnover on downs at the 49ers’ 28-yard line and a crucial fumble by running back Jahmyr Gibbs at the Lions’ 24-yard line, which allowed the 49ers to even the game at 24–24. In the fourth quarter, the Lions were unable to recover an onside kick late in the game, and eventually lost 34–31. This comeback mirrored that of the Lions win over the 49ers in the 1957 NFL playoffs, where they coincidentally overcame a 24–7 deficit to beat the 49ers 31–27.

In the 2024–25 season, the Lions got out to their best start in franchise history since their inaugural 1934 season at 12–2, including a franchise record win streak of eleven straight victories and winning all of their regular season road games for the first time in franchise history. However, the team was decimated by injuries to 22 players (coinciding with the Jersey number Layne used while playing with the Lions), with the most notable injury being to star defensive end Aidan Hutchinson, who suffered a season-ending leg injury during the Lions’ Week 6 matchup against the Dallas Cowboys in Bobby Layne's home state of Texas, just seven days removed from the anniversary of Layne being traded to the Steelers. Despite all of this, the Lions finished the season with a 15–2 record, tied for the best in the NFL, swept their division for the first time in franchise history, and earned the number one seed in the playoffs for the first time in franchise history. However, in their first playoff game in the divisional round, the Lions were upset by the Washington Commanders, 45–31, plagued by five turnovers, a crucial twelve men on the field penalty late in the third quarter that led to a Commanders touchdown, allowing Washington to go 4-for-4 on fourth down conversions, and the possible distractions of having both their offensive and defensive coordinators interview for head coaching positions during the team's bye week, which both eventually took after the Lions' loss.

=== Kirk Cousins ===
The Kirk Cousins curse refers to a curse in which an NFL team who has lost to quarterback Kirk Cousins has failed to win a Super Bowl since he entered the league in 2012. The curse first started to take effect in 2016 when Cousins, as a member of the Washington Redskins (now the Washington Commanders) defeated the Green Bay Packers and New York Giants. The Giants would go on to lose 38–13 in the wild card to the Packers, and the Packers went on to lose the NFC Championship game to the Atlanta Falcons.

In 2023, the Green Bay Packers and San Francisco 49ers lost to Cousins in the regular season. The Packers were eliminated by the 49ers, and the curse nearly took effect for the 49ers in the NFC Championship game against the Detroit Lions when they trailed 24–7 before rallying to win the game. With the win, the 49ers became the first team to lose to Kirk Cousins in the regular season and reach the Super Bowl. However, the 49ers lost Super Bowl LVIII to the Kansas City Chiefs, keeping the curse fully intact. However, the curse was broken when the Philadelphia Eagles, who lost to the Atlanta Falcons (who were led by Kirk Cousins at the time) during the 2024 season, dominated the Chiefs (who ironically beat the Falcons when Cousins was leading them) 40–22 in Super Bowl LIX.

=== Pottsville Maroons ===
The Pottsville Maroons curse refers to a long-standing legend tied to the 1925 NFL Championship controversy. That year, the Pottsville Maroons defeated the Chicago Cardinals on the field and were widely considered the rightful champions. However, the NFL stripped Pottsville of the title after the team played an unauthorized exhibition game against Notre Dame in what the league claimed was another team’s protected territory. As a result, the championship was officially awarded to the Cardinals, despite the fact that Pottsville had beaten them head-to-head.

Over time, fans and historians began referring to a "curse" on the Cardinals, suggesting that the team’s decades of championship struggles were karmic fallout from benefiting unfairly at Pottsville’s expense. The Cardinals did not win another NFL championship after 1947, and the franchise endured long periods of losing seasons and relocations. While the curse is more folklore than fact, it remains a popular part of NFL lore, symbolizing unresolved grievances and the sense that Pottsville’s lost title still haunts the now-Arizona Cardinals’ history.

=== Madden NFL ===
Prior to 1999, every annual installment of the Madden NFL video game franchise primarily featured John Madden on its cover. In 1999, Electronic Arts selected San Francisco 49ers running back Garrison Hearst to appear on the PAL version's cover, and has since featured one of the league's top players on every annual installment despite Madden's opposition. While appearing on the cover has become an honor akin to appearing on the Wheaties box, much like the Sports Illustrated cover jinx, certain players who appeared on the Madden video game box art have experienced a decline in performance, usually due to an injury.

=== Super Bowl ===
The Super Bowl curse or Super Bowl hangover is a phrase referring to one of two things that occur in the National Football League (NFL): Super Bowl participant clubs that follow up with lower-than-expected performance the following year, and NFL teams that do not repeat as Super Bowl champions.

The phrase has been used to explain both why losing teams may post below-average winning percentages in the following year and why Super Bowl champions seldom return to the title game the following year. The term has been used since at least 1992, when The Washington Post commented that "the Super Bowl Curse has thrown everything it's got at the Washington Redskins. The Jinx that has bedeviled defending champs for 15 years has never been in better form". The phenomenon is attributed by football commentator and former NFL manager Charley Casserly to such elements as "a shorter offseason, contract issues, [and] more demand for your players' time". Casserly also notes that "once the season starts, you become the biggest game on everybody's schedule." Alleged curse notwithstanding, multiple teams have indeed repeated as Super Bowl champions, including the Green Bay Packers in the first two Super Bowls, the Pittsburgh Steelers twice in the 1970s, the Miami Dolphins also in the 1970s, the San Francisco 49ers in 1989 and 1990, the Dallas Cowboys in the 1990s, the Denver Broncos also in the 1990s, the New England Patriots in the 2000s, and the Kansas City Chiefs in the 2020s. Additionally, there are multiple cases of teams reaching the conference championship or further up to four times in a row, including the mid-1980s Cleveland Browns, 1990s Cowboys and Buffalo Bills, the 2000s Philadelphia Eagles, early 2010s San Francisco 49ers, the late 2010s-early 2020s Kansas City Chiefs (the latter two coached by Andy Reid), and most notably the 2010s New England Patriots who went to 8 straight AFC title games from 2011 through 2018, including three straight Super Bowl appearances from 2016 to 2018 winning two of them (Super Bowl LI) at the end of the 2016 season and Super Bowl LIII following the 2018 season.

== Association football ==
=== Aaron Ramsey ===
Online users and tabloid journalists have written of a "Curse of Ramsey", in which celebrities die within hours or days of Welsh footballer Aaron Ramsey scoring regardless of where he plays. The phenomenon has been brought up after high-profile deaths such as those of Ted Kennedy, Andrés Montes, Osama bin Laden, Muammar Gaddafi, Steve Jobs, Whitney Houston, Paul Walker, Robin Williams, Morkos Hakim, Liz Holzman, David Bowie, Alan Rickman, Nancy Reagan, Kenneth Kaunda, Chester Bennington, Grand Armee, Robbie Savage, Tommy Smith, Gregg Allman, Roger Moore, Stephen Hawking, Eric Bristow, Burt Reynolds, Mac Miller, Jimmy Buffett, George H. W. Bush, Keith Flint, Luke Perry, Courtney Cox Cole, Gugu Liberato, Hosni Mubarak, Max von Sydow, Sanford Wheeler, Gimax, Mohd Azizan Baba, Eva Castillo, June Brown, Olivia Newton-John, Steve Harwell, Elizabeth II, Bray Wyatt, Pope Francis, Graham Greene, Giorgio Armani, Charlie Kirk, Dolly Parton, Tim Curry, Harald V and Patrick Stewart. All coming in short time periods after every match where Ramsey scored or won as a manager.

=== Alianza Lima ===
Since 2000, teams that have drawn with Peruvian outfit Alianza Lima will not become the champions of Copa Libertadores, a fear that has become popularised by Argentine media since the 2020s as the "curse of Alianza" and has since become trend among South American football fans that any teams that face Alianza from the group stage are doomed not to win the most prestigious South American trophy. River Plate came closest in breaking the curse, but lost to Flamengo 2–1 in the 2019 Copa Libertadores Final.

=== Argentina national team (The curse of Tilcara) ===
Before the 1986 FIFA World Cup, the Argentina national football team’s manager Carlos Bilardo, along with the players found a place called Tilcara, in which to prepare for the tournament. Bilardo prayed to the Virgin of Copacabana and promised that if Argentina won the World Cup, they would come back and thank the virgin for his work. Argentina went on to win the World Cup a month later but Bilardo and his team did not keep their promise.

Their ungratefulness was believed to have led to a curse, which started during the 1990 FIFA World Cup, where Argentina lost to Cameroon in a shock surprise upset. They did go on to reach the final but were defeated by West Germany.

From then, Argentina were knocked out of further World Cups, starting with Romania in the 1994 round of 16, the 1998 quarter-finals against the Netherlands, 2002 in the group stage, three defeats to Germany in the quarter-finals in 2006 and 2010 and the 2014 final and against France in the 2018 round of 16. Their Copa América campaigns did not fare much better after the 1993 edition, where they were runners-up four times in 2004, 2007, 2015 and 2016 and finished third in 2019, as well as being humiliatingly eliminated by Uruguay in the 2011 quarter-finals on home soil.

Bilardo attempted to deny any involvement, but the local populace confirmed the team's arrival, angering a portion of Argentine fans who accused the 1986 winners of betraying their promises. Because of this, the remaining players of the 1986 squad would eventually return to Tilcara in March 2018 to redeem for their failure to honour the promises and asked for forgiveness. Afterwards, Argentina won four major tournaments in a row: the 2021 Copa América, the 2022 Finalissima, the 2022 FIFA World Cup and the 2024 Copa América, finally breaking the curse.

=== Australia national team ===
In a story told in Johnny Warren's 2002 autobiography, Sheilas, Wogs and Poofters, during a trip to play against Rhodesia (now Zimbabwe) in the 1970 Mexico World Cup qualifiers in Mozambique, members of the Australia national soccer team (nicknamed the "Socceroos"), including Warren, consulted a witch doctor preceding their game. The witch doctor buried bones near the goal-posts and cursed the opposition, and Australia went on to beat Rhodesia 3–1 in the decider. However, the move backfired when the players could not come up with the £1000 demanded by the witch doctor as payment, so he cursed their team instead. Subsequently, the Socceroos failed to beat Israel and did not qualify.

Whilst the curse is used as an explanation for Australia failing to qualify for the World Cup for 32 years, including in the last match in the 1994, 1998 and 2002 qualifications, it is used in particular reference to the circumstances in which they failed to qualify for the 1998 tournament: needing a win against Iran in the final match of qualification, they drew 2–2, despite having led 2–0 in the second half of the match.

The curse was lifted by John Safran during episode 7 of his 2004 TV series John Safran vs God. After reading the story in Warren's book, Safran travelled to Mozambique and hired a new witch doctor to channel the original to reverse the curse. The following year, the Socceroos not only qualified for the 2006 World Cup, but reached the round of 16 before being beaten by eventual champions Italy in Kaiserslautern. The Socceroos have since qualified for the 2010, 2014, 2018, 2022 and 2026 World Cups, with the 2022 saw Australia's most successful World Cup performance up to date. Interestingly, the two of three most recent qualifications saw Australia triumphed at the play-offs despite the harsh opponents they faced (Honduras in 2018 and Peru in 2022).

Australia did appear in the 1974 FIFA World Cup after the curse had been placed. However, they failed to score a goal in any of their three opening round matches, and were eliminated.

=== Bayer Leverkusen ===
German Bundesliga club Bayer 04 Leverkusen were given the nicknames "Neverkusen", "Vizekusen" (vize meaning "second" in German) and "Bridesmaid of Europe" for its record during the 1990s to 2000s of reaching finals of major tournaments but failing to win, or finishing runner-up in the league. Bayer were runners-up in the Bundesliga for three out of four seasons between 1998–99 and 2001–02 and as of the 2022–23 season, not to win the title. The nicknames were popularised after the 2001–02 season when the club finished runner-up in the two major domestic competitions (league and cup) and the Champions League. Additionally, the German national team which finished runner-up to Brazil at the 2002 FIFA World Cup featured five Leverkusen players. However, after years of struggling to get more wins in the Bundesliga, Leverkusen finally won their first league title in its history without losing a game in the 2023–24 Bundesliga season, thus finally ending the Neverkusen curse.

=== Benfica ===
Béla Guttmann, a former Hungarian footballer and then manager, joined Benfica in 1959 and coached the Portuguese club to two Primeira Liga titles, one Portuguese Cup and two European Cups. In 1962, after his second European Cup title, he reportedly asked for a pay raise but had his request turned down despite the great success he achieved at the Lisbon club, also having his contract terminated. Then, he allegedly said: "Not in a hundred years from now will Benfica ever be European champions." Benfica has appeared in five European Cup/UEFA Champions League finals and three UEFA Cup/UEFA Europa League finals since 1962 and did not win any. In the UEFA Youth League, Benfica's under-19 team lost three finals before winning the competition in 2021–22, thus reportedly breaking the curse that season. However, according to some news reports in 2023, the curse is yet to be broken.

The veracity of the curse is disputed, as in April 1963, in an interview to A Bola, Guttmann stated: "Benfica, at this moment, are well served and do not need me. They will win the Campeonato Nacional and will be champions of Europe again." According to David Bolchover, in his biography of Guttmann, the alleged curse was first mentioned in May 1988 by newspaper Gazeta dos Desportos, the day Benfica played their sixth European final. The curse had its origins in March 1968 when A Bola published a loose and unsigned translation from German to Portuguese of an interview given by Guttmann to Sport-Illustrierte five months earlier, in October 1967. Moreover, in November 2011, Eusébio, who was coached by Guttmann, also denied the existence of the curse, calling it a "lie".

=== Birmingham City ===
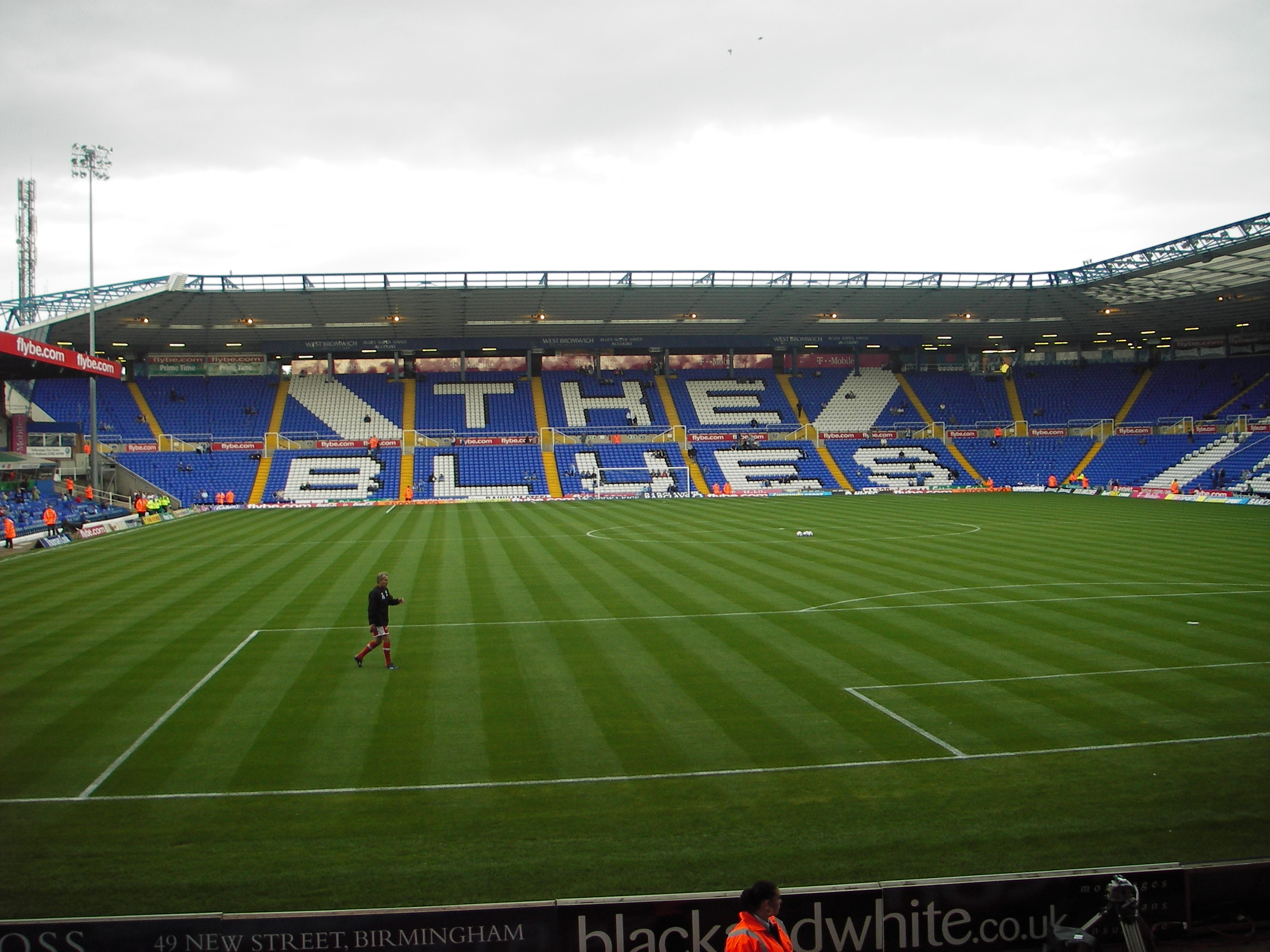
According to legend, Romani people put a 100-year curse on St Andrew's in 1906

English football side Birmingham City F.C. played 100 years under an alleged curse from 1906 to 2006. As the legend goes, the club moved from nearby Muntz Street into its current location at St Andrew's, building the stadium on land that was being used by the Romani people. After they were forced to move, the angry Romani people put a 100-year hex on the stadium.

Throughout the years many Birmingham City managers would try to remove the curse but with little success. Former manager Ron Saunders tried to banish the curse in the 1980s by placing crucifixes on floodlights and painting the bottom of his players' boots red. Another manager, Barry Fry, in charge from 1993 to 1996, urinated in all four corners of the pitch after a clairvoyant said it would break the spell. On Boxing Day 2006 the curse was finally lifted and on that day Birmingham City celebrated a 2–1 win over Queens Park Rangers F.C. Just over four years after the alleged curse ended, Birmingham City finally won the first major final in their history – beating Arsenal 2–1 to win the 2010–11 Football League Cup. Birmingham City were relegated to the Football League Championship later that season, and have not been promoted back to the Premier League since.

=== Brazil national team ===
==== World Cup European knockout curse ====
After winning the 2002 FIFA World Cup against Germany, Brazil has been eliminated in every subsequent edition by the first European team they face-off against in the knock-out stage of the tournament, having lost to France in 2006, Netherlands in 2010, Germany in 2014, Belgium in 2018, Croatia in 2022 and Norway in 2026. Additionally, four of these six losses (except in 2014, where they lost 7–1 at home to Germany in the semi-finals, and in 2026 when they lost to Norway in the round of 16) were in the quarterfinals.

==== Hexa cat curse ====
At the 2022 FIFA World Cup in Qatar, a cat interrupted the Brazil team's press conference. The cat was aggressively removed from the table by a member of the Brazilian staff, shocking the locals due to the reverence towards cats in Islam. The Brazilian Football Confederation quickly adopted the cat as an appeasement to avoid any bad luck, and named it Hexa after the sixth World Cup that they were chasing. Despite the measure, various media outlets purported that a curse from the cat was responsible for Brazil's loss to Croatia on penalties in the World Cup quarter-finals the following day, as well as an identical outcome at the 2024 Copa América, poor form in the 2026 FIFA World Cup qualifiers, and an elimination in the 2026 FIFA World Cup round of 16 by the hands of Norway.

=== Cruz Azul (Comizzo–Hermosillo's blood curse) ===
Origins of the curse began during the final of the Mexican League winter tournament in 1997, contested between Cruz Azul and Club León in a two-legged match. At the time they were the 3rd and fourth teams with the most league championships in Mexico respectively. Both teams were tied until the last moments of the second leg when Leon's goalkeeper Ángel Comizzo kicked Cruz Azul's star striker Carlos Hermosillo in the face, causing Hermosillo to bleed profusely inside the penalty area, leading to a foul and a penalty kick in Cruz Azul's favor. As the penalty was given, the referee asked Hermosillo to wipe the blood from his face, but Hermosillo ignored him and took the penalty kick, scoring a late winner. Cruz Azul became league champion for the eighth time in club history, but fans believed that both teams were cursed by the blood. Leon was then relegated to an inferior league in 2002 but since 2012 they were promoted back to the now-renamed Liga MX (formerly Primera División) and would later become back-to-back league champions after defeating Club América in the 2013 Apertura playoffs, breaking their part of the curse.

On the other hand, Cruz Azul had lost several finals in the Mexican league, the CONCACAF Champions League, and the Copa Libertadores, many of them at the last minute, which had their part in the curse hold true. While Cruz Azul won the 2013 Clausura edition of the Copa MX and the CONCACAF Champions League in 2014, the club had yet to win their first league championship since 1997. Their multiple losses and inability to win any league championship has rival club fans bestow Cruz Azul with the mock title "Sub-Campeonísimos" (literally "Supreme Runner ups".) Additionally, the term "'Cruzazulear'" (Cruzazul-ing) was coined to describe whenever the team (or any team in general) loses in a humiliating fashion at the last minutes. The word is now in observation by the Royal Spanish Academy

The "curse" was eventually broken at the end of the 2021 Clausura finals, when Cruz Azul defeated Santos Laguna 2–1 on aggregate, thus achieving their first league title in over 23 years, and ninth overall.

=== Derby County F.C. ===
English football side Derby County were placed under a curse by a group of Romani Gypsies who were forced to move from a camp so that they could build their stadium, the Baseball Ground. The curse was that Derby County would never win the FA Cup. This mirrors the curse placed on Birmingham City F.C.

Despite reaching six FA Cup semi-finals between 1896 and 1903, including three finals, they never managed to win the trophy. The next time they reached the final was in 1946 against Charlton Athletic. In the buildup to the final, a representative from the club went to meet with Gypsies in an attempt to lift the curse. During the match, with the score tied at 1–1, the ball burst. It has since been seen by fans of the club as the moment the curse was lifted. Derby County went on to win the match 4–1.

=== England national team and penalties ===
Prior to the 2018 FIFA World Cup England had not won a game on a penalty shootout since 1996. The curse was broken with a penalty victory against Colombia in the 2018 World Cup round of 16, and again against Switzerland national football team in the Euro 2024.

=== European national teams ===
==== European World Cup champions' curse ====
Starting in 2002, European winners of the FIFA World Cup have frequently been eliminated in the group stages of the next World Cup. As of 2018, Germany became the third World Champion in a row to bow out at the group stages of the World Cup, and the fourth in five competitions.

- 1998 winners France were eliminated at the group stages in 2002.
- 2006 winners Italy were eliminated at the group stages in 2010.
- 2010 winners Spain were eliminated at the group stages in 2014.
- 2014 winners Germany were eliminated at the group stages in 2018.

The curse was broken in 2022 when the 2018 winners France (who started the curse themselves) qualified for the Round of 16 after finishing first in their group. France then finished the tournament as runners up after failing to beat Argentina on penalties.

==== Europe's Brazil curse ====
Since the 2006 FIFA World Cup, European teams that beat Brazil at the knockout stage (see Brazil national team) have repeatedly suffered poor performances in subsequent UEFA European Championship and FIFA World Cup, with multiple cases such as:

- France, after eliminating Brazil at the 2006 FIFA World Cup, suffered a woeful series of underperformances, being eliminated early at the UEFA Euro 2008 and 2010 FIFA World Cup after abysmal showings and dressing room's infighting.
- Netherlands, having eliminated Brazil in the 2010 World Cup, went on to have abysmal performances at the UEFA Euro 2012, before suffering the jinx of missing out both the UEFA Euro 2016 and 2018 FIFA World Cup, and haven't recovered since.
- Germany, having thrashed Brazil 7–1 in 2014, went on to suffer a poor streak of performances, being eliminated early in subsequent tournaments (see Germany national team).
- Belgium, after eliminating Brazil in the 2018 World Cup, underperformed in the UEFA Euro 2020, before getting early exit at the 2022 World Cup and the UEFA Euro 2024.
- Croatia, after eliminating Brazil in the 2022 World Cup, had a woeful UEFA Euro 2024 performance after being eliminated without a win, before having a lethargic 2026 FIFA World Cup that saw Croatia crashed out early after losing to Portugal in the newly Round of 32.

=== FA Community Shield curse ===
It is popularly believed that when a Premier League team wins the annual season-opening FA Community Shield, they will be doomed to have a trophyless or otherwise largely unsuccessful season, and will not win the Premier League title. Since the beginning of the Premier League era in 1992, only eight teams have gone on to win the league after winning the Community Shield in the same season. The most recent team to do so was Manchester City in 2018.

=== FIFA cover curse ===
Some players who have appeared on the cover of EA's popular FIFA video game series have experienced a tragedy the next year. Of course, as with the Madden and Sports Illustrated cover jinx. Ronaldo has been the only exception. Allegedly cursed players include:

- David Beckham (FIFA: Road to World Cup 98): Was sent off in the last sixteen of the World Cup after kicking Diego Simeone of Argentina. This led to him become a hate figure in British tabloid media for several years.
- Wayne Rooney (FIFA 06): fractured a metatarsal and underperformed at the 2006 FIFA World Cup, which culminated with a red card in a quarter-final loss against Portugal.
- Theo Walcott (FIFA 10): was not selected for the England squad at the 2010 FIFA World Cup.
- Kaká (FIFA 11): was injured and only played eleven games in the 2010–11 La Liga.
- Jack Wilshere (FIFA 12): injured all season and did not play a single minute.
- Marco Reus (FIFA 17): was injured and only played 17 games in the 2016-17 Bundesliga.
- Eden Hazard (FIFA 20): was injured for most of the season after a €100 million move to Real Madrid, calling it "the worst season of his career."
- Kylian Mbappé (FIFA 21): He scored no goals in four matches at the 2020 UEFA European Championship. He then missed a penalty in a shootout against Switzerland, eliminating France in the Round of 16.
- Jamal Musiala (EA Sports FC 26): injured and only played 15 games in the 2025–26 Bundesliga, and did not make an impression at the 2026 World Cup. (However, Jude Bellingham was also on the cover, and he had a very successful season and World Cup.)

=== FIFA Confederations Cup winners' curse ===
During its entire existence, no FIFA Confederations Cup champion ever won the following FIFA World Cup, including many favorites. It began when Argentina was eliminated in an upset against Romania in 1994 after winning the first edition of the championship in 1992, still under the name "King Fahd Cup". Denmark, France and Germany would also fall victim of the alleged curse, first noticed and popularized in Brazil after three subsequent Brazilian titles, in 2005, 2009 and in 2013, linked to failures in 2006, 2010 and 2014. The competition would be abolished in 2019, ending the curse without no one ever breaking it.

=== FIFA U-20 World Cup winners' curse ===
Since Argentina, who won the 2007 FIFA U-20 World Cup and didn't qualify for the next edition, every reigning U-20 champion fails to qualify for the subsequent tournament.

- 2009 winners Ghana didn't qualify in 2011.
- 2011 winners Brazil didn't qualify in 2013.
- 2013 winners France didn't qualify in 2015.
- 2015 winners Serbia didn't qualify in 2017.
- 2017 winners England didn't qualify in 2019.
- 2019 winners Ukraine didn't qualify in 2023.
- 2023 winners Uruguay didn't qualify in 2025.

=== FIFA Women's World Cup hosts' quarter-finals curse ===
Since the first edition of the FIFA Women's World Cup in 1991, it is believed that a curse exists for every host country when they reached the quarter-finals of the FIFA Women's World Cup, with five out of eight hosts failed in the last eight, except for the United States (which hosted the 1999 and 2003 editions and also the most successful one). This pattern began with China losing to Sweden in 1991, before losing again in the same stage to Norway in 2007. Sweden, as hosts of the 1995 tournament, lost to China after penalties. Germany, meanwhile, suffered the most shocking quarter-finals elimination by far, losing to Japan after extra times despite being the defending champions and hosts of the 2011 edition. Canada, hosts of the 2015 edition, fell to England in the same stage. France, hosts of the 2019 edition, were eliminated by the United States in the last eight. Recently, one of the two host nations of the 2023 edition, New Zealand, didn't even make it out of the group stage.

The quarter-finals curse was finally broken by Australia, the other co-host nation at the 2023 tournament, on the penalty shootout (7–6) at the quarter-finals against France, the host nation at the previous tournament after an intense encounter. The Matildas went on to finish in 4th place, their best-ever run at the Women's World Cup.

=== Germany national team ===
Since the thrashing of Brazil 7–1 and their World Cup win against Argentina back in the 2014 FIFA World Cup, Germany's subsequent tournament campaigns have been poor by standard. Apart from their victory at the 2017 FIFA Confederations Cup, Germany have suffered two shock group stage exits in the 2018 and 2022 FIFA World Cups, and another poor showing at the 2026 FIFA World Cup. Plus, their UEFA European Championship records have also been lethargic, being eliminated early at the UEFA Euro 2020, and failed to win the UEFA Euro 2016 and 2024; it's believed that Germany's big win over Brazil had resulted in Germany being cursed from ever achieving great triumph again, hence the "7–1 curse".

=== Harry Kane's trophy curse ===
Despite being regarded as one of the best strikers in the world, Harry Kane had never won a senior trophy until 2025, neither for club or country. During his 12 years at Tottenham Hotspur, he helped the club reach the finals of the 2015 and 2021 editions of the League Cup, as well as their first UEFA Champions League final in 2019. However, Tottenham finished runner-up in all three finals. Despite becoming Spurs's all-time top goalscorer, Kane was never able to win a senior trophy with the club. With England, he helped the team to reach the semi-finals of the 2018 FIFA World Cup, where they were knocked out by Croatia, and the finals of UEFA Euro 2020 and UEFA Euro 2024, where they lost to Italy and Spain, respectively. He also missed a penalty against France in the 84th minute of the quarter finals of the 2022 FIFA World Cup, which led to England's elimination in the tournament.

Suggestions that Kane was cursed intensified in the 2023–24 season, when he joined Bayern Munich during the summer. At the time of his signing, Bayern had won 11 consecutive Bundesliga titles since 2013, and had not had a trophyless season since the 2011–12 season. On Kane's debut, the team lost the DFL-Supercup final 3–0 to RB Leipzig. The club then lost in the second round of the DFB-Pokal against third division side 1.FC Saarbrücken. On 14 April 2024, Bayern's run of 11 consecutive titles came to an end as Bayer Leverkusen were crowned champions of Germany for the first time in their history. Finally, Bayern were knocked out of the Champions League semi-finals by Real Madrid on 8 May, going trophyless for the first time in 12 years.

The curse was finally broken in the 2024–25 season, when Bayern regained the Bundesliga title. The club retained the title the following year, and Kane has also won the DFP-Pokal and the Franz Beckenbauer Supercup with the club.

=== Hibernian F.C. ===
Scottish football side Hibernian won their third Scottish Cup in 2016, defeating the Rangers in the final to end a 114-year drought stretching back to 1902. During that period, the Hibs lost ten Scottish Cup finals while achieving success in other domestic competitions, including four league titles and three League Cups. Despite regularly competing at the highest level in Scottish football and producing notable teams such as the Famous Five and Turnbull's Tornadoes, the Hibs weren't able to lift the Scottish Cup again until 2016.

Some Hibs fans attributed the absence of Scottish Cup success to a curse where a gypsy woman allegedly placed upon the club during the chairmanship of Harry Swan. Whilst renovation works were being carried out at Hibernian's Easter Road stadium in the 1950s, a harp crest – which had been displayed on the South Stand symbolizing Hibernian's founding Irish roots – was removed and subsequently did not reappear when work had finished. During the 2015–16 season, Hibs' modern day badge (which includes the harp) was placed upon the facade of the West Stand at Easter Road. Less than eight months after the harp had been reinstated onto the walls of Easter Road, Hibernian F.C. became Scottish Cup winners after more than a century in the making.

=== Italy's FIFA World Cup curse ===
Since Italy's successful 2006 FIFA World Cup run, they have been unable to reach the knockout stage, exiting the group stage in 2010 and 2014 and have since failed to qualify for the tournament altogether in 2018, 2022, and 2026. It is alleged that this curse was placed by Zinedine Zidane who got sent off in the Final for headbutting Marco Materazzi.

=== Kylian Mbappé's Champions League curse ===
Kylian Mbappé, France's all time leading national team goalscorer, has never won UEFA Champions League when he played for Monaco, Paris Saint-Germain, and Real Madrid. Real Madrid had won the title the season before he came to the club, with Paris winning it the season after. Mbappé was also frequently blamed for causing misfortunes to teams that he played with.

=== Leeds United FC ===
Don Revie, manager of Leeds United from 1961 to 1974 and known for a having an array of superstitions and phobias, attributed a poor run of results in 1971 to a gypsy curse. The curse was apparently placed when a group of gypsies were evicted from the land upon which the Elland Road stadium was built in 1890. Revie thus invited a fortune teller named Gypsy Rose Lee to Elland Road. She went to all four corners of the pitch, scratched the grass and threw some seeds down, and over a cup of tea afterwards informed Revie that the curse had been lifted.

=== Liverpool F.C. ===
Liverpool goalkeeper Bruce Grobbelaar claimed in interviews that the reason why Liverpool had not won the league since the 1989–90 season was because a witch-doctor put a curse on the club from ever winning the league in a testimonial match for Grobbelaar in 1992 and that the only way to break the curse was to urinate on the four goalposts at the Anfield. In a December 2019 interview, Grobbelaar revealed to have splashed urine on all four goalposts at Anfield after a charity match in May; he had been caught urinating on the posts at the Kop end in 2014. His confession came as Liverpool won the 2019–20 Premier League with 99 points.

=== Mexico national team (Round of 16 curse) ===
Since 1994, The Mexico national football team were eliminated from every FIFA World Cup at the round of 16 stage except in 2022 (being eliminated in the group stage), losing to Bulgaria in 1994, Germany in 1998, the United States in 2002, Argentina in 2006 and 2010, Netherlands in 2014, Brazil in 2018 and to England in 2026.

It is believed that the curse came from the cachirules scandal, in which four Mexican players were discovered falsifying their age, resulting in Mexico being disqualified from the 1988 Summer Olympics in South Korea, the 1989 FIFA World Youth Championship in Saudi Arabia, and the 1990 FIFA World Cup in Italy.

=== Mick Jagger curse ===
When singer Mick Jagger openly supports a team or attends a game supporting a team, the supported team has suffered losses. The curse was widely speculated and reported on during the 2010, 2014 and 2018 World Cups.

=== Oxford United Kassam Stadium curse ===
A series of catastrophic financial issues in the 1990s led to Oxford United's new stadium to be left half-built for three years. Then, in 2001 once the ground was finally complete and the club moved in, the team faced a series of poor results. Firoz Kassam, the owner and Chairman of Oxford United at the time, and the club's chaplain, blamed all of these issues on a curse they claimed had been placed on the ground by some gypsies who had been evicted from the land just before construction took place. Their concern was enough for them to call in the Bishop of Oxford at the time to carry out an exorcism to rid the ground of the curse, although the Bishop himself later claimed it was merely a simple blessing rather than an exorcism. In the first match at the stadium after the Bishop's intervention, the team registered a 2-2 draw with York City.

=== Raith Rovers Inverness curse ===
Raith Rovers did not defeat Inverness Caledonian Thistle in a Scottish league fixture between the years 2000 and 2023, until the curse was finally broken on 16 September 2023 thanks to a goal from Jamie Gullan and a theatrical goalkeeping performance from Kevin Dabrowski. Raith's record at the Caledonian Stadium was a particular focus of the curse. After recording a win in Inverness on 28 October 2000, Raith would have to wait until 2 December 2023 until they would win in Inverness again, when it was again Jamie Gullan that broke the Caledonian Stadium Curse with a stoppage-time penalty. The result was also significant in that it dealt Duncan Ferguson his first defeat as Inverness Caledonian Thistle Manager, nearly thirty years after he assaulted a Raith Rovers player during his time at Rangers. During the period of the curse, the two sides played each other thirty times in the league. In recent years, the final ten minutes of the fixture have become synonymous with ever-more improbable comebacks from both sides

=== Red, white, and black play-off curse ===
Teams who traditionally wear red and white striped shirts and black shorts are said to be cursed in the English Football League play-offs. Between the inception of the play-offs in 1987 and 2020, clubs who use those colours made 33 play-off appearances and all failed to win promotion. In that time, Brentford and Sheffield United both lost in four play-off finals, and Exeter City, Sunderland, and Lincoln City lost three finals apiece. One exception occurred in 1990, when Sunderland lost to Swindon Town, but they were subsequently awarded the promotion place due to financial irregularities involving Swindon. The curse was beaten in 2021, when Brentford beat Swansea City to win promotion to the Premier League. A day later, Lincoln City lost the League One play-off final to Blackpool. In 2022, Sunderland ended their own curse with victory in the League One play-off final. As of 2022, teams who wear red and white striped shirts have a play-off success rate of 8.8%.

=== River Plate ===
Any European team that previously faced River Plate in an Intercontinental Cup or FIFA Club World Cup Final never again won the UEFA Champions League/European Cup. River Plate beat Steaua București 1–0 in the 1986 Intercontinental Cup, but lost 0–1 to Juventus in the 1996 Intercontinental Cup and 0–3 to FC Barcelona in the 2015 FIFA Club World Cup Final. FC Barcelona never again played a Champions League Final, Steaua București went on to lose the 1989 Champions League Final and Juventus has gone on to lose five finals in a row after the 1996 Intercontinental Cup (in 1997, 1998, 2003, 2015, and 2017).

River Plate played in the 2018 FIFA Club World Cup after beating rivals Boca Juniors 5–3 on aggregate in the 2018 Copa Libertadores Finals, but lost on penalties in their semi-final against Emirati side Al-Ain, preventing River Plate from playing the 2018 Final against Real Madrid CF.

River Plate was once again eliminated from an international competition in June 2025 at the FIFA Club World Cup, placed in Group E, obtaining a 3–1 win over Japan's Urawa Red Diamonds, a scoreless draw against Mexico's Monterrey and a devastating 2–0 loss to Inter Milan accumulating only four points. River Plate's elimination in Group stage comes exactly 24 hours after archrivals Boca Juniors (placed in Group C) themselves were also eliminated with a 1–1 draw at the hands of New Zealand's Auckland City FC.

=== Scotland national team ===
The Scotland national football team has participated in nine FIFA World Cups, as well as four UEFA European Championship, but has always been eliminated from the first round each time. The same issue happens to the Scotland women's national football team, when it was eliminated from the group stage of UEFA Women's Euro 2017 and 2019 FIFA Women's World Cup despite having chances to progress.

=== South Korea national team (fake gold medal curse) ===
The South Korea national football team won the first two editions of the AFC Asian Cup title, in 1956 and 1960. On the latter occasion they were also the host nation. After winning in 1960, the entire team went to receive their gold medals, only to find the medals were fake, as the money for real gold was stolen by a corrupt official. The players then demanded that the Korea Football Association acquire real gold medals, but no one took responsibility for the issue for 50 years. Some Korean fans believed the national team was cursed by this action of the KFA – the national team has not won an Asian Cup title since. In that time South Korea lost four finals, against Iran, Kuwait, Saudi Arabia and Australia. The KFA tried to undo the curse by giving medals to the surviving players of 1960 and their relatives (still not completed), but as of the 2023 AFC Asian Cup, they have yet to win it again.

=== UEFA Champions League's curse ===
Since rebranding in 1992, no teams in the UEFA Champions League, except for Real Madrid, had managed to defend the trophy they won in the previous season.

The curse was ultimately broken by Paris Saint-Germain, following their consecutive victories at the 2025 and 2026 UEFA Champions League finals.

=== UEFA Cup Winners' Cup holders' curse ===
In the 39-year history of the UEFA Cup Winners' Cup, no team won successive titles. Eight teams reached the following final as winners of the previous edition, including the first two defending title holders, but none successfully retained the trophy.

=== United States' Mexican soil curse ===
Since the two CONCACAF rivals United States and Mexico faced each other for the first time in 1934, the United States have never been able to beat Mexico in Mexican soil in any competitive fixture, with the only win dated back in a friendly in 2012. Prior to 2012, the best result for the U.S. had been a 0–0 draw and in front of a crowd of over 110,000 in attendance during the 1998 World Cup qualifying campaign at Azteca stadium on 2 November 1997 obtaining a worthy point in order to maintain hopes of qualifying to the following year's World Cup. Even when the United States have rapidly emerged as a formidable soccer country since the late 1980s, and even held an undefeated streak against Mexico from 2020 to 2024, the U.S. have remained unable to defeat Mexico competitively in Mexican territory, as all five American wins since 2020 happened entirely in the U.S.

Various attempts have been tried to undo the Mexican soil curse, from playing in familiar ground to even arriving early to familiarise, but with little success; it's believed that high altitude, combined with massive breathing difficulty and raucous, hostile crowd, greatly affected the United States players when they line up against Mexico.

On 15 October 2024, the U.S. played Mexico in Zapopan, Jalisco and saw their three-year winning-streak (6 June 2021 – 24 March 2024) over Mexico come to an abrupt end losing the match 2–0, a particular score which has historically favored the Americans since the start of the 21st century. Goals from Raúl Jiménez (22nd minute) and César Huerta (49th minute) ended the American dominance of recent years (5 wins, 2 draws). In turn, Mexico had not obtained a win against the U.S. on Mexican home soil since 12 August 2009 when Mexico defeated the U.S. 2–1 towards the 2010 World Cup and in general since their last win over the U.S. 3–0 on 6 September 2019. Plus, a full Mexican 2–0 win had not been obtained since 19 January 1997.

== Australian rules football ==
=== Cheltenham cemetery curse ===
For a long time, the SANFL club the Port Adelaide Magpies had a period of prolonged dominance at Alberton Oval. It was widely commented that opposition teams became cursed as they passed by Cheltenham cemetery on the way to the ground. Malcolm Blight, as coach for Woodville, played up the curse for his players in the lead up to a match, parking the bus in front of the cemetery, and making his players walk past it. Woodville lost the ensuing match, but Blight maintained that the team would have lost by more if he had not forced the team to walk past the cemetery.

=== Colliwobbles ===
The Colliwobbles refers to the failure of the Collingwood Football Club to win a single premiership from the years 1958 to 1990, despite appearing in nine Grand Finals during that time. Following their famous upset victory against Melbourne in 1958, Collingwood went on to lose the next 8 grand finals, including a hat trick of losses in 1979, 1980 and 1981. Two particular examples of the supposed curse include 1970, where Collingwood were leading arch-rivals Carlton by 44 points at half time, but went on to lose the match by 10 points (the largest half-time turnaround in Grand Final history), and in 1977, wherein Collingwood drew with North Melbourne in the Grand Final, before losing the replay the next week by a hefty margin, The term Collywobbles was first coined by Lou Richards. The curse was ended in 1990 after Collingwood ended their 32 year long drought by defeating Essendon. However Collingwood has continued to be cursed when playing grand finals in September having lost 4 grand finals since 1990 such as 2002, 2003, 2011 and most notably 2018 where after kicking the first 5 goals of the match they lost by 5 points thanks to a kick from Dom Sheed in the dying minutes of the game to seal a famous victory. Collingwood's only other premiership came in 2010 following a draw the week before. Collingwood only two premierships from 1958 to 2023 have both occurred in October, and both premierships occurring after drawn finals which required replays (1990 Qualifying Final vs West Coast & 2010 Grand Final vs St. Kilda). Collingwood broke the curse by winning a historic amount of close games across the 2022 and 2023 seasons, capped of by winning the 2023 AFL Grand Final by 5 points.

=== Curse of Norm Smith ===
The Curse of Norm Smith is the name given to the curse that was supposedly behind the Melbourne Football Club's premiership drought from 1964 until 2021. Partway through the 1965 VFL season, the Melbourne Football Club sacked coach Norm Smith. The sacking came as a massive surprise, as Smith was and still is considered one of the greatest coaches in VFL/AFL history, and under his tenure Melbourne were the most dominant club in the competition, participating in 8 Grand Finals, including a record seven consecutive grand finals from 1954 to 1960, for six premierships. The reasons for the sacking were vague, but mostly centered around concerns that his personality was becoming bigger than the club itself, as well as an incident in 1963 where he was sued by umpire Don Blew for defamation. Smith was soon reinstated after fan backlash and a collapse in the team's performance, however the damage was done and his relationship with the Melbourne board was ruined, he left for good in 1967. The ignominious way in which the sacking was performed has become fodder for a "curse" within club folklore as the reason behind the club's inability to win another premiership for 57 years. Melbourne would fail to make the finals for the next twenty-two seasons (1965 to 1986). They also won seven wooden spoons and only appeared in two grand finals (1988 & 2000, in both instances being beaten by large margins) from 1965 to 2020.

Numerous other unfortunate events in the history of the Melbourne Football Club have also been attributed to the curse, such as Jim Stynes' after the siren free kick giveaway in Melbourne's 1987 Preliminary Final match against the Hawthorn Hawks, which allowed Hawthorn player Gary Buckenara to kick the winning goal, as well as serious knee injuries to players including David Schwarz and Christian Petracca. In 2021, after 57 years (ironically the same age of Smith when he died in 1973), the curse was broken when Melbourne won the 2021 AFL Grand Final over the Western Bulldogs by the biggest margin in the club's history, in a game played in Perth.

=== Kennett curse ===
This is the name given to AFL club Hawthorn's 11 match losing streak against rivals Geelong, from the 2008 AFL Grand Final to the 2013 preliminary final. After the Hawks won the 2008 premiership, then-Hawthorn President Jeff Kennett proclaimed that Geelong "lacked the mentality to defeat Hawthorn in big games". From that time, however, Geelong defeated Hawthorn eleven times in a row, most games being decided by 10 points or less. The winning streak was also attributed to comments made by Paul Chapman that the Cats will "never lose to them again" following the 2008 Grand Final. Chapman missed Hawthorn's curse-breaking win in 2013 due to suspension.

== Baseball ==
=== Boston Red Sox ===
Some allege that there was a curse placed on the Boston Red Sox, who failed to win a World Series after 1918, apparently due to the selling of Babe Ruth to the New York Yankees. Before the sale, the Red Sox had won four titles in seven years (1912–1918). After the sale, the Yankees went on to win 26 World Series Championships, before the Red Sox would win again. The "curse" was broken when, after 86 seasons, the Red Sox defeated the St. Louis Cardinals 4 games to 0 in the 2004 World Series (before the Series, the Red Sox had come back from a 3-games-to-0 deficit, a first in Major League postseason history, to defeat the Yankees at the original Yankee Stadium for the American League pennant).

=== Chicago Cubs and White Sox ===
Both of Chicago's baseball teams were involved in supposed curses. The Chicago Cubs, after benefiting from a baserunning error by New York Giants' Fred Merkle during the last couple of weeks in the season, won the 1908 World Series. From 1909 to 2015, the Cubs did not win a World Series, despite participating as the National League (NL) champion seven times between 1910 and 1945. The 1945 World Series appearance was most notable because it marked the start of the Curse of the Billy Goat. That incident involved Billy Sianis, owner of the Billy Goat Tavern, who was asked to leave a World Series game vs. the Detroit Tigers because his pet goat's odor bothered other fans. From 1946 to 2015, the closest the Cubs had advanced to the World Series was five outs away in game 6 of the 2003 NLCS vs. the Florida Marlins, when Steve Bartman, a Cubs fan, attempted to catch a foul ball. The Cubs defeated the Los Angeles Dodgers in the 2016 National League Championship Series (NLCS), winning the organization's first National League (NL) pennant since 1945. The Cubs finally won the 2016 World Series against the Cleveland Indians, their first championship in 108 years. The Chicago White Sox were said to have been cursed because of their role in fixing the 1919 World Series. As a result, the Cincinnati Reds won that series in eight games, and eight White Sox players were banned by baseball for their actions in throwing the series. The White Sox wouldn't win another World Series until 2005, when they swept the Houston Astros in four games.

=== Cleveland Guardians ===
This curse supposedly prevents the Cleveland Guardians (formerly Indians) from competing in a pennant race, reaching postseason play, or winning the American League (AL) pennant and/or World Series. The origin of this curse dates back to 1960, when the then-Cleveland Indians traded outfielder Rocky Colavito to the Detroit Tigers for outfielder Harvey Kuenn. Cleveland played in and lost the World Series in 1995, 1997, and 2016, blowing a 3–1 series lead in the latter. The last time they emerged victorious in the World Series was in 1948.

=== Hanshin Tigers ===
This curse was supposedly cast on the Hanshin Tigers by Colonel Harland Sanders (the founder and mascot of Kentucky Fried Chicken) after fans of the team threw his statue into the Dōtonbori Canal while celebrating the Tigers' 1985 Japan Championship Series, not to be recovered until 2009.

The curse was broken in 2023 when the Tigers won Game 7 of the 2023 Japan Series for their first NPB championship since 1985.

=== Milwaukee Brewers ===
The Milwaukee Brewers reverse World Series curse (or Brewers World Series curse) is a supposed pattern that saw every team the Milwaukee Brewers lost to in the postseason throughout their entire history at least make it to the World Series. The curse technically ended with the New York Mets, who beat the Brewers in the 2024 Wild Card round, were themselves defeated by the Los Angeles Dodgers in the 2024 NLCS, thus not qualifying for the World Series. In some respect, it made this curse unique where it did not have to end with the cursed team winning a championship. Many think the curse was placed on the city due to nefarious circumstances surrounding the Pilots move from Seattle to Milwaukee, thus making it a scenario where the Brewers cannot win a World Series until the Seattle Mariners win a World Series first (to date, this has not occurred).

Nevertheless, a few seasons after the curse ended, the Brewers ended their title drought, defeating the Tampa Bay Rays in five games to win the World Series for the first time in their history.

=== San Francisco Giants ===
This curse is an alleged hex placed on the San Francisco Giants following their move from New York City and refers to Coogan's Bluff which is a cliff that overlooked the former site of the Polo Grounds, which was the Giants' home in New York. In 1921, the Giants honored Eddie Grant, the first Major League Baseball player killed in World War I, with a plaque in centerfield, but the plaque was lost during the field invasion by fans that followed the Giants' final game at Polo Grounds at the end of the 1957 season.

Since then, the Giants, who had won five World Series titles, all but the first with the Eddie Grant plaque in centerfield, lost in their next three World Series appearances, including the '89 Series that was delayed because of the Loma Prieta earthquake. Two of those series losses were in the seventh game.

The Giants were approached on multiple occasions with offers to replace the plaque, but the management refused, citing a preference to keep the team's New York history separate. But the team eventually relented, installing a replica of the original plaque in AT&T Park on Memorial Day, 2006. A club official at the time said, "Baseball fans are so superstitious, and players are too, so you have to take this stuff seriously. And if by putting up a plaque we can break some sort of curse, who's to say it's not the right thing to do?"

The Giants' 2010s dynasty represented their first World Series championships in San Francisco. It should be mentioned that all three victories (2010, 2012, 2014) were won on the road, away from San Francisco.

=== Texas Rangers ===
The "Curse of Bob Short" was a curse that allegedly prevented the Texas Rangers baseball franchise from winning the World Series since the team was relocated from Washington, D.C., until another D.C. team, the Nationals, won a championship in 2019.

The Texas Rangers franchise started as the Washington Senators in 1961. During its 11 years in Washington, the team did not make the postseason and had only one winning season. Bob Short took over as team owner and general manager in 1968. The financial issues of the team forced Short to trade away his good players, disappointing the fanbase and threatening the team's future in D.C. He would not renew the stadium's lease as he could not find the buyer after the ultimatum was reached. By a 10–2 vote, the Senators would be relocated to Texas, upsetting the fans in the Washington, D.C. area.

In the last Senators home game in 1971 against the New York Yankees, fans got into the ballpark without paying and put up a banner that said "SHORT STINKS!". In the ninth inning, with two outs and the Senators leading 7–5, the deranged fans ran onto the field, stealing souvenirs, including the first-base bag. As a result of this, the game was forfeited to the Yankees. The forfeit upset the fans even more, who reportedly put the curse on the relocating team, ensuring that they would never win a world championship away from Washington until the city got another franchise and win their championship first.

After what would become known as the Texas Rangers moved to Arlington, the franchise would not make its first postseason appearance in Texas until 1996. In their three appearances in the mid-to-late-'90s, all against the Yankees, they won only one playoff game. The Rangers would finally go deep into the postseason in 2010, winning the American League pennant but losing the World Series to the San Francisco Giants. in 2011, the Rangers would return to the World Series, where they almost won the series in Game 6 before the St. Louis Cardinals erased a two-run deficit in the bottom of the ninth inning and came back to win in the tenth. The Cardinals would go on to win Game 7 and with it, the series. After that, the Rangers would return to mediocrity, only making the playoffs a handful of times and never making it past the AL divisional round until 2023.

As previously mentioned, the curse was allegedly broken when the Montreal Expos moved to Washington, D.C. in 2005 and won their first World Series in 2019. Four years after the Nationals won the World Series, the Texas Rangers would win in 2023, thus officially ending the curse.

== Basketball ==
=== 40–20 rule ===
More of a superstitious rule than a curse, the 40–20 rule posits that an NBA team must win 40 games before losing 20 to have a chance at winning that year's championship. It was first publicized by 11-time NBA champion head coach Phil Jackson. Ever since the NBA added the three-point line in the 1979–80 season, all but five champions won 40 games before losing 20. The five teams that won the championship without winning 40 games before losing 20 are the 1994–95 Houston Rockets, 2003–04 Detroit Pistons, 2005–06 Miami Heat, the 2020–21 Milwaukee Bucks and the 2025-26 New York Knicks. Both the 1995 Rockets and 2004 Pistons teams experienced a roster transformation midway through the season and the Bucks played a 72-game schedule rather than the normal 82 due to the COVID-19 pandemic.

=== The BasedGod's Curse ===
In May 2011, Oklahoma City Thunder small forward Kevin Durant tweeted an insult directed at cult rapper Lil B, a.k.a. "The BasedGod," in which Durant expressed incredulity at the idea that Lil B had become "relevant". In response, Lil B tweeted out the BasedGod's Curse, claiming that Durant would never win the NBA championship. The two men have exchanged further insults and basketball-related challenges on Twitter. In June 2012, Lil B claimed on Twitter that he had lifted the curse; however, in February 2014, during the NBA All-Star Game in which Durant was playing, Lil B resumed insulting Durant on Twitter, implying that the curse had returned. Lil B later released a diss song directed at Durant entitled "F KD". in 2016, the Thunder blew a 3–1 lead in the Western Conference Finals to the Golden State Warriors. In the offseason, he left for the Warriors. On July 4, 2016, following that announcement, Lil B rescinded the curse again. In the 2017 NBA Finals, the Warriors beat the Cleveland Cavaliers in five games to win the NBA championship, giving Durant his first ever title.

=== New York Knicks ===
In June 2026, the New York Knicks defeated the San Antonio Spurs to win the NBA Finals for the first time in 53 years, losing only one game in the series. The game they lost, a home game at Madison Square Garden, was attended by Donald Trump, who had not attended a Knicks game in many years and whose presence was widely criticized. After the game, fans and sports media attributed the Knicks' loss to a curse brought about by Trump's attendance, with several fans burning sage outside the arena in a mock cleansing ritual.

== Gaelic Games ==
=== Mayo ===
The Curse of '51 allegedly prevented the Mayo senior footballers from winning the Sam Maguire Cup ever again, or at least until the death had occurred of every member of the last winning team from 1951. It remained unbroken until 26 July 2026, when it won the 2026 All-Ireland Senior Football Championship final. Until that victory, the team had reached the final on eleven occasions since 1951, but either completely collapsed on the day or were undone by a series of other unfortunate events.

The legend tells that while the boisterous Mayo team were passing through Foxford on the victorious journey home, the team failed to wait quietly for a funeral cortège to pass by on its way to the graveyard. The presiding priest consequently put a curse on Mayo football to never win a subsequent All-Ireland SFC final until all members of the 1951 team are dead.

In 1989, Mayo reached their first All-Ireland SFC final since the previous victory in 1951, only to lose to Cork. In 1996, a freak point by Meath at the end of the final forced a replay, which saw Mayo concede another late score that would deny them victory. Kerry bridged an 11-year title gap against Mayo with a three-point win in the 1997 final, before torturing them by eight points in 2004, then thirteen points in 2006.

However, players from the team dismissed the stories of a curse, saying that it was never mentioned until the 1990s, and that the team actually travelled by lorry, not bus, and could not even see out the windows. Moreover, the team returned home on a Sunday night; it is extremely rare for a Catholic funeral to take place on a Sunday, and a funeral cortège would not be passing at night-time either.

Mayo returned to the All-Ireland SFC final in 2012. Even with Taoiseach Enda Kenny in Rome seeking divine intervention through Pope Benedict XVI the day before, the "Kafkaesque black farce" continued from where it had left off—with Donegal allowed bridge a 20-year gap between titles, helped in no small part by a nightmare opening quarter for Mayo as Michael Murphy—the son of a Mayoman—launched a rocket of a shot into the goal after three minutes. Then, in the eleventh minute, Colm McFadden seized the ball from the grasp of Kevin Keane and slid it into the net for a second Donegal goal. Mayo only got on the scoresheet after sixteen minutes and never led at any point during the match. They eventually lost with thirteen points to Donegal's two goals and eleven.

Mayo lost again in 2013, this time by a single point to Dublin.

Mayo qualified for the 2016 final to face Dublin; the curse seemingly struck again when Mayo scored two own goals before half-time, drawing level with Dublin in the last few minutes of the game. Mayo then faced Dublin in a replay, lost, again by a single point.

Mayo appeared again in the 2017 final and in the 2020 final (held on 19 December 2020 due to the impact of the COVID-19 pandemic on Gaelic games). Mayo faced Dublin in both those finals, losing both, as the curse continued to strike. The curse continues to strike. In the 2021 final, Mayo lost to Tyrone, having missed a penalty and several goal chances. That game also saw Tyrone win a fourth Sam Maguire Cup, overtaking Mayo in the all-time record.

Following the death of Fr Peter Quinn in January 2016 and Pádraig Carney in 2019, two living members of the 1951 All-Ireland SFC winning team remained: Paddy Prendergast and Mick Loftus. Mick Loftus was a sub but didn't play. Prendergast died in September 2021; at the time of his death, Mayo had reached 11 All-Ireland SFC finals since 1951, and lost every one. this left Loftus as the last and only remaining of the 1951 winning team until his passing in April 2023.

The curse was finally broken at the 2026 All-Ireland Senior Football Championship final, where Mayo beat defending champions Kerry 1–20 to 1–17. The victory ended a 75-year losing streak. This was the first final they had played in since all the members of the 1951 team had passed away.

=== Biddy Early ===
Biddy Early was a 19th-century healer from Feakle in County Clare. Her curse or prophecy was said variously to afflict two hurling teams which endured long droughts in the All-Ireland Senior Hurling Championship: Clare (1914–1995) and/or Galway (1923–1980). The two counties played a famous semi-final in the 1932 championship: Clare won, but lost the final to Kilkenny. After Clare's "curse" was broken in 1995, Billy Loughnane from Ennis wrote to The Irish Times, denouncing the idea of a curse as preposterous, mainly because Early died in 1872 before the GAA was even founded.

== Ice hockey ==
=== Chicago Blackhawks ===
A curse allegedly placed on the Chicago Blackhawks in 1927 by head coach Pete Muldoon when he was fired, stating that they would never again finish in first place. The "curse" was first mentioned in print in 1943 by Toronto sportswriter Jim Coleman. They would not finish in first place in their division (1928–1937) or in the single-division NHL (after 1938) until 1967, the final season of the Original Six era, despite winning the Stanley Cup three times since Muldoon supposedly "cursed" the team. However, immediately after this, Coleman admitted that he had completely fabricated the "curse" to break a writer's block.

=== New York Rangers ===
The Curse of 1940 was a mythical explanation for the failure of the NHL's New York Rangers to win the Stanley Cup since 1940. The curse supposedly began after the Rangers won the Stanley Cup in 1940, which was the same year the team's owners had paid off their mortgage for their home arena, Madison Square Garden, and the owners celebrated by burning the mortgage contract in the bowl of the Cup. It was broken when the Rangers defeated the Vancouver Canucks 4 games to 3 in the 1994 Stanley Cup Final. At the sound of the Game 7 final buzzer, former New York Rangers MSG Network announcer Sam Rosen (sportscaster) called "The waiting is over! The New York Rangers are the Stanley Cup Champions! And this one will last a lifetime!" Over the next three decades since 1994, the team would miss the playoffs from the 1997–98 season until the 2005–06 season, experienced many frustrating playoff exits in the 2010s and 2020s, and also saw their hated local rival the New Jersey Devils win 3 Stanley Cups over this time. Because of their success in the late 90s and early 00s, Devils fans will often chant "94 and never more!" or "1 Cup Since Hitler Died!" to taunt Rangers fans. Rangers fans and faithful have questioned whether there may have been an unintentional new curse placed on the franchise after Rosen's memorable 1994 call. The organization has not won a Stanley Cup since 1994, and has only one appearance in the finals since; when in 2014 they lost to the Los Angeles Kings 4 games to 1.

=== Presidents' Trophy Curse ===
Since the 2013 Chicago Blackhawks, no Presidents' Trophy winners has ever made it to the Stanley Cup Final. Moreover, no team that had won the Presidents' Trophy from 2016 to 2023 advanced past the second round until the Rangers did in 2024 after beating the Carolina Hurricanes 5–3 in game six to advance to the Eastern Conference Final.

Most notably since then, two teams have been eliminated in the Opening Round of these playoffs by their lower seeded opponents. In 2019 Tampa Bay Lightning got swept 0–4 by the 8th seeded Columbus Blue Jackets. This was followed by the 2023 Boston Bruins blowing a 3–1 series lead to the last seeded Florida Panthers. In the latter case, the Boston Bruins set the NHL record for the most games (65) and points (135) ever won in a single season, leading the Panthers by 43 points, thus making this one of the greatest upsets in NHL playoff history.

=== Canada's Stanley Cup Curse ===
This curse resulted from the southward expansion of the NHL, which began when the Tampa Bay Lightning started play in the 1992–93 season. 1993 was also the last year a Canadian team, the Montreal Canadiens, has won the Stanley Cup while seven Sun Belt teams have won at least once since. This period saw five different Canadian teams make the Stanley Cup Final without winning the cup: the Vancouver Canucks in 1994 and 2011, the Calgary Flames in 2004, the Edmonton Oilers in 2006, 2024 and 2025, the Ottawa Senators in 2007, and the Canadiens in 2021.

Meanwhile, Sun Belt teams such as the Dallas Stars in 1999, the Tampa Bay Lightning in 2004, 2020 and 2021, the Carolina Hurricanes in 2006 and 2026, the Anaheim Ducks in 2007, the Los Angeles Kings in 2012 and 2014, the Vegas Golden Knights in 2023, and the Florida Panthers in 2024 and 2025 have won at least one Stanley Cup. A number of factors have been cited as explanations for Canadian clubs' Stanley Cup drought, including the institution of a salary cap, Canadian provinces having higher personal income tax rates compared to American states (some of which, primarily in the Sun Belt, levy no income tax), players' desire to live in warmer climates, and poor team management.

== Motor sports ==
=== Andretti family ===
Since winning the Indianapolis 500 in 1969, auto racing legend Mario Andretti was plagued with bad luck in his efforts to win the great race for a second time before his retirement in 1994. The misfortune at Indianapolis has notably extended to his sons Michael and Jeff, nephew John, as well as grandson Marco. It is also said to have affected, to an indirect extent, his twin brother Aldo, and former car owners Paul Newman and Carl Haas from Newman/Haas Racing.

Michael Andretti has won the race five times as an owner, but three times the respective driver subsequently defected to a rival team the following year.

=== Bike No. 1 curse ===
In MotoGP, as in most motorsports, the reigning champion is allowed to use the number 1 on their mount. However, for more than 25 years, the rider of the No. 1 motorcycle could not defend their title and was often the victim of unfortunate circumstances.

In 1999, Spanish rider Àlex Crivillé won the championship after Mick Doohan, who was using number 1 on his bike suffered a career ending incident during the title fight. Crivillé later failed to defend his title the next year after using the same number on his bike in 2000. The next year, the defending champion Kenny Roberts Jr. also failed to secure his title after using the same number. 6 years later, defending champion Nicky Hayden, who won the championship in 2006 also failed to defend his title using the number after numerous incidents he suffered in 2007. The next year Casey Stoner also suffered the same fate. 9 years after Stoner, defending champion Jorge Lorenzo also unable to defend his title after switching his bike number from 99 to 1. The curse was finally broken in 2023 when Francesco Bagnaia won the championship using the number 1 only to lose it to Jorge Martín one year later after crashing at Malaysian sprint round. In 2025, Jorge Martín suffered an injury after training crash before the season start and was forced to miss first two rounds as he was scheduled to use the number for 2025 season. Ultimately, Martin would not be able to contest the entirety of 2025, retiring in Qatar and finishing seventh at the Czech Republic.

=== Home Grand Prix curse ===
A number of drivers have apparently poor luck when racing in their home Grands Prix, with notable examples being Carlos Reutemann, Rubens Barrichello, Jenson Button, Mark Webber, Charles Leclerc and George Russell. Barrichello had qualified third or higher five times, including three pole positions during his 19 starts at the Brazilian Grand Prix, but out of these attempts, his best result was third in the 2004 running of the race, with the remainder of the attempts seeing either Barrichello dropping down the order or ending up retiring. An extreme example was Reutemann in 1974 Argentine Grand Prix when, after starting sixth, he took the lead of the race in the third lap and remained so until the penultimate lap, when the car's air intake broke, causing excessive fuel consumption and ultimately retiring, with Reutemann in tears as he exited the car (he would only manage two second places at home, in 1979 and 1981, this being his last home race). Leclerc, meanwhile, did not finish his home Grand Prix, the Monaco Grand Prix until his fifth year in Formula One in 2022, with him retiring from all previous starts in his home race including his entry in the FIA Formula 2 Championship in 2017, and also failing to start after achieving pole position in the 2021 running of the race. In 2022, Leclerc again achieved pole position, but lost the race because of a strategy error. However, Leclerc broke his curse by winning the 2024 Monaco Grand Prix. Russell has only scored points at the British Grand Prix twice out of all of his visits in his home race (including the one-off 70th Anniversary Grand Prix at the same track).

No Australian has ever been recorded finishing on the podium or outright winning in their home race, in both Adelaide and Melbourne since the race was added to the Formula One calendar in 1985, with Alan Jones being the last Australian to win a home Grand Prix, in 1980. Daniel Ricciardo came in second during the 2014 running of the event, but was subsequently disqualified due to a technical infringement. As of June 2026, Webber, Ricciardo and Oscar Piastri joint-hold the record for the highest finishing Australians in their home, with a 4th place each in the 2012, 2018 and 2024 editions.

=== One-off livery curse ===
A number of drivers and teams have also suffered misfortunes running one-off liveries on race weekends. At the 2008 Brazilian Grand Prix, David Coulthard's final F1 race ended in retirement in a first lap collision when his Red Bull was sporting a Wings for Life charity livery.

The Jaguar Racing team ran a special one-off livery at the 2004 Monaco Grand Prix promoting the release of Ocean's Twelve, with a $300,000 diamond mounted on each of the cars. The curse struck when driver Christian Klien crashed on the first lap, while Mark Webber retired later with a gearbox failure. Klien's crash resulted in the diamond going missing; it was never recovered. The following year, the Jaguar team, now rebranded Red Bull Racing, ran another livery that promoted the release of another film, this time Star Wars: Episode III – Revenge of the Sith. However, both drivers, Vitantonio Liuzzi and David Coulthard, finished their weekends early; Coulthard due to suspension damage from a wayward Michael Schumacher, and Liuzzi due to an accident later on in the race. Coulthard would eventually score Red Bull's first podium by finishing third at the subsequent year's running of the event, which saw the team utilise a Superman Returns livery; however, Christian Klien, returning to the now-rebranded Red Bull Racing, retired due to transmission problems. Similarly, Lucas di Grassi crashed his backmarker Abt Lola during free practice for race two of the 2025 Berlin ePrix while running a Superman livery.

Mercedes ran a special retro livery to celebrate 125 years of their involvement in motorsport at the 2019 German Grand Prix, but the curse took hold when Lewis Hamilton broke his front wing (the resulting pit stop took more than a minute to complete), spinning and ended up in ninth place having started from pole position while Valtteri Bottas crashed out.

Since 2022, the amount of special liveries run by teams on the grid have increased. Examples include Alfa Romeo's "Boogie" livery, which was run at the 2023 Dutch Grand Prix; during the race, Zhou Guanyu crashed out in intermediate conditions, and Bottas lost out to poor strategy from his team and ended up finishing fourteenth. At the 2023 Las Vegas Grand Prix, Lando Norris destroyed his Jack Daniels-liveried McLaren MCL60 after bottoming out and crashing heavily, while Piastri received a puncture after running across Lewis Hamilton and finished in tenth. In 2024, Mercado Libre-liveried Williams cars were involved in numerous, high-profile incident in the two races it was run, at Mexico City and São Paulo. In 2025, special-liveried Racing Bulls cars suffered early collision and wall-related retirements out of the 2025 British Grand Prix while running a special livery. Both Google Gemini-liveried McLarens suffered terminal damage in the 2025 United States Grand Prix sprint event, and was off the pace of eventual winner Max Verstappen in the main race.

=== Talladega Superspeedway ===
According to legend, the land that NASCAR racetrack Talladega Superspeedway sits on was cursed by a Native American shaman during the Trail of Tears; other stories claim that it was built on an Indian burial ground. The curse allegedly explains the high number of unusual occurrences, untimely deaths, and spectacular accidents that have plagued the track since its opening in 1969. Bizarre incidents at Talladega include a race in 1974, where roughly a dozen cars were sabotaged before the race started, and an incident in 1986 where the pace car was stolen by a drunk fan, who drove it around the track before being arrested. In 1973, former series champion Bobby Isaac parked his car mid race despite nothing being wrong with the car. When asked why, Isaac claimed a voice in his head ordered him to park the car.

=== Toyota at Le Mans ===
Japanese automaker Toyota began competing at the 24 Hours of Le Mans in 1985 and suffered poor luck in their attempts to win the race. In 1994, the SARD Toyota 94C-V suffered a broken gear linkage while leading, went to the garage for repairs, and ultimately finished second. The Toyota GT-One (TS020) had chances to win in both 1998 and 1999. In 1998, the leading #29 Toyota suffered a gearbox failure and retired with less than 90 minutes to go. Then in 1999, the #3 Toyota suffered a left rear tire failure while leading in the final hour and finished second.

Toyota soon left to compete in Formula One and would not return to compete for overall honors at Le Mans until 2012. In 2014, the #7 Toyota TS040 Hybrid retired from the lead with less than 11 hours left due to an electrical failure. The most famous example of Toyota's repeated Le Mans misfortunes came in 2016, when the leading #5 Toyota TS050 Hybrid suffered a loss of power with five minutes left, and retired before completing the final lap. Two of Toyota's three cars retired within 30 minutes of one another in 2017, while the remaining #8 car finished several laps down due to a mechanical issue. After five runner-up finishes without an overall victory (1992, 1994, 1999, 2013, and 2016) Toyota's Le Mans curse was lifted when the manufacturer won the 2018 24 Hours of Le Mans, the first of five consecutive Le Mans wins, and six in total as of 2026.

== Rugby ==
=== St George Illawarra Dragons ===
In the National Rugby League (NRL), the Canberra curse referred to the St. George Illawarra Dragons' constant inability to defeat the Canberra Raiders at their home ground, or anywhere else, between 2000 and 2014. The Raiders enjoyed an unusual dominance of the Dragons, winning matches between the pair on a regular basis regardless of which team enjoyed favouritism or home ground advantage. This curse came to an end in Round 23, 2014, with the Dragons winning 34–16; it was their first win over the Raiders in Canberra since 2000, overall since 2007, but just their second since 2001.

=== Welsh Grand Slams and Papal deaths ===
A Welsh legend involving the Wales Rugby team and the 6 Nations Championship states that a Pope dies every time Wales wins the tournament with a Grand Slam, and is often cited with the caveat "except in 1978, when Wales were really good (winning the Grand Slam for a record eighth time and the first ever "Triple Triple Crown"); and two popes died (Paul VI and John Paul I)".

The curse became the subject of analysis in 2008, with the results published in the British Medical Journal under the title "Rugby (the religion of Wales) and its influence on the Catholic church: should Pope Benedict XVI be worried?" The study found a "weak" statistical link, between the Grand Slams and Papal deaths, and as such concluded that "given the dominant Welsh performances of 2008, the Vatican medical team should take special care of the pontiff this Christmas."

The correlation is strengthened when both Catholic and Coptic Popes are included. Medical researcher Edward Snelson, noted that Coptic Pope Shenouda III died on the very same day that the Welsh team won their 2012 Grand Slam. While his predecessor, Cyril VI had died in the same month that Wales won their 1971 Grand Slam.

== Other sports ==
=== Canadian curling ===
In the 1972 Air Canada Silver Broom curling tournament, Robert LaBonte, the skip of the American team, accidentally kicked the stone belonging to the Canadian team at the end of the match. This put the match into an extra end, and Canada won one more point to win the championship. Canada did not win another World Championship until 1980, and this was said that LaBonte put a "curse" on Canada.

=== Masters Tournament ===
The Masters Tournament held annually at the Augusta National Golf Club in Augusta, Georgia begins with an informal par-3 competition. No winner of this has ever gone on to win the main tournament the same year. Eleven golfers have won both the contest and the Masters, with two of them winning the Masters later in the career after winning the contest. Raymond Floyd came the closest to winning both in 1990, but he lost in a sudden-death playoff.

=== World Snooker Championship ===
In snooker, the "Crucible Curse" refers to the fact that no first-time winner of the World Snooker Championship has successfully defended his title since the event was first held at the Crucible Theatre in Sheffield in 1977. Of the 19 first-time champions in this era, only two have even made the final the following year, and seven were eliminated in their first match. The "curse" can even be seen in the pre-Crucible era—the three first-time champions between the start of the championship's "modern era" in 1969 and its move to the Crucible all lost in their respective semifinal matches the next year. All three players went on to win a championship at the Crucible, and all failed to retain their title after their first victory at that venue.

=== Curse of the rainbow jersey ===
In cycle racing, the "curse of the rainbow jersey" is a popular term referring to the phenomenon where cyclists who have become World Champion (who wear the rainbow jersey during their reign as world champion) often suffer from bad luck the next year.

=== The van Gerwen curse ===
In 2020 and 2021, a phenomenon known as the "van Gerwen curse" was discussed in darts. In PDC Major events, anyone who knocked out top player Michael van Gerwen would subsequently lose in the next round. Players who fell to the curse in this way included Simon Whitlock (three times), Dave Chisnall, Jonny Clayton, Ian White and Glen Durrant. The curse was finally broken by Clayton, who beat van Gerwen in the 2021 Masters and went on to win the tournament.

=== Ma Long WTT Singles Trophy Curse ===
Since he won the inaugural World Table Tennis (WTT) showpiece competition in Macao, China in 2020, Chinese Table Tennis player Ma Long has been unable to win an official WTT Singles title despite reaching six finals in WTT competitions as of November 2024 and winning 28 ITTF World Tour competitions before 2020. This WTT title drought has been dubbed a curse by many fans and commentators in the table tennis world.

=== 35 years old and over UFC Male title curse (Lightweight division and below) ===
In the Ultimate Fighting Championship (UFC), the 35 and over title curse refers to a longstanding trend in which male fighters aged 35 and older had consistently failed to capture or defend championship titles in the lighter weight classes—specifically, lightweight (155 lbs), featherweight (145 lbs), bantamweight (135 lbs), and flyweight (125 lbs). This phenomenon had persisted since the UFC introduced these lower weight divisions and had become an oft-cited superstition within the MMA community. The curse was notable for its statistical consistency. While fighters aged 35 and above have found success in higher weight divisions—such as middleweight, light heavyweight and heavyweight—no male fighter in UFC history has won a championship bout in the lightweight division or lower after reaching the age of 35. Alexander Volkanovski created history, as he won the vacant UFC featherweight championship (145 lbs) beating Diego Lopes at UFC 314 at the age of 36, thus effectively ending the curse.

== Multiple sports ==
=== 2012 Olympics ===
Reports of an "Olympic curse" (malediction olympique) were noted in French media in 2015 following the murder of Belarusian sprinter Yuliya Balykina and the deaths of French athletes Alexis Vastine and Camille Muffat in a helicopter crash during the reality show Dropped. By April 2016, eighteen of the 10,568 competitors had died, but, based on mortality data for people of the competitors' average age of 26, this was actually lower than the expected death rate, which would have been seven competitors per year and a total by April 2016 of 28.

=== 40-year Olympic curse ===
In 2020, due to the COVID-19 pandemic, discussions were being held regarding the fate of the 2020 Summer Olympics in Tokyo. In March 2020, Japan's finance minister called the event the "cursed Olympics", noting the cancellation of the 1940 Summer Olympics due to World War II and the 66-country boycott of the 1980 Summer Olympics. The 2020 Olympics were delayed to 2021, with the possibility of cancellation if that deadline could not be met. The Olympics went on in 2021 as planned, although the events were held without audience or with a reduced audience.

=== Atlanta, Georgia ===
Prior to the 2021 World Series, Atlanta, Georgia had won only one "Big Four" league professional sports championship: the 1995 World Series.

The National Football League (NFL)'s Atlanta Falcons won their first division championship in 1980 and were favored against the Dallas Cowboys in the Divisional playoff game. Despite trailing 24–10 at the beginning of the fourth quarter, the Cowboys rallied to out-score the Falcons 20–3 in the quarter to defeat the Falcons 30–27. In 1998, the Falcons advanced to play in the club's first-ever Super Bowl game after upsetting the heavily favored Minnesota Vikings in the NFC Championship Game 30–27; however, the Falcons lost to John Elway (in his final game) and the Denver Broncos 34–19 in Super Bowl XXXIII. In 2010 and 2012 the Falcons held the number 1 seed in the NFC playoffs, but were upset by the Green Bay Packers and San Francisco 49ers, respectively. The latter occurred in the NFC Championship Game, where the Falcons held a 17–0 lead. In Super Bowl LI, the Falcons' second-ever Super Bowl appearance, Atlanta jumped out to a 28–3 lead over Tom Brady and the New England Patriots. However, the Falcons suffered by far the greatest collapse in Super Bowl history (25 points; the previous record was 10) and lost to the Patriots 34–28 in the first Super Bowl game to ever be decided in an overtime period. In the 2020 season the Falcons blew back to back 15+ point leads as well as scoring an accidental touchdown with a minute left on the clock that gave Matthew Stafford and the Detroit Lions an opportunity to drive the field and score a go-back-ahead touchdown.

Consistently fielding one of the best teams in Major League Baseball, the Atlanta Braves won 14 straight division titles from 1991 to 2005 but won the World Series only twice (1995 and 2021) In the 1996 World Series, the Braves seemed poised to win their second straight championship after jumping out to a 2–0 series lead going home. However, the Braves lost four straight games to the New York Yankees, including a Game 4 in which they held a 6–0 lead. In 1999, the Braves were swept in four games by the New York Yankees. Notable examples of the Atlanta sports curse as it pertains to the Braves include Lonnie Smith, Ed Sprague, Charlie Leibrandt (in back-to-back World Series), Jim Leyritz, Eric Gregg's wide strike zone, Chris Burke walk-off home run, Brooks Conrad's errors, blowing an 8 1/2 game Wild Card lead in September 2011, the 2012 National League Wild Card Game, the 2019 National League Division Series, and blowing a 3–1 series lead in the 2020 NLCS.

The National Basketball Association (NBA)'s Atlanta Hawks have not played in an NBA Finals since the club's move from St. Louis, Missouri in 1968. Their first appearance in the Eastern Conference Finals was against the Cleveland Cavaliers in 2015, in which they were swept four games to zero despite being a 60-win team and the 1-seed in the conference. The Hawks returned to the Eastern Conference Finals in 2021, only to have their star player, Trae Young, injured in the Eastern Conference Finals, which they lost to the Milwaukee Bucks.

Atlanta has lost two National Hockey League (NHL) franchises to Canadian cities: the Atlanta Flames (who moved to Calgary in 1980) and the Atlanta Thrashers (who moved to Winnipeg in 2011). In both cases, the Atlanta team failed to so much as win a playoff round (the Thrashers never won a playoff game).

The 2017 Georgia Bulldogs college football team blew a 13-point lead at halftime in the 2018 College Football Playoff National Championship to Alabama and lost in overtime, 26–23, despite Alabama benching their starting quarterback, Jalen Hurts, at halftime in favor of Tua Tagovailoa. Later that year, in the 2018 SEC Championship Game, Georgia once again blew a 14-point lead to Alabama in the same venue as their National Championship loss and once again also losing to the backup quarterback (this time Hurts, who replaced an injured Tagovailoa).

Atlanta's Women's National Basketball Association (WNBA) team, the Atlanta Dream, have reached the WNBA Finals on three occasions (2010, 2011, and 2013) but were swept three games to zero each time. In 2026, the Dream won three WNBA Finals games only to lose in the first ever Game 7 in league history to Golden State.

Off the field, the curse has found its way towards athletes as well. Eugene Robinson, who played for the Falcons during the 1998 season, was arrested for soliciting a prostitute the night before Super Bowl XXXIII. Michael Vick's arrest for involvement in an illegal dog fighting ring came while he was still with the Falcons. Thabo Sefolosha, the Hawks' star defender in 2015, was arrested in New York City weeks before the beginning of the NBA playoffs and suffered a fractured tibia while being detained. In April 2021, the Braves were stripped of the 2021 MLB All-Star Game due to a recently passed bill in Georgia that resulted in alleged voter suppression.

However, Major League Soccer (MLS)'s Atlanta United FC won the MLS Cup in just their second season, in 2018. Though MLS is not considered to be one of the "Big Four" major sports leagues in North America, some believe the curse was broken with this victory.

In 2021, the Atlanta Braves, despite numerous injuries, inconsistent first-half performances, Marcell Ozuna's off-the-field incident, and having the worst record of any 2021 playoff team, won the 2021 World Series. In January 2022, the Georgia Bulldogs finally ended their 41-year title drought with a 33-18 comeback win over hated rival Alabama, before winning a second consecutive title the following season against the TCU Horned Frogs by a score of 65-7, one of the biggest blowouts in bowl game history.

=== Buffalo, New York ===
The two major professional sports teams in Buffalo, the Buffalo Bills (along with their 1920s and 1940s predecessors) and Buffalo Sabres, have never won a championship in the National Football League or National Hockey League, respectively, with the Bills' only league title being its 1964 and 1965 American Football League championships. Both teams held, at various times in the 21st century, their respective league's longest playoff drought.

=== Busan ===
Busan is a major port city in the southeastern part of South Korea and well known for its passionate local support for its professional sports teams. While the term "sports curse" is not commonly used in Korean, the failures of its local teams during the 2000s have been well-documented and long-suffering fans often been humorously highlighted by the media. KBO League team Lotte Giants have not won a Korean Series title since the 1990s while K League original member Busan IPark went through ownership changes and was relegated to the second division in 2015, ending over three decades in the top division. The last time a Busan team had won a title was in 1997, when Kia won the inaugural KBL Championship and Daewoo Royals won the K League title. Professional basketball teams Busan KCC Egis (KBL) and Busan BNK Sum (WKBL) ended the drought in 2024 and 2025 respectively by winning their respective championships, the latter becoming the first ever Busan-based franchise to win it at home. Such was the significance of Busan KCC Egis's win that it gained extensive national media coverage and the Championship-winning team was personally honored by the Mayor.

=== Cleveland, Ohio ===
Prior to 2016, Cleveland was particularly known for not winning a championship in any major sport since 1964, as well as repeatedly losing playoff games in heartbreaking fashion. Although the Cleveland Browns won the 1964 NFL Championship Game, the match occurred two seasons prior to the first Super Bowl and six before the AFL–NFL merger. More than fifty years after winning their last league title, the Browns remain one of only four teams yet to play in the NFL title game during the modern era. More recently, the Cleveland Indians lost the 1995, 1997, and 2016 World Series, and the Cleveland Cavaliers were swept in both the 2007 and 2018 NBA Finals. In 2004, ESPN.com ranked Cleveland "the most tortured sports city in America". In 2012, Cleveland Scene dubbed the city's sports struggles "The Curse of Chief Wahoo", a reference to continued use of the controversial logo. (Chief Wahoo was eventually retired in 2018, with the Indians renaming themselves the Cleveland Guardians in 2022.)

The Cleveland curse was "broken" when the Cavaliers defeated the Golden State Warriors in Game 7 of the 2016 NBA Finals, thereby ending Cleveland's 52-year championship drought.

=== Drake curse ===
The Drake curse is a sports curse attributed to rapper Drake. Endorsement from Drake, including wearing a team's or player's jersey, publicly declaring support for a team or attending a game has resulted in a loss or negative outcome for players and teams. Teams and athletes supposedly affected by the curse include Alabama football, Conor McGregor, the Toronto Raptors and Toronto Blue Jays, Kentucky basketball, Juventus FC, the Canada men's national soccer team, Serena Williams and Anthony Joshua. In 2019, after the Toronto Raptors defeated the Philadelphia 76ers with a buzzer-beater from Kawhi Leonard, it was revealed Drake was wearing 76ers shorts in order to use the curse to his advantage.

The Drake curse was briefly lifted on June 13, 2019, when the Toronto Raptors defeated the Golden State Warriors in game six of the 2019 NBA Finals to win the series 4-2 and claim their first NBA championship and the country's first championship since the 1993 World Series when the Toronto Blue Jays defeated the Philadelphia Phillies in the 4–2 series.

The Dallas Cowboys became the latest team to suffer the Drake Curse as of 2024 when they lost to Green Bay Packers in the 2023–24 NFL playoffs, however, the curse was considered to have been lifted after being broken over the course of 2023 and 2024 when the Kansas City Chiefs won the AFC championship against the Cincinnati Bengals in the AFC Championship and the Philadelphia Eagles in Super Bowl LVII after he bet on the Chiefs to win both games and again a year later when the Chiefs beat the San Francisco 49ers in Super Bowl LVIII.

A data study of his full betting record between 2022 and 2024 concluded that the curse was somewhat of a myth. However, it concluded that 6 athletes and teams could claim to have been 'officially Drake cursed' after being defeated despite being favorites by oddsmakers. UFC fighters Aljamain Sterling, Israel Adesanya and Sean Strickland, along with boxer Tyson Fury, NFL wide receiver Odell Beckham Jr, and the Duke Blue Devils men's basketball team, are those named as ‘most cursed’.

=== Gillette ===
Marketing experts have highlighted the "curse of Gillette", given the mishaps that happen to sports stars which are associated with the brand, most notably Tiger Woods, Thierry Henry and David Beckham. One notable exception to the curse is the New England Patriots, who have played at Gillette Stadium since 2002 and have won six Super Bowls in that time frame.

=== Gold Coast, Queensland ===
The Gold Coast is notorious for having teams perform poorly in the major Australian sports leagues and either fold, rebrand or relocate shortly after. Most of the city's sports teams have never reached the Grand Final of any major sports league in Australia, let alone win a premiership/championship. The Gold Coast is often referred to as "the graveyard" due to the number of professional sports teams that have folded in the city. The teams will often fall into trouble over poor on field performances, financial problems, ownership issues and/or under performing shortly after signing a marquee player. One of the city's two current professional teams fell dangerously close to suffering the same fate in 2015 as Australian media outlets reported they were trying desperately to avoid the curse.

=== Kenny Albert–Chicago curse ===
Sportscaster Kenny Albert is known to some Chicago sports fans as "The Kiss of Death" to their teams. Many games involving the Bears and Blackhawks with Albert announcing have ended in losses for both teams. Examples include Game 7 of the 2014 Western Conference Final between the Blackhawks and Kings, and many Chicago Bears' games with Albert announcing since 2004.

=== Minneapolis–Saint Paul, Minnesota ===
Since the Minnesota Twins won the 1991 World Series, the four main sports teams based in the Minneapolis–Saint Paul metropolitan area (Minnesota Vikings, Minnesota Timberwolves, Minnesota Wild, Minnesota Twins, and formerly the Minnesota North Stars) have been unable to win or appear in a championship, whether it's a Super Bowl, Stanley Cup, NBA Finals, or World Series.

The Minnesota Vikings have appeared in four Super Bowls but have yet to win any. They also played in six NFC Championship games since 1976, the year they lost Super Bowl XI to the Oakland Raiders and the last time they made the Super Bowl. However, they have been unable to win any. The closest the Vikings came to winning the NFC Championship game since that span is the 1998 NFC Championship game and 2009 NFC Championship game. In 2003, the Vikings missed the playoffs despite having a 6–0 start with Nate Poole catching a game-winning touchdown pass from quarterback Josh McCown to miss the playoffs. In 2016, the Vikings had a 5–0 start but were eliminated from the playoffs following a 38–25 loss to the Green Bay Packers. In 2017, the Vikings advanced to the NFC Championship following a game-winning play from wide receiver Stefon Diggs, but were blown out 38–7 by the Philadelphia Eagles.

Since the Minnesota Timberwolves was established in 1989, they have yet to play in any NBA Finals or win it, with the closest being Western Conference Finals appearances in the 2003–04 season, the 2023–24 season, and the 2024–25 season; after the 2003-04 season, they would fail to make the playoffs until the 2017–18 season. They would make the playoffs again during the 2021–22 season, but would lose in six games to the Memphis Grizzlies, including a blown 26-point lead in game 3 and a 10-point lead in game 6. They advanced to the 2024 and 2025 Western Conference Finals only to lose each in 5 games to the Dallas Mavericks and Oklahoma City Thunder respectively.

Despite the struggles of the area's other teams, the Minnesota Lynx have won four WNBA Championships during the 2010s, and the Minnesota Frost won two PWHL Championships in 2024 and 2025 in that league's first two seasons.

=== Philadelphia, Pennsylvania ===
The "Curse of Billy Penn" was cited as a reason for Philadelphia sports teams' failure to win championships since the Philadelphia 76ers swept the Los Angeles Lakers in the 1983 NBA Finals. Some fans believe that the city's breaking of a gentlemen's agreement in 1987, that no building in Philadelphia be built higher than the statue of William Penn on the top of the spire of City Hall, put a curse on the city.

When the final beam in the construction of the Comcast Center, was raised on June 18, 2007, iron workers of Local Union 401 attached a small figurine of William Penn to the beam in an attempt to break the curse. The following year, the Philadelphia Phillies won the 2008 World Series. Ten years later, when the even taller Comcast Technology Center was topped out, the iron workers on that skyscraper did the same thing and the Philadelphia Eagles would go on to win Super Bowl LII.

The city's sports teams have also lost in championship finals in years of presidential inaugurations, beginning with the 76ers' loss in the 1977 NBA Finals and includes the Phillies' loss in the 2009 World Series. During that span, each of the four city's teams have lost championships during such years twice. This ended in 2025 with the Eagles winning Super Bowl LIX.

=== Rocky statue curse ===
The Rocky statue is a 2-ton, 10-foot (3.0 m)-tall bronze statue of fictional boxer Rocky Balboa, currently located at the top of the Rocky Steps at the Philadelphia Museum of Art in Philadelphia. The statue was originally cast as a prop for the film Rocky III, and has also previously been installed at the Philadelphia Spectrum and at the bottom of the Rocky Steps.

It has been suggested that when fans of non-Philadelphia teams dress up the Rocky statue in their team's gear, their team loses. In one notable example, before the 2017–18 NFC Championship game, visiting Minnesota Vikings fans had dressed the Rocky statue in Viking colors; the Philadelphia Eagles would go on to defeat the team 38–7, denying the Vikings the opportunity to become the first team to play in a Super Bowl in its home stadium. In response to this and other examples, in the run-up to Super Bowl LVII, the Kansas City Chiefs' Travis Kelce warned "Chiefs, do not touch the fucking Rocky memorial!" The fans did not adhere to his warning and dressed the statue in a Chiefs' jersey but the Chiefs went on to win the Super Bowl, the only notable exception to the curse.

The curse gained international attention during the 2026 FIFA World Cup when Ecuadorian fans dressed the statue in the uniform of the Ecuadorian football team before their group stage match against Ivory Coast on 14 June 2026; Ecuador would go on to lose the match, leading Visit Pennsylvania to warn international soccer fans about the alleged curse on social media, while some Brazilian fans went as far as roping off the statue and carrying warning placards to ward off other fans from dressing the statue before their team's clash against Haiti a few days later.

=== San Diego, California ===
San Diego is the largest American city not to have won a championship in a major professional league. Currently, there is no NFL, NBA, or NHL team in the San Diego metropolitan area. The city does have one major league title to its name: the 1963 American Football League (AFL) Championship won by the San Diego Chargers, when the AFL was an independent entity prior to the AFL–NFL merger in 1970. Due to its lackluster record on winning professional championships, and in some cases retaining professional teams, some San Diego sports fans believe there is a curse on professional sports in the city. Since 2016 when the Cleveland Cavaliers won an NBA championship, San Diego became the city with the longest championship drought in North America with at least one major league franchise.

Founded in 1969, the San Diego Padres are one of five Major League Baseball franchises that have never won the World Series. The Padres have twice advanced to the World Series, losing 4–1 to the Detroit Tigers in 1984 and being swept 4–0 by the New York Yankees in 1998. Aside from those 2 World Series appearances, the Padres have only made the playoffs seven other times. In 1996, 2005, and 2006, the Padres lost the NLDS to the St. Louis Cardinals. In 2020, the Padres beat the Cardinals in the Wild Card Series and moved on to the NLDS, where the team was swept in 3 games by the rival and eventual World Series champion Los Angeles Dodgers. In 2022, the Padres defeated the Dodgers in the NLDS to advance to their third ever NLCS and first since 1998, eventually falling to the Philadelphia Phillies four games to one. In 2024, the Padres finished with their best record since 1998, but they were defeated by the Los Angeles Dodgers in the 2024 NLDS in five games after holding a commanding 2–1 lead in the series, by virtue of 24 consecutive scoreless innings to end the series. In 2025, the Padres finished 90–72 in the regular season and qualified for the postseason for the fourth time in 6 seasons, however they lost two games to one against the Chicago Cubs in the National League Wild Card. In 2026, the Padres finished 91-71 in the regular season, and for the first time in franchise history, made the postseason 3 seasons in a row. This time, they soundly swept the Cubs two games to none in the National League Wild Card, only allowing one run across both games. They then fell to the Milwaukee Brewers, three games to one, in the 2026 NLDS in incredibly disappointing fashion. In the 9th inning of Game 1, with the Padres down 3–2, Ty France hit what looked like a surefire go-ahead home run. However, it hit the roof of American Family Field, and fell into the glove of Jackson Chourio for an out. The Padres would go on to lose the game. In Game 2, with the Brewers down to their last strike and down 3–2, Chourio would hit a walk-off, 2-run single off Mason Miller to put the Brewers ahead two games to none. In the 8th inning of Game 4, with the Padres down 3–1, Manny Machado hit what looked like a 2-run home run to tie the game. However, Garrett Mitchell would rob it at the last second, much to Machado's dismay. The Padres season would end one inning later.

Founded in 1959, the San Diego Chargers (now the Los Angeles Chargers) are one of 12 National Football League franchises that have never won the Super Bowl. In 1964, the Chargers were set to defend their 1963 AFL title against the Buffalo Bills. However, a key play by Mike Stratton on Keith Lincoln would help the Bills win, 20–7. In 1965, the Chargers played the Bills again in the championship game and were shut out 23–0. The quarterback for the Bills (and the game MVP) in both games was former Charger Jack Kemp (and incidentally, those two championships would also be Buffalo's last). In 1966, team owner and founder Barron Hilton was forced to sell the team to appease the board of directors of Hilton Hotels. Since Hilton sold the team, the Chargers have only had one Super Bowl appearance, in 1994, where they lost 49–26 to the San Francisco 49ers in Super Bowl XXIX, as San Francisco quarterback and eventual MVP Steve Young threw for a Super Bowl–record six touchdowns. Additionally, eight members of that 1994 Chargers team, including team captain Junior Seau, died before the age of 45.

Since their appearance in Super Bowl Super Bowl XXIX, the Chargers have fielded various dominant teams with Super Bowl aspirations, only to take an early playoff exit. In 2004, the Chargers finished 12-4 and hosted the New York Jets in the Wild Card Game, losing the game in overtime 20-17, despite rallying from a 17-7 fourth quarter deficit. In overtime, kicker Nate Kaeding missed a field goal that would've won the game for them. The Jets then shortly won on their own field goal to win. In 2006, the Chargers finished a league-best and franchise best 14-2 and clinched the 1 seed in the AFC Playoffs. The Chargers hosted the New England Patriots in the Divisional Round. Late in the fourth quarter, with the Chargers leading 21–13, Patriots quarterback Tom Brady threw an interception to Marlon McCree, which likely would have clinched a victory for the Chargers. However, McCree was stripped of the ball by Patriots wide receiver Troy Brown. The Patriots were able to tie the score at 21, ultimately winning the game 24–21 on a late field goal. The play has since gone down as the greatest "what-ifs" in Chargers history. Many Chargers fans later would claim that the 2006 Chargers was the team's best chance to deliver a Super Bowl to the city, given the quality of the team and the remaining teams they would've had to play (the Colts, the same team the Chargers eliminated in the next 2 postseason, and the Bears, the team Indianapolis soundly defeated in Super Bowl XLI). Some would even say that had the Chargers won Super Bowl XLI, they would've never left San Diego years later.

In 2007, the Chargers finished 11-5 and won the AFC West, advancing to the AFC Championship Game. The Chargers fell to the 17-0 New England Patriots by a score of 21–12. Since their Super Bowl appearance in 1994, this remains the only time the Chargers have reached the AFC Championship Game. In 2008, the Chargers became the first team in NFL history to start a season 4-8 and make the playoffs by winning their final four games, including a 52–21 victory in a win-and-in game over the Denver Broncos. After upsetting the Indianapolis Colts in the Wild Card Game, the Chargers lost to the Pittsburgh Steelers in the next round 35–24. In 2009, finished the season at 13–3 as the AFC's two seed. However, in the divisional round against the New York Jets, the Chargers lost 17-14, which included 3 missed field goals by kicker Nate Kaeding. After four consecutive AFC West crowns from 2006 to 2009, the Chargers only made the playoffs once in their final seven seasons in San Diego; in 2013 when the team finished as the AFC's six seed. The Chargers beat the Cincinnati Bengals in the Wild Card Round 27–10, but lost to the Denver Broncos in the next round 24–17. The Chargers eventually left San Diego in 2017.

=== Sports Illustrated cover ===
Players who appear on the cover of the Sports Illustrated magazine have tended to coincidentally suffer setbacks, injuries and even deaths, or lose important games, shortly after appearing on the cover.

=== The Trump Curse ===
A curse surrounding Donald Trump has flooded social media, especially after the US men's national team's loss to Belgium in the Round of 16. This curse is largely attributed to his interactions with sporting events. For Super Bowl LIX, where he chose the Kansas City Chiefs to win but instead they lost. He attended a regular season game featuring the Detroit Lions at the Washington Commanders, where the Commanders lost 44-22. He attended Game 5 of the 2019 World Series. The Washington Nationals lost that game, but at least, they went on to win the World Series in 7 games, their first championship in franchise history. He attended Game 3 of the 2026 NBA Finals. The Knicks were on a 13 game playoff game winning streak. They proceeded to lose that game 3, but at least, they went on to win their first championship in 53 years.

Trump attended the 2025 Ryder Cup and the US lost to Europe
