= Sports Illustrated cover jinx =

Athletes slumping after media recognition

The Sports Illustrated cover jinx is an urban legend that states that individuals or teams who appear on the cover of the Sports Illustrated magazine will subsequently be jinxed.

== Explanations ==
A common explanation for the perceived effect is that athletes are generally featured on the cover after an exceptionally good performance, which might be an outlier compared to their usual level of performance. Therefore, their future performance is likely to display regression toward the mean and be less impressive by comparison. This decline in performance would then be misperceived as being related to, or even possibly caused by, the appearance on the magazine cover.

Most athletes that seemed to suffer the jinx most typically suffered because of an injury or some other bad luck following their appearance. One prime candidate for this explanation is Eddie Mathews who suffered a broken hand while the team's nine game winning streak came to a close following the cover. In this case, the odds are that a player will suffer an injury while playing any given sport. Injuries are a given in a physical contact sport such as American football or baseball, which is what Mathews played. Even injuries in individual sports such as skiing can fall under this explanation as it is common to make a bad move in this sport and get caught up in a massive mistake of the athlete's own doing which results in injury. Finally, winning and losing streaks come to a close in all sports and this includes Milwaukee's nine-game winning streak in 1954. This makes the 1972 Miami Dolphins perfect season, 2007 New England Patriots perfect regular season, and the 2008 Detroit Lions, and 2017 Cleveland Browns winless seasons all the more remarkable.

SI addressed its own opinions on the alleged cover jinx in a 2002 issue that featured a black cat on its cover.

== Notable contradictions to curse ==
While the list of examples of the so-called jinx may be extensive, some records contradict the existence of a curse.

- Vince Young discredited the Sports Illustrated jinx by appearing on the cover of Sports Illustrated twice during Texas' National Championship season.
- Emmitt Smith appeared on the cover the same week the Dallas Cowboys won Super Bowl XXVIII. In the America's Game documentary, Smith recalled that he adamantly wanted off the cover for fear of the jinx. Regardless, the Cowboys went on to win their second consecutive title of the 1990s, and fourth in team history.
- The Houston Astros, who were featured in a 2014 SI cover predicting them to be the 2017 World Series Champions, did in fact win the World Series in 2017, beating the Los Angeles Dodgers 4 games to 3 for their first ever title. However, this contradiction may be questioned after it was discovered that the team used a unique series of signals to steal signs.
- A cover of a 2016 SI Kids issue showed the Chicago Cubs en route to their victory in the 2016 World Series, where they defeated the Cleveland Guardians and broke their century long losing streak.

== Notable incidents ==
=== Pre-2000 ===
- January 30, 1955: American alpine skier Jill Kinmont was competing in a giant slalom event in Alta, Utah, when she lost control and crashed into a tree. She suffered a spinal cord injury and lived with quadriplegia for the rest of her life. Kinmont had been featured on the cover of the January 31 issue, which was on newsstands prior to the race.
- May 26, 1958: Racing driver Pat O'Connor appeared on the cover of the Indianapolis 500 preview issue. He would die in a fiery crash four days later, on the opening lap of the race.
- February 15, 1960: After gracing the cover of the Winter Olympics preview issue, Soviet speed skater Gennady Voronin was hampered by injury and finished out of the medals at Squaw Valley. Troubles mounted after he also missed the 1964 games due to injury, as Voronin began to abuse alcohol. Unable to deal with the success of his wife, fellow speed skater and four-time world champion Inga Artamonova, Voronin was convicted of stabbing her to death in 1966 and was sentenced to 10 years in prison.
- March 28, 1960: For a story on wet fly fishing, the cover featured an array of ten images. They included a photo of the fly-tying pioneer James E. Leisenring (1878–1951) and sketches by artist Anthony Ravielli depicting world flycasting champion Johnny Dieckman (at upper right on the cover) and Vernon S. "Pete" Hidy (on the bottom row of the cover). Less than two years later, the 35-year-old Dieckman was one of 87 passengers who perished in the crash of American Airlines Flight 1.
- October 31, 1960: Formula One world champion Jack Brabham appears on the cover. For the following season, Brabham found himself outclassed by a newer generation of cars, as well retiring from a number of races.
- February 15, 1961: U.S. figure skating champion Laurence Owen and the rest of the 1961 U.S. figure skating team were killed in a plane crash in Belgium, en route to the 1961 World Championships in Prague, Czechoslovakia. Owen was on the cover of the February 13 issue.
- May 29, 1961: Johnny Boyd appears uncredited driving in preparation for the Indianapolis 500, he retired during the race with clutch problems.
- March 18, 1963: On the Final Four preview cover, Cincinnati Bearcats guard Larry Shingleton was shown cutting down the nets following his team's second straight NCAA championship in 1962. In the 1963 championship game on March 23, Shingleton missed a free throw with 12 seconds left that would have given Cincinnati a three-point lead and all but clinched another title. Instead, Loyola (Chicago) tied the game in regulation and won it in overtime.
- July 8, 1963: World champion fisherman Jon Tarantino, featured in a cover story on fly casting, was shot to death 10 years later, on June 11, 1973, in a robbery at his family's San Francisco fish and poultry market.
- November 23, 1964: A year to the day after the assassination of President John F. Kennedy, the cover featured a rendering of his personal ski instructor, Helmut Falch of Austria. An accident would later leave Falch paralyzed, though he went on to win four Paralympic gold medals in alpine skiing.
- March 15, 1965: Golfer Tony Lema, previously featured on the March 23, 1964, cover, appeared this week in an artist's rendition. In July 1966, the 32-year-old Lema and his wife Betty, 30, were killed along with the two co-pilots when the private plane they chartered to travel between tournaments crashed in Lansing, Illinois.
- March 22, 1965: Boxer Willie Pastrano, the world light heavyweight champion at age 29, appears with the caption, "Ready to defend his title." On March 30, he lost the WBA and WBC crowns to José Torres on a 9th-round technical knock-out. It would be the final bout of Pastrano's career.
- March 29, 1965: UCLA's Gail Goodrich was shown shooting against Michigan center Bill Buntin during the Bruins' NCAA basketball championship win. Buntin died suddenly three years later of a heart attack while playing a pick-up basketball game at age 26.
- May 1, 1967: Chaparral's Jim Hall, who appeared along with his Chaparral 2F on the cover, would go on to suffer from a number of mishaps for the rest of the decade. At the end of the season, that car found itself ineligible for competition through controversial rule changes. For the following year, Hall collided with another car at the Stardust Grand Prix, ending his driving career effectively. In 1969, his Chaparral 2H suffered from a poor season and in 1970, the innovative 2J fan-car, despite its performance, proved to be unreliable and following protests from competitors, was banned from competition at the end of the season. Hall and his team had to wait until the end of the decade for any success, most notably the 1980 Indianapolis 500, where the Chaparral would win the race with Johnny Rutherford driving.
- June 19, 1967: The boxing success of welterweight Gypsy Joe Harris, who lost sight in his right eye at age 11, earned him cover recognition despite the handicap which, at the time, had not yet been publicized nor discovered by boxing regulators. However, on October 11, 1968 (about two months after his first career loss in 25 career bouts) a routine doctor's examination of inflammation in the eye revealed his visual impairment. Stripped of his boxing license and unable to hold gainful employment thereafter, Harris fell into a life of drug and alcohol abuse before dying in 1990 at age 44.
- July 31, 1967: An unnamed left-handed pitcher (or model) appeared on the cover for a story on the then-prevalent use of the illegal spitball pitch. The article prominently mentions Jack Hamilton of the California Angels, with Washington Senators manager Gil Hodges opining that Hamilton throws "the most flagrant spitter I ever saw ... It was the worst exhibition I've seen in baseball ... He made a farce of the game. Everyone knows that 90% of the pitchers in our league have thrown a spitter at one time or another, but none continues to break the rule like Hamilton." On August 18, 1967, an errant Hamilton pitch shattered the face and left eye socket of Boston Red Sox outfielder Tony Conigliaro, who was in the midst of a stellar season. Conigliaro (who would appear with his grotesquely blackened eye on the June 22, 1970, cover), was knocked out of action for the 1967 World Series, missed all of 1968, and continued to struggle with vision problems before retiring at age 30. The incident also scarred Hamilton, who would never again pitch inside so aggressively against hitters and lost effectiveness before leaving the sport less than two years later. Hamilton has steadfastly denied that the pitch to Conigliaro was a spitball despite contradictory statements from his own teammates.
- May 13, 1968: Graham Hill appeared driving the turbine powered and four-wheel drive Lotus 56 in preparation for the Indianapolis 500. He crashed out during the race; his teammates retired the race with fuel shaft failure. Turbine power and four-wheel drive was banned at the end of the season.
- June 7, 1971: Al Unser and Peter Revson appeared on the cover celebrating their 1st and 2nd finish in the 1971 Indianapolis 500. Shortly after this publication, Unser began his string of retirements for the rest of that season.
- June 5, 1978: Al Unser appeared on the cover celebrating his third Indianapolis 500 win; in the next two rounds, he did not finish at Mosport (crash) and West Allis (out of fuel). However this jinx was short lived as he scored a win at the Pocono 500 and later claimed the Triple Crown by winning on the USAC Championship Trial the California 500, winning the series' three major 500 mile races.
- May 25, 1981: A. J. Foyt appeared on the cover with the headline "Foyt Goes for a Fifth 500". Despite starting third, he ended up finishing 13th.
- June 3, 1985: Danny Sullivan earned his cover appearance following his remarkable "Spin and Win" victory at the Indy 500. A day prior to this appearance, he had already begun a string of retirements for another two months.
- July 21, 1986: Jim Kelly was shown in a New Jersey Generals uniform in a preview of the 1986 United States Football League season. The USFL lost its pivotal antitrust lawsuit eight days later, and Kelly would never play for the Generals, joining the NFL's Buffalo Bills in time for the 1986 preseason.
- April 6, 1987: The preview issue of the 1987 Major League Baseball season featured Cleveland Indians players Joe Carter and Cory Snyder with the headline "Indian Uprising", predicting the Indians to finish with the American League's best record. However, Cleveland ended the season with baseball's worst record, going 61–101.
- April 24, 1989: In the preview issue for the 1989 NFL draft, football player Tony Mandarich was featured on the cover, with the label of "best offensive line prospect ever." Mandarich has been widely regarded as a bust in the NFL. In fact, he would appear on the cover again three years later under the headline "Incredible Bust".
- May 8, 1989: Jon Peters of Brenham High School in Texas set the national high school record for games won by a pitcher, with a 51–0 record. The next game after the cover, he lost for the first (and only) time in his high school career.
- June 5, 1989: After the Los Angeles Lakers swept the Phoenix Suns in the NBA Western Conference Finals to go undefeated to that point in the playoffs, that week's cover featured Lakers forward James Worthy with the word "SWEEP!" in large letters and, in smaller letters, the caption: "James Worthy and the Lakers beat the Suns to go 11–0 in the playoffs." The Lakers would go on to lose in the 1989 NBA Finals, being swept 4–0 by the Detroit Pistons after losing starting guards Magic Johnson and Byron Scott to hamstring injuries.

=== 2000 and later ===
- September 4, 2000: Ryan Leaf appeared on the cover with the headline "Back from the Brink" after a 24–20 win by his San Diego Chargers over the Arizona Cardinals characterizing his comeback as "an ascent from pariah to possible standout pro passer". This did not improve his team's performance during the season through Leaf's injuries and poor attitude, leading to his release, and ultimately, his career never recovered.
- December 6, 2000: Race car driver Dale Earnhardt appeared on the cover with his son Dale Jr.. He died two months later on the final lap of the Daytona 500.
- September 2003: The Oregon Ducks were placed on the cover after starting 4–0 and upsetting Michigan. They lost their next three games. They did not recover from the losing streak, as they finished 8–5 and lost to Minnesota in the Sun Bowl 31–30, with Minnesota kicking a game winning field goal with 23 seconds left.
- August 25, 2008: Michael Phelps appeared on the cover following his Olympic triumphs and reappeared in December 8 issue as Sportsman of the Year. In February 2009, publication of a photograph of Phelps using a water pipe, a device used for smoking tobacco or marijuana, surfaced on a British newspaper resulting in the loss of Kellogg's as a sponsor, as well as a three-month suspension imposed by USA Swimming.
- In January 2010, Vikings quarterback Brett Favre was on the cover with the headline "Favre on Fire" before the NFC Championship Game and lost. New York Jets QB Mark Sanchez was on the cover in the Northeast and lost the AFC Championship Game.
- October 11, 2010: David Price was shown on the cover of the magazine's Major League Baseball playoff issue, the Tampa Bay Rays pitcher had a poor outing in the first game of the 2010 American League Division Series, allowing 4 earned runs on nine hits, including two home runs, in a 5–1 loss to the Texas Rangers. Price went on to pitch in Game 5 of the series and lose by the same score of 5–1 to end the Rays' playoff run.
- March 24, 2011: BYU Cougars guard Jimmer Fredette appeared on the cover after the Cougars beat Gonzaga to take them to their first NCAA tournament Sweet 16 since 1981. In the next game, Fredette only hit 11 of 29 shots in a loss to Florida.
- August 21, 2011 – Nebraska defensive lineman Jared Crick was featured front and center on the college preview cover. He did not finish his senior year because of a torn pectoral muscle.
- March 26, 2012: Albert Pujols was featured on the Sports Illustrated baseball preview cover. Next to the cover photo was the caption, "The game's greatest slugger starts over with the Angels". Pujols did not hit a home run with the Angels until May 6, 2012, his 28th game and 111th at-bat of the season. Prior to 2012, Pujols had hit 445 career home runs, 32+ home runs in each of his 11 MLB seasons (including 37 in 2011), and 3 home runs off 3 different Texas Rangers pitchers in Game 3 of the 2011 World Series, tying Babe Ruth and Reggie Jackson for the most home runs in a World Series game.
- April 16, 2012: New York Rangers goalie Henrik Lundqvist was pictured on the Sports Illustrated NHL playoff preview cover. The top-seeded Rangers lost to the sixth-seeded New Jersey Devils in six games in the Eastern Conference finals. The Devils ended up losing to the eighth-seeded Los Angeles Kings in the 2012 Stanley Cup Final.
- May 23, 2012: The Los Angeles Dodgers (specifically Matt Kemp and Magic Johnson) appeared on the cover. They held the best record in baseball (30–13) at the time and looked poised to sweep the 19–25 Arizona Diamondbacks who had been struck by injuries. They went on to lose to the Diamondbacks the same night in an 11–4 blowout. Ted Lilly received his first loss of the season. Clayton Kershaw lost to the Astros the following night. The Dodgers were then swept by the Milwaukee Brewers and then lost a series with the Rockies. They lost 8 of the next 11 games. Matt Kemp's seemingly minor injury became much more serious hamstring injury and the team was without his services for over two months. Furthermore, this was a start of an injury plagued portion of Kemp's career as he finished 2012 by playing through a shoulder injury. In 2013, Kemp got his 1,000th hit, but he also appeared in only 73 games as he battled ankle and hamstring injuries. Finally, Kemp struggled through the 2014 season to the point that he got switched to left field and was traded to San Diego in the offseason. As a team, the Dodgers failed to make the 2012 playoffs as they finished second in the NL West.
- June 11, 2012: Texas Rangers outfielder Josh Hamilton was featured on the Sports Illustrated cover. On June 15, Hamilton was hospitalized because of an intestinal virus.
- October 23, 2012: NBA superstars Steve Nash and Dwight Howard appeared on the cover of Sports Illustrated. Both players had been traded to the Los Angeles Lakers in the offseason and were expected to form a superteam alongside Kobe Bryant. Instead, Nash missed significant time that season with a broken leg and Dwight's production dropped substantially as he struggled to adapt to coach Mike D'Antoni's pick and roll-centric offensive scheme. The Lakers made the playoffs that season as a 7th seed and with Nash injured, Dwight chafing in his new role, and Kobe sidelined with a torn Achilles tendon from guiding the team to the playoffs near single-handedly, were swept in the first round by the San Antonio Spurs. Dwight would leave in free agency that offseason for the Houston Rockets where he would continue to struggle, while Nash would retire in 2015 after two more seasons almost entirely spent dealing with injuries. Both years, the Lakers missed the playoffs.
- November 20, 2013: Alabama QB A. J. McCarron was featured on the cover for his pursuit of quarterbacking a third straight national championship team. Ten days later, Alabama lost to Auburn at the end of regulation to stop their undefeated record and any chance of a national title.
- June 2, 2014: The New York Rangers had gone up 3 games to 1 against the Montreal Canadiens in the 2014 Eastern Conference Finals. Ryan McDonagh was featured on the cover celebrating Game 4's overtime goal scored by Martin St. Louis. After they went on to win the series 4 games to 2, they faced the Los Angeles Kings in the 2014 Stanley Cup Final only to lose 4 games to 1, with many of the losses being heart-breaking and controversial.
- June 24, 2014: Luis Suárez (who has had previous behavioral problems on the pitch) had just finished a successful season with Liverpool F.C., having won the PFA Player of the Year Award and avoided any controversial incidents. Suarez' reputation was improving and many supporters saw this as the start of a new chapter for him. However, less than a month after being featured on the cover of Sports Illustrated, he bit Giorgio Chiellini on the shoulder during Uruguay's 1–0 win over Italy in the 2014 FIFA World Cup and received a four-month ban from football, one of the longest in the history of the sport.
- August 14, 2014: Ohio State Buckeyes quarterback Braxton Miller was featured on one of the five regional college football preview covers. Days later, he re-injured his surgically repaired right shoulder, resulting in him missing Ohio State's entire 2014 season.
- October 27, 2014: Kansas City Royals closer Greg Holland appeared on the cover to commemorate the Royals' return to the World Series after a 29-year absence. However, the Royals would lose the series to the San Francisco Giants in seven games thanks in large part to Madison Bumgarner's outstanding pitching.
- November 10, 2014: Kentucky forward Alex Poythress was one of 5 different players to have been given a cover shot for a college basketball season preview. On December 11, 2014, Poythress suffered a torn ACL during a team practice while on an uncontested breakaway layup, ending his season after 10 games.
- January 12, 2015: Oregon Ducks wide receiver Byron Marshall was featured on the cover, which was the day of the 2015 College Football Playoff National Championship. Additionally, Andy Staples' prediction of an Oregon victory by the score of 45–41 was also featured on the cover. Oregon, led by Heisman Trophy winner Marcus Mariota, were defeated 42–20 by the Ohio State Buckeyes.
- May 25, 2015: In an unusual twist on the curse, John Forbes Nash, Jr., subject of a biography and a film titled A Beautiful Mind, died in a car crash the week a headline titled "Chip Kelly's Beautiful Mind" appeared on the cover. The reason was for a series of questionable moves made by Kelly in the offseason. The Eagles later fired Kelly on December 29, as the team was 6–9 and was well out of the playoff race.
- August 31, 2015: Serena Williams appeared on the cover promoting her possible Grand Slam victory. However, she lost to unranked Italian Roberta Vinci 2–6, 6–4, 6–4 in the semi-finals.
- October 12, 2015: The Toronto Blue Jays appear on the cover for the first time since 2005 and are nicknamed "The New Jacks". The Blue Jays later go on to lose in the 2015 ALCS to the Kansas City Royals.
- October 19, 2015: Leonard Fournette appears on the cover with the tagline: "Thank you for the comparisons, but 5–0 LSU Tiger will do just fine." The Tigers lose three straight games from November 7–21, knocking themselves out of CFP contention.
- November 2, 2015: Daniel Murphy appeared on the cover for his outstanding October appearance for the New York Mets in the 2015 MLB playoffs leading them to the World Series. He later went on a slump in the World Series against the Kansas City Royals. In Game 4, he made two costly errors resulting in a 5–3 loss. The Mets would eventually lose to the Royals in five games. Murphy left the Mets and signed with the division rival Washington Nationals in the offseason.
- November 24, 2015: The 12–0 Iowa Hawkeyes appeared on the cover but lost to the 11–1 Michigan State Spartans in the 2015 Big Ten Football Championship Game 16–13. Michigan State ended up in the College Football Playoff. The Hawkeyes were later forced to go to the Rose Bowl, where they lost to Stanford, 45–16.
- January 5, 2016: Minnesota Vikings running back Adrian Peterson appeared on the cover promoting the Vikings' NFC North title. However, the Vikings lost to the Seattle Seahawks 10–9 thanks to kicker Blair Walsh's missed chip shot field goal.
- February 2, 2016: Carolina Panthers quarterback Cam Newton appeared on the cover promoting their appearance in Super Bowl 50. However, the 17–1 Panthers were defeated by the Denver Broncos, 24–10, thanks in large part to the Broncos' top-ranked defense holding the Panthers to their lowest point total for the 2015 season.
- March 5, 2016: Conor McGregor appeared on the February 29, 2016, issue of Sports Illustrated. He was initially scheduled to fight Rafael dos Anjos, but it was cancelled due to Anjos' broken foot. The fight was rescheduled to be against Nate Diaz on March 5. McGregor lost in a second round submission.
- Michigan State men's basketball players Denzel Valentine and Bryn Forbes along with mascot Sparty appeared on the cover of the March 2016 cover of Sports Illustrated for Kids. However, the 2-seeded Spartans were upset by 15-seeded Middle Tennessee State 90–81 in the first round of the 2016 NCAA Division I men's basketball tournament.
- March 28, 2016: Oklahoma Sooners guard Buddy Hield appeared on the cover hyping Oklahoma's appearance in the 2016 Men's Final Four. However, the Sooners were blown out by the Villanova Wildcats 95–51 as Hield was held to just nine points.
- May 30, 2016: Oklahoma City Thunder forward Kevin Durant appeared on the cover promoting the Thunder's possible upset over the defending NBA Champions Golden State Warriors in the 2016 Western Conference Finals. But the Thunder blew a 3–1 lead to the Warriors as the Warriors won the series 4–3. In the offseason, Durant left the Thunder to join the Warriors.
- September 4, 2017: Three NFL players featured on covers – Aaron Rodgers, J. J. Watt, and David Johnson – all had their seasons ended early by various injuries. Johnson dislocated his wrist in week 1, Watt suffered a tibial plateau fracture in Week 5, and Rodgers broke his collarbone in Week 6. All were placed on injured reserve, and only Rodgers returned from his injury, only to be placed back on injured reserve after the Packers were eliminated from playoff contention following a Week 15 loss to the Carolina Panthers.
- March 12, 2018: The issue had three covers promoting the 2018 NCAA men's basketball tournament with one of those covers featuring Virginia Cavaliers forward Isaiah Wilkins; however the Cavaliers would become the first no. 1 seed to lose to a no. 16 seed as they lost to the UMBC Retrievers, 74–54.
- March 27, 2019: Free-agent signee Bryce Harper, stated within the magazine to have "joined a team with real World Series hopes", appeared alongside three of his new Philadelphia Phillies teammates on the cover of SI's MLB season preview; not only did the Phillies finish with a .500 record and miss the playoffs, Harper's former team, the division rival Washington Nationals – who in four attempts had never won a postseason series during his time there – would for the first time in franchise history win the World Series after he left.
- December 10, 2024: Patrick Mahomes, the quarterback of the NFL team and two-time defending champion Kansas City Chiefs, was featured on the cover of Sports Illustrated’s December issue. Two months later in Super Bowl LIX, Mahomes had perhaps the worst game of his career in a 40–22 loss to the Philadelphia Eagles, in which he threw two interceptions, one of which was returned for a touchdown. Mahomes was also sacked six times, and lost a fumble to account for every single one of the Chiefs’ turnovers, and his completion percentage was down a full percentage point from his career mark from 66.6 to 65.6%.

== See also ==
- Sports-related curses
